= List of Evolve Wrestling events =

Listing of professional wrestling events by promotion Evolve Wrestling

Evolve Wrestling was an American professional wrestling promotion which was founded in 2010 by former Ring of Honor booker and Dragon Gate USA vice president, Gabe Sapolsky. Over the course of its history, it held 146 events.

== Evolve 1: Richards vs. Ibushi ==
Evolve 1: Richards vs. Ibushi
- Promotion: Evolve Wrestling
- Date: January 16, 2010
- City: Rahway, New Jersey
- Venue: Rahway Rec Center
- Attendance: ca. 500

The inaugural Evolve show, Evolve 1: Richards vs. Ibushi, was held in Rahway, New Jersey at the Rahway Rec Center. Lenny Leonard and Leonard F. Chikarason served as the commentators. In the main event, Davey Richards, accompanied by Kyle O'Reilly and Tony Kozina, faced against Kota Ibushi, who was accompanied by Michael Nakazawa.

No.	Results	Stipulations	Times
1	Kyle O'Reilly (with Tony Kozina) defeated Bobby Fish	Singles match	6:33
2	Chuck Taylor defeated Cheech	Official singles division qualifying match	6:28
3	Ricochet defeated Arik Cannon	Singles match	4:00
4	The Dark City Fight Club (Jon Davis and Kory Chavis) defeated Aeroform (Flip Kendrick and Louis Lyndon)	Tag team match	6:26
5	Mercedes Martinez defeated Niya	Singles match	1:11
6	Brad Allen defeated Silas Young	Singles match	10:22
7	Jimmy Jacobs defeated Ken Doane	Singles match	10:06
8	Johnny Gargano defeated Chris Dickinson	Singles match	6:05
9	Munenori Sawa defeated TJP	Singles match	9:37
10	Team Frightening (Frightmare, Hallowicked and Mike Quackenbush) defeated Akuma's Army (Brodie Lee, Gran Akuma and Icarus)	Six-man tag team match	11:34
11	Davey Richards (with Kyle O'Reilly and Tony Kozina) defeated Kota Ibushi (with Michael Nakazawa) by submission	Singles match	18:12

== Evolve 2: Hero vs. Hidaka ==
Evolve 2: Hero vs. Hidaka
- Promotion: Evolve Wrestling
- Date: March 13, 2010
- City: Rahway, New Jersey
- Venue: Rahway Rec Center
- Attendance: ca. 150

No.	Results	Stipulations	Times
1	Brad Allen defeated Chris Dickinson	Singles match	6:33
2	Gran Akuma defeated Brodie Lee	Singles match	3:46
3	Up In Smoke (Cheech and Cloudy) defeated Aeroform (Flip Kendrick and Louis Lyndon)	Tag team match	4:51
4	Ken Doane defeated Caleb Konley	Singles match	6:45
5	Kyle O'Reilly (with Tony Kozina) defeated Hallowicked	Singles match	6:29
6	Chuck Taylor defeated Ricochet	Singles match	10:53
7	Claudio Castagnoli (with Chris Hero) defeated Bobby Fish	Singles match	11:38
8	Mercedes Martinez (c) defeated Sumie Sakai	Singles match for the WSU World Championship	5:38
9	Jimmy Jacobs defeated Johnny Gargano by submission	Singles match	6:42
10	The Osirian Portal (Amasis and Ophidian) defeated CHIKARA Sekigun (Frightmare and Hallowicked), Jigsaw and Mike Quackenbush and The Colony (Fire Ant and Green Ant)	Four-way tag team elimination match	18:01
11	Ikuto Hidaka (with Brad Allen) defeated Chris Hero (with Claudio Castagnoli)	Singles match	28:24
(c) / – the champion(s) heading into the match

Elimination match

Eliminated	Team	Eliminated by	Method of elimination	Time
1	The Colony	CHIKARA Sekigun	Green Ant was pinned by Hallowicked	8:08
2	CHIKARA Sekigun	Jigsaw and Mike Quackenbush	Frightmare was pinned by Jigsaw	14:16
3	Jigsaw and Mike Quackenbush	The Osirian Portal	Jigsaw was pinned by Amasis	18:01
Winners	The Osirian Portal	—N/a		18:01

== Evolve 3: Rise Or Fall ==
Evolve 3: Rise Or Fall
- Promotion: Evolve Wrestling
- Date: May 1, 2010
- City: Rahway, New Jersey
- Venue: Rahway Rec Center
- Attendance: ca. 200

No.	Results	Stipulations	Times
1	Sami Callihan defeated Adam Cole by submission	Singles match	6:57
2	Johnny Gargano defeated Ricochet	Singles match	11:44
3	Mercedes Martinez (c) defeated Brittney Savage	Singles match for the WSU World Championship	1:44
4	Aeroform (Flip Kendrick and Louis Lyndon) defeated Team Beyond (Chase Burnett and Zane Silver) and Up In Smoke (Cheech and Cloudy)	Three-way tag team match	7:28
5	Drake Younger defeated Jon Moxley	Singles match	13:24
6	Chris Hero defeated Bobby Fish	Singles match	14:51
7	Brodie Lee defeated Chris Dickinson, Gran Akuma and Hallowicked	Four-way match	6:16
8	TJP defeated Kyle O'Reilly by submission	Singles match	10:02
9	Jimmy Jacobs defeated Brad Allen by technical submission	Singles match	12:18
10	Chuck Taylor defeated Claudio Castagnoli	Singles match	18:41
(c) / – the champion(s) heading into the match

== Evolve 4: Danielson vs. Fish ==
Evolve 4: Danielson vs. Fish
- Promotion: Evolve Wrestling
- Date: July 23, 2010
- City: Union City, New Jersey
- Venue: The ACE Arena
- Attendance: ca. 150

No.	Results	Stipulations	Times
1	Brodie Lee vs. Jon Moxley ended in a double disqualification	Singles match	5:50
2	Drake Younger defeated Chris Dickinson, Rich Swann and Ricochet	Four-way match	6:08
3	Mercedes Martinez (c) defeated Tina San Antonio	Singles match for the WSU World Championship	2:15
4	Adam Cole defeated Johnny Gargano	Singles match	8:31
5	CHIKARA Sekigun (Hallowicked and Jigsaw) defeated Aeroform (Flip Kendrick and Louis Lyndon)	Tag team match	6:41
6	Sami Callihan defeated Arik Cannon by submission	Singles match	13:53
7	Up In Smoke (Cheech and Cloudy) defeated The Osirian Portal (Amasis and Ophidian)	Tag team match	11:44
8	Chuck Taylor defeated Jimmy Jacobs	Singles match	12:04
9	Bryan Danielson defeated Bobby Fish by submission	Singles match	20:39
(c) / – the champion(s) heading into the match

== Evolve 5: Danielson vs. Sawa ==
Evolve 5: Danielson vs. Sawa
- Promotion: Evolve Wrestling
- Date: September 11, 2010
- City: Rahway, New Jersey
- Venue: Rahway Rec Center
- Attendance: ca. 400

No.	Results	Stipulations	Times
1	Mike Quackenbush defeated Chuck Taylor	Singles match	9:02
2	Up In Smoke (Cheech and Cloudy) defeated Aeroform (Flip Kendrick and Louis Lyndon)	Tag team match	7:39
3	Jimmy Jacobs defeated Adam Cole	Singles match	8:06
4	Drake Younger defeated Sami Callihan	Singles match	13:02
5	Johnny Gargano defeated Brad Allen, Frightmare, Gran Akuma, Jon Moxley and Rich Swann	Six-way match	8:57
6	Mercedes Martinez (c) defeated Amazing Kong by disqualification	Singles match for the WSU World Championship	7:21
7	Ricochet defeated Kyle O'Reilly	Singles match	15:16
8	Bryan Danielson defeated Munenori Sawa by submission	Singles match	13:53
(c) / – the champion(s) heading into the match

== Evolve 6: Aries vs. Taylor ==
Evolve 6: Aries vs. Taylor
- Promotion: Evolve Wrestling
- Date: November 20, 2010
- City: Union City, New Jersey
- Venue: The ACE Arena

No.	Results	Stipulations	Times
1	Silas Young defeated Drake Younger	Singles match	9:00
2	A. R. Fox defeated Rich Swann, Scott Reed and Tony Nese	Four-way match	6:36
3	Bobby Fish defeated Kyle O'Reilly	Singles match	14:13
4	Up In Smoke (Cheech and Cloudy) defeated The Super Smash Brothers (Player Dos and Player Uno)	Tag team match	14:00
5	Jon Moxley defeated Homicide by referee stoppage	Relaxed rules match	19:57
6	Ricochet defeated Adam Cole	Singles match	14:37
7	Johnny Gargano defeated Jimmy Jacobs	Singles match	15:31
8	Austin Aries defeated Chuck Taylor by submission	Singles match	22:17

== Evolve 7: Aries Vs. Moxley ==
Evolve 7: Aries Vs. Moxley
- Promotion: Evolve Wrestling
- Date: April 19, 2011
- City: New York City, New York
- Venue: BB King Blues Club & Grill

No.	Results	Stipulations	Times
1	Shiima Xion defeated Jimmy Jacobs	Singles match	7:17
2	Silas Young defeated Tony Nese	Singles match	6:39
3	Johnny Gargano defeated Jon Davis by submission	Singles match	13:19
4	CHIKARA Sekigun (Frightmare and Jigsaw) defeated Facade and Jason Gory	Tag team match	8:36
5	Sami Callihan defeated Zack Sabre Jr. by referee stoppage	Singles match	11:49
6	A. R. Fox defeated Rich Swann	Singles match	5:56
7	Chuck Taylor defeated Akira Tozawa	Singles match	10:34
8	Johnny Gargano defeated Chuck Taylor by submission	Singles match	2:28
9	Austin Aries defeated Jon Moxley	Singles match	15:15

== Evolve 8: Style Battle ==
Evolve 8: Style Battle
- Promotion: Evolve Wrestling
- Date: May 20, 2011
- City: Union City, New Jersey
- Venue: The ACE Arena

Evolve 8: Style Battle, was held in Union City, New Jersey at The ACE Arena. The show featured the Style Battle, a one night tournament between eight wrestlers that representing different wrestling style, who was won by A. R. Fox.

=== Tournament participants ===
Wrestler	Wrestling style representing
A. R. Fox	High-Flying
Austin Aries	Hybrid
Bobby Fish	Puroresu Jr. Heavyweight
Brodie Lee	Super Heavyweight
Jon Davis	Power
Rich Swann	Rich Swann Style
Sami Callihan	Hard-Hitting
Tony Nese	Standing Combat

No.	Results	Stipulations	Times
1	A. R. Fox defeated Rich Swann	First round tournament match	5:23
2	Jon Davis defeated Tony Nese	First round tournament match	10:03
3	Sami Callihan defeated Brodie Lee by submission	First round tournament match	12:50
4	Bobby Fish defeated Austin Aries by submission	Tournament first round match	22:32
5	A. R. Fox defeated Jon Davis	Tournament semi-final match	7:17
6	Sami Callihan defeated Bobby Fish by referee stoppage	Tournament semi-final match	4:09
7	The SAT (Joel Maximo and Wil Maximo) defeated Alex Colon and Ricky Reyes	Tag team match	5:29
8	Pinkie Sanchez defeated Ahtu, Blain Rage, Brian XL, Cheech Hernandez, Derek Ryze, Kory Chavis and Scott Reed	Eight-way fray match	14:58
9	A. R. Fox defeated Sami Callihan	Tournament final match	10:15

=== Style Battle tournament ===
Quarterfinals
A. R. Fox	Pin
Rich Swann	5:23
Tony Nese	10:03
Jon Davis	Pin
Brodie Lee	12:50
Sami Callihan	Sub
Austin Aries	22:32
Bobby Fish	Sub

Semifinals
A. R. Fox	Pin
Jon Davis	7:17
Sami Callihan	Ref
Bobby Fish	4:09

Final
A. R. Fox	Pin
Sami Callihan	10:15

=== Eight-way fray match ===
Eliminated	Wrestler	Eliminated by	Method of elimination	Time
1	Brian XL	Kory Chavis	Pinned after an Inside Out Suplex	5:48
2	Blain Rage	Kory Chavis	Pinned after a Pendulum Slam	6:30
3	Cheech Hernandez	Scott Reed	Pinned after the Rolling cutter	7:14
4	Scott Reed	Kory Chavis	Pinned after a Big boot	9:03
5	Derek Ryze	Kory Chavis	Pinned after a Swinging reverse STO	10:20
6	Kory Chavis	Ahtu	Pinned after a Spear	10:54
7	Ahtu	Pinkie Sanchez	Pinned after a Front Guillotine DDT	14:58
Winner	Pinkie Sanchez			14:58

== Evolve 9: Gargano vs. Taylor ==
Evolve 9: Gargano Vs. Taylor
- Promotion: Evolve Wrestling
- Date: July 26, 2011
- City: New York City, New York
- Venue: BB King Blues Club & Grill

No.	Results	Stipulations	Times
1	Bobby Beverly vs. Eric Ryan ended in no-contest	Singles match	3:41
2	The Super Smash Brothers (Player Dos and Player Uno) defeated Facade and Jason Gory	Tag team match	6:15
3	Silas Young defeated Sugar Dunkerton	Singles match	8:55
4	Pinkie Sanchez defeated Lince Dorado by submission	Singles match	8:45
5	The Scene (Caleb Konley and Scott Reed) defeated Up In Smoke (Cheech and Cloudy)	Tag team match	11:43
6	Bobby Fish vs. Jon Davis ended in no-contest	Singles match	0:36
7	Jon Davis defeated Bobby Fish and Kevin Steen	Three-way unsanctioned street fight	7:22
8	John Silver defeated Tony Nese	Singles match	13:32
9	Fit Finlay defeated Sami Callihan	Singles match	23:00
10	Chuck Taylor defeated Johnny Gargano	Singles match	20:19

== Evolve 10: A Tribute To The Arena ==
Evolve 10: A Tribute To The Arena
- Promotion: Evolve Wrestling
- Date: January 14, 2012
- City: Philadelphia, Pennsylvania
- Venue: Asylum Arena
- Attendance: 800

No.	Results	Stipulations	Times
1	Low Ki defeated Ahtu (with Larry Dallas)	Singles match	1:51
2	Cheech defeated Cloudy	Singles match	10:13
3	The Scene (Caleb Konley and Scott Reed) (w/Larry Dallas) defeated Alex Reynolds and John Silver	Tag team match	9:46
4	Jigsaw defeated A. R. Fox	Singles match	11:10
5	Uhaa Nation (with Ricochet) defeated Pinkie Sanchez	Singles match	4:01
6	Ronin (Chuck Taylor and Rich Swann) defeated The Super Smash Brothers (Player Dos and Player Uno)	Tag team match	15:07
7	Jon Davis defeated Kyle Matthews	Singles match	4:31
8	Bobby Fish (with A. R. Fox) defeated Sami Callihan by submission	Singles match	15:56
9	Johnny Gargano (c) (with Chuck Taylor and Rich Swann) defeated Ricochet (with Uhaa Nation)	Singles match for the Open the Freedom Gate Championship by submission	24:21
10	Sabu defeated Justin Credible	Hardcore match	9:49
(c) / – the champion(s) heading into the match

== Evolve 11: Finlay vs. Callihan ==
Evolve 11: Finlay vs. Callihan
- Promotion: Evolve Wrestling
- Date: April 13, 2012
- City: Toronto, Ontario, Canada
- Venue: Doubletree By Hilton

No.	Results	Stipulations	Times
1	The Super Smash Brothers (Player Dos and Player Uno) defeated The Gentleman's Club (Drew Gulak and Jake Manning) (with Chuck Taylor)	Tag team match	10:43
2	Josh Alexander defeated MK McKinnan	Singles match	4:04
3	Mike Rollins defeated Ashley Sixx	Singles match	7:01
4	Alex Reynolds defeated John Silver	Singles match	12:21
5	Chuck Taylor defeated Johnny Gargano and Samuray del Sol by technical submission	Three-way elimination match	19:13
6	Caleb Konley (with Larry Dallas) defeated Adam Page by submission	Singles match	7:28
7	Low Ki defeated El Generico	Singles match	16:40
8	Dave Finlay defeated Sami Callihan by submission	Singles match	20:43

== Evolve 12: Fox vs. Callihan ==
Evolve 12: Fox vs. Callihan
- Promotion: Evolve Wrestling
- Date: May 11, 2012
- City: Charlotte, North Carolina
- Venue: Metrolina Tradeshow Expo Building A

No.	Results	Stipulations	Times
1	Jake Manning defeated Adam Page and Caleb Konley (with Amanda and Jonny Fairplay)	Three-way match	7:30
2	Alex Reynolds defeated Mike Cruz	Singles match	7:26
3	Low Ki defeated Jigsaw	Singles match	14:24
4	Dave Finlay defeated Jon Davis	Singles match	24:00
5	Chuck Taylor and Silas Young (with Jake Manning and The Swamp Monster) defeated Johnny Gargano and Samuray del Sol	Tag team match	10:19
6	Ricochet defeated El Generico	Singles match	16:32
7	A. R. Fox defeated Sami Callihan	Singles match	18:52

== Evolve 13: Gargano vs. Fox ==
Evolve 13: Gargano vs. Fox
- Promotion: Evolve Wrestling
- Date: May 12, 2012
- City: Concord, North Carolina
- Venue: Cabarrus Arena

No.	Results	Stipulations	Times
1	A. R. Fox defeated Jigsaw, Ricochet and Samuray del Sol	Four-way match	16:53
2	Silas Young defeated Adam Page by referee stoppage	Singles match	2:40
3	Caleb Konley (with Amanda and Jonny Fairplay) defeated Kyle Matthews by submission	Singles match	6:48
4	Alex Reynolds defeated Jake Manning	Singles match	12:04
5	Low Ki defeated Jon Davis	Singles match	14:02
6	Chuck Taylor (with Jake Manning and The Swamp Monster) defeated Mike Cruz	Singles match	7:10
7	El Generico defeated Sami Callihan	Singles match	22:17
8	Johnny Gargano (c) defeated A. R. Fox by submission	Singles match for the Open the Freedom Gate Championship	18:03
(c) / – the champion(s) heading into the match

== Evolve 14: Generico vs. del Sol ==
Evolve 14: Generico vs. del Sol
- Promotion: Evolve Wrestling
- Date: June 28, 2012
- City: Ybor City, Florida
- Venue: The Orpheum

No.	Results	Stipulations	Times
1	John Silver defeated Jake Manning (with Chuck Taylor and The Swamp Monster)	Singles match	7:11
2	Chuck Taylor (with Jake Manning and The Swamp Monster) defeated Colt Cabana by submission	Singles match	12:41
3	The Scene (Caleb Konley and Scott Reed) defeated Cheech Hernandez and Mike Cruz	Tag team match	8:41
4	Jon Davis defeated Tommy Taylor	2nd Annual Style Battle Tournament Round Robin Challenge match	10:45
5	Bobby Fish defeated A. R. Fox by submission	2nd Annual Style Battle Tournament Round Robin Challenge match	16:02
6	Sara Del Rey defeated Santana Garrett	Singles match	4:26
7	Tony Nese defeated Alex Reynolds, Johnny Gargano and Lince Dorado	Four-way match	9:34
8	El Generico defeated Samuray del Sol	Singles match	16:25

== Evolve 15: Generico vs. del Sol II ==
Evolve 15: Generico vs. del Sol II
- Promotion: Evolve Wrestling
- Date: June 29, 2012
- City: St. Petersburg, Florida
- Venue: The Wildwood Recreation Center

No.	Results	Stipulations	Times
1	Tony Nese defeated Mike Cruz	Singles match	7:49
2	Bobby Fish defeated Tommy Taylor by submission	2nd Annual Style Battle Tournament Round Robin Challenge match	9:49
3	Jon Davis defeated A. R. Fox	2nd Annual Style Battle Tournament Round Robin Challenge match	13:43
4	Lince Dorado defeated Alex Reynolds, Caleb Konley, Jake Manning, John Silver and Scott Reed	Six-way match	10:40
5	Colt Cabana defeated Cheech Hernandez	Singles match	5:36
6	Samuray del Sol defeated El Generico	Singles match	16:29
7	Johnny Gargano (c) defeated Chuck Taylor (with Jake Manning and The Swamp Monster) by submission	Singles match for the Open the Freedom Gate Championship	20:59
(c) / – the champion(s) heading into the match

== Evolve 16: Davis vs. Fish ==
Evolve 16: Davis vs. Fish
- Promotion: Evolve Wrestling
- Date: June 30, 2012
- City: Jacksonville, Florida
- Venue: Potter's House Gym

No.	Results	Stipulations	Times
1	The Scene (Caleb Konley and Scott Reed) defeated Damien Angel and Kennedy Kendrick	Tag team match	4:58
2	A. R. Fox defeated Tommy Taylor	2nd Annual Style Battle Tournament Round Robin Challenge match	8:15
3	A. R. Fox defeated Lince Dorado	Singles match	11:22
4	Alex Reynolds and John Silver defeated Cheech Hernandez and Mike Cruz	Tag team match	13:04
5	Jake Manning (with Chuck Taylor) defeated Blain Rage	Singles match	7:37
6	Johnny Gargano defeated Tony Nese by submission	Singles match	14:57
7	Samuray del Sol defeated Chuck Taylor (with Jake Manning and The Swamp Monster)	Singles match	13:04
8	Jon Davis defeated Bobby Fish	2nd Annual Style Battle Tournament Round Robin Challenge match	16:21

== Evolve 17: Generico vs. del Sol III ==
Evolve 17: Generico vs. del Sol III
- Promotion: Evolve Wrestling
- Date: September 8, 2012
- City: Voorhees, New Jersey
- Venue: Flyers Skate Zone

No.	Results	Stipulations	Times
1	Johnny Gargano (c) defeated Jon Davis by countout	Singles match for the Open the Freedom Gate Championship	11:20
2	Lince Dorado defeated Jigsaw	Singles match	9:21
3	Christina Von Eerie defeated Marti Belle	Singles match	1:56
4	DUF (Pinkie Sanchez and Sami Callihan) defeated The Scene (Caleb Konley and Scott Reed) (with Larry Dallas) by submission	Tag team match	5:28
5	MASADA defeated Sami Callihan by submission	Singles match	5:16
6	Rich Swann and The Super Smash Brothers (Player Dos and Player Uno) defeated The Gentleman's Club (Chuck Taylor, Drew Gulak and Orange Cassidy) (with Dr. Colonel Nolan Angus, Jake Manning and The Swamp Monster)	Six-man tag team match	18:17
7	Ricochet defeated A. R. Fox	Singles match	14:30
8	El Generico defeated Samuray del Sol	Singles match	14:09
(c) / – the champion(s) heading into the match

== Evolve 18: Gargano vs. Callihan ==
Evolve 18: Gargano vs. Callihan
- Promotion: Evolve Wrestling
- Date: December 8, 2012
- City: Voorhees, New Jersey
- Venue: Flyers Skate Zone

No.	Results	Stipulations	Times
1	A. R. Fox defeated Tony Nese	Singles match	13:01
2	MASADA defeated Papadon	Singles match	8:55
3	Larry Dallas and Papadon defeated Marti Belle	Handicap match	0:51
4	Rich Swann defeated Jigsaw	Singles match	13:15
5	Jon Davis defeated Chuck Taylor (with Drew Gulak and The Swamp Monster)	Singles match	9:51
6	El Generico and Samuray del Sol defeated The Super Smash Brothers (Player Dos and Player Uno)	Tag team match	19:09
7	Rich Swann defeated A. R. Fox, Jon Davis and MASADA	Four-way freestyle match	5:58
8	Johnny Gargano (c) defeated Sami Callihan by referee stoppage	Singles match for the Open the Freedom Gate Championship	25:44
(c) / – the champion(s) heading into the match

== Evolve 19: Crowning the Champion ==
Evolve 19: Crowning the Champion
- Promotion: Evolve Wrestling
- Date: April 5, 2013
- City: Secaucus, New Jersey
- Venue: Meadowlands Expo Center
- Attendance: ca. 500

No.	Results	Stipulations	Times
1	Sami Callihan defeated Jigsaw, Rich Swann and Samuray del Sol by submission	Tournament quarter-final four-way freestyle match	—
2	A. R. Fox defeated Jon Davis by disqualification	Tournament quarter-final match	14:02
3	Brian Kendrick and Johnny Gargano defeated The Gentleman's Club (Drew Gulak and Orange Cassidy) (with Dr. Colonel Nolan Angus and The Swamp Monster)	Tag team match	13:59
4	Sami Callihan defeated Chuck Taylor by submission	Tournament semi-final match	8:37
5	A. R. Fox defeated Ricochet	Tournament semi-final match	12:54
6	Arik Cannon defeated Scott Reed (with Caleb Konley, Larry Dallas and Trina Michaels)	No Disqualification match	7:28
7	The Super Smash Brothers (Player Dos and Player Uno) defeated The Young Bucks (Matt Jackson and Nick Jackson)	Tag team match	14:14
8	A. R. Fox defeated Sami Callihan	Tournament final match for the Evolve Championship	19:11

== Evolve 20: Fox vs. Jackson ==
Evolve 20: Fox vs. Jackson
- Promotion: Evolve Wrestling
- Date: May 30, 2013
- City: Orlando, Florida
- Venue: Orlando Armory

No.	Results	Stipulations	Times
1^{D}	Chasyn Rance and Santana Garrett defeated Derek Ryze and Mercedes Justine	Tag team match	—
2	Johnny Gargano defeated Matt Jackson by submission	Singles match	12:45
3	Brian Cage (with Larry Dallas and Trina Michaels) defeated Chuck Taylor	Singles match	8:54
4	Lince Dorado defeated Andrew Everett, Caleb Konley, Jon Davis, Shane Strickland and Tommy Taylor	Six-way fray match	16:31
5	Tomahawk T.T. defeated Eita	Singles match	15:43
6	The Bravado Brothers (Harlem Bravado and Lancelot Bravado) defeated Maxwell Chicago and Sugar Dunkerton	Tag team match	11:01
7	Anthony Nese defeated Samuray del Sol	Singles match	16:55
8	A. R. Fox (c) defeated Nick Jackson (with Matt Jackson)	Singles match for the Evolve Championship	14:47
(c) / – the champion(s) heading into the match; D / – this was a dark match

=== Six-way fray match ===
Draw	Entrat	Order	Eliminated by	Method of elimination	Time
1	Caleb Konley	4	Tommy Taylor	Pinned after a Cutter from the top turnbuckle	14:27
2	Shane Strickland	2	Jon Davis	Pinned after the 3 Seconds Around the World	11:57
3	Jon Davis	3	Lince Dorado and Tommy Taylor	Pinned after a Cutter from the top turnbuckle by Taylor	13:20
4	Andrew Everett	1	Jon Davis	Pinned after a Lariat	10:44
5	Lince Dorado	5	Winner	–	16:31
6	Tommy Taylor	6	Lince Dorado	Pinned after an Hurricanrana	16:31

== Evolve 21: USA vs. The World ==
Evolve 21: USA vs. The World
- Promotion: Evolve Wrestling
- Date: June 1, 2013
- City: Jacksonville, Florida
- Venue: Edge Concert Hall

No.	Results	Stipulations	Times
1^{D}	Chasyn Rance defeated Aron Agony, Beastly Brody, Jack LeDu, JD Amazing and Maxwell Chicago	Six-way fray match	—
2	Caleb Konley defeated Tommy Taylor	Singles match	11:08
3	Lince Dorado defeated Jonny Vandal	Singles match	6:41
4	The Bravado Brothers (Harlem Bravado and Lancelot Bravado) defeated Andrew Everett and Derek Ryze	Tag team match	6:27
5	Jon Davis defeated Chuck Taylor	No Disqualification match	17:40
6	Anthony Nese and Brian Cage (with Larry Dallas and Trina Michaels) defeated The Young Bucks (Matt Jackson and Nick Jackson)	Tag team match	18:35
7	Samuray del Sol defeated Shane Strickland	Singles match	14:00
8	A. R. Fox (c) defeated Eita (with Tomahawk T.T.)	Singles match for the Evolve Championship	10:00
9	Tomahawk T.T. (with Eita) defeated Johnny Gargano	Singles match	14:51
10	A. R. Fox and Johnny Gargano defeated Eita and Tomahawk T.T. by submission	Tag team match	5:34
(c) / – the champion(s) heading into the match; D / – this was a dark match

== Evolve 22: Gargano vs. del Sol ==
Evolve 22: Gargano vs. del Sol
- Promotion: Evolve Wrestling
- Date: June 2, 2013
- City: Ybor City, Florida
- Venue: The Orpheum

No.	Results	Stipulations	Times
1^{D}	Maxwell Chicago defeated Chasyn Rance	Singles match	—
2	Caleb Konley defeated Chuck Taylor by submission	Singles match	10:21
3	Ivelisse defeated Mia Yim	Singles match	9:09
4	Anthony Nese defeated Tommy Taylor	Singles match	15:30
5	Dos Ben Dejos (Eddie Rios and Jay Cruz) and Shane Strickland defeated The Bravado Brothers (Harlem Bravado and Lancelot Bravado) and Andrew Everett	Six-man tag team match	12:48
6	A. R. Fox (c) defeated Lince Dorado	Singles match for the Evolve Championship	17:02
7	Brian Cage (with Larry Dallas and Trina Michaels) defeated Derek Ryze	Singles match	0:30
8	Jon Davis defeated Brian Cage (with Larry Dallas and Trina Michaels)	Singles match	7:58
9	Johnny Gargano (c) defeated Samuray del Sol by submission	Singles match for the Open the Freedom Gate Championship	22:19
10	The Young Bucks (Matt Jackson and Nick Jackson) (c) defeated Eita and Tomahawk T.T.	Tag team match for the Open the United Gate Championship	18:47
(c) / – the champion(s) heading into the match; D / – this was a dark match

== Evolve 23: Fox vs. Nese ==
Evolve 23: Fox vs. Nese
- Promotion: Evolve Wrestling
- Date: September 21, 2013
- City: Ridgewood, Queens, New York
- Venue: Guzman Sports Lounge

No.	Results	Stipulations
1	The Gentleman's Club (Chuck Taylor and Orange Cassidy) defeated Dos Ben Dejos (Jay Cruz and Jay Rios)	Young Bucks Invitational Tag team match
2	Caleb Konley defeated Matt Jackson by submission	Singles match
3	The Bravado Brothers (Harlem Bravado and Lancelot Bravado) defeated Jigsaw and The Shard	Young Bucks Invitational Tag team match
4	Brian XL defeated Earl Cooter	Singles match
5	Drew Gulak defeated Lince Dorado, Mark Angelosetti and Shane Strickland by submission	Style Battle 2013 Tournament First Round four-way elimination match
6	Biff Busick defeated Green Ant, Josh Alexander) and Maxwell Chicago	Style Battle 2013 Tournament First Round four-way elimination match
7	WORLD-1 International (Rich Swann and Ricochet) defeated Johnny Gargano and Trent	Tag team match
8	A. R. Fox (c) defeated Anthony Nese	Singles match for the Evolve Championship
(c) / – the champion(s) heading into the match

== Evolve 24: Fox vs. Ricochet ==
Evolve 24: Fox vs. Ricochet
- Promotion: Evolve Wrestling
- Date: September 22, 2013
- City: New York City, New York
- Venue: The Brooklyn Lyceum

No.	Results	Stipulations
1	Lince Dorado defeated Green Ant, Mark Angelosetti and Mike Rollins	Four-way match
2	Shane Strickland defeated Matt Jackson	Singles match
3	Su Yung (with Anthony Nese) defeated Ivelisse	Singles match
4	Anthony Nese (with Mr. A and Su Yung) defeated Josh Alexander)	Singles match
5	Trent defeated Maxwell Chicago	Singles match
6	Trent defeated Caleb Konley	Singles match
7	The Bravado Brothers (Harlem Bravado and Lancelot Bravado) defeated The Gentleman's Club (Chuck Taylor and Orange Cassidy), Dos Ben Dejos (Jay Cruz and Jay Rios) and Jigsaw and The Shard	Young Bucks Invitational Four-way tag team match
8	Drew Gulak defeated Biff Busick by submission	Style Battle 2013 Tournament Final match
9	Johnny Gargano (c) defeated Rich Swann by submission	Singles match for the Open the Freedom Gate Championship
10	A. R. Fox defeated Ricochet	Evolution's End match
(c) / – the champion(s) heading into the match

== Evolve 25: Fox vs. Richards ==
Evolve 25: Fox vs. Richards
- Promotion: Evolve Wrestling
- Date: January 10, 2014
- City: Ybor City, Florida
- Venue: The Orpheum

No.	Results	Stipulations	Times
1	Trent Barreta (c) defeated Tony Nese (with Su Yung)	Singles match for the FIP World Heavyweight Championship	23:09
2	Uhaa Nation defeated Caleb Konley, Chuck Taylor, Jon Davis and Lince Dorado	Five-way fray match	11:26
3	Ricochet defeated Chris Hero	Singles match	22:47
4	The Young Bucks (Matt Jackson and Nick Jackson) and Rich Swann defeated The Bravado Brothers (Harlem Bravado and Lancelot Bravado) and Johnny Gargano	Six-man tag team match	19:49
5	A. R. Fox (c) defeated Davey Richards	Singles match for the Evolve Championship	19:18
(c) / – the champion(s) heading into the match

== Evolve 26: Hero vs. Nese ==
Evolve 26: Hero vs. Nese
- Promotion: Evolve Wrestling
- Date: January 11, 2014
- City: Orlando, Florida
- Venue: Orlando Downtown Recreation Complex

No.	Results	Stipulations	Times
1^{D}	Chico Adams, Gabriel Black and Tim Zbyszko defeated Jason Cade, Josh Hess and Zane Riley	Six-man tag team match	—
2^{D}	Kennedy Kendrick defeated Aaron Solo	Singles match	—
3	Mia Yim defeated Su Yung	Singles match	6:07
4	Lince Dorado defeated Caleb Konley	Singles match	11:16
5	Chuck Taylor defeated Maxwell Chicago	Singles match	8:16
6	The Bravado Brothers (Harlem Bravado and Lancelot Bravado) (c) defeated Dos Ben Dejos (Eddie Rios and Jay Cruz)	Tag team match for the Open the United Gate Championship	14:49
7	Ricochet defeated Trent Barreta	Singles match	18:25
8	A. R. Fox and Uhaa Nation defeated Johnny Gargano and Jon Davis	Tag team match	24:29
9	Chris Hero defeated Anthony Nese by submission	Singles match	20:29
10	The Young Bucks (Matt Jackson and Nick Jackson) defeated Chuck Taylor and Rich Swann	Tag team match	12:48
(c) / – the champion(s) heading into the match; D / – this was a dark match

== Evolve 27: Gargano vs. Nation ==
Evolve 27: Gargano vs. Nation
- Promotion: Evolve Wrestling
- Date: January 12, 2014
- City: Jacksonville, Florida
- Venue: The Edge Concert Hall

No.	Results	Stipulations
1^{D}	Kennedy Kendrick defeated Gabriel Black and Zane Riley	Three-way match
2	Caleb Konley defeated Lince Dorado	Singles match
3	Dos Ben Dejos (Eddie Rios and Jay Cruz) defeated Johnny Vandal and Maxwell Chicago	Tag team match
4	Rich Swann defeated Jon Davis	Grudge match
5	Nick Jackson defeated Lance Bravado by disqualification	Singles match
6	Harlem Bravado vs. Matt Jackson ended in no-contest	Singles match
7	Chris Hero defeated Chuck Taylor by submission	Singles match
8	Anthony Nese and Trent Barreta defeated A. R. Fox and Ricochet	Tag team match
9	Johnny Gargano (c) defeated Uhaa Nation by submission	Singles match for the Open the Freedom Gate Championship
(c) / – the champion(s) heading into the match; D / – this was a dark match

== Evolve 28: Hero vs. Barreta ==
Evolve 28: Hero vs. Barreta
- Promotion: Evolve Wrestling
- Date: April 3, 2014
- City: New Orleans, Louisiana
- Venue: McAlister Auditorium

No.	Results	Stipulations	Times
1^{D}	Bu Ku Dao, J. Spade and Purple Haze defeated Danny Flamingo, Matt Lancie and Ricky Starks	Six-man tag team match	—
2^{D}	Mike Dell (c) defeated Wes Adams	Singles match for the WildKat Heavyweight Championship	—
3	Biff Busick defeated Drew Gulak by submission	Singles match	16:00
4	Green Ant defeated Maxwell Chicago by submission	Singles match	11:00
5	A. R. Fox defeated Caleb Konley	Singles match	18:00
6	Moose defeated Unknown Male Wrestler	Singles match	—
7	The Bravado Brothers (Harlem Bravado and Lancelot Bravado) (c) (with Moose) defeated The Gentleman's Club (Chuck Taylor and Orange Cassidy)	Tag team match for the Open the United Gate Championship	12:00
8	Ricochet defeated Anthony Nese	Singles match	18:00
9	Johnny Gargano defeated Rich Swann	Singles match	15:00
10	Chris Hero (c) defeated Trent Barreta	Singles match for the Evolve Championship	30:00
(c) / – the champion(s) heading into the match; D / – this was a dark match

== Evolve 29: Fox/Nation vs. Nese/Barreta ==
Evolve 29: Fox/Nation vs. Nese/Barreta
- Promotion: Evolve Wrestling
- Date: May 9, 2014
- City: Elmhurst, New York
- Venue: Queensboro Elks Lodge

No.	Results	Stipulations	Times
1	Blake Edward Belakus defeated J. T. Dunn (with Shelly Martinez)	Singles match	6:00
2	The Bravado Brothers (Harlem Bravado and Lancelot Bravado) (with Moose) defeated Monster Mafia (Ethan Page and Josh Alexander)	Tag team match	14:00
3	Rich Swann defeated Caleb Konley (with Mr. A and Su Yung)	Singles match	18:00
4	Biff Busick defeated Johnny Gargano by submission	Singles match	19:00
5	The Colony (Fire Ant and Green Ant) defeated Jigsaw and Tim Donst by submission	Tag team match	14:00
6	Drew Gulak defeated Chuck Taylor by submission	Singles match	16:00
7	A. R. Fox and Uhaa Nation defeated The Premier Athlete Brand (Anthony Nese and Trent Barreta) (with Mr. A and Su Yung)	Tag team match	17:00

== Evolve 30: Barreta Vs. Nation ==
Evolve 30: Barreta Vs. Nation
- Promotion: Evolve Wrestling
- Date: May 10, 2014
- City: New York City, New York
- Venue: Brooklyn Lyceum

No.	Results	Stipulations
1	Caleb Konley defeated A. R. Fox	Singles match
2	Blake Edward Belakus defeated Ryan Rush	Singles match
3	Josh Alexander defeated Tim Donst	Singles match
4	Jigsaw defeated Chuck Taylor and Ethan Page	Three-way match
5	The Bravado Brothers (Harlem Bravado and Lancelot Bravado) (c) (with Moose) defeated The Colony (Fire Ant and Green Ant)	Tag team match for the Open the United Gate Championship
6	Moose defeated Mr. A	Singles match
7	Tony Nese defeated Rich Swann	Singles match
8	Uhaa Nation defeated Trent Barreta (with Su Yung)	Singles match
9	A. R. Fox, Rich Swann and Uhaa Nation defeated The Premier Athlete Brand (Caleb Konley, Tony Nese and Trent Barreta)	Tables and chairs Six-man tag team match
(c) / – the champion(s) heading into the match

== Evolve 31: Hero vs. Galloway ==
Evolve 31: Hero vs. Galloway
- Promotion: Evolve Wrestling
- Date: August 8, 2014
- City: Ybor City, Florida
- Venue: The Orpheum

No.	Results	Stipulations	Times
1^{D}	Chasyn Rance (c) defeated Trevor Lee	Singles match for the FIP Florida Heritage Championship	—
2	Drew Gulak defeated Timothy Thatcher by submission	Style Battle 2014 Tournament Round Robin Challenge match	15:29
3	Biff Busick defeated James Raideen by technical submission	Style Battle 2014 Tournament Round Robin Challenge match	8:30
4	Dos Ben Dejos (Eddie Rios and Jay Cruz) and Lince Dorado defeated Jesus De Leon and The Juicy Product (David Starr and J. T. Dunn)	Six-man tag team match	10:50
5	Matt Sydal defeated Johnny Gargano	Singles match	29:49
6	The Premier Athlete Brand (Anthony Nese and Caleb Konley) (with Su Yung) defeated The Inner City Machine Guns (Rich Swann and Ricochet) (with Ivelisse)	Tag team match	21:46
7	Drew Galloway defeated Chris Hero (c)	Singles match for the Evolve Championship	17:21
(c) / – the champion(s) heading into the match; D / – this was a dark match

== Evolve 32: Sydal vs. Ricochet ==
Evolve 32: Sydal vs. Ricochet
- Promotion: Evolve Wrestling
- Date: August 9, 2014
- City: Orlando, Florida
- Venue: Northwest Community Center

No.	Results	Stipulations	Times
1	Drew Galloway (c) defeated Anthony Nese	Singles match for the Evolve Championship	11:38
2	James Raideen defeated Drew Gulak	Style Battle 2014 Tournament Round Robin Challenge match	10:09
3	Timothy Thatcher defeated Biff Busick by submission	Style Battle 2014 Tournament Round Robin Challenge match	15:56
4	Caleb Konley defeated Johnny Gargano	Singles match	16:14
5	Rich Swann defeated Chris Hero	Singles match	19:36
6	Ricochet (c) defeated Matt Sydal	Singles match for the Open the Freedom Gate Championship	15:20
(c) / – the champion(s) heading into the match

== Evolve 33: Gargano vs. Swann - Evolution's End ==
Evolve 33: Gargano vs. Swann - Evolution's End
- Promotion: Evolve Wrestling
- Date: August 10, 2014
- City: Jacksonville, Florida
- Venue: 1904 Music Hall

No.	Results	Stipulations	Times
1^{D}	Trevor Lee and Zane Riley defeated Aaron Epic and Jason Cade	Tag team match	—
2^{D}	The Juicy Product (David Starr and J. T. Dunn) (c) defeated Dos Ben Dejos (Eddie Rios and Jay Cruz)	Tag team match for the FIP Tag Team Championship	—
3	Tony Nese defeated Lince Dorado by submission	Singles match	3:49
4	Chris Hero defeated Caleb Konley	Singles match	15:18
5	Timothy Thatcher defeated James Raideen by submission	Style Battle 2014 Tournament Round Robin Challenge match	6:43
6	Biff Busick defeated Drew Gulak	Style Battle 2014 Tournament Round Robin Challenge match	16:20
7	Ricochet defeated Drew Galloway	Singles match	13:52
8	Rich Swann defeated Johnny Gargano	Evolution's End match	22:17
(c) / – the champion(s) heading into the match; D / – this was a dark match

== Evolve 34: Galloway vs. Swann ==
Evolve 34: Galloway vs. Swann
- Promotion: Evolve Wrestling
- Date: September 13, 2014
- City: New York City, New York
- Venue: Queensboro Elks Lodge

No.	Results	Stipulations
1	Johnny Gargano defeated Anthony Nese	Singles match
2	Zack Sabre Jr. defeated Timothy Thatcher by submission	Singles match
3	Uhaa Nation defeated Roderick Strong	Singles match
4	Caleb Konley (with Mr. A and Su Yung) defeated Ricochet	Singles match
5	A. R. Fox defeated Moose by disqualification	Singles match
6	The Bravado Brothers (Harlem Bravado and Lancelot Bravado) (c) defeated The Colony (Fire Ant & Silver Ant)	Tag team match for the Open the United Gate Championship
7	Drew Galloway (c) defeated Rich Swann by submission	Singles match for the Evolve Championship
(c) / – the champion(s) heading into the match

== Evolve 35 ==
Evolve 35
- Promotion: Evolve Wrestling
- Date: September 14, 2014
- City: New York City, New York
- Venue: The Brooklyn Lyceum

No.	Results	Stipulations	Times
1^{D}	Jeff Gallow defeated JDK	Singles match	—
2^{D}	Jesus De Leon (c) defeated Donovan Dijak and Shynron	Three-way match for the FTW World Heavyweight Championship	—
3	Johnny Gargano defeated Drew Gulak by submission	Singles match	17:05
4	Timothy Thatcher defeated Tracy Williams by submission	Singles match	9:18
5	Drew Galloway defeated Roderick Strong	Singles match	17:20
6	Biff Busick defeated Zack Sabre Jr. by technical submission	Singles match	18:34
7	The Premier Athlete Brand (Anthony Nese and Caleb Konley) (with Mr. A and Su Yung) defeated The Bravado Brothers (Harlem Bravado and Lancelot Bravado) (c) (with Moose) and A. R. Fox and Rich Swann	Three-way tag team elimination match for the Open the United Gate Championship	17:02
8	Ricochet (c) defeated Uhaa Nation	Singles match for the Open the Freedom Gate Championship	22:50
(c) / – the champion(s) heading into the match; D / – this was a dark match

Elimination match

Eliminated	Team	Eliminated by	Method of elimination	Time
1	The Bravado Brothers	A. R. Fox and Rich Swann	Harlem Bravado was pinned by A. R. Fox	11:15
2	A. R. Fox and Rich Swann	The Premier Athlete Brand	Rich Swann was pinned by Anthony Nese	17:02
Winners	The Premier Athlete Brand	—N/a		17:02

== Evolve 36 ==
Evolve 36
- Promotion: Evolve Wrestling
- Date: January 9, 2015
- City: Ybor City, Florida
- Venue: The Orpheum

No.	Results	Stipulations	Times
1	Johnny Gargano (c) defeated Shane Strickland (with Rich Swann) by submission	Singles match for the Open the Freedom Gate Championship	15:00
2	Biff Busick defeated Trevor Lee by submission	Singles match	13:11
3	A. R. Fox and Uhaa Nation defeated The Bravado Brothers (Harlem Bravado and Lancelot Bravado) (with Moose)	Tag team match	16:35
4	Ricochet defeated Timothy Thatcher	Singles match	17:20
5	Rich Swann defeated Anthony Nese (with Caleb Konley and Su Yung)	10-minute flash match	10:00
6	Drew Galloway vs. Roderick Strong ended in no-contest	Grudge match	9:11
(c) / – the champion(s) heading into the match

== Evolve 37 ==
Evolve 37
- Promotion: Evolve Wrestling
- Date: January 10, 2015
- City: Winter Park, Florida
- Venue: Dickinson Activity Center

No.	Results	Stipulations	Times
1	Anthony Nese (with Caleb Konley, SoCal Val and Su Yung) defeated Shane Strickland by submission	Singles match	11:59
2	Timothy Thatcher defeated Roderick Strong by submission	Singles match	17:11
3	Trevor Lee defeated A. R. Fox by referee stoppage	Singles match	4:17
4	Biff Busick defeated Uhaa Nation by submission	Singles match	14:10
5	Drew Galloway (c) defeated Ricochet	Singles match for the Evolve Championship	13:45
6	Ronin (Chuck Taylor, Johnny Gargano and Rich Swann) defeated Moose and The Bravado Brothers (Harlem Bravado and Lancelot Bravado)	Six-man tag team match; losing team must split–up	14:01
(c) / – the champion(s) heading into the match

== Evolve 38 ==
Evolve 38
- Promotion: Evolve Wrestling
- Date: March 8, 2015
- City: Deer Park, New York
- Venue: The Sportatorium

No.	Results	Stipulations	Times
1	Biff Busick defeated Martin Stone by submission	Singles match	5:14
2	Team Tremendous (Bill Carr and Dan Barry) defeated Earl Cooter and Jody Kristofferson (with Larry Dallas)	Tag team match	10:23
3	A. R. Fox defeated Matt Cage	Singles match	12:12
4	Chris Hero defeated Drew Gulak	Singles match	19:10
5	P. J. Black defeated Caleb Konley (with Anthony Nese)	Singles match	12:24
6	Davey Richards defeated Anthony Nese (with Caleb Konley) by submission	Singles match	21:16
7	Roderick Strong defeated Drew Galloway by referee stoppage	Steel cage match	19:13

== Evolve 39 ==
Evolve 39
- Promotion: Evolve Wrestling
- Date: March 26, 2015
- City: San Jose, California
- Venue: Santa Clara County Fairgrounds

No.	Results	Stipulations	Times
1	Drew Gulak defeated Timothy Thatcher	Singles match	13:16
2	Biff Busick defeated Tommy End by technical submission	Singles match	9:34
3	Chris Hero defeated Ethan Page	Singles match	14:25
4	Rich Swann, Ricochet and Uhaa Nation defeated The Premier Athlete Brand (Brian Cage and Caleb Konley) and T. J. Perkins (with Andrea and SoCal Val)	Six-man tag team match	21:31
5	Johnny Gargano (with Ethan Page) (c) defeated A. R. Fox	Singles match for the Open the Freedom Gate Championship	21:48
6	Drew Galloway (c) defeated P. J. Black	Singles match for the Evolve Championship	18:15
(c) / – the champion(s) heading into the match

== Evolve 40 ==
Evolve 40
- Promotion: Evolve Wrestling
- Date: March 27, 2015
- City: San Jose, California
- Venue: Santa Clara County Fairgrounds

No.	Results	Stipulations	Times
1	Drew Galloway defeated Uhaa Nation	Singles match	11:16
2	Timothy Thatcher defeated Tommy End (with Chris Hero) by submission	Singles match	16:26
3	Drew Gulak defeated T. J. Perkins by submission	Singles match	12:12
4	A. R. Fox defeated Ethan Page	Singles match	13:37
5	Chris Hero defeated Biff Busick	Singles match	19:37
6	The Premier Athlete Brand (Brian Cage and Caleb Konley) (with Andrea and SoCal Val) defeated Ronin (Johnny Gargano and Rich Swann) by referee stoppage	Tag team match	15:27
7	Ricochet defeated P. J. Black	Singles match	14:25

== Evolve 41 ==
Evolve 41
- Promotion: Evolve Wrestling
- Date: April 17, 2015
- City: Ybor City, Florida
- Venue: The Orpheum

No.	Results	Stipulations	Times
1	Anthony Nese (with Andrea, Caleb Konley, SoCal Val and Su Yung) defeated Martin Stone	Singles match by submission	15:48
2	Caleb Konley (with Andrea, Anthony Nese, SoCal Val and Su Yung) defeated Rey Horus	Singles match	14:07
3	T. J. Perkins defeated Biff Busick by referee stoppage	Singles match	13:03
4	Ethan Page defeated Rich Swann	Singles match	13:50
5	Davey Richards defeated Johnny Gargano	Singles match	18:19
6	Roderick Strong defeated Timothy Thatcher 2-1	Two-out-of-three falls match to determine the #1 contender for the Evolve Championship	24:10

== Evolve 42 ==
Evolve 42
- Promotion: Evolve Wrestling
- Date: April 18, 2015
- City: Ybor City, Florida
- Venue: Barnett Park and Gym

No.	Results	Stipulations	Times
1	Santana (c) defeated Andrea (with SoCal Val and Su Yung)	Singles match for the Shine Championship	5:08
2	Ethan Page defeated Martin Stone	Singles match	9:51
3	Rey Horus defeated Andrew Everett	Singles match	9:12
4	Timothy Thatcher defeated T. J. Perkins by submission	Singles match	12:53
5	Biff Busick defeated Roderick Strong by technical submission	Singles match	11:30
6	Davey Richards defeated Trevor Lee	Singles match	8:16
7	Ronin (Johnny Gargano and Rich Swann) defeated The Premier Athlete Brand (Anthony Nese and Caleb Konley) (c) (with Andrea and SoCal Val)	Tag team Street Fight match for the Open the United Gate Championship	26:12
(c) / – the champion(s) heading into the match

== Evolve 43 ==
Evolve 43
- Promotion: Evolve Wrestling
- Date: May 30, 2015
- City: Woodside, New York
- Venue: LaBoom

No.	Results	Stipulations	Times
1	Rey Horus defeated Anthony Nese (with Caleb Konley and SoCal Val)	Singles match	15:39
2	Davey Richards defeated Caleb Konley (with SoCal Val)	Singles match	20:58
3	T. J. Perkins defeated Mike Bailey	Singles match	11:14
4	Chris Hero defeated Trevor Lee	Singles match	18:03
5	Ronin (Johnny Gargano and Rich Swann) (c) defeated Drew Gulak and Tracy Williams by submission	Tag team match for the Open the United Gate Championship	16:41
6	Drew Galloway (c) defeated Biff Busick	Singles match for the Open the Freedom Gate Championship	14:50
(c) / – the champion(s) heading into the match

== Evolve 44 ==
Evolve 44
- Promotion: Evolve Wrestling
- Date: May 31, 2015
- City: Ronkonkoma, New York
- Venue: Ronkonkoma Fire Department Hall

No.	Results	Stipulations	Times
1	Ethan Page defeated Johnny Gargano by technical submission	Grudge match	15:39
2	Trevor Lee defeated Rich Swann	Singles match	10:50
3	Rey Horus defeated Tracy Williams	Singles match	5:11
4	The Premier Athlete Brand (Anthony Nese and Caleb Konley) (with SoCal Val) defeated Rey Horus and T. J. Perkins	Tag team match	9:49
5	Biff Busick defeated Mike Bailey by technical submission	Singles match	10:02
6	Davey Richards defeated Drew Gulak	Singles match	19:49
7	Drew Galloway (c) defeated Roderick Strong	Singles match for the Evolve Championship	22:55
(c) / – the champion(s) heading into the match

== Evolve 45 ==
Evolve 45
- Promotion: Evolve Wrestling
- Date: July 10, 2015
- City: Ybor City, Florida
- Venue: The Orpheum

No.	Results	Stipulations	Times
1	Caleb Konley defeated Gary Jay	Singles match	10:58
2	Trent Barreta defeated Rich Swann	Singles match	16:30
3	Andrew Everett defeated Anthony Nese	Singles match	15:06
4	Chris Hero defeated Trevor Lee	Singles match	13:47
5	Zack Sabre Jr. defeated Roderick Strong by submission	Singles match	28:24
6	Timothy Thatcher (Open the Freedom Gate Champion) defeated Drew Galloway (Evolve Champion) by submission	Singles match for the Evolve Championship and Open the Freedom Gate Championship	15:32

== Evolve 46 ==
Evolve 46
- Promotion: Evolve Wrestling
- Date: July 11, 2015
- City: Orlando, Florida
- Venue: Barnett Park Gymnasium

No.	Results	Stipulations	Times
1	Trevor Lee defeated Anthony Nese (with Andrea, Caleb Konley and SoCal Val)	Singles match	10:47
2	Zack Sabre Jr. defeated T. J. Perkins by submission	Singles match	14:56
3	Drew Galloway defeated Trent Barreta (with Andrea and SoCal Val)	Singles match	16:50
4	Timothy Thatcher (c) defeated Chris Hero by submission	Singles match for the Evolve Championship	23:38
(c) / – the champion(s) heading into the match

== Evolve 47 ==
Evolve 47
- Promotion: Evolve Wrestling
- Date: August 15, 2015
- City: Woodside, New York
- Venue: La Boom

No.	Results	Stipulations	Times
1	Tracy Williams (with Drew Gulak) defeated Biff Busick by submission	Singles match	13:13
2	Drew Gulak (with Tracy Williams) defeated Rich Swann	Singles match	12:14
3	Chris Hero defeated Mike Bailey	Singles match	11:52
4	The Premier Athlete Brand (Anthony Nese and Caleb Konley) (with SoCal Val) defeated Rey Horus and Trent	Tag team match	15:59
5	Ethan Page defeated Johnny Gargano	"Anything goes" match	14:24
6	Timothy Thatcher (c) defeated Zack Sabre Jr. by submission	Singles match for the Evolve Championship	23:54
(c) / – the champion(s) heading into the match

== Evolve 48 ==
Evolve 48
- Promotion: Evolve Wrestling
- Date: August 16, 2015
- City: Deer Park, New York
- Venue: The Sportatorium

No.	Results	Stipulations	Times
1	Anthony Nese (with SoCal Val) defeated Ethan Page (with Rich Swann)	Singles match	13:15
2	Rich Swann (with Ethan Page) defeated Johnny Gargano	Singles match	12:38
3	Caleb Konley (with SoCal Val) defeated Trent Barreta	Singles match	16:55
4	Catch Point (Drew Gulak and Tracy Williams) defeated Mike Bailey and Rey Horus	Tag team match	21:13
5	Chris Hero defeated Zack Sabre Jr.	Singles match	24:28
6	Timothy Thatcher defeated Biff Busick by submission	No Holds Barred match	13:36

== Evolve 49 ==
Evolve 49
- Promotion: Evolve Wrestling
- Date: October 17, 2015
- City: New York City, New York
- Venue: La Boom

No.	Results	Stipulations	Times
1	Andrew Everett defeated Anthony Nese (with SoCal Val), Matt Cage and Peter Kaasa	Four-way match	9:20
2	Matt Riddle defeated Jonathan Gresham by submission	Singles match	4:45
3	Chris Dickinson defeated Tracy Williams by submission	Singles match	13:22
4	Trevor Lee defeated Drew Gulak (with Tracy Williams)	Singles match to determine the #1 contender for the Evolve Championship	19:56
5	The Premier Athlete Brand (Anthony Nese and Caleb Konley) (with SoCal Val) defeated Milk Chocolate (Brandon Watts and Randy Summers)	Tag team match	3:31
6	Willie Mack defeated Earl Cooter	Singles match	5:28
7	Roppongi Vice (Beretta and Rocky Romero) defeated Timothy Thatcher and T. J. Perkins	Tag team match	17:24
8	Johnny Gargano defeated Ethan Page	"I Quit" match	26:00

== Evolve 50 ==
Evolve 50
- Promotion: Evolve Wrestling
- Date: October 18, 2015
- City: Deer Park, New York
- Venue: The Sportatorium

No.	Results	Stipulations	Times
1^{D}	Alex Mason, Rude Boy Riley and Sonny Kiss defeated Ace Romero, JGeorge and Mike Orlando	Six-man tag team match	—
2	Tracy Williams defeated T. J. Perkins by submission	Singles match	15:49
3	Matt Cage defeated Ethan Page	Singles match	10:20
4	Peter Kaasa defeated Andrew Everett	Singles match	11:40
5	Matt Riddle defeated Chris Dickinson	Singles match	4:22
6	Drew Gulak (with Tracy Williams) defeated Willie Mack	Singles match	16:29
7	Timothy Thatcher (c) defeated Trevor Lee by submission	Singles match for the Evolve Championship	15:52
8	Roppongi Vice (Beretta and Rocky Romero) defeated The Premier Athlete Brand (Anthony Nese and Caleb Konley) (with SoCal Val)	Tag team match	21:36
(c) / – the champion(s) heading into the match; D / – this was a dark match

== Evolve 51 ==
Evolve 51
- Promotion: Evolve Wrestling
- Date: November 6, 2015
- City: Ybor City, Florida
- Venue: The Orpheum

No.	Results	Stipulations	Times
1	Peter Kaasa defeated Ethan Page	Singles match	14:24
2	Matt Riddle defeated Drew Gulak (with Tracy Williams) by submission	Singles match	12:48
3	Lio Rush defeated Fred Yehi	Singles match	9:52
4	Tracy Williams defeated Martin Stone by submission	Singles match	14:15
5	T. J. Perkins defeated Anthony Nese (with Andrea) by submission	Singles match	18:44
6	Drew Galloway defeated Caleb Konley	Singles match	11:32
7	Timothy Thatcher (c) defeated Johnny Gargano	Singles match for the Evolve Championship	28:22
(c) / – the champion(s) heading into the match

== Evolve 52 ==
Evolve 52
- Promotion: Evolve Wrestling
- Date: November 7, 2015
- City: Orlando, Florida
- Venue: Barnett Park Gymnasium

No.	Results	Stipulations	Times
1	Ethan Page defeated Lio Rush	Singles match	12:42
2	Anthony Nese (with Andrea and SoCal Val) defeated Peter Kaasa	Singles match	12:45
3	Matt Riddle defeated Tracy Williams (with Drew Gulak) by submission	Singles match	6:37
4	Caleb Konley (with Andrea and SoCal Val) defeated T. J. Perkins	Singles match	17:50
5	Drew Gulak (with Tracy Williams) defeated Johnny Gargano by technical submission	Singles match	23:12
6	Timothy Thatcher (c) defeated Drew Galloway by submission	Singles match for the Evolve Championship	16:35
7	Catch Point (Drew Gulak and T. J. Perkins) (with Tracy Williams) vs. Matt Riddle and Timothy Thatcher ended in no-contest	Tag team match	1:49
(c) / – the champion(s) heading into the match

== Evolve 53 ==
Evolve 53
- Promotion: Evolve Wrestling
- Date: January 22, 2016
- City: Ybor City, Florida
- Venue: The Orpheum

No.	Results	Stipulations	Times
1^{D}	Kennedy Kendrick defeated Beastly Brody	Singles match	—
2	The Bravado Brothers (Harlem Bravado and Lancelot Bravado) defeated The Premier Athlete Brand (Anthony Nese and Caleb Konley) (with Andrea and SoCal Val)	Evolve Tag Team Championship Tournament first round match	12:57
3	Jason Cade defeated Joe Coleman	Singles match	3:46
4	Matt Riddle (with Drew Gulak) defeated Peter Kaasa by submission	Style Battle 2016 Tournament Round Robin Challenge match	4:47
5	P. J. Black defeated Ethan Page	Singles match	9:59
6	Roppongi Vice (Barreta and Rocky Romero) defeated Team Tremendous (Bill Carr and Dan Barry)	Evolve Tag Team Championship Tournament first round match	15:33
7	Tracy Williams defeated Fred Yehi by submission	Style Battle 2016 Tournament Round Robin Challenge match	14:51
8	Heroes Eventually Die (Chris Hero and Tommy End) defeated Sami Callihan and Zack Sabre Jr.	Evolve Tag Team Championship Tournament first round match	28:15
9	Drew Galloway and Johnny Gargano defeated Catch Point (Drew Gulak and T. J. Perkins) (with Matt Riddle and Tracy Williams)	Evolve Tag Team Championship Tournament first round match	15:31
D / – this was a dark match

== Evolve 54 ==
Evolve 54
- Promotion: Evolve Wrestling
- Date: January 23, 2016
- City: Orlando, Florida
- Venue: Orlando Downtown Recreation Complex

No.	Results	Stipulations	Times
1	Team Tremendous (Bill Carr and Dan Barry) defeated The Premier Athlete Brand (Anthony Nese and Caleb Konley) (with Andrea and SoCal Val)	Second chance Evolve Tag Team Championship Tournament first round match	13:43
2	Matt Riddle defeated Fred Yehi by submission	Style Battle 2016 Tournament Round Robin Challenge match	6:04
3	Tommaso Ciampa defeated Ethan Page	Singles match	17:42
4	Catch Point (Drew Gulak and T. J. Perkins) (with Matt Riddle and Tracy Williams) defeated Sami Callihan and Zack Sabre Jr. by submission	Second chance Evolve Tag Team Championship Tournament first round match	17:15
5	Tracy Williams (with Drew Gulak) defeated Peter Kaasa by submission	Style Battle 2016 Tournament Round Robin Challenge match	14:56
6	Drew Galloway and Johnny Gargano defeated The Bravado Brothers (Harlem Bravado and Lancelot Bravado) by submission	Evolve Tag Team Championship Tournament semi-final match	19:06
7	Heroes Eventually Die (Chris Hero and Tommy End) defeated Roppongi Vice (Beretta and Rocky Romero)	Evolve Tag Team Championship Tournament semi-final match	27:19

== Evolve 55 ==
Evolve 55
- Promotion: Evolve Wrestling
- Date: January 24, 2016
- City: Orlando, Florida
- Venue: Orlando Downtown Recreation Complex

No.	Results	Stipulations	Times
1	Anthony Nese (with Andrea and SoCal Val) defeated Ethan Page, Fred Yehi and Jason Cade	Four-way match	6:58
2	Caleb Konley (with Andrea and SoCal Val) defeated Tommaso Ciampa	Singles match	16:02
3	Sami Callihan defeated Zack Sabre Jr.	Singles match	20:28
4	Matt Riddle defeated Tracy Williams by submission	Style Battle 2016 Tournament final match	14:06
5	Team Tremendous (Bill Carr and Dan Barry) defeated The Bravado Brothers (Harlem Bravado & Lancelot Bravado), Catch Point (Drew Gulak and T. J. Perkins) and Roppongi Vice (Beretta and Rocky Romero)	Four-way tag team elimination match to determine the #1 contenders for the Evolve Tag Team Championship at the second chance tag team tournament final	21:56
6	Drew Galloway and Johnny Gargano defeated Heroes Eventually Die (Chris Hero and Tommy End) by submission	Tag team match to crown the first Evolve Tag Team Champions	25:48

== Evolve 56 ==
Evolve 56
- Promotion: Evolve Wrestling
- Date: March 19, 2016
- City: New York City, New York
- Venue: La Boom

No.	Results	Stipulations	Times
1	T. J. Perkins defeated Sami Callihan	Singles match	16:45
2	Ethan Page defeated Jack Gallow	Singles match	4:18
3	Drew Gulak defeated Fred Yehi by submission	Singles match	15:10
4	Chris Hero defeated Tracy Williams	Singles match	22:00
5	The Premier Athlete Brand (Anthony Nese and Caleb Konley) defeated Team Tremendous (Bill Carr and Dan Barry)	Tag team match	9:39
6	Zack Sabre Jr. defeated Johnny Gargano by submission	Singles match	22:45
7	Timothy Thatcher (c) defeated Matt Riddle	Singles match for the Evolve Championship	8:45
(c) / – the champion(s) heading into the match

== Evolve 57 ==
Evolve 57
- Promotion: Evolve Wrestling
- Date: March 20, 2016
- City: New York City, New York
- Venue: Floyd Bennett American Legion Post #1060

No.	Results	Stipulations	Times
1	Ethan Page defeated Fred Yehi	Singles match	5:12
2	T. J. Perkins defeated Tommaso Ciampa by submission	Singles match	14:30
3	Matt Riddle defeated Chris Hero by submission	Singles match	15:30
4	Timothy Thatcher (c) defeated Caleb Konley by submission	Singles match for the Evolve Championship	25:05
5	Sami Callihan defeated Tracy Williams	Singles match	19:59
6	Zack Sabre Jr. defeated Drew Gulak by submission	Singles match	27:12
7	Drew Galloway and Johnny Gargano (c) defeated Team Tremendous (Bill Carr and Dan Barry)	Tag team match for the Evolve Tag Team Championship	16:47
(c) / – the champion(s) heading into the match

== Evolve 58 ==
Evolve 58
- Promotion: Evolve Wrestling
- Date: April 1, 2016
- City: Dallas, Texas
- Venue: Eddie Deen's Ranch

No.	Results	Stipulations	Times
1	Drew Galloway and Johnny Gargano (c) (with Kota Ibushi) defeated The Premier Athlete Brand (Anthony Nese and Caleb Konley) (with Andrea and SoCal Val)	Tag team match for the Evolve Tag Team Championship	12:11
2	Timothy Thatcher (c) vs. Matt Riddle ended in no-contest	Singles match for the Evolve Championship	15:49
3	Marty Scurll defeated Fred Yehi by submission	Singles match	9:59
4	Sami Callihan defeated Ethan Page	Singles match	10:40
5	T. J. Perkins defeated Ricochet by submission	Singles match	14:32
6	Zack Sabre Jr. defeated Will Ospreay by submission	Singles match	16:32
7	Catch Point (Drew Gulak and Tracy Williams) (with T. J. Perkins) defeated Heroes Eventually Die (Chris Hero and Tommy End) by submission	Tag team match	27:44
(c) / – the champion(s) heading into the match

== Evolve 59 ==
Evolve 59
- Promotion: Evolve Wrestling
- Date: April 2, 2016
- City: Dallas, Texas
- Venue: Eddie Deen's Ranch

No.	Results	Stipulations	Times
1	Catch Point (Drew Gulak and Tracy Williams) defeated Drew Galloway and Johnny Gargano (c) by submission	Tag team match for the Evolve Tag Team Championship	19:35
2	Chris Hero defeated Fred Yehi	Singles match	16:44
3	Sami Callihan defeated Anthony Nese (with Andrea and SoCal Val) by submission	Singles match	4:39
4	Ethan Page defeated Darby Allin	Singles match	2:05
5	Tommy End defeated TJP (with Stokely Hathaway)	Singles match	12:00
6	Matt Riddle defeated Zack Sabre Jr. by submission	Singles match	9:24
7	Marty Scurll defeated Timothy Thatcher by submission	Singles match	9:36
8	Ricochet defeated Will Ospreay	Singles match	18:31
(c) / – the champion(s) heading into the match

== Evolve 60 ==
Evolve 60
- Promotion: Evolve Wrestling
- Date: May 6, 2016
- City: Joppa, Maryland
- Venue: MCW Arena

No.	Results	Stipulations	Times
1	Lio Rush defeated Caleb Konley	Singles match	10:21
2	The Bravado Brothers (Harlem Bravado and Lancelot Bravado) defeated The Devastation Corporation (Blaster McMassive and Flex Rumblecrunch)	Tag team match	8:22
3	Matt Riddle defeated Anthony Nese by submission	Singles match	11:35
4	Johnny Gargano defeated Marty Scurll by submission	Singles match	20:21
5	Drew Galloway defeated Ethan Page	Singles match	10:16
6	Catch Point (Drew Gulak and Tracy Williams) (c) defeated Catch Point (Fred Yehi and TJP) (with Stokely Hathaway) by submission	Tag team match for the Evolve Tag Team Championship	17:12
7	Chris Hero defeated Zack Sabre Jr.	Singles match	29:07
(c) / – the champion(s) heading into the match

== Evolve 61 ==
Evolve 61
- Promotion: Evolve Wrestling
- Date: May 7, 2016
- City: Woodside, New York
- Venue: La Boom

No.	Results	Stipulations	Times
1	Matt Riddle defeated Lio Rush by submission	Singles match	4:58
2	The Bravado Brothers (Harlem Bravado and Lancelot Bravado) defeated Chris Dickinson and Ethan Page	Tag team match	8:39
3	TJP (with Stokely Hathaway) defeated Fred Yehi	Cruiserweight Classic US Qualifying match	13:49
4	Drew Gulak defeated Tracy Williams by submission	Cruiserweight Classic US Qualifying match	17:54
5	Marty Scurll defeated Zack Sabre Jr. by submission	Singles match	23:18
6	Johnny Gargano defeated Drew Galloway by disqualification	Singles match	16:07

== Evolve 62 ==
Evolve 62
- Promotion: Evolve Wrestling
- Date: June 10, 2016
- City: Ybor City, Florida
- Venue: The Orpheum

No.	Results	Stipulations	Times
1^{D}	Joe Coffey won a gauntlet match (Note: Eric Locker participated in the gauntlet match, while the rest of the participants's identity is unknown)	Gauntlet match	—
2^{D}	Rory Gulak defeated an unknown male wrestler (Note: The identity of Gulak's opponent is unknown)	Singles match	—
3	Fred Yehi defeated Anthony Nese by submission	Singles match	16:00
4	Ethan Page defeated Darby Allin	Singles match	9:20
5	Matt Riddle defeated Cedric Alexander by submission	Singles match	10:35
6	Catch Point (Drew Gulak and Tracy Williams) (c) (with Fred Yehi and TJP) defeated The Bravado Brothers (Harlem Bravado and Lancelot Bravado)	Tag team match for the Evolve Tag Team Championship	27:29
7	Timothy Thatcher (c) defeated Chris Hero by submission	Singles match for the Evolve Championship	22:52
8	Drew Galloway and Ethan Carter III defeated Johnny Gargano and TJP (with Stokely Hathaway)	Tag team Street Fight match	20:37
(c) / – the champion(s) heading into the match; D / – this was a dark match

== Evolve 63 ==
Evolve 63
- Promotion: Evolve Wrestling
- Date: June 11, 2016
- City: Orlando, Florida
- Venue: Orlando Downtown Recreation Complex

No.	Results	Stipulations	Times
1^{D}	Joe Coffey defeated Rory Gulak	Singles match	—
2	Cedric Alexander defeated Fred Yehi	Singles match	12:03
3	The Bravado Brothers (Harlem Bravado and Lancelot Bravado) defeated Darby Allin and Jason Cade	Tag team match	11:14
4	Matt Riddle defeated Trevor Lee by submission	Singles match	10:02
5	Timothy Thatcher (c) defeated Tracy Williams by submission	Singles match for the Evolve Championship	17:02
6	Tony Nese defeated Drew Gulak, Johnny Gargano, Lince Dorado and TJP	Cruiserweight Classic Flashpoint match	20:10
7	Drew Galloway defeated Ethan Page	"Anything goes" match	14:53
8	Johnny Gargano (with Drew Gulak and TJP) defeated Ethan Carter III (with Drew Galloway)	Last man standing match	13:30
(c) / – the champion(s) heading into the match; D / – this was a dark match

=== Cruiserweight Classic Flashpoint match ===
Eliminated	Wrestler	Eliminated by	Method of elimination	Time
1	Johnny Gargano	Drew Gulak	Pinned with a sunset flip	6:59
2	Lince Dorado	TJP	Submitted to the TJ Clutch	9:22
3	Drew Gulak	TJP	Pinned after a double chickenwing gutbuster	13:04
4	TJP	Tony Nese	Pinned after a 450° splash	20:10
Winner	Tony Nese			20:10

== Evolve 64 ==
Evolve 64
- Promotion: Evolve Wrestling
- Date: July 16, 2016
- City: New York City, New York
- Venue: La Boom

No.	Results	Stipulations	Times
1	Johnny Gargano defeated Cedric Alexander by submission	Singles match	11:56
2	Tony Nese defeated Chris Dickinson, Darby Allin and Fred Yehi	Four-way freestyle match	8:30
3	Ethan Page defeated Wheeler YUTA	Singles match	2:43
4	Zack Sabre Jr. defeated Jigsaw	Singles match	17:58
5	Matt Riddle defeated Roderick Strong by submission	Singles match	18:08
6	Timothy Thatcher (c) defeated Marty Scurll by technical submission	Singles match for the Evolve Championship	15:02
7	Drew Galloway and Dustin defeated Catch Point (Drew Gulak and Tracy Williams) (c)	Tag team match for the Evolve Tag Team Championship	18:22
(c) / – the champion(s) heading into the match

== Evolve 65 ==
Evolve 65
- Promotion: Evolve Wrestling
- Date: July 17, 2016
- City: Melrose, Massachusetts
- Venue: Melrose Memorial Hall
- Attendance: ca. 400

No.	Results	Stipulations	Times
1	Cedric Alexander defeated Tommaso Ciampa	Cruiserweight Classic Spotlight match	18:06
2	Ethan Page defeated Travis Gordon	Singles match	2:37
3	Matt Riddle defeated Marty Scurll by submission	Singles match	10:22
4	Catch Point (Drew Gulak, Fred Yehi and Tracy Williams) (with TJP) defeated Chris Dickinson, Darby Allin and Jonathan Gresham by submission	Six-man tag team match	16:59
5	Timothy Thatcher (c) defeated TJP (with Drew Gulak, Fred Yehi and Stokely Hathaway)	Singles match for the Evolve Championship	11:38
6	Zack Sabre Jr. defeated Tony Nese	Cruiserweight Classic Spotlight match	14:58
7	Drew Galloway defeated Johnny Gargano	"The Final Showdown"	17:27
(c) / – the champion(s) heading into the match

== Evolve 66 ==
Evolve 66
- Promotion: Evolve Wrestling
- Date: August 19, 2016
- City: Joppa, Maryland
- Venue: MCW Arena

No.	Results	Stipulations	Times
1	TJP (with Stokely Hathaway) defeated Cedric Alexander by submission	Cruiserweight Classic Spotlight match	15:24
2	Jigsaw and Peter Kaasa defeated Catch Point (Fred Yehi and Tracy Williams)	Tag team match	13:55
3	Ethan Page defeated Dustin	Singles match	11:29
4	Drew Gulak defeated Tony Nese	Cruiserweight Classic Spotlight match	18:12
5	Timothy Thatcher (c) defeated Matt Riddle by submission	No Holds Barred match for the Evolve Championship	16:46
6	Cody Rhodes defeated Zack Sabre Jr. by submission	Singles match	18:10
(c) / – the champion(s) heading into the match

== Evolve 67 ==
Evolve 67
- Promotion: Evolve Wrestling
- Date: August 20, 2016
- City: New York City, New York
- Venue: Saint Finbar Catholic Church Gymnasium

No.	Results	Stipulations	Times
1	Ethan Page defeated Kobe Durst	Singles match	2:54
2	Tony Nese defeated Peter Kaasa	Singles match	12:29
3	Matt Riddle defeated Tommy End by submission	Singles match	12:29
4	Zack Sabre Jr. defeated Cedric Alexander by submission	Cruiserweight Classic Spotlight match	15:44
5	Chris Hero defeated Cody Rhodes	Singles match	20:15
6	Timothy Thatcher (c) defeated Drew Gulak	Singles match for the Evolve Championship	21:13
7	Drew Galloway, Dustin and Ethan Carter III (c) defeated Catch Point (Fred Yehi and TJP) and Ethan Page (with Stokely Hathaway)	No Disqualification Six-man tag team match	10:07
(c) / – the champion(s) heading into the match

== Evolve 68 ==
Evolve 68
- Promotion: Evolve Wrestling
- Date: September 10, 2016
- City: Long Island, New York
- Venue: NYWC Sportatorium

No.	Results	Stipulations	Times
1	Fred Yehi defeated Jigsaw by submission	Singles match	10:40
2	Ethan Page defeated Dan Barry	Singles match	8:14
3	T. J. Perkins (with Stokely Hathaway) defeated Darby Allin by submission	Singles match	8:06
4	Tracy Williams defeated Dustin by disqualification	Singles match	0:49
5	Tracy Williams defeated Dustin by submission	Extreme Rules match	8:54
6	Tony Nese defeated Matt Riddle and Ricochet	Three-way match	9:16
7	Drew Galloway defeated Drew Gulak	Singles match	16:18
8	Zack Sabre Jr. defeated Johnny Gargano by submission	Singles match	23:59

== Evolve 69: A Farewell To An Icon ==
Evolve 69: A Farewell To An Icon
- Promotion: Evolve Wrestling
- Date: September 11, 2016
- City: New York City, New York
- Venue: La Boom

No.	Results	Stipulations	Times
1	Darby Allin defeated Tony Nese	Singles match	8:20
2	Fred Yehi defeated Travis Gordon by submission	Singles match	5:44
3	Tracy Williams defeated Chuck O'Neil by submission	Singles match	9:00
4	Dustin defeated Drew Gulak	Grudge match	10:33
5	Ethan Page defeated David Starr	Singles match	10:23
6	Matt Riddle defeated T. J. Perkins (with Stokely Hathaway) by submission	Singles match	13:21
7	Ricochet defeated Zack Sabre Jr.	Singles match	22:26
8	Cody and Johnny Gargano defeated Chris Hero and Drew Galloway (with Dustin) by submission	Tag team match	20:18

== Evolve 70 ==
Evolve 70
- Promotion: Evolve Wrestling
- Date: October 15, 2016
- City: Orlando, Florida
- Venue: Dr. Smith Neighborhood Center

No.	Results	Stipulations	Times
1	Darby Allin defeated Anthony Henry	Singles match	8:09
2	Nathan Cruz defeated Jason Kincaid by submission	Singles match	11:18
3	Fred Yehi defeated Dustin by submission	Singles match	11:29
4	The Gatekeepers (Blaster McMassive and Flex Rumblecrunch) (with Ethan Page) defeated CT Brown and Rex Bacchus	Tag team match	1:49
5	Timothy Thatcher (c) defeated Ethan Page (with Blaster McMassive and Flex Rumblecrunch) by submission	Singles match for the Evolve Championship	18:49
6	Zack Sabre Jr. defeated Tracy Williams (with Fred Yehi) by submission	Singles match	26:48
7	Chris Hero defeated Drew Gulak	Singles match	22:14
8	Matt Riddle defeated A. R. Fox (with Drew Galloway) by submission	Singles match	9:55
(c) / – the champion(s) heading into the match

== Evolve 71 ==
Evolve 71
- Promotion: Evolve Wrestling
- Date: October 16, 2016
- City: Ybor City, Florida
- Venue: The Orpheum

No.	Results	Stipulations	Times
1^{D}	Bad Bones defeated Billy Barboza	Singles match	—
2	Drew Gulak defeated Timothy Thatcher by submission	"Fight To The Finish" match	13:59
3	Tracy Williams defeated Jason Kincaid	Singles match	18:12
4	The Gatekeepers (Blaster McMassive and Flex Rumblecrunch) (with Ethan Page) defeated Eric Locker and Joe Coleman	Tag team match	0:57
5	Ethan Page (with Blaster McMassive and Flex Rumblecrunch) defeated Sami Callihan	Singles match	13:37
6	Dustin defeated Darby Allin	Singles match	11:00
7	Zack Sabre Jr. defeated Fred Yehi by submission	Singles match	20:56
8	Chris Hero defeated Matt Riddle	Singles match	17:28
D / – this was a dark match

== Evolve 72 ==
Evolve 72
- Promotion: Evolve Wrestling
- Date: November 12, 2016
- City: New York City, New York
- Venue: La Boom

No.	Results	Stipulations	Times
1^{D}	Tony Nese defeated Tommy End	Singles match	—
2	Matt Riddle defeated Dustin	Singles match	8:57
3	Fred Yehi defeated Jason Kincaid by submission	Singles match	7:39
4	Jaka and Chris Dickinson defeated Darby Allin and Tony Nese	Tag team match	7:24
5	Ethan Page (with Blaster McMassive and Flex Rumblecrunch) defeated Zack Sabre Jr.	Singles match	10:51
6	Tracy Williams defeated Chris Hero by submission	Singles match	12:35
7	Timothy Thatcher (with Stokely Hathaway) (c) defeated Drew Gulak	"Squared Circle of Survival" match for the Evolve Championship	29:29
(c) / – the champion(s) heading into the match; D / – this was a dark match

== Evolve 73 ==
Evolve 73
- Promotion: Evolve Wrestling
- Date: November 13, 2016
- City: Joppa, Maryland
- Venue: MCW Arena

No.	Results	Stipulations	Times
1^{D}	Tommy End defeated Tony Nese	Singles match	—
2	Jaka defeated Darby Allin	Singles match	6:16
3	Jason Kincaid defeated Icarus	Singles match	5:07
4	Ethan Page (with Blaster McMassive and Flex Rumblecrunch) defeated Chris Dickinson (with Jaka)	Singles match	12:32
5	Drew Gulak defeated Zack Sabre Jr. by submission	Singles match	25:19
6	Chris Hero defeated Matt Riddle	Singles match	10:29
7	Catch Point (Fred Yehi and Tracy Williams) defeated Chris Hero (Note: Chris Hero replaced Drew Galloway in this match) and Dustin (with Drew Galloway) (c), Drew Gulak and Tony Nese and The Gatekeepers (Blaster McMassive and Flex Rumblecrunch) (with Ethan Page) by submission	Four-way tag team elimination match for the Evolve Tag Team Championship	24:33
(c) / – the champion(s) heading into the match; D / – this was a dark match

Elimination match

Eliminated	Team	Eliminated by	Method of elimination	Time
1	The Gatekeepers	Chris Hero and Dustin	Rumblecrunch was pinned by Dustin	10:50
2	Chris Hero and Dustin	Catch Point	Dustin was submitted by Williams	20:13
3	Drew Gulak and Tony Nese	Catch Point	Nese was submitted by Yehi	24:33
Winners	Catch Point	—N/a		24:33

== Evolve 74 ==
Evolve 74
- Promotion: Evolve Wrestling
- Date: December 10, 2016
- City: New York City, New York
- Venue: La Boom

No.	Results	Stipulations	Times
1	Drew Gulak defeated Jaka by submission	Singles match	16:54
2	Dustin defeated Chris Dickinson	Singles match	10:52
3	Brian Cage defeated Darby Allin by countout	Singles match	8:40
4	Cody defeated Ethan Page (with Blaster McMassive)	Singles match	14:12
5	Jeff Cobb defeated Matt Riddle	Singles match	9:05
6	Catch Point (Fred Yehi and Tracy Williams) (c) defeated Peter Kaasa and Ricochet by submission	Tag team match for the Evolve Tag Team Championship	25:19
7	Dick Togo defeated Chris Hero	Singles match	19:05
(c) / – the champion(s) heading into the match

== Evolve 75 ==
Evolve 75
- Promotion: Evolve Wrestling
- Date: December 11, 2016
- City: Melrose, Massachusetts
- Venue: Melrose Memorial Hall

No.	Results	Stipulations	Times
1	Jeff Cobb defeated Fred Yehi (with Tracy Williams)	Singles match	9:46
2	(Jaka and Chris Dickinson) defeated Darby Allin and Peter Kaasa	Tag team match	9:32
3	Ethan Page (with Blaster McMassive) defeated Dick Togo	Singles match	11:33
4	Chris Hero defeated Dustin	Singles match	11:46
5	Matt Riddle defeated Ricochet by submission	Singles match	8:44
6	Tracy Williams (with Fred Yehi and Matt Riddle) defeated Drew Gulak by submission	Singles match	37:00

== Evolve 76: A Hero's Exit - Part 1 ==
Evolve 76: A Hero's Exit - Part 1
- Promotion: Evolve Wrestling
- Date: January 27, 2017
- City: San Antonio, Texas
- Venue: Woodlawn Lake Park Gym

No.	Results	Stipulations	Times
1^{D}	Action Jackson defeated DJ Talamantez	Singles match	5:48
2^{D}	Rudy Russo defeated Max Castillano	Singles match	6:46
3^{D}	Moonshine Mantell defeated Texas Lion	Singles match	7:42
4	Jaka (with Chris Dickinson, Fred Yehi, Matt Riddle and Tracy Williams) defeated Peter Kaasa	Singles match	9:07
5	Darby Allin defeated Chris Dickinson	Singles match	6:17
6	Jason Kincaid defeated Dustin by submission	Singles match	10:54
7	Ethan Page (with Blaster McMassive and Flex Rumblecrunch) defeated Zack Sabre Jr. by disqualification	Grudge match	12:55
8	Matt Riddle defeated A. C. H.	Singles match	13:48
9	Catch Point (Fred Yehi and Tracy Williams) (c) defeated Jeff Cobb and Timothy Thatcher (with Stokely Hathaway) by submission	Tag team match for the Evolve Tag Team Championship	15:42
10	Chris Hero defeated Keith Lee	Singles match	21:45
(c) / – the champion(s) heading into the match; D / – this was a dark match

== Evolve 77: A Hero's Exit - Part 2 ==
Evolve 77: A Hero's Exit - Part 2
- Promotion: Evolve Wrestling
- Date: January 28, 2017
- City: San Antonio, Texas
- Venue: Woodlawn Lake Park Gym

No.	Results	Stipulations	Times
1	Barrett Brown, Darby Allin and Zack Sabre Jr. defeated Ethan Page and The Gatekeepers (Blaster McMassive and Flex Rumblecrunch)	Six-man tag team match	11:58
2	Tracy Williams defeated Laredo Kid by submission	Singles match	7:58
3	Catch Point (Jaka and Chris Dickinson) defeated Jason Kincaid and Sammy Guevara	Tag team match	13:37
4	A. C. H. defeated Fred Yehi	Singles match	14:08
5	Matt Riddle defeated Dustin	No Disqualification match	10:40
6	Timothy Thatcher (c) (with Stokely Hathaway) defeated Jeff Cobb	Singles match for the Evolve Championship	16:08
7	Zack Sabre Jr. defeated Chris Hero by submission	Singles match	22:59
(c) / – the champion(s) heading into the match

== Evolve 78 ==
Evolve 78
- Promotion: Evolve Wrestling
- Date: February 24, 2017
- City: Joppa, Maryland
- Venue: MCW Arena

No.	Results	Stipulations	Times
1	Matt Riddle defeated Anthony Henry by submission	Singles match	10:32
2	Austin Theory defeated Darby Allin	Singles match	5:18
3	Ethan Page (with Blaster McMassive and Flex Rumblecrunch) defeated Jason Kincaid	Singles match	10:37
4	Catch Point (Jaka and Chris Dickinson) defeated The Gatekeepers (Blaster McMassive and Flex Rumblecrunch)	Tag team match	9:24
5	A. C. H. defeated Tracy Williams	Singles match	18:14
6	Drew Galloway defeated Jeff Cobb	Singles match	12:03
7	Keith Lee defeated Zack Sabre Jr.	Singles match	12:20
8	Timothy Thatcher (c) (with Stokely Hathaway) defeated Fred Yehi (with Chris Dickinson, Jaka and Tracy Williams) by submission	Singles match for the Evolve Championship	18:50
(c) / – the champion(s) heading into the match

== Evolve 79 ==
Evolve 79
- Promotion: Evolve Wrestling
- Date: February 25, 2017
- City: New York City, New York
- Venue: La Boom

No.	Results	Stipulations	Times
1	A. C. H. defeated Jason Kincaid	Singles match	7:11
2	Chris Dickinson defeated Anthony Henry, Austin Theory and Fred Yehi	Four-way freestyle match	8:17
3	Jeff Cobb defeated Jaka	Singles match	8:50
4	Keith Lee defeated Tracy Williams	Singles match	11:34
5	Ethan Page (with Blaster McMassive and Flex Rumblecrunch) defeated Darby Allin	Singles match	8:50
6	Matt Riddle defeated Drew Galloway by referee stoppage	Singles match	12:05
7	Zack Sabre Jr. defeated Timothy Thatcher (c) (with Stokely Hathaway) by submission	Singles match for the Evolve Championship	18:49
(c) / – the champion(s) heading into the match

== Evolve 80 ==
Evolve 80
- Promotion: Evolve Wrestling
- Date: March 30, 2017
- City: Fern Park, Florida
- Venue: Orlando Live Events

No.	Results	Stipulations	Times
1	Drew Galloway defeated Matt Riddle	Grudge match	7:16
2	Timothy Thatcher (with Stokely Hathaway) defeated Chris Dickinson by submission	Singles match	9:20
3	Lio Rush defeated Jaka and Jason Kincaid	Three-way match	9:10
4	The Gatekeepers (Blaster McMassive and Flex Rumblecrunch) (with Ethan Page) defeated Facade and Michael Richard Blais	Tag team match	2:05
5	Ethan Page (with Blaster McMassive and Flex Rumblecrunch) defeated Austin Theory	Singles match	7:19
6	Ricochet defeated Keith Lee	Singles match	17:14
7	Catch Point (Fred Yehi and Tracy Williams) (c) defeated Donovan Dijak and Michael Elgin by submission	Tag team match for the Evolve Tag Team Championship	18:26
8	Zack Sabre Jr. (c) defeated A. C. H. by submission	Singles match for the Evolve Championship	14:17
(c) / – the champion(s) heading into the match

== Evolve 81 ==
Evolve 81
- Promotion: Evolve Wrestling
- Date: March 31, 2017
- City: Fern Park, Florida
- Venue: Orlando Downtown Recreation Complex

No.	Results	Stipulations	Times
1	Zack Sabre Jr. defeated Michael Elgin	Singles match	17:38
2	Drew Galloway defeated Lio Rush	Singles match	9:24
3	Keith Lee defeated Donovan Dijak	Singles match	12:10
4	A. C. H. defeated Timothy Thatcher (with Stokely Hathaway)	Singles match	9:08
5	Catch Point (Tracy Williams, Jaka and Chris Dickinson) defeated Austin Theory, Jason Kincaid and Sammy Guevara	Six-man tag team match	17:18
6	Fred Yehi defeated Matt Riddle by technical submission	Singles match	17:19
7	Darby Allin defeated Ethan Page (with Blaster McMassive and Flex Rumblecrunch)	"Anything goes" match	20:09

== Evolve 82 ==
Evolve 82
- Promotion: Evolve Wrestling
- Date: April 22, 2017
- City: New York City, New York
- Venue: La Boom

No.	Results	Stipulations	Times
1	Matt Riddle (c) defeated Timothy Thatcher (with Stokely Hathaway) by submission	Singles match for the WWN Championship	10:15
2	A. C. H. defeated Austin Theory	Singles match	13:50
3	Drew Galloway vs. Zack Sabre Jr. ended in no-contest	Singles match	6:40
4	Kyle O'Reilly defeated Keith Lee	Singles match	20:00
5	Catch Point (Jaka and Chris Dickinson) defeated Catch Point (Fred Yehi and Tracy Williams) (c)	Tag team match for the Evolve Tag Team Championship	15:25
6	Ethan Page defeated Darby Allin	Last Man Standing match	18:55
(c) / – the champion(s) heading into the match

== Evolve 83 ==
Evolve 83
- Promotion: Evolve Wrestling
- Date: April 23, 2017
- City: New York City, New York
- Venue: Saint Finbar Catholic Church Gymnasium

No.	Results	Stipulations	Times
1	Ethan Page (with Blaster McMassive) defeated Austin Theory	Singles match	7:50
2	Tracy Williams defeated Chris Dickinson by submission	Singles match	10:55
3	Jaka defeated A. C. H.	Singles match	13:25
4	Keith Lee defeated David Starr	Singles match	8:50
5	Kyle O'Reilly defeated Fred Yehi by submission	Singles match	20:45
6	Zack Sabre Jr. (c) defeated Lio Rush	Singles match for the Evolve Championship	19:25
7	Matt Riddle (c) defeated Drew Galloway	"I Quit" match for the WWN Championship	17:55
(c) / – the champion(s) heading into the match

== Evolve 84 ==
Evolve 84
- Promotion: Evolve Wrestling
- Date: May 20, 2017
- City: Summit, Illinois
- Venue: Summit Park District

No.	Results	Stipulations	Times
1	Keith Lee defeated Donovan Dijak	Singles match	18:55
2	Fred Yehi defeated Jason Kincaid by submission	Singles match	14:58
3	Lio Rush defeated Austin Theory	Singles match	9:05
4	Tracy Williams (with Stokely Hathaway) defeated Jeff Cobb	Singles match	9:52
5	Catch Point (Jaka and Chris Dickinson) (with Stokely Hathaway) (c) defeated Isaias Velazquez and Matt Knicks	Tag team match for the Evolve Tag Team Championship	10:15
6	Zack Sabre Jr. (c) defeated Ethan Page	Singles match for the Evolve Championship	14:10
7	Matt Riddle (c) defeated Kyle O'Reilly by submission	Singles match for the WWN Championship	16:18
(c) / – the champion(s) heading into the match

== Evolve 85 ==
Evolve 85
- Promotion: Evolve Wrestling
- Date: May 21, 2017
- City: Livonia, Michigan
- Venue: Knights Of Columbus Hall

No.	Results	Stipulations	Times
1	Dominic Garrini defeated Alex Daniels by referee stoppage	Singles match	3:36
2	Catch Point (Jaka and Chris Dickinson) (c) (with Stokely Hathaway and Tracy Williams) defeated Austin Theory and Jason Kincaid	Tag team match for the Evolve Tag Team Championship	16:25
3	Allysin Kay defeated Priscilla Kelly	Shine showcase match	5:01
4	Ethan Page defeated Donovan Dijak	Singles match	5:01
5	Tracy Williams defeated Kyle O'Reilly by submission	Singles match	18:22
6	Keith Lee defeated Fred Yehi	Singles match	18:10
7	Matt Riddle (c) defeated Jeff Cobb by submission	Singles match for the WWN Championship	6:21
8	Zack Sabre Jr. (c) defeated Lio Rush by submission	Singles match for the Evolve Championship	19:19
(c) / – the champion(s) heading into the match

== Evolve 86 ==
Evolve 86
- Promotion: Evolve Wrestling
- Date: June 24, 2017
- City: Melrose, Massachusetts
- Venue: Melrose Memorial Hall

No.	Results	Stipulations	Times
1	Timothy Thatcher (with Stokely Hathaway) defeated Austin Theory by technical submission	Singles match	10:25
2	A. C. H. defeated Chris Dickinson	Singles match	14:23
3	Thomas Sharp defeated Nick Comoroto	Singles match	2:00
4	Fred Yehi defeated Jaka by submission	Singles match	16:17
5	Tracy Williams defeated Jason Kincaid by submission	Singles match	13:55
6	Keith Lee defeated Ethan Page	Singles match	10:46
7	Zack Sabre Jr. defeated Matt Riddle by submission	Singles match	12:30

== Evolve 87 ==
Evolve 87
- Promotion: Evolve Wrestling
- Date: June 25, 2017
- City: New York City, New York
- Venue: La Boom

No.	Results	Stipulations	Times
1	Tracy Williams defeated A. C. H. by submission	Singles match	14:35
2	Timothy Thatcher (with Stokely Hathaway) defeated Jason Kincaid by submission	Singles match	12:45
3	Fred Yehi defeated Chris Dickinson (with Jaka) by submission	Singles match	16:28
4	Zack Sabre Jr. (c) defeated Jaka	Singles match for the Evolve Championship	15:00
5	Ethan Page defeated Thomas Sharp	Singles match	5:35
6	Trent Barreta defeated Austin Theory	Singles match	14:50
7	Matt Riddle (c) defeated Keith Lee	Singles match for the WWN Championship	14:56
(c) / – the champion(s) heading into the match

== Evolve 88 ==
Evolve 88
- Promotion: Evolve Wrestling
- Date: July 8, 2017
- City: Charlotte, North Carolina
- Venue: UptownLive

No.	Results	Stipulations	Times
1	Jason Kincaid defeated Caleb Konley by submission	Singles match	14:30
2	Austin Theory (with Priscilla Kelly) defeated Ethan Case	Singles match	6:40
3	Keith Lee defeated Ethan Page	Singles match	9:45
4	Tracy Williams defeated Darby Allin by submission	Singles match	13:22
5	Fred Yehi defeated A. C. H. by submission	Singles match	16:45
6	Anthony Henry and JD Drake defeated Catch Point (Jaka and Chris Dickinson) (c)	Tag team match for the Evolve Tag Team Championship	19:50
7	Zack Sabre Jr. (c) defeated Timothy Thatcher (with Stokely Hathaway) by submission	No Holds Barred match for the Evolve Championship	18:00
(c) / – the champion(s) heading into the match

== Evolve 89 ==
Evolve 89
- Promotion: Evolve Wrestling
- Date: July 9, 2017
- City: Marietta, Georgia
- Venue: Marietta Event Hall

No.	Results	Stipulations	Times
1	Timothy Thatcher (with Stokely Hathaway) defeated Darby Allin	Singles match	8:26
2	A. C. H. defeated Ethan Page	Singles match	8:01
3	Jason Kincaid defeated Jon Davis	Singles match	15:32
4	Keith Lee vs. Tracy Williams (with Stokely Hathaway) ended in no-contest	Singles match	8:00
5	Anthony Henry and JD Drake (c) defeated Catch Point (Jaka and Chris Dickinson) (with Stokely Hathaway) and The Ugly Ducklings (Lance Lude and Rob Killjoy)	Three-way tag team match for the Evolve Tag Team Championship	8:14
6	Austin Theory (with Priscilla Kelly) defeated Trent Barreta	Singles match	16:06
7	Zack Sabre Jr. (c) defeated Fred Yehi	Singles match for the Evolve Championship	23:06
(c) / – the champion(s) heading into the match

== Evolve 90 ==
Evolve 90
- Promotion: Evolve Wrestling
- Date: August 11, 2017
- City: Joppa, Maryland
- Venue: MCW Arena

No.	Results	Stipulations	Times
1	A. C. H. and Ethan Page defeated Catch Point (Jaka and Chris Dickinson)	Tag team match	15:20
2	Darby Allin defeated Craig Mitchell	Singles match	4:47
3	Austin Theory (with Priscilla Kelly) defeated Jason Kincaid	Singles match	12:18
4	Anthony Henry and JD Drake (c) defeated Rory Gulak and Tracy Williams	Tag team match for the Evolve Tag Team Championship	19:05
5	Keith Lee defeated Timothy Thatcher (with Stokely Hathaway)	Singles match	10:55
6	Walter (c) defeated Fred Yehi by technical submission	Singles match for the Progress Atlas Championship	15:08
7	Matt Riddle defeated Lio Rush by submission	Singles match	11:00
(c) / – the champion(s) heading into the match

== Evolve 91 ==
Evolve 91
- Promotion: Evolve Wrestling
- Date: August 12, 2017
- City: New York City, New York
- Venue: Elmcor Center

No.	Results	Stipulations	Times
1	Ethan Page defeated A. C. H.	Singles match	9:38
2	Darby Allin defeated Timothy Thatcher (with Stokely Hathaway)	Singles match	10:45
3	Anthony Henry and JD Drake (c) defeated Fred Yehi and Jason Kincaid	Tag team match for the Evolve Tag Team Championship	11:27
4	Mark Haskins defeated Austin Theory (with Priscilla Kelly) by submission	Singles match	15:53
5	Catch Point(Jaka and Chris Dickinson) defeated The South Pacific Power Trip (TK Cooper and Travis Banks) (with Dahlia Black)	Tag team match	13:37
6	Matt Riddle (c) defeated Keith Lee, Tracy Williams and Walter by submission	Four-way match for the WWN Championship	15:52
(c) / – the champion(s) heading into the match

== Evolve 92 ==
Evolve 92
- Promotion: Evolve Wrestling
- Date: September 22, 2017
- City: Detroit, Michigan
- Venue: Knights Of Columbus Hall

No.	Results	Stipulations
1	Zack Sabre Jr. defeated Jason Kincaid by submission	Singles match
2	Austin Theory (with Priscilla Kelly) defeated Stephen Wolf	Singles match
3	Tracy Williams (with Stokely Hathaway) defeated Darby Allin	Singles match
4	Fred Yehi defeated DJ Z by submission	Singles match
5	Doom Patrol (Jaka and Chris Dickinson) (with Stokely Hathaway and Tracy Williams) defeated Keith Lee and Matt Riddle	Tag team match
6	The Troll Boyz (A. C. H. and Ethan Page) defeated Anthony Henry and James Drake (c)	Tag team match for the Evolve Tag Team Championship
7^{D}	Cedric Alexander vs. Zack Sabre Jr. ended in no-contest	Singles match
8^{D}	Cedric Alexander and Zack Sabre Jr. defeated Doom Patrol (Chris Dickinson and Jaka) (with Stokely Hathaway)	Tag team match
(c) / – the champion(s) heading into the match; D / – this was a dark match

== Evolve 93 ==
Evolve 93
- Promotion: Evolve Wrestling
- Date: September 23, 2017
- City: Livonia, Michigan
- Venue: Knights of Columbus

No.	Results	Stipulations
1^{D}	Fred Yehi defeated Cedric Alexander by referee stoppage	Singles match
2	Fred Yehi defeated Cyrus Satin by referee stoppage	Singles match
3	Jason Kincaid defeated Anthony Henry by submission	Singles match
4	Austin Theory (with Priscilla Kelly) defeated JD Drake	Singles match
5	Stevie Fierce (c) defeated Bryce Benjamin, GPA and Matt Knicks	Freelance Wrestling Showcase Four-way match for the FW Championship
6	Darby Allin defeated DJ Z	Singles match
7	Doom Patrol (Jaka and Chris Dickinson) defeated The Troll Boyz (A. C. H. and Ethan Page) (c)	Tag team match for the Evolve Tag Team Championship
8	Zack Sabre Jr. (c) defeated Keith Lee	Singles match for the Evolve Championship
9	Matt Riddle (c) defeated Tracy Williams by submission	"Anything goes" match for the WWN Championship
(c) / – the champion(s) heading into the match; D / – this was a dark match

== Evolve 94 ==
Evolve 94
- Promotion: Evolve Wrestling
- Date: October 14, 2017
- City: New York City, New York
- Venue: La Boom

No.	Results	Stipulations	Times
1	Dominic Garrini defeated Rayo by submission	Singles match	—
2	Chris Dickinson defeated Jason Kincaid	Singles match	—
3	Austin Theory (with Priscilla Kelly) defeated Brandon Watts	Singles match	—
4	Darby Allin defeated Jarek 1-20	Singles match	—
5	Tracy Williams defeated Fred Yehi by submission	Singles match	—
6	Jaka defeated Zack Sabre Jr.	Singles match	—
7	Keith Lee defeated Matt Riddle (c)	Last man standing match for the WWN Championship	17:49
(c) / – the champion(s) heading into the match

== Evolve 95 ==
Evolve 95
- Promotion: Evolve Wrestling
- Date: October 15, 2017
- City: East Haven, Connecticut
- Venue: Joseph Melillo Middle School

No.	Results	Stipulations
1^{D}	Matias De Napoli defeated Nutrious X	Singles match
2^{D}	Sgt. Murray (c) defeated Zafar Al-Rajhi	Singles match for the PAPW United States Championship
3^{D}	Hakim Ali and Nick Payne (c) defeated Marcel Williams and Ty Shyne	Tag team match for the PAPW Tag Team Championship
4	Shane Mercer defeated Mikey Webb	Singles match
5	Jarek 1-20 defeated Brandon Watts	Singles match
6	Dominic Garrini defeated Cyrus Satin by submission	Singles match
7	Austin Theory (with Priscilla Kelly) defeated Jason Kincaid	Singles match
8	Keith Lee defeated Darby Allin	Singles match
9	Doom Patrol (Jaka and Chris Dickinson) (c) defeated The Gym Nasty Boyz (Timmy Lou Retton and White Mike) and The Ugly Ducklings (Lance Lude and Rob Killjoy)	Three-way tag team elimination match for the Evolve Tag Team Championship
10	Richard Holliday (c) defeated RJ Rude	Singles match for the PAPW Heavyweight Championship
11	Fred Yehi defeated Matt Riddle by technical submission	Singles match
12	Zack Sabre Jr. (c) defeated Tracy Williams	Singles match for the Evolve Championship
(c) / – the champion(s) heading into the match; D / – this was a dark match

Elimination match

Eliminated	Team	Eliminated by	Method of elimination	Time
1	The Gym Nasty Boyz	Doom Patrol	White Mike was pinned by Jaka	N/A
2	The Ugly Ducklings	Doom Patrol	Rob Killjoy was pinned by Doom Patrol	N/A
Winners	Doom Patrol	—N/a		N/A

== Evolve 96 ==
Evolve 96
- Promotion: Evolve Wrestling
- Date: December 9, 2017
- City: New York City, New York
- Venue: Elmcor Center

No.	Results	Stipulations	Times
1	Dominic Garrini defeated Joey Lynch by submission	Singles match	4:07
2	KTB and Shane Mercer defeated Matt Knicks and Stevie Fierce	Tag team match	4:30
3	Jarek 1-20 defeated Stephen Wolf	Singles match	7:30
4	Zack Sabre Jr. defeated DJ Z	Singles match	15:10
5	A. R. Fox defeated Jason Kincaid	Singles match	9:00
6	Darby Allin defeated Austin Theory (with Priscilla Kelly)	Singles match	12:08
7	Catch Point (Jaka and Tracy Williams) (c) (with Stokely Hathaway) vs. Anthony Henry and JD Drake ended in no-contest	Tag team match for the Evolve Tag Team Championship	10:35
8	Matt Riddle defeated Fred Yehi by submission	No rope breaks match	14:00
9	Keith Lee (c) defeated Walter	Singles match for the WWN Championship	19:13
(c) / – the champion(s) heading into the match

== Evolve 97 ==
Evolve 97
- Promotion: Evolve Wrestling
- Date: December 10, 2017
- City: Melrose, Massachusetts
- Venue: Melrose Memorial Hall

No.	Results	Stipulations	Times
1	Dominic Garrini defeated Craig Mitchell by submission	Singles match	1:20
2	Matt Knicks and Stevie Fierce defeated Brandon Watts and Stephen Wolf	Tag team match	8:15
3	Jarek 1-20 vs. Jason Kincaid ended in a time limit draw	Singles match	10:00
4	Anthony Henry and JD Drake defeated KTB and Shane Mercer	Singles match	10:10
5	A. R. Fox defeated DJ Z	Singles match	11:07
6	Darby Allin defeated Keith Lee and Tracy Williams (with Stokely Hathaway)	Three-way match to earn the right to any match of his choosing in 2018	10:15
7	Austin Theory (with Priscilla Kelly) defeated Fred Yehi (c)	Singles match for the FIP World Heavyweight Championship	16:06
8	Matt Riddle defeated Walter by referee stoppage	Singles match	10:00
9	Zack Sabre Jr. (c) defeated Jaka (with Stokely Hathaway) by submission	Singles match for the Evolve Championship	18:13
(c) / – the champion(s) heading into the match

== Evolve 98 ==
Evolve 98
- Promotion: Evolve Wrestling
- Date: January 13, 2018
- City: New York City, New York
- Venue: La Boom

No.	Results	Stipulations	Times
1	Jason Kincaid defeated Brody King, Jarek 1-20 (with Candy Cartwright) and Snoop Strikes	Four-way freestyle match	6:14
2	Ringkampf (Timothy Thatcher and Walter) defeated Catch Point (Dominic Garrini and Tracy Williams) (with Stokely Hathaway)	Tag team match	15:10
3	Chris Dickinson defeated Parrow	No Disqualification match	8:25
4	A. R. Fox defeated Matt Riddle	Singles match	11:00
5	Austin Theory (with Priscilla Kelly) (c) defeated Fred Yehi	"Anything goes" match for the FIP World Heavyweight Championship	14:25
6	Jaka defeated Keith Lee	Singles match	16:20
7	Zack Sabre Jr. (c) defeated Darby Allin by referee stoppage	Singles match for the Evolve Championship	19:40
(c) / – the champion(s) heading into the match

== Evolve 99 ==
Evolve 99
- Promotion: Evolve Wrestling
- Date: January 14, 2018
- City: Brooklyn, New York
- Venue: Saint Finbar Catholic Church Gym

No.	Results	Stipulations	Times
1	Brody King vs. Darby Allin ended in a time limit draw	Singles match	10:00
2	Jarek 1-20 (with Candy Cartwright) defeated Snoop Strikes	Singles match	5:38
3	KTB defeated Wheeler Yuta	Singles match	5:13
4	Austin Theory (with Priscilla Kelly) defeated Jason Kincaid by referee stoppage	Singles match	8:57
5	Timothy Thatcher defeated Fred Yehi by submission	Singles match	13:52
6	The End Parrow and Odinson(with Drennen) defeated Catch Point (Dominic Garrini and Tracy Williams) (with Stokely Hathaway)	Tornado tag team match	7:51
7	Matt Riddle defeated Jaka by submission	Singles match	12:38
8	Walter defeated Zack Sabre Jr.	Singles match	18:05
9	Keith Lee (c) defeated Chris Dickinson	Singles match for the WWN Championship	16:00
(c) / – the champion(s) heading into the match

== Evolve 100 ==
Evolve 100
- Promotion: Evolve Wrestling
- Date: February 17, 2018
- City: New York City, New York
- Venue: La Boom

No.	Results	Stipulations	Times
1	Darby Allin defeated Jarek 1-20 (with Candy Cartwright) and Jason Kincaid	Three-way match	5:45
2	Fred Yehi defeated Dominic Garrini	Singles match	7:24
3	Anthony Henry defeated Tracy Williams (with Faye Jackson and Stokely Hathaway)	Singles match	10:58
4	Doom Patrol (Chris Dickinson and Jaka) (c) vs. The End (Odinson and Parrow) (with Drennen) ended in no-contest	Tag team match for the Evolve Tag Team Championship	4:36
5	Matt Riddle defeated JD Drake by referee stoppage	Singles match	13:36
6	Keith Lee (c) defeated A. R. Fox	Singles match for the WWN Championship	20:27
7	Zack Sabre Jr. (c) defeated Austin Theory (with Priscilla Kelly) by submission	Singles match for the Evolve Championship	19:06
(c) / – the champion(s) heading into the match

== Evolve 101 ==
Evolve 101
- Promotion: Evolve Wrestling
- Date: February 18, 2018
- City: Joppa, Maryland
- Venue: MCW Arena
- Attendance: ca. 300

No.	Results	Stipulations	Times
1^{D}	Dominic Garrini defeated KTB by submission	Singles match	3:35
2^{D}	Rayo defeated Ace Perry and Dante Caballero	Three-way match	2:38
3^{D}	Jason Kincaid defeated Jarek 1-20 (with Candy Cartwright) by submission	Singles match	9:20
4	The End (Parrow and Odinson) (with Drennen) defeated Anthony Henry and JD Drake	Tag team match	6:35
5	Fred Yehi defeated Shane Mercer by submission	Singles match	11:45
6	Zack Sabre Jr. defeated Chris Dickinson by referee stoppage	Singles match	16:15
7	Joe Keys defeated Ken Dixon	MCW showcase match	7:30
8	Keith Lee defeated Tracy Williams (with Dominic Garrini and Stokely Hathaway)	No Holds Barred match	19:33
9	Matt Riddle defeated Austin Theory (with Priscilla Kelly), Darby Allin and Jaka	Four-way elimination match to determine the #1 contender for the Evolve Championship	14:00
D / – this was a dark match

=== Four-way elimination match ===
Eliminated	Wrestler	Eliminated by	Method of elimination	Time
1	Austin Theory	Darby Allin	Pinned after a Sunset flip powerbomb	8:20
2	Darby Allin	Jaka	Pinned after a Sitout powerbomb	11:50
3	Jaka	Matt Riddle	Pinned after a Kneeling reverse piledriver	14:00
Winner	Matt Riddle			14:00

== Evolve 102 ==
Evolve 102
- Promotion: Evolve Wrestling
- Date: April 5, 2018
- City: Kenner, Louisiana
- Venue: Pontchartrain Convention & Civic Center

No.	Results	Stipulations	Times
1	DJ Z defeated Austin Theory	Singles match	9:00
2	Will Ospreay defeated A. R. Fox (with Ayla Fox)	Singles match	16:20
3	The End (Parrow and Odinson) (with Drennan) defeated Catch Point (Dominic Garrini and Tracy Williams), Doom Patrol (Jaka and Chris Dickinson) (with Stokely Hathaway) (c) and The WorkHorsemen (Anthony Henry and JD Drake)	Four-way scramble match for the Evolve Tag Team Championship	8:59
4	Keith Lee defeated Darby Allin	Singles match	10:24
5	Ringkampf (Timothy Thatcher and Walter) defeated Daisuke Sekimoto and Munenori Sawa by submission	Tag team match	21:52
6	Matt Riddle defeated Zack Sabre Jr. (c) by submission	Singles match for the Evolve Championship	20:56
(c) / – the champion(s) heading into the match

== Evolve 103 ==
Evolve 103
- Promotion: Evolve Wrestling
- Date: April 6, 2018
- City: Kenner, Louisiana
- Venue: Pontchartrain Convention & Civic Center

No.	Results	Stipulations	Times
1	Austin Theory (FIP Champion) defeated Keith Lee (WWN Champion)	Singles match for the FIP World Heavyweight Championship and WWN Championship	10:42
2	Timothy Thatcher defeated Dominic Garrini (with Stokely Hathaway)	Singles match	5:26
3	A. R. Fox defeated Chris Brookes, DJ Z and Jason Kincaid	Four-way freestyle match	8:31
4	Chris Dickinson defeated Mark Haskins by submission	Singles match	16:49
5	Walter defeated Tracy Williams by submission	Singles match	8:54
6	Munenori Sawa defeated Jaka by submission	Singles match	10:43
7	Matt Riddle (c) defeated Daisuke Sekimoto by referee stoppage	No rope breaks match for the Evolve Championship	15:26
(c) / – the champion(s) heading into the match

== Evolve 104 ==
Evolve 104
- Promotion: Evolve Wrestling
- Date: May 19, 2018
- City: Summit, Illinois
- Venue: Summit Park District

No.	Results	Stipulations	Times
1	A. R. Fox defeated Zachary Wentz	Singles match	11:50
2	Josh Briggs defeated Tommy Maserati	Singles match	0:17
3	Tracy Williams defeated Dominic Garrini (with Stokely Hathaway) by submission	Singles match	7:14
4	Chris Castro, Isaias Velazquez and Matt Knicks defeated Bu Ku Dao, J. Spade and Johnny Flex	Six-man tag team match	9:40
5	Anthony Henry defeated Stevie Fierce	Singles match	9:30
6	Austin Theory (c) (with Priscilla Kelly) defeated DJ Z	Singles match for the WWN Championship	9:41
7	Doom Patrol (Jaka and Chris Dickinson) (c) (with Dominic Garrini) defeated The End (Parrow and Odinson) (with Drennen)	"Anything goes" Tag team match for the Evolve Tag Team Championship	8:40
8	Darby Allin defeated Myron Reed, Snoop Strikes and Trey Miguel	Four-way freestyle match	8:31
9	Keith Lee defeated (James Drake	Singles match	20:15
10	Matt Riddle defeated Shane Strickland by disqualification	Singles match	19:58
(c) / – the champion(s) heading into the match

== Evolve 105 ==
Evolve 105
- Promotion: Evolve Wrestling
- Date: May 20, 2018
- City: Livonia, Michigan
- Venue: Knights Of Columbus Hall

No.	Results	Stipulations	Times
1	N8 Mattson and Orlando Christopher defeated The End (Drennan and Parrow) (with Odinson) by disqualification	Tag team match	9:05
2	Tracy Williams defeated Odinson (with Drennan and Parrow) by submission	Singles match	9:25
3	A. R. Fox defeated Myron Reed	Singles match	13:00
4	Josh Briggs defeated AC Mack, Bu Ku Dao, Dominic Garrini, J. Spade, Johnny Flex, Matt Delray and Snoop Strikes	Eight-way fray match	8:35
5	DJ Z defeated Zachary Wentz	Singles match	9:50
6	Shane Strickland defeated Darby Allin by referee stoppage	Singles match	15:05
7	Austin Theory (with Priscilla Kelly) defeated Trey Miguel	Singles match	9:36
8	Doom Patrol (Jaka and Chris Dickinson) (c) (with Dominic Garrini and Stokely Hathaway) defeated The WorkHorsemen (Anthony Henry and JD Drake)	Tag team match for the Evolve Tag Team Championship	16:40
9	Matt Riddle (c) defeated Keith Lee	No rope breaks match for the Evolve Championship	18:10
(c) / – the champion(s) heading into the match

== Evolve 106 ==
Evolve 106
- Promotion: Evolve Wrestling
- Date: June 23, 2018
- City: New York City, New York
- Venue: Most Precious Blood Youth Center

No.	Results	Stipulations	Times
1	Josh Briggs defeated Bad Bones	Singles match	8:51
2	Jon Davis defeated Jarek 1-20 (with Candy Cartwright)	Singles match	6:25
3	Adrian Alanis and Liam Gray defeated Leon Ruff and Tommy Maserati	Tag team match	6:39
4	A. R. Fox (with Ayla Fox) defeated DJ Z	Singles match	11:36
5	Darby Allin defeated Walter	Singles match	13:17
6	Bryan Idol defeated Mike Verna	Singles match	6:20
7	Catch Point (Chris Dickinson, Dominic Garrini and Jaka) (with Stokely Hathaway) defeated Anthony Henry, Timothy Thatcher and Tracy Williams	Six-man tag team match	15:18
8	Joey Janela (with Penelope Ford) defeated Austin Theory (with Priscilla Kelly) (c)	Singles match for the WWN Championship	13:54
9	Matt Riddle (c) vs. Shane Strickland ended in no-contest	No rope breaks match for the Evolve Championship	15:17
(c) / – the champion(s) heading into the match

== Evolve 107 ==
Evolve 107
- Promotion: Evolve Wrestling
- Date: June 24, 2018
- City: Melrose, Massachusetts
- Venue: Melrose Memorial Hall

No.	Results	Stipulations	Times
1	Josh Briggs defeated Dominic Garrini (with Stokely Hathaway)	Singles match	5:15
2	Adrian Alanis (with A. R. Fox) defeated Bshp King	Singles match	4:55
3	Darby Allin defeated Jarek 1-20 (with Candy Cartwright)	Singles match	8:46
4	Anthony Henry defeated Timothy Thatcher by submission	Singles match	11:12
5	Austin Theory (with Priscilla Kelly) (c) defeated DJ Z and Joey Janela (with Penelope Ford	Three-way match for the FIP World Heavyweight Championship	9:00
6	Saieve Al Sabah defeated Bad Bones, Jaka and Jon Davis	Four-way freestyle match	10:10
7	Chris Dickinson (with Stokely Hathaway) defeated Tracy Williams by disqualification	"Catch Point Rules" match	0:35
8	Matt Riddle (c) defeated A. R. Fox (with Ayla Fox) by referee stoppage	Singles match for the Evolve Championship	12:00
9^{D}	Adam Cole (c) defeated Walter	Singles match for the NXT North American Championship	—
(c) / – the champion(s) heading into the match; D / – this was a dark match

== Evolve 108 ==
Evolve 108
- Promotion: Evolve Wrestling
- Date: August 4, 2018
- City: Philadelphia, Pennsylvania
- Venue: 2300 Arena

No.	Results	Stipulations	Times
1	Saieve Al Sabah defeated Anthony Henry	Singles match	12:52
2	Parrow (with Drennan and Odinson) defeated Tommy Maserati (with Adrian Alanis, A. R. Fox, Ayla Fox, Leon Ruff and Liam Gray)	Singles match	1:05
3	JD Drake defeated Jon Davis, and Josh Briggs and Odinson (with Drennan and Parrow)	Four-way freestyle match	7:30
4	Darby Allin defeated Austin Theory	Singles match	11:10
5	A. R. Fox (with Ayla Fox) defeated Joey Janela (with Penelope Ford)	Singles match	14:05
6	Doom Patrol (Chris Dickinson and Jaka) (c) (with Dominic Garrini and Stokely Hathaway) defeated TK Cooper and Tracy Williams	Tag team match for the Evolve Tag Team Championship	13:15
7	Shane Strickland defeated Matt Riddle (c)	"Hardcore war" match for the Evolve Championship	28:37
(c) / – the champion(s) heading into the match

== Evolve 109 ==
Evolve 109
- Promotion: Evolve Wrestling
- Date: August 5, 2018
- City: Melrose, Massachusetts
- Venue: Melrose Memorial Hall

No.	Results	Stipulations	Times
1	Anthony Henry defeated Jon Davis	Singles match	6:58
2	A. R. Fox defeated Saieve Al Sabah	Singles match	7:11
3	A. R. Fox and The Skulk (Adrian Alanis and Leon Ruff) defeated The End (Drennan, Odinson and Parrow)	Lucha libre rules Six-man tag team match	5:12
4	JD Drake defeated Dominic Garrini (with Stokely Hathaway)	Singles match	6:59
5	Josh Briggs defeated Jaka (with Stokely Hathaway)	Singles match	8:15
6	Chris Dickinson (with Stokely Hathaway) defeated Tracy Williams by submission	No Holds Barred match	14:55
7	Matt Riddle defeated Austin Theory by referee stoppage	Singles match	11:20
8	Joey Janela (c) (with Penelope Ford) defeated Darby Allin	Singles match for the WWN Championship	17:55
(c) / – the champion(s) heading into the match

== Evolve 110 ==
Evolve 110
- Promotion: Evolve Wrestling
- Date: August 11, 2018
- City: Chicago, Illinois
- Venue: Cicero Stadium

No.	Results	Stipulations	Times
1	Jake Parnell (c) defeated Gary Jay	Singles match for the Zero1 USA World Junior Heavyweight Championship	4:20
2	Isaias Velazquez (c) defeated Matt Knicks	Singles match for the FW Championship	4:34
3	Anthony Henry defeated Jon Davis and Josh Briggs	Three-way match	7:35
4	DJ Z defeated A. R. Fox (with Ayla Fox)	Singles match	13:17
5	Walter defeated JD Drake by technical submission	Singles match	15:02
6	Jaka (with Stokely Hathaway) defeated Tracy Williams	Singles match	8:40
7	The Skulk (Adrian Alanis, Leon Ruff and Tommy Maserati) defeated Catch Point (Chris Dickinson, Dominic Garrini and Stokely Hathaway)	Six-man tag team match	6:40
8	Austin Theory and Shane Strickland (with Priscilla Kelly) defeated Joey Janela and Saieve Al Sabah (with Penelope Ford)	Tag team match	16:17
9	Darby Allin defeated Matt Riddle	Singles match	15:40
(c) / – the champion(s) heading into the match

== Evolve 111 ==
Evolve 111
- Promotion: Evolve Wrestling
- Date: August 12, 2018
- City: Livonia, Michigan
- Venue: Knights Of Columbus Hall

No.	Results	Stipulations	Times
1	Saieve Al Sabah defeated Jaka	Singles match	12:10
2	Darby Allin defeated Bryan Idol	Singles match	3:17
3	Jon Davis vs. Josh Briggs ended in a double disqualification	Singles match	9:15
4	Walter defeated Anthony Henry	Singles match	12:25
5	Matt Riddle defeated JD Drake by technical submission	Singles match	14:30
6	Shane Strickland (c) defeated DJ Z by referee stoppage	Singles match for the Evolve Championship	20:42
7	A. R. Fox (with Ayla Fox) defeated Austin Theory (with Priscilla Kelly), Darby Allin and Joey Janela (c) (with Penelope Ford)	Four-way scramble match for the WWN Championship	9:04
8	Tracy Williams defeated Catch Point (Chris Dickinson and Stokely Hathaway)	Career vs. Career handicap "I Quit" match	19:40
(c) / – the champion(s) heading into the match

== Evolve 112 ==
Evolve 112
- Promotion: Evolve Wrestling
- Date: September 7, 2018
- City: Joppa, Maryland
- Venue: MCW Arena

No.	Results	Stipulations	Times
1	Jaka defeated Leon Ruff	Singles match	8:15
2	Facade and Jason Kincaid defeated Joe Gacy and Steve Pena	Tag team match	8:30
3	JD Drake defeated Harlem Bravado	Singles match	12:55
4	Priscilla Kelly defeated Aja Perera, Dementia D'Rose and Kiera Hogan	Four-way freestlye Shine Showcase match	7:30
5	Darby Allin defeated Anthony Henry	Singles match	12:05
6	Tracy Williams defeated Jon Davis	Singles match	13:13
7	Josh Briggs defeated Chris Dickinson	Singles match	10:40
8	Joey Janela (with Penelope Ford) (c) defeated A. R. Fox	Singles match for the WWN Championship	20:25
9^{D}	The Velveteen Dream defeated Austin Theory	Singles match	—
(c) / – the champion(s) heading into the match; D / – this was a dark match

== Evolve 113 ==
Evolve 113
- Promotion: Evolve Wrestling
- Date: September 8, 2018
- City: New York City, New York
- Venue: La Boom

No.	Results	Stipulations	Times
1	Anthony Henry defeated Facade, Harlem Bravado, Jason Kincaid, Jon Davis and Josh Briggs	Six-way freestyle match	15:40
2	JD Drake defeated Joey Janela (with Penelope Ford)	Singles match	13:40
3	Chris Dickinson defeated Stokely Hathaway	Singles match	0:30
4	The Doom Patrol (Jaka and Chris Dickinson) (c) defeated The Skulk (Adrian Alanis and Leon Ruff)	Tag team match for the Evolve Tag Team Championship	7:30
5	Austin Theory (with Priscilla Kelly) defeated A. R. Fox	Singles match	13:50
6	Shane Strickland (c) defeated Tracy Williams by submission	Singles match for the Evolve Championship	20:56
7^{D}	The Velveteen Dream defeated Darby Allin	Singles match	16:08
(c) / – the champion(s) heading into the match; D / – this was a dark match

== Evolve 114 ==
Evolve 114
- Promotion: Evolve Wrestling
- Date: October 28, 2018
- City: Ybor City, Florida
- Venue: The Orpheum

No.	Results	Stipulations	Times
1^{D}	The Precipice (Chance Champion and Omar Amir) defeated Mat Rogers and Zenshi	Tag team match	6:50
2	Darby Allin defeated Josh Briggs	WWN Championship qualifying match	10:20
3	Priscilla Kelly defeated Jessie Elaban by submission	Singles match	9:55
4	Adrian Jaoude (with Cezar Bononi) defeated Joe Gacy	Singles match	5:40
5	Leon Ruff defeated Barrett Brown	Singles match	10:30
6	Street Profits (Angelo Dawkins and Montez Ford) defeated Doom Patrol (Jaka and Chris Dickinson) (c)	Tag team match for the Evolve Tag Team Championship	14:50
7	Dante Marquis Carter vs. Mikey Spandex ended in no-contest	Singles match	—
8	Adrian Alanis defeated Dan Matha, Liam Gray and Shawn Dean	Four-way freestyle match	6:00
9	Fabian Aichner defeated Shane Strickland (c)	Singles match for the Evolve Championship	21:30
10	JD Drake defeated Anthony Henry, A. R. Fox (with Ayla Fox), Austin Theory (with Priscilla Kelly), Darby Allin and Harlem Bravado	Six-way ladder match for the vacant WWN Championship	32:55
(c) / – the champion(s) heading into the match; D / – this was a dark match

== Evolve 115 ==
Evolve 115
- Promotion: Evolve Wrestling
- Date: November 9, 2018
- City: Livonia, Michigan
- Venue: Knights Of Columbus Hall

No.	Results	Stipulations	Times
1	Barrett Brown defeated Bshp King	Singles match	9:00
2	Mike Fierro defeated Juntai	Singles match	3:50
3	Harlem Bravado defeated Adrian Alanis, Jason Kincaid and Leon Ruff	Four-way freestyle match	12:30
4	Austin Theory (with Priscilla Kelly) defeated A. R. Fox (with Ayla Fox)	Singles match	1:30
5	Mustafa Ali defeated DJ Z	Singles match	15:20
6	Josh Briggs defeated Cody Vance	Singles match	1:15
7	Allysin Kay (c) defeated Shotzi Blackheart	Singles match for the Shine Championship	9:35
8	Street Profits (Angelo Dawkins and Montez Ford) (c) defeated The WorkHorsemen (Anthony Henry and JD Drake)	Tag team match for the Evolve Tag Team Championship	15:15
9	Fabian Aichner (c) defeated Kassius Ohno	Singles match for the Evolve Championship	19:00
10	A. R. Fox defeated Austin Theory	Unsanctioned match for leadership of The Skulk and ownership of WWA4	27:00
(c) / – the champion(s) heading into the match

== Evolve 116 ==
Evolve 116
- Promotion: Evolve Wrestling
- Date: November 10, 2018
- City: Oak Lawn, Illinois
- Venue: Oak Lawn Pavilion

No.	Results	Stipulations	Times
1	Jake Lander defeated Joey O'Riley	Singles match to determine the #1 contender for the Zero1 USA World Junior Heavyweight Championship	7:10
2	Adrian Alanis defeated Barrett Brown	Singles match	7:07
3	Josh Briggs defeated Jason Kincaid	Singles match	7:01
4	Isaias Velazquez (c) defeated GPA	Singles match for the FW Championship	7:50
5	Fabian Aichner defeated Anthony Henry by disqualification	Singles match	15:00
6	JD Drake (c) defeated Austin Theory (with Priscilla Kelly) and Harlem Bravado	Three-way match for the WWN Championship	9:50
7	Matt Knicks defeated Bshp King, Cyrus Satin and Mike Fierro	Four-way freestyle match	4:30
8	Kassius Ohno defeated Shane Strickland	Singles match	19:00
9	Street Profits (Angelo Dawkins and Montez Ford) (c) defeated A. R. Fox and Leon Ruff	Tag team match for the Evolve Tag Team Championship	19:50
10	Mustafa Ali defeated Darby Allin by submission	Singles match	15:00
(c) / – the champion(s) heading into the match

== Evolve 117 ==
Evolve 117
- Promotion: Evolve Wrestling
- Date: December 15, 2018
- City: New York City, New York
- Venue: La Boom

No.	Results	Stipulations
1	Harlem Bravado defeated Joe Bailey	Singles match
2	Bshp King defeated Joe Gacy	Singles match
3	Josh Briggs defeated Leon Ruff (with A. R. Fox)	Singles match
4	A. R. Fox defeated Curt Stallion	Singles match
5	Kassius Ohno defeated Darby Allin	Singles match
6	Street Profits (Angelo Dawkins and Montez Ford) (Evolve Tag Team Champions) [Tag Team] vs. The WorkHorsemen (Anthony Henry and JD Drake (WWN Champion)) ended in no-contest	Tag team match for the Evolve Tag Team Championship and JD Drake's WWN Championship
7	Austin Theory (with Priscilla Kelly) defeated Fabian Aichner (c) and Roderick Strong	Three-way match for the Evolve Championship
(c) / – the champion(s) heading into the match

== Evolve 118 ==
Evolve 118
- Promotion: Evolve Wrestling
- Date: December 16, 2018
- City: Deer Park, New York
- Venue: The Sportatorium

No.	Results	Stipulations
1^{D}	Joe Gacy defeated Joe Bailey	Singles match
2^{D}	Curt Stallion defeated Anthony Greene, Bshp King and Colby Corino	Four-way freestyle match
3	Priscilla Kelly defeated Shotzi Blackheart	Shine Showcase match
4	Eddie Kingston vs. JD Drake ended in no-contest	Singles match
5	Street Profits (Angelo Dawkins and Montez Ford) (c) defeated Austin Theory and Harlem Bravado	Tag team match for the Evolve Tag Team Championship
6	Josh Briggs defeated Adrian Alanis	Singles match
7	A. R. Fox (with Ayla Fox) defeated Leon Ruff	Singles match
8	Roderick Strong defeated Darby Allin	Singles match
9	Kassius Ohno defeated Anthony Henry	Singles match
(c) / – the champion(s) heading into the match; D / – this was a dark match

== Evolve 119 ==
Evolve 119
- Promotion: Evolve Wrestling
- Date: January 18, 2019
- City: New York City, New York
- Venue: Saint Finbar Catholic Church Gym

No.	Results	Stipulations
1	Joe Gacy defeated Colby Corino	Singles match
2	The Skulk (Adrian Alanis and Leon Ruff) defeated Lotus (Gavin Quinn and Juntai), Milk Chocolate (Brandon Watts and Randy Summers) and The Beaver Boys (Alex Reynolds and John Silver)	Four-way tag team match to determine the #1 contenders for the Evolve Tag Team Championship
3	Priscilla Kelly defeated Trish Adora	Shine Showcase match
4	Anthony Henry defeated Curt Stallion	Singles match
5	Fabian Aichner defeated Darby Allin	Singles match
6	Liam Gray defeated Cyrus Satin	Singles match
7	Street Profits (Angelo Dawkins and Montez Ford) (c) defeated The Skulk (Adrian Alanis and Leon Ruff)	Tag team match for the Evolve Tag Team Championship
8	JD Drake (c) defeated Eddie Kingston	No Disqualification match for the WWN Championship
9	A. R. Fox and Johnny Gargano (with Ayla Fox) defeated Austin Theory and Josh Briggs by submission	Tag team match
(c) / – the champion(s) heading into the match

== Evolve 120 ==
Evolve 120
- Promotion: Evolve Wrestling
- Date: January 19, 2019
- City: New York City, New York
- Venue: La Boom

No.	Results	Stipulations
1	Montez Ford defeated Eddie Kingston	Singles match
2	Josh Briggs defeated Angelo Dawkins	Singles match
3	JD Drake defeated Joe Gacy	Singles match
4	Curt Stallion defeated Leon Ruff and Orange Cassidy	Three-way match
5	Anthony Henry defeated A. R. Fox	Singles match to determine the #1 contenders for the Evolve Championship
6	Darby Allin defeated Fabian Aichner	Singles match
7	Johnny Gargano defeated Austin Theory by submission	Singles match

== Evolve 121 ==
Evolve 121
- Promotion: Evolve Wrestling
- Date: February 15, 2019
- City: Atlanta, Georgia
- Venue: Kroc Center

No.	Results	Stipulations
1	Josh Briggs defeated Curt Stallion	Singles match
2	Joe Gacy defeated Trey Williams	Singles match
3	JD Drake defeated Harlem Bravado	Singles match
4	Aja Perera (c) defeated Priscilla Kelly	Singles match for the Shine Nova Championship
5	Anthony Henry defeated Eddie Kingston by disqualification	Singles match
6	Austin Theory (c) defeated Darby Allin	Singles match for the Evolve Championship
7	Leon Ruff defeated Adrian Alanis, Damyan Tangra, Kavron Kanyon, Liam Gray and Takuri	Six-man scramble match
8	Adam Cole defeated Shane Strickland	Singles match
9	Street Profits (Angelo Dawkins and Montez Ford) (c) defeated A. R. Fox and DJZ	Tag team match for the Evolve Tag Team Championship
(c) / – the champion(s) heading into the match

== Evolve 122 ==
Evolve 122
- Promotion: Evolve Wrestling
- Date: February 16, 2019
- City: Concord, North Carolina
- Venue: Cabarrus Arena & Events Center

No.	Results	Stipulations
1	Harlem Bravado defeated Curt Stallion	Singles match
2	Josh Briggs defeated DJ Z	Singles match
3	Joe Gacy defeated Colby Corino, Leon Ruff and Slim J	Four-way freestyle match
4	Shane Strickland defeated A. R. Fox	Singles match
5	Austin Theory (c) defeated Anthony Henry	Singles match for the Evolve Championship
6	Angelo Dawkins defeated Eddie Kingston by disqualification	Singles match
7	JD Drake (c) defeated Montez Ford	Singles match for the WWN Championship
8	Adam Cole defeated Darby Allin	Singles match
(c) / – the champion(s) heading into the match

== Evolve 123 ==
Evolve 123
- Promotion: Evolve Wrestling
- Date: March 15, 2019
- City: Melrose, Massachusetts
- Venue: Melrose Memorial Hall

No.	Results	Stipulations
1	Curt Stallion defeated Colby Corino (with Eddie Kingston, Joe Gacy and Shane Strickland)	Singles match
2	Josh Briggs defeated Darby Allin	Singles match
3	Adrian Jaoude defeated Rory Gulak	Singles match
4	A. R. Fox and Leon Ruff defeated Anthony Henry and JD Drake	Tag team match
5	Austin Theory (c) defeated John Silver	Singles match for the Evolve Championship
6	Shane Strickland defeated Harlem Bravado	Singles match
7	The Unwanted (Eddie Kingston and Joe Gacy) defeated Street Profits (Angelo Dawkins and Montez Ford) (c)	Tag team match for the Evolve Tag Team Championship
8	Velveteen Dream defeated Orange Cassidy	Singles match
(c) / – the champion(s) heading into the match

== Evolve 124 ==
Evolve 124
- Promotion: Evolve Wrestling
- Date: March 16, 2019
- City: New York City, New York
- Venue: La Boom

No.	Results	Stipulations	Times
1	Priscilla Kelly defeated Brandi Lauren	Singles match	2:55
2	Darby Allin defeated Anthony Henry by disqualification	Singles match	8:30
3	Harlem Bravado defeated John Silver	Singles match	8:35
4	Adrian Jaoude defeated Wheeler Yuta by submission	Singles match	4:02
5	Curt Stallion defeated Leon Ruff	Singles match	13:00
6	Adrian Alanis defeated Anthony Greene, Liam Gray and Mike Orlando	Four-way freestyle match	5:15
7	Josh Briggs defeated A. R. Fox	Singles match	16:55
8	JD Drake (c) defeated Austin Theory	Singles match for the WWN Championship	16:50
9	Street Profits (Angelo Dawkins and Montez Ford) and Velveteen Dream defeated The Unwanted (Eddie Kingston, Joe Gacy and Shane Strickland)	Six-man tag team match	13:25
(c) / – the champion(s) heading into the match

== Evolve 125 ==
Evolve 125
- Promotion: Evolve Wrestling
- Date: April 4, 2019
- City: New York City, New York
- Venue: La Boom

No.	Results	Stipulations	Times
1	Adrian Jaoude defeated Harlem Bravado by submission	Singles match	4:55
2	Kazusada Higuchi defeated Curt Stallion	Singles match	11:25
3	A. R. Fox and Leon Ruff defeated The Beaver Boys (Alex Reynolds and John Silver)	Tag team match	15:50
4	Anthony Henry defeated Darby Allin (with Priscilla Kelly) by referee stoppage	Singles match	7:27
5	Angelo Dawkins defeated Colby Corino	Singles match	2:30
6	JD Drake (c) defeated Angelo Dawkins	Singles match for the WWN Championship	8:00
7	Montez Ford defeated Shane Strickland	Singles match	12:45
8	The Unwanted (Eddie Kingston and Joe Gacy) (c) defeated Konosuke Takeshita and Mao	Tag team match for the Evolve Tag Team Championship	14:10
9	Austin Theory (c) defeated Kyle O'Reilly	Singles match for the Evolve Championship	20:20
(c) / – the champion(s) heading into the match

== Evolve 126 ==
Evolve 126
- Promotion: Evolve Wrestling
- Date: April 13, 2019
- City: Ybor City, Florida
- Venue: The Orpheum

No.	Results	Stipulations	Times
1	Milk Chocolate (Brandon Watts and Randy Summers) defeated Task Force (GMC and Mikey Spandex)	Tag team match	6:40
2	Brandi Lauren defeated Lacey Lane	Singles match	7:20
3	Kona Reeves defeated Colby Corino	Singles match	8:20
4	Anthony Henry vs. Adrian Jaoude ended in a double disqualification	Singles match	6:00
5	Shane Thorne defeated Curt Stallion by submission	Singles match	11:45
6	Leon Ruff defeated A. R. Fox and Adrian Alanis	Three-way match	14:50
7	Angelo Dawkins defeated Eddie Kingston	Falls Count Anywhere match	4:40
8	Austin Theory (c) defeated Raul Mendoza	Singles match for the Evolve Championship	15:50
9	JD Drake (c) defeated Shane Strickland	Singles match for the WWN Championship	27:59
(c) / – the champion(s) heading into the match

== Evolve 127 ==
Evolve 127
- Promotion: Evolve Wrestling
- Date: May 10, 2019
- City: Livonia, Michigan
- Venue: Monaghan Knights Of Columbus Hall

No.	Results	Stipulations
1	Adrian Jaoude defeated Josh Briggs	Singles match
2	Steven Pena defeated Liam Gray	Singles match
3	Babatunde defeated Adrian Alanis	Singles match
4	Anthony Greene defeated Stephen Wolf	Singles match
5	Anthony Henry defeated Juntai	Singles match
6	The Skulk (A. R. Fox and Leon Ruff) defeated Harlem Bravado and Kassius Ohno	Tag team match
7	Brandi Lauren defeated Randi West	Singles match
8	Curt Stallion defeated Eddie Kingston	Singles match
9	JD Drake (c) defeated Joe Gacy	Singles match for the WWN Championship
10	Adam Cole defeated Austin Theory	Singles match
(c) / – the champion(s) heading into the match

== Evolve 128 ==
Evolve 128
- Promotion: Evolve Wrestling
- Date: May 11, 2019
- City: Indianapolis, Indiana
- Venue: Southside Turners

No.	Results	Stipulations
1^{D}	Anthony Greene defeated Steve Pena	Singles match
2	Adrian Jaoude defeated Harlem Bravado	Singles match
3	Leon Ruff defeated Brandon Taggart, Juntai and Stephen Wolf	Four-way match
4	Babatunde defeated Liam Gray	Singles match
5	Curt Stallion defeated Ace Perry	Singles match
6	Austin Theory (c) defeated Nate Webb	Singles match for the Evolve Championship
7	Shotzi Blackheart defeated Natalia Markova	Singles match
8	Kassius Ohno defeated Josh Briggs	Singles match
9	The Unwanted (Eddie Kingston and Joe Gacy) (c) defeated Anthony Henry and JD Drake	Tag team match for the Evolve Tag Team Championship
10	Adam Cole defeated A. R. Fox	Singles match
(c) / – the champion(s) heading into the match; D / – this was a dark match

== Evolve 129 ==
Evolve 129
- Promotion: Evolve Wrestling
- Date: June 29, 2019
- City: New York City, New York
- Venue: La Boom

No.	Results	Stipulations	Times
1	Milk Chocolate (Brandon Watts and Randy Summers) defeated The Skulk (Adrian Alanis and Liam Gray)	Tag team match to determine the #1 contenders for the Evolve Tag Team Championship	5:06
2	Babatunde defeated Harlem Bravado	Singles match	6:11
3	JD Drake (c) defeated John Silver (with Alex Reynolds), Sean Maluta and Takuri	Four-way match for the WWN Championship	9:15
4	Brandi Lauren vs. Shotzi Blackheart ended in no contest	Singles match	4:59
5	Arturo Ruas defeated Josh Briggs by referee stoppage	Singles match	9:25
6	The Unwanted (Eddie Kingston and Joe Gacy) (c) defeated Anthony Greene and Curt Stallion	Tag team match for the Evolve Tag Team Championship	10:11
7	Tyler Breeze defeated A. R. Fox (with Ayla Fox)	Singles match	11:55
8	Roderick Strong (with Bobby Fish and Kyle O'Reilly) defeated Anthony Henry (with JD Drake) by submission	Singles match	14:18
9	Austin Theory (c) defeated Leon Ruff	Singles match for the Evolve Championship	12:37
(c) / – the champion(s) heading into the match

== Evolve 130 ==
Evolve 130
- Promotion: Evolve Wrestling
- Date: June 30, 2019
- City: Brooklyn, New York
- Venue: Saint Finbar Catholic Church Gym

No.	Results	Stipulations
1	Adrian Alanis vs. Harlem Bravado vs. Stephen Wolf ended in no contest	Three-way match
2	Brandi Lauren defeated Natalia Markova	Singles match
3	Josh Briggs defeated Brandon Taggart	Singles match
4	Curt Stallion defeated Sean Maluta	Singles match
5	JD Drake (c) vs. Babatunde ended in no contest	Singles match for the WWN Championship
6	Anthony Guttierez defeated Steven Pena	Singles match
7	Josh Briggs defeated Arturo Ruas	Singles match
8	Tyler Breeze defeated Anthony Greene	Singles match
9	The Skulk (A. R. Fox and Leon Ruff) defeated The Unwanted (Eddie Kingston and Joe Gacy) and The Beaver Boys (Alex Reynolds and John Silver) and Milk Chocolate (Brandon Watts and Randy Summers)	Four-way tag team elimination match
10	Roderick Strong defeated Austin Theory	Singles match
(c) / – the champion(s) heading into the match

== Evolve's 10th Anniversary Celebration ==
No.	Results	Stipulations	Times
1	Josh Briggs defeated Anthony Greene (with Brandi Lauren)	Singles match The Future Is Now Showcase match	11:49
2	Stephen Wolf defeated Curt Stallion, Sean Maluta, and Harlem Bravado	Fatal four-way match	9:19
3	Arturo Ruas defeated Anthony Henry	Grudge match	9:45
4	Brandi Lauren defeated Shotzi Blackheart	No Disqualification match	9:49
5	Babatunde defeated Colby Corino	Singles match Special Challenge match	3:09
6	A. R. Fox and Leon Ruff (with Ayla and The Skulk) defeated The UnWanted (Eddie Kingston and Joe Gacy) (c)	Tag team match for the Evolve Tag Team Championship	5:25
7	Matt Riddle (with Curt Stallion) defeated Drew Gulak	Singles match Catch Point Reunion match	13:37
8	Austin Theory (c – Evolve) defeated JD Drake (c – WWN)	Winner Takes All match for both the WWN Championship and Evolve Championship	16:22
9	Adam Cole (c) defeated Akira Tozawa	Singles match for the NXT Championship	13:15
(c) / – the champion(s) heading into the match

== Evolve 132 ==
Evolve 132
- Promotion: Evolve Wrestling
- Date: July 14, 2019
- City: Melrose, Massachusetts
- Venue: Melrose Memorial Hall

No.	Results	Stipulations
1	Stephen Wolf defeated Harlem Bravado	Singles match
2	Anthony Henry defeated Sean Maluta	Singles match
3	Shotzi Blackheart defeated Ashley Vox	Singles match
4	Babatunde defeated Joe Gacy by disqualification	Singles match
5	Arturo Ruas and Austin Theory defeated Josh Briggs and Orange Cassidy	Tag team match
6	The Skulk (Adrian Alanis and Liam Gray) defeated Christian Casanova and DL Hurst	Tag team match
7	Anthony Greene defeated Leon Ruff	Singles match
8	A. R. Fox defeated JD Drake	Singles match
9	Matt Riddle defeated Curt Stallion	Singles match

== Evolve 133 ==
Evolve 133
- Promotion: Evolve Wrestling
- Date: August 24, 2019
- City: Livonia, Michigan
- Venue: Monaghan Knights Of Columbus Hall

No.	Results	Stipulations
1	Anthony Gutierrez defeated Karam by submission	Singles match for an Evolve contract
2	Shotzi Blackheart defeated Camron Bra'Nae	Singles match
3	Adrian Alanis defeated Brandon Taggart	Singles match
4	Arturo Ruas defeated Stephen Wolf by submission	Singles match
5	Anthony Greene (with Brandi Lauren) defeated Curt Stallion by disqualification	Singles match
6	Kushida defeated JD Drake by submission	Singles match
7	Anthony Henry defeated Austin Theory by submission	Singles match
8	Matt Riddle (with Curt Stallion) defeated Josh Briggs by submission	Singles match
9	A. R. Fox and Leon Ruff (c) (with Ayla Fox) defeated The Unwanted (Joe Gacy and Sean Maluta)	Tag team match for the Evolve Tag Team Championship
(c) / – the champion(s) heading into the match

== Evolve 134 ==
Evolve 134
- Promotion: Evolve Wrestling
- Date: August 25, 2019
- City: Chicago, Illinois
- Venue: Logan Square Auditorium

No.	Results	Stipulations
1^{D}	Jake Parnell (c) defeated Brubaker	Singles match for the Zero1 USA Heavyweight Championship
2	The Skulk (Adrian Alanis and Liam Gray) defeated Besties in the World (Davey Vega and Mat Fitchett) and The Unwanted (Joe Gacy and Sean Maluta)	Triple threat tag team match
3	Anthony Gutierrez defeated Jimmy Karryt by submission	Singles match
4	Anthony Henry defeated Arturo Ruas	No Holds Barred match
5	Brandon Taggart defeated Craig Mitchell, GPA, Karam, Noah Gray and Stephen Wolf	Six-way freestyle match
6	A. R. Fox and Leon Ruff (c) (with Ayla Fox) defeated Curt Stallion and Matt Riddle	Tag team match for the Evolve Tag Team Championship
7	Anthony Greene (with Brandi Lauren) defeated Paco	Singles match
8	Shotzi Blackheart defeated Brandi Lauren	Kendo sticks are legal match
9	Austin Theory (c) defeated JD Drake and Josh Briggs	Triple threat match for the Evolve Championship
10	Drew Gulak (c) defeated Kushida	Singles match for the WWE Cruiserweight Championship
(c) / – the champion(s) heading into the match; D / – this was a dark match

== Evolve 135 ==
Evolve 135
- Promotion: Evolve Wrestling
- Date: September 20, 2019
- City: New York City, New York
- Venue: Saint Finbar Catholic Church Gym

No.	Results	Stipulations
1	KC Navarro defeated Anthony Henry	Singles match
2	Avery Taylor defeated Alex Gracia, Brandi Lauren, Natalia Markova, Shotzi Blackheart and Vanity	Six-way freestyle match
3	Arturo Ruas defeated John Silver	Singles match
4	Curt Stallion defeated Anthony Gutierrez, Daniel Garcia and Karam	Evolution's Edge Tournament first round elimination four-way match
5	Babatunde defeated Austin Theory by disqualification	Singles match
6	A. R. Fox and The Skulk (Leon Ruff and Liam Gray) (c) defeated The Unwanted (Eddie Kingston and Joe Gacy) and Mike Donovan	Six-man tag team match for the Evolve Tag Team Championship
7	Harlem Bravado defeated Adrian Alanis	Singles match
8	Anthony Greene defeated Big Game Leroy, Brandon Taggart and Sean Maluta	Evolution's Edge Tournament first round elimination four-way match
9	Kassius Ohno defeated Josh Briggs	Singles match
10	Walter defeated JD Drake	Singles match
(c) / – the champion(s) heading into the match

== Evolve 136 ==
Evolve 136
- Promotion: Evolve Wrestling
- Date: September 21, 2019
- City: New York City, New York
- Venue: La Boom

No.	Results	Stipulations	Times
1	Anthony Henry defeated JD Drake	Singles match	10:00
2	Brandon Taggart defeated Weatherman Josh	Singles match	2:30
3	Harlem Bravado defeated Daniel Garcia	Singles match	8:15
4	Shotzi Blackheart defeated Kris Statlander	Singles match	11:15
5	Arturo Ruas defeated Anthony Gutierrez	Singles match	5:00
6	Curt Stallion defeated Anthony Greene	Evolution's Edge Tournament final match	15:00
7	Karam, Mike Donovan and The Unwanted (Eddie Kingston, Joe Gacy and Sean Maluta) defeated A. R. Fox, Bobby Flaco and The Skulk (Adrian Alanis, Leon Ruff and Liam Gray) 2–1	Two-out-of-three falls ten-man tag team match	21:35
8	Walter defeated Kassius Ohno	Singles match	12:50
9	Austin Theory (c) defeated Josh Briggs	Singles match for the Evolve Championship	10:00
(c) / – the champion(s) heading into the match

== Evolve 137 ==
Evolve 137
- Promotion: Evolve Wrestling
- Date: October 11, 2019
- City: Atlanta, Georgia
- Venue: Kroc Center

No.	Results	Stipulations
1	Anthony Henry defeated Slim J	Singles match
2	Arturo Ruas defeated JD Drake	Singles match
3	Anthony Gutierrez defeated Colby Corino by submission	Singles match
4	Babatunde vs. Eddie Kingston ended in no-contest	Singles match
5	Shotzi Blackheart (c) defeated Aja Perera by submission	Singles match for the Shine Nova Championship
6	The Skulk (Adrian Alanis and Liam Gray) defeated Anthony Greene and Harlem Bravado (with Brandi Lauren)	Tag team match
7	Leon Ruff defeated Sean Maluta	Singles match
8	Cameron Grimes defeated Curt Stallion	Singles match
9	Josh Briggs defeated Kassius Ohno	Lights Out match
10	Austin Theory (c) defeated A. R. Fox	Singles match for the Evolve Championship
(c) / – the champion(s) heading into the match

== Evolve 138 ==
Evolve 138
- Promotion: Evolve Wrestling
- Date: October 12, 2019
- City: Concord, North Carolina
- Venue: Cabarrus Arena Event Center

No.	Results	Stipulations	Times
1	Shotzi Blackheart defeated Savannah Evans (with The Tommy Thomas)	Singles match	5:30
2	Josh Briggs defeated Adrian Alanis, Colby Corino and Harlem Bravado	Four-way freestyle match	8:49
3	Brandi Lauren defeated Jay Raves	Singles match	0:42
4	Babatunde defeated Sean Maluta	Singles match	5:03
5	Arturo Ruas defeated Anthony Gutierrez by submission	Singles match	6:51
6	Kassius Ohno defeated Curt Stallion by submission	Singles match	16:28
7	Liam Gray defeated John Skyler	Singles match	6:56
8	Cameron Grimes defeated Eddie Kingston	Singles match	9:29
9	A. R. Fox and Leon Ruff (c) (with Ayla and The Skulk) defeated Anthony Greene and Austin Theory (with Brandi Lauren)	Tag team match for the Evolve Tag Team Championship	15:28
10	JD Drake defeated Anthony Henry	Unsanctioned North Carolina Street Fight	28:52
(c) / – the champion(s) heading into the match

== Evolve 139 ==
Evolve 139
- Promotion: Evolve Wrestling
- Date: November 9, 2019
- City: New York City, New York
- Venue: La Boom

No.	Results	Stipulations
1	A. R. Fox defeated Colby Corino	Singles match
2	The Skulk (Adrian Alanis and Liam Gray) defeated Leroy Green and Wrecking Ball Legursky	Tag team match
3	Shotzi Blackheart defeated Reina Gonzalez by disqualification	Singles match
4	Anthony Greene and Harlem Bravado defeated Brandon Taggart and Curt Stallion	Tag team match
5	The Unwanted (Joe Gacy and Sean Maluta) defeated Anthony Gutierrez and Arturo Ruas	Tag team match
6	Babatunde defeated Eddie Kingston	Relaxed rules match
7	Leon Ruff defeated Matt Sydal by medical stoppage	Singles match
8	Anthony Henry defeated JD Drake	No Holds Barred match
9	Josh Briggs defeated Austin Theory (c)	Singles match for the Evolve Championship
(c) / – the champion(s) heading into the match

== Evolve 140 ==
Evolve 140
- Promotion: Evolve Wrestling
- Date: November 10, 2019
- City: New York City, New York
- Venue: Saint Finbar Catholic Church Gym

No.	Results	Stipulations
1	The Unwanted (Colby Corino and Sean Maluta) defeated Kekoa and Mike Verna	Tag team match
2	Reina Gonzalez defeated Alex Gracia	Singles match
3	Babatunde defeated Brandon Taggart	Singles match
4	Austin Theory defeated Curt Stallion	Singles match
5	Anthony Greene, Harlem Bravado and Matt Sydal defeated The Skulk (Adrian Alanis, Leon Ruff and Liam Gray)	Six-man tag team match
6	Anthony Gutierrez defeated Donovan	Singles match
7	Arturo Ruas defeated Eddie Kingston by disqualification	Singles match
8	Shotzi Blackheart defeated Allysin Kay	Singles match
9	Joe Gacy defeated A. R. Fox	Singles match
10	Josh Briggs (c) defeated Anthony Henry and JD Drake	Three-way match for the Evolve Championship
(c) / – the champion(s) heading into the match

== Evolve 141 ==
Evolve 141
- Promotion: Evolve Wrestling
- Date: December 6, 2019
- City: Livonia, Michigan
- Venue: Monaghan Knights Of Columbus Hall

No.	Results	Stipulations
1	Besties in the World (Davey Vega and Mat Fitchett) defeated The Skulk (Adrian Alanis and Liam Gray)	Tag team match to determine the #1 contenders for the Evolve Tag Team Championship
2	Brendan Vink defeated Colby Corino	Singles match
3	Harlem Bravado (with Anthony Greene and Brandi Lauren) defeated J-Rocc (with Mr. Ruder and Vipress)	Singles match
4	Reina Gonzalez defeated Shotzi Blackheart by disqualification	Singles match
5	A. R. Fox and Leon Ruff (c) (with Ayla Fox) defeated Andrew Everett and Matt Sydal	Tag team match for the Evolve Tag Team Championship
6	Curt Stallion defeated Anthony Greene (with Brandi Lauren)	Extreme Rules match
7	Natalia Markova (with Colby Corino, Eddie Kingston, Joe Gacy and Sean Maluta) defeated Camron Bra'Nae	Singles match
8	The Unwanted (Eddie Kingston, Joe Gacy and Sean Maluta) (w/Natalia Markova) defeated Anthony Gutierrez, Arturo Ruas and Babatunde	Six-man tag team match
9	Josh Briggs (c) defeated JD Drake	Singles match for the Evolve Championship
10	Walter defeated Timothy Thatcher	Singles match
(c) / – the champion(s) heading into the match

== Evolve 142 ==
Evolve 142
- Promotion: Evolve Wrestling
- Date: December 7, 2019
- City: Chicago, Illinois
- Venue: Logan Square Auditorium

No.	Results	Stipulations
1^{D}	Jake St. Patrick defeated Project Monix	Singles match
2^{D}	Elayna Black defeated Blair Onyx	Singles match
3^{D}	KLD defeated Dan The Dad	Singles match
4^{D}	Gnarls Garvin and Jake Lander defeated The Lowlifes (Joey O'Riley and Jordan Perry) (c)	Tag team match for the Zero1 USA World Tag Team Championship
5	Colby Corino defeated Sean Maluta	Singles match
6	Eddie Kingston defeated Anthony Gutierrez	Singles match
7	Joe Gacy defeated Andrew Everett	Singles match
8	Anthony Greene and Harlem Bravado (with Brandi Lauren) defeated Babatunde and Josh Briggs by disqualification	Tag team match
9	Brendan Vink defeated Adrian Alanis	Singles match
10	Arturo Ruas defeated Timothy Thatcher	Singles match
11	Reina Gonzalez defeated Shotzi Blackheart	No Disqualification match
12	Curt Stallion defeated Matt Sydal	Singles match
13	Besties in the World (Davey Vega and Mat Fitchett) defeated A. R. Fox and Leon Ruff (c) (with Ayla Fox)	Tag team match for the Evolve Tag Team Championship
14	Walter defeated Josh Briggs	Singles match
(c) / – the champion(s) heading into the match; D / – this was a dark match

== Evolve 143 ==
Evolve 143
- Promotion: Evolve Wrestling
- Date: January 17, 2020
- City: Ybor City, Florida
- Venue: The Orpheum

No.	Results	Stipulations
1	Joe Gacy (with Eddie Kingston) defeated Rik Bugez	Singles match
2	Indi Hartwell defeated Brandi Lauren (with Anthony Greene )	Singles match
3	Adrian Alanis defeated Denzel Dejournette	Singles match
4	Santana Garrett defeated Avery Taylor	Singles match
5	Dexter Lumis defeated Curt Stallion	Singles match
6	Leon Ruff defeated Ariel Dominguez, Liam Gray and Stephen Wolf	Four-way match
7	Brendan Vink defeated A. R. Fox (with Ayla Fox)	Singles match
8	Besties in the World (Davey Vega and Mat Fitchett) (c) defeated The Unwanted (Eddie Kingston and Joe Gacy)	Tag team match for the Evolve Tag Team Championship
9	Anthony Greene (with Brandi Lauren) defeated Josh Briggs	No Disqualification match
(c) / – the champion(s) heading into the match

== Evolve 144 ==
Evolve 144
- Promotion: Evolve Wrestling
- Date: January 18, 2020
- City: Fern Park, Florida
- Venue: Orlando Live Events Center

No.	Results	Stipulations
1^{D}	Stormie Lee defeated Alyx Sky	Singles match
2^{D}	Natalia Markova (c) defeated Jenna	Singles match for the Shine Nova Championship
3^{D}	BTY (Jayme Jameson and Marti Belle) defeated Triple Aye (Aja Perera and Big Swole) (c) (with Ayla Fox)	Tag team match for the Shine Tag Team Championship
4	Joe Gacy (with Donovan and Eddie Kingston) defeated Denzel Dejournette	Singles match
5	Brendan Vink defeated Stephen Wolf	Singles match
6	Rik Bugez defeated Anthony Greene (with Brandi Lauren)	Singles match
7	Brandi Lauren defeated Avery Taylor	Singles match
8	The Skulk (Adrian Alanis and Liam Gray) defeated Besties in the World (Davey Vega and Mat Fitchett)	Tag team match
9	Curt Stallion defeated Bobby Flaco, Donovan, Noah Clay and Troy Hollywood	Five-way elimination match
10	Anthony Gutierrez defeated Eddie Kingston	No Holds Barred match
11	Mansoor defeated A. R. Fox (with Ayla Fox)	Singles match
12	Josh Briggs (c) defeated Dexter Lumis	Singles match for the Evolve Championship
(c) / – the champion(s) heading into the match; D / – this was a dark match

== Evolve 145 ==
Evolve 145
- Promotion: Evolve Wrestling
- Date: February 29, 2020
- City: New York City, New York
- Venue: La Boom

No.	Results	Stipulations
1	Brendan Vink defeated JD Drake	Special Challenge match
2	Jessi Kamea defeated Alyx Sky	Singles match
3	Jon Davis defeated Vinny Pacifico	Singles match
4	Jake Atlas defeated Stephen Wolf	Singles match
5	Colby Corino defeated Joe Gacy	Grudge match
6	Brandi Lauren defeated Avery Taylor	Grudge match
7	Harlem Bravado defeated Denzel Dejournette	Singles match
8	Josh Briggs (c) defeated Anthony Greene	Singles match for the Evolve Championship
9	A. R. Fox & Leon Ruff vs. The Skulk (Adrian Alanis & Liam Grey) ended in double pin	Tag team match to determine the #1 contenders for the Evolve Tag Team Championship
10	Mansoor defeated Curt Stallion	Singles match
(c) / – the champion(s) heading into the match

== Evolve 146 ==
Evolve 146
- Promotion: Evolve Wrestling
- Date: March 1, 2020
- City: Melrose, Massachusetts
- Venue: Melrose Memorial Hall

No.	Results	Stipulations
1	Harlem Bravado defeated Stephen Wolf	Singles match
2	Avery Taylor & Natalia Markova defeated The In Crowd (Brandi Lauren & Jessi Kamea)	Tag Team match
3	Brendan Vink defeated Leon Ruff	Singles match
4	Denzel Dejournette & Jon Davis defeated The Skulk (Adrian Alanis & Liam Gray)	Tag Team match
5	Mansoor defeated Anthony Greene	Singles match
6	Alyx Sky defeated Vipress	Singles match
7	Joe Gacy defeated Colby Corino	Relaxed Rules match
8	JD Drake defeated Curt Stallion & Jake Atlas	Triple Threat match
9	A. R. Fox defeated Josh Briggs	Singles match
