= AAW Tag Team Championship =

Professional wrestling tag team championship

- Current design of the titles

Details
- Promotion: AAW Wrestling
- Date established: April 17, 2004
- Current champions: The Hellhounds (Russ Jones and Schaff)
- Date won: December 26, 2025
Statistics
- First champions: The Gravediggers (Botch and Machine)
- Most reigns: As Tag Team (4 reigns): The Irish Airborne
- Longest reign: The Gravediggers (Botch and Machine) (532 days)
- Shortest reign: Lucha Brothers (Penta el 0M and Rey Fenix) (15 days)
- Heaviest champion: Calvin Tankman (354 lbs)

The AAW Tag Team Championship is a professional wrestling world tag team championship which is created and promoted by the American professional wrestling promotion All American Wrestling (AAW). There have been a total of 49 reigns shared between 40 different teams consisting of 74 distinctive champions. The current holders are The Hellhounds, who are in their third reign as a team.

== Title history ==
Key
No.	Overall reign number
Reign	Reign number for the specific team—reign numbers for the individuals are in parentheses, if different
Days	Number of days held
+	Current reign is changing daily

No.	Champion	Championship change			Reign statistics		Notes	Ref.
No.	Champion	Date	Event	Location	Reign	Days	Notes	Ref.
1	The Gravediggers (Botch and Machine)	April 17, 2004	N/A	Berwyn, IL	1	532	The Gravediggers defeated Ladies Night Out, Dounn, Vanilla Shakes, Void Effect, Los Mexicanos, and the Top Guns in a Tag Team Turmoil Match to become the inaugural champions.	
2	Machine and Stu Early	October 1, 2005	A Monster's Rage	Berwyn, IL	1 (2, 1)	175	Defeated Simply Marvelous to win the vacant Tag Team Championship.	
3	The Black and The Brave (Marek Brave and Tyler Black)	March 25, 2006	Final Four	Berwyn, IL	1	49	This was a Four Corners match, which also involves The Michigan Invasion (N8 Mattson and Truth Martini) and (Eddie V and Zach Gowen).	
—	Vacated	May 13, 2006	—	Berwyn, IL	—	—	AAW Tag Team Championship Declared Vacant.	
4	Dan Lawrence and Ryan Boz	June 10, 2006	AAW Goldrush: Road to the Titles	Berwyn, IL	1	147	Boz and Lawrence defeated Team Underground (Eric Priest and Chandler McClure) and (Jimmy Jacobs and Zach Gowen) in the tournament finals to win the vacant championship.	
5	The Michigan Invasion (N8 Mattson and Truth Martini)	November 4, 2006	A Monster's Rage	Berwyn, IL	1	161	This was a Four Corners match, also involving Jayson Reign and Marco Cordova and The Phoenix Twins (Dash Phoenix and Tweek Phoenix).	
6	Krotch and Zach Gowen	April 14, 2007	War is Coming	Berwyn, IL	1	63		
7	DP Associates Berwyn Branch (Conrad Kennedy III and Trik Davis)	June 16, 2007	Point of No Return	Berwyn, IL	1	84	This was a Four Corners match, also involving Dan Lawrence and Ryan Boz and The Michigan Invasion (N8 Mattson and Truth Martini).	
8	The Murder City Machine Guns (Alex Shelley and Chris Sabin)	September 8, 2007	Reign of Violence	Berwyn, IL	1	133		
9	The North Star Express (Darin Corbin and Ryan Cruz)	January 19, 2008	Path of Redemption	Berwyn, IL	1	154	This was a three-way tag team match, also involving The Phoenix Twins (Dash Phoenix and Tweek Phoenix).	
10	Adrenaline Overdose (Bryce Benjamin and Shane Hollister)	June 21, 2008	Point of No Return	Berwyn, IL	1	77		
11	The North Star Express (Darin Corbin and Ryan Cruz)	September 6, 2008	Hostile Intentions	Berwyn, IL	2	83	The North Star Express defeated Shane Hollister in a Two On One Handicap match.	
12	The Phoenix Twins (Dash Phoenix and Tweek Phoenix)	November 28, 2008	Windy City Classic IV	Berwyn, IL	1	196	This was a Tables, Ladders, and Chairs match.	
13	The House of Truth (Christin Able and Josh Raymond)	June 12, 2009	Fate of Eight	Berwyn, IL	1	252	The House of Truth defeated Dash Phoenix and Matt Cross, who substituted for Tweek Phoenix. in a Fate of Eight 2009 Tournament Final match.	
14	Jimmy Jacobs and Tyler Black	February 19, 2010	Auditions	Davenport, IA	1 (1, 2)	217		
15	The House of Truth (Christin Able and Josh Raymond)	September 24, 2010	Defining Moment	Berwyn, IL	2	28		
16	Zero Gravity (Brett Gakiya and CJ Esparza)	October 22, 2010	MassacrepOn 26th Street	Berwyn, IL	1	238	Zero Gravity defeated Christin Able and Truth Martini, who substituted for Josh Raymond.	
17	The Awesome Threesome (Jordan McEntyre and Knight Wagner)	June 17, 2011	Day of Defiance	Berwyn, IL	1	105		
18	The Irish Airborne (Dave Crist and Jake Crist)	September 30, 2011	Defining Moment	Berwyn, IL	1	119	This was a three-way tag team match, also involving The NorthStache Express (Darin Corbin and Marion Fontaine).	
19	Arik Cannon and Jimmy Jacobs	January 27, 2012	The Chaos Theory	Berwyn, IL	1 (1, 2)	302		
20	The Irish Airborne (Dave Crist and Jake Crist)	November 24, 2012	Windy City Classic VIII	Merrionette Park, IL	2	245		
21	Kung Fu Manchu (Louis Lyndon and Marion Fontaine)	July 27, 2013	Scars and Stripes	Merrionette Park, IL	1	154		
22	Ethan Page and Michael Elgin	December 28, 2013	One Twisted Christmas	Berwyn, IL	1	258	This was a Triple Threat Tag Team Elimination match, also involving Zero Gravity (Brett Gakiya and CJ Esparza).	
—	Vacated	September 12, 2014	—	Berwyn, IL	—	—	The championship was vacated due to Elgin's Visa problems.	
23	The Wet Bandits (Dan Lawrence and Markus Crane)	October 17, 2014	Jawbreaker	Berwyn, IL	1 (2, 1)	134	The Wet Bandits defeated Athena and Heidi Lovelace in a tournament finale to win the vacant championship.	
24	OI4K (Dave Crist and Jake Crist)	February 28, 2015	The Art of War	Berwyn, IL	3	202	OI4K were formerly known as The Irish Airborne.	
25	The Hooligans (Devin Cutter and Mason Cutter)	September 18, 2015	Defining Moment	Berwyn, IL	1	204	This was a falls count anywhere match.	
26	Besties in the World (Davey Vega and Mat Fitchett)	April 9, 2016	AAW Epic 2016: The 12 Year Anniversary Event	Chicago, IL	1	231		
27	Andrew Everett and Trevor Lee	November 26, 2016	Windy City Classic	Chicago, IL	1	104		
—	Vacated	March 10, 2017	—	—	—	—	The championship was vacated due to lack of defenses.	
28	OI4K (Dave Crist and Jake Crist)	March 17, 2017	Homecoming	Berwyn, IL	4	50	OI4K defeated Scarlet and Graves (Dezmond Xavier and Zachary Wentz) to win the vacant championship.	
29	A. R. Fox and Rey Fenix	May 6, 2017	Take No Prisoners	Chicago, IL	1	70	Sami Callihan replaced Dave Crist in the match.	
30	Scarlet and Graves (Dezmond Xavier and Zachary Wentz)	July 15, 2017	United We Stand	Merrionette Park, IL	1	111	Jeff Cobb replaced Rey Fenix in the match.	
31	Besties in the World (Davey Vega and Mat Fitchett)	November 3, 2017	Hell Hath No Fury	Berwyn, IL	2	300		
32	Wrstling (David Starr, Eddie Kingston and Jeff Cobb)	August 30, 2018	Destination Chicago	Chicago, IL	1	57	Kingston and Starr won the match, but Jeff Cobb is also recognized as champion under the Freebird Rule.	
33	FireFox (A. R. Fox and Myron Reed)	October 26, 2018	Dia de los Luchadores	Merrionette Park, IL	1 (2, 1)	105		
34	The Lucha Brothers (Penta el 0M and Rey Fenix	February 8, 2019	Lucha City Limits	Austin, TX	1 (1, 2)	15		
35	Latin American Xchange (Ortiz and Santana)	February 23, 2019	The Art of War	Chicago, IL	1	187	This was a Triple threat tag team match, also involving FireFox (A. R. Fox and Myron Reed).	
36	Besties in the World (Davey Vega and Mat Fitchett)	August 29, 2019	Jim Lynam Memorial Tournament 2019 - Day 1	Chicago, IL	3	399	This was a Triple threat tag team match, also involving The Lucha Brothers (Penta el 0M and Rey Fenix).	
37	Ace Austin and Madman Fulton	October 1, 2020	Alive #1	Chicago, IL	1	233		
38	The Second Gear Crew (1 Called Manders and Matthew Justice)	May 22, 2021	Alive #10	Villa Park, IL	1	20		
39	inFAMy (Deonn Rusman and Joeasa)	June 11, 2021	Crush and Destroy	Merrionette Park, IL	1	83		
40	Jake Something and Stallion Rogers	September 2, 2021	AAW Destination Chicago	Chicago, IL	1	85	Beginning with October 30, 2021, Dante Leon filled in for an injured Rogers in title defenses, but was not recognized as official champion.	
41	Ace Perry and Alexander Hammerstone	November 26, 2021	Windy City Classic XVI	Merrionette Park, IL	1	231		
42	ACH and Jah-C	July 15, 2022	The Independents Day	Merrionette Park, IL	1	168		
—	Vacated	December 30, 2022	Unstoppable	Chicago, IL	—	—	Jah-C vacated the title.	
43	Hustle And Soul (Calvin Tankman and Jah-C)	December 30, 2022	Unstoppable	Chicago, IL	1 (1, 2)	105	Defeated The Rascalz (Trey Miguel and Zachary Wentz) to win the vacant titles.	
44	The Hellhounds (Russ Jones and Schaff)	April 14, 2023	Ring Of Fire	Berwyn, IL	1	315		
45	The Hustle And The Muscle (Karam and Rohit Raju)	February 23, 2024	AAW Legacy 20th Anniversary	Berwyn, IL	1	183		
46	The Hellhounds (Russ Jones and Schaff)	August 24, 2024	Face the Heat	Berwyn, IL	2	308		
47	Aaron Roberts and Joey Avalon	June 28, 2025	Crush & Destroy	Berwyn, IL	1	112		
48	The Good Brothers (Doc Gallows and Karl Anderson)	October 18, 2025	Defining Moment 2025	Berwyn, IL	1	69		
49	The Hellhounds (Russ Jones and Schaff)	December 26, 2025	Windy City Classic XX	Berwyn, IL	3	310+		

== Combined reigns ==
As of November 1, 2026.

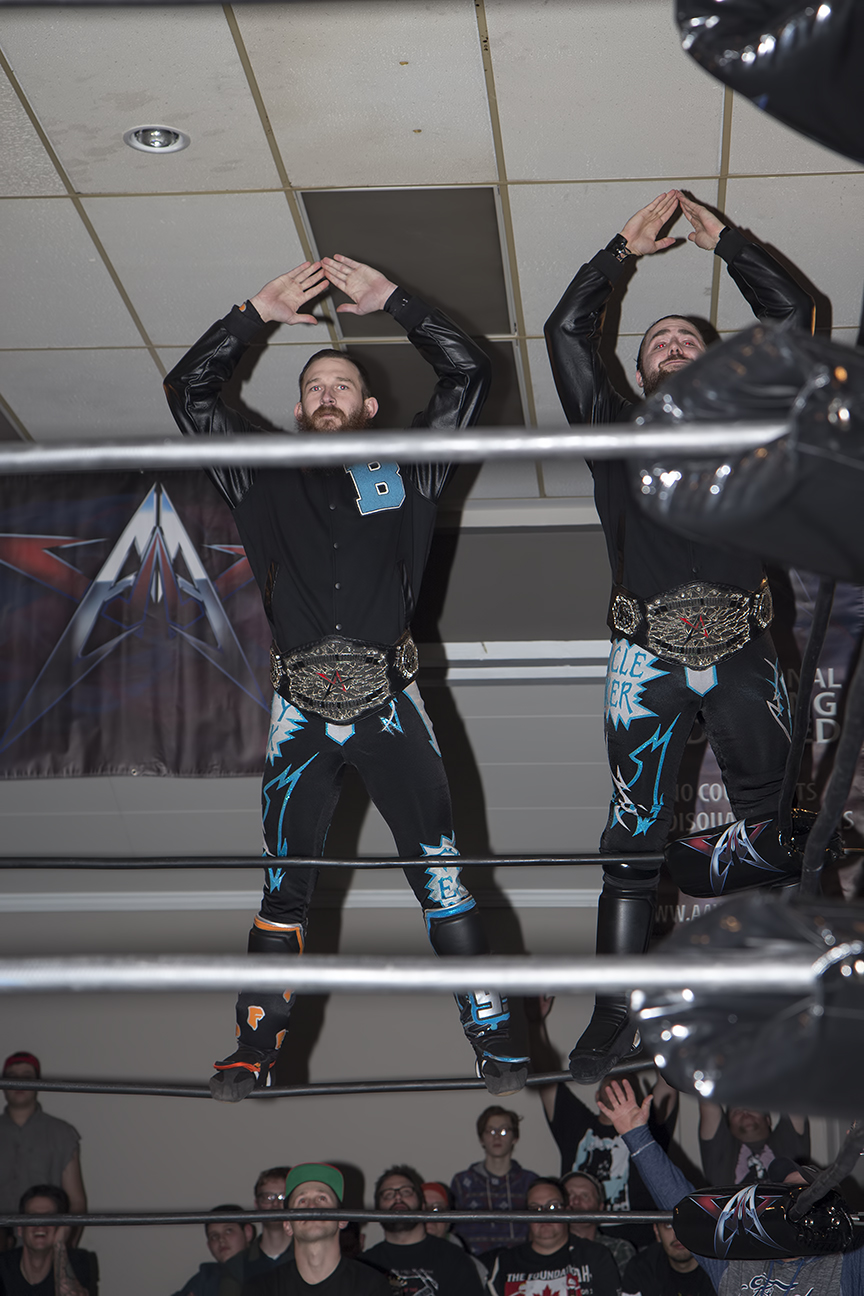
Three-time champions as a team, Besties in the World (Matt Fitchett (left) and Davey Vega (right).

=== By team ===
†	Indicates the current champions

Rank	Wrestler	No. of reigns	Combined days
1	The Hellhounds † (Russ Jones and Schaff)	3	933+
2	Besties in the World (Davey Vega and Mat Fitchett)	3	930
3	The Irish Airborne/OI4K (Dave Crist and Jake Crist)	4	616
4	The Gravediggers (Botch and Machine)	1	532
5	Arik Cannon and Jimmy Jacobs	1	302
6	The House of Truth (Christin Able and Josh Raymond)	2	280
7	Ethan Page and Michael Elgin	1	258
8	Zero Gravity (Brett Gakiya and CJ Esparza)	1	238
9	The North Star Express (Darin Corbin and Ryan Cruz)	2	237
10	Ace Austin and Madman Fulton	1	233
11	Ace Perry and Alexander Hammerstone	1	231
12	Jimmy Jacobs and Tyler Black	1	217
13	The Hooligans (Devin Cutter and Mason Cutter)	1	204
14	The Phoenix Twins (Dash Phoenix and Tweek Phoenix)	1	196
15	Latin American Xchange (Santana and Ortiz)	1	187
16	The Hustle And The Muscle (Karam and Rohit Raju)	1	183
17	Machine and Stu Early	1	175
18	ACH and Jah-C	1	168
19	The Michigan Invasion (N8 Mattson and Truth Martini)	1	161
20	Kung Fu Manchu (Louis Lyndon and Marion Fontaine)	1	154
21	Dan Lawrence and Ryan Boz	1	147
22	The Wet Bandits (Dan Lawrence and Markus Crane)	1	134
23	The Murder City Machine Guns (Alex Shelley and Chris Sabin)	1	133
24	Aaron Roberts and Joey Avalon	1	112
25	Scarlet and Graves (Dezmond Xavier and Zachary Wentz)	1	111
26	FireFox (A. R. Fox and Myron Reed)	1	105
26	Hustle and Soul (Calvin Tankman and Jah-C)	1	105
26	The Awesome Threesome (Jordan McEntyre and Knight Wagner)	1	105
29	Andrew Everett and Trevor Lee	1	104
30	Jake Something and Stallion Rogers	1	85
31	DP Associates Berwyn Branch (Conrad Kennedy III and Trik Davis)	1	84
32	inFAMy (Deonn Rusman and Joeasa)	1	83
33	Adrenaline Overdose (Bryce Benjamin and Shane Hollister)	1	77
34	A. R. Fox and Rey Fenix	1	70
35	The Good Brothers (Doc Gallows and Karl Anderson)	1	69
36	Krotch and Zach Gowen	1	63
37	Wrstling (David Starr, Eddie Kingston and Jeff Cobb)	1	57
38	The Black and The Brave (Marek Brave and Tyler Black)	1	49
39	The Second Gear Crew (1 Called Manders and Matthew Justice)	1	20
40	The Lucha Brothers (Penta el 0M and Rey Fenix)	1	15

=== By wrestler ===
Rank	Wrestler	No. of reigns	Combined days
1	Russ Jones †	3	933+
1	Schaff †	3	933+
3	Davey Vega	3	930
3	Mat Fitchett	3	930
5	Machine	2	707
6	Dave Crist	4	616
6	Jake Crist	4	616
8	Botch	1	532
9	Jimmy Jacobs	2	519
10	Arik Cannon	1	302
11	Dan Lawrence	2	281
12	Christin Able	2	280
12	Josh Raymond	2	280
14	Jah-C	2	273
15	Tyler Black	2	266
16	Ethan Page	1	258
16	Michael Elgin	1	258
18	Brett Gakiya	1	238
18	CJ Esparza	1	238
20	Darin Corbin	2	237
20	Ryan Cruz	2	237
22	Ace Austin	1	233
22	Madman Fulton	1	233
24	Ace Perry	1	231
24	Alexander Hammerstone	1	231
26	Devin Cutter	1	204
26	Mason Cutter	1	204
28	Dash Phoenix	1	196
28	Tweek Phoenix	1	196
30	Ortiz	1	187
30	Santana	1	187
32	Karam	1	183
32	Rohit Raju	1	183
34	A. R. Fox	2	175
34	Stu Early	1	175
36	ACH	1	168
37	N8 Mattson	1	161
37	Truth Martini	1	161
39	Louis Lyndon	1	154
39	Marion Fontaine	1	154
41	Ryan Boz	1	147
42	Markus Crane	1	134
43	Alex Shelley	1	133
43	Chris Sabin	1	133
45	Aaron Roberts	1	112
45	Joey Avalon	1	112
47	Dezmond Xavier	1	111
47	Zachary Wentz	1	111
49	Calvin Tankman	1	105
49	Jordan McEntyre	1	105
49	Knight Wagner	1	105
49	Myron Reed	1	105
53	Andrew Everett	1	104
53	Trevor Lee	1	104
55	Jake Something	1	86
55	Stallion Rogers	1	86
57	Rey Fenix	2	85
58	Conrad Kennedy III	1	84
58	Trik Davis	1	84
60	Deonn Rusman	1	83
60	Joeasa	1	83
62	Bryce Benjamin	1	77
62	Shane Hollister	1	77
64	Karl Anderson	1	69
64	Doc Gallows	1	69
66	Krotch	1	63
66	Zach Gowen	1	63
68	David Starr	1	57
68	Eddie Kingston	1	57
68	Jeff Cobb	1	57
71	Marek Brave	1	49
72	1 Called Manders	1	20
72	Matthew Justice	1	20
74	Penta el 0M	1	15

== See also ==
- AAW Heavyweight Championship
- AAW Heritage Championship
- AAW Women's Championship
