= AAW Wrestling =

Independent professional wrestling promotion

- Acronym: AAW
- Founded: 2004
- Style: Professional wrestling
- Headquarters: Merrionette Park, Illinois
- Owner: Danny Daniels
- Formerly: All American Wrestling
- Website: aawpro.com

AAW: Professional Wrestling Redefined, also known as AAW Wrestling and by the initialism of its original name, All American Wrestling, is an American independent professional wrestling promotion based in the Chicago area. It was founded in Berwyn, Illinois, in 2004 and has been owned by Danny Daniels since 2015.

For more than two decades AAW staged most of its shows at the Berwyn Eagles Club. The club stopped hosting wrestling in April 2026 after a fight at an event run by another promotion, and AAW moved its events to 115 Bourbon Street in Merrionette Park. Its recurring shows include Windy City Classic, Epic and Defining Moment, along with the Jim Lynam Memorial Tournament, named for the co-owner who ran the company with Daniels from 2005 until his death in 2015.

AAW promotes four championships: the AAW Heavyweight, Heritage, Tag Team and Women's championships.

== History ==
=== Founding and ownership ===
AAW ran its first show at the Berwyn Eagles Club in Berwyn, Illinois, in 2004 under the name All American Wrestling. The promotion began using the name AAW: Professional Wrestling Redefined in September 2005.

Tony Scarpone owned and ran AAW from its start in 2004 through May 2005, when Danny Daniels and Jim Lynam began running the company. Daniels and Lynam owned the promotion together until Lynam's death in 2015, after which Daniels became sole owner.

AAW has staged an annual tournament in Lynam's memory since 2016. Winners include Chris Hero (2016), Michael Elgin (2017), Sami Callihan (2018), Josh Alexander (2019), Mat Fitchett (2021), Gnarls Garvin (2022) and Mance Warner (2023).

=== Venues ===
Events were largely held at the Berwyn Eagles Club, a hall on West 26th Street, until 2015, when most shows moved to 115 Bourbon Street in Merrionette Park. In the later 2010s AAW also ran regularly at the Logan Square Auditorium in Chicago. The promotion returned to the Eagles Club full-time in 2021. AAW has also held events in Carpentersville, Highwood, Milan, Palatine, Arlington Heights and Pontiac in Illinois, and in Davenport and Donahue, Iowa.

In April 2026 the Berwyn Eagles Club said it would stop hosting wrestling after more than 20 years, following a fight between a fan and a wrestler at a March 28 event promoted by Ruthless Pro Wrestling. AAW's Crush & Destroy show on April 24, 2026, at which Seth Rollins made an unannounced appearance, was the promotion's last event at the venue. AAW producer Trent Zuberi called the club "a very accessible and affordable venue" and said the promotion had booked 115 Bourbon Street for future shows. The building was sold in July 2026 to José Tejada, owner of the neighboring Berwyn Auto Spa, who announced plans to convert it into an event space called Destino.

== Broadcasting ==
In August 2022 AAW signed an exclusive live-streaming agreement with Highspots.TV and became the first promotion to stream live on the service. The first show under the deal was Destination Chicago on September 1, 2022, at the Logan Square Auditorium in Chicago. Full events are also released on the promotion's YouTube channel.

== Championships ==
As of October 19, 2026, complete championship histories are available by clicking the links in the Championship column in the table below.

Championship	Current champion(s)	Reign	Date won	Days held	Location	Note	Ref.
AAW Heavyweight Championship	Joe Alonzo	1	May 22, 2026	150+	Merrionette Park, IL	Defeated Rafael Quintero at Homecoming.	
AAW Heritage Championship	Rafael Qunitero	1	August 22, 2026	58+	Merrionette Park, IL	Defeated Isaiah Moore, Amazonga and Richard Holliday at Unbreakable.	
AAW Tag Team Championship	The Hellhounds (Russ Jones & Schaff)	3 (3,3)	December 26, 2025	297+	Berwyn, IL	Defeated The Good Brothers (Doc Gallows & Karl Anderson) at Windy City Classic XX	
AAW Women's Championship	Maggie Lee	2	July 10, 2026	101+	Merrionette Park, IL	Defeated Heather Reckless at United We Stand 2026.	

== Roster ==
As of August 2026, AAW's roster consists of the following wrestlers and tag teams.

=== Wrestlers ===
Ring name	Notes
Ace Perry	
Amazanga	
Aminah Belmont	
Davey Vega	
Davina Thorne	
Donnovan Marcelous	
Hartenbower	
Heather Reckless	
Isaiah Moore	AAW Heritage Champion
Jake Crist	
Joe Alonzo	AAW Heavyweight Champion
Joey Avalon	
John E. Bravo	
Josh Bishop	
Maggie Lee	AAW Women's Champion
Mance Warner	
Mat Fitchett	
Rae Larson	
Rafael Quintero	
Ren Jones	
Rich Swann	
Robert Anthony	
Rory Shield	
Russ Jones	AAW Tag Team Champion
Ryan Matthias	
Sam Roberts	
Schaff	AAW Tag Team Champion
Sean Logan	
Sierra	
Solomon Tupu	
Stallion Rogers	
Stephen Wolf	
Trevor Lee	

=== Tag teams ===
Team	Members	Notes
The Hellhounds	Russ Jones and Schaff	AAW Tag Team Champions
Twist and Flip	Darren Fly and Nate Kobain	

== See also ==
- List of independent wrestling promotions in the United States
