= Premiere Wrestling Xperience =

Wrestling promotion in Pittsburgh

- Acronym: PWX
- Founded: 2003
- Style: Professional wrestling Sports entertainment
- Headquarters: North Carolina
- Owner: Brian Kanabroski
- Formerly: Carolina Wrestling Association (2003-2008); Premiere Wrestling Showcase (2008-2010)
- Website: pwxpro.com

Premiere Wrestling Xperience (PWX) is an American independent professional wrestling promotion that is based in Charlotte, North Carolina.

== History ==
Founded in 2003 as Carolina Wrestling Association, it was renamed in 2008 as Premiere Wrestling Showcase. Since 2010 it has been known as Premiere Wrestling Xperience.

== Current roster ==
Name:	Name:
Jon Davis	Ethan Case
Anthony Henry	The Heatseekers
TJ Boss	Montana Black
James D Drake	Wheeler Yuta
Suge D	Lucky Ali
Savannah Evans	Chip Day
Caleb Konely	Zane Riley
The Nameless Wrestler	Owen Knight
Keith Mack	Stuart Snodgrass
Logan Creed	Sir Rios Badu
Mad Dog Josh Powers	Patrick Scott
Drew Adler	Chance Rizer
Billy Brash	Mason Myles
Joshua Cutshall

== Alumni ==
Name:	Name:	Name:	Name:	Name:	Name:	Name:	Name:	Name:	Name:	
Cedric Alexander	Jerry Lawler	Lio Rush	Jimmy Rave	Matt Sydal	Delirious	A. R. Fox	Uhaa Nation	Lance Archer	Rob Killjoy	Davey Vega
Gunner	Mickie James	Rhett Titus	Sal Rinauro	Drew Galloway	Jade	Ricochet	AJ Styles	Timmy Lou Retton	Lance Lude	Mat Fitchett
Moose	Adam Cole	Amber O'Neal	Magnus	Kirby Mack	Colt Cabana	Caprice Coleman	Samoa Joe	Harry Smith Jr.	Corey Hollis	
The Irish Airborne	The Bravado Brothers	Reby Sky	Candice LeRae	Kenny King	Matt Striker	Trent Baretta	Lei'D Tapa	Trish Adora		
Kevin Owens	Adam Page	Kyle O'Reilly	Joey Ryan	Gregory Helms	Cheerleader Melissa	Jay Briscoe	Elijah Evans IV	Cam Carter		
Matt Hardy	Colby Corino	Davey Richards	Veda Scott	Bobby Lashley	Crazy Mary Dobson	Mark Briscoe	Big Swole	Chase Owens		
Marty Scurll	Drew Gulak	Eddie Edwards	P. J. Black	Tony Nese	A. C. H.	Mike Bennett	Harlem Bravado	El Phantasmo		
Roderick Strong	D. J. Hyde	Andrew Everett	Tessa Blanchard	Rich Swann	Jay Lethal	Maria Kanellis	Minoru Sazuki	Jushin Thunder Liger		
Michael Elgin	Gunner	Amanda Rodriguez	Trevor Lee	Lodi	Ivelisse Vélez	Angelina Love	Leon Ruff	Maxwell Jacob Friedman		
Tommaso Ciampa	Steve Corino	Lince Dorado	Chuck Taylor	Leva Bates	Shane Strickland	The Young Bucks	FinnJuice	John Skyler		
Zack Sabre Jr	Chris Hero	Martin Stone	Dalton Castle	Matthew Riddle	Jimmy Jacobs	Luke Gallows	Robbie Eagles	Brian Pillman Jr.		

== Current champions ==
Championship:	Champion(s):	Previous:	Date won:	Location:
PWX Heavyweight Championship	Jon Davis	TJ Boss	July 24, 2021	Concord, North Carolina
PWX Innovative Television Championship	Lucky Ali	Cam Carter	March 20, 2021	Rock Hill, South Carolina
PWX World Tag Team Championship	The Heatseekers (Sigmon & Elliott)	The Revolt! (Kaleb Konely & Zane Riley)	March 20, 2021	Rock Hill, South Carolina

== Tournaments ==
Accomplishment:	Latest winner(s):	Date won:	Location:
X-16 2015	Ethan Case	September 9–10, 2015	Winston-Salem, North Carolina
X-16 2016	Anthony Henry	November 19–20, 2016	Charlotte, North Carolina
X-16 2018	James Drake	January 13–14, 2018	Concord & Charlotte, North Carolina
X-16 2019	Slim J	January 19–20, 2019	Concord, North Carolina
X-16 2020	Harlem Bravado	January 18–19, 2020	Concord, North Carolina
X-16 2021	TJ Boss	January 16, 2021	Rock Hill, South Carolina

== PWX Pure ==
PWX Pure is a developmental promotion founded and run by PWX. Shows are monthly at Hebron Hall in Charlotte, NC. Cam Carter is the first PWX Pure champion, having won an 8-person tournament.

== PWX Pure Champions ==
Champion(s):	Previous:	Date won:	Event:	Location:
Cam Carter	Yahya	March 9, 2019	Pure Eleven	Charlotte, North Carolina
Yahya	Cam Carter	July 14, 2019	Pure Fifteen	Charlotte, North Carolina
Suge D	Yahya	January 11, 2020	Pure Twenty	Charlotte, North Carolina
Savannah Evans	Suge D	April 17, 2021	What Lies Beneath	Rock Hill, South Carolina
Suge D	Savannah Evans	August 23, 2021	Battlefield X 2021	Gastonia, North Carolina
