= AAW Heavyweight Championship =

Professional wrestling championship

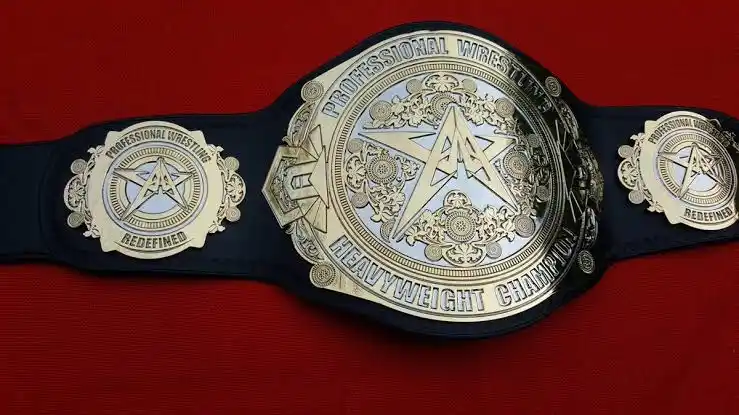

Details
- Promotion: AAW Wrestling
- Date established: 2005
- Current champion: Joe Alonzo
- Date won: May 22, 2026
Statistics
- First champion: Tony Scarpone
- Most reigns: Sami Callihan (3 reigns)
- Longest reign: Mance Warner (559 days)
- Shortest reign: Kevin Steen and Rafael Quintero (28 days)

The AAW Heavyweight Championship is a professional wrestling world heavyweight championship owned and promoted by AAW Wrestling. There have been a total of 39 reigns and one vacancy shared between 32 different champions. The current champion is Joe Alonzo, who is in his first reign.

== Title history ==
Key
| No. | Overall reign number |
| Reign | Reign number for the specific champion |
| Days | Number of days held |
| + | Current reign is changing daily |

| No. | Champion | Championship change | | | Reign statistics | | Notes | Ref. |
| No. | Champion | Date | Event | Location | Reign | Days | Notes | Ref. |
|---|---|---|---|---|---|---|---|---|
| 1 | Tony Scarpone | 2005 | N/A | Berwyn, IL | 1 | N/A | It is unknown how Scarpone was billed as the inaugural champion therefore the length of the reign is uncertain. | |
| 2 | Robert Anthony | July 9, 2005 | Scars and Stripes | Berwyn, IL | 1 | 140 | Anthony defeated Tony Scarpone in a Last Man Standing match. | |
| 3 | Mike Venom | November 26, 2005 | Windy City Classic | Berwyn, IL | 1 | 119 | | |
| — | Vacated | March 25, 2006 | — | Berwyn, IL | — | — | Mike Venom was stripped of the championship. | |
| 4 | Tyler Black | March 25, 2006 | Final Four | Berwyn, IL | 1 | 245 | Black defeated Eric Priest, Danny Daniels and Silas Young in a Four Corners Match to win the vacant championship | |
| 5 | Marek Brave | November 25, 2006 | Windy City Classic II | Berwyn, IL | 1 | 175 | This was a No Ropes Barbed Wire match. | |
| 6 | Jerry Lynn | May 19, 2007 | Defining Moment | Berwyn, IL | 1 | 420 | This was a Best Two out of Three falls match | |
| 7 | Tyler Black | July 12, 2008 | Scars and Stripes | Berwyn, IL | 2 | 259 | | |
| 8 | Jay Bradley | March 28, 2009 | 5th Year Anniversary Show | Berwyn, IL | 1 | 161 | This was Final Four Elimination match which also involved Chandler McClure and Egotistico Fantastico. | |
| 9 | Jimmy Jacobs | September 5, 2009 | Us vs. Them | Berwyn, IL | 1 | 84 | | |
| 10 | Silas Young | November 28, 2009 | Windy City Classic V | Berwyn, IL | 1 | 469 | This was a Three Way Elimination match which also involved Shane Hollister. | |
| 11 | Dan Lawrence | March 12, 2011 | 7th Anniversary | Berwyn, IL | 1 | 133 | | |
| 12 | Silas Young | July 23, 2011 | Scars and Stripes | Berwyn, IL | 2 | 426 | | |
| 13 | Michael Elgin | September 21, 2012 | Defining Moment | Berwyn, IL | 1 | 280 | | |
| 14 | Shane Hollister | June 28, 2013 | Bound By Hate | Berwyn, IL | 1 | 155 | | |
| 15 | Kevin Steen | November 30, 2013 | Windy City Classic | Berwyn, IL | 1 | 28 | | |
| 16 | Shane Hollister | December 28, 2013 | One Twisted Christmas | Berwyn, IL | 2 | 258 | | |
| 17 | Eddie Kingston | September 12, 2014 | Defining Moment | Berwyn, IL | 1 | 231 | | |
| 18 | Josh Alexander | May 1, 2015 | Take No Prisoners | Merrionette Park, IL | 1 | 50 | This was a three-way match, also involving Samoa Joe. | |
| 19 | Ethan Page | June 20, 2015 | Vanguard the Uprising | Berwyn, IL | 1 | 161 | Page defeated Josh Alexander after attacking him the night before at a separate AAW event. | |
| 20 | Eddie Kingston | November 28, 2015 | Windy City Classic XI | Chicago, IL | 2 | 83 | This was a three-way match, also involving Trevor Lee. | |
| 21 | Sami Callihan | February 19, 2016 | The Art of War | Merrionette Park, IL | 1 | 155 | | |
| 22 | Pentagón Jr. | July 23, 2016 | United We Stand | Merrionette Park, IL | 1 | 77 | | |
| 23 | Sami Callihan | October 8, 2016 | Jim Lynam Memorial Tournament - Day 2 | Merrionette Park, IL | 2 | 327 | This was a Lucha de Apuestas tag team match between Callihan (hair) and Jake Crist (career) vs Fénix (mask) and Pentagón Jr. (title). Callihan pinned Pentagón to win the championship. | |
| 24 | Rey Fénix | August 31, 2017 | Defining Moment | Berwyn, IL | 1 | 156 | This was a Lucha de Apuestas, where Fenix wagered his mask. | |
| 25 | A. C. H. | February 3, 2018 | The Chaos Theory | LaSalle, IL | 1 | 209 | | |
| 26 | Brody King | August 31, 2018 | Defining Moment | Chicago, IL | 1 | 120 | | |
| 27 | Sami Callihan | December 29, 2018 | Windy City Classic XIV | Merrionette Park, IL | 3 | 273 | This was a steel cage match. | |
| 28 | Josh Alexander | September 28, 2019 | Defining Moment | Chicago, IL | 2 | 91 | | |
| 29 | Mance Warner | December 28, 2019 | Windy City Classic XV | Merrionette Park, IL | 1 | 559 | | |
| 30 | Fred Yehi | July 9, 2021 | United We Stand | Merrionette Park, IL | 1 | 140 | | |
| 31 | Mat Fitchett | November 26, 2021 | Windy City Classic XVI | Merrionette Park, IL | 1 | 279 | | |
| 32 | Jake Something | September 1, 2022 | Destination Chicago | Chicago, IL | 1 | 364 | | |
| 33 | Davey Vega | August 31, 2023 | The Art of War 2023 | Berwyn, IL | 1 | 282 | | |
| 34 | Gnarls Garvin | June 8, 2024 | Day of Defiance 2024 | Berwyn, IL | 1 | 203 | | |
| 35 | Matt Riddle | December 28, 2024 | Windy City Classic XIX | Berwyn, IL | 1 | 34 | | |
| 36 | Ren Jones | January 31, 2025 | Chi-Town Rumble | Berwyn, IL | 1 | 190 | | |
| 37 | Trevor Lee | August 9, 2025 | Take No Prisoners | Berwyn, IL | 1 | 258 | This was a triple threat match also involving Rafael Quintero. | |
| 38 | Rafael Quintero | April 24, 2026 | Crush & Destroy | Berwyn, IL | 1 | 28 | | |
| 39 | Joe Alonzo | May 22, 2026 | Homecoming | Merrionette Park, IL | 1 | 175+ | | |

== Combined reigns ==
As of November 13, 2026.

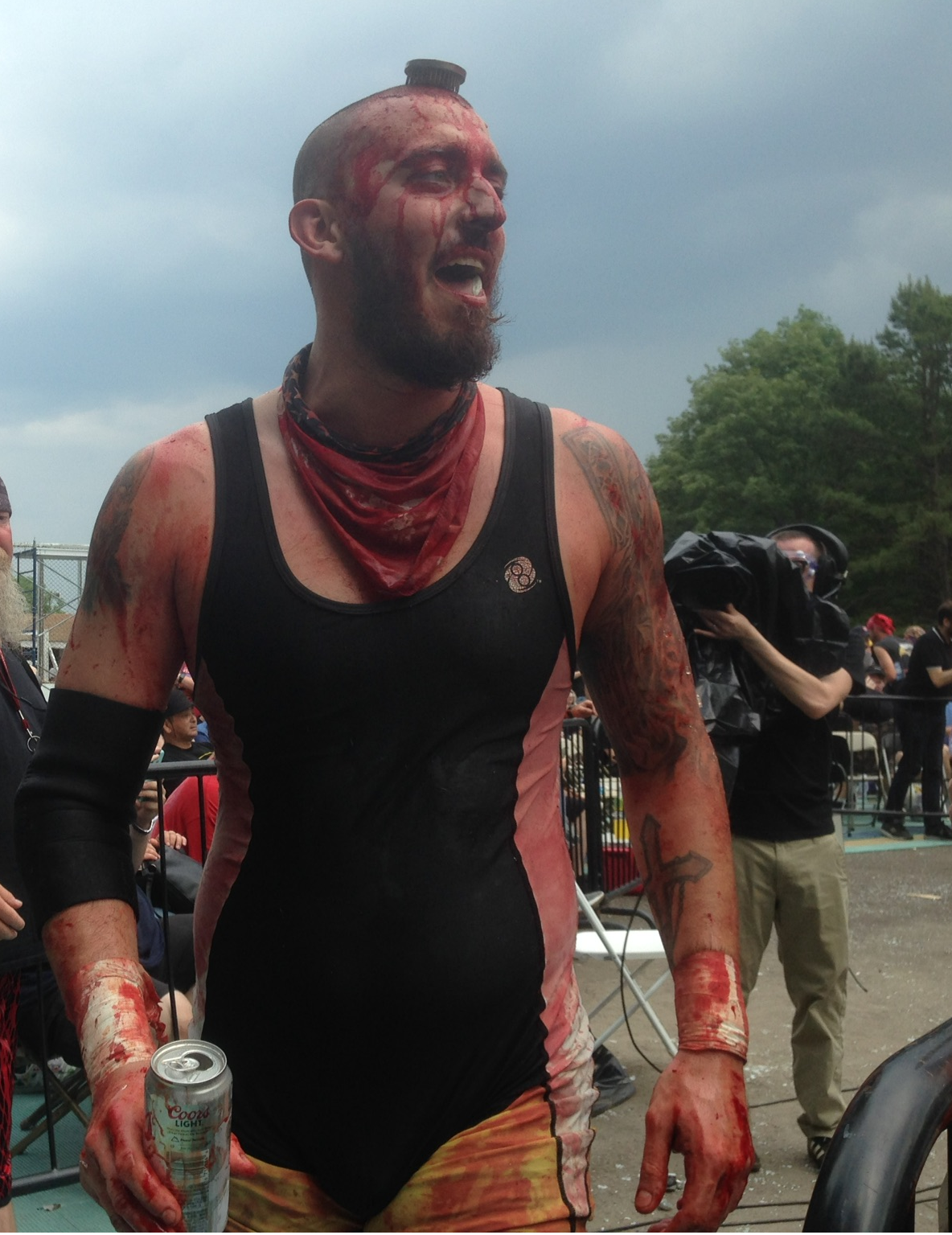
Record longest reigning champion, Mance Warner

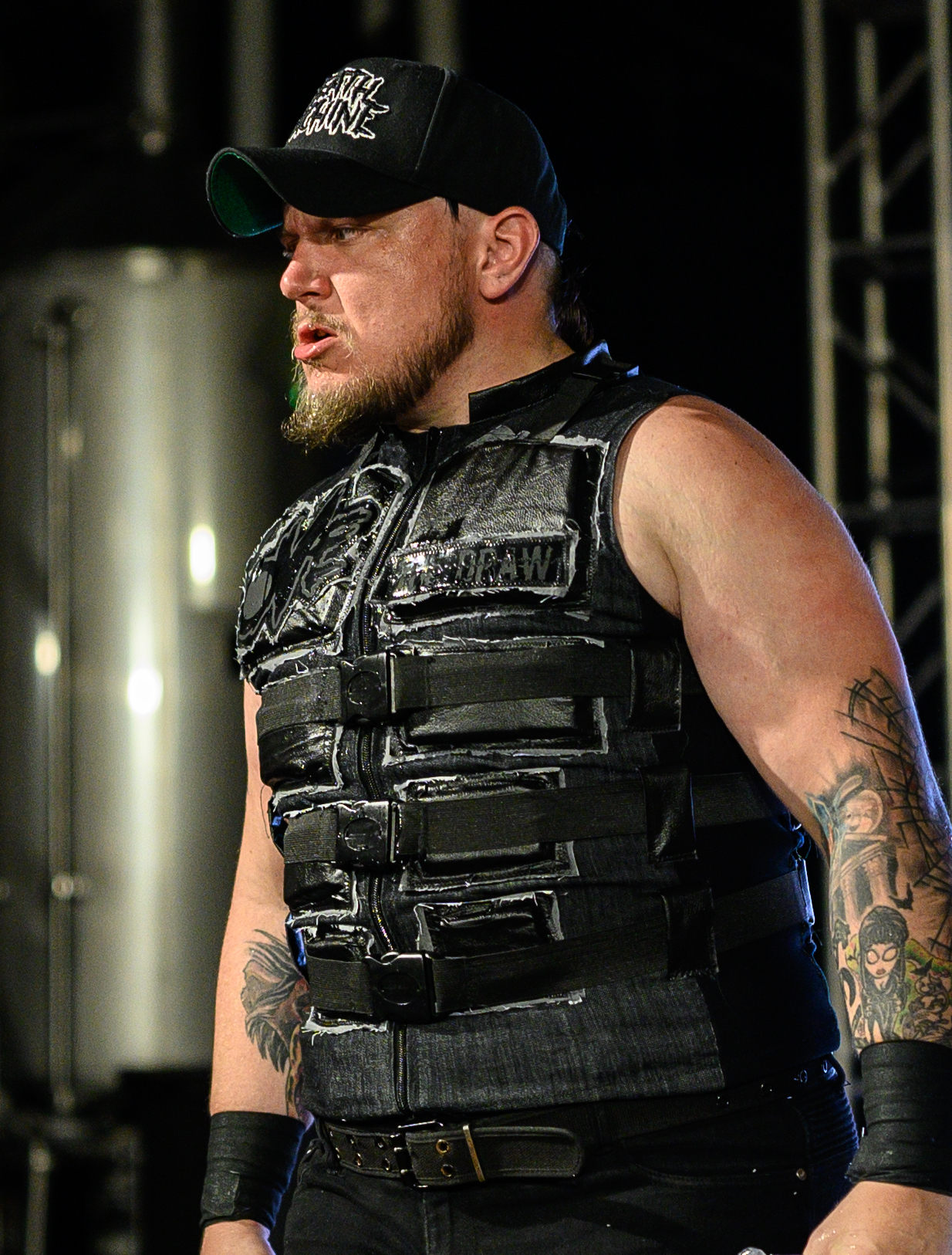
Sami Callihan records most reigns at three.

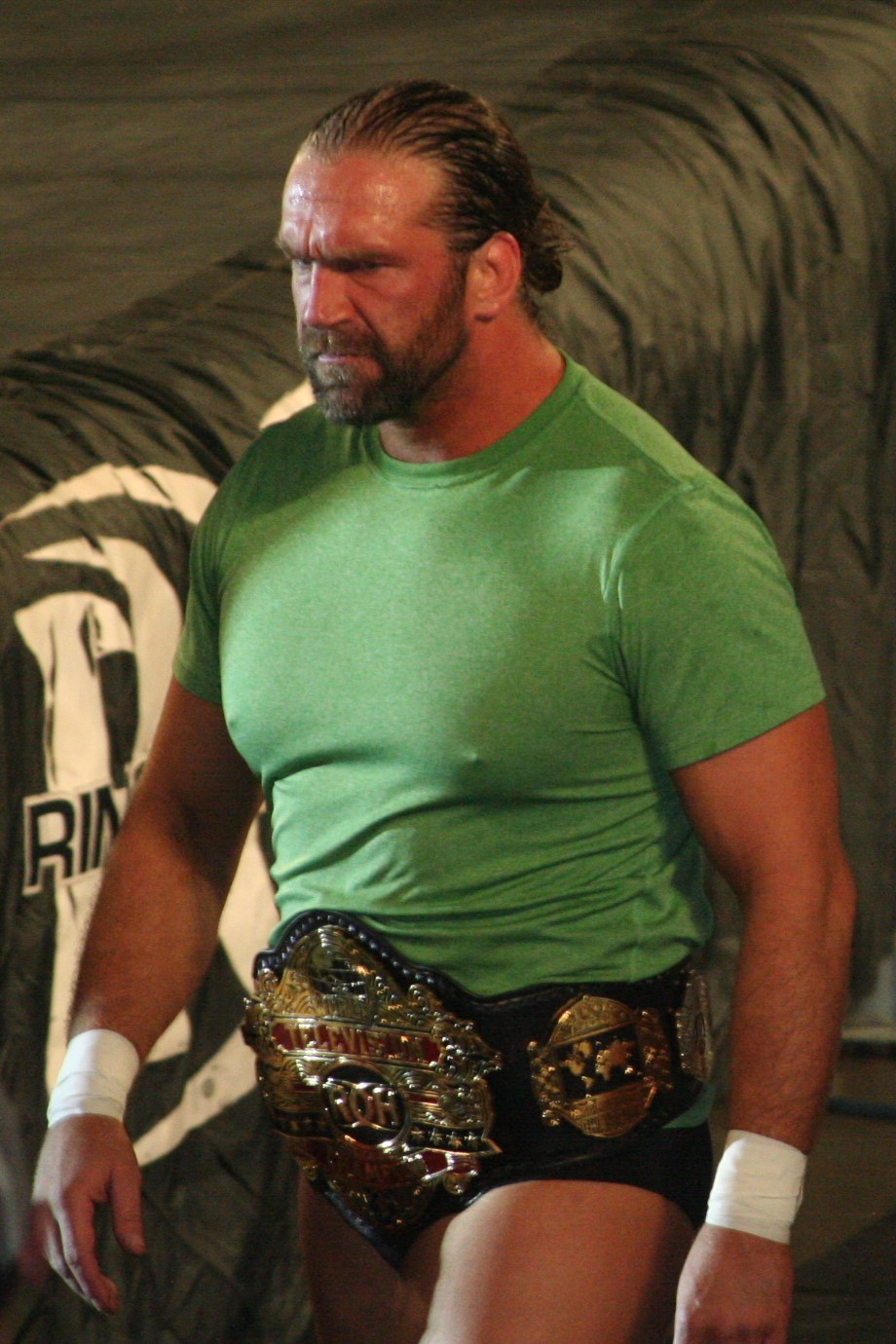
Silas Young, record longest combined reigns at 895 days

| † | Indicates the current champion |
| ¤ | The exact length of the title reign is uncertain. |

| Rank | Wrestler | No. of reigns | Combined days |
|---|---|---|---|
| 1 | Silas Young | 2 | 895 |
| 2 | Sami Callihan | 3 | 755 |
| 3 | Mance Warner | 1 | 559 |
| 4 | Tyler Black | 2 | 504 |
| 5 | Jerry Lynn | 1 | 420 |
| 6 | Shane Hollister | 2 | 413 |
| 7 | Jake Something | 1 | 364 |
| 8 | Eddie Kingston | 2 | 314 |
| 9 | Davey Vega | 1 | 282 |
| 10 | Michael Elgin | 1 | 280 |
| 11 | Mat Fitchett | 1 | 279 |
| 12 | Trevor Lee | 1 | 258 |
| 13 | A. C. H. | 1 | 209 |
| 14 | Gnarls Garvin | 1 | 203 |
| 15 | Ren Jones | 1 | 190 |
| 16 | Joe Alonzo † | 1 | 175+ |
| 17 | Marek Brave | 1 | 175 |
| 18 | Ethan Page | 1 | 161 |
| 18 | Jay Bradley | 1 | 161 |
| 20 | Rey Fenix | 1 | 156 |
| 21 | Josh Alexander | 2 | 141 |
| 22 | Fred Yehi | 1 | 140 |
| 22 | Robert Anthony | 1 | 140 |
| 24 | Dan Lawrence | 1 | 133 |
| 25 | Brody King | 1 | 120 |
| 26 | Mike Venom | 1 | 119 |
| 27 | Jimmy Jacobs | 1 | 84 |
| 28 | Pentagón Jr. | 1 | 77 |
| 29 | Matt Riddle | 1 | 34 |
| 30 | Rafael Quintero | 1 | 28 |
| 30 | Kevin Steen | 1 | 28 |
| 32 | Tony Scarpone | 1 | ¤N/A |

== See also ==
- AAW Heritage Championship
- AAW Tag Team Championship
- AAW Women's Championship
