= AAW Heritage Championship =

Professional wrestling championship

Details
- Promotion: All American Wrestling
- Date established: December 17, 2005
- Current champion: Rafael Quintero
- Date won: August 22, 2026

Other names
- AAW Cruiserweight Championship (2005–2006); AAW Heritage Championship (2006–present)
Statistics
- First champion: Dan Lawrence
- Most reigns: A. C. H., Ace Austin, Arik Cannon, DJZ, Jimmy Jacobs, Davey Vega and Hakim Zane (2 reigns)
- Longest reign: Hakim Zane (462 days)
- Shortest reign: Ace Austin and Hartenbower (<1 day)

The AAW Heritage Championship (previously known as AAW Cruiserweight Championship) is a professional wrestling championship created and promoted by the American professional wrestling promotion All American Wrestling.

== Title history ==
As of November 21, 2026, there have been a total of 40 reigns and 1 vacancy shared between 33 different wrestlers. The inaugural champion was Dan Lawrence. The current champion is Rafael Qunitero, who is in his first reign. He defeated then-champion Isaiah Moore, Amazonga and Richard Holliday in a four-way elimination match on August 22, 2026, at Unbreakable in Merrionette Park, Illinois.

Key
No.	Overall reign number
Reign	Reign number for the specific champion
Days	Number of days held
+	Current reign is changing daily

No.	Champion	Championship change			Reign statistics		Notes	Ref.
No.	Champion	Date	Event	Location	Reign	Days	Notes	Ref.
1	Dan Lawrence	N/A	N/A	N/A	1	N/A	Billed as the first-ever champion. The circumstances under which he won the title and the length of the reign are unknown.	
2	Danny Daniels	December 17, 2005	Hardcore Holiday	Berwyn, IL	1	147	Daniels defeated Dan Lawrence in an "I quit" match. Renamed AAW Heritage Championship on January 14, 2006.	
3	Silas Young	May 13, 2006	Point of No Return	Berwyn, IL	1	133		
4	Jimmy Jacobs	September 23, 2006	Day of Reckoning	Berwyn, IL	1	168		
5	Eric Priest	March 10, 2007	3rd Anniversary Show	Berwyn, IL	1	336		
6	Jimmy Jacobs	February 9, 2008	My Bloody Valentine	Berwyn, IL	2	133	This was a dog collar chain match	
7	Krotch	June 21, 2008	Point of No Return	Berwyn, IL	1	77		
8	Arik Cannon	September 6, 2008	Hostile Intentions	Berwyn, IL	1	448		
9	Colt Cabana	November 28, 2009	Windy City Classic	Berwyn, IL	1	91		
10	Arik Cannon	February 27, 2010	My Bloody Valentine	Berwyn, IL	2	209		
11	Shane Hollister	September 24, 2010	Defining Moment	Berwyn, IL	1	204		
12	Mason Beck	April 16, 2011	Point of No Return	Berwyn, IL	1	195		
13	Michael Elgin	October 28, 2011	War is Coming	Merrionette Park, IL	1	406		
—	Vacated	December 7, 2012	—	—	—	—	The championship was vacated due to Michael Elgin winning the AAW Heavyweight Championship.	
14	A. C. H.	March 1, 2013	Path of Redemption	Merrionette Park, IL	1	274	A. C. H. defeated Samuray del Sol in the finals of a tournament to win the vacant championship.	
15	Matt Cage	November 30, 2013	Windy City Classic IX	Berwyn, IL	1	258		
16	Heidi Lovelace	August 15, 2014	All Hail	Berwyn, IL	1	84	This title marks the first time a woman has held the championship. It also marks the first time a woman has held any championship in AAW.	
17	Christian Faith	November 7, 2014	A Monster's Rage	Merrionette Park, IL	1	224		
18	Louis Lyndon	June 19, 2015	Killers Among Us	Merrionette Park, IL	1	190		
19	Davey Vega	December 26, 2015	Unstoppable	Merrionette Park, IL	1	20		
20	A. R. Fox	January 15, 2016	The Chaos Theory	Merrionette Park, IL	1	350		
21	A. C. H.	December 30, 2016	Unstoppable	Merrionette Park, IL	2	77		
22	Penta el 0M	March 17, 2017	Homecoming	Berwyn, IL	1	253		
23	Zema Ion	November 25, 2017	Unstoppable	Chicago, IL	1	84		
24	Trevor Lee	February 17, 2018	Showdown	Chicago, IL	1	294	This was a WRSTLING Rules Match.	
25	DJ Z	December 8, 2018	Last Call	LaSalle, IL	2	125	Previously known as Zema Ion	
26	Maxwell Jacob Friedman	April 12, 2019	EPIC 2019: The 15th Anniversary Show	Merrionette Park, IL	1	29		
27	Jake Something	May 11, 2019	Take No Prisoners	Chicago, IL	1	203		
28	Paco	November 30, 2019	Unstoppable 2019	Chicago, IL	1	28		
29	Hakim Zane	December 28, 2019	Windy City Classic XV	Merrionette Park, IL	1	462		
30	Myron Reed	April 3, 2021	AAW Alive #6	Villa Park, IL	1	152		
31	Ace Austin	September 2, 2021	AAW Destination Chicago	Chicago, IL	1	<1		
32	Hakim Zane	September 2, 2021	AAW Destination Chicago	Chicago, IL	2	119		
33	Ace Austin	December 30, 2021	Unosstopable	Chicago, IL	2	245	This was a three-way match which involves Myron Reed	
34	Davey Vega	September 1, 2022	Destination Chicago	Chicago, IL	2	422		
35	Hartenbower	October 28, 2023	Unstoppable	Berwyn, IL	1	<1	Hartenbower performed a Fingerpoke of Doom to acquire the title from his stable-mate Vega	
36	Levi Everett	October 28, 2023	Unstoppable	Berwyn, IL	1	118		
37	Joe Alonzo	February 23, 2024	Legacy - The 20th Anniversary Event	Berwyn, IL	1	371		
38	Robert Anthony	February 28, 2025	Epic - The 21st Anniversary Event	Berwyn, IL	1	197		
39	Isaiah Moore	September 13, 2025	A Bond of Hate	Berwyn, IL	1	343		
40	Rafael Quintero	August 22, 2026	Unbreakable	Merrionette Park, IL	1	91+	This was a four-way elimination match also involving Amazonga and Richard Holliday.	

== Combined reigns ==
As of November 21, 2026

†	Indicates the current champions
¤	The exact length of at least one title reign is uncertain, so the shortest length is considered.

Rank	Wrestler	No. of reigns	Combined days
1	Arik Cannon	2	657
2	Hakim Zane	2	581
3	Davey Vega	2	442
4	Michael Elgin	1	406
5	Joe Alonzo	1	371
6	A. C. H.	2	351
7	A. R. Fox	1	350
8	Isaiah Moore	1	343
9	Eric Priest	1	336
10	Jimmy Jacobs	2	301
11	Trevor Lee	1	294
12	Matt Cage	1	258
13	Penta el 0M	1	253
14	Ace Austin	2	245
15	Christian Faith	1	224
16	DJ Z/Zema Ion	2	209
17	Shane Hollister	1	204
18	Jake Something	1	203
19	Robert Anthony	1	197
20	Mason Beck	1	195
21	Louis Lyndon	1	190
22	Myron Reed	1	152
23	Danny Daniels	1	147
24	Silas Young	1	133
25	Levi Everett	1	118
26	Rafael Quintero †	1	91+
27	Colt Cabana	1	91
28	Heidi Lovelace	1	84
29	Krotch	1	77
30	Maxwell Jacob Friedman	1	29
31	Paco	1	28
32	Hartenbower	1	<1
33	Dan Lawrence	1	¤N/A

== See also ==
- AAW Heavyweight Championship
- AAW Tag Team Championship
- AAW Women's Championship
