= Joe Alonzo =

American professional wrestler

Personal information
- Born: March 25, 1997 (age 29) Oak Lawn, Illinois, U.S.

Professional wrestling career
- Ring names: Joe Alonzo; Alonzo
- Billed weight: 231 lb (105 kg)
- Billed from: Chicago, Illinois
- Trained by: Mustafa Ali; Robert Anthony; Ricky Marvin
- Debut: 2016

Joe Alonzo (born March 25, 1997) is an American professional wrestler. He is signed to Total Nonstop Action Wrestling (TNA). He also performs on the independent circuit.

== Professional wrestling career ==
=== Independent circuit (2016–present) ===
On November 26, 2016, Joe Alonzo made his professional wrestling debut at Pro Wrestling Blitz's Ring Wars event in Joliet, Illinois in which he and Humec challenged Mason Beck and Ruff Crossing for the Blitz Tag Team Championship. On December 17, 2016, Alonzo competed in a battle royal which featured Quinn Whittock, Steven Flowe, and Aiden O'Shea. On May 6, 2017, Alonzo competed in a battle royal for the GPW Battle Royal Championship during Global Professional Wrestling's (GPW) Global 4 event. On October 15, 2017, Alonzo made his international wrestling debut when he fought Jimmy, Cobre, Drastik Boy, and Lokillo at a Desastre Total Ultraviolento (DTU) event in Ecatepec de Morelos, Mexico.

On September 3, 2022, Alonzo challenged Cyon for the NWA National Championship during the pre-show for the Wrestling Showcase pay-per-view in Schaumburg, Illinois.

=== National Wrestling Alliance (2022–2024) ===
On April 30, 2022 Joe Alonzo made his National Wrestling Alliance (NWA) debut during the promotion's PowerrrTrip 2 event which aired on May 24, 2022 as an episode of NWA Powerrr. During the show, Alonzo fought against Cyon. On the September 24, 2022 episode of NWA USA, Alonzo competed in a six-way scramble match to determine the #1 contender for the NWA World Junior Heavyweight Championship which featured Colby Corino, Kerry Morton, Mike Bennett, Peter Avalon, and PJ Hawx.

On December 6, 2022 during the Champions Series event, Alonzo competed in the Champions Series tournament, advancing to the second round despite losing to Mercurio. Alonzo also competed in a six-man tag team match as part of the second round of the tournament in which he teamed with Odinson and Colby Corino against Silas Mason, EC3, and Carnage.

On the March 28, 2023 episode of NWA Powerrr, Alonzo defeated Alex Taylor to become the #1 contender for the NWA World Junior Heavyweight Championship. However, on the NWA 312 pay-per-view, Alonzo would lose to defending champion Kerry Morton. On August 27, 2023 during the second night of the NWA 75 pay-per-view, Alonzo competed in a battle royal to determine the #1 contender for the NWA National Championship. On March 2, 2024 during the Hard Times event, Alonzo won the NWA World Junior Heavyweight Championship after defeating Colby Corino. On June 28, 2024 during NWA Chicago's Endless Summer event, Alonzo lost the NWA World Junior Heavyweight Championship to Alex Taylor.

=== Total Nonstop Action Wrestling (2025–present) ===
On the March 28, 2025 episode of Xplosion Joe Alonzo made his Total Nonstop Action Wrestling (TNA) debut at the El Paso County Coliseum in El Paso, Texas when he fought Steve Maclin. Alonzo would also fight against Trey Miguel on the May 9, 2025 episode of Xplosion which was taped during the Unbreakable pay-per-view.

On August 22, 2026, TNA and AAW Wrestling announced that Alonzo would defend the AAW Heavyweight Championship against the Home Town Man in a dark match on August 23, 2026 during the Lockdown pay-per-view with the stipulation that he would be signed to TNA if he retains the title; Alonzo won the match and thus received a TNA contract.

== Championships and accomplishments ==
- 4th Rope Wrestling
  - 4th Rope Heavyweight Championship ( 1 time)
- Berwyn Championship Wrestling
  - BCW Heavyweight Championship (1 time)
- Gulf Coast Wrestling Alliance
  - GCWA Lucha Libre Championship (1 time)
  - GCWA Heavyweight Championship (1 time, current)
- National Wrestling Alliance
  - NWA World Junior Heavyweight Championship (1 time)
- AAW Wrestling
  - AAW Heritage Championship (1 time)
  - AAW Heavyweight Championship (1 time, current)
