= Evolve Tag Team Championship =

Professional wrestling tag team championship

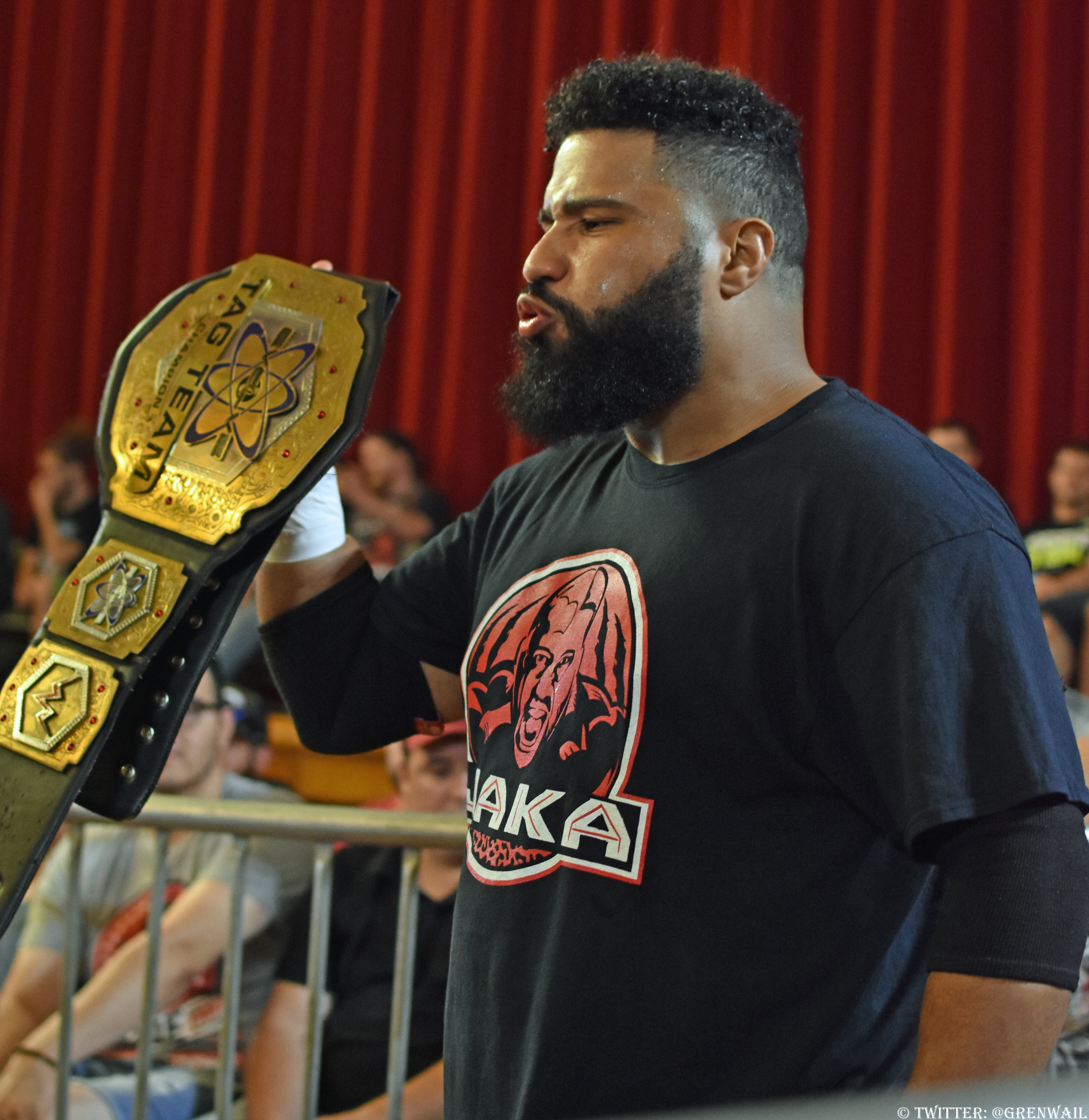
- Jaka holding the Evolve Tag Team Championship in August 2018.

Details
- Promotion: Evolve
- Date established: November 10, 2015
- Date retired: July 2, 2020
Statistics
- First champions: Drew Galloway and Johnny Gargano
- Final champion: The Besties in the World (Davey Vega and Mat Fitchett)
- Most reigns: (as a team) Catch Point/Doom Patrol (Chris Dickinson and Jaka) (2 reigns) (as an individual) Chris Dickinson, Drew Galloway, Jaka and Tracy Williams (2 reigns)
- Longest reign: Doom Patrol (Chris Dickinson and Jaka) (373 days)
- Shortest reign: The Troll Boyz (A. C. H. and Ethan Page) (1 days)
- Oldest champion: Eddie Kingston (37 years)
- Youngest champion: Leon Ruff (23 years)
- Heaviest champion: Angelo Dawkins (282 lb (128 kg))
- Lightest champion: Johnny Gargano (190 lb (86 kg))

The Evolve Tag Team Championship was a professional wrestling tag team championship owned by the Evolve promotion. The inaugural champions were crowned on January 24, 2016, at the end of an eight-team tournament.

Like most professional wrestling championships, the title was won as a result of a scripted match. There have been 13 reigns shared among 12 teams and 21 wrestlers.

== History ==
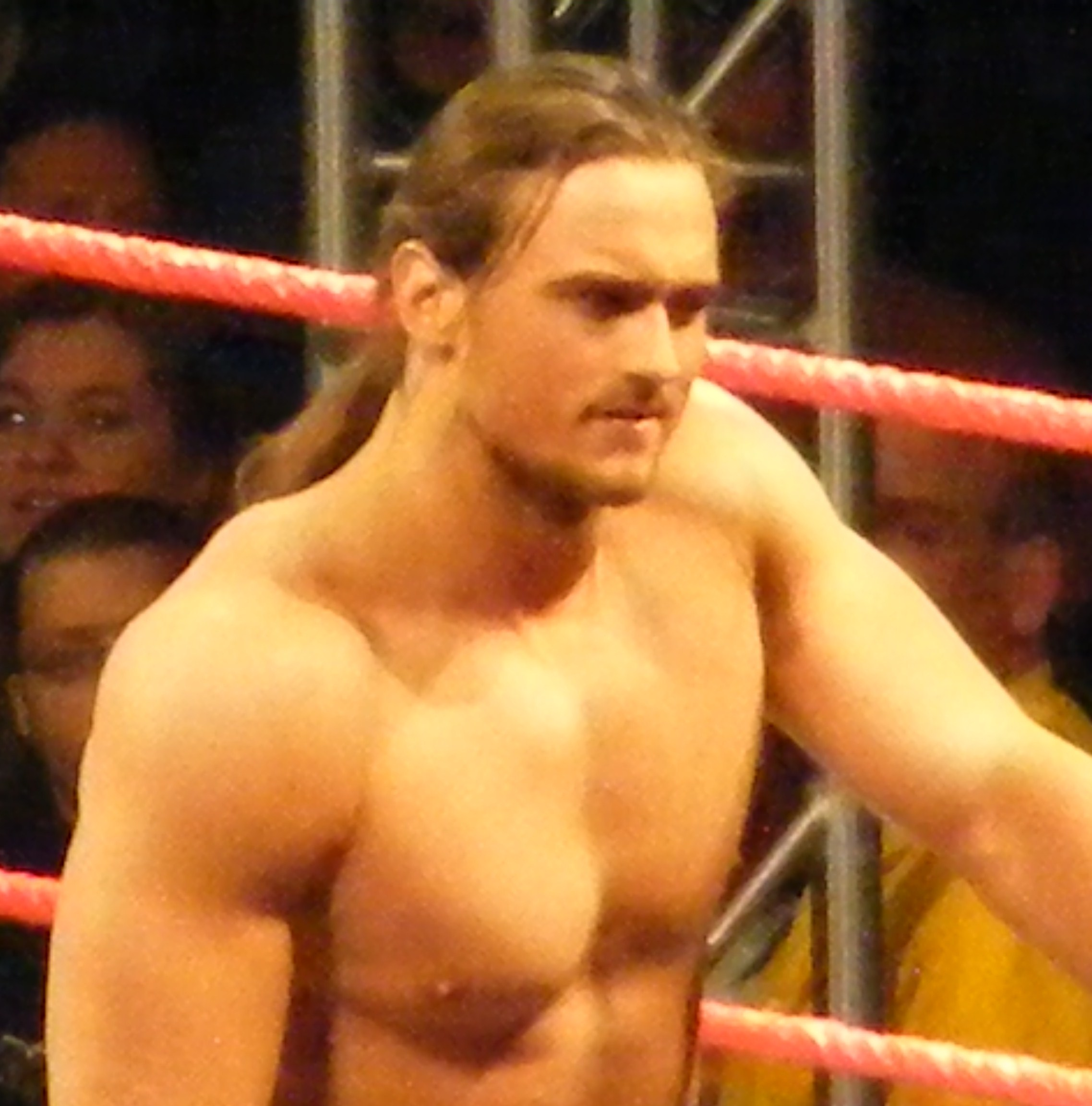
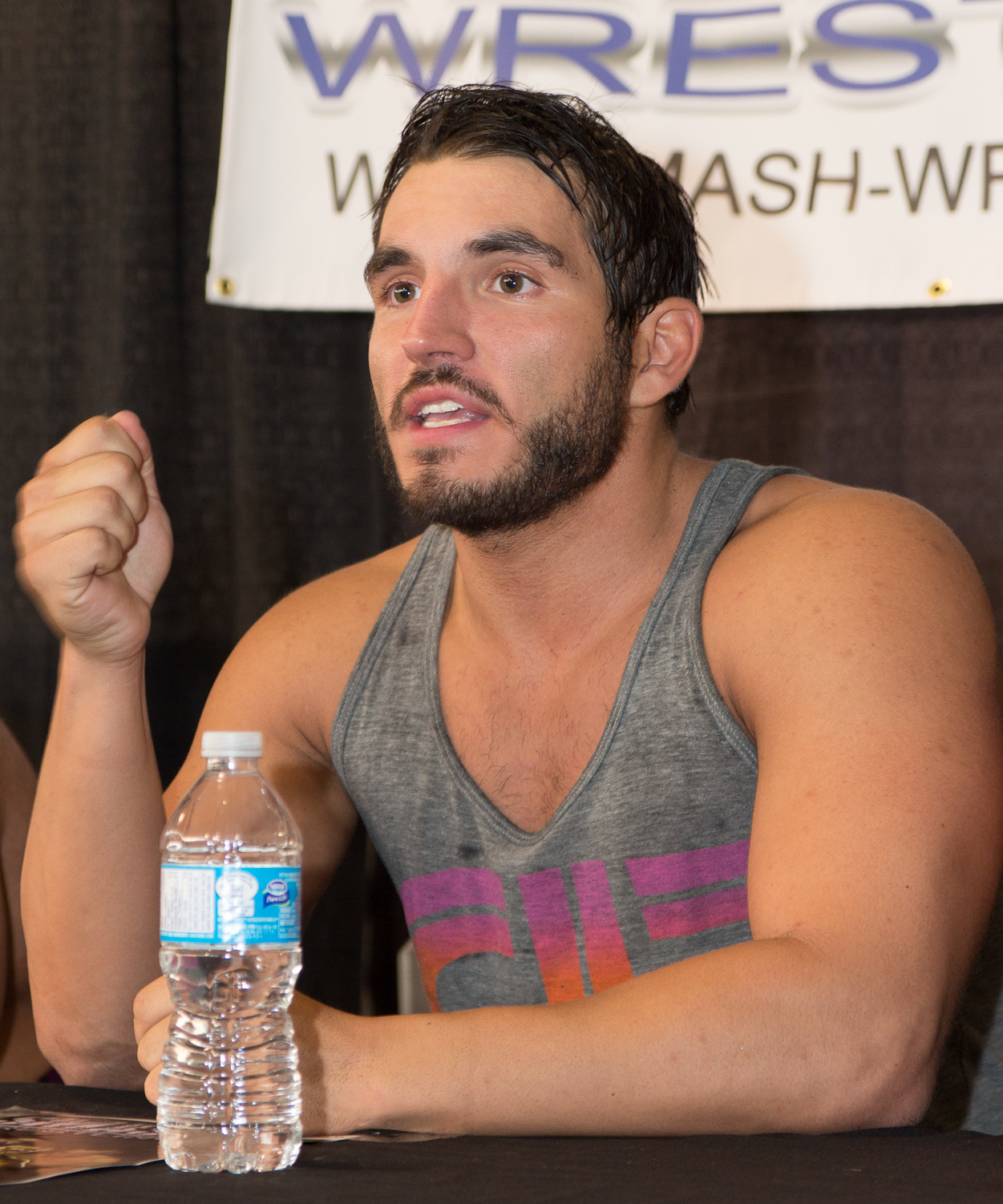
Inaugural champions Drew Galloway (left) and Johnny Gargano (right).

Evolve was founded in 2009 by Dragon Gate USA (DGUSA) booker Gabe Sapolsky, Full Impact Pro (FIP) owner Sal Hamaoui and independent wrestler Davey Richards and held its first event on January 16, 2010. On November 25, 2011, Evolve and DGUSA announced the unification of the two promotions, which would result in Evolve recognizing the Open the Freedom Gate and Open the United Gate Championships as its top two titles. On December 22, 2014, WWNLive, the parent company of both Evolve and DGUSA, announced it was putting DGUSA on hiatus until it could secure more Japanese wrestlers for the promotion's shows. The Open the United Gate Championship continued being defended at Evolve shows until May 30, 2015, when reigning champions Johnny Gargano and Rich Swann retired the title and asked for a new Evolve tag team title to be created in its place. On September 22, Evolve announced that it would start putting more emphasis on the promotion's tag team division and would create the new title, if the experiment turned out successful. On November 10, 2015, Evolve sent out a press release, officially announcing the creation of the Evolve Tag Team Championship.

=== Championship tournament ===
Evolve announced that the inaugural champions would be determined in a tournament taking place over Evolve 53, Evolve 54 and Evolve 55 from January 22 to 24, 2016, in Orlando, Florida. The first three teams participating in the tournament were revealed in the press release announcing the creation of the title. The rest of the teams were announced throughout the rest of November 2015 along with the clarification that the tournament would be contested in a single-elimination format with eight participating teams. The first round matches were announced on January 19, 2016. Timothy Thatcher was originally announced for the tournament, but he was forced to pull out due to a staph infection and was replaced by Sami Callihan.

Participating teams

- The Bravado Brothers (Harlem Bravado and Lancelot Bravado)
- Catch Point (Drew Gulak and T. J. Perkins)
- Heroes. Eventually. Die. (Chris Hero and Tommy End)
- Drew Galloway and Johnny Gargano
- The Premier Athlete Brand (Anthony Nese and Caleb Konley)
- Roppongi Vice (Rocky Romero and Trent Baretta)
- Sami Callihan and Zack Sabre Jr.
- Team Tremendous (Bill Carr and Dan Barry)

First round (January 22)
Callihan and Sabre	Pin
Hero and End
Roppongi Vice	Pin
Carr and Barry
Nese and Konley	Pin
The Bravado Brothers
Galloway and Gargano	Pin
Gulak and Perkins

Semifinals (January 23)
Hero and End	Pin
Roppongi Vice
The Bravado Brothers	Sub
Galloway and Gargano

Finals (January 24)
Hero and End	Sub
Galloway and Gargano

== Title history ==
Key
No.	Overall reign number
Reign	Reign number for the specific team—reign numbers for the individuals are in parentheses, if different
Days	Number of days held
Defenses	Number of successful defenses

No.	Champion	Championship change			Reign statistics			Notes	Ref.
No.	Champion	Date	Event	Location	Reign	Days	Defenses	Notes	Ref.
Evolve
1	Drew Galloway and Johnny Gargano	January 24, 2016	Evolve 55	Orlando, FL	1	69	2	Galloway and Gargano defeated Chris Hero and Tommy End in the finals of an eight-team tournament to become the inaugural champions.	
2	Catch Point (Drew Gulak and Tracy Williams)	April 2, 2016	Evolve 59	Dallas, TX	1	105	2		
3	Drew Galloway (2) and Dustin	July 16, 2016	Evolve 64	New York City, NY	1	120	1		
4	Catch Point (Fred Yehi and Tracy Williams (2))	November 13, 2016	Evolve 73	Joppa, MD	1	160	3	This was a four-way tag team elimination match, also involving Drew Gulak and Tony Nese, and The Gatekeepers (Blaster McMassive and Flex Rumblecrunch). Chris Hero replaced an injured Drew Galloway.	
5	Catch Point (Chris Dickinson and Jaka)	April 22, 2017	Evolve 82	New York City, NY	1	77	2		
6	The Lethal Enforcers (Anthony Henry and JD Drake)	July 8, 2017	Evolve 88	Charlotte, NC	1	76	3		
7	The Troll Boyz (A. C. H. and Ethan Page)	September 22, 2017	Evolve 92	Livonia, MI	1	1	0		
8	Doom Patrol (Chris Dickinson and Jaka)	September 23, 2017	Evolve 93	Summit, IL	2	400	9	Formerly known as Catch Point.	
9	The Street Profits (Angelo Dawkins and Montez Ford)	October 28, 2018	Evolve 114	Ybor City, FL	1	138	6		
10	The Unwanted (Eddie Kingston and Joe Gacy)	March 15, 2019	Evolve 123	Melrose, MA	1	120	2		
11	A. R. Fox and Leon Ruff	July 13, 2019	Evolve 131	Philadelphia, PA	1	147	4		
12	Besties in the World (Davey Vega and Mat Fitchett)	December 7, 2019	Evolve 142	Chicago, IL	1	208	1		
—	Deactivated	July 2, 2020	—	—	—	—	—	Deactivated when Evolve ceased operations.	

== Combined reigns ==
Rank	Team	No. of reigns	Combined defenses	Combined days
1	Catch Point/Doom Patrol (Jaka and Chris Dickinson)	2	11	477
2	Catch Point (Fred Yehi and Tracy Williams)	1	3	160
3	A. R. Fox and Leon Ruff	1	4	147
4	The Street Profits (Angelo Dawkins and Montez Ford)	1	6	138
5	The Unwanted (Eddie Kingston and Joe Gacy)	1	2	120
5	Drew Galloway and Dustin	1	1	120
7	Catch Point (Drew Gulak and Tracy Williams)	1	2	105
8	The Lethal Enforcers (Anthony Henry and JD Drake)	1	3	76
9	Drew Galloway and Johnny Gargano	1	2	69
10	Besties in the World (Davey Vega and Mat Fitchett)	1	1	62
11	The Troll Boyz (A. C. H. and Ethan Page)	1	0	1

=== By wrestler ===
Rank	Wrestler	No. of reigns	Combined defenses	Combined days
1	Chris Dickinson	2	11	477
1	Jaka	2	11	477
3	Tracy Williams	2	5	265
4	Drew Galloway	2	3	189
5	Fred Yehi	1	3	160
6	A. R. Fox	1	4	147
6	Leon Ruff	1	4	147
8	Angelo Dawkins	1	6	138
8	Montez Ford	1	6	138
10	Eddie Kingston	1	2	120
10	Joe Gacy	1	2	120
10	Dustin	1	1	120
13	Drew Gulak	1	2	105
14	Anthony Henry	1	3	76
14	JD Drake	1	3	76
16	Johnny Gargano	1	2	69
17	Davey Vega	1	1	62
17	Mat Fitchett	1	1	62
19	A. C. H.	1	0	1
19	Ethan Page	1	0	1

== See also ==
- Evolve Championship
- Open the United Gate Championship
