= Besties in the World =

Professional wrestling tag team

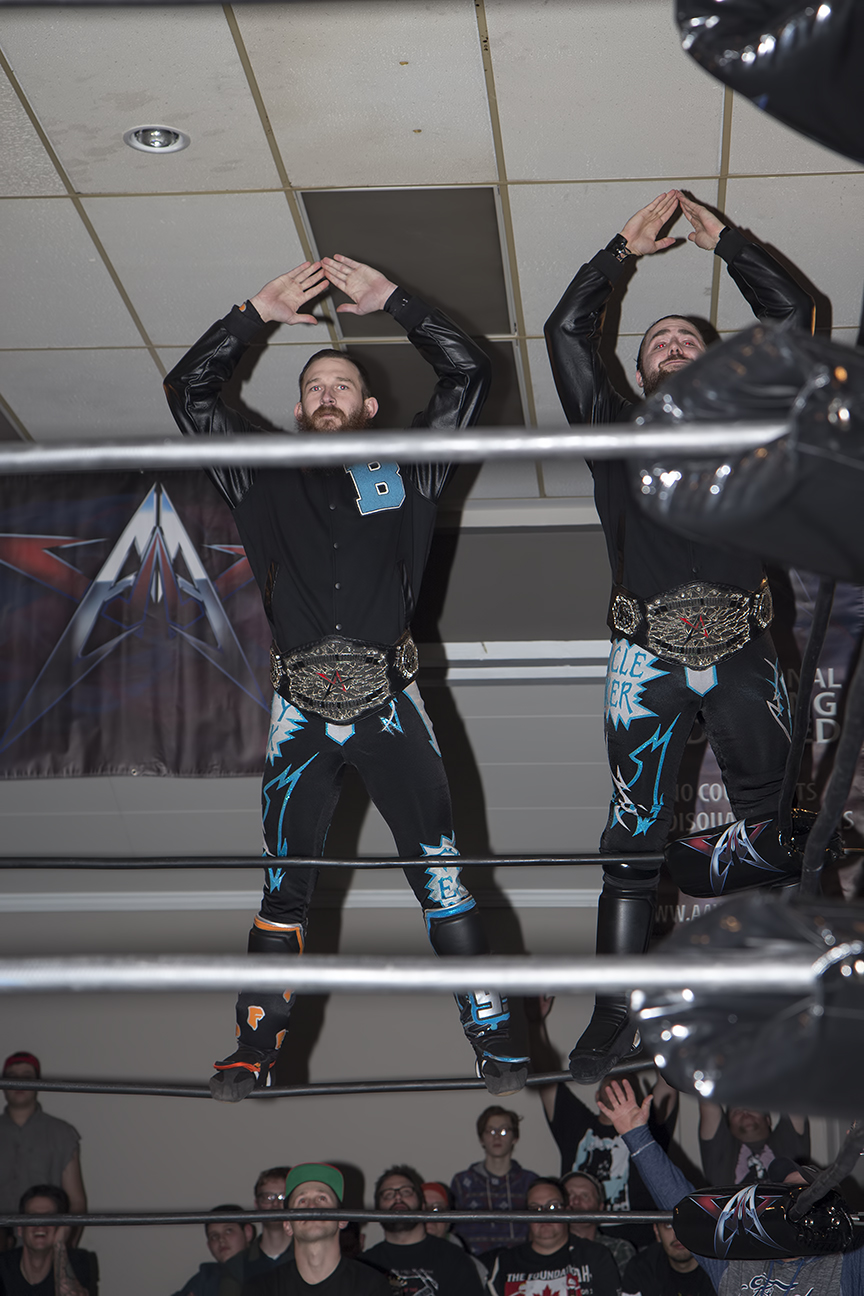
- Fitchett (left) and Vega (right) in December 2016

Tag team
- Members: Mat Fitchett; Davey Vega
- Name(s): Sex Bob-ombs; Kobra Kai Dojo (The) Besties In The World; Grindhouse
- Billed heights: Fitchett: 6 ft 0 in (1.83 m); Vega: 5 ft 11 in (1.80 m)
- Combined billed weight: Fitchett: 172 lbs Vega: 180 lbs
- Debut: 2010
- Years active: 2010–2013; 2015–2022; 2024–present

(The) Besties in the World, currently activating under the ring name of Grindhouse is an American professional wrestling tag team composed of Mat Fitchett and Davey Vega. They are best known for their work in various promotion of the American independent scene such as AAW Wrestling and Pro Wrestling Zero1 USA.

== Professional wrestling career ==
=== American independent circuit (2010–present) ===
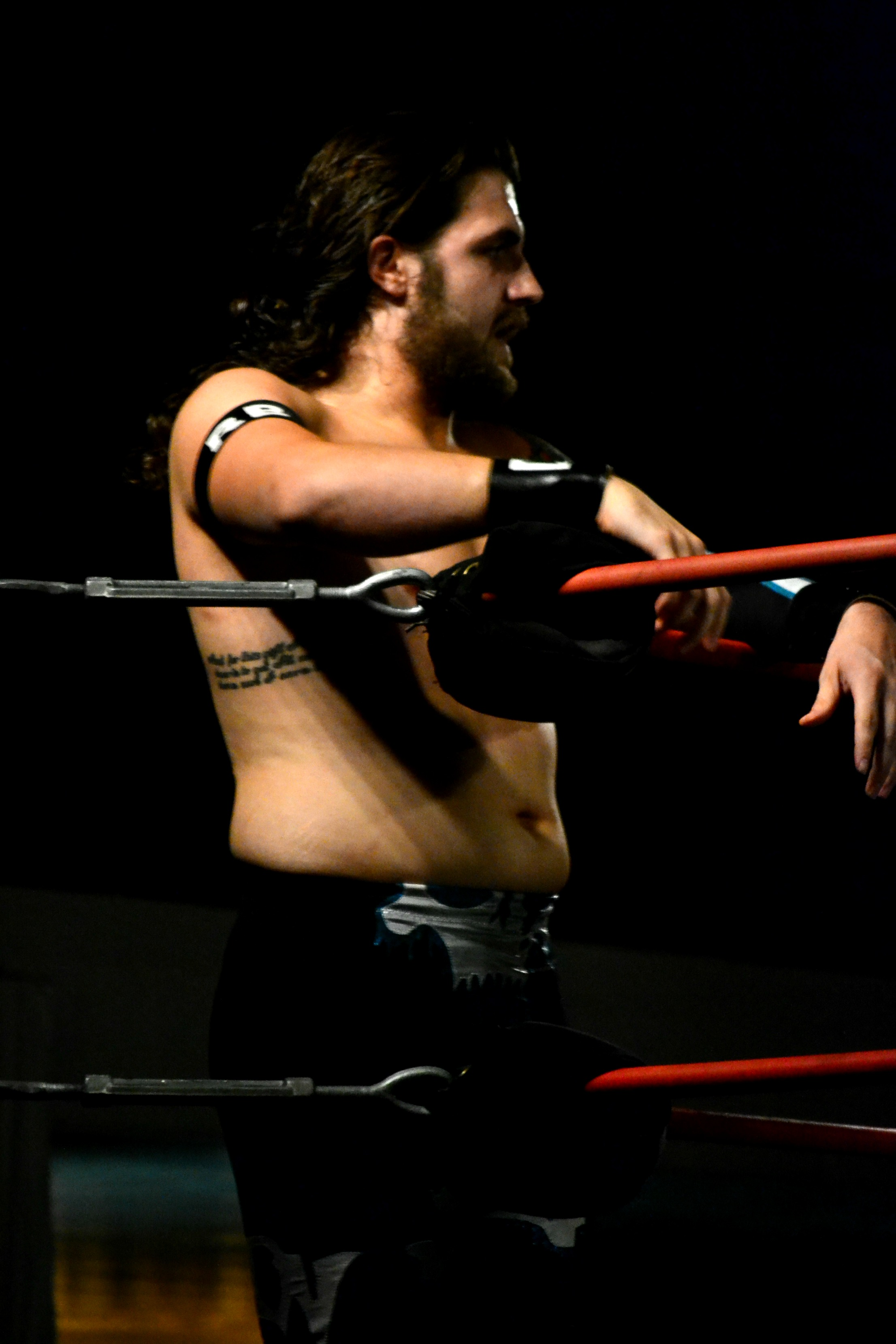
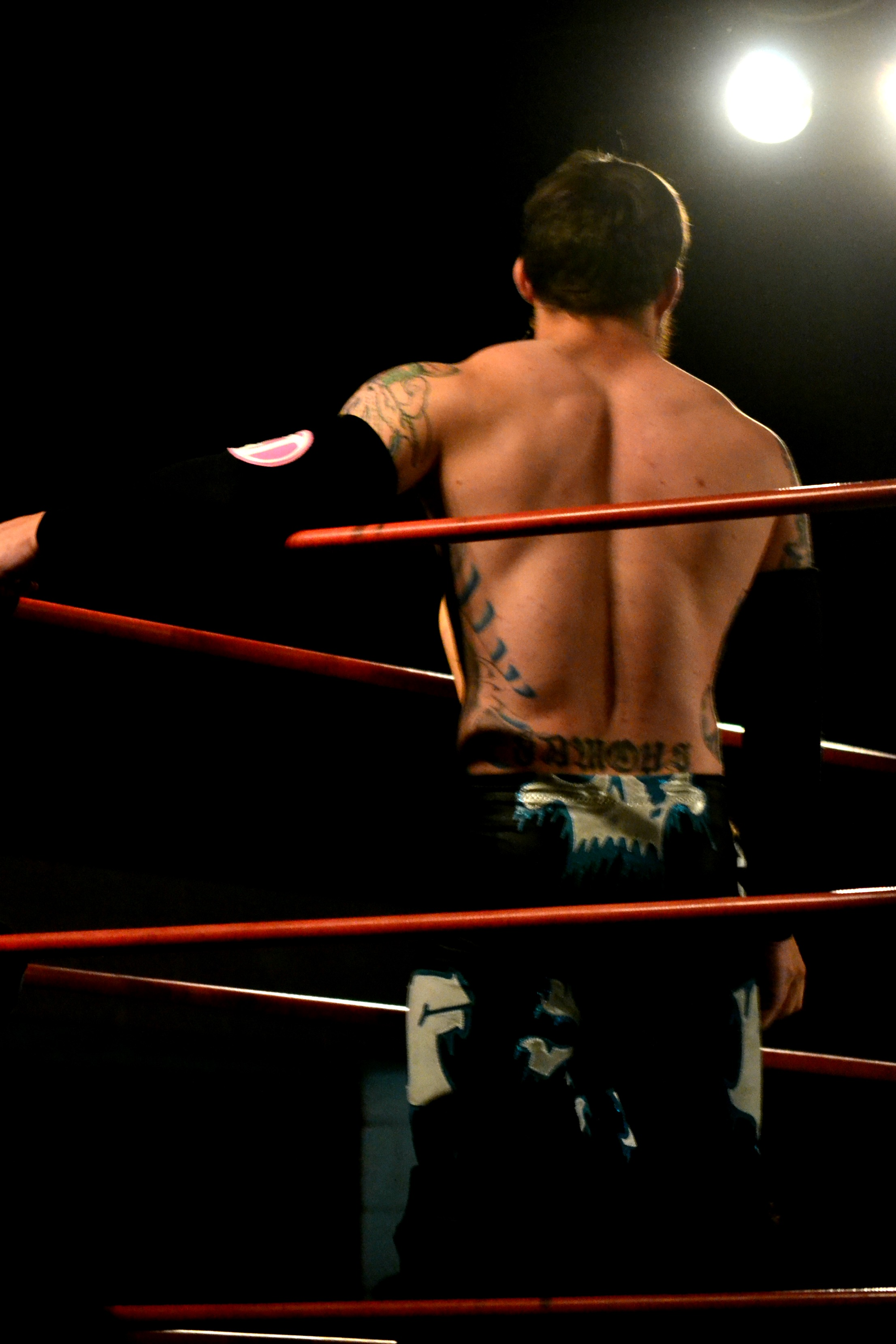
Vega (left) and Fitchett (right) in October 2015

Fitchett and Vega made their debut as a tag team at a house show promoted by High Voltage Wrestling on August 7, 2010, where they teamed up with Billy McNeil to defeat Evan Gelistico, Gary Jay and Pierre Abernathy as a result of a six-man tag team match. Due to their main freelance work, Fitchett and Vega worked for various promotions from the American circuit with which they shared brief or longer tenures such as AAW Wrestling, Alpha-1 Wrestling, Evolve, Metro Pro Wrestling, Premiere Wrestling Xperience, Full Impact Pro and many others.

At ROH Masters Of The Craft 2018 on April 15, Fitchett and Vega unsuccessfully challenged The Briscoes (Jay Briscoe and Mark Briscoe) for the ROH World Tag Team Championship. At Impact Wrestling/Rockstar Pro Ohio Versus Everything, a cross-over event promoted on December 14, 2018, Fitchett and Vega unsuccessfully challenged reigning champions Latin American Exchange (Ortiz & Santana) and The Dirty (Austin Manix & Brandon Edwards) for the TNA World Tag Team Championship.

==== AAW Wrestling (2012–present) ====
Fitchett and Vega are best known for their tenure with AAW Wrestling. They made their debut in the promotion at AAW Point Of No Return 2012 on April 21, where they defeated The Awesome Threesome (Jordan McEntyre and Knight Wagner). During their time in the promotion, they won the AAW Tag Team Championship on three separate occasions, first at AAW Epic 2016: The 12 Year Anniversary Event on April 9, by defeating The Hooligans (Devin Cutter and Mason Cutter). They won the titles on the second occasion at Hell Hath No Fury on November 3, 2017, where they defeated Scarlet and Graves (Dezmond Xavier and Zachary Wentz). On the third occasion, Fitchett and Vega won the titles at Jim Lynam Memorial Tournament on August 29, 2019, by defeating Latin American Xchange (Ortiz and Santana).

Fitchett and Vega also worked as singles competitors after 2022 when they briefly dissolved their tag team. Fitchett won the 2021 edition of the Jim Lynam Memorial Tournament by defeating Jake Something in the first rounds, ACH in the quarterfinals, Schaff in the semifinals and Josh Alexander in the finals. Fitchett also won the AAW Heavyweight Championship for the first time at Windy City Classic XVI on November 26, 2021, by defeating Fred Yehi. Vega succeeded in winning the Heavyweight title as well by defeating Jake Something at The Art of War 2023 on August 21.

==== Various promotions (2010–present) ====
In Evolve, Fitchett and Vega made their debut at Evolve 134 on August 25, 2019, where they fell short to The Skulk (Adrian Alanis and Liam Gray) and The Unwanted (Joe Gacy and Sean Maluta). At Evolve 142 on December 7, 2019, they defeated A. R. Fox and Leon Ruff to win the Evolve Tag Team Championship. They kept the titles until the promotion ceased operations in June 2020.

Fitchett and Vega made their debut for the United States branch of Pro Wrestling Zero1 on a house show from February 27, 2021, where they defeated The Premier (Campbell Myers and SK Bishop) to win the Zero1 USA World Tag Team Championship. They dropped the titles two months later back to Myers and Bishop.

Fitchett and Vega made their AEW debut at AEW Rampage #44 on June 8, 2022, where they fell short to Jay Lethal and Satnam Singh. One week later at AEW Dark: Elevation #68, Fitchett and Vega fell short to Swerve in Our Glory (Keith Lee and Swerve Strickland).

=== European independent circuit (2018–2019) ===
Fitchett and Vega made their debut in the European independent scene at RevPro Live In Southampton 3, an event promoted by Revolution Pro Wrestling on June 3, 2018, they teamed up with Kurtis Chapman and Psycho Phillips in a losing effort against Legion Of Lords (Gideon Grey, Los Federales Santos Jr., No Fun Dunne and Rishi Ghosh). During Progress Wrestling's 2018 World Cup, they fell short to M&M (Connor Mills and Maverick Mayhew) in tag team competition. At PROGRESS Chapter 72: Got Got Need on June 24, 2018, they teamed up with Josh Alexander in a losing effort against British Strong Style (Pete Dunne, Trent Seven and Tyler Bate).

== Championships and accomplishments ==
- AAW Wrestling
  - AAW Heavyweight Championship (2 times) – Fitchett (1) and Vega (1)
  - AAW Heritage Championship (2 times) – Vega
  - AAW Tag Team Championship (3 times)
  - Jim Lynam Memorial Tournament (2021) – Fitchett
  - Chi-Town Rumble (2025) – Vega
- Alpha-1 Wrestling
  - A1 Tag Team Championship (1 time)
- Black Label Pro
  - BLP Tag Team Championship (1 time)
- Evolve
  - Evolve Tag Team Championship (1 time, final)
- Fight Club: PRO
  - FCP Tag Team Championship (1 time)
- Glory Pro Wrestling
  - United Glory Tag Team Championship (2 times)
  - United Glory Title Tournament (2017)
- Metro Pro Wrestling
  - MPW Tag Team Championship (3 times)
- Premiere Wrestling Xperience
  - PWX Tag Team Championship (1 time, current)
- Pro Wrestling Illustrated
  - Ranked Vega No. 296 of the top 500 singles wrestlers in the PWI 500 of 2020
  - Ranked Fitchett No. 297 of the top 500 singles wrestlers in the PWI 500 of 2020
- Pro Wrestling Zero1 USA
  - Zero1 USA World Tag Team Championship (1 time)
- Saint Louis Anarchy
  - SLA Heavyweight Championship (2 time, current) – Fitchett
- The Wrestling Revolver
  - PWR Tag Team Championship (3 times)
