= Revolver World Tag Team Championship =

Professional wrestling championship

- The current Revolver World Tag Team Championship belt design

Details
- Promotion: The Wrestling Revolver
- Date established: August 1, 2017
- Current champions: Oi4k (Jake Crist, Rich Swann, and Trey Miguel)
- Date won: August 15, 2026

Other names
- Revolver Tag Team Championship (2017–2021); Revolver World Tag Team Championship (2021–present); Revolver World Trios Tag Team Championship (2026–present)
Statistics
- First champions: The Besties in the World (Davey Vega and Matt Fitchett)
- Most reigns: As tag team (4 reigns): The Rascalz; As individual (4 reigns): Zachary Wentz; Trey Miguel
- Longest reign: The Crew (Rich Swann and Jason Cade) (621 days)
- Shortest reign: Alpha Sig (Brent Oakley, KC Jacobs, and Dick Meyers) (2nd reign, 27 days)
- Oldest champion: Jake Crist (42 years, 33 days)
- Youngest champion: Millie McKenzie (17 years, 349 days)
- Heaviest champion: R.E.D (Steve Maclin, Alex Colon, Dark Pledge, and RSP) (>695 lb (315 kg))
- Lightest champion: Pete Dunne and Millie McKenzie (333 lb (151 kg))

The Revolver World Tag Team Championship is a professional wrestling tag team championship created and promoted by The Wrestling Revolver. Established on August 1, 2017, the title was originally called the Revolver Tag Team Championship before it was later renamed to the Revolver World Tag Team Championship. Since 2026, the title has been defended in six-man tag team matches. The current champions are Oi4k (Jake Crist, Rich Swann, and Trey Miguel), who are in the first reign as a team. Individually, it is Crist's first reign, Swann's second, and Miguel's fourth. They won the title by defeating Tye or Die (Ryan Matthias, KJ Reynolds, and Amazanga) at Cage of Horrors on August 15, 2026.

== History ==
On August 1, 2017, The Wrestling Revolver announced the Revolver Tag Team Championship, a professional wrestling tag team championship. The inaugural champions were the Besties in the World (Davey Vega and Matt Fitchett), who won the title by defeating Alienated Youth (Trey Miguel and Zachary Wentz), Chimera (Luchasaurus and Serpentico), The World's Cutest Tag Team (Candice LeRae and Joey Ryan) and Zero Gravity (Brett Gakiya and CJ Esparza) in a five-way tag team ladder match at Tales from the Ring on October 28, 2017. On October 20, 2021, the title was renamed the Revolver World Tag Team Championship.

== Reigns ==
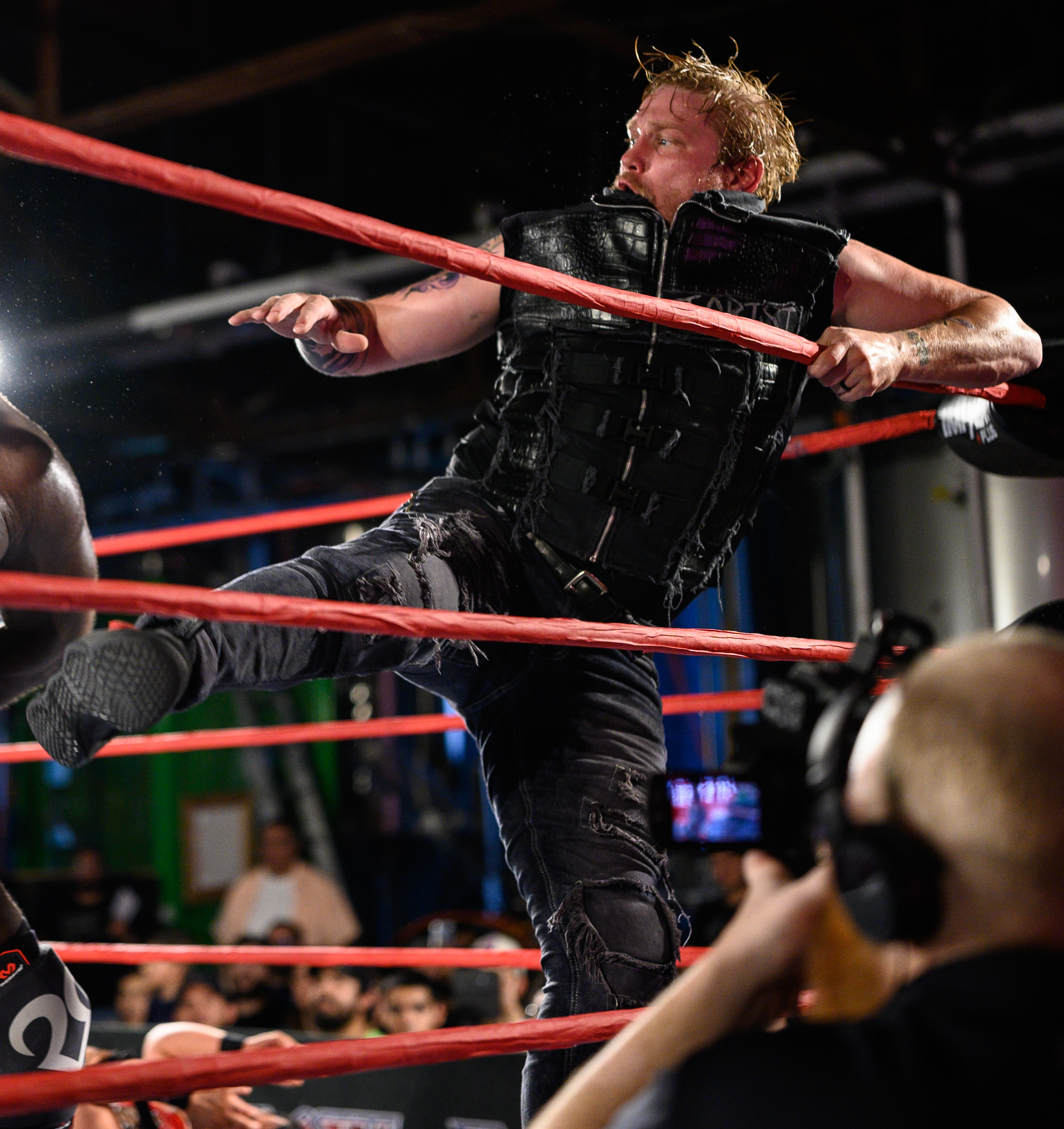
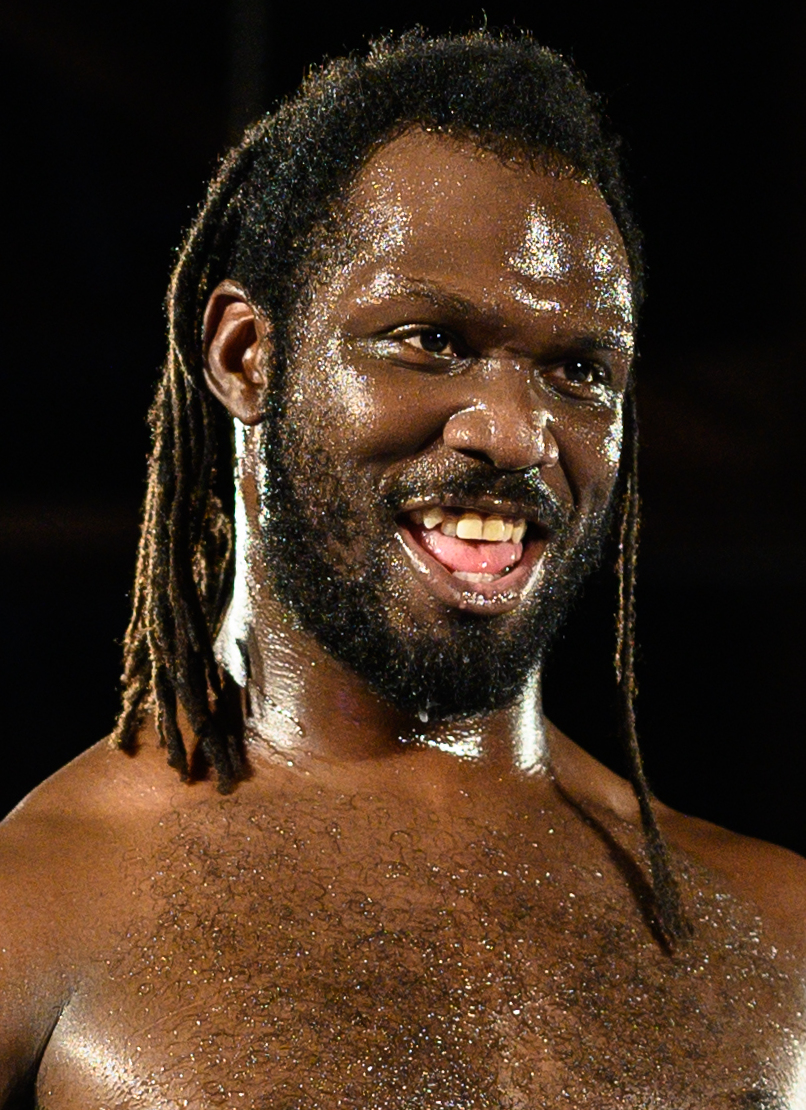
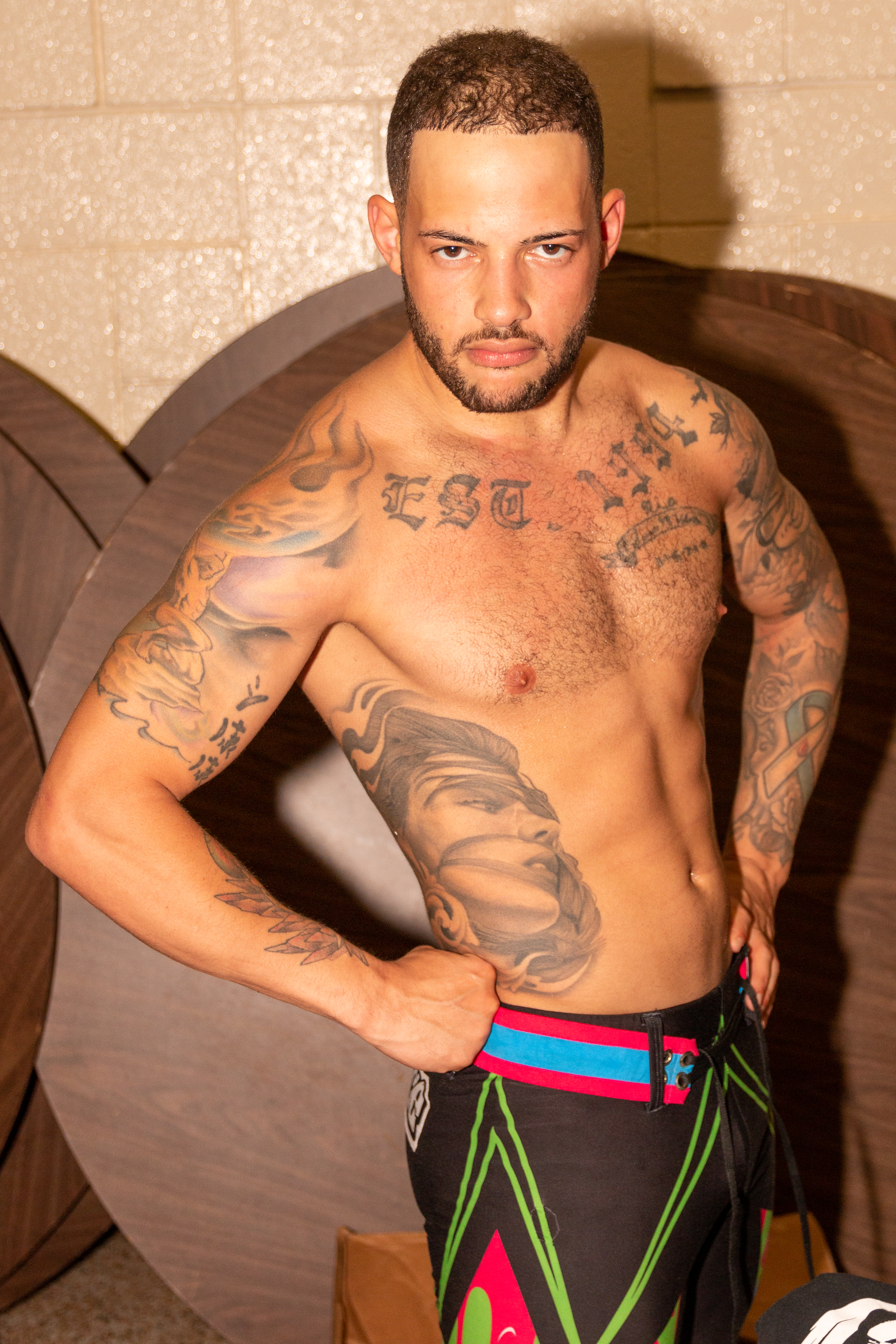
Current champions Oi4k (Jake Crist, Rich Swann, and Trey Miguel)

As of November 19, 2026, there have been 31 reigns among 22 teams and 50 individual champions with three vacancies. The Besties in the World (Davey Vega and Matt Fitchett) were the inaugural champions. As a team, The Rascalz (Dezmond Xavier, Myron Reed, Trey Miguel, and Zachary Wentz) have the most reigns at four, while Miguel and Wentz are tied for the most individual reigns at four. The Crew (Rich Swann and Jason Cade) have the longest reign at 621 days, while Alpha Sig's (Brent Oakley, KC Jacobs, and Dick Meyers) second reign is the shortest in the title's history at 27 days. Jake Crist is the oldest champion at 42 years old, while Millie McKenzie is the youngest champion at 17 years old. McKenzie is also the only female champion.

Oi4k (Jake Crist, Rich Swann, and Trey Miguel) are the current champions in the first reign as a team. Individually, it Crist's first reign, Swann's second, and Miguel's fourth. They won the title by defeating Tye or Die (Ryan Matthias, KJ Reynolds, and Amazanga) at Cage of Horrors on August 15, 2026, in Dayton, Ohio.

Key
No.	Overall reign number
Reign	Reign number for the specific team—reign numbers for the individuals are in parentheses, if different
Days	Number of days held

No.	Champion	Championship change			Reign statistics		Notes	Ref.
No.	Champion	Date	Event	Location	Reign	Days	Notes	Ref.
1	Besties in the World (Davey Vega and Matt Fitchett)	October 28, 2017	Tales from the Ring	Clive, IA	1	40	Defeated Alienated Youth (Trey Miguel and Zachary Wentz), Chimera (Luchasaurus and Serpentico), The World's Cutest Tag Team (Candice LeRae and Joey Ryan) and Zero Gravity (Brett Gakiya and CJ Esparza) in a five-way tag team ladder match to become the inaugural champions.	
2	Zero Gravity (CJ Esparza and Brett Gakiya)	December 7, 2017	Uptown VFW	Minneapolis, MN	1	71	This was a F1rst Wrestling event.	
3	Besties in the World (Davey Vega and Matt Fitchett)	February 16, 2018	Friday the 16th Naito Takes Dayton	Dayton, OH	2	105	This four-way tag team match also featured The Dirty (Austin Manix and Brandon Edwards) and The Night Ryderz (Aaron Williams and Dustin Rayz).	
4	Pete Dunne and Millie McKenzie	June 1, 2018	FCP World Warriors	Wolverhampton, West Midlands, England	1	28	This was a Fight Club: Pro event.	
5	The Rascalz (Dezmond Xavier and Zachary Wentz)	June 29, 2018	FCP International Tekkers: Nothing Is True, Everything Is Permitted	Wolverhampton, West Midlands, England	1	253	This was a Fight Club: Pro event. This three-way tag team match also featured The Besties in the World (Davey Vega and Matt Fitchett).	
6	LAX (Mike Santana and Ortiz)	March 9, 2019	It's Always Sunny in Iowa	Des Moines, IA	1	28	This three-way tag team match also featured The Besties in the World (Davey Vega and Matt Fitchett).	
7	Team Tremendous (Dan Barry and Big Bill Carr)	April 6, 2019	Pancakes & Piledrivers 3	New York City, NY	1	34	This six-way tag team gauntlet match also featured The Rascalz (Dezmond Xavier and Zachary Wentz), Lucha Brothers (Rey Fénix and Penta El 0M), Aussie Open (Kyle Fletcher and Mark Davis), and Besties in the World (Davey Vega and Mat Fitchett), where Team Tremendous last eliminated previous champions LAX (Ortiz and Mike Santana).	
8	Besties in the World (Davey Vega and Matt Fitchett)	May 10, 2019	3 Year Anniversary	Des Moines, IA	3	77	This four-way tag team match also featured Arik Cannon and Jimmy Jacobs and oVe (Jake Crist and Madman Fulton).	
9	The North (Josh Alexander and Ethan Page)	July 26, 2019	Afraid of the Dark	Des Moines, IA	1	154	This three-way tag team match also featured The Crew (Jason Cade and Rich Swann).	
10	The Crew (Rich Swann and Jason Cade)	December 27, 2019	The Night After X-Mas	Des Moines, IA	1	621	This five-way tag team gauntlet match also featured Dezmond Xavier and Kimber Lee and Logan James & Tyler Matrix and The Besties in the World (Davey Vega and Mat Fitchett), where The Crew last eliminated previous champions The North (Ethan Page and Josh Alexander).	
—	Vacated	September 8, 2021	—	—	—	—	After Wrestling Revolver did not hold an event for over a year due to the COVID-19 lockdowns, the promotion decided to vacate the Revolver Championship and the Revolver Tag Team Championship.	
11	American Wolves (Davey Richards and Eddie Edwards)	October 30, 2021	Tales from the Ring	Clive, IA	1	168	Defeated Infrared (Logan James and Tyler Matrix) to win the vacant title.	
12	P.O.S (Steve Maclin and Westin Blake)	April 16, 2022	Swerve's House	Clive, IA	1	84		
13	The OGK (Matt Taven and Mike Bennett)	July 9, 2022	Cage of Horrors	Clive, IA	1	147		
14	DadScout (Dan the Dad and Manscout Manning)	December 3, 2022	Season Finale	Clive, IA	1	61	This three-way tag team match also featured Infrared (Logan James and Tyler Matrix).	
15	The ABC (Ace Austin and Chris Bey)	February 2, 2023	A Night at the Moxbury	Dayton, OH	1	30		
16	The Rascalz (Trey Miguel and Zachary Wentz)	March 4, 2023	Drip	Clive, IA	2 (1, 2)	33	This three-way tag team match also featured The Second Gear Crew (Mance Warner and Matthew Justice).	
17	The ABC (Ace Austin and Chris Bey)	April 6, 2023	Thursday	Dayton, OH	2	30		
18	The Rascalz (Trey Miguel, Zachary Wentz, and Myron Reed)	May 6, 2023	Mayhem for All	Clive, IA	3 (2, 3, 1)	56	Defeated David Finlay and previous champions The ABC (Ace Austin and Chris Bey) in a six-man tag team match.	
19	SGC (Mance Warner, Matthew Justice, and 1 Called Manders)	July 1, 2023	Cage of Horrors	Clive, IA	1	99		
20	R.E.D (Steve Maclin, Alex Colon, and RSP)	October 8, 2023	Redemption	Dayton, OH	1 (2, 1, 1)	109	Colon and RSP won the titles, while Maclin was later recognized as champion. Matthew Justice and 1 Called Manders defended the title.	
21	GYV (James Drake and Zack Gibson)	January 25, 2024	Mox vs. Gringo	Dayton, OH	1	51	This four-way tag team match also featured The Rascalz (Trey Miguel and Zachary Wentz) and The Second Gear Crew (1 Called Manders and Matthew Justice). Colon and RSP defended the title.	
22	Lucha Things (Lince Dorado and Samuray del Sol)	March 16, 2024	Ready or Not!	Clive, IA	1	165		
—	Vacated	August 28, 2024	—	—	—	—	Lince Dorado, one-half of the previous champions Lucha Things, relinquished the title. He stated that he longer needed Samuray del Sol, his Lucha Things partner, and retired from tag team wrestling.	
23	R.E.D (Steve Maclin, Alex Colon, Dark Pledge, and RSP)	September 21, 2024	Tales from the Ring	Clive, IA	2 (3, 2, 1, 2)	77	Colon and Pledge won the title, while Maclin and RSP were also recognized as champions.	
24	Alpha Sigma Sigma (Brent Oakley and KC Jacobs)	December 7, 2024	Season Finale	Clive, IA	1	105	This was a No Rope Barbed Wire match, where Alex Colon and Dark Pledge defended the title.	
25	The Macabre (Krule and DreadKnot)	March 22, 2025	Goated	Clive, IA	1	57		
26	Alpha Sig (Brent Oakley, KC Jacobs, and Dick Meyers)	May 18, 2025	Let Us Cook	Dayton, OH	2 (2, 2, 1)	27	Oakley and Jacobs won the title, while Meyers was also recognized as champion.	
27	The Macabre (Krule, DreadKnot, and Alan Angels)	June 14, 2025	Cage of Horrors	Des Moines, IA	2 (2, 2, 1)	84	This was a Frat House Rules match.	
28	Latinos Most Wanted (Sabin Gauge and Koda Hernandez)	September 6, 2025	Clean Slate	Clive, IA	1	98		
29	The Rascalz (Dezmond Xavier, Zachary Wentz, and Trey Miguel)	December 13, 2025	Season Finale	Des Moines, IA	4 (2, 4, 3)	133	Xavier and Wentz won the title, while Miguel was also recognized as champion.	
—	Vacated	April 25, 2026	—	—	—	—	The Rascalz (Dezmond Xavier and Zachary Wentz) relinquished the title due to their inability to appear and defend the title at Revolver Strong later that day.	
30	Tye or Die (Ryan Matthias, KJ Reynolds, and Amazanga)	April 25, 2026	Revolver Strong	Dayton, OH	1	112	Matthias and Reynolds defeated Abel Booker and Jacksyn Crowley to win the vacant title. Amazanga was also recognized as champion.	
31	Oi4k (Jake Crist, Rich Swann, and Trey Miguel)	August 15, 2026	Cage of Horrors	Dayton, OH	1 (1, 2, 4)	96+		

== Combined reigns ==
As of November 19, 2026.

†	Indicates the current champion

=== By team ===
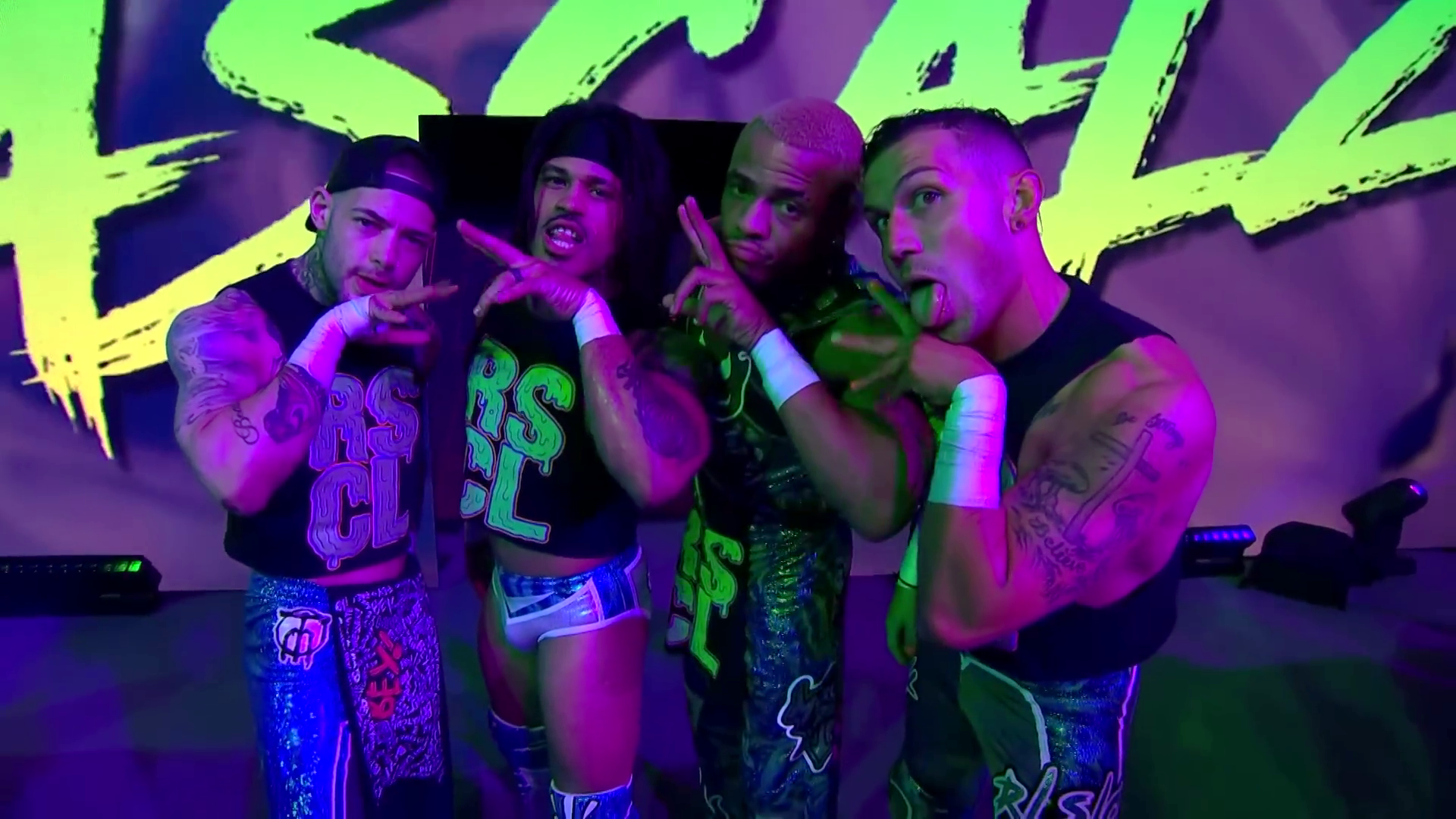
The Rascalz (Trey Miguel, Dezmond Xavier, Myron Reed, and Zachary Wentz (from left to right)) have the most combined reigns at four.

Rank	Team	No. of reigns	Combined days
1	The Crew (Rich Swann and Jason Cade)	1	621
2	The Rascalz (1st reign: Dezmond Xavier and Zachary Wentz) (2nd reign: Trey Miguel and Wentz) (3rd reign: Miguel, Wentz, and Myron Reed) (4th reign: Xavier, Wentz, and Miguel)	4	475
3	Besties in the World (Davey Vega and Matt Fitchett)	3	222
4	R.E.D (1st reign: Steve Maclin, Alex Colon, and RSP); 2nd reign: Maclin, Colon, Dark Pledge, and RSP)	2	186
5	American Wolves (Davey Richards and Eddie Edwards)	1	168
6	Lucha Things (Lince Dorado and Samuray Del Sol)	1	165
7	The North (Josh Alexander and Ethan Page)	1	154
8	The OGK (Matt Taven and Mike Bennett)	1	147
9	The Macabre (1st reign: Krule and DreadKnot) (2nd reign: Krule, DreadKnot, and Alan Angels)	2	141
10	Tye or Die (Ryan Matthias, KJ Reynolds, and Amazanga)	1	112
11	Alpha Sigma Sigma / Alpha Sig (1st reign: Brent Oakley and KC Jacobs) (2nd reign: Oakley, Jacobs, and Dick Meyers)	2	105
12	SGC (Mance Warner, Matthew Justice, and 1 Called Manders)	1	99
13	Latinos Most Wanted (Sabin Gauge and Koda Hernandez)	1	98
14	Oi4k † (Jake Crist, Rich Swann, and Trey Miguel)	1	96+
15	P.O.S (Steve Maclin and Westin Blake)	1	84
16	Zero Gravity (CJ Esparza and Brett Gakiya)	1	71
17	DadScout (Dan the Dad and Manscout Manning)	1	61
18	The ABC (Ace Austin and Chris Bey)	2	60
19	GYV (James Drake and Zack Gibson)	1	51
20	Team Tremendous (Dan Barry and Big Bill Carr)	1	34
21	Pete Dunne and Millie McKenzie	1	28
21	LAX (Mike Santana and Ortiz)	1	28

=== By wrestler ===
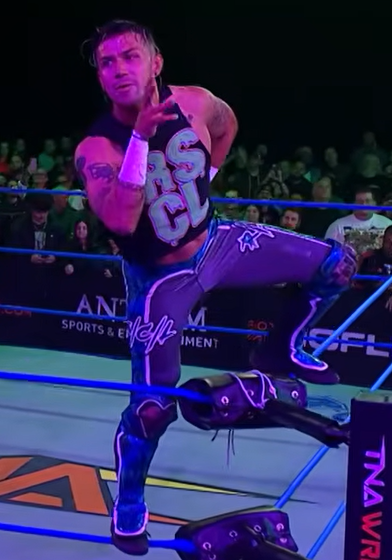
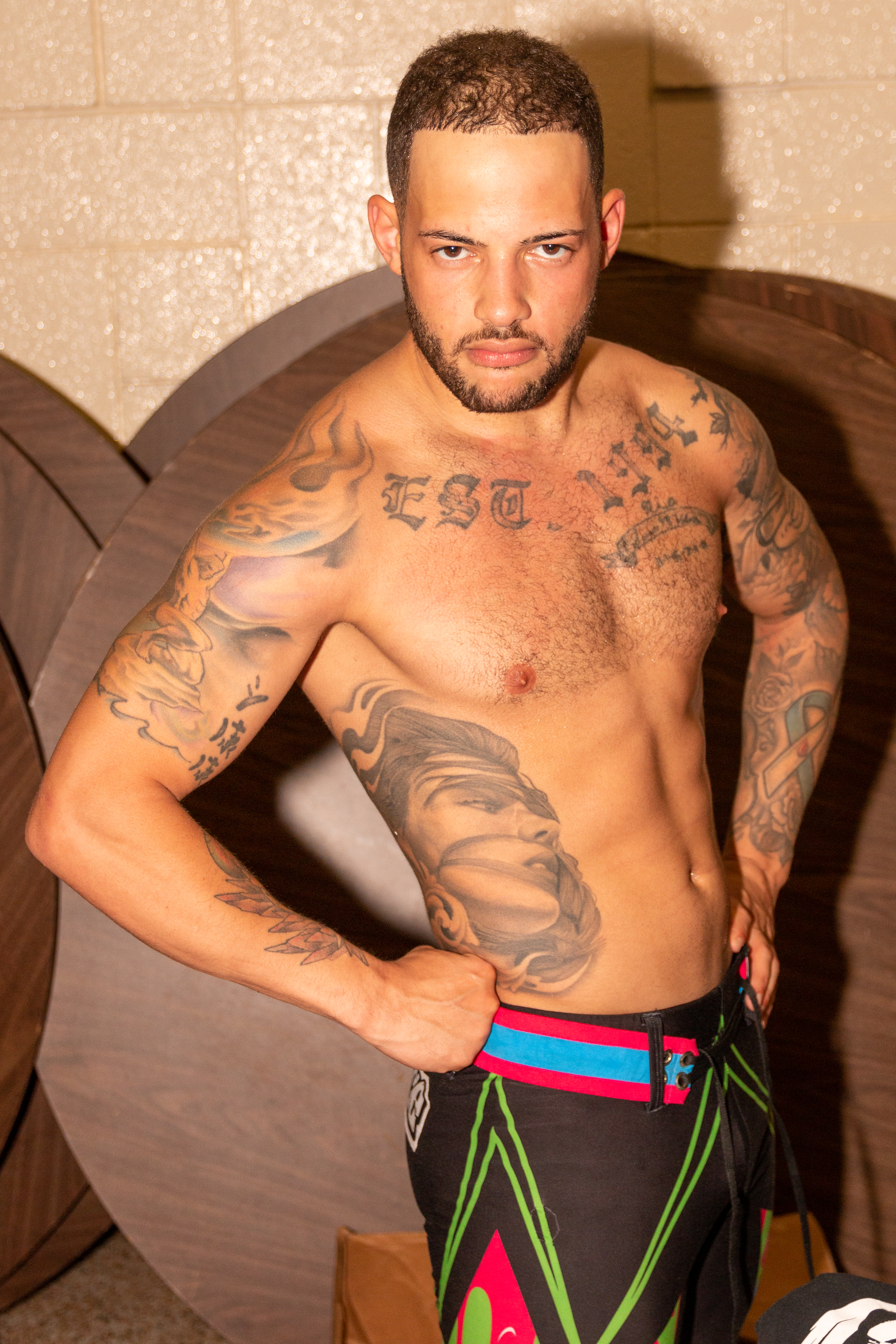
Zachary Wentz and Trey Miguel are tied for the most individual reigns at four.

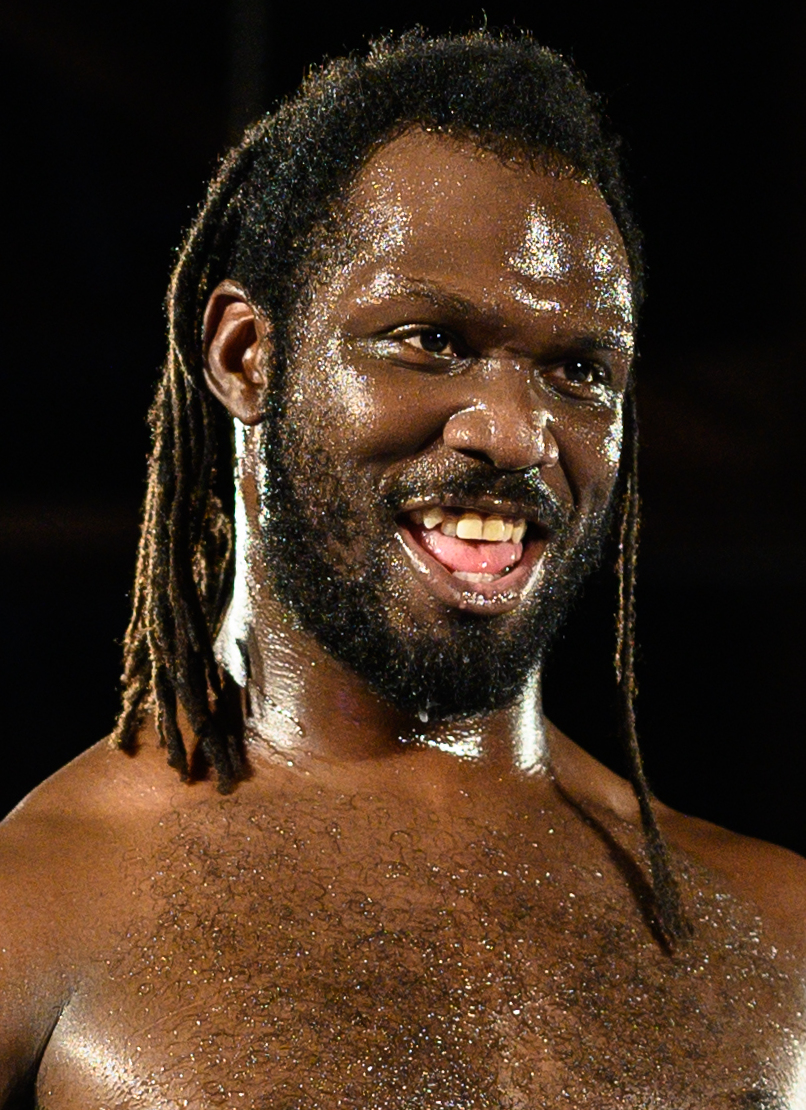
Rich Swann has the most combined days at 717+ days.

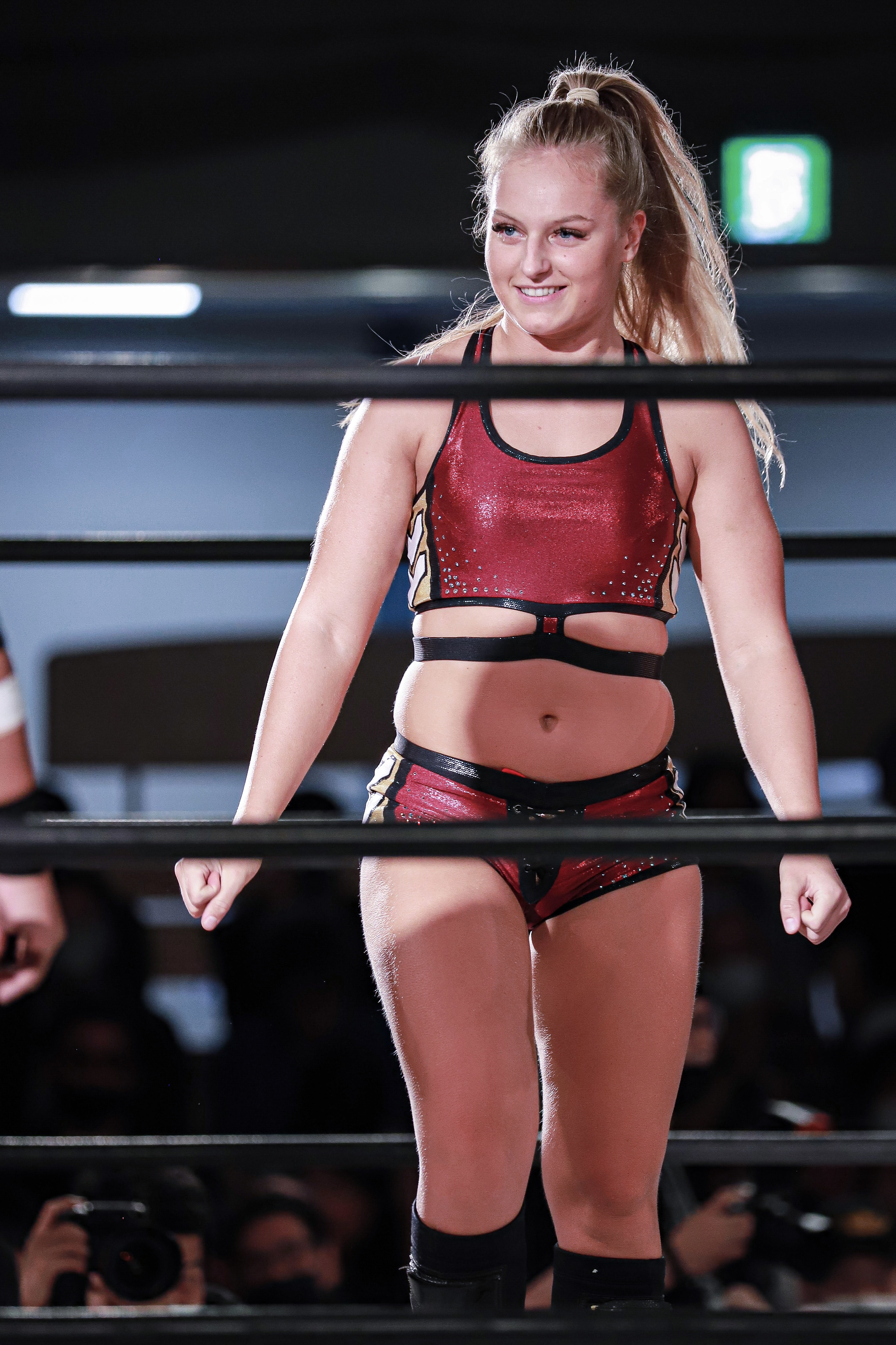
Millie McKenzie is the youngest and only female champion.

Rank	Wrestler	No. of reigns	Combined days
1	Rich Swann †	2	717+
2	Jason Cade	1	621
3	Zachary Wentz	4	475
4	Dezmond Xavier	2	386
5	Trey Miguel †	4	318+
6	Steve Maclin	3	270
7	Davey Vega	3	222
7	Matt Fitchett	3	222
9	Alex Colon	2	186
9	RSP	2	186
11	Davey Richards	1	168
11	Eddie Edwards	1	168
13	Lince Dorado	1	165
13	Samuray del Sol	1	165
15	Ethan Page	1	154
15	Josh Alexander	1	154
17	Matt Taven	1	147
17	Mike Bennett	1	147
19	DreadKnot	2	141
19	Krule	2	141
21	Brent Oakley	2	132
21	KC Jacobs	2	132
23	Amazanga	1	112
23	KJ Reynolds	1	112
23	Ryan Matthias	1	112
26	1 Called Manders	1	99
26	Mance Warner	1	99
26	Matthew Justice	1	99
29	Koda Hernandez	1	98
29	Sabin Gauge	1	98
31	Jake Crist †	1	96+
32	Alan Angels	1	84
32	Westin Blake	1	84
34	Dark Pledge	1	77
35	Brett Gakiya	1	71
35	CJ Esparza	1	71
37	Dan the Dad	1	61
37	Manscout Manning	1	61
39	Ace Austin	2	60
39	Chris Bey	2	60
41	Myron Reed	1	56
42	James Drake	1	51
42	Zack Gibson	1	51
44	Big Bill Carr	1	34
44	Dan Barry	1	34
46	Mike Santana	1	28
46	Ortiz	1	28
46	Millie McKenzie	1	28
46	Pete Dunne	1	28
50	Dick Meyers	1	27
