= Leon Ruff =

American professional wrestler

Leon Ruffin
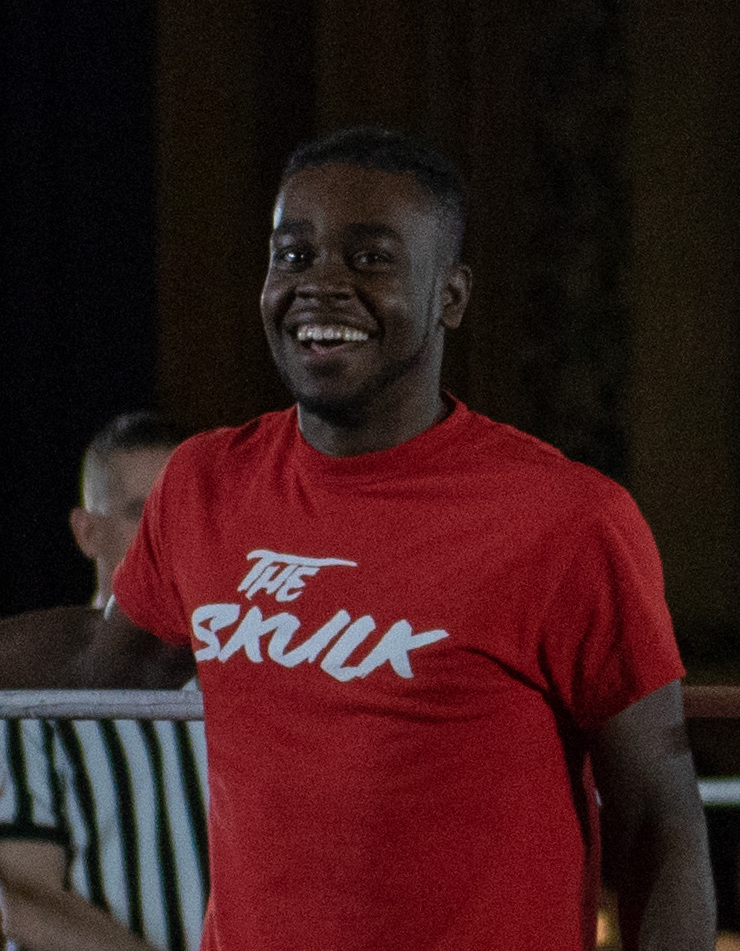
- Ruff in March 2019

Personal information
- Born: Dartanyon Ruffin; April 14, 1996 (age 30) Detroit, Michigan, U.S.
- Spouse: Aja Smith (m. 2022)

Professional wrestling career
- Ring name(s): Leon Ruff; Leon Ruffin
- Billed height: 5 ft 7 in (1.70 m)
- Billed weight: 153 lb (69 kg)
- Billed from: Pensacola, Florida
- Trained by: A. R. Fox
- Debut: January 1, 2017

Dartanyon Ruffin is an American professional wrestler. He is best known for his time in WWE where he performed under the ring name Leon Ruff, and was a one-time NXT North American Champion.

== Professional wrestling career ==
=== Evolve (2018–2020) ===
Ruffin adopted his ring name "Leon Ruff" to honor his grandfather Leon Ruffin. Ruff made his debut at Evolve 106 on June 23, 2018, teaming with Tommy Maserati in a losing effort against Adrian Alanis and Liam Gray. At Evolve 131 on July 13, 2019, Ruff and A. R. Fox defeated The UnWanted (Eddie Kingston and Joe Gacy) to win the Evolve Tag Team Championship. At Evolve 142 on December 7, Ruff and Fox lost the titles to Besties in the World (Davey Vega and Mat Fitchett), ending their reign at 147 days.

=== WWE (2019–2021) ===
Though not under contract, Ruff made an appearance on the December 4, 2019 episode of NXT, teaming with Adrian Alanis in a losing effort against The Forgotten Sons (Steve Cutler and Wesley Blake). Throughout early 2020, Ruff wrestled as a local competitor on a variety of WWE television programs including Raw, SmackDown, NXT, 205 Live, and Main Event.

On October 7, 2020, Ruff signed a contract with WWE and was assigned to the WWE Performance Center. On the November 11 episode of NXT, Ruff defeated Johnny Gargano to win the NXT North American Championship after he was chosen as Gargano's opponent by a roulette-style spinning wheel. The following week on NXT, Ruff retained the championship against Gargano via disqualification when Damian Priest, Gargano's rival, intentionally punched Ruff. At NXT TakeOver: WarGames, Ruff lost the title back to Gargano in a triple threat match also involving Priest, ending Ruff's reign at 25 days. On the December 30 episode of NXT, Ruff faced Gargano in a rematch for the title but was defeated.

Leon Ruff would begin teaming with Kushida and both men would enter the 2021 Dusty Rhodes Tag Team Classic. In the first round, Ruff and Kushida would defeat The Way (Johnny Gargano and Austin Theory) on the January 20 episode of NXT. On the January 27 episode of NXT, Ruff and Kushida would lose to The Grizzled Young Veterans in the quarterfinals. On the February 17 episode of NXT, Ruff would begin feuding with Isaiah "Swerve" Scott after Ruff defeated him in a match but was attacked by Scott afterwards. On the February 24 episode of NXT, Ruff was attacked by Scott before his match with Tyler Rust. On the March 31 episode of NXT, Ruff would qualify for the gauntlet eliminator on night 1 of NXT Takeover: Stand & Deliver. At the event, Ruff was the first man eliminated in the match by Scott. On the April 13 episode of NXT, Ruff would be defeated by Scott in a one on one match and backstage after the match, Ruff would attack Scott. The two fought once more on the May 4 episode of NXT with Ruff being defeated by Scott in a Falls Count Anywhere match due to interference from Top Dolla. On the May 11 episode of NXT, Ruff would be defeated by Pete Dunne despite attacking Dunne before the match had begun. On August 6, Ruff was released from his WWE contract. His final match took place the same night with a win over Grayson Waller on 205 Live.

=== Game Changer Wrestling (2021) ===
Leon Ruff made his GCW debut on November 11, 2021, in Detroit, Michigan with a win in a 5-Way Scramble Match.

=== All Elite Wrestling (2022) ===
On the May 1, 2022 taping of AEW Dark, Ruff made his debut for All Elite Wrestling facing Tony Nese in a losing effort. He made his televised debut on the June 17 episode of AEW Rampage, teaming with Bear Country in a losing effort against The Gunn Club and Max Caster. He made a further appearance on the July 6 episode of AEW Dynamite teaming again with Bear Country and Fuego Del Sol in a losing effort to The Gunn Club, Caster, and Anthony Bowens.

== Personal life ==
Ruffin is currently married to WWE referee Aja Smith. They became engaged on November 30, 2020 and married on September 4th, 2022. They have a dog named Juni.

== Championships and accomplishments ==
- Evolve
  - Evolve Tag Team Championship (1 time) – with A. R. Fox
- Pro Wrestling Illustrated
  - Ranked No. 165 of the top 500 singles wrestlers in the PWI 500 in 2021
- WWE
  - NXT North American Championship (1 time)
