= Merrionette Park, Illinois =

- Village
- Flag Seal

- Location of Merrionette Park in Cook County, Illinois.

- Location within Greater Chicago Location within Illinois Location within the United States
- Coordinates: 41°41′N 87°42′W
- Country: United States
- State: Illinois
- County: Cook
- Township: Worth
- Incorporated: 1947

Government
  - Type: Village
  - President: Jose Nevarez Jr. (Ind.)

Area
  - Total: 0.37 sq mi (0.97 km^{2})
  - Land: 0.37 sq mi (0.97 km^{2})
  - Water: 0 sq mi (0.00 km^{2}) 0%

Population (2020)
  - Total: 1,969
  - Density: 5,249/sq mi (2,026.7/km^{2})

Standard of living (2007-11)
  - Per capita income: $24,980
  - Median home value: $125,000
- ZIP code(s): 60803
- Area code(s): 708
- Geocode: 48554
- FIPS code: 17-48554
- Website: merrionettepark.org

Merrionette Park is a village in Cook County, Illinois, United States. The population was 1,969 as of the 2020 census.

== Geography ==
Merrionette Park is located at 41°41′N 87°42′W (41.684, -87.701).

According to the 2021 census gazetteer files, Merrionette Park has a total area of 0.38 square miles (0.98 km^{2}), all land.

== Demographics ==
Historical population
Census	Pop.	Note	%±
1950	1,101		—
1960	2,354		113.8%
1970	2,303		−2.2%
1980	2,054		−10.8%
1990	2,065		0.5%
2000	1,999		−3.2%
2010	1,900		−5.0%
2020	1,969		3.6%
U.S. Decennial Census; 2010 2020

=== Racial and ethnic composition ===
Merrionette Park village, Illinois – Racial and ethnic composition Note: the US Census treats Hispanic/Latino as an ethnic category. This table excludes Latinos from the racial categories and assigns them to a separate category. Hispanics/Latinos may be of any race.
Race / Ethnicity (NH = Non-Hispanic)	Pop 2000	Pop 2010	Pop 2020	% 2000	% 2010	% 2020
White alone (NH)	1,753	1,435	1,153	87.69%	75.53%	58.56%
Black or African American alone (NH)	132	189	347	6.60%	9.95%	17.62%
Native American or Alaska Native alone (NH)	0	2	4	0.00%	0.11%	0.20%
Asian alone (NH)	10	19	21	0.50%	1.00%	1.07%
Pacific Islander alone (NH)	0	1	0	0.00%	0.05%	0.00%
Other race alone (NH)	1	0	6	0.05%	0.00%	0.30%
Mixed race or Multiracial (NH)	20	25	59	1.00%	1.32%	3.00%
Hispanic or Latino (any race)	83	229	379	4.15%	12.05%	19.25%
Total	1,999	1,900	1,969	100.00%	100.00%	100.00%

=== 2020 census ===
As of the 2020 census, there were 1,969 people, 939 households, and 371 families residing in the village. The population density was 5,250.67 inhabitants per square mile (2,027.30/km^{2}). There were 992 housing units at an average density of 2,645.33 per square mile (1,021.37/km^{2}).

The median age was 42.2 years. 18.6% of residents were under the age of 18 and 16.4% of residents were 65 years of age or older. For every 100 females there were 90.8 males, and for every 100 females age 18 and over there were 90.7 males.

100.0% of residents lived in urban areas, while 0.0% lived in rural areas.

Of the 939 households, 25.7% had children under the age of 18 living in them. Of all households, 29.2% were married-couple households, 27.1% were households with a male householder and no spouse or partner present, and 36.1% were households with a female householder and no spouse or partner present. About 40.5% of all households were made up of individuals, and 15.3% had someone living alone who was 65 years of age or older.

There were 992 housing units, of which 5.3% were vacant. The homeowner vacancy rate was 0.8% and the rental vacancy rate was 5.9%.

=== Income and poverty ===
The median income for a household in the village was $43,047, and the median income for a family was $83,309. Males had a median income of $35,792 versus $34,375 for females. The per capita income for the village was $27,153. About 3.2% of families and 8.1% of the population were below the poverty line, including 4.5% of those under age 18 and 12.8% of those age 65 or over.

== Government ==
Merrionette Park is in Illinois's 3rd congressional district.

The Merrionette Park Fire Department provides fire protection and emergency medical services within the village. The department was established on May 23, 1949, after an ordinance was adopted in the village's municipal code to create a fire department. Prior to the formation of the Merrionette Park Fire Department, fire protection was provided by Blue Island and Chicago fire departments.

The Merrionette Park Police Department provides police protection within the village. The department was established in 1947, hiring its first full time police officers in 2023.

== Recreation ==
Merrionette Park is home to the Merrionette Park baseball fields, where children of all ages play every summer. Merrionette Park Baseball is a volunteer organization. There is also a small park in the village once named for long time village resident Harry J. Rogowski but was renamed Patriot Park in 2022.

== Transportation ==
CTA provides bus service on Route 52A connecting Merrionette Park to destinations across the Southland.
