= WWNLive Mercury Rising =

World Wrestling Network pay-per-view series

Mercury Rising is an annual professional wrestling pay-per-view (PPV) event currently produced by the World Wrestling Network (WWN) under the name WWNLive Supershow: Mercury Rising. The event takes place during WrestleMania weekend, at a venue in the same metropolitan area the WrestleMania is held, and features talent from WWN's affiliate promotions, including EVOLVE, Full Impact Pro and SHINE.

From 2010 to 2014, Mercury Rising events were promoted by WWN affiliate Dragon Gate USA. In December 2014, WWN confirmed they were putting the Dragon Gate USA brand on an indefinite hiatus.

== DGUSA Mercury Rising ==
=== 2010 ===
DGUSA Mercury Rising 2010
- Promotion: Dragon Gate USA
- Date: March 27, 2010
- City: Phoenix, Arizona
- Venue: Celebrity Theatre

Mercury Rising chronology
← Previous —	Next → DGUSA Mercury Rising 2011

No.	Results	Stipulations
1	TJP defeated Brad Allen	Singles match
2	CHIKARA Sekigun (Jigsaw & Mike Quackenbush) defeated The Young Bucks (Matt Jackson & Nick Jackson)	Tag Team match
3	SHINGO defeated Genki Horiguchi	Singles match
4	Jack Evans & Jimmy Jacobs defeated Brian Kendrick & Paul London	Tag Team Match
5	Jon Moxley defeated Tommy Dreamer	Hardcore match
6	YAMATO (c) defeated Susumu Yokosuka	Open the Dream Gate Championship Title match
7	WORLD-1 (BxB Hulk, Masato Yoshino & Naruki Doi) defeated WARRIORS (CIMA, Dragon Kid & Gamma)	Six Man Tag Team Match
(c) / – the champion(s) heading into the match

=== 2011 ===
DGUSA Mercury Rising 2011
- Promotion: Dragon Gate USA
- Date: April 2, 2011
- City: Atlanta, Georgia
- Venue: Presidential Ballroom

Mercury Rising chronology
← Previous; DGUSA Mercury Rising 2010	Next → DGUSA Mercury Rising 2012

No.	Results	Stipulations
1	Jon Moxley (with Trina Michaels & Val Malone) defeated Arik Cannon	Singles match
2	Brodie Lee defeated A. R. Fox, Jimmy Jacobs, Jon Davis, Silas Young & Stalker Ichikawa	Six Way Elimination match
3	Masato Yoshino defeated Sami Callihan	Singles match
4	PAC (c) (with Masato Yoshino) defeated Akira Tozawa	Open the Brave Gate Championship Title match
5	Charade & Danny Steel vs. Sin City Saints (Billy Rayz & Scotty Rayz) ended in a no contest	Tag Team match
6	YAMATO (c) defeated Austin Aries	Open the Freedom Gate Championship Title match
7	Blood Warriors (CIMA, Naruki Doi & Ricochet) defeated Ronin (Chuck Taylor, Johnny Gargano, and Rich Swann)	Six Man Tag Team match
(c) / – the champion(s) heading into the match

=== 2012 ===
DGUSA Mercury Rising 2012
- Promotion: Dragon Gate USA
- Date: March 31, 2012
- City: Miami Beach, Florida
- Venue: Deauville Beach Resort

Mercury Rising chronology
← Previous; DGUSA Mercury Rising 2011	Next → DGUSA Mercury Rising 2013

No.	Results	Stipulations
1	Bobby Fish defeated Jon Davis	Singles match
2	A. R. Fox defeated Arik Cannon (with Pinkie Sanchez) by DQ	Singles match
3	Sabu defeated Sami Callihan	Street Fight
4	El Generico defeated Chuck Taylor, CIMA, Lince Dorado, Rich Swann & Samuray del Sol	Six Way match
5	The Scene (Caleb Konley & Scott Reed) (with Amber O'Neal, Larry Dallas & Shelly Martinez defeated Los Ben Dejos (Ben Dejo & Marty Con Dejo)	Tag Team match
6	Johnny Gargano (c) (with Rich Swann) defeated Masato Yoshino	Open the Freedom Gate Championship Title match
7	Low Ki & MB (Akira Tozawa & BxB Hulk) (with Christina Von Eerie) defeated Masaaki Mochizuki & WORLD-1 International (PAC & Ricochet)	Six Man Tag Team match
(c) / – the champion(s) heading into the match

=== 2013 ===
DGUSA Mercury Rising 2013
- Promotion: Dragon Gate USA
- Date: April 7, 2013
- City: Secaucus, New Jersey
- Venue: Meadowlands Expo Center

Mercury Rising chronology
← Previous; DGUSA Mercury Rising 2012	Next → DGUSA Mercury Rising 2014

No.	Results	Stipulations
1	Amasis defeated Mikey Webb	Singles match
2	Anthony Nese (with Mr. A) defeated Soldier Ant (with Fire Ant)	Singles match
3	Scott Reed (with Larry Dallas and Trina Michaels) defeated Caleb Konley	Singles match
4	The Super Smash Brothers (Player Uno & Player Dos) defeated DUF (Arik Cannon & Sami Callihan)	Tag Team match
5	Brian Kendrick defeated Chuck Taylor (with Nolan Angus, Orange Cassidy and The Swamp Monster)	Singles match
6	Uhaa Nation defeated A. R. Fox, Christina Von Eerie, Facade, Matt Jackson, Nick Jackson & Samuray del Sol	Ladders Are Legal Seven Way Fray
7	Orange Cassidy (with Chuck Taylor, Drew Gulak & The Swamp Monster) defeated Jon Davis by disqualification	Singles match
8	Johnny Gargano, Rich Swann & Ricochet defeated CIMA, Eita & Tomahawk TT	Six Man Tag Team Match
9	SHINGO defeated Akira Tozawa	Singles match

=== 2014 ===
DGUSA Mercury Rising 2014
- Promotion: Dragon Gate USA
- Date: April 5, 2014
- City: New Orleans, Louisiana
- Venue: McAlister Auditorium

Mercury Rising chronology
← Previous; DGUSA Mercury Rising 2013	Next → WWNLive Mercury Rising 2015

No.	Results	Stipulations
1	Kennedy Kendrick defeated Purple Haze	Singles match
2	Ricky Starks defeated Wayne Van Dyke	Singles match
3	A. R. Fox, Rich Swann & Ricochet defeated Chris Hero, Masato Tanaka & Roderick Strong	Six Man Tag Team Tournament Semi Final Match
4	Chuck Taylor vs. Maxwell Chicago ended in a no contest	Singles match
5	The Premier Athlete Brand (Anthony Nese, Caleb Konley & Trent Barreta) (with Mr. A & Su Yung) defeated Biff Busick, Chuck Taylor & Teddy Hart (with Larry Dallas & Mister Money)	Six Man Tag Team Tournament Semi Final Match
6	Lince Dorado & The Colony (Fire Ant & Green Ant) defeated Moose & The Bravado Brothers (Harlem Bravado & Lancelot Bravado)	Six Man Tag Team Tournament Semi Final Match
7	Ivelisse (c) defeated Mercedes Martinez	SHINE title match
8	Low Ki defeated Johnny Gargano	Singles match
9	The Premier Athlete Brand (Anthony Nese, Caleb Konley & Trent Barreta) (with Mr. A & Su Yung) defeated A. R. Fox, Rich Swann & Ricochet and Fire Ant, Green Ant & Lince Dorado	Six Man Tag Team Tournament Final Three Way Elimination Match
10	Bad Influence (Christopher Daniels & Kazarian) defeated The Bravado Brothers (Harlem Bravado & Lancelot Bravado)	Dark Tag Team Match
(c) / – the champion(s) heading into the match

== WWNLive Mercury Rising ==
=== 2015 ===
WWNLive Supershow: Mercury Rising 2015
- Promotion: WWNLive
- Date: March 28, 2015
- City: San Jose, California
- Venue: Santa Clara County Fairgrounds

Mercury Rising chronology
← Previous; DGUSA Mercury Rising 2014	Next → WWNLive Supershow: Mercury Rising 2016

No.	Results	Stipulations	Times
1	Ethan Page defeated Caleb Konley (with Andrea, Brian Cage & SoCal Val)	Singles match	11:22
2	Mia Yim and The Kimber Bombs (Cherry Bomb & Kimber Lee) defeated Andrea and The Canadian NINJAs (Nicole Matthews & Portia Perez)	Six Woman Tag Team match	11:53
3	Drew Galloway (c – EVOLVE) defeated Johnny Gargano (with Ethan Page) (c – Freedom Gate)	EVOLVE Championship / Open the Freedom Gate Championship Title match	21:13
4	T. J. Perkins defeated Biff Busick and Drew Gulak and Tommy End	Four Way match	11:35
5	PJ Black defeated A. R. Fox	Singles match	10:06
6	Timothy Thatcher defeated Chris Hero	Singles match	21:32
7	Generation Next (Austin Aries & Roderick Strong) defeated Ricochet and Uhaa Nation	Tag Team match	18:05

=== 2016 ===
WWNLive Supershow: Mercury Rising 2016
- Promotion: WWNLive
- Date: April 2, 2016
- City: Dallas, Texas
- Venue: Eddie Deen's Ranch

Mercury Rising chronology
← Previous; WWNLive Supershow: Mercury Rising 2015	Next → WWNLive Supershow: Mercury Rising 2017

No.	Results	Stipulations	Times
1	Chris Hero defeated Zack Sabre Jr.	Singles match	26:51
2	Drew Gulak (with Matt Riddle, TJP & Tracy Williams) defeated Fred Yehi	Singles match	09:20
3	Tracy Williams defeated Matt Riddle	Singles match	12:41
4	Ethan Page defeated Anthony Nese	Anything Goes match	13:09
5	Taylor Made (c) (with Andrea & SoCal Val) defeated Nicole Matthews	Shine Championship Title match	08:02
6	Caleb Konley (c) (with Andrea & SoCal Val) defeated Gary Jay and Jason Cade and Maxwell Chicago	FIP World Heavyweight Championship; Four Way Title match	13:13
7	Timothy Thatcher (c) defeated Sami Callihan	Evolve Championship Title match	16:22
8	Johnny Gargano, Kota Ibushi & TJP (with Stokely Hathaway) defeated Marty Scurll, Tommy End & Will Ospreay	Six Man Tag Team match	22:47
(c) / – the champion(s) heading into the match

=== 2017 ===
WWNLive Supershow: Mercury Rising 2017
- Promotion: WWNLive
- Date: April 1, 2017
- City: Orlando, Florida
- Venue: Orlando Live Events

Mercury Rising chronology
← Previous; WWNLive Supershow: Mercury Rising 2016	Next → —

No.	Results	Stipulations	Times
1	Keith Lee defeated Jason Kincaid, Austin Theory and Blaster McMassive	Four way match	6:06
2	LuFisto (c) defeated Toni Storm	Shine Championship match	7:25
3	Ethan Page defeated Jimmy Havoc	Singles match	10:30
4	Travis Banks & TK Cooper defeated Chris Dickinson & Jaka	Tag team match	15:10
5	Pete Dunne (c) defeated A. C. H.	Progress Championship match	18:40
6	Zack Sabre Jr. (c) defeated Mark Haskins	Evolve Championship match	19:52
7	Matt Riddle defeated Tracy Williams, Fred Yehi, Timothy Thatcher, Jon Davis and Parrow	"Battle of Champions" elimination match to become the first WWN Champion	28:06
(c) / – the champion(s) heading into the match

=== 2018 ===
WWNLive Supershow: Mercury Rising 2018
- Promotion: WWNLive
- Date: April 8, 2018
- City: New Orleans, Louisiana
- Venue: Pontchartrain Center

Mercury Rising chronology
← Previous; WWNLive Supershow: Mercury Rising 2017	Next → —

No.	Results	Stipulations
1	A. R. Fox, DJ Z & Trey Miguel defeated Austin Theory, Travis Banks & Zachary Wentz	Six Man Tag Team match
2	Zack Sabre Jr. defeated Munenori Sawa	Singles match
3	Anthony Henry & James Drake defeated Dominic Garrini & “Hot Sauce” Tracy Williams & Odinson & Parrow	Triple threat tag team match
4	LuFisto (c) defeated Holidead	Shine Championship match
5	Daisuke Sekimoto defeated Keith Lee	Singles match
6	Chris Dickinson & Jaka (c) defeated Timothy Thatcher & WALTER	Evolve Tag Team Championship match
7	Matt Riddle (c) defeated Will Ospreay	Evolve Championship match
(c) / – the champion(s) heading into the match

=== 2019 ===
WWNLive Supershow: Mercury Rising 2019
- Promotion: WWNLive
- Date: April 5, 2019
- City: New York, New York
- Venue: La Boom

Mercury Rising chronology
← Previous; WWNLive Supershow: Mercury Rising 2018	Next → —

No.	Results	Stipulations
1	Anthony Henry (c) defeated Absolute Andy	Singles match for the FIP World Heavyweight Championship
2	Anthony Greene defeated Barrett Brown, Colby Corino, Cyrus Satin, Harlem Bravado, John Silver and Shotzi Blackheart	Seven-way elimination match
3	Miyu Yamashita (TJPW) defeated Allysin Kay (Shine)	Singles match for the Tokyo Princess of Princess Championship and for the Shine Championship
4	Austin Theory and Brandi Lauren defeated Darby Allin and Priscilla Kelly	Tag team match
5	The Unwanted (Eddie Kingston, Joe Gacy and Shane Strickland) defeated Team wXw (Alexander James, Jurn Simmons and Marius Al-Ani)	Six-man tag team match
6	JD Drake (c) defeated Kazusada Higuchi	Singles match for the WWN Championship
7	Damnation (Daisuke Sasaki, Soma Takao and Tetsuya Endo) defeated The Skulk (Adrian Alanis, A. R. Fox and Leon Ruff)	Six-man tag team match
(c) / – the champion(s) heading into the match
