= Evolve 131 =

2019 Evolve and WWE Network event

- Promotional poster featuring various Evolve and WWE wrestlers
- Promotion: Evolve
- Date: July 13, 2019
- City: Philadelphia, Pennsylvania
- Venue: 2300 Arena

Evolve chronology
← Previous; Evolve 130	Next → Evolve 132

Evolve 131, also known as Evolve's 10th Anniversary Celebration, was a professional wrestling livestreaming event produced by the American promotion Evolve in partnership with WWE. The event aired on the WWE Network, making it the first Evolve show and the first independent wrestling show to broadcast live on the platform. It took place on July 13, 2019, at the 2300 Arena in Philadelphia, Pennsylvania. The show featured current Evolve wrestlers and alumni, as well as wrestlers from WWE's NXT and 205 Live brand divisions.

== Production ==
=== Background ===
In October 2008, Gabe Sapolsky, long-time booker of Ring of Honor, was released from the promotion. In 2009, Sapolsky founded Dragon Gate USA, with the group holding its inaugural event on July 25 of that year. The following year, Sapolsky founded Dragon Gate USA's sister group, Evolve.

In 2015, WWE entered into a partnership with Evolve, with the smaller promotion being used as a scouting group for WWE's developmental brands. In 2017, WWE began exploring deals that would see content from independent wrestling promotions (such as Progress and ICW) air on their WWE Network streaming service.

Over two years later, WWE announced that Evolve's 10th Anniversary Celebration, an event celebrating the 10th anniversary of Dragon Gate USA's founding, would air live on the WWE Network on July 13, 2019, broadcasting from the 2300 Arena in Philadelphia, Pennsylvania. This marked the first Evolve event and the first independent wrestling event to air on the WWE Network.

=== Storylines ===
The card included matches resulting from scripted storylines. Results were predetermined by WWE's writers on the NXT and 205 Live brands, while storylines were produced on WWE's weekly television programs, NXT and 205 Live, and on Evolve events.

On June 26, it was announced that Adam Cole would defend the NXT Championship against Akira Tozawa, a wrestler dubbed the "Dragon Gate USA MVP" by WWNLive.com. It was also announced on June 26 that WWE Cruiserweight Champion Drew Gulak would face former Evolve Champion and current NXT wrestler Matt Riddle in a non-title match. The two wrestlers had previously been a part of the Catch Point stable during their tenures in Evolve.

On July 2, it was announced that JD Drake would face Austin Theory in a Winner Takes All match for both the WWN and Evolve Championships. Additionally it was announced that Eddie Kingston and Joe Gacy would defend the Evolve Tag Team Championship against A. R. Fox and Leon Ruff.

== Results ==
No.	Results	Stipulations	Times
1	Josh Briggs defeated Anthony Greene (with Brandi Lauren)	Singles match The Future Is Now Showcase match	11:49
2	Stephen Wolf defeated Curt Stallion, Sean Maluta, and Harlem Bravado	Fatal four-way match	9:19
3	Arturo Ruas defeated Anthony Henry	Grudge match	9:45
4	Brandi Lauren defeated Shotzi Blackheart	No Disqualification match	9:49
5	Babatunde defeated Colby Corino	Singles match Special Challenge match	3:09
6	A. R. Fox and Leon Ruff (with Ayla and The Skulk) defeated The UnWanted (Eddie Kingston and Joe Gacy) (c)	Tag team match for the Evolve Tag Team Championship	5:25
7	Matt Riddle (with Curt Stallion) defeated Drew Gulak	Singles match Catch Point Reunion match	13:37
8	Austin Theory (c – Evolve) defeated JD Drake (c – WWN)	Winner Takes All match for both the WWN Championship and Evolve Championship	16:22
9	Adam Cole (c) defeated Akira Tozawa	Singles match for the NXT Championship	13:15
(c) / – the champion(s) heading into the match

== See also ==
- List of Evolve Wrestling events
