= Joe Gacy =

American professional wrestler (born 1987)

- Gacy in August 2026

Personal information
- Born: Joseph Ruby; August 8, 1987 (age 39) Franklinville, New Jersey, U.S.
- Spouse: Aimee Benozich (m. 2019)

Professional wrestling career
- Ring name(s): Joe Gacy; Psycho Joe; Xerox; Joseph Sawyer
- Billed height: 6 ft 0 in (183 cm)
- Billed weight: 249 lb (113 kg)
- Billed from: Batsto, New Jersey; Planet Terror; The Last House on the Left
- Trained by: CZW Wrestling Academy; D. J. Hyde; Jon Dahmer
- Debut: July 29, 2006

Joseph Ruby (born August 8, 1987) is an American professional wrestler. He is signed to Total Nonstop Action Wrestling (TNA), where he performs under the ring name Joseph Sawyer and is a member of the syX stable. He also makes appearances on the independent circuit. He is best known for his tenure in WWE, where he performed under the ring name Joe Gacy.

Gacy first gained prominence for his work in Combat Zone Wrestling (CZW), where he was a three-time CZW World Heavyweight Champion and a three-time CZW Wired Champion. He also appeared for Evolve, where he was a one-time Evolve Tag Team Champion.

== Professional wrestling career ==
=== Combat Zone Wrestling (2006–2020) ===
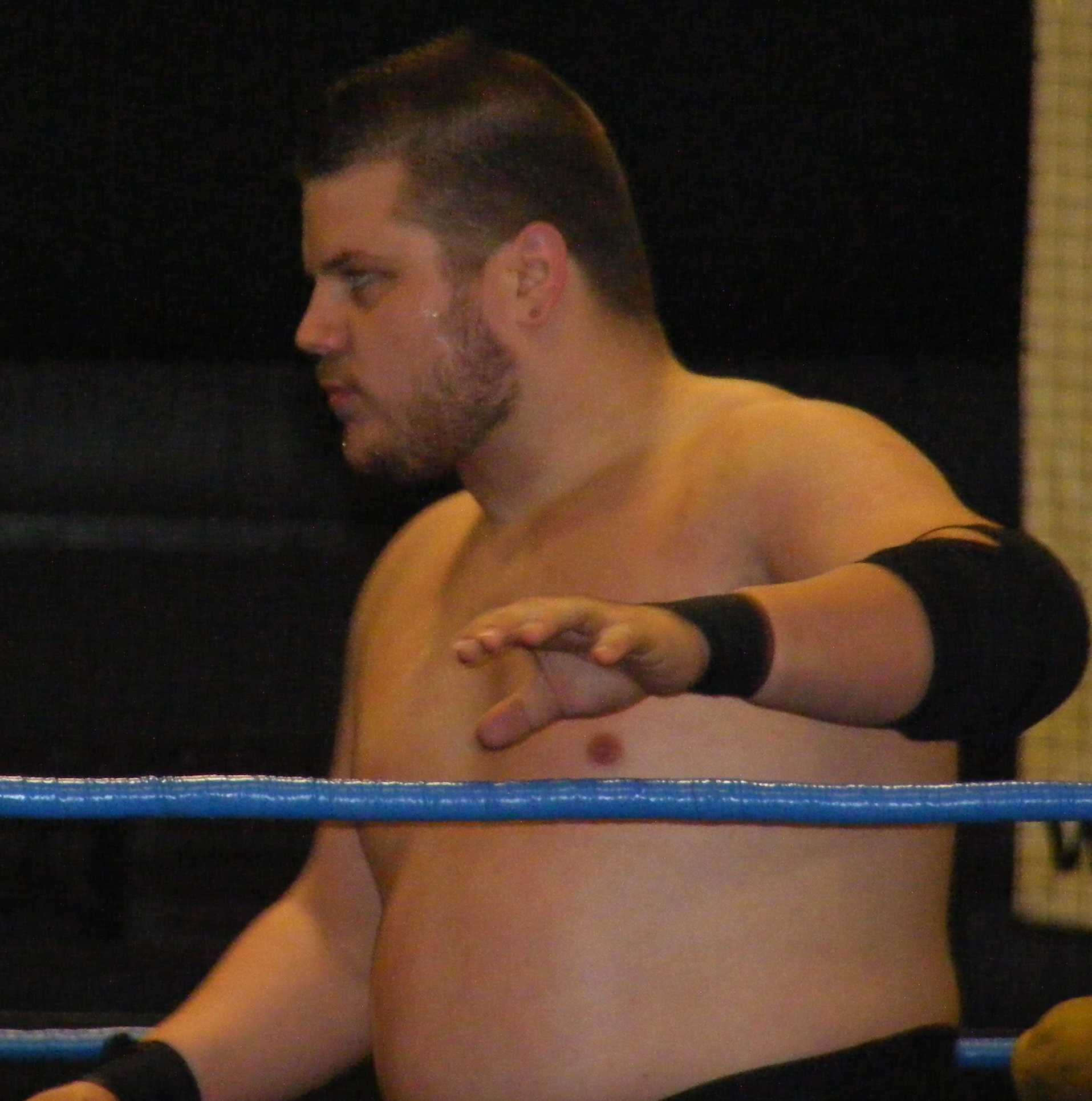
Gacy in 2010

On July 29, 2006 at Combat Zone Wrestling (CZW), Ruby made his professional wrestling debut as Joe Gacy, losing to George W. Baus. Gacy continued to appear for CZW in various matches for the next 14 years.

On August 5, 2017, at Once in a Lifetime, Gacy appeared at the event, while ring announcer Larry Legend was about to introduce the match between Lio Rush and Joey Janela. Gacy headbutted Legend, before criticising the direction CZW were going in, and then putting Legend through a barbed wire board. On November 11, at Night of Infamy, Gacy faced Strickland for the title, which he lost. On December 9, Gacy faced Page and Strickland and was During the match, Gacy was as thrown off the top by a masked man (revealed to be the debuting Anthony Gangone), onto a table with a pane of glass propped up on it, the match was won by Page.

On November 30, in a backstage segment at Night of Infamy, D. J. Hyde offered to face Gacy at Cage of Death XXI, with his career on the line. Hyde's rival Maven Bentley disagreed, and told Hyde to find someone who would wrestle on his behalf to face Gacy instead. On December 14, Gacy faced Hyde's representative in Matt Tremont, which Gacy won. In the resulting aftermath, Gacy was embraced by Bentley, and was then challenged for a future title shot by Alex Shelley.

=== Independent circuit (2007–2020) ===
While primarily appearing for CZW, Gacy also made appearances for various inpendent promotions such as Side Show Pro Wrestling (SSP) and Game Changer Wrestling (GCW), under the names Xerox and Psycho Joe.

=== Evolve (2018–2020) ===
Gacy made his first appearance for Evolve in a tag team match on September 8, 2018, at Evolve 112. He tagged alongside Steve Pena, in a defeat to Facade and Jason Kincaid. His first match as a singles competitor was in a defeat to Adrian Jaoude, on October 28, at Evolve 114. His first win came against Colby Corino on January 18, 2019, at Evolve 116.

On February 16, at Evolve 122, following the title match between JD Drake and Montez Ford, Eddie Kingston jumped both wrestlers, and was joined in the post-match attack by Gacy, Corino and Shane Strickland, and in the process, forming The Unwanted. On 15 March, at Evolve 123, Gacy and Kingston defeated the Street Profits for the Evolve Tag Team Championship, ending the NXT tag team's reign at 138 days. During WrestleMania weekend, on April 4, at Evolve 125, Gacy and Kingston defeated the DDT pairing of Konosuke Takeshita and Mao. On May 10, at Evolve 127, Gacy was defeated by Drake in a title match for the WWN Championship. The following day, at Evolve 128, Gacy and Kingston defeated Drake and Anthony Henry, in which Drake took the pin after Henry walked out on him. On June 29, at Evolve 129, Gacy and Kingston defeated the pairing of Anthony Greene and Curt Stallion, in which Gacy hit Stallion with a right hand, allowing Kingston to suplex him for the victory.

On June 20, at Evolve 130, Gacy and Kingston interfered in the title match between Drake and Babatunde, resulting in a no-contest. They continued the beatdown, until Drake and Babatunde were able to separate them and give them a round of chops. Gacy and Kingston then ran to the back, while Babatunde chased after them. Later that night, Gacy and Kingston were involved in non-title four-way elimination tag team match, alongside A. R. Fox and Leon Ruff, The Beaver Boys (Alex Reynolds and John Silver) and Milk Chocolate (Brandon Watts and Randy Summers). The final two teams came down to The Unwanted and Fox and Ruff, and ended when Fox landed a coast-to-coast to Gacy, which led to Ruff hitting a Ruff Ride, followed by a 450 splash by Fox on Kingston for the victory. Afterwards, Gacy and Kingston attacked Fox and Ruff from behind, and Babutunde came out from the back and was about to perform a double chokeslam on The Unwanted, until Corino and Sean Maluta came out to make the save, resulting in a beatdown. On July 13, at Evolve 131, Fox and Ruff defeated Gacy and Kingston for the Evolve Tag Team Championship, ending The Unwanted's reign at 120 days.

=== Westside Xtreme Wrestling (2020) ===
On March 8, 2020, at the wXwNOW Showcase during wXw 16 Carat Gold, Gacy defeated Anthony Greene in a non-title match, with a discus lariat.

=== WWE (2020–2026) ===
==== NXT (2020–2024) ====
On August 31, 2020, it was reported that Gacy had signed a contract with WWE, following the company's purchase of Evolve in July. On October 7, WWE announced that he had reported for training at the Performance Center, alongside five other professional wrestlers from Evolve. On the July 2, 2021, episode of 205 Live, Gacy made his television debut, defeating Desmond Troy to qualify for the 2021 NXT Breakout Tournament. On the August 3 episode of NXT, Gacy was eliminated in the first round by Trey Baxter.

On the September 21 episode of NXT, Gacy began a new gimmick, portraying a politically correct spokesperson who "wants to make NXT his safe space", therefore establishing himself as a heel. He was later defeated by Cameron Grimes. On the October 5 episode of NXT, he defeated Ikemen Jiro and proceeded to give him a hug afterwards. Gacy formed an alliance with Harland who began accompanying him to the ring as his bodyguard. On the November 23 episode of NXT 2.0, he convinced the Cruiserweight Champion Roderick Strong to grant him a match for the Cruiserweight Championship at NXT WarGames, despite not weighing 205 pounds or below. At War Games, Gacy was unsuccessful at capturing the title. In April 2022, Gacy began feuding with the NXT Champion Bron Breakker after he and Harland kidnapped Breakker's father, Rick Steiner. Gacy's character began to morph into a dark and sadistic cult-like leader. A title match between Gacy and Breakker was later made official for Spring Breakin' on May 3, 2022. Gacy would fail to capture the championship. Gacy eventually challenged Breakker for a rematch at NXT In Your House, with the stipulation that if Breakker gets disqualified, he loses the NXT Championship. Gacy would fail to capture the championship yet again.

On the July 19, 2022 episode of NXT 2.0, Gacy revealed the druids' identities as the Dyad, consisting of Jagger Reid and Rip Fowler, formerly known as James Drake and Zack Gibson of the Grizzled Young Veterans respectively. Collectively, Gacy and the Dyad were known as Schism, and they began a feud with Cameron Grimes. During this rivalry, the debuting Ava Raine, would join Schism and cost Grimes in his final match with Gacy on the November 8th episode of NXT, ending the feud. Gacy competed in the Men's Iron Survivor match at NXT Deadline, but was unsuccessful in becoming number one contender. The Schism stable would slowly begin to disband in September 2023, starting with the expiration of The Dyad's contracts on September 14, and culminating in a backstage segment at NXT No Mercy where Gacy declared the Schism to be "dead", which was followed up by Ava posting a cryptic tweet simply saying "goodbye" to NXT.

During the Second week of NXT Halloween Havoc, on October 31, 2023, Gacy appeared in a vignette possibly hinting at a new character change. Over the following weeks, he would appear in segments which included him appearing out of a car trunk, also posing as a construction worker. On the January 16, 2024 episode of NXT, Gacy was part of the commentary table providing color commentary alongside Booker T and Vic Joseph during the match between Dijak and Trey Bearhill. During the match, Dijak verbally insulted Booker T and Joseph, and knocked Gacy's headphone off while Gacy was standing up for Booker and Joseph. After the match, Gacy attacked Dijak, turning face and starting a feud with Dijak in the process. Gacy was defeated by Dijak in No Disqualification match at NXT Vengeance Day and again at NXT Roadblock in an Asylum match. At Stand & Deliver, Gacy was attacked by Ridge Holland with a chair, but Gacy told the referee he was still able to compete. Gacy ended up defeating Shawn Spears in his final match for NXT.

==== The Wyatt Sicks (2024–2026) ====
Gacy made his main roster debut on the June 17, 2024, episode of Raw as member of The Wyatt Sicks. Gacy would sport a pig mask, resembling Huskus the Pig Boy from Bray Wyatt's "Firefly Funhouse". On the August 5 episode of Raw, Gacy teamed with stablemates Dexter Lumis and Erick Rowan to defeat American Made (Chad Gable and the Creed Brothers). On the September 9 episode of Raw, the Wyatt Sicks defeated American Made in a Street Fight, ending their feud.

The Wyatt Sicks' next feud was against The Miz and The Final Testament, facing each other on the December 9 episode of Raw, where the Wyatt Sicks suffered their first loss as a stable in an eight-man tag team match. The stable was drafted to the SmackDown brand, but didn't appear on television due to an injury to leader Uncle Howdy. The stable returned to television on the May 23 episode of SmackDown, attacking WWE Tag Team Champions the Street Profits, Fraxiom and DIY. On the July 11 episode of SmackDown, Gacy and Lumis defeated The Street Profits to win the WWE Tag Team Championship, marking Gacy's first championship in WWE. On night two of SummerSlam on August 3, Gacy and Lumis defended the titles in a six-pack tables, ladders, and chairs match against the Street Profits, DIY, Fraxiom, the Motor City Machine Guns, and Andrade and Rey Fénix, where they retained. On the January 23, 2026 episode of SmackDown, Lumis and Gacy lost the WWE Tag Team Championship to Solo Sikoa and Tama Tonga of The MFT. On April 24, Gacy and the rest of the members of the Wyatt Sicks were released by WWE.

=== Return to independent circuit (2026–present) ===
Ruby made his return to the independent wrestling scene on July 24, 2026 at Wrestling Revolver's Silence of The Slams, where he performed under the name Joseph Sawyer and defeated Rich Swann. The following day at Atomic Legacy Wrestling (ALW)'s event Star Spangled Slammer, Sawyer teamed with Samuel Shaw (formerly Dexter Lumis in WWE) to defeat Martin Stone and Ripper Zbyszko to become the number one contenders for the ALW Tag Team Championship. On August 7 at an Xcite Wrestling event, Sawyer defeated Anthony Gangone to capture the Xcite Wrestling Heavyweight Championship, his first title after his WWE release. On August 16 at GCW Homecoming Weekend: Night 1, Sawyer defeated Atticus Cogar to win the GCW World Championship. He lost the title back to Atticus on November 7, 2026 at The Crossroads in a No Rules match, ending his reign at 84 days.

=== Total Nonstop Action Wrestling (2026–present) ===
On September 24, 2026, episode of Thursday Night Impact!, Sawyer made his Total Nonstop Action Wrestling (TNA) debut alongside Samuel Shaw as the tag team syX, attacking the Hardys (Jeff Hardy and Matt Hardy) and revealing themselves as the perpetrators behind the mysterious attacks in the previous weeks. On October 11, at Bound for Glory, syX defeated the Hardys in a Falls count anywhere with the assistance of Erick Redbeard.

== Personal life ==
On October 13, 2019, Ruby married his girlfriend Aimee Benozich.

== Championships and accomplishments ==
Gacy is a one-time GCW World Champion.

- BriiCombination Wrestling
  - BCW Heavyweight Championship (1 time)
- Combat Zone Wrestling
  - CZW World Heavyweight Championship (3 times)
  - CZW Wired Championship (3 times)
- Dynamite Championship Wrestling
  - DCW No Limits Championship (1 time)
- East Coast Wrestling Association
  - ECWA Mid-Atlantic Heavyweight Championship (1 time)
- Evolve
  - Evolve Tag Team Championship (1 time) – with Eddie Kingston
- Game Changer Wrestling
  - GCW World Championship (1 time)
- Ground Breaking Wrestling
  - GBW World Championship (1 time)
  - GBW Breaker Championship (1 time)
- Maryland Championship Wrestling
  - MCW Rage Television Championship (2 times)
- New York Wrestling Connection
  - NYWC Fusion Championship (1 time)
- NWA Force One Pro Wrestling
  - F1 Heavyweight Championship (1 time)
  - F1 Tag Team Championship (1 time) – with Ryan Slater
- Pro Wrestling Illustrated
  - Ranked No. 199 of the top 500 singles wrestlers in the PWI 500 in 2020
- Real Championship Wrestling
  - RCW Tag Team Championship (1 time) – with Ryan Slater
- Vicious Outcast Wrestling
  - VOW Anarchy Championship (1 time)
- We Want Wrestling
  - We Want Wrestling Championship (1 time)
- WWE
  - WWE Tag Team Championship (1 time) – with Dexter Lumis
  - Slammy Award (1 Time)
    - WTF Moment of the Year (2025) Wyatt Sicks debut on RAW with Bo Dallas, Erick Rowan, Dexter Lumis and Nikki Cross
- Xcite Wrestling
  - Xcite Heavyweight Championship (3 times, current)
