= Style Battle =

- Acronym: SB
- Founded: 2017
- Defunct: September 2, 2020
- Style: Professional wrestling tournament
- Headquarters: Ybor City, Florida
- Founder(s): Gabe Sapolsky
- Owner(s): WWE (2020–present)
- Parent: WWE Legacy Department (WWE) (2020–present)
- Website: http://wwnlive.com/style-battle/

Style Battle was an American professional wrestling promotion founded in 2017 by former Ring of Honor booker and Dragon Gate USA vice president, Gabe Sapolsky. On November 22, 2016, it was announced that WWNLive would be debuting a new promotion named Style Battle on January 7, 2017.

== Series ==
Style Battle showed eight episodes in one series. Every episode was based on a one-night only tournament. The winners of the Style Battles have been: Dave Crist, Tracer X, Jon Davis, Jason Kincaid, Anthony Henry, Fred Yehi, Darby Allin and Matt Riddle.

== See also ==
- WWNLive
- List of independent wrestling promotions in the United States
