= Keith Lee (wrestler) =

American professional wrestler (born 1984)

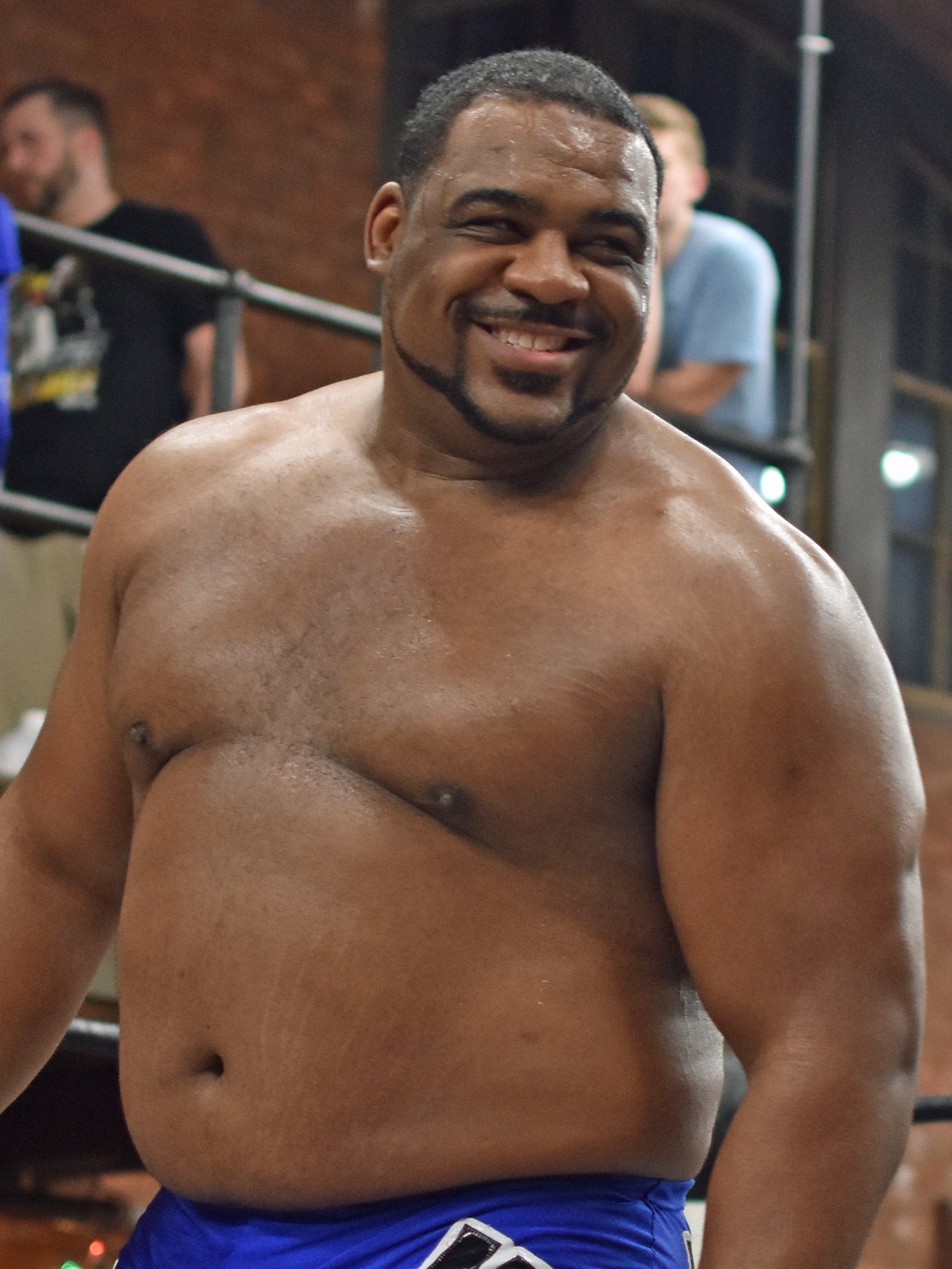
- Lee in 2018

Personal information
- Born: Keith Gerald Lee II; November 8, 1984 (age 41) Wichita Falls, Texas, U.S.
- Spouse: Mia Yim (m. 2022; div. 2025)

Professional wrestling career
- Ring name(s): Keith "Bearcat" Lee; Keith Lee; Kevin Paine
- Billed height: 6 ft 2 in (188 cm)
- Billed weight: 340 lb (154 kg)
- Billed from: Wichita Falls, Texas, U.S.
- Trained by: Tim Brooks; WWE Performance Center
- Debut: February 2005

Keith Gerald Lee II (born November 8, 1984) is an American professional wrestler. He is signed to All Elite Wrestling (AEW). He is on hiatus due to an injury. He is also known for his time in WWE and Ring of Honor (ROH), as well as on the independent circuit, in promotions such as Evolve, All American Wrestling (AAW), and Pro Wrestling Guerrilla (PWG).

Lee signed with WWE in May 2018 and was assigned to the developmental brand, NXT, where he won the NXT Championship and NXT North American Championship, and became the first person to hold both titles simultaneously. Lee began appearing on the Raw brand in August 2020, where he faced AJ Styles and Drew McIntyre in WWE Championship matches. Lee left WWE in November 2021, debuting in AEW the following February and winning the AEW World Tag Team Championship later that year.

== Early life ==
Lee was born Keith Gerald Lee II on November 8, 1984, in Wichita Falls, Texas. He was introduced to professional wrestling at a young age by his grandmother, who was a fan herself, and credits her with inspiring him to pursue a career in professional wrestling. Lee played college football at Texas A&M University, but quit to become a professional wrestler.

== Professional wrestling career ==
=== Early career (2005–2015) ===
Lee was trained by Tim Brooks and debuted on the independent circuit in 2005 under the ring name "Kevin Paine". In 2008, he began wrestling under his birth name. For the first 10 years of his career, Lee wrestled almost exclusively in his home state of Texas, appearing with promotions such as Professional Championship Wrestling (Arlington); Xtreme Championship Wrestling (Denton); North American Wrestling Allegiance (Waxahachie); Metroplex Wrestling (Bedford); and River City Wrestling (San Antonio). During this time, Lee won the North American Wrestling Allegiance Tag Team Championship with Li Fang and the Xtreme Championship Wrestling Heavyweight Championship and TNT Championship. Beginning in 2015, Lee began wrestling more frequently outside of Texas.

=== Ring of Honor (2015–2017) ===
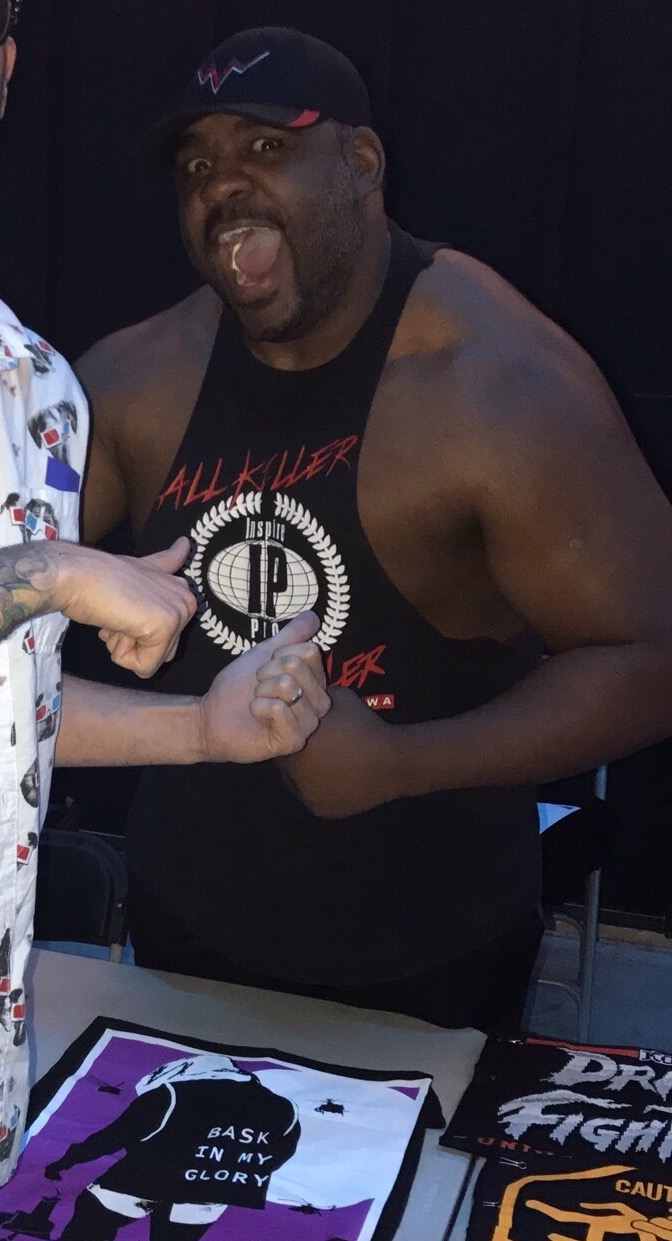
Lee in August 2017

During 2015, Lee started making appearances in Ring of Honor (ROH) with Shane Taylor, calling themselves "Pretty Boy Killers" (PBK). On August 27, 2016, during Field of Honor, PBK participated in a gauntlet tag team match for the ROH World Tag Team Championship, but the match was won by The Addiction (Christopher Daniels and Frankie Kazarian). At All Star Extravaganza VIII, PBK wrestled against the All Night Express (Rhett Titus and Kenny King), War Machine (Hanson and Raymond Rowe) and the team of Colt Cabana and Dalton Castle in a Four Corner Survival match to determine the number one contender for the ROH tag team championship, in a losing effort. In January 2017, Taylor announced that he had signed his first contract with Ring of Honor. At a January 14 show in Atlanta, PBK entered into a feud with the Briscoe Brothers when Lee and Taylor attacked them and slammed Jay Briscoe through a table. Surprisingly, the next day, Lee announced that he was leaving ROH. On February 3, 2017, they faced the Briscoe Brothers, where the match ended in a no contest. This was Lee's last appearance in ROH until 2022.

=== Evolve (2017–2018) ===
Lee signed with Evolve in January 2017, and made his debut at Evolve 76, losing to Chris Hero. He made his return on February 24 at Evolve 78, defeating Zack Sabre Jr. The following night, at Evolve 79, he defeated Tracy Williams. Lee received his first championship opportunity at Evolve 87 on June 25, when he unsuccessfully challenged Matt Riddle for the WWN Championship. On October 14, at Evolve 94, Lee defeated Riddle to win the WWN Championship. On April 6, 2018, at Evolve 103, he lost the title to Austin Theory.

=== Pro Wrestling Guerrilla (2017–2018) ===
Lee made his Pro Wrestling Guerrilla (PWG) debut on March 18, 2017, at the Nice Boys (Don't Play Rock N' Roll) event, competing in a triple threat match against Brian Cage and Sami Callihan, won by Cage. At the Game Over, Man event, he lost to Jeff Cobb. On May 19 at Head Like A Cole, he won his first match in PWG, defeating Trevor Lee. He followed this up by defeating Lio Rush and Trent at Pushin Forward Back on July 7. In September, Lee made it to the finals of the 2017 Battle of Los Angeles, where he was defeated by Ricochet. At Time Is a Flat Circle on March 23, 2018, Lee defeated Chuck Taylor to become the PWG World Champion. On April 21 at All Star Weekend 14, Lee lost the title to Walter in a three-way match, also involving Jonah Rock.

=== WWE (2018–2021) ===
==== NXT (2018–2020) ====
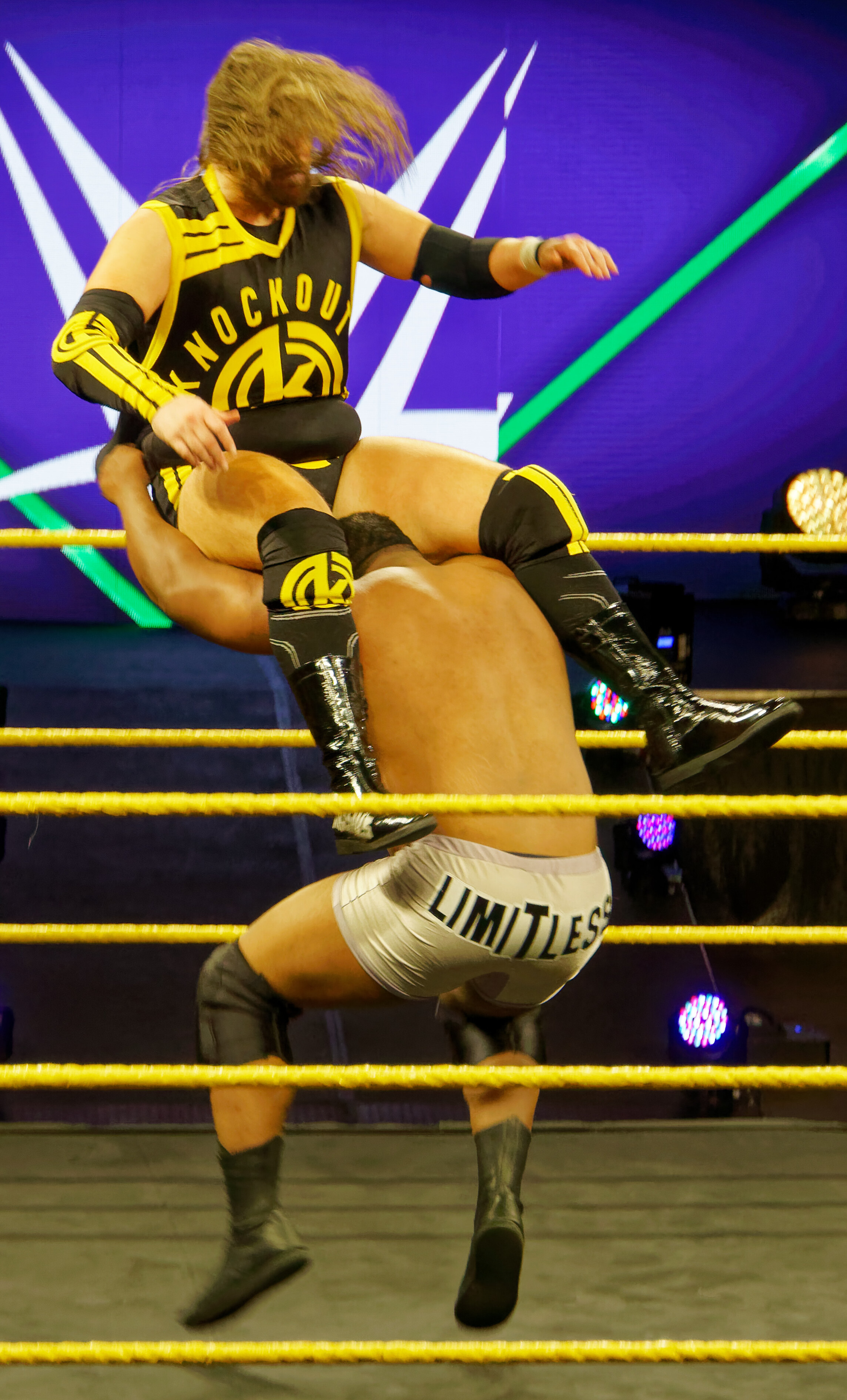
Lee powerbombing Kassius Ohno during his debut in April 2018

Prior to officially signing with WWE, Lee received a tryout in 2008, although this did not result in him being hired. He appeared as an extra on the March 30, 2009 episode of Raw, playing a security guard. On April 5, 2018, during WrestleMania Axxess weekend, Lee made an appearance for NXT, defeating Kassius Ohno. On May 1, it was announced that Lee had signed a contract with WWE. Lee appeared in attendance for NXT TakeOver: Chicago II on June 16. On the August 8 episode of NXT, Lee made his televised in-ring debut for WWE, defeating Marcel Barthel. Throughout the rest of 2018, Lee wrestled sporadically on NXT, defeating the likes of Luke Menzies, Kona Reeves, but losing to Lars Sullivan.

On March 7, 2019, Lee suffered an undisclosed injury. The injury resulted in an early end to his planned feud with Dominik Dijakovic, who he was supposed to face for the next two months. Lee returned to action on April 18, at a house show in Lakeland, Florida. On November 1, Lee was among the NXT wrestlers who invaded that night's episode of SmackDown. At NXT TakeOver: WarGames on November 23, Lee was included in Tommaso Ciampa's team as they defeated The Undisputed Era (Adam Cole, Bobby Fish, Kyle O'Reilly and Roderick Strong) in a WarGames match. The next night, he made up part of Team NXT at the Survivor Series pay-per-view, where they faced Team SmackDown and Team Raw in a 5-on-5-on-5 Survivor Series match, which Team SmackDown won, even though he was the last Competitor for Team NXT to get eliminated by SmackDown's Roman Reigns.

On the January 8, 2020 episode of NXT, Lee won a fatal-four way match over Cameron Grimes, Damian Priest, and Dominik Dijakovic to become the number one contender to the NXT North American Championship, and defeated Roderick Strong on the January 22 episode of NXT to win the championship. On January 26, Lee participated in the Royal Rumble match at the Royal Rumble pay-per-view, but was eliminated by the WWE Champion Brock Lesnar. Lee then successfully defended his title against Dominik Dijakovic at NXT TakeOver: Portland and Johnny Gargano at TakeOver: In Your House. During the second night of The Great American Bash on July 8, Lee defeated Adam Cole to win the NXT Championship, becoming a double champion, and the first person to hold the NXT and North American Championships simultaneously. On the July 22 episode of NXT, Lee voluntarily relinquished the North American Championship, and started a feud with Karrion Kross over the NXT Championship. At NXT TakeOver XXX on August 22, Lee lost the NXT Championship to Kross in what would be his final match in NXT.

==== Raw (2020–2021) ====
At SummerSlam, it was announced by WWE that Lee would be moving to the Raw brand and make his debut the following day's episode of Raw. Lee made his main roster debut on the August 24 episode of Raw, where he faced Randy Orton and lost via disqualification thanks to interference from WWE Champion Drew McIntyre. A rematch between Lee and Orton was made for the Payback pay-per-view, in which Lee won. At Survivor Series on November 22, Lee made up part of Team Raw as he teamed with Braun Strowman, AJ Styles, Riddle and Sheamus to defeat Team Smackdown (Jey Uso, Kevin Owens, Seth Rollins, King Corbin and Otis) in a clean sweep.

Lee would enter contention for the WWE Championship, participating in a triple threat match, where the winner would receive a WWE Championship match at TLC, but lost to Styles. On the January 4, 2021 episode of Raw, Lee unsuccessfully faced Drew McIntyre for the WWE Championship. The following month, Lee was scheduled to face Riddle and Bobby Lashley for the United States Championship at the Elimination Chamber event, but was pulled from the event due to an injury.

Lee was absent for five months due to a COVID-19 diagnosis, followed by heart inflammation. He returned on the July 19 episode of Raw, accepting WWE Champion Bobby Lashley's open challenge match but was defeated. During the following months, Lee began to work as Keith "Bearcat" Lee or Bearcat Lee (a homage to Bearcat Wright) as part of a gimmick change, but on November 4, Lee was released from his WWE contract.

=== All Elite Wrestling / Return to ROH (2022–present) ===
==== Swerve In Our Glory (2022–2023) ====
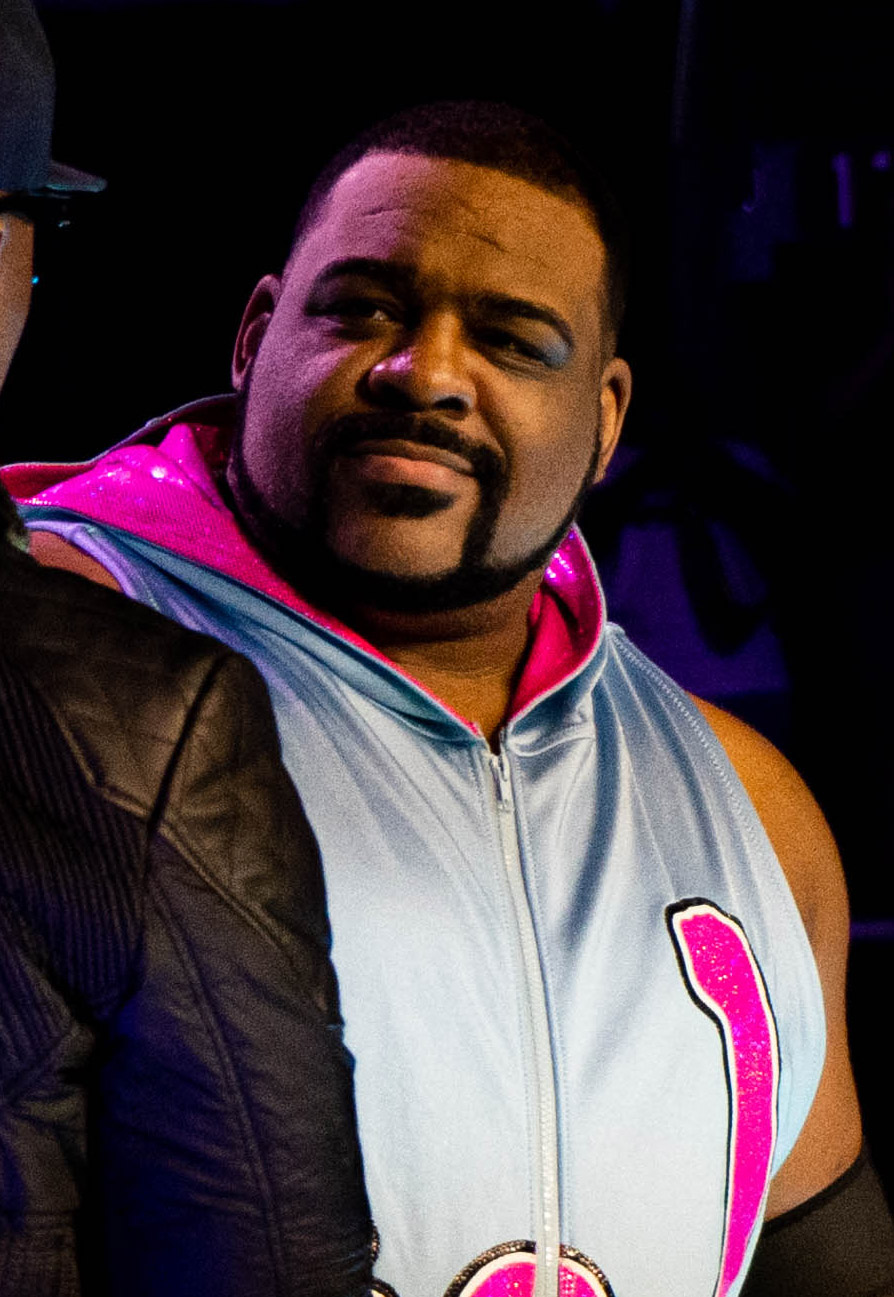
Lee in June 2022

Lee made a surprise debut with All Elite Wrestling (AEW) On the February 9, 2022 episode of Dynamite, defeating Isiah Kassidy to qualify for the "Face of the Revolution" ladder match at Revolution. The match was won by Wardlow.

In late-February 2022, Lee formed an alliance with Swerve Strickland, when Strickland came to Lee's aid after he was attacked by Team Taz. The two began teaming as "Swerve in Our Glory". At Fyter Fest in July 2023, Swerve In Our Glory defeated defending champions the Young Bucks and Team Taz in a Triple or Nothing tag team match to win the AEW World Tag Team Championship. They successfully defended the titles against challengers including the Lucha Brothers and Private Party. They subsequently entered a three match series with The Acclaimed, defeating them at All Out, losing the belts to them in a rematch on the September 20 episode of Dynamite, and losing to them once more at Full Gear in November 2022 after Strickland slapped Lee when Lee refused to use a pair of pliers as a weapon, causing Lee to walk out on the match. In December 2022, Lee made his return to Ring of Honor (ROH), now under the ownership of Tony Khan, for the first time in five years. At Final Battle, Swerve In Our Glory faced Shane Taylor Promotions (Shane Taylor and JD Griffey). Towards the end of the match, Lee accidentally caught Swerve Strickland, which led to Strickland walking out on him, but Lee took advantage of a miscue between Taylor and Griffey, and powerbombed Griffey to win the match. On the December 21 episode of Dynamite, Strickland formed a new stable, Mogul Affiliates, with Parker Boudreaux, Granden Goetzman, and Rick Ross. Mogul Affiliates attacked Lee, ending Swerve In Our Glory.

==== Championship pursuits and hiatus (2023–present) ====
On the February 17, 2023 episode of Rampage, Lee saved Dustin Rhodes from a post-match attack by Strickland and Boudreaux. He then began an alliance with Rhodes, dubbing themselves "Naturally Limitless". In their first match as a tag team, they defeated Mogul Affiliates on the March 3 episode of Rampage, and they continued to team together throughout the year. At Double or Nothing in May 2023, Lee participated in a 21-man blackjack battle royal for the AEW International Championship, where he eliminated the Blade, before attacking Strickland, which led to Brian Cage eliminating him. In June 2023, Lee teamed with Darby Allin and Orange Cassidy and their allies, partnering them in victories over Mogul Embassy and the Jericho Appreciation Society. Lee and Strickland were chosen in a blind eliminator tag team tournament, where on the July 5 episode of Dynamite, they were defeated by Allin and Cassidy.

On the November 8, 2023 episode of Dynamite, Lee unsuccessfully challenged Samoa Joe for the ROH World Television Championship, which was ended by referee's decision. At Final Battle in December 2023, Lee defeated his former tag team partner Shane Taylor in a singles match. Lee was scheduled to face Strickland in a match at Worlds End later that month, but he was withdrawn from the match due to an undisclosed injury. In January 2024, Lee reportedly underwent "double surgeries" and has been on hiatus since.

== Other media ==
Lee made his video game debut as a playable character in WWE 2K20 and appears in WWE 2K22. Also, he appears in AEW Fight Forever as DLC.

== Personal life ==
Lee married fellow professional wrestler Mia Yim in February 2022. They divorced in 2025.

In 2020, during the Speaking Out movement, Lee alleged that a woman had spiked his drink and sexually assaulted him in 2016.

== Filmography ==
Year	Title	Role	Notes
2020	The Main Event	Smooth Operator	

== Championships and accomplishments ==
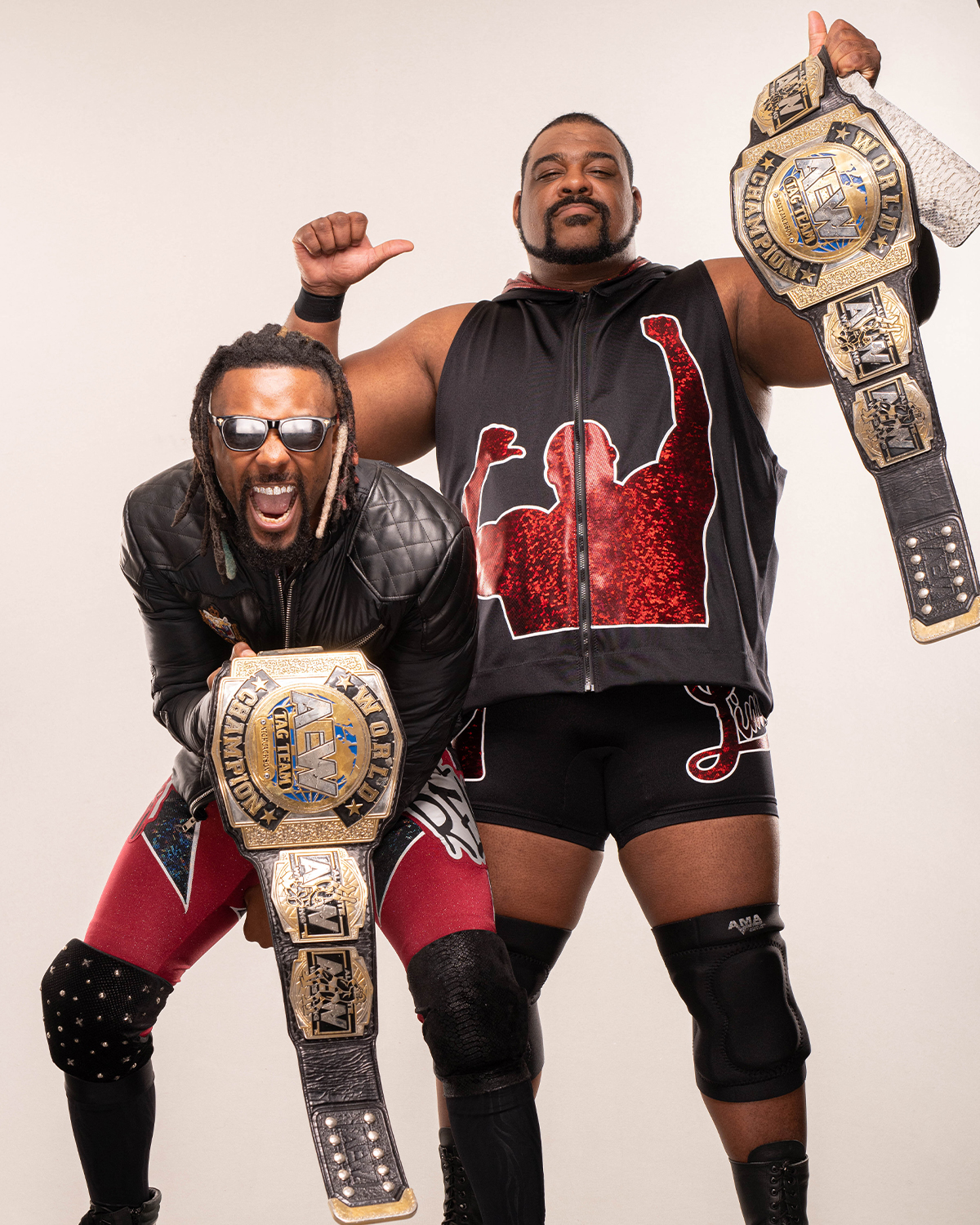
Lee (right) and Swerve Strickland as AEW World Tag Team Champions in 2022

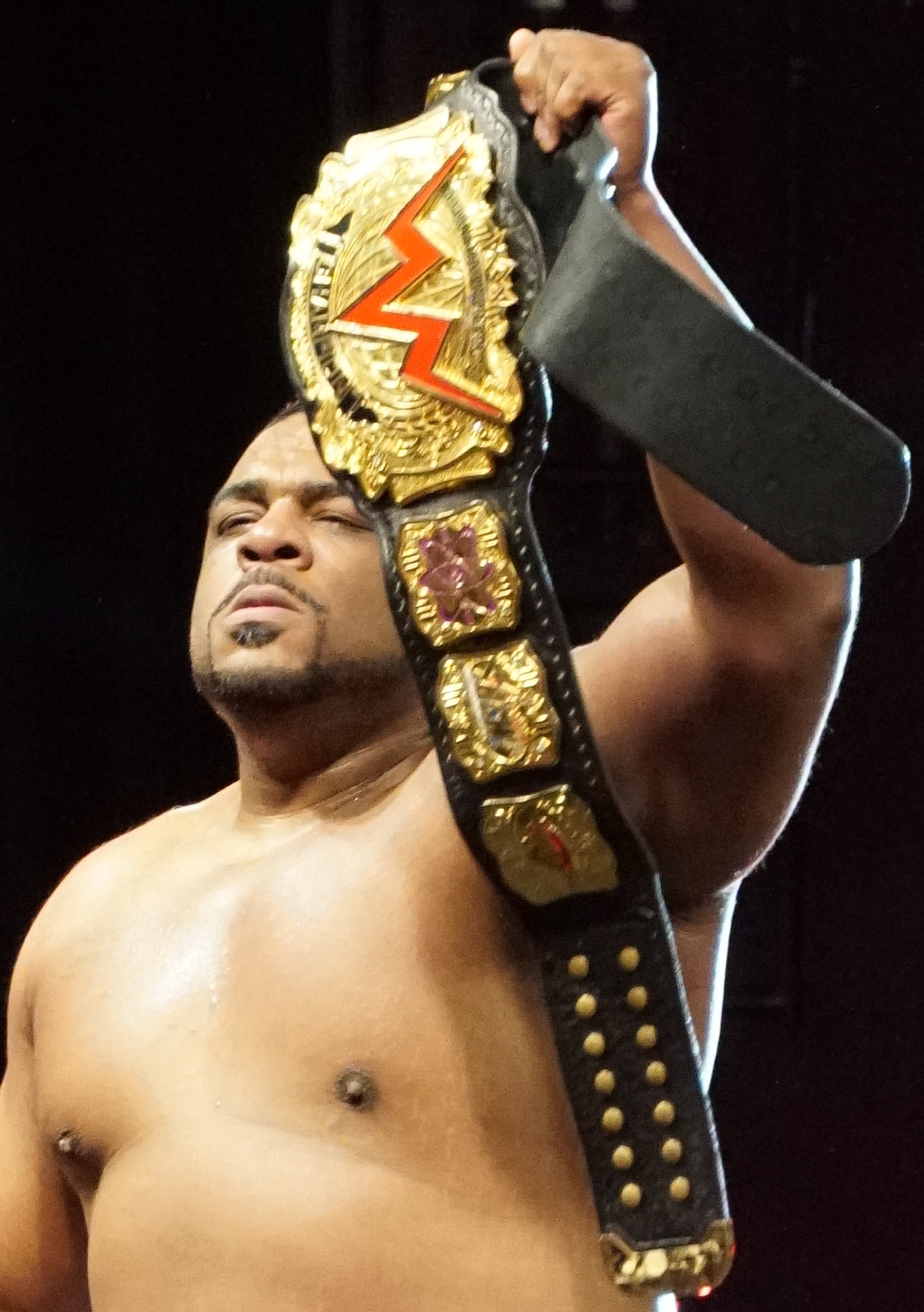
Lee as WWN Champion in 2018

- All Elite Wrestling
  - AEW World Tag Team Championship (1 time) – with Swerve Strickland
- Inspire Pro Wrestling
  - Inspire Pro Pure Prestige Championship (1 time)
- North American Wrestling Allegiance
  - NAWA Tag Team Championship (1 time) – with Li Fang
- Pro Wrestling Guerrilla
  - PWG World Championship (1 time)
- Pro Wrestling Illustrated
  - Ranked No. 11 of the top 500 singles wrestlers in the PWI 500 in 2020
- Sports Illustrated
  - Ranked No. 10 of the top 10 wrestlers 2017
- VIP Wrestling
  - VIP Heavyweight Championship (1 time)
  - VIP Tag Team Championship (1 time) – with Shane Taylor
- WWE
  - NXT Championship (1 time)
  - NXT North American Championship (1 time)
  - NXT Year-End Award for Breakout Star of the Year (2019)
- WWNLive
  - WWN Championship (1 time)
- Xtreme Championship Wrestling
  - XCW Heavyweight Championship (1 time)
  - XCW TNT Championship (1 time)
