= Evolve 1: Richards vs. Ibushi =

Professional wrestling show

- Promotion: Evolve Wrestling
- Date: January 16, 2010
- City: Rahway, New Jersey
- Venue: Rahway Rec Center
- Attendance: ca. 500

Evolve 1: Richards vs. Ibushi, was a professional wrestling show produced by Evolve Wrestling and was held on held in Rahway, New Jersey at the Rahway Rec Center. This was the inaugural event produced by Evolve Wrestling. Lenny Leonard and Leonard F. Chikarason served as the commentators. In the main event, Davey Richards, accompanied by Kyle O'Reilly and Tony Kozina, faced against Kota Ibushi, who was accompanied by Michael Nakazawa.

== Background ==
In 2009, in a series of viral videos featuring Jimmy Jacobs, Gabe Sapolsky announced Evolve. After this, more videos were produced promoting more wrestlers who were to be feature in the inaugural show, as well as featuring blogs written by other wrestlers expressing their thoughts about the promotion.

During interviews with the Wrestling Observer's Figure 4 Weekly on its radio show, Sapolsky told editor Bryan Alvarez that Evolve would have stronger emphasis on rules and would not limit anyone based on their own respective style of wrestling in favor of showcasing the talent's individual strengths and covering up their flaws.

== Storylines ==
The show included matches resulting from various scripted storylines from Evolve and their sister promotion Dragon Gate USA.

On November 30, 2009, the main event for Evolve's debut show was announced which would feature Davey Richards taking on Kota Ibushi.

On January 29, 2010, Sapolsky announced that Evolve would no longer be booking Davey Richards as he had signed a new deal with his former employer Ring of Honor. He was also dropped from Dragon Gate USA shows including their WrestleMania weekend shows.

== Results ==
No.	Results	Stipulations	Times
1	Kyle O'Reilly (with Tony Kozina) defeated Bobby Fish	Singles match	6:33
2	Chuck Taylor defeated Cheech	Official singles division qualifying match	6:28
3	Ricochet defeated Arik Cannon	Singles match	4:00
4	The Dark City Fight Club (Jon Davis and Kory Chavis) defeated Aeroform (Flip Kendrick and Louis Lyndon)	Tag team match	6:26
5	Mercedes Martinez defeated Niya	Singles match	1:11
6	Brad Allen defeated Silas Young	Singles match	10:22
7	Jimmy Jacobs defeated Ken Doane	Singles match	10:06
8	Johnny Gargano defeated Chris Dickinson	Singles match	6:05
9	Munenori Sawa defeated TJP	Singles match	9:37
10	Team Frightening (Frightmare, Hallowicked and Mike Quackenbush) defeated Akuma's Army (Brodie Lee, Gran Akuma and Icarus)	Six-man tag team match	11:34
11	Davey Richards (with Kyle O'Reilly and Tony Kozina) defeated Kota Ibushi (with Michael Nakazawa) by submission	Singles match	18:12
