= Open the Freedom Gate Championship =

Professional wrestling championship

Details
- Promotion: Dragon Gate USA; Dragon Gate; Evolve
- Date established: November 28, 2009
- Date retired: August 15, 2015
Statistics
- First champion: BxB Hulk
- Final champion: Timothy Thatcher
- Most reigns: Johnny Gargano (2 reigns)
- Longest reign: Johnny Gargano (873 days)
- Shortest reign: Timothy Thatcher (36 days)
- Oldest champion: Timothy Thatcher (32 years, 115 days)
- Youngest champion: Johnny Gargano (24 years, 91 days days)
- Heaviest champion: Drew Galloway (254 lb (115 kg))
- Lightest champion: BxB Hulk (168 lb (76 kg))

The Open the Freedom Gate Championship was the major title in the promotion Dragon Gate USA. The first holder of the title was crowned following a 14-man tournament held at DGUSA Freedom Fight on November 28, 2009. The title was recognized by Dragon Gate USA's parent promotion, Dragon Gate, and it has been defended at a Dragon Gate show in Japan. The title was also recognized by the Evolve promotion.

There were seven reigns by six wrestlers. BxB Hulk became the first champion by winning a 14-man tournament. Timothy Thatcher was the final champion, vacating the title on August 15, 2015.

The championship was defended in the US, Japan, China, England, Germany, Canada, Scotland and Northern Ireland for promotions such as Revolution Pro Wrestling, British Championship Wrestling, Outback Championship Wrestling, Dragon Gate, Fight Club: PRO, Southside Wrestling Entertainment, Alpha-1 Wrestling, WWNLive, Kamikaze Pro, Premier British Wrestling and Pro Wrestling Ulster.

== Title history ==
Key
No.	Overall reign number
Reign	Reign number for the specific champion
Days	Number of days held
Defenses	Number of successful defenses

No.	Champion	Championship change			Reign statistics			Notes	Ref.
No.	Champion	Date	Event	Location	Reign	Days	Defenses	Notes	Ref.
Dragon Gate USA (DG-USA)
1	BxB Hulk	November 28, 2009	Freedom Fight 2009	Philadelphia, Pennsylvania	1	426	7	Defeated CIMA, Gran Akuma and YAMATO in a four-way elimination tournament final match.	
2	Yamato	January 28, 2011	United: NYC	New York City	1	289	6		
3	Johnny Gargano	November 13, 2011	Freedom Fight 2011	New York City	1	873	22		
4	Ricochet	April 4, 2014	Open the Ultimate Gate 2014	New Orleans, Louisiana	1	226	5		
5	Johnny Gargano	November 16, 2014	WWNLive in China	Beijing, China	2	132	3		
6	Drew Galloway	March 28, 2015	Mercury Rising 2015	San Jose, California	1	104	5	This match was also contested for Galloway's Evolve Championship.	
7	Timothy Thatcher	July 10, 2015	Evolve 45	Tampa, Florida	1	36	0	This match was also contested for the Evolve Championship.	
—	Deactivated	August 15, 2015	Evolve 47	Queens, New York	—	—	—	Thatcher handed the title to Johnny Gargano, rendering it vacant and inactive.	

== Combined reigns ==
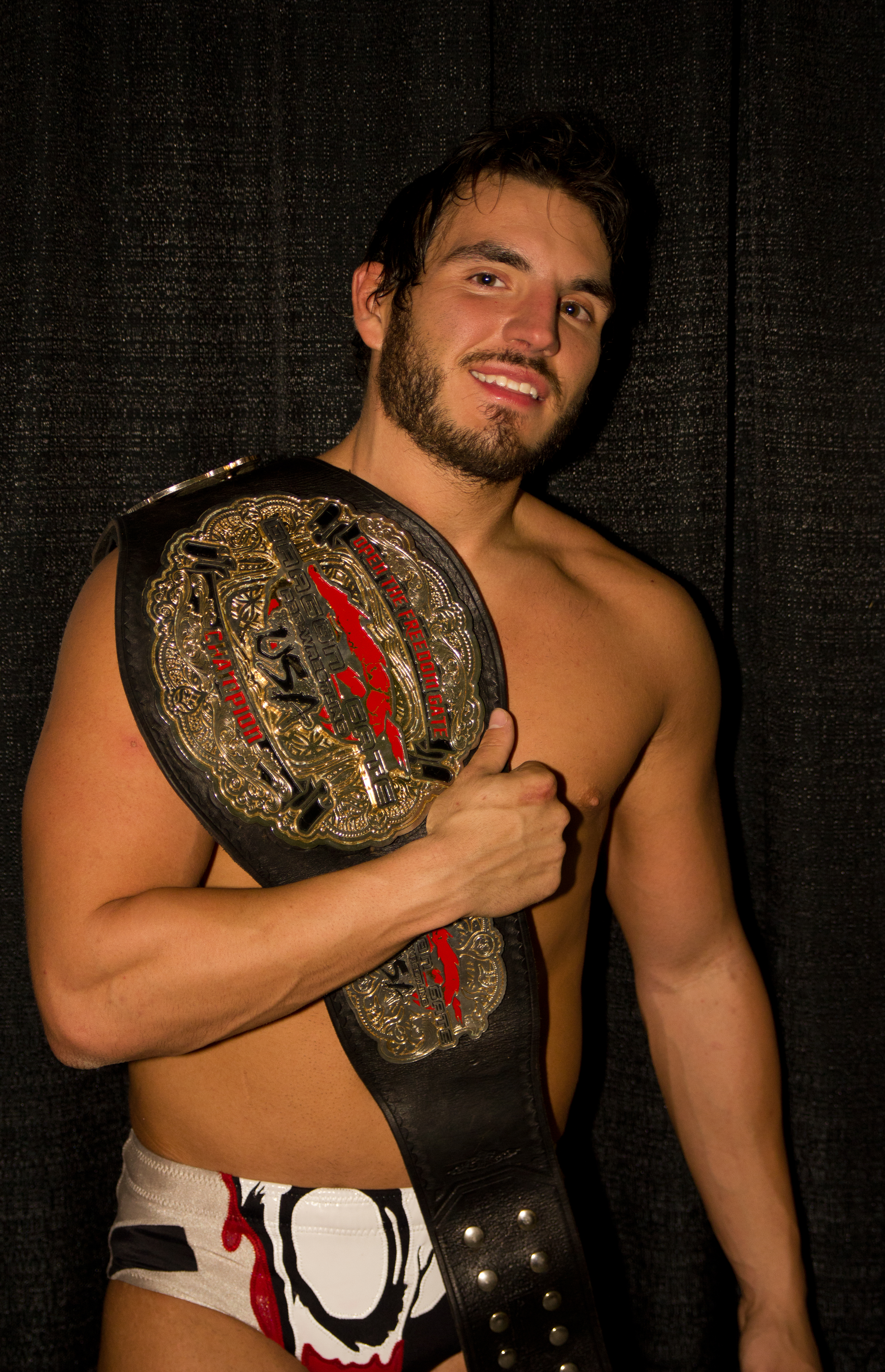
Only two-time champion Johnny Gargano holding the belt

Rank	Champion	No. of reigns	Combined defenses	Combined days
1	Johnny Gargano	2	25	1,005
2	BxB Hulk	1	7	426
3	Yamato	1	6	289
4	Ricochet	1	5	226
5	Drew Galloway	1	5	104
6	Timothy Thatcher	1	0	36

== See also ==
- Open the Dream Gate Championship
