= WWN Championship =

Professional wrestling championship

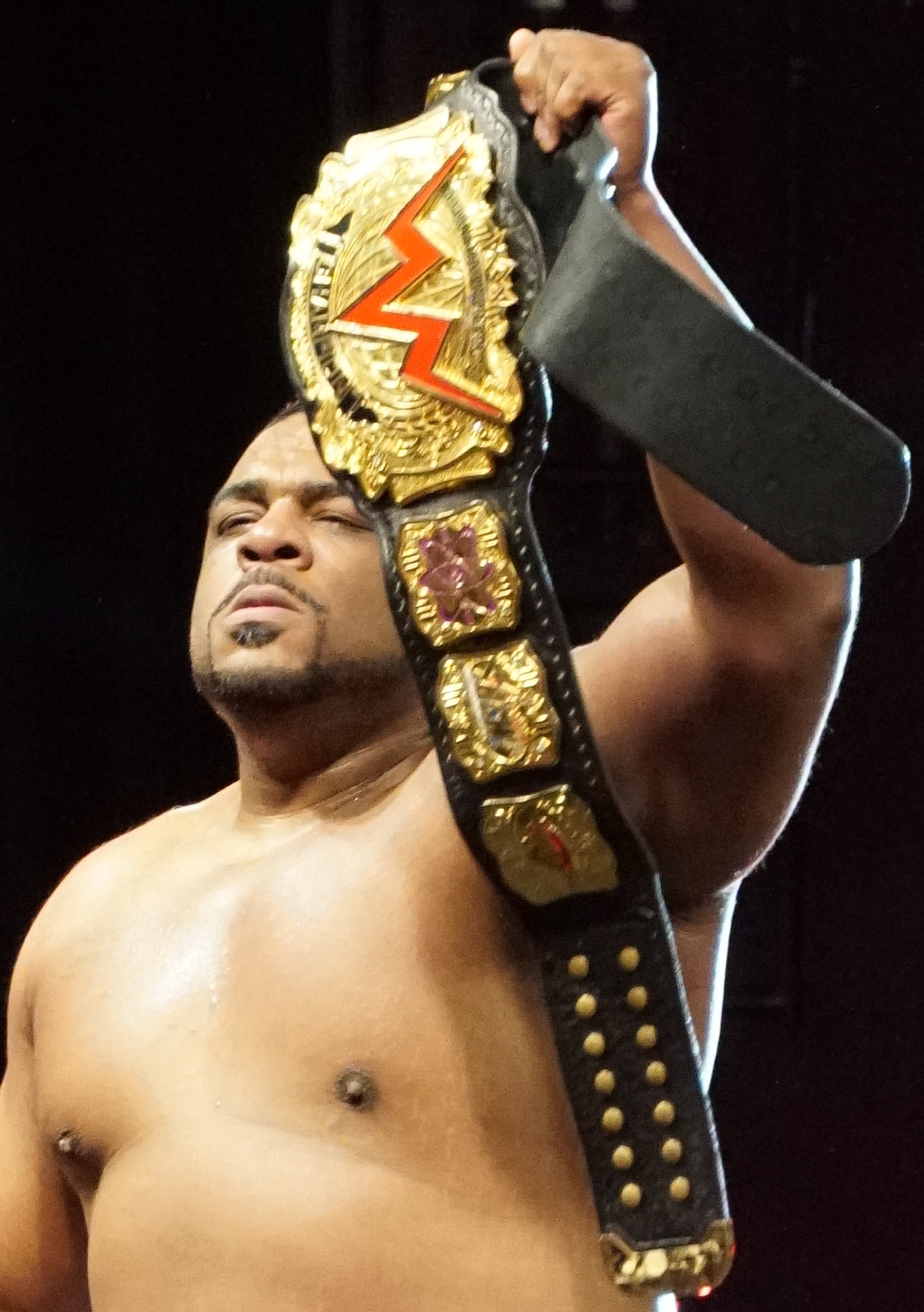
- Keith Lee, Shown here with the WWN Championship

Details
- Promotion: WWNLive
- Date established: November 23, 2016
- Date retired: November 9, 2019
Statistics
- First champion: Matt Riddle
- Final champion: Austin Theory
- Most reigns: Austin Theory (2 reigns)
- Longest reign: JD Drake (258 days)
- Shortest reign: Austin Theory (1st reign, 78 days)
- Oldest champion: JD Drake (34 years, 275 days)
- Youngest champion: Austin Theory (20 years, 247 days)
- Heaviest champion: Keith Lee (320 lb (150 kg))
- Lightest champion: Joey Janela (183 lb (83 kg))

The WWN Championship was a professional wrestling championship promoted by the WWNLive governing body. The inaugural champion was crowned on April 1, 2017, when Matt Riddle defeated five other men for the title.

Like most professional wrestling championships, the title was won as a result of a scripted match. There have been six reigns shared among five wrestlers.

== History ==
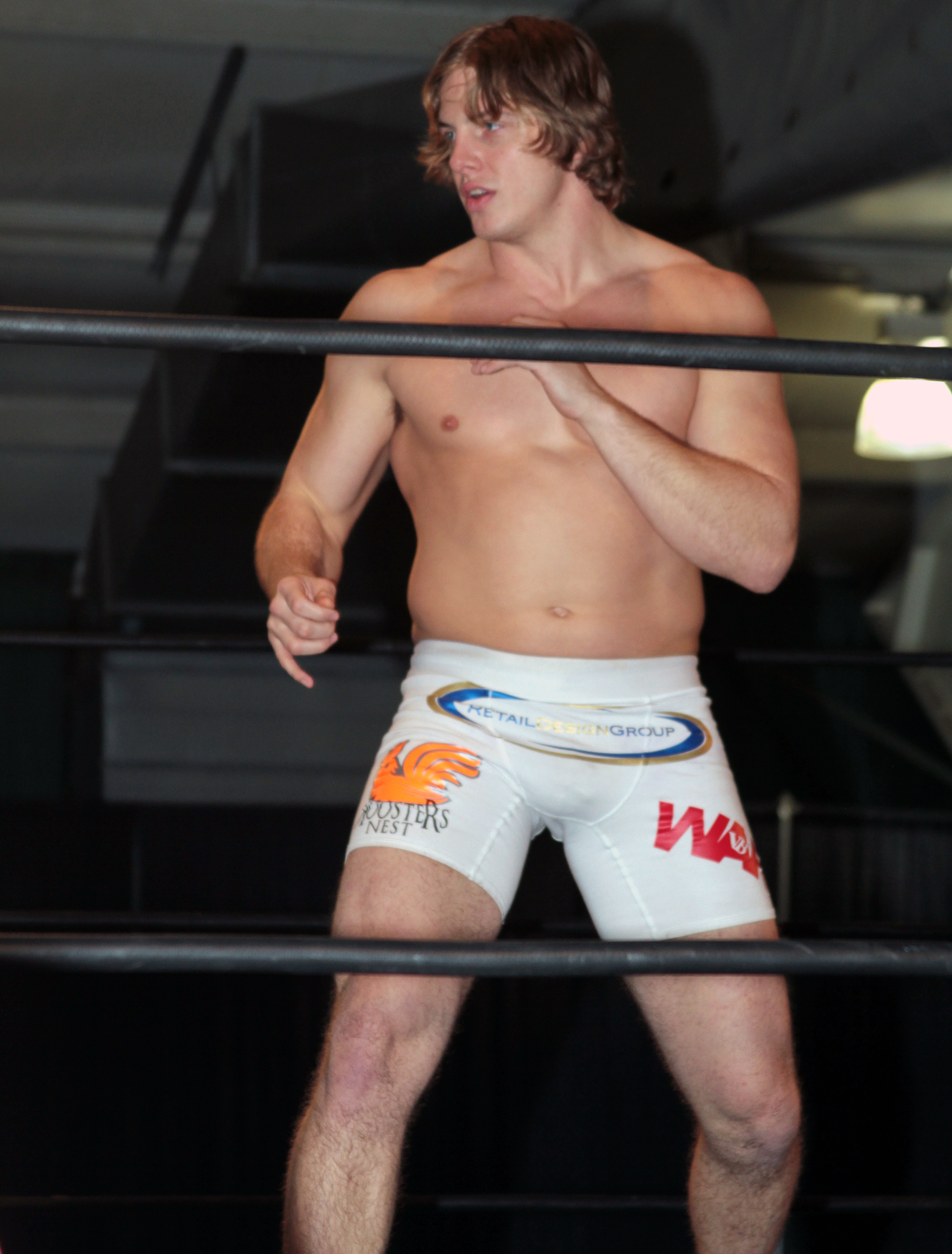
Matt Riddle, the inaugural WWN Champion

On November 23, 2016, WWNLive, the governing body overseeing promotions such as Evolve and Full Impact Pro (FIP), announced the creation of the WWN Championship. The champion would defend the title across all promotions under the WWNLive umbrella. Each promotion was asked to send their representative for an elimination match on April 1, 2017, at Mercury Rising 2017 to determine the inaugural champion. Former Evolve Champion and Evolve Tag Team Champion Drew Galloway was the first entrant into the match on February 22. Over the following weeks, Fred Yehi, Jon Davis, Matt Riddle, Parrow and Tracy Williams were added to the match. At Mercury Rising 2017, Timothy Thatcher was added to the match, while Galloway was pulled out, after suffering a storyline injury at the hands of Keith Lee. It was later revealed that this had been done due to Galloway having re-signed with WWE. Riddle went on to win the six-way elimination match to become the inaugural WWN Champion.

It was later retired at Evolve’s 10th Anniversary Show when it was defended by JD Drake against then Evolve Champion Austin Theory in a Title for Title Match

== Title history ==
Key
No.	Overall reign number
Reign	Reign number for the specific champion
Days	Number of days held
Defenses	Number of successful defenses

No.	Champion	Championship change			Reign statistics			Notes	Ref.
No.	Champion	Date	Event	Location	Reign	Days	Defenses	Notes	Ref.
1	Matt Riddle	April 1, 2017	Mercury Rising	Fern Park, FL	1	196	9	Defeated Fred Yehi, Jon Davis, Parrow, Timothy Thatcher and Tracy Williams in a six-way elimination match to become the inaugural champion.	
2	Keith Lee	October 14, 2017	Evolve 94	Queens, NY	1	174	4	This was a Last Man Standing match	
3	Austin Theory	April 6, 2018	Evolve 103	Kenner, Louisiana	1	78	1	This was a winner takes all match, in which Theory defended the FIP World Heavyweight Championship.	
4	Joey Janela	June 23, 2018	Evolve 106	Brooklyn, NY	1	101	2		
—	Vacated	October 2, 2018	—	—	—	—	—	WWN stripped Janela of the title after a knee injury	
5	JD Drake	October 28, 2018	Evolve 114	Ybor City, FL	1	258	11	This was a six-way ladder match for the vacant title, also involving Anthony Henry, Austin Theory, Darby Allin, Harlem Bravado.	
6	Austin Theory	July 13, 2019	Evolve 131	Philadelphia, PA	2	119	0	This was also for Theory's Evolve Championship.	
—	Deactivated	November 9, 2019	—	—	—	—	—	The title was then retired without an official announcement.	

== Combined reigns ==
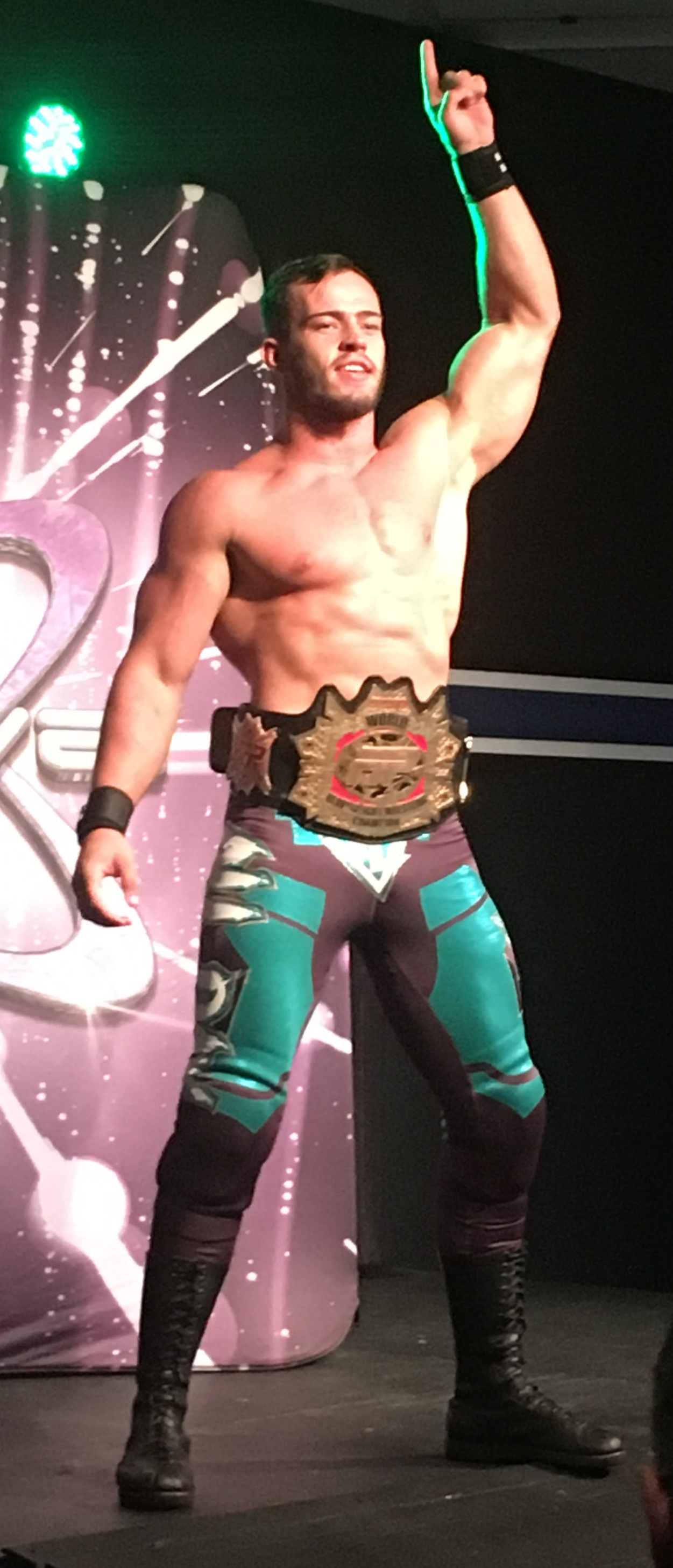
Record two-time and final champion Austin Theory

Rank	Wrestler	No. of reigns	Combined defenses	Combined days
1	JD Drake	1	11	258
2	Austin Theory	2	1	197
3	Matt Riddle	1	9	196
4	Keith Lee	1	4	174
5	Joey Janela	1	2	101

== See also ==
- Evolve Championship
