= Evolve Championship =

Former professional wrestling championship

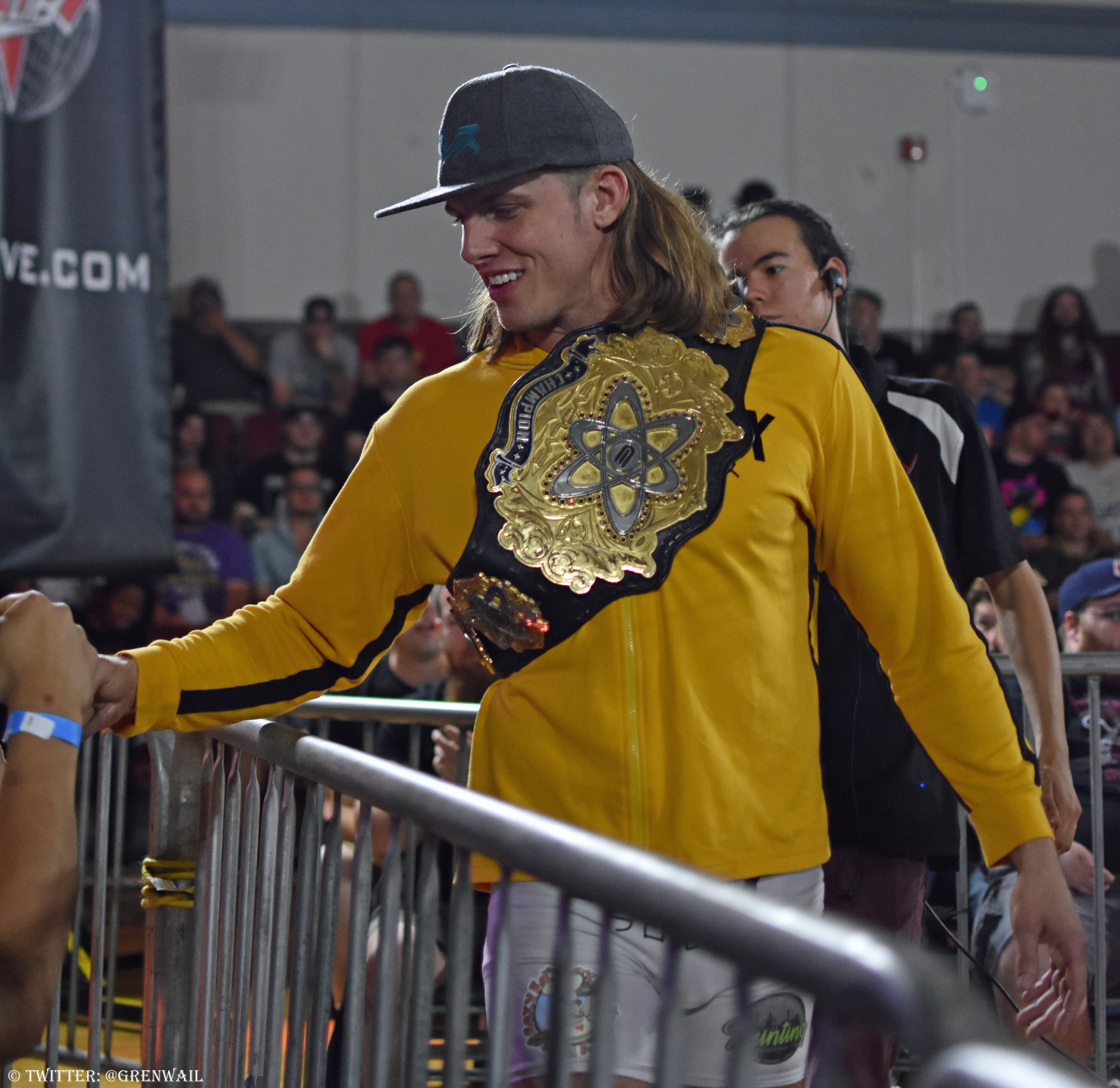
- Matt Riddle with the Evolve Championship.

Details
- Promotion: Evolve
- Date established: September 8, 2012
- Date retired: July 2, 2020

Other names
- Evolve Championship (2012–2020); Evolve World Championship (2015)
Statistics
- First champion: A. R. Fox
- Final champion: Josh Briggs
- Longest reign: Timothy Thatcher (596 days)
- Shortest reign: Fabian Aichner (48 days)
- Oldest champion: Chris Hero (34 years, 61 days)
- Youngest champion: Austin Theory (21 years)
- Heaviest champion: Chris Hero (270 lb (120 kg))
- Lightest champion: A. R. Fox (185 lb (84 kg))

The Evolve Championship was a men's professional wrestling championship that was created and promoted by the American promotion Evolve. The inaugural champion was A. R. Fox and the final champion was Josh Briggs. There were 10 reigns among 10 different wrestlers. The championship was deactivated on July 2, 2020, after WWE acquired the promotion.

In May 2025, two months after the relaunch of Evolve as a WWE brand division, a new WWE Evolve Men's Championship was created, but it does not retain the lineage of the original Evolve Championship.

== History ==
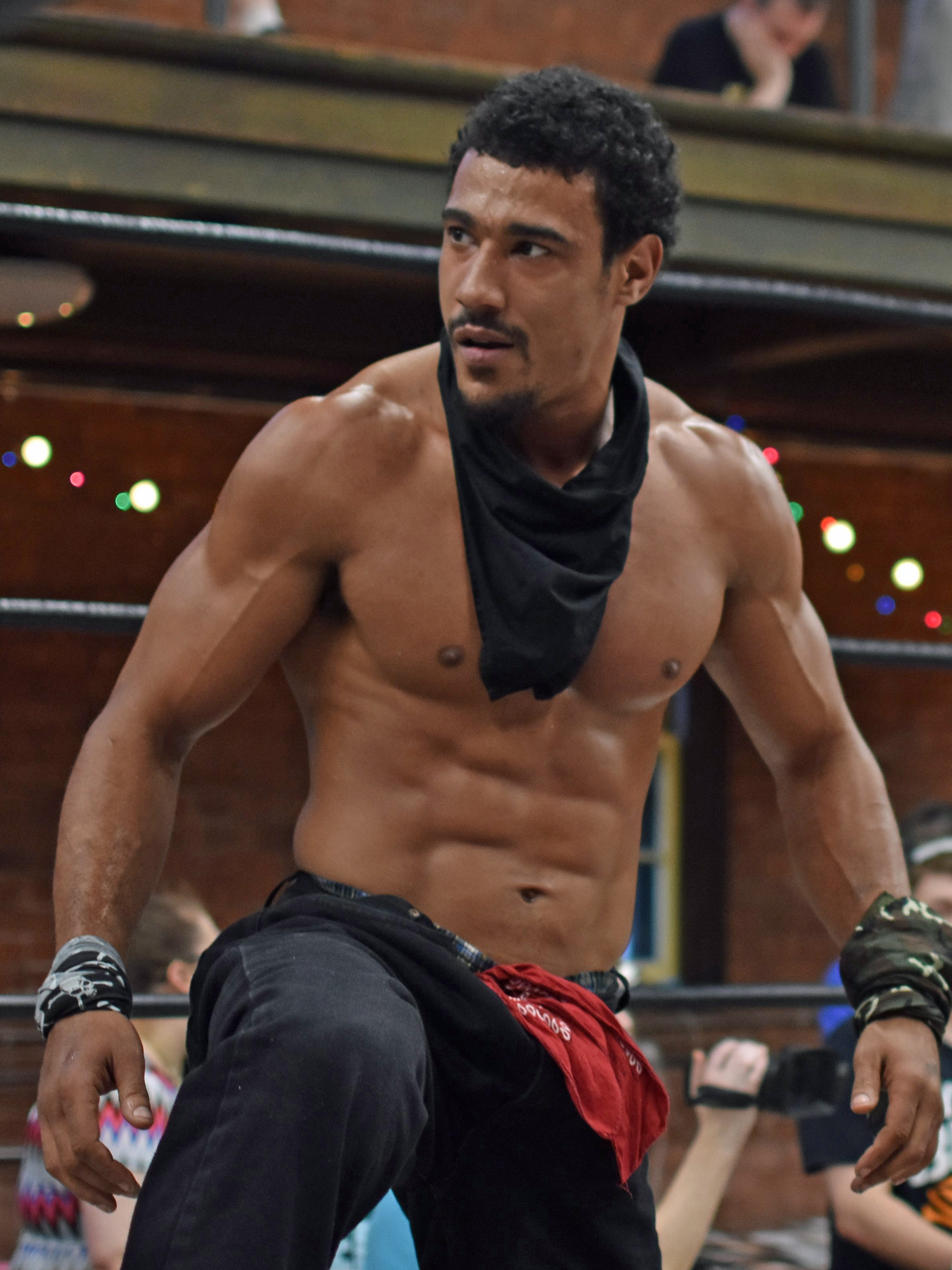
Inaugural champion A. R. Fox.

=== Origin ===
Evolve was founded in 2009 by Dragon Gate USA booker Gabe Sapolsky, Full Impact Pro (FIP) owner Sal Hamaoui and independent wrestler Davey Richards and held its first event on January 16, 2010. Originally, Evolve had no championships, instead putting emphasis on each wrestler's win–loss record. On November 25, 2011, Evolve and Dragon Gate USA announced the unification of the two promotions, which would result in Evolve recognizing the Open the Freedom Gate and Open the United Gate Championships as its top two titles. However, on September 8, 2012, Evolve announced that the promotion would be introducing its first own title, the Evolve Championship. A. R. Fox defeated Sami Callihan in the finals of an eight-man tournament on April 5, 2013, to become the inaugural champion.

The title was defended outside of the United States for the first time on August 29, 2014, when champion Drew Galloway retained against Johnny Moss at an event in Kilmarnock, Scotland and then again the following day when Galloway defeated Andy Wild in a Battle of the Nations match in Aberdeen, Scotland. Following multiple successful international championship defenses by Galloway, he dubbed the title the Evolve World Championship on January 9, 2015, at Evolve 36. However, with some exceptions, the promotion mainly continued referring to the title as simply the Evolve Championship. During Galloway's record-breaking reign, the title was defended internationally in Scotland, England, Northern Ireland and Australia for promotions such as Revolution Pro Wrestling, British Championship Wrestling, WrestleZone, Rock N Wrestle, Future Pro Wrestling, Outback Championship Wrestling, Premier British Wrestling and Pro Wrestling Ulster. During the subsequent Timothy Thatcher title reign, the title was also defended three times in Germany for Westside Xtreme Wrestling. The title was also defended outside of EVOLVE for US independent promotions, including Premiere Wrestling Xperience, Big Time Wrestling, Atlanta Wrestling Entertainment, MAGNUM Pro Wrestling, WWNLive, Pro Wrestling Force and DGUSA and on an EVOLVE/WWN crossover event with Progress Wrestling.

The Evolve Championship was deactivated on July 2, 2020, after WWE acquired Evolve and ceased operations.

=== WWE revival ===
In January 2025, it was reported that WWE were planning to revive Evolve as a brand. At Royal Rumble on February 1, WWE announced that Evolve would premiere on Tubi on March 5 in the United States and on YouTube internationally. On the May 7 episode of Evolve, Evolve Prime Minister Stevie Turner announced the creation of the WWE Evolve Championship and the WWE Evolve Women's Championship; the men's title does not retain the lineage of the original championship.

== Tournaments ==
=== Inaugural tournament ===
On February 8, 2013, Evolve announced that the inaugural Evolve Champion would be determined in a single-elimination tournament on April 5, 2013. Based on their win–loss records, number one seed Chuck Taylor and number two seed Ricochet earned automatic spots in the semifinals of the tournament, while number three and four seeds A. R. Fox and Jon Davis earned spots in the first round of the tournament. The second first round match was a four-way match made up of Rich Swann, Samuray del Sol, Sami Callihan and Jigsaw, seeds five to eight, respectively. The entire tournament took place during the Evolve 19 internet pay-per-view (iPPV) in Secaucus, New Jersey. In their first round matches, A. R. Fox advanced with a disqualification win over Jon Davis, while Sami Callihan submitted Samuray del Sol to win the four-way match. In the semifinals, both the number one and number two seeds were eliminated, when Callihan submitted Chuck Taylor and Fox pinned Ricochet. In the end, Fox pinned Callihan in the finals to win the tournament and become the inaugural Evolve Champion.

First round
5; 6; 8	Rich Swann; Samuray del Sol; Jigsaw	Sub
7	Sami Callihan
3	A. R. Fox	DQ
4	Jon Davis

Semifinals
1	Chuck Taylor	Sub
7	Sami Callihan	8:37
2	Ricochet	Pin
3	A. R. Fox	12:54

Finals
7	Sami Callihan	Pin
3	A. R. Fox	19:11

== Title history ==
=== Names ===
Name	Years
Evolve Championship	April 2013 – July 2020
Evolve World Championship	January 2015 (sporadically)

=== Reigns ===
Key
No.	Overall reign number
Reign	Reign number for the specific champion
Days	Number of days held
Defenses	Number of successful defenses

No.	Champion	Championship change			Reign statistics			Notes	Ref.
No.	Champion	Date	Event	Location	Reign	Days	Defenses	Notes	Ref.
Evolve
1	A. R. Fox	April 5, 2013	Evolve 19	Secaucus, NJ	1	324	8	Fox defeated Sami Callihan in the finals of an eight-man tournament to become the inaugural champion.	
2	Chris Hero	February 23, 2014	Way of the Ronin 2014	Brooklyn, NY	1	166	2		
3	Drew Galloway	August 8, 2014	Evolve 31	Tampa, FL	1	336	20	Title sporadically referred to as the Evolve World Championship during this reign	
4	Timothy Thatcher	July 10, 2015	Evolve 45	Tampa, FL	1	596	22	This match was also contested for the Open the Freedom Gate Championship.	
5	Zack Sabre Jr.	February 25, 2017	Evolve 79	New York City, NY	1	404	13		
6	Matt Riddle	April 5, 2018	Evolve 102	Kenner, LA	1	121	5		
7	Shane Strickland	August 4, 2018	Evolve 108	Philadelphia, PA	1	85	2		
8	Fabian Aichner	October 28, 2018	Evolve 114	Ybor City, FL	1	48	1		
9	Austin Theory	December 15, 2018	Evolve 117	New York City, NY	1	329	12	This was a three-way match, also including Roderick Strong.	
10	Josh Briggs	November 9, 2019	Evolve 139	New York City, NY	1	236	3		
—	Deactivated	July 2, 2020	—	—	—	—	—	Deactivated when Evolve ceased operations.	
