= JD Drake =

American male professional wrestler (born 1984)

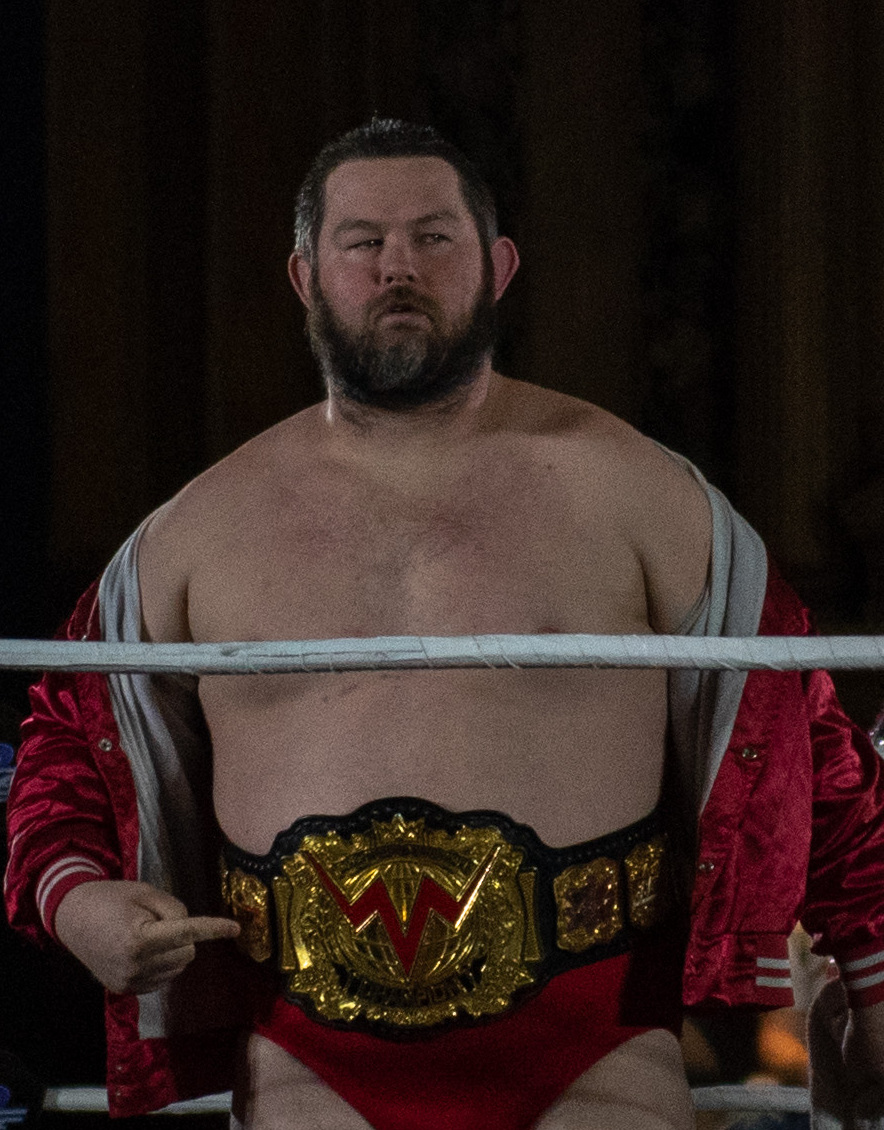
- Drake as the WWN Champion in March 2019

Personal information
- Born: 26 January 1984 (age 42) Shelby, North Carolina, United States

Professional wrestling career
- Ring name: James Drake James D. Drake JD Drake
- Billed height: 185 cm (6 ft 1 in)
- Billed weight: 126 kg (278 lb)
- Debut: 2013

David Drake, better known by his ring name JD Drake, is an American professional wrestler signed to Ring of Honor (ROH). He is also known for his tenures with World Wrestling Network (WWN), Full Impact Pro (FIP), All Elite Wrestling (AEW) and other promotions from the American independent scene. He is one-half of the tag team the WorkHorsemen with Anthony Henry.

== Professional wrestling career ==
=== American independent circuit (2013–present) ===
Drake made his professional wrestling debut at a house show promoted by Diamond Pro Wrestling on June 29, 2013, where he fell short to Dirty Dawg in singles competition. He is known for his tenures with various promotions from the American independent scene such as Premiere Wrestling Xperience (PWX), Limitless Wrestling and others.

Drake made a one-time appearance in an WWE NXT show on February 14, 2020, where he defeated Dion Maddin in singles competition. At GCW Into The Light, an event promoted by Game Changer Wrestling on April 21, 2023, he and Anthony Henry unsuccessfully challenged The East West Express (Jordan Oliver and Nick Wayne) for the GCW Tag Team Championship.

Drake briefly competed in several events from the European scene. In the 2019 edition of Westside Xtreme Wrestling (wXw)'s World Tag Team Festival, Drake teamed up with Anthony Henry to defeat The Anti-Fun Police (Chief Deputy Dunne and Los Federales Santos Jr.) in the first rounds, then fell short to Danny Burch and Oney Lorcan in the semifinals. He and Henry unsuccessfully challenged Aussie Open (Kyle Fletcher and Mark Davis) for the wXw World Tag Team Championship at wXw Amerika Ist Wunderbar Live From New York City on April 4, 2019. At Progress Chapter 103: Beer Snake City on February 23, 2020, he and Anthony Henry unsuccessfully faced Eddie Kingston and Scotty Davis in tag team competition.

=== World Wrestling Network/Evolve (2017–2021) ===
Drake competed in the Evolve/World Wrestling Network tandem for roughly four years, mainly in the tag division alongside Anthony Henry under the names of "The Lethal Enforcers". They won the Evolve Tag Team Championship at Evolve 88 on July 8, 2017, by defeating Catch Point (Chris Dickinson and Jaka). Drake competed in the last event of the promotion, the Evolve 146 from March 1, 2020, where he defeated Jake Atlas and Curt Stallion in a three-way match.

=== All Elite Wrestling (2021–present) ===
Drake was originally set to be signed by WWE alongside tag team partner Anthony Henry in early 2021, but according to the latter, Drake's signing was dropped due to not being medically fit to compete. Drake was instead scouted by All Elite Wrestling as he made his debut at AEW Dark #76 on February 23, 2021, where he fell short to Eddie Kingston in singles competition. At AEW Dynamite #79 on April 7, 2021, Drake unsuccessfully challenged Darby Allin for the AEW TNT Championship. He founded "The Wingmen" stable in April 2021 alongside Peter Avalon, Ryan Nemeth and Cezar Bononi. Christian Cage was reportedly behind the genesis of the idea of the stable, claiming that the concept of the unit was to make Nemeth, Bononi and Avalon help JD Drake to feel more appealing and act as his personal wingmen.

At AEW Collision #15 on September 23, 2023, Drake and Anthony Henry unsuccessfully challenged FTR (Dax Harwood and Cash Wheeler) for the AEW World Tag Team Championship. At Full Gear on November 22, 2025, he and Henry fell short to Eddie Kingston and Hook in tag team competition. At All Out on September 20, 2025, Drake and Henry fell short to The Opps (Samoa Joe and Powerhouse Hobbs).

==== Ring of Honor (2023–present) ====
Drake began competing as a regular for AEW's subsidiary Ring of Honor in 2023. At ROH on HonorClub #140 on November 6, 2025, Drake teamed up with BEEF and Anthony Henry to unsuccessfully challenge Shane Taylor Promotions (Carlie Bravo, Shane Taylor and Shawn Dean) for the ROH World Six-Man Tag Team Championship.

=== Deadlock Pro-Wrestling (2022–present) ===
Drake made his debut in Deadlock Pro-Wrestling alongside Anthony Henry at DPW Forever 2022 on April 16, where they unsuccessfully faced The Reality (Chance Rizer and Patrick Scott) for the vacant DPW Worlds Tag Team Championship. Drake and Henry competed in the 2023 DPW Tag Team Festival where they defeated Jackson Drake and Jay Malachi in the first rounds, then reigning champions Violence Is Forever (Dominic Garrini and Kevin Ku) in the finals of the tournament which was four-way elimination tag team match disputed for the DPW Tag titles also involving Above The Rest (Gabriel Skye and Tristen Thai) and BestBros (Baliyan Akki and Mei Suruga). Drake and Henry also competed in the 2025 edition of the tournament in which they made it to the finals disputed under the same stipulations in which Miracle Generation (Dustin Waller and Kylon King) defeated reigning tag team champions Grizzled Young Veterans (James Drake and Zack Gibson), and the teams Jake Something and The Beast Mortos, and Drake and Henry.

== Championships and accomplishments ==
- Action Packed Wrestling
  - APW Heavyweight Championship (1 time)
- Atlanta Wrestling Entertainment
  - AWE Tag Team Championship (1 time) – with Anthony Henry
- Deadlock Pro-Wrestling
  - DPW Worlds Tag Team Championship (1 time) – with Anthony Henry
  - DPW Tag Festival (2023) – with Anthony Henry
  - DPW Awards (2 time)
    - Tag Team of the Year (2022, 2023) – with Anthony Henry
- Evolve
  - Evolve Tag Team Championship (1 time) – with Anthony Henry
- Freelance Wrestling
  - Freelance World Tag Team Championship (1 time) – with Anthony Henry
- Palmetto Championship Wrestling
  - PCW Heavyweight Championship (3 times)
- Premier Wrestling Federation
  - PWF Tag Team Championship (1 time) – with Zane Dawson
- Premiere Wrestling Xperience
  - PWX Innovative Television Championship (1 time)
- Pro Wrestling Illustrated
  - Ranked No. 137 of the top 500 singles wrestlers in the PWI 500 in 2021
- Rockstar Pro Wrestling
  - Rockstar Pro Tag Team Championship (1 time)
- Xtreme Wrestling Alliance
  - XWA Tag Team Championship (1 time) - with Anthony Henry
- Why We Wrestle
  - WWW Tag Team Championship (1 time) – with Billy Buck
- World Wrestling Network
  - WWN Championship (1 time)
