= Anthony Henry (wrestler) =

American professional wrestler

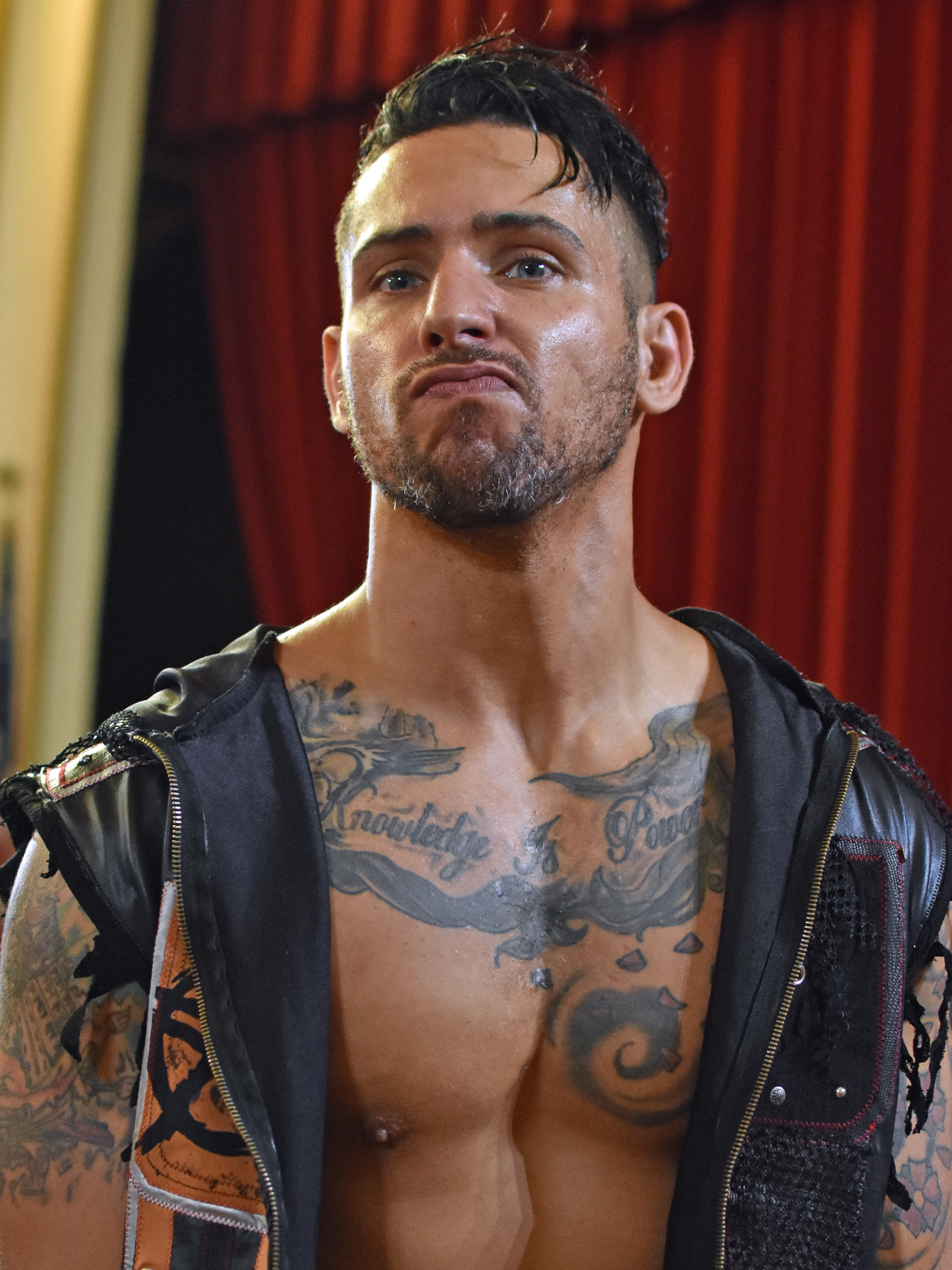
- Henry in 2018

Personal information
- Born: December 25, 1983 (age 42) Augusta, Georgia, U.S.

Professional wrestling career
- Ring name(s): Anthony Henry; Asher Hale
- Billed height: 5 ft 10 in (1.78 m)
- Billed weight: 180 lb (82 kg)
- Billed from: Augusta, Georgia
- Trained by: Sal Rinauro; Todd Sexton
- Debut: 2002

Anthony Henry (born December 25, 1983) is an American professional wrestler, primarily performs on the independent circuit. He is best known for All Elite Wrestling (AEW) and Ring of Honor (ROH). He is one-half of the tag team the WorkHorsemen with JD Drake.

He is known for his work in independent promotions including Evolve, World Wrestling Network (WWN), Full Impact Pro (FIP), Premiere Wrestling Xperience (PWX), National Wrestling Alliance territories, Atlanta Wrestling Entertainment (AWE) promotions and Deadlock Pro-Wrestling (DPW), where he is a three-time NWA/APW (Alternative Pro Wrestling) North Georgia Champion, one-time Evolve Tag Team Champion, one-time FIP World Heavyweight Champion, one-time PWX Heavyweight Champion, and one-time DPW Worlds Tag Team Champion. He also worked for WWE under the ring name Asher Hale.

== Professional wrestling career ==
=== Premiere Wrestling Xperience (2012–2018) ===
Henry debuted on May 5, 2012 at Premiere Wrestling Xperience's PWX Queen City Chaos, losing a singles match against Drew Myers. He returned two years later on February 15, 2014 at Rise Of A Champion IX, where he competed in a Three-Way No. 1 Contendership match for the PWX Innovative Television Championship, but lost to Lance Lude. On March 15 at Enemy Territory: Dawn Of A New Day, Henry teamed with Billy Brash to challenge reigning champions team Los Ben Dejos for the PWX Tag Team Championship but did not succeed in winning the titles. He did not receive any further title opportunities in PWX during the course of 2014 and 2015. On June 18 at Xpect Everything, Henry competed in a Four-Way Elimination match won by John Skyler against Henry, Corey Hollis and the reigning champion Sami Callihan for the PWX Heavyweight Champion. During a two-night event first held on November 19, Henry competed in the 2016 X 16 Tournament. He would go on to defeat Martin Stone, Trevor Lee, Zack Sabre Jr., and Ethan Case to become the winner of the 2016 X 16 Tournament. During his return the following year on February 19, 2017, Henry wrestled at Rise Of A Champion XII, defeating the reigning champion Jake Manning to become the new PWX Heavyweight Champion, marking his first title reign. He successfully retained the title for the course of the time he remained in PWX, wrestling his final match of the year on October 21 at PWX Unsanctioned, defeating his challenger Fred Yehi. The following year on March 25, 2018 at Rise Of A Champion XIII, Henry competed in a Three-Way match during which he lost the Heavyweight Championship against JD Drake and Ethan Case. On July 22, Henry formed a team with JD Drake and entered the 2018 Crockett Cup Tag Team Tournament held by PWX which they went on to win.

=== Atlanta Wrestling Entertainment (2016–2018) ===
Henry debuted on August 7, 2016 at AWE The Summer Of George event, defeating Jimmy Rave. The following year on July 30, 2017 at the Season 3 Finale event, Henry and JD Drake reunited, rebranding their team name as The WorkHorsemen. They competed in a Tag Team Title Four-Way match for the AWE Tag Team Championship against Evan Gelistico and Gary Jay) defeat The Gym Nasty Boyz: (Timmy Lou Retton & White Mike) and Kerry Awful and Nick Iggy. The following year on June 8, 2018 at Red Wedding, The WorkHorsemen defeated the reigning champions Gelistico and Jay to win the AWE Tag Team Championship for the first time. Their final AWE match was on July 29 at HomeGrown '18 successfully defending the GWC Tag Team Titles in a tag match against Awful and Iggy.

=== Evolve (2016–2020) ===
After signing with the World Wrestling Network, Henry made his first match appearance on October 15, 2016 at Evolve 70, where he lost to Darby Allin. On July 28, 2017 at Evolve 88, Henry and Drake defeated team Catch Point (Chris Dickinson and Jaka) to win the Evolve Tag Team Championship for the first time. Two months later on September 22 at Evolve 92, Henry & Drake lost the Tag Team titles to A. C. H. and Ethan Page. Three months later on December 9 at Evolve 96, Henry and Drake challenged team Catch Point (Jaka and Tracy Williams) for the Evolve Tag Team Championship but did not succeed in winning the titles. The following night at Evolve 97, Henry and Drake ended their year defeating KTB and Shane Mercer

Henry & Drake's next Tag Team title opportunity was held on April 5, 2018 at Evolve 102, where they competed in a Four-Way Tag Team Scramble match. On May 20 at Evolve 105, Henry & Drake returned to their team name The WorkHorsemen, challenging the reigning Evolve Tag Team Champions team Catch Point, but did not succeed in winning the titles. On October 28 at Evolve 114, Henry competed in a Six-Way Ladder Match for the WWN Championship, ending with his tag team partner JD Drake winning the match. On November 9 at Evolve 115, The WorkHorsemen had the rare opportunity to compete against WWE talent, as they wrestled the guest tag team from WWE NXT and reigning champions the Street Profits (Angelo Dawkins & Montez Ford) for the Evolve Tag Team Championship, but did not succeed in winning the Tag Team titles. Henry finished the year at Evolve 118, losing a singles match against WWE NXT guest wrestler Kassius Ohno.

Returning on January 18, 2019 at Evolve 119, Henry defeated Curt Stallion.

=== Full Impact Pro (2017–2021) ===
Henry first appeared on January 8, 2017 at FIP Everything Burns 2017 in a Contract Prize match, eventually won by Teddy Stigma. He finished his debut year on June 17 at FIP In Full Force 2017, defeating Maxwell Jacob Friedman. Returning on May 25, 2018 at FIP Ascension 2018, Henry challenged reigning champion Austin Theory for the FIP World Heavyweight Championship but did not succeed in winning the title. Four months later on September 30 at FIP Accelerate 2018, Henry defeated Theory in a title rematch to win the FIP World Heavyweight Championship for the first time. He successfully defended the title on November 30 at FIP Full Force 2018, defeating A. R. Fox. On February 21, 2020, Henry lost the FIP World Heavyweight Championship to Jon Davis at Everything Burns 2020.

=== WWE (2021) ===
On January 19, 2021, Henry signed a contract with WWE, with plans to train at the WWE Performance Center. On the May 4 episode of NXT, Henry made his TV debut under the new ring name of Asher Hale, in a losing effort to Cameron Grimes. Hale also made his 205 Live debut on the May 14 episode, defeating Ariya Daivari. The following week, he lost against Ari Sterling. The week after, he upset veteran Tony Nese, making him tap out. Hale continued to wrestle through the months on 205 Live, making his last appearance on the July 30 episode in a losing effort to Drake Maverick. On August 6, Hale was released from his WWE contract.

=== All Elite Wrestling (2021–2024) ===
During the September 11 tapings of AEW Dark, Henry made his debut for All Elite Wrestling, facing Eddie Kingston in a losing effort. Henry faced Miro on the July 1, 2023 edition of AEW Collision, losing by submission. On April 1, 2024, Henry was released from his AEW contract; three days later, during a media call, AEW owner Tony Khan said that he would offer Henry a new contract as soon as Henry recovers from a broken jaw.

== Championships and accomplishments ==
- Alternative Pro Wrestling
  - APW North Georgia Championship (3 times)
  - APW Tag Team Championship (1 time) – with Brandon Parker
- Atlanta Wrestling Entertainment
  - AWE Tag Team Championship (1 time) – with JD Drake
  - GWC Tag Team Championship (1 time) – with JD Drake
- ACTION Wrestling
  - ACTION Championship (1 time)
- Deadlock Pro-Wrestling
  - DPW Worlds Tag Team Championship (1 time) – with JD Drake
  - Tag Festival Tournament (2023) – with JD Drake
  - DPW Awards (2 time)
    - Tag Team of the Year (2022, 2023) – with JD Drake
- Evolve
  - Evolve Tag Team Championship (1 time) – with JD Drake
- Flatline Pro Wrestling
  - FPW Heavyweight Championship (1 time)
- Full Impact Pro
  - FIP World Heavyweight Championship (1 time)
- Freelance Wrestling
  - Freelance Wrestling Tag Team Championship (1 time) – with JD Drake
- Livewire Wrestling
  - LW Tag Team Championship (1 time) - with Brandon Parker
  - LW Championship (1 time)
- National Wrestling Alliance
  - NWA Anarchy Tag Team Championship (1 time) – with Dustin Knight
  - NWA Anarchy Young Lions Championship (5 times)
  - NWA North Georgia Championship (2 times)
  - NWA Southern States Championship (2 times)
- Legacy Wrestling
  - PRIME 1 Tournament (2017)
- Intense Wrestling Entertainment
  - IWE New Age Championship (1 time)
- Pro Wrestling Bushido
  - King Of Bushido 7 Tournament (2018)
- Pro Wrestling Illustrated
  - Ranked No. 153 of the top 500 singles wrestlers in the PWI 500 in 2019
- Premiere Wrestling Xperience
  - PWX World Heavyweight Championship (1 time)
  - X 16 Tournament (2016)
  - Crockett Cup Tag Team Tournament (2018) – with JD Drake
- Rockstar Pro Wrestling
  - Rockstar Pro Tag Team Championship (1 time) –with JD Drake
- Xtreme Wrestling Alliance
  - XWA Heavyweight Championship (2 times)
  - XWA Tag Team Championship (1 time) – with JD Drake
