= Dragon Gate USA =

American professional wrestling promotion

- Acronym: DG-USA
- Founded: 2009; 2025 (revival)
- Defunct: 2015
- Style: Puroresu; Lucha libre
- Headquarters: Philadelphia, Pennsylvania, U.S.
- Founders: Satoru Oji (President); Gabe Sapolsky (Vice president); Sal Hamaoui (COO)
- Parent: WWNLive (2009–2015); WWE Legacy Department (WWE) (2020–present); Dragongate (2025-present)

Dragon Gate USA (DGUSA) is an American professional wrestling promotion founded in 2009 as an international expansion of the Japanese promotion Dragon Gate. Gabe Sapolsky, former head booker of Ring of Honor, served as the promotion's Vice President.

== History ==
Dragon Gate USA featured regular members of the Dragon Gate roster, along with notable American talent. All Dragon Gate titles and champions were recognized by Dragon Gate USA.

In June 2009, it was announced that Dragon Gate USA had signed an agreement to film its shows for pay-per-view broadcast. In August 2009, it was announced that Dragon Gate USA had signed an agreement with The Fight Network to air DGUSA content on television.

The first Open the Freedom Gate Champion was crowned following a tournament held at DGUSA Freedom Fight on November 28, 2009. This was the main title of Dragon Gate USA.

On September 7, 2010, Dragon Gate USA announced a partnership with Go Fight Live and that their first live internet pay-per-view, Bushido: Way of the Warrior (later renamed Bushido: Code of the Warrior), would be taking place on October 29.

In the fall of 2010, DGUSA announced that it would be holding a tournament to crown the first Open the United Gate Champions, which was their tag team champions. It was announced on December 13, 2010, that the tournament would be a four team round robin tournament that would take place over three shows from January 28 through January 30, 2011.

On November 25, 2011, Dragon Gate USA and Evolve announced the unification of the two promotions. Dragon Gate USA and Evolve will still promote separate events, but the two share rosters, including stables, and Evolve recognized Dragon Gate USA's Open the Freedom Gate Championship and Open the United Gate Championship as its top two championships, until establishing its own championship, the Evolve Championship in 2012. On September 18, 2013, Vito LoGrasso announced that his new Wrestling School signed an agreement to be the Development Center for DGUSA.

In November 2014, Dragon Gate USA, along with Evolve, Full Impact Pro (FIP) and Shine Wrestling, all under the WWNLive banner, held a tour of China. The following month, WWNLive announced a long-term deal with Great-Wall International Sports Management for regular tours of Asia, starting in the spring of 2015. On December 22, WWNLive announced it was putting Dragon Gate USA on an indefinite hiatus until the promotion could secure more Japanese wrestlers for their shows.

In 2015, WWNLive opened a training facility in Trinity, Florida named "World Wrestling Network Academy", which Dragon Gate USA shares with Evolve, FIP and Shine.

On July 2, 2020, Dragon Gate USA's video library along with Evolve's assets were bought by WWE.

On January 31, 2025, Dragon Gate announced that the DGUSA brand would return on April 16, 2025 at the Palms Casino Resort in Las Vegas, Nevada as part of Game Changer Wrestling's (GCW) Collective under the title Dragon Gate USA The Rebirth during WrestleMania weekend. Another show was also announced with Pro Wrestling Revolution during the West Coast Pro/DPW/Prestige Vegas event at MEET Las Vegas titled The Gate Of Revolution

=== Uprising ===
Uprising
- Promotion: Dragon Gate USA
- Date: May 8, 2010 (aired July 9, 2010)
- City: Mississauga, Ontario, Canada
- Venue: International Centre

Uprising was a professional wrestling pay-per-view (PPV) event produced by Dragon Gate USA that was taped May 8, 2010 at the Mississauga International Centre in Mississauga, Ontario and aired on July 9, 2010.

No.	Results	Stipulations
1	Masaaki Mochizuki defeated Akira Tozawa	Singles match
2	Gran Akuma defeated Tyson Dux	Singles match
3	Jon Moxley defeated Jimmy Jacobs	No Disqualification match
4	Naruki Doi and PAC defeated Mike Quackenbush and Jigsaw	Tag team match
5	Rip Impact vs. Johnny Wave ended in a no contest	Singles match
6	Shingo and YAMATO defeated CIMA and Dragon Kid	Tag Team Match
7	BxB Hulk (c) defeated Masato Yoshino	Singles match for the Open the Freedom Gate Championship
(c) / – the champion(s) heading into the match

== Partnerships ==
Working agreements between Dragon Gate USA and the following promotions have led to interchanges in talent. Also, matches from these promotions have appeared on Dragon Gate USA DVD releases.

- Chikara (established April 26, 2009)
- All American Wrestling (established June 15, 2009)
- Hybrid Wrestling (established June 15, 2009)
- Full Impact Pro (established September 28, 2009)
- Jeff Peterson Memorial Cup (established October 13, 2009)
- Women Superstars Uncensored (established October 14, 2009)
- Maximum Pro Wrestling (established March 3, 2010)
- Rampage Pro Wrestling
- Combat Zone Wrestling
- New York Wrestling Connection
- Insanity Pro Wrestling

== Championships ==
Championship	Last champion(s)	Date retired	Date Established	Previous champion (s)	Inaugural champion
Open the Freedom Gate Championship	Timothy Thatcher	August 15, 2015	November 28, 2009	Drew Galloway	BxB Hulk
Open the United Gate Championship	Ronin (Johnny Gargano and Rich Swann)	May 30, 2015	January 30, 2011	The Premier Athlete Brand (Anthony Nese, Caleb Konley and Trent Barreta)	WORLD-1 (Masato Yoshino and PAC)
