= Evolve (professional wrestling) =

Defunct American professional wrestling promotion

- Industry: Professional wrestling
- Founded: 2010
- Founders: Gabe Sapolsky
- Defunct: 2020
- Fate: Assets purchased by WWE
- Successor: Evolve (WWE brand)
- Headquarters: Philadelphia, Pennsylvania

Evolve (stylized all caps and also known as Evolve Wrestling) was an American professional wrestling promotion founded in 2010 by former Ring of Honor booker and Dragon Gate USA vice president, Gabe Sapolsky.

The company featured a roster of wrestlers from all over America, as well as several competitors from Japan. The promotion had a close working relationship with sister promotion Dragon Gate USA until Dragon Gate USA's closure in August 2015. In the same year, Evolve formed a relationship with WWE, allowing WWE to scout Evolve talent and potentially sign them. On July 2, 2020, WWE officially purchased Evolve.

In March 2025, WWE relaunched Evolve as a new brand division with a new series titled WWE Evolve on Tubi.

== History ==
In 2009, Gabe Sapolsky announced a new wrestling promotion via some viral videos featuring one of the company's competitors, Jimmy Jacobs. After this more videos were produced promoting more performers, as well as featuring blogs written by the wrestlers about their feelings regarding the company. The first show, Evolve 1: Richards vs. Ibushi, was held on January 16, 2010, in Rahway, New Jersey at the Rahway Recreational Center.

During interviews with wrestling newsletter Figure 4 Weekly on its radio show, Sapolsky told editor Bryan Alvarez that Evolve would have stronger emphasis on rules and would not limit anyone based on their own respective style of wrestling in favor of showcasing the talent's individual strengths and covering up their weaknesses. On January 29, 2010, Sapolsky announced that Evolve would no longer be booking Davey Richards as he had signed a new contract with Ring of Honor.

The concept of the promotion was initially an emphasis on the wrestlers' win–loss records. They divided the company into two divisions: singles wrestlers and tag teams. As per the website, some wrestlers would need to earn their way onto the roster by winning a qualifying match, but that since has been dropped.

On November 25, 2011, Evolve and Dragon Gate USA announced the unification of the two promotions. Evolve and Dragon Gate USA will still promote separate events, but the two share rosters, including stables, and Evolve recognizes Dragon Gate USA's Open the Freedom Gate Championship and Open the United Gate Championship as its top two championships.

In February 2013, Evolve announced that they would be holding a tournament to crown the first Evolve Champion as they were eliminating the records system at that time. The tournament was held in Secaucus, New Jersey, at WrestleCon in April 2013. Evolve used the records of the talent to determine the seedings in the tournament; the top two were Chuck Taylor (10–5) and Ricochet (5–2), and both received byes into the second round. On April 5, A. R. Fox defeated Sami Callihan in the final to become the inaugural champion. On September 18, 2013, Vito LoGrasso announced that his new Wrestling School signed an agreement to be the Development Center for Evolve.

In November 2014, Evolve, along with Dragon Gate USA (DGUSA), Full Impact Pro (FIP) and Shine Wrestling, all under the WWNLive banner, held a tour of China. The following month, WWNLive announced a long-term deal with Great-Wall International Sports Management for regular tours of Asia, starting in the spring of 2015.

In 2015, WWNLive opened a training facility in Trinity, Florida named "World Wrestling Network Academy", which Evolve shares with DGUSA, FIP and Shine.

During 2015, Evolve entered a relationship with WWE. Evolve's wrestlers were featured on WWE.com, while NXT wrestlers Sami Zayn, Chad Gable and Jason Jordan took part in Evolve events in non-wrestling roles. In January 2016, NXT General Manager William Regal and WWE COO Triple H attended Evolve 54. As part of the relationship, it was announced in March 2016 that Evolve would hold qualifying matches for WWE's Cruiserweight Classic.

On April 1 and 2, 2016, Evolve held shows at Eddie Deen's Ranch in the build-up to WrestleMania 32.

On October 24, 2016, WWNLive and FloSports announced a new streaming service, which would host events held by the WWNLive promotions, including Evolve.

Evolve was the subject of the Viceland documentary, The Wrestlers, Episode 1.

On July 13, 2019, Evolve held its 10th Anniversary Celebration, an event celebrating the 10th anniversary of Dragon Gate USA's founding. The event was streamed on the WWE Network. This marked the first Evolve event and the first independent wrestling event to air on the WWE Network.

On July 2, 2020, it was announced that after months of negotiation, WWE had purchased Evolve, giving them full rights to the name and video library.

== Revival ==
In January 2025, it was reported that WWE were planning to revive Evolve as a brand. The company trademarked the name "Evolve" on January 30, 2025, with the first set of Evolve tapings under WWE set to be held at the WWE Performance Center on February 7, replacing WWE NXT Level Up, which was cancelled in December 2024. During the Royal Rumble on February 1, WWE announced that WWE Evolve would premiere on Tubi on March 5.

== Championships ==
Championship	Last champion(s)	Date retired	Location	Notes
Evolve Championship	Josh Briggs	July 2, 2020	New York City, NY	Defeated Austin Theory at Evolve 139
Evolve Tag Team Championship	Besties in the World (Davey Vega and Mat Fitchett)	July 2, 2020	Chicago, IL	Defeated A. R. Fox and Leon Ruff at Evolve 142
WWN Championship	Austin Theory	July 13, 2019	Philadelphia, Pennsylvania	Defeated JD Drake in a Title Unification match, with Theory's Evolve Championship also on the line, at Evolve 131
Open the Freedom Gate Championship	Timothy Thatcher	August 15, 2015	Woodside, Queens	Defeated Drew Galloway at Evolve 45. Thatcher handed the title to Johnny Gargano, rendering it vacant and inactive
Open the United Gate Championship	Ronin (Johnny Gargano and Rich Swann)	May 30, 2015	Woodside, Queens	Defeated Premier Athlete Brand (Anthony Nese and Caleb Konley) at Evolve 42. Gargano vacated and retired the titles
