= WWNLive =

Professional wrestling promotion and online streaming website

World Wrestling Network
- Acronym: WWNLive
- Founded: 2001 (DVD company); 2010 (Governing body)
- Headquarters: United States
- Founder: Sal Hamaoui
- Owner: Sal Hamaoui
- Website: http://www.wwnlive.com/

The World Wrestling Network is an American professional wrestling organization known for and branded after its video streaming service, WWNLive. WWNLive hosts content both from WWN's "brands", including Full Impact Pro (FIP) and Shine Wrestling, as well as content from third-party organizations.

== History ==
World Wrestling Network was founded by Sal Hamaoui and Tony Valamontes in 2001 as a DVD company before it later evolved into an internet streaming and video on demand business. In 2003, WWNLive began producing FIP DVDs.

In November 2014, Evolve Wrestling, Dragon Gate USA (DGUSA), Full Impact Pro (FIP) and Shine Wrestling held a tour of China under the WWNLive banner. The following month, WWNLive announced a long-term deal with Great-Wall International Sports Management for regular tours of Asia, starting in the spring of 2015.

In 2015, WWNLive opened a training facility in Trinity, Florida named the "World Wrestling Network Academy". That year, Evolve began a partnership with WWE. Evolve's wrestlers were featured on WWE.com, while NXT wrestlers Sami Zayn, Chad Gable and Jason Jordan took part in Evolve events in non-wrestling roles. In January 2016, NXT General Manager William Regal and WWE COO Triple H attended Evolve 54. As part of the relationship, it was announced in March 2016 that Evolve would hold qualifying matches for WWE's Cruiserweight Classic.

On October 24, 2016, WWNLive and FloSports announced a new streaming service to launch on November 4. Through the service, subscribers can access both live streaming events as well as events from WWNLive's on-demand library, dating back to 2003.

On November 22, 2016, it was announced that WWNLive would be debuting a new promotion named Style Battle on January 7, 2017. Also announced was the creation of the WWN Championship on April 1, 2017.

On September 21, 2017, it was reported that FloSports had filed a $1 million lawsuit against WWNLive for breach of contract and alleged misrepresentation of iPPV and VOD buyrates. WWNLive, meanwhile, claimed that FloSports had failed to live up to their contractual obligations. Because of the lawsuit, FloSports pulled all future WWNLive events from its streaming service. The following December, WWNLive launched a replacement streaming service, Club WWN.

In July 2020, Evolve's assets were sold to WWE and Sapolsky left WWN. A few weeks later, WWN announced the creation of Grindhouse, a new brand promoted by Eddie Kingston.

== Brands ==
=== Active ===
Promotion	Key People	State	Years
Full Impact Pro	Sal Hamaoui	Largo, Florida	2009–present
Shine Wrestling	Dave Prazak	Ybor City, Florida	2012–present

=== Defunct ===
Promotion	Key People	State	Years
Dragon Gate USA	Gabe Sapolsky	Philadelphia, Pennsylvania	2009–2015 (Library owned by WWE)
Evolve Wrestling	Gabe Sapolsky	Philadelphia, Pennsylvania	2009–2020
Style Battle	Gabe Sapolsky	Ybor City, Florida	2017–2020
American Combat Wrestling	5th Avenue Entertainment	Port Richey, Florida	2001–2021

== Championships ==
Active

Championship	Current champion(s)	Reign	Date won	Days	Location	Previous champion(s)
WWN Proving Ground Heavyweight Championship	Sage Scott	1	February 3, 2025	619	Clearwater, Florida	Krieger
WWN Multimedia Championship	Richard Adonis	1	June 2, 2025	500	Clearwater, Florida	Sideshow
WWN Proving Ground Tag Team Championship	The Miami Boyz (Chris Malachite and Puma Johnson)	2	May 12, 2025	521	Clearwater, Florida	L'Armeria (Damian Jemini and TJ Brady)
WWN Proving Ground Women's Championship	Scotti Sosa	1	June 8, 2025	494	Clearwater, Florida	Inaugural
FIP World Heavyweight Championship	August Artois	1	December 10, 2023	1,040	Clearwater, Florida	Brian Brock
FIP World Tag Team Championship	The Emerald Empire (Devin Diaz and Jonathan Hudson)	1	June 8, 2025	494	Clearwater, Florida	LJ Cleary and Rich Swann
FIP Florida Heritage Championship	Steven Frick	1	January 12, 2025	641	Clearwater, Florida	Sideshow
Shine Championship	Kelsey Raegan	1	March 9, 2025	585	Clearwater, Florida	Ivelisse
Shine Tag Team Championship	Las Sicarias (Evie De La Rosa and Labrava)	1 (1, 2)	December 15, 2024	669	Clearwater, Florida	Kelsey Raegan and Lindsay Snow
Shine Nova Championship	Kelsey Heather	1	July 12, 2024	825	Clearwater, Florida	Amber Nova

Defunct

Championship	Final champion	Date retired	Notes
WWN Championship	Austin Theory	July 13, 2019	The title was then retired without an official announcement.
ACW Combat Championship	Danny Vincent	August 27, 2023	The title was then retired without an official announcement.
ACW Cruiserweight Championship	Tyler Uriah	August 4, 2023	The title was then retired without an official announcement.
ACW Heavyweight Championship	Lucky Ali	August 27, 2023	The title was then retired without an official announcement.
ACW Women's Championship	Myka Madrid	August 27, 2023	The title was then retired without an official announcement.
ACW Trinity Championship	Nooie Lee	2015	The title was then retired without an official announcement.
