= Chris Hero =

American professional wrestler (born 1979)

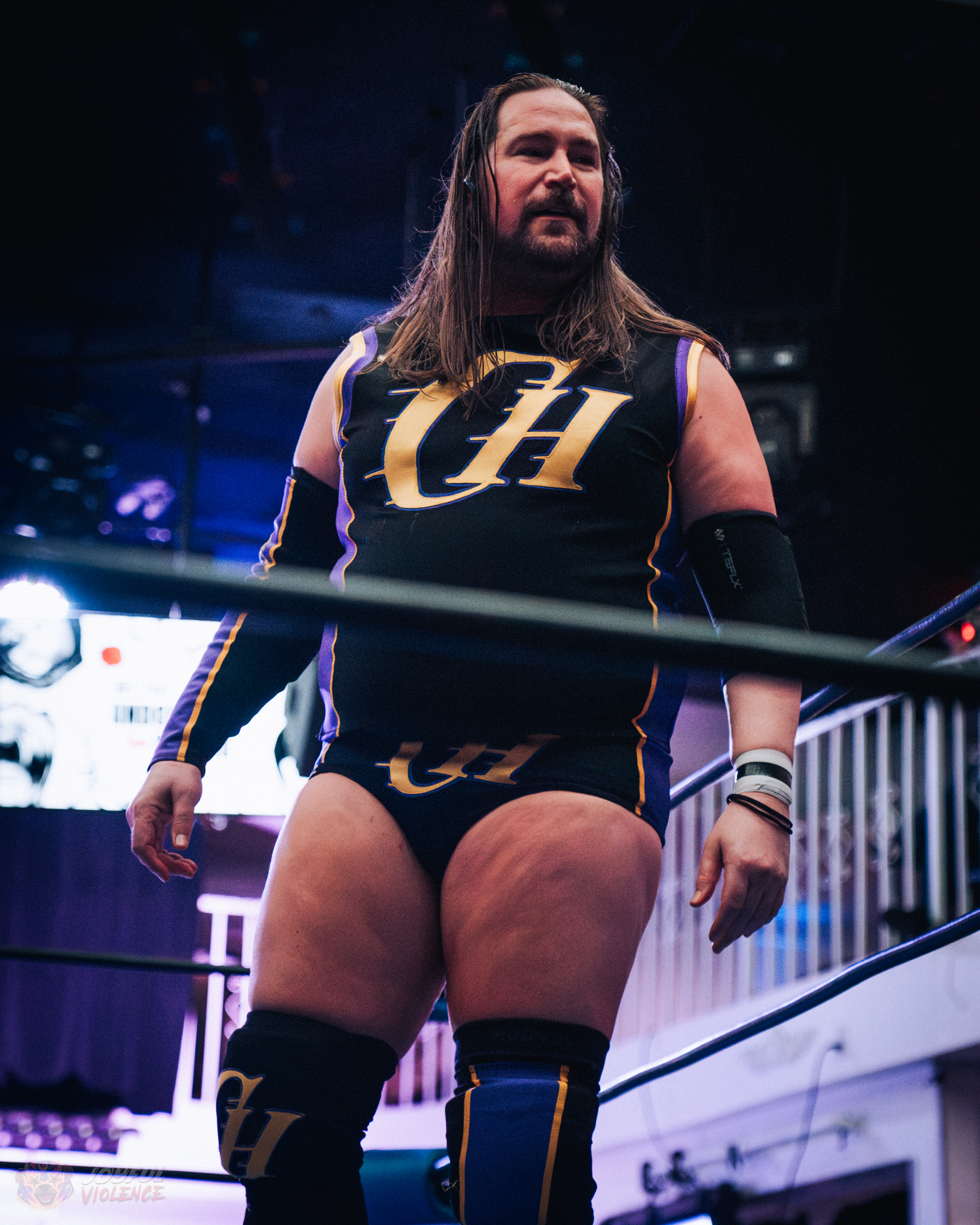
- Hero in 2024

Personal information
- Born: William Christopher Spradlin; December 24, 1979 (age 46) Dayton, Ohio, U.S.

Professional wrestling career
- Ring name(s): Brother Hero; Chris Hero; Chris Hyde; Kassius Ohno; Wife Beater
- Billed height: 6 ft 4 in (193 cm)
- Billed weight: 270 lb (122 kg)
- Billed from: "Metropolis"; Dayton, Ohio
- Trained by: Dory Funk Jr. Ian Rotten; Les Thatcher; Tracy Smothers; Dave Taylor; Fit Finlay; William Regal; Skayde; Johnny Saint; Pro Wrestling Noah; Marshall Kauffman (boxing)
- Debut: September 12, 1998

William Christopher Spradlin (born December 24, 1979), better known by his ring name Chris Hero, is an American professional wrestler and trainer. He is signed to All Elite Wrestling (AEW) as a coach.

Hero has worked for a number of independent wrestling promotions, including Pro Wrestling Guerrilla (PWG), Ring of Honor (ROH), Independent Wrestling Association Mid-South, Combat Zone Wrestling (CZW) and Chikara, as well as Pro Wrestling Noah in Japan. Hero has had two stints in WWE, both as part of their development territory NXT, under the ring name Kassius Ohno. His second tenure with the company saw him work as a "player-coach" for the trainees in NXT and NXT UK.

For years Hero teamed up with Claudio Castagnoli as the "Kings of Wrestling", winning various tag team championships and tournaments such as Chikara Campeonatos de Parejas, Tag World Grand Prix 2006, CZW World Tag Team Championship, JCW Tag Team Championship and the ROH World Tag Team Championship.

== Professional wrestling career ==
=== Training; early career (1998–2000) ===
After graduating from Northmont High School in Clayton, Ohio, Spradlin decided to train as a professional wrestler in the summer of 1998. After undergoing some initial training in Middletown, Ohio, Spradlin debuted on September 12, 1998 in Xenia, Ohio wrestling Shawn "HeartThrob" Halsey in the Unified Championship Wrestling promotion. Spradlin's initial training in Middletown was under the supervision of a small-time promoter named Gary Goffinet. Spradlin trained for a little while alongside his friend, Adam Ghazee, under a wrestler by the name of Bo Dacious. Bo had trained previously under Charlie Fulton at the Monster Factory. At the suggestion of Matt Stryker, Spradlin underwent further training at Les Thatcher's Cincinnati-based HWA Main Event Wrestling Camp between May 1999 and November 1999. In December 1999, he traveled to Ocala, Florida to train under Dory Funk Jr. at the Funkin' Conservatory professional wrestling school.

As Spradlin wrestled wearing what is popularly known as a "wifebeater" style of shirt, he began using the ring name "Wife Beater". He continued to use the Wife Beater character until a women's group, offended by the gimmick, organized a boycott of a show on which Spradlin was wrestling in Platteville, Wisconsin. The character was discussed on the talk show Politically Incorrect. However, Spradlin was not mentioned by name. After Spradlin was booked for a series of family-friendly shows for NWA West Virginia / Ohio, he changed his ring name to "Chris Hero". He wrestled his last matches as Wife Beater in 2000.

In 2000, Hero began working for the Indiana-based Independent Wrestling Association Mid-South, where he received supplementary training from Ian Rotten. In the following years, he spent a great deal of time working with Tracy Smothers on IWA Mid-South shows, and he now credits Smothers as his mentor. In October 2002, Hero attended the Blue Bloods Wrestling Camp, operated by UK wrestlers Dave Taylor, William Regal and Dave Finlay. In July 2003, Chikara brought in Skayde from Último Dragón's Toryumon Gym in Mexico City to teach some special lucha libre clinics. Hero took part in the training sessions and was able to add the Lucha style to his repertoire. He attended Skayde sessions in Minnesota, Pennsylvania and Mexico City between 2003 and 2006.

=== Independent Wrestling Association Mid-South (2000–2007) ===
Hero debuted for IWA Mid-South on July 1, 2000, in a losing attempt versus Harry Palmer. In his first year in the promotion, he won the annual Sweet Science 16 tournament (now known as the Ted Petty Invitational or TPI), defeating four other wrestlers in the process (Colt Cabana, American Kickboxer, Ace Steel and Harry Palmer), and unsuccessfully challenged Sabu for the NWA World Heavyweight Championship at Bloodfeast 2000. Hero engaged in feuds with the Suicide Kid, American Kickboxer, Mark Wolf, and the Rugby Thug.

On October 20, 2001, in Charlestown, Indiana, Hero won the IWA Mid-South Heavyweight Championship from the champion Trent Baker. He held the title until December 5 of that year, when he lost to CM Punk. He regained the title on July 12, 2002, in Clarksville, Indiana, defeating Colt Cabana, and lost it to M-Dogg 20 three months later on October 5 in Clarksville. He won the title for a third time on February 7, 2003, in Clarksville, pinning CM Punk in a match that lasted over ninety minutes. His third reign lasted until June 7, when he lost to Mark Wolf. Hero regained the title in a match with Danny Daniels on July 12, 2003, after Mark Wolf had vacated the title. Hero lost it for a fourth and final time to Danny Daniels less than a month later on August 2.

During the fall of 2005, Hero and Arik Cannon continued their feud that had started years before in IWA Mid South. At the end of it, Hero became a villain after being eliminated by Cannon in the third round of the 2005 TPI. He later turned his back on Rotten, his trainees Trik Davis, Mickie Knuckles, Bryce Remsburg and everyone else that had befriended him. Hero has since destroyed the IWA Mid South Heavyweight title belt. At the end of 2005, he won the third annual Revolution Strong Style Tournament, defeating Necro Butcher in the finals.

=== Chikara ===
==== SuperFriends (2002–2005) ====
On May 25, 2002, at Chikara's inaugural event, Hero teamed with CM Punk and Colt Cabana, calling themselves the Gold Bond Mafia, in a losing effort against the Black T-shirt Squad of Reckless Youth, Mike Quackenbush and Don Montoya. In July 2003, the team of Chris Hero and Mike Quackenbush, the "SuperFriends", was formed. The SuperFriends defeated Toryumon representatives Skayde and Koichiro Arai in the first round of the 2003 Tag World Grand Prix, then wrestled Swi$$ Money Holding (Claudio Castagnoli and Ares) to a 30-minute time limit draw, eliminating both teams from the tournament. In July 2004, Hero moved to Pennsylvania to work alongside Mike Quackenbush at the Chikara Wrestle Factory. In April 2005, the school moved from Allentown, Pennsylvania to the former ECW Arena in Philadelphia, Pennsylvania. The school was renamed the CZW / Chikara Wrestle Factory and became operated by Quackenbush, Hero and Jorge "Skayde" Rivera. In February 2005, the SuperFriends made it to the finals of Chikara's three-day, thirty-two-team tournament, the Tag World Grand Prix. Late in the match, Hero turned on Quackenbush and formed an alliance with Claudio Castagnoli and Arik Cannon. He later referred to the trio as The Kings of Wrestling". He lost the Jeff Peterson Memorial Cup! to Justice in a match with Roderick Strong on June 5, 2004.

==== Kings of Wrestling (2005–2007) ====
Hero's faction feuded with Quackenbush and his allies for the entirety of 2005. At the closing of the Chikara "season", Arik Cannon departed from the group, leaving Hero and Castagnoli as the remaining "Kings of Wrestling". At the opening of the 2006 Chikara "season", Hero and Castagnoli defeated Equinox and Hydra, Ranmaru and Sumie Sakai, the North Star Express (Ryan Cruz and Darin Corbin), Incoherence (Hallowicked and Delirious), and finally Team Dragondoor (Skayde and Milano Collection A.T.) to become the first Chikara Campeones de Parejas. On November 17, 2006 at the Chikara show Brick in Reading Pennsylvania, Hero and Castagnoli lost the Chikara tag title to Team F.I.S.T (Icarus and Gran Akuma) in a 2 out of 3 falls match. Following the match, Hero and Team F.I.S.T turned on Castagnoli and engaged in a beat down. This was done due to Castagnoli signing a developmental deal with the World Wrestling Entertainment (WWE). Upon Chikara's season return in February, King of Trios, Hero was scheduled to be teaming with his Team F.I.S.T partners to enter the tournament. However, Hero was booked to make his Pro Wrestling Noah debut in Japan, so it was stated that F.I.S.T. did not want Hero on their team and instead went on to recruit Chuck Taylor as a new member of the Kings of Wrestling.

On the other hand, Chris Hero had his sights set on other things when he returned to Chikara in March 2007. After Claudio Castagnoli, who had been released by WWE before making his debut for them, defeated numerous opponents and seemed focused on getting his revenge on his former partner, Hero decided he wanted to win back the control of Castagnoli. At Chikara's April 'Rey De Voladores' tournament Chris Hero faced Claudio Castagnoli in a non-tournament match in which the winner would gain control of the loser. Mike Quackenbush was the special referee for the contest. Chris Hero won the match, forcing Castagnoli back under the control of Hero. The following month Hero, Castagnoli and Larry Sweeney joined forces with Icarus, Gran Akuma and Chuck Taylor to re-form the Kings of Wrestling as a superstable.

Hero faced "Lightning" Mike Quackenbush at Chikara's May 26 'Aniversario?' show in a match that was two years in the making. Quackenbush won the match with his new submission maneuver, the Chikara Special, a move that Lince Dorado, El Pantera, Equinox and Claudio Castagnoli all used to defeat Hero during the summer of 2007. Many suggested that Hero was affected by a curse and was unable to break the hold. Following another upset loss to Equinox, this time a tag match in Reading, Pennsylvania on November 16, 2007, Hero snapped and tore apart Equinox's mask. Leonard F. Chikarason intervened and scheduled Hero and Equinox for a Mascara contra Caballera (Mask vs. Hair match) to take place the following evening in Hellertown, Pennsylvania. With moments remaining in the match, Equinox managed to apply the Chikara Special, only to have Hero counter out of it and lock on a Chikara Special of his own. Equinox tapped out and was forced to unmask. Hero pointed out, to the crowd, that the man behind the mask was Vin Gerard, a luchador impostor. Previously, Vin had attended the Chikara Wrestle Factory and trained under both Hero and Quackenbush. It was not until Gerard was unable to break through and gain bookings on Chikara shows that he decided to create a false identity in order to wrestle for Chikara.

In late 2007, Hero vacated his spot as a head trainer at the Chikara Wrestle Factory. His spot was assumed by his student and former partner, Claudio Castagnoli. On December 9, 2007, at Stephen Colbert > Bill O'Reilly Hero lost a feud ending match against Castagnoli, subsequently leaving Chikara.

=== Combat Zone Wrestling (2002–2007, 2010, 2013) ===
In May 2002, Hero debuted in Combat Zone Wrestling, wrestling Ruckus. He wrestled a second match later that year teaming with B-Boy against Nate Hatred and Nick Gage for the CZW Tag Team Championship. Hero returned to CZW for a third time in the autumn of 2003, and this time he secured a regular place on the roster. Declaring himself the "Savior" of CZW, Hero defeated Jimmy Rave on May 1, 2004, to become the promotion's Ironman Champion. He became the longest-reigning Ironman Champion before losing the title to B-Boy at the CZW year-end event, Cage of Death, on December 11, 2004. Hero recruited Claudio Castagnoli and Blackjack Marciano to be his "Few Good Men", but shortly thereafter, Marciano disappeared from wrestling altogether, leaving Hero and Castagnoli as a tag team, calling themselves the "Kings of Wrestling". On September 10, 2005, the duo defeated the Tough Crazy Bastards (Necro Butcher and Toby Klein) to become the CZW Tag Team Champions. Hero and Castagnoli held the title and defended them in an ongoing feud with Eddie Kingston and the rest of the BLKOUT faction. While Hero and Castagnoli dropped the title to Eddie Kingston and Joker in February 2006, the feud with BLKOUT continued.

On May 13, 2006, Chris Hero was scheduled to take part in the Best of the Best tournament. However, Hero gave his spot to the CZW World Heavyweight Champion, Ruckus, who promised him a title shot in return. When Ruckus won the Best of the Best tournament, Hero came out and immediately used his title shot to win the CZW World Heavyweight Championship. Hero successfully defended it against Claudio Castagnoli and Necro Butcher. At the Chri$ Ca$h Memorial Show, Eddie Kingston accepted an open challenge from Hero and pinned him to become the new CZW World Heavyweight Champion. On October 14, 2006, the Kings of Wrestling defeated Team Masturbation (Beef Wellington and Excalibur) in the first round, the BLKOUT (Ruckus and Human Tornado) in the second round, and the makeshift team of Justice Pain and the Human Tornado (subbing for Pain's partner in the H8 Club, Nick Gage, who left the building before the match) in a one-night tournament at the CZW show "Last Team Standing" to become two-time CZW Tag Team Champions.

After news broke that Castagnoli would be leaving for the WWE, he and Hero dropped the CZW World Tag Team Championship to the BLKOUT of Sabian and Robbie Mireno on November 11, 2006. On Saturday, April 7, 2007, at Out with the Old, in With the New show, Hero would face long time, heated rival Eddie Kingston in a match where the loser would be forced to leave Combat Zone Wrestling. Hero was defeated following a spinning back fist from Kingston and post-match made a farewell speech to the CZW crowd. Following this CZW owner John Zandig came out and thanked Hero for all he had done for CZW, including the war with Ring of Honor.

More than three years later, on June 12, 2010, Hero made a return to CZW, in a losing effort against Egotistico Fantastico.

Three years later, on December 14, Hero returned to CZW at Cage of Death XV to unsuccessfully challenge Drew Gulak for the CZW World Heavyweight Championship.

=== Total Nonstop Action Wrestling (2003–2004) ===
Hero wrestled off and on for Total Nonstop Action Wrestling in 2003 and 2004. He traveled alongside Nate Webb and Dave Prazak to Nashville, Tennessee on a weekly basis at the urging of Bill Behrens. Hero wrestled on several TNA Xplosion tapings. Although he never appeared on pay per view, he was featured on card #22 of the Pacific released TNA trading card set.

=== Pro Wrestling Guerrilla (2004–2011) ===
Hero's first appearance for the southern California promotion Pro Wrestling Guerrilla was at the January 2004 Tango and Cash Invitational tournament to determine the first ever PWG Tag Team Champions. He and his partner CM Punk defeated The Messiah and Christopher Daniels in the first round, and the Thomaselli Brothers in the second round, but lost to B-Boy and Homicide in the third round. He made his next appearance eight months later in a losing effort against Super Dragon. At the 2005 All Star Weekend – Night One, Hero defeated Chris Sabin. Later in the night, Hero came out and challenged Christopher Daniels for his TNA X Division Championship. Daniels accepted and defeated Hero the next night. A few months later, however, at Zombies (Shouldn't Run), Daniels refused to put the title on the line against Hero and defeated him in a non-title match. At After School Special, Hero became one of Joey Ryan's targets, so that Ryan could prove that he was the best technical wrestler; however, Hero seemed to be out-wrestling Ryan in the match, so Scott Lost came out and helped Ryan win. As a result of the interference, Hero had a match with Lost at the next show, and defeated him. On February 4, 2008, at Card Subject to Change 2, Hero teamed up with Claudio Castagnoli to challenge Super Dragon and Davey Richards for the tag team championship, but failed to win in a 50-minute match. Hero also competed in the 2006 Battle of Los Angeles, but lost to Genki Horiguchi in the first round. Hero appeared with regular tag team partner Claudio Castagnoli in PWG's Dynamite Duumvirate Tag Team Title Tournament, but lost in the first round to the Briscoes. They were on the winning side of an 8-man tag on the second night of the weekend as they were joined by the Trailer Park Boyz (Josh Abercrombie and Nate Webb).

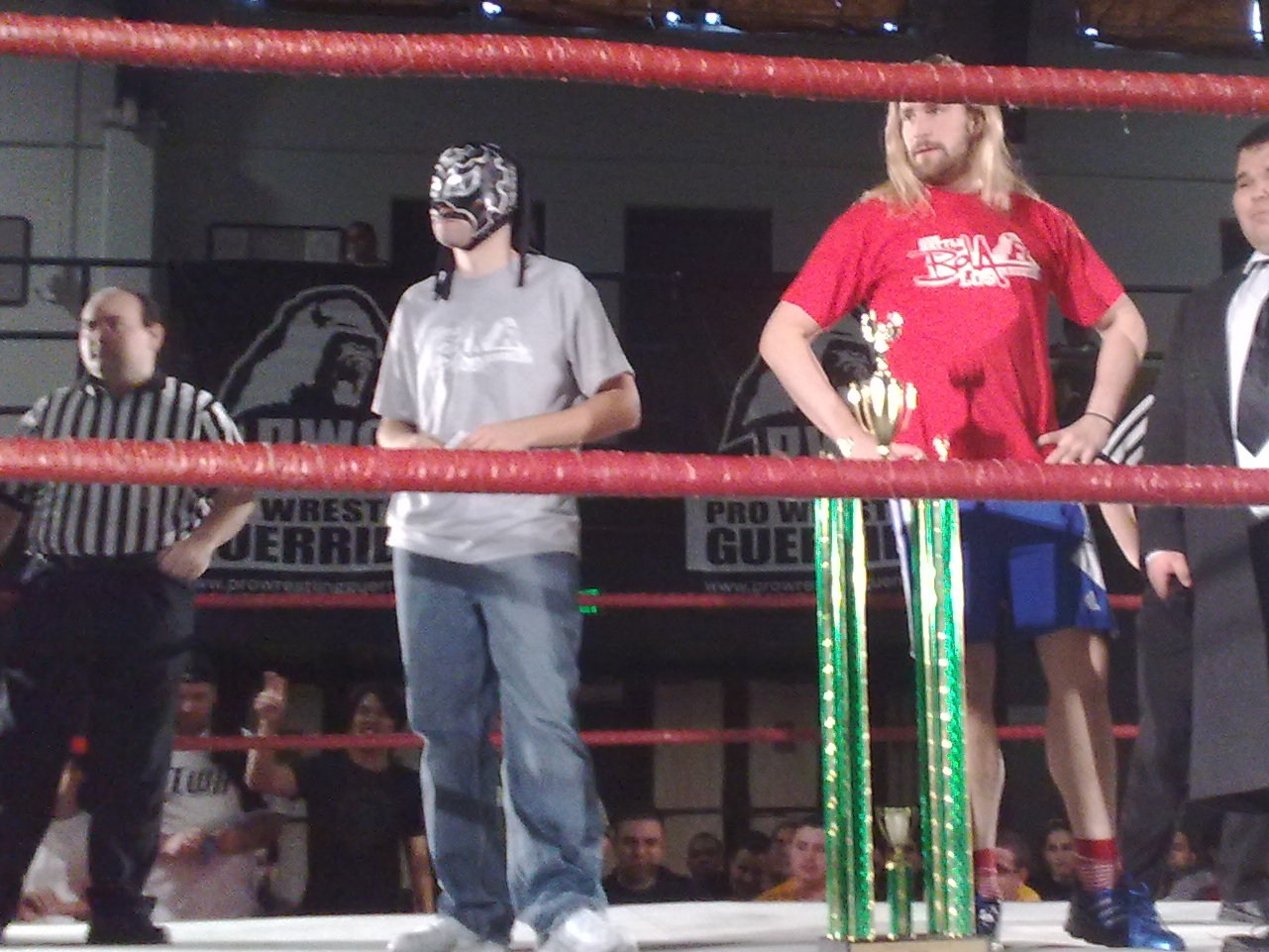
Hero (right) in the ring with Excalibur at the 2008 Battle of Los Angeles

In September 2007 Hero entered a heated feud with The Human Tornado after saving Candice LeRae from her abusive pimp at the second night of the 2007 Battle of Los Angeles. The feud culminated on July 6, 2008, at Life During Wartime in a Guerrilla Warfare steel cage match, where Hero defeated Tornado to become the new PWG World Champion. Hero competed in the 2008 Battle of Los Angeles defeating Necro Butcher in the first round, Scott Lost in the second round, and Bryan Danielson in the semi-finals. In the finals of the tournament Hero was defeated by Low Ki, in a match with only the top rope attached, as the other ropes had been damaged in the previous match. Hero's title was not on the line, but Low Ki was named the number one contender to his title following the match. Ki ended up signing with the WWE and leaving PWG before he could challenge Hero for the title.

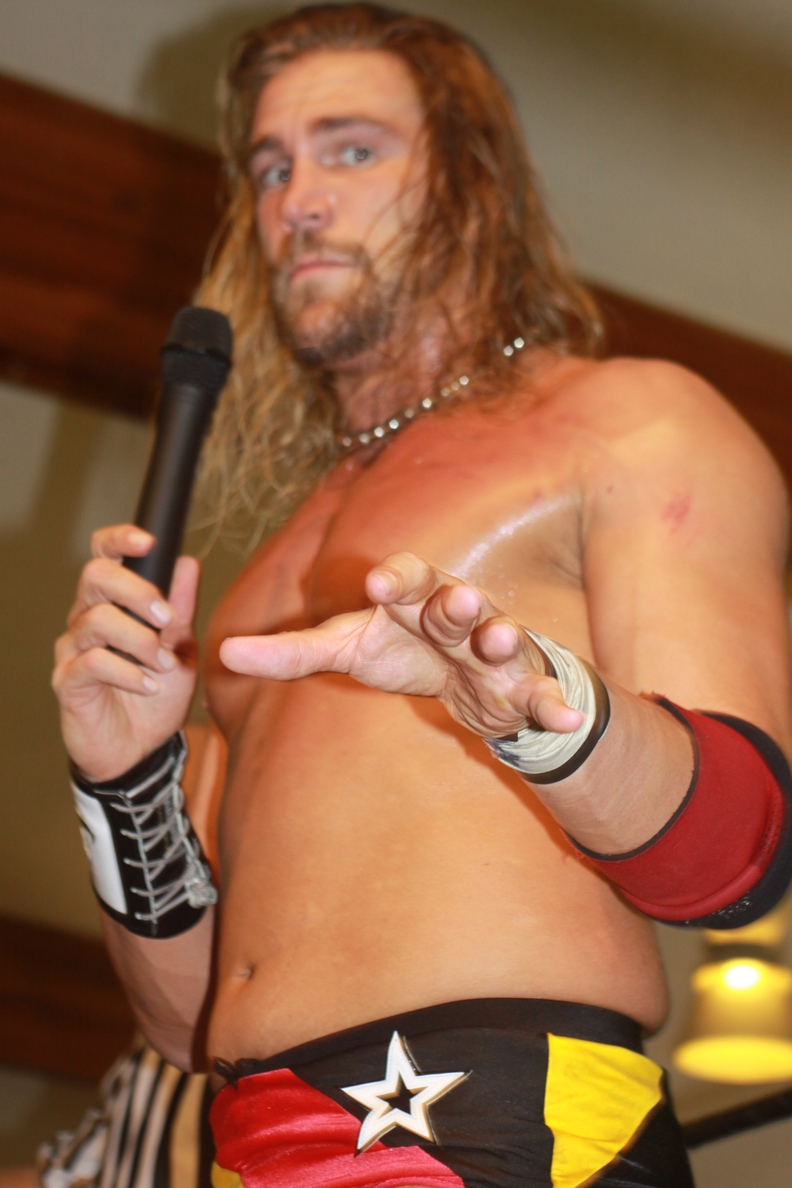
Hero in 2009

Hero went on to successfully defend the title in a three-way match against Human Tornado and the returning Colt Cabana on February 21, 2009, at Express Written Consent and on April 12 at One Hundred he defeated Cabana in a singles match. On May 22, 2009, at Dynamite Duumvirate Tag Team Title Tournament, Hero defeated Joey Ryan to retain the PWG World Championship. After the match Ryan was holding the belt and offered Hero a handshake, but then out of nowhere he knocked him out with it and said "I got three more months bitch!" (referring to Ryan being the longest reigning PWG champ of all time) and left. On July 31 at Threemendous II, Hero defeated Ryan in a Guerrilla Warfare match to ensure that on August 17 he became the longest reigning PWG Champion of all time. On September 4, 2009, at Guerre Sans Frontières Bryan Danielson defeated Hero to end his reign at 425 days.

Following the loss of his title, Hero decided to return to his former moveset in order to regain it, and defeated El Generico on October 2 at Against the Grain with a Hero's Welcome, instead of using his various elbow strikes. As Danielson was forced to vacate the World Championship, due to signing with World Wrestling Entertainment, the 2009 Battle of Los Angeles had the World Championship at stake. Hero opted to use his rematch clause after the tournament had concluded but at Seven on July 30, 2010, was defeated by defending champion Davey Richards. On September 4, Hero entered the 2010 Battle of Los Angeles, defeating Christopher Daniels in his first-round match. The following night Hero defeated Akira Tozawa and Brandon Gatson to make it to the finals, where he was defeated by Joey Ryan. After the tournament Hero was granted another shot at the PWG World Championship, when he and the three other Battle of Los Angeles semifinalists, Brandon Gatson, Claudio Castagnoli and Joey Ryan, were placed in a four-way match to determine a new champion, after Davey Richards had been stripped of the title. However, on October 9, 2010, at The Curse of Guerrilla Island, Hero's long time tag team partner Claudio Castagnoli defeated him for the PWG World Championship. At the following event on December 11, 2010, Hero and Castagnoli unsuccessfully challenged ¡Peligro Abejas! (El Generico and Paul London) for the PWG World Tag Team Championship. On March 4, 2011, Hero and Castagnoli entered the 2011 DDT 4 tournament, defeating the Cutler Brothers (Brandon and Dustin Cutler) in their first-round match. However, in the semifinals of the tournament, the Kings of Wrestling suffered an upset loss against the Nightmare Violence Connection (Akira Tozawa and Kevin Steen), when Tozawa rolled Hero up for the win. On May 27, during the first night of All Star Weekend 8, Hero unsuccessfully challenged Castagnoli for the PWG World Championship. Hero received another shot at the PWG World Championship on July 23 at PWG's eighth anniversary show, but was again defeated by Castagnoli. On August 20, after both Hero and Castagnoli were eliminated from the 2011 Battle of Los Angeles in the first round, they challenged PWG World Tag Team Champions, the Young Bucks (Matt and Nick Jackson), to a match for the title. The match, which took place later that same evening, saw the Kings of Wrestling once again fail to win the PWG World Tag Team Championship. Hero made an unadvertised return to PWG four months later on December 10, 2011, losing to Willie Mack, and afterwards held a farewell speech to the fans in attendance.

=== Ring of Honor (2005–2012) ===
==== CZW invasion (2005–2006) ====
During a large portion of 2006, Hero feuded with the entire Ring of Honor promotion, which began when he issued a challenge to ROH at CZW's Cage of Death 7 in December 2005. Hero began by challenging Bryan Danielson for the ROH World Championship on January 14 at Hell Freezes Over, but could not win the title. He, along with Necro Butcher, had been attending various Ring of Honor events, which usually involved them getting kicked out after harassing of Ring of Honor wrestlers in the middle of a match. During the feud Hero portrayed a villain in ROH, while still a fan favorite in CZW. On February 25 Hero, Necro Butcher, and the CZW locker room invaded ROH's Fourth Anniversary Show, before being chased away by Samoa Joe and the ROH locker room. The feud came to a head on March 11, when both promotions were in the same place, to co-promote an evening during which ROH held Arena Warfare and CZW When 2 Worlds Collide. Although Hero was not in attendance at Arena Warfare, CZW came out on top, after the CZW locker room took on Samoa Joe and B. J. Whitmer following their own match. This resulted in an all out brawl between the Ring of Honor locker room and the Combat Zone locker room, and the Combat Zone roster proceeded to destroy the ring ROH had set up, and chase Ring of Honor out of "their house". Hero and Necro Butcher came to ROH's Best in the World event in New York City on March 25 to answer a challenge made by Adam Pearce, but instead attacked him. Hero's long time tag partner and pupil Claudio Castagnoli turned on both Necro and Hero by saving Pearce.

The next weekend, Hero and Necro again caused a disruption during the ROH shows. They attacked ROH Commissioner Jim Cornette as well as Whitmer and Pearce. They also finally got the attention of Joe, who personally declared war on CZW. On April 22, ROH's 100th show in Philadelphia featured a battle between Team ROH (Joe, Whitmer and Pearce) and Team CZW (Hero, Necro and Super Dragon). The team of Hero, Necro Butcher, and Super Dragon went on to win the ROH vs. CZW main event, after Castagnoli revealed his allegiance to Hero and CZW by first attacking Samoa Joe and then helping Hero pin Pearce for the win. On July 15 at ROH's Death Before Dishonor IV Hero led Team CZW into the Cage of Death for a five-on-five main event against Team ROH. Hero had teased that he had made a deal with a mystery fifth man, who turned out to be Hero's hated rival Eddie Kingston. Although ROH's surprise fifth man Bryan Danielson turned on Samoa Joe in an effort to incapacitate Joe before their title match, Team ROH finally put CZW away when Homicide arrived in the Cage and pinned Nate Webb for the win. The following day on their Newswire, ROH stated that the war with CZW was over, thanks to Homicide.

Despite being forced out of ROH, Hero invaded the promotion's first two shows in the United Kingdom in August and was defeated by Colt Cabana in a singles match and Cabana, Nigel McGuinness and Robbie Brookside in a six-man tag team match where he teamed with Castagnoli and Chad Collyer. In August 2006, the Ring of Honor Tag Team Title belts were stolen from champions Austin Aries and Roderick Strong. Hero revealed on his LiveJournal that he and Castagnoli were the culprits and would be challenging for the title on September 16. They defeated Aries and Strong at Glory By Honor V Night 2 to become the Ring of Honor tag team champions. ROH then announced that by winning the belts, Hero had been made a full-time ROH wrestler. After it was announced that Castagnoli had signed a developmental deal with the WWE, the Kings of Wrestling lost the belts to Christopher Daniels and Matt Sydal on November 25 at Dethroned.

==== Sweet N' Sour Inc. (2006–2009) ====
On December 22 at International Challenge Larry Sweeney made his ROH debut and assisted Hero and Castagnoli defeat the Briscoe Brothers. The following night in Manhattan at Final Battle 2006 the Kings of Wrestling had their final match together when they, with Larry Sweeney in their corner, were defeated by the Briscoe Brothers in a rematch. After the match, Castagnoli announced that he was no longer going to World Wrestling Entertainment, and would remain in ROH as one half of the Kings of Wrestling. Sweeney then said he and Chris Hero had big plans for 2007, but Castagnoli was not included in them. Then, when Hero was forced to choose between staying with Castagnoli or going with Sweeney, he shook Castagnoli's hand but left with Sweeney.

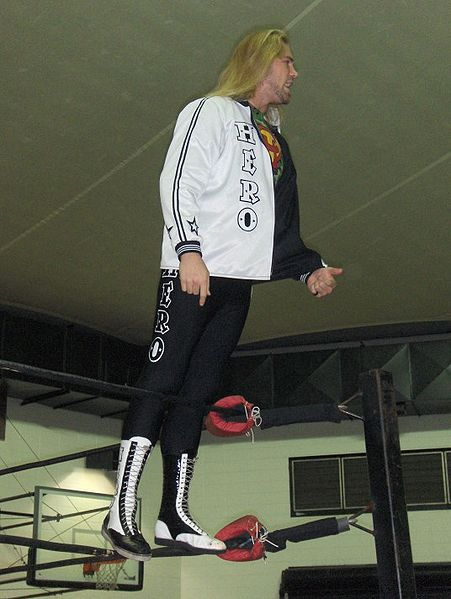
Hero making his ring entrance in 2008

Hero found relative success in singles competition, with notable feuds including Nigel McGuinness and the Briscoe Brothers. Hero was described by Sweeney as "the best athlete in Ring of Honor today", and was the most high-profile member of Sweet 'N' Sour Incorporated, Sweeney's stable that included Hero, Tank Toland, Bobby Dempsey and Sara Del Rey, with whom he held the unofficial Intergender World Tag Team Championship. He had challenged for the ROH World Title in a losing effort against then champion Homicide, and briefly reformed the Kings of Wrestling in another losing attempt at winning the ROH World Tag Team Championship.

At Survival of the Fittest 2007, Hero single-handedly eliminated Austin Aries, Roderick Strong, Claudio Castagnoli, Rocky Romero and Human Tornado to win the 2007 Survival of the Fittest tournament. As his prize, Hero was granted a shot at the ROH Heavyweight Championship at a time of his choosing. He chose to challenge the reigning champion, Nigel McGuinness, at Glory by Honor VI: Night One. Despite a badly torn biceps sustained a week prior, McGuinness accepted the challenge. Hero managed to force McGuinness to tap out, but the match was restarted after the referee noticed that McGuinness had reached the ropes. After the restart McGuinness made Hero tap out and retained his title in controversial fashion. On June 27, 2008, Hero pinned FIP World Champion Roderick Strong in a non-title bout with an assist from Sweeney. On June 28, 2008, Hero's winning streak continued when he defeated Pelle Primeau in a Light's Out Match with an assist from Larry Sweeney and Sara Del Rey, despite interference from former Sweet N'Sour Inc. teammate and later turn coat Brent Albright. On July 26, 2008, Hero and fellow Sweet N'Sour Inc. teammate Go Shiozaki were defeated by Roderick Strong and Naomichi Marufuji when Strong pinned Hero with a big boot/cradle backbreaker combination.

During late 2008 Hero began wearing a more traditional wrestling attire and adopted a new finishing maneuver in the Rolling Elbow, while being dubbed "That Young Knockout Kid" by his manager Larry Sweeney, who ended up leaving the company in April 2009. After returning from a tour of Pro Wrestling Noah in early 2009, Hero began using a weighted elbow pad, which he claimed to have been given as a gift from Mitsuharu Misawa, to knock out his opponents and win matches. On May 8, 2009, Hero was defeated by the ROH World Champion Jerry Lynn in a match for the title. On July 25, 2009, in Toronto, Canada, Hero scored what could be considered the biggest win of his career when he pinned Lance Storm in a grudge match that was one year in the making. During much of 2009, Hero rekindled an old feud with Eddie Kingston, whom he defeated in a singles match on September 26 at Glory By Honor VIII: The Final Countdown. On December 19, 2009, at Final Battle 2009, ROH's first live pay-per-view, Kingston defeated Hero in a Fight Without Honor.

==== Kings of Wrestling reunion (2009–2012) ====
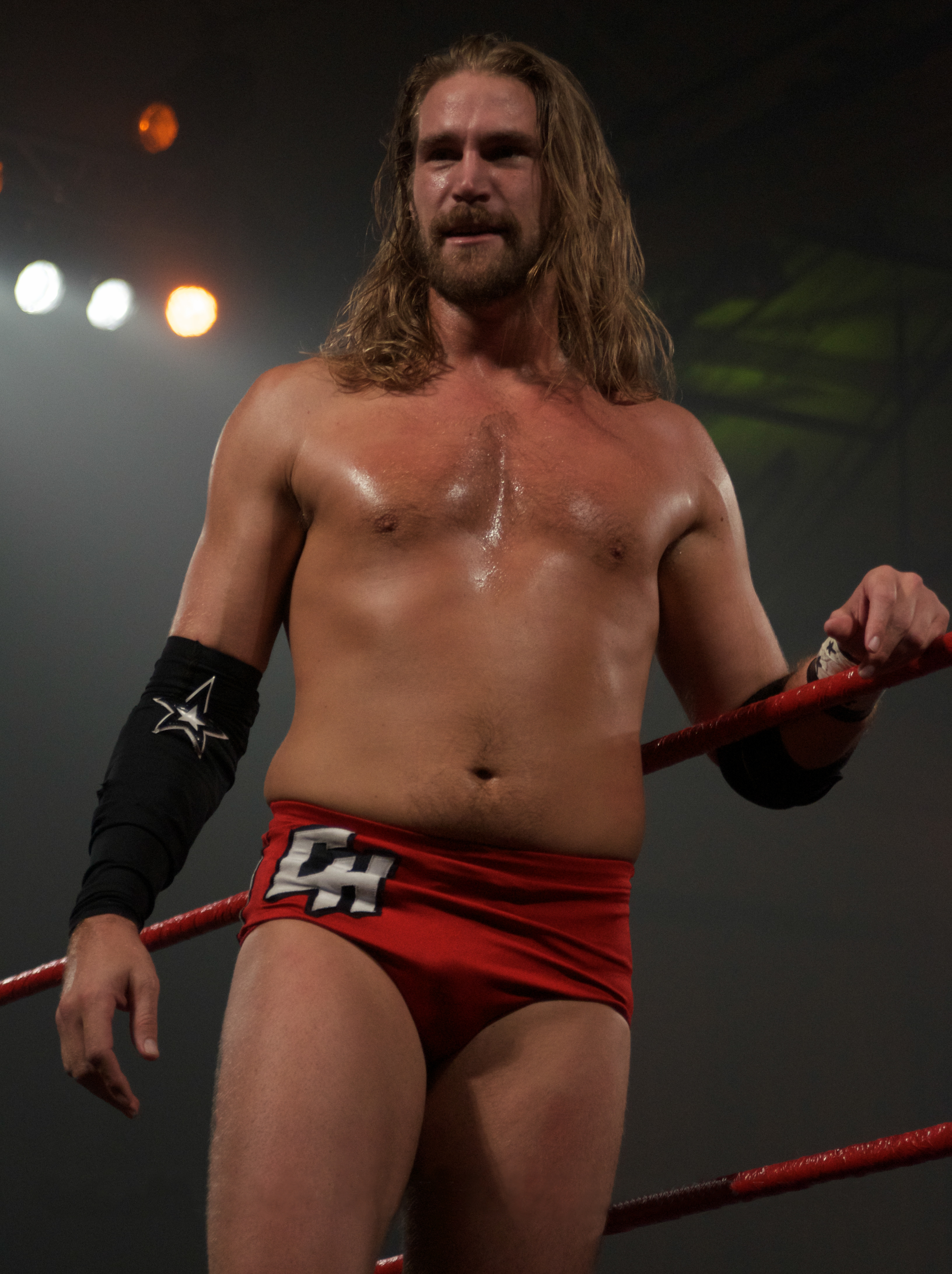
Hero in August 2011

Towards the end of Final Battle 2009, after the Briscoe Brothers had defeated The American Wolves (Davey Richards and Eddie Edwards) for the ROH World Tag Team Championship, Hero reunited with his Kings of Wrestling partner Claudio Castagnoli. Together they attacked the new champions and then posed with the Tag Team Championship belts. The two would adopt Shane Hagadorn as their manager and Sara Del Rey as an associate. On April 3, 2010, at The Big Bang! Hero and Castagnoli defeated the Briscoes to win the ROH World Tag Team Championship for the second time. At the following pay-per-view, Death Before Dishonor VIII, on June 19 Hero and Castagnoli successfully defended their title against the Briscoes in a No Disqualification match. In July Ring of Honor announced the return of Tag Wars, where twelve tag teams would compete in three blocks to determine, which three would get to challenge the Kings of Wrestling in the final Ultimate Endurance match. On August 28 the Kings of Wrestling defeated The Dark City Fight Club (Jon Davis and Kory Chavis), The All Night Express (Kenny King and Rhett Titus) and the Briscoes in the Ultimate Endurance match to win the 2010 Tag Wars and retain the ROH World Tag Team Championship. On September 2 it was announced that Hero had signed a contract extension with Ring of Honor. On December 18 at Final Battle 2010 the Kings of Wrestling ended their feud with the Briscoe Brothers in a six-man tag team match, where Jay, Mark and their father Mike defeated Hero, Castagnoli and Shane Hagadorn.

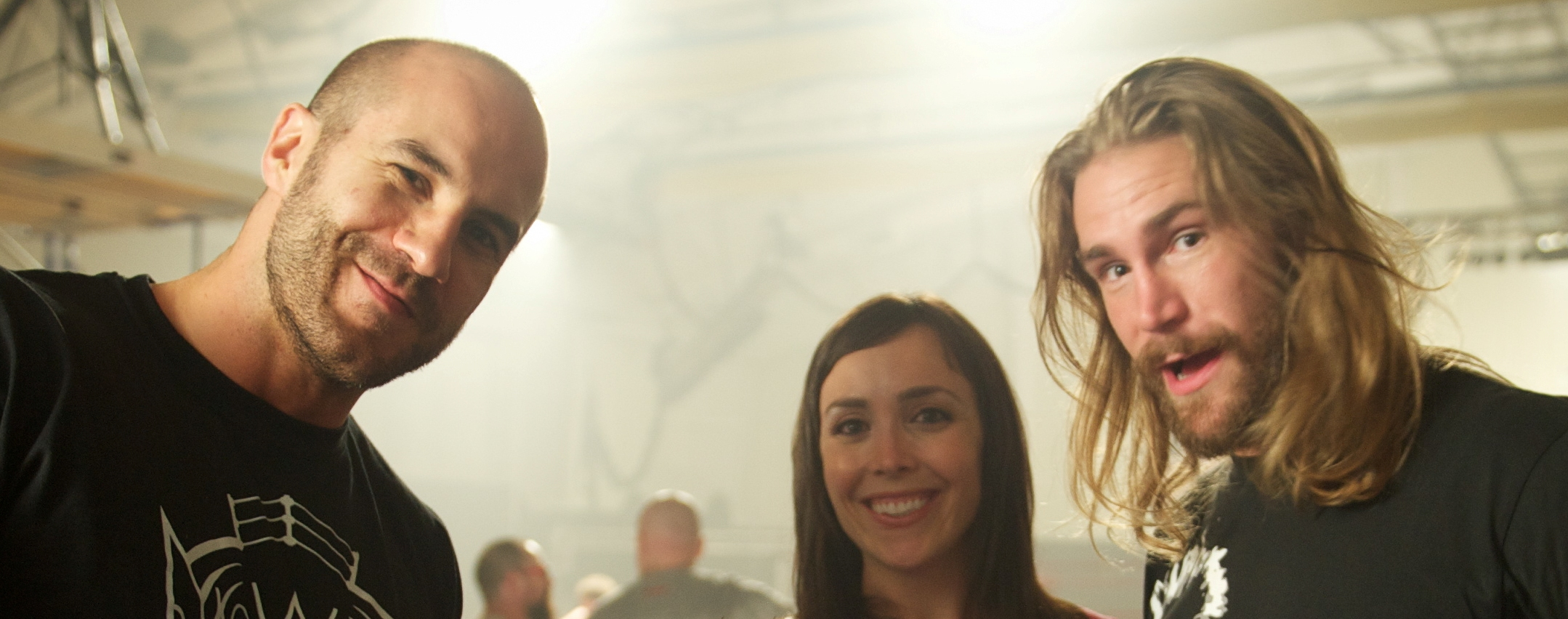
(Left to right) Claudio Castagnoli, Sara Del Rey and Chris Hero as the Kings of Wrestling in August 2012

On January 4, 2011 Hero and Castagnoli became the longest reigning ROH World Tag Team Champions by breaking the previous record of 275 days, set by the Briscoe Brothers. Although they had ended their feud with the Briscoes, they had already begun another. At the September 11, 2010 pay-per-view Glory By Honor IX, the Kings of Wrestling picked up a major victory by defeating Wrestling's Greatest Tag Team (Charlie Haas and Shelton Benjamin) in a non–title match on the team's debut with the promotion. However, on January 28, 2011, Wrestling's Greatest Tag Team took a return win in a non-title match at SoCal Showdown II. On February 26 at 9th Anniversary Show, Hero and Castagnoli successfully defended the ROH World Tag Team Championship against The All Night Express. On April 1 at Honor Takes Center Stage, the Kings of Wrestling lost the ROH World Tag Team Championship to Charlie Haas and Shelton Benjamin, ending their reign at 363 days. On May 7 at Revolution Canada Hero unsuccessfully challenged ROH World Champion Eddie Edwards for his title, losing to him via referee stoppage. The Kings of Wrestling received their rematch for the ROH World Tag Team Championship on August 13 at the first Ring of Honor Wrestling tapings under the Sinclair Broadcast Group banner, but were unable to regain the belts from Haas and Benjamin. This would mark the team's final ROH appearance as the following month it was reported that Castagnoli had signed a contract with WWE.

On December 23, 2011 at Final Battle, Hero returned to ROH to accept the Roderick Strong Invitational Challenge, losing to Strong after interference from his manager, Truth Martini. He made one more appearance with the company, at their January 20, 2012 Homecoming event in Philadelphia. There, he faced Strong's ally Michael Elgin, but was again defeated.

=== International promotions (2007–2016) ===
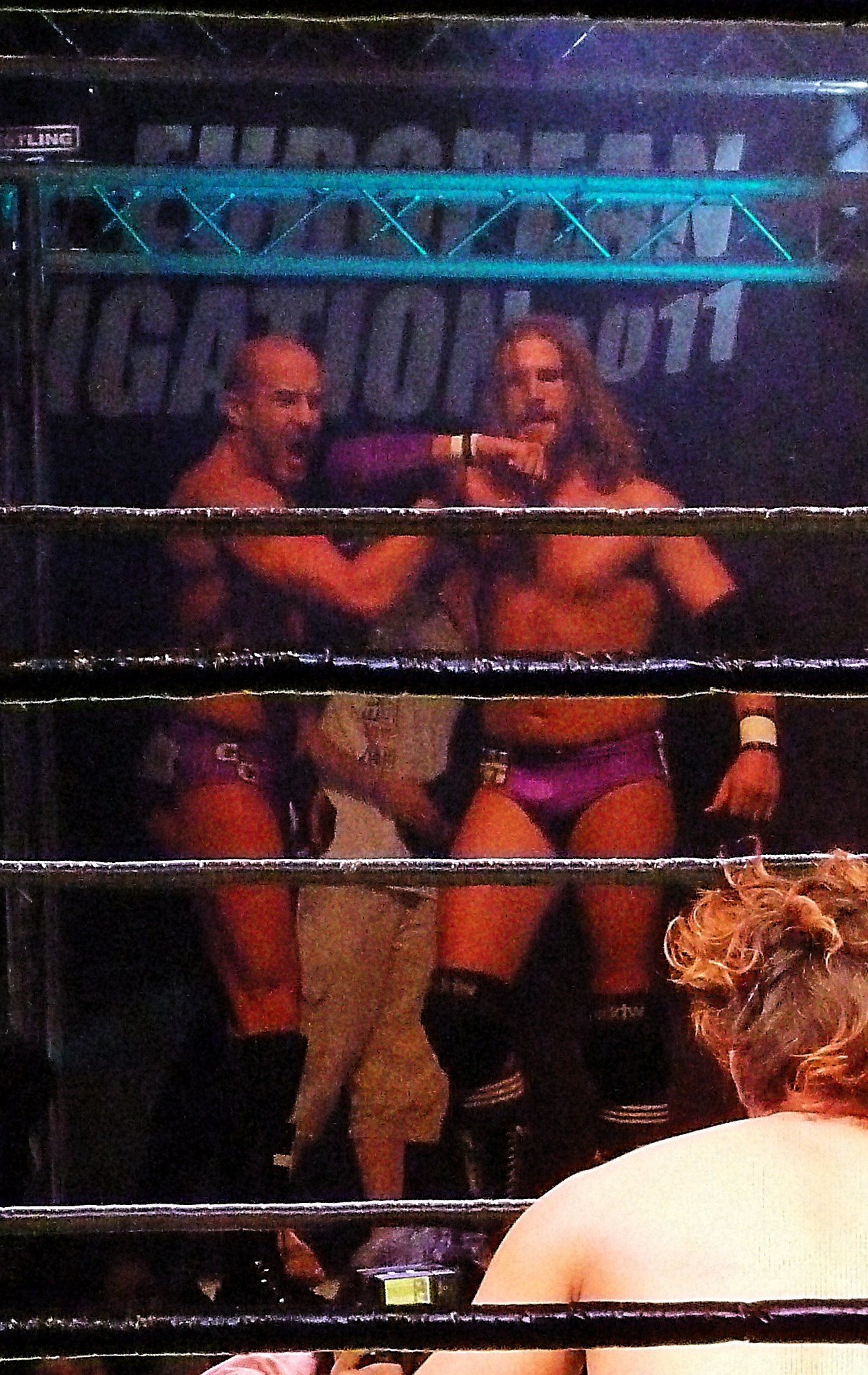
Hero (right) with Claudio Castagnoli as the Kings of Wrestling on Pro Wrestling Noah's European Navigation tour in 2011.

Hero became a regular for several European wrestling promotions, most notable being the Westside Xtreme Wrestling (wXw) federation based in Essen, Germany. He has wrestled in sixteen different countries across the world: Australia, Austria, Belgium, Canada, England, France, Germany, Italy, Japan, Mexico, the Netherlands, Peru, Scotland, Spain, Switzerland and the United States.

In April 2007, Hero competed in the first King of Europe Cup, as the representative of CZW. He defeated Claudio Castagnoli in the first round before being defeated by Doug Williams in the quarterfinals. On May 6, 2007, Hero won wXw's prestigious international competition event, the "16 Carat Gold Tournament", defeating Ares in the finals.

Hero also returned to Australia to wrestle for the PWA Queensland promotion, competing in their annual "Rise of the Warriors" tournament, in which he also competed in 2007. Hero made it all the way to the final of the tournament, which lasted two nights, losing to PWA Queensland regular, Esteban Molina. Along the way, he defeated Mason Childs, whom he lost to in the final of the 2007 tournament, Mark Davis, and Blakestone to get to the finals. The previous year, he defeated Kyote, Damian Slater, and Ryan Eagles to advance to the finals.

In January 2009, Hero returned to Japan for Pro Wrestling Noah. He came to an agreement with the Noah front office and was granted a stay at the dojo after the tour. He trained alongside Richie Steamboat and made his way back to the U.S. after five weeks abroad. Hero returned to Noah for the June 2009 tour and stayed, once again, at the dojo. During this stay, Hero wrestled at the event where one of his idols, Mitsuharu Misawa, died during the main event match. In January 2010 Hero and Claudio Castagnoli entered the Global Tag League, but ended up losing all three of their matches. Hero and Castagnoli returned to Noah on November 19, 2010, for a three-week-long tour. The team went undefeated in tag team matches, before being defeated on December 5, the final day of the tour, by Takuma Sano and Yoshihiro Takayama in a match for the GHC Tag Team Championship. The Kings of Wrestling returned to Noah in April 2011 to take part in the 2011 Global Tag League, where they managed to win two out of their seven-round robin matches, finishing seventh out of eight teams in the block.

On March 13, 2010, Hero made his debut for the American promotion Evolve at Evolve 2: Hero vs. Hidaka, losing to Ikuto Hidaka in the main event of the evening. In October 2011, Spradlin took part in the first season tapings of Wrestling Retribution Project, where he performed as Chris Hyde.

On April 12, 2014, Hero returned to Japan and Pro Wrestling Noah to take part in the 2014 Global Tag League, where he teamed with Colt Cabana under the team name "Big in U.S.A.". The team finished the tournament with a record of two wins and four losses, finishing last in the block. They were, however, given the Technique Award for their effort in the tournament. From October 18 to November 8, Hero took part in Noah's 2014 Global League, where he finished with a record of four wins and three losses, failing to advance from his block. Hero returned to Noah in April 2015, when he and Cabana took part in the 2015 Global Tag League, where they finished with a record of three wins and two losses, finishing tied second in their block and missing the finals. During the tournament, Hero and Cabana most notably scored a win over reigning GHC and NWA World Tag Team Champions K.E.S. (Davey Boy Smith Jr. and Lance Archer). As a result, Hero and Cabana received a shot at the GHC Tag Team Championship on June 19, but were defeated by K.E.S.

In June 2015, Hero wrestled for the Canadian Smash Wrestling as part of a fundraiser for research against ALS called an Infinity Gauntlet, where the duration would be set by the level of donations and he would be wrestling the entire time. Hero wrestled for over three hours, raising $3440 for ALS.

From October 16 to November 6, Hero took part in Pro Wrestling Noah's 2015 Global League, where he finished with a record of four wins and three losses. Hero entered the final day with a chance to advance to the finals, but was eliminated after losing to Naomichi Marufuji in the main event.

Hero debuted for Progress Wrestling in the UK in May 2016 at their annual Super Strong Style 16 tournament. He won against Mark Andrews in the first round and Big Daddy Walter in the quarter finals before losing to Tommy End in the semi-finals. At Chapter 31, he had a thirty-minute match with then-Progress Champion Marty Scurll for the title but did not win. At the 2018 Super Strong Style 16 tournament, Hero, billed as Kassius Ohno, won against Chris Brookes in the 1st round before being eliminated by Tyler Bate in the quarter finals. As Bate was injured during his previous match with Ohno, an impromptu Semi-final Qualifier match occurred between Ohno, Roy "Big Wavy" Johnson, Chuck Mambo, Chris Brookes, Jordan Devlin, Angélico & David Starr. Ohno won, earning a place in the Semi-final match against Zack Gibson, which he won. Ohno was defeated in the final by Zack Sabre Jr.

=== WWE (2011–2013) ===
==== Florida Championship Wrestling (2011–2012) ====
In June 2011, both Spradlin and Claudio Castagnoli had a private tryout with WWE. While Castagnoli was instantly signed to a developmental contract, Spradlin's contract was delayed when elevated testosterone/epitestosterone level caused him to fail a drug test for steroids. Eventually, Spradlin signed a contract in February 2012 and was assigned to WWE's developmental territory, Florida Championship Wrestling (FCW). On February 16, FCW introduced Spradlin under the new ring name Kassius Ohno. He later revealed that he had come up with the name himself, wanting to have the initials "K.O."; Ohno was taken from Apolo Ohno. Spradlin made his debut as Ohno at an FCW house show that same evening, losing to Xavier Woods. Ohno made his FCW television debut on March 11, when he introduced himself in a promo. His in-ring debut took place the following week, when he defeated Xavier Woods. On the April 29 episode of FCW, Ohno unsuccessfully challenged Seth Rollins for the FCW Florida Heavyweight Championship.

==== NXT (2012–2013) ====
When WWE rebranded its developmental territory FCW into NXT, Ohno debuted on the July 4 episode of the rebooted NXT, where he defeated Mike Dalton, while taking on a gimmick of a methodical wrestler who takes pleasure from inflicting pain and knocking out opponents. Ohno started a feud with Richie Steamboat in September; Steamboat defeated Ohno twice (via disqualification and a cradle), but Ohno conducted successful post-match assaults on Steamboat. Ohno then injured and pinned Steamboat during a six-man tag match while teaming with the Ascension against Steamboat and The Usos on the October 17 NXT, but Steamboat still managed to cost Ohno a match against Trent Barreta a week later. Ohno defeated Barreta in a rematch on the November 7 NXT. After Leo Kruger attacked Baretta before he could face Ohno again on the November 21 NXT, Steamboat returned from injury and decisively pinned Ohno to end the feud. Ohno then formed an alliance with Kruger and also started a feud with William Regal after Regal saved Tyson Kidd from a beatdown by Ohno and Kruger on the December 5 NXT. Ohno and Kruger defeated Kidd and Justin Gabriel on the January 2, 2013 NXT. On the January 30 NXT, Ohno and Kruger entered the NXT Tag Team Championship Tournament to crown the inaugural champions and defeated Alex Riley and Derrick Bateman in the first round. On the February 6 NXT, Ohno and Kruger were defeated by Adrian Neville and Oliver Grey in the semi-finals when Ohno was distracted with taunting Regal. When Regal saved Derrick Bateman from Ohno's post-match attack on the March 13 NXT, Ohno confronted Regal only to be assaulted by him. The following week, Regal apologized to Ohno and in reply, Ohno stated that he had followed in Regal's footsteps to arrive in WWE, but that Regal's whole career had no legacy, leading to Regal again assaulting Ohno. In the following weeks, Ohno and Regal went on to attack each other while the other person was at commentary. The rivalry between Ohno and Regal culminated in a match on the April 11 NXT, which Regal won.

On the May 8 NXT, Ohno turned face by apologizing to Regal, after which, he was attacked by the Wyatt Family. On the May 29 episode of NXT, Ohno competed in an 18-man battle royal to determine the number one contender to the NXT Championship, where he and Corey Graves were eliminated by Bray Wyatt. The following week Ohno and Graves teamed up to take on Luke Harper and Erick Rowan for the NXT Tag Team Championship but were defeated after Wyatt interfered. On the June 19 NXT, Ohno, Graves, and Adrian Neville were defeated by the Wyatt Family in a six-man tag team match. On the June 26 NXT, Graves and Ohno defeated Garrett Dylan and Scott Dawson to become number one contenders for the tag title, but were later attacked by the Wyatt Family as well as Dylan and Dawson. This attack led to Ohno suffering a storyline injury while he was pulled from NXT television tapings, reportedly due to his lack of commitment to physical conditioning programs. Ohno returned to in-ring action on the October 2 NXT, losing to Luke Harper.

On November 8, 2013, Ohno was released from WWE ending his first stint in the company. After his release, he said that he had enjoyed the last 21 months and intended to continue with his independent career, including international dates in Europe and Japan. The split was reportedly on "good terms", with Ohno saying that the door was open to a future with the WWE. He would go on to say, "In my exit interview, they said we would take a little while and revisit later on and see if things change".

=== Return to the independent circuit (2013–2017) ===
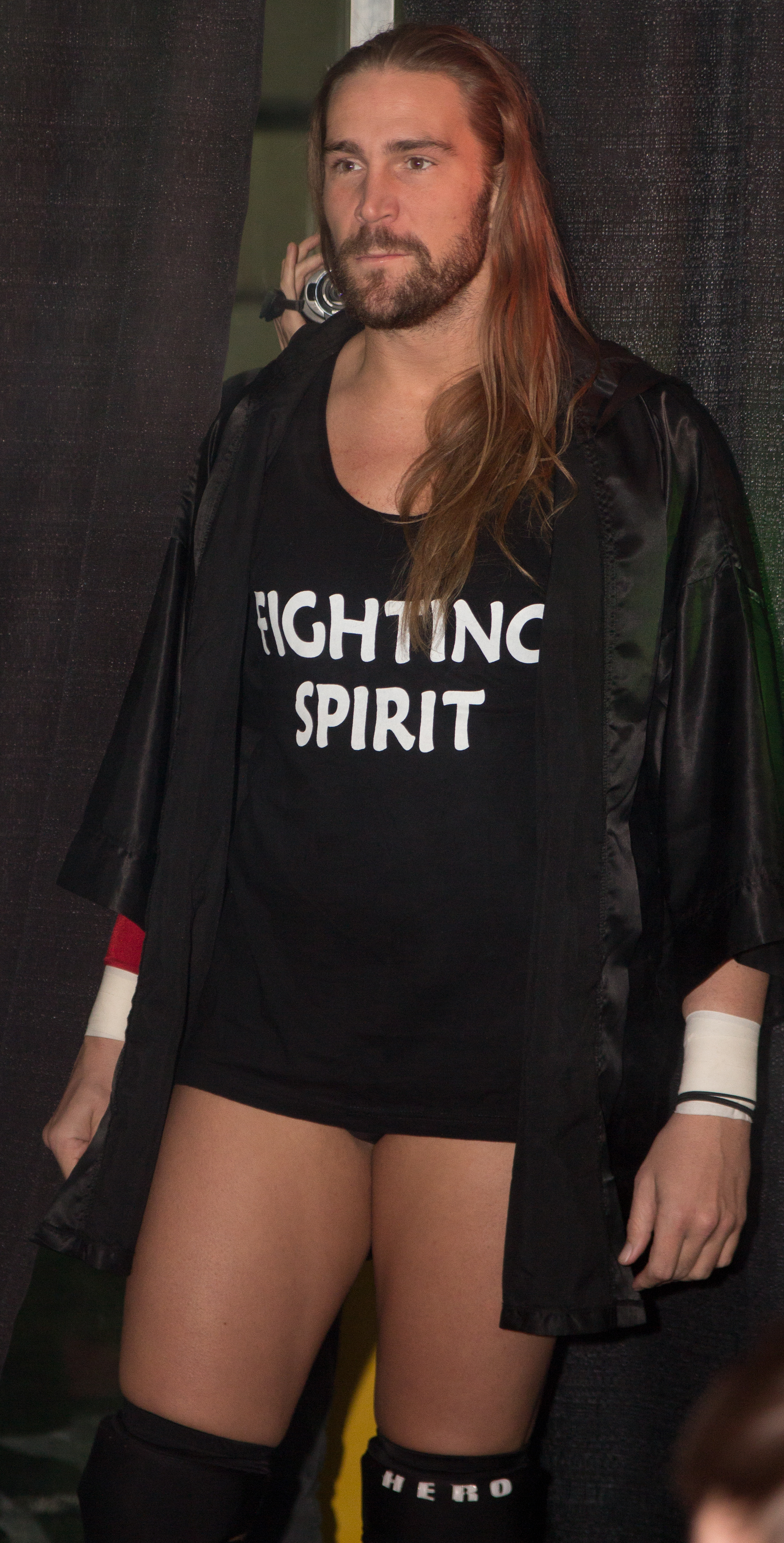
Hero at a Smash Wrestling event in 2013

On November 16, 2013, Spradlin returned to working on the independent circuit under his Chris Hero ring name, defeating Shane Helms at a Pro Wrestling Syndicate event. The following day he made his debut for Dragon Gate USA, unsuccessfully challenging Johnny Gargano for the Open the Freedom Gate Championship. On November 30, Hero made his debut for NWA territory Florida Underground Wrestling, defeating Jesus De Leon. On December 15, Hero defeated Lance Storm in his Smash Wrestling debut. On December 27, Hero made an appearance for Absolute Intense Wrestling (AIW), losing to Tim Donst in a singles match. On January 10, 2014, Hero returned to Evolve, losing to Ricochet in a singles match. On February 23, Hero defeated A. R. Fox to win the Evolve Championship. On March 16, 2014, Hero became the first two-time winner of wXw's 16 Carat Gold tournament, defeating Axel Tischer in the finals of the three-day-long tournament. On June 6, 2014, Hero made his debut at Tommy Dreamer's House of Hardcore. Hero was defeated by A.J. Styles.

On June 13, 2014, Hero defeated Jeckles the Jester in San Francisco, CA Near the Historic Cow Palace to win the All Pro Wrestling World Wide Internet Championship. On August 8, Hero lost the Evolve Championship to Drew Galloway. In June 2015, Hero wrestled for three consecutive hours against 17 opponents in a fundraiser for ALS. After re-signing with WWE, Hero wrestled his final independent match on January 28, 2017, losing to Zack Sabre Jr. at Evolve 77.

=== Ring of Honor (2013–2014) ===
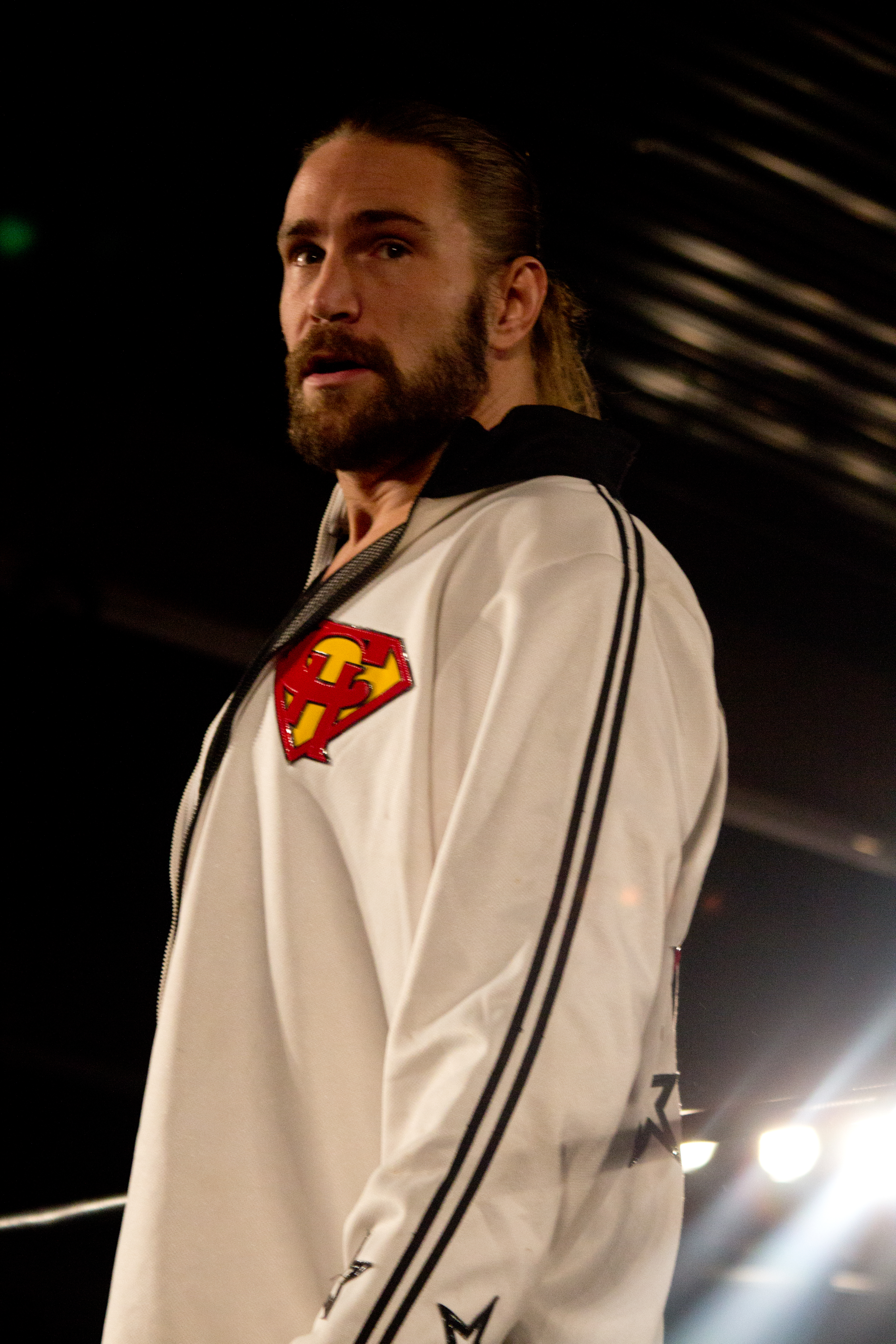
Hero at a Ring of Honor event in January 2014

On December 14, 2013, Hero also returned to ROH, attacking ROH World Champion Adam Cole and Matt Hardy at the end of Final Battle 2013. On January 4, 2014, Hero was defeated by Kevin Steen in his ROH return match. On February 21 at the 12th Anniversary Show, Hero unsuccessfully challenged Cole for the ROH World Championship. A rematch between the two, contested under Ringmaster's Challenge rules, took place on March 8 and saw Cole again retain the title. Hero's last match in ROH was on March 22 in Dayton, Ohio, at the Flyin' High event, where he was submitted by A.J. Styles.

=== Return to PWG (2013–2016) ===
Hero returned to PWG at the first night of the All Star Weekend X on December 20, 2013, unsuccessfully challenging Adam Cole for the PWG World Championship. In August 2014, Hero then entered the Battle of Los Angeles for the first time since 2011, but was eliminated in the first round by a returning Matt Sydal. In the following year's tournament, Hero made it all the way to the finals before being submitted by Zack Sabre Jr. in a three-way elimination match also involving Mike Bailey. Ohno left PWG in December 2016 after signing again with WWE. His farewell match in PWG took place at Mystery Vortex IV, where Hero and JT Dunn, billed as Death By Elbow, lost to reDRagon (Bobby Fish and Kyle O'Reilly).

=== Return to WWE (2016–2020) ===
==== NXT (2016–2019) ====
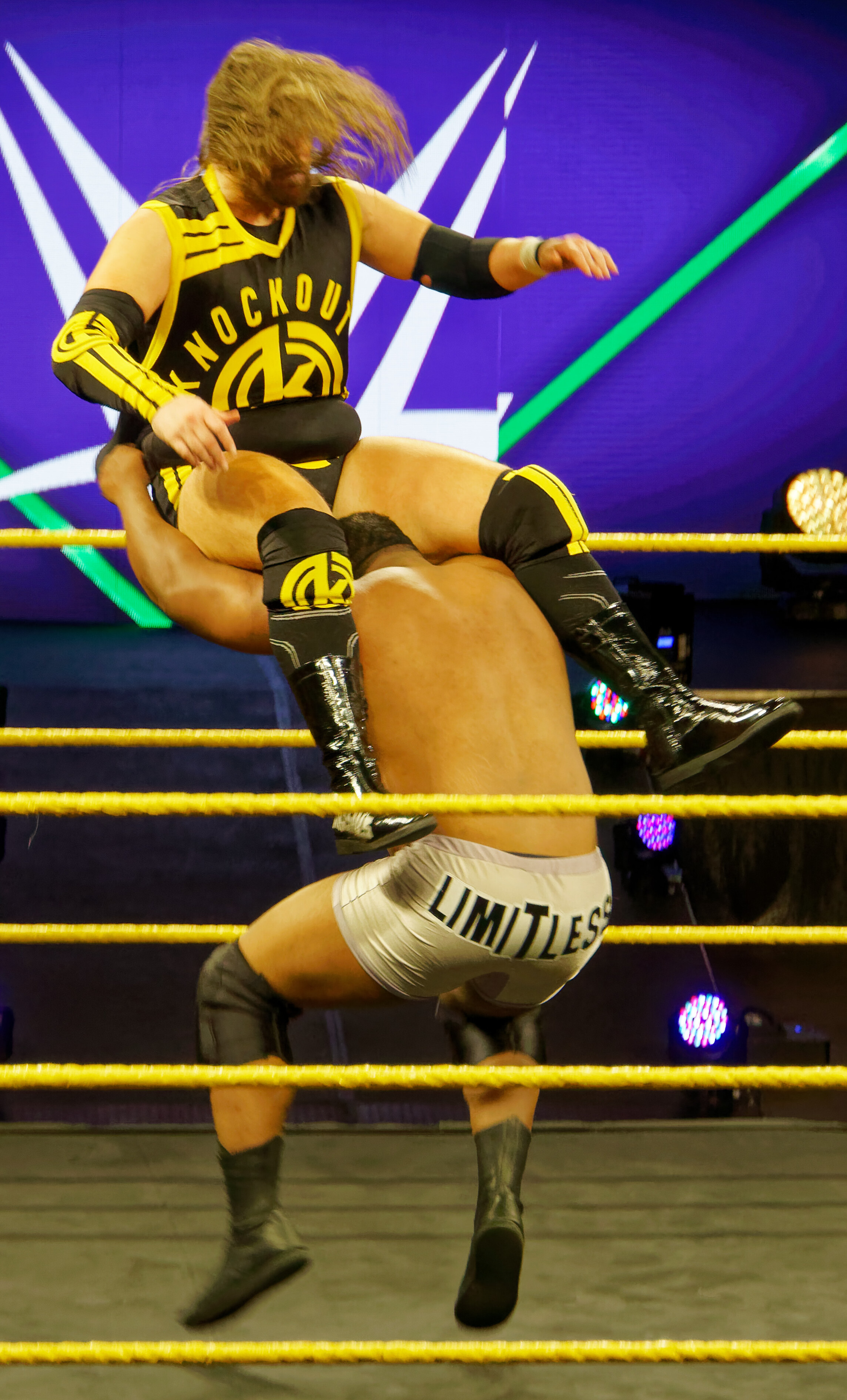
Ohno receiving a powerbomb from Keith Lee in April 2018

In December 2016, it was reported that Spradlin had re-signed with WWE. Spradlin, once again billed as Kassius Ohno, made his return at the January 5, 2017 NXT tapings, confronting then NXT Champion Shinsuke Nakamura at the end of the live show. The following day, Ohno defeated Andrade "Cien" Almas at a NXT house show in his return match. Ohno returned to NXT television on February 22, 2017, saving No Way Jose and confronting Bobby Roode. On the March 15 episode of NXT, Ohno faced Roode for the NXT Championship in a losing effort. On the March 29 episode of NXT, Ohno defeated Elias Samson in a Loser Leaves NXT match. Ohno made his NXT TakeOver debut at NXT TakeOver: Orlando in an eight-person tag team match, teaming with Tye Dillinger, Roderick Strong, and Ruby Riott against SAnitY, replacing an injured No Way Jose, being on the losing side of the team.

In May 2017, Ohno entered a program with Hideo Itami after Itami began causing a scene in the locker room following his loss to then-NXT Champion Bobby Roode at NXT TakeOver: Chicago, during which Ohno tried to calm down Itami. Concerned with Itami's actions, Ohno saved Oney Lorcan from a post-match attack by Itami on the June 7 edition of NXT. After weeks of trying to help Itami, tensions became too high and Ohno and Itami faced off on the July 26 episode of NXT, where Ohno won after Itami got himself disqualified. The two concluded their feud on the September 6 episode of NXT, when Ohno defeated Itami in a No Disqualification match. On the November 8 episode of NXT, Ohno asked general manager William Regal for a match with the undefeated Lars Sullivan. At NXT TakeOver: WarGames, Ohno was defeated by Sullivan. On the January 24 episode of NXT Ohno had a backstage encounter with Velveteen Dream that ended with Ohno shoving Dream to the ground. This led to a match against Dream at NXT TakeOver: Philadelphia in January 2018 where Ohno lost.

Ohno was subsequently presented as a figurative "gatekeeper" in NXT while showing signs of a heel turn. At NXT TakeOver: WarGames, he was called out by Matt Riddle, who challenged him to an impromptu match, in which he lost in only eight seconds. At the December 5 edition of NXT, Ohno attacked Riddle after his match against the debuting Punishment Martinez, cementing his heel turn. At NXT TakeOver: Phoenix, Ohno faced Riddle in a rematch, which he lost. Following him "leaving" NXT, Ohno continued wrestling on NXT live events. On April 10, 2019, Ohno wrestled the recently signed Kushida, in his debut match for NXT.

With WWE's partnership with Evolve Wrestling, Hero was announced for Evolve 115, 116 and 118. At Evolve 115, he failed to defeat Fabian Aichner for the Evolve Championship.

==== NXT UK (2019–2020) ====
Following his loss to Matt Riddle at TakeOver, Ohno stated on NXT's weekly show that he would be leaving NXT. On February 22, 2019, Ohno debuted at WWE's United Kingdom brand NXT UK event in Coventry, UK. There it was announced that Ohno was now an active wrestler on NXT UK. The following night, February 23, he cut a promo at NXT UK Coventry, reading an apology off his phone for Ashton Smith. Later, he was defeated by Travis Banks. On March 20, 2019, Kassius Ohno defeated Ashton Smith. On April 16, 2020, Ohno's WWE.com profile was moved to the alumni section and was soon confirmed to be part of the releases that took place due to the COVID-19 pandemic. Ohno himself would further confirm this, as he took to Twitter where he posted a picture of his Kassius Ohno boots alone in the ring followed by a video confirming the return of Chris Hero.

=== All Elite Wrestling (2023–present) ===
On June 26, 2023, it was reported that Hero had begun working for All Elite Wrestling (AEW) as a coach. In July 2025, it was reported that Hero had officially signed with the promotion in a full-time role.

== Other media ==
Spradlin appeared on Australian program Border Security: Australia's Front Line in 2009, a weekly television documentary program that details real and potential immigration and custom infringements at airports and seaports across Australia. On December 18, 2008, Spradlin had entered Australia under a tourist visa, which does not permit participating in paid or unpaid performances, even though he was planning to perform, defending his PWG World Championship in the PWA Queensland wrestling show the next day. Spradlin cooperated with the immigration officials and after four hours was permitted to leave the airport and enter the country after the event organiser agreed to sponsor him on an entertainment visa, which was approved by immigration.

Spradlin also appeared in a music video for the song "The Ballad of Moose Bruce" by Indie band Born Ruffians. The video features Hero performing his signature moves the rolling elbow and moonsault in slow motion.

Spradlin, going by the ring name Chris Hero, appears on WWE Home Video's CM Punk – Best in the World DVD documentary, where he talks about competing against CM Punk during their independent circuit days.

Spradlin, as Kassius Ohno, made his WWE video game debut as a playable character in WWE 2K18, and subsequently appears in its sequels WWE 2K19 and WWE 2K20.

== Personal life ==
Spradlin is a fan of hip hop music and basketball, the latter of which has been the inspiration for much of his ring attire. He is engaged to fellow professional wrestler Rachael Ellering.

== Championships and accomplishments ==
- AAW: Professional Wrestling Redefined
  - Jim Lynam Memorial Tournament (2016)
- All Pro Wrestling
  - APW Worldwide Internet Championship (1 time)
- Alternative Championship Wrestling
  - ACW Heavyweight Championship (1 time)
- Chikara
  - Chikara Campeonatos de Parejas (1 time) – with Claudio Castagnoli
  - Tag World Grand Prix (2006) – with Claudio Castagnoli
- Combat Zone Wrestling
  - CZW Iron Man Championship (1 time)
  - CZW World Heavyweight Championship (1 time)
  - CZW World Tag Team Championship (2 times) – with Claudio Castagnoli
  - Last Team Standing (2006) – with Claudio Castagnoli
- Coliseum Championship Wrestling
  - CCW Heavyweight Championship (3 times)
  - CCW Tag Team Championship (1 time) – with John Caesar
- DDT Pro-Wrestling
  - Ironman Heavymetalweight Championship (1 time)
- Discovery Wrestling
  - Discovery Awards (1 time)
    - Match of the Year (2015) – vs. Joe Coffey at Live in Edinburgh
- Evolve
  - Evolve Championship (1 time)
- Grand Pro Wrestling
  - GPW Heavyweight Championship (1 time)
- Hard Core Wrestling
  - HCW Tag Team Championship (1 time) – with Danny Blackheart
- Impact Championship Wrestling
  - ICW Heavyweight Championship (1 time)
- Independent Wrestling Association Mid-South
  - IWA Mid-South Heavyweight Championship (4 times)
  - Strong Style Tournament (2005)
  - Sweet Science Sixteen (2000)
  - Ted Petty Invitational (2016)
- IWA East Coast
  - IWA East Coast Heavyweight Championship (2 times)
- Juggalo Championship Wrestling
  - JCW Tag Team Championship (1 time) – with Claudio Castagnoli
- NWA West Virginia / Ohio
  - NWA WV/OH Junior Heavyweight Championship (1 time)
- Northern States Wrestling Alliance
  - NSWA Heavyweight Championship (1 time)
- Pro Wrestling Guerrilla
  - PWG World Championship (1 time)
- Pro Wrestling Illustrated
  - PWI ranked him No. 36 of the 500 best singles wrestlers in the PWI 500 in 2011
- Pro Wrestling Noah
  - Global League Puroresu Kakutōgi DX Award (2014)
  - Global Tag League Outstanding Performance Award (2015) – with Colt Cabana
  - Global Tag League Technique Award (2014, 2015) – with Colt Cabana
- Ring of Honor
  - ROH World Tag Team Championship (2 times) – with Claudio Castagnoli
  - Survival of the Fittest (2007)
  - Tag Wars Tournament (2010) – with Claudio Castagnoli
  - Undisputed World Intergender Heavyweight Tag Team Championship (1 time) – with Sara Del Rey^{1}
- SoCal Uncensored Awards
  - Match of the Year (2008) vs. Low Ki at PWG 2008 Battle of Los Angeles – Stage Two, November 2, 2008
  - Match of the Year (2009) vs. Bryan Danielson at PWG Guerre Sans Frontières, September 4, 2009
- Unified Championship Wrestling
  - UCW Television Championship (1 time)
- Violent Championship Wrestling
  - VCW Triple Threat Championship (2 times)
  - VCW Tag Team Championship (2 times) – with Porno the Clown
- Westside Xtreme Wrestling
  - wXw World Heavyweight Championship (1 time)
  - wXw Tag Team Championship (1 time) – with Marc Roudin
  - 16 Carat Gold Tournament (2007, 2014)
- Wrestling Observer Newsletter
  - Tag Team of the Year (2010) with Claudio Castagnoli
- Xtreme Intense Championship Wrestling
  - XICW Heavyweight Championship (1 time)
- Other achievements
  - Jeff Peterson Memorial Cup (2007)

^{1}Championship not officially recognized by Ring of Honor.

== Luchas de Apuestas record ==
Winner (wager)	Loser (wager)	Location	Event	Date	Notes
Chris Hero (hair)	Equinox (mask)	Hellertown, Pennsylvania	The Sordid Perils of Everyday Existence	November 17, 2007	
