= Battle of Los Angeles (2007) =

2007 professional wrestling tournament by PWG

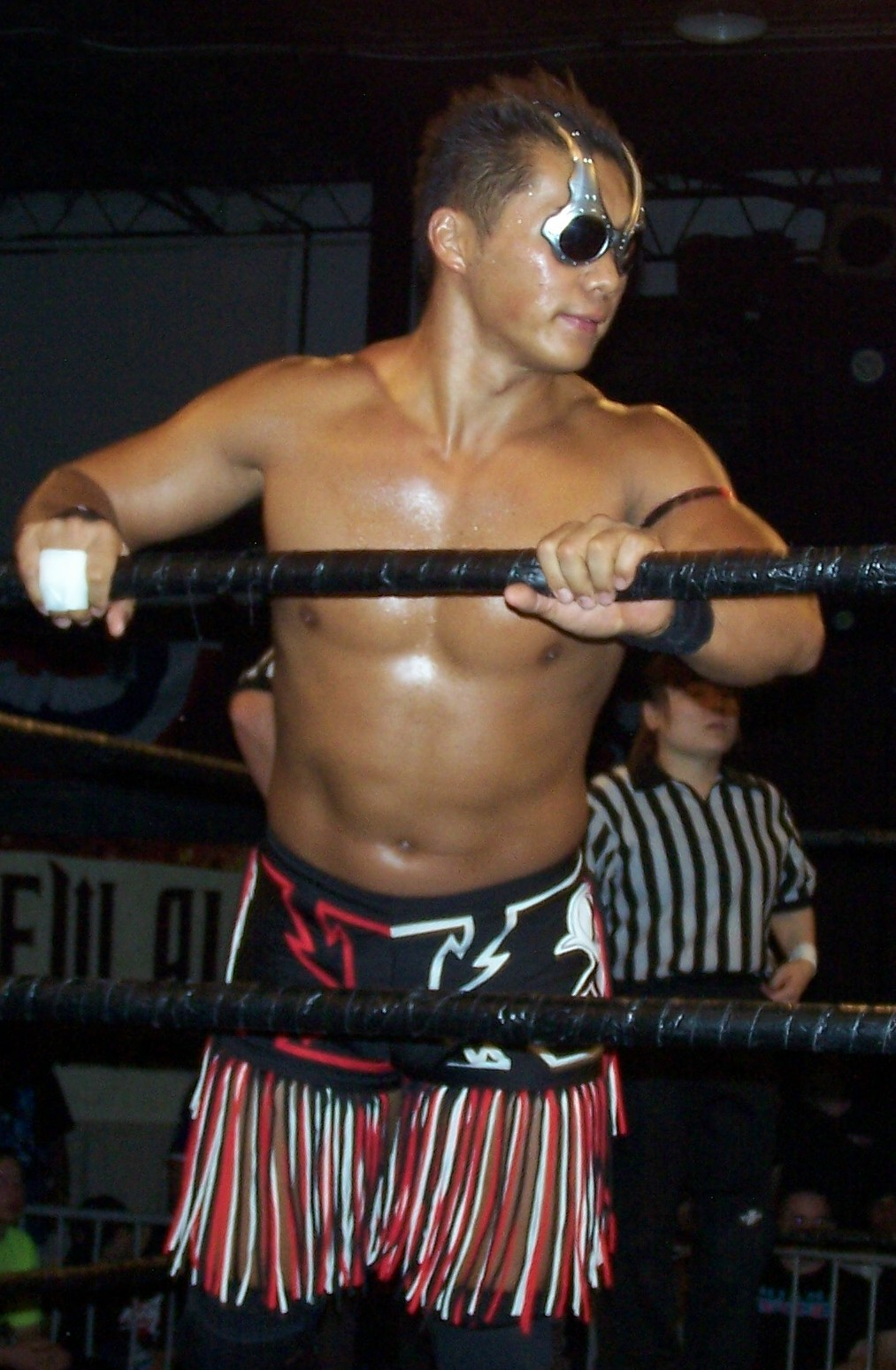
- The 2007 tournament winner Cima
- Promotion: Pro Wrestling Guerrilla
- Date: Night One: August 31, 2007; Night Two: September 1, 2007; Night Three: September 2, 2007
- City: Burbank, California
- Venue: Burbank Armory
- Attendance: 1425 (combined); Night One: 475; Night Two: 450; Night Three: 500

Event chronology
| ← Previous; Giant-Size Annual #4 | Next → Schadenfreude |

Battle of Los Angeles chronology
| ← Previous; 2006 | Next → 2008 |

Battle of Los Angeles (2007) was the third Battle of Los Angeles professional wrestling tournament produced by Pro Wrestling Guerrilla (PWG). The event was held on August 31, September 1 and September 2, 2007 at the Burbank Armory in Burbank, California.

The tournament featured the PWG debuts of Doug Williams, Susumu Yokosuka, Jimmy Rave and Nigel McGuinness. The tournament concluded with a three-way elimination match, in which CIMA defeated Roderick Strong and El Generico to win the 2007 Battle of Los Angeles tournament. The event also featured a World Tag Team Championship match on night one, in which El Generico and Kevin Steen successfully defended the titles against Dragon Kid and Susumu Yokosuka.

Other non-tournament matches included a tag team match on night one, in which The Young Bucks (Matt Jackson and Nick Jackson) defeated Los Luchas (Phoenix Star and Zokre), a tag team match on night two, in which Ronin and T.J. Perkins defeated Bino Gambino and Karl Anderson and a twelve-man tag team match on night three, in which the team of Chris Hero, Doug Williams, Jack Evans, Kevin Steen, Susumu Yokosuka and Tyler Black defeated Austin Aries, Davey Richards, Human Tornado, Jimmy Rave, Karl Anderson and Scott Lost.

== Background ==
=== Original lineup ===
Twenty-four participants were announced for the 2007 Battle of Los Angeles in June 2007. On June 16, PWG announced the first eight participants for the tournament including: Joey Ryan, Doug Williams, Susumu Yokosuka, Dragon Kid, 2005 winner Chris Bosh, 2006 winner Davey Richards, Jimmy Rave and Chris Hero. On June 27, the next eight participants were revealed for the tournament: Human Tornado, Jack Evans, Tyler Black, PAC, Roderick Strong, the World Tag Team Champion El Generico, Matt Sydal and Scott Lost. The final eight names were announced on June 29: Claudio Castagnoli, Shingo Takagi, the World Tag Team Champion Kevin Steen, World Champion Bryan Danielson, Super Dragon, Rocky Romero, Nigel McGuinness and CIMA.

=== Replacement ===
Due to injuries, many of the participants withdrew from the tournament. Bryan Danielson suffered from a detached retina in a match against Takeshi Morishima, which sidelined him for four to six weeks. Super Dragon also pulled out of the event and Chris Bosh also withdrew due to injuries and announced his retirement. They were replaced by TNA wrestler Alex Shelley, local worker Tony Kozina and Necro Butcher.

=== Qualification ===
At Dynamite Duumvirate Tag Team Title Tournament, Ronin took on Joey Ryan in a match which stipulated that if Ryan lost then his hair would be cut off and if Ronin lost then he would lose his spot in the 2007 Battle of Los Angeles tournament. Ryan won the match ending Ronin's chances of participating in the tournament. At Giant-Size Annual #4, a month before the Battle of Los Angeles, Austin Aries returned to PWG and defeated Rocky Romero to take his spot in BOLA.

== Event ==
=== Night one (August 31, 2007) ===
The event kicked off with a promo by the PWG World Champion Bryan Danielson, who apologized to the PWG fans for not being able to compete in the Battle of Los Angeles tournament due to injury and promised to compete at the next event.

The opening match was a tag team match between Los Luchas (Phoenix Star and Zokre) and The Young Bucks (Matt Jackson and Nick Jackson). Bucks performed More Bang for Your Buck on both Los Luchas and pinned both of them for the win.

It was followed by the beginning of the Battle of Los Angeles with a match between Chris Hero and Joey Ryan. Jade Chung distracted the referee while Hero had covered Ryan for the pinfall after a diving double foot stomp. Scott Lost took advantage of the distraction and tried to interfere by handing the brass knuckles to Ryan but Hero snatched these and delivered a Hero's Welcome to Ryan and pinned him for the win. However, after the match, the referee saw brass knuckles in Hero's hand and assumed that Hero hit Ryan with these and reversed the decision, allowing Ryan to advance in the tournament. An enraged Hero then hit Ryan with the knuckles.

Next, Austin Aries took on Roderick Strong. Strong pinned Aries with a roll-up for the win.

Next, Jimmy Rave made his PWG debut against Matt Sydal. Sydal performed a shooting star press on Rave for the win.

Next, Alex Shelley took on Tyler Black. After a series of near-falls, Shelley delivered a springboard cutter to Black for the win.

Next, Claudio Castagnoli took on the debuting Doug Williams. After Williams countered an earlier Ricola Bomb attempt by Castagnoli, the latter managed to deliver a Ricola Bomb for the win.

Next, Jack Evans took on PAC. Pac nailed a twisting shooting star press for the win.

It was followed by the night one's main event, in which El Generico and Kevin Steen defended the World Tag Team Championship against Dragon Kid and the debuting Susumu Yokosuka. Steen executed a package piledriver to Dragon Kid and pushed him to Generico, who hit a brainbuster to win the match and retain the titles.

=== Night two (September 1, 2007) ===
The night two of the Battle of Los Angeles tournament began with a tag team match pitting Ronin and T.J. Perkins against Bino Gambino and Karl Anderson. Ronin delivered a Death Valley driver to Gambino for the win.

It was followed by the first round match of the tournament between CIMA and Human Tornado. Tornado's mistreatment of his manager Candice LeRae led to LeRae turning on him as she hit a missile dropkick on Tornado and CIMA followed it by hitting a superkick and a Schwein to Tornado for the win. After the match, Tornado attacked LeRae until Chris Hero made the save.

Next, Scott Lost took on the debuting SHINGO. After suplexing SHINGO outside the ring, Lost tossed him into the ring and delivered a Superman Spear to SHINGO but SHINGO countered by delivering a Last Falconry to Lost for the win.

Next, Kevin Steen took on Necro Butcher. Butcher avoided a figure four leglock attempt by Steen and pinned him with a roll-up for the win.

Next, Davey Richards took on the debuting Nigel McGuinness. After avoiding a shooting star press by Richards, McGuinness tried to deliver a Tower of London to Richards but Richards was able to avoid it through the ropes. McGuinness hit a diving lariat and a Rebound Lariat for the win.

Next, El Generico took on Tony Kozina. Generico hit a brainbuster to Kozina for the win.

Next, Dragon Kid took on Susumu Yokosuka. Kid countered a crucifix powerbomb attempt by Yokosuka into a hurricanrana and followed by hitting a tilt-a-whirl DDT and a Dragonrana to Yokosuka for the win.

=== Night three (September 2, 2007) ===
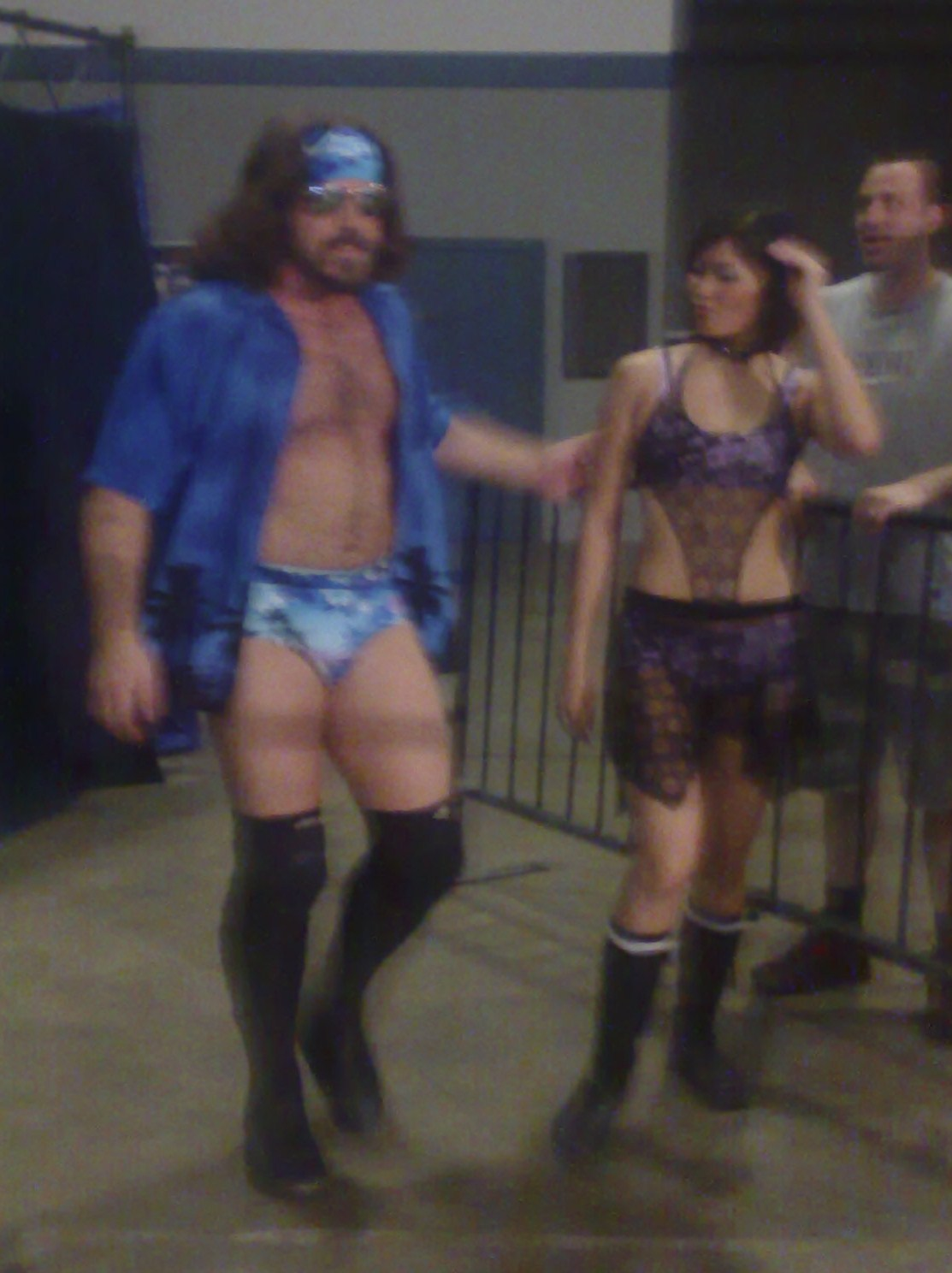
Joey Ryan (left) and Jade Chung (right) at night three of the 2007 Battle of Los Angeles

Quarterfinals

The night three kicked off with the quarterfinals of the Battle of Los Angeles between Roderick Strong and Joey Ryan. Strong made Ryan submit to the Stronghold for the win.

Next, Alex Shelley took on Matt Sydal. Shelley avoided a shooting star press by Sydal and hit a three-quarter facelock bulldog and a It Came From Japan for the win.

Next, Claudio Castagnoli took on PAC. Castagnoli got a near-fall after delivering an Alpamare Waterslide on PAC until PAC recovered to hit a tilt-a-whirl DDT and a British Airways for the win.

Next, CIMA took on SHINGO. After getting a near-fall on SHINGO following a Schwein, CIMA pinned SHINGO with a pinning combination culminating in a roll-up for the win.

Next, Necro Butcher took on Nigel McGuinness. Necro suffered a knee injury mid-way through the match allowing McGuinness to capitalize him by suplexing him onto the chairs which Necro brought into the ring. Necro's knee hit the chair further injuring it and allowing McGuinness to hit a Rebound Lariat for the win.

Next, Dragon Kid took on El Generico. Kid got a near-fall on Generico after hitting a Dragonrana and then climbed the top rope but Generico hit a running big boot to Kid in the corner and nailed a Brainbustah!!! for the win.

Semifinals

Alex Shelley took on Roderick Strong in the first semifinal match. Strong got out of a Border City Stretch by Shelley and nailed two Gibson Drivers to Shelley for the win.

Next, CIMA took on PAC. CIMA caught PAC on the top rope by attacking him and delivered a Schwein to PAC from the top rope onto the mat for the win.

Next, Nigel McGuinness took on El Generico. Generico avoided a Rebound Lariat by McGuinness and pinned him with a schoolboy for the win.

Non-tournament match

It was followed by the penultimate twelve-man tag team match in which Chris Hero, Doug Williams, Jack Evans, Kevin Steen, Susumu Yokosuka and Tyler Black took on Austin Aries, Davey Richards, Human Tornado, Jimmy Rave, Karl Anderson and Scott Lost. Tornado pretended to dive outside the ring but did not dive and stalked Candice LeRae, allowing Hero to roll him up to pin him for the win.

Final

It was followed by a three-way elimination match between CIMA, El Generico and Roderick Strong. After getting a near-fall on Generico following a Schwein on the apron, CIMA hit a superkick, a brainbuster and a Schwein Redline to Generico to eliminate him. After a back and forth contest, Strong nailed a Gibson Driver to CIMA to get a near-fall and attempted another Gibson Driver but CIMA got out of the hold and nailed a Crossface to Strong to eliminate him to win the 2007 Battle of Los Angeles. After the match, the World Champion Bryan Danielson presented CIMA with the BOLA trophy and the two teased a potential World Championship match in the future.

== Reception ==
Arnold Furious of 411Mania rated the first two nights "underwhelming" but highly praised the night three, considering it a "Superb final night with no shortage of excellent storytelling and energised wrestling". He rated the third night 8.5.

TJ Hawke of 411Mania gave a mixed reception to the tournament, rating 7 to night one and night two, while praising the night three and rating it 8.5, considering the 2007 BOLA a "a great tournament to experience".

== Aftermath ==
Chris Hero and Candice LeRae's alliance subsequently formed and they began a lengthy feud with Human Tornado after Battle of Los Angeles as Hero and Tornado had their first singles encounter, the following month at Schaedenfraude, which Tornado won. Tornado defeated Hero again during the European Vacation tour. At The High Cost of Doing Business, a match was scheduled pitting Hero and Eddie Kingston against Tornado and a mystery partner. Kingston eventually turned on Hero and revealed himself to be Tornado's partner, making it a handicap match. Hero's former Kings of Wrestling tag team partner Claudio Castagnoli ran in to make the save but eventually turned on Hero to join Tornado and Kingston. During the night one of All Star Weekend 6, Hero, LeRae and Necro Butcher lost a six-person tag team match to Tornado, Castagnoli and Kingston. One night later, Tornado and LeRae had a singles encounter where LeRae was disqualified after Hero made the save and attacked Tornado. At Pearl Habra, Tornado defeated Hero in a no disqualification match. After Tornado won the PWG World Championship, Hero defeated Tornado in a Guerrilla Warfare at Life During Wartime to win the title and end the feud.

After the Battle of Los Angeles tournament, CIMA did not go the traditional route of challenging for the PWG World Championship and instead went to his native Japan to compete in his home promotion Dragon Gate. Bryan Danielson instead defended the title against Roderick Strong, the following month at Schadenfreude. CIMA returned to PWG on the night one of All Star Weekend 6, where he defeated Susumu Yokosuka and then finally received a match against Danielson on the night two, which ended in a draw.

== Results ==
Night 1 (August 31)
| No. | Results | Stipulations | Times |
|---|---|---|---|
| 1 | The Young Bucks (Matt Jackson and Nick Jackson) defeated Los Luchas (Phoenix Star and Zokre) | Tag team match | 9:00 |
| 2 | Joey Ryan (with Jade Chung) defeated Chris Hero via reverse decision | Singles match in the first round of Battle of Los Angeles tournament | 17:00 |
| 3 | Roderick Strong defeated Austin Aries | Singles match in the first round of Battle of Los Angeles tournament | 14:00 |
| 4 | Matt Sydal defeated Jimmy Rave | Singles match in the first round of Battle of Los Angeles tournament | 10:00 |
| 5 | Alex Shelley defeated Tyler Black | Singles match in the first round of Battle of Los Angeles tournament | 20:00 |
| 6 | Claudio Castagnoli defeated Doug Williams | Singles match in the first round of Battle of Los Angeles tournament | 15:00 |
| 7 | PAC defeated Jack Evans | Singles match in the first round of Battle of Los Angeles tournament | 12:00 |
| 8 | El Generico and Kevin Steen (c) defeated Dragon Kid and Susumu Yokosuka | Tag team match for the PWG World Tag Team Championship | 18:00 |
(c) / – the champion(s) heading into the match

Night 2 (September 1)
| No. | Results | Stipulations | Times |
|---|---|---|---|
| 1 | Ronin and T.J. Perkins defeated Bino Gambino and Karl Anderson | Tag team match | 12:00 |
| 2 | CIMA defeated Human Tornado (with Candice LeRae) | Singles match in the first round of Battle of Los Angeles tournament | 12:00 |
| 3 | SHINGO defeated Scott Lost | Singles match in the first round of Battle of Los Angeles tournament | 13:00 |
| 4 | Necro Butcher defeated Kevin Steen | Singles match in the first round of Battle of Los Angeles tournament | 8:00 |
| 5 | Nigel McGuinness defeated Davey Richards | Singles match in the first round of Battle of Los Angeles tournament | 15:00 |
| 6 | El Generico defeated Tony Kozina | Singles match in the first round of Battle of Los Angeles tournament | 13:00 |
| 7 | Dragon Kid defeated Susumu Yokosuka | Singles match in the first round of Battle of Los Angeles tournament | 16:00 |

Night 3 (September 2)
| No. | Results | Stipulations | Times |
|---|---|---|---|
| 1 | Roderick Strong defeated Joey Ryan (with Jade Chung) | Singles match in the quarter-final round of Battle of Los Angeles tournament | 7:30 |
| 2 | Alex Shelley defeated Matt Sydal | Singles match in the quarter-final round of Battle of Los Angeles tournament | 12:41 |
| 3 | PAC defeated Claudio Castagnoli | Singles match in the quarter-final round of Battle of Los Angeles tournament | 12:10 |
| 4 | CIMA defeated SHINGO | Singles match in the quarter-final round of Battle of Los Angeles tournament | 12:06 |
| 5 | Nigel McGuinness defeated Necro Butcher | Singles match in the quarter-final round of Battle of Los Angeles tournament | 8:23 |
| 6 | El Generico defeated Dragon Kid | Singles match in the quarter-final round of Battle of Los Angeles tournament | 8:11 |
| 7 | Roderick Strong defeated Alex Shelley | Singles match in the semi-final round of Battle of Los Angeles tournament | 15:29 |
| 8 | CIMA defeated PAC | Singles match in the semi-final round of Battle of Los Angeles tournament | 14:09 |
| 9 | El Generico defeated Nigel McGuinness | Singles match in the semi-final round of Battle of Los Angeles tournament | 12:36 |
| 10 | Chris Hero, Doug Williams, Jack Evans, Kevin Steen, Susumu Yokosuka and Tyler Black (with Candice LeRae) defeated Austin Aries, Davey Richards, Human Tornado, Jimmy Rave, Karl Anderson and Scott Lost (with Jade Chung) | Twelve-man tag team match | 22:53 |
| 11 | CIMA defeated El Generico and Roderick Strong | Three-way elimination match in the Battle of Los Angeles tournament final | 13:17 |

=== Tournament brackets ===
Battle of Los Angeles (2007)
Tournament information
- Sport: Professional wrestling
- Location: Burbank, California
- Dates: August 31, 2007–September 2, 2007
- Tournament format(s): Single elimination tournament
- Participants: 24

Final positions
- Champion: Cima
- 1st runner-up: Roderick Strong
- 2nd runner-up: El Generico

First round
Joey Ryan | DQ
Chris Hero | 16:42
Roderick Strong | Pin
Austin Aries | 14:30
Jimmy Rave | Pin
Matt Sydal | 09:32
Alex Shelley | Pin
Tyler Black | 20:07

Quarterfinals
Joey Ryan | Sub
Roderick Strong | 07:32
Matt Sydal | Pin
Alex Shelley | 12:41

Semifinals
Roderick Strong | Pin
Alex Shelley | 15:30

First round
Claudio Castagnoli | Pin
Doug Williams | 14:33
Jack Evans | Pin
Pac | 11:36
Cima | Pin
Human Tornado | 10:53
Scott Lost | Pin
Shingo Takagi | 11:53

Quarterfinals
Claudio Castagnoli | Pin
Pac | 12:10
Cima | Pin
Shingo Takagi | 12:05

Semifinals
Pac | Pin
Cima | 14:12

First round
Necro Butcher | Pin
Kevin Steen | 08:15
Nigel McGuinness | Pin
Davey Richards | 15:32
El Generico | Pin
Tony Kozina | 12:09
Dragon Kid | Pin
Susumu Yokosuka | 16:36

Quarterfinals
Necro Butcher | Pin
Nigel McGuinness | 08:20
El Generico | Pin
Dragon Kid | 08:01

Semifinals
Nigel McGuinness | Pin
El Generico | 12:48

| Finals |
| Cima | Pin |
| Roderick Strong El Generico | 13:17 |
