= Jade Chung =

Canadian professional wrestler and model

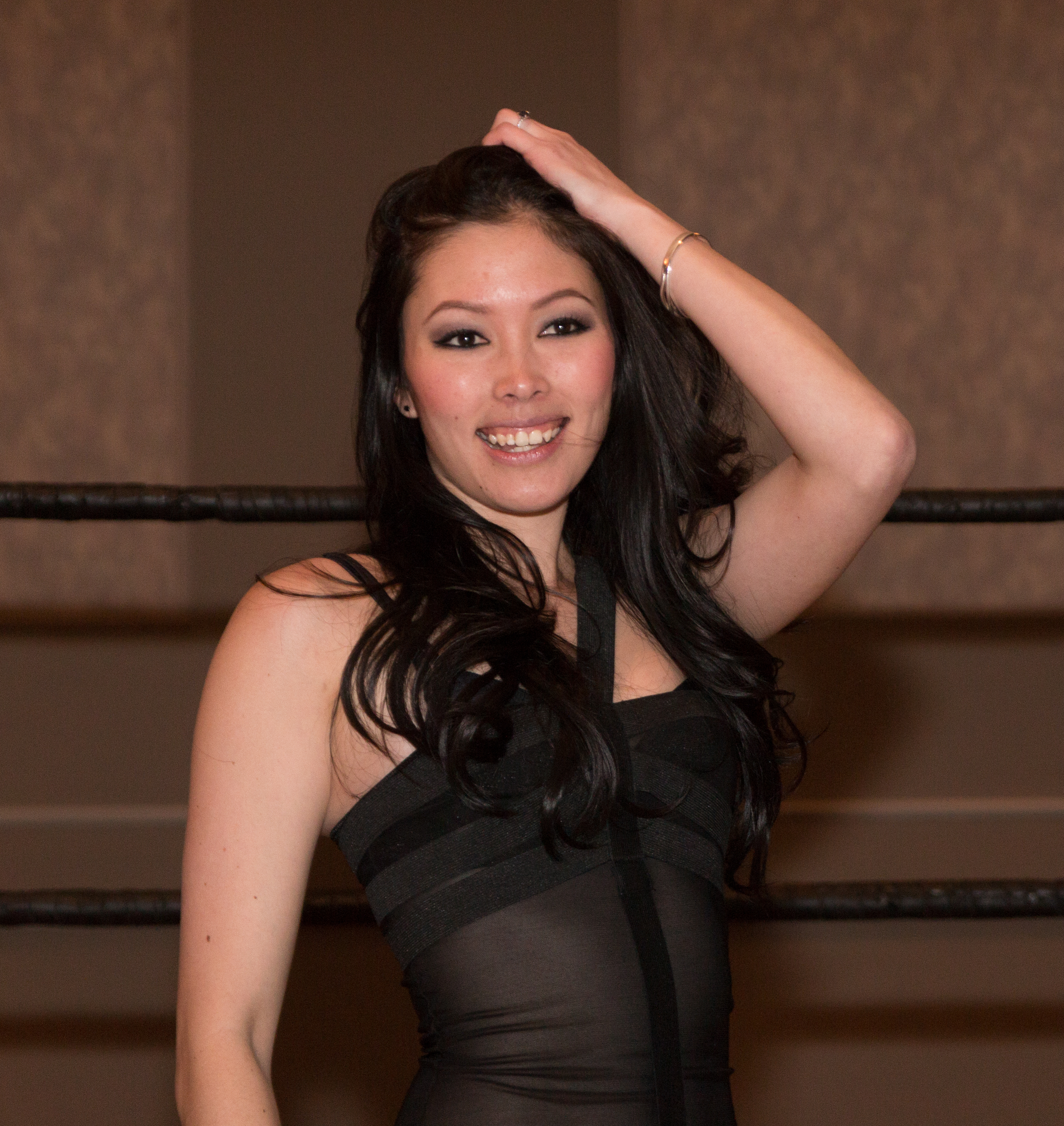
- Chung in 2014.

Personal information
- Born: Jennifer Chung; November 6, 1984 (age 41) Guelph, Ontario, Canada
- Spouse: Josh Alexander (m. 2016)
- Children: 2

Professional wrestling career
- Ring name(s): Jade Chung; Jennifer Chung
- Billed height: 5 ft 6 in (168 cm)
- Billed weight: 110 lb (50 kg)
- Trained by: Rob Fuego; Tom Howard
- Debut: September 14, 2003

Jennifer Chung (born November 6, 1984) is a Canadian professional wrestler, professional wrestling manager, ring announcer, and model. She worked for Total Nonstop Action Wrestling (TNA), as a ring announcer under the ring name Jade Chung.

Chung has appeared with professional wrestling promotions such as Border City Wrestling, IWA Mid-South, Ring of Honor and Pro Wrestling Guerrilla. Wrestlers she has managed include Frankie Kazarian, Jimmy Rave, N8 Mattson, Conrad Kennedy III, A-1, Scorpio Sky, Mr. Hughes and Shane Douglas.

== Modeling career ==
Born in Guelph, Ontario, of Chinese Vietnamese descent, Chung started modelling at the age of 12 as a runway model and appeared in cover stories for several fashion magazines while modelling in Vietnam. In 2002, she won the "Cover Girl" title from the Vietnamese fashion magazine Thoi Moi in 2002 and appeared on the cover of two other Vietnamese fashion magazines the following year. Chung was also one of 500 models selected to represent ImportFest 2003 in Toronto and was a top ten finalist in the 2004 Miss Viet Canada Pageant. She also starred as an extra in Ashanti's "Rain on Me" music video.

== Professional wrestling career ==
=== Early career (2003–2005) ===
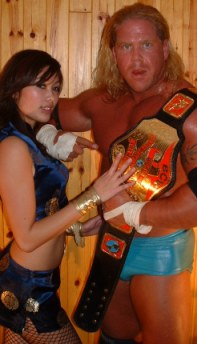
Chung (left) with BCW Can-Am Heavyweight Champion A-1 in December 2004

A professional wrestling fan as a child, Chung often watched the World Wrestling Federation while attending high school. She was encouraged to enter professional wrestling after meeting Beth Phoenix and Traci Brooks at a local wrestling event and spent her summers training at Rob Fuego's Toronto-based wrestling school Squared Circle Training. Having some friends already in professional wrestling, she later attended local independent shows in hopes of getting hired full-time.

Chung made her debut for wrestler/promoter Scott D'Amore's Border City Wrestling where, in September 2003, she managed Shane Douglas to win the BCW Can-Am Heavyweight Championship from D-Lo Brown. She would spend the next two years in various independent promotions in Canada and the United States. At A Night of Appreciation for Sabu, she was in the corner of A-1 when he defeated D-Lo Brown to win the BCW Can-Am Heavyweight Championship in Belleville, Michigan on December 12, 2004.

=== Ring of Honor (2005) ===
In early 2005, Chung made her debut in Ring of Honor (ROH) as a valet for manager Prince Nana's stable The Embassy, replacing Angel Williams. Although part of one of the top factions in the promotion, Chung was used as a footstool for members of the stable, particularly Jimmy Rave. She was in the corner of Rave when he defeated CM Punk in a dog collar match at "Manhattan Mayhem" on May 31. During the match, she was one of several members of The Embassy to interfere in the match and, at one point, she entered the ring to apply a sleeper hold on Punk.

After Rave lost to Roderick Strong on October 1, 2005, Chung left The Embassy to become the manager of Generation Next in their feud with The Embassy. The following night, she interfered in a match between Rave and Matt Sydal, costing Rave the match. She continued to feud with rival manager Prince Nana and, during a match on October 29, she attacked him with a tilt-a-whirl DDT. On November 5, ROH announced that Chung had been attacked by an unidentified man in the parking lot. A still photo of Jimmy Rave was shown on November 19 attacking Chung, and ROH claimed that she was no longer involved in wrestling. The feud was finally concluded at "Steel Cage Warfare" in December 2005 when she made a surprise appearance during the main event, an 8-man Steel Cage Warfare match between The Embassy and Generation Next. Chung, who appeared with bandages as a result of her attack by Rave, distracted The Embassy long enough for Jack Evans to enter the match and perform a double moonsault off the top of the cage. After Generation Next defeated The Embassy, Chung used Rave as her footstool during the in-ring celebration after the match. Chung subsequently departed ROH.

=== Pro Wrestling Guerrilla (2006–2008) ===
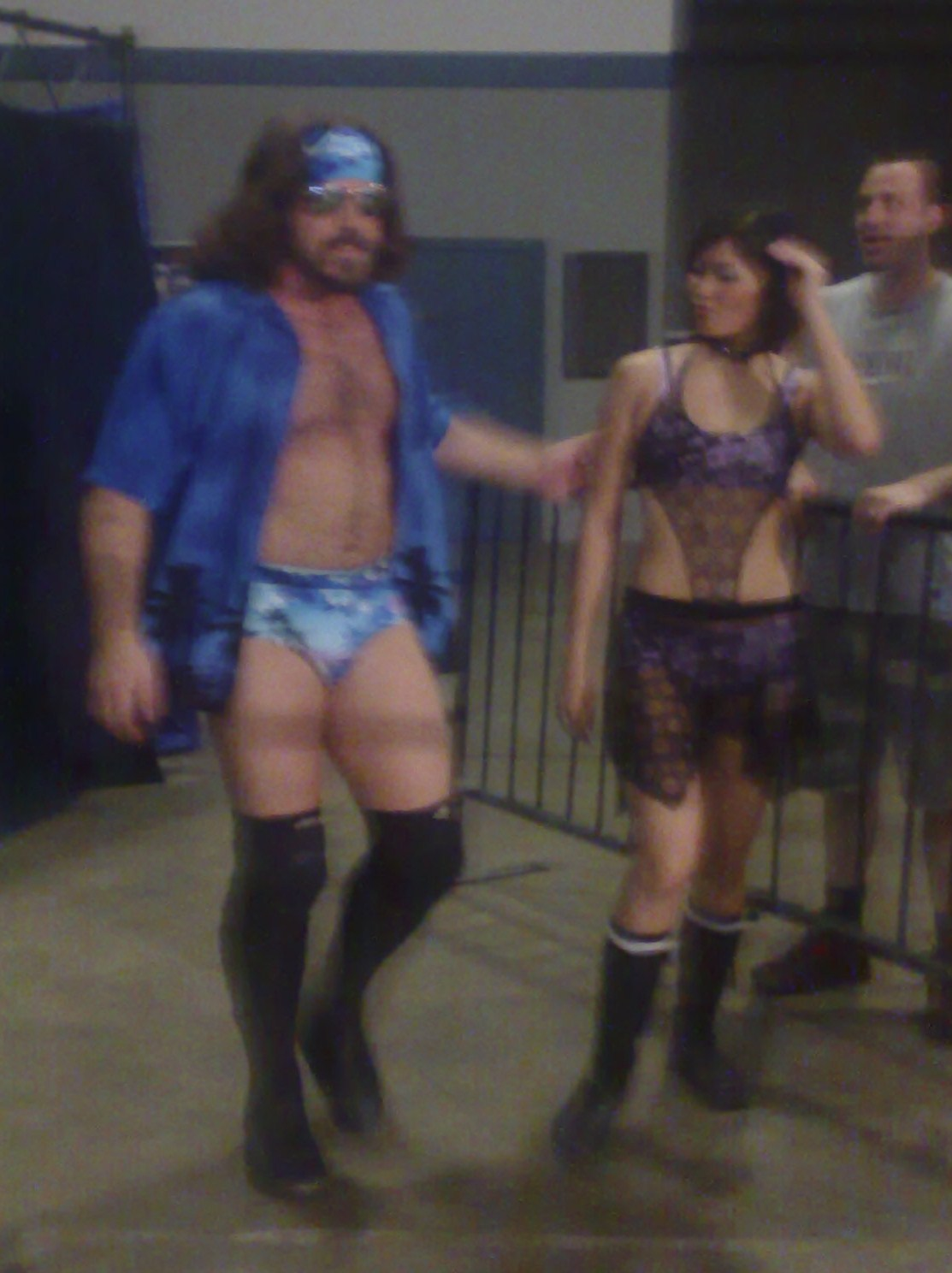
Chung (right) with Joey Ryan at night three of the Pro Wrestling Guerrilla event "Battle of Los Angeles" in September 2007

In March 2006, Chung debuted in Pro Wrestling Guerrilla (PWG) as the manager of the tag team "Dark and Lovely" (Human Tornado and Scorpio Sky). She also managed Joey Ryan in single matches during the same time in PWG.

In October 2006, Chung participated in a "First Blood Handicap" match with Scorpio Sky, teaming as the "Scorpio Sky Experience", to defeat Frankie Kazarian. A month later, her stable (Scorpio Sky, Chris Bosh, Scott Lost, and Joey Ryan) lost an eight-man tag team match to Candice LeRae's team (Frankie Kazarian, Human Tornado, El Generico, and Quicksilver). She eventually turned on Scorpio Sky after he lost a "Loser Leaves PWG" match to Frankie Kazarian on January 27, 2007.

At the Battle of Los Angeles in August and September 2007, Chung accompanied Joey Ryan and Scott Lost to ringside for their matches in the titular tournament. In January 2008, Chung appeared with Lost and Ryan as they faced The Age of the Fall (Tyler Black and Jimmy Jacobs) at PWG All Star Weekend 6, Night 1 in Van Nuys, California. On March 21, 2008, Chung was injured by Super Dragon during a tag team match between The Dynasty and Kevin Steen and El Generico. She was forced to take a leave of absence and, as a result, Scott Lost and Joey Ryan lost several opportunities to win the PWG Tag Team Championship in matches against El Blazer and Kagetora and Los Luchas (Phoenix Star and Zokre).

=== Various promotions (2006–2023) ===
In 2006, Chung made an appearance at All Pro Wrestling's Gym Wars, being in the corner of B-Boy in his defeat against MPT, and for Battle Ground Wrestling with Scott Lost losing a match to Foob Dogg for a lifetime contract with the company.

In November 2007 at the NWA supercard Bloodlust! 3, she and Kitana Vera defeated Candice LeRae and Carla Jade in a tag team match in Covina, California.

In November 2019 in Alpha-1 Wrestling, Chung substituted for her husband Josh Alexander, teaming with Ethan Page to defend their A1 Tag Team Championship in a three way match that was won by Fight or Flight (Gabriel Fuerza and Vaughn Vertigo).

=== Impact Wrestling / Total Nonstop Action Wrestling (2023–2024) ===
In April 2022, Chung appeared at ringside for her husband Josh Alexander's Impact World Championship bout at the Impact Wrestling event Rebellion. In May 2023, Impact Wrestling announced that Chung was joining its broadcast team as a ring announcer for Before the Impact and a host for pre-shows. In December 2023, Impact Wrestling announced that Chung would serve as its main ring announcer starting at Hard To Kill in January 2024, replacing David Penzer. She left TNA in December 2024.

== Personal life ==
Chung is married to professional wrestler Josh Alexander, with whom she has two children.
