= Battle of Los Angeles (2008) =

2008 professional wrestling tournament by PWG

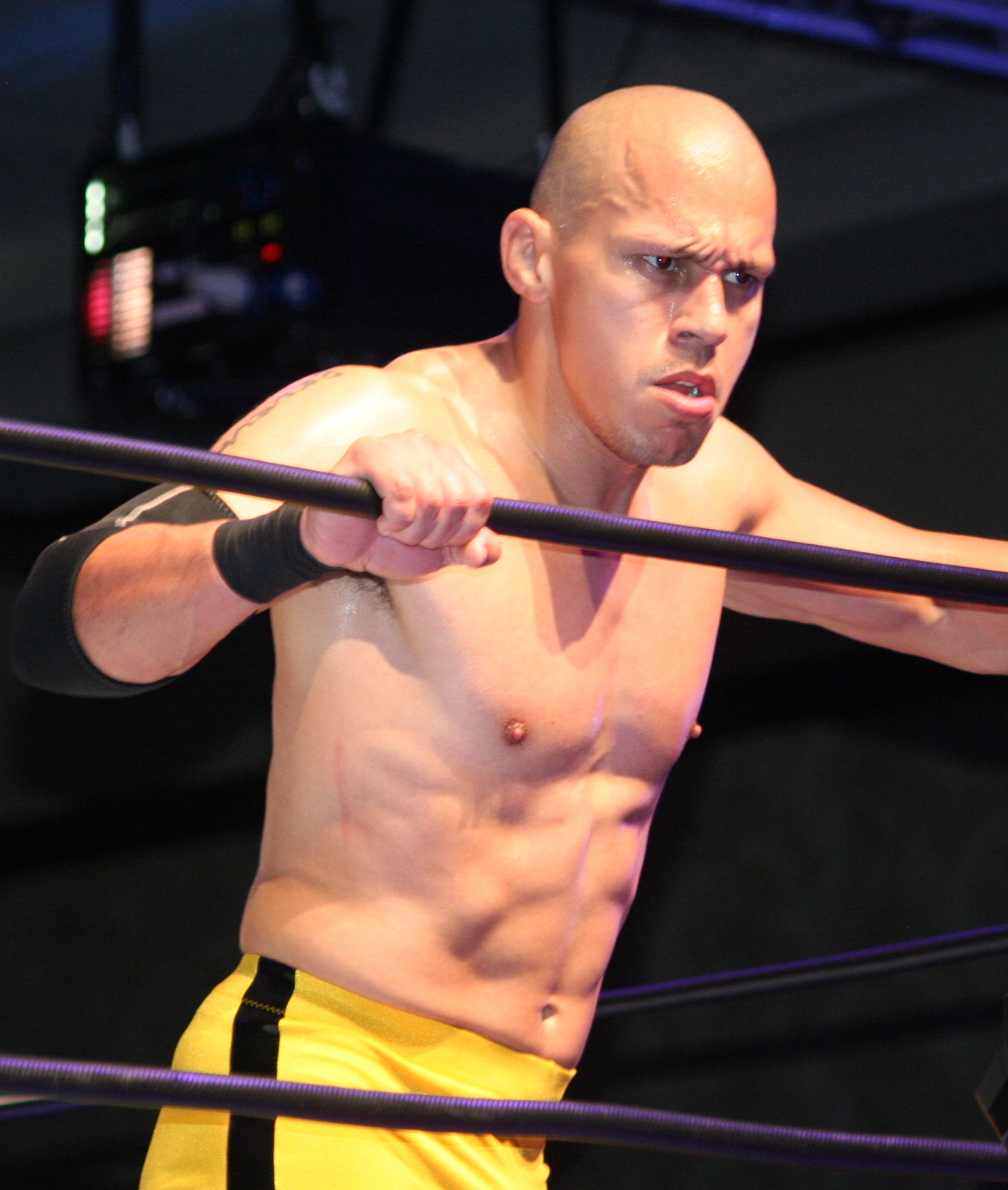
- The 2008 tournament winner Low Ki
- Promotion: Pro Wrestling Guerrilla
- Date: Night One: November 1, 2008; Night Two: November 2, 2008
- City: Burbank, California
- Venue: Burbank Armory

Event chronology
← Previous; All Star Weekend 7	Next → The Gentle Art of Making Enemies

Battle of Los Angeles chronology
← Previous; 2007	Next → 2009

Battle of Los Angeles (2008) was the fourth Battle of Los Angeles professional wrestling tournament produced by Pro Wrestling Guerrilla (PWG). The event took place on November 1 and November 2, 2008 in Burbank, California.

The tournament concluded with a final match in which Low Ki defeated the PWG World Champion Chris Hero. Aside from the tournament matches, the tournament featured a three-way nine-man tag team match, in which the losers of the first round of the tournament competed. The event marked the PWG debut of Kenny Omega.

== Background ==
The 2008 Battle of Los Angeles tournament was set to follow the 24-man format of the previous two editions of the tournament and take place on the weekend of August 30 and 31, but PWG management was unable to book the talent they wished to for the event and decided to move the event and drop the entrants down to 16. However, the field was included to add one more participant, making it a total of seventeen participants as the two PWG commissioners Excalibur and Dino Winwood couldn't come to a conclusion on who would be the final entrant. The participants were announced as: 2006 winner Davey Richards, Chuck Taylor, Masato Yoshino, El Generico, Kenny Omega, Brandon Bonham, Austin Aries, the World Champion Chris Hero, Necro Butcher, Scott Lost, the World Tag Team Champion Nick Jackson, Roderick Strong, Nigel McGuinness, Joey Ryan, T.J. Perkins, Bryan Danielson and Low Ki. PWG announced the lineup for the first round of the tournament, with one match being a three-way match between El Generico, Masato Yoshino and Nick Jackson due to the total number of seventeen participants. Chris Hero and Necro Butcher's first round match was announced to be a no disqualification match.

== Event ==
=== Night 1 ===
The 2008 Battle of Los Angeles tournament first round kicked off with a match between T.J. Perkins and Chuck Taylor. Taylor initially won the match after hitting Perkins with brass knuckles but the referee realized that Taylor had used the foreign object and therefore reversed the decision and awarded the win to Perkins.

Next, Kenny Omega made his PWG debut against Brandon Bonham. Omega had raised Bonham on his shoulders but Bonham countered by hitting a flip piledriver for the win.

Next, Austin Aries took on Nigel McGuinness. Aries tried to apply a Last Chancery but McGuinness moved out of it and applied an armbar on Aries to force him to submit for the win.

Next, Low Ki took on Roderick Strong. Ki applied a Dragon Clutch on Strong to make him submit for the win.

Next, Joey Ryan took on Scott Lost. Lost avoided a That 70's Kick by Ryan and kicked him in the head for the win.

Next, Bryan Danielson took on Davey Richards. Danielson made Richards submit to the Cattle Mutilation for the win.

It was followed by a three-way match between Nick Jackson, El Generico and Masato Yoshino. Yoshino picked up a submission victory to advance in the tournament.

Next was the night one's main event, a no disqualification match between Chris Hero and Necro Butcher. Hero applied a Hangman's Clutch on Butcher to make him submit for the win.

=== Night 2 ===
Quarterfinals

The night two began with the quarterfinals of the Battle of Los Angeles with the first quarterfinal match taking place between Nigel McGuinness and Brandon Bonham. McGuinness caught Bonham on the top rope and hit a Tower of London for the win.

Next, Low Ki took on Masato Yoshino. Ki avoided a neckbreaker by Yoshino and dropkicked him and then applied a Dragon Clutch on Yoshino for the win.

Next, Bryan Danielson took on T.J. Perkins. Danielson caught Perkins with a sunset flip from the apron into the ring and pinned him for the win.

Next, Chris Hero took on Scott Lost. Hero hit an elbow smash to Lost and applied a Hangman's Clutch on Lost to make him submit.

Semifinals

The first semifinal match took place between Nigel McGuinness and Low Ki. McGuinness was disqualified when he countered a Dragon Clutch attempt by delivering a Tower of London to Ki onto a chair. As a result, Ki advanced to the final round.

Next, Chris Hero took on Bryan Danielson. Hero put a running Danielson down with a dragon screw legswhip and applied a Hangman's Clutch on Danielson to make him submit for the win.

Non-tournament match

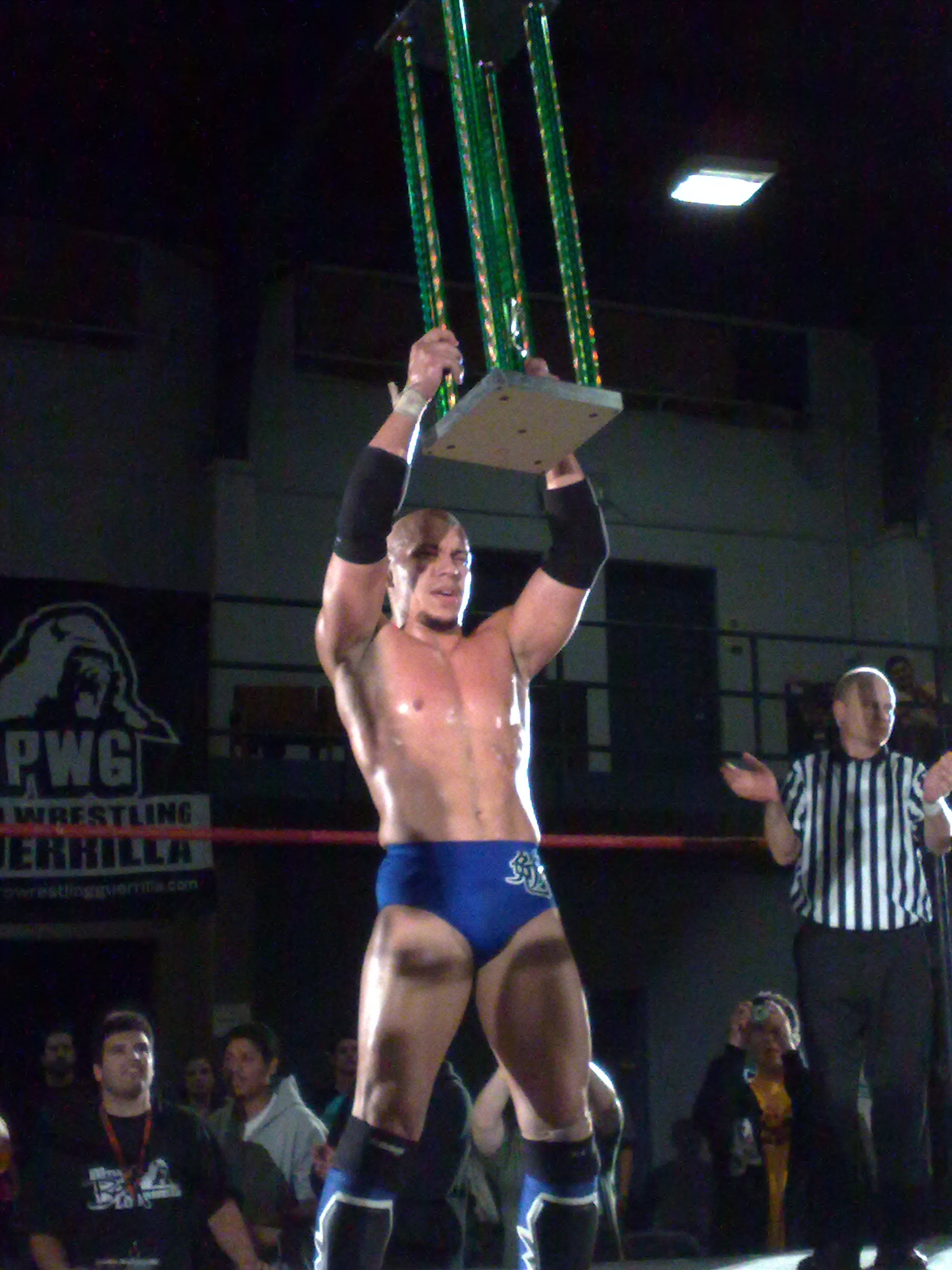
The 2008 tournament winner Low Ki.

The penultimate match was a three-way nine-man tag team match in which the nine losers of the opening round competed. It pit the team of Austin Aries, Davey Richards and Roderick Strong against the team of Nick Jackson, El Generico and Necro Butcher and the team of Chuck Taylor, Kenny Omega and Joey Ryan. Richards pinned Butcher with a roll-up and the referee made the fast count, prompting Butcher to hit referee with a chair in the head.

Final

The Battle of Los Angeles final took place between Chris Hero and Low Ki. After getting out of a Hangman's Clutch by Hero, Ki countered a running elbow smash by Hero by dropkicking him and then applied a Dragon Clutch on Hero to make him submit to the hold to win the 2008 Battle of Los Angeles tournament.

== Reception ==
Bob Colling of 411Mania rated the first night 7.3, considering it a "solid night one of the tournament" with five of the matches having "some kind of entertainment attached to them". He considered the second night "a better night than night one" and praised the semi-final match between Chris Hero and Bryan Danielson as "a nicely done match". The tournament final between Chris Hero and Low Ki on the night two received praise from critics, with the Southern California-based wrestling website SoCal Uncensored awarding it the 2008 Southern California Match of the Year Award.

== Aftermath ==
After winning the Battle of Los Angeles, Low Ki signed a developmental contract with WWE and his contract prevented him from competing for PWG, therefore he could not appear at PWG and was unable to challenge for the PWG World Championship, a title shot guaranteed for the Battle of Los Angeles winner. Ki returned to PWG two years later at Kurt RussellReunion II: The Reunioning in 2011 and finally received a title shot against Claudio Castagnoli at All Star Weekend 8, where he failed to win.

== Results ==
Night 1 (November 1)
No.	Results	Stipulations	Times
1	T.J. Perkins defeated Chuck Taylor via reverse decision	Singles match in the first round of Battle of Los Angeles tournament	12:28
2	Brandon Bonham defeated Kenny Omega	Singles match in the first round of Battle of Los Angeles tournament	16:34
3	Nigel McGuinness defeated Austin Aries	Singles match in the first round of Battle of Los Angeles tournament	14:49
4	Low Ki defeated Roderick Strong	Singles match in the first round of Battle of Los Angeles tournament	16:54
5	Scott Lost defeated Joey Ryan	Singles match in the first round of Battle of Los Angeles tournament	12:38
6	Bryan Danielson defeated Davey Richards	Singles match in the first round of Battle of Los Angeles tournament	21:44
7	Masato Yoshino defeated El Generico and Nick Jackson	Three-way match in the first round of Battle of Los Angeles tournament	13:50
8	Chris Hero defeated Necro Butcher	No Disqualification match in the first round of Battle of Los Angeles tournament	29:39

Night 2 (November 2)
No.	Results	Stipulations	Times
1	Nigel McGuinness defeated Brandon Bonham	Singles match in the quarter-final round of Battle of Los Angeles tournament	8:33
2	Low Ki defeated Masato Yoshino	Singles match in the quarter-final round of Battle of Los Angeles tournament	7:46
3	Bryan Danielson defeated T.J. Perkins	Singles match in the quarter-final round of Battle of Los Angeles tournament	22:10
4	Chris Hero defeated Scott Lost	Singles match in the quarter-final round of Battle of Los Angeles tournament	11:38
5	Low Ki defeated Nigel McGuinness by disqualification	Singles match in the semi-final round of Battle of Los Angeles tournament	8:48
6	Chris Hero defeated Bryan Danielson	Singles match in the semi-final round of Battle of Los Angeles tournament	14:06
7	Austin Aries, Davey Richards and Roderick Strong defeated El Generico, Necro Butcher and Nick Jackson and Chuck Taylor, Joey Ryan and Kenny Omega	Three-way nine-man tag team match	27:47
8	Low Ki defeated Chris Hero	Singles match in the Battle of Los Angeles tournament final	18:56

=== Tournament brackets ===
Battle of Los Angeles (2008)
Tournament information
- Sport: Professional wrestling
- Location: Burbank, California
- Dates: November 1, 2008–November 2, 2008
- Tournament format: Single elimination tournament
- Participants: 17

Final positions
- Champion: Low Ki
- Runner-up: Chris Hero

First round
Brandon Bonham	Pin
Kenny Omega	16:35
Austin Aries	Sub
Nigel McGuinness	14:46
Low Ki	Sub
Roderick Strong	16:53
El Generico Nick Jackson	Sub
Masato Yoshino *	13:52
T. J. Perkins	DQ
Chuck Taylor	12:29
Bryan Danielson	Sub
Davey Richards	21:49
Chris Hero †	Sub
Necro Butcher †	29:40
Scott Lost	Pin
Joey Ryan	12:39

Second round
Brandon Bonham	Pin
Nigel McGuinness	08:31
Low Ki	Sub
Masato Yoshino	7:45
T. J. Perkins	Pin
Bryan Danielson	22:12
Chris Hero	Sub
Scott Lost	11:38

Semifinals
Nigel McGuinness	DQ
Low Ki	08:48
Bryan Danielson	Sub
Chris Hero	14:07

Finals
Low Ki	Sub
Chris Hero	18:56

* = This match was a three-way dance † = This was a No Disqualification match
