= Brandon Gatson =

American professional wrestler (born 1984)

Personal information
- Born: May 29, 1984 (age 42) Austin, Texas

Professional wrestling career
- Ring name(s): Brandon Nitro; Brandon Gatson
- Billed height: 6 ft 0 in (1.83 m)
- Billed weight: 205 lb (93 kg)
- Billed from: Austin, Texas
- Trained by: Jesse Hernandez
- Debut: 2000

Brandon Gatson (born May 29, 1984) is an American professional wrestler. He has worked for several independent promotions throughout the southwest United States and has appeared on several episodes of WWE and NWA television as both enhancement talent and featured talent.

== Professional wrestling career ==
=== Early career ===
Gatson began his career in professional wrestling at the age of 15. He has a background in gymnastics and dancing. His older brother is Olympic gymnast Jason Gatson. He was trained in professional wrestling at the School of Hard Knocks by Jesse Hernandez.

=== Empire Wrestling Federation ===
==== Tag team wrestling (2003–2007) ====
In 2000, Gatson joined Empire Wrestling Federation (EWF), where his first professional match was against Aggravated Assault (Malice and Mayhem) and Los Cubanitos (Rocky Romero and Ricky Reyes) in a tag match alongside his partner Johnny Dynamite as the Blonde Bombers. The Blonde Bombers had a good chemistry, but the team was forced to break up when Johnny Dynamite chose to enlist in the Army and fight in Iraq. Brandon then went on to form his own name as a singles competitor in the EWF and upon the return of Dynamite, they reformed their team, this time known as TNT. They quickly became a dominant force in the tag team division and became the EWF Tag Team Champions by defeating The Iron Express, the team of Joey Harder and Hook Bomberry at Overkill 2 on April 27, 2007. They had no time to enjoy their victory however as Aggravated Assault came to the ring shortly thereafter and demanded a title shot. Their feud was a truly brutal one and it culminated in Tables match that saw Aggravated Assault taking the EWF Tag Team Titles at No Excuses on August 24, 2007. After this feud ended, Johnny Dynamite again had to answer his call to duty and moved to Arizona and TNT ended its run as a tag team. Brandon, then known as Brandon Nitro, began to use his given name of Gatson and became Brandon "Nitro" Gatson and set his sights of the top prize in the EWF, the Heavyweight Championship.

==== Pursuit of the EWF Heavyweight Championship (2007) ====
Brandon "Nitro" Gatson began to chase the EWF Heavyweight Championship in the Fall of 2007. He quickly ascended the Heavyweight rankings and finished in the top 5 of the Inland Title Series Battle Royal, earning him a berth in the annual Inland Title Series, a round robin style tournament, against Scorpio Sky, Ryan Taylor and Blackstar. The winner of the tournament would become the #1 contender for the EWF Heavyweight Title. Gatson finished the ITS tied for first with Scorpio Sky and the two would meet in an epic tie-breaker match at The Fight Before Christmas. Gatson would then go on to meet Bino Gambino on January 13, 2008 at Return to the Hudson and became the EWF Heavyweight Champion. He lost the title to Ryan Taylor on October 30, 2009. On July 6, 2012, he was defeated by Joey Ryan for the vacant EWF Heavyweight Championship. He defeated Ryan for the title on December 7, 2012.

==== Defending the title and Scorpio Sky (2007–2009) ====
Brandon "Nitro" Gatson quickly gained a reputation as a fighting champion, taking on anyone and everyone and becoming a fan favorite. At the same time Gatson was earning his reputation, Scorpio Sky, the runner-up in the 2007 ITS was earning his own devoted following and quickly rose up the Heavyweight rankings. Sky and Gatson teamed together on several occasions and developed mutual respect and friendship. Scorpio Sky then earned a shot at Gatson's Heavyweight Title after defeating Dan "The Man" Kobrick and Terex in a #1 contender's three-way dance. After the match, Gatson went out to congratulate Sky and then leveled him with a superkick. Their match at the 12th Anniversary Extravaganza was one of the most hyped matches in the history of the EWF and helped the rare distinction of being scheduled for 2 out of 3 falls. In another match of the year candidate, Scorpio Sky went on the defeat Gatson 2 falls to 1, and become the EWF Heavyweight Champion.

==== Feuds with Mikey Nicholls and Black Metal (2009) ====
After losing the Heavyweight Title, Gatson dropped the "Nitro" nickname and feuded with Mikey Nicholls. During their Last Man Standing match at Excessive Force 2. Nicholls hit Gatson over the head five times with a steel chair, which resulted in a hairline skull fracture and cost Gatson a month of his career. Gatson would have the last laugh however by defeating Nicholls, Joey Ryan and Sonny Samson in a match for the vacant EWF Heavyweight Title at August's Red Hot Summer show. On October 24, 2009, Gatson defeated Sky in the finals on an eight-man tournament to win the vacant NWA Arizona Heavyweight Championship. Six days later he would drop the EWF Heavyweight Title to Ryan Taylor.

=== WWE (2007) ===
On July 30, 2007, Gatson made his WWE debut on Monday Night Raw teaming with John Mason in a losing effort against Cryme Tyme (JTG & Shad). The following day, Gatson appeared on ECW on Sci-Fi where he teamed again with Mason along with Jeff Michaels as they were defeated by Big Daddy V in a 3-on-1 handicap match. On November 5, Gatson made his final appearance for WWE at a Heat taping where he was defeated by Vladimir Kozlov in a dark match.

=== Pro Wrestling Guerrilla (2009–2010) ===
On July 31, 2009, at Threemendous II Gatson made his debut for Pro Wrestling Guerrilla in a match where he teamed up with Jerome Robinson and Johnny Goodtime in a losing effort against Charles Mercury and Brandon and Dustin Cutler. On October 2 at Against the Grain Gatson defeated Goodtime, Brandon Cutler and Malachi Jackson in a four-way match to earn a spot in the 2009 Battle of Los Angeles for the vacant PWG World Championship. In the tournament, held November 20 and 21, Gatson defeated Nick Jackson and Alex Shelley to advance to the semifinals, where he was defeated by Roderick Strong. On January 30, 2010, at Kurt Russellmania, Gatson, billed as the PWG breakout star of 2009, defeated Brandon Bonham, the breakout star of 2008, in a singles match. In the 2010 Battle of Los Angeles, Gatson once again made it to the semifinals, after defeating Ryan Taylor and Brandon Bonham, but was there defeated by Chris Hero.

When Davey Richards was after the tournament stripped of the PWG World Championship, Gatson and the three other Battle of Los Angeles semifinalists, Chris Hero, Claudio Castagnoli and Joey Ryan, were placed in a four-way match to determine a new champion. On October 9, 2010, at The Curse of Guerrilla Island, Gatson was defeated in his first PWG World Championship match by Claudio Castagnoli.

== Championships and accomplishments ==
- Empire Wrestling Federation
  - EWF American Championship (1 time)
  - EWF Heavyweight Championship (4 times)
  - EWF Tag Team Championship (1 time) - with Johnny Dynamite
  - Inland Title Series (2007)
- National Wrestling Alliance
  - NWA Arizona Heavyweight Championship (1 time)
  - NWA Arizona Tag Team Championship (1 time) - with Johnny Dynamite
- Pro Wrestling Illustrated
  - PWI ranked him #359 of the top 500 wrestlers in the PWI 500 in 2012
- West Coast Wrestling Company
  - WCWC Wild Card Championship (1 time, current)
