= WrestleReunion =

Wrestling event and convention

- Founded: 2005
- Defunct: 2012 (last event)
- Style: Professional wrestling
- Headquarters: United States
- Founder: Sal Corrente
- Website: http://www.wrestlereunion.com

WrestleReunion (or Wrestle Reunion) was a professional wrestling event, and fan convention, founded by Sal Corrente in 2005.

== WrestleReunion 1 ==
The first WrestleReunion event occurred January 29, 2005, at Doubletree Hotel in Tampa, Florida. The attendance was 450.

Appearing at the convention were: Bill Alfonso, Bill Apter, Nick Bockwinkel, Jack Brisco, Buddy Colt, Ted DiBiase, Hector Guerrero, Jimmy Hart, Scott Hudson, Lex Luger, Kevin Nash, Diamond Dallas Page, Kimberly Page, Tom Prichard, Harley Race, Scotty Riggs, Lance Russell, Sabu, Bruno Sammartino, Nitro Girl Spice, Ricky Steamboat, Les Thatcher, Bill Watts, Jake Roberts and Steve Williams.

No.	Results	Stipulations	Times
1	Roddy Piper, Jimmy Snuka^{1} and Jimmy Valiant defeated Colonel DeBeers, Buddy Rose and Bob Orton, Jr. (with Sherri Martel)	Six-man tag team match	—
2	Lanny Poffo defeated Adam Windsor (with Dory Funk, Jr.)	Singles match	—
3	The Missing Link defeated George South	Singles match	02:30
4	Wendi Richter, Bambi, Malia Hosaka and Jenny Taylor defeated Sherri Martel, Peggy Lee Leather and Team Blondage (Amber and Krissy) (with Joyce Grable)	Six-woman tag team match	—
5	Jim Duggan defeated Kamala	Singles match	05:14
6	Ron Bass and Larry Zbyszko defeated The U.S. Express (Barry Windham and Mike Rotunda)	Tag team match	06:50
7	The Masked Superstar defeated The Grappler	Mask vs. Mask match	05:25
8	America's Most Wanted (Chris Harris and James Storm) (c) defeated Terry Funk and Dory Funk, Jr. by disqualification	Tag team match for the NWA World Tag Team Championship	10:10
9	Marty Jannetty defeated Gary Royal	Singles match	09:00
10	Greg Valentine won by last eliminating Norman Smiley^{2}	Battle Royal for the IWA Heavyweight Championship	08:15
11	The Rock 'n' Roll Express (Ricky Morton and Robert Gibson) and The Fantastics (Bobby Fulton and Tommy Rogers) (with Bobby Heenan) defeated The Midnight Express (Bobby Eaton, Dennis Condrey, Stan Lane and Jim Cornette)	Eight-man tag team match	15:00
12	Christopher Daniels defeated Pat Tanaka	Singles match	06:25
13	Jeff Jarrett (c) (with Baby Doll) defeated Tully Blanchard (with J. J. Dillon)	Singles match for the NWA World Heavyweight Championship with Kevin Von Erich as special guest referee	07:45
14	Dusty Rhodes, Dustin Rhodes and Mike Graham (with Harley Race) defeated CM Punk, Abdullah the Butcher and Kevin Sullivan (with Sir Oliver Humperdink and Honest John Cheatem)	Six-man tag team match with Mick Foley as special guest referee	7:30
(c) / – the champion(s) heading into the match

1. Rocky Johnson was scheduled to be the partner for Roddy Piper and Jimmy Valiant, but was replaced by Jimmy Snuka.
2. Other participants in battle royal: Bob Armstrong, Ronnie Garvin, Brad Armstrong, Jake Roberts, Shane Douglas, Virgil, Thunderfoot #2, Thunderfoot #1, Hack Meyers, Samu, Scott Armstrong, Adrian Street, Chavo Guerrero, The Warlord, and Bugsy McGraw

== WrestleReunion 2 ==
The event was dedicated to Bruno Sammartino.

WrestleReunion 2 took place from August 26–28, 2005, at the Valley Forge Convention Center in Philadelphia, Pennsylvania. The attendance was 900.

Appearing at the convention were: Afa, Bill Apter, Nick Bockwinkel, Jeremy Borash, J. J. Dillon, Stan Hansen, Bret Hart, Jimmy Hart, Ivory, Balls Mahoney, Jim Molineaux, Tom Prichard, Harley Race, Wendi Richter, Lance Russell, Sumi Sakai, Sandman, Larry Sharpe, Joey Styles, Tammy Lynn Sytch, Nikolai Volkoff, and Dick Whoerle.

No.	Results	Stipulations
1	Don Muraco and Joe Muraco defeated Bob Armstrong and Brad Armstrong	Tag team match
2	Wendi Richter, The Patriot and George South Jr. defeated D. C. Drake, Gary Royal and Amy Love	Six-man tag team match
3	Ivan Koloff (with Nikolai Volkoff) defeated Dominic DeNucci	Russian Chain Match
4	The Fantastics (Bobby Fulton and Tommy Rogers) defeated The Thunderfeet (#1 and #2), The Backseat Boyz (Trent Acid and Johnny Kashmere) and The Samoan Island Tribe (Samu and L.A. Smooth)	Four Corners Tag Team match
5	Larry Zbyszko defeated Diamond Dallas Page (with Bruno Sammartino)	Singles match
6	Tom Prichard, D'Lo Brown, The Blue Meanie and Dusty Rhodes defeated The Masked Superstar, Andrew Martin, The Original Evil Clown and Steve Corino	Eight-man tag team match
7	Steve Williams defeated King Kaluha	Singles match
8	Tito Santana defeated Greg Valentine (c)	Singles match for the IWA Heavyweight Championship
9	The Midnight Express (Bobby Eaton, Dennis Condrey, and Stan Lane) (with Jim Cornette) defeated Mick Foley, Dory Funk Jr, and Terry Funk (with Bobby Heenan)	Six-man tag team match
10	Team 3D (Brother Ray and Brother Devon) defeated Rhino and Matt Hardy (with Talia)	Tag team match
(c) / – the champion(s) heading into the match

== WrestleReunion 3 ==
WrestleReunion 3 took place on September 10, 2005, at The Davie Bergeron Rodeo Arena in Davie, Florida. The attendance was 550.

=== When Legends Collide ===
No.	Results	Stipulations
1	David Isley defeated Hack Myers	Singles match
2	Sumie Sakai defeated Amy Love	Singles match
3	Bugsy McGraw defeated The Warlord	Singles match
4	Mike Graham defeated Kevin Sullivan	Singles match
5	The Blue Meanie defeated Kamala	Singles match
6	Jake Roberts defeated Antonio Banks aka MVP	Singles match
7	Greg Valentine defeated Tito Santana (c)	Singles match for the IWA Heavyweight Championship
8	Tully Blanchard defeated Ron Bass	Singles match
9	Team 3D (Brother Ray and Brother Devon) defeated The Midnight Express (Dennis Condrey and Bobby Eaton)	Tag team match
10	Dusty Rhodes vs. Terry Funk ended in a no contest	Singles match, Mick Foley was the referee
(c) / – the champion(s) heading into the match

== WrestleReunion 4 ==
WrestleReunion 4 took place from January 29 to 31, 2010, at the LAX Hilton in Los Angeles, California.

Appearing at the convention were: Austin Idol, Bruno Sammartino, Demolition, Diamond Dallas Page, Jushin Thunder Liger, Koko B. Ware, Larry Zbyszko, The Great Muta, Nick Bockwinkel, Road Warrior Animal, Rob Van Dam, Scott Taylor, Stan Hansen, Tammy Lynn Sytch, Super Crazy, Terri Runnels, Bret Hart, Chavo Guerrero, Dan Severn, Daffney, Jimmy Hart, J. J. Dillon, Ron Simmons, Kishi, Rock Riddle, The Iron Sheik.

=== SoCal Showdown ===
Presented by Ring of Honor on January 29, 2010

No.	Results	Stipulations
1	Colt Cabana and El Generico defeated Scott Lost and Scorpio Sky	Tag team match
2	Necro Butcher defeated Erick Stevens	Anything goes match
3	Roderick Strong defeated Delirious	Singles match
4	Tyler Black defeated Joey Ryan	Singles match
5	Kenny King defeated Jerry Lynn	Singles match
6	Larry Zbyszko defeated Scott Taylor	Singles match with Jonny Fairplay as special guest referee
7	Kevin Steen defeated Human Tornado	Singles match
8	Austin Aries defeated Jushin Thunder Liger	Singles match
9	The American Wolves (Davey Richards and Eddie Edwards) and The Kings of Wrestling (Chris Hero and Claudio Castagnoli) defeated The Briscoe Brothers (Jay Briscoe and Mark Briscoe) and The Young Bucks (Matt Jackson and Nick Jackson)	8-Man Tag Team War

=== Kurt RusselReunion ===
Presented by Pro Wrestling Guerrilla on January 30, 2010. This event aired on pay-per-view.

No.	Results	Stipulations
1	The Cutler Brothers, Ryan Taylor, & Christina Von Eerie defeated Johnny Goodtime, Malachi Jackson, Candice LeRae, & Jerome Robinson	Eight-person tag team match
2	Brandon Gatson defeated Brandon Bonham	Singles match
3	Human Tornado defeated Super Crazy	Singles match
4	Davey Richards defeated Kevin Steen	Singles match
5	The Great Muta and KAI defeated Scott Lost and Joey Ryan	Tag team match
6	Jushin Thunder Liger defeated El Generico	Singles match
7	Paul London and Brian Kendrick defeated Generation Me (Jeremy and Max)	Tag team match
8	Rob Van Dam defeated Roderick Strong and Chris Hero	Three-way match

== WrestleReunion 5 ==
WrestleReunion 5 took place from January 28 to 30, 2011, at the LAX Hilton in Los Angeles, California.

Appearing at the convention are: Mike Graham, Paul Orndorff, Tito Santana, Mr. Saito, Mr. Fuji, Bob Orton Jr, SoCal Val, Traci Brooks, Ryan Shamrock, Terry Funk, Ken Patera, Tatanka, Savio Vega, Val Venis, Gene Okerlund, Barry Orton, Roddy Piper, Tammy Lynn Sytch, Serena Deeb, Shane Douglas, The Powers of Pain (The Barbarian and The Warlord), Billy Anderson, Torrie Wilson, Nick Mitchell, Superstar Billy Graham, Hart Foundation (Bret Hart, Jim Neidhart, Jimmy Hart), Danny Davis, Vampiro, Christy Hemme, Hurricane Helms, Mr. Águila, Mil Mascaras, Dos Caras, Jake Roberts, Chavo Guerrero, Mando Guerrero, Harley Race

=== SoCal Showdown II ===
Presented by Ring of Honor on January 28, 2011:

No.	Results	Stipulations
1	The Bravado Brothers (Harlem Bravado and Lance Bravado) defeated Cedric Alexander and Caleb Konley	Tag team match
2	Jay Briscoe defeated Colt Cabana	Singles match
3	The All-Night Express (Kenny King and Rhett Titus) defeated the Cutler Brothers (Brandon and Dustin Cutler)	Tag team match
4	Davey Richards defeated T. J. Perkins	Singles match
5	Christopher Daniels (c) (with Allison Danger) defeated Mark Briscoe	Singles match for the ROH World Television Championship
6	Wrestling's Greatest Tag Team (Charlie Haas and Shelton Benjamin) defeated The Kings of Wrestling (Chris Hero and Claudio Castagnoli)	Tag team match
7	Roderick Strong (c) defeated El Generico	Singles match for the ROH World Championship
(c) / – the champion(s) heading into the match

=== Kurt RussellReunion II: The Reunioning ===
Presented by Pro Wrestling Guerrilla on January 29, 2011:

No.	Results	Stipulations
1	Brandon Gatson, Cedric Alexander, Candice LeRae and Willie Mack defeated Caleb Konley, ODB, Jake Manning and Peter Avalon	Eight-person tag team match
2	Mr. Águila defeated Rey Bucanero	Singles match
3	Joey Ryan defeated Shane Helms	Singles match
4	Low Ki defeated Davey Richards	Singles match
5	Jake Roberts defeated Sinn Bodhi (with Stacy Carter)	Jake "The Snake" Roberts retirement match
6	Roddy Piper won by last eliminating Terry Funk	Legends Battle Royal (Note: The other participants were: The Barbarian, Barry Orton, Bob Orton, Jr., Chavo Guerrero, Cruel Connection, Danny Davis, Jimmy Hart, Ken Patera, Mando Guerrero, Mike Graham, Rock Riddle, Savio Vega, Sean Morley, Shane Douglas, Tatanka, Tito Santana, Vampiro, The Warlord)
7	Chris Hero defeated Kevin Steen	Singles match
8	The RockNES Monsters (Johnny Goodtime and Johnny Yuma) defeated the Cutler Brothers (Brandon and Dustin Cutler), The Fightin' Taylor Boys (Brian Cage-Taylor and Ryan Taylor) and The Young Bucks (Matt Jackson and Nick Jackson)	Four way DDT4 qualifying match
9	Claudio Castagnoli (c) defeated El Generico	Singles match for the PWG World Championship
(c) / – the champion(s) heading into the match

== WrestleReunion VI ==
WrestleReunion VI took place from January 27 to 29, 2012 at the LAX Westin Hotel in Los Angeles, California. In addition to the autograph signings, live events were held by Dragon Gate USA, Pro Wrestling Guerrilla and Highspots.com, as well as "$5 Wrestling Live".

=== Open the Golden Gate ===
Presented by Dragon Gate USA on January 27, 2012:

No.	Results	Stipulations
1	Low Ki defeated BxB Hulk	Singles match
2	The Young Bucks (Matt Jackson and Nick Jackson) defeated Chuck Taylor and Scorpio Sky	Tag team match
3	Masato Yoshino defeated Naruki Doi	Singles match
4	Sami Callihan defeated A. R. Fox	Tables match
5	Jon Davis defeated Caleb Konley	Singles match
6	Akira Tozawa defeated PAC	Singles match
7	Blood Warriors (CIMA and Ricochet) (c) defeated Junction Three (Jimmy Susumu and Masaaki Mochizuki)	Tag team match for the Open the United Gate Championship
(c) / – the champion(s) heading into the match

=== Pro Wrestling Superstars ===
Presented by Highspots.com and WrestleReunion on January 28, 2012:

No.	Results	Stipulations
1	Adam Page vs. Arik Royal ended in a no contest	Singles match
2	The New Age Outlaws (B.G. James and Kip James) defeated the Steiner Brothers (Rick Steiner and Scott Steiner)	Tag team match with guest referee Mick Foley
3	Fit Finlay defeated Colt Cabana	World of Sports Rules match
4	Unholy Alliance (Mikey Whipwreck and Yoshihiro Tajiri) defeated 7OH!4 (Cedric Alexander and Caleb Konley)	Tag team match
5	Mascarita Dorada defeated DEMUS 316	Singles match
6	Kevin Steen defeated Tommy Dreamer	Los Angeles Street Fight
7	Roderick Strong defeated Jake Manning	Singles match
8	Davey Richards defeated Harry Smith	Singles match
9	Great Sasuke and El Generico defeated The Young Bucks (Matt Jackson and Nick Jackson)	Tag team match
10	The Godfather won by last eliminating Brutus Beefcake	Legends Battle Royal (Note: The other participants were: Bradley Ray Schreck, Carlos Colon, Dan Severn, Gangrel, Greg Valentine, Jesse Hernandez, Jimmy Hart, Kevin Sullivan, Konnan, Lanny Poffo, Mando Guerrero, Matt Classic, Piloto Suicida, Raven, Robbie E, Rock Riddle, Tommy Dreamer and Virgil)

=== Kurt RussellReunion III ===
Presented by Pro Wrestling Guerrilla on January 29, 2012:

No.	Results	Stipulations
1	The Fightin' Taylor Boys (Brian Cage-Taylor and Ryan Taylor) defeated Chris Kadillak and Famous B	Tag team match
2	Jimmy Susumu defeated BxB Hulk	Singles match
3	The Young Bucks (Matt Jackson and Nick Jackson) defeated Davey Richards and Harry Smith	Tag team match
4	Willie Mack defeated Naruki Doi	Singles match
5	B-Boy, Candice LeRae, Cedric Alexander and Mascarita Dorada defeated Joey Ryan, Peter Avalon, Ray Rosas and DEMUS 316	Eight-person tag team match
6	The RockNES Monsters (Johnny Goodtime and Johnny Yuma) defeated Blood Warriors (CIMA and Ricochet)	Tag team match
7	Masaaki Mochizuki defeated Roderick Strong	Singles match
8	El Generico, PAC and Masato Yoshino defeated Kevin Steen, Super Dragon and Akira Tozawa	Six-man tag team match

== See also ==
- List of professional wrestling conventions
- Pro Wrestling Guerrilla
- Ring of Honor
- World Wrestling Legends
- World Xtreme Wrestling
