= David Flex =

American professional wrestler

David McCallion
Personal information
- Born: David McCallion; December 3, 1987 (age 38) Philadelphia, Pennsylvania
- Website: https://www.facebook.com/davidflex

Professional wrestling career
- Ring name(s): David Frazier
- Billed height: 5 ft 8 in (1.73 m)
- Billed weight: 195 lb (88 kg)
- Billed from: Gainz Pasture
- Trained by: Jesse Hernandez; Joey Ryan
- Debut: 2009

David McCallion (born December 3, 1987) is an American professional wrestler, who wrestles under the name Flex McCallion on the west coast independent wrestling scene.

== Professional Wrestling career ==
=== The Beginning ===
Originally from Philadelphia PA (born) and later moved to Southern California to be trained by Jesse Hernandez(EWF) & Joey Ryan(M1W) and wrestle shows for companies such as National Wrestling Alliance, Empire Wrestling Fed, Alternative Wrestling Solution, New Wave Pro, & Mach 1 Wrestling. He also has wrestled up north in Oregon for West Coast Wrestling Connection.

Flex started as a heel wrestling character. He later became a more flamboyant character. Flex was mainly used as a filler heel character but later got over with the crowd.

=== Wrestling Journey ===
Flex made his debut on October 2 for EWF in wrestling another independent wrestler who was making their debut in one Gregory Sharpe. In this encounter Flex went over Sharpe with a roll-up with the tights signifying that Flex wasn't going to be playing by the rules. The very next day Flex had tagged with Brandon Parker at Mach1Wrestling's “Wrath of Con 2009” at the Long Beach Convention Center for the largely known Comic Con Event. In this encounter Flex would take his first lose in the ring getting pinned by visiting Australian Kiel Steria with a Yakuza Kick busting Flex wide open. Flex would go on to sparsely work for EWF but never develop an actual feud with any one star in particularwrestling opponents such as Sonny Samson, Vizzion and at the current time EWF Cruiserweight champion Chris Kadillak.

Flex wrestled at California's big joint promotion “EWF & AWS United Forces 2” wrestling Brandon Gatson and coming up short in a lackluster performance to Gatson's twiltawhirl flapjack finisher. That was Flex's last time competing for EWF. Flex then flew to Oregon for a few trips to wrestle in the West Coast Wrestling Connection having a short lived feud with Patrick Large of the Painfully Large tag tandem. Flex was managed by then local Oregon wrestler/manager Brian Zane who helped Flex get under the Ore-o-gon fans skin! Flex had wrestled a few shows for the NWA in Phoenix AZ with which he was billed by NWA branded name David Frazier or David “Flex” Frazier.

Flex had his most exhibitions in the Anaheim, CA based promotion an affiliate of NWA Mach1Wrestling in which he competed against the likes of many M1W and NWA rising stars. In Flex's most recent stint with the organization he had wrestled Jason Watts, Peter Avalon along with wrestling against Brandon Parker, but currently is not doing shows with the promotion.
