= Karl Anderson =

American professional wrestler (born 1980)

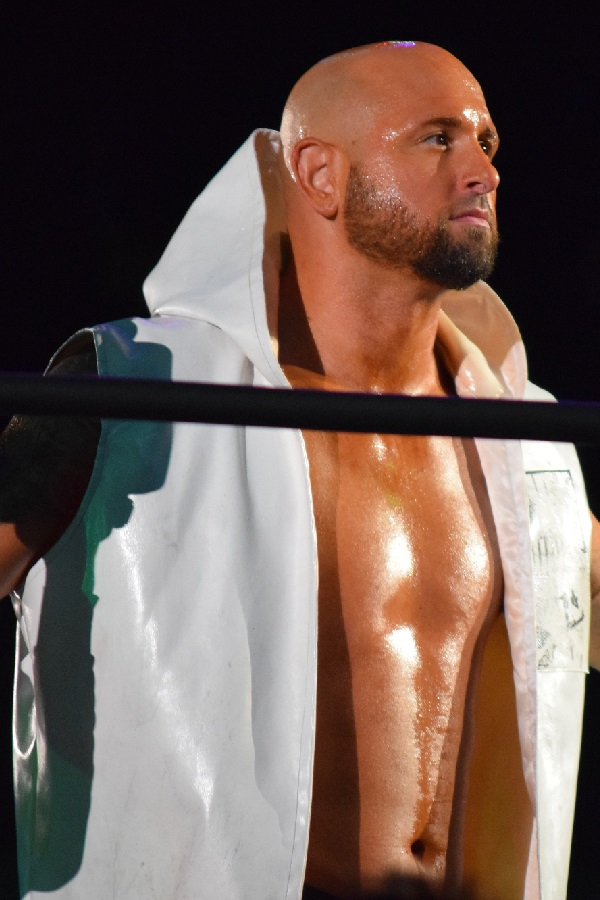
- Anderson in 2016

Personal information
- Born: Chad Allegra; January 20, 1980 (age 46) Lincoln Park, Michigan, U.S.
- Education: Mars Hill College
- Spouse: Christine Bui
- Children: 5

Professional wrestling career
- Ring name(s): Chad 2 Badd; Chad Allegra; Karl Anderson; Killshot
- Billed height: 6 ft 1 in (185 cm)
- Billed weight: 215 lb (98 kg)
- Billed from: Tokyo, Japan by way of Cincinnati, Ohio
- Trained by: Les Thatcher; Roger Ruffen; Inoki Dojo
- Debut: May 10, 2002

Chad Allegra (born January 20, 1980), known by his ring name Karl Anderson, is an American professional wrestler. He is known for his tenures in New Japan Pro-Wrestling (NJPW), WWE and Impact Wrestling.

Anderson is known for his work as a tag team specialist, having become a four-time IWGP Tag Team Champion. He also holds the record for the longest reign and most defenses with the title, achieved on his first reign with former partner Giant Bernard. Anderson and Bernard also held Pro Wrestling Noah's GHC Tag Team Championship, and were voted tag team of the year by the Wrestling Observer Newsletter in 2011. Anderson is a founding member and mouthpiece of the Bullet Club stable, and a three-time winner of NJPW's top tag team tournament, the G1/World Tag League, having won it in 2009 with Bernard, in 2012 with Hirooki Goto, and in 2013 with Doc Gallows. He also wrestled for Southern California–based independent promotion Pro Wrestling Guerrilla (PWG) between 2007 and 2009.

Anderson spent the majority of his career in Japan, before signing with WWE alongside Gallows, A.J. Styles, and Shinsuke Nakamura in 2016. During his first run in WWE, Anderson and Gallows won the WWE Raw Tag Team Championship twice. In April 2020, Anderson and Gallows were released by WWE and, three months later, signed a contract with Impact Wrestling, where they became three-time Impact World Tag Team Champions. Their contracts with Impact expired in 2022, and that same year, Anderson won NJPW's NEVER Openweight Championship, and, while still champion, he and Gallows returned to WWE in October 2022. At Wrestle Kingdom 17 on January 4, 2023, Anderson became the first WWE contracted wrestler to perform at NJPW's marquee event where he lost the title.

== Early life ==
Allegra grew up in Pipestone, Minnesota, with his younger brother and mother. Allegra received a baseball scholarship to study at Mars Hill College in his home state before dropping out to pursue a wrestling career. Upon moving to Cincinnati, Ohio, he began training for a short time at Les Thatcher's Main Event Pro Wrestling Camp, the school associated with the Heartland Wrestling Association (HWA).

== Professional wrestling career ==
=== Early career (2000–2005) ===
Shortly after beginning his training under Les Thatcher in 2000, he received a concussion at the hands of fellow trainee Derek Neikirk, which put Allegra on the shelf for over a year. When he felt he was able to return, he contacted Kirk Sheppard who worked for the Northern Wrestling Federation (NWF) in Cincinnati, who introduced him to Roger Ruffen, the head trainer at BoneKrushers (the NWF's wrestling school). Allegra trained for several months before debuting under his real name in his first professional match on May 10, 2002, in a loss with The Zodiac. In the early stages on his career, he had matches with Prince Justice, Jimmy Valiant, Chris Harris, Shark Boy, and Jerry Lawler. In the NWF, Allegra started as part of the Young Lions, a four-man group of popular rookies who entered the promotion around the same time. First to leave the group was Matt Parks. Allegra eventually joined Parks as a heel and began a feud with Ryan Stone and Jay Donaldson. In the summer of 2005, the NWF and the HWA began an interpromotional feud. It culminated in a one on one, title vs. title match between Allegra, the NWF Champion, and Cody Hawk, the HWA champion.

=== National Wrestling Alliance (2005–2008) ===
In October 2005, Allegra had the opportunity to wrestle at the National Wrestling Alliance's (NWA) annual convention, where he was noticed by Dave Marquez of NJPW LA Dojo. Allegra was invited to train at the dojo and so after losing the NWF title to Ryan Stone on January 1, 2006, Allegra began living and wrestling on the West Coast. On the West Coast, Allegra was repackaged as "Machine Gun" Karl Anderson, becoming a storyline member of the Anderson wrestling family and adopting the family's trademark spinebuster as his new finishing maneuver. Over the years, the association with the Anderson family has quietly been dropped. Before long, he won the NWA British Commonwealth Championship before losing it to Alex Koslov.

In 2007, he began teaming with Joey Ryan, on NWA cards promoted by David Marquez. He appeared weekly on MavTV, a small broadcast network, carried on limited stations. The team's first title match came against The Young Bucks (Matt and Nick Jackson) in a losing attempt for the AWS Tag Team Championship. In April, Anderson won the EWF American Championship from Human Tornado. On July 8, 2007, he and Ryan won a 3-way tag match to claim the vacant NWA World Tag Team Championship. Anderson lost his EWF American Championship to Mikey Nicholls on September 7, 2007, in a 30-minute Iron Man match, which also included Ryan Taylor. Anderson and Ryan, now going as the Real American Heroes, successfully defend their championship on multiple occasions, but would eventually lose it to Los Luchas (Phoenix Star and Zokre) on February 10, 2008.

=== Pro Wrestling Guerilla (2007–2009) ===
In early 2007, Anderson debuted for Pro Wrestling Guerrilla (PWG), picking up big wins over established wrestlers such as Frankie Kazarian and Colt Cabana. He would continue to appear for PWG over the year, occasionally teaming with Joey Ryan's Dynasty faction. On February 24, 2008, he participated in a tournament for the PWG World Championship, defeating Kazarian in his first round match. Later that same day, he was defeated by Human Tornado in the final of the tournament, which also included Roderick Strong. After an eleven-month break from PWG, Anderson returned on February 21, 2009, once again teaming with The Dynasty. On August 28, he and Joey Ryan unsuccessfully challenged The Young Bucks for the PWG World Tag Team Championship. Anderson made his final appearance for PWG on September 4, 2009, when he was defeated by Roderick Strong. In 2013, looking back at his time on the Californian independent circuit, Allegra stated "I actually hated my whole time in L.A. There were always great times, but I look back on it now, and I wasn't happy there at all. I just didn't enjoy myself". He has however noted that he did not hate PWG, saying that they treated him well and gave him an opportunity when no one else would.

=== Ring of Honor (2007, 2013) ===
On October 19, 2007, Anderson made his debut for Ring of Honor (ROH), losing to Chris Hero in a Survival of the Fittest qualifying match. Two days later, Anderson was defeated by Adam Pearce in a singles match. After not appearing for ROH in over five years, Anderson returned to the promotion on April 5, 2013, at Supercard of Honor VII, defeating Roderick Strong. At the following day's tapings of Ring of Honor Wrestling, Anderson picked up another win over Michael Elgin. Anderson returned to the promotion on July 27 to take part in the ROH World Championship tournament, defeating A. C. H. in his first round match. On August 17, Anderson was eliminated from the tournament in the quarterfinals by Michael Elgin.

=== New Japan Pro-Wrestling (2008–2016) ===
==== Bad Intentions (2008–2012) ====
As part of the new talent exchange agreement between the NWA and NJPW, Anderson replaced Yuji Nagata on March 23, 2008, in the annual New Japan Cup tournament. His opponent in the first round was New Japan's junior heavyweight division ace, Koji Kanemoto, to whom Anderson lost by submission. Based on his performance, Anderson was signed to a one-year contract by NJPW. Anderson then joined NJPW's top heel stable Great Bash Heel (GBH) and spent the rest of the year wrestling in midcard matches. After a jump from GBH to Chaos, Anderson formed the tag team Bad Intentions with Giant Bernard and on June 20 the two of them challenged for the IWGP Tag Team Championship, but were unable to defeat the defending champions Team 3D (Brother Ray and Brother Devon). Anderson and Bernard entered the 2009 G1 Tag League and defeated Apollo 55 (Prince Devitt and Ryusuke Taguchi) in the final to win the tournament and earn another chance for the title. On November 8 at Destruction '09, the second match between Bad Intentions and Team 3D ended in a double countout. On April 4, 2010, Chaos members Toru Yano and Takashi Iizuka turned on Anderson and kicked him out of the stable with help from Tetsuya Naito and Yujiro Takahashi, who joined the stable in the process. Giant Bernard, who was not present at the show, ended up leaving Chaos alongside his tag team partner. On June 19, 2010, at Dominion 6.19, Anderson and Bernard defeated the teams of Seigigun (Yuji Nagata and Wataru Inoue) and No Limit (Tetsuya Naito and Yujiro Takahashi) in a three-way elimination match to win the IWGP Tag Team Championship.

Bad Intentions made their first successful defense of the IWGP Tag Team Championship on July 19, defeating Seigigun and No Limit in a three-way "Dogfight". In late October Bad Intentions entered the 2010 G1 Tag League, where, after three wins and two losses, they finished second in their block and advanced to the semifinals. On November 7, they were defeated by the eventual winners of the tournament, Yuji Nagata and Wataru Inoue. On January 4, 2011, at Wrestle Kingdom V in Tokyo Dome, Bad Intentions successfully defended the IWGP Tag Team Championship in a three–way match against Beer Money, Inc. (James Storm and Robert Roode) and Muscle Orchestra (Manabu Nakanishi and Strong Man). On May 3, Bad Intentions defeated No Limit to make their seventh successful IWGP Tag Team Championship defense, tying the all-time record for most defenses, set by Hiroyoshi Tenzan and Masahiro Chono. Bad Intentions made their record breaking eight successful IWGP Tag Team Championship defense on June 18 at Dominion 6.18 against Pro Wrestling Noah's Takuma Sano and Yoshihiro Takayama, and in the process also became the new GHC Tag Team Champions.

Bad Intentions' ninth successful IWGP Tag Team Championship defense took place on July 3, when they defeated Hirooki Goto and IWGP Heavyweight Champion Hiroshi Tanahashi. On July 23, Bad Intentions made an appearance for Pro Wrestling Noah, making their first successful defense of the GHC Tag Team Championship against the team of Takeshi Morishima and Yutaka Yoshie. On September 9, Bad Intentions became the longest reigning IWGP Tag Team Champions by breaking the previous record of 446 days, set by Hiroyoshi Tenzan and Masahiro Chono in 2003. Bad Intentions made their second GHC Tag Team Championship defense on October 31, defeating Go Shiozaki and Shuhei Taniguchi at a Pro Wrestling Noah event. During New Japan's 2011 G1 Tag League, Bad Intentions suffered their first tag team loss in a year, when they were defeated by the Complete Players (Masato Tanaka and Yujiro Takahashi), but still managed to win their four other matches and advance to the semifinals of the tournament. On November 6, after defeating the Billion Powers (Hirooki Goto and Hiroshi Tanahashi) in the semifinals, Bad Intentions were defeated in the final of the 2011 G1 Climax by Suzuki-gun (Minoru Suzuki and Lance Archer). On November 12 at Power Struggle, Bad Intentions made their tenth successful IWGP Tag Team Championship defense against Archer and Suzuki. On January 4, 2012, at Wrestle Kingdom VI in Tokyo Dome, Bad Intentions lost the IWGP Tag Team Championship to Tencozy (Hiroyoshi Tenzan and Satoshi Kojima), ending their record-setting reign at 564 days. On January 22, Bad Intentions lost the GHC Tag Team Championship to Akitoshi Saito and Jun Akiyama. In March, Bad Intentions was disbanded, after Bernard left New Japan to return to WWE.

==== Bullet Club (2012–2016) ====
Launching his New Japan singles career, Anderson entered the 2012 New Japan Cup on April 1. After victories over Hiroyoshi Tenzan and multi-time IWGP Heavyweight Champion Shinsuke Nakamura, arguably the biggest win of his career, he was eliminated from the tournament in the semifinals by Hiroshi Tanahashi. On May 3 at Wrestling Dontaku 2012, Nakamura defeated Anderson in a rematch. In August, Anderson took part in the 2012 G1 Climax tournament, where he won four out of his first seven matches, before scoring an upset win over IWGP Heavyweight Champion Hiroshi Tanahashi on August 12, the final day of the tournament, to win his block and advance to the finals. In the final, which was held immediately after Anderson's win over Tanahashi, Anderson was defeated by Kazuchika Okada. During the following months, Anderson continued his feud with Okada, leading to him unsuccessfully challenging for Okada's Wrestle Kingdom 7 in Tokyo Dome title shot contract on October 8 at King of Pro-Wrestling. On November 11 at Power Struggle, Anderson unsuccessfully challenged Shinsuke Nakamura for the IWGP Intercontinental Championship. On November 15, Anderson entered a tournament to determine the inaugural NEVER Openweight Champion. After wins over Yujiro Takahashi, Shiori Asahi and Kengo Mashimo, Anderson was defeated in the finals of the tournament on November 19 by Masato Tanaka.

From November 20 to December 1, Anderson took part in the round-robin portion of the 2012 World Tag League, alongside Hirooki Goto under the team name "Sword & Guns". The team finished with a record of four wins and two losses, finishing second in their block and advancing to the semifinals of the tournament. On December 2, Sword & Guns defeated Tencozy to advance to the final of the tournament, where, later that same day, they defeated the reigning IWGP Tag Team Champions, K.E.S. (Davey Boy Smith Jr. and Lance Archer), to win the tournament. Sword & Guns received their shot at the IWGP Tag Team Championship on January 4, 2013, at Wrestle Kingdom 7 in Tokyo Dome, but were defeated in a rematch by K.E.S. Following his August 2012 win over Hiroshi Tanahashi, Anderson received his first shot at the IWGP Heavyweight Championship on February 10, 2013, at The New Beginning, but was defeated by Tanahashi in a rematch. In an attempt to earn another shot at Tanahashi, Anderson entered the 2013 New Japan Cup on March 11, defeating Hiroyoshi Tenzan in his first round match. Six days later, Anderson was eliminated from the tournament in the second round by Kazuchika Okada.

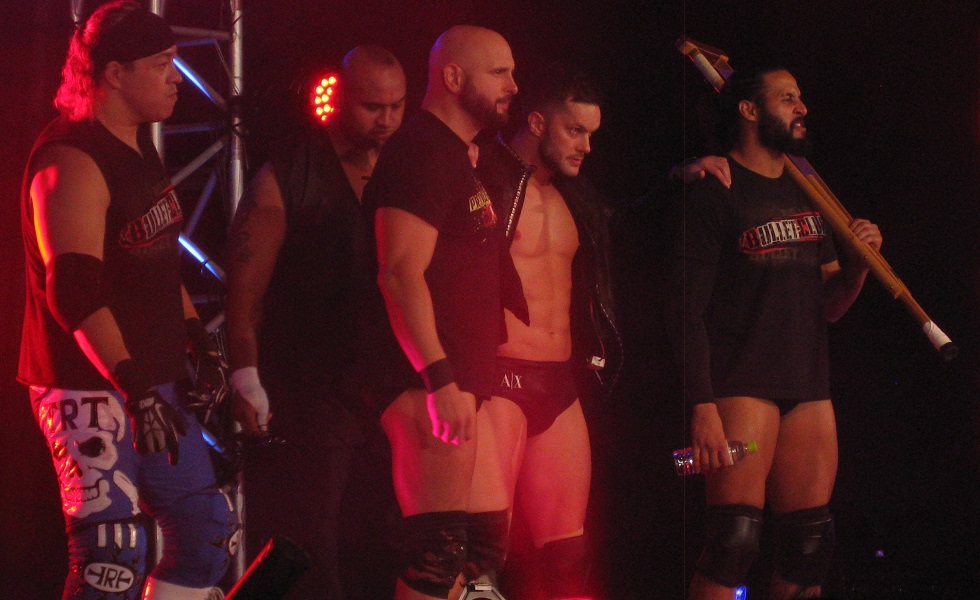
Anderson with Bullet Club in September 2013

On May 3 at Wrestling Dontaku 2013, Anderson faced Hiroshi Tanahashi in another high-profile match, but was again defeated. After the match, Anderson turned heel by joining Prince Devitt, Bad Luck Fale, and Tama Tonga in attacking Tanahashi. The new group was subsequently named "Bullet Club". From August 1 to 11, Anderson took part in the 2013 G1 Climax, where he finished with a record of five wins and four losses, with a loss against Tetsuya Naito on the final day costing him a spot in the final of the tournament. In October, Anderson set his sights on the IWGP Heavyweight Championship, held by Kazuchika Okada, looking to avenge his loss from the finals of the 2012 G1 Climax. The title match between the two took place on November 9 at Power Struggle and saw Okada retain his title. From November 24 to December 8, Anderson and Bullet Club's newest member, Doc Gallows, took part in the 2013 World Tag League. After winning their block with a record of four wins and two losses, Anderson and Gallows first defeated GBH (Togi Makabe and Tomoaki Honma) in the semifinals and then Tencozy in the final to win the tournament, giving Anderson his overall third G1/World Tag League win and the second in a row. Anderson and Gallows received their title shot on January 4, 2014, at Wrestle Kingdom 8 in Tokyo Dome, where they defeated K.E.S. to become the new IWGP Tag Team Champions. Anderson and Gallows made their first successful title defense on February 9 at The New Beginning in Hiroshima, defeating K.E.S. in a rematch. Their second defense took place on April 6 at Invasion Attack 2014, where they defeated Hirooki Goto and Katsuyori Shibata.

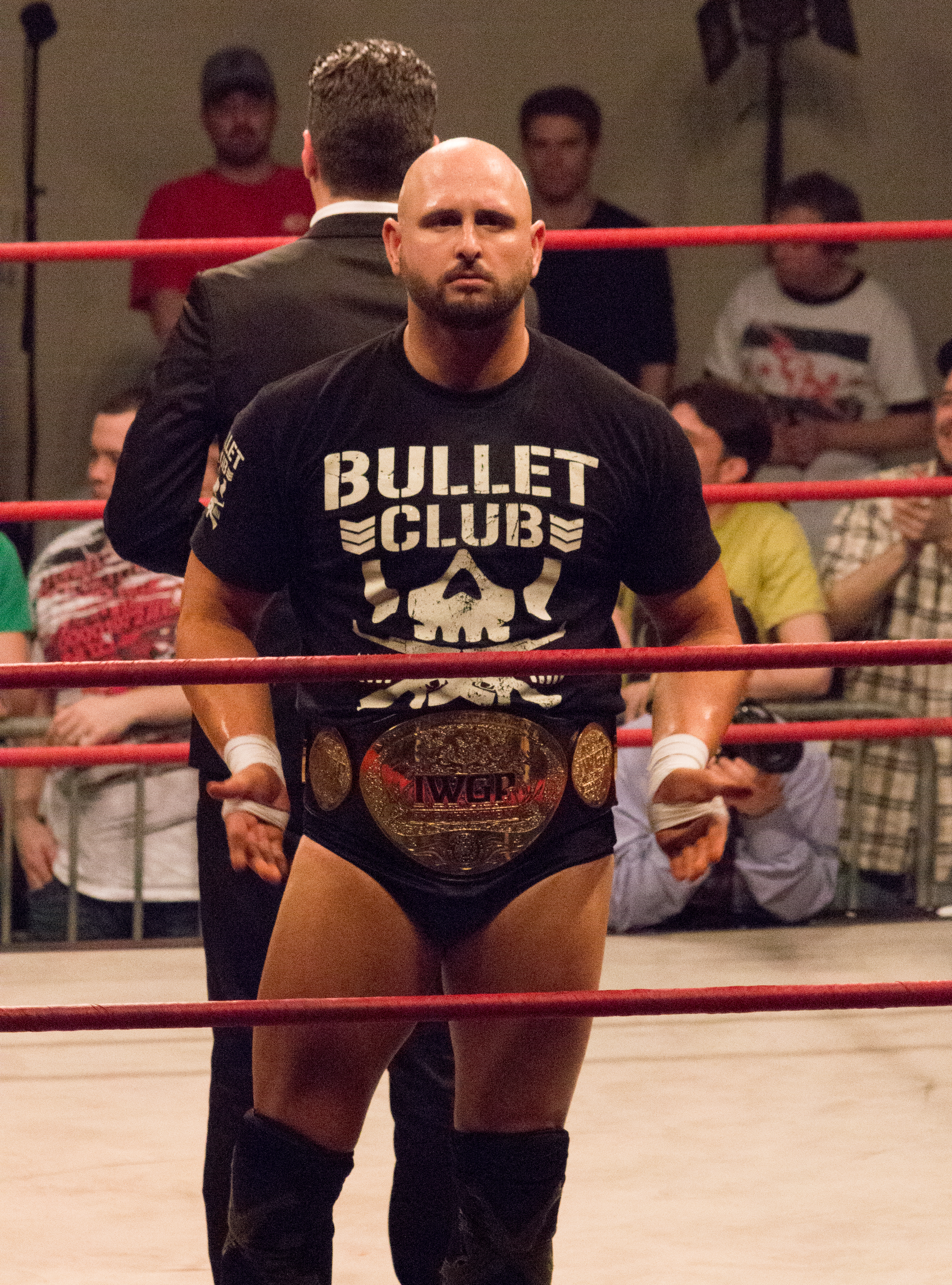
Anderson with the IWGP Tag Team Championship belt around his waist in May 2014

Anderson and Gallows' third successful defense took place just seven days later, during New Japan's trip to Taiwan, when they defeated Hirooki Goto and Captain Taiwan. On May 17, Anderson and Gallows made their fourth successful title defense against The Briscoes (Jay Briscoe and Mark Briscoe) at a NJPW and ROH co-produced event, War of the Worlds, in New York City. On June 21 at Dominion 6.21, Anderson and Gallows made their fifth successful defense against Ace to King (Hiroshi Tanahashi and Togi Makabe). From July 21 to August 8, Anderson took part in the 2014 G1 Climax, where he finished third in his block with a record of five wins and five losses. On September 21 at Destruction in Kobe, Anderson and Gallows made their sixth successful title defense against Chaos' Kazuchika Okada and Yoshi-Hashi. Two days later at Destruction in Okayama, Anderson unsuccessfully challenged Okada for his IWGP Heavyweight Championship number one contender's contract. In December, Anderson and Gallows made it to the finals of the 2014 World Tag League, after winning their block with a record of five wins and two losses. On December 7, Anderson and Gallows were defeated in the finals of the tournament by Hirooki Goto and Katsuyori Shibata. Anderson and Gallows' year-long reign as the IWGP Tag Team Champions came to an end on January 4, 2015, at Wrestle Kingdom 9 in Tokyo Dome, where they were defeated by Goto and Shibata.

Anderson and Gallows regained the title from Goto and Shibata on February 11 at The New Beginning in Osaka. They lost the title to The Kingdom (Matt Taven and Michael Bennett) on April 5 at Invasion Attack 2015. They regained the title from The Kingdom on July 5 at Dominion 7.5 in Osaka-jo Hall. From July 23 to August 15, Anderson took part in the 2015 G1 Climax. He entered the final day with a chance to advance from his block, but was eliminated after losing to Satoshi Kojima, giving him a record of six wins and three losses. During the tournament, Anderson defeated Shinsuke Nakamura, which led to him unsuccessfully challenging Nakamura for the IWGP Intercontinental Championship on November 7 at Power Struggle. On January 4, 2016, at Wrestle Kingdom 10 in Tokyo Dome, Anderson and Gallows lost the IWGP Tag Team Championship to Togi Makabe and Tomoaki Honma. Hours after the event, it was reported that both Anderson and Gallows had given their notice to NJPW on the morning of January 4, announcing that they were leaving the promotion for WWE. Anderson remained under NJPW contract and was expected to finish off his contracted dates with the promotion before leaving. On February 14 at The New Beginning in Niigata, Anderson and Gallows received a rematch for the IWGP Tag Team Championship, but were again defeated by Makabe and Honma. On February 19, Anderson confirmed in an interview with Tokyo Sports that he was leaving NJPW after the following day's Honor Rising: Japan 2016 show. In his final NJPW match, Anderson teamed with Bad Luck Fale, Doc Gallows and Tama Tonga, losing to Bobby Fish, Hirooki Goto, Katsuyori Shibata and Kyle O'Reilly in an eight-man tag team match.

=== Independent circuit (2014–2016) ===
On December 20, 2014, Anderson and Gallows made their debut as a tag team on the American independent circuit, defeating Reality Check (Craven Varro and Devon Moore) at a Pro Wrestling Syndicate (PWS) event. During the summer of 2015, the two worked several Global Force Wrestling (GFW) events, where they took part in the GFW Tag Team Championship tournament. In October 2015, Anderson and Gallows took part in a Revolution Pro Wrestling (RPW) event in Reading, England, which also featured several other NJPW wrestlers. That same month, they also took part in German promotion Westside Xtreme Wrestling's World Tag Team Tournament, where they made it to the quarterfinals, before losing to Big Daddy Walter and Zack Sabre Jr.

=== WWE (2016–2020) ===
==== Tag team championship pursuits (2016–2019) ====
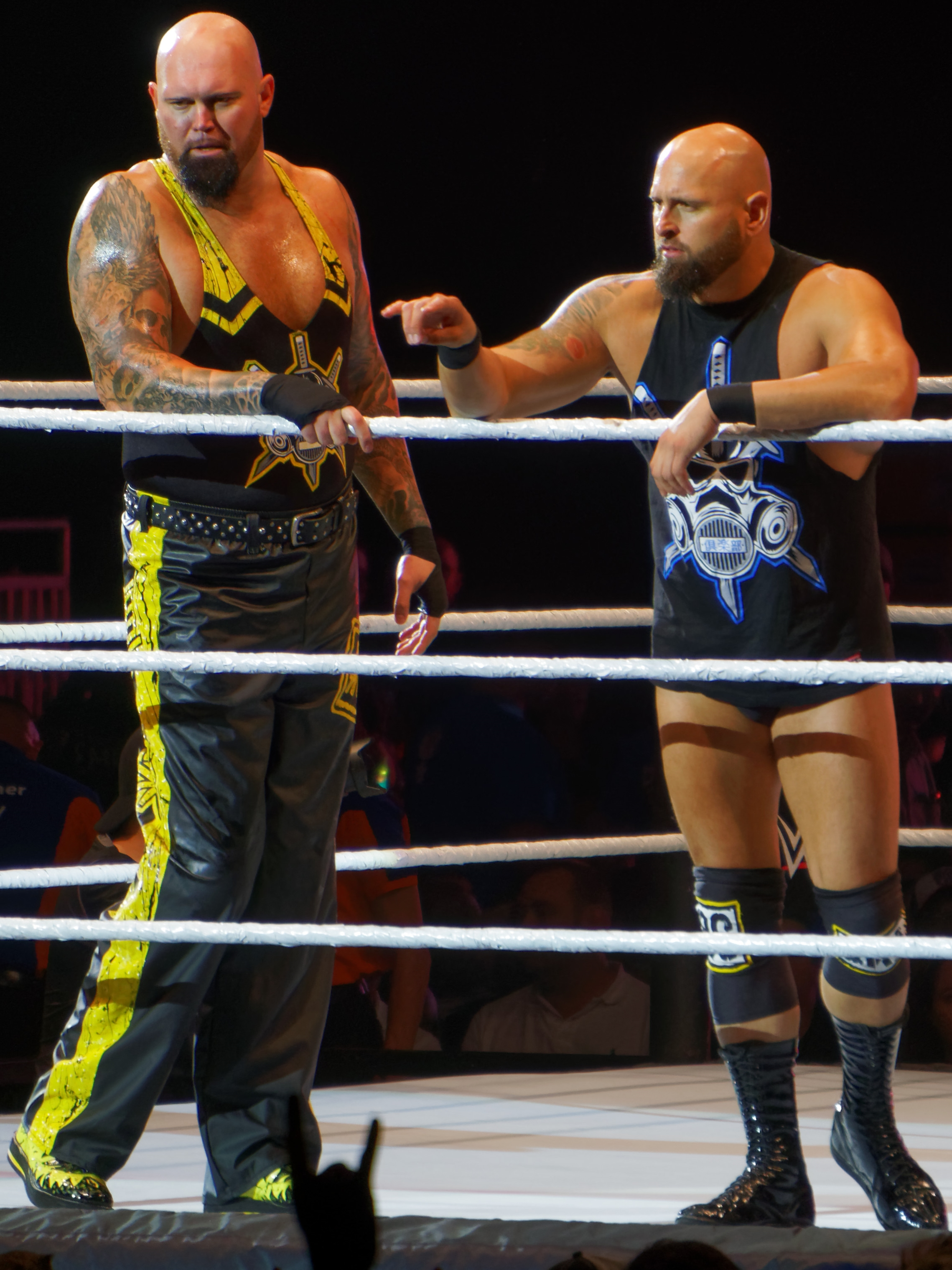
Gallows (left) with Karl Anderson in September 2016

On the April 11, 2016, episode of Raw, Anderson and Gallows (with Gallows reverting to his former WWE ring name, Luke Gallows) made their debut, attacking The Usos. On the April 18 episode of Raw, Anderson and Gallows attacked WWE World Heavyweight Champion Roman Reigns, following Reigns' promo with AJ Styles. During this time, Anderson and Gallows helped Styles in his feud with Reigns, with Styles at first reluctant for their help. Gallows and Anderson wrestled their first WWE match on the April 25 episode of Raw, defeating The Usos. On the May 30 episode of Raw, Styles would confront a returning John Cena who said the "new era" would have to go through him, before offering Styles his hand. Styles shook his hand, shortly before Anderson and Gallows interrupted. As Styles and Cena appeared ready to fight Anderson and Gallows, Styles instead beat down Cena repeatedly, reuniting The Club.

On July 19, as part of WWE draft, both Anderson and Gallows were drafted to Raw, while AJ Styles was drafted to SmackDown, splitting up The Club. On July 24 at Battleground, The Club wrestled together for the final time, in a loss to Cena and Enzo and Cass. After separating from Styles, Gallows and Anderson resumed feuding with The New Day, leading up to a SummerSlam match for the WWE Tag Team Championship, which they won by disqualification because of show guest Jon Stewart and a returning Big E getting involved. At Clash of Champions, Anderson and Gallows failed to win the titles. In November, Anderson and Gallows were announced as part of Team Raw for the 10–on–10 Survivor Series Tag Team Elimination match at Survivor Series, which they won. On the January 18, 2017, episode of Raw, Anderson and Gallows appeared to defeat Cesaro and Sheamus by pinfall for the Raw Tag Team Championship; however, due to Sheamus having hit the referee, the decision was reversed to a disqualification, leading to them winning the match but not the title. On the Royal Rumble preshow, Anderson and Gallows defeated Cesaro and Sheamus to win the Raw Tag Team Championship for the first time. They lost the title to returning The Hardy Boyz at WrestleMania 33 in a fatal four-way tag team ladder match. At the Payback kick-off show on April 30, Anderson and Gallows lost to Enzo and Cass. For the rest of 2017, Anderson and Gallows were mostly off television, only appearing sporadically on Raw and mainly being relegated to Main Event.

On the January 1, 2018 Raw, the duo turned face by appearing as former Bullet Club stablemate Finn Bálor's surprise tag team partners. After a brief feud, they lost to The Revival at the Royal Rumble pre-show. On April 17, Anderson and Gallows were both drafted to SmackDown as part of Superstar Shake-up. At WrestleMania 34 on April 8, Anderson and Gallows competed in the André the Giant Memorial Battle Royal, but did not win. On the May 22 episode of SmackDown, Anderson and Gallows defeated The Usos to become number one contenders for the SmackDown Tag Team Championship, but they failed to win the title from The Bludgeon Brothers on the Money in the Bank pre-show and also lost a rematch on the June 19 episode of SmackDown. At WrestleMania 35 in April 2019, Anderson and Gallows wrestled in their second André the Giant Memorial Battle Royal, but again did not win.

==== The O.C. (2019–2020) ====
On the April 29 episode of Raw, Anderson and Gallows returned to the Raw brand, losing to The Usos. As of that match, they had not won a match on television since they defeated The Usos in May 2018. In July 2019, it was reported that Gallows and Anderson had re-signed with WWE to five-year contracts. After Styles lost a United States Championship match to Ricochet; Anderson and Gallows helped Styles to beat up Ricochet, and reuniting The Club as heels. On the July 22 episode of Raw, The Club was renamed The O.C., which means "Original Club". On the July 30 episode of Raw, Gallows and Anderson became two-time Raw Tag Team Champions by defeating The Revival and The Usos in a triple threat tag team match. Within weeks, they had lost the titles to Rollins and Strowman. At Crown Jewel, Anderson and Gallows won the WWE Tag Team World Cup, by defeating eight other teams. Anderson participated in the Royal Rumble match at the namesake pay-per-view and entered at #20 but was eliminated by Randy Orton.

Anderson's final appearance in this stint with WWE would be alongside Gallows and Styles as part of the Boneyard match at WrestleMania 36 against The Undertaker. On April 15, 2020, Anderson was released by WWE along with several other superstars because of measures implemented by WWE due to the COVID-19 pandemic.

=== Impact Wrestling (2020–2022) ===
On July 18, 2020, Gallows and Anderson announced that they had both signed two-year contracts with Impact Wrestling and would be appearing at Slammiversary. At the event, Gallows (reverting to his Doc Gallows in ring name), and Anderson (using his "Machine Gun" nickname), now known as The Good Brothers, appeared at the end of the show helping Eddie Edwards fend off Ace Austin and Madman Fulton before celebrating with Edwards, establishing themselves as fan favorites. at Bound for Glory, Gallows and Anderson competed in a Four-way tag team match for the Impact World Tag Team Championship which was won by The North. At Turning Point, Gallows and Anderson defeated The North to win the Impact World Tag Team Championship for the first time, becoming the second tag team (after The Dudley Boyz) to win tag gold in NJPW, WWE and Impact.

On the February 19, 2022, at No Surrender, The Good Brothers rejoined Bullet Club.

=== Return to independent circuit (2020–2022) ===
Since departing WWE, The Good Brothers returned to the American independent circuit. On August 1, 2020, Anderson and Gallows along with Rocky Romero promoted their first pay-per-view event called Talk 'N Shop A Mania. They held a second event later that year in November called Talk 'N Shop A Mania 2: Rise Of The Torturer.

On September 26, 2020, The Good Brothers won Lariato Pro Wrestling Guild's Lariato Pro Tag Team Championship by defeating Regenesis (Francisco Ciatso and Storm Thomas), their first title on the independent circuit.

=== All Elite Wrestling (2021) ===
Gallows with Anderson as The Good Brothers made their AEW debut at the end of AEW Dynamite New Year's Smash Night 1, saving Kenny Omega from Jon Moxley and making the "Too Sweet" hand gesture along with Omega and The Young Bucks. Gallows and Anderson were making appearances in AEW, due to a working relationship crossover deal with Impact Wrestling.

=== Return to NJPW (2021–2023) ===
In June 2021, it was announced that Anderson along with Gallows would be returning to New Japan Pro Wrestling for the first time since early 2016 as part of the United States–based show NJPW Strong and would compete in its Tag Team Turbulence tournament. After Jon Moxley defended the IWGP United States Heavyweight Championship against Yuji Nagata, Anderson cut a promo challenging Moxley for a match for his title in which Moxley later accepted the challenge with their match taking place on All Elite Wrestling's Fyter Fest special. On July 14, 2021, at Fyter Fest, Anderson unsuccessfully challenged Moxley for the IWGP United States Heavyweight Championship. From July 16 until July 30, Anderson and Gallows took part in the Tag Team Turbulence, where they won after defeating Violence Unlimited (Brody King and Chris Dickinson). Following the match, Jon Moxley appeared in a pre-taped video challenging them to a match, while also promising to bring a surprise partner to his team. On August 1, The Good Brothers accepted Moxley's challenge. The following day, NJPW made the match official. On August 14, at Resurgence, The Good Brothers defeated Moxley and Yuji Nagata. After the match, Anderson and Gallows were confronted by the Guerrillas of Destiny (Tama Tonga and Tanga Loa), before Anderson and Gallows left the arena.

On May 1 at Wrestling Dontaku, Anderson and Gallows made their return to NJPW after six years, attacking Jado and Tama Tonga, before Anderson challenged Tonga to a match for the NEVER Openweight Championship. On June 12 at Dominion 6.12 in Osaka-jo Hall, Anderson defeated Tonga to win the NEVER Openweight Championship, winning his first singles title in NJPW. On October 10, 2022, Anderson unexpectedly returned to WWE, while still being recognized as the NEVER Openweight Champion. On October 10, it was reported by Pro Wrestling Insider, that Anderson and Gallows were believed to be heading back to WWE, which was confirmed later that day, following their appearance on the episode of WWE's Monday Night Raw. On October 20, Anderson posted a video on his Twitter page, indicating that he would not be making his advertised commitment, with his tag team partner Doc Gallows not approving his appearance. Despite comments from Gallows, Anderson's expressed his approval to defend the title, but due to both featuring for a WWE event in Saudi Arabia on November 5, Anderson was unable to attend the title match, in direct conflict with Anderson's prior commitment. Over the following days, NJPW attempted to negotiate with Anderson, for a title defense, leading on October 26, NJPW announcing should Anderson decide to renege on his scheduled title match, he would be forced to vacate the NEVER Openweight Championship and return the title belt to NJPW immediately. This led to Anderson returning to NJPW on December 14, where he successfully defended the title against Hikuleo. On January 4, 2023, at Wrestle Kingdom 17, Anderson dropped the NEVER Openweight Championship back to Tama Tonga, marking his last appearance for the promotion.

=== Return to WWE (2022–2025) ===
On the October 10, 2022, episode of Raw, Anderson and Gallows made their unannounced return to WWE as faces, saving AJ Styles from an attack by The Judgment Day after Styles fooled Finn Bálor into thinking he had joined them by embracing in a hug. The O.C decided to take the Judgment Day on at Crown Jewel on November 5, 2022. The team ended up with a loss because of Rhea Ripley. After the loss because of the interference, Mia Yim decided to join The O.C and help them fend off Ripley. As part of the 2023 WWE Draft, Anderson was drafted to the SmackDown brand.

On the February 20, 2024 episode of NXT, Anderson and Gallows attacked Axiom and Nathan Frazer and Chase University (Andre Chase and Duke Hudson) after the two teams faced each other, turning heel for the first time since 2022 and marking Anderson and Gallows' return to NXT. Gallows and Anderson wrestled their return NXT match on the April 25 episode of NXT, defeating Edris Enofe and Malik Blade. On February 8, 2025, Anderson (along with Gallows) was released from WWE for the second time.

Anderson (along with Gallows) would later make an appearance at the 2026 WWE Hall of Fame to induct AJ Styles.

=== Second return to NJPW (2025–present) ===
On May 8, 2025, Gallows and Anderson announced that they would be returning to NJPW and will team with The Young Bucks against Bullet Club War Dogs (Clark Connors, David Finlay, Gabe Kidd, and Gedo) on May 9 at Resurgence. At Resurgence, The Good Brothers and the Young Bucks defeated Bullet Club War Dogs.

=== Second return to independent circuit (2025–present) ===
On May 10, 2025, the Good Brothers made their debut for Maple Leaf Pro Wrestling (MLP) at Northern Rising, where they faced Bullet Club War Dogs (David Finlay and Drilla Moloney) with the match ending in a double countout. On July 5 at MLP Resurrection, the Good Brothers defeated Finlay and Moloney in a rematch.

=== Pro Wrestling Noah (2026–present) ===
On January 1, 2026 at Noah The New Year 2026, the Good Brothers made their Pro Wrestling Noah debut, defeating Kaito Kiyomiya and Jack Morris.

== Personal life ==
Allegra has five sons with his wife Christine Bui, to whom he affectionately refers as his "Hot Asian Wife". The family lives in Odessa, Florida, having previously lived in Fairfield, Ohio. Allegra is close friends with Fergal Devitt (now known as Finn Bálor) and Shinsuke Nakamura, whom he first met at the New Japan Pro-Wrestling dojo in Los Angeles. He is also close friends with Allen Jones (best known as AJ Styles) and long time tag team partner Drew Hankinson (best known as Doc Gallows and Luke Gallows), often referring to the former as "Uncle Allen".

== Other media ==
Allegra made his video game debut in WWE 2K17 as Karl Anderson alongside tag-team partner Luke Gallows as DLC. He also appears in WWE 2K18, WWE 2K19, WWE 2K20, WWE 2K Battlegrounds, WWE 2K23 (once again as DLC), WWE 2K24., and WWE 2K25.

== Championships and accomplishments ==
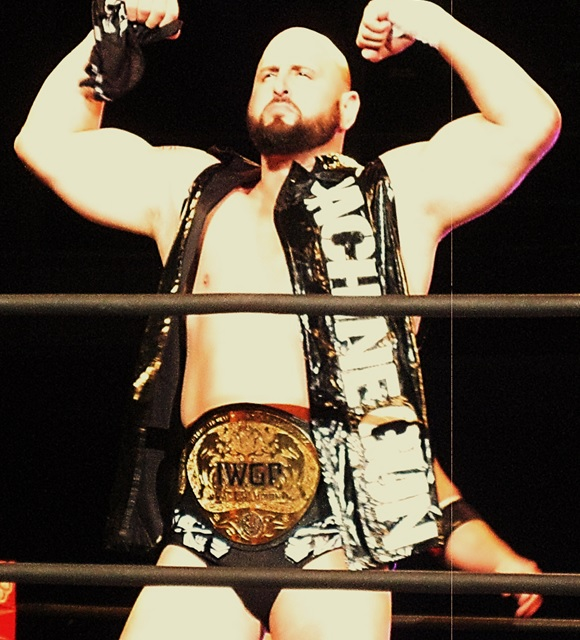
Anderson is a four-time IWGP Tag Team Champion.

- AAW: Professional Wrestling Redefined
  - AAW Tag Team Championship (1 time) – with Doc Gallows
- Atomic Legacy Wrestling
  - ALW Tag Team Championship (1 time) – with Doc Gallows
- Appalachian Wrestling Federation
  - AWF Tag Team Championship (1 time) – with Jay Donaldson
- Empire Wrestling Federation
  - EWF American Championship (1 time)
- FLEX Wrestling
  - FLEX Tag Team Championship (1 time, current) – with Doc Gallows
- Impact Wrestling
  - Impact World Tag Team Championship (3 times) – with Doc Gallows
  - Impact Year End Awards (3 times)
    - Finishing Move of the Year (2020) – Magic Killer (with Doc Gallows)
    - Moment of the Year (2020) – The Good Brothers' Impact debut at Slammiversary, shared with the other returns and debuts that night
    - Tag Team of the Year (2021) – with Doc Gallows
- Lariato Pro Wrestling
  - Lariato Pro Tag Team Championship (1 time) – with Doc Gallows
- MCW Pro Wrestling
  - MCW Tag Team Championship (1 time) – with Doc Gallows
- Major League Wrestling
  - MLW World Tag Team Championship (1 time, current) – with Doc Gallows
- Maple Leaf Pro Wrestling
  - MLP Canadian Tag Team Championship (1 time, inaugural) – with Doc Gallows
- National Wrestling Alliance
  - NWA World Tag Team Championship (1 time) – with Joey Ryan
- NWA Midwest
  - NWA Heartland States Heavyweight Championship (1 time)
- NWA United Kingdom
  - NWA British Commonwealth Heavyweight Championship (1 time)
- New Japan Pro-Wrestling
  - IWGP Tag Team Championship (4 times) – with Giant Bernard (1) and Doc Gallows (3)
  - NEVER Openweight Championship (1 time)
  - G1 Tag League (2009) – with Giant Bernard
  - World Tag League (2012) – with Hirooki Goto
  - World Tag League (2013) – with Doc Gallows
  - NJPW Strong Tag Team Turbulence Tournament (2021) – with Doc Gallows
- Nikkan Sports
  - Best Tag Team Award (2011) with Giant Bernard
  - Outstanding Performance Award (2012)
- Northern Wrestling Federation
  - NWF Heavyweight Championship (2 times)
  - NWF Tri-State Championship (1 time)
- Pro Wrestling Illustrated
  - Ranked 64 of the top 500 singles wrestlers in the PWI 500 in 2012
- Pro Wrestling Noah
  - GHC Tag Team Championship (1 time) – with Giant Bernard
- The Crash
  - The Crash Tag Team Championship (1 time) – with Doc Gallows
- Wrestling Observer Newsletter
  - Tag Team of the Year (2011) – with Giant Bernard
- World Series Wrestling
  - WSW Tag Team Championship (2 times, current) – with Doc Gallows
- WWE
  - WWE Raw Tag Team Championship (2 times) – with Luke Gallows
  - WWE Tag Team World Cup (2019) – with Luke Gallows
- Other titles
  - Talk 'N Shop A Mania 24/7 Championship (1 time)
