= EWF Cruiserweight Championship =

Professional wrestling championship

Details
- Promotion: Empire Wrestling Federation
- Date established: November 24, 2004
- Date retired: June 13, 2010
Statistics
- First champion(s): Liger Rivera
- Final champion(s): Ray Rosas

The EWF Cruiserweight Championship was a professional wrestling title for the cruiserweight division (220 lbs. and under) in the Southern California-based Empire Wrestling Federation independent promotion. It was established in 2004, with Liger Rivera as the first champion, who defeated Kid Karnage, Ryan Taylor and Jung Lee to win it. There have been a total of 14 recognized champions who have had a combined 19 official reigns.

== Title History ==
Wrestler:	Times:	Date:	Location:	Notes:
Liger Rivera	1	November 24, 2004	Covina, California	Defeated Kid Karnage, Ryan Taylor and Jung Lee in a Four Man Elimination Match.
Red Tornado	1	April 23, 2005	Riverside, California	Defeated Liger River and Ryan Taylor in a Triple Threat Match.
Liger Rivera	2	May 21, 2005	Riverside, California	
Bino Gambino	1	July 16, 2005	San Bernardino, California	
The K.I.D.D.	1	July 22, 2005	Covina, California	
Bino Gambino	2	August 26, 2005	Carson, California	
Joey Harder	1	September 22, 2005	San Francisco, California	
Ryan Taylor	1	June 9, 2006	Covina, California	
Markus Riot	1	July 13, 2007	Covina, California	This was a Two out of Three Falls Match.
Ryan Taylor	2	August 10, 2007	Covina, California	
Maximo	1	October 26, 2007	Covina, California	Defeated Ryan Taylor in a title vs. title match. Maximo was the Baja California Light Heavyweight Champion.
Markus Riot	2	December 9, 2007	Covina, California	
JT Blackstar	1	April 18, 2008	Covina, California	
Jeremy Jaeger	1	August 22, 2008	Covina, California	Defeated Blackstar and Chris Kadillak in a Triple Threat Match.
Chris Kadillak	1	May 15, 2009	Covina, California	
Brandon Parker	1	October 30, 2009	Covina, California	This was a Two out of Three Falls match.
Tim Lovato	1	December 27, 2009	Rowland Heights, California	Defeated Brandon Parker & Chris Kadillak in a Triple Threat Match.
Brandon Parker	2	May 21, 2010	Covina, California	
Ray Rosas	1	June 13, 2010	Riverside, California	
Championship has since been retired.
