= EWF Heavyweight Championship =

Professional wrestling championship

Details
- Promotion: Empire Wrestling Federation
- Date established: Jun 16, 1996
- Current champion: Gustavo Perez
- Date won: September 18. 2026
Statistics
- First champion: Bobby Bradley
- Most reigns: Mike Maze (5 reigns)
- Longest reign: Ryan Taylor (567 days)
- Shortest reign: Anthony Idol, Rock Riddle, Marty Elias and Vizzion (<1 day)

The EWF Heavyweight Championship is the top professional wrestling title in the Southern California-based Empire Wrestling Federation independent promotion. It was established in 1996, with Bobby Bradley as the first champion, who defeated Zuma to win it. There have been a total of 33 recognized champions who have had a combined 45 official reigns.

== Title history ==
As of September 20, 2026.

No.	Wrestler:	Reigns:	Date:	Days held:	Location:	Event:	Notes:
1	Bobby Bradley	1	Jun 16, 1996	140	San Bernardino, CA		Defeated Zuma to become the first champion.
2	The Irish Assassin	1	Nov 3, 1996	245	San Bernardino, CA		
3	Tim Patterson	1	Jul 6, 1997	56	San Bernardino, CA		
4	Bulldog Sampson	1	Aug 31, 1997	28	San Bernardino, CA		
5	Christopher Daniels	1	Sep 28, 1997	41	San Bernardino, CA		
6	Suicide Kid	1	Nov 8, 1997	175	Hemet, CA		
7	Bobby Bradley	2	May 2, 1998	92	Bloomington, CA		
8	John Black	1	Aug 2, 1998	105	Rialto, CA		
9	Rico Costantino	1	Nov 15, 1998	245	San Jacinto, CA		
-	Vacated	-	Jul 18, 1999	0	San Bernardino, CA		The title was vacated after Constantino signed a developmental contract with the World Wrestling Federation.
10	Frankie Kazarian	1	Jul 18, 1999	250	San Bernardino, CA		Defeated John Black.
11	Keiji Sakoda	1	Mar 24, 2000	51	San Bernardino, CA		
-	Vacated	-	May 14, 2000	0	Corona, CA		The title was vacated after Sakoda left the promotion.
12	Bobby Bradley	3	May 14, 2000	126	Corona, CA		Won a battle royal, last eliminating Mando Guerrero.
13	Eddie Williams	1	Sep 17, 2000	56	San Bernardino, CA		
14	Brian Owen	1	Nov 12, 2000	194	Riverside, CA		
15	Krazy K.C.	1	May 25, 2001	141	Lytle Creek, CA		
16	TOOL	1	Oct 13, 2001	154	San Bernardino, CA		
17	Krazy K.C.	2	Mar 16, 2002	71	San Bernardino, CA		
18	John Black	2	May 26, 2002	145	San Bernardino, CA		
19	Steve Masters	1	Oct 18, 2002	343	Covina, CA		
20	Bo Cooper	1	Sep 26, 2003	77	Covina, CA		
-	Vacated	-	Dec 12, 2003	0	Covina, CA		Cooper was stripped of the title after no-showing two consecutive scheduled defenses.
21	Vizzion	1	Dec 12, 2003	133	Covina, CA		Won a battle royal.
22	Kayam	1	Apr 23, 2004	14	Covina, CA		
23	Vizzion	2	May 7, 2004	156	La Puente, CA		
-	Vacated	-	Oct 10, 2004	0	Covina, CA		The title was held up after a match between Vizzion and Black Pearl ended in a double pin.
24	Vizzion	3	Oct 22, 2004	0	Covina, CA		Defeated Black Pearl.
25	Ricky Reyes	1	Oct 22, 2004	113	Covina, CA		
26	Jason King	1	Feb 12, 2005	223	Covina, CA	A New Era Begins	
27	Bino Gambino	1	Sep 23, 2005	142	Covina, CA	California Chaos Tour: Night Two	
28	Aaron Aguilera	1	Feb 12, 2006	28	Covina, CA	Total Annihilation	
-	Vacated	-	Mar 12, 2006	0	Covina, CA	Old School Justice	Aguilera was stripped of the title by EWF Commissioner Mando Guerrero due to no-showing a defense.
29	Chavo Guerrero, Sr.	1	Mar 12, 2006	7	Covina, CA	Old School Justice	He defeated Bino Gambino and Syrus to win the vacant title.
30	Syrus	1	Mar 19, 2006	68	El Monte, CA	Fallout: Night One	
31	Bino Gambino	2	May 26, 2006	224	San Bernardino, CA	Pro Wrestling Legends	
32	Joey Harder	1	Jan 5, 2007	168	Covina, CA	Series Finale	
33	Dan Kobrick	1	Jun 22, 2007	154	Covina, CA	Knockdown Dragout	
34	Bino Gambino	3	Nov 23, 2007	51	Covina, CA	Thanksgiving Throwdown II	
35	Brandon Gatson	1	Jan 13, 2008	110	San Bernardino, CA	Return to the Hudson	
36	Scorpio Sky	1	May 2, 2008	112	Covina, CA	12th Anniversary Extravaganza: Nothing Personal	This was a Two out of three falls match.
-	Vacated	-	Aug 22, 2008	0	Covina, CA	Red Hot Summer	The title was vacated due to Scorpio Sky being injured.
37	Brandon Gatson	2	Aug 22, 2008	50	Covina, CA	Red Hot Summer	Defeated Mikey Nicholls, Joey Ryan and Sonny Samson in a four-way elimination match.
38	Black Metal	1	Oct 11, 2008	139	San Bernardino, CA	Vendetta II	
39	Brandon Gatson	3	Feb 27, 2009	245	San Bernardino, CA	Total Annihilation 4	
40	Ryan Taylor	1	Oct 30, 2009	567	Covina, CA	Vendetta III: Halloween Madness	
41	Johnny Starr	1	May 20, 2011	84	Covina, CA	15th Anniversary Show	Mikey Henderson served as the special guest referee.
42	Ryan Taylor	2	August 12, 2011	21	Covina, CA	Sweet Revenge	Shaun Ricker served as the special guest referee.
43	Shaun Ricker	1	September 2, 2011	21	Covina, CA		
44	Johnny Starr	2	September 23, 2011	252	Covina, CA	Last Man Standing	
-	Vacated	-	June 1, 2012	0	Covina, CA		Starr vacates the title to recover from injuries.
45	Joey Ryan	1	July 6, 2012	154	Covina, CA		Defeated Brandon Gatson and Mike Maze in a three-way match to win the vacant title.
46	Brandon Gatson	4	December 7, 2012	147			
47	Marty Ellias	1	May 3, 2013	0	Covina, CA	EWF 17th Anniversary Extravaganza	
-	Vacated	-	May 3, 2013	0	Covina, CA	EWF 17th Anniversary Extravaganza	Due to Ellias trying to give the title to Brute Barreto, the title was vacated by Johnny Starr.
48	Mike Maze	1	May 3, 2013	22	Covina, CA	EWF 17th Anniversary Extravaganza	Maze won a 44 man Great Goliath Rumble
49	Raccid Najjar	1	May 25, 2013	1	Lytle Creek, CA		
50	Mike Maze	2	May 26, 2013	159	Covina, CA		
51	Tommy Wilson	1	November 1, 2013	182	Covina, CA		
52	Mike Maze	3	May 2, 2014	56	Covina, CA	EWF 18th Anniversary Extravaganza	Casket Match
53	Rock Riddle	1	June 27, 2014	0	Covina, CA		
54	Mike Maze	4	June 27, 2014	50	Covina, CA		
55	Juan Roman	1	August 16, 2014	111	San Bernardino, CA		
56	Mike Maze	5	December 5, 2014	245	Covina, Ca		
57	Gary Yap's Man In Black	1	August 7, 2015	279	Covina, Ca		
58	Uptown Andy Brown	1	May 12, 2016	428	Covina, Ca		
59	Fidel Bravo	1	July 14, 2017	294	Covina, Ca	The Independence Day Massacre	Bravo won a Fatal 4 Way vs Friar Roman, Mariachi Loco and Andy Brown by pinning Loco.
60	Uptown Andy Brown	2	May 4, 2018	3061	Covina, Ca	EWF 22nd Anniversary Extravaganza	This was a Roman Gladiator Death Match.
61	The Decapitator	1	August 31, 2018	1	Covina, California	EWF	
62	El Mariachi Loco	1	December 07, 2018	84	Covina, California	EWF Jingle Slam 9	
63	Rico Dynamite	1	March 01, 2019	104	Covina, California	EWF All Tangled Up	
64	El Mariachi Loco	2	June 13, 2019	119	Covina, California	EWF	This was a Best Two Out Of Three Falls match. Mariachi scored 2 falls against Idol's 0 to win the title.
65	Anthony Idol	1	October 10, 2019	<1	Covina, California	EWF	
66	Rico Dynamite	2	October 4, 2019	934	Covina, California	EWF	
67	Antony Idol	2	May 1, 2022	162	San Bernardino, California	EWF 26th Anniversary Show	
68	J2 Mattioli	1	October 8, 2022	1,441+	San Bernardino, California	EWF	This was a steel cage match.

== See also ==
- Empire Wrestling Federation
