= Rico Constantino =

Italian-American professional wrestler (born 1961)

Rico Costantino
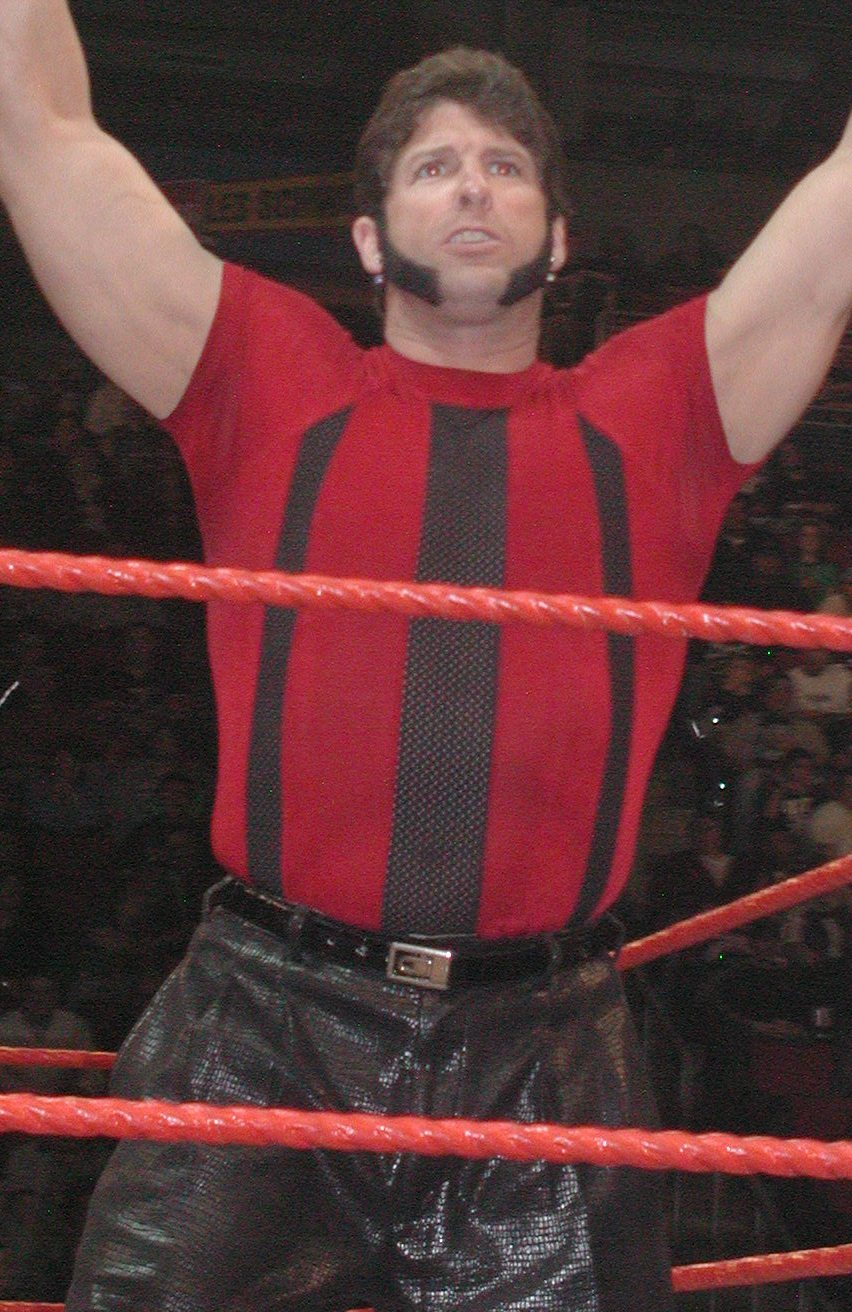
- Costantino in 2003

Personal information
- Born: Americo Sabastiano Costantino; October 1, 1961 (age 65) Las Vegas, Nevada, U.S.
- Education: Northwestern Military and Naval Academy

Professional wrestling career
- Ring name(s): Rico; Rico Costantino; The Cobra
- Billed height: 6 ft 0 in (1.83 m)
- Billed weight: 230 lb (100 kg)
- Billed from: Las Vegas, Nevada
- Trained by: Jesse Hernandez; Ohio Valley Wrestling
- Debut: 1998
- Retired: 2012

Americo Sebastiano Costantino (born October 1, 1961) is a retired American professional wrestler. He performed under the ring names Rico Costantino and Rico in World Wrestling Entertainment (WWE) from 1998 to 2004.

== Early life ==
Costantino was a contestant on the American television series American Gladiators. When challenging one of the show's gladiators, Gemini, Constantino won once and fought to a draw twice in their three Joust bouts. Costantino was the champion for the first half of the 1990–1991 season. In the Grand Championship, Rico came up just short, losing to Craig Branham by 7 points (3 1/2 seconds) in the Eliminator portion of the show. Costantino next appeared on the European game show Fort Boyard, with a win over his former Gladiator nemesis Craig Branham. On the show, he was the only competitor to capture the highest tiered “red ball” in the bungee jump challenge on an upswing.

== Professional wrestling career ==
=== Ohio Valley Wrestling and early career (1998–2002) ===
Costantino began to train with the Empire Wrestling Federation for a career in the wrestling business. Costantino was discovered by World Wrestling Federation (WWF) officials Terry Taylor and Dr. Tom Prichard. After only 12 matches, Costantino signed a developmental deal with the WWF. Costantino was sent to Ohio Valley Wrestling for further training, before being sent up to work for WWF.

He became a three time OVW Champion, a MPPW Heavyweight Champion and a HWA Heavyweight Champion.

In 2001, he started working dark matches for the WWF against Randy Orton, Brock Lesnar, Raven, Hurricane Helms, Billy Gunn, Steven Richards and Tajiri.

=== World Wrestling Federation / Entertainment (2002–2004) ===
He debuted in WWF on the March 21, 2002 episode of SmackDown! as the stylist of Billy and Chuck (the heel gimmicks of Billy Gunn and Chuck Palumbo), establishing himself as a villain. Rico portrayed a homosexual stylist as his gimmick and grew muttonchops similar to the exótico gimmicks in Mexico. On the May 9 episode of SmackDown!, Rico wrestled his first match in WWE, where he teamed with Billy and Chuck to defeat Al Snow, Maven and Rikishi. At Judgment Day, Rico was forced to team with Rikishi to defeat his clients, Billy and Chuck for the World Tag Team Championship. On the June 6 episode of SmackDown!, Rico turned on Rikishi by helping Billy and Chuck in pinning Rikishi for the tag titles.

On the September 12 episode of SmackDown!, Rico moved over to the Raw brand and became the manager of 3-Minute Warning (then-heel, Rosey and Jamal). He ended up turning on 3-Minute Warning after they lost a match to the Dudley Boyz. However both he and 3-Minute Warning all remained heels during that time. After turning on 3-Minute Warning, Rico scored an upset victory over Ric Flair.

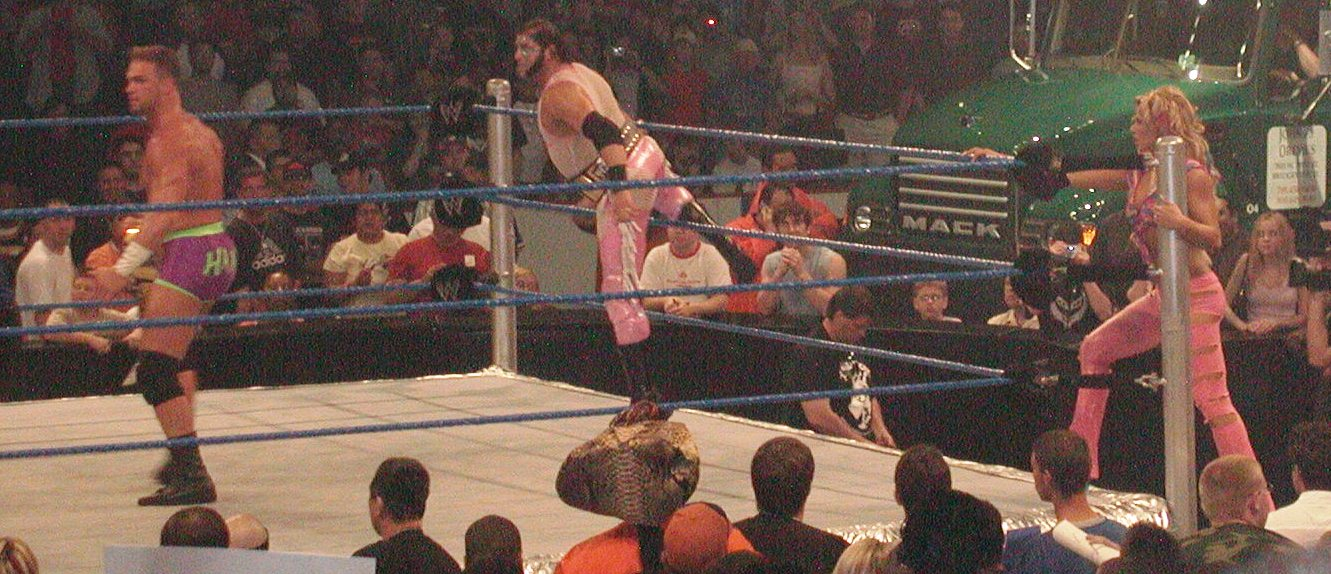
Charlie Haas (left) with Rico (center) and Miss Jackie (right)

Rico would soon return to Raw in 2003 with Miss Jackie appearing as his manager. He retained the essence of the masculinity gimmick he shared with Gunn and Palumbo while taking it to new levels, much in the vein of Adrian Street and painting his face and later grew out his hair. Then, on the March 22, 2004 edition of Raw, Rico got drafted to SmackDown! and became a fan favorite due to fan reaction to his over-the-top exótico style gimmick, teaming up with an initially reluctant partner, Charlie Haas, (with whom he held the WWE Tag Team Championship) and had a valet, Miss Jackie. Rico was unexpectedly released by WWE on November 7, 2004. According to Constantino, he was released after he asked for a raise.

=== All Japan Pro Wrestling (2005) ===
After his release, he went to All-Japan Pro Wrestling, where he and former WWE colleague Bull Buchanan defeated Mitsuya Nagai and Masayuki Naruse on the first event of the "Excite Series" in Tokyo, Japan to win the All Asia Tag Team Championship. Costantino retired from professional wrestling in July 2005, causing him and Buchanan to vacate the All Asia Tag Team Titles.

=== Future Stars of Wrestling (2012) ===
Rico came out of retirement for a Future Stars of Wrestling (FSW) TV taping in Las Vegas on November 17, 2012, where he teamed up with Beast to defeat the team of Gregory Sharpe and Clutch.

=== All Elite Wrestling (2024) ===
Rico made a special appearance for All Elite Wrestling (AEW) at the WrestleDream Zero Hour pre-show on October 12, 2024, where he accompanied MxM Collection in their match against The Acclaimed.

== Personal life ==
Costantino entered Northwestern Military and Naval Academy, graduating near the top of his class and at one point considered enrollment at West Point. Whilst attending Northwestern Military and Naval Academy in Lake Geneva, Wisconsin, Costantino returned to Las Vegas and settled into a career as a paramedic, which in turn led to enrollment in the police academy. Costantino was also on the SWAT team at one point, paving the way for his next career as a bodyguard.

In August 2005, Costantino completed his law enforcement training in Boulder City, Nevada, outside of Las Vegas. As of 2006, he was a Sergeant Inspector for the Nevada Taxi Cab Authority. Beginning in 2016, he suffered health issues relating to heart problems and a series of concussions.

== Championships and accomplishments ==
=== American Gladiators ===
- American Gladiators Champion (1990–1991)

=== Professional wrestling ===
- All Japan Pro Wrestling
  - All Asia Tag Team Championship (1 time) – with Bull Buchanan
- Empire Wrestling Federation
  - EWF Heavyweight Championship (1 time)
- Heartland Wrestling Association
  - HWA Heavyweight Championship (1 time)
- Ohio Valley Wrestling
  - OVW Heavyweight Championship (3 times)
  - OVW Southern Tag Team Championship (1 time) – with The Prototype
  - MPPW Heavyweight Championship (1 time)
- Power Pro Wrestling
  - MPPW Heavyweight Championship (1 time)
- World Wrestling Entertainment
  - WWE Tag Team Championship (1 time) – with Charlie Haas
  - World Tag Team Championship (1 time) – with Rikishi
- Wrestling Observer Newsletter
  - Worst Gimmick (2003)

== See also ==
- List of exóticos
