= EWF American Heavyweight Championship =

Professional wrestling championship

Details
- Promotion: Empire Wrestling Federation
- Date established: March 7, 1999
- Current champion(s): "Trailer King" Logan Alexander
- Date won: March 12, 2020
Statistics
- First champion(s): Mr. Quick
- Most reigns: Vizzion (3 reigns)
- Longest reign: Anthony Idol (344 days)
- Shortest reign: The Nomad (<1 day)

The EWF American Championship is the next most prestigious professional wrestling title in the Southern California-based Empire Wrestling Federation independent promotion behind the EWF Heavyweight Championship. It was established in 1999, with Mr. Quick who was awarded the title from the EWF. There have been a total of 24 recognized champions who have had a combined 30 official reigns.

== Title history ==
Wrestler:	Times:	Date:	Location:	Notes:
Mr. Quick	1	March 7, 1999	Victorville, California	Awarded title by the EWF to become the first champion.
Vacant May 9, 1999 due to health problems.
Tim Patterson	1	May 9, 1999	San Bernardino, California	Defeated Bo Cooper after title was declared vacant.
Krazy K.C.	1	September 12, 1999	San Bernardino, California	
Josh Galaxy	1	February 26, 2000	San Bernardino, California	
Krazy K.C.	2	March 24, 2000	San Bernardino, California	
Brian Owen	1	June 25, 2000	San Bernardino, California	
Eddie Williams	1	October 15, 2000	Riverside, California	
Title vacated on November 12, 2000 after Eddie Williams retired from wrestling.
Johnny Dynamite	1	May 26, 2001	San Bernardino, California	Defeated J.J. Dupree for the vacant title.
Nomad	1	September 15, 2001	San Bernardino, California	
Johnny Dynamite	2	September 15, 2001	San Bernardino, California	
John Black	1	January 19, 2002	Fontana, California	Gave the title to his tag team partner, Under Pressure.
Under Pressure	1	June 15, 2002	San Bernardino, California	Given the title by his tag team partner, John Black.
Warchild	1	June 21, 2002	Covina, California	
Vizzion	1	September 28, 2002	San Bernardino, California	
Touradj	1	December 8, 2002	Bakersfield, California	
Krazy K.C.	3	February 2, 2003	Bakersfield, California	Stripped of title for no showing a title defense.
Jason King	1	August 22, 2003	Covina, California	Defeated Rudy Luna, Jason Sanders, Ragin' Dawg, Kayam and Enigma de Oro for the vacant title.
Ragin' Dawg	1	February 20, 2004	Covina, California	
Bigg Q	1	June 25, 2004	Covina, California	Defeated Ragin' Dawg and Kenny King in a Triple Threat Match.
Johnny Starr	1	October 22, 2004	Covina, California	
The Plague	1	March 25, 2005	Covina, California	
Jason King	2	June 24, 2005	Covina, California	Defeated The Plague in a title vs. title match at Unsupervised to become the first EWF Super Crown Champion.
Syrus	1	July 22, 2005	Covina, California	Won the title at Independent's Day: Night Two.
Vizzion	2	December 23, 2005	Covina, California	Won the title at Holiday Fear.
Vizzion vacated the title on April 14, 2006 due to an injury.
Dan Kobrick	1	May 14, 2006	Covina, California	Defeated Angelas in a tournament final at the 10th Anniversary Extravaganza.
Human Tornado	1	February 9, 2007	Covina, California	Won the title at Damage Control 2.
Karl Anderson	1	April 13, 2007	Covina, California	Won the title at FALLOUT 2.
Mikey Nicholls	1	September 7, 2007	Covina, CA	Defeated Karl Anderson and Ryan Taylor in a Triple Threat Iron Man Match at Gold Standard, with a score of 3-2-2.
Hook Bomberry	1	October 31, 2007	Yucaipa, California	Won the title at Halloween Horror 2007.
Vizzion	3	May 2, 2008	Covina, California	Won the title at 12th Anniversary Extravaganza: Nothing Personal.
Ryan Taylor	1	August 23, 2008	San Bernardino, California	Won the title at Flirting with Disaster.
Liger Rivera	1	May 15, 2009	Covina, California	Won the title at the 13th Anniversary Extravaganza.
Extreme Loco	1	January 8, 2010	Covina, CA	Defeated Chris Kadillak in a tournament final.
Liger Rivera	2	May 21, 2010	Covina, CA	
Chris Kadilak	1	September 24, 2010	Covina, CA	
Terex	1	January 14, 2011	Covina, CA	defeated Chris Kadillak at New Year New Beginnings
"Iron Man" Mike Maze	1	May 20, 2011	Covina, CA	Won the title at the 15th Anniversary Extravaganza by pinning Terex after hitting him with a flyg elbow.
"Mega King" Tommy Wilson	1	March 4, 2012	Covina, CA	
SoCal Crazy	1	August 3, 2012	Covina, CA	
Sugar Sweet	1	February 1, 2013	Covina, CA	
Raccid Najjar	1	July 19, 2013	Azusa, CA	
Uptown Andy Brown	1	October 26, 2013	San Bernardino, CA	
Richie Slade	1	May 18, 2014	Covina, CA	
Brandon Gatson	1	September 5, 2014	Covina, CA	
Richie Slade	2	October 26, 2014	Covina, CA	
Richie Slade	1	May 18, 2014	Covina, CA	
Mike Maze	2	May 8, 2015	Covina, CA	Defeats The EWF Heavyweight Champion Richie Slade in a double title match.
Mike Maze vacates the title on June 5, 2015
Vance Garayt	1	July 3, 2015	Covina, CA	Defeats Adrian Quest, Anthony Idol, Richie Slade, R.J. Ruiz, and the Viking Warrior in 6-way match.
Anthony Idol	1	September 4, 2015	Covina, CA	
Jorel Nelson	1	August 13, 2016	San Jacinto, California	
Tommy Wilson	2	September 17, 2016	California, USA	
Jorel Nelson	2	September 24, 2016	Rialto, California	
Anthony Idol	2	October 06, 2016	Corona, California	
Super Beetle	1	May 05, 2017	Covina, California	
Andy Brown	2	September, 2017	California, USA	
Dicky Mayer	1	October 13, 2017	Covina, California	
Adrian Quest	1	May 04, 2018	Covina, California	
Rico Dynamite	1	June 01, 2018	Covina, California	
Jordan Clearwater	1	May 03, 2019	Covina, California	
Honest John	1	November 29, 2019	Covina, California	
Jordan Clearwater	2	January 17, 2020	Covina, California	
Vacated on June 25, 2021.
Juan Roman	1	October 23, 2021	San Bernardino, California	
"Trailer King" Logan Alexander	1	March 12th, 2022	Covina, California	
"El Vato Loco" Erick Rojas	1	December 10th, 2022	San Bernardino, California	
"The Latino Frankenstein" Maniac Mike	1	April 29th, 2023	Riverside, California	
