= Mikey Nicholls =

Australian professional wrestler (born 1985)

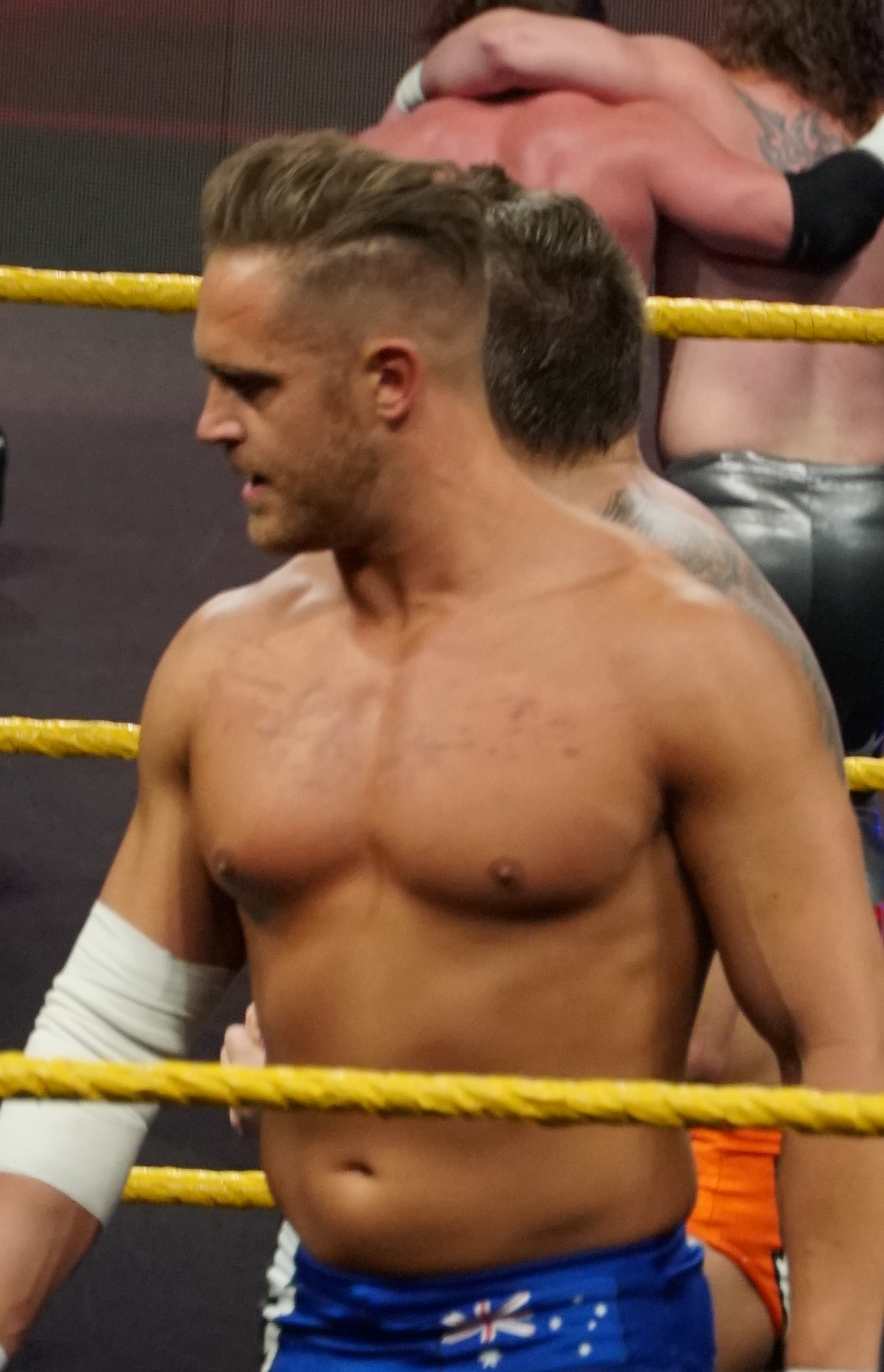
- Nick Miller in April 2018

Personal information
- Born: Michael Nicholls; 20 August 1985 (age 41) Perth, Western Australia, Australia
- Spouse: Danielle McDonald (m. 2017)
- Children: 2

Professional wrestling career
- Ring name(s): Mick Kerrigan; Mikey Nicholls; Nick Miller
- Billed height: 6 ft 1 in (1.85 m)
- Billed weight: 229 lb (104 kg)
- Billed from: Perth, Australia
- Trained by: Davis Storm; Inoki Dojo; Hartley Jackson; Rocky Romero; Naomichi Marufuji
- Debut: November 2001

Michael Nicholls (born 20 August 1985), better known by his ring name Mikey Nicholls, (Note: When wrestling for New Japan Pro-Wrestling, his ring name is written in katakana as マイキー・ニコルス (Maikī Nikorusu).) is an Australian professional wrestler. He works as a freelancer, predominantly for Ring of Honor (ROH) and is a member of The Mighty Don't Kneel (TMDK).

He is best known for his work in Pro Wrestling Noah, where, with Shane Haste, he is a former two-time GHC Tag Team Champion. In New Japan Pro-Wrestling (NJPW), he is a one-time IWGP Tag Team Champion and a two-time Strong Openweight Tag Team Champion with Haste. He has also wrestled in the United States for WWE in their promotion NXT (as Nick Miller), Pro Wrestling Guerrilla (PWG) and Ring of Honor (ROH).

== Professional wrestling career ==
=== Early career (2001–2011) ===
Nicholls started training in Perth at the Dynamite Factory, the wrestling school of Explosive Pro Wrestling. He moved to California and started working for promotions in the United States, such as Pro Wrestling Guerrilla (PWG), NWA Pro, and World League Wrestling.

Nicholls has trained at the New Japan Pro-Wrestling's L.A. Dojo, based in Los Angeles. He wrestled for NJPW in Tokyo in 2006. Also in 2006, Nicholls unsuccessfully challenged for the NWA British Commonwealth Heavyweight Championship.

In June 2007, after NWA split with TNA, Nicholls was involved in the Reclaiming the Glory tournament to crown a new NWA Heavyweight Champion, but was defeated in the tournament by Fergal Devitt. In September 2007, Nicholls defeated champion Karl Anderson and Ryan Taylor in a 30-minute Iron Man match for the Empire Wrestling Federation American Championship. In 2009, Nicholls wrestled for Ring of Honor.

=== Pro Wrestling Noah (2011–2016) ===
On 23 February 2011, Nicholls made his debut in Pro Wrestling Noah as he had a try-out match against his teammate Shane Haste. A month after the try-out match both men started to work full-time with the Japanese promotion. Nicholls competed in both the 2012 and 2013 Global League tournaments as a singles competitor. On 7 July 2013, Haste and Nicholls, known together as The Mighty Don't Kneel (TMDK), won the GHC Tag Team Championship after they defeated Toru Yano and Takashi Iizuka. On 16 September, Nicholls unsuccessfully challenged Kenta for Noah's top title, the GHC Heavyweight Championship. At the end of 2013, the Tokyo Sports magazine named Nicholls and Haste the tag team of the year, making them the first foreign team to win the award since Stan Hansen and Vader in 1998. Nicholls and Haste lost the GHC Tag Team Championship to Maybach Taniguchi and Takeshi Morishima on 25 January 2014. They regained the title from Dangan Yankies (Masato Tanaka and Takashi Sugiura) on 10 January 2015. They lost the title to K.E.S. (Davey Boy Smith Jr. and Lance Archer) on 11 February. On 28 December 2015, Noah announced that Nicholls and Haste would leave the promotion following their contracts expiring at the end of the year. On 11 February 2016, Noah announced that Nicholls and Haste would return to the promotion the following month to take part in a five-show-long farewell tour, entitled "Departure to the World". Their final Noah match took place on 10 March and saw them defeat Naomichi Marufuji and Mitsuhiro Kitamiya.

=== Other promotions (2012–2016) ===
After starting out in Noah, Nicholls returned to the United States and Ring of Honor in February 2012. He and Haste won a tournament at ROH Rise & Prove, defeating two other teams to qualify for a match against the Briscoe Brothers. At the ROH Showdown in the Sun iPPV in March 2012, the Briscoe Brothers defeated Nicholls and Haste in a Proving Ground match.

Also in February 2012, Nicholls and Haste wrestled television matches for NWA Championship Wrestling from Hollywood. Also in March 2012, Nicholls and Haste started wrestling for Ohio Valley Wrestling (OVW), during their stint there, they were defeated in a title match for the OVW Southern Tag Team Championship by Rudy Switchblade and Jessie Godderz.

On 20 December 2014, Nicholls and Haste made their debut for New Japan Pro-Wrestling (NJPW), when they, along with Naomichi Marufuji, were revealed as Toru Yano's tag team partners at Wrestle Kingdom 9 on 4 January 2015. At the event, the four defeated Suzuki-gun (Davey Boy Smith Jr., Lance Archer, Shelton X Benjamin and Takashi Iizuka) in an eight-man tag team match.

=== WWE (2015–2018) ===
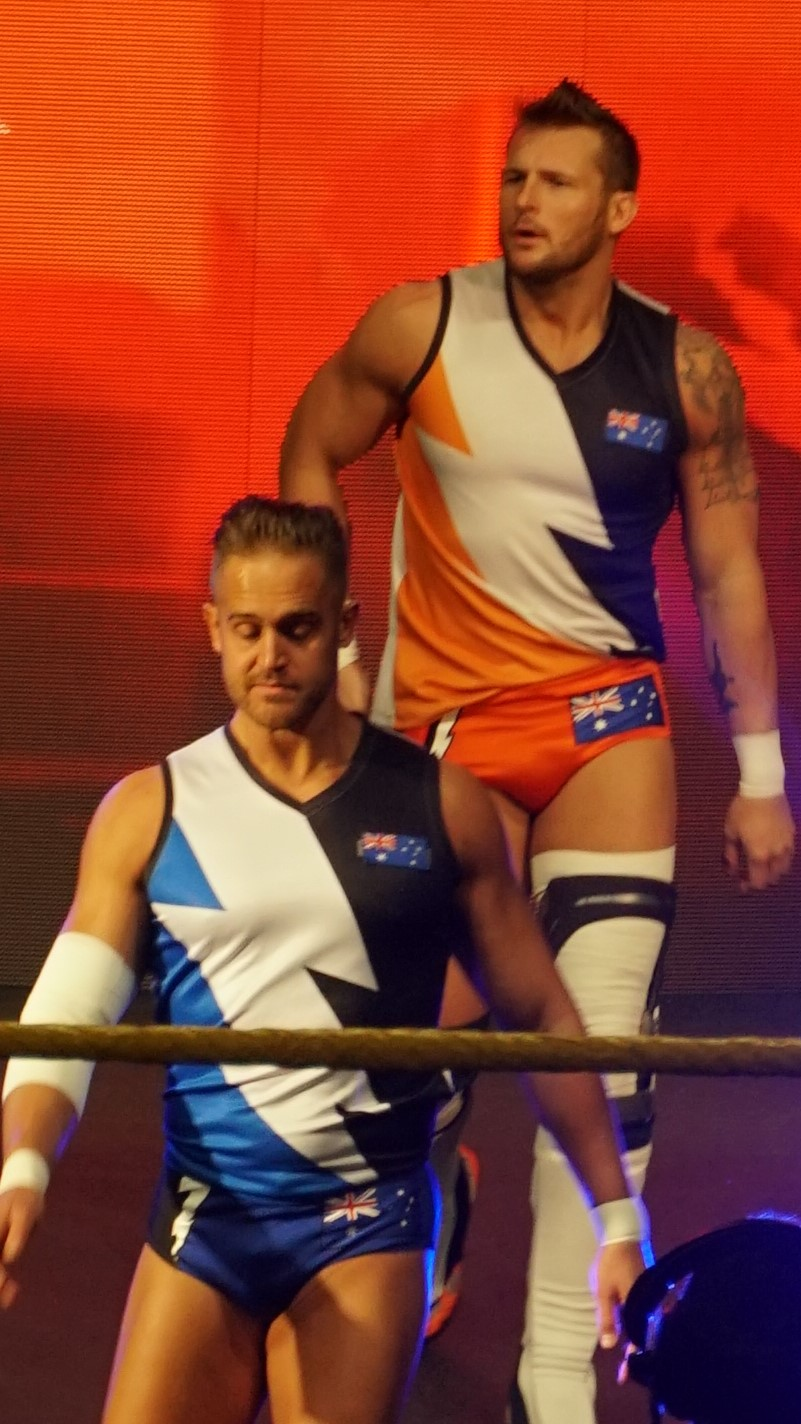
TM-61 (Shane Thorne, back, and Miller) in April 2018

In June 2015, Nicholls and Haste took part in a WWE tryout camp. In February 2016, it was reported that Nicholls and Haste were scheduled to join WWE's NXT brand following their Noah farewell tour.

On 25 March 2016, WWE confirmed the signings of both Nicholls and his tag team partner, Shane Haste. They began training at the WWE Performance Center in April, while working for the promotion's developmental branch NXT. During the 19 May NXT tapings, Haste and Nicholls were renamed Shane Thorne and Nick Miller, respectively, while TMDK was renamed TM-61. On 19 November, at NXT TakeOver: Toronto, TM-61 lost in the finals of the Dusty Rhodes Tag Team Classic to the Authors of Pain. Thorne then had knee surgery, which was expected to sideline him for seven to nine months. He returned on 14 September. TM-61 then entered the 2018 Dusty Rhodes Tag Team Classic, being eliminated by the Authors of Pain in the first round. The team was officially renamed The Mighty on the 6 June episode of NXT. On 14 December, Miller requested and was granted his release from WWE. According to the Wrestling Observer Newsletter, Miller asked for his release in order to spend more time with his family in Australia.

=== New Japan Pro-Wrestling (2019–2024) ===
On 24 February 2019, it was announced that Nicholls would be returning to New Japan Pro-Wrestling (NJPW), and would be competing in the 2019 New Japan Cup. Chaos' Rocky Romero subsequently revealed him as the newest member of the stable. He would defeat Hikuleo in the first round, but would be eliminated by stablemate Kazuchika Okada in the second round. After his elimination, Nicholls participated in six-man matches, usually alongside Juice Robinson, and then later with his fellow Chaos stablemates. On the Road To Wrestling Dontaku tour, Nicholls often partnered Hirooki Goto or Toru Yano in multi-man matches involving Bullet Club. At Wrestling Dontaku 2019, Nicholls was on the winning side of both eight-man matches. On the Kizuna Road tour, Nicholls kept teaming with Robinson, as well as with his Chaos stablemates, continuing their feud with Bullet Club. Towards the end, Nicholls challenged the Guerrillas of Destiny (Tama Tonga and Tanga Loa) for the IWGP Tag Team Championship, and he and Robinson defeated G.O.D. on the final day of the tour to establish them as credible contenders. However, on night one of Southern Showdown, Nicholls and Robinson were defeated by G.O.D. On night two, Nicholls teamed with Yano and Robinson, as they defeated the Bullet Club trio of Tonga, Loa and Gino Gambino; this marked the last time he would be alongside other Chaos stablemates. Nicholls then appeared on the Fighting Spirit Unleashed tour in the United States, and went unbeaten, mostly facing opponents from the L.A. Dojo. On 6 November, it was announced that Nicholls would be competing in the 2019 World Tag League, alongside Jeff Cobb. Nicholls would go on to state that Cobb was an upgrade on Robinson. Nicholls and Cobb finished the tournament in ninth place with sixteen points, ten behind Robinson and David Finlay.

In 2020 and 2021, Nicholls was unable to enter Japan due to COVID-19 travel restrictions. Despite this, on 14 May 2022 at Capital Collision, he appeared for New Japan's American subsidiary, NJPW Strong, where he was reunited with Shane Haste. TMDK and Bad Dude Tito defeated the United Empire, with Nicholls pinning Kyle Fletcher for the win. Nicholls would point to the stable's logo on his tights as Tito joined TMDK. Haste and Nicholls then entered a tournament to become the inaugural Strong Openweight Tag Team Champions, but were defeated in the semi-final to the pairing of Christopher Daniels and Yuya Uemura.

Nicholls returned to NJPW in November teaming with Haste in the World Tag League. The duo finished with a total of 12 points, narrowly failing to advance to the finals.

On 4 January 2023 at Wrestle Kingdom 17, Nicholls competed in the New Japan Ranbo, but failed to last until the final 4. Later in the show, Nicholls and Haste approached Zack Sabre Jr., who had just won the NJPW World Television Championship, and offered him a TMDK shirt, which he accepted, officially joining the stable. The following day at New Year Dash!!, Sabre teamed with Nicholls and Haste to defeat Chaos (Hirooki Goto, Tomohiro Ishii and Yoshi-Hashi). At the event, the trio also added young lion, Kosei Fujita as a new member. The victory at New Year Dash!! caused Nicholls and Haste to be in contention for the IWGP Tag Team Championship, held by Bishamon (Hirooki Goto and Yoshi-Hashi). Haste and Nicholls received their title shot on 5 February at The New Beginning in Sapporo, but were unsuccessful in defeating Bishamon. In April, the duo faced new champions Aussie Open (Mark Davis and Kyle Fletcher) for the titles, but again failed to capture the titles. In July, Nicholls competed in the annual G1 Climax tournament, competing in the C Block. Nicholls finished his tournament campaign with 4 points, failing to advance to the quarterfinal round.

Nicholls' last appearance for NJPW took place in 2024 during the World Tag League tour.

=== All Elite Wrestling / Ring of Honor (2023–present) ===
Due to NJPW's working relationship, Nicholls has made appearances for All Elite Wrestling (AEW) and Ring of Honor (ROH) since 2023, teaming with TMDK stablemates to challenge for the AEW World Trios Championship in 2023 and the ROH World Six-Man Tag Team Championship in 2026, and making an appearance at the one year anniversary episode of Collision in 2024. After leaving NJPW, Nicholls and tag team partner Shane Haste began working for ROH on the tapings of HonorClub in 2026.

== Personal life ==
Since 2017, Nicholls has been married to Danielle McDonald. The couple have two children together.

== Championships and accomplishments ==
- Empire Wrestling Federation
  - EWF American Heavyweight Championship (1 time)
- Explosive Pro Wrestling
  - EPW Heavyweight Championship (3 times)
  - EPW Tag Team Championship (2 times) – with Shane Haste (1) and Davis Storm (1)
  - EPW Match of the Year (2002) vs. Jimmy Payne at Retribution
  - EPW Wrestler of the Year (2004, 2005)
  - EPW Best Wrestler of the first five Years (2006)
  - EPW Telethon Rumble winner (2009)
- New Japan Pro-Wrestling
  - IWGP Tag Team Championship (1 time) — with Shane Haste
  - Strong Openweight Tag Team Championship (2 times) – with Shane Haste
- NWA Pro Wrestling
  - NWA Australian National Heavyweight Championship (1 time)
  - NWA Australian National Championship Tournament winner (2007)
- Pro Wrestling Illustrated
  - Ranked No. 154 of the top 500 singles wrestlers in the PWI 500 in 2016
- Pro Wrestling Noah
  - GHC Tag Team Championship (2 times) – with Shane Haste
  - Global Tag League Fighting Spirit Award (2015) – with Shane Haste
- Ring of Honor
  - Rise and Prove Tournament (2012) – with Shane Haste
- Southern Hemisphere Wrestling Alliance
  - SHWA Tag Team Championship (1 time) – with Davis Storm
- Southern Territory Wrestling
  - STW Ambition Global Championship (1 time)
- Tokyo Sports
  - Best Tag Team Award (2013) – with Shane Haste
