= Lee Marshall =

Lee Marshall may refer to:

- Lee Marshall (announcer) (1949–2014), professional wrestling announcer
- Lee Marshall (footballer, born 1979), English football player
- Lee Marshall (footballer, born 1997), English football player for Swindon Town
- M. Lee Marshall, chairman of Continental Baking Company from 1934 to 1944
