= Empire Wrestling Federation =

Independent wrestling promotion in southern California

- Acronym: EWF
- Founded: 1996
- Headquarters: Southern California
- Founder(s): Bill Anderson; Jesse Hernandez
- Owner: Jesse Hernandez
- Website: https://empirewrestlingfederation.com/

The Empire Wrestling Federation (EWF) is an American independent professional wrestling promotion operating in Southern California. It was founded in 1996 by Bill Anderson and Jesse Hernandez and takes its name from California's Inland Empire. Jesse Hernandez has owned and operated the promotion since Bill Anderson's departure in 1999. EWF is associated with Jesse Hernandez's School of Hard Knocks wrestling school and was formerly affiliated with the National Wrestling Alliance.

EWF began presenting events in San Bernardino and later developed a regular circuit across communities including Covina, Rialto, Riverside, Banning, San Bernardino and Lytle Creek, CA. The promotion has operated continuously since 1996 and marked its 30th anniversary in 2026.

== History ==
=== 1996-1999: The Beginning ===
EWF held its debut event on May 5, 1996, at the Boys and Girls Club of San Bernardino. Bobby Bradley defeated Tom "Zuma" Howard in the main event and later defeated him again on June 16 to become the inaugural EWF Heavyweight Champion. The promotion also held a tribute to Superstar Billy Graham during its first year.

The first EWF Tag Team Champions were the Ghetto Boyz, John Black and Johnny Love, who were recognized on December 6, 1996. By 1997, EWF was promoting monthly events at the San Bernardino Sports Arena; contemporary newspaper coverage described a roster of approximately 25 active wrestlers and fans traveling from around Southern California.

During this period, EWF performers also appeared on national wrestling programming. In 1997, World Championship Wrestling broadcasters Chris Jericho and Lee Marshall mentioned the promotion, and Marshall attended an EWF event in Hemet. At the 1999 WWF Royal Rumble, members of the EWF roster appeared as the orderlies sent to apprehend Kane.

=== 1999-2009: The Legacy ===
Bill Anderson left EWF in 1999 and established the International Wrestling Council and a separate training school in Riverside, CA. Jesse Hernandez retained control of EWF and the School of Hard Knocks. The EWF American Championship was established on March 7, 1999, with Mr. Quick recognized as the inaugural champion.

EWF introduced the Cruiserweight Championship in 2004, with Liger Rivera becoming the first champion in a four-way match. During the mid-2000s, the promotion expanded its recurring tournament and memorial-event schedule. The Great Goliath Battle Royal was established in honor of The Great Goliath, Jesse Hernandez's trainer, and became associated with EWF's anniversary events.

EWF became affiliated with the National Wrestling Alliance in the 2000s, and the School of Hard Knocks was identified as an official NWA training facility in 2007. The promotion's event records from this period include the 10th Anniversary Extravaganza in 2006 and the continuation of the Great Goliath memorial event in 2007.

=== 2010-2025: The Empire ===
The EWF Cruiserweight Championship remained active through March 2011. Ray Rosas was its final champion; the title's recorded history comprises 19 reigns among 14 champions. The Inland Title Tournament, originally organized as a round-robin competition and later as a single-elimination tournament, continued through 2014.

EWF held community and charity events during the period. A March 2012 event at Thompson Elementary School in Highland supported school participation and academic achievement. In April 2016, EWF presented an event at the Fox Theater in San Bernardino benefiting victims of the 2015 San Bernardino attack.

The promotion held its 20th Anniversary Extravaganza in Covina on May 6, 2016. The event included the inaugural EWF Hall of Fame class: Bobby Bradley, Frankie Kazarian and Melina Perez. Independent coverage published before the event described EWF as the only Southern California independent promotion then to have operated continuously for 20 years.

Anthony Idol began his fourth EWF Heavyweight Championship reign on December 19, 2025, defeating Trailer King in Rialto, CA.

=== 2026: 30th Anniversary ===
EWF marked its 30th anniversary in 2026 and presented events across the Inland Empire and neighboring communities. The 30th Anniversary Extravaganza took place at the Fontana-Rialto Elks Lodge #2013, in Rialto, CA, on May 22, 2026.

==== 2026 event chronology ====
Date	Event	City
January 16, 2026	Tomorrow's Not Enough	Rialto, CA
February 20, 2026	Fontana Fight Night	Rialto, CA
March 14, 2026	Battle At The Brewhouse 2026	Covina, CA
March 20, 2026	Revenge Madness	Rialto, CA
April 18, 2026	Riverside Tamale Festival	Riverside, CA
April 24, 2026	The Great Goliath Rumble	Rialto, CA
April 25, 2026	Banning Community Center	Banning, CA
May 9, 2026	La Tardeada - Riverside	Riverside, CA
May 22, 2026	30th Anniversary Extravaganza	Rialto, CA
May 23, 2026	Memorial Day Weekend - Day 1	Lytle Creek, Ca
May 24, 2026	Memorial Day Weekend - Day 2	Lytle Creek, CA
May 30, 2026	Battle At The Bar{n}	Rialto, CA
June 3, 2026	Robidoux Riot	Riverside, CA
June 19, 2026	Summer Blast	Rialto, CA
June 27, 2026	Heatwave Havoc	San Bernardino, CA
July 11, 2026	Freedom 4-Way	Banning, CA
July 17, 2026	Summer Mayhem	Rialto, CA
July 25, 2026	Freedom Slam	San Bernardino, CA
August 8, 2026	Calm Before the Storm	San Bernardino, CA
August 21, 2026	Back to School Bash	Rialto, CA
September 5, 2026	Labor Day Weekend - Day 1	Lytle Creek, CA
September 6, 2026	Labor Day Weekend - Day 2	Lytle Creek, CA

== School of Hard Knocks ==
The EWF School of Hard Knocks is owned and operated by Jesse Hernandez and is currently located at the American Sports University, 399 North "D" Street in San Bernardino, CA. The School of Hard Knocks became the Official Training Facility of the National Wrestling Alliance in 2007 and has trained countless students from such countries as Canada, France, Australia, India, Great Britain, Russia, Mexico and others, in addition to those students who come to the school from all regions of the United States. The EWF's School of Hard Knocks has sent several wrestlers to prominent promotions across the globe including Melina, Rico Constantino, Frankie Kazarian, Awesome Kong, Rocky Romero, Ricky Reyes, Alex Koslov and Shelly Martinez. The School of Hard Knocks also has served as the training area for Chris Jericho, Layla, Eve Torres, Rhaka Khan, Lena Yada and others, who looked to brush up on their in-ring skills. The school and some of its students are set to be promoted in the upcoming reality show, "Slam School".

== Current champions ==
Championship:	Current champion(s):	Won From:	Location:
EWF Heavyweight Championship	Gustavo Perez	Anthony Idol	Rialto, CA
EWF American Championship	The Big Bull	Trailer King	Banning, CA
EWF Tag Team Championship	Micheal Badwolf and Vacant	I-Rod and Erny Valencia	Rialto, CA

== Defunct championships ==
The EWF Cruiserweight Championship was introduced in 2004 and was won by Liger Rivera in a 4-Way match. It was defended from 2004 until it was retired in 2011. It had been featured in the EWF's Match of the Year in both 2009 and 2010. Ray Rosas was the last EWF Cruiserweight Champion. Also defunct was the women's championship belt. It has yet to be brought back into the company.

== Annual events ==
The Empire Wrestling Federation previously held two annual events, the Great Goliath and the Inland Title Tournament. The Great Goliath Battle Royal/Rumble is held in honor of the wrestler who trained Jesse Hernandez, the EWF's owner and promoter, it has been held during the EWF's Anniversary Extravaganza in May since 2006. The winner is awarded a shot at the EWF Heavyweight Championship.

=== Great Goliath Battle Royal/Rumble ===
Won By:	Year Won:	Location:	Notes:
Ray Malvado	2026	Rialto, CA	The debut of the Great Goliath Championship and was presented to Ray Malvado for winning. Holder of the Great Goliath Championship is granted a championship match of their choosing.
Trailer King	2025	Banning, CA	Used his title shot against Michael Badwolf, for the EWF Championship, and won.
Black Metal	2024	Covina, CA	
N/A	2023	N/A	No Great Goliath Battle Royal/Rumble in 2023.
Anthony Idol	2022	San Bernardino, CA	Used his title shot against J2 Mattioli at Jingle slam 2022 & won.
Anthony Idol & Raunchy Rico	2021	San Bernardino, CA	This was for the Vacant EWF Tag Team championship.
Jordan Clearwater	2019	Covina, CA	This was for the Vacant EWF American Championship.
The Decapitator	2018	Covina, CA	He has yet to schedule his title shot.
Friar Juan Roman	2017	Covina, CA	Used his title shot against Fidel Bravo in August of 2017 and lost.
Dr. Krueger	2016	Covina, CA	Never received title shot due to injury.
"Baby Bull" Vance Garayt	2015	Covina, CA	Used his title shot against the Ironman the following month and lost.
Tyshaun Prince	2014	Covina, CA	Used his title shot against the Ironman the following month and lost.
Ironman Mike Maze	2013	Covina, CA	Won the vacant EWF Championship
Joey Ryan	2012	Covina, CA	Last minute surprise entrant
Josh Dunbar/Shaun Ricker	2011	Covina, CA	Both men eliminated each other simultaneously, declared Co-Winners
Chris Kadillak	2010	Covina, CA	
Devon Willis	2009	Covina, CA	Used his title shot at The Covina Classic, winning the match by countout against then champion, Brandon Gatson. Lost their rematch at Knockdown Dragout 3
Ryan Taylor	2008	Covina, CA	Used his title shot at The Covina Classic, losing to then champion, Scorpio Sky.
Dan "The Man" Kobrick	2007	Covina, CA	Used his title shot at The Covina Classic, losing to then champion, Joey Harder.
Cincinnati Red	2006	Covina, CA	Gave the trophy to Great Goliath's daughter, Paloma, and forfeited his right to a title match.

=== Inland Title Tournament / Series ===
Up until 2014 the EWF held the Inland Title Tournament. Originally conceived as a Round Robin Tournament it was later changed to a traditional single elimination format. The winner each year would receive an EWF Championship title match.

- 2006: Joey Harder
- 2007: Brandon Gatson
- 2008: Matt & Nick Jackson
- 2009: SoCal Crazy
- 2010: Tommy Wilson
- 2011: Jeremy Jaeger
- 2012: Sugar Sweet
- 2013: N/A No tournament was held.
- 2014: RJ Ruiz

== Charity events ==
The Empire Wrestling Federation is always giving back to the communities it runs in. On March 10, 2012, the EWF put on a show for the students of Thompson Elementary School in Highland, CA. "Honestly, I see this as a way to keep the families engaged and involved," said Principal Funchess, adding, “This is just a great opportunity for Thompson families to come enjoy a positive event here at the school while supporting academic achievement.”

In 2016 The Empire Wrestling Federation held an event at the Fox Theatre in San Bernardino to benefit victims of the 2015 San Bernardino Attack.

== Hall of Fame ==
In 2016, EWF announced its first hall of Fame inductees, who were inducted in its 20th anniversary show in Covina California. The first Inductees were:

- Melina Perez — Former EWF women's wrestler, and former three-time WWE Women's Champion and two-time WWE Divas Champion. She is also the first woman in WWE history to have held both titles on more than one occasion.
- Bobby Bradley — The first EWF world champion who held the title three times.
- Frankie Kazarian — Former EWF world and Tag Team champion who is most famous for wrestling for Total Nonstop Action Wrestling where he was Five time TNA X-Division and three time TNA Tag team champion. He has held Ring Of Honor tag team championship once with Christopher Daniels and wrestled briefly in WWE.

The 2017 class included:

- Vizzon — three-time EWF World Champion and three Time America Champion despite being legally blind.
- Awesome Kong — Former EWF women's wrestler, Former two time TNA Knockouts Champion, Knockouts tag team Champion, NWA World Women's Champion, WWWA world Women's Champion, and AWA Superstars of Wrestling Women's Champion as well as WWE Diva under the name of Karma. She was Pro Wrestling Illustrated's Woman of the Year in 2008
- Jeff Walton — long time wrestling promoter and manager

The 2018 class included:

- Rick Knox — Legendary Southern California referee
- Los Chivos — Four time EWF world tag team Champions

The 2026 class included:

- Denise Salcedo — Ring Announcer/Backstage Journalist.

== Staff ==
=== Officials ===
- Owner / Promoter: Jesse Hernandez
- Commissioner: Johnny Starr
- Deputy Commissioner: N/A

=== Referees ===
- Senior Official: Nick Lira
- Justin Borden
- JJ Dupree

=== Commentators ===
Commentators:	Dates:
"Mr. Wonderful" Rock Riddle and "Ebony Blade" Eric Anderson	July 2021 – 2024
"Mr. Wonderful" Rock Riddle and Bryan Whyte	July 2016 - July 2021
"Webmaster" Wade Needham and "The Expert" Matt Sinister	October 14, 2011 – July 2016
Kelli Lee and "The Expert" Matt Sinister	July 2, 2011 – October 14, 2011
Lalo Gonzalez, Kelli Lee, and "The Expert" Matt Sinister	June 5, 2011 – July 2, 2011
Lalo Gonzalez and Kelli Lee	N/A – July 2, 2011
Lalo Gonzalez and Larry Pena	2008-2011
Mike Aguirre, Larry Pena, Mad Macintosh, and Lalo Gonzalez	2008
Mike Aguirre, Larry Pena, and Mad Macintosh	2007-2008

=== Ring announcers ===
- Jessica Walters — 2005-2006
- Mike Aguirre — 2005-2007
- Lalo Gonzalez — 2008-2010
- Josh Austin — 2010-2012
- Benjamin Tomas — 2012-2015
- Jake Alexander — 2014, 2025
- Brian White — 2015–2019
- Denise Salcedo — 2016-2020
- Vanessa — 2021-2023
- Jacen Black — 2023–2025
- Rene — 2025-present
- Olivia O — 2026
- Johnny Starr — 2026
- Mike Wexler — 2026-present

== Notable alumni and personnel ==
Wrestlers who appeared for EWF or trained through its associated school and later achieved wider recognition include Rico Constantino, Awesome Kong, Louie Spicolli, Frankie Kazarian, Christopher Daniels, Shelly Martinez, Melina Perez, Rocky Romero, Ricky Reyes and Alex Koslov. Guest appearances over the promotion's history have included Mando Guerrero, The Honky Tonk Man, Tony Atlas and Tom Brandi.

== See also ==
- List of National Wrestling Alliance territories
- List of independent wrestling promotions in the United States
