= Tyler Rust =

American professional wrestler (born 1987)

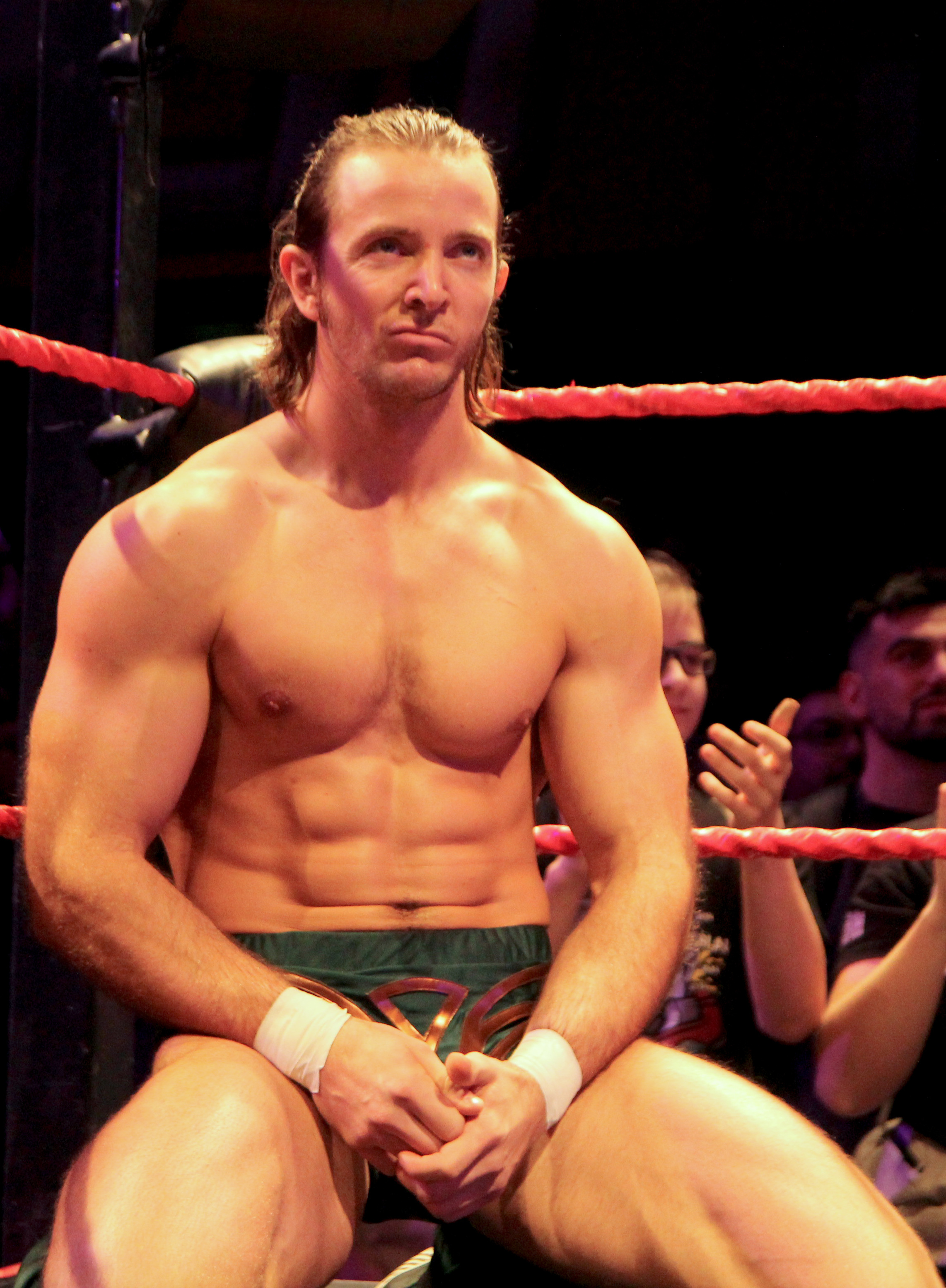
- Taylor at 16 Carat Gold in 2020

Personal information
- Born: Russell Gene Taylor; January 26, 1987 (age 39) Phelan, California, U.S.

Professional wrestling career
- Ring name(s): Ryan Taylor; Rust Taylor; Russ Taylor; Taylor Rust; Tyler Rust
- Billed height: 6 ft 0 in (1.83 m)
- Billed weight: 215 lb (98 kg)
- Billed from: Phelan, California
- Trained by: Jesse Hernandez; Rocky Romero; T. J. Perkins; Cincinnati Red; Taka Michinoku
- Debut: March 27, 2004

Russell Gene Taylor (born January 26, 1987),, better known by the ring name Taylor Rust, is an American semi-retired professional wrestler. He is best known for his tenures with WWE and Ring of Honor (ROH).

== Professional wrestling career ==
=== Empire Wrestling Federation (2004–2020) ===
At 16 years old, he began training at the EWF's training school, Jesse Hernandez's School of Hard Knocks and had his first match for the EWF on March 27, 2004. Taylor wrestled to gain experience and won the 2004 Rookie of the year award in the company. In the spring of 2006, Taylor had his first feud with Joey Harder and after a series of hard matches, Taylor won the EWF Cruiserweight Championship on June 9, 2006. Taylor also won the 2006 Most Improved Award, becoming the first recipient of it. Taylor's reign as the Cruiserweight Champion lasted for 399 days until ending on July 13, 2007, when Markus Riot defeated Taylor in a Best of 3 Falls match to win the EWF Cruiserweight Championship. Ryan won back the EWF Cruiserweight Championship after only 22 days at EFW's Meltdown. Taylor's second reign as the EWF Cruiserweight Champion lasted only 77 days until October 10, 2007, when Maximo defeated Ryan Taylor. In November, Taylor competed in the EWF's Inland Title Series Tournament against J.T. Blackstar, Scorpio Sky and Brandon Gatson. He placed third with a final score of 1–2–0. Taylor also won the 2007 Match of the Year Award for his match against Marcus Riot at the Covina Classic on June 9. In the early part of 2008, Taylor formed a stable known as the KOS alongside Mondo Vega and Hook Bomberry. On August 23, 2008, in San Bernardino, California, Taylor defeated Vizzion in the main event at Flirting With Disaster for the EWF American Championship and new female wrestler Aiden Riley joined the KOS. The KOS then feuded with T. J. Perkins and Liger Rivera until the end of the year in a very intense feud that not only won the Feud of the Year 2008 Award but Taylor would win the Match of the Year 2008 Award for the Belt on a Pole match against Perkins in which Taylor would win the NWA Heritage Championship from Perkins and Taylor won the EWF Wrestler of the Year 2008. Taylor also wrestled the main event of the first ever So-cal supershow featuring the combined companies of EWF and AWS against Perkins and Scott Lost in a triple threat match for the AWS Heavyweight and Light Heavyweight Championships and Taylor's NWA Heritage Championship, in which Taylor retained his title. Taylor held and defended both the EWF American Championship and the NWA Heritage Championship in the early parts of 2009 until losing the Heritage title to Oliver John in a fatal four-way match at the main event of the Cauliflower Alley Club Show after pinning Chris Hero and he lost the American title to Rivera at the EWF's 14th Anniversary Show. On October 30, 2009, after returning from Japan, Taylor defeated Brandon Gatson to win the EWF Heavyweight Championship. Taylor began to feud with his former stable the KOS in late 2009 and the early parts of 2010, ultimately ending with a Street Fight between Taylor and Mondo Vega. Taylor would win the EWF Wrestler of the Year for a second time in 2010. Taylor holds the record for the longest title reign in EWF history at 567 as EWF Heavyweight Champion. On May 20, 2011, Taylor lost the EWF Heavyweight Championship to Johnny Starr. On August 12, he would regain the championship, only to lose it 21 days later to Shaun Ricker. Taylor then participated in Inland Title Series Tournament for a second time in November 2012 and made it to the finals, wrestling 3 matches in 1 night but lost to Jeremy Jaeger. Taylor and Mondo Vega came together again but not as the KOS group, only the two and were collectively known as The Fallen Empire. In 2013, they would win the EWF Tag Team Championship in San Bernardino, that match would win the EWF MOTY for 2013. The two would have 2 championship runs as EWF Tag Champs until losing the belts to Tyshon Prince and Tommy Wilson in January 2015.

=== Early WWE appearances (2008–2009, 2012, 2019) ===
On October 17, 2008, Taylor made his debut for WWE, on its SmackDown brand, where he was defeated by Big Show in a I Quit Match. He returned to WWE on the May 26, 2009, episode of WWE ECW, where he teamed with Joey Munoz and was defeated by Vladimir Kozlov. Taylor would be used by WWE for several commercials promoting SmackDown moving to SyFy Network, working with Kofi Kingston. Taylor also appears in a Don't Try This At Home commercial from WWE, again with Kingston.

In 2012, Taylor was invited to a WWE three day tryout camp, along with other independent notables such as Adam Pearce, Timothy Thatcher and Davina Rose (now known as Bayley).

Taylor would make another appearance in WWE on the June 17, 2019 episode of Raw, teaming with Randy Taylor in a loss to The Viking Raiders.

=== Kaientai Dojo (2009) ===
In 2009, Taylor was heavily involved in Kaientai Dojo. His debut was at 1st Ring in Shinkiba where he was successful in a tag match teaming with Quiet Storm. His first match with KDojo he teamed with Boso Boy Raito and Yuu Yamagata and they were defeated by Omega (Saburo Inematsu, Shiori Asahi and Yuji Hino). He joined Omega that week and wrestled as a part of the top team in Kaientai Dojo. Taylor wrestled in one of HUSTLE's last shows at the Tokyo Dome Hotel. On 3 July 2009, Taylor was defeated by Quiet Storm in a match for the UIWA Light Heavyweight Championship. Taylor made his final appearance for the promotion in his first tour on September 13, 2009, as he teamed with Saburo Inematsu and they were defeated by Monster Plant (KAZMA and Kengo Mashimo).

=== Pro Wrestling Guerrilla (2009–2013) ===
On November 20, 2009, Taylor made his Pro Wrestling Guerrilla debut at the first night of the 2009 Battle of Los Angeles, where he teamed with Malachi Jackson in a losing effort against the Cutler Brothers (Brandon and Dustin Cutler). Taylor continued to perform on every PWG show from 2010 to 2013. Taylor teamed with Roderick Strong at the DDT4 tournament in May 2010, where they were eliminated in the first round by the Cutler Brothers. On September 4, 2010, Taylor entered the 2010 Battle of Los Angeles, but was eliminated in the first round by Brandon Gatson. The following day Taylor formed a new alliance with Chuck Taylor and Brian Cage (who would adopt the ring name Brian Cage-Taylor), called the Fightin' Taylor Boys. From the end of 2010 until summer of 2012, The Fightin' Taylor Boys would do numerous tag team matches and compete in PWG's 2012 DDT4, losing to the RockNes Monsters in the first round. Their final match as a group was Chuck Taylor and Ryan Taylor in mid late 2012. Ryan Taylor's last match for PWG was in 2013 at the 10yr Anniversary show.

=== New Japan Pro-Wrestling (2020) ===
In June, Taylor took part in secret TV tapings at NJPW's Los Angeles Dojo for a new show named Lion's Break Collision. On June 13, Taylor made his New Japan Pro-Wrestling debut as Rust Taylor, teaming with Rocky Romero in a losing effort against TJP and Clark Connors. At the same tapings, Taylor got his first win in New Japan by defeating The DKC.

In November, Taylor returned to NJPW aligning with J. R. Kratos, Tom Lawlor, and Danny Limelight to form the new Team Filthy. The duo of Taylor and Kratos made their tag team debut defeating Rocky Romero and Jeff Cobb. On November 20, Taylor defeated Rocky Romero in his first singles match back in Japan. One week later at NJPW Strong #17, Taylor competed in his last match in New Japan teaming with Kratos, Lawlor, and Limelight in a winning effort against Cobb, Romero, Fred Rosser and P. J. Black.

=== Ring of Honor (2020) ===
On October 2, 2020, Taylor made his Ring of Honor debut as Rust Taylor, competing in the ROH Pure Tournament. In his debut match he lost in the first round to the eventual runner-up Tracy Williams, in a match that was considered one of the best of the whole tournament. Rusts last match with ROH before going to WWE would be a tag match teaming with Dalton Castle vs Rocky Romero and Kenny King.

=== Return to WWE (2020–2021) ===
On December 2, 2020, WWE announced Taylor as a recruit to the WWE Performance Center. That same day, he made his debut on NXT as a heel, in a Thatch-as-Thatch Can segment with Timothy Thatcher as Thatcher's student under the ring name Tyler Rust. Later on in the night, he was seen backstage talking to Malcolm Bivens. After debuting in ring Vs Tommaso Ciampa, Rust and Bivens formed their partnership and Bivens began referring to his new nickname, Diamond in the Rust, as he would gain his first win in WWE on the Christmas Eve episode of NXT vs Ariya Daivari. Rust would work on the NXT weekly show during the first half of 2021 with Bivens, until June 22, when Rust and Bivens were revealed to be a part of the Diamond Mine stable along with Hachiman and Roderick Strong, thus cementing Rust's status as a heel. However, he was released on August 6.

=== Return to ROH and NJPW (2021–2022) ===
Taylor returned to Ring of Honor on September 12, 2021, at Death Before Dishonor XVIII, where he defeated Jake Atlas. Rust would continue to be a part of ROH throughout the rest of 2021 having notable matches against Chris Dickinson, Tracy Williams and the Briscoe Brothers (Jay and Mark). ROH held its final show (before being bought out by Tony Khan) in December 2021 where Rust competed with Team Honor vs Violence Unlimited at Final Battle 2021. Rust would return to NJPW in December 2021 at NJPW Strong: Detonation to surprise his former teammate Tom Lawlor after the main event. Rust however turned on Lawlor, becoming a Face in NJPW and challenging Lawlor for the NJPW Strong Openweight Championship. Lawlor vs Rust for the NJPW Strong Openweight Championship would take place in January 2022 in Seattle, Wa at NJPW Strong: New Beginning. Rust would lose to Lawlor and continue to wrestle for NJPW throughout the rest of 2022, with his last match being an 8-man tag, teaming with his former WWE foe Kushida, along with Rocky Romero and Trent Baretta vs Bullet Club.

=== Hiatus (2022–present) ===
After three years of inactivity in wrestling, it was reported on November 2025 that Rust had taken an indefinite hiatus from wrestling, with no set return date.

== Championships and accomplishments ==
- Championship Wrestling from Hollywood
  - MAV Television Championship (2 times)
  - CWFH Heritage Tag Team Championship (1 time) – with Joey Ryan
  - UWN Tag Team Championship (1 time) – with Tomaste
  - Percy Pringle III Cup (2012)
- Empire Wrestling Federation
  - EWF Heavyweight Championship (2 times)
  - EWF American Championship (1 time)
  - EWF Cruiserweight Championship (2 times)
  - EWF Tag Team Championship (3 times) - with Mondo Vega
  - Great Goliath Battle Royal (2008)
  - Wrestler of the Year (2008)
  - Match of the Year (2008)
  - Match of the Year (2007)
  - Most Improved Wrestler (2006)
  - Rookie of the Year (2004)
- Millennium Pro Wrestling
  - MPW World Championship (1 time)
  - MPW World Title Tournament (2010)
- NWA Championship Wrestling From Hollywood
  - NWA Heritage Championship (1 time)
- Pro Wrestling Illustrated
  - Ranked No. 193 of the top 500 singles wrestlers in the PWI 500 in 2021
- West Coast Wrestling Connection
  - WCWC Heavyweight Championship (1 time)

=== Luchas de Apuestas ===
Wager	Winner	Loser	Location	Date	Notes
Hair	Ryan Taylor	Peter Avalon	Hollywood, California	July 10, 2011	Six man tag team captain's hair vs. captain's hair match, where Taylor, Aaron Bolo and Famous B faced Avalon, Ray Rosas and Rico Dynamite.
