= Jesse Hernandez =

American professional wrestler

Personal information
- Born: Jesse Lizarraga; August 25, 1950 (age 75) San Bernardino, California, U.S.

Professional wrestling career
- Ring name(s): Jesse Hernandez; El Fraile #1; Friar #1; Jesse Cortez; The Intruder
- Billed weight: 235 lb (107 kg)
- Billed from: San Bernardino, California
- Trained by: Great Goliath
- Debut: 1981

Jesse Lizarraga (born August 25, 1950), better known by the ring name Jesse Hernandez, is an American professional wrestler, referee, trainer, and actor.

== Professional wrestling career ==
He is the owner of the independent wrestling organization Empire Wrestling Federation, based in San Bernardino, California. He has trained or helped train wrestlers such as Melina Perez, Rico Constantino, Rocky Romero, Ricky Reyes, Alex Koslov, Kia "Awesome Kong" Stevens, Lena Yada and Layla El. He formed the School of Hard Knocks training facility with Bill Anderson, who left to form his own training camp. In 2006, he was inducted into the Southern California Pro-Wrestling Hall of Fame.

Lizarraga has refereed for promotions including WWF/World Wrestling Entertainment, National Wrestling Alliance, L.P.W.A. Ladies Professional Wrestling Association, Universal Wrestling Federation, and Women Of Wrestling, Paul Alperstein's American Wrestling Federation.

Acting roles for Lizarraga include the films Grunt: The Wrestling Movie, Bad Guys, Frontera Sin Ley, Ed Wood, Body Slam, and the TV series Mad About You.

== Championships and accomplishments ==
- Cauliflower Alley Club
  - Golden Ear Award (2014)
