= UWN Primetime Live =

American professional wrestling television program

- Genre: Professional wrestling
- Created by: David Marquez
- Presented by: Todd Keneley (play-by-play commentator); Alyssa Marino (color commentator)
- Starring: UWN roster NWA roster Independent wrestlers
- Country of origin: United States
- Original language: English
- No. of episodes: 14

Production
- Producer: David Marquez
- Camera setup: Multicamera setup
- Running time: 90 minutes
- Production company: David Marquez Productions

Original release
- Network: FITE TV
- Release: September 15, 2020 – November 20, 2021

UWN Primetime Live was a weekly professional wrestling pay-per-view (PPV) produced by the United Wrestling Network (UWN) and the National Wrestling Alliance (NWA).

== History ==
On August 10, 2020, the United Wrestling Network (UWN) released a statement that they would partner with the National Wrestling Alliance (NWA) to produce UWN Primetime Live, a new series that would be aired via pay-per-view (PPV) providers on a weekly basis from Long Beach, California, at Thunder Studios. On September 15, UWN Primetime Live produced their first event, where the NWA World Heavyweight Champion Nick Aldis successfully defended the title against Mike Bennett in the main event.

On the September 29 edition of UWN Primetime Live, Trevor Murdoch defeated the NWA National Champion Aron Stevens to win the title, marking the first title change at a UWN Primetime Live event. NWA aired the Primetime Live events as a weekly web television program under the Shockwave banner beginning on December 2, 2020. Shockwave aired on NWA's YouTube channel, replacing the time slot previously held by NWA Powerrr, until the end of the NWA-UWN working relationship.

== Episodes ==
No.	Original release date
1	September 15, 2020
No. / Results / Stipulations / Times; 1^{D} / Eli Drake defeated Jordan Cruz / Singles match / —; 2 / Hammerstone (c) defeated EJ Sparks / Singles match for the WCPW Heavyweight Championship / 9:25; 3 / Jordan Clearwater defeated Will Allday / Singles match / 7:48; 4 / Kamille defeated Heather Monroe (with Halston Boddy) / Singles match / 8:15; 5 / The Tribe (Hawaiian Lion and Navajo Warrior) vs. The Wolf Zaddies (Che Cabrera and Bad Dude Tito) ended in a time-limit draw / Tag team match / 9:31; 6 / Chris Dickinson defeated Jordan Cruz / Singles match / 4:38; 7 / Dan Joseph (c) defeated Levi Shapiro (with Howdy Price) / Singles match for the UWN Television Championship / 2:31; 8 / Nick Aldis (c) defeated Mike Bennett (with Maria Kanellis) by technical submission / Singles match for the NWA World Heavyweight Championship / 9:00; (c) / – the champion(s) heading into the match; D / – this was a dark match
2	September 22, 2020
No. / Results / Stipulations; 1 / Kevin Martenson defeated Danny Limelight / Singles match; 2 / Eli Drake defeated Watts / Singles match; 3 / The Real Money Brothers (Clutch Kucera and Sugar Brown) defeated The Friendship Farm (Jervis Cottonbelly and Robin Shaw) / Tag team match; 4 / Karl Fredericks defeated Slice Boogie / Singles match; 5 / Thunder Rosa (c) defeated Priscilla Kelly / Singles match for the NWA World Women's Championship; (c) / – the champion(s) heading into the match
3	September 29, 2020
No. / Results / Stipulations; 1 / SoCal Distancing (Adrian Quest and Andy Brown) (c) defeated The Real Money Brothers (Clutch Kucera and Sugar Brown) / Tag team match for the UWN Tag Team Championship; 2 / Papadon defeated Remy Marcel / Singles match; 3 / Chris Dickinson defeated Anthony Idol / Singles match; 4 / Allysin Kay defeated Nicole Savoy / Singles match; 5 / Ruby Raze defeated Cece Chanel / Singles match; 6 / Robert Baines defeated Jack Cartwright by submission / Singles match; 7 / Trevor Murdoch defeated Aron Stevens (c) / Singles match for the NWA National Championship; (c) / – the champion(s) heading into the match
4	October 6, 2020
No. / Results / Stipulations; 1 / Levi Shapiro (with Howdy Price) defeated Bryan Idol / Singles match; 2 / Lacey Ryan (c) defeated Vipress / Singles match for the FSW Women's Championship; 3 / 4 Minutes of Heat (Eddie Pearl and Ricky Gibson) defeated Beef Candy (Richie Slade and Ricky Mandel) (with Flex McCallion) / Tag team match; 4 / Chris Dickinson defeated Max Caster / Singles match; 5 / The Wolf Zaddies (Che Cabrera and Bad Dude Tito) defeated The Bodega (Danny Limelight and Papo Esco) / Tag team match; 6 / The Pope and Watts defeated Effy and Zicky Dice / Tag team match; (c) / – the champion(s) heading into the match
5	October 13, 2020
No. / Results / Stipulations; 1 / Clark Connors defeated Danny Limelight / Singles match; 2 / Heather Monroe (with Halston Boddy) defeated Elayna Black / Singles match; 3 / Hammerstone (c) defeated Steven Tresario / Singles match for the WCPW Heavyweight Championship; 4 / Fred Rosser defeated Chris Masters and James Storm / Three-way match; 5 / Dan Joseph (c) defeated Dom Kubrick / Singles match for the UWN Television Championship; (c) / – the champion(s) heading into the match
6	October 20, 2020
No. / Results / Stipulations; 1 / Max Caster defeated Jesse James / Singles match; 2 / Miranda Alize defeated Christi Jaynes / Singles match; 3 / SoCal Distancing (Adrian Quest and Andy Brown) (c) defeated The Friendship Farm (Jervis Cottonbelly and Robin Shaw) / Tag team match for the UWN Tag Team Championship; 4 / Mike Bennett defeated J. R. Kratos / Singles match; 5 / The Pope defeated Zicky Dice (c) / Singles match for the NWA World Television Championship; (c) / – the champion(s) heading into the match
7	October 27, 2020
No. / Results / Stipulations; 1 / Ray Rosas (c) defeated Kevin Martenson / Singles match for the CWFH Heritage Heavyweight Championship; 2 / The Bodega (Danny Limelight and Papo Esco) defeated The Real Money Brothers (Clutch Kucera and Sugar Brown) / Tag team match; 3 / Serena Deeb defeated Thunder Rosa (c) / Singles match for the NWA World Women's Championship; 4 / Chris Dickinson defeated Peter Avalon / UWN World Championship tournament first round match; (c) / – the champion(s) heading into the match
8	November 3, 2020
No. / Results / Stipulations; 1 / Lio Rush defeated Fidel Bravo / Singles match; 2 / Fred Rosser defeated Erick Redbeard by disqualification / UWN World Championship tournament first round match; 3 / Heather Monroe defeated Miranda Alize / Singles match; 4 / Shawn Daivari defeated Rocky Romero / UWN World Championship tournament first round match; 5 / Mike Bennett defeated Kevin Martenson / UWN World Championship tournament first round match
9	November 10, 2020
No. / Results / Stipulations; 1 / Chris Dickinson defeated Fred Rosser / UWN World Championship tournament semi-final match; 2 / The Real Money Brothers (Clutch Kucera and Sugar Brown) and Cam defeated 4 Minutes of Heat (Eddie Pearl and Ricky Gibson) and Will Allday / Six-man tag team match; 3 / Lacey Ryan (c) defeated Vipress / Singles match for the FSW Women's Championship; 4 / Aron Stevens and J. R. Kratos defeated Eli Drake and James Storm (c) / Tag team match for the NWA World Tag Team Championship; 5 / Mike Bennett defeated Shawn Daivari / UWN World Championship tournament semi-final match; (c) / – the champion(s) heading into the match
10	November 17, 2020
No. / Results / Stipulations; 1 / Slice Boogie defeated Keita Murray / Singles match; 2 / 1 Called Manders defeated Richie Slade / Singles match; 3 / Lindsay Snow vs. Ruby Raze ended in a double disqualification / Singles match; 4 / Danny Limelight (with Papo Esco) defeated Clark Connors / Singles match; 5 / Ray Rosas (c) defeated Andy Brown / Singles match for the CWFH Heritage Heavyweight Championship; (c) / – the champion(s) heading into the match
11	November 24, 2020
No. / Results / Stipulations; 1 / Dan Joseph defeated Jordan Clearwater and Richie Slade / Three-way match; 2 / Fred Rosser defeated Shawn Daivari / Singles match; 3 / Lio Rush defeated Adrian Quest / Singles match; 4 / Ray Rosas (c) defeated Bad Dude Tito / Singles match for the CWFH Heritage Heavyweight Championship; (c) / – the champion(s) heading into the match
12	December 1, 2020
No. / Results / Stipulations; 1 / Fred Rosser defeated Richie Slade / Singles match; 2 / Davey Boy Smith Jr. defeated Slice Boogie / Singles match; 3 / Kevin Martenson defeated Dan Joseph / Singles match; 4 / Jordan Clearwater (c) defeated Jordan Cruz / Singles match for the CWFH Heritage Heavyweight Championship; 5 / Anthony Idol defeated Levi Shapiro (c) by disqualification / Singles match for the UWN Television Championship; (c) / – the champion(s) heading into the match
13	October 2, 2021
No. / Results / Stipulations; 1 / Juicy Finau defeated Honest John and Vinny Massaro / Three-way match; 2 / Blake "Bulletproof" Troop defeated Jordan Clearwater / Singles match; 3 / David Finlay defeated Will Allday / Singles match; 4 / Alex Coughlin, Clark Connors, and Karl Fredericks defeated Daniel Garcia, Kevin Martenson, and Taylor Rust / Six-man tag team match; 5 / Ruby Raze defeated Viva Van / Singles match; 6 / Midnight Heat (Eddie Pearl and Ricky Gibson) (c) defeated PPRay (Peter Avalon and Ray Rosas) / Tag team match for the DEFY Tag Team Championship; 7 / Chris Dickinson defeated Mike Bennett / Tournament final to become the inaugural UWN World Championship; (c) / – the champion(s) heading into the match
14	November 20, 2021
No. / Results / Stipulations; 1 / Danny Limelight (with Papo Esco) defeated Kevin Knight / Singles match; 2 / Heather Monroe (c) defeated Ruby Raze and Viva Van (with Halston Boddy) / Three-way match for the CWFM Women's Championship; 3 / EC3 defeated Slice Boogie / Singles match; 4 / Papo Esco (with Danny Limelight and Slice Boogie) defeated Levi Shapiro (c) (with Howdy Price) / Street fight for the UWN Television Championship; 5 / Jordan Clearwater won by last eliminating Guy Tweakacetti; The other participants were: AJ Mana, Andrew Everist, Anthony Idol, Aron Stevens, Bad Dude Tito, Blake "Bulletproof" Troop, Dom Kubrick, Flex McCallion, Gentleman Jervis, Honest John, Jack Banning, Ju Dizz, Kevin Condron, Kevin Martenson, Matt Brannigan, Miggy Rose, Peter Avalon, Ray Rosas, Richie Slade, Robert Baines, Robin Shaw, Rob McKnight, Ryan J. Morals, Slice Boogie, Snypes, and Vinny Massaro / 30-Man Red Carpet Rumble match for a future UWN World Championship match; (c) / – the champion(s) heading into the match
