= Danny Limelight =

American professional wrestler

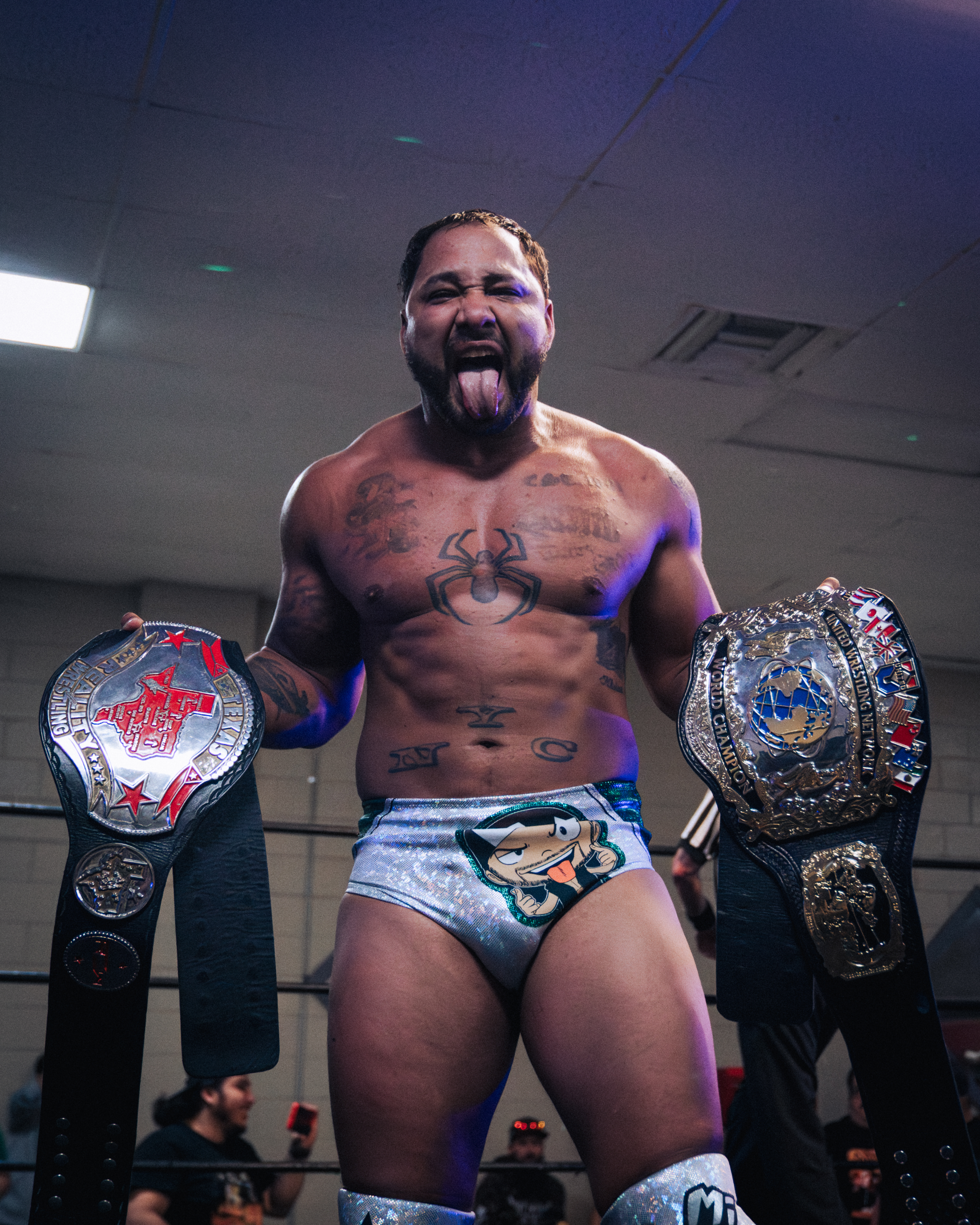
- Limelight in April 2024

Personal information
- Born: Daniel Luis Rivera; September 2, 1991 (age 35) Brooklyn, New York, United States

Professional wrestling career
- Ring name(s): Danny Limelight; Danny Rivera; Rivera
- Billed height: 172 cm (5 ft 8 in)
- Billed weight: 79 kg (174 lb)
- Billed from: Brooklyn, New York
- Trained by: SoCal Pro Wrestling; Championship Wrestling from Hollywood
- Debut: October 11, 2014
- Military service
- Branch: United States Marines Corps
- Service years: 2009–2019
- Rank: Staff Sergeant

Daniel Luis Rivera (born September 2, 1991) is an American professional wrestler. He currently performs on the independent circuit.

== Early life ==
Rivera was a fan of the then World Wrestling Federation's Attitude Era, specifically of The Rock, the D-Generation X stable, and the Hell in a Cell match from Badd Blood: In Your House in 1997.

In 2009, Rivera entered the United States Marines Corps at the age of 17. He achieved the rank of Staff sergeant and worked as a Drill instructor before being administratively separated in 2019 due to his misconduct as a drill instructor.

== Professional wrestling career ==
=== Early career ===
Rivera was inspired to be a wrestler after speaking with Joe Gamble, a wrestler and acquaintance from Rivera's time in the Marines at a WWE live event in San Diego. After initial training with and competing in matches for SoCal Pro Wrestling, Rivera would start wrestling for promotions in Southern California and Tijuana specifically for Championship Wrestling from Hollywood and The Crash Lucha Libre. Rivera would be in the Los Primos Rivera tag team with Gino Rivera in 2016.

=== Championship Wrestling From Hollywood (2019–present) ===
In 2019, Limelight would begin to feature more prominently on Championship Wrestling from Hollywood. He would be on the losing end against Royce Isaacs for the UWN Television Championship and compete in a Fatal Four-Way match with Brandon Cutler, Adrian Quest, and Fidel Bravo at the 2019 Coastline Clash. Limelight was one of a group of wrestlers from Championship Wrestling to compete at Impact Wrestling's Unbreakable event in 2019.

In 2020, Limelight would begin teaming with Papo Esco to form the tag team, the Bodega, becoming UWN Tag Team Champions. In 2021, Limelight and Esco would add Slice Boogie to their group. Together, the trio invoked Freebird Rule to defend the titles until their defeat against the Midnight Heat.

In 2022, Limelight focused more on singles competition. After defeating Willie Mack and Tyler Bateman in the finals of the Golden Opportunity Tournament, Limelight would go on to defeat Jordan Clearwater for the UWN World Championship. Before Championship Wrestling went on hiatus due to the WGA and SAG-AFTRA sticks in 2023, Danny Limelight had successfully defended the World Championship against Clark Connors, Zicky Dice, Tom Lawlor, and Moose. In another defense, he fought Eddie Kingston to a no contest.

=== New Japan Pro-Wrestling (2020–present) ===
Danny Limelight debuted at New Japan Pro-Wrestling's Lion's Break Collision event and was one of the first mainstays on NJPW Strong. Limelight was an entrant in Strong's Lion's Break Crown tournament where he defeated Barrett Brown in the first round and Blake Christian in the semi-finals. Limelight would lose in the finals of the tournament to Clark Connors. Not long after his loss, Limelight would attack Rocky Romero after his match with Rust Taylor and align with Team Filthy. Limelight would feud on and off with Romero, often being on the opposite side of him in tag team matches. Limelight would also face Homicide at Detonation 2022.

=== All Elite Wrestling (2020–2021) ===
On October 21, 2020, Danny Limelight made his All Elite Wrestling debut on AEW Dark on the losing end of a six-man tag team match with Steve Gibki & Tony Vincita against Jurassic Express (Jungle Boy, Luchasaurus, and Marko Stunt). During his time in the promotion, he would be a main stay on Dark and AEW Dark: Elevation, obtaining victories over Fuego Del Sol, Sean Maluta, and Baron Black in singles matches. His fist and only televised AEW match came on the January 6, 2021, edition of AEW Dynamite as he and the Varsity Blondes (Griff Garrison and Brian Pillman Jr.) faced Kenny Omega and the Good Brothers.

=== Major League Wrestling (2021–2022) ===
On July 10, 2021, Danny Rivera, Slice Boogie, and Julius Smokes were introduced by Konnan as members of LAX at Major League Wrestling's Battle Riot III. Eventually, the team would be known as 5150. Rivera and Boogie defeated Myron Reed and Jordan Oliver of Injustice. After feuding with L.A. Park Jr. and El Hijo de L.A. Park, Rivera and Boogie defeated them for the MLW World Tag Team Championships on November 6, 2021. 5150 would defeated for the MLW tag titles against E. J. Nduka and Calvin Tankman (Hustle and Power). Rivera and Boogie would feud with Marshall and Ross Von Erich around this time. Once Hernandez joined 5150, he and Rivera would compete against Hustle and Power and the Von Erichs for the MLW tag titles. Hustle and Power would retain with Rivera taking the pin.

=== International Wrestling Association (2022) ===
As part of an agreement with MLW, Danny Rivera wrestled for International Wrestling Association during their Christmas in PR 2021. Teaming up with Savio Vega, Rivera faced The Owners of Time (Nick Mercer & Leinord White) to a no contest. On January 15, 2022, Rivera and Slice Boogie defeated Mercer and Manny Freno (replacing White) for the IWA World Tag Team Championships in a match where the MLW tag team titles were on the line. 5150 would hold the titles until February 26, 2022, when they would be defeated by Lightning & Mr. Big.

== Filmography ==
=== Television ===
Year	Title	Role	Notes
2022	NCIS	SRT #2	"Pledge of Allegiance"
2024	The Brothers Sun	SWAT Cop	"Gymkata"

== Championships and accomplishments ==
=== Professional wrestling ===
- 907 Pro Wrestling
  - 907 Pro Wrestling Championship (1 time)
- Venue Wrestling Entertainment
  - VWE SoCal Championship (1 time)
- Future Stars of Wrestling
  - FSW Heavyweight Championship (1 time)
  - FSW No Limits Championship (1 time)
- Gold Rush Pro Wrestling
  - GRPW SoCal Championship (1 time)
- Iron Heart Pro
  - IHP Heavyweight Championship (1 time)
- Baja Star's USA
  - Baja Star's USA Cruiserweight Championship (1 time)
- International Wrestling Association
  - IWA World Tag Team Championship (1 time) – with Slice Boogie
- Major League Wrestling
  - MLW World Tag Team Championship (1 time) – with Slice Boogie
- FIST COMBAT
  - FIST Heavyweight Championship (1 time)
- Pro Wrestling Illustrated
  - Ranked No. 286 of the top 500 singles wrestlers in the PWI 500 in 2024
- Reality of Wrestling
  - ROW Texas Championship (1 time)
  - ROW Heavyweight Championship (1 time)
- United Wrestling Network
  - UWN World Championship (1 time)
  - UWN Tag Team Championship (2 time, current) – with Papo Esco (1) and Slice Boogie (1, current)
  - Golden Opportunity Tournament (2022)
- Gold Coast Federation
  - GCF SoCal Championship (1 time)
- Finest City Wrestling
  - FCW XRT Division Championship (1 time)
