= Thunder Studios =

American television studio and arena

- Interactive map of Thunder Studios
- Address: 20434 S Santa Fe Ave
- Location: Long Beach, California
- Coordinates: 33°50′44.3688″N 118°12′39.3264″W
- Owner: Rodric David
- Type: Television studio Arena

Construction
- Opened: 2013

Website
- Official website

Thunder Studios is a video, photography, television production studio, and arena located in Long Beach, California. The building in which the studio resides in was formerly a photo studio for General Motors to allow photographers to capture photos of their vehicles. Rodric David bought the building in 2013 and converted it into a video production studio. The studio has been used for music videos from mainstream artists, advertising campaigns from various companies, and more. The building also features a 1,000-seat arena which has been used for conventions, corporate events, Esports events, mixed martial arts and boxing matches, professional wrestling shows, and concerts.

== Notable events ==
In 2018, the studios were the site of the Cal State Long Beach-organized video game convention Beachcon.

From 2020 to 2021, the National Wrestling Alliance (NWA) and the United Wrestling Network held a series of a series of weekly pay-per-view professional wrestling shows inside the arena titled Primetime Live. These shows would also be aired on tape delay on the NWA's YouTube channel under the NWA Shockwave banner.

On August 16, 2021 New Japan Pro-Wrestling (NJPW) held the 2021 edition of their Fighting Spirit Unleashed show at the arena. The show would be taped in 3 parts for NJPW's weekly streaming television show NJPW Strong.

On April 5, 2025, Major League Wrestling (MLW) held their Battle Riot VII show at the arena. The show was streamed live on MLW's YouTube channel in front of a sold out crowd after it was moved from its initial venue, the Commerce Casino & Hotel in an effort to sell more tickets to fans.
