= NWA Hollywood =

NWA Hollywood may refer to:

- NWA Hollywood Wrestling, a defunct professional wrestling promotion known as "NWA Hollywood" from 1968 to 1982.
- Championship Wrestling from Hollywood, a professional wrestling promotion formerly referred to as "NWA Hollywood".
