= UWN World Championship =

Professional wrestling world championship

Details
- Promotion: United Wrestling Network
- Date established: October 13, 2020
- Current champion: Jordan Cruz
- Date won: July 1, 2025 (aired July 20, 2025)

Other name
- UWN World Heavyweight Championship
Statistics
- First champion: Chris Dickinson
- Most reigns: All Champions (1)
- Longest reign: Danny Limelight (933 days)
- Shortest reign: Jordan Clearwater (208 days)
- Oldest champion: Chris Dickinson (34 years)
- Youngest champion: Jordan Clearwater (24 years)
- Heaviest champion: Chris Dickinson (235 lbs)
- Lightest champion: Danny Limelight (174 lbs)

The UWN World Championship is a professional wrestling world championship owned by the United Wrestling Network promotion. Similar to the "Traveling Champion" concept made famous by the NWA World's Heavyweight Championship, the UWN champion is recognized across the Network's affiliates.

Initially announced in 2014 as the "UWN World Heavyweight Championship", the title was re-introduced on October 13, 2020; along with the announcement of an eight-man tournament to crown the inaugural champion. One year later, on October 2, 2021, Chris Dickinson defeated Mike Bennett on UWN Primetime Live in the finals to become the first champion.

The current champion is Jordan Cruz, who is in his first reign.

== History ==
In the Summer of 2014, it was announced at Championship Wrestling From Hollywood that a tournament to crown the first UWN World Heavyweight Champion would be held.

On October 13, 2020, at UWN Primetime Live, David Marquez revealed the UWN World Championship for the first time. Marquez re-announced a tournament of eight-man to crown the inaugural champion, when the participants of the tournaments would be revealed on the October 20 edition of UWN Primetime Live.

The original lineup featured former WWE wrestler Erick Redbeard (formerly Rowan) versus Watts, Chris Dickinson versus AEW wrestler & Championship Wrestling From Arizona founder Peter Avalon, New Japan Pro-Wrestling young lion Karl Fredericks versus former WWE star Fred Rosser (FKA Darren Young), and Mike Bennett versus Davey Boy Smith Jr. However, for unknown reasons, Watts, Fredericks, and Davey Boy pulled from the tournament. Redbeard ended up facing Rosser, Bennett wrestled Kevin Martenson, and a new match was made between Shawn Daivari and Rocky Romero.

On November 17, 2020, the UWN announced that the finals of the tournament between Bennett & Dickenson were postponed after Dickenson suffered an injury. The tournament resumed on the October 2, 2021 Primetime Live special, where Dickinson defeated Bennett to become the inaugural champion.

=== Tournament Brackets ===
Quarter-final; UWN Primetime Live; 10/21/20 & 11/3/2020
Chris Dickinson	Pin
Peter Avalon
Erick Redbeard
Fred Rosser	DQ
Shawn Daivari	Pin
Rocky Romero
Kevin Martenson
Mike Bennett	Pin

Semi-final; UWN Primetime Live; 11/10/2020
Chris Dickinson	Pin
Fred Rosser
Shawn Daivari
Mike Bennett	Pin

Final; UWN Primetime Live; 10/2/2021
Chris Dickinson	Pin
Mike Bennett	18:19

== Reigns ==
As of October 10, 2025.

Key
No.	Overall reign number
Reign	Reign number for the specific champion
Days	Number of days held
+	Current reign is changing daily

No.	Champion	Championship change			Reign statistics		Notes	Ref.
No.	Champion	Date	Event	Location	Reign	Days	Notes	Ref.
1	Chris Dickinson	October 2, 2021	UWN Primetime Live	Philadelphia, PA	1	227	Defeated Mike Bennett in the finals of an 8-man single-elimination tournament to become the inaugural champion.	
2	Jordan Clearwater	May 17, 2022	Championship Wrestling presented by CarShield	Irvine, CA	1	208	Aired on tape delay on June 26, 2022.	
3	Danny Limelight	December 11, 2022	Championship Wrestling presented by CarShield	Irvine, CA	1	933	Aired on tape delay on December 22, 2022.	
4	Jordan Cruz	July 1, 2025	Championship Wrestling presented by CarShield	Irvine, CA	1	101+	Aired on tape delay on July 20, 2025.	
