= Memphis Wrestling (2021) =

American professional wrestling promotion

- Logo for Memphis Wrestling used since 2023
- Founded: 2021
- Style: Rasslin'
- Headquarters: 3296 Winbrook Drive; Memphis, Tennessee, United States
- Founder(s): Dustin Starr; Maria Starr
- Owner(s): Dustin Starr; Maria Starr
- Parent: Memphis Championship Wrestling, LLC
- Formerly: Championship Wrestling from Memphis
- Predecessor: Memphis Wrestling (2003)
- Website: https://memphiswrestling.tv

Memphis Wrestling
- Also known as: Championship Wrestling from Memphis
- Genre: Professional wrestling Sports entertainment
- Presented by: Dustin Starr; Maria Starr
- Starring: Championship Wrestling from Hollywood roster (until 2021); Memphis Wrestling roster (since 2021)
- Country of origin: United States
- Original language: English

Production
- Executive producer: Dustin Starr
- Production location: Memphis, Tennessee
- Camera setup: Multicamera setup
- Running time: 60 minutes
- Production companies: Memphis Championship Wrestling, LLC

Original release
- Network: WLMT
- Release: 2019 – August 26, 2023
- Network: YouTube
- Release: February 27, 2021 – present
- Network: WMC-TV
- Release: September 1, 2023 – present

Memphis Wrestling, formerly known as Championship Wrestling from Memphis (CWFM), is an American professional wrestling promotion based in Memphis, Tennessee and owned by independent wrestling personalities Dustin and Maria Starr. The promotion has been affiliated with the United Wrestling Network since 2021. The promotion produces its eponymous weekly television program, which has aired on YouTube since 2021 and on WMC-TV since 2023.

== History ==
In 2019, the United Wrestling Network (UWN) began airing its Championship Wrestling from Memphis program as a repackaged version of Championship Wrestling from Hollywood on the WLMT television station in Memphis, Tennessee. The repackaged program was hosted by Memphis-based independent wrestling and media personalities Dustin and Maria Starr. In 2021, Dustin and Maria Starr re-launched Championship Wrestling from Memphis (CWFM) as a full-fledged promotion that would be affiliated with the UWN; on February 14, 2021, CWFM would hold several television tapings at the Top of the Line Banquet Hall in Memphis. CWFM was the first new Memphis-based professional wrestling promotion to produce televised wrestling matches in more than 15 years. The first episode that was taped aired on February 27, 2021 on WLMT. The following episodes would feature the first annual Cobra Cup tournament.

On May 1, 2021, CWFM opened the WrestleCenter, a former warehouse converted into a teleivision studio which has served as the permanent home for promotion since then. In addition to hosting its television tapings, the promotion operates the WrestleCenter as training facility to train future professional wrestlers. In 2022, the promotion and its eponymous weekly television program were re-named to Memphis Wrestling.

On September 1, 2023, Memphis Wrestling moved their weekly program to WMC-TV which would air Friday nights at 11 PM local time.

In November 2024, WWE had announced that they had signed former Memphis Wrestling Tag Team Champion Aaron Roberts to their Independent Development program. On November 5, 2025, Memphis Wrestling announced that Marko Stunt would join the promotion as a full-time member of the roster after retiring in 2024, taking on the role of an on-screen talent and mentor.

On May 25, 2026, Memphis Wrestling announced the opening of their second training facility, the Slaughterhouse Gym in Pontotoc, Mississippi.

== Championships ==
Championship	Current champion(s)	Date won	Days held	Location
Memphis Wrestling Heritage Championship	Marko Harris	October 10, 2026	10+	Jackson, Tennessee
Memphis Wrestling Women's Championship	Xya	September 19, 2026	31+	Memphis, Tennessee
Memphis Wrestling Junior Heritage Championship	Zay Washington	August 22, 2026	59+	Memphis, Tennessee
Memphis Wrestling Internet Championship	Big John Dalton	October 3, 2026	17+	Memphis, Tennessee
Memphis Wrestling Tag Team Championship	Slaughterhouse (Jagged James and Nasty Nick)	August 21, 2026	60+	Memphis, Tennessee
