= NWA Shockwave (TV program) =

American professional wrestling television program

- NWA Shockwave logo
- Genre: Professional wrestling
- Created by: Billy Corgan
- Presented by: Joe Galli
- Starring: NWA roster
- Country of origin: United States
- Original language: English
- No. of seasons: 1
- No. of episodes: 4

Production
- Producers: Billy Corgan (Owner/President); Billy Trask (Director of Television)
- Camera setup: Multicamera setup
- Running time: ~60 minutes
- Production companies: Lightning One, Inc.

Original release
- Network: YouTube
- Release: December 1 – December 22, 2020

NWA Shockwave is a professional wrestling streaming television program produced by the National Wrestling Alliance (NWA). The show began airing on December 1, 2020 on NWA's YouTube channel. The series primarily featured matches taped during United Wrestling Network's weekly pay-per-view series, UWN Primetime Live.

== Episodes ==
| No. | Title | Taped date | Location | Original release date |
|---|---|---|---|---|
| 1 (S1E1) | "Episode 1" | September 15, 2020 – November 10, 2020 | Los Angeles | December 1, 2020 |
Matches: No. / Results / Stipulations; 1 / Eli Drake defeated Jordan Cruz / Singles match; 2 / Kamille defeated Heather Monroe / Singles match; 3 / Nick Aldis (c) (with Kamille) defeated Mike Bennett / Singles match for the NWA Worlds Heavyweight Championship; (c) / – the champion(s) heading into the match
| 2 (S1E2) | "Episode 2" | September 15, 2020 – November 10, 2020 | Los Angeles | December 8, 2020 |
Matches: No. / Results / Stipulations; 1 / Kamille defeated Simone Sherie / Singles match; 2 / Eli Drake defeated Watts / Singles match; 3 / Thunder Rosa (c) defeated Priscilla Kelly / Singles match for the NWA World Women's Championship; (c) / – the champion(s) heading into the match
| 3 (S1E3) | "Episode 3" | September 15, 2020 – November 10, 2020 | Los Angeles | December 15, 2020 |
Matches: No. / Results / Stipulations; 1 / Allysin Kay defeated Nicole Savoy / Singles match; 2 / Elijah Burke and Watts defeated Zicky Dice and Effy / Tag team match; 3 / Trevor Murdoch defeated Aron Stevens / Singles match for the NWA National Heavyweight Championship
| 4 (S1E4) | "Episode 4" | September 15, 2020 – November 10, 2020 | Los Angeles | December 22, 2020 |
Matches: No. / Results / Stipulations; 1 / Elijah Burke defeated Zicky Dice (c) / Singles match for the NWA World Television Championship; 2 / Nick Aldis defeated Jordan Clearwater / Singles match; 3 / Serena Deeb defeated Thunder Rosa (c) / Singles match for the NWA World Women's Championship; 4 / Aron Stevens and J. R. Kratos defeated James Storm (c) and Eli Drake (c) / Tag team match for the NWA World Tag Team Championship; (c) / – the champion(s) heading into the match
