= Championship Wrestling from Atlanta =

American defunct United Wrestling Network professional wrestling territory

- Logo for Championship Wrestling from Atlanta from 2021 to 2022
- Founded: 2021
- Defunct: 2022
- Style: Rasslin'
- Headquarters: 425 14th Street Northwest, Atlanta, Georgia, United States
- Founder: David Marquez
- Owner: David Marquez
- Parent: Championship Television

Championship Wrestling from Atlanta
- Also known as: Championship Wrestling from Atlanta
- Genre: Professional wrestling
- Created by: David Marquez
- Starring: Championship Wrestling from Atlanta roster
- Country of origin: United States
- Original language: English
- No. of episodes: 13

Production
- Executive producer: David Marquez
- Camera setup: Multicamera setup
- Running time: 60 minutes
- Production companies: David Marquez Productions; Championship Television

Original release
- Network: First-run syndication YouTube
- Release: September 18 – December 12, 2021

Championship Wrestling from Atlanta was a United Wrestling Network (UWN) territory created by David Marquez. The territory's eponymous weekly television program aired from September 18 to December 12, 2021, in first-run syndication in the United States and on YouTube worldwide.

== History ==
During the Summer of 2021, UWN announced the launch of Championship Wrestling from Atlanta, which would air on Peachtree TV, and be taped from the Center Stage Theater in Atlanta, Georgia. On July 15, 2021, David Marquez announced on Twitter that Championship Wrestling from Atlanta would premiere on Saturday September 2 at 10 p.m The first episode aired on September 18, 2021 with the main event being between Matt Rehwoldt and Ashton Starr. On October 2, 2021, UWN taped an episode of Championship Wrestling from Atlanta at the Commerce Casino in Commerce, California.

By December 19, 2021, Championship Wrestling from Atlanta had shifted from airing taped matches from their tapings in the Atlanta area to being a repackaged version of Championship Wrestling from Hollywood. On February 17, 2022, UWN announced in a press release that they will be merging Championship Wrestling from Hollywood, Championship Wrestling from Arizona and Championship Wrestling from Atlanta into a singular entity under the Championship Wrestling presented by CarShield branding. The first taping for the new show took place at the Irvine Improv in Irvine, California on March 22, marking the end of the Championship Wrestling from Atlanta program.
