= List of New Japan Pro-Wrestling tournaments =

New Japan Pro-Wrestling had held a variety of professional wrestling tournaments competed for by wrestlers that are a part of their roster.

== Sporadic tournaments ==
Pin-Pinfall; Sub-Submission; CO-Countout; DCO-Double countout; DQ-Disqualification; DDQ-Double Disqualification Ref-Referee's decision; NC-No Contest

=== 1974 Karl Gotch Cup ===
The 1974 Karl Gotch Cup was a round-robin tournament held from October 25 until December 8. The tournament featured 8 participants. The tournament was held during the Toukon Series II tour. The winner of the tournament was Tatsumi Fujinami, who defeated Masashi Ozawa to win the tournament. Fujinami would later become a Japanese legend having success in both the junior heavyweight and heavyweight divisions. He would later become a six times IWGP Heavyweight Champion and also won the G1 Climax. Later he was abroad, to Mexico's Universal Wrestling Association and to Jim Crockett Promotions in the U.S.

Final standings
Masashi Ozawa	7
Tatsumi Fujinami	7
Takashi Kimura	6
Yoshiaki Fujiwara	5
Makoto Arakawa	3.5
Masanobu Kurisu	3.5
Little Hamada	3
Donald Takeshi	1
Daigoro Oshiro	0

Final
1	Masashi Ozawa	10:37
2	Tatsumi Fujinami	Pin

=== Vacant IWGP Heavyweight Championship tournament ===
A tournament for the vacant IWGP Heavyweight Championship was held on April 24, 1989.

=== Kyushu Cup ===
The Kyushu Cup was a four-man tournament, which took place on June 12, 1990.

Semifinals
Shinya Hashimoto
Kensuke Sasaki
Keiji Mutoh
Masahiro Chono

Final
Shinya Hashimoto
Keiji Mutoh

=== IWGP Junior Heavyweight Title Tournament ===
Single elimination tournament that took place in a single night on September 27, 1994 to crown a new IWGP Junior Heavyweight Champion after reigning champion Jushin Thunder Liger suffered an ankle injury.

Results

Round 1
Norio Honaga
Gran Hamada	10:48
Shinjiro Otani
BYE
Black Tiger
El Samurai	9:27
Wild Pegasus
BYE

Semifinals
Norio Honaga
Shinjiro Otani	12:30
Black Tiger
Wild Pegasus	10:40

Final
Norio Honaga
Wild Pegasus	12:34

=== Japan/US All Star Tournament ===
The Japan/US All Star Tournament was an interpromotional single-elimination tournament pitting NJPW wrestlers against World Championship Wrestling wrestlers. The tournament took place during the 1996 G1 Climax.

First Round
Shinya Hashimoto
Marcus Alexander Bagwell
Satoshi Kojima
Lord Steven Regal
Shiro Koshinaka
Hugh Morrus
Masahiro Chono
Sting
Hiroyoshi Tenzan
Arn Anderson
Riki Choshu
Scott Norton
Ric Flair
Tatsumi Fujinami
Kensuke Sasaki
Lex Luger

Quarterfinals
Shinya Hashimoto
Lord Steven Regal
Shiro Koshinaka
Sting
Hiroyoshi Tenzan
Scott Norton
Ric Flair
Kensuke Sasaki

Semifinals
Shinya Hashimoto
Shiro Koshinaka
Scott Norton
Kensuke Sasaki

Final
Shiro Koshinaka
Kensuke Sasaki

=== G2 U-30 Climax Tournament 2003 ===
The G2 U-30 Climax Tournament 2003 was a tournament.

=== Yuko Six Man Tag Team Tournament ===
The Yuko Six Man Tag Team Tournament was a tournament.

Semifinals
Ryota Chikuzen, Katsuyori Shibata and Mitsuya Nagai
Hiro Saito, Tatsutoshi Goto and Toru Yano	9:40
Blue Wolf, Katsuhiko Nakajima and Shinsuke Nakamura
Hiroshi Tanahashi, Togi Makabe and Yutaka Yoshie	15:03

Final
Ryota Chikuzen, Katsuyori Shibata and Mitsuya Nagai
Blue Wolf, Katsuhiko Nakajima and Shinsuke Nakamura	11:15

=== President Hoshino 10 Million Yen Offer Tag Tournament ===
The President Hoshino 10 Million Yen Offer Tag Tournament was a tournament.

Semifinals
Katsuyori Shibata and Masahiro Chono
Genichiro Tenryu and Kensuke Sasaki	17:53
Hiroyoshi Tenzan and Shinsuke Nakamura
Mitsuya Nagai and Toshiaki Kawada	20:53

Final
Katsuyori Shibata and Masahiro Chono
Hiroyoshi Tenzan and Shinsuke Nakamura	19:28

=== U-30 One Night Tag Tournament ===
The U-30 One Night Tag Tournament was a tournament.

Semifinals
Ryusuke Taguchi and Shinsuke Nakamura
Hirooki Goto and Katsuyori Shibata	11:44
Hiroshi Tanahashi and Taiji Ishimori
Blue Wolf and Katsuhiko Nakajima	13:30

Final
Ryusuke Taguchi and Shinsuke Nakamura
Hiroshi Tanahashi and Taiji Ishimori	14:49

=== Samurai! TV Openweight Tag Team Tournament ===
The Samurai! TV Openweight Tag Team Tournament was a tournament.

Semifinals
Shinsuke Nakamura and Wataru Inoue
Minoru Tanaka and Togi Makabe	13:03
Hirooki Goto and Yuji Nagata
Hiroshi Tanahashi and Koji Kanemoto	15:08

Final
Shinsuke Nakamura and Wataru Inoue
Hirooki Goto and Yuji Nagata	21:03

=== Yuke's Cup PREMIUM One Night Tag Tournament ===
The Yuke's Cup PREMIUM One Night Tag Tournament was a tournament.

=== J Sports Crown Openweight Six Man Tag Team Tournament 2010 ===
The J Sports Crown Openweight Six Man Tag Team Tournament 2010 was a tournament.

=== J Sports Crown Openweight Six Man Tag Team Tournament 2011 ===
The J Sports Crown Openweight Six Man Tag Team Tournament 2011 was a tournament.

=== IWGP Intercontinental Championship Tournament ===
On April 8, 2011, NJPW announced the participants in the tournament to crown the first IWGP Intercontinental Champion. The list of participants included former World Wrestling Entertainment performer MVP, who had signed a contract with NJPW in January 2011, Kazuchika Okada, who had been on a learning excursion to American promotion Total Nonstop Action Wrestling (TNA) since February 2010, Hideo Saito, who had been on a similar tour of Puerto Rican World Wrestling Council since September 2010, former IWGP Tag Team and IWGP Junior Heavyweight Tag Team Champions Tetsuya Naito and Yujiro Takahashi of No Limit, NJPW regulars Tama Tonga and Toru Yano and American independent worker Dan Maff, who made his first appearance for NJPW during the tour. On May 6 it was announced that Tonga had suffered an injury, which would force him out of the tournament. He would be replaced by former TNA and Ring of Honor performer Josh Daniels. On May 15, MVP defeated Yano in the final of the tournament to become the inaugural champion.

Tournament bracket

Round One (May 13)
MVP	Sub
Kazuchika Okada	12:45
Josh Daniels	Pin
Tetsuya Naito	12:28
Dan Maff	Pin
Toru Yano	10:38
Hideo Saito	Pin
Yujiro Takahashi	08:28

Semifinals (May 14)
MVP	Sub
Tetsuya Naito	10:57
Toru Yano	Pin
Yujiro Takahashi	07:47

Final (May 15)
MVP	Sub
Toru Yano	09:27

=== NEVER Openweight Championship Tournament ===
On October 5, 2012, over two years after the founding of NEVER, New Japan Pro-Wrestling announced the creation of the project's first championship, the NEVER Openweight Championship. The title was originally created with the idea of using it to "elevate younger wrestlers". The first champion was to be determined in a sixteen-man single-elimination tournament, which was set to take place November 15 and 19, 2012. The title and the tournament were announced by New Japan president Naoki Sugabayashi and NEVER regular Tetsuya Naito, who was scheduled to enter the tournament, but was forced to pull out after suffering a knee injury. Much like regular NEVER events, the tournament also featured wrestlers not signed to New Japan; freelancer Daisuke Sasaki, Hiro Tonai, Kengo Mashimo, Ryuichi Sekine, Shiori Asahi and Taishi Takizawa from Kaientai Dojo, and Masato Tanaka from Pro Wrestling Zero1. The entire first round of the tournament took place on November 15 and saw Shiori Asahi, Yoshi-Hashi, Taishi Takizawa, Ryusuke Taguchi, Tomohiro Ishii, Kengo Mashimo, Karl Anderson and Masato Tanaka advance. The rest of the tournament took place four days later. During the second round, Kengo Mashimo defeated Ryusuke Taguchi, Karl Anderson defeated Shiori Asahi, Masato Tanaka defeated Taishi Takizawa, Tomohiro Ishii defeated Yoshi-Hashi. The semifinals saw Anderson defeat Mashimo and Tanaka defeat Ishii. In the final of the tournament, Tanaka, the 39-year-old, who, despite officially being affiliated with Pro Wrestling Zero1, had worked for NJPW regularly since August 2009, defeated Anderson to become the inaugural NEVER Openweight Champion. Though the title was originally designed to be defended at NEVER events, NJPW has not held a single NEVER event since the championship tournament.

First round (November 15)
Karl Anderson	Pin
Yujiro Takahashi	11:12
Hiromu Takahashi	Pin
Shiori Asahi	06:14
Ryusuke Taguchi	Pin
Hiro Tonai	08:19
Bushi	Pin
Kengo Mashimo	08:02
Kushida	Pin
Masato Tanaka	13:02
Captain New Japan	Pin
Taishi Takizawa	07:22
Tomohiro Ishii	Pin
Daisuke Sasaki	08:39
Yoshi-Hashi	Pin
Ryuichi Sekine	07:14

Second round (November 19)
Karl Anderson	Pin
Shiori Asahi	03:59
Ryusuke Taguchi	Sub
Kengo Mashimo	07:54
Masato Tanaka	Pin
Taishi Takizawa	04:28
Tomohiro Ishii	Pin
Yoshi-Hashi	06:57

Semifinals (November 19)
Karl Anderson	Pin
Kengo Mashimo	06:14
Masato Tanaka	Pin
Tomohiro Ishii	10:47

Final (November 19)
Karl Anderson	Pin
Masato Tanaka	15:12

=== Vacant NEVER Openweight 6-Man Tag Team Championship ===
On August 1, 2020, NJPW announced a tournament to crown new NEVER Openweight 6-Man Tag Team Champions.

1st Round (August 6, 7)
Chaos (Kazuchika Okada, Toru Yano, & Sho)	Sub
Bullet Club (Gedo, Jado, & Yujiro Takahashi)	12:03
Los Ingobernables de Japón (Shingo Takagi, Bushi, & Sanada)	Pin
Suzuki-gun (Minoru Suzuki, El Desperado, & Douki)	13:37
Hiroshi Tanahashi, Kota Ibushi, & Master Wato	Pin
Suzuki-gun (Taichi, Zack Sabre Jr., & Yoshinobu Kanemaru)	16:53
Togi Makabe, Tomoaki Honma, & Ryusuke Taguchi	11:53
Chaos (Hirooki Goto, Tomohiro Ishii, & Yoshi-Hashi)	Sub

Semifinals (August 8)
Chaos (Kazuchika Okada, Toru Yano, & Sho)	Pin
Los Ingobernables de Japón (Shingo Takagi, Bushi, & Sanada)	13:07
Hiroshi Tanahashi, Kota Ibushi, & Master Wato	17:11
Chaos (Hirooki Goto, Tomohiro Ishii, & Yoshi-Hashi)	Pin

Final (August 9)
Chaos (Kazuchika Okada, Toru Yano, & Sho)	24:18
Chaos (Hirooki Goto, Tomohiro Ishii, & Yoshi-Hashi)	Pin

=== Inaugural KOPW Championship ===
NJPW announced a tournament to Crown the inaugural KOPW Champion.

No.	Results	Stipulations	Times
1	El Desperado defeated Satoshi Kojima by disqualification	No finisher match	14:13
2	Toru Yano defeated Bushi	Two-count Pinfalls match	4:44
3	Sanada defeated Sho by submission	Submission match	19:37
4	Kazuchika Okada defeated Bullet Club (Yujiro Takahashi, Jado, & Gedo) by submission	1 vs 3 handicap match	15:26

=== Vacant IWGP Junior Heavyweight Tag Team Championship ===
On August 31, 2020, NJPW announced a league tournament to crown new IWGP Junior Heavyweight Tag Team Champions on the New Japan Road tour.

Final standings
El Desperado and Yoshinobu Kanemaru	4
Bushi and Hiromu Takahashi	4
Ryusuke Taguchi and Master Wato	2
Taiji Ishimori and Gedo	2

Results	Taguchi and Wato	Bushi and Takahashi	Desperado and Kanemaru	Ishimori and Gedo
Taguchi and Wato	–	Takahashi and Bushi (18:02)	Taguchi and Wato (13:26)	Ishimori and Gedo (14:34)
Bushi and Takahashi	Bushi and Takahashi (18:02)	–	Desperado and Kanemaru (17:15)	Bushi and Takahashi (20:54)
Desperado and Kanemaru	Taguchi and Wato (13:26)	Desperado and Kanemaru (17:15)	–	Desperado and Kanemaru (16:48)
Ishimori and Gedo	Ishimori and Gedo (14:34)	Bushi and Takahashi (20:54)	Desperado and Kanemaru (16:48)	–

Final
1	Suzuki-gun (El Desperado and Yoshinobu Kanemaru)	Pin
2	Los Ingobernables de Japón (Bushi and Hiromu Takahashi)	17:12

=== Lion's Break Crown ===
Lion's Break Crown was a tournament that took place between September 25, 2020 and October 9, 2020 on NJPW Strong.

Round 1 (September 25)
Logan Riegel	Pin
The DKC	6:31
Clark Connors	Sub
Jordan Clearwater	6:11
Danny Limelight	Pin
Barrett Brown	9:31
Adrian Quest	6:49
Blake Christian	Pin

Semifinals (October 2)
Logan Riegel	7:51
Clark Connors	Sub
Danny Limelight	Pin
Blake Christian	7:54

Final (October 9)
Clark Connors	Sub
Danny Limelight	12:36

== Annually held tournaments ==
Tournament	Last winner(s)	Last held	Type	Created	Notes
G1 Climax	Ryohei Oiwa	August 16, 2026	Heavyweight	1974	NJPW's biggest annual tournament, primarily for heavyweights but there is no official weight limit. Mostly in a round-robin format (Note: Before the G1 Climax, NJPW had had an annual single tournament since 1974 under various names: the World League (1974–77), the Madison Square Garden (MSG) League (1978–82), the International Wrestling Grand Prix (IWGP) League (1983–88) and the World Cup Tournament (1989).)
World Tag League	TMDK (Zack Sabre Jr. and Ryohei Oiwa)	December 14, 2025	Tag team	1980	NJPW's annual tag team round-robin tournament. (Note: Before the World Tag League, NJPW had had an annual tag tournament since 1980 under various names; the Madison Square Garden (MSG) Tag League (1980–85), the Japan Cup Tag League (1986–87), the Super Grade Tag League (1991–98) and the G1 Tag League (1999–2011).)
New Japan Cup	Callum Newman	March 21, 2026	Openweight	2005	Single-elimination tournament
Best of the Super Juniors	Yoh	June 7, 2026	Junior heavyweight	1988	Annual round-robin tournament featuring top junior heavyweights from all over the world.
Super J-Cup	El Phantasmo	December 12, 2020	Junior heavyweight	1994	Sporadic single-elimination tournament featuring top junior heavyweights from all over the world. The tournament has been hosted by other promotions than NJPW as well.
Super Jr. Tag League	House of Torture (Sho and Douki)	November 2, 2025	Junior heavyweight tag team	2010	Sporadic tournament featuring junior heavyweight tag teams from all over the world. (Note: NJPW has previously held similar tournaments for junior heavyweight tag teams, the first being the Junior Heavyweight Super Grade Tag League in 1996, won by Eddie Guerrero as Black Tiger II and The Great Sasuke. They also held the G1 Junior Tag League in 2001: it was won by El Samurai and Jyushin Thunder Liger. On May 8, 2010, NJPW also held a one night, single-elimination tournament, under the name Super J Tag Tournament 1st, which was won by El Samurai and Koji Kanemoto. On November 13, 2010, NJPW held the Super J Tag League, a round-robin tournament, which was won by Jado and Gedo.)

== See also ==
- Professional wrestling tournament
