= Ray Rosas =

Mexican-American professional wrestler (born 1986)

Personal information
- Website: www.rayrosas.com

Professional wrestling career
- Ring name(s): El Galan; Ray Rosas; Ray Rose; Ricardo Rojas; The Santino Kid
- Billed height: 5 ft 8 in (173 cm)
- Billed weight: 202 lb (92 kg)
- Billed from: Antelope Valley
- Trained by: Joey Kaos; Supreme
- Debut: April 4, 2009

Ray Rosas is an American professional wrestler, who is currently working for several independent wrestling promotions but is best known for his work with Championship Wrestling from Hollywood. He was trained at Santinos Bros Academy and was the final EWF Cruiserweight Champion.

== Professional Wrestling Career ==
=== Empire Wrestling Federation (2010–present) ===
Rosas made his Pro Wrestling debut in the Empire Wrestling Federation Where he was defeated by Orion. On 13 June 2010, Rosas win his first Pro Wrestling Championship When he defeated Brandon Parker to Win the EWF Cruiserweight Championship. On 23 July 2010, Rosas defeated Peter Avalon to retain the EWF Cruiserweight Championship. On 13 March 2011, Ray Rosas lost the EWF Cruiserweight Title to Eddie Matson. On 10 June 2011, Rosas was defeated by Little Friar. On 6 July 2012, Rosas was defeated by Johny Paradise.

On 1 November 2013, Rosas teamed with Peter Avalon Under the team Name PPRay Where they Unsuccessfully Challenged the EWF Tag Team Championship from The Von Dooms (Cyanide & The Vintage Dragon). On 7 February 2014, Rosas and Avalon defeated B-Boy & Mondo Vega.

=== Championship Wrestling From Hollywood (2010–present) ===
On 25 August 2010, Rosas made his Championship Wrestling From Hollywood Where he was defeated by Joey Kaos. On 8 December 2010, Rosas was defeated by Famous B. On 12 February 2011, Rosas was defeated by Ryan Taylor. On 6 November 2011, Rosas defeated Ryan Taylor. On 12 February 2012, Rosas was defeated by Terex in a Steel Cage Match.

On 21 July 2013, PPRay defeated Los Bandidos (Rico Dynamite & Tito Escondido) to win the CWFH Heritage tag team Championship. On 26 January 2014, PPRay defeated The Revolution to retain the CWFH Heritage Tag Team Championship.

On the November 27, 2021 episode of UWN Primetime Live Championship Wrestling from Georgia, he lost to Kevin Martenson. After the match, he continued to attack Martenson before UWN Heritage Champion Jordan Cruz broke things up.

=== Pro Wrestling Guerrilla (2011–2014) ===
On 22 October 2011, Rosas made his PWG debut Where he teamed with Peter Avalon & Freddy Bravo and were defeated by Candice LeRae, Chris Kadillak & Famous B. On 10 December 2011, Rosas returned to PWG where he teamed with Peter Avalon & The Dynasty (Joey Ryan & Scorpio Sky Where they defeated B-Boy, Candice LeRae, Chris Kadillak & Famous B in 8 Man tag team Elimination Match. On 17 March 2012, Rosas wrestled his first singles match for the promotion where he was defeated by Brian Cage. On 19 October 2013, Rosas and Avalon defeated B-Boy & Willie Mack. On 31 January 2014, Rosas participated in DDT4 2014 with Peter Avalon where they were defeated by Unbreakable F'N Machines (Brian Cage & Michael Elgin.

=== Millennium Pro Wrestling (2017) ===
On 3 February 2017, Rosas made his Millennium Pro Wrestling debut losing by countout to Hobo. Rosas defeated Hobo in their rematch on 17 March. At MPW's California Classic event on 1 April, Rosas and HATE stablemate Mondo Vega wrestled James Angel (better known as James Willems) and Lawrence "The Troll" Sakamoto (better known as Lawrence Sonntag), members of the comedy/gaming YouTube channel Funhaus, in a tag match which was additionally Angel and Sakamoto's pro wrestling debut. Rosas and Vega won the match however Rosas lost his MPW National Title match against Osiris Mittens that immediately followed.

== Championships and accomplishments ==
- Alternative Wrestling Show
  - AWS Light Heavyweight Championship (1 time)
  - AWS Tag Team Championship (3 times) - with Peter Avalon
  - Race for the Ring Tag Team Tournament (2015) - with Peter Avalon.
- BattleGround Pro Wrestling
  - BPW Ring Warrior Championship (1 time)
  - BPW Tag Team Championship (1 time) - with Lucha Machine
- Championship Wrestling From Arizona
  - Arizona State Heavyweight Championship (1 time)
- Championship Wrestling From Hollywood
  - CWFH Heritage Tag Team Championship (3 time) - with Peter Avalon
  - Hollywood Heritage Championship (1 time)
  - UWN Television Championship (1 time)
- Empire Wrestling Federation
  - EWF Cruiserweight Championship (1 time, final)
  - Rookie of the Year (2010)
  - Match of the Year (2010) vs. Jeremy Jaeger in TLC Match at Jingle Slam
- Hybrid Pro Wrestling
  - HPW Heavyweight Championship (1 time, current)
- Insane Wrestling League
  - IWL Heavyweight Championship (1 time)
  - IWL Anarchy Championship (1 time)
- Millenium Pro Wrestling
  - MPW Heavyweight Championship (1 time)
  - MPW National Championship (1 time)
  - MPW Tag Team Championship (1 time) - with Dan Joseph
- Underground Empire Wrestling
  - UEW Heavyweight Championship (1 time)
- New Wave Pro Wrestling
  - NWPW Tag Team Championship (1 time) - with Lucha Machine
- Pro Wrestling Illustrated
  - PWI ranked him #385 of the top 500 singles wrestlers in the PWI 500 in 2013
  - PWI ranked him #356 of the top 500 singles wrestlers in the PWI 500 in 2015
  - PWI ranked him #447 of the top 500 singles wrestlers in the PWI 500 in 2019
  - PWI ranked him #368 of the top 500 singles wrestlers in the PWI 500 in 2021
- Winner's Circle Pro Wrestling
  - WCPW Pound 4 Pound Championship (1 time)
- Santino Bros. Wrestling Academy
  - Santino Bros. Wrestling Championship (2 time)
  - Student of the Year (2010)
- SoCal Uncensored
  - 2021 Wrestler of the Year
  - Most Outstanding Wrestler (2012)
  - Tag Team of the Year (2013) - with Peter Avalon
