= Jordan Clearwater =

American professional wrestler (born 1997)

Personal information
- Born: Jordan Leonard; February 15, 1997 (age 29) Cincinnati, Ohio, United States

Professional wrestling career
- Ring name: Jordan Clearwater
- Billed height: 6 ft 2 in (188 cm)
- Billed weight: 220 lb (100 kg)
- Billed from: Cincinnati, Ohio; Dallas, Texas
- Trained by: Roger Ruffen; Karl Anderson
- Debut: February 13, 2016

Jordan Leonard (born February 15, 1997) is an American professional wrestler, and bodybuilder, known under his ring name, Jordan Clearwater. He performs on the independent circuit. He is best known for his time in the National Wrestling Alliance (NWA) where he is a former one-time NWA World Television Champion.

== Professional wrestling career ==
Clearwater was trained at Roger Ruffen's Northern Wrestling Federation. He would receive instruction and guidance from Ruffen, Karl Anderson, Abyss, and Chris Harris.

On the August 14, 2020 episode of NJPW Strong, Clearwater made his NJPW debut where he was paired with Clark Connors, losing to Barrett Brown and Logan Riegel. In September, Clearwater participated in the Lion's Break Crown where he lost to Connors in the first round. Clearwater would have his first win in New Japan on the February 5, 2021 episode of NJPW Strong in which he teamed up with Bateman, Misterioso, and Adrian Quest, defeating Brody King, Barrett Brown, Sterling Riegel and Logan Riegel in an eight-man tag team match.

Clearwater made his NWA debut on the December 22, 2020 episode of NWA Shockwave losing to Nick Aldis. He would make his next appearance on the March 23, 2021 episode of NWA Powerrr where he lost to Mike Parrow. On May 25, Clearwater participated in the battle royal to receive an NWA World Heavyweight Championship match at NWA When Our Shadows Fall; the match was won by Trevor Murdoch. On the July 13 episode of NWA PowerrrSurge, Clearwater defeated Rush Freeman and Papa Jive in a triple threat match, which was his first win in NWA. The following month, Clearwater would join Idolmania Sports Management, led by Austin Idol and at the NWA 73rd Anniversary Show, he teamed up with Tyrus and Cyon to defeat Da Pope and The End (Odinson and Parrow) in a six-man tag team match.

On November 12, 2022, at NWA Hard Times 3, Clearwater defeated AJ Cazana for the vacant NWA World Television title. He and Cazana previously competed on the October 22nd episode of NWA USA for the title, which ended in a time limit draw. On the February 14, 2023 episode of NWA Powerrr, Clearwater lost the title to Thom Latimer.

== Championships and accomplishments ==
- Northern Wrestling Federation
  - NWF Tag Team Championship (1 time) – with David Tyler
- Power Precision Pro Wrestling
  - 3PWA Heavyweight Championship (1 time, inaugural)
  - 3PWA Heavyweight Title Tournament (2019)
- National Wrestling Alliance
  - NWA World Television Championship (1 time)
- Empire Wrestling Federation
  - EWF American Championship (2 times)
  - Great Goliath Battle Royal (2019)
- United Wrestling Network
  - CWFH Heritage Heavyweight Championship (1 time)
  - UWN World Championship (1 time)
  - Red Carpet Rumble (2021)
- Pro Wrestling Illustrated
  - Ranked No. 258 of the top 500 singles wrestlers in the PWI 500 in 2023
