= Peter Avalon =

American professional wrestler

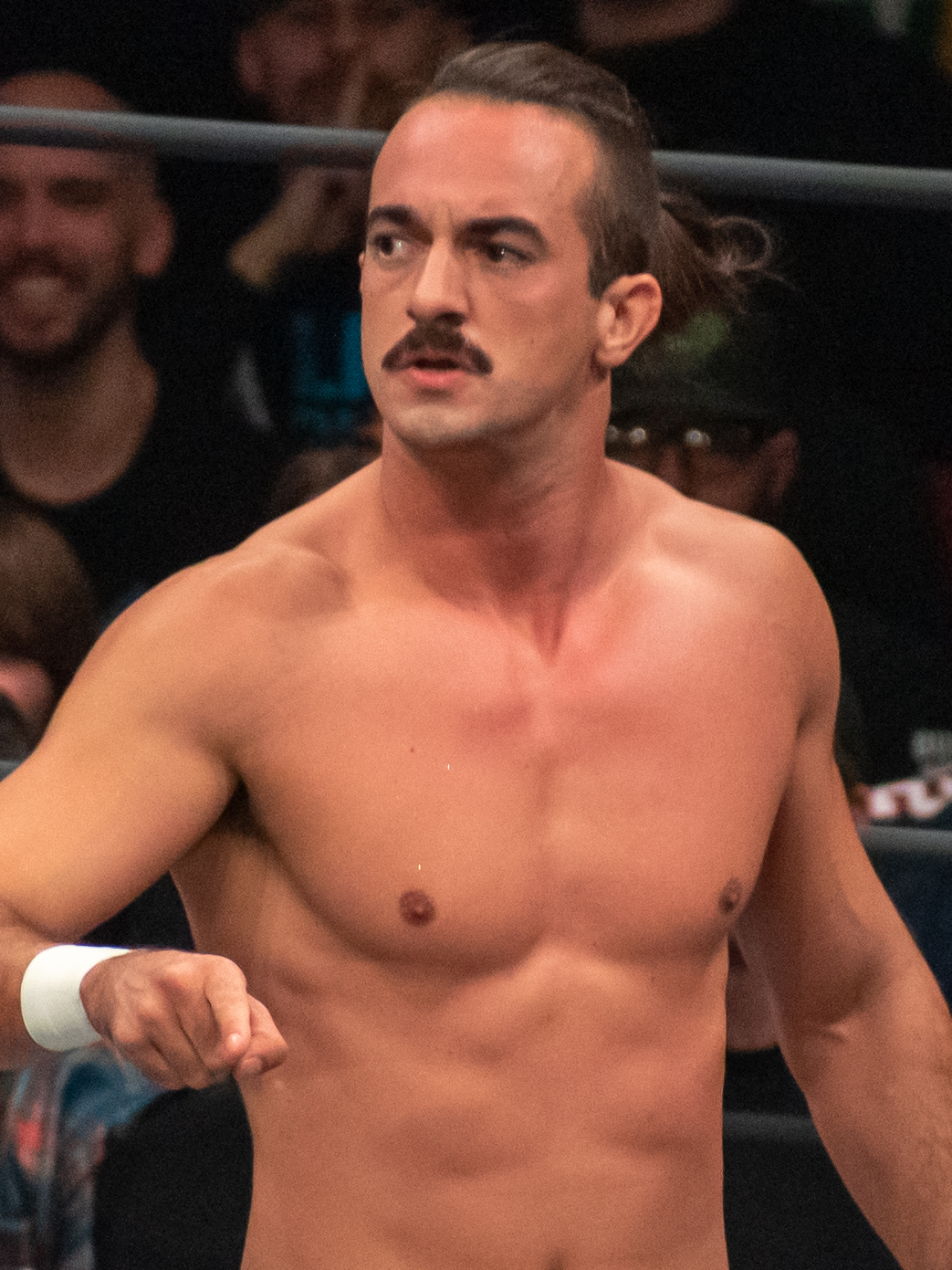
- Avalon in 2019

Personal information
- Born: Peter Hernandez; June 14, 1989 (age 37) Carson City, Nevada, U.S.
- Website: peteravalon.com

Professional wrestling career
- Ring name(s): Adam James; Norv Fernum "Pretty" Peter Avalon; Peter Avalon
- Billed height: 5 ft 10 in (1.78 m)
- Billed weight: 182 lb (83 kg)
- Billed from: Carson City, Nevada; San Diego, California
- Trained by: Charles Mercury; Jesse Hernandez; Johnny Paradise; Mr. Excitement; Ronin; Scorpio Sky
- Debut: November 15, 2008

Peter Hernandez (born June 14, 1989), better known by the ring name "Pretty" Peter Avalon, is an American professional wrestler signed to All Elite Wrestling (AEW). He is also known for his appearances in Championship Wrestling from Hollywood and Pro Wrestling Guerrilla. He has also appeared in Total Nonstop Action Wrestling as Norv Fernum.

== Professional wrestling career ==
=== Early career ===
Avalon debuted November 15, 2008, for the Empire Wrestling Federation against Chris Kadillak in San Bernardino, California in a losing effort. He would debut for the Alternative Wrestling Show early the following year. He would go on to win the Alternative Wrestling Show's Light-Heavyweight Title from T. J. Perkins on April 26, 2009, in Rowland Heights, California. Awarded the new AWS Lightweight Championship at the next show, he would go on to defend the championship amongst wrestlers in the Southern California area like Charles Mercury, Chris Kadillak, and Malachi Jackson. He would begin a feud with Human Tornado over the AWS championship which would culminate in a Falls Count Anywhere match on October 23, 2009, where he was the winner.

Avalon would continue to compete throughout Southern California in 2010 for companies like EWF, AWS, SoCal Pro Wrestling, Mach 1 Pro Wrestling, and New Wave Pro Wrestling. He would debut and compete in Portland, Oregon and surrounding areas for the West Coast Wrestling Connection. Avalon would go on to make his Pro Wrestling Guerrilla debut at "Seven" on July 30, 2010, in a 6-man tag match.

=== Championship Wrestling from Hollywood (2010–2014) ===
Avalon made his Championship Wrestling from Hollywood debut on August 25, 2010, in a losing effort to Colt Cabana. Peter would join up with Adam Pearce, Joey Kaos, and Austin Aries to form "The Standard". The four of them would go on to feud with the likes of Scorpio Sky, Joey Ryan, Nick Madrid, and Willie Mack throughout 2010 and early 2011.

In 2011, The Standard would eventually break-up and Peter would find himself aligned with Ray Rosas and Rico Dynamite. The trio would enter a feud with Ryan Taylor, Famous B, Aaron Bolo, and later, Jarek Matthews. The feud would culminate in a Six Man Tag Team Hair Vs. Hair Elimination Match on July 10, 2011, which saw Peter get his hair cut by Ryan Taylor. Avalon would eventually enter into a feud with Ryan Taylor. Peter, accompanied by Ray Rosas, would torment Taylor month after month, competing in several competitive and violent matches. The feud would culminate in a Steel Cage match on February 12, 2012, in Glendale, California with Peter on the losing end.

On July 21, 2013, Avalon and his partner Ray Rosas, now collectively known as "PPRay," defeated Los Bandidos (Rico Dynamite & Tito Escondido), The RockNES Monsters (Johnny Goodtime & Johnny Yuma) and The Tribe (Hawaiian Lion & Navajo Warrior) in an Elimination tag team match to win the CWFH Heritage Tag Team Championships.

Avalon would go on to relinquish the tag team championships after Rosas sustained an injury, but was interrupted by the RockNES Monsters. Instead of giving the titles up, Peter chose to defend the titles in a 2 on 1 handicap match against RockNES. Peter would ultimately lose the match and the Heritage Tag Team Titles to the RockNES Monsters on April 13, 2014. On October 12, 2014, for CWFHollywood, PPRay defeated The RockNES Monsters to win the CWFH Heritage Tag Team Championship. They lost the titles against the former champions 12 days later at a Baja Stars event in Tijuana, Mexico.

=== Total Nonstop Action Wrestling (2013–2015) ===
Hernandez made his TNA debut on October 20, 2013, at Bound for Glory as a jobber, losing to Ethan Carter III using the ring name Norv Fernum. Following his appearance at Bound for Glory, Fernum returned on the October 31, episode of Impact Wrestling challenging and losing to Carter in a rematch. On the November 28, 2013, Thanksgiving edition of Impact Wrestling, The BroMans (Robbie E and Jessie Godderz) defeated Dewey Barnes and Fernum to win the first ever tag team turkey bowl, in the process forcing Barnes and Fernum to wear the annual turkey suits. On the December 12, 2013, episode of Impact Wrestling Fernum competed in a twelve-man Feast or Fired match. On January 2, 2014, Fernum was defeated by the debuting Samuel Shaw.

On the July 9, 2015, episode of Impact Wrestling, Fernum made his return to TNA, unsuccessfully challenging TNA World Heavyweight Champion Ethan Carter III in a Gauntlet match for the championship.

=== Championship Wrestling from Arizona (2016–present) ===
In 2016, the United Wrestling Network created a sister program to CWFH, called Championship Wrestling from Arizona.

In addition to continuing as an in-ring performer, Avalon took on a production role behind the scenes. His backstage role ultimately bled on-screen as he began to refer to himself as "Producer" Peter Avalon.

Frequently abusing his power, Avalon received a lawsuit from attorney Celino Barnes for his client Ryan Morals. Avalon eventually lost control of the show to Ryan Morals in a Gavel-On-a-Pole Match, which was the brainchild of Barnes. Avalon ultimately won control of the show back shortly before re-debuting on CWFH programming.

=== WWE (2017) ===
On December 5, 2017, Hernandez appeared on SmackDown Live as a jobber, under the name Adam James, teaming with Fidel Bravo (under the name Josh Carr) in a losing effort against the Bludgeon Brothers.

=== All Elite Wrestling (2019–present) ===
On the April 22, 2019, episode of Being The Elite, it was announced that Avalon had signed with All Elite Wrestling (AEW). At Fyter Fest, he made his AEW debut as a heel accompanying fellow librarian Leva Bates in her match and at Fight for the Fallen, he made his AEW in-ring debut, losing to Sonny Kiss.

Avalon went on a losing streak between October 2019 and November 2020 on AEW Dark, both in single and tag team matches. On the May 26, 2020, edition of AEW Dark, Avalon began a storyline with Brandon Cutler in a "race to the bottom", trying to get their first wins in AEW. The next week, Avalon and Cutler would compete in tag team action, losing to teams such as The Natural Nightmares (Dustin Rhodes and Q. T. Marshall), Jurassic Express (Marko Stunt and Luchasaurus), SoCal Uncensored (Christopher Daniels and Frankie Kazarian), and The Young Bucks. They were a dysfunctional tag team until they shook hands with each other as a sign of respect after losing to The Young Bucks, turning Avalon face in the process. They made a team called 'The Initiative'. However, The Initiative lost all of their matches and couldn't win a single match, leading Peter to attack Brandon Cutler. Shortly after, they resumed their feud against each other with both men fighting to achieve their first victory in AEW. On the September 15, 2020, edition of AEW Dark, Avalon and Cutler had their first match against each other which ended in a double count out, leaving both men still winless. Avalon would face Cutler again on the October 13, 2020, episode of Dark and this time the match ended in a double disqualification, again leaving both competitors without a single victory. On the October 19, 2020, episode of Being the Elite (where much of Avalon and Cutler's feud has played out) AEW President Tony Khan announced Avalon vs. Cutler III for the October 27, 2020, edition of Dark and stipulated that there must be a winner. On the October 27, 2020, episode of Dark, Avalon lost the match to end the feud.

Following this, Avalon began a new gimmick without Leva Bates as 'Pretty' Peter Avalon in a vignette on AEW Dark. On the November 24, 2020, episode of Dark, after 27 losses and two draws, Avalon would finally win his first match in AEW after pinning Fuego Del Sol. He then embarked a five match winning streak. His five match winning streak came to an end when he lost to Cody Rhodes in the January 20, 2021, edition of AEW Dynamite. On the January 26, 2021, episode of Dark, Avalon would align himself with Cezar Bononi. He had his first win in AEW on the February 9 episode of Dark, teaming with Avalon to defeat Carlie Bravo and Shawn Dean. Bononi made his first in-ring appearance on the February 4 episode of Dynamite, teaming with Avalon in a loss to the team of Lee Johnson and Cody Rhodes. At Revolution, Bononi and Avalon took part in the Tag Team Casino Battle Royale in a losing effort. Avalon later aligned with Ryan Nemeth and JD Drake and together, they formed a faction known as The Wingmen.

== Championships and accomplishments ==
- Alternative Wrestling Show
  - AWS Light Heavyweight Championship (1 time)
  - AWS Tag Team Championship (3 times) – with Ray Rosas
  - Race for the Ring Tag Team Tournament (2015) – with Ray Rosas.
- Adrenaline Unleashed Pro Wrestling
  - AUPW Las Vegas Championship (1 time)
- Championship Wrestling From Hollywood
  - CWFH Heritage Heavyweight Championship (1 time)
  - CWFH Heritage Tag Team Championship (3 times) – with Ray Rosas
  - UWN Television Championship (1 time)
  - Red Carpet Rumble (2015)
- DDT Pro-Wrestling
  - Ironman Heavymetalweight Championship (1 time)
- FIST Combat
  - FIST Heavyweight Championship (1 time)
- Insane Wrestling League
  - IWL World Heavyweight Championship (1 time, final)
  - IWL Anarchy Championship (1 time)
- SoCal Pro Wrestling
  - SCP Tag Team Championship (1 time) – with Nick Lovin
- Pro Wrestling Illustrated
  - PWI ranked him #328 of the top 500 singles wrestlers in the PWI 500 in 2012
- SoCal Uncensored
  - Tag Team of the Year (2013) – with Ray Rosas
- West Coast Wrestling Connection
  - WCWC Tag Team Championship (1 time) – with El Tucson

== Work outside of wrestling ==
Avalon had a part in Len Kabasinski's 2022 action film, Pact of Vengeance which also starred Leo Fong and Jon Mikl Thor.
