= UWN Television Championship =

Professional wrestling championship

Details
- Promotion: Championship Wrestling (United Wrestling Network)
- Current champion: Evan Daniels
- Date won: April 29, 2025 (aired June 1, 2025)

Other names
- NWA International Television Championship; CWFH International Television Championship; MAV Television Championship
Statistics
- First champion: Scorpio Sky
- Most reigns: Scorpio Sky (5 times)
- Longest reign: Zicky Dice (429 days)
- Shortest reign: Peter Avalon (28 days)
- Oldest champion: Evan Daniels (36 years)
- Youngest champion: Willie Mack (26 years)
- Heaviest champion: Papo Esco (301 lbs)
- Lightest champion: Rocky Romero (173 lbs)

The United Wrestling Network (UWN) Television Championship is a title controlled by, and defended in Championship Wrestling (formally known as Championship Wrestling from Hollywood, or CWFH), sanctioned by the United Wrestling Network.

== Title history ==
On July 10, 2011, Scorpio Sky pinned So Cal Crazy after hitting the "Ace of Spades" to win the "Be the Star" Television Title Tournament to be crowned the first NWA International Television Champion.

After the promotion parted ways with the National Wrestling Alliance (NWA), the Championship was renamed the CWFH International Television Championship.

In 2013, the title was again renamed the MAV Television Championship. During 2015, the title was renamed to United Wrestling Network Television Championship.

=== Names ===
| Name | Years |
|---|---|
| NWA International Television Championship | July 10, 2011 – September 9, 2012 |
| CWFH International Television Championship | September 9, 2012 – 2013 |
| MAV Television Championship | 2013 – 2015 |
| UWN Television Championship | September 13, 2015 – present |

=== Reigns ===
Key
| No. | Overall reign number |
| Reign | Reign number for the specific champion |
| Days | Number of days held |
| N/A | Unknown information |
| † | Championship change is unrecognized by the promotion |
| <1 | Reign lasted less than a day |

| No. | Champion | Championship change | | | Reign statistics | | Notes | Ref. |
| No. | Champion | Date | Event | Location | Reign | Days | Notes | Ref. |
|---|---|---|---|---|---|---|---|---|
National Wrestling Alliance (NWA)
| 1 | Scorpio Sky | July 10, 2011 | NWA Championship Wrestling From Hollywood episode 48 | Los Angeles, CA | 1 | 378 | Sky defeated So Cal Crazy in a tournament final to become the inaugural champion. | |
| 2 | Willie Mack | July 22, 2012 | NWA Championship Wrestling From Hollywood episode 92 | Glendale, CA | 1 | 238 | | |
| 3 | Tyler Cintron | March 17, 2013 | Championship Wrestling From Hollywood season 3 episode 22 | Glendale, CA | 1 | 126 | This was a street fight. | |
Championship Wrestling from Hollywood (CWFH)
| 4 | Joey Ryan | July 21, 2013 | Championship Wrestling From Hollywood season 3 episode 31 | Commerce, CA | 1 | 294 | This was a best two out of three falls match. In November 2013, the championship was renamed the MAV Television Championship. | |
| 5 | Ryan Taylor | May 11, 2014 | Championship Wrestling From Hollywood | Port Hueneme, CA | 1 | 35 | | |
| 6 | Joey Ryan | June 15, 2014 | CWFH Red Carpet Rumble 2014 | Port Hueneme, CA | 2 | 70 | | |
| 7 | Ryan Taylor | August 24, 2014 | Unknown | Port Hueneme, CA | 2 | 154 | | |
| 8 | Scorpio Sky | January 25, 2015 | Unknown | Port Hueneme, CA | 2 | 56 | | |
| 9 | Kevin Martenson | March 22, 2015 | Unknown | Port Hueneme, CA | 1 | 126 | | |
| 10 | Peter Avalon | July 26, 2015 | Unknown | Port Hueneme, CA | 1 | 28 | | |
| — | Vacated | August 23, 2015 | — | — | — | — | Peter Avalon vacated the championship after winning the Hollywood Heritage Championship. | |
United Wrestling Network (UWN) / Championship Wrestling from Hollywood (CWFH)
| 11 | James Morgan | September 13, 2015 | Unknown | Port Hueneme, CA | 1 | 245 | The vacated championship was awarded to Morgan for winning the 2015 Summer Classic. | |
| 12 | Tyler Bateman | May 15, 2016 | CWFH TV Taping | Port Hueneme, CA | 1 | 273 | | |
| 13 | Scorpio Sky | February 12, 2017 | Unknown | Port Hueneme, CA | 3 | 105 | | |
| 14 | Rocky Romero | May 28, 2017 | CWFH TV Taping | Port Hueneme, CA | 1 | 189 | | |
| 15 | Scorpio Sky | December 3, 2017 | CWFH Milestone | Port Hueneme, CA | 4 | 189 | | |
| 16 | Ray Rosas | June 10, 2018 | CWFH Coastline Clash | Port Hueneme, CA | 1 | 91 | | |
| 17 | Oliver Grimsley | September 9, 2018 | Championship Wrestling from Arizona | Mesa, AZ | 1 | 20 | | |
| 18 | Royce Isaacs | September 29, 2018 | CWFH TV Tapings | Port Hueneme, CA | 1 | 226 | | |
| 19 | Tyler Bateman | May 13, 2019 | CWFH Coastline Clash | Irvine, CA | 2 | (Note: The exact length of Bateman's second reign is unknown. It could have lasted between 19 and 48 days.) | | |
| 20 | Scorpio Sky | June 2019 | N/A | Port Hueneme, CA | 5 | (Note: The exact length of Scorpio Sky's fifth reign is unknown. It could have lasted between 18 and 48 days.) | | |
| 21 | Royce Isaacs | August 18, 2019 | CWFH Episode 434 | Port Hueneme, CA | 2 | 287 | This was a three-way match, also involving Tyler Bateman. | |
| 22 | Dan Joseph | February 8, 2020 | CWFH TV Tapings | Port Hueneme, CA | 1 | 252 | | |
| 23 | Levi Shapiro | October 17, 2020 | N/A | Port Hueneme, CA | 1 | 399 | | |
| 23 | Papo Esco | November 20, 2021 | Red Carpet Rumble | Commerce, CA | 1 | 262 | This was a street fight. | |
| 24 | Jordan Cruz | August 9, 2022 | Golden Opportunity | Irvine, CA | 1 | 182 | Aired on tape delay on August 28. | |
| 25 | Jack Banning | February 7, 2023 | Championship Wrestling presented by CarShield | Irvine, CA | 1 | 383 | Aired on tape delay on February 19. | |
| 26 | Zicky Dice | February 25, 2024 | Championship Wrestling presented by CarShield | Long Beach, CA | 1 | 429 | Aired on tape delay on March 17. | |
| 27 | Evan Daniels | April 29, 2025 | Championship Wrestling Coastline Clash | Irvine, CA | 1 | 206+ | Aired on tape delay on June 1. | |

== Combined reigns ==
As of November 21, 2025.

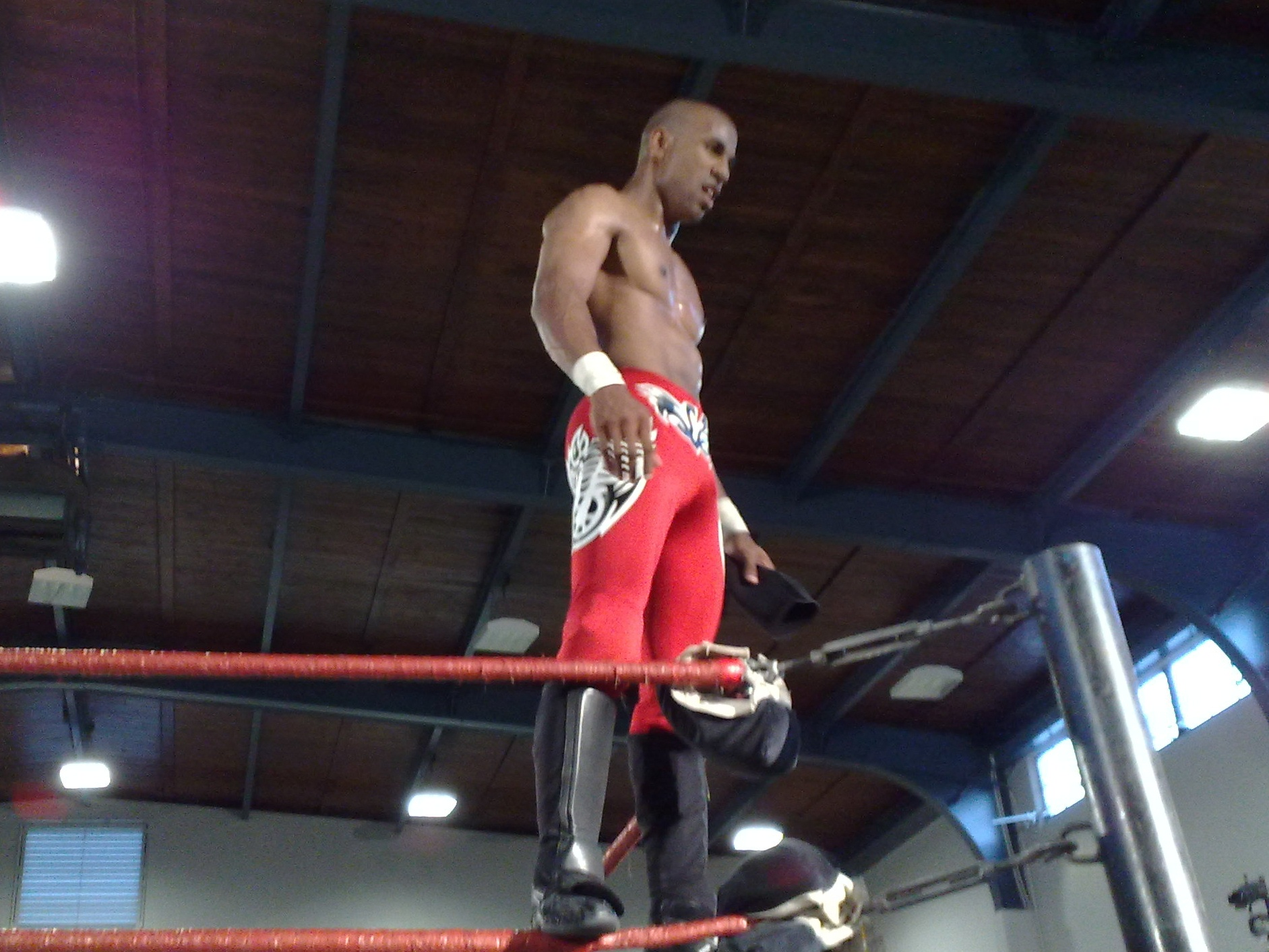
Scorpio Sky, record five-time with longest combined reigns.

| Rank | Wrestler | No. of reigns | Combined days |
|---|---|---|---|
| 1 | Scorpio Sky | 5 | 746¤ |
| 2 | Royce Isaacs | 2 | 516 |
| 3 | Zicky Dice | 1 | 429 |
| 4 | Levi Shapiro | 1 | 399 |
| 5 | Jack Banning | 1 | 383 |
| 6 | Joey Ryan | 2 | 364 |
| 7 | Tyler Bateman | 2 | 292¤ |
| 8 | Papo Esco | 1 | 262 |
| 9 | James Morgan | 1 | 245 |
| 10 | Willie Mack | 1 | 238 |
| 11 | Evan Daniels † | 1 | 206+ |
| 12 | Rocky Romero | 1 | 189 |
| 12 | Ryan Taylor | 2 | 189 |
| 14 | Jordan Cruz | 1 | 182 |
| 15 | Dan Joseph | 1 | 139 |
| 16 | Kevin Martenson | 1 | 126 |
| 16 | Tyler Cintron | 1 | 126 |
| 18 | Ray Rosas | 1 | 91 |
| 19 | Peter Avalon | 1 | 28 |
| 20 | Oliver Grimsley | 1 | 20 |

== See also ==
- CWFH Heritage Heavyweight Championship
- AEW TNT Championship
