= Championship Wrestling from Hollywood =

American professional wrestling television program

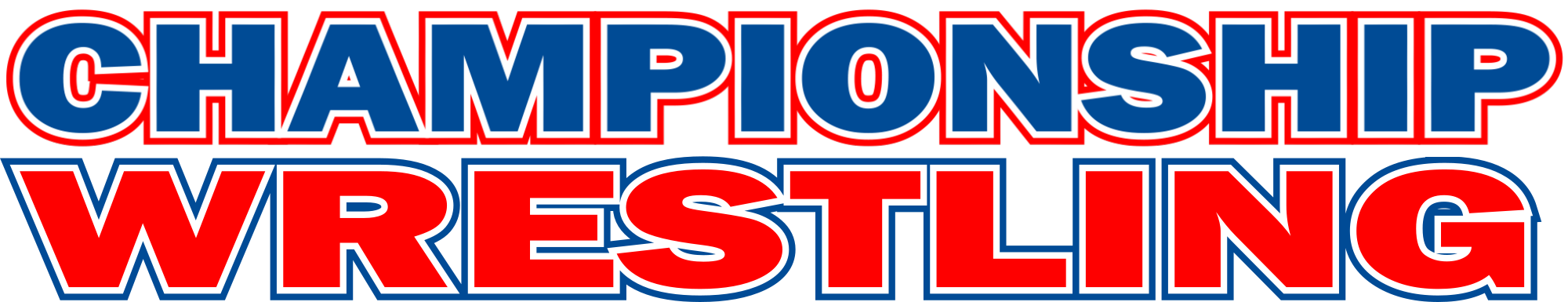
- Also known as: NWA Championship Wrestling from Hollywood; Championship Wrestling; UWN Championship Wrestling
- Genre: Professional wrestling
- Created by: David Marquez
- Presented by: Todd Keneley
- Starring: Championship Wrestling roster
- Country of origin: United States
- Original language: English
- No. of seasons: Original series:12 2022 series: 2
- No. of episodes: Original series: 537; 2022 series: 107

Production
- Executive producer: David Marquez
- Camera setup: Multicamera setup
- Running time: 60 minutes
- Production companies: David Marquez Productions; Championship Television

Original release
- Network: First-run syndication YouTube
- Release: September 17, 2010 – present

UWN Championship Wrestling (formally known as Championship Wrestling from Hollywood (CWFH) and Championship Wrestling) is an American professional wrestling promotion and television program created by David Marquez, who serves as the promotion's president and on-camera interviewer. The television series originally premiered on September 17, 2010, and aires on KDOC-TV Los Angeles as well as first-run syndication in the United States and YouTube worldwide.

Championship Wrestling is the flagship of the United Wrestling Network (UWN). Until 2012, both the promotion and show were known as NWA Championship Wrestling from Hollywood (NWA Hollywood), and was a member of the National Wrestling Alliance (NWA). In 2022, CWFH was merged with Championship Wrestling from Arizona and Championship Wrestling from Atlanta under the Championship Wrestling presented by CarShield banner. The new series premiered on the weekend of April 24, 2022.

== History ==
=== Early years ===
NWA Hollywood was originally produced with Big Vision Entertainment and taped at Columbia Square Studios in Hollywood. After launching on KDOC-TV, the Galaxy Theater in Santa Ana became the promotion's home venue. On 12 May 2012, NWA Hollywood ran its first non-TV event in its history, with Scorpio Sky vs. Nick Madrid as it main event.

NWA Hollywood was originally booked by Adam Pearce; he was replaced by Joey Ryan in January 2011. On August 4, 2011, Ryan was relieved of his duties.

On September 9, 2012, David Marquez announced that the promotion had left the NWA.

=== Post-NWA ===
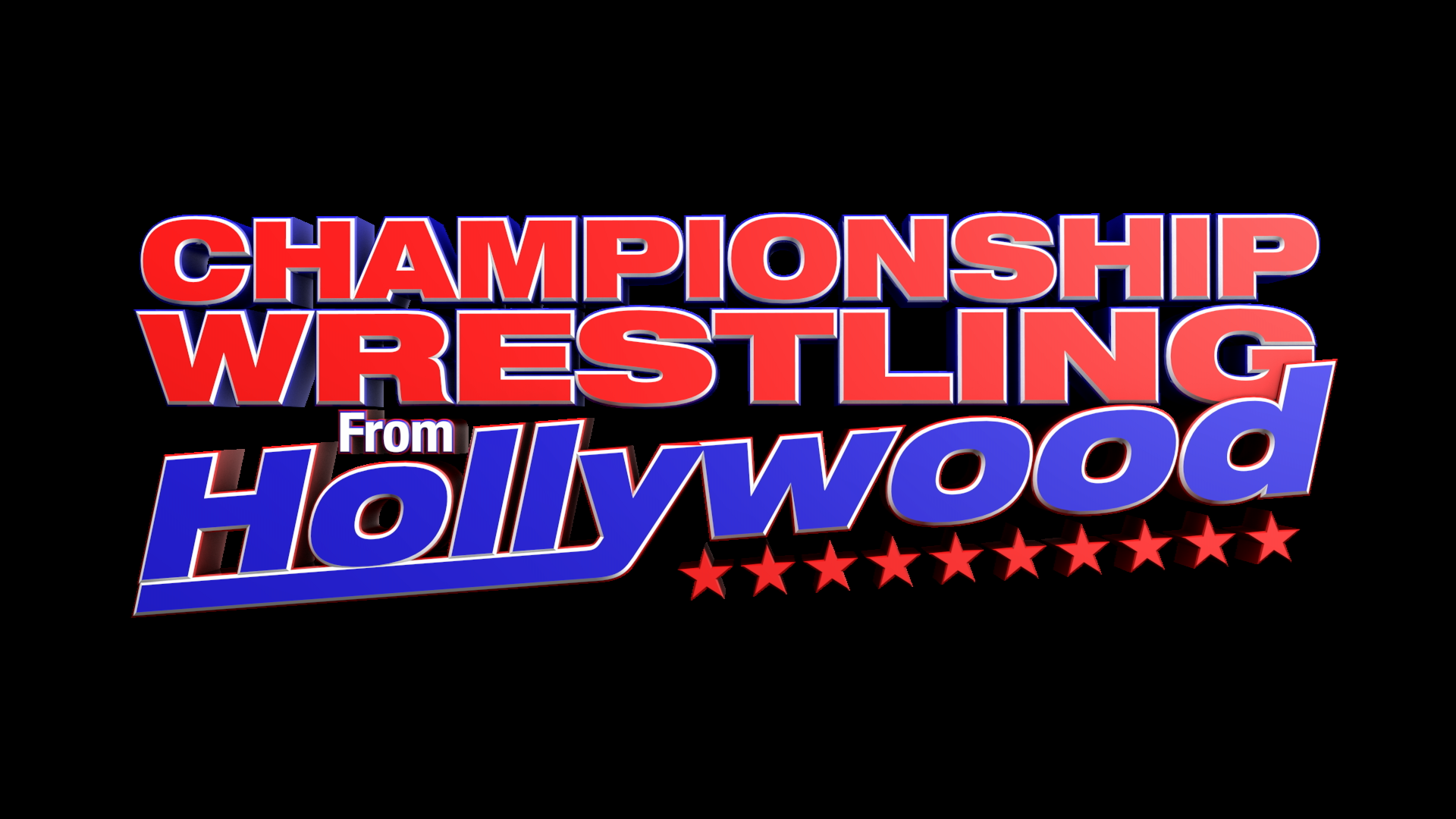
Wordmark logo from 2014 to 2022

On August 13, 2013, CWFH moved to the Oceanview Pavilion in Port Hueneme, California, with tapings held on the second and fourth Sunday of each month. That same day, Matt Striker joined the announce team, and The Grappler made his initial on-camera debut as a manager. On October 22, 2013, CWFH and nine other wrestling promotions created a new governing body known as the United Wrestling Network (UWN).

In 2017, CWFH would briefly re-establish a partnership with the NWA, now under the ownership of Billy Corgan of the Smashing Pumpkins, wherein Nick Aldis feuded with Tim Storm for the NWA World Heavyweight Championship.

In September 2020, Aron Haddad was made the promotion's booker. On October 3, 2020, Marquez stepped down as executive producer, naming Nick Bonnano as the new EP.

=== Merger and relaunch ===
Due to the Omicron variant of COVID-19 causing the cancellation of several UWN television tapings, CWFH would briefly go on hiatus after its September 11, 2021 episode. The show would return with its October 23 episode as it, along with the other Championship Wrestling programs, would later feature footage from the November 20th UWN Primetime Live event, and "best of" clip shows.

On February 17, 2022, the United Wrestling Network announced in a press release that they will be merging CWFH with Championship Wrestling from Arizona and Championship Wrestling from Atlanta into a singular entity under the Championship Wrestling presented by CarShield branding. The first taping for the new show took place at the Irvine Improv in Irvine, California on March 22. The new show would premiere on the weekend of April 24, 2022.

== Championships ==
=== Current champions ===
| Championship | Current Champion(s) | Previous | Date Won | Days | Location |
|---|---|---|---|---|---|
| UWN World Championship | Jordan Cruz | Danny Limelight | July 1, 2025 | 687+ | Irvine, California |
| UWN Women's World Championship | Big Mama | Inaugural | February 25, 2025 | 632+ | Irvine, California |
| UWN Heritage Heavyweight Championship | Maximilien | EJ Sparks | November 18, 2025 | 366+ | Oxnard, California |
| UWN Television Championship | Evan Daniels | Zicky Dice | April 29, 2025 | 569+ | Irvine, California |
| UWN Tag Team Championship | 5150 (Danny Limelight and Slice Boogie) | TMDK Aka The Wolf Zaddies (Shane Haste, Bad Dude Tito and Che Cabrera) | September 23, 2025 | 422+ | Oxnard, California |

=== Defunct championships ===
| Championship | Last champion(s) | Reign | Date won | Days held | Location | Notes |
|---|---|---|---|---|---|---|
| CWFH Heritage Tag Team Championship | Drew Gulak and Timothy Thatcher | 1 | June 29, 2015 | 160 | Port Hueneme, California | Deactivated when Gulak and Thatcher were awarded the UWN Tag Team Championship. |

=== Other accomplishments ===
| Accomplishment | Latest winner | Date won |
|---|---|---|
| Red Carpet Rumble | Invictus Khash | January 14, 2023 |
| Percy Pringle III Memorial Cup | Ray Rosas | March 23, 2020 |

== Roster ==
The Championship Wrestling roster consists mainly of independent freelancers. They take part in scripted feuds and storylines. Wrestlers are portrayed as either villains or heroes in the scripted events that build tension and culminate in a wrestling match. Active wrestlers and on-screen talent appear on Championship Wrestling presented by CarShield, and at live events.

Personnel is organized below by their role in Championship Wrestling. Their ring name is on the left, and their real name is on the right.

Male wrestlers

| Ring name | Real name | Stable | Notes |
|---|---|---|---|
| Action Braxton | Braxton J. George | FAME | |
| Adrian Quest | Adrian Uribe | | |
| Adriel Noctis | Tyler Webb | Wasted Youth | |
| Andy Brown | Andrew Minafee | | |
| Anthony Idol | Unknown | The Price Check Ranch | |
| Antonio Rivers | Antonio Rios | The Pumpline | |
| Boa Silva | Brandon Silva | The Pumpline | |
| Clark Connors | Connor Deutsch | | Signed to New Japan Pro-Wrestling |
| Dan Joseph | Dan Siejak | | |
| Danny Limelight | Daniel Rivera | The Bodega | UWN Tag Team Champion |
| Darwin Finch | James Thomas | The Friendship Farm | |
| Devin Sparks | Unknown | The Hogsmen | |
| Dom Kubrick | Unknown | | |
| Eddie Pearl | Eddie Pearl | The Midnight Heat | |
| EJ Sparks | Erik Johnson | | |
| FrescoMatic | Unknown | FAME | |
| McCallion | David McCallion | Delirium | |
| Gentleman Jervis | Kevin Condron | The Friendship Farm | |
| Honest John | Unknown | The Price Check Ranch | |
| Jack Banning | Unknown | | |
| Jack Cartwright | Jack Cartwright | | |
| Jesse James | Unknown | | |
| Jody Sutton | Unknown | | |
| Jordan Clearwater | Unknown | | |
| Jordan Cruz | Parker Lopez | | CWFH Heritage Heavyweight Champion |
| Keita | Keita Murray | | |
| Kevin Martenson | Kevin Martenson | | |
| Levi Shapiro | Nick Robinson | The Price Check Ranch | UWN Television Champion |
| MAXIMILIEN | Unknown | | Managed by Jordan Castle |
| Miguel | Unknown | | |
| Mike Camden | Unknown | The Hogsmen | |
| Papo Esco | Raul Barron | The Bodega | UWN Tag Team Champion |
| Pirancanrana | Unknown | | |
| Ray Rosas | Ray Rosas | | CWFA Arizona State Champion |
| Slade | Richard Torkan | Delirium | |
| Ricky Gibson | Unknown | The Midnight Heat | |
| Robert Baines | Brandon Taylor | | |
| Robin Shaw | Matthew Shaw | | |
| Sketch | Evan Goodfield | Wasted Youth | |
| Slice Boogie | Milton Troche | The Bodega | |
| Snypes | Unknown | | |
| Watson | Unknown | FAME | |
| Watts | Eric Watts | | |
| Will Allday | William Allday | | |

Female wrestlers

| Ring name | Real name | Stable | Notes |
|---|---|---|---|
| Cece Chanel | Unknown | | |
| Heather Monroe | Heather Horstmann | | |
| Mylo Matters | Jenna Charneco | | |
| Ruby Raze | Gina Hernandez | | |
| Sandra Moone | Unknown | | |
| Viva Van | Victorya Tran | The Boddy Shop | |
| Vipress | Unknown | | |

Other on-air talent

| Ring name | Real name | Notes |
|---|---|---|
| Guy Tweakacetti | Unknown | Manager of The Midnight Heat |
| Howdy Price | Bobby Ramos | Manager of The Price Check Ranch |
| Jamie Iovine | James Iovine | Acting Matchmaker of CWFH |
| Halston Boddy | Bob Koenig | Manager of The Boddy Shop |

Broadcast team

| Ring name | Real name | Notes |
|---|---|---|
| Todd Keneley | Todd Keneley | Lead Commentator |
| James “Bimbo Jimbo” Kincaid | James Kincaid | Commentator |
| Blake "Bulletproof" Troop | Blake Troop | Combat Sports Analyst & Color Commentator |
| Jack Farmer | Jack Farmer | Interviewer |
| Jon Roberts | Jon Roberts | Interviewer |
| Adnan Kureishy | Adnan Kureishy | Ring Announcer |

Referees

| Name | Notes |
|---|---|
| Nick Bonanno | Senior Official |
| Allison Leah | Official |
| Andrew Edmondston | Official |
| Chad Rico | Official |
| Scott Johnson | Official |

Backstage personnel

| Ring name | Real name | Notes |
|---|---|---|
| Dave Marquez | David Marquez | Executive Producer |
| Nikko Marquez | Nickolas Marquez | Matchmaker / Manager for The Office |
| Noel Marquez | Noel Marquez | Spanish Announcer |
| Miguel Martinez | Mike Reign | Spanish Announcer |

== See also ==
- United Wrestling Network
  - UWN Primetime Live
- List of National Wrestling Alliance territories
- List of independent wrestling promotions in the United States
