= Chris Dickinson =

American professional wrestler (born 1987)

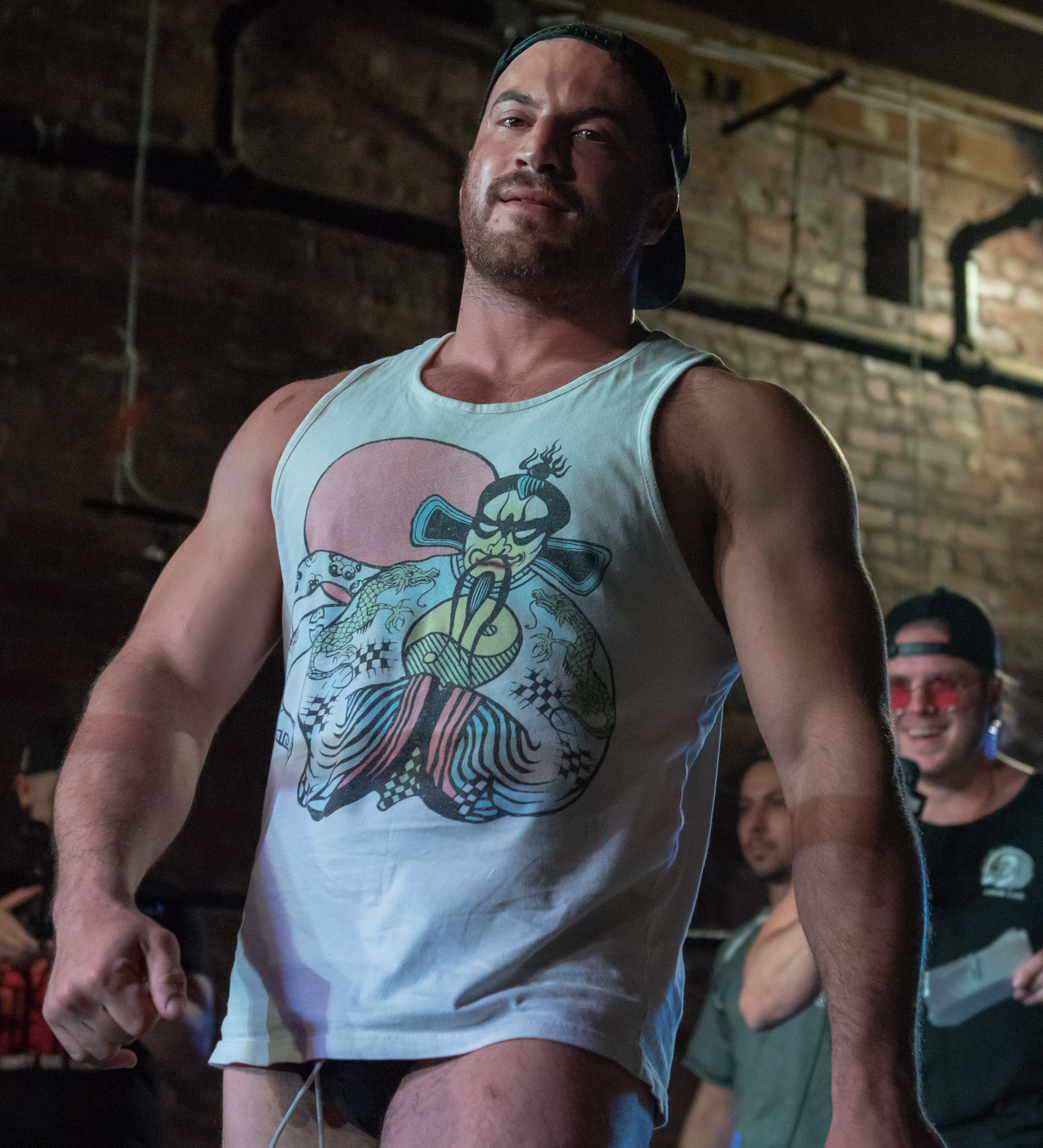
- Dickinson in June 2019

Personal information
- Born: Christopher Torre; August 11, 1987 (age 39) Staten Island, New York, U.S.

Professional wrestling career
- Ring name(s): Chris Dickinson; Paco Loco
- Billed height: 5 ft 10 in (178 cm)
- Billed weight: 235 lb (107 kg)
- Billed from: Killah Hills 10304
- Trained by: Magic; Jersey All Pro Wrestling
- Debut: 2002

Christopher Torre (born August 11, 1987), better known by his ring name Chris Dickinson, is an American professional wrestler.

He is best known for his work in Game Changer Wrestling, Ring of Honor, Evolve Wrestling, Jersey All Pro Wrestling, New Japan Pro Wrestling and Beyond Wrestling. He has also worked for various promotions around the world, including Lucha Libre AAA Worldwide in Mexico, Pro Wrestling Zero1 in Japan, Preston City Wrestling in England, International Wrestling Syndicate in Canada, and American promotions Combat Zone Wrestling and Chikara.

== Professional wrestling career ==
=== Early career (2002–2003) ===
Initially a backyard wrestler, training in late 2001, Torre started his wrestling career in 2002 when he was 15, wrestling around the New Jersey area under the name Paco Loco.

=== Independent circuit (2008–present) ===
After a hiatus from professional wrestling, Torre, now billed as Chris Dickinson made his wrestling in ring return in 2008 for Jersey All Pro Wrestling where he was defeated Earl Cooter and Amy Lee. In 2009, Dickinson made his debut for Beyond Wrestling after being told about it by fellow Jersey All Pro trainee and friend, Corvis Fear. At Beyond's debut show, Dickinson was defeated by Eric Alverado in the first ever match held by Beyond Wrestling. In Dickinson's fourth match for Beyond he wrestled against future Doom Patrol partner Jaka (then known as Jonny Mangue).

In 2015, Dickinson made his debut for Ring of Honor where he lost to Michael Elgin.

Dickinson made his debut for Mexican promotion Lucha Libre AAA Worldwide for AAA's Lucha Invades NY event in which Dickinson teamed with Mini-Estrella Mascarita Dorada against Dave The Clown and Mini-Estrella Demus. Later in the year, Dickinson wrestled for a AAA and Promociones EMW joint-event teaming with Black Boy and Tiago.

=== Evolve Wrestling (2010, 2015–2018) ===
Dickinson made his Evolve Wrestling debut at Evolve 1 in 2010 where he was defeated by Johnny Gargano. Dickinson returned to Evolve in 2015 at Evolve 49 where he was scheduled to face Willie Mack but due to travel issues the match was changed to Dickinson vs Tracy Williams where Dickinson picked up the victory via submission. After the match, Dickinson was chased down by Matt Riddle. The following night at Evolve 50, Dickinson was defeated by Matt Riddle.

=== Jersey Championship Wrestling / Game Changer Wrestling (2014–2016, 2018–present) ===
In 2014, Dickinson made his Game Changer Wrestling (then Jersey Championship Wrestling) debut as part of the tag team Jersey J-Cup. After the rebranding of Jersey Championship Wrestling, Dickinson wrestled on the second event held under the Game Changer Wrestling name in late 2015 being defeated by Joey Janela.

Dickinson made his pro-wrestling debut in Japan with GCW in February 2020 at Shin-Kiba 1st Ring against Yuji Okabayashi. The following night at GCW Ready to Die, Dickinson teamed with KTB against Okabayashi and Shigehiro Irie.

=== WWE (2018) ===
As part of WWE and Evolve Wrestling's partnership, Dickinson and Jaka made their WWE debut at WrestleMania 34 Axxess where they successfully defended their Evolve tag team championships against Oney Lorcan and Danny Burch.

=== Japan (2020) ===
While in Japan with GCW, Dickinson teamed with Tida Heat at a Dove Pro Wrestling event on February 8, 2020, where they were defeated by Toru and Gaina. The following day, Dickinson teamed up with Matthew Justice to defeat Yoshikazu Yokoyama and Chris Vice of the Voodoo Murders in a hardcore match at a Pro Wrestling Zero1 show. On February 10, Dickinson and Justice made their Korakuen Hall debut for Pro Wrestling Freedoms where the duo unsuccessfully challenged Violento Jack and Mammoth Sasaki for the King of Freedom World Tag Team Championships.

=== New Japan Pro-Wrestling (2021–2022) ===
In January 2021, Dickinson made his New Japan Pro-Wrestling debut as part of the NJPW Strong show. He joined Tom Lawlor's Team Filthy replacing Rust Taylor who had signed to WWE.

== Personal life ==
Torre became a fan of professional wrestling at a young age, looking up to WWF wrestlers such as Hulk Hogan, Ultimate Warrior, Roddy Piper and others. As a young teenager, Torre became a big fan of Extreme Championship Wrestling's Sabu and Rob Van Dam, as well as falling in love with All Japan Pro Wrestling and tag teams such as The Road Warriors and The British Bulldogs, in which he also credits as an influence on his in ring style. Dickinson trains in catch wrestling and grappling under Josh Barnett.

=== Abuse allegations ===
In April 2022, independent wrestler Christina Von Eerie, who was once in a relationship with Torre, took to social media and claims that he would often degrade her and her in-ring work when they were dating. She added that it became physical and he would push her, hold her down and block her from the doorway. After another woman came forward with similar allegations, he pulled out from GCW's "In Too Deep" event.

== Championships and accomplishments ==
- Absolute Intense Wrestling
  - AIW Intense Championship (1 time)
- Allied Independent Wrestling Federations
  - AIWF World Tag Team Championship (2 times) – with Corey Duncom
- Beyond Wrestling
  - One Night Tournament winner (2009)
- Evolve Wrestling
  - Evolve Tag Team Championship (2 times) – with Jaka
- Inter Species Wrestling
  - Inter Species Championship (1 time)
  - ISW Undisputed King Of Crazy Championship (1 time)
- International Wrestling Syndicate
  - IWS Canadian Championship (1 time)
- Jersey All Pro Wrestling
  - JAPW Tag Team Championship (1 time) – with Sami Callihan
- Jersey Championship Wrestling / Game Changer Wrestling
  - The Acid Cup 2 (2020)
  - Jersey J-Cup winner (2014)
- Pro Wrestling Illustrated
  - Ranked No. 92 of the top 500 singles wrestlers in the PWI 500 in 2021
- Ring of Honor
  - ROH World Tag Team Championship (1 time) – with Homicide
- United Wrestling Network
  - UWN World Championship (1 time, inaugural)
  - UWN World Championship Tournament (2020)
