= UWN Heritage Heavyweight Championship =

Professional wrestling championship

Details
- Promotion: Championship Wrestling (United Wrestling Network)
- Date established: October 21, 2006
- Current champion: Maximilien
- Date won: November 18, 2025 (aired December 13, 2025)

Other names
- NWA Heritage Championship; CWFH Heritage Heavyweight Championship
Statistics
- First champion: Adam Pearce
- Longest reign: Peter Avalon (672 days)
- Shortest reign: Shaun Ricker (<1 day)
- Oldest champion: Kevin Martenson (41 years)
- Youngest champion: Jordan Cruz (24 years)
- Heaviest champion: Willie Mack (280 lb.)
- Lightest champion: Scorpio Sky (176 lb.)

The UWN Heritage Heavyweight Championship is a title controlled by the United Wrestling Network, and defended in Championship Wrestling. The title was established on October 21, 2006 as the NWA Heritage Championship.

== Title history ==
On January 1, 2012, the championship was abandoned after champion Atsushi Sawada lost the championship belt during the 2011 Tōhoku earthquake and tsunami. On May 5, 2013, Scorpio Sky pinned Shaun Ricker in a rematch from the Red Carpet Rumble tournament, from earlier that day, to re-establish the title as the CWFH Heritage Heavyweight Championship.

=== Names ===
Name	Years
NWA Heritage Championship (later CWFH Heritage Heavyweight Championship)	October 21, 2006 – May 8, 2021
UWN Heritage Heavyweight Championship	May 8, 2021 – present

=== Reigns ===
Key
No.	Overall reign number
Reign	Reign number for the specific champion
Days	Number of days held
N/A	Unknown information
†	Championship change is unrecognized by the promotion

No.	Champion	Championship change			Reign statistics		Notes	Ref.
No.	Champion	Date	Event	Location	Reign	Days	Notes	Ref.
National Wrestling Alliance (NWA)
1	Adam Pearce	October 21, 2006	AWS Halloween Slaughterhouse III	Industry, CA	1	182	Defeated The Plague in a tournament final to become the inaugural champion.	
2	Sean Waltman	April 21, 2007	NWA Pro Wrestling Summit	El Paso, TX	1	8	Aired on the January 23, 2008 edition of NWA Wrestling Showcase.	
3	Adam Pearce	April 29, 2007	NWA Pro Wrestling Summit	Loredo, TX	2	378		
—	Vacated	May 11, 2008	—	—	—	—	Adam Pearce relinquished the championship as he was already holding NWA World Heavyweight Championship.	
4	T. J. Perkins	June 1, 2008	M1W	Santa Ana, CA	1	194	Perkins won a battle royal to win the vacant championship at NWA Mach One Wrestling's debut show.	
5	Ryan Taylor	December 12, 2008	EWF Holiday Fear 2008	Covina, CA	1	122	Taylor won the championship in a belt on a pole match.	
6	Oliver John	April 13, 2009	PWR	Las Vegas, NV	1	474	This was a four–way elimination match also involving Chris Hero and Steve Anthony.	
7	Atsushi Sawada	July 31, 2010	PWR	Watsonville, CA	1	519		
—	Vacated	January 1, 2012	—	—	—	—	The championship was vacated due to the effects and aftermath of the 2011 Tōhoku earthquake and tsunami. Another version of the NWA Heritage Championship was introduced by NWA Circle City Wrestling on January 23, 2016.	
United Wrestling Network
8	Shaun Ricker	May 5, 2013	Championship Wrestling From Hollywood season 3 episode 27	Anaheim, CA	1	<1	Ricker won a Red Carpet Rumble match to win the vacant championship. Aired on tape delay on May 19, 2013.	
9	Scorpio Sky	May 5, 2013	CWFH TV Taping	Anaheim, CA	1	252	This was a Loser Leaves Hollywood match. This match was scheduled to air on June 2, 2013 on tape delay, but was never aired due to the controversial finish; the title was later officially changed to the CWFH Heritage Heavyweight Championship.	
10	Ricky Mandel	January 12, 2014	Championship Wrestling From Hollywood season 3 episode 15	Port Hueneme, CA	1	224		
11	The Hobo	August 24, 2014	Championship Wrestling From Hollywood TV Taping	Port Hueneme, CA	1	182		
12	Johnny Yuma	February 22, 2015	Unknown	Port Hueneme, CA	1	182		
13	Peter Avalon	August 23, 2015	Unknown	Port Hueneme, CA	1	672		
14	Tito Escondido	June 25, 2017	CWFH Red Carpet Rumble 2017	Port Hueneme, CA	1	308		
15	Willie Mack	April 29, 2018	CWFH TV Taping	Port Hueneme, CA	1	168		
—	Vacated	October 14, 2018	—	—	—	—	Championship vacated for unknown reasons.	
16	Royce Isaacs	October 14, 2018	Unknown	Port Hueneme, CA	1	56		
17	Andy Brown	December 9, 2018	Unknown	Port Hueneme, CA	1	252		
18	Watts	August 18, 2019	Red Carpet Rumble	Port Hueneme, CA	1	384	This was a Red Carpet Rumble match.	
19	Ray Rosas	September 5, 2020	CWFH TV Taping	Port Hueneme, CA	1	84		
20	Jordan Clearwater	November 28, 2020	CWFH TV Taping	Port Hueneme, CA	1	28		
21	Richie Slade	December 26, 2020	CWFH TV Taping	Port Hueneme, CA	1	133		
22	Jordan Cruz	May 8, 2021	Halston Boddy's Coastline Clash	Port Hueneme, CA	1	374	Renamed to the UWN Heritage Heavyweight Championship during Cruz's reign.	
23	Zicky Dice	May 17, 2022	Championship Wrestling presented by CarShield	Irvine, CA	1	182	This was a three-way match also involving Danny Rivera. This aired on tape delay on June 12.	
24	Kevin Martenson	November 15, 2022	Championship Wrestling presented by CarShield	Irvine, CA	1	467	This aired on tape delay on December 4.	
—	Vacated	February 25, 2024	—	—	—	—	Kevin Martenson relinquished the championship after leaving the UWN. This aired on tape delay on March 24.	
25	EJ Sparks	February 25, 2025	Championship Wrestling presented by CarShield	Irvine, CA	1	295	Defeated Brandon Cutler, Evan Daniels, Jordan Oasis, and Stunt Marshall in a five-way match to win the vacant title. This aired on tape delay on April 13.	
26	Maximilien	November 18, 2025	Championship Wrestling presented by CarShield	Oxnard, CA	1	29+	This aired on tape delay on December 13.	

== Combined reigns ==
As of December 17, 2025.

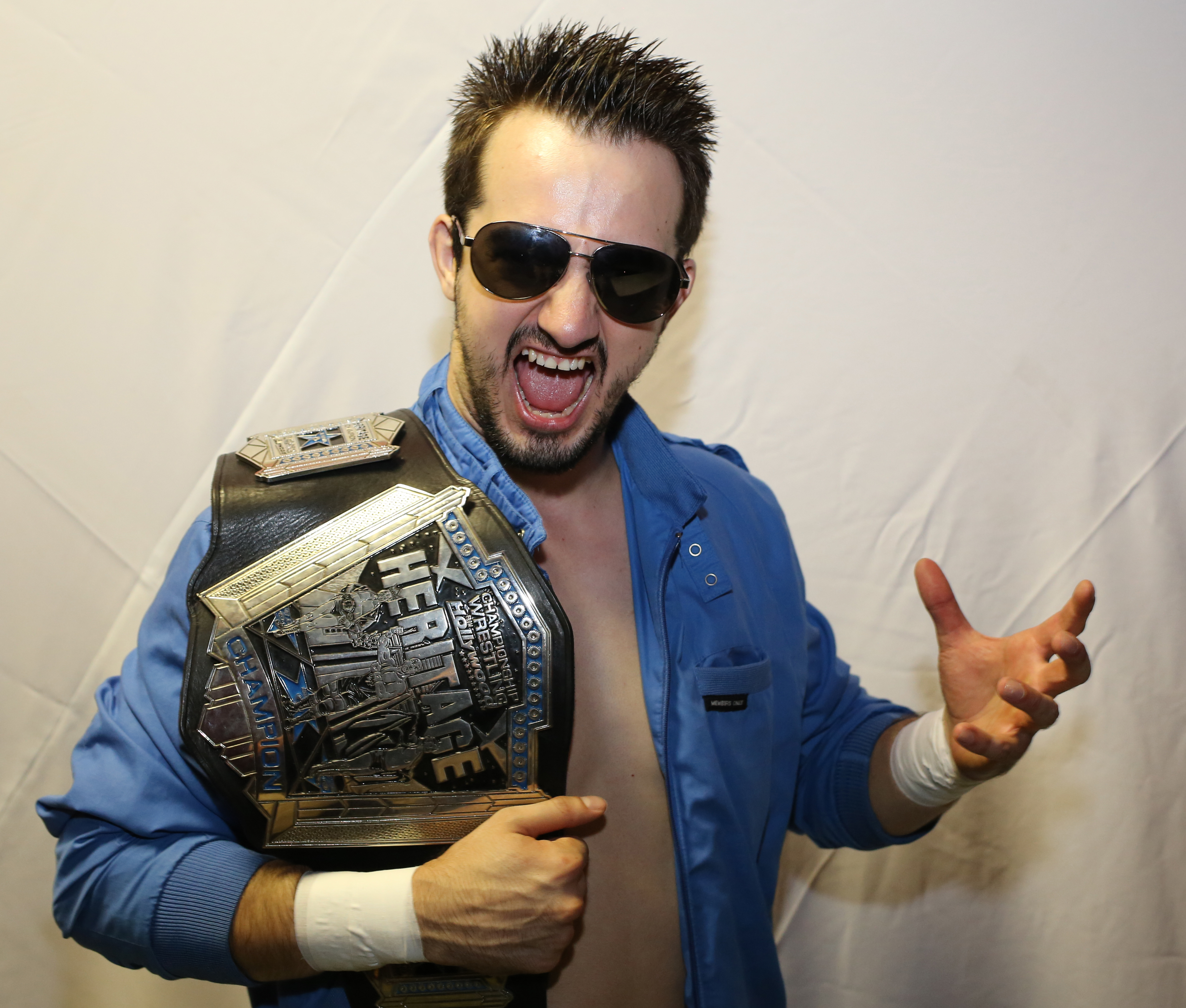
Record longest reigning champion Peter Avalon

†	Indicates the current champion

Rank	Wrestler	No. of reigns	Combined days
1	Peter Avalon	1	672
2	Adam Pearce	2	560
3	Atsushi Sawada	1	519
4	Oliver John	1	474
5	Kevin Martenson	1	467
6	Watts	1	384
7	Jordan Cruz	1	374
8	Tito Escondido	1	308
9	EJ Sparks	1	267
10	Andy Brown	1	252
10	Scorpio Sky	1	252
12	Ricky Mandel	1	224
13	T. J. Perkins	1	194
14	Zicky Dice	1	183
15	The Hobo	1	182
15	Johnny Yuma	1	182
17	Willie Mack	1	168
18	Richie Slade	1	133
19	Ryan Taylor	1	122
20	Ray Rosas	1	84
21	Royce Isaacs	1	56
22	Maximilien †	1	29+
23	Jordan Clearwater	1	28
24	Sean Waltman	1	8
25	Shaun Ricker	1	<1

== See also ==
- NWA World Heavyweight Championship
- NWA Heritage Championship
- UWN Television Championship
