= Clark Connors =

American professional wrestler (born 1993)

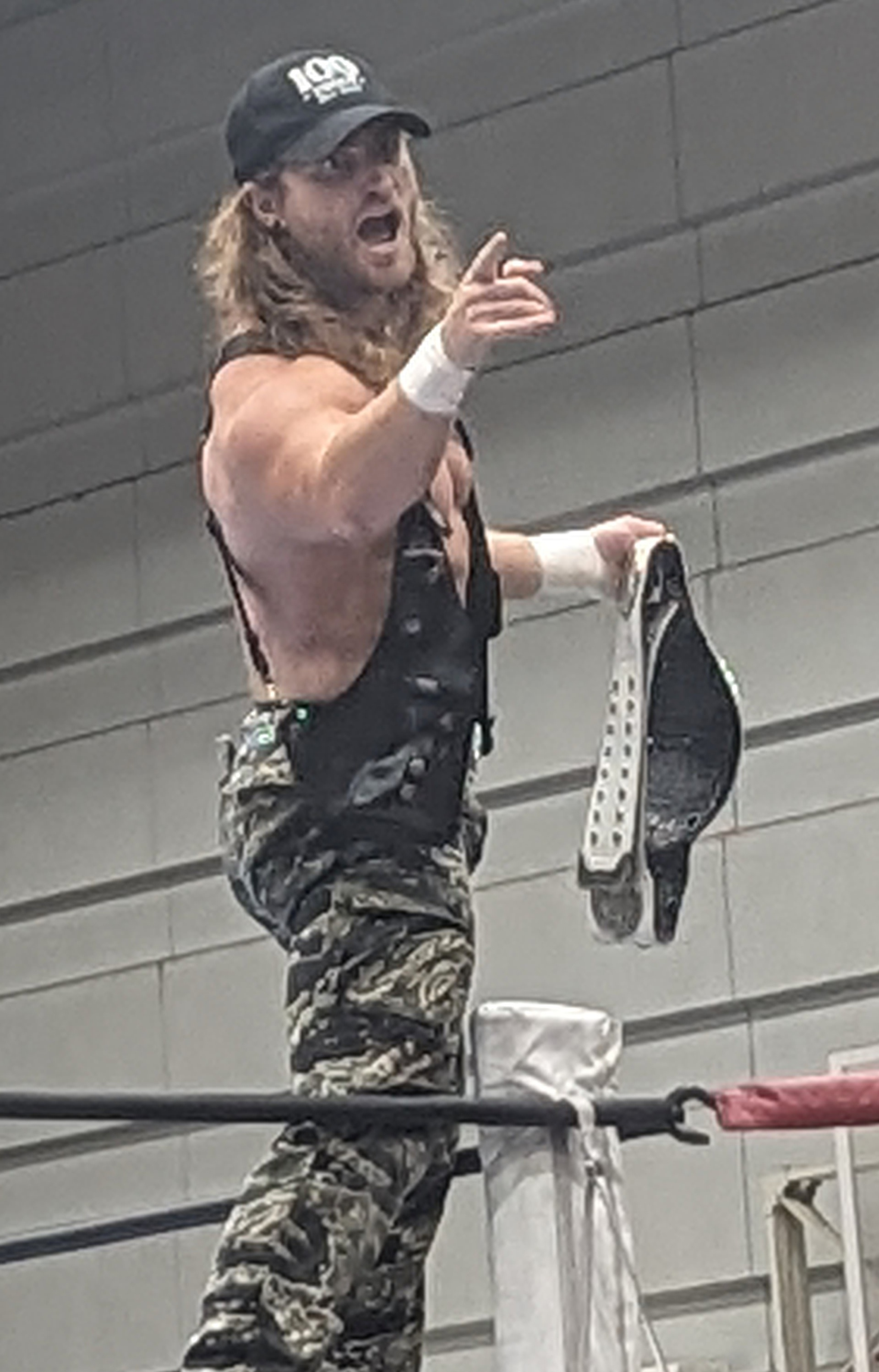
- Connors in April 2024

Personal information
- Born: Connor Deutsch; October 6, 1993 (age 33) Snoqualmie, Washington, U.S.

Professional wrestling career
- Ring name: Clark Connors
- Billed height: 5 ft 8 in (1.73 m)
- Billed weight: 202 lb (92 kg)
- Billed from: Snoqualmie, Washington, U.S.
- Trained by: Buddy Wayne; Lance Storm; Katsuyori Shibata; NJPW L.A. Dojo
- Debut: April 15, 2017

Connor Deutsch (born October 6, 1993), better known by his ring name Clark Connors, is an American professional wrestler. As of March 2026, he is signed to All Elite Wrestling (AEW), where he is one-half of The Dogs alongside David Finlay as members of The Cut stable. He is also a former AEW World Trios Champion.

He began his professional wrestling career in April 2017, working mainly for Canadian independent promotions such as All-Star Wrestling and West Coast Wrestling Connection. He then signed with New Japan Pro-Wrestling (NJPW) and entered the LA Dojo under the mentorship of Katsuyori Shibata in 2018. As a "young lion", he won the 2020 Lion's Break Crown and primarily performed on the Strong brand on of NJPW. In June 2023, he joined Bullet Club and its War Dogs sub-group, where he became a two-time IWGP Junior Heavyweight Tag Team Champion with Drilla Moloney. He departed NJPW in January 2026 and signed with AEW that March.

== Professional wrestling career ==
=== Early career (2017–2018) ===
Connors made his debut on April 15, 2017, working mainly for Canadian independent promotions such as All-Star Wrestling and West Coast Wrestling Connection. He also appeared for DEFY Wrestling, in his home state of Washington in the United States.

=== New Japan Pro-Wrestling (2018–2026) ===
==== Young Lion (2018–2020) ====
In 2018, Connors entered the New Japan Pro-Wrestling LA Dojo, as the first class along with Karl Fredericks and Alex Coughlin, training under Katsuyori Shibata. Connors made his in-ring debut beating Coughlin in a dark match at Fighting Spirit Unleashed. Connors visited Japan for the first time as a representative of the LA Dojo at the Young Lion Cup held in September 2019 and came third in the tournament along with Coughlin with 8 points. Over the next few months, Connors would lose to many New Japan wrestlers and draw to his fellow young lions, which is common for young lions during their training. Through New Japan's partnership's with other promotions, Connors was also able to make appearances for Ring of Honor and Revolution Pro Wrestling.

In July and August 2019, Connors and Fredericks teamed up with Shibata's close friend Kenta in tag team matches during the G1 Climax 29 tournament, in which Kenta was competing. This led to a feud with young lions Ren Narita and Yota Tsuji, who were young lions training in the Japanese New Japan Dojo. On the final day, Connors and Fredericks defeated Narita and Tsuji in a tag team match. Connors returned to the US to compete in the Super-J Cup, but was defeated in the first round by T. J. Perkins. After the tournament, Connors began to team frequently with TJP, including in that years Super Junior Tag League, where the team finished with 2 points, with a record of 1 win and 6 losses, only beating the team of Tiger Mask and Yuya Uemura, therefore failing to advance to the tournament finals. On January 4, 2020, at Wrestle Kingdom 14, Connors, Fredericks, Coughlin and Toa Henare defeated Tencozy (Satoshi Kojima and Hiroyoshi Tenzan), Yota Tsuji and Yuya Uemura in an eight-man tag-team match.

==== NJPW Strong and Wild Rhino (2020–2022) ====
In March 2020, New Japan suspended all of its activities, due to the COVID-19 pandemic, causing American-based talent, such as Connors to not be able to travel to Japan. Therefore, Connors appeared primarily on New Japan's new American-based show NJPW Strong. In September, Connors participated in the Lion's Break Crown. He defeated Jordan Clearwater in the first round and Logan Riegal in the semi-finals. In the tournament finals, he defeated Danny Limelight to win the tournament, his first tournament win in his New Japan career. Connors again participated in the Super-J Cup but was once again defeated in the first round, this time by Chris Bey. During this time, Connors began referring to himself as a "Wild Rhino" and it was confirmed by Shibata he was no longer a young lion.

The following year in March, Connors defeated TJP to qualify for a place in the New Japan Cup USA tournament, however he was defeated by Lio Rush in the first round. Connors then entered New Japan's Tag Team Turbulence Tournament, once again teaming with TJP, but they lost to eventual winners The Good Brothers, in the first round. In October, during NJPW Strong's Autumn Attack, TJP turned on the LA Dojo and joined United Empire, this led to the LA Dojo beginning a feud, where they would mainly lose to the group on Strong. This ended when in January 2022, at New Beginning in USA, where Connors defeated TJP. Connors challenged for the Strong Openweight Championship at Strong Style Evolved but was defeated by champion Tom Lawlor. In March, the LA Dojo, which was still represented by graduates like Connors, Coughlin and Fredericks, began a feud with All Elite Wrestling's The Factory as they fought over which was the superior wrestling developmental system. This led to a match at Windy City Riot, in which Connors, Fredericks and Yuya Uemura, lost to The Factory's Aaron Solo, Nick Comoroto and Q. T. Marshall. Soon after, Connors and other LA Dojo members made their debuts on the May 10 episode of Dark, saving the LA Dojo's The DKC and Kevin Knight from a post-match attack by The Factory. The following week, LA Dojo members defeated The Factory in a ten-man tag team match.

On May 1, Connors was announced for the 2022 edition of the Best of the Super Juniors, making his return to Japan since his graduation. He competed in the A-Block, finishing with a record of 4 wins and 5 losses, resulting in 8 points, therefore failing to advance to the finals. On the day of the finals, Connors teamed with Titán, Yoh and Robbie Eagles in a losing effort to Wheeler Yuta, El Lindaman, Ace Austin and Alex Zayne.

Connors was scheduled to compete at Music City Mayhem in late July, challenging for the MLW National Openweight Championship against champion Davey Richards, however, it was revealed Connors was injured and suffering from a herniated disc in his back, therefore he was replaced by Rocky Romero. Connors returned 3 months later at Rumble on 44th Street. After being escorted to the ring by Ken Shamrock, Connors lost to Minoru Suzuki. Connors returned to Japan, teaming with Ryusuke Taguchi in the Super Junior Tag League. The duo finished with a record of 6 points, failing to advance to the finals.

==== Bullet Club War Dogs (2023–2026) ====
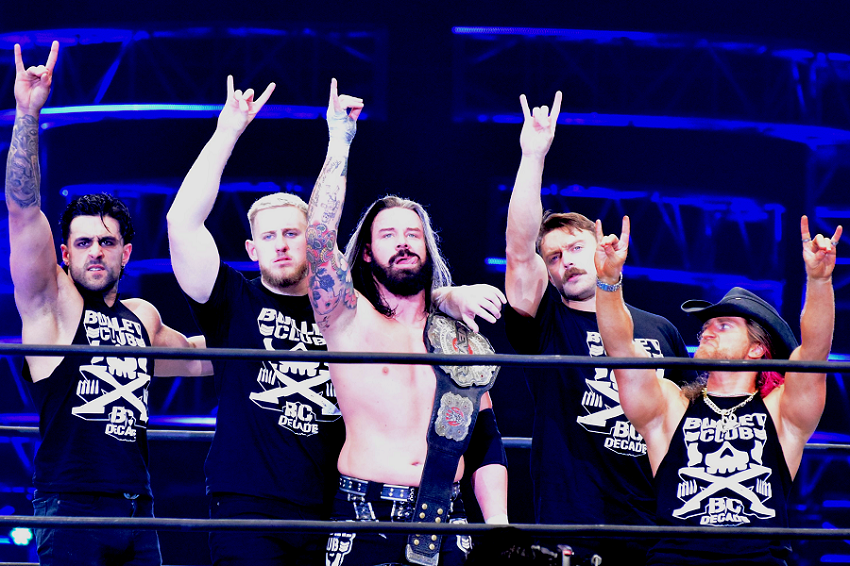
Connors (far right) with other members of the War Dogs sub-group in June 2023

On February 18 at Battle in the Valley, Connors faced Zack Sabre Jr. for the NJPW World Television Championship, but was defeated. On the March 9 episode of Ring of Honor Wrestling, Connors returned to Ring of Honor for the first time in 4 years, challenging Wheeler Yuta to a match for his ROH Pure Championship, after Yuta had called out the LA Dojo members, which Yuta accepted. The following week, Yuta defeated Connors to retain the Pure title. On March 30, Connors competed at Multiverse United, a co-produced event between NJPW and Impact Wrestling, where he competed in a Six-way Scramble match for the Impact X Division Championship, but failed to win the title.

On April 15 at Capital Collision, Connors teamed with Chaos' Chuck Taylor, Lio Rush and Rocky Romero and LA Dojo teammate The DKC in a ten-man tag-team match, losing to Kevin Knight, Kushida, Gabriel Kidd, Mike Bailey and Volador Jr. After the match, Connors attacked The DKC, thus turning heel for the first time in NJPW. Later at the event, Connors joined Bullet Club leader David Finlay in the ring, where he officially joined the stable. The following day at Collision in Philadelphia, Connors defeated The DKC.

Connors returned to Japan in May to compete in the 2023 Best of the Super Juniors tournament, competing in the B block. Connors finished with a tally of 8 points, failing to advance to the semi-finals. At Dominion 6.4 in Osaka-jo Hall, Connors confronted new IWGP Junior Heavyweight Tag Team Champions, Catch 2/2 (Francesco Akira and TJP), only for their United Empire stablemate Dan Moloney to attack the duo from behind, joining Connors in Bullet Club. On July 4 on Night 1 of NJPW Independence Day, Connors and Moloney defeated Catch 2/2 to win the IWGP Junior Heavyweight Tag Team Championships, marking both men's first NJPW championships. The following night, the duo made their first title defence, defeating Chaos (Rocky Romero and Yoh). The duo made another successful title defence at Destruction in Ryōgoku on October 9, defeating Intergactic Jet Setters (Kushida and Kevin Knight). 5 days later, the duo made another successful defence against Leon Slater and Cameron Khai, at Royal Quest III. Later in the month, Connors and Moloney entered the Super Junior Tag League. The duo finished their tournament campaign with 10 points, failing to advance to the finals. Following the tournament final, the duo attacked tournament winners Catch 2/2, ahead of their scheduled title defence against the duo at Wrestle Kingdom 18. Ahead of the match at Wrestle Kingdom, the two teams faced off in NJPW's first ever coffin match, which was won by Bullet Club, after they locked TJP in the coffin. At the event, Akira and TJP defeated Connors and Moloney, ending the duo's reign at 184 days.

Connors attempted to rebound from his loss at Wrestle Kingdom, teaming with Alex Coughlin on January 13 to challenge Guerrillas of Destiny (Hikuleo and El Phantasmo) for the Strong Openweight Tag Team Championships, but they were defeated. On February 4, Connors and Moloney defeated Catch 2/2 to regain the IWGP Junior Heavyweight Tag Team Championships. Bullet Club Wardogs continued to feud with United Empire throughout the month, eventually leading to a Ten-man Dog Pound steel cage match at The New Beginning in Osaka. At the event, Bullet Club defeated United Empire. In April at Sakura Genesis, Connors and Moloney successfully retained their titles against both Catch 2/2 and Intergalactic Jet Setters. Later that month, the duo defended their titles against Los Ingobernables de Japon (Hiromu Takahashi and Bushi). In May, Connors entered his third Best of the Super Juniors tournament, where he was drawn into the A Block. Connors finished his tournament campaign with 8 points, narrowly missing out on advancing to the semi final round following a loss to Yoshinobu Kanemaru in his final A block match. Following the conclusion of the tournament, Connors returned to tag team action alongside Moloney, where in June, the duo defeated The Mighty Don't Kneel (Kosei Fujita and Robbie Eagles) to retain their tag team titles. In October at King of Pro-Wrestling, Connors and Moloney lost their IWGP Junior Heavyweight Tag Team Championships to Intergalactic Jet Setters (Kevin Knight and Kushida), ending their second reign at 253 days and 3 successful title defences.

Connors and Moloney attempted to rebound following this loss later that same month, where they competed in the A block of the Super Junior Tag League. The duo ended their campaign with 6 points narrowly missing out on a spot in the finals. Following TMDK's tournament victory in the finals in November at Power Struggle, Connors and Moloney attacked the group, as well as Catch 2/2 and Junior Heavyweight tag team champions Intergalactic Jet Setters. The altercation set up a Tokyo Terror ladder match for the IWGP Junior Heavyweight Tag Team Championship between the four teams at Wrestle Kingdom 19. On January 4, 2025, at the event, TMDK won the titles.

Following Moloney's announcement to join the heavyweight division on January 5 at New Year Dash!!, Connors teamed with his fellow Bullet Club Wardogs members for the following months. In March Connors began to focus on singles competition, challenging IWGP Junior Heavyweight Champion El Desperado to a match for his title, which Desperado immediantly accepted. The challenge was laid out as a rematch from their match in the prior year's Best of the Super Juniors tournament, where Desperado defeated Connors by DQ, following an excessive attack from Connors, who also unmasked Desperado. On April 4, Desperado defeated Connors to retain his title in a hardcore match.

After Wrestle Kingdom 20, at New Year Dash!! on January 5, 2026, Yota Tsuji announced the dissolution of Bullet Club and Unaffilated, replacing the alliance with Unbound Co., which was a complete merger. That same event, Connors wrestled his final NJPW match, where he teamed with stablemates Gabe Kidd and Hiromu Takahashi in a losing effort to the United Empire (Andrade El Ídolo, Francesco Akira, and Jakob Austin Young). It was later reported that Connors' NJPW contract had expired and he would be exploring his options, ending his eight-year tenure with the promotion.

=== All Elite Wrestling (2022; 2025–present) ===
==== Sporadic appearances (2022, 2025) ====
Connors was announced to be in the NJPW qualifying bracket for a chance to advance to Forbidden Door to be a part of a four-way match to crown the inaugural AEW All-Atlantic Champion. In the first qualifier Connors defeated Tomoaki Honma, but lost in the final qualifier to Tomohiro Ishii, who advanced to the PPV. However, it was later revealed that Ishii had suffered a left knee injury, therefore Connors took his place at the PPV, facing Pac, Malakai Black and Miro for the All-Atlantic championship in a losing effort.

Connors returned to AEW on the March 1, 2025 episode of Collision, losing to Swerve Strickland. On August 24 at Forbidden Door Zero Hour, Connors teamed with Bullet Club War Dogs stablemates Drilla Moloney and Robbie X to unsuccessfully challenge The Opps (Samoa Joe, Katsuyori Shibata, and Powerhouse Hobbs) for the AEW World Trios Championship.

==== The Dogs (2026–present) ====
In January 2026, Connors and his Unbound Co. stablemate Gabe Kidd began feuding with Darby Allin. The duo of Connors and Kidd would be known as "The Dogs" (a reference to their former NJPW stable, Bullet Club War Dogs). On the March 4 episode of Dynamite, Connors and Kidd were joined by their former Bullet Club leader David Finlay in The Dogs. It was later announced that all three were now signed to AEW. At Revolution on March 15, The Dogs were defeated by Allin, Orange Cassidy, and Roderick Strong in a tornado trios match. On the April 8 tapings of Collision, The Dogs defeated Místico and JetSpeed (Kevin Knight and "Speedball" Mike Bailey) to win the AEW World Trios Championship, marking Connors' first championship in AEW. AEW officially began recognizing this reign when the episode aired on tape delay on April 11. They then lost the Trios Title to The Conglomeration (Orange Cassidy, Roderick Strong, and Kyle O'Reilly) at Dynasty on April 12, ending their reign at 4 days, although AEW officially recognizes that their reign only lasted one day. At Forbidden Door on June 28, Connors and Finlay failed to capture the AEW World Tag Team Championship from Cage and Cope (Christian Cage and Adam Copeland) after Finlay was attacked during the match by his former NJPW rival, a returning Jay White. On July 26 at Redemption, Connors and Finlay defeated White and his Bang Bang Gang stablemate Juice Robinson in a Double Chain match due to interference from members of the Death Riders. On August 30 at All In, The Dogs failed to regain the AEW World Trios Championship in a Trios Roulette Royale. On September 26 at the Saturday Tailgate Brawl edition of All Out, Connors and Finlay teamed with Daniel Garica and Wheeler Yuta of the Death Riders, in a losing effort against the Bang Bang Gang (Jay White, Ace Austin, Austin Gunn, and Colten Gunn) in a Tornado Tailgate Brawl, ending their feud.

On the October 21 episode of Dynamite, Connors and Finlay kicked Kidd out the Dogs, and aligned with the Bang Bang Gang after attacking the Death Riders and the Conglomeration. After initially naming the alliance The Last Outfit on the October 24 episode of Collision, stable leader Jay White announced that the group would instead be known as The Cut. At Full Gear on November 14, The Cut defeated the Death Riders and the Conglomeration in Anarchy in the Arena.

== Championships and accomplishments ==
- All Elite Wrestling
  - AEW World Trios Championship (1 time) – with David Finlay and Gabe Kidd
- DEFY Wrestling
  - DEFY World Championship (1 time)
  - Super 8XGP Tournament (2025)
- New Japan Pro-Wrestling
  - IWGP Junior Heavyweight Tag Team Championship (2 times) – with Drilla Moloney
  - Lion's Break Crown (2020)
- Pro Wrestling Illustrated
  - Ranked No. 154 of the top 500 singles wrestlers in the PWI 500 in 2025
