= United Wrestling Network =

Wrestling governing body

- Acronym: UWN
- Founded: 2013
- Style: Professional wrestling
- Headquarters: United States
- Founder: David Marquez
- Owner: David Marquez
- Parent: Championship Television, Inc.
- Website: https://www.hollywoodwrestling.com/ https://www.championshiptelevision.com/

The United Wrestling Network (UWN) is a governing body for professional wrestling promotions in the United States that was formed in 2013 by David Marquez.

== History ==
=== Formation and Early years ===
On October 21, 2013, David Marquez, promoter of Championship Wrestling from Hollywood (CWFH), announced the creation of a new governing body called the United Wrestling Network (UWN). Similar to the National Wrestling Alliance (NWA), of which CWFH was formerly a member promotion, the UWN sees its affiliated promotions "pool their resources" and work together to secure national television advertising. For a wrestling company to join the group, they must have a television broadcast agreement or agree to produce their own broadcasts. Soon after its formation, an offshoot called Championship Wrestling from Arizona was launched.

In the Summer of 2014, CWFH announced a tournament to crown the first UWN World Heavyweight Champion, who would be recognized across the UWN's affiliates. However, the tournament wouldn't begin until six years later.

On May 22, 2017, Pro Wrestling Zero1 became the first Japanese affiliate of the UWN.

In 2019, independent wrestling personalities Dustin and Maria Starr, along with Marquez, launched the Championship Wrestling from Memphis program for WLMT-TV CW30 Memphis.

On August 10, 2020, UWN announced a partnership with the NWA to produce Primetime Live, a series of events aired weekly from Long Beach, California at the Thunder Studios. Debuting on September 15, Primetime Live's first event saw NWA Worlds Heavyweight Champion Nick Aldis defend the title against Mike Bennett in the main event.

On the October 13 Primetime Live event, David Marquez revealed the UWN World Championship for the first time and re-announced the eight-man tournament to crown the inaugural champion. One year later, after the finals were postponed due to an injury, the tournament and inaugural championship was ultimately won by Chris Dickinson on October 2, 2021.

During the Summer of 2021, UWN announced the launch of Championship Wrestling from Atlanta, which will air on Peachtree TV, and be taped from Center Stage in Atlanta, Georgia. On July 15, Marquez announced on Twitter that Championship Wrestling from Atlanta would premiere on Saturday September 2 at 10 p.m

=== 2022–present: Championship Wrestling relaunch ===
On February 17, 2022, UWN announced in a press release that they will be merging Championship Wrestling from Hollywood, Championship Wrestling from Arizona and Championship Wrestling from Atlanta into a singular entity under the Championship Wrestling presented by CarShield branding. The first taping for the new show took place at the Irvine Improv in Irvine, California on March 22. The new series would premiere on the weekend of April 24, 2022.

During the same year, Championship Wrestling from Memphis changed its name to Memphis Wrestling, becoming more of a stand-alone promotion. The name change was publicly endorsed by Jerry Jarrett on November 22, 2022. Despite the shared name, UWN's Memphis Wrestling promotion has no connections to Corey Maclin's promotion of the same name or any of the previous Memphis territories.

In February 2023, ASM Global announced the launch of Derby City Wrestling in Louisville, Kentucky, with first TV tapings to be held on March 26. The show would premiere on the weekend of April 9, airing Saturdays at noon on WMYO.

On January 25, 2024, Reality of Wrestling (ROW), Memphis Wrestling, and Championship Wrestling announced a talent exchange program.

On May 1, 2024, Championship Television launched a GoFundMe campaign seeking $1.5 million to produce live television programming.

On July 30, 2026, UWN content was added to the MyAEW streaming service.

== Championships ==
Championship	Current champion(s)	Previous champion(s)	Date won	Days held	Location
UWN World Championship	Jordan Cruz	Danny Limelight	July 1, 2025	406+	Irvine, California
UWN Women's World Championship	Big Mama	Inaugural	February 25, 2025	532+	Irvine, California
UWN Heritage Heavyweight Championship	Maximilien	EJ Sparks	November 18, 2025	266+	Oxnard, California
UWN Television Championship	Evan Daniels	Zicky Dice	April 29, 2025	469+	Irvine, California
UWN Tag Team Championship	5150 (Danny Limelight and Slice Boogie)	TMZ (Shane Haste, Bad Dude Tito and Che Cabrera)	September 23, 2025	322+	Oxnard, California

== Members ==
=== Current ===
Promotion	Representative(s)	Location	Years affiliated
Championship Wrestling	Nikko Marquez	California	2013–present Previously known as Championship Wrestling from Hollywood
Memphis Wrestling	Dustin Starr	Tennessee	2019–present Previously known as Championship Wrestling from Memphis
Gotham Wrestling	Unknown	New York	2025–present
Coastal Championship Wrestling	Pablo Márquez and Dan Ackerman	Florida	2025–present
1 Fall Wrestling	QT Marshall	Georgia	2025–present

=== Former ===
Promotion	Representative(s)	Location	Years affiliated
Championship Wrestling from Arizona	Peter Avalon and Mick Greenwood	Arizona	2013–2022; Merged with Championship Wrestling from Hollywood and Championship Wrestling from Atlanta to form Championship Wrestling
New York Wrestling Connection	John Curse	New York	2013–N/A
Pro Wrestling Zero1	Shinjiro Otani	Japan	2017–2022
Championship Wrestling from Atlanta	Unknown	Georgia	2021–2022; Merged with Championship Wrestling from Hollywood and Championship Wrestling from Arizona to form Championship Wrestling
Main Event Pro Wrestling	Mark Vaughn	Texas	2015–2020
Combat Zone Wrestling	David John Markland	New Jersey	2016–2020
Women Superstars United	David John Markland	New Jersey	2016–2020
Derby City Wrestling	Unknown	Kentucky	2023

== See also ==
- List of independent wrestling promotions in the United States
