= Zicky Dice =

American professional wrestler

Personal information
- Born: Nick Zoppo

Professional wrestling career
- Ring name: Zicky Dice
- Billed from: Cocoa Beach, Florida
- Trained by: Seth Rollins; Marek Brave
- Debut: 2015

Nick Zoppo best known as Zicky Dice, is an American professional wrestler, currently performs on the independent circuit. He is best known for his time in Impact Wrestling and the National Wrestling Alliance (NWA), where he former one-time NWA World Television Champion.

== Early life ==
Dice was trained in the Black and Brave Wrestling Academy by Seth Rollins and Marek Brave. He is from Cocoa Beach, Florida.

== Professional wrestling career ==
He participated in a tournament to crown the revived NWA World Television Championship, defeating Caleb Konley in the first round but being defeated by Dan Maff in the second round. He would win the title on January 26, at NWA Powerrr (aired on March 3) when he defeated Ricky Starks. During the COVID-19 pandemic, the NWA entered in a hiatus and Dice's contract was set to expire on December. Dice would lose the title against Elijah Burke during a United Wrestling Network event and left NWA.

After leaving the NWA, Dice would sign a contract with Impact Wrestling. He made his debut on September 1, 2021, joining Brian Myers' stable Learning Tree and later with Johnny Swinger. In July 2023, it was reported that Dice had "finished up" in Impact.

In September 2023, Dice returned to the NWA, winning a Fatal Four-Way to earn a match against Mims for the vacant NWA World Television Championship.

== Personal life ==
Zoppo is also the lead singer of the rock band Heart to Heart.

== Championships and accomplishments ==
- Championship Wrestling From Memphis
  - CWFM Internet Championship (1 time)
- Atomic Legacy Wrestling
  - ALW Hardcore Championship (1 time)
- National Wrestling Alliance
  - NWA World Television Championship (1 time)
- Pro Wrestling Illustrated
  - Ranked No. 278 of the top 500 singles wrestlers in the PWI 500 in 2020
- Southern Honor Wrestling
  - SHW Tag Team Championship (1 time) - with Ashton Starr
- United Wrestling Network
  - UWN Heritage Heavyweight Championship (1 time)
  - UWN Television Championship (1 time)
- Memphis Wrestling
  - Memphis Wrestling Internet Championship (1 time)
