= Professional wrestling in Mexico =

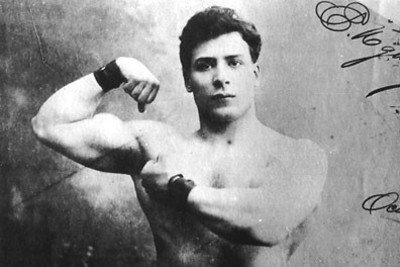
Enrique Ugartechea, a pioneer of professional wrestling in Mexico.

Professional wrestling in Mexico has existed since the late 19th century, but became popular in the 1930s following the formation of Empresa Mexicana de Lucha Libre, the first widespread Mexican professional wrestling promotion. Throughout the 20th century, professional wrestling established itself as one of the most popular sports in Mexico, so much so that it played an important role in national popular culture. Mexican professional wrestling has developed a distinct style and presentation known as "lucha libre", which is characterized by its colorful wrestling masks, rapid sequences of holds and maneuvers, spectacular high-flying techniques, and telenovela-inspired sports entertainment elements.

Professional wrestling often competed with boxing in television ratings, with both disciplines reaching their peaks in Mexico in the mid-to-late 20th century, though both continue to be popular in the country. The popularity of professional wrestling in Mexico has fluctuated over the years, and has experienced a major resurgence during the 2000s through 2020s with the "Místico Boom Period" and the airing of events on streaming services. With the rise of the popularity of mixed martial arts (MMA) in Mexico, some Mexican wrestlers have competed in that discipline, notably Alberto Del Rio (know as Dos Caras Jr.) and Brazo de Plata.

Unlike with other countries, professional wrestling is taken seriously by the Mexican sports press despite its predetermined nature and it is not considered a simple "spectacle" as it is in most parts of the world. Mexican news services and sports journalists do not report nor speculate on wrestlers' real names even if they know the names out of respect for lucha libre tradition, in which the true identity of masked wrestlers is kept secret from the general public. Certain Mexican wrestlers have transcended professional wrestling, notably El Santo, Blue Demon, and Mil Máscaras – collectively dubbed the Tres Grandes ("Big Three") of the Mexican wrestling tradition – became folk heroes and symbols of justice for the common man in Mexico through their appearances in luchador films.

With the globalization of professional wrestling, Mexican cities like Monterrey, Tijuana, and Mexico City have become important venues for foreign-based promotions on annual international tours.

== History ==
The origins of professional wrestling in Mexico date back to the 19th century with the introduction of Greco-Roman wrestling by French soldiers during the Second Franco-Mexican War. The first widely recognized Mexican wrestler was Enrique Ugartechea in 1863, who was known as the strongest man in the country, which caught the attention of brands like Spalding who sponsored him.

In 1910, Italian wrestler Giovanni Raicevich arrived in Mexico with his wrestling troupe. At the same time, Italian businessman Antonio Fournier brought his Teatro Colón wrestlers to Mexico, including famous catch wrestler Conde Koma, whose fighting style is considered the precursor of Brazilian jiu-jitsu. The rivalry between the two wrestling troupes caused a stir among the Mexican population, generating lucrative business for both. In 1921, Belgian wrestler Constant le Marin also arrived in Mexico with his company, introducing León Molero, who had been a middleweight European champion. Two years later, he returned to Mexico, bringing the Japanese wrestler Kawamura, who, along with Hércules Sampson, performed at the Frontón Nacional venue.

In September 1933, Salvador Lutteroth founded Empresa Mexicana de Lucha Libre (EMLL), the first widespread Mexican-owned professional wrestling promotion in Mexico. For founding EMLL, Lutteroth is considered the "father of Mexican professional wrestling". El Santo, Blue Demon, and Mil Máscaras – collectively dubbed the Tres Grandes ("Big Three") of the Mexican wrestling tradition – emerged as three of the biggest EMLL stars. The three would also wrestle for the Universal Wrestling Association (UWA), a major rival to EMLL in the 1970s and '80s. EMLL was later renamed as Consejo Mundial de Lucha Libre (CMLL). As an alternative to CMLL, AAA was founded in 1992 by Antonio Peña, who had previously worked for CMLL as a booker. Throughout the rest of the decade, AAA's popularity grew, collaborating with both World Championship Wrestling (WCW) in 1994 and the World Wrestling Federation (WWF, later WWE) in 1997; with the former, it co-hosted the When Worlds Collide event, and with the latter, it co-hosted the Royal Rumble event.

In the 2000s and early 2010s, Mexican professional wrestling experienced a major resurgence of popularity and mainstream awareness during CMLL's "Místico Boom Period", built around performers like Místico and Averno. In 2011, Místico departed CMLL to join the American-based WWE promotion, where he performed under the ring name "Sin Cara".

In the 2010s and 2020s, AAA and CMLL began airing their events on streaming platforms like Twitch and YouTube. In April 2025, AAA was acquired by WWE.

== Timeline of major events ==
1860s–1920s	– The first professional wrestling matches take place in Mexico
1933	– Empresa Mexicana de Lucha Libre (EMLL) is founded by Salvador Lutteroth
1934 or 1935	– El Santo, who becomes part of the "Big Three" of the Mexican lucha libre tradition with Blue Demon and Mil Máscaras, debuts as a professional wrestler
1950	– Professional wrestling events begin airing on Mexican television, culminating in the formation of Televicentro Mexico which holds record-breaking events built around Medico Asesino
1953	– EMLL joins the US-based National Wrestling Alliance (NWA) governing body, after which it is often referred to as "NWA-EMLL"
Mid-to-late 1950s	– Professional wrestling events are banned from airing on Mexican television, following the death of a child who was performing wrestling maneuvers
Mid-to-late 1950s	– Women's wrestling is banned from Mexico City by the Regent of Mexico City Ernesto P. Uruchurtu
1975	– The Universal Wrestling Association, a major rival to EMLL, is founded
1986	– The ban on women's wrestling in Mexico City is lifted
Early 1990s	– The ban on airing professional wrestling on television in Mexico is lifted
1991	– EMLL departs the NWA and is renamed to Consejo Mundial de Lucha Libre (CMLL)
1992	– AAA is founded by Antonio Peña
1993	– Triplemanía I, one of the first major events in AAA history, achieved the Mexican record attendance for wrestling (48,000+ people)
1993–1994	– The AAA-World Championship Wrestling partnership era, culminating in the 1994 When Worlds Collide event
2000	– Lucha Libre Femenil, one of the first all-female wrestling promotions in Mexico, is founded
2004	– World Wrestling Entertainment (WWE) holds its first house show in Mexico
2004–2011	– Místico Boom Period era
2011	– CMLL partners with New Japan Pro-Wrestling, the largest Japanese wrestling promotion
2025	– WWE acquires AAA
2025	– All Elite Wrestling holds its first event in Mexico, Grand Slam, in collaboration with CMLL

== Professional wrestling style ==
Lucha libre (translated as "freestyle wrestling") is the term used to describe the wrestling style created in Mexico, distinguished by its rapid sequences of holds and maneuvers, "high-flying" aerial techniques, and colorful masks. While in the rest of the world, the Mexican wrestling style is always known by its Spanish name, lucha libre (regardless of the language); in Mexico, it is also known as lucha libre mexicana (to differentiate it from other forms of professional wrestling and amateur wrestling), pancracio (the term used in ancient Greece to describe wrestling), and el arte de Gotch. Another distinguishing characteristic of lucha libre is its detailed system of weight classes, possibly inspired by boxing. Each weight class has an official upper weight limit that competitors must abide by and are monitored by the Mexico City Boxing and Wrestling Commission, but examples can be found from the history of lucha libre of wrestlers who are technically too heavy to compete in their weight class, including some who have held a weight class' title.

In 2018, the lucha libre wrestling style was declared an intangible cultural heritage of Mexico City by the head of the Government of Mexico City.

== Professional wrestling promotions ==
In Mexico, there are numerous professional wrestling promotions, but the two that dominate the modern industry are Consejo Mundial de Lucha Libre (CMLL) and Lucha Libre AAA Worldwide (AAA). CMLL is the oldest promotion in the world, having been founded in 1933; AAA was founded in the early 1990s. To a lesser extent, the International Wrestling Revolution Group (IWRG), founded in 1996, and The Crash Lucha Libre, founded in 2011, have emerged as other major national wrestling promotions in the country.

Notable active professional wrestling promotions in Mexico include:

Name	Promoter(s)	Years active	Notes
Consejo Mundial de Lucha Libre (CMLL)	Salvador Lutteroth III	1933–present	The oldest active professional wrestling promotion in the world.
Lucha Libre AAA Worldwide (AAA)	Marisela Peña; Dorian Roldán	1992–present	Founded as a break-away promotion from CMLL by Antonio Peña with the backing of Televisa.
International Wrestling Revolution Group (IWRG)	Cesar Moreno; Marco Moreno	1996–present	Based out of Arena Naucalpan in Naucalpan, State of Mexico.
The Crash Lucha Libre	Nacho de la O	2011–present	Based out of Auditorio Fausto Gutierrez Moreno in Tijuana, Baja California.
Toryumon Casa	Último Dragón	1997–present	Serves as the home promotion for Japanese wrestlers from Dragongate and Pro Wrestling Noah who have been sent on learning excursions in Mexico.
Lucha Libre Femenil (LLF)	Luciano Alberto Garcia de Luna	2000–present	One of the first women's wrestling promotions in Mexico.
Desastre Total Ultraviolento (DTU)	Crazy Boy	2007–present	A prominent Mexican lucha extrema (hardcore wrestling) promotion.
Alianza Universal De Lucha Libre (AULL)	Hector Guzman	1990–present	The sister promotion of Universal Wrestling Entertainment, a revival of the Universal Wrestling Association.

== National wrestling championships ==
The Mexican National Championships are a group of Mexico-specific professional wrestling championships that are sanctioned by the Mexico City Boxing and Wrestling Commission, the de facto national commission of lucha libre in Mexico. While the commission sanctions the championships, it does not promote the events in which the championships are defended, but rather allows the championships to be defended on the events of promotions like CMLL and AAA. The championships are intended to be held solely by Mexican nationals, though exceptions have been made, notably the Mexican National Lightweight Championship was held by Japanese wrestler Mishima Ota and the National Welterweight and Trios Championships were held by American wrestler Rey Mysterio. The earliest Mexican National Championship, the Mexican National Heavyweight Championship, was created in 1926 and bestowed to Mexican wrestler Francisco Aguayo by Mexican-Americans in the United States. Aguayo later brought the championship belt with him to Mexico and on June 21, 1934, firmly established it as a Mexican-based title with his victory over Manuel "El Toro" Hernández in the first championship match ever sanctioned by the Mexico City Boxing and Wrestling Commission. The Mexican National Heavyweight Championship is still promoted by CMLL, making it the oldest active championship in professional wrestling.

Over the years the commission has created a total of 13 different championships, seven of which are for various weight divisions in Mexico. Three of the championships are for various forms of male tag teams. They also created two championships for women's professional wrestling, a singles championship and a tag team championship. From 1993 through 2006, the commission sanctioned the Mexican National Mini-Estrella Championship, exclusively for Mini-Estrellas, participants in a Mexican form of midget wrestling. From 2008 through the early 2020s, the Mexican National Lightweight Championship was held by Mini-Estrella wrestlers. The commission's most recent championship addition was in 1996 when they created the Mexican National Atómicos Championship, contested for by teams of four, referred to in lucha libre as "Atómicos". Embracing a traditionalist view on professional wrestling, the commission typically only allows its championships to be defended in "normal matches", stripping Psicosis of the Mexican National Middleweight Championship for defending it in a hardcore match. However, at a later point, the commission allowed its Heavyweight Championship to be defended in a steel cage match on a Triplemanía event.

The Mexican National Championships have been promoted by a number of Mexican-based wrestling promotions over the years. CMLL, founded in 1933, has promoted the championships since their inception and currently promotes all remaining Mexican National Championships. In 1992, AAA was formed when booker Antonio Peña and a number of CMLL wrestlers broke away to create a new company. Several of the wrestlers that left were reigning Mexican National Champions and the commission allowed AAA to take promotional control of those championships at that point. In 2006, Mascarita Sagrada, the Mexican National Mini-Estrella Champion, left AAA while still holding the championship, rendering it inactive from that point on. From 2008 to 2011, AAA abandoned all their Mexican National Championships, instead choosing to focus on promoting AAA-branded championships.

The Mexican National Championships include:

Championship	Division	Created	Abandoned	Notes	Ref(s).
Featherweight Championship	57 kg (126 lb); 63 kg (139 lb)	February 25, 1938	1992	Was primarily promoted on the Mexican independent circuit.	
Lightweight Championship	63 kg (139 lb); 70 kg (150 lb)	June 28, 1934	—	Currently promoted by CMLL; was once promoted exclusively for Mini-Estrellas.	
Welterweight Championship	70 kg (150 lb); 77 kg (170 lb)	June 17, 1934	—	Currently promoted by CMLL.	
Middleweight Championship	82 kg (181 lb); 87 kg (192 lb)	1933	—	Currently promoted by CMLL.	
Light Heavyweight Championship	87 kg (192 lb); 97 kg (214 lb)	September 25, 1945	—	Currently promoted by CMLL.	
Cruiserweight Championship	97 kg (214 lb); 105 kg (231 lb)	November 13, 1983	December 8, 2008	Was primarily promoted by AAA.	
Heavyweight Championship	Over 105 kg (231 lb)	1926	—	Currently promoted by CMLL.	
Tag Team Championship	Two man tag teams	June 14, 1957	—	Currently promoted by CMLL.	
Trios Championship	Three man tag teams	March 10, 1985	—	Currently promoted by CMLL.	
Atómicos Championship	Four man tag teams	August 9, 1996	January 24, 2009	Was primarily promoted by AAA.	
Women's Championship	Women	1955	—	Currently promoted by CMLL.	
Women's Tag Championship	Female tag teams	August 10, 1990	—	Currently promoted by CMLL.	
Mini-Estrella Championship	Mini-Estrellas	January 8, 1993	2006	Was primarily promoted by AAA.	

== Foreign wrestling tours in Mexico ==
WWE, the world's largest professional wrestling company based in Stamford, Connecticut, has held annual tours in Mexico since 2004. The first event was held on April 3 of that year at Arena Monterrey in the city of the same name. After the success of the first WWE event in Mexico, WWE's Raw brand returned to Mexico in November 2004. In 2011, the Palacio de los Deportes in Mexico City would host the first Mexican television taping of WWE Raw; days later, the same venue was host to an episode of WWE SmackDown. As of July 2025, 90 WWE events have been held on Mexican soil.

Other non-Mexican professional wrestling companies have toured the country. Total Nonstop Action Wrestling (TNA) held a house show at Arena Monterrey in November 2006. In September 2019, British wrestling promotion Fight Club: Pro (FCP) held their first event in Mexico in collaboration with The Crash Lucha Libre. The following month in October 2019, Major League Wrestling (MLW) held their first event in Mexico in collaboration with The Crash Lucha Libre; MLW has since held collaborative events in Mexico with Lucha Libre AAA Worldwide (AAA) and Consejo Mundial de Lucha Libre (CMLL). On March 4, 2023, the National Wrestling Alliance (NWA) held their The World is a Vampire event in collaboration with AAA at Foro Sol in Mexico City; the event drew over 30,000 spectators, making it one of the highest attended wrestling events in the history of Mexico. On June 30, 2023, Japanese wrestling promotion New Japan Pro-Wrestling (NJPW) held their inaugural event in Mexico, Fantastica Mania México, in collaboration with CMLL; Fantastica Mania México has since become an annual collaborative event held by NJPW and CMLL. On June 18, 2025, All Elite Wrestling (AEW) held their Grand Slam event in Arena México.

== Mexican wrestlers abroad ==
Being a professional wrestling power, Mexico has exported a large number of professional wrestlers abroad, working for promotions such as WWE, New Japan Pro-Wrestling, All Elite Wrestling (AEW), Ring of Honor (ROH), and Pro Wrestling Noah, among others. Most of them (especially the masked ones) carry the Mexican lucha libre wrestling style with them, while others change their styles to better fit those of their adopted countries and promotions or mix the lucha libre style with other styles of professional wrestling.

Several Mexican wrestlers have won professional wrestling championships, including prestigious world championships, in a country other than their own. Alberto Del Rio has held the WWE Championship and WWE's World Heavyweight Championship, for a total of four reigns. In ROH, Bandido and Rush are two-time ROH World Champions, with Rush's second reign being the third-longest in the title's history. Blue Demon Jr., son of the eponymous legend, held the NWA World's Heavyweight Championship for 501 days. Pentagón Jr. won the Impact World Championship, although his reign was one of the shortest in the title's history (two days). El Hijo de Dr. Wagner Jr. has been GHC Heavyweight Champion in Pro Wrestling Noah, being to date the only Mexican to achieve a world heavyweight title in Japan. Mexican wrestler Luis Mante held the Open the Dream Gate Championship, an openweight championship in the Japanese Dragongate promotion. Thunder Rosa is the only Mexican woman to have held a world championship in the United States, winning both the NWA Women's Championship and the AEW Women's Championship.

Among the Mexican male wrestlers who have excelled abroad are:

- Aero Star
- Bandido
- Blue Demon Jr.
- Daga
- Diamante (also known as Luis Mante)
- Drago
- Dragon Lee
- Dos Caras Jr. (also known as Alberto Del Rio)
- El Hijo de Dr. Wagner Jr.
- El Hijo del Fantasma (also known as Santos Escobar)
- El Hijo del Ninja (also known as Angel Garza)
- Juventud Guerrera
- La Parka (also known as L.A. Park)
- La Sombra (also known as Andrade)
- Máscara Dorada (also known as Gran Metalik)
- Mascarita Dorada (also known as El Torito)
- Mil Máscaras
- Místico (also known as Sin Cara)
- Pentagón Jr.
- Rey Fénix
- Rush
- Super Crazy
- Titán

Among the Mexican female wrestlers who have excelled abroad are:

- Ayako Hamada
- Cynthia Moreno
- Esther Moreno
- Sexy Star
- Thunder Rosa
- Yulisa León

== See also ==
- History of professional wrestling
- List of professional wrestling attendance records in Mexico
- Professional wrestling promotions in Mexico
