= Rocky Romero =

American professional wrestler (born 1982)

- Romero in August 2026

Personal information
- Born: John Raymond Rivera; October 28, 1982 (age 44) Havana, Cuba

Professional wrestling career
- Ring name(s): Azteko; Black Emperor; Black Tiger (IV); Chico El Luchador; Grey Shadow; Havana Brother I El Mono Negro; Rocky Romero
- Billed height: 173 cm (5 ft 8 in)
- Billed weight: 80 kg (176 lb)
- Billed from: Havana, Cuba; Roppongi, Japan; Los Angeles, California
- Trained by: Kevin Quinn; Jesse Hernandez; Bill Anderson; Antonio Inoki; Shinya Makabe; Negro Casas
- Debut: September 13, 1997

John Raymond Rivera (born October 28, 1982), better known by his ring name Rocky Romero (ロッキー・ロメロ, Rokkī Romero), is a Cuban-born Puerto Rican-American professional wrestler. He is signed to New Japan Pro-Wrestling (NJPW) and All Elite Wrestling (AEW), where he is a member of the Don Callis Family and one-half of Roppongi Vice with Trent Beretta. Nicknamed "Azúcar" (Spanish: sugar), he is best known for his accomplishments as a tag team wrestler, and was one-half of the Havana Pitbulls, Forever Hooligans and Roppongi Vice, as well as a member of the Chaos stable until their disbandment in 2025. His tenure as the fourth incarnation of Black Tiger was also met with praise and recognition.

Rivera made his in-ring debut on September 13, 1997, and, over the years, he portrayed several different characters including luchador enmascarados (masked professional wrestlers) and has wrestled extensively in Mexico for both Consejo Mundial de Lucha Libre (CMLL) and Lucha Libre AAA World Wide (AAA). In the United States, he is known for his work with Ring of Honor (ROH) as a member of No Remorse Corps, and was one of the featured wrestlers for Lucha Libre USA.

As a singles wrestler, Romero won the CMLL World Super Lightweight Championship on three occasions, the NWA World Historic Welterweight Championship, the MLW World Middleweight Championship, the IWGP Junior Heavyweight Championship (as Black Tiger) and the NWA World Junior Heavyweight Championship. In the tag team division, he is a former three-time ROH World Tag Team Champion and a record eight-time IWGP Junior Heavyweight Tag Team Champion. Romero's wrestling style incorporates stiff shoot-style kicks and multiple arm-lock variations resembling mixed martial arts, competing in lucha libre style events in Mexico early in his career.

In addition to his work in the ring, behind the scenes Romero is considered one of the most influential figures in professional wrestling, working as a liaison between AEW, CMLL and NJPW, amongst many other behind-the-scenes duties. Through his work, Romero has helped forge strong ties between the three international promotions.

== Professional wrestling career ==
=== Early career (1997–2007) ===
Rivera made his wrestling debut in 1997, using the ring name Rocky Romero. He was trained by Antonio Inoki at the NJPW Dojo in Los Angeles. His career has taken him through promotions in the Southern California region to Mexico, where he competed successfully for Consejo Mundial de Lucha Libre (CMLL), the world's oldest wrestling promotion, and in Japan where he has worked most notably in New Japan Pro-Wrestling (NJPW), where he was chosen to become the fourth incarnation of Black Tiger, the villainous gaijin opponent of Tiger Mask (in this case Tiger Mask IV). On October 8, 2005, Romero, as Black Tiger, defeated Tiger Mask for the IWGP Junior Heavyweight Championship. After a four-month reign, Tiger Mask regained the title from his nemesis. Romero made his debut in Pro Wrestling Noah on March 4, 2007, against Mushiking Terry, casting into doubt the future of the Black Tiger persona. Romero would then tour with Noah and teamed with Atsushi Aoki in the Nippon TV Cup Jr. Heavyweight Tag League. He also made his debut for Inoki's new promotion, the Inoki Genome Federation (IGF), defeating El Blazer.

Romero, however, did compete as Black Tiger in August 2007 in Chikara to compete for the NWA World Junior Heavyweight Championship against champion Mike Quackenbush.

=== Consejo Mundial de Lucha Libre (2003–2004, 2008) ===
In late-2003, Romero began working for Consejo Mundial de Lucha Libre in Mexico, using the name "Havana Brother I", where he would team up with Havana Brother II and Havana Brother III to form a three-man team known as Los Havana Brothers. A few months later, Los Havana Brothers began working as Rocky Romero, Pinoy Boy and Bobby Quance respectively. On September 12, Romero became CMLL's first-ever World Super Lightweight Champion after defeating Volador Jr. in a tournament final. On November 14, Virus defeated Romero to win the championship, signaling the exit of Los Havana Brothers for the time being. In late 2004, Romero made a surprise return to CMLL and defeated Virus to regain the championship. After the title win, he left CMLL again, occasionally defending the championship in Southern California. In 2005, local wrestler Tommy Williams won the Super Lightweight Championship, but Romero regained it in January 2006. At that point the championship became inactive, with no mention of it.

In early 2008, Romero returned to CMLL and began working under the name "Grey Shadow", a masked gimmick, without CMLL openly acknowledging that it was Romero under the mask. No official references were given to his past with CMLL, nor any mention of the fact that Romero was a CMLL World Super Lightweight Champion.

=== Ring of Honor (2004–2005, 2007–2010) ===
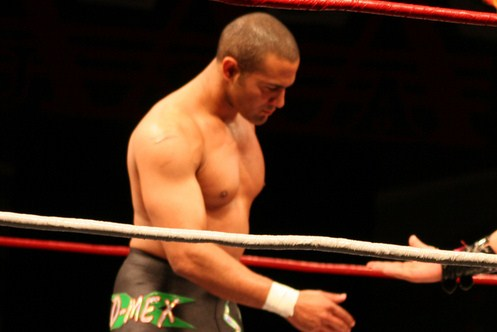
Romero in March 2009.

Romero's main exposure in the United States came in Ring of Honor (ROH) as one-half of the Havana Pitbulls tag team with Ricky Reyes; they were also members of Homicide's stable, The Rottweilers. Their first match was on April 23, 2004, losing to The Briscoes (Jay Briscoe and Mark Briscoe). On August 7, he and Reyes defeated CM Punk and Colt Cabana to win the ROH World Tag Team Championship. At Glory by Honor III on September 11, they successfully defended the titles in a four-way Ultimate Endurance match against B. J. Whitmer and Dan Maff, Jack Evans and Roderick Strong and Carnage Crew (DeVito and Loc). They lost the titles to Whitmer and Maff on February 19, 2005, ending their reign at 196 days; it was the longest tag title reign until it was eclipsed by Austin Aries and Strong later that year. He left the company at the end of 2005 to focus on working in Japan, with Romero unsuccessfully challenging Bryan Danielson for the ROH World Championship at Steel Cage Warfare in his final match at the time on December 5.

Romero returned at Dedication on January 26, 2007, ending his association with Homicide before defeating Davey Richards. The following evening, at Battle of the Icons, Romero walked out on Reyes in the midst of a match against the Briscoe Brothers. At Supercard of Honor II on March 31, Romero was introduced as the newest member of the No Remorse Corps, but he and new stablemate Richards lost to Evans and Naruki Doi. Throughout the year, they feuded with Delirious and The Resilience (Aries, Erick Stevens and Matt Cross), whom they defeated on May 11 at Reborn Again and Driven on June 23 (aired September 21). Their feud culminated on October 6 at Undeniable, with Romero and Richards defeating Stevens and Cross in a match where the losers had to leave ROH for 60 days.

Romero and Richards unsuccessfully challenged the Briscoe Brothers for the ROH World Tag Team Championship at Glory by Honor VI on November 2 and in a two-out-of-three falls match at Rising Above on November 29. They defeated Age of the Fall (Tyler Black and Jimmy Jacobs), Aries and Danielson and Brent Albright and Whitmer in an Ultimate Endurance match to capture the title on January 26, 2008, only to lose it to the Briscoe Brothers on April 12. After leaving ROH in mid-2008 to compete in Mexico, Romero returned on December 18, 2009, and defeated Alex Koslov the next night at Final Battle. Koslov won their rematch in Arizona on March 26, 2010, during WrestleMania weekend.

=== Lucha Libre AAA World Wide (2008–2010) ===
On October 5, 2008, Romero jumped from CMLL to rival promotion Lucha Libre AAA World Wide (AAA). He made his surprise debut at the promotion's television taping in Puebla, Puebla and was announced as a member of Sean Waltman's D-Generation MEX stable at the show. On July 4, 2010, Romero turned rudo and joined La Legión Extranjera instead. However, just four days later, it was reported that Romero had left AAA, after the company had asked him to take a pay cut.

=== New Japan Pro-Wrestling (2009, 2010–present) ===
At New Japan Pro Wrestling's Resolution '09 on April 5, Romero lost in a mask vs. title match against Tiger Mask, thus ending his role as Black Tiger.

==== No Remorse Corps (2010–2012) ====
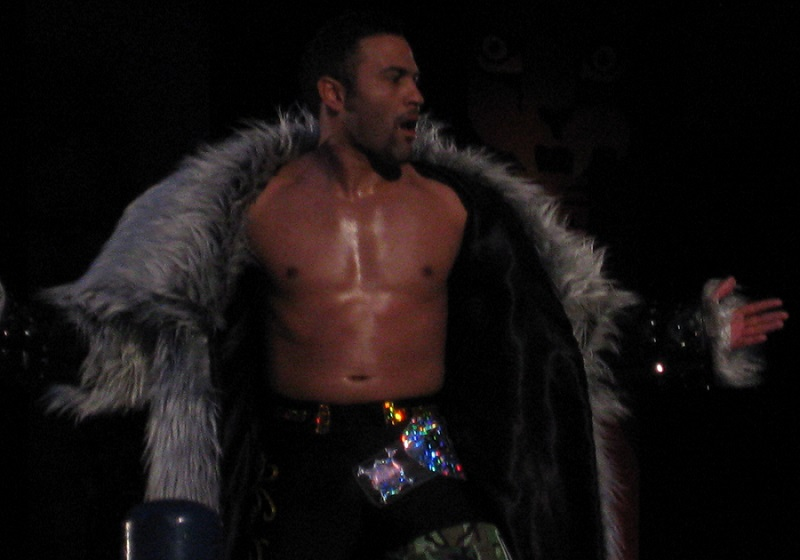
Romero in February 2012.

On October 12, 2010, NJPW announced that Romero would return to the promotion in November, teaming with No Remorse Corps partner Davey Richards in the Super J Tag League as a member of the promotion's top heel stable, Shinsuke Nakamura's Chaos. The five-day-long tournament ended on November 13, with Romero and Richards winning their block and advancing to the finals, where they were defeated by their Chaos team mates Jado and Gedo.

Romero and Richards unsuccessfully challenged Apollo 55 (Prince Devitt and Ryusuke Taguchi) for the IWGP Junior Heavyweight Tag Team Championship at Wrestling Dontaku 2011 on May 3, 2011, but won the title in a rematch at Destruction '11 on October 10. They made their first successful title defense against Kushida and Tiger Mask on November 12 at Power Struggle. On December 23, Romero unsuccessfully challenged Devitt for the IWGP Junior Heavyweight Championship. On January 4, 2012, at Wrestle Kingdom VI, Romero and Richards lost the IWGP Junior Heavyweight Tag Team Championship back to Apollo 55, but regained it on February 12 at The New Beginning. However, on May 2, they were stripped of the title after travel issues forced Richards to miss Wrestling Dontaku 2012 the following day, where the two were scheduled to defend the title against Jyushin Thunder Liger and Tiger Mask.

==== Forever Hooligans (2012–2015) ====
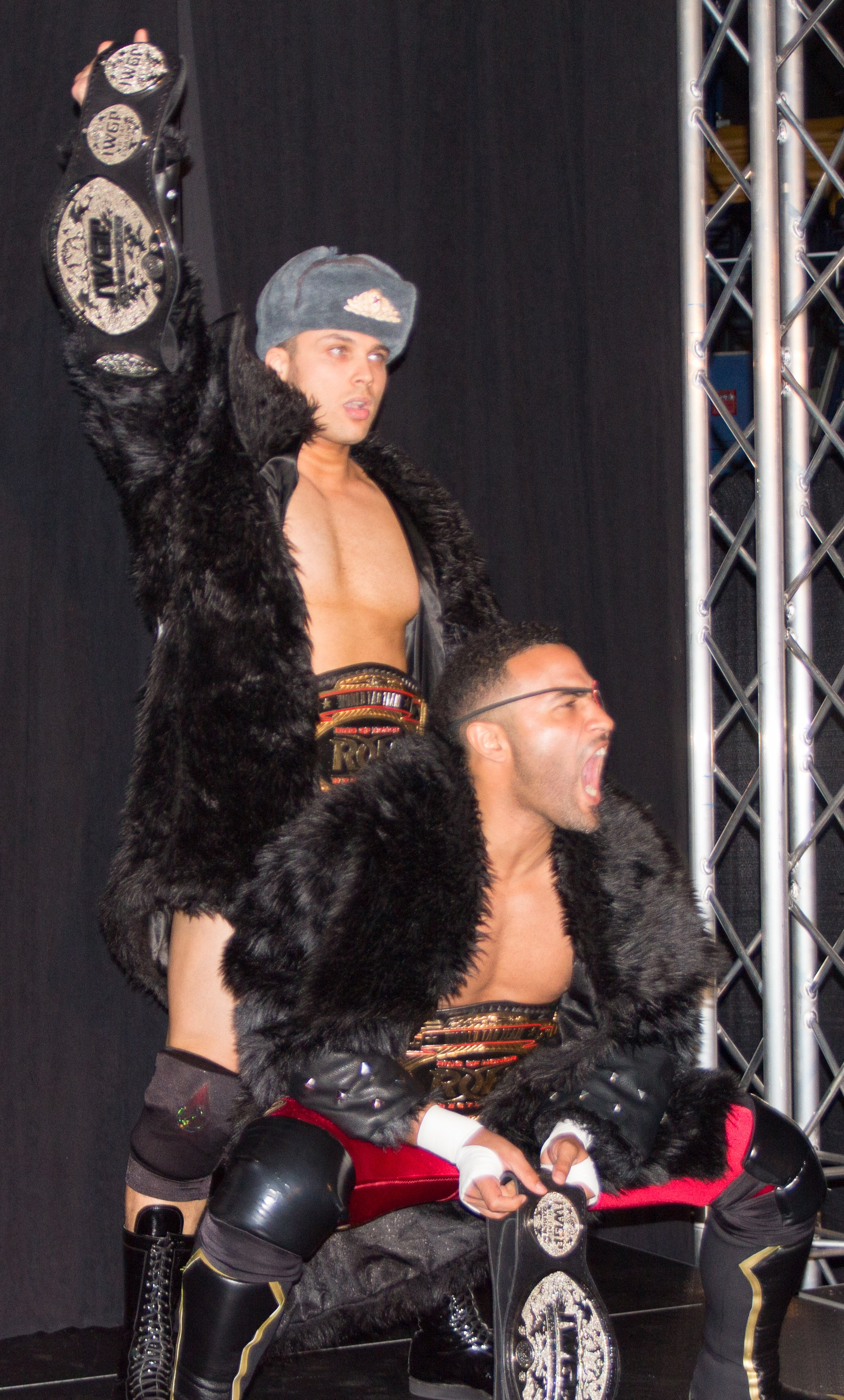
Forever Hooligans, Alex Koslov and Romero (right), with both the IWGP Junior Heavyweight Tag Team Championship and ROH World Tag Team Championship belts in 2013.

At Dominion 6.16 on June 16, Romero reunited with his former AAA partner Alex Koslov, teaming as "Forever Hooligans". On July 22, they defeated Liger and Tiger Mask to win the IWGP Junior Heavyweight Tag Team Championship. Forever Hooligans made their first successful title defense on August 26 at a Sacramento Wrestling Federation (SWF) event in Gridley, California, defeating A.J. Kirsch and Alex Shelley. They made their second successful title defense against the Time Splitters (Alex Shelley and Kushida) on October 8 at King of Pro-Wrestling. On October 21, Forever Hooligans entered the 2012 Super Jr. Tag Tournament, defeating Liger and Tiger Mask in their first round match. On November 2, Romero and Koslov were eliminated from the tournament in the semifinals by Apollo 55. On November 11 at Power Struggle, Forever Hooligans lost the title to the winners of the Super Jr. Tag Tournament, the Time Splitters, ending their reign at 112 days.

On May 3, 2013, at Wrestling Dontaku 2013, Romero and Koslov regained the IWGP Junior Heavyweight Tag Team Championship from the Time Splitters, but lost it to Suzuki-gun (Taichi and Taka Michinoku) on October 14 at King of Pro-Wrestling. For the first half of 2014, Forever Hooligans received several new shots at the title, held by The Young Bucks (Matt Jackson and Nick Jackson), but failed in their attempts at Wrestle Kingdom 8 on January 4 and Wrestling Dontaku 2014 on May 3.

==== Roppongi Vice (2015–2017) ====
Forever Hooligans broke up in January 2015, when Koslov announced he was taking an indefinite break from professional wrestling. On March 1, Romero revealed he and Trent Baretta were forming a new tag team named Roppongi Vice. On April 5 at Invasion Attack 2015, the team captured the IWGP Junior Heavyweight Tag Team Championship from The Young Bucks, only to lose it back to them on May 3 at Wrestling Dontaku 2015.

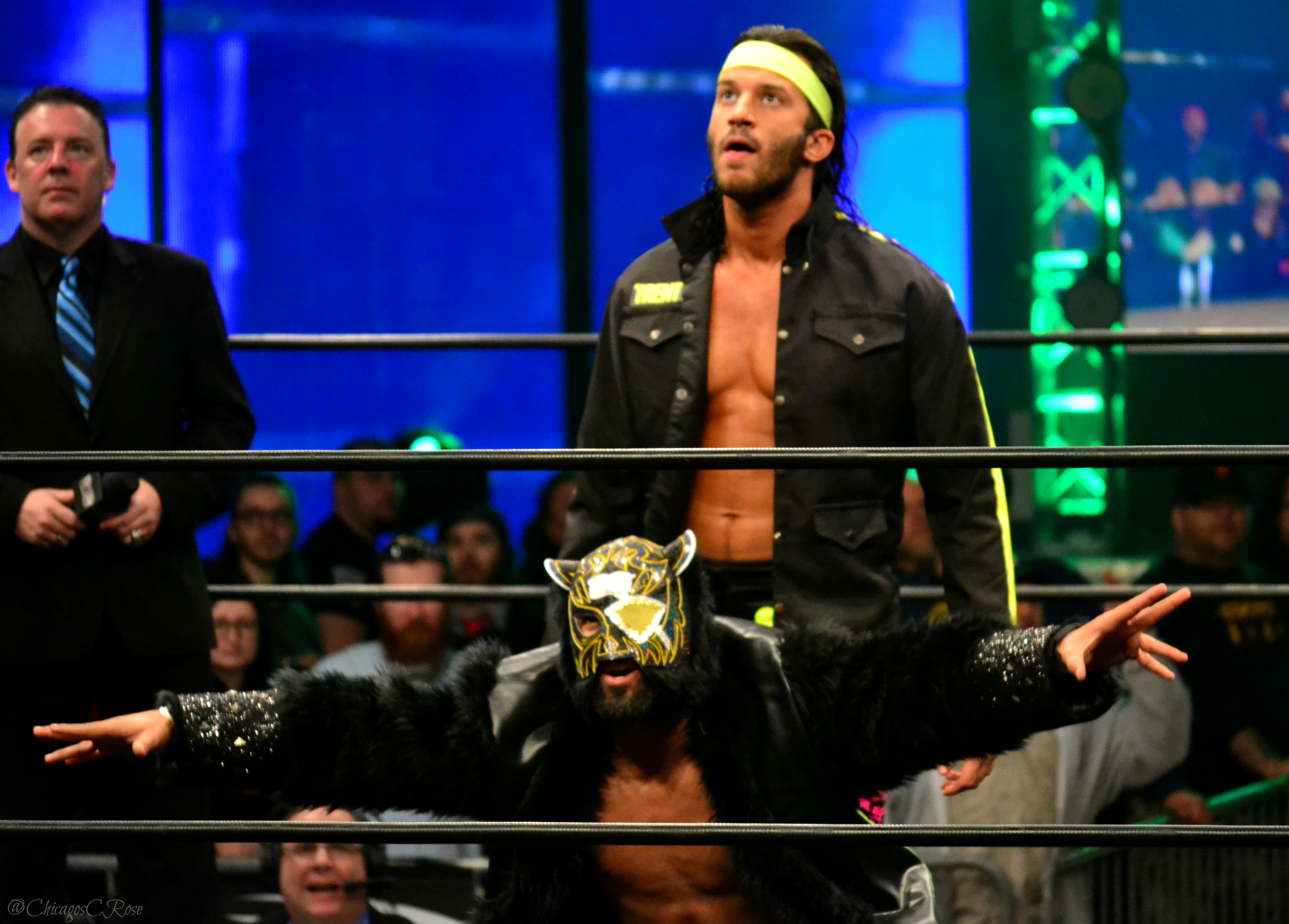
Roppongi Vice in February 2016 with Romero wearing a version of his Black Tiger mask.

In early 2016, it was reported that WWE was interested in signing Romero as both a trainer and a wrestler. However, on January 9, Romero announced he had instead signed a new two-year deal with NJPW. On April 10 at Invasion Attack 2016, Roppongi Vice defeated Matt Sydal and Ricochet to win the IWGP Junior Heavyweight Tag Team Championship for the second time, losing it in a rematch on May 3 at Wrestling Dontaku 2016. On November 5 at Power Struggle, Roppongi Vice defeated ACH and Taiji Ishimori in the finals to win the 2016 Super Jr. Tag Tournament. On January 4, 2017, at Wrestle Kingdom 11 in Tokyo Dome, Roppongi Vice defeated The Young Bucks to win the IWGP Junior Heavyweight Tag Team Championship for their third time together. Individually, Romero set a new record by winning the title for the seventh time. They lost the title to Suzuki-gun (Taichi and Yoshinobu Kanemaru) at NJPW's 45th anniversary show on March 6. After regaining the title on April 27, they lost it once more to The Young Bucks on June 11 at Dominion 6.11 in Osaka-jo Hall.

On July 2 at G1 Special in USA, Roppongi Vice unsuccessfully challenged The Young Bucks for the title in a rematch. Afterwards, Romero brought up a five-year plan he and Beretta had made three years earlier, which included them winning the IWGP Junior Heavyweight Tag Team Championship and the Super Jr. Tag Tournament, both of which they had already done, as well as Beretta's eventual transition into the heavyweight division. Having failed to regain the IWGP Junior Heavyweight Tag Team Championship, Romero gave Beretta his blessing to move to the heavyweight division, effectively disbanding Roppongi Vice. Roppongi Vice's farewell match took place on September 16 at Destruction in Hiroshima, where they defeated Bullet Club's Chase Owens and Yujiro Takahashi.

==== Manager of Roppongi 3K and sporadic appearances (2017–present) ====
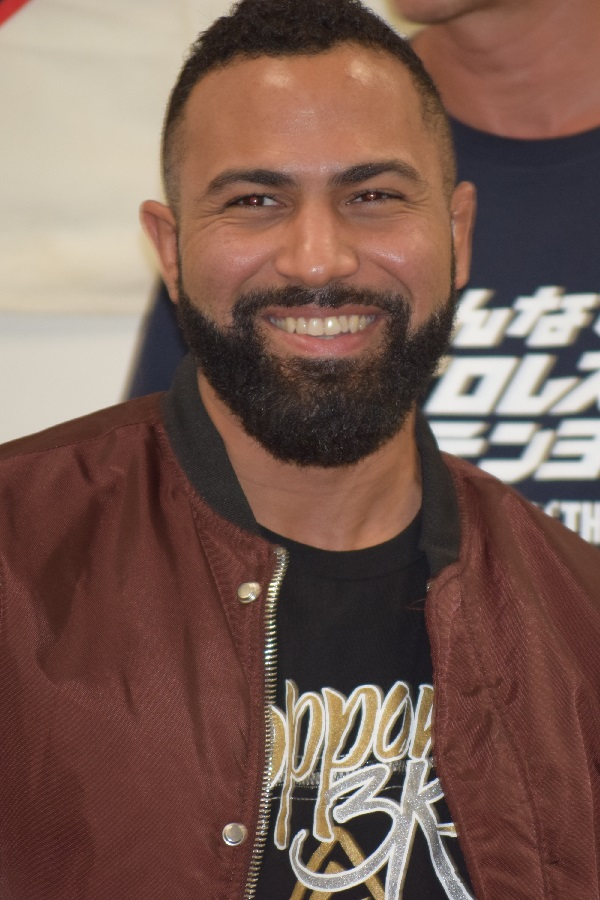
Romero, as manager of Roppongi 3K, at a press conference in 2017

Later that same day, Romero announced he was transitioning into the role of a manager and bringing in a new tag team named "Roppongi 3K" to take on the IWGP Junior Heavyweight Tag Team Champions Ricochet and Ryusuke Taguchi. On October 9 at King of Pro-Wrestling, Romero revealed his new team as Sho and Yoh, who defeated Ricochet and Taguchi to become the new IWGP Junior Heavyweight Tag Team Champions. Over the subsequent years, Romero managed Roppongi 3K to a second reign with the IWGP Junior Heavyweight Championship, as well as Sho and Yoh winning the 2018 Super Junior Tag Tournament. Romero also teamed up with Roppongi 3K for various multi-man matches while representing Chaos, for tours such as the CMLL/NJPW Fantastica Mania 2018 tour.)

Since 2022, Romero would mainly appear on the Strong brand of NJPW. In 2024, Romero would accompany his Don Callis Family stabelmate Konosuke Takeshita to his matches during the G1 Climax. On July 7, 2026, Romero, as Black Tiger IV, was defeated by Tiger Mask IV in Tiger Mask's retirement match.

=== Return to ROH (2013–2021) ===
Romero returned to Ring of Honor, through NJPW's close working relationship, at the ROH 11th Anniversary Show on March 2, 2013, where he and Alex Koslov lost to The American Wolves (Davey Richards and Eddie Edwards). On July 27, they defeated reDRagon (Bobby Fish and Kyle O'Reilly) to become the new ROH World Tag Team Champions. They lost the title to The American Wolves in their first defense at All-Star Extravaganza V on August 3. At Death Before Dishonor XI on September 20, the Forever Hooligans defeated the American Wolves in a rematch to retain the IWGP Junior Heavyweight Tag Team Championship. They unsuccessfully challenged The Young Bucks for the NJPW Junior Heavyweight Tag Team Championship in a three-way match, also involving the Time Splitters on May 10, 2014, at Global Wars, a special event co-produced by ROH and NJPW in Toronto.

At Death Before Dishonor XIII on July 24, 2015, Romero and Beretta lost to The Briscoes. On March 10, 2017, they failed to win the ROH World Tag Team Championship from Jeff and Matt Hardy in a three-way Street Fight also involving The Young Bucks at the ROH 15th Anniversary Show. On May 12, at ROH/NJPW War of the Worlds, Romero, Beretta and Hirooki Goto unsuccessfully challenged Bully Ray and The Briscoes in a no disqualification match for the ROH World Six-Man Tag Team Championship. On January 25, 2019, Romero earned a future shot at the ROH World Television Championship by defeating champion Jeff Cobb and Dalton Castle in a Proving Ground match, but lost his title match on February 10 at Bound By Honor. Romero made his final appearance at Final Battle on December 11, 2021, teaming with VLNCE UNLTD (Brody King, Homicide and Tony Deppen) to defeat EC3, Eli Isom, Taylor Rust and Tracy Williams.

=== All Elite Wrestling (2021–present) ===
On the May 24, 2021 episode of Dark: Elevation, as part of the on-going relationship between All Elite Wrestling (AEW) and New Japan Pro-Wrestling, Romero made his debut for the promotion defeating JD Drake. After the match, Romero briefly reunited with his former Roppongi Vice partner Trent Beretta, as he saved Romero from an attack by Ryan Nemeth, Peter Avalon and Cezar Bononi, before their theme music played and they embraced in the ring. Romero also wrestled a singles match against Bryan Danielson on the November 10, 2021 episode of Dynamite.

On the February 12, 2024 edition of Wrestling Observer Live, journalist Dave Meltzer reported that, Romero joined AEW's front office. However, the exact official role was not stated. At Grand Slam on September 25, Romero was officially inducted as a member of The Conglomeration. On the April 17, 2025 at the Spring BreakThru episode of Collision, Romero turned heel after betraying stablemate Tomohiro Ishii in a tag match and participated in attacking Ishii with the rest of the Don Callis Family, joining the group and reuniting Roppongi Vice with Trent Beretta.

=== Impact Wrestling (2021–2023) ===
On October 23, 2021, at Bound for Glory, Romero made an unannounced appearance as a participant in the Call Your Shot Gauntlet match, which he failed to win as he was eliminated by Rohit Raju. On the October 28 episode of Impact!, Romero failed to win the Impact X Division Championship from Trey Miguel. In 2022, Romero returned for a match against Eddie Edwards, which he failed to win. On March 30, 2023, at Multiverse United, Romero took on Miguel, Clark Connors, Frankie Kazarian, Kevin Knight and Rich Swann in a six-way Scramble match for the Impact X Division Championship, which saw Miguel retain the title.

=== Return to CMLL (2022–present) ===
On July 20, 2022, CMLL announced that Romero would return for the first time since 2008 to compete in that year's International Grand Prix. During the tournament on August 19, he eliminated Soberano Jr. before being eliminated by eventual winner Volador Jr., beginning a feud between the two. He and Místico defeated Lince Dorado and Volador Jr. on December 9 to win the Copa Bicentenario ("Bicentennial Cup"). On January 20, 2023, Romero defeated Volador Jr. to win the NWA World Historic Welterweight Championship. The following month, they were forced to team together for the Torneo Nacional de Parejas Increibles ("National Amazing Pairs Tournament"), defeating Ángel de Oro and Oraculo in the first round before losing to Averno and Místico in the semi-finals. In the main event of Homenaje a Dos Leyendas ("Homage to Two Legends") on March 17, Romero was pinned by Volador Jr. in a four-way hair vs. hair match, forcing him to have all of his hair shaved off. On April 7, he competed in that year's Universal Championship tournament, but lost to Atlantis Jr. in the three-way semi-finals also involving Místico. On May 19, Romero appeared to cost Volador Jr. his semi-final match for the La Copa Junior VIP ("The Junior VIP Cup"). At Fantastica Mania Mexico on June 30, he defeated Volador Jr. to retain the NWA World Historic Welterweight Championship.

The following month, Romero and Máscara Dorada outlasted Dragón Rojo Jr., Metalik, Místico, Templario, Titán and Volador Jr. in a torneo cibernetico to face each other in the finals of the Leyenda de Plata ("The Silver Legend") tournament on July 28, which Dorada won. At the CMLL 90th Anniversary Show on September 16, Romero, Kevin Knight and TJP lost to Atlantis Jr., Dorada and Místico. On December 15, Romero lost the title to Dorada. In early 2024, Romero and Dorada were paired for the Torneo Nacional de Parejas Increibles, defeating Ángel de Oro and Flip Gordon and Akuma and Dulce Gardenia en route to the finals at Homenaje a Dos Leyendas on March 29, where they defeated Atlantis Jr. and Soberano Jr. to win the tournament. At the CMLL 91st Anniversary Show on September 13, Romero, Orange Cassidy and Satoshi Kojima lost to Atlantis Jr., Último Guerrero and Volador Jr., who pinned Romero. On December 13, he unsuccessfully challenged Gordon for the NWA World Historic Welterweight Championship. At Homenaje a Dos Leyendas on March 21, 2025, Romero and Volador Jr. unsuccessfully challenged Ángel de Oro and Niebla Roja for the CMLL World Tag Team Championship.

== Behind the scenes ==
In addition to his in-ring career, Rocky Romero has played a key behind-the-scenes role in several major wrestling promotions, including New Japan Pro-Wrestling (NJPW), All Elite Wrestling (AEW) and Consejo Mundial de Lucha Libre (CMLL).

At NJPW, Romero has been involved in talent recruitment, contract negotiations, and expanding the promotion's presence in the United States. He has played a part in the development of NJPW Strong, the American wing of NJPW, where he has helped bring in talent and has worked towards securing broader distribution for the show, with hopes to extend its reach to cable television and additional streaming services. During the COVID-19 pandemic, he oversaw the creation of New Japan USA contracts, designed for U.S.-based wrestlers who were prominently featured on NJPW Strong, offering them a structured pathway into the NJPW system. Romero has also served as a liaison and booker for NJPW Strong, coordinating logistics and collaborating with wrestlers for potential collaborations on NJPW platforms. He has expressed plans to gradually shift away from in-ring competition in favor of administrative and developmental roles within NJPW, focusing on building partnerships and expanding the promotion's footprint in the United States.

In AEW, Romero has taken on an executive role, contributing to talent booking, contract negotiations, and strategic planning. He has coordinated production details and helped shape inter-promotional events, with a focus on blending talent from multiple promotions. Romero's efforts have strengthened AEW's connections with other wrestling organizations and broadened the company's reach.

Romero has also played an important role behind the scenes with CMLL, where he has acted as an intermediary between the American and Mexican wrestling markets. He has facilitated communication between AEW President Tony Khan and CMLL head Salvador Lutteroth III, helping to overcome cultural and business challenges. Romero's work has contributed to the inclusion of CMLL performers in inter-promotional events, enhancing their visibility in the United States.

== Personal life ==
Romero's father is a native of Rincón, Puerto Rico, while his mother is Nuyorican. He was introduced to wrestling by his grandmother, who would watch wrestling with him on the weekends while his parents worked.

== Championships and accomplishments ==
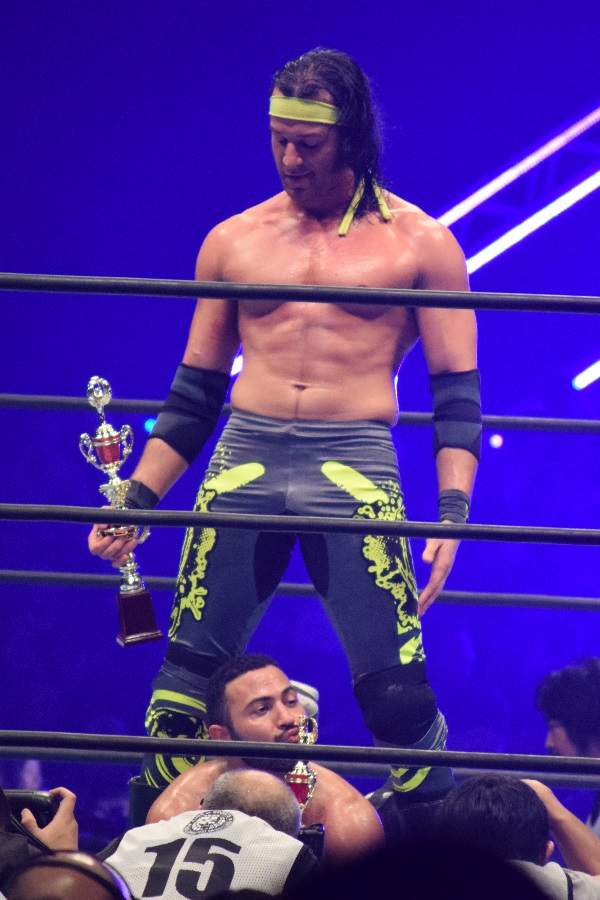
Roppongi Vice after winning the 2016 Super Jr. Tag Tournament.

- Championship Wrestling From Hollywood
  - UWN Television Championship (1 time)
  - Percy Pringle Memorial Cup (2016)
- Consejo Mundial de Lucha Libre
  - CMLL World Super Lightweight Championship (3 times, inaugural)
  - CMLL World Lightweight Championship Tournament (2003)
  - Copa Bicentenario (2022) – with Místico
  - NWA World Historic Welterweight Championship (1 time)
  - Torneo Nacional de Parejas Increibles (2024) - with Máscara Dorada
- Costa Rica Wrestling Embassy
  - CWE Heavyweight Championship (1 time)
- DDT Pro-Wrestling
  - Ironman Heavymetalweight Championship (2 times)
- Empire Wrestling Federation
  - EWF Tag Team Championship (5 times) – with Ricky Reyes
- International Wrestling Council
  - IWC Tag Team Championship (1 time)– with Ricky Reyes
- Lucha Libre Internacional Independiente
  - LLII Championship (1 time)
- Mach One Pro Wrestling
  - M1W The Hall Of Fame Cup (2011)
- Millennium Pro Wrestling
  - MPW Tag Team Championship (1 time) – with Ricky Reyes
- Major League Wrestling
  - MLW World Middleweight Championship (1 time)
- National Wrestling Alliance
  - NWA World Junior Heavyweight Championship (1 time)
- New Japan Pro-Wrestling
  - IWGP Junior Heavyweight Championship (1 time)
  - IWGP Junior Heavyweight Tag Team Championship (8 times) – with Davey Richards (2), Alex Koslov (2), and Beretta (4)
  - Best of the American Super Juniors (2006)
  - Super Jr. Tag Tournament (2016) – with Beretta
- Pro Wrestling Illustrated
  - Faction of the Year (2025) as part of the Don Callis Family
  - Ranked No. 11 of the top 500 singles wrestlers in the PWI 500 in 2002
- Ring of Honor
  - ROH World Tag Team Championship (3 times) – with Ricky Reyes (1), Davey Richards (1), and Alex Koslov (1)
  - Trios Tournament (2005) – with Ricky Reyes and Homicide
- SoCal Uncensored
  - Tag Team of the Year (2001) with Ricky Reyes
- Toryumon
  - Young Dragons Cup Tournament (2004)
- Ultimate Pro Wrestling
  - UPW Tag Team Championship (1 time) – with Ricky Reyes
- WrestleCircus
  - Big Top Tag Team Championship (1 time) – with Beretta
- Other titles
  - Talk 'N Shop A Mania 24/7 Championship (1 time)

== Luchas de Apuestas record ==
Winner (wager)	Loser (wager)	Location	Event	Date	Notes
Tiger Mask (IWGP Junior Heavyweight Championship)	Black Tiger (mask)	Tokyo, Japan	Resolution '09	April 5, 2009	
Volador Jr. (hair)	Rocky Romero (hair)	Mexico City, Mexico	Homenaje a Dos Leyendas (2023)	March 17, 2023	

== Mixed martial arts record ==
Res.	Record	Opponent	Method	Event	Date	Round	Time	Location	Notes
Loss	0-1	(Japan) Masahito Kakihara	Submission (kneebar)	JF 3 - Jungle Fight 3	October 23, 2004	1	0:20	Manaus, Brazil	

== Media ==
- Let the Gates of Hell Open: The Best of The Rottweilers – ROH DVD
