= List of professional wrestling promotions in Mexico =

This is a list of professional wrestling promotions in Mexico and lists both active and defunct professional wrestling promotions from the 1930s to the 2020s.

== List ==
Name	Location	Owner(s)	Years active	Website	Notes
Active
Alianza Universal De Lucha Libre	Tlalnepantla	Hector Guzman	1990–		
Consejo Mundial de Lucha Libre	Mexico City	Salvador Lutteroth III	1933–	Yes	Oldest active wrestling promotion in the world. Originally known as Empresa Mexicana de Lucha Libre from 1933 to 1991. Was a member of the National Wrestling Alliance until 1991.
Desastre Total Ultraviolento	Tulancingo	Crazy Boy	2007–	Yes	
Federacion Universal de Lucha Libre	Mexico City	Tinieblas Jr	2010–	Yes	
International Wrestling Revolution Group	Naucalpan de Juarez	Adolfo Moreno	1996–	Yes	
Lucha Libre AAA Worldwide	Mexico City	Filip 49% WWE 51%	1992–	Yes	
Lucha Libre Femenil	Monterrey	Luciano Alberto Garcia de Luna	2000–	Yes	
Nueva Generacion Xtrema	Monterrey	Unknown	2002–	Yes	Has featured former Extreme Championship Wrestling stars Sabu and The Sandman, as well as some others independent foreign stars like Supreme and Necro Butcher.
The Crash	Tijuana		2011–	Yes	
Total Ultra-Violent Disaster	Naucalpan		2002–	No	
Universal Wrestling Entertainment	Tlalnepantla	Hector Guzman	2008–	No	
Defunct
Extreme Air Wrestling			2009–2013	Yes	
Federacion Internacional de Lucha Libre	Monterrey	Carlos Elizondo	1989–2019	No	
International Wrestling League	Toluca	Unknown	2010–2014	Yes	Promotion founded under the name Independent Wrestling League. Name change in June 2011, Became Inactive in 2014.
Lucha Libre Elite	Mexico City	Ernesto Santillan; Carlo Colin	2014–2022	Yes	
NWA Mexico	Mexico City	Blue Demon, Jr. Daniel Aceves	2008–2013	Yes	Affiliated with the National Wrestling Alliance. Promotion became inactive in 2013
Nación Lucha Libre	Mexico City	Alberto El Patrón	2019–2020	Yes	
Los Perros Del Mal	Mexico City	Perro Aguayo, Jr.	2008–2014	No	Broke away from CMLL in 2008. Promotion became inactive in 2014
Promo Azteca		Konnan	1996–1998	No	Broke away from AAA in 1996. Starred numerous luchadores wrestling in World Championship Wrestling during the late-1990s.
Super X Grand Prix Championship Wrestling		Juventud Guerrera	2004–2013	Yes	
Toryumon Mexico	Naucalpan	Último Dragón	1997–2020	No	Hosted the Yamaha and Young Dragons Cups.
Universal Wrestling Association	Naucalpan	Francisco Flores; Benjamín Mora, Sr. Benjamín Mora, Jr. Carlos Maynes	1974–1995	No	Also called Lucha Libre Internacional. Associated with New Japan Pro-Wrestling since 1979, and the World Wrestling Federation between 1979 and 1985.
World Wrestling Association	Tijuana	Benjamín Mora, Jr.	1986–2014	No	
Xtreme Latin American Wrestling	Mexico City	Ernesto Ocampo	2001–2013	No	Has featured former Extreme Championship Wrestling stars Sabu and The Sandman.

== See also ==
- List of professional wrestling promotions
- List of women's wrestling promotions
