= Havana Pitbulls =

Professional wrestling tag team

Tag team
- Members: Ricky Reyes; Rocky Romero
- Name(s): Los Cubanitos; Havana Pitbulls
- Billed heights: Ricky Reyes: 5 ft 9 in (1.75 m); Rocky Romero: 5 ft 7 in (1.70 m)
- Combined billed weight: 367 lb (166 kg; 26.2 st)
- Billed from: Havana, Cuba
- Debut: 1999

The Havana Pitbulls was a professional wrestling tag team, consisting of Rocky Romero and Ricky Reyes, who worked for Ring of Honor as a member of The Rottweilers. They also worked for Pro Wrestling Guerrilla, Empire Wrestling Federation, Ultimate Pro Wrestling, and Liberty States Wrestling.

== History ==
=== Independent circuit ===
In September 1999, Romero and Reyes—using the tag team name Los Cubanitos—were awarded Empire Wrestling Federation (EWF)'s Tag Team Championship. They were later stripped of the title on December 4, 1999.

Meanwhile, in the Ultimate Pro Wrestling promotion in April 2000, Los Cubanitos won the Tag Team title from Jobbers-R-Us, holding it for approximately one month before losing it to The Ballard Brothers.

On April 29, 2001, they won the EWF Tag Team Championship from Aggravated Assault, whom they traded the title with once between April 2001 and February 2002. Los Cubanitos, however, were stripped of the title on July 1, 2002 for injuring their opponents. In September 2003, they won the title (under their new name The Havana Pitbulls) for a fourth time by defeating Los Chivos. They held the title until January 2004, when they were defeated by The West Coast Ryders. They won the title for the fifth and final time in April 2005, once again defeating Los Chivos. They, however, were stripped of the title on May 25.

=== Ring of Honor ===
After several unsuccessful attempts at winning the Ring of Honor (ROH)'s World Tag Team Championship, on August 7, 2004, at ROH Testing the Limits, the Havana Pitbulls (with Julius Smokes) defeated Colt Cabana and CM Punk for the title.

After several successful defenses, the Havana Pitbulls lost the ROH World Tag Team Championship to Dan Maff and B. J. Whitmer on February 19, 2005, at ROH 3rd Anniversary Part One. Also that year, they won the 2005 Trios Tournament with Homicide.

In 2007 the Havana Pitbulls had a brief reunion, ending on January 27, 2007 when Romero walked out on Reyes during a match against The Briscoe Brothers at ROH Battle of the Icons.

== Championships and accomplishments ==
- Empire Wrestling Federation

- EWF Tag Team Championship (5 times)

- Ring of Honor

- ROH Tag Team Championship (1 time)
- Trios Tournament (2005) - with Homicide

- SoCal Uncensored
  - Tag Team of the Year (2001)
- Ultimate Pro Wrestling

- UPW Tag Team Championship (1 time)

== Media ==
- Let the Gates of Hell Open: The Best of The Rottweilers – ROH DVD.
