= History of professional wrestling =

The modern history of professional wrestling can be traced to the late 19th century, evolving from 19th-century catch wrestling and from exhibition bouts featured in funfairs and variety strongman acts, many of which were known to have predetermined outcomes.

Professional wrestling is a popular form of entertainment in the Americas, Europe, Australia, Japan and India. Wrestling as a modern sport developed in the 19th century out of traditions of folk wrestling, emerging in the form of two styles of regulated competitive sport, "freestyle" and "Greco-Roman" wrestling (based on British and continental tradition, respectively), summarized under the term "amateur wrestling" by the beginning of the modern Olympics in 1896. The separation of "worked", i.e. purely performative, choreographed wrestling ("admitted fakery" or "kayfabe") from the competitive sport was completed in the 1920s.

Its popularity declined during World War II, but was revived in the late 1940s to 1960s, the First Golden Age of professional wrestling in the United States, during which Gorgeous George gained mainstream popularity. In Mexico and Japan, the 1940s–1960s was also a Golden Age for professional wrestling, with El Santo becoming a Mexican folk hero, and Rikidōzan achieving similar fame in Japan.

There was a marked decline in public interest in the 1970s and early 1980s, but with the advent of cable television in the mid 1980s there followed a Second Golden Age as the United States experienced a professional wrestling boom, with stars such as Hulk Hogan, André the Giant, "Macho Man" Randy Savage, Ric Flair, and "Rowdy" Roddy Piper. The nature of professional wrestling was changed dramatically to better fit television, enhancing character traits and storylines. Television has also helped many wrestlers break into mainstream media, becoming influential celebrities and icons of popular culture. Wrestling's popularity boomed when independent enthusiasts unified and their media outlets grew in number, and became an international phenomenon in the 1980s with the expansion of the World Wrestling Federation (WWF, now known as World Wrestling Entertainment, shortened to simply WWE).

In the Third Golden Age, from the mid-1990s to early 2000s, during the Monday Night War, professional wrestling achieved highs in both viewership and financial success during a time of fierce competition among competing promotions, namely WWF (then in its "Attitude Era") versus World Championship Wrestling (WCW), with Extreme Championship Wrestling (ECW) also playing a major role.

After the end of the Monday Night War, there was another decline in the popularity of professional wrestling; Japanese broadcasters largely relegated Pro Wrestling Noah's Power Hour and New Japan Pro-Wrestling's World Pro Wrestling to the midnight hours, and WWE's television programs saw relatively lower ratings, despite reporting record-high yearly earnings in 2018 and a modest spike in interest and viewership in 2019. This paralleled a renewed interest in competitive combat sports with the rise of mixed martial arts.

In the early 2020s, WWE experienced a major resurgence of popularity and mainstream awareness, with WWE performers dubbing the period as the "Renaissance Era". WWE established itself as the leader of sports-oriented content on digital-viewership platforms, most notably on YouTube, where it commands the highest number of channel subscribers and video views for a sports channel. All Elite Wrestling (AEW) also emerged as a major promotion of the Renaissance Era, having defeated WWE's NXT program in competition for Nielsen ratings during the Wednesday Night Wars.

== Origin ==
A tradition of combining wrestling and showmanship may originate in the early 1800s in Western Europe, Britain, and Ireland, when showmen presented wrestlers under names such as ""Herculean" Flower" and "Edward, the steel eater", "Gustave d'Avignon, the bone wrecker", or "Bonnet, the ox of the low Alps" and would wrestle one another and challenge members of the public to attempt to knock them down or wrestle them for money.

In 1830, French showman, Jean Exbroyat formed the first modern wrestlers' circus troupe and established a rule not to execute holds below the waist — a style he named "flat hand wrestling". This new style soon spread to the rest of Europe, the Austro-Hungarian Empire, Italy, Denmark and Russia under the names of Greco-Roman wrestling, Classic wrestling or French wrestling. By the end of the 19th century, this modern "Greco-Roman" wrestling style went on to become the most fashionable sport in Europe, and in 1898 the Frenchman Paul Pons, "the Colossus" became the first Professional World Champion.

The modern style of professional wrestling, popularized by the United States and United Kingdom during the late 19th century, is called the catch-as-catch can style. Originally thought of as unorthodox and more lax in style, catch wrestling differs from Greco-Roman in its allowed grapples; Greco-Roman strictly prohibits grabbing below the waist, while catch wrestling allows holds above and below the waist, including leg grips. Both catch wrestling and Greco-Roman were popular, and fully competitive, amateur and professional sports. But, from the late 19th century onwards, a sub-section of catch wrestling changed slowly into the choreographed sport entertainment now known as "professional wrestling", recognized as much for its theatrical antics and entertainment as wrestling ability.

At the turn of the 20th century, wrestling was introduced to the public as part of a variety act to spice up the limited action involved in the bodybuilder strongman attractions. One of its earliest stars was a Cornish-American ex-miner named Jack Carkeek, who would challenge audience members to last 10 minutes with him. The development of wrestling within the UK brought legitimate Greco-Roman grappler Georg Hackenschmidt to the country, where he would quickly associate himself with promoter and entrepreneur Charles B. Cochran. Cochran took Hackenschmidt under his wing and booked him into a match in which Hackenschmidt defeated another top British wrestler, Tom Cannon, for the European Greco-Roman title. This gave Hackenschmidt a credible claim to the world title, cemented in 1905 with a win over American Heavyweight Champion Tom Jenkins in the United States. Hackenschmidt took a series of bookings in Manchester for a then impressive £150 a week. Noting Hackenschmidt's legitimately dominant style of wrestling threatened to kill crowd interest, Cochran persuaded Hackenschmidt to learn showmanship from Cannon and wrestle many of his matches for entertainment rather than sport; this displayed the future elements of sports entertainment. Numerous big name stars, both beloved babyfaces and hated heels, came and went during the early inception of wrestling within the UK, with many, like Hackenschmidt, leaving for the US. The resulting loss of big name stars sent the business into decline before the outbreak of World War I in 1914 halted it completely.

The World Heavyweight Wrestling Championship was the first recognized professional wrestling world heavyweight championship created in 1905 to identify the best catch wrestler in the world. It was also the first wrestling championship known to have a physical representation of the belt. Russian-born George Hackenschmidt won the inaugural championship defeating American-born Tom Jenkins in New York City.

Wrestling's popularity experienced a dramatic tailspin in 1915 to 1920, becoming distanced from the American public because of widespread doubt of its legitimacy and status as a competitive sport. Wrestlers during the time recount it as largely faked by the 1880s. It also waned due to Frank Gotch's retirement in 1913, and no new wrestling superstar emerging to captivate the public's eye. In response, three professional wrestlers, Ed Lewis, Billy Sandow, and Toots Mondt, joined to form their own promotion in the 1920s, modifying their in-ring product to attract fans. The three were referred to as the "Gold Dust Trio" due to their financial success. Their promotion was the first to use time-limit matches, "flashy" new holds, and signature maneuvers. They also popularized tag team wrestling, introducing new tactics such as distracting the referee, to make the matches more exciting. Rather than paying traveling wrestlers to perform on certain dates and combining wrestlers in match-ups when they were available, they decided to keep wrestlers for months and years at a time, allowing long-term angles and feuds to develop.

In the late 1920s, the success of the more worked aspects of professional wrestling in America, like gimmickry and submission holds, were introduced to British wrestling. Amateur wrestler Sir Atholl Oakeley got together with fellow grappler Henry Irslinger to launch one of the first promotions to employ the new style of wrestling, named "All-in" wrestling. The great demand for wrestling meant there were not enough skilled amateurs to go around, and many promoters switched to more violent styles, with weapons and chairshots as part of the proceedings. Women wrestlers and mud-filled rings also became commonplace. In the late 1930s the London County Council banned professional wrestling, leaving the business in rough shape just before World War II.

== History by country ==
=== Australia ===
Professional wrestling in Australia first gained distinction in the early 20th century, however there were very few shows promoted. Nonetheless, there were stars such as Clarence Weber, Jack Carkeek, Clarence Whistler, and Georg Hackenschmidt. As time went on, the sport's popularity began to grow, particularly in the 1930s as people sought to find relief from the Great Depression. Throughout the 1940s professional wrestling suffered due to World War II but in the 1950s reached new highs as many stars from overseas were imported and attracted larger crowds and therefore expanded the market. Established names such as Lou Thesz, Dr. Jerry Graham and Gorgeous George toured the country during the decade.

Throughout the 1960s and 1970s, Australia established its only major promotion in WCW Australia. WCW had a television deal with the Nine Network, the first in Australia to do so, and attracted crowds between 2,000 and 9,000 people on a weekly basis. International stars such as Alex Iakovidis, Killer Kowalski, Ray Stevens, Dominic DeNucci, Mario Milano, Spiros Arion, Karl Gotch, Bruno Sammartino, Gorilla Monsoon and local stars Ron Miller and Larry O'Dea were all involved with the promotion which grew steadily through the 1960s and was a well-known product in the 1970s. However, with the introduction of World Series Cricket, WCW was left with no television deal and was forced to close down in 1978. This sent the Australian market into a large decline. With no access to any product anywhere in the world, the Australian market was almost dead until then World Wrestling Federation became a prominent figure in professional wrestling in the mid-1980s.

Australia has depended on the North American product since 1985. Hosting tours in 1985 and 1986 kept a solid viewing in the sport through programs such as Superstars of Wrestling and Saturday Night's Main Event. Small local promotions, as well as internationally publicized organizations and tours such as World Wrestling All-Stars and Hulkamania: Let The Battle Begin, have tried to take advantage of the popularity of professional wrestling in more recent times, but there has been nothing of note since the demise of World Championship Wrestling in 1978.

=== Japan ===
The dominant styles of Japanese professional wrestling were set in place by the two dominant promotions in Japan. New Japan Pro-Wrestling, headed by Antonio Inoki, used Inoki's "strong style" approach of wrestling as a simulated combat sport. Wrestlers incorporated kicks and strikes from martial arts disciplines, and a strong emphasis was placed on submission wrestling. All Japan Pro Wrestling, under the direction of Shohei Baba, used a style referred to as "King's Road". The "King's Road" style was in large part derived from American wrestling, particularly the style of top wrestlers in the National Wrestling Alliance, such as Dory Funk, Jr., Terry Funk, and Harley Race, all of whom wrestled for Baba in Japan. As such, "King's Road" placed a heavy emphasis on working of holds, brawling, and the storytelling elements of professional wrestling. Throughout the 1990s, three individual styles — shoot style, lucha libre, and hardcore — were the main divisions of independent promotions, but as a result of the "borderless" trend of the first decade of the 21st century to have interpromotional matches, the line between rules among major-league promotions and independents has for the most part been blurred to standardization.

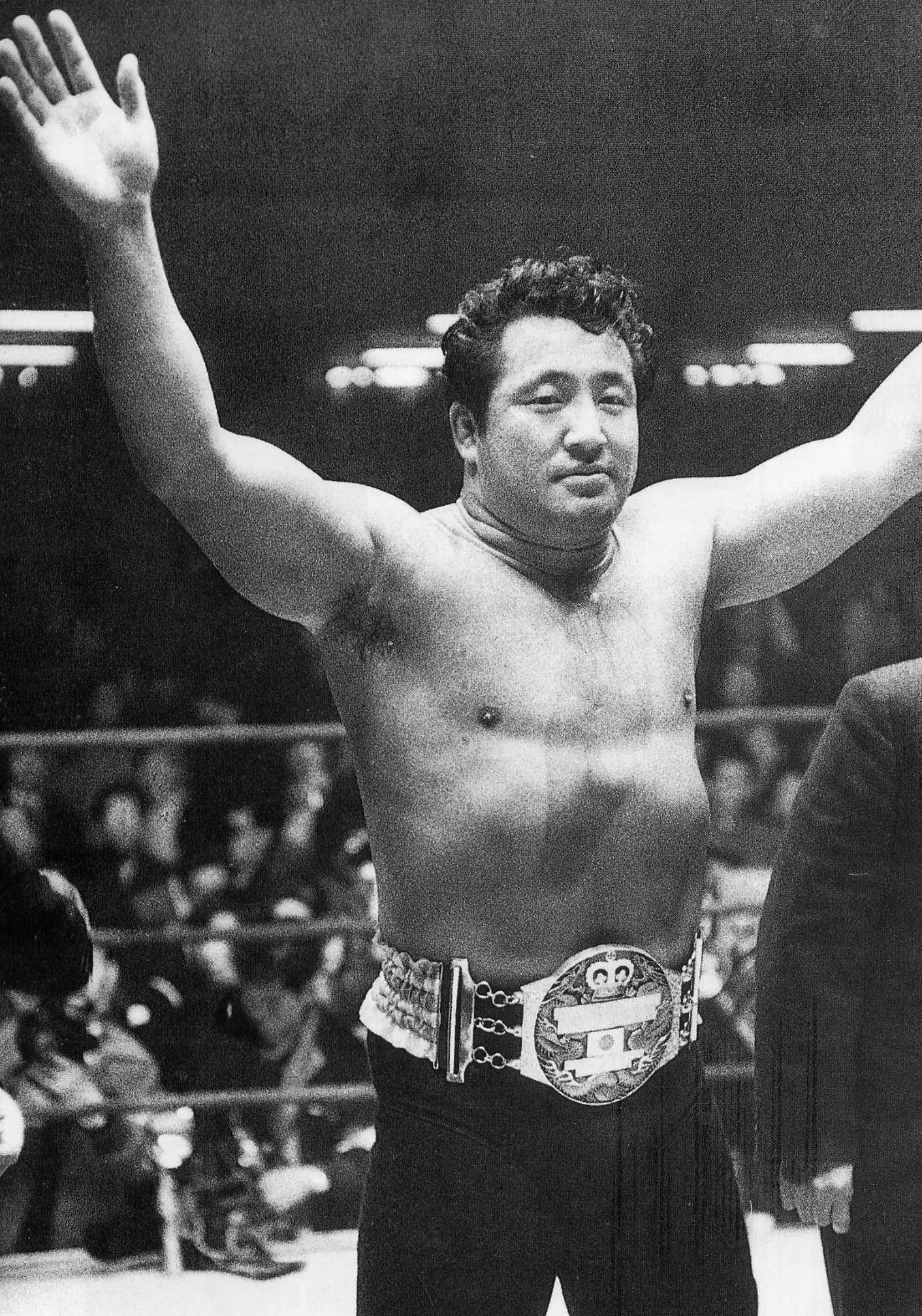
Rikidōzan was a huge star in Japan in the 1950s, and he is commonly credited with bringing professional wrestling to Japan

Puroresu done by female wrestlers is called joshi puroresu. Female wrestling in Japan is usually handled by promotions that specialize in joshi puroresu, rather than divisions of otherwise male-dominated promotions as is the case in the United States (the only exception was FMW, a men's promotion which had a small women's division, but even then depended on talent from women's federations to provide competition). However, joshi puroresu promotions usually have agreements with male puroresu promotions such that they recognize each other's titles as legitimate, and may share cards. All Japan Women's Pro-Wrestling was the dominant joshi organization from the 1970s to the 1990s. AJW's first major star was Mach Fumiake in 1974, followed in 1975 by Jackie Sato and Maki Ueda, known as The Beauty Pair. The early 1980s saw the fame of Jaguar Yokota and Devil Masami. That decade would later see the rise of Chigusa Nagayo and Lioness Asuka, known as The Crush Gals, who as a tag team achieved a level of unprecedented mainstream success in Japan, unheard of by any female wrestler in the history of professional wrestling anywhere in the world. Their long running feud with Dump Matsumoto and her Gokuaku Domei (loose translation: "Atrocious Alliance") stable would become extremely popular in Japan during the 1980s, with their televised matches resulting in some of the highest rated in Japanese television as well as the promotion regularly selling out arenas.

Since its beginning, Japanese professional wrestling depended on television to reach a wide audience. Rikidōzan's matches in the 1950s, televised by Nippon TV, often attracted huge crowds to Tokyo giant screens. Eventually TV Asahi also gained the right to broadcast JWA, but eventually the two major broadcasters agreed to split the talent, centering around Rikidōzan's top two students: NTV for Giant Baba and his group, and Asahi for Antonio Inoki and his group. This arrangement continued after the JWA split into today's major promotions, New Japan and All Japan, led by Inoki and Baba respectively. In 2000, following the Pro Wrestling Noah split, NTV decided to follow the new venture rather than staying with All Japan. Nowadays, however, mirroring the decline that professional wrestling in the U.S. had in the 1970s and early 1980s, NOAH's Power Hour and New Japan's World Pro Wrestling have been largely relegated to the midnight hours by their broadcasters. The advent of cable television and pay-per-view also enabled independents such as RINGS to rise. The television network WOWOW had a working agreement with Akira Maeda that paid millions to RINGS when he was featured, but eventually was scrapped with Maeda's retirement and the subsequent RINGS collapse.

Since its establishment professional wrestling in Japan has depended on foreigners, particularly North Americans, to get its own stars over. As a result of the introduction of lucha libre into Japan, major Mexican stars also compete in Japan. The most popular Mexican wrestler to compete in Japan is Mil Máscaras, who is credited with introducing the high-flying moves of lucha libre to Japanese audiences.

=== Russia ===
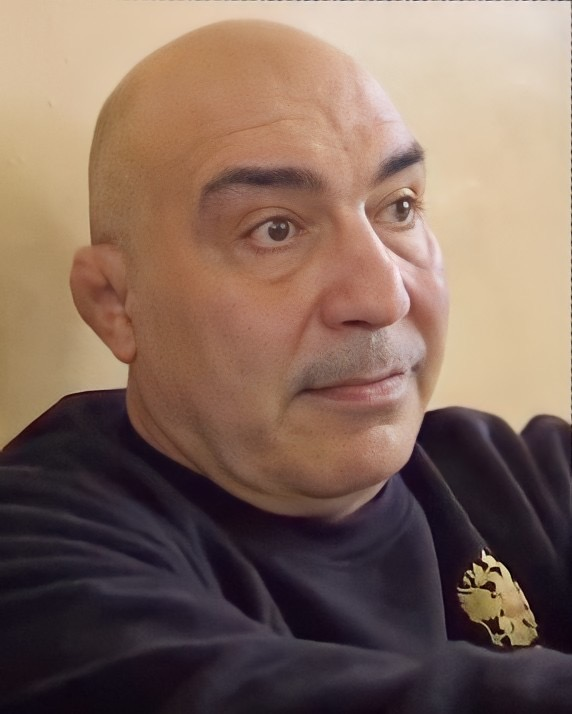
Victor Zangiev was one of the first Russians to fight outside his native country.

Wrestling appeared in the programs of circuses in the Russian Empire in the 1880s. By 1905 it strongly resembled modern professional wrestling its rules, customs, and manners. One of the most prominent promoters was "Uncle Vanya" Ivan Lebedev, who entertained the audience, announced the wrestlers' exits and developed a number of characters. There were "beasts" and "noble beauties". In the competitions were staged performances, which played on human feelings, capable of touching the heart of the then viewer. To arouse interest resorted to various tricks: started arguments in front of an audience, threatened each other with violence, hid behind the cheek swim bladder with red paint, which then poured faces.

Most of the circus competitions were staged. According to Ivan Poddubny's recollections, there was the following hierarchy: "At the highest level of the wrestling hierarchy were "technicals", or, as they were also called, "pirouettes" — wrestlers who had a perfect command of wrestling techniques. Below them stood "loggers". And on the lowest step were wrestlers, who were contemptuously called "padding", those who by order of the director of the championship lost by pinfall".

After the revolution, the interest in "French wrestling" faded in Russia. Interest in wrestling in Russia returned in the 1980s, when the Soviet Union began to host performances by international stars. In the 1990s professional wrestling matches were sometimes shown on cable TV or sold on VHS. In the late 1990s-early 2000s wrestling has become more widespread on national television.

In 2002, first wrestling federations appeared in Russia. In November 2002, in Moscow, the Independent Federation of Wrestling held its first championship. Since 2003, the IWF hosts a monthly show, "Danger Zone", since 2005, a special annual show "Wrestleada" with the participation of foreign wrestlers, and the "President's Cup" with mass elimination matches. Since 2010, there has also been an annual show, "King of Hardcore". From September to December 2006 an abridged version of the show "Danger Zone" was broadcast on the television channel 7TV. From May 2007 until the end of 2007 the show "Russian Extreme" aired on TV. After that, it ran from May 2008 to mid-2010 on 7TV.

=== Mexico ===
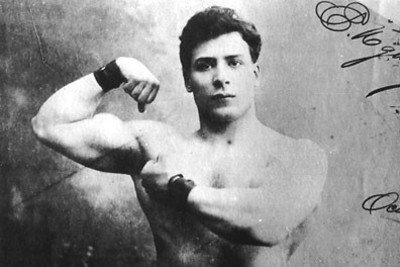
Enrique Ugartechea, a pioneer of professional wrestling in Mexico.

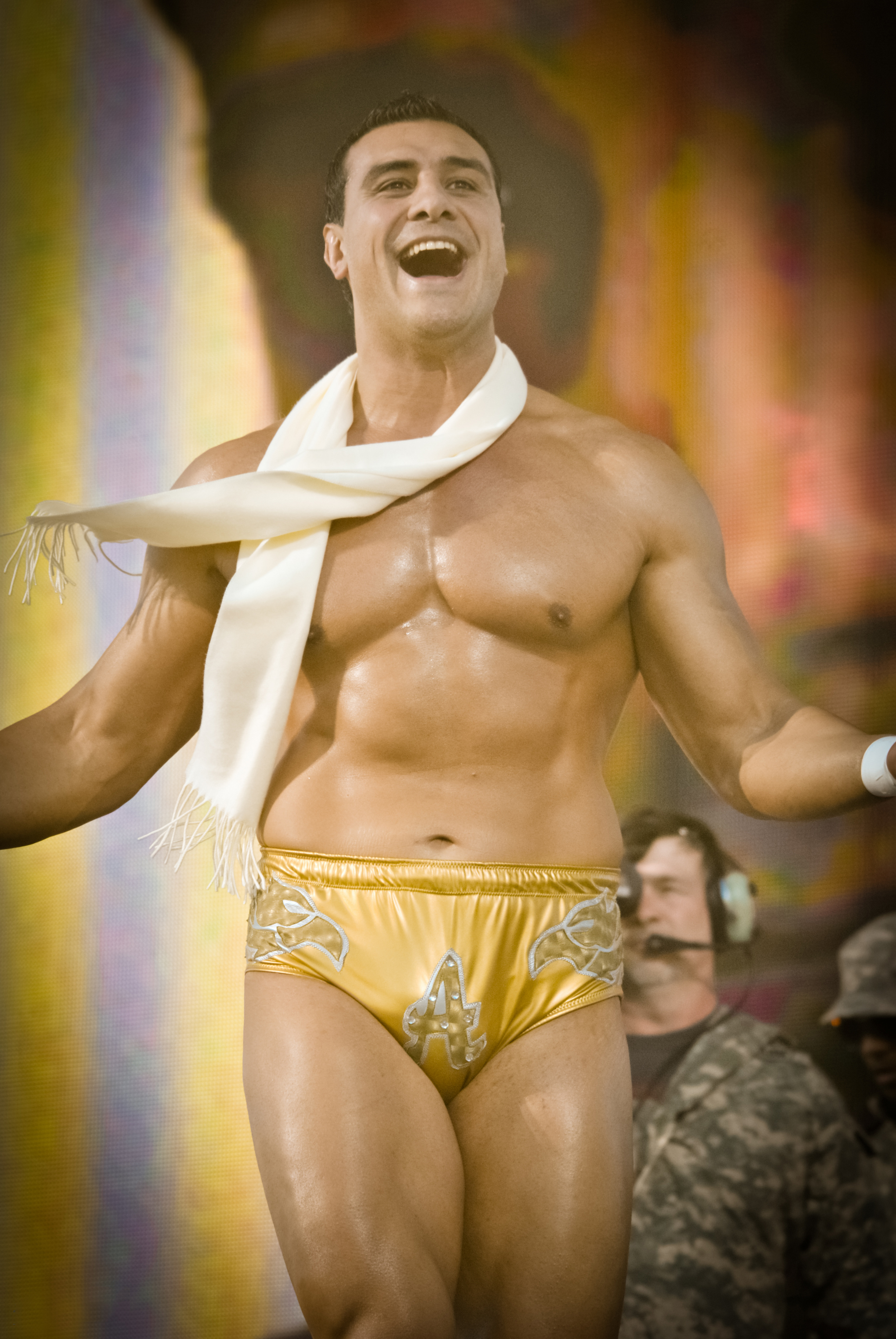
Prior to his arrival at WWE, Alberto Del Rio had achieved success at the Consejo Mundial de Lucha Libre (CMLL) in his country.

The origins of professional wrestling in Mexico date back to the 19th century with the introduction of Greco-Roman wrestling by French soldiers during the Second Franco-Mexican War. The first widely recognized Mexican wrestler was Enrique Ugartechea in 1863, who was known as the strongest man in the country, which caught the attention of brands like Spalding who sponsored him.

In the early 20th century, professional wrestling was mostly a regional phenomenon in Mexico until Salvador Lutteroth founded the Empresa Mexicana de Lucha Libre ("Mexican Wrestling Enterprise") in 1933, giving the sport a national foothold for the first time. The promotion company flourished and quickly became the premier spot for wrestlers. As television surfaced as a viable entertainment medium during the 1950s, Lutteroth was then able to broadcast his wrestling across the nation, subsequently yielding a popularity explosion for the sport. Moreover, it was the emergence of television that allowed Lutteroth to promote Mexican wrestling's first breakout superstar into a national pop-culture phenomenon. El Santo ("The Saint"), Blue Demon, and Mil Máscaras ("Man of a Thousand Masks") – collectively dubbed the Tres Grandes ("Big Three") of the Mexican wrestling tradition – emerged as three of the biggest EMLL stars.

As an alternative to CMLL, Lucha Libre AAA Worldwide (AAA) was founded in 1992 by Antonio Peña, who had previously worked for CMLL as a booker. Throughout the rest of the decade, AAA's popularity grew, collaborating with both World Championship Wrestling (WCW) in 1994 and the World Wrestling Federation (WWF, later WWE) in 1997; with the former, it co-hosted the When Worlds Collide event, and with the latter, it co-hosted the Royal Rumble event.

Professional wrestling in Mexico has developed a distinct style and presentation known as "lucha libre", which is characterized by its colorful wrestling masks, rapid sequences of holds and maneuvers, spectacular high-flying techniques, and telenovela-inspired sports entertainment elements. Mexican wrestlers are traditionally more agile and perform more aerial maneuvers than Anglo-Saxons wrestlers who, more often, rely on power moves and strikes to subdue their opponents. The difference in styles is due to the independent evolution of the sport in Mexico beginning in the 1930s and the fact that wrestlers in the cruiserweight division (peso semicompleto) are often the most popular. Execute high flying moves characteristic of lucha libre by utilizing the wrestling ring's ropes to catapult themselves towards their opponents, using intricate combinations in rapid-fire succession, and applying complex submission holds. Wrestling mask have been used dating back to the beginnings of Mexican wrestling promotions. Virtually all wrestlers in Mexico would start their careers wearing masks, but over the span of their careers a large number of them would be unmasked. Sometimes, a wrestler slated for retirement would be unmasked in his final bout or at the beginning of a final tour, signifying loss of identity as that character. The mask is considered "sacred" to a degree, so much so that fully removing an opponent's mask during a match is grounds for disqualification.

In the 2010s and 2020s, AAA and CMLL began airing their events on streaming platforms like Twitch and YouTube.

=== United Kingdom ===
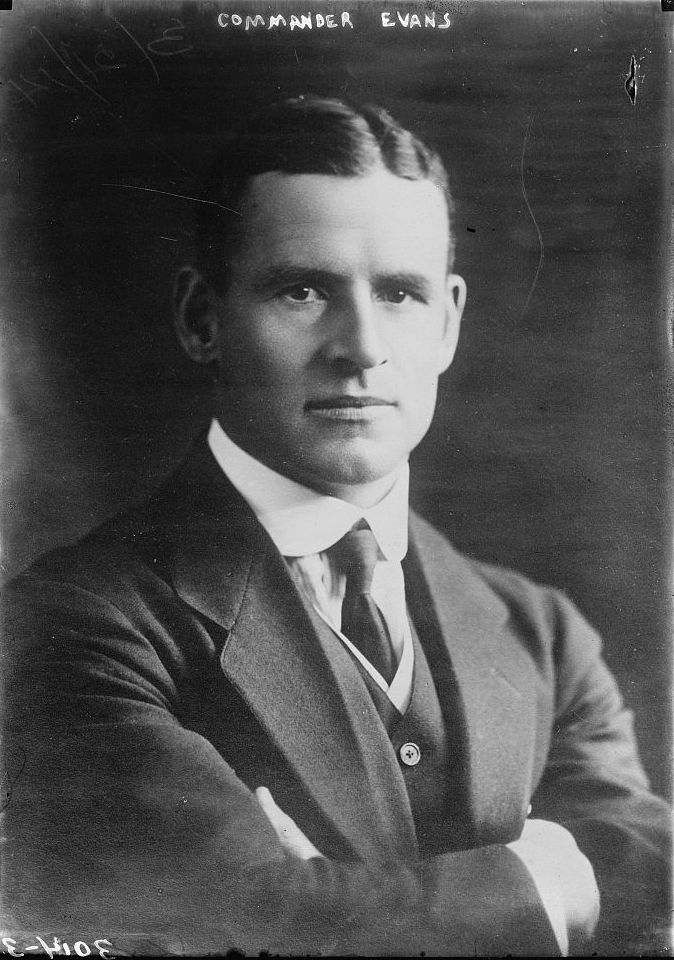
Baron Mountevans headed up a committee which created rules for British professional wrestling. These rules were used to legitimatise wrestling to the public as an actual sport, but their actual purpose was to radically alter the style of presentation used.

At the turn of the 20th century, wrestling was introduced to the public as part of a variety act to spice up the limited action involved in the bodybuilder strongman attractions. One of its earliest stars was a Cornish-American ex-miner named Jack Carkeek, who would challenge audience members to last 10 minutes with him. The development of wrestling within the UK brought legitimate Greco-Roman grappler Georg Hackenschmidt to the country, where he would quickly associate himself with promoter and entrepreneur Charles B. Cochran. Cochran took Hackenschmidt under his wing and booked him into a match in which Hackenschmidt defeated another top British wrestler, Tom Cannon, for the European Greco-Roman title. This gave Hackenschmidt a credible claim to the world title, cemented in 1905 with a win over American Heavyweight Champion Tom Jenkins in the United States. Hackenschmidt took a series of bookings in Manchester for a then impressive £150 a week. Noting Hackenschmidt's legitimately dominant style of wrestling threatened to kill crowd interest, Cochran persuaded Hackenschmidt to learn showmanship from Cannon and wrestle many of his matches for entertainment rather than sport; this displayed the future elements of sports entertainment. Numerous big name stars, both beloved babyfaces and hated heels, came and went during the early inception of wrestling within the UK, with many, like Hackenschmidt, leaving for the US. The resulting loss of big name stars sent the business into decline before the outbreak of World War I in 1914 halted it completely.

While amateur wrestling continued as a legitimate sport, grappling as a promotional business did not catch on until the late 1920s when the success of the more worked aspects of professional wrestling in America, like gimmickry and submission holds, were introduced to British wrestling. Amateur wrestler, Sir Atholl Oakeley got together with fellow grappler Henry Irslinger to launch one of the first promotions to employ the new style of wrestling which was coined "All-in" wrestling. Under the British Wrestling Association banner, Oakley's promotion took off with the likes of Tommy Mann, Black Butcher Johnson, Jack Pye, Norman the Butcher, College Boy, and Jack Sherry on the roster while Oakley himself would win a series of matches to be crowned the first British Heavyweight Champion. The business was reaching one of its highest points at the time, with the best part of forty regular venues in London alone. The great demand for wrestling, however, meant there were not enough skilled amateurs to go around, and many promoters switched to more violent styles, with weapons and chairshots part of the proceedings. Women wrestlers and mud-filled rings also became common place. In the late 1930s, the London County Council banned professional wrestling, leaving the business in rough shape just before World War II.

It was the promoters themselves who revolutionized the business during this time by using America's National Wrestling Alliance territory system under the guise of an alliance of promoters attempting to regulate the sport and uphold the committee's ideas to, in fact, create a promotional cartel designed to carve up control of the business between a handful of promoters - which it did in 1952 under the name of Joint Promotions. By agreeing to rotate talent, and block out rival promoters, Joint Promotions was soon running 40 shows a week, while leaving wrestlers with little bargaining power. One of Joint Promotions' first moves was establishing (and controlling) the championships. At first, this proved a profitable venture, with title matches leading to raise ticket prices. However, perhaps inevitably, attempts to extend this success by bringing in additional titles led to overexposure. While the World and British titles had some credibility (particularly as they were often placed on the more legitimate wrestlers), the addition of European, Empire/Commonwealth, Scottish, Welsh, and area championships got out of hand, and at one point there were conceivably 70 different titleholders to keep track of within Joint Promotions alone.

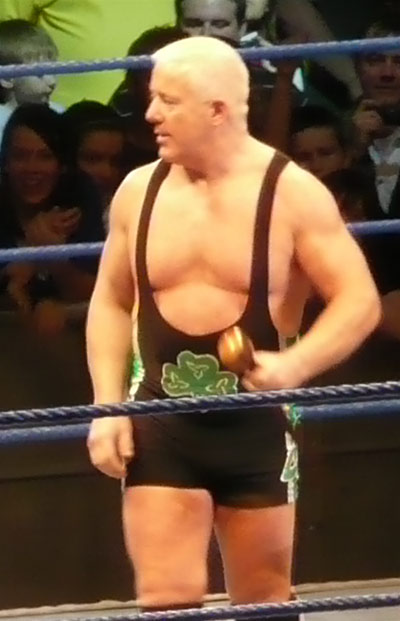
Dave 'Fit' Finlay wrestled for ITV's World of Sport before finding international success in WCW and WWE

But while titles had some success, it was television that took British wrestling to the next level. The first show aired on ABC and ATV (the weekend franchise holders on ITV) on 9 November 1955, featuring Francis St Clair Gregory (father of Tony St Clair) versus Mike Marino and Cliff Beaumont vs Bert Royal live from West Ham baths. The show was successful, and wrestling became a featured attraction every Saturday afternoon from Autumn to Spring each year. In 1964, it went full-time as part of the World of Sport show. Televised wrestling allowed wrestlers to become household names and allowing personality to get a wrestler over just as much as size. The exposure of wrestling on television proved the ultimate boost to the live event business as wrestling became part of mainstream culture. By the mid-1960s, Joint Promotions had doubled their live event schedule to around 4,500 shows a year. Every town of note had a show at least once a month, and at some points more than 30 cities had a weekly date. The success of wrestling on television did however create a better opportunity for the independent groups. The British Wrestling Federation name was used for a rival championship, built around Heavyweight champion Bert Assirati who split away Joint Promotions while still champion and though Joint Promotions vacated the title, Assirati continued to claim it within BWF. BWF would later build itself around a new champion in Shirley Crabtree, a young body builder who won the title after it was vacated by Assirati who retired through injury in 1960. BWF disappeared, together with the young Shirley Crabtree in the early 1960s. The opposition to Joint came from the young Australian promoter, Paul Lincoln.

By 1975, the stranglehold of Joint promotions had almost crumbled, with many of its founding members retiring and the company being bought out several times, leading to the wrestling industry being run by a public company with little experience of the unique business. Finally, promotions were left in the hands of Max Crabtree, the brother of Shirley, who was headhunted by Joint as the most experienced booker still in the business. Crabtree produced the next boom in British wrestling by creating the legend of "Big Daddy", the alter ego of Shirley, who had been unemployed for the best part of 15 years. Although basing a whole cartel on one performer helped with TV viewership, it did not boost the attendance of live events and promotion once again began losing audiences' interest. On 28 September 1985, World of Sport was taken off the air. Wrestling instead got its own show, but the time slot changed from week to week, slowly driving away the regular audience. Far worse for Joint Promotions, however, was that with their contract up, they were forced to share the TV rights as part of a rotation system with All Star Promotions and America's World Wrestling Federation (WWF).

Until 2004, British wrestling took a back seat to professional wrestling in North America as no British television company would broadcast local events. During this time, smaller wrestling companies expanded with evermore growing fan bases. The British style of wrestling is more traditional and technically oriented as opposed to the power moves displayed by their North American counterparts, as well as the high flying lucha libre moves performed by their Mexican counterparts. The slogan/philosophy of British wrestling is simply "We wrestle!"; many old style British wrestlers rarely have signature or finishing moves but instead employ a large array of technical holds and pins to win matches. In 2005, British television network ITV tried to make use of the revived popularity of professional wrestling by starting a Saturday night prime time show called Celebrity Wrestling, featuring celebrities in wrestling style bouts. However, this concept failed due to low ratings.

=== United States ===
==== Origins: 1860s–1948 ====
Newsreel footage of a professional wrestling match between Man Mountain Dean and "Jumping" Joe Savoldi in Los Angeles in 1934

Professional wrestling, in the sense of traveling performers paid for mass entertainment in staged matches, began in the post-Civil War period in the late 1860s and 1870s. During this time, wrestlers were often athletes with amateur wrestling experience who competed at traveling carnivals with carnies working as their promoters and bookers. Grand circuses included wrestling exhibitions, quickly enhancing them through colorful costumes and fictional biographies for entertainment, disregarding their competitive nature. Wrestling exhibits during the late 19th century were also shown across the United States in countless "athletic shows" (or "at shows"), where experienced wrestlers offered open challenges to the audience. It was at these shows, often done for high-stakes gambling purposes, that the nature of the sport changed through the competing interests of three groups of people: the impresarios, the carnies, and the barnstormers.

During the late 19th century-early 20th century, wrestling was dominated by Martin "Farmer" Burns and his pupil, Frank Gotch. Burns was renowned as a competitive wrestler, who, despite never weighing more than 160 pounds during his wrestling career, fought over 6,000 wrestlers (at a time when most were competitive contests) and lost to fewer than 10 of them. He also gained a reputation for training some of the best wrestlers of the era, including Gotch, known as one of America's first sports superstars. Gotch, regarded as "peerless" at his peak, was the first to actually claim the world's undisputed heavyweight championship by beating all contenders in North America and Europe. He became the world's champion by beating European wrestling champion Georg Hackenschmidt, both in 1908 and 1911, seen by modern wrestling historians as two of the most significant matches in wrestling history. Wrestling's popularity experienced a dramatic tailspin in 1915 to 1920, becoming distanced from the American public because of widespread doubt of its legitimacy and status as a competitive sport. Wrestlers during the time recount it as largely faked by the 1880s. It also waned due to Gotch's retirement in 1913, and no new wrestling superstar emerging to captivate the public's eye.

Following the retirement of Gotch, professional wrestling (except in the Midwest) was losing popularity fast. Media attention focused on the illegitimacy of wrestling instead of its athleticism, and without a superstar like Gotch, no major personality reached a wide fanbase. In response, three professional wrestlers, Ed Lewis, Billy Sandow, and Toots Mondt, joined to form their own promotion in the 1920s, modifying their in-ring product to attract fans. The three were referred to as the "Gold Dust Trio" due to their financial success. Their promotion was the first to use time-limit matches, "flashy" new holds, and signature maneuvers. They also popularized tag team wrestling, introducing new tactics such as distracting the referee, to make the matches more exciting. Rather than paying traveling wrestlers to perform on certain dates and combining wrestlers in match-ups when they were available, they decided to keep wrestlers for months and years at a time, allowing long-term angles and feuds to develop. This was the key to their success; they were able to keep wrestlers from their competition, and were able to have regular wrestling cards. Their business succeeded quickly, gaining popularity for its freshness and unique approach to wrestling; a traveling stable of wrestlers. The Trio gained great popularity nationwide during their best years, roughly 1920 to 1925, when they performed in the Eastern territory, acquiring fans from the highly exposed big cities. The Trio was dealt a severe blow by Stanislaus Zbyszko, when he beat the rookie Wayne Munn for their world heavyweight championship, against the original booking. In addition, Zbyszko quickly dropped the title to Joe Stecher, a rival of Ed Lewis, making the situation worse for the Trio. Stecher was afraid of losing his championship, refusing to wrestle many contenders as a result. The Trio responded by calling the Munn-Zbysko match illegitimate, and reinstated Munn as champion, but quickly had him drop it to Lewis. This left two champions, Ed Lewis and Joe Stecher, who were regarded as the dominant wrestlers of the period. Stecher and Lewis did agree to a unification match years later, in 1928, when Stecher gave in and lost the title to Lewis.

==== Territory era: 1948–1984 ====
In 1948, wrestling reached new heights after a loose confederation was formed between independent wrestling companies. This was known as the National Wrestling Alliance (NWA). In the late 1940s to 1950s, the NWA chose Lou Thesz to unify the various world championships into a single "World Heavyweight" title. Thesz's task was not easy, as some promoters, reluctant to lose face, went so far as to shoot title matches to keep their own champions popular with the fans.

Following the advent of television, professional wrestling matches began to be aired nationally during the 1950s, reaching a larger fanbase than ever before. This was a time of enormous growth for professional wrestling, as rising demand and national expansion made it a much more popular and lucrative form of entertainment than in the prior decades. This was called a "Golden Age" for the wrestling industry. It was also a time of great change in both the character and professionalism of wrestlers as a result of the appeal of television. Wrestling fit naturally with television because it was easy to understand, had drama, comedy and colorful characters, and was inexpensive to produce. From 1948 to 1955, each of the three major television networks broadcast wrestling shows; the largest supporter being the DuMont Television Network. By the late 1950s, professional wrestling had lost its high ratings, and producers, realizing that they had overexposed it, soon dropped most wrestling shows from their lineups. The remaining televised wrestling promoters had small, local syndicated shows, which network producers placed as late-night fillers rather than signature programming. Promoters used localized television as a weapon for eliminating the competition by purchasing airtime from rival territories, effectively putting them out of business.

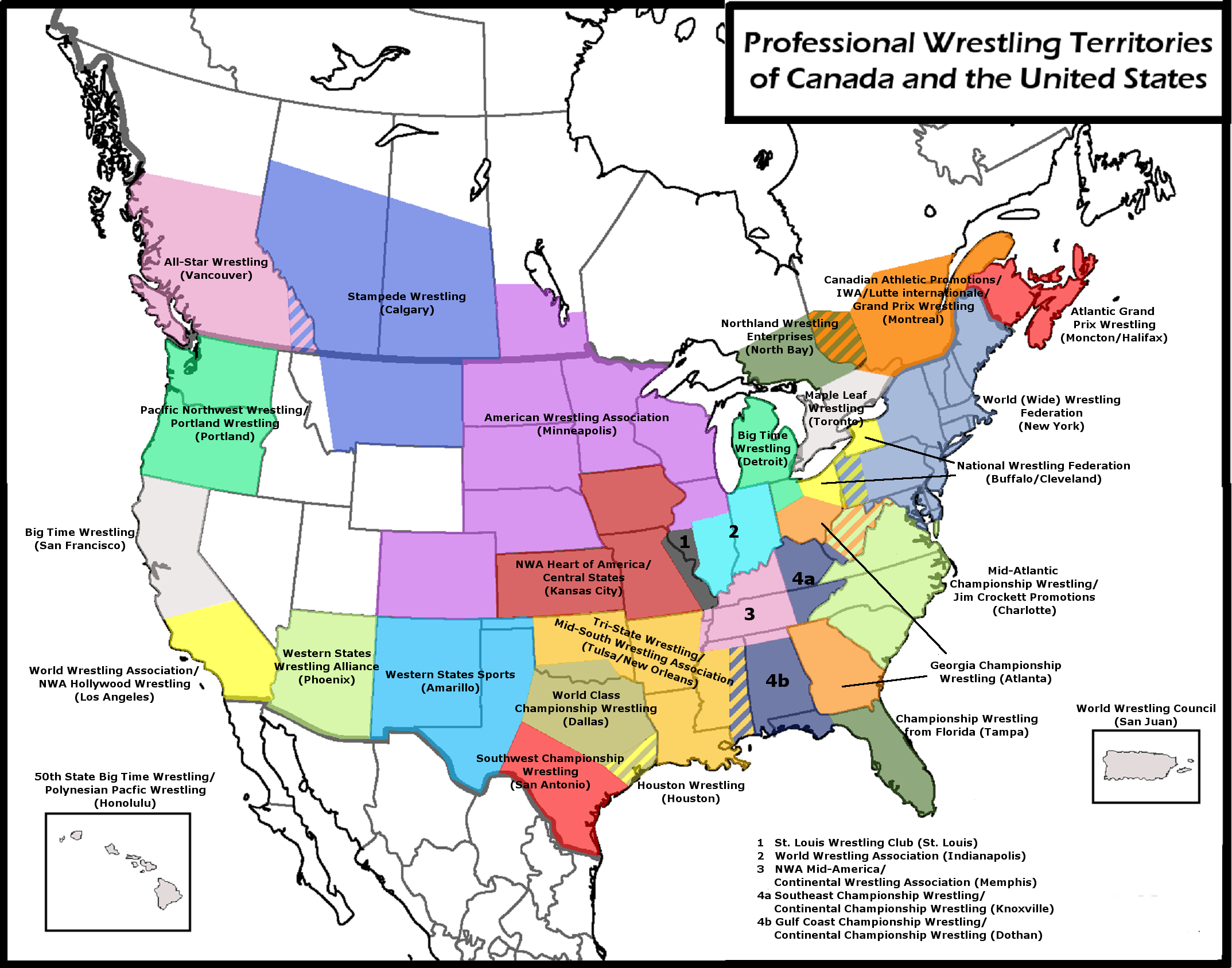
The NWA territory system in North America

The NWA was the most dominant wrestling body in the 1950s, and numerous wrestling promotions had been under its leadership. Many promoters, however, viewed it as a tyrant, holding back innovative changes in the sport. It was during this time that several promoters found reason to leave the organization, managing to find niches in the United States. The most prominent of these were the American Wrestling Association (AWA), which became the most popular wrestling promotion during the 1960s, and the New York-based Capitol Wrestling Corporation (later named World Wide Wrestling Federation). As a top wrestler in the 1950s, Verne Gagne formed his own promotion in the NWA in 1957, which soon became the lead promotion with Gagne winning the World Heavyweight Championship of Omaha. After unsuccessfully lobbying for a title match with the NWA Champion, however, Gagne broke away from the NWA in 1960, renaming his promotion the American Wrestling Association, and making it the dominant organization of the 1960s. Named the AWA World Heavyweight Champion soon after, Gagne was the top wrestler, and engaged in many feuds with heel wrestlers, most notably Nick Bockwinkel, and was the AWA's top draw until his retirement in 1981. Vincent J. McMahon also withdrew the Capitol Wrestling Corporation from the NWA in 1963, as the NWA Champion Lou Thesz was not a strong draw in the area, and in 1979 shortened Worldwide Wrestling Federation to World Wrestling Federation (WWF).

However, with wrestling's decline in the 1970s, the WWF, without its top draw, Bruno Sammartino as champion, suffered a blow, and had to rejoin the NWA in 1971. The WWF, however, rebounded after André the Giant became the company's top superstar when he joined the company in 1973. He was soon the top superstar of all professional wrestling. André became so popular that all NWA territories and the AWA used him, as well. In spite of all this, the NWA as a unit was still on top and gained huge dominance through Georgia Championship Wrestling (GCW), becoming the first nationally broadcast wrestling program on cable television in 1979, airing on the TBS network. By 1981, GCW became the most watched show on cable television.

==== Boom periods: 1984–2001 ====
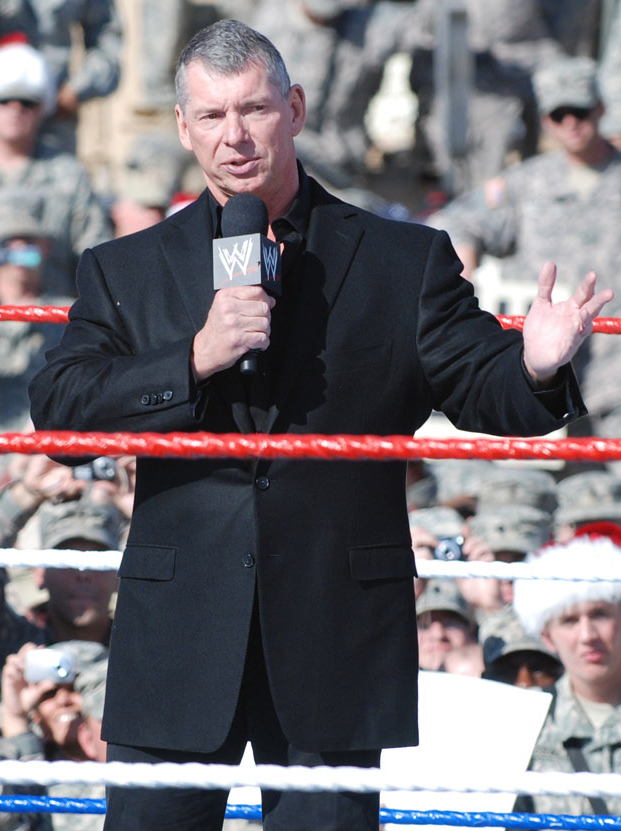
Vince McMahon, the owner of WWE (formerly World Wrestling Federation)

The 1980s represented a boom period for professional wrestling as televised entertainment, reaching widespread popularity among American youth, as well as producing some of its most memorable characters. In comparison to the declining support of media outlets during the 1960s and 1970s, professional wrestling, notably the emerging World Wrestling Federation (WWF; abridged from WWWF in 1979), received great exposure through its reappearance on network television. The WWF expanded nationally through the acquisition of talent from competing promotions and, because it was the only company to air televised wrestling nationally, became synonymous with the industry, monopolizing the industry and the fanbase. The WWF's owner Vincent K. McMahon revolutionized the sport by coining the term "sports entertainment" to describe his on-screen product, downplaying the (still claimed) athletic competition in favor of entertaining viewers as well as enhancing its appeal to children. Most notable was the muscular Hulk Hogan, who marked the 1980s with his "all-American" persona. His sheer size, colorful character, and extravagance made his main events into excellent ratings draws. By January 1984, Hogan's legions of fans and his dominant role in the industry was termed "Hulkamania." The "Rock 'n' Wrestling Connection" was a period of cooperation and cross-promotion between the WWF and elements of the music industry. The WWF attracted a degree of mainstream attention with Cyndi Lauper joining in 1984 and WWF personalities appeared in her music videos.

Meanwhile, the NWA's renowned and highly successful territory system was slowly losing prominence, with Jim Crockett Promotions (JCP) becoming the center of the entire NWA. While the WWF had their major stars at almost all of their shows, the NWA could only manage to have a few of its stars at one show at a time, to promote the product in every territory. After the WWF gained huge dominance with WrestleMania, Crockett responded to the success of the WWF and successfully acquired timeslots on TBS, and would continue to buy out NWA promotions between 1985 and 1987 as well. The advent of nationwide television also weakened the system. Wrestlers could no longer travel to a new market and establish a new persona, since fans there already knew who they were. Meanwhile, McMahon took advantage of this phenomenon by purchasing promotions all over the continent, in order to produce a widely popular nationwide television program and make the WWF the only viewing choice.

To counter the NWA's primary supercard, Starrcade, the WWF created its flagship show, WrestleMania. Large television networks also took wrestling into their weekly programming, including Saturday Night's Main Event, premiering on NBC in 1985, the first wrestling show to air in primetime since 1955. ESPN also began airing professional wrestling for the first time, first airing Pro Wrestling USA shows-which were created as an alliance between the NWA and AWA in 1984, in an effort to counter the national success the WWF was gaining, and later AWA shows, after Pro Wrestling USA fell apart by 1986. WrestleMania III, with a reported record attendance of 93,173 people, is widely considered to be the pinnacle of the period. The episode of The Main Event I is still today the highest rated professional wrestling television show to date, with a 15.2 rating and 33 million viewers.

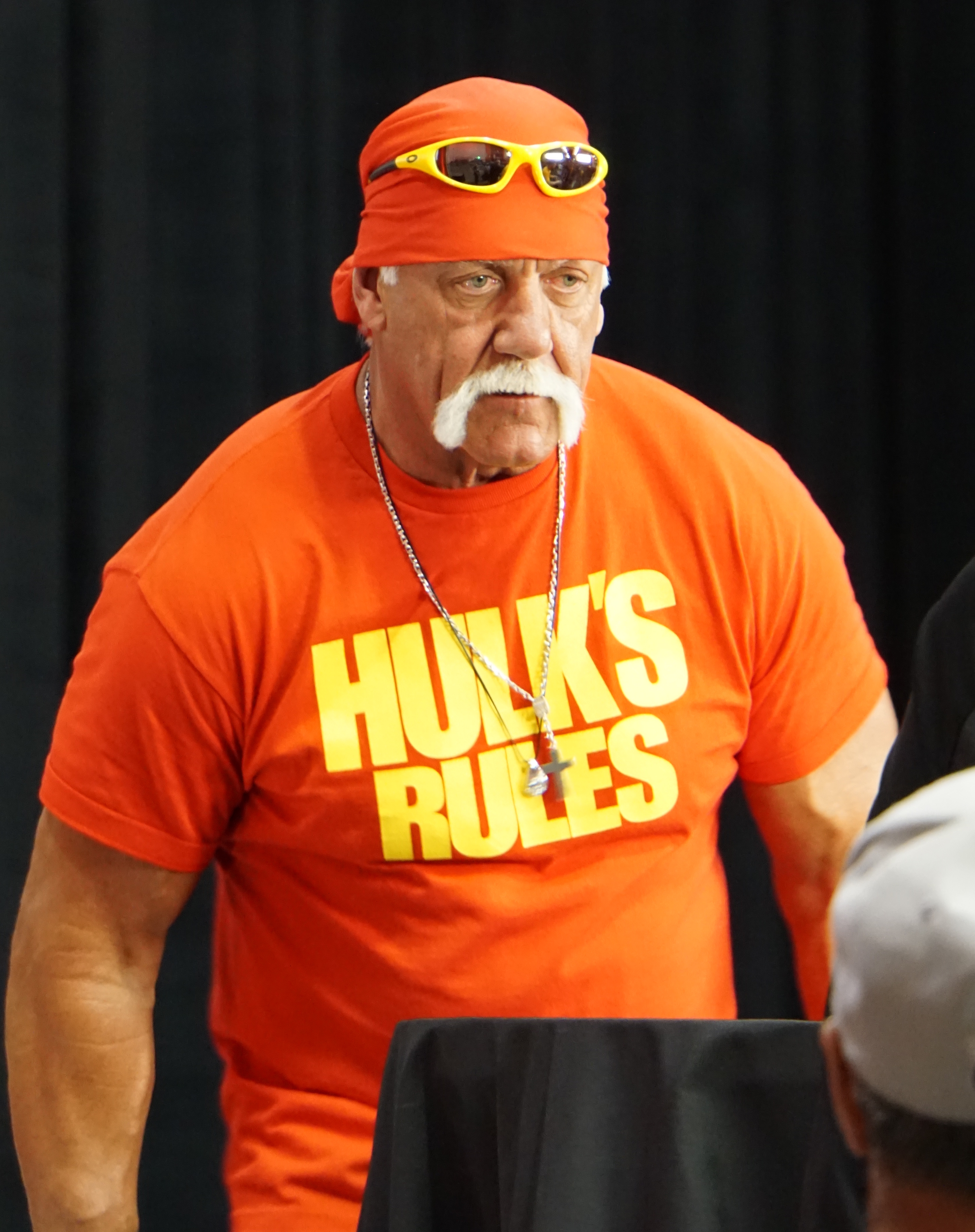
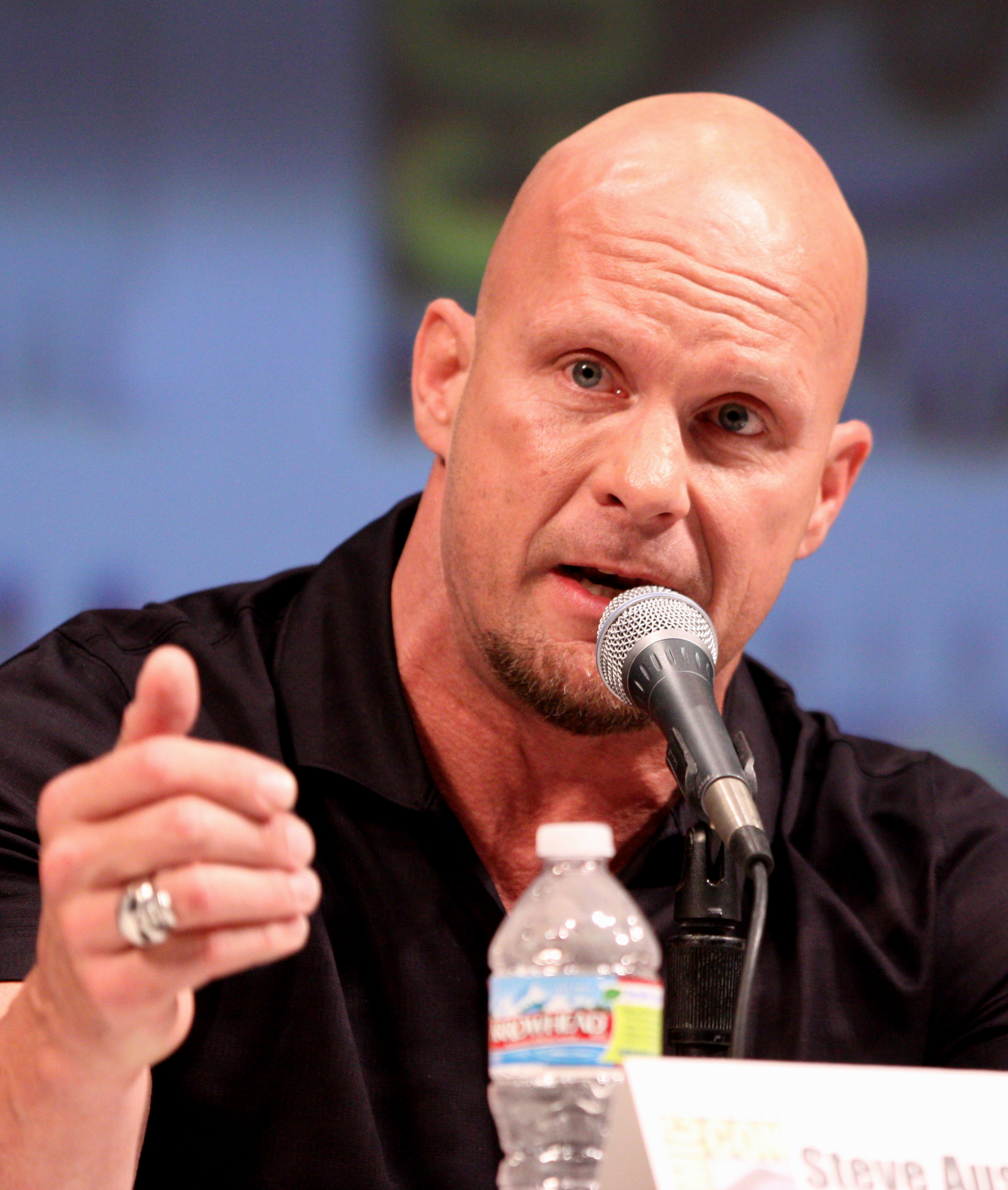
Hulk Hogan and "Stone Cold" Steve Austin are two figures who have shaped professional wrestling in the United States. Both were the most influential in two key eras for WWE: the "Golden Era" in Hogan's case and the "Attitude Era" in Austin's case.

After WrestleMania III, Crockett also acquired the Universal Wrestling Federation – which broke from the NWA in 1986 – and would also establish a second office in their old Dallas headquarters. To fight the WWF's control of the industry, JCP took the NWA's pay-per-view names and used its best talent to draw ratings. Crockett was unable to beat McMahon, however, and McMahon took big bites out of Jim Crockett Promotions by successfully airing the 1987 Survivor Series and 1988 Royal Rumble on the same nights as Starrcade 1987 and the 1988 Bunkhouse Stampede pay-per-view cards. This left him with no viable option other than selling out to media mogul Ted Turner, who renamed the promotion World Championship Wrestling (WCW) and continued to challenge McMahon's monopoly of the industry. Turner promised a more athletic approach to the product, making Ric Flair the promotion's marquee wrestler and giving young stars big storylines and championship opportunities.

During the mid-1990s, the faltering WWF was being hindered by competing brands and nagging legal troubles. The largest troubles came from WCW, whose image changed when Eric Bischoff was appointed the Executive Vice President of WCW in late 1993. He signed former WWF stars and departed from WCW's previous focus on in-ring action in favor of the WWF's approach. WCW competed with WWF for fans in the Monday Night War; the war began in 1995 when WCW started Monday Nitro, a show that ran directly against WWF's Monday Night Raw. While starting fairly even, the war escalated in 1996 with the formation of the heel stable, the New World Order. They helped WCW gain the upper hand when they became the most powerful group in professional wrestling. WCW also came up with more legitimate, edgy storylines and characters over the WWF's cartoon style, and dominated the industry during the years 1996 to 1998.

The WWF began to suffer immediately and started building new stars. WWF was forced to change itself to overcome its competition, remodeling its image in 1997 with added bloodshed, violence, and more profane, sexually lewd characters. This new "Attitude Era" quickly dominated the style and nature of wrestling to become far more teen- and adult-oriented than ever before, and made the WWF regain its status as wrestling's top company from 1998 to 2001.

Away from the WWF and WCW, a new breed of professional wrestling was beginning. NWA Eastern Championship Wrestling renamed itself Extreme Championship Wrestling (ECW) and left the NWA. ECW adapted a hardcore style of wrestling, and it exposed the audience to levels of violence rarely seen in wrestling. The unorthodox style of moves, controversial storylines, and intense bloodthirst of ECW made it intensely popular among many wrestling fans in the 18- to 25-year-old demographic. Its intense fanbase, albeit a small constituency, reached near-cultism in the late 1990s and inspired the "hardcore style" in other wrestling promotions, chiefly WWF and WCW.

==== Modern period: 2001–present ====
In 2001, the WWF (renamed World Wrestling Entertainment (WWE) in 2002) became the dominant company in the global professional wrestling industry with the end of its two leading competitors, WCW and ECW. ECW was in dire financial straits earlier that year and owner Paul Heyman filed for bankruptcy on April 4, 2001. WCW continued to lose more money and finally ended on March 23, 2001 with McMahon buying it out. The WWE also eventually bought out ECW, leaving the company with no real competition in the professional wrestling market.

With a demand remaining for Southern-style, lucha libre, strong style and hardcore wrestling that WWE was not fulfilling, new promotions attempted to offer an alternative to cater to this niche market. The most successful among these were Impact Wrestling (initially known as NWA: Total Nonstop Action) and Ring of Honor (ROH), both started up in 2002. Other independent promotions like Combat Zone Wrestling (CZW) and CHIKARA also began to gain more exposure. In January 2019, All Elite Wrestling (AEW) began operations; AEW began airing Dynamite on Wednesday evenings opposite WWE NXT in October 2019, resulting in the start of the "Wednesday Night Wars". The war was brought to an end when NXT was moved to Tuesday nights.

Other niches include erotic wrestling, as featured in promotions such as the Naked Women's Wrestling League where nude females performed mock combat matches for titillation, as well as the fan-created backyard wrestling.

== See also ==
- History of WWE
- Professional wrestling
