= EWF Tag Team Championship =

Professional wrestling tag team championship

Details
- Promotion: Empire Wrestling Federation
- Date established: December 6, 1996
- Current champion(s): Los Compas (Ray Malvado & Flecha Fugaz)
- Date won: September 23, 2023
Statistics
- First champion(s): The Ghetto Boyz (John Black and Johnny Love)
- Most reigns: The Havana Pitbulls (Ricky Reyes and Rocky Romero) (5 reigns)
- Longest reign: Los MexiMachos (Tio Chulo and Tortuga) (448 days)
- Shortest reign: Anchors Away (David E. Jones and Ryan Stone) (2 days)

The EWF Tag Team Championship is the tag team professional wrestling title in the Southern California-based Empire Wrestling Federation independent promotion. It was established in 1996, when John Black and Johnny Love, The Ghetto Boyz, were declared the first champions. There have been a total of 44 recognized champion teams who have had a combined 65 official reigns.

== Title history ==
Wrestlers:	Times:	Date:	Location:	Notes:
The Ghetto Boyz (John Black and Johnny Love)	1	December 6, 1996	San Bernardino, California	Awarded the title.
Cruising With Danger (Dick Danger and Eddie Williams)	1	April 16, 1997	San Bernardino, California	
The title was vacated on October 10, 1997.
Johnny Love and Eddie Williams	1	March 15, 1998	Hemet, California	Awarded the title.
The Wrecking Crew (Big Q and Billy D)	1	August 2, 1998	Rialto, California	
Knightmare and Krazy K.C.	1	November 8, 1998	Lancaster, California	
The Wrecking Crew (Big Q and Billy D)	2	December 13, 1998	San Jacinto, California	
Bad Influence (Josh Galaxy and Frankie Kazarian)	1	April 17, 1999	Colton, California	
The title were vacated on July 18, 1997 when Galaxy was injured.
Los Cubanitos (Ricky Reyes and Rocky Romero)	1	September 6, 1999	Colton, California	Awarded the title.
Los Cubanitos were stripped of the title on December 4, 1999.
Red Tornado and Sun Warrior	1	February 26, 2000	Parker, Arizona	Won a three-way match to win the vacant title.
The title were vacated on April 8, 2000 when Sun Warrior left the promotion.
Aggravated Assault (Malice and Mayhem)	1	June 25, 2000	San Bernardino, California	Awarded the title.
Los Cubanitos (Ricky Reyes and Rocky Romero)	2	April 29, 2001	San Bernardino, California	
Aggravated Assault (Malice and Mayhem)	2	June 14, 2001	Pahrump, Nevada	
Los Cubanitos (Ricky Reyes and Rocky Romero)	3	February 16, 2002	San Bernardino, California	
Los Cubanitos were stripped of the title on July 1, 2002 for injuring their opponents.
Threat and Desire	1	July 19, 2002	Covina, California	Won a battle royal to win the vacant title.
P.H.A.T. (Eric Matlock and Devon Willis)	1	August 16, 2002	Covina, California	
The Haystacks Brothers (Kyle Haystacks and Lil' Haystacks)	1	November 15, 2002	Covina, California	Defeated Eric Matlock in a handicap match when Devon Willis was unable to attend.
Bo Cooper and Jason King	1	January 24, 2003	Covina, California	Defeated Lil' Haystacks and The Graffiti Kid, subbing for Kyle Haystacks.
Los Chivos (Enigma de Oro and Kayam)	1	May 25, 2003	Covina, California	
The Havana Pitbulls (Ricky Reyes and Rocky Romero)	4	September 26, 2003		
The West Coast Ryders (Rudy Luna and Under Pressure)	4	January 23, 2004	Covina, California	
Bino Gambino and Rudy Luna	1	April 23, 2004	Covina, California	Gambino won a battle royal to become Luna's new partner after Under Pressure left the promotion.
Los Chivos (Enigma de Oro and Kayam)	2	July 23, 2004	Covina, California	
The Havana Pitbulls (Ricky Reyes and Rocky Romero)	5	April 22, 2005		
Los Cubanitos were stripped of the title on May 25, 2005.
Los Chivos (Enigma de Oro and Kayam)	3	July 22, 2005	Covina, California	Defeated The K.I.D.D. and Vizzion, Mistrust (Dan Korbick and Rudy Luna) and The War Machines (Joe Kimbal and Plague) in a four-way match to win the vacant title at Independent's Day: Night Two.
Dan Kobrick and Guerrero Negro	1	November 25, 2005	Covina, California	Won the title at Bloodlust.
Los Chivos (Enigma de Oro and Kayam)	4	December 23, 2005	Covina, California	This was a Masks vs. Title match at Holiday Fear.
La Ola del Mal (Extreme Loco and Black Metal)	1	August 11, 2006	Covina, California	Won the title at Meltdown 2K6.
The Iron Express (Hook Bomberry and Joey Harder)	1	September 8, 2006	Covina, California	Won the title at Cause 4 Concern.
TNT (Johnny Dynamite and Brandon Nitro)	1	April 27, 2007	Covina, California	Won the title at Overkill 2.
Aggravated Assault (Malice and Mayhem)	3	August 24, 2007	Covina, California	This was a Tables match at No Excuses.
La Ola del Mal (Extreme Loco and Black Metal)	2	November 11, 2007	San Bernardino, California	Won the title at Live at the Hudson.
Famous for Fearless (T. J. Perkins and Liger Rivera)	1	June 27, 2008	Covina, California	Won the title at Knockdown Dragout 2.
The Young Bucks (Matt and Nick Jackson)	1	January 10, 2009	Covina, California	Won the title at Breakin' in the New Year.
The A-List (Jeremy Jaeger and Roger Ruiz)	1	June 26, 2009	Covina, California	Defeated The Young Bucks and The Cutler Brothers (Brandon and Dustin) in a three-way match at Knockdown Dragout 3.
SoCal Crazy and Espiritu Infernal	1	December 27, 2009	Rowland Heights, California	
Anchors Away	1	April 23, 2009	Covina, California	
SoCal Crazy and Espiritu Infernal	2	May 21, 2010	Covina, California	
Los Luchas (Phoenix Star and Zokre)	1	September 3, 2010	Covina, California	
La Familia (Raunchy Rico and Damian Arsnik)	1	September 23, 2011	Covina, California	
The A-List (Roger Ruiz and Jeremey Jaeger)	2	January 21, 2012	San Bernardino, California	
Hollywood Underground (Dave the Bruiser and Ein Idol)	1	August 3, 2012	Covina, California	
Barroom Saints (D.K. Murphy and Joshua Dunbar)	1	November 2, 2012	Covina, California	
Von Dooms (Cyanide and Vintage Dragon)	1	December 7, 2012	Covina, California	Defeat the Barroom Saints, Anchors Away: David E. Jones and Ryan Stone, Andrew Hellman and Mike Maze, Jafar and Muhammed Raccid Najjar, and Nothing But Trouble: Eddie Mattson and Maddix in a gauntlet match.
Fallen Empire (Ryan Taylor and Mondo Vega)	1	July 13, 2013	San Bernardino, California	
Von Dooms (Cyanide and Vintage Dragon)	2	April 4, 2013	Covina, California	
Fallen Empire (Ryan Taylor and Mondo Vega)	2	December 6, 2013	Covina, California	Defeat the Von Dooms, Anchors Away: David E. Jones and Ryan Stone, The Revolution: Che Cabrera and Sasha Darveko, The Mixtape Kings: Jacob Diez and Jerome Robinson, and the A-List: Jeremy Jaeger and Roger Ruiz in a gauntlet match.
Anchors Away	2	May 16, 2014	Azusa, California	Defeat Taylor, the Von Dooms: Cyanide and Vintage Dragon, and Los Maravillas: Maravilla Dos and Maravilla Uno in 4-way match.
Fallen Empire (Ryan Taylor and Mondo Vega)	3	May 18, 2014	Covina, California	
Connected (Tommy Wilson and Tyshaun Prince)	1	January 19, 2015	Covina, California	
Congregation of Pain (Archimedes and Juan Roman)	1	May 8, 2015	Covina, California	Defeat the Connected, the Von Dooms: Cyanide and The Vintage Dragon, and the Rebel Renegades: Joe Gamble and Ju Dizz in 4-way match.
Adrian Quest and Andy Brown	1	September 4, 2015	Covina, California	
HATE (Che Cabrera & Rico Dynamite)	1	August 05, 2016	Covina, California	
Super Beetle and Ty Ray	1	June 02, 2017	Covina, California	
HATE (Che Cabrera & Rico Dynamite)	2	October, 2017	California	
Davion Foreman and Jorel Nelson	1	December 01, 2017	Covina, California	
Calder McColl and Dr. Kruger	1	April 06, 2018	Covina, California	
True Grit (Hoss Hogg and Jesse James)	1	May 04, 2018	Covina, California	
Honesty Is The Best Policy (Archimedes and Honest John)	1	March 01, 2019	Covina, California	
Los MexiMachos (MexiMacho I and MexiMacho II)	1	May 03, 2019	Covina, California	
Honesty Is The Best Policy (Archimedes and Honest John)	2	N/A	Covina, California	
The Wolf Zaddies (Che Cabrera and Tito Escondido)	1	July 06, 2019	Covina, California	
The titles were vacated on October, 2021 when the wolf zaddies left the promotion during the covid 19 pandemic.
Anthony Idol & Raunchy Rico	1	October 23, 2021	San Bernardino, California	
Beef Candy (Richie Slade and Flex Mccallion)	1	December, 2021	San Bernardino, California	
Los MexiMachos (MexiMacho I and MexiMacho II)	2	July 02, 2022	San Bernardino, California	
Los Compas (Ray Malvado and Flecha Fugaz)	1	September 23, 2023	San Bernardino, California	
