= Mexican National Championships =

Professional wrestling championships

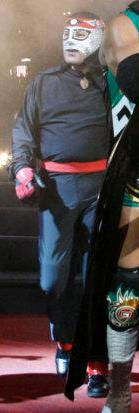
Octagón, the last man to hold the Mexican National Middleweight Championship and one half of the last team to hold the Mexican National Tag Team Championship

The Mexican National Championships (Campeonatos Nacionales in Spanish) is a group of Lucha libre professional wrestling championships that are sanctioned by Comisión de Box y Lucha Libre Mexico D.F. ("the Mexico City Boxing and Wrestling Commission" in Spanish). While the commission sanctions the championships, it does not promote the events in which the championships are defended. Being professional wrestling championships, they are not won legitimately; they are instead won via a scripted ending to a match or awarded to a wrestler or wrestlers as a result of a storyline.

The earliest Mexican National Championship, the Mexican National Heavyweight Championship, was created as far back as 1926. The Mexican National Welterweight Championship crowned its first champion on June 17, 1934, making it the oldest, still active, professional wrestling championship. (Note: The oldest non-Mexican National Championship is the NWA World Heavyweight Championship, which was created on January 5, 1948.) Eléctrico, the current Lightweight champion, is the longest reigning Mexican National Championship, having won the title on August 13, 2013. Atlantis, the reigning Light Heavyweight Champion, has the shortest active reign of any champion, having defeated Mephisto for the championship on August 25, 2015.

Over the years, the commission has created a total of 13 different championships, seven of which for various weight divisions in Mexico. Three of the championships are for various forms of male tag teams. They also created two championships for Women's professional wrestling, a singles championship and a tag team championship. From 1993 through 2006 the commission sanctioned the Mexican National Mini-Estrella Championship, exclusively for the Mini-Estrella championship. Since 2008 the Mexican National Lightweight Championship has been modified to be for Mini-Estrellas division. The commission's most recent championship addition was in 1996 when they created the Mexican National Atómicos Championship, contested for by teams of four. Of the 13 championships, only five remain active. The individual promotions have the promotional control of the championship while the commission only serves to approve the champions and supervise championship matches. The commission normally approve all champions but has on occasion decided to vacate a championship if the promotions did not follow the commission's guidelines. One instance was in 1957 when Mishima Ota won the Lightweight championship, deeming him ineligible because he was a Japanese citizen. Originally, the commission also stated that championships could not be defended in anything other than normal matches, stripping Psicosis II of the championship for defending the Mexican National Middleweight Championship in a hardcore match. At a later point they allowed the Heavyweight Championship to be defended in a steel cage match.

The Mexican National Championships have been promoted by a number of Mexican-based wrestling promotions over the years. Founded in 1933 Consejo Mundial de Lucha Libre (CMLL), has promoted Mexican National Championships since its inception and currently promotes five of the championships, the Lightweight, Light Heavyweight, Welterweight, Women's, and Trios championships. Over the years, CMLL has promoted every single Mexican National Championship except the Atómicos, Featherweight and Cruiserweight Championship. In 1992, Asistencia Asesoría y Administración, later known simply as "AAA", was formed when a number of CMLL wrestlers broke away to create a new company. Several of the wrestlers that left were reigning Mexican National Champions and the Mexico City Boxing and Wrestling commission allowed AAA to take promotional control of those championships at that point. Of the championships. In 2008 AAA abandoned all Mexican National Championships, ending the Middleweight, Atómicos and Tag Team Championship. In 2006 then Mini-Estrellas champion Mascarita Sagrada left AAA while still holding the championship, there was no subsequent announcement that the title was vacated, rendering it inactive from that point on. The commission recognized the Mexican National Women's Tag Team Championship for just under seven years, creating it for CMLL's Women's division and abandoning it when CMLL practically stopped promoting women's wrestling in 1997.

== Championship overview ==
Key

Symbol	Meaning
†	Indicates that the championship is not active
	Title is still active

Championship	Champion(s)	Won	Division	Created	Abandoned	Notes	Ref(s).
Featherweight Championship †	Rayo de Oro	1992	57 kg (126 lb); 63 kg (139 lb)	February 25, 1938	1992	Promoted on the Mexican Independent circuit.	
Lightweight Championship	vacant	November 18, 2026	63 kg (139 lb); 70 kg (150 lb)	June 28, 1934	—	Promoted by CMLL.	
Welterweight Championship	Capitán Suicida	March 31, 2026	70 kg (150 lb); 77 kg (170 lb)	June 17, 1934	—	Promoted by CMLL	
Middleweight Championship	Rey Pegasus	September 25, 2026	82 kg (181 lb); 87 kg (192 lb)	1933	—	Promoted by CMLL	
Light Heavyweight Championship	Vegas Depredador	September 25, 2026	87 kg (192 lb); 97 kg (214 lb)	September 25, 1945	—	Promoted by CMLL	
Cruiserweight Championship †	La Parka Jr.	July 8, 2003	97 kg (214 lb); 105 kg (231 lb)	November 13, 1983	December 8, 2008	AAA abandoned all Mexican National Championship	
Heavyweight Championship	Esfinge	October 27, 2026	Over 105 kg (231 lb)	1926	—	Title originally abandoned in 2013 after then champion Hector Garza died while being champion. It eventually returned in October 2017 under control of CMLL.	
Tag Team Championship	Las Fieras del Ring (Magnus and Rugido)	June 9, 2023	Two man tag teams	June 14, 1957	—	Promoted by CMLL	
Trios Championship	Los Herederos (Felino Jr., Hijo de Stuka Jr., and El Cobarde)	July 9, 2024	Three man tag teams	March 10, 1985	—	Promoted by CMLL	
Atómicos Championship †	Chessman and Los Psycho Circus (Monster Clown, Murder Clown and Psycho Clown)	January 18, 2009	Four man tag teams	August 9, 1996	January 24, 2009	AAA abandoned all Mexican National Championship	
Women's Championship	Thunder Rosa	July 31, 2026	Women	1955	—	Promoted by CMLL	
Women's Tag Championship	Las Valientitas (Hera and Olympia)	September 25, 2026	Female tag teams	August 10, 1990	—	Promoted by CMLL	
Mini-Estrella Championship †	Mascarita Sagrada	November 5, 2004	Mini-Estrellas	January 8, 1993	2006	Championship abandoned when Mascarita Sagrada left AAA	

== Mexican National Heavyweight Championship (1926–) ==
The Mexican National Heavyweight Championship is the oldest actively promotion championship in the world, created in 1926 it predates the NWA Worlds Heavyweight Championship that was created in 1948 and is the oldest US based championship. The first champion was Francisco Aguayo, winning the championship at a time where most wrestling shows were promoted by US-based promoters. In 1933, Salvador Lutteroth formed Empresa Mexicana de Lucha Libre ("Mexican Wrestling Enterprise"; EMLL) and was granted permission by the Mexico City Boxing and Wrestling Commission for the control of the Mexican National Heavyweight Championship. In 1992, then-reigning champion Rayo de Jalisco Jr. left EMLL to join the newly created Asistencia Asesoría y Administración (AAA), taking the heavyweight championship with him to AAA. When Héctor Garza died while champion in 2013, it became inactive, with no champion holding the title for four years. In October 2017, Consejo Mundial de Lucha Libre ("World Wrestling Council"; CMLL, formerly EMLL) brought the championship back under their control.

== Mexican National Middleweight Championship (1933–1993) ==
The Mexican National Middleweight Championship, for wrestlers weighing between 87 kg (192 lb) and 97 kg (214 lb), (Note: Montiel Rojas (2991) p. 23: Capitulo XXVI del peso de los luchadores "Medio 87 kilos / Semicompleto 97 kilos" [Middle 87 kilos / Light Heavy 97 kilos]) was created in 1933 by the "Comisión de Box y Lucha Libre Mexico D.F.". Yaqui Joe was the first champion and the championship was soon defended on EMLL shows as well as on the Mexican independent circuit. (Note: Duncan & Will (2000) p. 392: "Yaqui Joe 1933 ?") Over time EMLL gained almost total control of the championship as they grew to become Mexico's largest promotion at the time. In 1992, Antonio Peña founded Asistencia Asesoría y Administración, taking a number of CMLL wrestlers with him. One of these wrestlers, was the then-reigning National Middleweight Champion Octagón, who took the championship with him to AAA. (Note: Duncan & Will (2000) p. 392: "Octagon 1990/11/20 Mexico City") Blue Panther winning the championship on July 27, 1992, signaled that the commission had granted AAA control of the championship and taken it away from CMLL. (Note: Duncan & Will (2000) p. 392: "Blue Panther 1992/07/24 Leon")

== Mexican National Welterweight Championship (1934–) ==
Created in 1934, the Mexican National Welterweight Championship is for wrestlers who weigh between 77 kg (170 lb) and 87 kg (192 lb). Mario Nuñez became the first champion when he defeated Tony Canales in the final of a tournament. The welterweight championship remained under CMLL's control when AAA was created in 1992, and remains under their control to this date. Karloff Lagarde holds all "longevity" records for the championship. He has had the longest individual reign (1,859 days), the longest combined reign (2,731 days) and the most reigns of any champion, with four. Psicosis holds the record for the shortest reign, having held the title for only two days.
