= Enrique Ugartechea =

Mexican professional wrestler

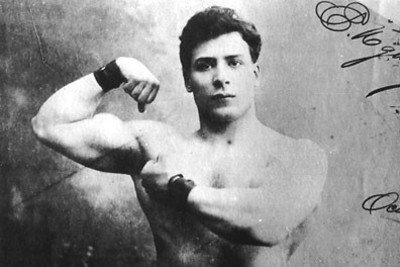

Personal information
- Born: 1882 Xalapa, Veracruz, Mexico
- Died: 1966 (aged 83–84) Mexico City, Mexico

Professional wrestling career
- Ring name: El Hombre Más Fuerte de México

Enrique Ugartechea was a Mexican professional wrestler, trainer, actor, sportswriter, and businessman, considered the creator of the classic Mexican wrestling style and the first professional wrestler in his country.

== Biography ==
Enrique was born in Xalapa, Veracruz, the son of bureaucrat José Ugartechea and Luz Lazarín. Two years after his birth, he and his family moved to Mexico City. At thirteen, he attended a circus performance by the Italian athlete and wrestler Romulus "The Human Scale." Amazed by the artist's strength, he decided to become a wrestler.

In 1903, Ugartechea faced Romulus in a match for his Greco-Roman wrestling championship. The fight took place on June 27 in the bullring in Chapultepec Park. The promotions and results of the fight gained some attention, being published in local newspapers. Unlike the Italian, Ugartechea possessed no fighting skills, relying solely on his athletic build. Despite this, Ugartechea received a standing ovation, while Romulus had to leave the venue amid a shower of garbage. From this moment on, Ugartechea would become known as El Hombre Más Fuerte de México ("The Strongest Man in Mexico)."

Soon, Ugartechea and some fellow bodybuilders and boxers began performing in bullrings, theaters, and carnivals throughout the country. These performances boosted the young Veracruz native's career, and he was sent as an unofficial representative to the 1904 Summer Olympics. This trip would be the first of many, during which Enrique nurtured his athleticism and became the face of Spalding in Mexico.
