= Lucha Libre Femenil =

Mexican professional wrestling promotion

- Acronym: LLF
- Founded: 2000
- Style: Lucha libre
- Headquarters: Monterrey, Nuevo León, Mexico
- Founder: Luciano Alberto Garcia de Luna
- Owner: Luciano Alberto Garcia de Luna
- Website: llf.mx

Lucha Libre Femenil (LLF) is a Mexican women's professional wrestling promotion based in Monterrey, Nuevo León. The promotion was founded in 2000 by Luciano Alberto Garcia de Luna, who still owns the company. The matches take place in the Arena Femenil in downtown Monterrey, near the Macroplaza. The arena is frequently shared with other promotions, but it is solely owned by LLF.

In Lucha Libre Femenil, only matches between female wrestlers are organized. The promotion has helped nurture many young female wrestlers who have gone on to become successful in Mexico's major wrestling promotions such as Lucha Libre AAA Worldwide (AAA) and the Consejo Mundial de Lucha Libre (CMLL). Among the well-known wrestlers who have worked in the promotion include Lady Flammer and Lady Maravilla.

== Champions ==
Current champions

Championship	Current Champion(s)	Held since	Days held
LLF Championship	Baby Love	January 3, 2020	2,279+
LLF Extremo Championship	Estrella Explosiva	March 17, 2017	3,301+
LLF Tag Team Championship	Linda Llamarada and Princesa Quetzal	January 3, 2020	2,279+
