= Salvador Lutteroth III =

Mexican wrestling executive

Personal information
- Born: Salvador Lutteroth Lomelí
- Relatives: Salvador Lutteroth (grandfather); Paco Alonso (cousin)

Professional wrestling career
- Ring name(s): Chavo Lutteroth III; Salvador Lutteroth III; Salvador Lutteroth Lomelí
- Debut: 1970s

Salvador Lutteroth Lomelí (Note: Also written as Salvador Lutteroth Lumelí) is a Mexican businessman and promoter, also known as Salvador Lutteroth III. He is the owner and promoter of the Mexico City-based Consejo Mundial de Lucha Libre (CMLL), the oldest active professional wrestling promotion still in existence. He officially serves as president and general manager of CMLL's parent company Promociones México, Coliseo y Revolución, S.C. A member of the Lutteroth–Alonso family, he is the grandson of CMLL founder Salvador Lutteroth and son of CMLL's second owner Salvador Lutteroth Camou (also known as Salvador Lutteroth Jr.).

== Career ==
Salvador Lutteroth Lomelí first entered his family's lucha libre business in the late 1970s, joining the administrative end of the Consejo Mundial de Lucha Libre (CMLL, then known as Empresa Mexicana de Lucha Libre) wrestling promotion. He acquired further duties within CMLL upon his father Salvador Lutteroth Camou's retirement around 1987 and would work alongside the third owner of the promotion his cousin Paco Alonso. Later, Lutteroth would take a ten year leave from CMLL to work in the Lutteroth–Alonso family's non-wrestling business ventures. After departing CMLL, Lutteroth ran Promebox, a boxing promotion company which collapsed in 2002. He would return to CMLL in 2019, gaining full control of the promotion on August 26 after the death of Paco Alonso and subsequent ousting of Paco's daughter and CMLL's fourth owner Sofía Alonso in a boardroom coup.

== Reception ==
Under Lutteroth's leadership, CMLL entered into a boom period, akin to its mid-2000s "Místico Boom Period", and is viewed as successfully recovering from its steep business decline during the 2010s and the early-2020s COVID period. Under Lutteroth, CMLL's business model additionally modernized and began emphasizing international partnerships (with promotions such as All Elite Wrestling and Major League Wrestling), increased tourism outreach, and saw an influx of new young wrestling talents. In 2025, Lutteroth won the Wrestling Observer Newsletter's Promoter of the Year award while CMLL won the Promotion of the Year award. In 2026, CMLL, under Lutteroth, sold out their home venue, Arena México in Mexico City, 22 times. According to professional wrestling journalist and sports historian Dave Meltzer this set an all-time record for the most sellouts of an over 10,000-seat building in a single calendar year by any professional wrestling company ever.

In September 2025, Lutteroth and CMLL received the Hecho en México ("Made in Mexico") certificate from Mexico's Secretariat of Economy government department. At a ceremony, Lutteroth was presented the certificate by Mexico's economic undersecretary Vidal Llerenas Morales, with Llerenas stating: "if anything truly reflects, as they say, popular culture, Mexican identity, Mexico City, then yes, it is [CMLL] lucha libre." Lutteroth has attempted to position CMLL's product as authentic Mexican lucha libre, particularly after the purchase of its rival Lucha Libre AAA Worldwide (AAA) by American wrestling company WWE in April 2025. After the WWE purchase of AAA, CMLL released a video message declaring "that as long as Arena México exists, lucha libre will never die", and began using the taglines Orgullosamente Mexicana ("Proudly Mexican") and 100% Mexicana ("100 Percent Mexican") in its promotional materials.

Lutteroth's leadership of CMLL has been criticized by former CMLL announcer Leobardo Magadan. After his departure from CMLL in 2024, Magadan claimed that Lutteroth "doesn't know wrestling" and had scolded CMLL announcers for using the English-language names of wrestling moves, which Lutteroth allegedly considered a trait of poor commentary. Lutteroth was also accused of being directly responsible for the departures of Dragon Lee and Rush from CMLL. According to Dave Meltzer, Lutteroth and CMLL had fired Lee for participating in Pro Wrestling Guerrilla's 2019 Battle of Los Angeles after they told him to not work in the tournament. In response, Lee's brother Rush published a video on YouTube in which he quit CMLL and voiced his support for Sofía Alonso over Lutteroth. Numerous other wrestlers, including L. A. Park, would also depart CMLL during this early period of Lutteroth's stewardship of the promotion and voice their support for Sofía and her deceased father Paco Alonso over Salvador.

== Awards and accomplishments ==
- Consejo Mundial de Lucha Libre
  - Copa Bobby Bonales recipient (2024)
- Major League Wrestling
  - Special Honoree at the 2024 Azteca Lucha event
- Secretariat of Economy
  - Hecho en México certificate
- Wrestling Observer Newsletter
  - Promoter of the Year (2025)
