= Wrestling Summit =

2006 National Wrestling Alliance event

The Wrestling Summit La Copa de Lucha
- Promotion(s): National Wrestling Alliance; NWA Pro/Pro West
- Date: September 22, 2006
- City: Paradise, Nevada
- Venue: Orleans Arena
- Attendance: 3,800

The Wrestling Summit or La Copa de Lucha was a professional wrestling event held on September 22, 2006 at the Orleans Arena in Paradise, Nevada. Promoted by NWA Pro Wrestling, the event was a ground-breaking attempt to mix the American professional wrestling style with the Mexican lucha libre style. The event was a huge success and spurred the NWA to tour across the nation with the hybrid combination.

== The Event ==
=== La Copa de Lucha ===
The Wrestling Summit featured a 4-team international tag team tournament called La Copa de Lucha. The four countries represented were:

- Team Canada: Canadian Spymaster A and Canadian Spymaster B
- Team Japan: Black Tiger and Puma
- Team Mexico: Phoenix Star and Zokre
- Team (United States) U.S.A.: Joey Ryan and Karl Anderson

In the first round, Team Mexico was able to outlast the technically superior Team Japan while Team U.S.A. easily handled the relatively unknown Team Canada. On their way to the ring for the finals, Team U.S.A. enraged the mostly Latino crowd by calling for immigration and throwing flour tortillas into the stands. The crowd responded by throwing back not only the tortillas, but also everything they could get their hands on. The entire match was fought amid a downpour of popcorn and beer. In the end, Team Mexico capitalized on a mistake by Team U.S.A. and captured the Copa de Lucha trophy. This match sparked a near two-year feud between “Los Luchas” (Phoenix Star and Zokre) and “The Real American Heroes” (Ryan and Anderson).

=== Other Matches ===
In addition to the tournament and the double main event, The Wrestling Summit featured matches with top caliber wrestlers from around the world. Those matches included:

- (United States) Sean “Syxx-Pac” Waltman defeated Cuba’s Rocky Romero
- (Mexico) Konnan and (United States) Human Tornado defeated (United States) Aaron Aguilera and (United States) Al Katrazz
- Brazil’s Kafu and (United States) Babi Slymm defeated (United States) Colt Cabana and Kazakhstan’s The Plague
- (United States) Derek Sanders and (Mexico) Durango Kid def. NWA British Commonwealth Champion (Republic of Ireland) Ireland’s Paul Tracey and (Mexico) Zarco

=== Double Main Event ===
The first half of the double Main Event saw a rekindling of a classic SoCal wrestling feud between (United States) “Scrap Iron” Adam Pearce and (United States) “The Future” Frankie Kazarian. Kazarian took the early advantage, but a low kick behind the referee’s back helped Pearce secure the victory.

In the event’s finale, Mexican legends (Mexico) El Hijo del Santo and (Mexico) Rey Misterio, Sr. took on the team of (Mexico) L.A. Park and (Mexico) Fobia in a traditional 2 out of 3 falls Lucha Libre match. In the end, the technico team of Santo and Misterio outwrestled the rudo team to the crowd’s delight to pick up the win.

== Notes ==
- This event was the first NWA DVD to be produced and released by Big Vision Entertainment. It featured Todd Keneley and David Marquez on commentary.
- At multiple times during the event, manager C. Edward Vander Pyle came to ringside to scout potential talent. Vander Pyle would put together his stable of Pearce, Ryan and Anderson when the NWA returned to the Orleans Arena with Fiesta Lucha.
- Ron Killings was advertised to be at the event, but cancelled after all promotional materials were distributed. Mil Mascaras was also advertised, but was unable to make the event due to a minor injury. They were replaced by Rocky Romero and Human Tornado.

== See also ==
- 2006 in professional wrestling
