= Fiesta Lucha =

Professional wrestling event held on February 25, 2007

- Promotion(s): National Wrestling Alliance; NWA Pro Wrestling
- Date: February 25, 2007
- City: Paradise, Nevada
- Venue: Orleans Arena
- Attendance: 3,900

Fiesta Lucha was a professional wrestling event held on February 25, 2007, at the Orleans Arena in Paradise, Nevada. Promoted by NWA Pro Wrestling, the event was the follow-up to the ground-breaking Wrestling Summit which mixed American professional wrestling with Mexican lucha libre. The event was the kick-off to a tour that included: Phoenix, Arizona; Kissimmee, Florida; Hammond, Indiana and several stops in Texas including Houston, El Paso, McAllen, Laredo, Hidalgo and Corpus Christi.

== The Event ==
In keeping with the success of their previous event at the Orleans Arena, the NWA included wrestlers from across the globe including Mexico, Canada, Australia, Brazil, Cuba, China and Uzbekistan.

Many of the matches were set up by events that took place on the NWA Pro Wrestling Showcase TV Program.

=== Four Corner’s Tag Team Match ===
Four of the top tag teams in NWA Pro Wrestling were scheduled to face off in the opening contest. JJ Perez's tag team partner T. J. Perkins was snowed in at an airport in Canada. Perez chose Tommy Kim to replace Perkins. Kim's regular Pacific Express partner Dana Lee was on the shelf with an injury.

Perez and Kim teamed up to take on the established teams of Midnight Dynamite – Charles Mercury and Johnny Paradise, E.G.O. – Nathan Rulez and AJ Kirsch with their manager Johnny LaRocca and The Young Bucks – Matt Jackson and Nick Jackson. After a fast-paced battle, the Young Bucks came away with the victory.

=== Wrestling Society X Challenge ===
A special attraction match was added to the Fiesta Lucha as the first official Wrestling Society X match to take place outside the WSX Bunker featured Los Pochos Guapos – Aaron Aguilera and Joey “Kaos” Munoz taking on the Human Tornado and Matt Classic. In typical Guapos fashion, a miscommunication between Aguilera and Munoz led to them losing their match.

=== NWA Heritage Title Match ===
“Scrap Iron” Adam Pearce defended his NWA Heritage Championship against Nelson Creed. During the opening portion of the match, Pearce's former manager C. Edward Vander Pyle joined Pearce at ringside and made it very clear via his interjections that he and Pearce were back together. Pearce won the match by disqualification when referee Joe Furrer found Creed holding a foreign object that Pearce had actually used.

=== U.S.A. vs. Mexico Flag Match ===
In a rematch from the Copa de Lucha finals, Los Luchas – Phoenix Star and Zokre took on the Real American Heroes – Joey Ryan and Karl Anderson in a U.S.A. vs. Mexico Flag Match. Before the event began, Ryan and Anderson had enraged the crowd by making fun of Los Luchas’ Mexican heritage.

The match itself topped their Copa de Lucha match in terms of intensity both from the wrestlers and from the crowd. The finish to the match saw C. Edward Vander Pyle leave the broadcast booth to distract referee Scott DeMarco as Phoenix Star had grabbed the Mexican flag, which should have ended the match. Adam Pearce ran in behind the referee's back, threw Phoenix Star from the ring and then broke the wooden flagpole across Zokre's back allowing Ryan to get the pinfall. Nelson Creed came in to run off the Americans. A YouTube upload of this match has been viewed over 300,000 times.

=== Other Matches ===
“The Brazilian Beast” Kafu defeated Peter Goodman in singles action.

“Classic” Colt Cabana and Sonny Samson defeated Ricky Reyes and Bobby Marshall.

=== King of the Summit Battle Royal ===
Among the highlights of the evening was the 25-Man, over the top rope, King of the Summit timed entry battle royal. Wrestlers drew numbers before the show and entered every 45 seconds based on the number they drew.

Order of entry:

- 1. Steve Pain
- 2. Bigg Q
- 3. Nathan Rulez
- 4. Ryan Taylor
- 5. Diablo (a.k.a. Dustin Cutler)
- 6. Bobby Marshall
- 7. Johnny Paradise
- 8. Charles Mercury
- 9. Sexy Chino
- 10. Webster Dauphiney
- 11. Tommy Kim
- 12. JJ Perez
- 13. Roughneck Ryan
- 14. Scott Lost
- 15. Matt Jackson
- 16. AJ Kirsch
- 17. Nick Jackson
- 18. (Australia) Damian Slater
- 19. Sonny Samson
- 20. Cameron Wallis
- 21. Ray Murillo
- 22. Kafu
- 23. Peter Goodman
- 24. Ultra-X
- 25. Jerome Robinson

The final five in the match were Kafu, Peter Goodman, Jerome Robinson, Roughneck Ryan and Sexy Chino. Chino had been nearly eliminated by almost every wrestler ever since he first stepped into the ring. Kafu eliminated Samson, Marshall, Murillo, Lost, Wallis, Ultra-X, Slater and Perez to clear the ring. He then took Robinson, pressed him over his head and tossed him into the isle where his other eliminations were making their way to the locker room. With his back turned, Goodman and Ryan eliminated Kafu and turned their attention to Chino. Ryan attempted to clothesline Chino, but missed and eliminated Goodman. Chino then dropkicked Ryan over the rope to win the match.

An upset Ryan attacked Chino immediately after the match, but Kafu chased him off. Chino, Kafu and referee Jesse Hernandez then danced in celebration to the crowd's delight.

=== Main Event ===
In a battle of feuds that went back many, many years, Mexican legend El Hijo del Santo teamed with Billy Kidman to take on Super Parka and Nicho el Millonario. Kidman had taken Nicho's mask when he wrestled as Psicosis in 1999 and Super Parka lost his mask to Santo in 2003. Still protesting the match years later, Parka wore his mask to the ring only to have Santo tear it off in the middle of the contest. After an intense and hard-fought battle, Kidman pinned Nicho to pick up the victory.

== Notes ==
- This event was released on DVD by Big Vision Entertainment. It featured Kris Kloss and C. Edward Vander Pyle on commentary, although Vander Pyle did leave the commentary position to interject himself into two of the matches. Backstage interviews were handled by David Marquez and Mark Thompson.
- Wrestling legend Nick Bockwinkel was in attendance and was introduced to the crowd before the NWA Heritage Title match. After wishing Nelson Creed luck, Bockwinkel's handshake attempt was ignored by Adam Pearce.
- Super Porky was scheduled to be at the event but missed his flight. His match with Colt Cabana was changed to a tag team match.
