= Marty Lurie =

American wrestling manager (born 1972)

Marty Laurie
Personal information
- Born: December 10, 1972 (age 53) Buffalo, New York, U.S.

Professional wrestling career
- Ring name(s): C. Edward Vander Pyle; Mr. Vander Pyle
- Billed height: 6 ft 2 in (188 cm)
- Billed weight: 300 lb (136 kg)
- Trained by: Adam Pearce

Marty Lurie (born December 10, 1972), is a professional wrestling manager and commentator better known by his stage name C. Edward Vander Pyle or Mr. Vander Pyle. In addition to his ring persona, he is the General Manager of the NWA Pro group located in Southern California.

== Career ==
=== Pre-Wrestling ===
Before entering the wrestling business Marty Lurie spent considerable time in the music business as a producer and road manager for Chicago, Illinois based independent acts such as Chris Prchal and Mugs Alley. He toured throughout the Midwest with Certain Distant Suns in various roles. In addition to music, he was involved in several independent film projects. It was at this time he met professional wrestler Adam Pearce.

=== Early career ===
Shortly after Marty moved to Los Angeles, California Adam Pearce requested that he create a ring name to become his new wrestling manager. Pearce had become disappointed with the direction professional wrestling had taken and took a long hiatus from performing. After watching several tapes of his favorite wrestlers and realizing that most of the great old school heels had managers by their side, Adam decided that was what he was missing. Marty accepted the offer and C. Edward Vander Pyle was born.

Mr. Vander Pyle debuted alongside Adam Pearce at a small show in a San Diego ocean front bar that had a total of 4 paid fans in attendance. The debut was an interruption of a match followed by a self-interview in which Adam introduced Vander Pyle to the world. In their debut match, Mr. Vander Pyle managed Adam Pearce and Primetime Peterson against Al Katrazz and Jason Allgood in a main event for Lemon Grove, CA based WCWA. The next show saw Mr. Vander Pyle capture the WCWA Heavyweight Title from Al Katrazz due to a 24/7 stipulation in which the champion could be pinned by anyone at any time. 18.4 seconds after capturing the title, Vander Pyle lost it to Jason Allgood marking it one of professional wrestling's shortest title reigns.

Vander Pyle went on to bigger success in the early days of Pro Wrestling Guerrilla as a featured player alongside Pearce as well as Hardkore Inc. members Aaron Aguilera and Al Katrazz and Pearce's longtime friend from Chicago, "Classic" Colt Cabana. In addition to their PWG exploits Pearce and Vander Pyle began to cause havoc in Newhall, CA's APW-LA and Tijuana, Mexico’s Promociones XLUM. Lucha Libre does not have managers and Vander Pyle's presence, along with his carrying of a U.S. Flag and broken Spanish on the mic, added to the immense heat his group generated. During a sold-out show in el Auditorio de Tijuana over 5,500 fans rained garbage on the Vander Pyle led American group The San Diego Horsemen nearly causing a full blown riot.

=== 2004–2005 ===
Early 2004 saw a brief split between Pearce and Vander Pyle. Marty's mother had contracted lung cancer and he took time off from wrestling to be with her. When he returned, to the shock of Southern California fans, it was not by Adam's side but rather in the corner of Pearce's rival Babi Slymm. Vander Pyle and Slymm were eventually joined by Frankie Kazarian, Scott Lost and Marty's friend and fellow Northern Illinois University graduate Brad Bradley as the short lived First Family.

Vander Pyle and Slymm moved on to Bart Kapitzke's Alternative Wrestling Show in City of Industry, CA. Slymm defeated Pearce to capture the first ever AWS Heavyweight Championship in an AWS Idol Match in which Slymm and Pearce sang to the crowd before fighting. Hosted by Jason Allgood the judges were Al Katrazz, Nikki T and Vander Pyle. Vander Pyle went on to lead Slymm in successful defenses against Joey Ryan, American Dragon, B-Boy, Scorpio Sky, Scott Lost and more before turning on Babi Slymm with the returning Adam Pearce (under a hood as Masked Spymaster #2). Pearce took the title from Slymm before losing it to the Human Tornado who then lost it to the Vander Pyle led Al Katrazz. Vander Pyle held the distinction of managing 3 of the 4 men who had held the belt when Al Katrazz won the title.

In addition to being part of the main feuds in the ring at AWS, backstage Marty was instrumental in associating AWS with David Marquez’s NWA Pro group. This allowed for a new talent exchange that helped AWS showcase wrestlers from throughout the globe who were in town to train at NWA Pro and New Japan Pro-Wrestling’s LA Inoki Dojo. Vander Pyle had the distinction of being the first American manager to appear on New Japan Pro-Wrestling TV in nearly 20 years as he appeared at their Toukon 7 special taped in Los Angeles. Off screen Marty was a part of the production team for both Toukon 7 special and the NJPW "Toukon Fighting Spirit" TV show.

Back in the ring, Vander Pyle was a part of one of UPW’s largest events ever entitled Overload as he managed Adam Pearce against Diamond Dallas Page at Buffalo Bill's Resort and Casino in Las Vegas.

=== 2006 ===
Marty served in the role of Talent Coordinator for MTV’s "Wrestling Society X" first and only season. When UPW returned to smaller shows in 2006, Vander Pyle began to manage Joey Ryan in a series of matches in which they tested the top UPW students. Vander Pyle also became one of very few modern managers to work both coasts as he worked the inaugural Liberty States Wrestling (later called NWA New Jersey and NWA On Fire) events in Lodi, New Jersey and Lowell, Massachusetts.

At AWS, Vander Pyle was involved in the long-standing feud between Adam Pearce and Aaron Aguilera and their allies. The highlight of the feud included: a 4-on-4 War Games match where Team El Jefe(Aguilera, Human Tornado, Babi Slymm and Sexy Chino) defeated Team Vander Pyle(Pearce, Al Katrazz, Crayz and Plague); a manager/wrestler mixed tag team match of Pearce and Vander Pyle against Aguilera and El Jefe in which Jefe pinned Vander Pyle; and a Strap Match where Aguilera vanquished Pearce once and for all leading to another break-up between Pearce and Vander Pyle.

=== 2007 ===
In February, Vander Pyle and Pearce reunited at NWA Pro's Fiesta Lucha at the Orleans Arena in Las Vegas, NV. Vander Pyle helped Pearce keep the NWA Heritage Championship in a match against Canada's Nelson Creed. Later in the evening Pearce and Vander Pyle interfered on behalf of Joey Ryan and Karl Anderson's Real American Heroes in their Flag Match against Mexico's Los Luchas (Phoenix Star and Zokre). Vander Pyle distracted referee Scotty DeMarco while Pearce broke a flag pole over Zokre's back allowing Ryan to get the pinfall. A YouTube upload of this match has been viewed over 300,000 times.

With three main wrestlers in stable, Vander Pyle stayed very busy at NWA Pro arena shows across the country and particularly in Texas. Pearce feuded with Sean 'X-Pac' Waltman trading the Heritage Title at events in El Paso, TX and Laredo, TX. Ryan and Anderson continued their feud with Los Luchas including matches in Phoenix, AZ, Orlando, FL and throughout Texas and California. An extremely notable match from this period saw Ryan, Anderson and Vander Pyle incite a riot at Plaza San Miguel in Houston, TX before their scheduled match with Último Dragón and T. J. Perkins. On a rodeo arena floor covered in dirt and rocks and with no guardrails, chairs or ringside security, the mostly Mexican crowd of over 5,000 showered the Americans as well as ring announcer Andy Schmitz and referee Joe Furrer with rocks, bottles and more. At point blank range and with no one to stop them, the barrage of trash from the crowd was too much for the wrestlers to handle as they fought their way back to the locker room. Dragon and Perkins signed autographs for over ten minutes while referee Jesse Hernandez pleaded with the crowd to calm down and let the event continue.

After the NWA ended their relationship with TNA Wrestling on May 13, 2007 both the NWA World Heavyweight Championship and the NWA World Tag Team Championship were declared vacant. C. Edward Vander Pyle pulled off the incredible feat of becoming manager of both championships. First he led the team of Joey Ryan and Karl Anderson to victory in a 3 team gauntlet match in McAllen, TX over the team of Incognito and Sicodelico, Jr. and then the team of Sean Waltman and Billy Kidman. Vander Pyle then led Adam Pearce to a controversial victory in the Reclaiming the Glory 16-man tournament for the NWA World Heavyweight Title. Pearce won his first round match against longtime rival Aaron Aguilera in Lodi, NJ and his second round match against Chad Parham at an Empire Wrestling Federation event in Covina, CA. Pearce then lost his third round contest to Bryan Danielson in Vancouver, British Columbia, Canada but advanced to the finals when Danielson suffered an eye injury a week before he could fight for the title. Pearce went on to defeat Brent Albright in Bayamón, Puerto Rico with Vander Pyle's assistance to claim the title.

Vander Pyle led his champions to several successful title defenses throughout the rest of the year. Pearce defended the World Title against challengers such as Sean Waltman, Sicodelico, Jr., Lil' Cholo and more. Ryan and Anderson defended against Los Luchas, TNT (Brandon Gatson and Johnny Dynamite), The Young Bucks and more. Ryan, Anderson and Vander Pyle also travelled to Perth, Western Australia to defend against top Aussie fighters Hartley Jackson and Shane Haste.

=== 2008 ===
Despite his best efforts, Vander Pyle's Real American Heroes team of Ryan and Anderson finally lost the NWA World Tag Team Titles to Los Luchas at a NWA Wrestling Showcase taping at the Plaza Hotel and Casino in downtown Las Vegas, NV. Shortly after this loss, Karl Anderson was offered a contract with New Japan Pro-Wrestling leaving the Vander Pyle family with only two main wrestlers.

Adam Pearce continued a series of successful title defenses against wrestlers such as Shane Haste, Scorpio Sky, Lil' Cholo, Matt Jackson, SoCal Crazy, Tommy Wilson, T. J. Perkins and primarily Brent Albright. the Pearce and Albright feud extended past the NWA and into Ring of Honor Wrestling where Pearce had no manager. Thus Vander Pyle was not there when Pearce lost and regained the championship against Albright. Vander Pyle was in Pearce's corner when he lost the championship a second time in Mexico City, Mexico to the legendary Blue Demon, Jr. in controversial fashion. As Demon held Pearce in a single leg crab hold, Pearce's arm stretched under the bottom rope which should have constituted a clean break. Despite Vander Pyle's protests, the referee would not check the arm in question as Pearce passed out and lost the championship.

Joey Ryan and Vander Pyle went through a series of potential replacements for Anderson, but never settled on a full-time partner. Ryan also had several singles matches including a huge victory over TNA star Frankie Kazarian. However Vander Pyle could not manage to get a championship on Joey as they fell short in attempts at the AWS Championship, the EWF Championship and even a shot at Blue Demon after his victory over Pearce.

=== 2009 ===
2009 saw Vander Pyle's main two wrestlers attempting to get back into title contention by facing any and all upcoming wrestlers. Though rarely teaming together, Pearce and Ryan feuded with many of the same fighters including Johnny Yuma, Willie Mack, Johnny Goodtime and more. Ryan also feuded with James Morgan in NWA associate Mach One Wrestling over their Championship and scored a big victory over Scotty II Hotty at the Long Beach Comic Con thanks to Vander Pyle's shenanigans. Pearce and Vander Pyle continued their quest for Blue Demon by teaming with Oliver John against Demon and Incognito in Pearce and Vander Pyle's return to Tijuana.

=== 2010 ===
Vander Pyle added a new member to his wrestling family when he became the manager of Ricky Mandel at NWA's SoCal Pro Wrestling in Oceanside, CA. Vander Pyle has been instrumental in keeping Mandel's former tag team partner Hector Canales away from him allowing Mandel to pursue the SCP Championship. In a strange turn of events, Vander Pyle and Joey Ryan found themselves being cheered by fans at Mach One Wrestling's weekly Friday Fight Night in Anaheim, CA after standing up to Australian upstart Bobby Marshall. Adam Pearce and Vander Pyle continue to plan their attack on Blue Demon in an attempt to regain the NWA World Heavyweight Championship.

Outside of the ring, Marty began blogging for www.nwawrestling.com about his exploits in wrestling and his work in the NWA Pro office.

== Wrestlers managed ==
- Aaron Aguilera
- Adam Pearce
- Al Katrazz
- Babi Slymm
- Ballard Brothers
- Brad Bradley
- Colt Cabana
- Dru Onyx
- Eric Matlock
- Frankie Kazarian
- Jason Allgood
- Joey Ryan
- Karl "Machine Gun" Anderson
- Little Guido
- Mikey Nicholls
- Nicho el Millonario
- Oliver John
- Plague
- Ricky Reyes
- Rob Conway
- Ricky Mandel
- Rocky Romero
- Scott Lost
- Shane Haste
- Topgun Talwar

== Championships and accomplishments ==
- World Class Wrestling Alliance
  - WCWA Heavyweight Championship (1 time)
