= Radio 5 =

Radio 5 may refer to:

== Radio stations ==
- BBC Radio 5 Live, a British radio station
- BBC Radio 5 Sports Extra, a British radio station
- BBC Radio 5 (former), a former British radio station
- NPO Radio 5, a Dutch radio station
- Radio 5 (Spanish radio station), an all news radio station operated by Radio Nacional de España
- WDR 5, a German public radio station
- 5FM, a South African radio station, formerly known as Radio 5
- Radio 5, the former name of Malaysian Chinese-language radio station Ai FM
- Radio 5, the former name of Singaporean radio station Symphony 924

== Other uses ==
- Radio 5, a 1982 album by British band Alkatrazz
