= Los Luchas =

Professional wrestling tag team

Tag team
- Members: Phoenix Star; Zokre
- Name(s): Los Luchas Espectaculares; Los
- Billed from: San Diego, California

Los Luchas is a Mexican professional wrestling tag team that consists of Phoenix Star and Zokre. They are best known for their reign as NWA World Tag Team Champions and their tenure in Pro Wrestling Guerrilla (between 2003 and 2009).

== History ==
Originally called “Los Luchas Espectaculares”, most English speaking announcers couldn't pronounce their name and thus Phoenix Star and Zokre became known simply as "Los Luchas". In 2003 they had a series of matches with the “X-Foundation” of Joey Ryan and Scott Lost at the Alternative Wrestling Show in City of Industry, California. Los Luchas eventually defeated the X-Foundation for the AWS Tag Team Championship.

Over the next two years Los Luchas would hone their skills in the SoCal wrestling scene with feuds against teams like The Young Bucks (Nick & Matt Jackson), The Ballard Brothers, "Aerial Xpress" (Scorpio Sky & Quicksilver), and “Arrogance” (Scott Lost & Chris Bosh).

In 2006 Los Luchas was entered into the Copa de Lucha tournament for NWA Pro Wrestling in Las Vegas, Nevada. Representing Mexico, they upset the favored Japanese representatives Black Tiger and Puma in the first round. In the finals they beat the American team of Joey Ryan and Karl Anderson which began a feud between the two teams that lasted nearly two years. The return match in Las Vegas at the Fiesta Lucha event was a Flag Match that saw Ryan and Anderson (now known as “The Real American Heroes”) align themselves with Adam Pearce and his manager C. Edward Vander Pyle.

Los Luchas and The Real American Heroes faced off in Cage Matches, First Blood Matches and more at events in Phoenix, Arizona, Hammond, Indiana, Kissimmee, Florida and throughout Texas and California. During this time Anderson and Ryan captured the NWA World Tag Team Championship left vacant after the National Wrestling Alliance ended its licensing agreement with TNA Wrestling. After several attempts, Los Luchas captured the titles on February 10, 2008 in Las Vegas.

After losing the championship to the Skullkrushers (Keith Walker & Rasche Brown) on October 4, 2008 in Robstown, Texas, Los Luchas took a brief hiatus from wrestling. They returned recently to full-time action including entering the 16 team tournament for the Mach One Wrestling Tag Team Championship.

=== Global Force Wrestling (2015) ===
On July 24, 2015, Los Luchas debuted for Global Force Wrestling working two matches at the first GFW Amped taping in Las Vegas. They were on the winning side of a Lucha six man tag match and lost a tag match to Reno Scum At the second set of GFW Amped taping's in Las Vegas, Los Luchas teamed with Sonjay Dutt to take on P. J. Black and The Akbars.

== Championships and accomplishments ==
- Alternative Wrestling Show
  - AWS Tag Team Champions (1 time)
- Empire Wrestling Federation
  - EWF Tag Team Championship (1 time)
- International Wrestling Association
  - IWA World Cruiserweight Championship (1 time) – Phoenix Star
- National Wrestling Alliance
  - NWA World Tag Team Championship (1 time)
- NWA Pro Wrestling
  - Copa De Lucha Tournament Winner (2006)
- Oddity Wrestling Alliance
  - OWA Tag Team Championship (1 time)
- Pro Wrestling Revolution
  - PWR Tag Team Championship (1 time, current)
- United Independent Wrestling Alliance
  - UIWA Tag Team Championship (1 time, current)
