= Joey Ryan =

American inactive professional wrestler

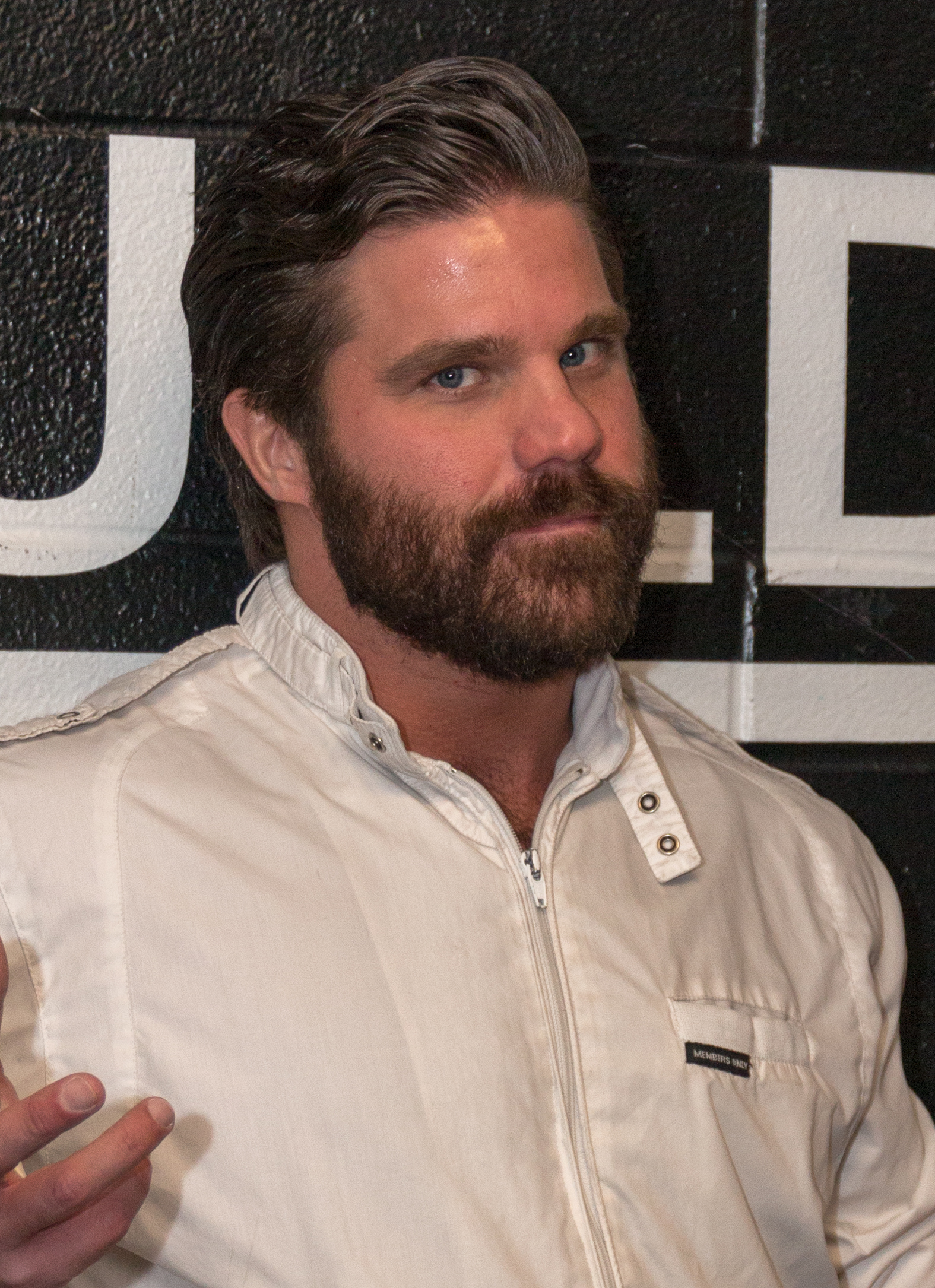
- Ryan in 2016

Personal information
- Born: Joseph Ryan Meehan; November 7, 1979 (age 47) Los Angeles, California, U.S.
- Spouse: Laura James (m. 2016; div. 2019)

Professional wrestling career
- Ring name(s): Stardong; Chase Walker; Forsaken; Joey Blalock; Joey Hollywood; Joey Ryan; Joey Shadow; Juicy Joey; Joseph P. Ryan
- Billed height: 5 ft 10 in (1.78 m)
- Billed weight: 222 lb (101 kg)
- Billed from: Hollywood, California
- Trained by: Bobby Bradley; Bryan Danielson; Tom Howard; Brian Kendrick; Inoki Dojo
- Debut: September 1, 2000

Joseph Ryan Meehan (born November 7, 1979), is an American actor, writer, producer, former professional wrestler, and promoter.

During his early years as a professional wrestler, he founded the Southern California promotion Pro Wrestling Guerrilla (PWG) with five other wrestlers, where he held the PWG World and PWG World Tag Team Championships. He later appeared on the independent circuit, wrestling for promotions such as Ring of Honor, Wrestling Society X, Major League Wrestling and DDT Pro-Wrestling (where he held the Ironman Heavymetalweight Championship 43 times). Ryan also wrestled for the TV series Lucha Underground, Impact Wrestling and the National Wrestling Alliance (NWA), becoming NWA World Tag Team Champion with Karl Anderson in the latter. In NWA Championship Wrestling from Hollywood, Ryan served as head booker, and he was the promoter of Bar Wrestling. He was known for using his penis as part of his moves, most notably, the YouPorn-Plex.

During the Speaking Out movement in June 2020, multiple women publicly alleged sexual misconduct against Meehan and he was subsequently released from his TNA contract. Meehan has denied the allegations and filed lawsuits against some of the women for defamation and Impact Wrestling for not performing a contractually obligated investigation.

== Professional wrestling career ==
=== Training and early years (2000–2006) ===
Meehan is the youngest of four brothers and he remembers watching WrestleMania 2 live with his family when he was six years old. After seeing Jake Roberts use his snake on his opponent, Meehan became emotionally invested in wrestling. His favourite wrestlers growing up were Hulk Hogan, Ricky Steamboat and the British Bulldogs. However, he stopped watching wrestling in early adolescence until the mid 1990s, because his school friends were fans. When WWF came to a live event he and his friends were attending in Anaheim, a man gave them tickets to an independent wrestling show. After attending that show, he decided to train. Meehan started his professional wrestling training in February 2000 with Jesse Hernandez's Empire Wrestling Federation in San Bernardino, CA under Bobby Bradley. During this time, Ryan (billed as Joey Shadow) was part of a gothic stable called The Underworld, teaming with fellow trainees Sid Shadow, The Nomad and Stitches. He then went on to Rick Bassman's Ultimate Pro Wrestling in 2001 in Huntington Beach, CA and later El Segundo, CA where he trained under Tom Howard and Brian Kendrick to whom he credits with most of his training. He returned to training in 2004 at the Inoki Dojo in Santa Monica, CA under Bryan Danielson.

During his early years, Ryan became a regular at many southern California promotions including EWF and UPW where he trained, as well as Revolution Pro Wrestling where he had his first matches against Super Dragon and also competed against Mike Quackenbush and had his first inter-gender matches with Sara Del Rey. His first national exposure came when he was brought into Gary Yap's EPIC Pro Wrestling where he has matches against Xtreme Pro Wrestling (XPW) alum The Messiah, Frankie Kazarian and Brian Kendrick on high profiled cards featuring names like Sabu, New Jack, Vampiro, Christopher Daniels, Samoa Joe and Bryan Danielson.

After training at the Inoki Dojo, Ryan received his first television exposure from NJPW-USA Toukon Fighting Spirit. Although mostly used as an enhancement talent, he was able to get exposure by competing in matches against Bryan Danielson with CM Punk on commentary. On May 19, 2006, he competed in The Best of American Super Juniors Tournament, however losing to Roderick Strong in the first round.

=== Pro Wrestling Guerrilla ===
==== The X-Foundation (2003–2004) ====
Joey Ryan is one of the six founders of SoCal promotion Pro Wrestling Guerrilla, collectively known as the "PWG Six". PWG was formed when the founders grew tired of arguing with promoters, feeling they knew more about the inner workings of professional wrestling and could therefore promote and book shows more effectively. Meehan said that they went in with low expectations, never exceeding more than one show but if enough money was attained, the production of a second show would be the goal. He began in PWG as part of the X-Foundation with Funky Billy Kim and "The Professional" Scott Lost. They teamed together at PWG's first show, losing to the team of Adam Pearce, Hardcore Kidd, and Al Katrazz. Ryan then took part in the Bad Ass Mother 3000 tournament to determine the first PWG Champion. Ryan made it to the finals, but lost to Frankie Kazarian.

Ryan then teamed with Scott Lost in the Tango & Cash Invitational tournament for the PWG Tag Team Championship. They made it to the semi-finals, but lost to Super Dragon and American Dragon. Ryan and Lost won the titles at the next show by defeating inaugural champions Homicide and B-Boy, but lost them in their first defense against Quicksilver and Chris Bosh. Ryan continued teaming with the X-Foundation, and regained the tag team titles with Scott Lost on June 19, 2004, at Rocktoberfest. Problems began within the X-Foundation, leading to a ladder match between Joey Ryan and Scott Lost for the titles. Scott Lost won the match and chose Chris Bosh as his new partner. At Use Your Illusion 4, Ryan lost a 60 Minute Iron Man match to Super Dragon.

==== PWG World Champion and The Dynasty (2005–2012) ====
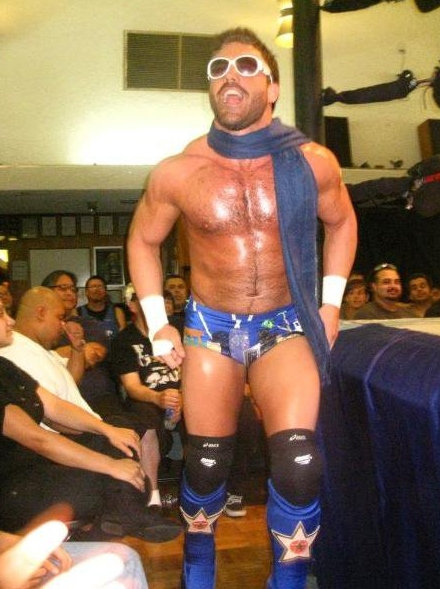
Joey Ryan at PWG

After a brief absence, Ryan began teaming with Scott Lost and Chris Bosh, leading to uncertainty over his actions. He would then set out to prove that he is the best technical wrestler. He challenged and defeated wrestlers known for their great technical skills, such as Alex Shelley, Claudio Castagnoli, Rocky Romero, and Chris Hero. Though he won the matches, Ryan had to cheat and use help from Lost or Bosh to win, since he would usually be outwrestled each match. On December 3, 2005, at Chanukah Chaos (The C's Are Silent), Joey Ryan beat Kevin Steen for the PWG Championship after Super Dragon, who was feuding with the champion, gave Steen two Psycho Drivers. He made his first defense at CZW's Cage of Death 7 against El Generico. Ryan began defeating a number of wrestlers using some under handed tactic or a sheer stroke of luck on his behalf. It was around this time that Ryan changed his appearance to resemble Tom Selleck from Magnum, P.I., which included a big moustache. He even changed his finisher name from the Duff Drop to the Moustache Ride. Some of the wrestlers he has defeated include Chris Kanyon, Human Tornado, Chris Bosh, A.J. Styles, Emil Sitoci, Jonny Storm, Kevin Steen, Chris Sabin, Super Dragon, Necro Butcher, Frankie Kazarian, Davey Richards, and B-Boy. Ryan became at the time the longest reigning champion, and made the title a world championship in the process by defending it in Europe.

He went on to form a stable known as The Dynasty, consisting of himself, Scorpio Sky, Scott Lost, and Chris Bosh. The four screwed the then PWG World Tag Team Champs Super Dragon and Davey Richards, ending their dominant reign as tag champs. Ryan would proceed to give Super Dragon a Moustache Ride through two tables, putting him on the shelf. After holding the PWG World Championship for a little over a year, winning usually due to cheating and interference, Ryan lost the title to Human Tornado in a Guerrilla Warfare match on January 13, 2007, at Based on a True Story. On January 27, 2008, Ryan and Scott Lost were awarded the PWG World Tag Team Championship after the titles were stripped off Super Dragon and Davey Richards. They eventually lost the belts to El Generico and Kevin Steen on March 21 at 1.21 Gigawatts. During the summer of 2009, Ryan attempted to stop Chris Hero's reign as the PWG World Champion in order to retain his record as the longest reigning PWG World Champion in history, but after he failed to regain the title in two separate title matches, Hero broke Ryan's record on August 17, 2009. Shortly afterwards Ryan turned face and on September 5, entered the 2010 Battle of Los Angeles, defeating Chuck Taylor in his first round match. The following night Ryan defeated Austin Aries and Claudio Castagnoli to advance to the finals, where he defeated Chris Hero to win the 2010 Battle of Los Angeles. After his win, Ryan dubbed himself "The Hollywood Submission Machine" and adopted a new submission finishing maneuver, the End Scene. When Davey Richards was after the tournament stripped of the PWG World Championship, Ryan and the three other Battle of Los Angeles semi-finalists, Brandon Gatson, Chris Hero and Claudio Castagnoli, were placed in a four-way match to determine a new champion. On October 9, 2010, at The Curse of Guerrilla Island, Ryan failed in his attempt to regain the PWG World Championship, when he was defeated by Claudio Castagnoli. Ryan received a one–on–one shot at the PWG World Championship on April 9, 2011, but was again defeated by Castagnoli. Afterwards, Ryan began regularly teaming with the returning Scorpio Sky and on August 20, the two defeated the RockNES Monsters (Johnny Goodtime and Johnny Yuma) to become the number one contenders to the PWG World Tag Team Championship. On September 10, Ryan and Sky failed to capture the PWG World Tag Team Championship from The Young Bucks (Matt and Nick Jackson). After signing a contract with Total Nonstop Action Wrestling (TNA), Ryan wrestled his PWG farewell match on December 1, 2012, where he was defeated by Scorpio Sky.

==== The World's Cutest Tag Team (2013–2015) ====
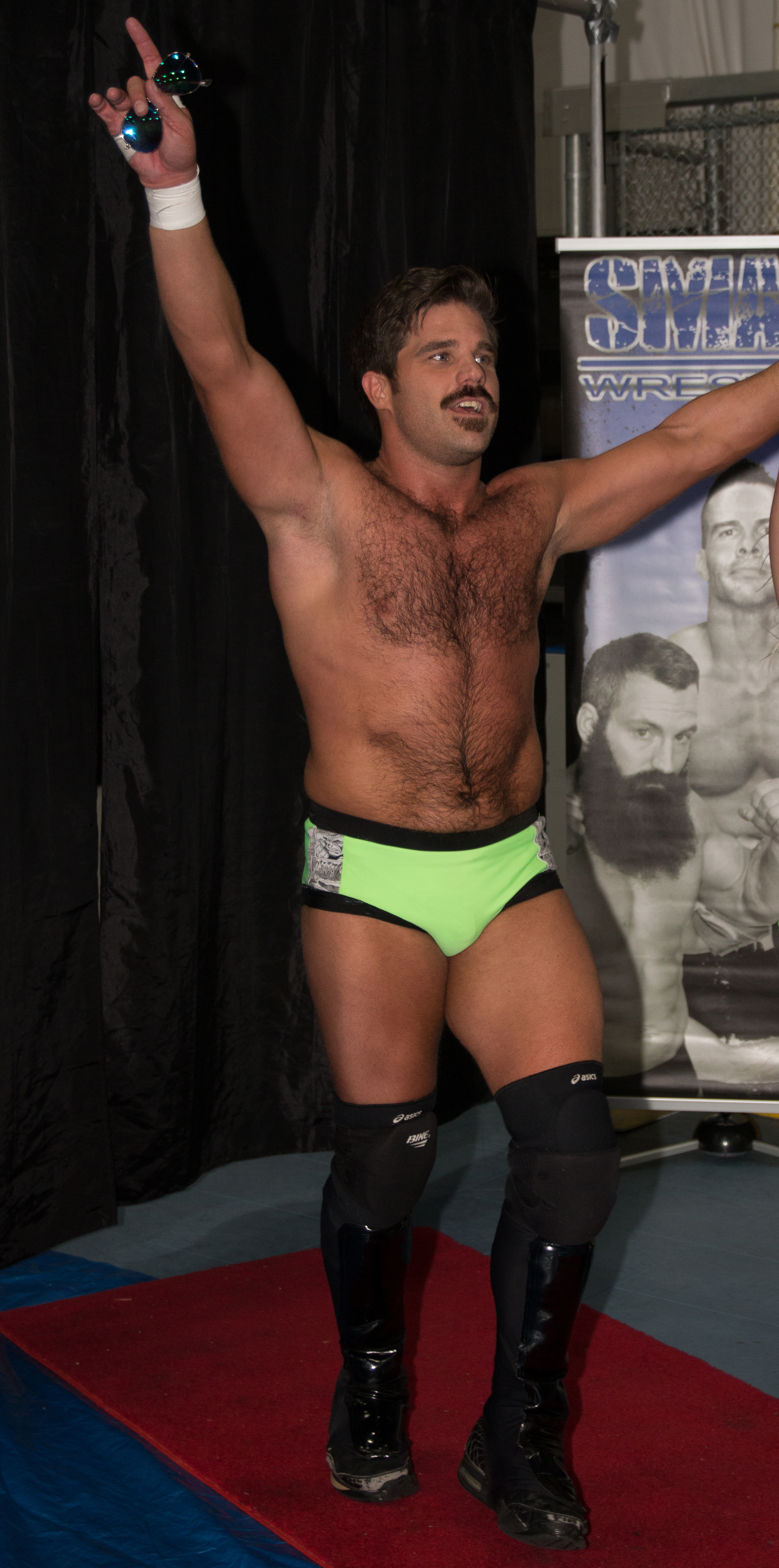
Ryan in November 2014

Following his release from TNA, Ryan returned to PWG at the promotion's tenth anniversary event on August 9, 2013, teaming with Peter Avalon and Ryan Taylor in a six-person opener, where they were defeated by B-Boy, Candice LeRae and Willie Mack. On August 30, Ryan entered the 2013 Battle of Los Angeles, but was eliminated from the tournament in his first round match by Drake Younger. The following day, Ryan formed the Best Friends stable with Chuck Taylor and Trent? as the three defeated B-Boy, Tommaso Ciampa and Willie Mack in a six-man tag team match. Ryan also formed a partnership with Candice LeRae, which led to the two unsuccessfully challenging The Young Bucks for the PWG World Tag Team Championship on October 19.

On July 27, 2014, Ryan and LeRae defeated The Young Bucks in a Guerrilla Warfare match to become the new PWG World Tag Team Champions. They lost the title to Monster Mafia (Ethan Page and Josh Alexander) on May 22, 2015, in the opening round of the 2015 DDT4.

=== WWE appearances (2005, 2011, 2013) ===
Ryan has appeared in several matches as enhancement talent for the World Wrestling Entertainment (WWE), competing against Rosey, Sylvan, The Gymini, Mark Henry, John Morrison, Super Crazy and two times against Big Show. On August 14, 2011, Ryan made an appearance at SummerSlam, portraying a fan during a match between Mark Henry and Sheamus. Two days later, Ryan wrestled a dark match at the SmackDown tapings in Bakersfield, California, losing to Bo Rotunda.

=== Wrestling Society X (2006–2007) ===
Wrestling Society X (WSX) was a short-lived professional wrestling-based television series produced in 2006 by Big Vision Entertainment. The weekly television series formerly aired on MTV, MTV2, MTV Tr3s, and over a dozen other MTV outlets throughout the world. WSXtra, an extra program featuring WSX matches and interviews not broadcast on television, was available on the promotion's MTV website and Video on Demand. Ryan was featured in a team with Disco Machine and together they formed That 70's Team. The duo instantly became cult favorites of the fans of the show. Ryan is most noted for his applying of baby oil, use of his inhaler and getting his wrestling trunks pulled down revealing his thong underwear all while in the ring during the show. The team is featured on episode 2 against Team Dragon Gate (Masato Yoshino and Genki Horiguchi), on episode 3 against D.I.F.H. (Jimmy Jacobs and Tyler Black), on episode 4 against Ruckus and Babi Slymm, on episode 6 against D.I.F.H. (Jimmy Jacobs and Tyler Black), on episode 8 against Trailer Park Boys (Nate Webb and Josh Raymond) and Quicksilver & Matt Classic and on episode 9 against D.I.F.H. (Jimmy Jacobs and Tyler Black).

=== National Wrestling Alliance (2006–2012) ===
In 2006, Ryan began regularly working for David Marquez's NWA brand, teaming with Karl Anderson to form The Real American Heroes. Ryan and Anderson entered into the Copa de Lucha tournament for the NWA in Las Vegas, Nevada representing America and reaching the finals before losing to the Mexico team of Los Luchas which began a feud between the two teams that lasted nearly two years. The return match in Las Vegas at the Fiesta Lucha event was a Flag Match that saw Ryan and Anderson align themselves with Adam Pearce and his manager C. Edward Vander Pyle. The Real American Heroes and Los Luchas faced off in Cage Matches, First Blood Matches and more at events in Phoenix, Arizona, Hammond, Indiana, Kissimmee, Florida and throughout Texas and California. At times, The Real American Heroes incited near riots from the crowds, most notably in Las Vegas, NV and in Houston, TX. On July 7, 2007, Ryan and Anderson defeated the teams of Billy Kidman and Sean Waltman and Sicodelico Jr. and Incognito to become the first post-TNA-era NWA World Tag Team Champions. After several attempts, Los Luchas captured the titles away from Ryan and Anderson on February 10, 2008, in Las Vegas. Soon after losing the titles, Anderson began working full-time for New Japan Pro-Wrestling and Ryan went on as a singles competitor in the NWA. He has had multiple shots at the NWA World Heavyweight Championship facing off against the likes of Blue Demon Jr., Adam Pearce and Colt Cabana only to fall short each time. In 2010, he was a part of the launch of NWA Championship Wrestling from Hollywood and heavily featured with standout matches against T. J. Perkins and Scorpio Sky. In early 2011, he took over booking for the TV show which lasted until August when he had a falling out and left the company. He returned to the company in late 2011. In 2012, Ryan seemingly rejoined the tag team ranks in the NWA by forming an alliance with Johnny Goodtime.

=== Independent circuit (2008–2020) ===
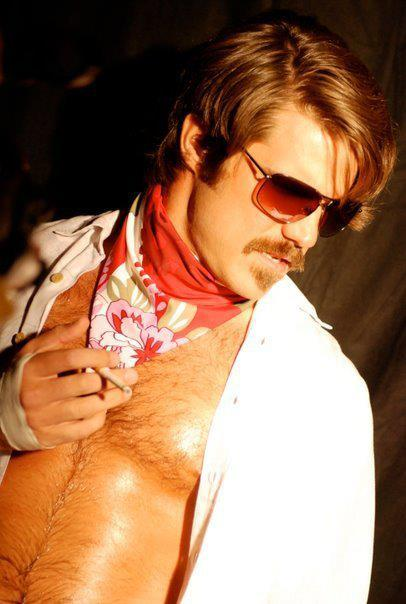
Ryan in 2009

Joey Ryan is a well traveled veteran of the independent scene and along with those mentioned above, he has also made multiple appearances for such promotions as Revolution Pro Wrestling (Rev Pro), All Pro Wrestling (APW), Combat Zone Wrestling (CZW), Independent Wrestling Association Mid-South (IWA-MS), Chikara, Anarchy Championship Wrestling (ACW), Xtreme Pro Wrestling (XPW), Full Impact Pro (FIP), Mach One Wrestling (M1W), International Wrestling Cartel (IWC), Juggalo Championship Wrestling (JCW), Pro Wrestling Bushido and more. In 2008, Joey Ryan became an instructor at Rick Bassman's Ultimate University, the wrestling school for Ultimate Pro Wrestling (UPW). Ryan was brought in as an assistant trainer on the CMT television series Hulk Hogan's Celebrity Championship Wrestling. In 2009, he became a trainer at Mach One Wrestling's Wrestling 101. Ryan has also become a staple at Lucha Va Voom, a hybrid variety show of wrestling, burlesque dancing and comedy based out of Los Angeles. In addition to their regular Los Angeles shows, he has toured the country with the company including Chicago, New York, Boston, Baltimore, Seattle among other stops. Ryan plays a variation of his "Magnum" character but uses Rupert Holmes' "Escape (The Piña Colada Song)" as his entrance music and smokes cigarettes during matches and applies baby oil to his body before he competes. In 2011, Ryan was featured as a trainer on RuPaul's Drag Race Season 4, Episode 2. In October 2011, Meehan took part in the first season tapings of Wrestling Retribution Project (WRP), where he performed as Chase Walker, with actress Trish LaFache as his valet. Meehan traveled to India in late 2011 and early 2012 to take part in Ring Ka King, which was created by Jeff Jarrett and backed by Total Nonstop Action Wrestling, where Dave Lagana (both worked in CWFH and ROH) worked. In the promotion he performed as Joey Hollywood, often teaming with Tony Broadway. On July 28, 2012, Ryan participated in a Vendetta Pro Wrestling event in Lompoc, California, participating in the main event for the vacant Vendetta Pro Heavyweight title, losing to Chavo Guerrero Jr. On December 7, 2012, he lost the EWF Heavyweight Championship to Brandon Gaston.

On July 21, 2013, Ryan returned to Championship Wrestling from Hollywood (now, outside NWA) as the CWFH International Television Championship (also MAV Television Championship). On November 3, 2013, Ryan defeated Drake Younger to retain the title. Ryan lost the title against Ryan Taylor on May 11, 2014. However, he regained the title at Red Carpet Rumble on June 15, 2014. on June 14, 2014, at House of Hardcore 6, Ryan defeated Tommasco Ciampa.

On June 21, 2015, Ryan traveled to Australia, where he competed in an 8-man tournament for the Queensland Wrestling Alliance to crown the QWA Global Champion, which Ryan won.

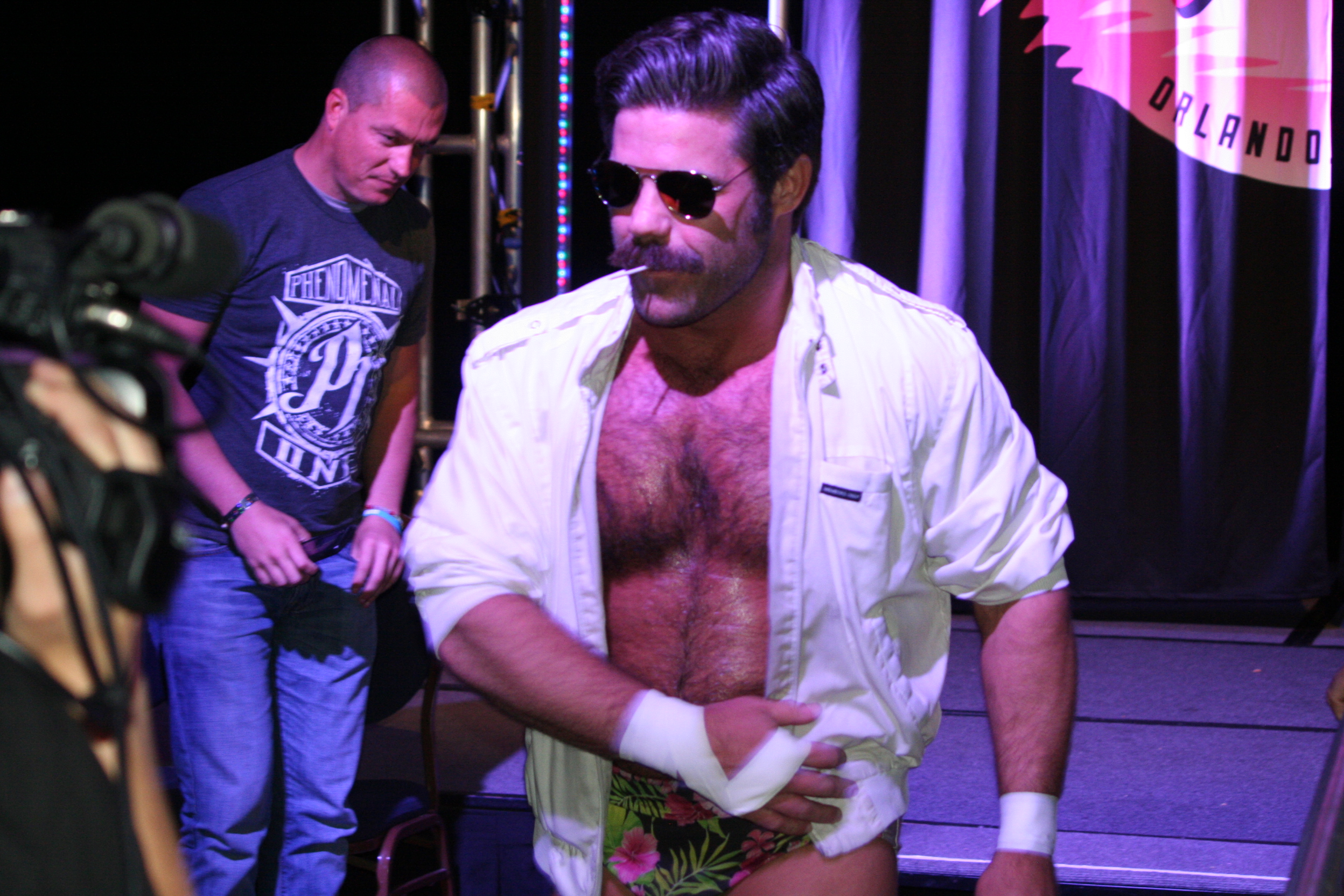
Ryan in April 2016

On September 19, 2015, Ryan made his Japanese debut for the DDT Pro-Wrestling promotion, defeating Tomomitsu Matsunaga. During his tour of DDT, Ryan took part in a comedy spot, where he used his penis to overpower Danshoku Dino. Video of the spot went viral and led to Ryan being featured on the New York Daily News, Rolling Stone and Vice, while also getting him a sponsorship deal with YouPorn Sports. Ryan returned to DDT in May 2016, winning the comedic Ironman Heavymetalweight Championship, which he then took on an extended tour of the United States, losing and winning it multiple times over the following months. When Ryan returned to Japan in August 2016, he was a 22-time Ironman Heavymetalweight Champion. He has since won the title multiple times, including once on March 20, 2017, at Judgement 2017: DDT 20th Anniversary. In March 2017, Ryan brought the title back to the United States for a tour.

Ryan founded his own promotion, Bar Wrestling, in 2017.

On April 5, 2019, Ryan hosted a WrestleCon-branded show called Joey Ryan's Penis Party.

On November 10, 2019, Ryan won the vacant Kansas Wrestling Revolution Championship by defeating King Money in the main event of "Wrestleversary" The promotion's one year anniversary show. During the match Ryan flipped 7 people (One Percent members, King Money, Merrick McMichaels, Havoc, The Outlaw, Prince Mahalli, Colt Killbane, and Trixie) using his signature move "The Dick Flip".

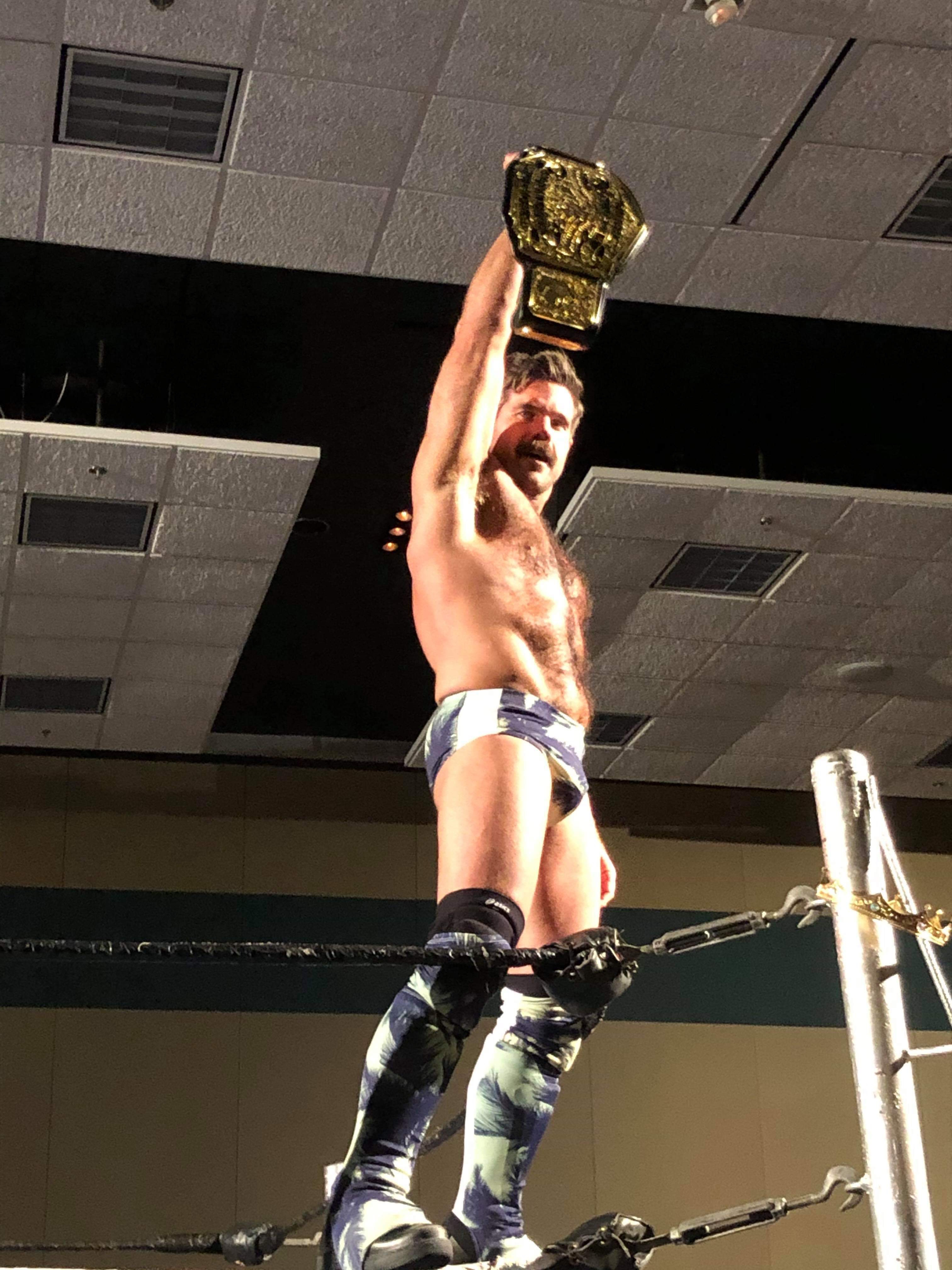
Ryan after winning the KWR Championship November 2019

=== Ring of Honor (2009–2010) ===
In April 2009, Ryan appeared in several ROH Video Wires, promoting his debut. Ryan made his official debut as a part of The Embassy on May 9, teaming with Jimmy Rave and Claudio Castagnoli to defeat Brent Albright, Colt Cabana and Erick Stevens. He made his first appearance on Ring of Honor Wrestling television on September 18, losing to Cabana. Ryan would then go on to defeat Roderick Strong in his second match on ROH on HDNet, with help from Prince Nana. He would go on to feud with Colt Cabana and on several occasions join fellow Embassy member Claudio Castagnoli battling against his rival Brent Albright. Ryan would eventually begin a rivalry with Necro Butcher including a No Disqualification match on November 6, 2009. During his feud with Necro Butcher, Erick Stevens would turn heel and join The Embassy and Ryan and Stevens would be frequently featured as a team in tag team matches. The Ryan and Stevens duo faced teams such as Briscoe Brothers and Player Uno and Player Dos but their most prolific matches came against the team of Necro Butcher and Eddie Kingston including a Street Fight at the 8th anniversary show on February 13, 2010.

=== Total Nonstop Action Wrestling (2012–2013) ===
After Ring Ka King, his friend Dave Lagana presented him to Al Snow and Bruce Prichard, who decided to use him in Gut Check. On May 24, 2012, Ryan made an appearance on Total Nonstop Action Wrestling's (TNA) Impact Wrestling television program, losing to Austin Aries in a Gut Check Challenge. The following week, the Gut Check judges decided not to sign Ryan to a TNA contract based on his performance. Before the match, Hulk Hogan and Eric Bischoff told him that they like him and he want to use him in the future. He was a heel in the promo and insulted Taz, who was upset due to his attitude. Ryan returned to TNA on the June 28 episode of Impact Wrestling, interrupting Taeler Hendrix's Gut Check evaluation, before being escorted out of the arena. On the July 3 edition of Vendetta Pro Wrestling's "Vendetta Pro Radio", Ryan was a guest host, when he was confronted live on air by TNA Gut Check judge Taz. Ryan made his next appearance on July 26, punching Gut Check judge Al Snow during another Gut Check Challenge match. Ryan again appeared on the August 30 episode of Impact Wrestling, confronting Snow with a megaphone and throwing a drink in his face, before being chased out of the building. Ryan and Snow had another confrontation the following week, which ended with Snow slapping Ryan. On the October 4 episode of Impact Wrestling, Ryan met Snow in the ring and received an apology for the slap, before signing what he thought was a TNA contract. Snow then revealed that Ryan had actually signed a contract for a match between the two at Bound for Glory.

On October 14 at Bound for Glory, Ryan defeated Snow, following interference from Matt Morgan, to earn a TNA contract. On the October 25 episode of Impact Wrestling, Ryan and Morgan entered the ring, after Rob Van Dam had successfully defended the TNA X Division Championship against Zema Ion, with Morgan hitting him with the Carbon Footprint, after which Ryan posed with his title belt. The following week, Ryan defeated Van Dam in a non-title match with help from Morgan. On November 11 at Turning Point, Ryan unsuccessfully challenged Van Dam for the X Division Championship. On December 9 at Final Resolution, Ryan and Morgan unsuccessfully challenged Chavo Guerrero Jr. and Hernandez for the TNA World Tag Team Championship, after losing to them via disqualification. Ryan and Morgan challenged Guerrero and Hernandez again on January 13, 2013, at Genesis, but were again unsuccessful in winning their titles. After not being seen for several weeks, Ryan returned on March 10 at Lockdown, losing to Joseph Park in a singles match. On July 3, 2013, Ryan was released from his contract, along with several other TNA talents including Crimson, Madison Rayne and Christian York.

=== Lucha Underground (2015–2019) ===
On December 14, 2015, it was announced that Ryan signed with Lucha Underground and would appear on the show's second season. His character was introduced as an undercover Los Angeles police officer, and the new partner of fellow undercover officer Cortez Castro (although their cover will be that they are enemies). He lost his debut match on the February 17, 2016 episode of Lucha Underground against Cage. On the May 25 episode of Lucha Underground, Ryan defeated Mascarita Sagrada. During the third season, Ryan allied himself with Dario Cuerto, revealing Castro is a cop. They started a feud, ending in a Police match with an Aztec Medallion on the line. During season 4, Ryan turned face and worked with Ivelisse and Sonny Kiss. He was released on March 26, 2019.

=== Return to TNA / Impact Wrestling (2019–2020) ===
On October 21, 2019, Ryan re-signed with TNA, now known as Impact Wrestling, after appearing in the Bound for Gold gauntlet match at Bound for Glory. During the following months, he started a stable with Rob Van Dam and Keira Forbes called Cancel Culture, changing his ring name to Joseph P Ryan.

On June 22, 2020, it was announced that Ryan's contract with Impact was terminated after multiple women accused Ryan of sexual misconduct during the Speaking Out Movement.

=== Attempted returns (2021, 2025) ===
In March 2021, a poster for an event called Wrestling 4 Women Charity circulated online featuring Ryan and several other wrestlers. It was subsequently revealed that Ryan's Bar Wrestling was involved with promoting the event. All Elite Wrestling (AEW) promoter Tony Khan stated that he would pull the previously allowed AEW talent to appear if Ryan was involved. A Twitter account for the event stated that FITE TV would be airing the show, however despite an email confirming their participation, FITE TV denied that they were carrying the event. Facing pressures and attacks from social media, the account subsequently issued an apology, cancelled the event and it was subsequently deleted. Ryan denied that he was "trying to come back to wrestling" and said he had been asked to "wrestle a good friend as a way to go out and gain some closure". He is currently not actively wrestling.

In 2025, Ryan was announced to wrestle for a new promotion called Portland Wrestling, but it was cancelled after backlash from fans.

== Professional wrestling style and persona ==
Ryan's wrestling persona was described by the Los Angeles Times as a "macho, mustachioed playboy who wore Speedos and sunglasses." Ryan uses the "YouPorn Plex" as a signature move, a crotch flip with theatrics. The move, also known as the penis flip, sees the opponent grab Ryan's crotch before Ryan supposedly uses his penis to flip them over. Ryan stated on episodes 251 of the Dude Soup podcast that his persona's look is inspired by 1980s characters such as Magnum P.I.

== Personal life ==
In February 2016, Meehan got engaged to his girlfriend, fellow wrestler Laura James, after proposing to her during their intergender match at Finest City Wrestling in San Diego. The couple married in November 2016. Meehan and James separated in October 2018, before filing for divorce in June 2019.

=== Class action lawsuit against Lucha Underground ===
On February 6, 2019, it was reported that Joey Ryan, Ivelisse Vélez, Thunder Rosa and El Hijo del Fantasma (King Cuerno) had collectively filed a class-action lawsuit in California against the El Rey Network and the Baba-G production company behind Lucha Underground. The group claimed that their Lucha Underground contracts were not legal under California law, unfairly restricting their ability to work in their chosen profession. On March 28, 2019, it was reported that the lawsuit was settled with the plaintiffs released from Lucha Underground.

=== Allegations of sexual misconduct ===
In June 2020, a woman accused Meehan of sexual misconduct. After the initial accusation surfaced, Meehan posted a message on his Twitter account, apologizing for the possibility of invading anyone’s personal space. After that message was posted, a number of women posted on Twitter allegations of misconduct or unwanted sexual advances. Though no investigations have ever taken place, wrestlers Joey Janela and Ryan Nemeth (former roommate of Meehan), who previously worked for Meehan at Bar Wrestling, have spoken against Meehan.

Fearing potential backlash, Bar Wrestling's venue, Bootleg Theater, ended their relationship with the company due to the allegations. After Bar Wrestling deactivated their social media accounts, several people told the SoCal Uncensored website the promotion has ceased operations. On June 23, 2020, after facing online pressure, Impact Wrestling announced they terminated his contract as a result of the allegations. Wanting to avoid any collateral damage, he was also edited out of every episode of Being the Elite in which he appeared.

Meehan addressed the allegations in an hour-long video posted on July 18, 2020. He has denied nearly every accusation against him, showing messages between himself and the women which he says shows evidence to dispute the claims made.

On September 24, Meehan filed a multi-million dollar lawsuit against multiple accusers and one journalist for defamation, in which he has stated he has lost upwards of $20,000 a month. The lawsuit includes loss of followers on social media, loss of revenue from various projects, merchandise, wrestling, and various other revenue streams; and multi-million dollar monetary relief. The lawsuit also states that Meehan wants defamatory statements retracted and or deleted. He filed another lawsuit in October, suing Impact Wrestling for $10 million for allegedly breaching his contract by not conducting a standard contractual obligated investigation before firing him after the allegations were made against him. Meehan won a default judgment against one of his accusers on January 20, 2021, but a judge dismissed a lawsuit involving three accusers without prejudice in February due to lack service, meaning Meehan retains the right to file against them again. However, Meehan dropped most of the lawsuits after a judge in one of the cases ruled that the "Plaintiff offers his declaration to show that the entirety of the parties' sexual encounter was consensual. (Meehan Decl., 11 17-24, Exh. 1.) Plaintiff also provides evidence of messages between the parties to show that Defendant made attempts to contact Plaintiff after their encounter to, among other things, see each other again. (Meehan Decl., 11 25-31, Exh. 2-8. Though the proffered evidence may lead to the inference that Defendant was not a victim of sexual abuse by Plaintiff, the evidence is insufficient to show that Defendant acted with actual malice. The fact that Defendant did not attempt to leave during the parties' sexual encounter or attempted to meet Defendant afterwards are insufficient to show actual malice." Meehan then stated that the dismissal of the lawsuit was eye opening for him and that despite different recollections of the events, his accusers have the right to their opinions. The only lawsuit that Meehan intends to pursue is the breach of contract one against Impact.

On March 8, 2021 in a statement released to SoCal Uncensored, Meehan stated that while there was never any police involvement, that after learning about some of his past problematic behavior, he has taken it upon himself to return to the Christian Church that he was raised in and begun attending weekly Twelve-step program meetings both in-person and on Zoom to address his addictions of intrigue and validation and the emotional high he gets from pursuing women.

Meehan worked at Disneyland for three months in a "probationary status" before he was dismissed in June 2022.

== Filmography ==
Year	Title	Role	Notes
2010	Jesse Ventura for President?	Wrestler	Short film
2012	RuPaul's Drag Race	Himself	Episode: "WTF!: Wrestling's Trashiest Fighters"
2014	A-Holes Anonymous	Matt	Episode: “Happy Birthday to Me”
2014	On Your Mark Show with Mark E. Xtreme	Himself	Episode: “Joey Ryan”
2015	Wrestling Isn't Wrestling	American Muscle Guy	Short film
2015	Fuller House	Crazy Chicken	Episode: "The Legend of El Explosivo"
2015	The Mountain Goats "The Legend of Chavo Guerrero"	Wrestler	Music Video
2016	Red Light Diaries	John The John	Episode: "Rapunzel, Rapunzel"
2017	GLOW	Mr. Monopoly	Episode: "Debbie Does Something"
2018	The 5th Quarter	Love	Episode: “Wrestlestock”

== Championships and accomplishments ==
- Alternative Wrestling Show
  - AWS Tag Team Championship (2 times) – with Scott Lost
- Attack! Pro Wrestling
  - Attack! 24/7 Championship (1 time)
- California Wrestling Alliance
  - CWA Tag Team Championship (1 time) – with Scott Lost
- Championship Wrestling from Hollywood
  - CWFH International/MAV Television Championship (2 times)
  - CWFH Heritage Tag Team Championship (1 time) – with Ryan Taylor
- Compound Pro Wrestling
  - ComPro Oklahoma X Division Championship (1 time)
- DDT Pro-Wrestling
  - Ironman Heavymetalweight Championship (43 times)
- Dreamwave Wrestling
  - Dreamwave Tag Team Championship (1 time) – with Candice LeRae
- Laredo Wrestling Alliance
  - LWA United Pure Championship (1 time)
- Empire Wrestling Federation
  - EWF Heavyweight Championship (1 time)
  - Great Goliath Battle Royal (2012)
- Fighting Spirit Pro Wrestling
  - FSP Tag Team Championship (1 time) – with Candice LeRae
- FIST Combat
  - FIST Championship (2 times)
- Hoodslam
  - Intergalactic Tag Team Championship (1 time) – with Shotzi Blackheart
- Insane Wrestling League
  - IWL Anarchy Championship (1 time)
- National Wrestling Alliance
  - NWA World Tag Team Championship (1 time) – with Karl Anderson
- Pacific Coast Wrestling
  - PCW Heavyweight Championship (1 time)
  - PCW MAXimum Championship (1 time)
  - PCW Tag Team Championship (1 time) – with Scott Lost
- Pro Wrestling Magic
  - PWM Dark Arts Championship (1 time)
- Paragon Pro Wrestling
  - PPW Heavyweight Championship (1 time)
- Pro Wrestling Bushido
  - PWB Television Championship (1 time)
  - Warrior's Way Tournament (2011)
- Pro Wrestling Guerrilla
  - PWG World Championship (1 time)
  - PWG World Tag Team Championship (4 times) – with Scott Lost (3) and Candice LeRae (1)
  - Battle of Los Angeles (2010)
- Pro Wrestling Illustrated
  - PWI ranked him No. 120 of the top 500 singles wrestlers in the PWI 500 in 2018
- SoCalUncensored.com
  - Southern California Tag Team of the Year (2002) with Scott Lost
  - Southern California Match of the Year (2004) vs. Super Dragon, October 23, 2004
  - Southern California Wrestler of the Year (2006)
- Queensland Wrestling Alliance
  - QWA Global Championship (1 time, inaugural)
- The Wrestling Revolver
  - Open Invite Scramble Championship (1 time, unrecognized)
- West Coast Wrestling Company
  - WCWC Open World Heavyweight Championship (1 time)
- West Coast Wrestling Connection
  - WCWC Legacy Championship (1 time)
- World Class Wrestling Alliance
  - WCWA California Championship (1 time)
  - WCWA Tag Team Championship (1 time) – with Scott Lost
- World Power Wrestling
  - WPW Cruiserweight Championship (1 time)
  - WPW Hardcore Championship (1 time)
  - WPW Tag Team Championship (1 time) – with Scott Lost
- World Series Wrestling
  - WSW Tag Team Championship (1 time) – with Concrete Davidson
- WrestleCircus
  - WC Sideshow Championship (4 times)
- Kansas Wrestling Revolution
  - KWR Heavyweight Championship (1 time, final)
- World Wrestling Alliance
  - WWA Hardcore Championship (1 time)
