= List of PWG World Champions =

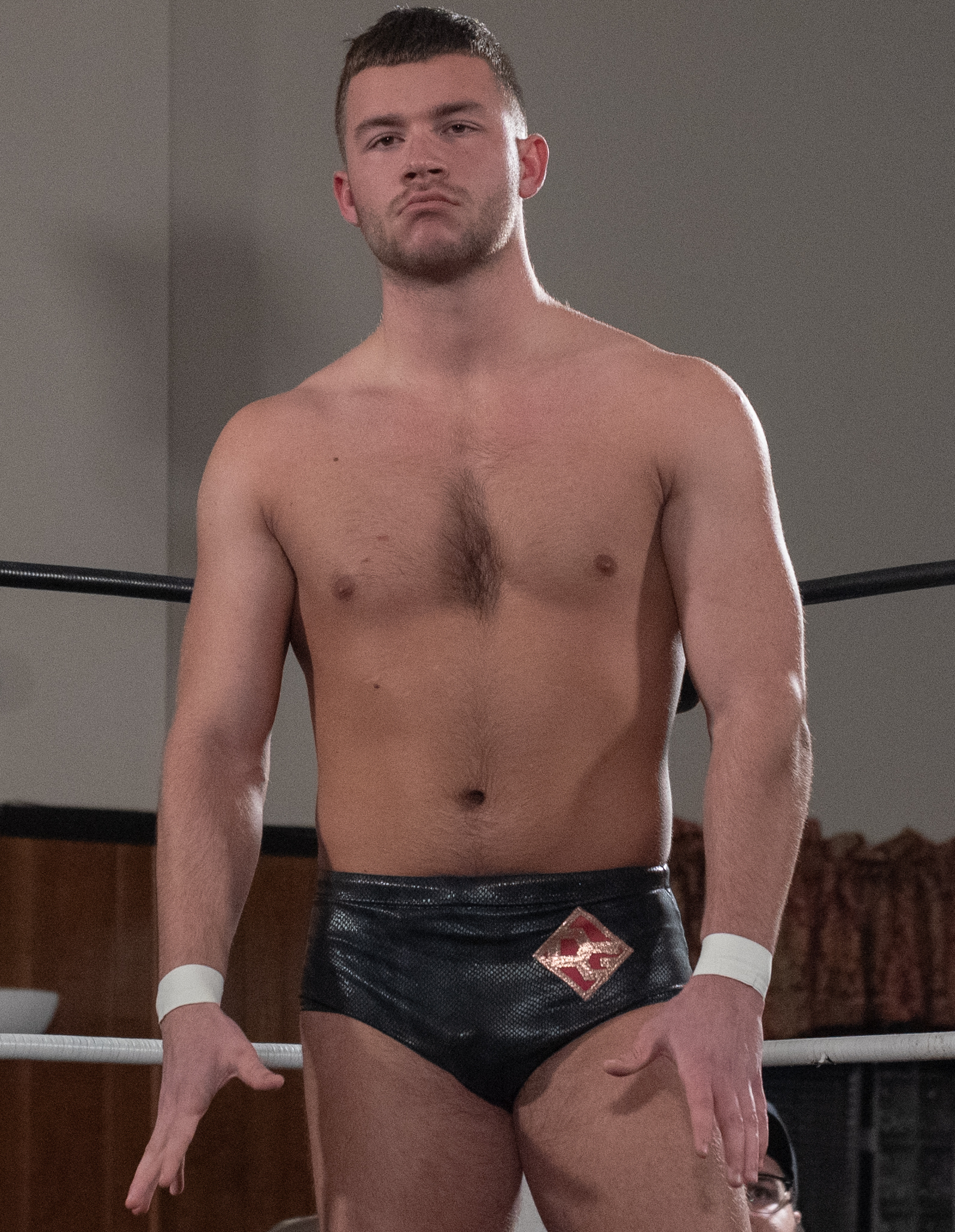
Current and longest reigning champion Daniel Garcia

The PWG World Championship was a professional wrestling world championship owned and copyrighted by Pro Wrestling Guerrilla (PWG). The championship was created and debuted on August 30, 2003, at PWG's Bad Ass Mother 3000 – Stage 2 event. Originally called the PWG Championship, the title was renamed to the PWG World Championship in February 2006 after the title was defended outside the United States for the first and second time—that month, then-champion Joey Ryan defeated Emil Sitoci in Essen, Germany at European Vacation – Germany and Jonny Storm in Orpington, England at European Vacation – England.

The championship was generally contested in professional wrestling matches, in which participants execute scripted finishes rather than contend in direct competition. All reigns are won at live events, which are released on DVD. The inaugural champion was Frankie Kazarian, whom PWG recognized to have become the champion after defeating Ryan in the finals of a 16-man tournament on August 30, 2003, at PWG's Bad Ass Mother 3000 – Stage 2 event. Kevin Steen held the record for most reigns, with three. Bandido's only reign at 863 days was the longest in the title's history. PWG publishes a list of successful championship defenses for each champion on its official website (though this section of the website has not been updated in a few years). Ryan had the most defenses, with 19, while Bryan Danielson and Kenny Omega had the least, with 0.

== Title history ==
=== Names ===
Name	Years
PWG Championship	August 2003 – February 2006
PWG World Championship	February 2006 – November 11, 2023

=== Reigns ===
Key
No.	Overall reign number
Reign	Reign number for the specific champion
Days	Number of days held
Defenses	Number of successful defenses
<1	Reign lasted less than a day
+	Current reign is changing daily

No.	Champion	Championship change			Reign statistics			Notes	Ref.
No.	Champion	Date	Event	Location	Reign	Days	Defenses	Notes	Ref.
1	Frankie Kazarian	August 30, 2003	Bad Ass Mother 3000 – Stage Two	Industry, CA	1	176	4	Kazarian defeated Joey Ryan in the finals of a 16-man tournament to become the first champion.	
2	Adam Pearce	February 22, 2004	Taste the Radness	Santa Ana, CA	1	139	3	This was a Chicago Street Fight.	
3	Frankie Kazarian	July 10, 2004	The Reason for the Season	Los Angeles, CA	2	126	3	This was a Loser Leaves Town steel cage match.	
4	Super Dragon	November 13, 2004	Free Admission (Just Kidding)	Los Angeles, CA	1	140	8		
5	A.J. Styles	April 2, 2005	All Star Weekend – Night Two	Los Angeles, CA	1	126	4		
6	Kevin Steen	August 6, 2005	Zombies [Shouldn't Run]	Los Angeles, CA	1	119	5		
7	Joey Ryan	December 3, 2005	Chanukah Chaos (The C's Are Silent)	Los Angeles, CA	1	406	19	The title was renamed from the "PWG Championship" to the "PWG World Championship" following PWG's European Vacation tour of England and Germany in February 2006.	
8	Human Tornado	January 13, 2007	Based on a True Story	Reseda, Los Angeles, CA	1	42	3	This was a Guerrilla Warfare match.	
9	El Generico	February 24, 2007	Holy Diver Down	Van Nuys, Los Angeles, CA	1	155	9		
10	Bryan Danielson	July 29, 2007	Giant-Size Annual #4	Burbank, CA	1	160	5		
11	Low Ki	January 5, 2008	All Star Weekend 6 – Night One	Van Nuys, Los Angeles, CA	1	32	1		
—	Vacated	February 6, 2008	—	—	—	—	—	The title was vacated due to Low Ki suffering a knee injury while working in Japan.	
12	Human Tornado	February 24, 2008	¡Dia de los Dangerous!	Reseda, Los Angeles, CA	2	133	1	Tornado defeated Karl Anderson and Roderick Strong in the finals of a 5-man tournament to become the champion.	
13	Chris Hero	July 6, 2008	Life During Wartime	Reseda, Los Angeles, CA	1	425	10	This was a Guerrilla Warfare steel cage match.	
14	Bryan Danielson	September 4, 2009	Guerre Sans Frontières	Reseda, Los Angeles, CA	2	<1	0		
—	Vacated	September 4, 2009	Guerre Sans Frontières	Reseda, Los Angeles, CA	—	—	—	The title was vacated due to Bryan Danielson being unable to defend it after signing with WWE.	
15	Kenny Omega	November 21, 2009	Battle of Los Angeles – Night Two	Reseda, Los Angeles, CA	1	98	0	Omega defeated Roderick Strong in the finals of the 2009 Battle of Los Angeles to win the vacant championship.	
16	Davey Richards	February 27, 2010	As the Worm Turns	Reseda, Los Angeles, CA	1	198	2		
—	Vacated	September 13, 2010	—	—	—	—	—	The championship was vacated due to Davey Richards being unable to defend it.	
17	Claudio Castagnoli	October 9, 2010	The Curse of Guerrilla Island	Reseda, Los Angeles, CA	1	287	6	Castagnoli defeated Brandon Gatson, Chris Hero and Joey Ryan in a four–way match to win the vacant championship.	
18	Kevin Steen	July 23, 2011	Eight	Reseda, Los Angeles, CA	2	91	1		
19	El Generico	October 22, 2011	Steen Wolf	Reseda, Los Angeles, CA	2	147	0	This was a ladder match.	
20	Kevin Steen	March 17, 2012	World's Finest	Reseda, Los Angeles, CA	3	259	4	This was a three-way match, also involving Eddie Edwards.	
21	Adam Cole	December 1, 2012	Mystery Vortex	Reseda, Los Angeles, CA	1	538	7	This was a Guerrilla Warfare match.	
22	Kyle O'Reilly	May 23, 2014	Sold Our Soul for Rock 'n Roll	Reseda, Los Angeles, CA	1	203	3	This was a Knockout or Submission Only match.	
23	Roderick Strong	December 12, 2014	Black Cole Sun	Reseda, Los Angeles, CA	1	449	7	This was a Guerrilla Warfare match.	
24	Zack Sabre Jr.	March 5, 2016	All Star Weekend 12 – Night Two	Reseda, Los Angeles, CA	1	489	5		
25	Chuck Taylor	July 7, 2017	Pushin Forward Back	Reseda, Los Angeles, CA	1	106	0		
26	Ricochet	October 21, 2017	All Star Weekend 13 – Night Two	Reseda, Los Angeles, CA	1	83	1		
27	Chuck Taylor	January 12, 2018	Mystery Vortex V	Reseda, Los Angeles, CA	2	70	1	This was a Guerrilla Warfare match.	
28	Keith Lee	March 23, 2018	Time Is a Flat Circle	Los Angeles, CA	1	29	0		
29	Walter	April 21, 2018	All Star Weekend 14 – Night Two	Reseda, Los Angeles, CA	1	181	2	This was a three-way match, also involving Jonah Rock.	
30	Jeff Cobb	October 19, 2018	Smokey and the Bandido	Los Angeles, CA	1	427	3		
31	Bandido	December 20, 2019	The Makings of a Varsity Athlete	Los Angeles, CA	1	863	3		
32	Daniel Garcia	May 1, 2022	Delivering the Goods	Los Angeles, CA	1	559	3		
—	Deactivated	November 11, 2023	—	—	—	—	—	The championship was abandoned then PWG was closed.	

== Combined reigns ==
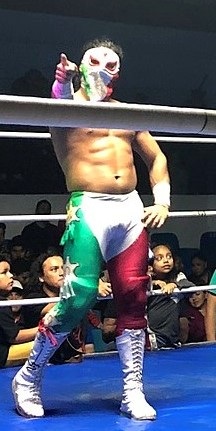
Former longest reigning champion Bandido

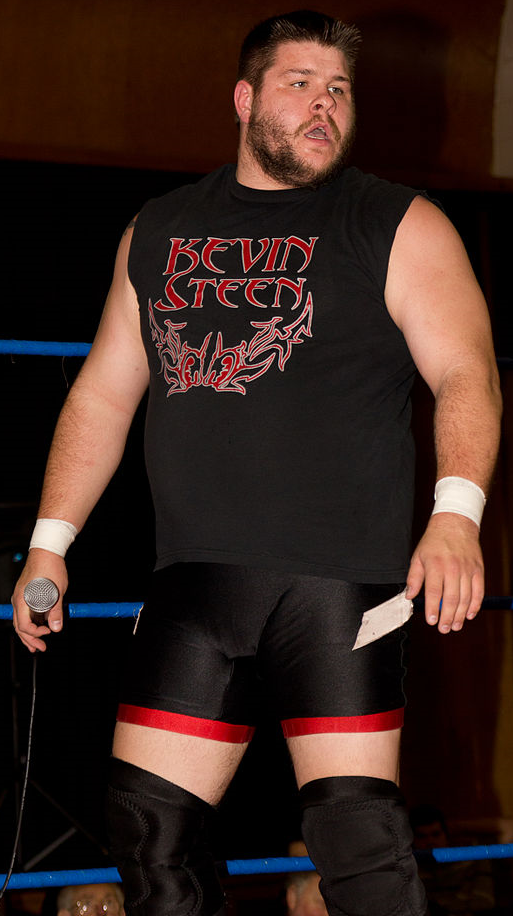
Record three-time champion Kevin Steen

Rank	Wrestler	No. of reigns	Combined defenses	Combined days
1	Bandido	1	3	863
2	Daniel Garcia	1	3	559
3	Adam Cole	1	7	538
4	Zack Sabre Jr.	1	5	489
5	Kevin Steen	3	10	469
6	Roderick Strong	1	7	449
7	Jeff Cobb	1	3	427
8	Chris Hero	1	10	425
9	Joey Ryan	1	19	406
10	El Generico	2	9	302
10	Frankie Kazarian	2	7	302
12	Claudio Castagnoli	1	6	287
13	Kyle O'Reilly	1	3	203
14	Davey Richards	1	2	198
15	Walter	1	2	181
16	Chuck Taylor	2	1	176
17	Human Tornado	2	4	175
18	Bryan Danielson	2	5	160
19	Super Dragon	1	8	140
20	Adam Pearce	1	3	139
21	A.J. Styles	1	4	126
22	Kenny Omega	1	0	98
23	Ricochet	1	1	83
24	Low Ki	1	1	32
25	Keith Lee	1	0	29
