= Oliver John =

American psychologist (born 1959)

Oliver P. John
- Born: February 9, 1959 (age 67)
- Education: University of Oregon
- Known for: Big Five personality traits
- Awards: 2017 Block Award from the Society for Personality and Social Psychology
- Scientific career
- Fields: Personality psychology
- Workplaces: University of California, Berkeley
- Thesis: Direction and type of causal explanations in trait hierarchies (1986)
- Doctoral advisor: Lewis R. Goldberg

Oliver Peter Martin John (born February 9, 1959) is an American personality psychologist and professor of psychology at the University of California, Berkeley. He is known for co-developing the 1998 Big Five Inventory.
