= Adam Pearce =

American professional wrestler (born 1978)

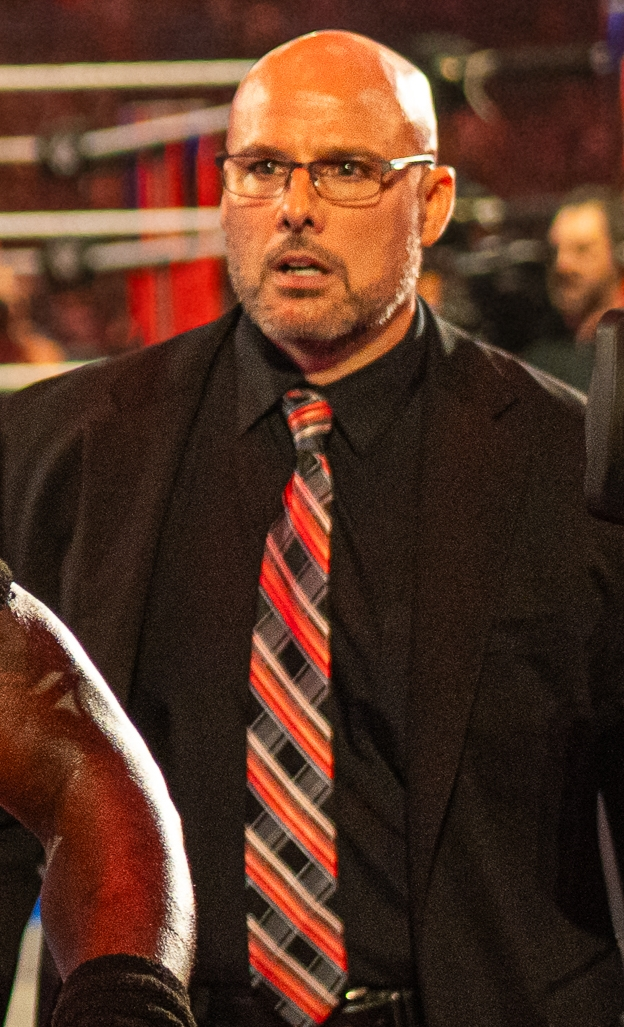
- Pearce in 2026

Personal information
- Born: Adam John Pearce; June 24, 1978 (age 48) Lake Forest, Illinois, U.S.
- Education: University of Phoenix
- Spouse: Sarah Muravez (m. 2002)
- Children: 2

Professional wrestling career
- Ring name(s): Adam O'Brien; Adam Pearce; Masked Spymaster II; U.S. Marshal Adam J. Pearce; Tommy Lee Ridgeway
- Billed height: 6 ft 2 in (188 cm)
- Billed weight: 241 lb (109 kg)
- Billed from: San Diego, California; Chicago, Illinois
- Trained by: Sonny Rogers; Randy Ricci; Ace Steel; Danny Dominion; Inoki Dojo
- Debut: May 16, 1996
- Retired: December 21, 2014

Adam John Pearce (born June 24, 1978) is an American retired professional wrestler. He is signed to WWE as Director of Live Events, producer, trainer, and on-screen general manager of Raw.

Pearce is a former five-time NWA World Heavyweight Champion, NWA British Commonwealth Heavyweight Champion, and PWG World Champion. He is also a member of the NWA Hall of Fame and a former full-time trainer and coach at the WWE Performance Center.

== Early life and training ==
Pearce lettered in both football and baseball at Waukegan High School, in Waukegan, Illinois. Between his junior and senior years, Pearce suffered from acute muscular compartment syndrome in both of his lower legs and underwent surgery. As a result, he had to "pretty much learn how to walk all over again" and he stopped playing sports. During his convalescence, he met professional wrestling trainers Sonny Rogers and Randy Ricci, and began training with them in November 1995.

== Professional wrestling career ==
=== Early career (1996–2000) ===
Pearce had his debut match on May 16, 1996 in Waukegan, Illinois, a few weeks before he graduated from Waukegan High School. Pearce quickly began wrestling for independent professional wrestling promotions, especially in Milwaukee and other cities in Wisconsin. At this time, he also began traveling throughout Michigan with Dave Prazak, and he began working for Dan Curtis's Northern States Wrestling Alliance (NSWA). He was part of the "East Coast Invasion" angle where he had an early breakout match near Thanksgiving 1997 against Reckless Youth. Pearce sided with the local Michigan babyfaces charged with fighting off Youth, Don Montoya, Lance Diamond, and Twiggy Ramirez. A rematch between Pearce and Youth took place in Ian Rotten's Independent Wrestling Association Mid-South (IWA-Mid South) company, where Pearce had captured their IWA Mid-South Light Heavyweight Championship by defeating Cash Flo.

He began wrestling for most notably for Carmine DeSpirito's Mid American Wrestling promotion, and through DeSpirito was booked on a tour of Europe in 1998. Upon his return to the United States, he underwent further training at the Steel Domain Training Center, where he was the first student, under Ace Steel and Danny Dominion. Together Steel, Dominion, and Pearce became regulars in Minnesota, working under the St. Paul Championship Wrestling (later Steel Domain Wrestling) banner. Once again, Pearce's feud with Eaton grabbed headlines as they engaged in a Garbage Can Match. It was one of the first "ECW" style matches in the area. He went on to feud with Danny Dominion over the Northern States TV Title, which was showcased on ex-AWA announcer Mick Karch's weekly TV show, "Slick Mick's Bodyslam Revue". Later, future Domain trainees CM Punk and Colt Cabana debuted in Minnesota and begin their careers under the guidance of Steel, Dominion, and Pearce. Later on, Pearce became a member of the Gold Bond Mafia with CM Punk, Colt Cabana, Dave Prazak, and Chuck E. Smooth.

At the same time, Pearce began working in All-Star Championship Wrestling based in Green Bay, Wisconsin, as the promotion's top babyface and later, top heel. His matches against Dino Bambino were viewed as being among the area's best, and their 1999 Cage Match in Green Bay was voted the 1999 Upper Midwest Match of the Year. Pearce captured the ACW Heavyweight Title by defeating longtime rival Adrian Lynch in Green Bay, and held it until losing to Rob Norwood in a 3-Way-Dance months later. During this time, Pearce also made appearances in Nashville, Tennessee, for Bert Prentice's Music City Wrestling and in Pittsburgh for Norm Connors's Steel City Wrestling.

=== World Wrestling Federation and World Championship Wrestling (1997–1999) ===
Pearce made several World Wrestling Federation (WWF) appearances as enhancement talent as Adam O'Brien, where he was noticed by Terry Taylor. When Taylor moved to World Championship Wrestling (WCW) Pearce was contacted by Paul Orndorff. After attending the WCW Power Plant, Pearce was offered a WCW developmental contract but he declined, as he did not feel that relocating to Atlanta was a viable option for him. After a stint in the short-lived WXO promotion in early 2000, Pearce had another tryout with WCW, but described WCW as being "disorganized and chaotic". Pearce felt "burnt out" and decided to take time off from professional wrestling.

=== Californian independent circuit (2000–2014) ===
After eight months, Pearce returned to wrestling at the urging of both Christopher Daniels and Kevin Kelly. Through Kelly, he met Rick Bassman and began working for Bassman's Ultimate Pro Wrestling (UPW) promotion. In UPW, he was teamed with Aaron Aguilera in a tag team called "Hardkore Inc". Pearce has worked several UPW events, most notably against Diamond Dallas Page at UPW's biggest event, Overload, held in Las Vegas. He also wrestled Chris Masters in Masters's last independent match before being signed by WWF (now WWE).

He also was signed to be a part of the King of Indies 2001 Tournament, promoted by Roland Alexander's All Pro Wrestling (APW). He faced and was defeated in the opening round by Doug Williams. Pearce also competed in IWA-Mid South's 2001 Sweet Science Sixteen, defeating Chris Hero and B. J. Whitmer before losing to Ace Steel. Pearce was generally inactive in a national sense, making sporadic appearances on California independent shows put on by Millennium Pro Wrestling and AWS (both based in Los Angeles) and WCWA (based in San Diego). He also made a few appearances for Mid American Wrestling (based in Milwaukee). This would change when Gary Yap contacted Pearce about the soon-to-be-debuting EPIC promotion. He then signed on to wrestle in EPIC promotion, and after it failed he moved to Pro Wrestling Guerrilla (PWG). He was an early fixture of the promotion, and feuded with Joey Ryan, Aaron Aguilera, and Frankie Kazarian among others. He became the second ever PWG Champion when he defeated Kazarian on February 22, 2004, at Taste the Radness. He was the promotion's first heel champion feuding with Aguilera and Babi Slymm until he lost the title on July 10, 2004, back to Kazarian at PWG's One Year Anniversary Show Reason for the Season in a Steel Cage "Loser Leaves PWG" match.

Pearce was then very active in Southern California, working for Bart Kapitzke's Alternative Wrestling Show, as both wrestler and matchmaker. Many in the SoCal industry credit Pearce's booking as the reason for a huge upswing in AWS's attendance despite the lack of well-known or flown-in talent. Pearce won the AWS Title under a mask as "The Masked Spymaster II", defeating Babi Slymm (The mask of the Masked Spymaster II was later given as a gift to Colt Cabana for his MTV Wrestling Society X character, Matt Classic). Pearce lost the title months later to Human Tornado in a cage match at AWS' Halloween Slaughterhouse II. Shortly thereafter, he began a feud with former tag team partner Aaron Aguilera. The feud advanced and was tied into a huge WarGames cage match in March 2006, where AWS drew their largest attendance to date. The feud ended in July 2006 when Aguilera defeated Pearce in a brutal strap match. Pearce was also very instrumental in early NWA Pro events in the area, serving as the booker and matchmaker.

=== Mexican independents and New Japan (2004–2005) ===
Upon leaving PWG, Pearce almost immediately debuted in Mexico for Promociones XLUM, where he feuded with Venum Black, Extreme Tiger, Nicho el Millonario, and Rey Misterio, Sr. XLUM's premiere event of 2004 entitled Jaulamania drew a sold-out crowd to see El Hijo del Santo on top, while Pearce and his cohorts worked underneath, and ran in on a bloody cage match, attacking Damián 666 and Halloween. Other notable matches included a wild 8-Man-Tag filmed by Fox Sports Español which saw Pearce and his partners (Al Katrazz, Aaron Aguilera, and Jason Allgood) brawl all over the famous Auditorio de Tijuana. Pearce eventually turned babyface, even cutting promos in Spanish as part of his Dusty Rhodes-esque character. Pearce left Mexico when XLUM folded in early 2005.

Pearce also became involved with New Japan Pro-Wrestling's Los Angeles dojo and trained there in addition to being a part of their short-lived television product, Toukon Fighting Spirit, which aired for six weeks in Los Angeles County. Pearce was involved in a storyline with NJPW talent Toru Yano, which eventually led to them tagging as "The Beer and Sake Connection". This led to Pearce's Japanese debut for New Japan Pro-Wrestling on May 15, 2005, at the Tokyo Dome in a dark match against Don Frye's sparring partner, George Castro. Pearce was additionally offered a tour in place of Florida-based wrestler Steve Madison, but was forced to decline due to work obligations.

=== Ring of Honor (2005–2010) ===
In July 2005, Pearce debuted for Full Impact Pro in Florida, facing Sal Rinauro and Azrieal. Pearce credits CM Punk, Cabana, Samoa Joe, Daniels and Steel with receiving a booking in FIP. From FIP, he moved into Ring of Honor (ROH). Pearce appeared at ROH's Glory by Honor IV show in September 2005. At that point, the storyline had him displeased with the way Commissioner Jim Cornette had been treating him, not giving him high-quality matches or title shots.

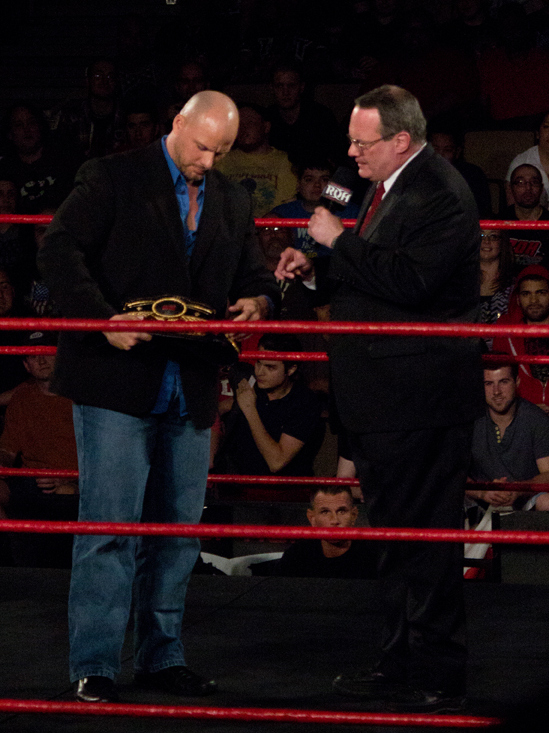
Pearce (left) and Jim Cornette formed an alliance in 2006, with Cornette appointing Pearce the Lieutenant Commissioner of Ring of Honor.

This booking continued until January 2006, when Pearce became involved in ROH's war with Combat Zone Wrestling (CZW) by challenging, and then pulling Necro Butcher over the rail at a show in Cleveland, Ohio. For this feud, Pearce set aside his differences with Cornette and became one of the main ROH wrestlers leading the fight against CZW. Because of Pearce's speaking and promo skills, he was appointed Lieutenant Commissioner of ROH during the storyline to voice Cornette's intentions on ROH events that he could not attend. During the seven month feud, Pearce was a part of many brawls with CZW's Chris Hero and Necro Butcher, and he was part of the match at ROH's 100th show, which saw CZW defeat ROH after Claudio Castagnoli betrayed ROH. Pearce suffered a severe cranial laceration early in the match which required 20 staples to close. At Death Before Dishonor IV on July 15, 2006, Pearce competed in and helped ROH win the 8th Cage of Death match, teaming with Samoa Joe, Ace Steel, B. J. Whitmer, and Bryan Danielson (later replaced by Homicide) to defeat CZW's Chris Hero, Claudio Castagnoli, Necro Butcher, Nate Webb, and Eddie Kingston. Post-match Pearce and J. J. Dillon attacked and handcuffed Homicide to the ring post to allow Cornette to administer a beating. This action elevated Pearce into a main event level feud with Homicide, which began with Pearce turning on former friend and partner, B. J. Whitmer, and siding with a returning Steve Corino. This was pivotal in the Corino versus Homicide feud which saw Homicide team with Samoa Joe to defeat Pearce and Corino at Suffocation. Pearce at this point named ROH School Graduate, Shane Hagadorn, his "man-servant" and the two began working as a tag team.

Pearce's highest level ROH match since Cage of Death also came in a cage against Homicide at The Chicago Spectacular: Night 2, which Pearce lost. Pearce had originally challenged Homicide to the first strap match in ROH history, only to have Homicide rebuke it and throw out the cage challenge. Pearce went on to attack and seemingly cost Homicide his chance at the ROH World Title at Final Battle 2006 in Homicide's match against Bryan Danielson. ROH Senior Officials would have nothing of it and restarted the match, which Homicide eventually won. The feud with Homicide seemingly went to the wayside, as Pearce started interaction with Pelle Primeau and Delirious.

Pearce then formed a stable known as "The Hangmen Three", with B. J. Whitmer, Brent Albright, and Shane Hagadorn. In April 2008 "Sweet N'Sour" Larry Sweeney purchased the contracts of The Hangmen and merged them into Sweet N'Sour Inc. Whitmer balked and was quickly beaten down and kicked out of the group while Albright quit on May 10, 2008. On June 7, 2008, Pearce teamed with Hero and Eddie Edwards in a loss to Brent Albright, Delirious, and Pelle Primeau taped for ROH's Respect is Earned II pay-per-view event. After the match he revealed the NWA World Title to be the item he had been mysteriously carrying in a briefcase and struck Albright in the head with it. This marked the first time ROH recognized Pearce as NWA Champion since he had won the title in September 2007. On June 27, 2008, in Dayton, Ohio, Pearce defeated ROH World Champion Nigel McGuinness via disqualification in a Title vs. Title match. Originally McGuinness had pinned Pearce to win his NWA World Title but the decision was reversed when the NWA's Over The Top Rule was enforced and since Pearce had been thrown over the top rope, McGuinness was disqualified and both men retained their championships.

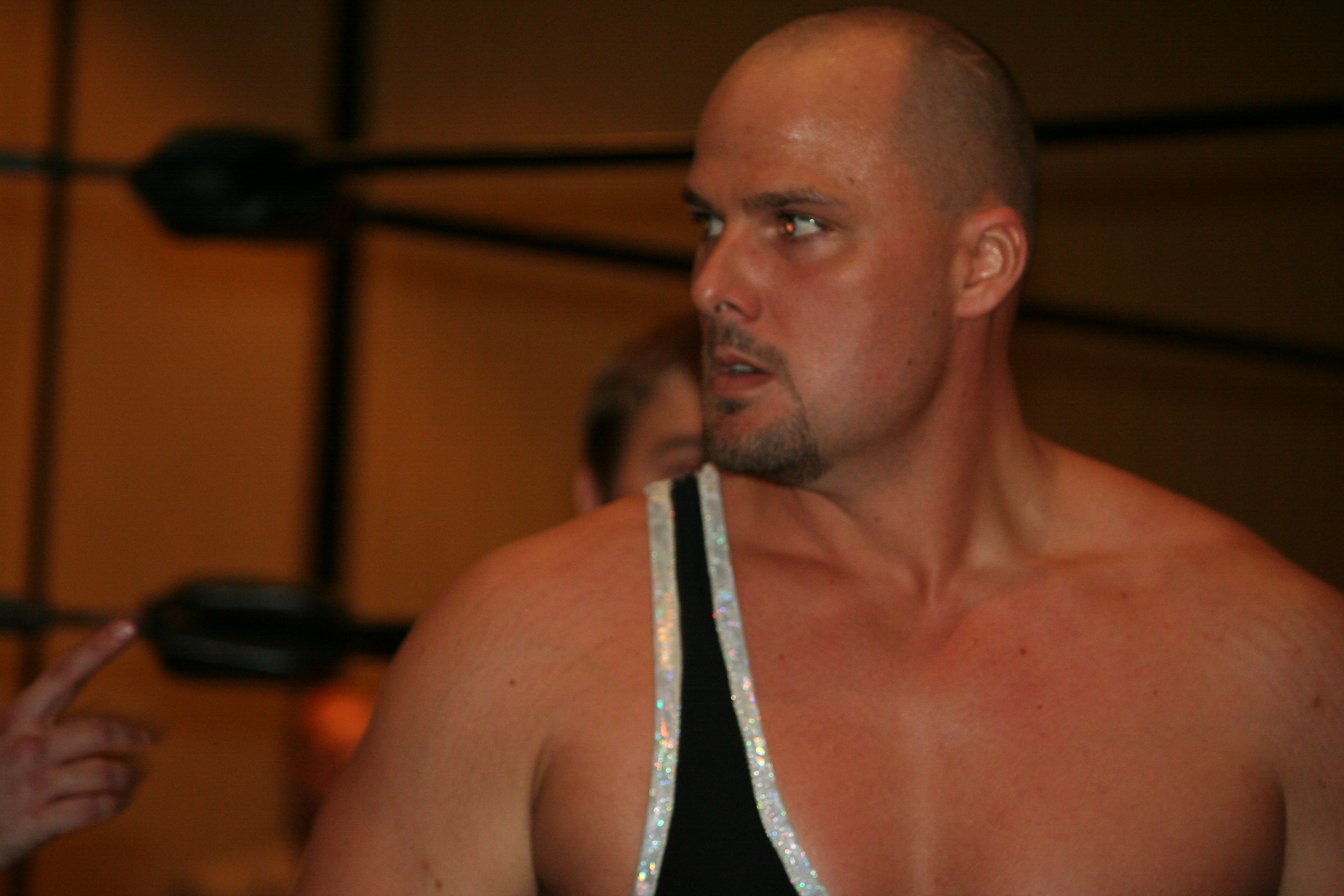
Adam Pearce in 2010

Pearce's feud with Albright picked up steam, as on June 28, 2008, Pearce and newest Sweet N'Sour Inc. member Go Shiozaki lost to Brent Albright and FIP World Champion Roderick Strong when the referee stopped the match after Albright landed repeated knee strikes to the head of Pearce. Post-match, Pearce threw a fireball into the face of Albright, resulting in Pearce being suspended for 30 days while Albright was out of action to convalesce and recover from the burns. On August 2, 2008, the feud took another turn when Brent Albright defeated Pearce via submission with the crowbar to win the NWA World Championship. This came after NWA Officials presented Pearce with a replica NWA "Red" title belt, repeating history as Jack Brisco defeated Harley Race for the NWA Red Belt after Race was presented with it by Sam Muchnick in 1973. On September 20, 2008, Pearce continued his year-long feud with Albright, defeating him at Glory by Honor VII to begin his second reign as champion.

On September 25, 2008, it was announced Pearce had departed Ring of Honor due to company cost-cutting measures. On October 26, 2008, Ring of Honor announced that Adam Pearce would become the new Head Booker of the company, replacing Gabe Sapolsky.

Despite his backstage role, Pearce made occasional wrestling appearances in ROH, notably during Caged Collision pay-per-view in Chicago on January 31, 2009, taking the pin in the Steel Cage main event. He also appeared at the "7th Anniversary Show" in New York, NY on March 21, 2009, losing to Bobby Dempsey in 30 seconds, and at "Eye of the Storm 2" on December 18, 2009, in Manassas, VA, where he teamed with Matt Classic in a loss to The Set.

On August 15, 2010, Pearce was replaced as the head booker of Ring of Honor due to what he described as "a difference of ideology".

=== National Wrestling Alliance (2006–2014) ===
Outside of ROH, Pearce has also been feuding with Sean Waltman over the NWA Heritage Championship on NWA Pro events throughout the US on their "Wrestling Summit" arena events, notably at the Orleans Arena in Las Vegas, among other arena venues. Pearce first won the title on October 21, 2006. Waltman took the title in El Paso, Texas, on April 21, 2007, only to lose it back to Pearce in Laredo, Texas, on April 29.

Pearce faced Brent Albright in the finals of the Reclaiming the Glory tournament to crown a new NWA World Heavyweight Champion. He had lost in the semi-finals to Bryan Danielson, but Danielson pulled out due to injury and Pearce replaced him. Pearce defeated Albright in Puerto Rico at an International Wrestling Association event to become the new NWA World Heavyweight Champion, the first champion since the belt was stripped from TNA. On October 13, 2007, he defended the NWA World Heavyweight Championship in Irving, Texas, against Sicodelico, Jr. The match ended in a 30-minute draw with Pearce retaining the belt.

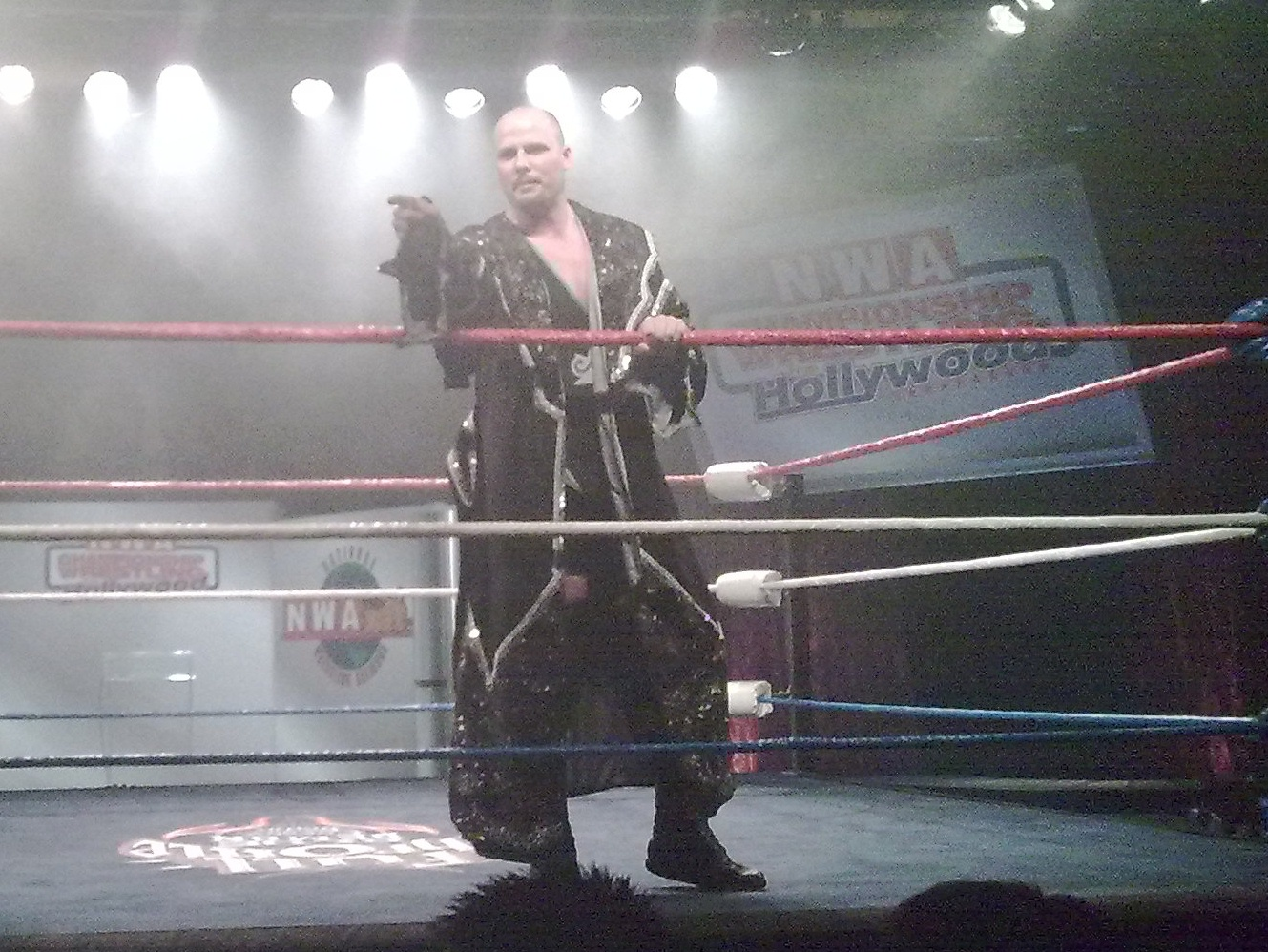
Pearce at an NWA TV Taping in 2008.

On October 27, 2007, he was one of the six participants in a WarGames cage match, teaming Karl Anderson and C. Edward Vander Pyle against Los Luchas and Sicodelico Jr. He and his team lost the match and were all busted open.

On May 10, 2008, he defended the NWA World Heavyweight Championship in King and Queen County, Virginia, against Damien Wayne. The match went the full 60 minute time limit with Pearce retaining the title. Pearce was managed in the contest by Baby Doll, the former valet for Tully Blanchard.

On August 2, 2008, Brent Albright defeated Pearce via submission with the crowbar to win the NWA World Championship. On August 30, 2008, Pearce challenged and was defeated by Albright in Mexico City in a rematch for the NWA World Title. This match was part of the debut of NWA Mexico, promoted by Blue Demon, Jr. Pearce pulled a pair of Brass Knuckles to presumably use on Albright, but Albright knocked them loose and hit Pearce for the pinfall. Post match, Pearce got into a slapping match with Blue Demon, Jr. over the decision.

On September 20, 2008, Pearce continued his year-long feud with Brent Albright, defeating him at Glory by Honor VII to begin his second reign as champion.

On October 25, 2008, in Mexico City, Mexico, Blue Demon, Jr. defeated Pearce to win the NWA Championship. Pearce defeated Dru Onyx on January 23, 2010, in Quebec City, Quebec, for the NWA British Commonwealth Heavyweight Championship.

Pearce defeated Blue Demon Jr, then holder of the NWA World Heavyweight Championship, and Phil Shatter in a three-way match to win the NWA World Heavyweight Championship for a third time on March 14, 2010, at NWA New Beginnings. Then at the NWA Legends Fanfest on August 7, 2010, Pearce successfully defended the NWA World Heavyweight Championship against Bryan Danielson. Pearce's third title reign ended on March 6, 2011, when he was defeated for the title by Colt Cabana at the NWA Championship Wrestling from Hollywood television tapings.

After leaving Ring of Honor, Pearce began working as head booker for NWA Championship Wrestling from Hollywood until stepping down due to 'family obligations'. Pearce's resignation allowed Joey Ryan to take over the book. Pearce continues to perform on the television show and acts as a producer for the series (credited as A.J. Pearce).

On July 31, 2011, Pearce won the NWA World Heavyweight Championship for the fourth time by defeating Chance Prophet, Jimmy Rave and Shaun Tempers in a four-way match to win the vacant title. He would lose the title to Colt Cabana on April 8, 2012. On July 21, Pearce regained the title from Cabana by defeating him in a Two Out of Three Falls match. On October 27, Pearce vacated the title, after the NWA refused to allow him to defend the title against Colt Cabana in a deciding match in the Best of Seven Series. After losing the series against Cabana, Pearce left the NWA. Pearce's NWA hiatus lasted only three months before NWA Smoky Mountain announced him as a participant in the Smoky Mountain Cup on April 26, 2013. After the event he made regular appearances for NWA until he retired from wrestling in 2014.

On February 5, 2015, Pearce was enshrined in the NWA Hall of Fame as the first inductee of the 2015 class.

==== Seven Levels of Hate ====
Following Pearce's loss of the NWA title for a second time to Colt Cabana on April 8, 2012, Pearce challenged Cabana to a Best-of-Seven series which was dubbed the "Seven Levels of Hate". The series would be contested under seven different stipulations in seven different locations, and the NWA championship would be at stake in each match.

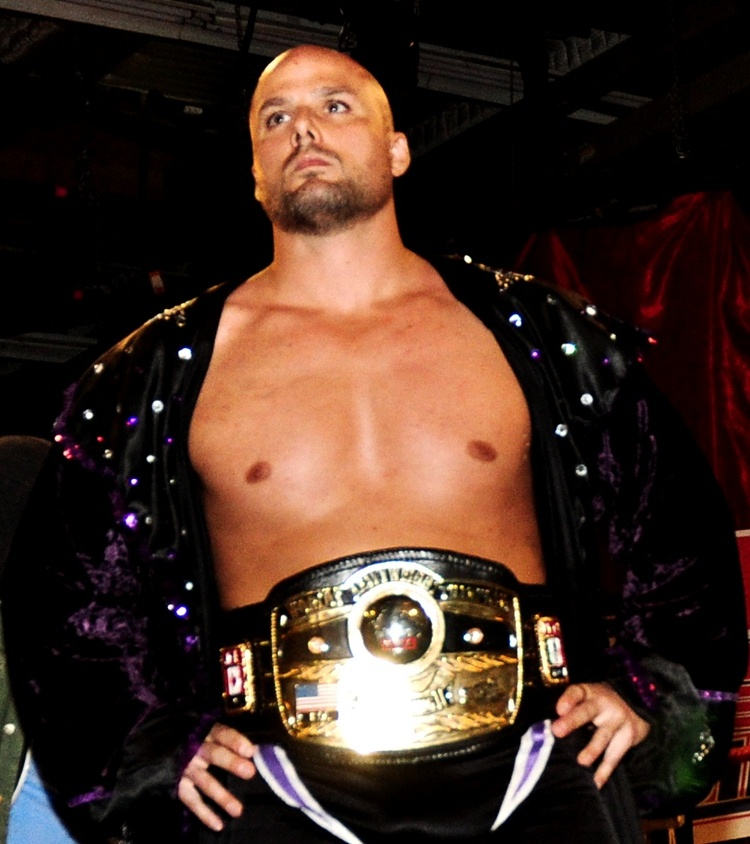
Pearce at an NWA TV Taping in 2012

The series began on May 13, 2012, in Glendale, California with a First Blood match in which Cabana would retain. Stage Two and a second Cabana win took place on June 8, 2012, with a Boston Street Fight, taking place in Bridgewater, Massachusetts. Pearce would ultimately go down 3–0 in the series, dropping the fall in the Stage Three "I Quit" match, which took place on July 7, 2012, in Hopkins, Minnesota. Pearce would claim his first win of the series, and his fifth NWA championship, by besting Cabana in their Stage Four match taking place under as a Two-out-of-Three Falls match. The match took place on July 21, 2012, in Kansas City, and would see Pearce knock Cabana out with the championship belt in order to score the deciding fall.

Pearce would go on a run for the next couple of matches, besting Cabana in their Stage Five Dog Collar match on August 18, 2012, in Bridgewater, Massachusetts and on September 30, 2012, in Stage Six's Texas Death match, which took place in Salem, Oregon. It was from this point on that the series took a dramatic turn due to internal politics and a power struggle within the NWA. As outlined in the 2013 Seven Levels of Hate documentary produced by Pearce, Texas attorney R. Bruce Tharpe filed a lawsuit against the promotion that resulted in him eventually assuming control over the NWA brand. As detailed in the film, Tharpe would soon sever ties with most everyone associated, including Colt Cabana and Adam Pearce.

The seventh and final Stage of Seven Levels of Hate would ultimately take place on October 27, 2012, in suburban Melbourne, Australia in a Steel Cage match. Cabana would win the bout and the series, but the behind-the-scenes unraveling of the NWA forced the match to remain "unsanctioned" by the brand, thus leaving Pearce technically still champion and in possession of the NWA title. After the match, both Pearce and Cabana verbally lambasted the NWA, with Cabana refusing to accept the title that Pearce felt he fairly won. Pearce, having lost the series, felt he had could no longer go on as the recognized champion, so both men symbolically dropped the championship belt onto the mat and walked off, leaving the NWA in the process.

The "Seven Levels of Hate" series and documentary film would go on to critical acclaim, with the Pearce-Cabana series being voted Third Runner-Up for "Feud of the Year" by Pro Wrestling Illustrated for all of professional wrestling in 2012. The film (produced and directed by Adam Pearce) would garner similar praise and would tour the United States on a limited festival run with stops in Chicago and New York. The DVD box set compilation was given a five-star review by Amazon.com, though it is currently out of print.

=== Other notable promotions and retirement (2010–2014) ===
Adam Pearce made his WFX Wrestling debut at 'Conflict of Interest to the Extreme 2010'. He defended the NWA World Heavyweight Championship against Wavell Starr, and later in the event attacked Shane Douglas with the NWA Title belt, avenging Douglas's casting aside of the same title in 1994.

On July 20, 2011, Pearce debuted as U.S. Marshal Adam J. Pearce at Juggalo Championship Wrestling's event Above The Law. There he aligned himself with Officer Colt Cabana, whom he later helped win the JCW World Heavyweight Championship.

On March 28, 2013, Pearce appeared on Impact Wrestling as it was announced that he would compete in a TNA Gut Check match against Magno for next week. On the April 4, 2013, edition of Impact Wrestling Pearce defeated Magno in a winning effort by holding the ring ropes in a TNA Gut Check match. The following week he was eliminated from the contest.

Pearce retired as an active professional wrestler on December 21, 2014, following a television taping of Championship Wrestling from Hollywood. Pearce lost to Colt Cabana on the card in what was the ninth and final chapter of their Seven Levels of Hate series. Pearce would soon relocate to Florida to join WWE full-time as a coach and producer at the WWE Performance Center.

=== Return to WWE (2013–present) ===
Pearce returned to the now-renamed World Wrestling Entertainment (WWE) when he first worked as a guest coach and trainer from December 2 through 6, 2013. He would continue to appear as a guest coach and trainer several times during 2014. On December 11, 2014, Pearce worked as a producer on WWE's NXT TakeOver: R Evolution event, making him the first unsigned Independent Contractor to produce live WWE programming. In May 2015, Pearce signed to join WWE full-time as a trainer at the WWE Performance Center and producer for NXT. He has since been promoted to the role of a producer on the main roster's Raw on Netflix and SmackDown on USA Network. On the June 5, 2018, episode of Smackdown Live, Pearce and Dean Malenko appeared during the contract signing between AJ Styles and Shinsuke Nakamura. Pearce appeared in on-screen speaking roles on the January 17, 2020, episode of Smackdown backstage making a match between Bayley and Lacey Evans, and again on the May 29 episode of SmackDown setting up a battle royal where the winner would face Daniel Bryan in the Intercontinental Championship tournament. Pearce is one of the main coaches tasked with training celebrities for WWE appearances, notably Bad Bunny and Logan Paul.

Pearce became the on-screen WWE authority figure for Raw and SmackDown in 2020, first appearing in an authority role on January 17. On the August 28, 2020, episode of SmackDown, Vince McMahon ordered Pearce to gather the signatures of Braun Strowman, Roman Reigns and "The Fiend" Bray Wyatt on the contract for their triple threat no holds barred Match at Payback. Pearce was successful getting Strowman and Wyatt to sign, but Reigns declined because there were changes that he wanted fixed. On the November 23, 2020, episode of Raw, Pearce was attacked by Braun Strowman, which resulted in Strowman being suspended for over two months. On the January 8, 2021, episode of SmackDown, Pearce began a storyline with WWE Universal Champion Roman Reigns. Reigns took issue with Pearce's recent booking decisions, including scheduling a gauntlet match for that night to determine Reigns's championship contender at the 2021 Royal Rumble. Against Pearce's decisions, Reigns's special counsel Paul Heyman convinced upper management to also book Pearce for the match, despite his on-screen role as a WWE official, subsequently being Pearce's first scheduled match since 2014 and his first match in WWE since 1997. Pearce was the final entrant in the gauntlet match, but as he was about to face Shinsuke Nakamura, Reigns and his cousin Jey Uso attacked Nakamura and Pearce, laying Pearce's body on top of Nakamura's for the pinfall and giving the win to Pearce. As a result, Pearce became Reigns's opponent at the Royal Rumble. On the January 15 episode of SmackDown, Pearce replaced himself with Kevin Owens, stating he was not "medically cleared" to compete. On the January 22 episode of SmackDown, Paul Heyman challenged Pearce to a match, but at the last minute replaced himself with Roman Reigns, who attacked Pearce before Kevin Owens intervened. On the March 1, 2021, episode of Raw, Pearce, at the direction of Shane McMahon, and Braun Strowman challenged Cedric Alexander, and Shelton Benjamin, for the Raw Tag Team Championship. Pearce was pinned when Strowman reluctantly tagged in Pearce at the direction of Shane McMahon. On the March 3, 2021, episode of WWE NXT, during the WWE Women's Tag Team Championship match, when the referee was down, Shayna Baszler applied the kirifuda clutch to where Pearce called for a referee to come down to the ring as Baszler passed out Dakota Kai even though she wasn't the legal competitor. This awarded Nia Jax and Baszler the win, retaining their titles. On the October 22, 2021, episode of SmackDown, Pearce was attacked by Brock Lesnar after he suspended Lesnar for his wrongful actions outside the ring. On the October 29, 2021, episode of SmackDown, Pearce sanctioned Lesnar to pay a one million dollar fine with the suspension.

On the April 18, 2022, episode of Raw, Pearce fined Bianca Belair $1 after she assaulted Sonya Deville backstage. Although he also informed Deville that there was an ongoing investigation into her conduct. On the May 9 episode, Pearce informed Deville that she was no longer an official with WWE, announcing a match between her and Alexa Bliss. Days after SummerSlam 2022, Pearce indefinitely suspended Ronda Rousey after attacking the referee and security personnel following the controversial ending of her match against Liv Morgan for the SmackDown Women's Championship while being pinned for having her shoulders flat on the ring floor. During the season premiere episode of SmackDown on October 13, 2023, Pearce was promoted by Triple H to General Manager of Raw after having served as WWE Official presiding over both Raw and SmackDown since January, 2020. Nick Aldis was introduced as SmackDown's general manager.

== Major League Baseball ==
During the 2014 Major League Baseball season, Pearce auditioned for the vacant San Diego Padres public address announcer position at Petco Park. Pearce survived multiple rounds of cuts, landing in the Top 10 before being eliminated during the last week of auditions.

== Other media ==
In 2012 Pearce made an appearance in the 2012 comedy film She Wants Me. In 2013 Pearce self-produced and financed a film chronicling his worldwide rivalry with Colt Cabana entitled Seven Levels of Hate.

Pearce appears as a general manager in the following video games WWE 2k22, WWE 2K23, WWE 2K24, WWE 2K25 and WWE 2K26.

== Personal life ==
Pearce is married and lives in Florida. He is a life-long fan of the Chicago Cubs and is a shareholder of the Green Bay Packers.

== Championships and accomplishments ==
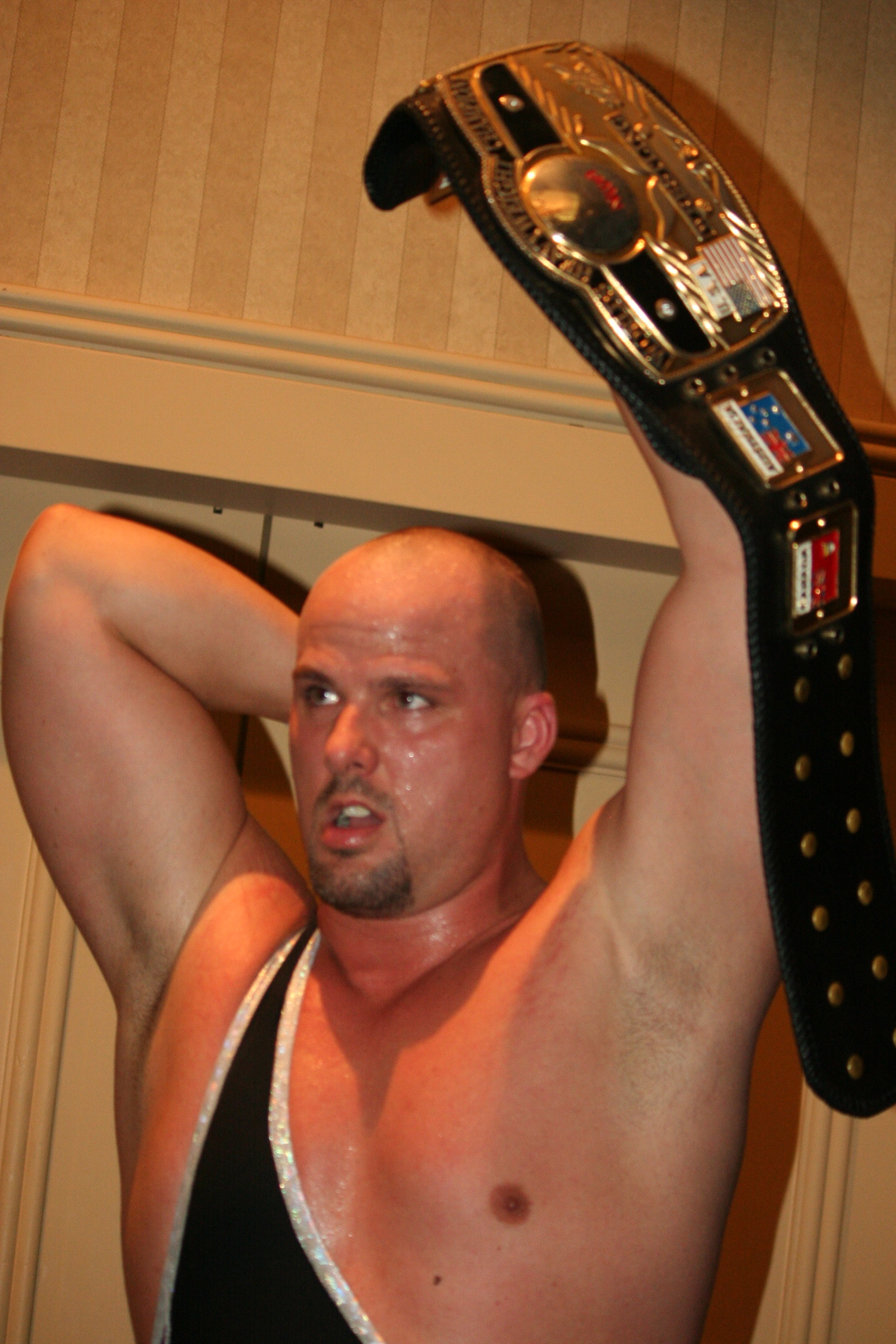
Pearce is a five-time NWA World Heavyweight Champion.

- All-Star Championship Wrestling
  - ACW Heavyweight Championship (1 time)
  - ACW Television Championship (1 time)
- Alternative Wrestling Show
  - AWS Heavyweight Championship (1 time)
- Cauliflower Alley Club
  - Men's Wrestling Award (2014)
- NWA Pro Wrestling
  - NWA Heritage Championship (2 times)
- Great Lakes Wrestling
  - GLW Heavyweight Championship (1 time)
- Independent Wrestling Association Mid-South
  - IWA Mid-South Light Heavyweight Championship (1 time)
- National Wrestling Alliance
  - NWA World Heavyweight Championship (5 times)
  - NWA British Commonwealth Heavyweight Championship (1 time)
  - NWA Hall of Fame (Class of 2015)
- Metro Pro Wrestling
  - Metro Pro Heavyweight Championship (1 time)
- Mid-American Wrestling
  - MAW Heavyweight Championship (1 time)
- Professional Championship Wrestling
  - PCW Australian National Championship (1 time)
- Pro Wrestling Guerrilla
  - PWG World Championship (1 time)
- Pro Wrestling Illustrated
  - Ranked No. 44 of the top 500 singles wrestlers in the PWI 500 in 2008
- Steel Domain Wrestling
  - SDW Northern States Television Championship (1 time)
- Ultimate Pro Wrestling
  - UPW Heavyweight Championship (1 time)
