= Alkatrazz =

English heavy metal band (1980–1983)

- Origin: Maidstone, England
- Genres: Heavy metal; hard rock
- Years active: 1980–1983
- Labels: RCA
- Past members: Craig Stevens: Bob Jenner; Nicko Parsons; Gary Bevan; Phillip Tame; Dave Saunders

Alkatrazz were an English heavy metal band from Maidstone, Kent, England. Formed in 1980 as part of the new wave of British heavy metal (NWOBHM) movement, the group originally featured lead vocalist Craig Stevens, guitarist and backing vocalist Bob Jenner, bassist Gary Bevan, and drummer and backing vocalist Nick Parsons. In 1981 they signed to RCA Records and released their debut album Young Blood, followed by their second Radio 5 the following year. Shortly after the latter's release, Alkatrazz were dropped by the label. Bevan was briefly replaced by Phillip Tame, before the group disbanded in 1983.

== History ==
Bob Jenner and Nicko Parsons originally performed as part of jazz fusion band Interface, before being persuaded by their manager Tony Tullett to "move to a more rock direction". After bringing in bassist Gary Bevan, the group began rehearsing with a second guitarist, Dave Saunders. Craig Stevens was enlisted after responding to an advertisement in Melody Maker magazine. The band took on the name Alkatrazz and spent "around six months" performing local shows before they were signed by RCA Records, following a performance on the BBC Radio Kent Rock Show.

Alkatrazz recorded their debut album Young Blood at Magritte and Regents Park Studios in London, which was released in May 1981 preceded the month before by their first single "Rockin' High". The band toured in promotion of the album alongside fellow NWOBHM acts Magnum, Tygers of Pan Tang and Samson. Shortly after touring with Samson, Alkatrazz returned to the studio to record their second album Radio 5, on which they adopted a sound more akin to American album-oriented rock (AOR) acts. The album featured guest appearances by Toni Childs and Mel Collins.

Shortly after the release of Radio 5, however, Alkatrazz were dropped by RCA. Bevan was fired from the band around the same time, which, according to Stevens, was "a knee jerk reaction born out of frustration", and was replaced by their sound engineer Phillip Tame. Despite several sources claiming that Parsons was replaced by former Iron Maiden drummer Clive Burr in 1983, he was not; Burr had joined Alcatrazz, an American group with a similar name. Bevan has commented on Burr reportedly having joined, "I have no idea where that one came from but I do think it's quite funny." Shortly thereafter, Alkatrazz disbanded.

== Members ==
- Craig Stevens – lead vocals (1980–83)
- Bob Jenner – guitar, backing vocals (1980–83)
- Nicko Parsons – drums, percussion, backing vocals (1980–83)
- Gary Bevan – bass (1980–82)
- Phillip Tame – bass (1982–83)
- Dave Saunders - guitar (1980)

== Discography ==
Studio albums

- Young Blood (1981)
- Radio 5 (1982)

Singles

- "Rockin' High" (1981)
- "You and the Night" (1981)
- "Think It Over" (1982)
