= NWA Heritage Championship =

Details
- Promotion: NWA Circle City Wrestling
- Date established: January 23, 2016
- Current champion(s): Badd Blood
- Date won: July 17, 2017

Other name(s)
- NWA Heritage Championship (2016-present)
Statistics
- First champion(s): Adam Pearce
- Most reigns: Badd Blood (5 times)
- Longest reign: Badd Blood (850 days)
- Shortest reign: Sean Waltman (8 days)

The NWA Heritage Championship is a title sanctioned by the National Wrestling Alliance.

== Title history ==
As of March 26, 2025.

#	Order in reign history
Reign	The reign number for the specific set of wrestlers listed
—	Used for vacated reigns so as not to count it as an official reign
+	Indicates the current reign is changing daily

No.	Champion	Reign	Date	Days held	Location	Notes	Ref
1	Rob Kincade	1	January 23, 2016	79	Madison, IN	Title returned to the National Wrestling Alliance at NWA Circle City Wrestling and is placed in a 30 man battle royal to crown a new champion in which Kincade won.	
2	Badd Blood	1	April 11, 2016	249	Las Vegas, NV	Won the title in a six man inter-promotional match at Cauliflower Alley Club where all the titles were on the line. Pinning former champion Rob Kincade.	
3	Dave Hollenbeck	1	June 12, 2016	28	Portland, OR	Won the title by DQ in a special challenge match, after Badd Blood got caught with the chair that Havoc brought into the ring.	
4	Tex Thompson	1	July 10, 2016	21	Portland, OR		
—	Vacated	—	July 31, 2016	—	—	Vacated due to injury.	
5	Lonestar	1	September 18, 2016	168	Portland, OR		
6	Teck Tonik	1	March 5, 2017	14	Portland, OR		
7	Lonestar	2	March 19, 2017	14	Portland, OR		
8	Teck Tonik	2	April 2, 2017	21	Portland, OR	Tonik won the title in a 2-out-of-3 falls match.	
9	Buddy Highway	1	April 23, 2017	14	Portland, OR		
10	Teck Tonik	3	May 7, 2017	2923	Portland, OR	Teck Tonik relinquished the title July 30, 2017.	
—	Vacated	—	July 30, 2017	—	—		
11	David Wells	1	June 1, 2017	1	Dallas, TX	Won battle royal after Teck Tonik relinquished the title	
12	Badd Blood	2	July 1, 2017	150	Dallas, TX	Beat Wells in a falls count anywhere match	
13	Zack Winters	1	December 17, 2017	17	Portland, OR	Beat Badd Blood at Clash of the Titans 3	
14	Badd Blood	3	January 7, 2018	12	Portland, OR	Beat Zack Winters in a special challenge match	
15	Tyson Flynn	1	January 19, 2018	1	Los Angeles, CA	Beat Badd Blood but both shoulders were down so the title was held up	
16	Badd Blood	4	January 20, 2018	2,622+	Los Angeles, CA	Defeated Flynn in a no DQ match	

== Combined reigns ==
As of March 26, 2025.

†	Indicates the current champion

Rank	Champion	No. of reigns	Combined days
1	Rob Kincade	1	79
2	Badd Blood	5	379
3	Dave Hollenbeck	1	28
4	Tex Thompson	1	21
5	Buddy Highway	1	14
6	Lonestar	2	168
7	Teck Tonik	3	306

== See also ==
- National Wrestling Alliance
- CWFH Heritage Heavyweight Championship
