= Battle of Los Angeles (2006) =

2006 professional wrestling tournament by PWG

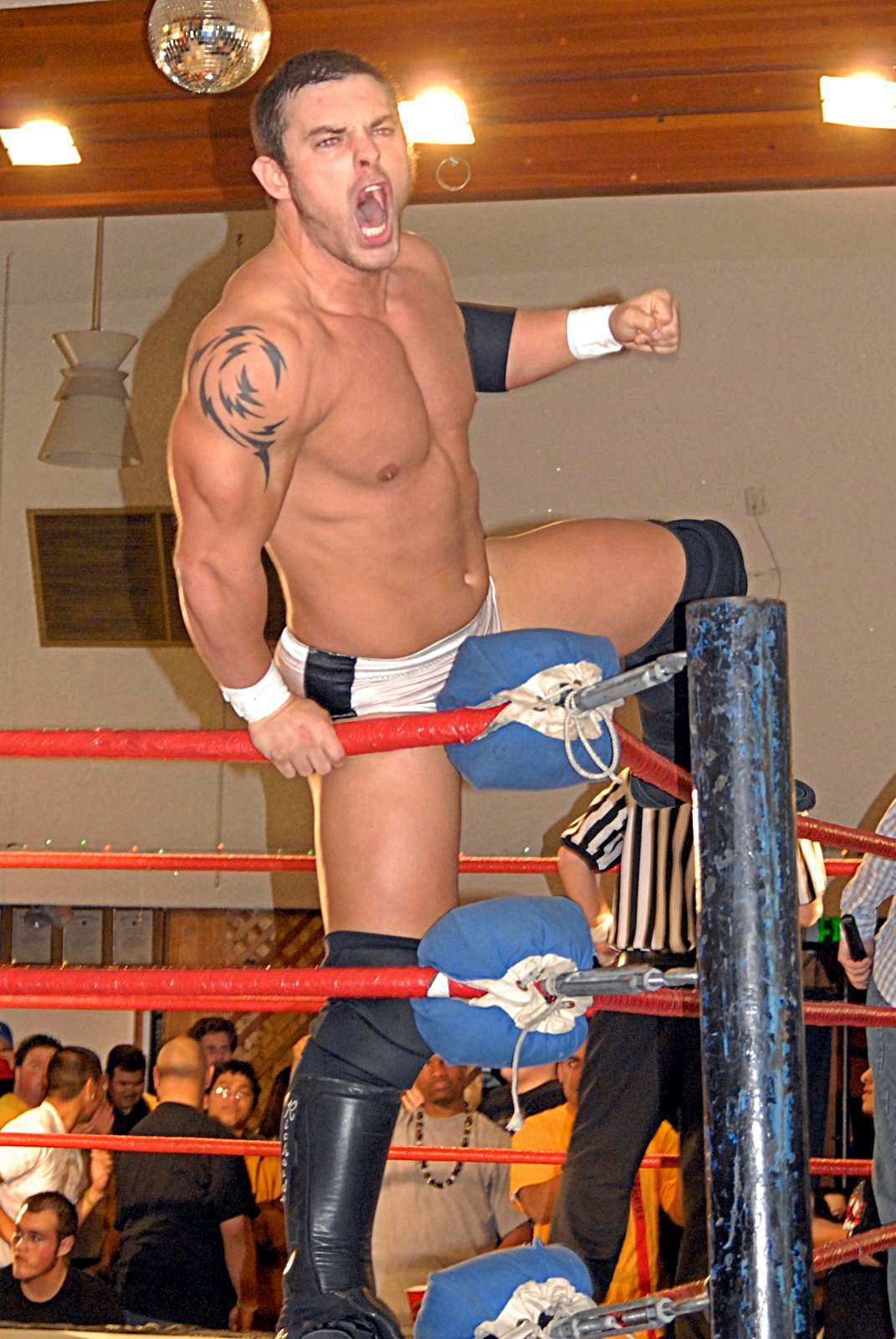
- The 2006 tournament winner Davey Richards
- Promotion: Pro Wrestling Guerrilla
- Date: Night One: September 1, 2006; Night Two: September 2, 2006; Night Three: September 3, 2006
- City: Reseda, Los Angeles, California
- Venue: American Legion Post #308
- Attendance: 1200 (combined); Night One: 400; Night Two: 400; Night Three: 400

Event chronology
← Previous; Threemendous	Next → Self-Titled

Battle of Los Angeles chronology
← Previous; 2005	Next → 2007

Battle of Los Angeles (2006) was the second Battle of Los Angeles professional wrestling tournament produced by Pro Wrestling Guerrilla (PWG). It was a three-night event held on September 1, September 2 and September 3, 2006 at the American Legion Post #308 in Reseda, California.

The 2006 tournament featured twenty-four participants which concluded with Davey Richards defeating Cima in the final on the night three. It also marked the returns of The Briscoe Brothers and Super Dragon to PWG. The event featured the PWG debuts of Dragon Gate wrestlers Cima, Dragon Kid and Genki Horiguchi.

Aside from the tournament, eight-man tag team matches took place on the first and third night. The second night featured a four corners elimination match between Joey Ryan, Excalibur, Human Tornado and Petey Williams for the PWG World Championship and a three-way dance between Arrogance (Chris Bosh and Scott Lost), the team of B-Boy and Homicide and The Briscoe Brothers for the PWG World Tag Team Championship.

== Background ==
=== Original lineup ===
On June 3, Scorpio Sky announced himself as the first participant in the 2006 Battle of Los Angeles tournament at Fear of a Black Planet. The first match announced for the tournament pitted M-Dogg 20 against Dragon Gate wrestler Cima, marking the latter's PWG debut. On June 24, Dragon Gate wrestler Genki Horiguchi would be announced to make his PWG debut against Chris Hero. On June 29, Jack Evans would be announced to compete against Claudio Castagnoli. On June 30, PWG Commissioner Dino Winwood announced that Sky would compete against Frankie Kazarian in the tournament, stemming from Sky's attack on Kazarian at (Please Don't Call It) The OC event and resulted in Sky cutting off Kazarian's ponytail.

On July 5, new tournament matches were announced for the tournament including Disco Machine versus Colt Cabana and Chris Sabin versus Roderick Strong. The following day, on July 6, a new match was announced between Matt Sydal and Mark Briscoe. On July 8, a match was announced between T.J. Perkins against Davey Richards and Jay Briscoe would compete against Alex Koslov. On July 10, new matches were announced pitting Kevin Steen against Quicksilver and El Generico against Delirious. On July 26, the final match in the tournament was announced between Super Dragon and Necro Butcher, which PWG heavily hyped as a "dream match".

=== Replacement ===
However, on July 18, significant changes took place in the tournament. Alex Koslov was sent to Mexico on a six-month learning excursion and Austin Aries was announced as his replacement against Jay Briscoe. However, Commissioner Dino Winwood removed The Briscoe Brothers (Jay and Mark) from the tournament due to no-showing Threemendous event where they were scheduled to compete. Bryan Danielson was then announced to replace Jay Briscoe against Aries. Dragon Kid, a third wrestler representing Dragon Gate, would then be announced to replace Mark Briscoe against Quicksilver while Briscoe's originally scheduled opponent Kevin Steen would take on Quicksilver's originally scheduled opponent Matt Sydal.

However, Danielson separated his shoulder on August 26 in a Ring of Honor match against Colt Cabana. This led to some more changes to the card as Disco Machine would take on Austin Aries, Colt Cabana would take on Chris Sabin, Roderick Strong would take on Rocky Romero and Davey Richards would take on Ronin, a replacement for the injured T.J. Perkins.

== Event ==
=== Night 1 ===
The Battle of Los Angeles tournament kicked off with a match between Chris Sabin and Colt Cabana. Sabin pinned Cabana with an O'Connor roll.

Next, Delirious took on El Generico. Generico hit Delirious with two big boots and a half nelson suplex for the win.

Next, Cima made his PWG debut against M-Dogg 20. CIMA countered a hurricanrana from M-Dogg 20 into a Schwein for the win.

Next, Kevin Steen took on Matt Sydal. Steen countered a hurricanrana from the top rope by Steen into a superbomb for the win.

Next, the debuting Dragon Kid took on Quicksilver. Dragon Kid dropkicked Quicksilver off the top rope and nailed a Dragonrana for the win.

Next, Roderick Strong took on Rocky Romero. Strong got out of various submission holds by Romero and hit a gutbuster, followed by a double underhook powerbomb. Strong then applied a Stronghold on Romero to make him submit for the win.

This was followed by the main event of night one, an eight-man tag team match, in which the team of B-Boy, Excalibur, Homicide and Human Tornado took on Petey Williams and The Dynasty (Chris Bosh, Joey Ryan and Scott Lost). The match reached its conclusion when Ryan accidentally hit Williams, prompting Williams to deliver a Canadian Destroyer to Ryan and abandon his teammates. This allowed Excalibur to crawl over Ryan and pin him for the win. After the match, The Briscoe Brothers (Jay and Mark) made their surprise return to PWG and attacked Homicide.

=== Night 2 ===
The first round of the BOLA continued on the second night with a match between Austin Aries and Disco Machine. Aries moved out of a choke by Machine by hitting elbows and then nailed a brainbuster and applied a scissored armbar to make him submit for the win.

Next, Davey Richards took on Ronin. Richards executed a D.R. Driver on Ronin for the win.

Next, Claudio Castagnoli took on Jack Evans. Evans countered a Ricola Bomb from the top rope by Castagnoli into a hurricanrana and nailed a 630° senton on Castagnoli for the win.

Next, Chris Hero took on the debuting Genki Horiguchi. Horiguchi countered a Hero's Welcome by Hero into a Backslide From Heaven for the win.

It was followed by a Four Corners Elimination match, in which Joey Ryan defended the PWG World Championship against Excalibur, Human Tornado and Petey Williams. However, Tornado was unable to compete due to a shoulder injury, leading to a three-way match between Ryan, Excalibur and Williams. Excalibur scored the first elimination by countering a Canadian Destroyer by Williams into a roll-up and pinning him in the process. Williams retaliated by hitting a piledriver to Excalibur, allowing Ryan to pin him for the elimination. Ryan apparently retained the title until Tornado showed up and attacked Ryan, forcing him to retreat and get counted out, thus retaining the title in the process.

Next, Arrogance members Chris Bosh and Scott Lost defended the PWG Tag Team Championship against the Briscoe Brothers and the team of Homicide and B-Boy in a Three-Way Dance. B-Boy nailed a Go 2 Sleep to Mark Briscoe followed by Homicide executing a Cop Killa on Briscoe. Bosh rushed in and threw Homicide out of the ring and pinned Briscoe to retain the titles.

This match was followed with the continuation of the BOLA as Frankie Kazarian took on Scorpio Sky. Jade Chung was initially banned from ringside but showed up to prevent Kazarian from powerbombing Sky from the stage onto a pile of chairs but Kazarian powerbombed Sky onto the chairs. Jade hit Kazarian with a pair of scissors resulting in Sky getting disqualified and Kazarian advancing to the next round. After the match, Kazarian tried to cut Chung's hair off until The Dynasty made the save allowing her to retreat.

It was followed by the final match in the first round of BOLA as Super Dragon made his return from injury after a four-month absence to take on Necro Butcher in a no disqualification match, which PWG billed as a "dream match". After a lengthy match, Dragon nailed a Psycho Driver to Butcher onto a chair for the win.

=== Night 3 ===
==== Quarterfinals ====
The night three started with the quarterfinal round of the BOLA, with the first match pitting Chris Sabin against El Generico. Generico avoided a front dropkick by Sabin and countered with a mule kick and a brainbuster for the win.

Next, CIMA took on Kevin Steen. CIMA avoided a package piledriver by Steen and hit a superkick before pinning Steen with a roll-up for the win.

Next, Roderick Strong took on Dragon Kid. Strong countered a Dragonrana by Kid into a Stronghold to make him submit for the win.

In the following match, Austin Aries took on Davey Richards. Aries got a near-fall after a brainbuster and attempted to hit a 450° splash but Richards moved out of the way, further hurting Aries' injured ribs. Richards capitalized by applying an inverted cloverleaf on Aries, pressurizing his ribs and making him submit.

Next, Jack Evans took on Genki Horiguchi. Evans countered a Backslide From Heaven by Horiguchi into a bridge and pinned Horiguchi for the win.

It was followed by the last quarterfinal between Frankie Kazarian and Super Dragon. However, Kazarian was attacked by The Dynasty before the match and Dynasty drove him onto a chair back first to knock him out until Dragon made the save and curb stomp to Jade Chung onto a chair. The assault rendered Kazarian unable to compete allowing Dragon to advance to the semifinal by forfeit.

==== Semifinals ====
Next, the semifinal began with a match between El Generico and CIMA. After countering a brainbuster by Generico from the top rope into a Tornado DDT, CIMA hit a Schwein on Generico but got a near-fall. CIMA followed it by nailing a Schwein Redline to Generico for the win.

Next, Roderick Strong took on Davey Richards. Richards countered a Stronghold by Strong into a roll-up and pinned him for the win.

It was followed by the last semifinal between Super Dragon and Jack Evans. Dragon attempted to deliver a Psycho Driver to Evans from the top rope but Evans moved out of it. Dragon ultimately caught Evans and hit a ganso bomb to Evans from the top rope onto the mat for the win.

==== Non-tournament match ====
Next, an eight-man tag team match took place pitting Colt Cabana, M-Dogg 20, Quicksilver and Rocky Romero against Necro Butcher, Rocky Romero and Kings of Wrestling (Chris Hero and Claudio Castagnoli). Quicksilver delivered a diving hurricanrana off Castagnoli's shoulders onto Hero for the win.

==== Final ====
It was followed by the main event which was the final of the 2006 BOLA, a three-way match between Super Dragon, Davey Richards and CIMA. However, The Dynasty attacked Dragon backstage, thus removing him from the match, making it a singles match between Richards and CIMA. CIMA got a near-fall by hitting a Schwein to Richards and then CIMA attempted to deliver another Schwein but Richards countered it into a DR Driver to win the match and the 2006 Battle of Los Angeles tournament.

== Reception ==
Arnold Furious of 411Mania rated the tournament 8 out of 10, appreciating the night three as a whole but criticizing the opening round and the company's booking, feeling that PWG "cheated the fans out of their advertised main event and another marquee match in an attempt to continue their Dynasty Vs Main Eventers storyline."

Magnus Donaldson praised the night one of the tournament, considering it a "very solid card of wrestling".

== Aftermath ==
Davey Richards did not follow the tradition of the Battle of Los Angeles tournament winner getting a PWG World Championship title shot but instead used his tournament win to challenge for the PWG Tag Team Championship alongside his former tag team championship partner Super Dragon in hopes of regaining the tag team titles. However, Richards did not show up at Self-Titled and instead B-Boy substituted for him and teamed with Dragon to challenge Chris Bosh and Scott Lost for the tag team titles. Dragon and B-Boy won the tag team titles. Richards was bitter towards Dragon for preferring to team with B-Boy over himself, leading to Richards teaming with Roderick Strong to challenge Dragon and B-Boy for the titles at the first night of All Star Weekend, where Richards and Strong won the championship. However, Richards and Strong lost the titles back to Dragon and B-Boy in a four-way match, the following night.

Frankie Kazarian continued his feud with Scorpio Sky after the Battle of Los Angeles, leading to Kazarian facing Sky and Jade Chung in a handicap first blood match at Self-Titled, which Kazarian lost after a false finish. Kazarian faced Sky in a series of tag team matches at All Star Weekend and Passive Hostility. The feud culminated in a loser leaves PWG match at Based on a True Story, which Kazarian won.

Human Tornado continued to pursue the PWG World Championship as he defeated the reigning champion Joey Ryan in a non-title match at Self-Titled. At Passive Hostility, Ryan retained the title against Tornado and Kevin Steen in a three-way match by getting disqualified after hitting Tornado with a chair. Tornado finally defeated Ryan for the World Championship in a Guerrilla Warfare at Based on a True Story, ending Ryan's year-long reign.

== Results ==
Night 1 (September 1)
No.	Results	Stipulations	Times
1	Chris Sabin defeated Colt Cabana	Battle of Los Angeles tournament first round match	9:01
2	El Generico defeated Delirious	Battle of Los Angeles tournament first round match	15:42
3	CIMA defeated M-Dogg 20	Battle of Los Angeles tournament first round match	12:00
4	Kevin Steen defeated Matt Sydal	Battle of Los Angeles tournament first round match	15:57
5	Dragon Kid defeated Quicksilver	Battle of Los Angeles tournament first round match	12:05
6	Roderick Strong defeated Rocky Romero	Battle of Los Angeles tournament first round match	17:34
7	B-Boy, Excalibur, Homicide and Human Tornado (with Candice LeRae) defeated Petey Williams and The Dynasty (Chris Bosh, Joey Ryan and Scott Lost) (with Jade Chung)	Eight-man tag team match	26:23

Night 2 (September 2)
No.	Results	Stipulations	Times
1	Austin Aries defeated Disco Machine	Battle of Los Angeles tournament first round match	10:26
2	Davey Richards defeated Ronin	Battle of Los Angeles tournament first round match	12:12
3	Jack Evans defeated Claudio Castagnoli	Battle of Los Angeles tournament first round match	14:26
4	Genki Horiguchi defeated Chris Hero	Battle of Los Angeles tournament first round match	10:42
5	Human Tornado defeated Joey Ryan (c), Excalibur and Petey Williams (Note: Eliminations were as follows: Eliminated / Wrestler / Eliminated by / Elimination Move; 1 / Petey Williams / Excalibur / Pinned with a roll-up by countering a Canadian Destroyer; 2 / Excalibur / Joey Ryan / Pinned after a Piledriver by Petey Williams; 3 / Joey Ryan / Human Tornado / Count-out; 4 / Winner: / Human Tornado)	Four Corners Elimination match for the PWG World Championship	15:58
6	Arrogance (Chris Bosh and Scott Lost) (c) defeated B-Boy and Homicide and The Briscoe Brothers (Jay and Mark)	Three Way Dance for the PWG Tag Team Championship	15:25
7	Frankie Kazarian defeated Scorpio Sky (with Jade Chung) via disqualification	Battle of Los Angeles tournament first round match	12:21
8	Super Dragon defeated Necro Butcher	No Disqualification match in the first round of the Battle of Los Angeles tournament	25:59
(c) / – the champion(s) heading into the match

Night 3 (September 3)
No.	Results	Stipulations	Times
1	El Generico defeated Chris Sabin	Battle of Los Angeles tournament quarter-final round match	16:20
2	CIMA defeated Kevin Steen	Battle of Los Angeles tournament quarter-final round match	14:18
3	Roderick Strong defeated Dragon Kid	Battle of Los Angeles tournament quarter-final round match	15:14
4	Davey Richards defeated Austin Aries	Battle of Los Angeles tournament quarter-final round match	16:13
5	Jack Evans defeated Genki Horiguchi	Battle of Los Angeles tournament quarter-final round match	10:23
6	CIMA defeated El Generico	Battle of Los Angeles tournament semi-final round match	19:01
7	Davey Richards defeated Roderick Strong	Battle of Los Angeles tournament semi-final round match	11:06
8	Super Dragon defeated Jack Evans	Battle of Los Angeles tournament semi-final round match	9:15
9	Colt Cabana, Delirious, M-Dogg 20 and Quicksilver defeated Necro Butcher, Rocky Romero and Kings of Wrestling (Chris Hero and Claudio Castagnoli)	Eight-man tag team match	30:09
10	Davey Richards defeated CIMA	Battle of Los Angeles tournament final round match	13:38

=== Tournament brackets ===
Battle of Los Angeles (2006)
Tournament information
- Sport: Professional wrestling
- Location: Reseda, Los Angeles, California
- Dates: September 1, 2006–September 3, 2006
- Tournament format(s): Single elimination tournament
- Participants: 24

Final positions
- Champion: Davey Richards
- Runner-up: Cima

First round
Colt Cabana	Pin
Chris Sabin	09:01
Delirious	Pin
El Generico	15:42
Cima	Pin
M-Dogg 20	12:00
Kevin Steen	Pin
Matt Sydal	15:57

Quarterfinals
Chris Sabin	Pin
El Generico	16:20
Cima	Pin
Kevin Steen	14:18

Semifinals
El Generico	Pin
Cima	19:01

First round
Quicksilver	Pin
Dragon Kid	12:05
Roderick Strong	Sub
Rocky Romero	17:34
Austin Aries	Sub
Disco Machine	10:26
Davey Richards	Pin
Ronin	12:12

Quarterfinals
Dragon Kid	Sub
Roderick Strong	15:14
Austin Aries	Sub
Davey Richards	14:13

Semifinals
Roderick Strong	Pin
Davey Richards	11:07

First round
Jack Evans	Pin
Claudio Castagnoli	14:26
Chris Hero	Pin
Genki Horiguchi	10:42
Frankie Kazarian	Pin
Scorpio Sky	12:21
Super Dragon*	Pin
Necro Butcher*	25:59

Quarterfinals
Jack Evans	Pin
Genki Horiguchi	10:23
Frankie Kazarian	Bye
Super Dragon	00:00†

Semifinals
Jack Evans	Pin
Super Dragon	09:16

Finals
Davey Richards	Pin
Cima‡	13:38

* = This was a No Disqualification match
‡ = Super Dragon was attacked backstage by the Dynasty before his final match taking him out of the tournament
