= Battle of Los Angeles (2005) =

2005 professional wrestling tournament by PWG

- Promotion: Pro Wrestling Guerrilla
- Date: Night One: September 3, 2005; Night Two: September 4, 2005
- City: Los Angeles, California
- Venue: Hollywood-Los Feliz Jewish Community Center
- Attendance: 950 (combined); Night One: 500; Night Two: 450

Event chronology
← Previous; Smells Like Steen Spirit	Next → After School Special

Battle of Los Angeles chronology
← Previous; First	Next → 2006

Battle of Los Angeles (2005) was the first Battle of Los Angeles professional wrestling tournament produced by Pro Wrestling Guerrilla (PWG). It was a two-night event which took place on September 3 and September 4, 2005 at the Hollywood-Los Feliz Jewish Community Center in Los Angeles, California.

It was a sixteen-man tournament which concluded with Chris Bosh defeating AJ Styles in the tournament final to win the inaugural tournament. In the non-tournament matches, Gunning For Hookers (Hook Bomberry and Top Gun Talwar) and Human Tornado defeated Chris Sabin, Disco Machine and Excalibur during the first night while Chris Sabin, Hook Bomberry and T. J. Perkins defeated Disco Machine, Excalibur and Ronin in a six-man tag team match while NOSAWA and Samoa Joe defeated Kikutaro and Top Gun Talwar in a tag team match and El Generico, Frankie Kazarian, Jack Evans and Super Dragon defeated Davey Richards, Joey Ryan, Ricky Reyes and Scott Lost in an eight-man tag team match.

== Background ==
In August 2005, PWG announced the participants of the Battle of Los Angeles tournament. Chris Sabin was originally announced as a participant in the tournament against Frankie Kazarian but Sabin broke his jaw, forcing him to withdraw from the tournament. Rocky Romero replaced Sabin in the tournament.

== Event ==
=== Night 1 ===
The event kicked off with a six-man tag team match pitting Gunning For Hookers (Hook Bomberry and Top Gun Talwar) and Human Tornado against Chris Sabin, Disco Machine and Excalibur. Tornado nailed a DND on Excalibur for the win.

Next, the Battle of Los Angeles kicked off with a match between Frankie Kazarian and Rocky Romero. Romero reversed a roll-up attempt by Kazarian by twisting his hips and pinning Kazarian with a double leg cradle for the win.

Next, Davey Richards took on Quicksilver. Quicksilver attacked Richards while Richards had climbed the top rope and delivered a Silver Flash from the top rope for the win.

Next, James Gibson took on Joey Ryan. Gibson hit a Gibson Driver to Ryan for the win.

Next, Chris Bosh took on El Generico. Bosh blocked a jumping brainbuster attempt by Generico and countered it into a vertical suplex piledriver for the win.

Next, American Dragon took on Ricky Reyes. Dragon countered a dragon sleeper by Reyes and applied a crossface chickenwing on Reyes to make him submit to the hold for the win.

Next, Christopher Daniels took on Scott Lost. Lost attempted to apply a sharpshooter on Daniels after hitting a spear but Daniels countered with a low blow and an Angel's Wings for the win. Lost attacked the referee after the match until Scorpio Sky returned and attacked Lost.

Later, AJ Styles took on Jack Evans. Styles was knocked out of the ring via the top rope by Evans. Evans then attempted to hit a diving front flip but Styles countered it into a Styles Clash on the floor outside the ring and then tossed Evans into the ring to pin him for the win.

It was followed by the last match in the first round between the PWG Champion Kevin Steen and Super Dragon. Dragon nailed a Psycho Driver on Steen for a near-fall which Steen countered by pinning Dragon with a crucifix for the win. After the match, Dragon extended a handshake to Steen and Steen shook his hands and hugged him and then Dragon attacked Steen and tried to hit a Supernatural Driver but Disco Machine and Excalibur made the save.

=== Night 2 ===
The second night of the event kicked off with a six-man tag team match pitting Chris Sabin, Hook Bomberry and T. J. Perkins against Disco Machine, Excalibur and Ronin. After a series of finishers among the six participants, Sabin concluded the match by nailing a Cradle Shock to Excalibur for the win.

Next, the second round of the Battle of Los Angeles began with a match between Quicksilver and Rocky Romero. Quicksilver countered a roll-up attempt by Romero by pinning him with a double leg cradle for the win.

James Gibson took on Chris Bosh in the next second round match. Bosh insulted Gibson before the match which led to Gibson respond Bosh by kicking him in the gut. Gibson was about to deliver a Gibson Driver to Bosh nearing the climax of the match but Joey Ryan and Scott Lost interfered and distracted Gibson, allowing Bosh to roll-him up.

In the next second round match, American Dragon took on Christopher Daniels. Dragon countered an Angel's Wings by Daniels with a backdrop and hit a forearm smash to Daniels and then hit Daniels with twenty-five airplane spins and then applied a crossface chickenwing to Daniels to make him submit to the hold. After the match, Dragon demanded a shot at Daniels' TNA X Division Championship but Daniels refused the title shot with the excuse that the referee considered it a submission while he was attempting to get out of the hold.

It was followed by the last match in the second round between the PWG Champion Kevin Steen and AJ Styles. Styles knocked Steen from the top rope with a fireman's carry neckbreaker and then nailed a Spiral Tap to Steen for the win.

Next, NOSAWA and Samoa Joe took on Kikutaro and Top Gun Talwar in a tag team match. Joe knocked out Talwar with a STJoe from the corner and then raked Kikutaro in the eye and hit Talwar with a muscle buster from the top rope. After the match, PWG Commissioners SoCal Val and Dino Winwood threatened to fire Joey Ryan and Scott Lost if they continued to attack wrestlers. Ryan and Lost confronted them and Winwood pushed Lost, allowing Ryan to superkick Val.

It was followed by the semifinal round of the tournament. The first semifinal took place between Quicksilver and Chris Bosh. Bosh hit a vertical suplex piledriver to Quicksilver for the win.

The next semifinal took place between AJ Styles and American Dragon. Styles countered an airplane spin by Dragon and pinned him with an inside cradle for the win.

Later, the penultimate match of the event took place as El Generico, Frankie Kazarian, Jack Evans and Super Dragon took on Davey Richards, Joey Ryan, Ricky Reyes and Scott Lost in an eight-man tag team match. Dragon attempted to nail a Psycho Driver to Richards but Reyes tried to pull him off outside the ring and Evans dived off the ropes onto Reyes on the floor which allowed Dragon to deliver a Psycho Driver to Richards for the win.

It was followed by the Battle of Los Angeles tournament final between AJ Styles and Chris Bosh. Bosh blocked a Spiral Tap by Styles with his knees and hit two vertical suplex piledrivers to Styles for the win.

== Reception ==
Brad Garoon of 411Mania rated the event 6.5 out of 10. He appreciated the Rocky Romero versus Frankie Kazarian and American Dragon versus Ricky Reyes matches in the first round, while "the first round was kind of a bust" and the eight-man tag team match on the second night "completely outshined everything in the tournament". According to Garoon, both nights "as a whole are solid, but a lot to get through without much waiting for you at the end."

== Aftermath ==
As a result of winning the inaugural Battle of Los Angeles Tournament, Chris Bosh earned a PWG Championship title shot against Kevin Steen at After School Special. Bosh had initially won the title but the original referee regained consciousness and disqualified Bosh for attacking him, thus reversing the decision and Steen subsequently retained the title. This led to Bosh getting a rematch against Steen due to their match not ending in a proper way and AJ Styles was added into their title match for having pinned Steen in the Battle of Los Angeles tournament, thus setting up a three-way match between Steen, Styles and Bosh for the title at Straight To DVD, where Steen retained the title.

Scorpio Sky's attack on Scott Lost at Battle of Los Angeles led to a match between the two at After School Special, which Lost won.

== Results ==
Night 1 (September 3)
No.	Results	Stipulations	Times
1	Gunning For Hookers (Hook Bomberry and Top Gun Talwar) and Human Tornado (with Ed Powers) defeated Chris Sabin, Disco Machine and Excalibur	Six-man tag team match	15:08
2	Rocky Romero defeated Frankie Kazarian	Battle of Los Angeles tournament first round match	11:02
3	Quicksilver defeated Davey Richards	Battle of Los Angeles tournament first round match	10:55
4	James Gibson defeated Joey Ryan	Battle of Los Angeles tournament first round match	15:59
5	Chris Bosh defeated El Generico (with Human Tornado)	Battle of Los Angeles tournament first round match	12:42
6	American Dragon defeated Ricky Reyes via submission	Battle of Los Angeles tournament first round match	19:19
7	Christopher Daniels defeated Scott Lost	Battle of Los Angeles tournament first round match	14:18
8	AJ Styles defeated Jack Evans	Battle of Los Angeles tournament first round match	13:35
9	Kevin Steen defeated Super Dragon	Battle of Los Angeles tournament first round match	33:02

Night 2 (September 4)
No.	Results	Stipulations	Times
1	Chris Sabin, Hook Bomberry and T. J. Perkins (with Ed Powers) defeated Disco Machine, Excalibur and Ronin	Six-man tag team match	7:08
2	Quicksilver defeated Rocky Romero	Battle of Los Angeles tournament second round match	13:08
3	Chris Bosh defeated James Gibson	Battle of Los Angeles tournament second round match	10:40
4	American Dragon defeated Christopher Daniels via submission	Battle of Los Angeles tournament second round match	18:24
5	AJ Styles defeated Kevin Steen	Battle of Los Angeles tournament second round match	7:02
6	NOSAWA and Samoa Joe defeated Kikutaro and Top Gun Talwar	Tag team match	11:35
7	Chris Bosh defeated Quicksilver	Battle of Los Angeles tournament semi-final round match	14:49
8	AJ Styles defeated American Dragon	Battle of Los Angeles tournament semi-final round match	20:21
9	El Generico, Frankie Kazarian, Jack Evans and Super Dragon defeated Davey Richards, Joey Ryan, Ricky Reyes and Scott Lost	Eight-man tag team match	19:47
10	Chris Bosh defeated AJ Styles	Battle of Los Angeles tournament final	5:43

=== Tournament brackets ===
Battle of Los Angeles (2005)
Tournament information
- Sport: Professional wrestling
- Location: Los Angeles, California
- Dates: September 3, 2005–September 4, 2005
- Tournament format: Single elimination tournament
- Participants: 16

Final positions
- Champion: Chris Bosh
- Runner-up: AJ Styles

The first annual Battle of Los Angeles was held on September 3 and 4, 2005, in Los Angeles, California.

First round
Frankie Kazarian	Pin
Rocky Romero	11:02
Quicksilver	Pin
Davey Richards	10:55
James Gibson	Pin
Joey Ryan	15:59
Chris Bosh	Pin
El Generico	12:42
American Dragon	Sub
Ricky Reyes	19:19
Christopher Daniels	Pin
Scott Lost	14:18
Jack Evans	Pin
A.J. Styles	13:35
Kevin Steen	Pin
Super Dragon	33:02

Second round
Rocky Romero	Pin
Quicksilver	13:08
James Gibson	Pin
Chris Bosh	10:40
American Dragon	Sub
Christopher Daniels	18:24
A.J. Styles	Pin
Kevin Steen	07:02

Semifinals
Quicksilver	Pin
Chris Bosh	14:49
American Dragon	Pin
A.J. Styles	20:01

Finals
Chris Bosh	Pin
A.J. Styles	05:43
