= Chris Bosh (wrestler) =

American professional wrestler

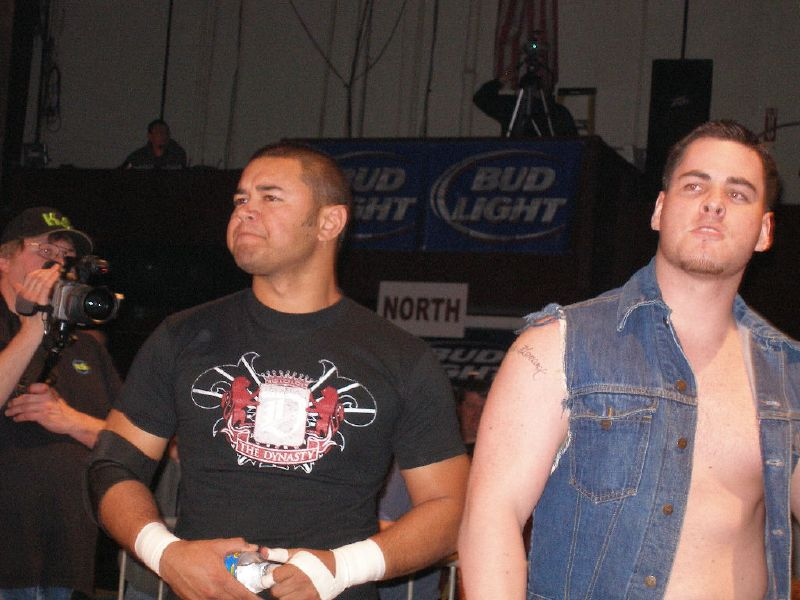
- Bosh (right) with Scott Lost

Personal information
- Born: Christopher Hancock Beverly Hills, California

Professional wrestling career
- Ring name(s): Chris Bosh; Coco the Mime
- Billed height: 5 ft 11 in (1.80 m)
- Billed weight: 195 lb (88 kg)
- Billed from: Beverly Hills, California
- Trained by: American Wild Child
- Debut: November 2002
- Retired: July 6, 2008

Christopher Hancock is an American retired professional wrestler. He is best known for his tenure in Pro Wrestling Guerrilla under the ring name Chris Bosh, where he was a three time PWG World Tag Team Champion.

== Professional wrestling career ==
=== Revolution Pro Wrestling ===
Hancock started off his career training in the Revolution Pro Rudos Dojo. He would make his professional debut in November 2002 in the "Fight For The Revolution" Battle Royal, under the ring name Chris Bosh. Bosh started his career as a clean cut babyface but would soon turn heel and join up with Rising Son and Disco Machine to form the Aggressive Thrill Attraction (A.T.A.), in Revolution Pro Wrestling. They feuded with The Aerial Xpress (Scorpio Sky and Quicksilver) as well as Super Dragon. Chris Bosh would go on to defeat Super Dragon for the Mexican Lucha Libre Heavyweight Championship, RPW's main title. He would remain champion until the company's final show, where he lost the championship to Top Gun Talwar.

=== Pro Wrestling Guerilla ===
Bosh competed at PWG's first show on July 26, 2003, losing to Excalibur. Bosh teamed with Quicksilver in the Tango & Cash Invitational tournament, being defeated by Joey Ryan and Scott Lost in the quarter-finals. They did however win the PWG Tag Team Championship three shows later from Ryan and Lost, but could only hold them until the following show, where they were defeated by Super Dragon and Excalibur. At The Next Show the current PWG Tag Team Championship Lost and Ryan had a ladder match to determine which one would hold the tag team championship. Lost won the match and chose Bosh as his partner. The team called themselves Arrogance.

They had a dominant reign, and became the longest reigning champions in company history after holding the title for 273 days, a record that would be broken by The Young Bucks in 2009. During their reign, Arrogance joined with Lost's former partner Joey Ryan. Along with Scott Lost, Bosh would help Joey Ryan win a number of his matches, including one for the World Championship. At The 2nd Annual PWG Bicentennial Birthday Extravaganza - Night One, Arrogance lost the Tag Team Title to Quicksilver and Scorpio Sky in a titles vs. masks match.

On September 3 and 4, 2005, Bosh competed in and won the inaugural Battle of Los Angeles tournament after defeating El Generico, James Gibson, and Quicksilver en route to the finals, where he defeated A.J. Styles. Bosh went on to challenge then-PWG Champion Kevin Steen at After School Special, where Bosh managed to pin Steen, but was unable to win the title after the referee, who had earlier been accidentally knocked out by Bosh, called for a disqualification finish. Bosh failed on multiple attempts to capture the PWG Championship from Steen and Joey Ryan over the next two years.

In early 2006, Chris Bosh once again began pursuing the World Tag Team Championship with Lost. They faced champions Super Dragon and Davey Richards on February 19, 2006, at European Vacation - England, but were unable to regain the title. In a rematch at Enchantment Under the Sea on May 20, 2006, lost and Bosh regained the title with help from Joey Ryan and Scorpio Sky. The four men then formed a faction called The Dynasty. They held the title until October 6, when they lost them to Super Dragon and B-Boy.

On May 20 and 21, 2007, the Dynamite Duumvirate Tag Team Title Tournament was held to crown new World Tag Team Champions after Cape Fear (El Generico and Quicksilver) were stripped of the title due to an injury. Arrogance took part in the tournament, but were eliminated in the first round by the Muscle Outlaw'z (Naruki Doi and Masato Yoshino).

=== Retirement ===
During July 2007, Bosh announced that he would be taking a hiatus from professional wrestling. On July 6, 2008, Bosh made a one-night only comeback at PWG's fifth anniversary show Life During Wartime where he was defeated by his former Dynasty teammate Scorpio Sky.

== Personal life ==
Bosh now lives in Texas with his wife and owns a farm.

== Championships and accomplishments ==
- Pro Wrestling Guerrilla
  - PWG World Tag Team Championship (3 times) – with Quicksilver (1) and Scott Lost (2)
  - Battle of Los Angeles (2005)
- Pro Wrestling Illustrated
  - PWI ranked him #299 of the 500 best singles wrestlers of the year in the PWI 500 in 2007
- Revolution Pro Wrestling
  - RPW Mexican Lucha Libre Heavyweight Championship (1 time)
- SoCal Uncensored
  - Match of the Year (2005) with Scott Lost vs. Quicksilver and Scorpio Sky, July 9, 2005, The 2nd Annual PWG Bicentennial Birthday Extravaganza - Night One
  - Tag Team of the Year (2005) with Scott Lost

=== Luchas de Apuestas record ===
Winner (wager)	Loser (wager)	Location	Event	Date	Notes
Excalibur (mask)	Chris Bosh (hair)	Los Angeles, California	Pimpin' In High Places	December 13, 2003	
Quicksilver and Scorpio Sky (masks)	Chris Bosh and Scott Lost (Championship)	Los Angeles, California	PWG Live event	July 9, 2005	
