= List of PWG World Tag Team Champions =

List of professional wrestling tag team champions

The PWG World Tag Team Championship was a professional wrestling world tag team championship owned and copyrighted by the Pro Wrestling Guerrilla (PWG) promotion; it is contested for in their tag team division. The championship was created and debuted on January 25, 2004, at PWG's Tango & Cash Invitational – Night Two event. Originally called the PWG Tag Team Championship, the title was renamed to the PWG World Tag Team Championship in February 2006 after the title was defended outside the United States for the first and second time, when that month then-champions Davey Richards and Super Dragon defeated Cape Fear (El Generico and Quicksilver) in Essen, Germany at European Vacation – Germany and Arrogance (Chris Bosh and Scott Lost) in Orpington, England at European Vacation – England. The championship was later won for the first time outside the United States on October 27, 2007, at PWG's European Vacation II – England event—at that event, then-champions El Generico and Kevin Steen were defeated by Richards and Super Dragon in Portsmouth, England. On June 16, 2017, Penta el Zero M and Rey Fenix successfully defended the title in Ciudad Nezahualcóyotl, Mexico.

Title reigns are determined either by professional wrestling matches between different wrestlers involved in pre-existing scripted feuds and storylines, or by scripted circumstances. Wrestlers are portrayed as either villains or heroes as they follow a series of tension-building events, which culminate in a wrestling match or series of matches for the championship. All title changes happen at live events, which are released on DVD. The inaugural champions were B-Boy and Homicide, whom PWG recognized to have become the champions after defeating The American Dragon and Super Dragon in the finals of the Tango & Cash Invitational Tag Team Tournament on January 25, 2004, at PWG's Tango & Cash Invitational – Night Two event. As of September 2026, The Young Bucks (Matt and Nick Jackson) hold the record for most reigns, with four. Super Dragon holds the record for most reigns by a single competitor, with six. PWG publishes a list of successful championship defenses (victories against challengers for the championship) for each champion on their official website, unlike major professional wrestling promotions. As of September 2026, The Young Bucks (Matt and Nick Jackson) have the most defenses, with 15; Twelve teams are tied for having the least, with 0. At 645 days and counting, the Rascalz (Zachary Wentz and Dezmond Xavier) are the longest reigning champions in their first reign. The Unbreakable F'n Machines' (Brian Cage and Michael Elgin) only reign, Monster Mafia's (Ethan Page and Josh Alexander) only reign and the Beaver Boys' (Alex Reynolds and John Silver) only reign share the record for the shortest in the title's history at less than one day. Overall, there have been 37 reigns, among 40 different wrestlers and 28 different teams, and four vacancies.

== Title history ==
=== Names ===
Name	Years
PWG Tag Team Championship	January 2004 – February 2006
PWG World Tag Team Championship	February 2006 – present

=== Reigns ===
Key
No.	Overall reign number
Reign	Reign number for the specific team—reign numbers for the individuals are in parentheses, if different
Days	Number of days held
Defenses	Number of successful defenses
<1	Reign lasted less than a day
+	Current reign is changing daily

No.	Champion	Championship change			Reign statistics			Notes	Ref.
No.	Champion	Date	Event	Location	Reign	Days	Defenses	Notes	Ref.
1	B-Boy and Homicide	January 25, 2004	Tango & Cash Invitational – Night Two	Santa Ana, CA	1	28	0	B-Boy and Homicide defeated The American Dragon and Super Dragon in the finals of the Tango & Cash Invitational Tag Team Tournament to become the inaugural champions.	
2	The X–Foundation (Joey Ryan and Scott Lost)	February 22, 2004	Taste The Radness!	Santa Ana, CA	1	34	0		
3	Chris Bosh and Quicksilver	March 27, 2004	Kee_ The _ee Out Of Our _ool!	Santa Ana, CA	1	21	0		
4	SBS (Excalibur and Super Dragon)	April 17, 2004	PWG The Musical	Santa Ana, CA	1	63	1		
5	The X–Foundation (Joey Ryan and Scott Lost)	June 19, 2004	Rocktoberfest	Santa Ana, California	2	77	0		
6	Arrogance (Chris Bosh (2) and Scott Lost (3))	October 9, 2004	Use Your Illusion III	Los Angeles, CA	1	273	9	Scott Lost defeated Joey Ryan in a ladder match at The Next Show for control of the title on September 4, but chose Bosh to be his partner at Use Your Illusion III on October 9.	
7	The Aerial Xpress (Quicksilver (2) and Scorpio Sky)	July 9, 2005	2nd Annual PWG Bicentennial Birthday Extravaganza – Night One	Los Angeles, CA	1	1	0	This was a Masks vs. Title match.	
—	Vacated	July 10, 2005	—	—	—	—	—	The Aerial Xpress were stripped of the championship as a result of Scorpio Sky taking a leave of absence from professional wrestling.	
8	2 Skinny Black Guys (El Generico and Human Tornado)	August 6, 2005	Zombies (Shouldn't Run)	Los Angeles, CA	1	56	1	2SBG defeated Arrogance (Chris Bosh and Scott Lost) to win the vacant championship.	
9	Davey Richards and Super Dragon (2)	October 1, 2005	After School Special	Los Angeles, CA	1	231	12	The title was renamed from the "PWG Tag Team Championship" to the "PWG World Tag Team Championship" following PWG's European Vacation tour of England and Germany in February 2006.	
10	Arrogance (Chris Bosh (3) and Scott Lost (4))	May 20, 2006	Enchantment Under the Sea	Los Angeles, CA	2	139	2		
11	B-Boy (2) and Super Dragon (3)	October 6, 2006	Self–Titled	Reseda, Los Angeles, CA	1	42	1		
12	Davey Richards (2) and Roderick Strong	November 17, 2006	All Star Weekend IV – Night One	Reseda, Los Angeles, CA	1	1	0		
13	B-Boy (3) and Super Dragon (4)	November 18, 2006	All Star Weekend IV – Night Two	Reseda, Los Angeles, CA	2	14	0	This was a four-way match, also involving The Kings of Wrestling (Chris Hero and Claudio Castagnoli) and The Motor City Machine Guns (Alex Shelley and Chris Sabin).	
14	Cape Fear (El Generico (2) and Quicksilver (3))	December 2, 2006	Passive Hostility	Reseda, Los Angeles, CA	1	98	2		
—	Vacated	March 10, 2007	—	—	—	—	—	Cape Fear were stripped of the championship as a result of Quicksilver sustaining a career-ending injury.	
15	Pac and Roderick Strong (2)	May 20, 2007	Dynamite Duumvirate Tag Team Title Tournament – Night 2	Burbank, CA	1	70	1	Pac and Strong defeated The Briscoe Brothers (Jay and Mark Briscoe) in the finals of the Dynamite Duumvirate Tag Team Title Tournament to win the vacant championship.	
16	El Generico (3) and Kevin Steen	July 29, 2007	Giant–Size Annual #4	Burbank, CA	1	90	2		
17	Davey Richards (3) and Super Dragon (5)	October 27, 2007	European Vacation II – England	Portsmouth, Hampshire, England	2	92	1		
—	Vacated	January 27, 2008	—	—	—	—	—	Davey Richards and Super Dragon were stripped of the championship after they failed to defend it on three separate occasions against The Dynasty (Joey Ryan and Scott Lost).	
18	The Dynasty (Joey Ryan (3) and Scott Lost (5))	January 27, 2008	Pearl Habra	La Habra Heights, CA	3	54	3	The Dynasty (formerly The X–Foundation) were awarded the vacant championship.	
19	El Generico (4) and Kevin Steen	March 21, 2008	1.21 Gigawatts	Reseda, Los Angeles, CA	2	58	2		
20	Jack Evans and Roderick Strong (3)	May 18, 2008	Dynamite Duumvirate Tag Team Title Tournament – Night 2	Burbank, CA	1	49	0		
21	The Age of the Fall (Jimmy Jacobs and Tyler Black)	July 6, 2008	Life During Wartime	Reseda, Los Angeles, CA	1	56	0	El Generico filled in for Jack Evans, who was unable to appear at the event.	
22	The Young Bucks (Matt Jackson and Nick Jackson)	August 31, 2008	All-Star Weekend VII – Night Two	Reseda, Los Angeles, CA	1	616	15		
23	¡Peligro Abejas! (El Generico (5) and Paul London)	May 9, 2010	DDT4	Reseda, Los Angeles, CA	1	335	5		
24	The Young Bucks (Matt Jackson and Nick Jackson)	April 9, 2011	Card Subject to Change III	Reseda, Los Angeles, CA	2	245	5	Ricochet filled in for Paul London, who was unable to appear at the event.	
25	Appetite for Destruction (Kevin Steen (3) and Super Dragon (6))	December 10, 2011	Fear	Reseda, Los Angeles, CA	1	167	0	This was a Guerrilla Warfare match.	
—	Vacated	May 25, 2012	Death to All But Metal	Reseda, Los Angeles, CA	—	—	—	Kevin Steen and Super Dragon vacated the title due to Dragon being sidelined with a fractured heel.	
26	Super Smash Brothers (Player Uno and Stupefied)	May 25, 2012	Death to All But Metal	Reseda, Los Angeles, CA	1	232	2	Super Smash Brothers defeated The Young Bucks (Matt Jackson and Nick Jackson) in a No Disqualification match to win the vacant championship.	
27	Unbreakable F'n Machines (Brian Cage and Michael Elgin)	January 12, 2013	DDT4	Reseda, Los Angeles, CA	1	<1	0		
28	The Young Bucks (Matt Jackson and Nick Jackson)	January 12, 2013	DDT4	Reseda, Los Angeles, CA	3	561	5		
29	World's Cutest Tag Team (Candice LeRae and Joey Ryan (4))	July 27, 2014	Eleven	Reseda, Los Angeles, CA	1	299	3	This was a Guerrilla Warfare match.	
30	Monster Mafia (Ethan Page and Josh Alexander)	May 22, 2015	DDT4	Reseda, Los Angeles, CA	1	<1	0		
31	Beaver Boys (Alex Reynolds and John Silver)	May 22, 2015	DDT4	Reseda, Los Angeles, CA	1	<1	0		
32	Andrew Everett and Trevor Lee	May 22, 2015	DDT4	Reseda, Los Angeles, CA	1	35	0		
33	The Young Bucks (Matt Jackson and Nick Jackson)	June 26, 2015	Mystery Vortex III: Rock & Shock the Nation	Reseda, Los Angeles, CA	4	631	6		
34	Lucha Brothers (Penta el Zero M and Rey Fenix)	March 18, 2017	Nice Boys (Don't Play Rock 'n Roll)	Reseda, Los Angeles, CA	1	216	2	This was a three-way match, also involving Matt Sydal and Ricochet.	
35	The Chosen Bros (Jeff Cobb and Matt Riddle)	October 20, 2017	All Star Weekend 13 – Night One	Reseda, Los Angeles, CA	1	182	1		
36	The Rascalz (Dezmond Xavier and Zachary Wentz)	April 20, 2018	All Star Weekend 14 – Night One	Reseda, Los Angeles, CA	1	1,255	8	This was a three-way match, also involving The Young Bucks (Matt and Nick Jackson).	
—	Vacated	September 26, 2021	—	—	—	—	—	Dezmond Xavier and Zachary Wentz vacated the title due to signing with WWE.	
37	The Kings of the Black Throne (Brody King and Malakai Black)	September 26, 2021	Threemendous VI	Los Angeles, CA	1	776	1	Defeated Black Taurus and Demonic Flamita to win the vacant titles.	
—	Deactivated	November 11, 2023	—	—	—	—	—	The championship was abandoned then PWG was closed.	

== Combined reigns ==
As of September 28, 2026.

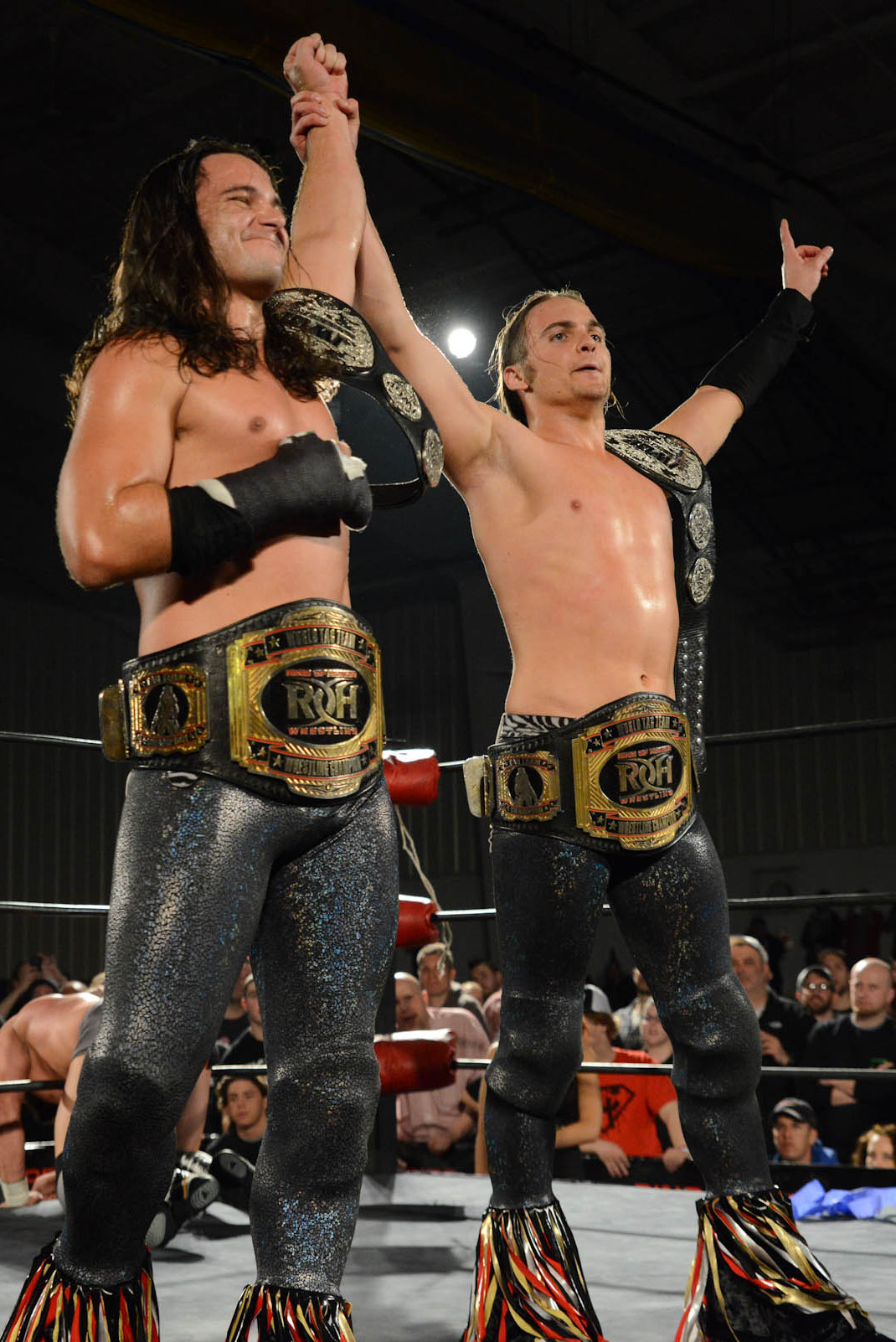
The Young Bucks (Matt Jackson (left) and Nick Jackson (right)), record four-time PWG World Tag Team Champions (in the picture, holding the IWGP Jr. Heavyweight Tag Team and ROH World Tag Team titles)

†	Indicates the current champions

=== By team ===
Rank	Team	No. of reigns	Combined defenses	Combined days
1	The Young Bucks (Matt Jackson and Nick Jackson)	4	31	2,053
2	The Rascalz (Dezmond Xavier and Zachary Wentz)	1	8	1,255
3	The Kings of the Black Throne (Brody King and Malakai Black)	1	1	776
4	Arrogance (Chris Bosh and Scott Lost)	2	11	412
5	¡Peligro Abejas! (El Generico and Paul London)	1	5	355
6	Davey Richards and Super Dragon	2	13	323
7	World's Cutest Tag Team (Candice LeRae and Joey Ryan)	1	3	299
8	Super Smash Brothers (Player Uno and Stupefied)	1	2	232
9	Lucha Brothers (Penta el Zero M and Rey Fenix)	1	2	216
10	The Chosen Bros (Jeff Cobb and Matt Riddle)	1	1	182
11	Appetite for Destruction (Kevin Steen and Super Dragon)	1	0	167
12	The X–Foundation/The Dynasty (Joey Ryan and Scott Lost)	3	3	165
13	Kevin Steen and El Generico	2	4	148
14	Cape Fear (El Generico and Quicksilver)	1	2	98
15	Pac and Roderick Strong	1	1	71
16	SBS (Excalibur and Super Dragon)	1	1	63
17	B-Boy and Super Dragon	2	1	56
17	2 Skinny Black Guys (El Generico and Human Tornado)	1	!	56
17	The Age of the Fall (Jimmy Jacobs and Tyler Black)	1	0	56
20	Jack Evans and Roderick Strong	1	0	49
21	Andrew Everett and Trevor Lee	1	0	35
22	B-Boy and Homicide	1	0	28
23	Chris Bosh and Quicksilver	1	0	21
24	The Aerial Xpress (Quicksilver and Scorpio Sky)	1	0	1
24	Davey Richards and Roderick Strong	1	0	1
26	Beaver Boys (Alex Reynolds and John Silver)	1	0	<1
26	Monster Mafia (Ethan Page and Josh Alexander)	1	0	<1
26	Unbreakable F'n Machines (Brian Cage and Michael Elgin)	1	0	<1

=== By wrestler ===
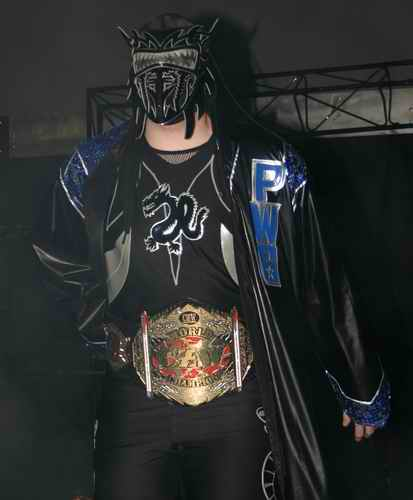
Super Dragon, a record six-time PWG World Tag Team Champion

Rank	Wrestler	No. of reigns	Combined defenses	Combined days
1	Matt Jackson	4	31	2,053
1	Nick Jackson	4	31	2,053
3	Dezmond Xavier	1	8	1,255
3	Zachary Wentz	1	8	1,255
5	Brody King	1	1	776
5	Malakai Black	1	1	776
7	El Generico	5	12	637
8	Super Dragon	6	15	609
9	Scott Lost	5	14	578
10	Joey Ryan	4	6	464
11	Chris Bosh	3	11	433
12	Paul London	1	5	335
13	Davey Richards	3	13	324
14	Kevin Steen	3	4	315
15	Candice LeRae	1	3	299
16	Player Uno	1	2	232
16	Stupefied	1	2	232
18	Penta el Zero M	1	2	216
18	Rey Fenix	1	2	216
20	Jeff Cobb	1	1	182
20	Matt Riddle	1	1	182
22	Roderick Strong	3	1	121
23	Quicksilver	3	2	120
24	B-Boy	3	1	84
25	Pac	1	1	71
26	Excalibur	1	1	63
27	Human Tornado	1	1	56
27	Jimmy Jacobs	1	0	56
27	Tyler Black	1	0	56
30	Jack Evans	1	0	49
31	Andrew Everett	1	0	35
31	Trevor Lee	1	0	35
33	Homicide	1	0	28
34	Scorpio Sky	1	0	1
35	Alex Reynolds	1	0	<1
35	Brian Cage	1	0	<1
35	Ethan Page	1	0	<1
35	John Silver	1	0	<1
35	Josh Alexander	1	0	<1
35	Michael Elgin	1	0	<1

== Notes ==
1. – Arrogance's reign as a tag team officially began on October 9, but Lost's third reign officially began on September 4.
2. – Though the event "Eleven" started on July 26, 2014, the title change took place after midnight on July 27.
3. – Each reign is ranked highest to lowest; reigns with the exact number mean that they are tied for that certain rank.
