= B-Boy (wrestler) =

Filipino American professional wrestler

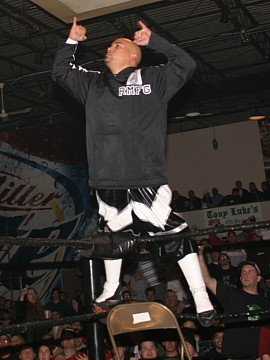
- B-Boy in 2004.

Personal information
- Born: Benito Cuntapay; December 29, 1978 (age 47) San Diego, California, United States

Professional wrestling career
- Ring name(s): B-Boy; Bael; Benny Chong; Delikado
- Billed height: 5 ft 10 in (1.78 m)
- Billed weight: 200 lb (91 kg)
- Billed from: San Diego, California
- Trained by: Christopher Daniels; Cory Van Kleeck; Kevin Quin; Rich Frisk; Tom Howard
- Debut: 1998

Benito "Benny" Cuntapay (born December 29, 1978) is a Filipino American professional wrestler better known by his ring name, B-Boy. He is currently performing for the independent circuit. He is best known for his work in the in promotions like Combat Zone Wrestling (CZW), Pro Wrestling Guerrilla (PWG), Jersey All Pro Wrestling (JAPW) or Wrestling Society X (WSX). He is a CZW World Heavyweight Champion, one-time CZW Iron Man Champion and three-times PWG World Tag Team Champion (once with Homicide and twice with Super Dragon). He also won the CZW 2003 Best of the Best tournament and the PWG 2004 Tango & Cash Invitational tournament with Homicide. He also known for his time with Lucha Underground, where was Bael for, but was killed by Matanza as part of the storyline.

== Career ==
=== Training and independent circuit ===
After being trained by numerous wrestlers, including Christopher Daniels, Cuntapay began working on the independent circuit. Using the name Benny Chong, he quickly formed a tag team with "Funky" Billy Kim in Ultimate Pro Wrestling (UPW) known as "The Manilla Thrillaz". From 1999 to 2003, he worked for numerous promotions, including Revolution Pro Wrestling, EPIC Pro Wrestling and Golden State Championship Wrestling. He also wrestled for the United Independent Wrestling Alliance, where he won the UIWA Cruiserweight Championship.

In late 2003, B-Boy began working primarily for Combat Zone Wrestling, Jersey All Pro Wrestling, and Pro Wrestling Guerrilla, however, he still made numerous appearances for Southern California independent promotions. On July 18, 2003, he competed in the World Power Wrestling (WPW) "Best of the West Tournament", defeating Scorpio Sky and Disco Machine en route to the semi-finals, where his match against Lil' Cholo ended in a draw, sending both of them through to the finals. Cholo won the four-way final to win the tournament. A month later, on August 16, at an All Pro Wrestling (APW) show, B-Boy defeated James Choi to win the APW Worldwide Internet Championship. Less than a week later, he appeared for Major League Wrestling (MLW), teaming with Nosawa in a loss to Jose and Joel Maximo.

On January 31, 2004, B-Boy went to Essen, Germany to compete for the Germany-based promotion Westside Xtreme Wrestling, and lost to X-Dream in a four-way match that also contained Thumbtack Jack and Steve Douglas. In June he competed in the JCW J-Cup Tournament, making it to the final by defeating Chris Idol and Josh Daniels, before losing to Super Dragon. The next month, he made his first appearance for Ring of Honor (ROH), losing to Josh Daniels in the main event on July 17 at Do or Die III. On August 6, 2004, he competed in the WPW "Best of the West Tournament" for the second consecutive year, defeating Jardi Frantz in the final to win.

In 2005, B-Boy teamed up with Super Dragon, as "Team PWG", and entered Chikara's Tag World Grand Prix tournament. They defeated the "Mystery Team" of Glenn Spectre and Ken the Box in the first round, before losing to Team Osaka Pro, Ebessan and Billyken Kid, in the second. He also returned to ROH, defeating Kevin Steen in a singles match on February 19 at Do or Die IV, but losing a six-way, also containing Izzy, Steen, Deranged and Dixie, to Azrieal on March 5. He made his Pro-Pain Pro Wrestling (3PW) debut on June 18, 2005, defeating Ruckus. He made another appearance in ROH on October 29 at This Means War, losing to Colt Cabana.

In 2006, he returned to APW, losing to Mr. Prime Time at APW Gym Wars on April 1.

=== Combat Zone Wrestling (2003–2010, 2016-2019) ===
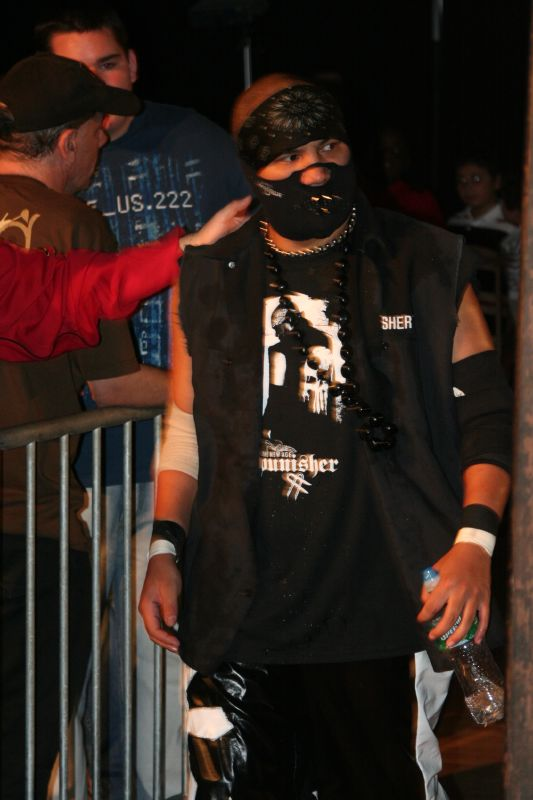
A masked B-Boy making his way to the ring in 2008.

In Combat Zone Wrestling (CZW), Cuntapay, using the name B-Boy, joined the Hi V faction, with Messiah and The Backseat Boys, managed by Dewey Donovan. On April 12, 2003, B-Boy defeated Deranged, Lil Cholo, Jay Briscoe and Sonjay Dutt to win the Best of the Best tournament. On July 20, Hi V turned on CZW owner John Zandig, leading to the rest of the roster chasing them out of the building. This allowed the Hi V members to take a short hiatus from CZW, and B-Boy returned on the show of October 11, Uprising, defeating Homicide. He continued working regularly throughout the end of 2003 and 2004, gaining numerous title matches, but failing to win them. On July 10, 2004, B-Boy competed in the fourth annual Best of the Best tournament in an attempt to win it for the second consecutive time, but lost to Roderick Strong in the quarter-finals. After another short hiatus from CZW, B-Boy defeated Dan Maff on December 11 to win the Xtreme Strong Style Tournament. This earned him a match that night against the CZW Iron Man Champion, Chris Hero, who he then defeated to win the championship. After successful defenses against Kaos, B-Boy lost the championship to Frankie The Mobster on February 5, 2005, at Only the Strong: Scarred for Life.

On April 2, 2005, B-Boy unsuccessfully challenged Ruckus for the CZW World Heavyweight Championship, and on May 14, he competed in the fifth Best of the Best tournament, making it to the finals, where he lost to Mike Quackenbush in a four-way match. On August 13, B-Boy lost a Loser Leaves Town match to Nate Webb, although he returned just under a month later on September 10, at the Chri$ Ca$h Memorial Show. After this, he competed only sporadically for CZW, making an appearance at the 2006 Chri$ Ca$h Memorial Show, and then, later that night, unsuccessfully challenging LuFisto for the CZW Iron Man Championship. He also competed in the seventh Best of the Best tournament on July 14, 2007, defeating Cheech, Ricochet, Brandon Thomaselli and Jigsaw en route to the final, where he lost to Joker.

On January 30, 2010, at High Stakes 4 – Sky's the Limit B-Boy won the CZW World Heavyweight Championship, by defeating the previous champion Drake Younger. He held the championship for two weeks, before losing it to Jon Moxley on February 13. B-Boy announced on his Twitter that he would be returning to CZW to face A. R. Fox. Later, it was announced that B-Boy would be facing Jonathan Gresham at Proving Grounds.

=== IWA Mid-South (2003–2007) ===
B-Boy first made appeared in Independent Wrestling Association Mid-South (IWA Mid-South) as part of the 2003 Ted Petty Invitational, defeating J.C. Bailey and Nigel McGuinness before losing to Chris Hero in the semifinals. He later appeared on April 9, 2004, in a loss to A.J. Styles. He also appeared the following night, when he defeated Chris Hero in a two out of three falls match that lasted 45 minutes. He continued to wrestle sporadically for IWA Mid-South throughout 2004, facing wrestlers including CM Punk, Petey Williams, and Alex Shelley.

At the start of 2005, B-Boy took a hiatus from IWA Mid-South, returning on April 29 at Revenge Served Cold, defeating Sal Thomaselli in a Tables, Ladders, and Chairs match, in what was his last match in IWA Mid-South for over a year. He made his return on September 29, 2006, losing to Arik Cannon in the first round of the Ted Petty Invitational tournament. He made further appearances in December 2006, and again in June 2007.

=== Jersey All Pro Wrestling ===
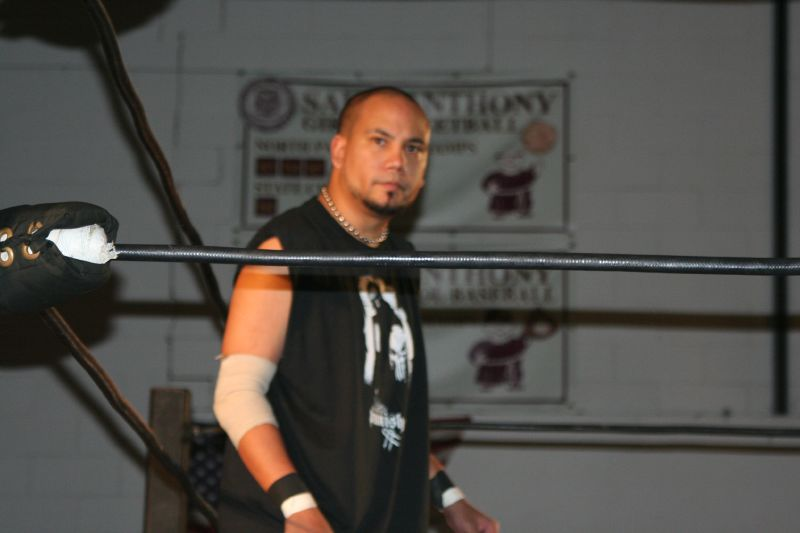
B-Boy at a JAPW show in November 2008.

On June 5, 2004, B-Boy debuted in Jersey All Pro Wrestling (JAPW), losing to Trent Acid, however, his second appearance was not until September 18 of that year, when he lost to Low Ki. In only his fourth appearance for the promotion on January 29, 2005, B-Boy and Homicide, collectively known as The Strong Style Thugs, defeated The Christopher Street Connection to win the JAPW Tag Team Championship. They held the championship for just under two months, before losing it to the team of Teddy Hart and Jack Evans in a steel cage match. After more sporadic appearances, B-Boy defeated Azrieal to win the JAPW Light Heavyweight Championship on June 4, 2005, however he was stripped of the title later that year.

He continued to make sporadic appearances until December 8, 2007, when he lost to Azrieal and Arcadia in what was billed as his retirement match. Despite that, he later returned to JAPW just under a year later, unsuccessfully challenging the JAPW Heavyweight Champion Kenny Omega. He later returned to wrestle New Jersey State Champion Bandido Jr. on January 24, 2009.

=== Pro Wrestling Guerrilla (2003–2006, 2009, 2011-2014) ===
In 2003, B-Boy made his Pro Wrestling Guerrilla (PWG) debut, defeating Tony Kozina on August 29. For the next year, he made few appearances, until November 2005, when he began competing for PWG on a regular basis. On November 15, he and Ronin challenged Davey Richards and Super Dragon for the PWG World Tag Team Championship in a losing effort. He then competed mainly in singles competition, taking on wrestlers including Chris Sabin, El Generico and Excalibur, with mixed results.

In mid-2006, he began competing for various championships in PWG, losing a World tag Team Championship match to Scott Lost and Chris Bosh with Human Tornado as his tag team partner, and he was defeated by the PWG World Champion, Joey Ryan in a Tables, Ladders and Chairs steel cage match. On October 7, he teamed with Super Dragon to win the PWG World Tag Team Championship from Lost and Bosh. After successful defenses against Chris Hero and Claudio Castagnoli, they lost the championship to Davey Richards and Roderick Strong on November 17. They won the championship back the next day, however, by winning a four-way match, also containing the teams of Alex Shelley and Chris Sabin, and Hero and Castagnoli. Their second title reign was also short-lived, however, as they lost the championship to El Generico and Quicksilver just over two weeks later on December 2.

== Championships and accomplishments ==
- Battleground Championship Wrestling
  - BCW Championship (1 time)
- 3-2-1 BATTLE!
  - 3-2-1 Solid Steel Championship (1 time)
  - Six Pack Challenge Tournament (2019)
- All Pro Wrestling
  - APW Worldwide Internet Championship (1 time)
- Alternative Wrestling Show
  - AWS Heavyweight Championship (1 time)
- Real Championship Wrestling
  - RCW Heavyweight Championship (1 time, inaugural)
  - RCW Heavyweight Title Tournament (2009)
- Battleground Pro Wrestling
  - BPW Ring Warrior Championship (1 time)
- California Championship Wrestling
  - CCW Cruiserweight Championship (1 time)
  - CCW Maximum Championship (1 time)
  - CCW Tag Team Championship (2 times) – with Al Katrazz
- Combat Zone Wrestling
  - CZW Iron Man Championship (1 time)
  - CZW World Heavyweight Championship (1 time)
  - Best of the Best (2003)
  - Xtreme Strong Style Tournament (2004)
  - CZW Hall of Fame (2019)
- Finest City Wrestling
  - FCW Heavyweight Championship (1 time)
- FIST Combat
  - FIST Heavyweight Championship (3 times)
- Jersey All Pro Wrestling
  - JAPW Light Heavyweight Championship (1 time)
  - JAPW Tag Team Championship (1 time) – with Homicide
- New Wave Pro Wrestling
  - NWPW Rapid Division Championship (1 time)
  - NWPW Heavyweight Championship (1 time)
- Pro Wrestling Guerrilla
  - PWG World Tag Team Championship (3 times) – with Homicide (1) and Super Dragon (2)
  - Tango & Cash Invitational (2004) – with Homicide
- Pro Wrestling Illustrated
  - PWI ranked him 206 of the top 500 singles wrestlers in the PWI 500 in 2009
- SoCalUncensored.com
  - Match of the Year (2001) vs. Super Dragon, November 3, Millennium Pro Wrestling
  - Match of the Year (2003) with Super Dragon vs. Jardi Frantz and Bobby Quance, March 29, Goldenstate Championship Wrestling
  - Match of the Year (2014) vs. Joey Kaos, July 25, AWS
  - Wrestler of the Year (2002, 2015)
  - Most Outstanding Wrestler (2017)
- Ultimate Pro Wrestling
  - UPW Light Heavyweight Championship (2 times)
  - UPW Tag Team Championship (1 time) – with Funky Billy Kim
- Union Independent Pro Wrestling
  - UIWA Cruiserweight Championship (1 time)
  - UIWA Tag Team Championship (1 time) - with Famous B
- World Power Wrestling
  - Best of the West Tournament (2004)
