= Human Tornado =

American professional wrestler (born 1983)

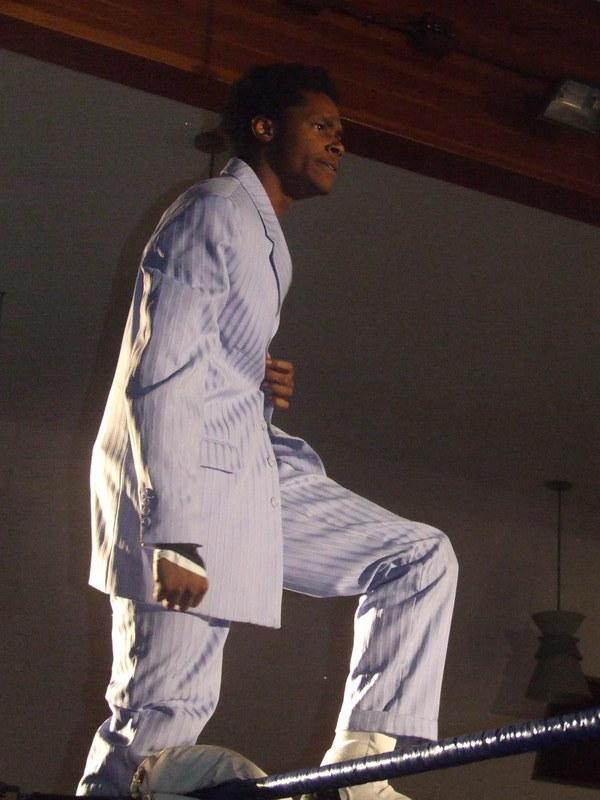
- Williams in 2007

Personal information
- Born: Craig Williams; May 1, 1983 (age 43) Hollywood, Alabama

Professional wrestling career
- Ring name(s): Human Tornado; El Negro; El Snowflake
- Billed height: 6 ft 3 in (1.91 m)
- Billed weight: 170 lb (77 kg)
- Billed from: Ejersa Goro, Harar, Ethiopia; Hollywood, Alabama
- Trained by: American Wild Child; Revolution Pro Wrestling
- Debut: November 29, 2003
- Retired: 2018

Craig Williams (born May 1, 1983), better known by his ring name, Human Tornado, is an American semi-retired professional wrestler. His character was that of a 1970s blaxploitation street pimp.

He performed primarily on the California independent circuit, most prominently for Pro Wrestling Guerrilla (PWG), Empire Wrestling Federation, and Alternative Wrestling Show. He also performed for Ring of Honor, Combat Zone Wrestling, Jersey All Pro Wrestling, and the short-lived MTV promotion Wrestling Society X.

Human Tornado is a former two-time PWG World Champion and one-time PWG World Tag Team Champion (with El Generico).

== Professional wrestling career ==
=== Pro Wrestling Guerrilla (2004–2010) ===
Five months after his professional wrestling debut on the Californian independent circuit, Human Tornado made his debut for Pro Wrestling Guerrilla on April 17, 2004, in a tag team match, where he and Supa Badd were defeated by Charles Mercury and Top Gun Talwar. On August 19, 2005, Tornado won his first Championship with the company, when he and El Generico, the team known collectively as the 2 Skinny Black Guys, defeated Arrogance of Chris Bosh and Scott Lost to win the vacant PWG Tag Team Championship. Two months later on October 1, Tornado and Generico lost the titles to the team of Super Dragon and Davey Richards. Afterwards Tornado went on to feud with the PWG World Champion Joey Ryan. During the feud Tornado defeated the World Champion twice in a row, but both times Ryan was able to walk away with his title, as the first victory came via countout and the second in a non-title match. In the second match Tornado appeared as El Snowflake, the character he portrayed in the Jack Black movie Nacho Libre. Finally, on January 13, 2007, Tornado defeated Ryan in a Guerrilla Warfare match to end his thirteen-month reign and win the PWG World Championship. However, his reign would turn out to be a short one, as just one month later, he lost the Championship to his former tag team partner El Generico. After the loss of his title Tornado turned heel and after losing a rematch to Generico on April 8, he laid the blame of losing the title on his newly found valet Candice LeRae. After months of abuse, LeRae finally turned on Tornado on September 1 and cost him his first round match in the 2007 Battle of Los Angeles tournament. After the match Tornado assaulted LeRae, who was then saved by Chris Hero, which began a long and heated feud between the two wrestlers.

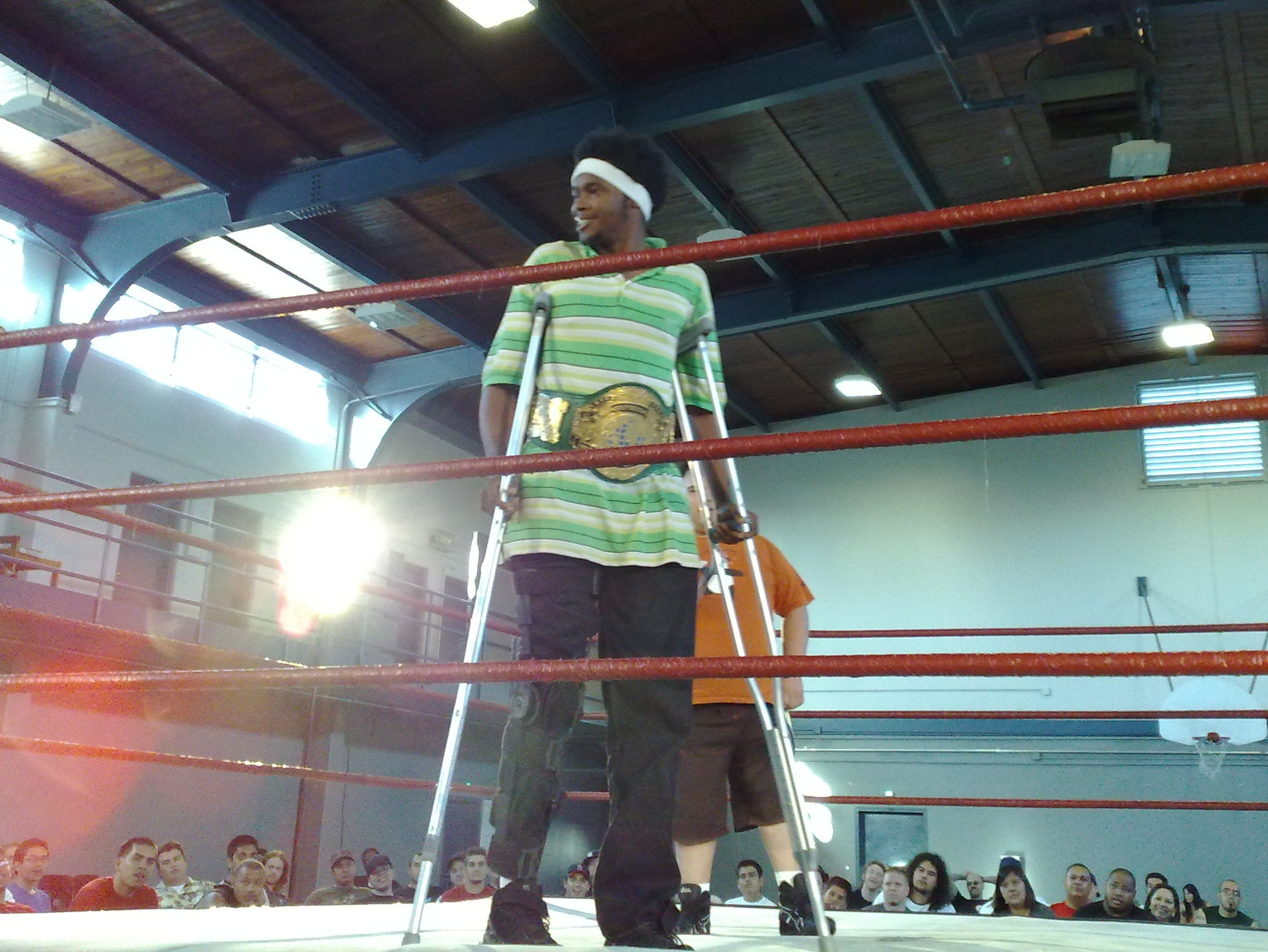
Human Tornado with the PWG World Championship on crutches after tearing his ACL in 2008

On October 14 Tornado defeated Hero in the first singles match of their feud. After Tornado and his allies Claudio Castagnoli and Eddie Kingston defeated Hero, LeRae and Necro Butcher in a no disqualification six person tag team match on January 5, 2008, Tornado received a one-on-one match against LeRae the following day and defeated her via disqualification when Hero interfered in the match. After PWG World Champion Low Ki suffered a knee injury, the title was vacated and put up for grabs in a five man tournament. On February 24, 2008, Tornado defeated first Necro Butcher in the first round and then Roderick Strong and Karl Anderson in a three-way final match to win the PWG World Championship for the second time. Shortly afterwards Tornado tore his ACL and dislocated his knee, while wrestling for Juggalo Championship Wrestling, and as a result, his in-ring time was significantly reduced during his second World Title run. After refusing to vacate the title, Tornado was ordered to defend it against the number one contender, Chris Hero, in a steel cage Guerrilla Warfare match on July 6, 2008, at PWG's fifth anniversary show, titled Life During Wartime. At the event Hero, with the help of LeRae, defeated Tornado to win the World Title, after which Tornado went on to heal his injuries.

Tornado returned to PWG on February 21, 2009, to cash in on his rematch clause against Hero in a three-way match, which also included Colt Cabana. After being pinned by Hero, Tornado, seemingly turning face, attempted to make peace with him, but got blown off. Tornado solidified his position as a face in May by re-forming the tag team Dark & Lovely with Scorpio Sky. The team entered the 2009 Dynamite Duumvirate Tag Team Title Tournament, but were defeated in the first round by the team of Kenny Omega and Chuck Taylor. On July 31 Tornado re-united with another former tag team partner, El Generico, and together the two of them defeated the PWG World Tag Team Champion The Young Bucks (Matt and Nick Jackson) in a non-title match at PWG's sixth anniversary show. However, at the following event the 2 Skinny Black Guys' dreams of regaining the Tag Team Championship were crushed as Chuck Taylor defeated El Generico in a number one contender's match. Tornado entered the 2009 Battle of Los Angeles contested for the vacant PWG World Championship, but was defeated in the quarterfinals of the tournament by Roderick Strong. On January 30, 2010, Tornado defeated Super Crazy in what would turn out to be his final match for the promotion, as on February 4, he suddenly announced his retirement from professional wrestling on his Facebook page. On February 27 at As the Worm Turns Tornado gave a retirement speech to the PWG audience.

=== Wrestling Society X (2006–2007) ===
In early 2006 Tornado took part in the tapings of the first season Wrestling Society X. The shows were taped in late 2006 and aired on MTV in 2007. At the tapings Tornado defeated Luke Hawx and was defeated by 6-Pac. He was also involved in a short feud with Jack Evans, which included a dance-off on WSXtra and a ten-minute time limit draw in the main event of the final episode of WSX.

=== Combat Zone Wrestling (2006–2007) ===
On October 14, 2006, Tornado made his debut for Combat Zone Wrestling as part of the stable BLKOUT. Tornado and Ruckus entered the tournament to crown the new CZW World Tag Team Champions, but were defeated in the second round by The Kings of Wrestling (Chris Hero and Claudio Castagnoli). After the match Ruckus and Sabian turned on Tornado and kicked him out of the BLKOUT. Later in the evening, after Nick Gage suffered an injury, Tornado took his place in the finals of the tournament, teaming up with Justice Pain, but was once again defeated by the Kings of Wrestling. On December 9 Ruckus defeated Tornado in a singles match. Tornado returned to CZW on July 14, 2007, to compete in the Best of the Best 7 tournament. He defeated Ruckus in the first round, but was defeated by Joker in the four-way semifinal match. On October 13, Tornado faced Ruckus in a ladder match for the CZW World Heavyweight Championship. Tornado managed to pull down the World Title, but the referee did not see it, due to being distracted by the rest of BLKOUT and in the end Ruckus was able to retain his title. After the match Tornado and Ruckus made peace and Tornado has not returned to the company since.

=== Juggalo Championship Wrestling (2007–2008) ===
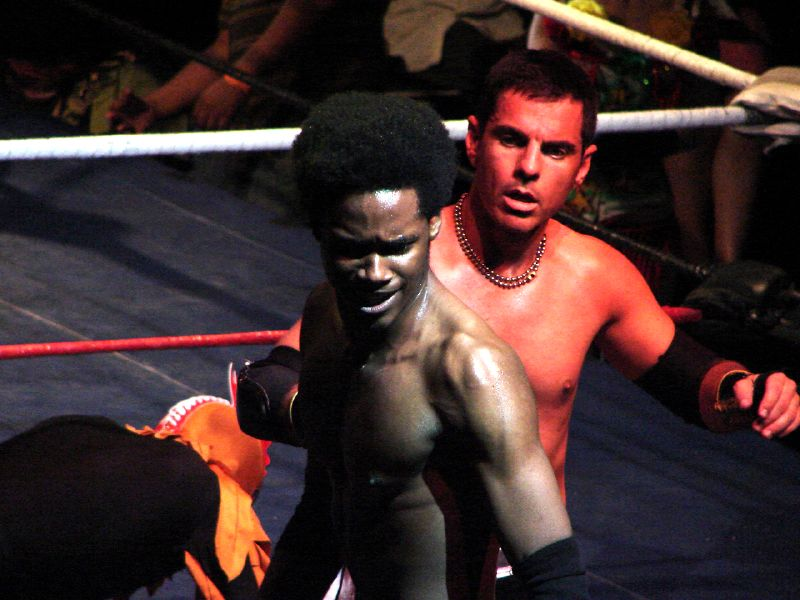
Human Tornado in 2006

Human Tornado debuted in Juggalo Championship Wrestling during the first season of SlamTV! at Westside Wars. Alongside tag team partner Nosawa, he defeated Mad Man Pondo and Necro Butcher. Tornado continued with a successful singles run through episode 11. The following week, he and Zach Gowen formed the tag team Pimp & Gimp Connection. The team made an immediate impact and earned themselves a spot in the 8 Team Tag-Team Elimination match for the JCW Tag Team Championship at Bloodymania. The team failed to capture the championship after Gowen was eliminated by Doug Basham.

In the following season, Gowen formed a new tag team with Conrad Kennedy, leaving Tornado to return to singles competition. In the second episode, Human Tornado saw heel manager Scott D'Amore leaving Kennedy's dressing room and grew suspicious. During the third episode, filmed on April 25, Tornado landed awkwardly while entering the ring and legitimately suffered severe injuries to his knee. The following week, Kennedy attacked Gowen after the team lost their match against The Bloody Brothers. Human Tornado ran into the ring to save Gowen, forcing Kennedy to retreat to the stage, where Scott D'Amore met with him. The following week, a match was set for Bloodymania II where Pimp & Gimp Connection were to take on Conrad Kennedy and a mystery partner. As a result of Gowen legitimately no-showing the event, the match was scrapped and Tornado teamed with The Weedman in a loss to JCW Tag Team Champions The Bloody Brothers (Ian and Lane).

=== Ring of Honor (2007–2008, 2010) ===
Human Tornado made his Ring of Honor debut on October 19, 2007 in Las Vegas, Nevada defeating Shane Hagadorn and Tony Kozina to make it to the 2007 Survival of the Fittest elimination match, where he was the first participant eliminated by the eventual winner, Chris Hero. Two nights later at the Cow Palace in San Francisco, California he lost to Chris Hero in a one on one match. He would compete at the ROH show "Reckless Abandon" in Dayton, Ohio on November 30, 2007, where he lost a three-way match with Davey Richards and Erick Stevens. Tornado was scheduled to appear on the December 1, 2007, ROH show in Chicago, Illinois (which was then called Trios Tournament 2007), but he, along with Jack Evans, Ruckus, and Necro Butcher, all got into a weather-related car accident on their way to the show. Jack suffered a concussion, but the other passengers were unharmed.

On February 22, 2008, in Long Island, New York, Tornado made his return to ROH in a four-way match won by Jason Blade. The following night in New York City he tagged with Delirious in a match, where they were defeated by The Age of the Fall (Jimmy Jacobs and Tyler Black). Almost two years later, on January 29, 2010, Tornado returned to ROH, when the company took part in WrestleReunion 4, competing in a match, where he was defeated by Kevin Steen. Tornado was advertised to take part in the February 5 and 6 tapings of Ring of Honor Wrestling, but his appearances were cancelled after he suddenly announced his retirement from professional wrestling the day before the first tapings. However, on March 26 he made a surprise return to the company, competing in a six-way match won by Colt Cabana. The following day he was defeated by Shawn Daivari in a singles match. According to reports Tornado wrestled the events to make up for the two shows he missed in February.

=== Return ===
On November 10, 2012 Human Tornado returned to CZW in a tag team match against BLK OUT. On April 4, 2013 Human Tornado made his in ring return at Pro Wrestling Syndicate's Super Card Night 1 in Metuchen, New Jersey.

On November 16, 2018, Tornado debuted for Game Changer Wrestling, in a losing effort against Penelope Ford at "Joey Janela's LA Confidential."

On October 21, 2021 Tornado faced off against Wrestler and Michael Jackson impersonator Santana Jackson at Lucha Wrestling Puroresu's Extreme Lucha Show in Santa Ana California. Tornado would go on to win the match by pinfall.

Current as of 2024, Craig Williams is touring with the Micro Mania Midget Wrestling tour.

== Other media ==
Williams appeared briefly in the 2006 sports-comedy film, Nacho Libre, as the luchador El Snowflake who competed in a battle royal, but did not succeed in winning. El Snowflake is based on Williams's Human Tornado gimmick, complete with similar ring gear, and the use of his real-life signature move, the House party (dubbed, the Snowflake kick).

== Championships and accomplishments ==
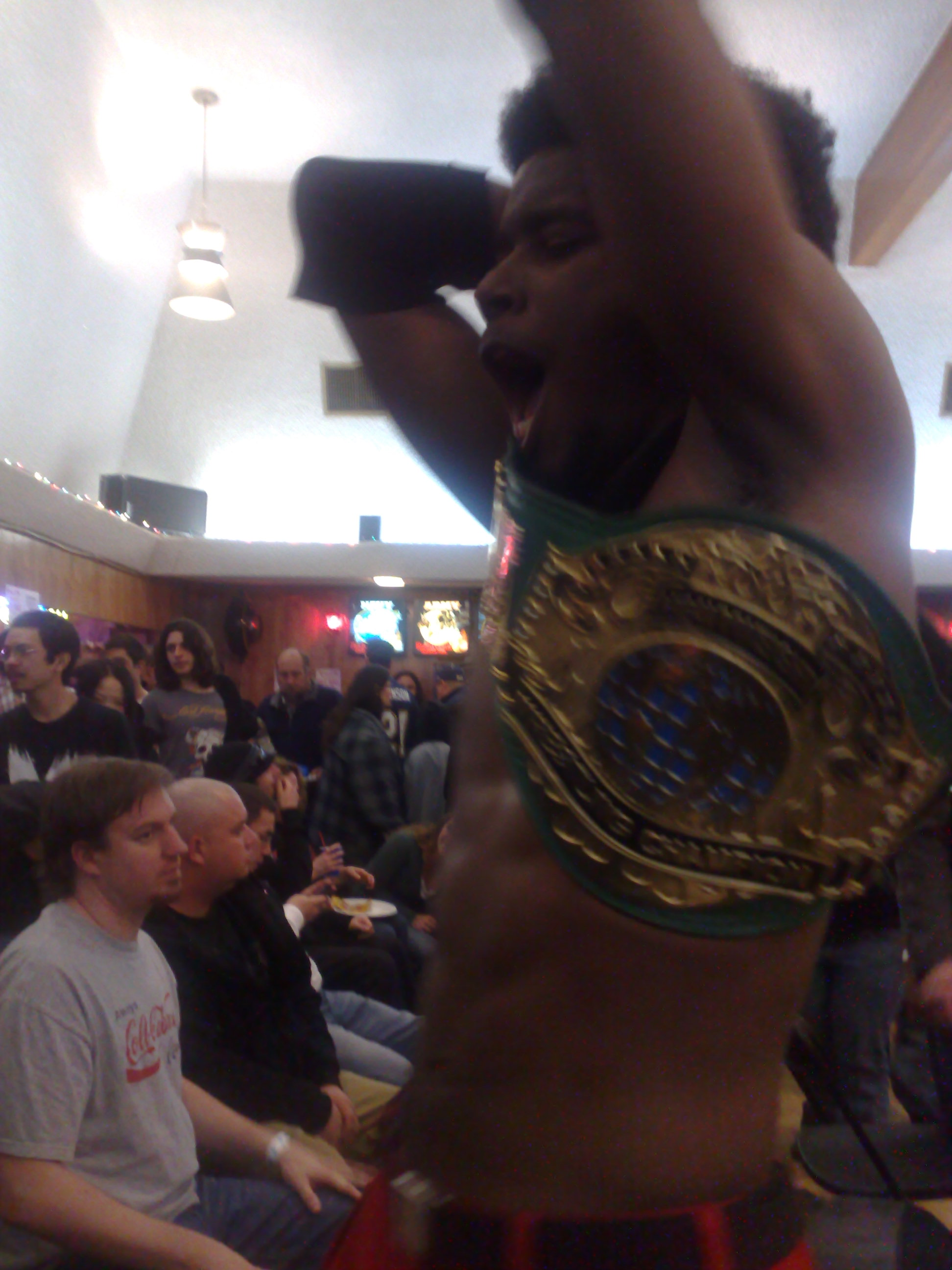
Human Tornado during his second reign as the PWG World Champion.

- Alternative Wrestling Show
  - AWS Heavyweight Championship (1 time)
  - AWS Lightweight Championship (1 time)
- Empire Wrestling Federation
  - EWF American Championship (1 time)
- Pro Wrestling Guerrilla
  - PWG World Championship (2 times)
  - PWG Tag Team Championship (1 time) – with El Generico
  - ¡Dia de los Dangerous! (2008)
- Pro Wrestling Illustrated
  - PWI ranked him #179 of the top 500 singles wrestlers in the PWI 500 in 2009
- Revolution Pro Wrestling
  - Revolution Pro Junior Heavyweight Championship (1 time)
- SoCal Uncensored
  - Rookie of the Year (2004)
- Underground Empire Wrestling
  - UEW Internet Television Championship (1 time)
  - UEW Tag Team Championship (2 time) – with Biggie Biggz and Jimi Mayhem
- Wrestling Superstars Unleashed
  - WSU Heavyweight Championship (1 time)
