= Super Dragon =

American professional wrestler (born 1980)

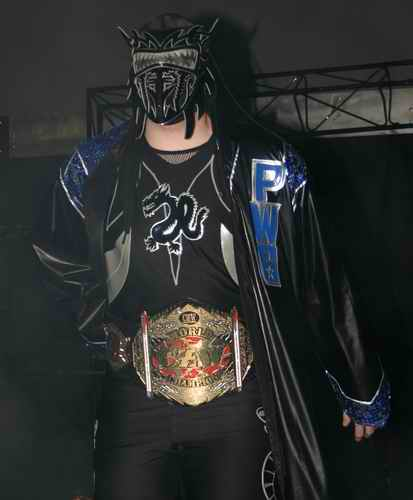
- Super Dragon as the CZW World Heavyweight Champion in 2006

Personal information
- Born: Daniel Caine Lyon; June 8, 1980 (age 46) Orange County, California

Professional wrestling career
- Ring name: Super Dragon
- Billed height: 6 ft 0 in (1.83 m)
- Billed weight: 225 lb (102 kg)
- Trained by: Martin Marin; Handsome Boy
- Debut: 1997

Daniel Caine Lyon (born June 8, 1980), better known by his ring name Super Dragon, is an American professional wrestler. Beginning his career in 1997, he has worked for companies such as All Pro Wrestling, Chikara, Combat Zone Wrestling (CZW), Ring of Honor (ROH), World Championship Wrestling (WCW), Pro Wrestling Guerrilla (PWG) and Xtreme Pro Wrestling (XPW).

Super Dragon is one of six founders of the Southern California-based promotion Pro Wrestling Guerrilla. He is a former PWG World Champion and a record six-time PWG World Tag Team Champion, having held the title twice with B-Boy and Davey Richards, and once with Excalibur and Kevin Steen.

== Professional wrestling career ==
=== Early career (1996–1999) ===
Super Dragon started training in 1996 in World Power Wrestling's wrestling school, where he was trained under owner Martin Marin. He had his first match in 1997 against Tiger Joe. Super Dragon became friends with Blitzkrieg, who during a tour of Mexico caught the eye of local wrestlers, such as Psicosis and Juventud Guerrera, who were also performing for World Championship Wrestling (WCW). Afterwards Blitzkrieg and Super Dragon were granted a dark match for WCW with the help of American Wild Child, who was friends with Konnan.

=== Revolution Pro Wrestling (1999–2004) ===
Super Dragon joined Revolution Pro Wrestling in 1999 and was part of the New Generation that hit Rev-Pro along with Disco Machine, TARO, Excalibur and Shogun. However, it was not long after that when Dragon tore his ACL and was forced to go for a reconstructive surgery in July 2000. Dragon made his return in January 2001 and reached his first real peak on September 28, 2001, when he defeated B-Boy in the finals of a sixteen-man tournament to win the Revolution J Tournament. During this time Dragon, along with other Rev-Pro stars were featured on a few Xtreme Pro Wrestling (XPW) shows. On October 25, 2002, at Pride of the Mask II, Super Dragon and Shogun defeated TARO and El Gallinero Tres in a tag team match, with the stipulation being that the two winners would later face each other in a Mask vs. Mask match. Super Dragon beat Shogun and claimed his mask. Throughout his Rev-Pro run, Dragon changed his wrestling style from high flying to brawling and his attire from various bright colors to darker colors. His feud with TARO was especially a heated one. After nearly a five-year battle in both Revolution Pro Wrestling and All Pro Wrestling the feud culminated in a Mask vs. Mask match at Rev-Pro's fourth anniversary show on November 11, 2003. Dragon defeated TARO, who after the match unmasked, announced his retirement and embraced Super Dragon. On May 12, 2004, at Revolution Pro's final show, Super Dragon was defeated by Mr. Excitement.

=== Combat Zone Wrestling (2002–2006) ===
Super Dragon started wrestling for Combat Zone Wrestling (CZW) in 2002 at Best of the Best 2 against longtime rival B-Boy. When he returned in 2004, he wrestled many tag team matches with partner Excalibur, and challenged Chris Hero for the Iron Man championship. In 2005, he was involved in a feud against BLKOUT. At Cage of Death 7, Dragon beat Ruckus for the CZW World Heavyweight Championship. This win made Super Dragon the first masked wrestler to hold the title. During the match, he gave BLKOUT manager Robbie Merino, who had already been injured previously by Super Dragon, a Curb Stomp onto the stage. At the next show, An Afternoon of Main Events, Dragon teamed with the Kings of Wrestling (who were also feuding with BLKOUT) in a six-man tag team match against BLKOUT, which they lost. Super Dragon lost the title back to Ruckus in February 2006 in a match also involving Kevin Steen.

=== Pro Wrestling Guerrilla (2003–2024) ===
In May 2003 Super Dragon along with Disco Machine, Excalibur, Joey Ryan, Scott Lost and Top Gun Talwar, collectively known as the "PWG Six", founded Pro Wrestling Guerrilla, SoCal's largest wrestling promotion. At PWG's debut show on July 26, 2003, he defeated M-Dogg 20. The next two PWG shows featured the Badass Mother 3000 tournament to determine the first PWG Champion. Super Dragon got to the semifinals, but was then eliminated by Joey Ryan.

In PWG Super Dragon re-formed the faction known in Revolution Pro as Team Chismo with Excalibur and Disco Machine, under the new name S.B.S. At PWG...The Musical, held on April 17, 2004, Dragon and Excalibur won the PWG tag team titles from Chris Bosh and Quicksilver. They became the first team to successfully defend the titles, but later lost them to the X Foundation of Joey Ryan and Scott Lost. On November 13, 2004, at Free Admission (Just Kidding), Super Dragon beat Frankie Kazarian to win the PWG Championship. He defended the title against Homicide, Samoa Joe, Kevin Steen and others, before finally losing it to A.J. Styles on April 2, 2005, at All Star Weekend - Night Two.

On December 18, 2004, at Uncanny X-Mas after Dragon's match with Jonny Storm, a second Super Dragon came to the ring and attacked the real Super Dragon by delivering him some of his signature moves. This man attacked again on February 12, 2005, at All Nude Review, and on May 13, 2005, at Jason Takes PWG Excalibur turned on Dragon, revealed himself as the mastermind of the attacks and then defeated him in a Guerrilla Warfare match with help from Kevin Steen, who revealed himself as the second Super Dragon. This began a feud between Steen and Dragon. On June 11, 2005, at Guitarmageddon Super Dragon teamed up with his S.B.S. partner Disco Machine to take on the team of Kevin Steen and Excalibur. However, in the end Disco Machine also turned on Dragon and aligned himself with Steen and Excalibur as the new S.B.S. During his feud with the S.B.S. on October 1, 2005, Super Dragon was forced to team with Davey Richards to challenge for the tag team titles against El Generico and Human Tornado, known as the "2 Skinny Black Guys", at After School Special. Working well together as a team, Dragon and Richards managed to win the titles. On December 3, 2005, at Chanukah Chaos (The C's Are Silent), after Dragon had gotten a small measure of revenge on Excalibur and Disco Machine by defeating them in a tag team title match, he attacked the PWG Champion Kevin Steen during his title match with Joey Ryan and gave him two Psycho Drivers, causing him to lose the title. The feud ended on December 16, 2005, at Astonishing X-Mas in a Guerrilla Warfare match, in which Super Dragon came out victorious.

Super Dragon and Davey Richards continued their tag title reign defeating teams such as Cape Fear (El Generico and Quicksilver), Los Luchas (Zokre and Phoenix Star), The Kings of Wrestling (Chris Hero and Claudio Castagnoli), Roderick Strong and Jack Evans, and A.J. Styles and Christopher Daniels. During their reign, Dragon and Richards also turned the titles into World Tag Team Titles, by defending them in Germany and England. On May 20, 2006, however, Arrogance, the team of Scott Lost and Chris Bosh, defeated them for the titles at Enchantment Under The Sea.

Super Dragon returned to PWG on September 2 as a participant in the 2006 Battle of Los Angeles tournament. On the second night, he defeated Necro Butcher, and on the third, he defeated Frankie Kazarian and Jack Evans to advance to the finals, but was unable to compete due to injuries he sustained the previous night. Davey Richards would go on to win the tournament, but instead of wanting a World title shot, he wanted a rematch for the tag titles. The match was set to take place on October 6 at Self-Titled, but a conflict prevented Richards from being at the show. Instead of waiting for Richards to return, Super Dragon chose B-Boy as his partner and they went on to defeat Chris Bosh and Scott Lost for the championship. On November 17, 2006, Richards won the PWG World Tag Team Championship for a second time, teaming up with Roderick Strong to defeat the champions, B-Boy and Super Dragon. The next night, in the main event of the show, the duo lost the belts back to the men they had won them from in a 4-way match which also included the Kings of Wrestling, as well as the team of Alex Shelley and Chris Sabin. Dragon won the match for his team by pinning Richards after a Psycho Driver. Less than a month later on December 2, 2006, at Passive Hostility Dragon and B-Boy lost the tag team titles to Cape Fear, and split afterwards as a tag team.

Since then, Dragon suffered defeats at the hands of newcomer Ronin in a singles match, and a pinfall by Los Luchas in a tag team match. Soon after that Dragon broke his ankle and eventually made his return on April 8, 2007, at All Star Weekend V - Night Two during a match between Arrogance and Roderick Strong and Jack Evans when he and Davey Richards came out and attacked everyone and announced that Super Dragon would be Richards' partner for the upcoming Dynamite Duumvirate Tag Team Title Tournament. On May 20, 2007, however, the first night of the tournament, the reuniting Super Dragon and Davey Richards lost in the first round to the makeshift team of Roderick Strong and PAC, who would go on to win the whole tournament.

On October 27, 2007, Night 2 of PWG's European Vacation II Dragon and Davey Richards were able to defeat Kevin Steen and El Generico for the PWG World Tag Team Championships giving Richards his third and Dragon his fifth reign, with this being their second reign as a team. On the first weekend of January 2008 PWG held its sixth All Star Weekend, during which Dragon was scheduled to take on Susumu Yokosuka on the first night and TARO on the second night in a special "Return Grudge Match". Dragon, who had gained massive amounts of weight, took himself out of the Yokosuka match and replaced himself with CIMA and the next night defeated TARO in a lackluster match. On January 27, 2008, at Pearl Habra Dragon and Richards were stripped of their tag team titles after Richards no-showed the event.

After taking two months off Super Dragon returned to PWG on March 21, 2008, at 1.21 Gigawatts by attacking Jade Chung and giving her a Psycho Driver during a tag team match between the Dynasty (Joey Ryan and Scott Lost) and Kevin Steen and El Generico. On April 5, 2008, at It's a Gift...and a Curse Super Dragon continued his feud with the Dynasty by first attacking Scott Lost after his match with Claudio Castagnoli and then by brawling with Joey Ryan all over the building culminating in him giving Ryan a Psycho Driver off the stage through a table.

On May 17, 2008, Dragon and Richards teamed up once more for the 2008 Dynamite Duumvirate Tag Team Title Tournament, where they were defeated by the team of Kevin Steen and El Generico in the first round in a tag team title match. During the match, Dragon received yet another concussion, which led to him taking a hiatus from in-ring competition, still maintaining his backstage role with the company.

Super Dragon made his return on October 22, 2011, by saving former rival Kevin Steen from The Young Bucks after the two had cost him the PWG World Championship and challenged him to a handicap Guerrilla Warfare match. Steen then named Dragon his partner for the match on December 10. On December 10, Dragon and Steen, known collectively as "Appetite for Destruction", defeated The Young Bucks in a Guerrilla Warfare match to win the PWG World Tag Team Championship, Dragon's record-breaking sixth reign with the title. After being sidelined in early 2012 with a heel fracture, Dragon and Steen vacated the PWG World Tag Team Championship on May 25.

On June 26, 2015, Super Dragon made a surprise return to PWG, turning heel and forming a new version of the Mount Rushmore stable with PWG World Champion Roderick Strong and PWG World Tag Team Champions The Young Bucks. Dragon wrestled his first match in three and a half years on August 29, when he and The Young Bucks defeated Andrew Everett, Biff Busick and Trevor Lee in a Guerrilla Warfare main event.

=== Ring of Honor (2004, 2006) ===
The first time Super Dragon appeared in Ring of Honor (ROH) was at Do or Die II on March 13, 2004, when he defeated Excalibur in a try-out match. He would reappear two years later in 2006 as a part of CZW, during the ROH/CZW feud. Dragon made his return to the company on March 11, 2006, at Arena Warfare by attacking B. J. Whitmer during his match with Necro Butcher. The show ended with the CZW wrestlers taking over the ring and attacking Whitmer and other ROH wrestlers. On April 22, 2006, at The 100th Show, Dragon was a part of Team CZW along with Chris Hero and Necro Butcher as they defeated Team ROH of Samoa Joe, Whitmer, and Adam Pearce, when Claudio Castagnoli turned on his ROH teammates. This match saw Dragon hit a Psycho Driver on Whitmer from the apron to the floor through a table. On April 29, 2006, at Weekend of Champions: Night Two Whitmer gained revenge on Dragon and defeated him after giving him an exploder superplex through a table on the floor, to win their feud. After the match Adam Pearce and Ace Steel carried Dragon out of the arena and he has not returned to the company since.

== Championships and accomplishments ==
- All Pro Wrestling
  - APW Worldwide Internet Championship (2 times)
- Combat Zone Wrestling
  - CZW World Heavyweight Championship (1 time)
- Jersey Championship Wrestling
  - Jersey J-Cup (2004)
- Pro Wrestling Guerrilla
  - PWG Championship (1 time)
  - PWG World Tag Team Championship (6 times) – B-Boy (2), Excalibur (1), Davey Richards (2) and Kevin Steen (1)
- Pro Wrestling Illustrated
  - PWI ranked him #213 of the top 500 wrestlers in the PWI 500 in 2006
- Revolution Pro Wrestling
  - Rev-Pro Mexican Lucha Libre Heavyweight Championship (1 time)
  - Rev-Pro Junior Heavyweight Championship (2 times)
  - Rev-Pro Pride of the Mask Championship (2 times)
  - Revolution J Tournament (2001)
  - Match of the Year (2000) vs. Ultra Taro Jr., July 7
- SoCal Uncensored
  - Southern California Pro-Wrestling Hall of Fame (Class of 2010)
  - SoCal Wrestler of the Year (2001, 2003, 2004)
  - Match of the Year (2001) vs. B-Boy, November 3, Midwest Pro Wrestling
  - Match of the Year (2002) vs. Bobby Quance, December 14, Goldenstate Championship Wrestling
  - Match of the Year (2003) with B-Boy vs. Jardi Frantz and Bobby Quance, March 29, Goldenstate Championship Wrestling
  - Match of the Year (2004) vs. Joey Ryan, October 23, Pro Wrestling Guerrilla
  - Match of the Year (2006) with Davey Richards vs. Roderick Strong and Jack Evans, March 4, Pro Wrestling Guerrilla
  - Match of the Year (2011) with Kevin Steen vs. The Young Bucks, December 10, Pro Wrestling Guerrilla
- Westside Xtreme Wrestling
  - Cruiserweight Tournament (2005)

=== Luchas de Apuestas record ===
Winner (wager)	Loser (wager)	Location	Event	Date	Notes
Jardi Frantz (hair)	Super Dragon (mask)	Calistoga, California	APW Live event	July 6, 2002	(Note: Dragon lost the match, when Samoa Joe threw in the towel, but afterwards it was announced that the wager could only be lost via pinfall or submission.)
Super Dragon (mask)	Shogun (mask)	Industry, California	RPW Pride of the Mask II	October 23, 2002	
Super Dragon (mask)	Super Dragon #2 (Note: Jardi Frantz) (mask)	Hayward, California	APW Live event	December 6, 2002	
Super Dragon (mask)	TARO (mask)	Industry, California	RPW Four Year Anniversary Extravaganza	November 29, 2003	
