= Scott Lost =

American professional wrestler (born 1980)

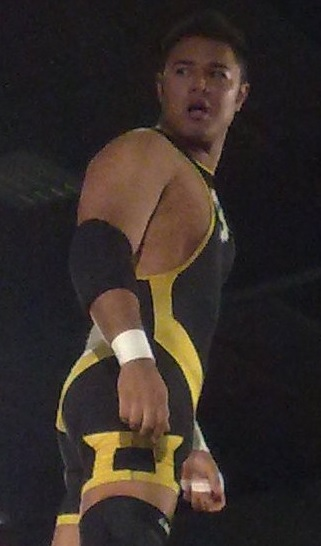
- Lost in 2008

Personal information
- Born: Scott Epperson; June 8, 1980 (age 46) Santa Cruz, California, U.S.

Professional wrestling career
- Ring name: Scott Lost
- Billed height: 5 ft 8 in (173 cm)
- Billed weight: 185 lb (84 kg)
- Trained by: Mike Bell; Tom Howard; Samoa Joe
- Debut: 2000
- Retired: 2010

Scott Epperson (born June 8, 1980), better known by the ring name Scott Lost, is an American retired professional wrestler. He is best known for his work with Pro Wrestling Guerrilla, which he founded with five other wrestlers and where he is a former five-time PWG World Tag Team Champion.

== Career ==
In May 2003 Scott Lost, Disco Machine, Excalibur, Joey Ryan, Super Dragon and Top Gun Talwar, known collectively as the "PWG Six", founded SoCal promotion Pro Wrestling Guerrilla. Lost began his PWG career as part of the X-Foundation with Funky Billy Kim and "The Technical Wizard" Joey Ryan. They wrestled together on PWG's first show on July 26, 2003, losing to the team of Adam Pearce, Hardkore Kidd, and Al Katrazz. Lost then wrestled in the Badass Mother 3000 tournament but was defeated in the first round by the eventual winner of the tournament Frankie Kazarian. Lost teamed with Ryan in the Tango & Cash Invitational tournament, but was once again unsuccessful in winning gold as they were defeated in the semifinals by Super Dragon and American Dragon. They did however win the PWG Tag Team Championship at the next show by defeating inaugural champions Homicide and B-Boy, but could only hold them until the following month, before losing to Chris Bosh and Quicksilver. Three months later, they regained the championship from Super Dragon and Excalibur. This reign did not go well either, as the X-Foundation began losing many matches. Lost blamed Ryan for this, and the two had a ladder match to determine which one would hold the tag team championship. Lost won the match and chose Chris Bosh as his partner. The team called themselves Arrogance. They had a dominant reign, and became the longest reigning champions in PWG history, a record broken by The Young Bucks in 2009. During their reign Lost also rejoined with his former partner Joey Ryan. Scott Lost, along with Chris Bosh, would help Joey Ryan win a number of his matches, especially once Ryan won the PWG Championship. Arrogance lost the titles to Quicksilver and Scorpio Sky in a titles vs. masks match. Although Lost did not win, he attacked Scorpio Sky after the match and unmasked him, starting a feud that ended in a violent I Quit match at Chanuka Chaos (The C's Are Silent), where Sky was able to force Lost to quit.

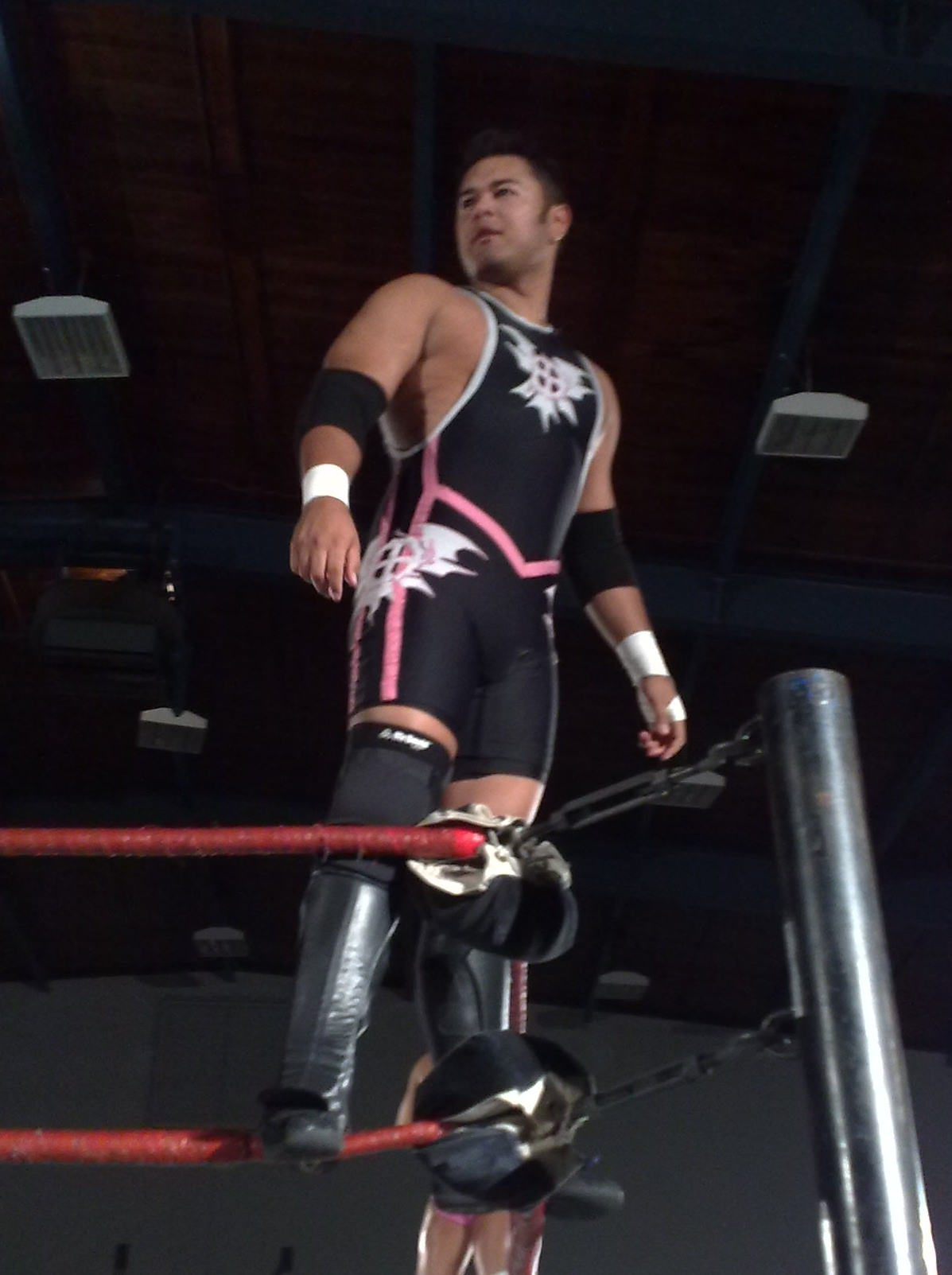
Lost posing on the turnbuckles before a match

In early 2006 Scott Lost began once again going after the tag team championship with Bosh. They faced champions Super Dragon and Davey Richards on February 19, 2006, at European Vacation - England, but were unable to regain the titles. In a rematch at Enchantment Under the Sea on May 20, 2006, with help from Joey Ryan and Scorpio Sky, lost and Bosh regained the titles. The four men formed a stable called The Dynasty. They held the titles until October 6 when they lost them to Super Dragon and B-Boy.

2008 started off with Lost and Joey Ryan being awarded the PWG World Tag Team Championship on January 27 after the previous champions Super Dragon and Davey Richards failed to defend the titles against them on three occasions. In their first defense that same night Lost and Ryan defeated the Young Bucks. On March 21, 2008, lost and Ryan lost the PWG World Tag Team Titles to Kevin Steen and El Generico. During the rest of 2008 he would also defeat TJ Perkins to become the AWS Lightweight Champion and in August defeat Scorpio Sky to become the AWS Heavyweight Champion. Since then Scott Lost has held both titles and often defended both of them on the same card. Prior to the 2009 Battle of Los Angeles Lost went on a winning streak and defeated El Generico, Colt Cabana, Human Tornado and Joey Ryan in singles matches, only to lose to eventual winner Kenny Omega in the quarter-finals of the actual tournament for the vacant PWG World Championship.

On Friday, January 29, 2010, Scott Lost competed for the wrestling promotion Ring of Honor, when they made their debut in Los Angeles, California, as part of the WrestleReunion 4 convention. He teamed up with Scorpio Sky in a losing effort against Colt Cabana and El Generico. On the following night's PWG show, lost and Joey Ryan were defeated by Japanese wrestling legend The Great Muta and Japanese up and comer KAI in a tag team match.

On June 28, 2010, PWG announced that Lost would be wrestling his retirement match on July 30 at the company's seventh anniversary show, where he will face longtime rival Scorpio Sky. On July 30 Lost was defeated by Sky in his retirement match. With his professional wrestling career over, Epperson announced his intentions of becoming a full-time comic book artist.

== Championships and accomplishments ==
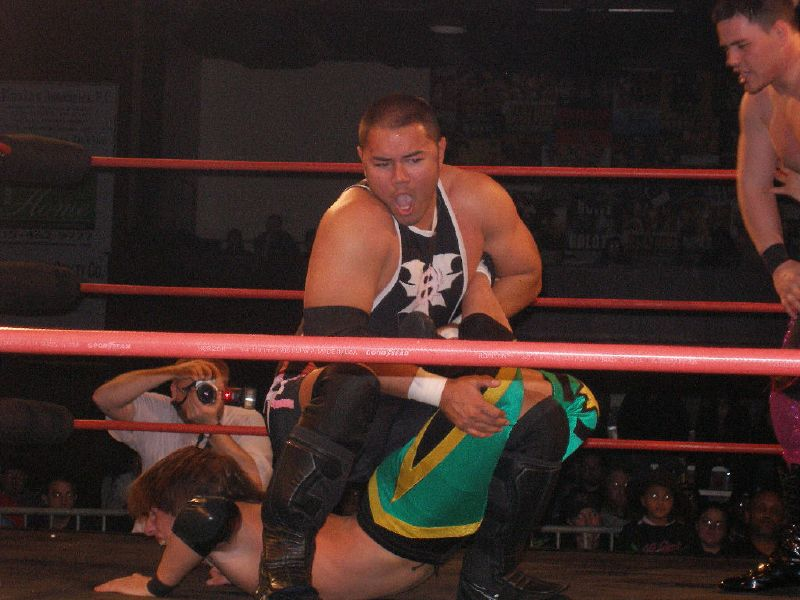
Lost applying a sharpshooter

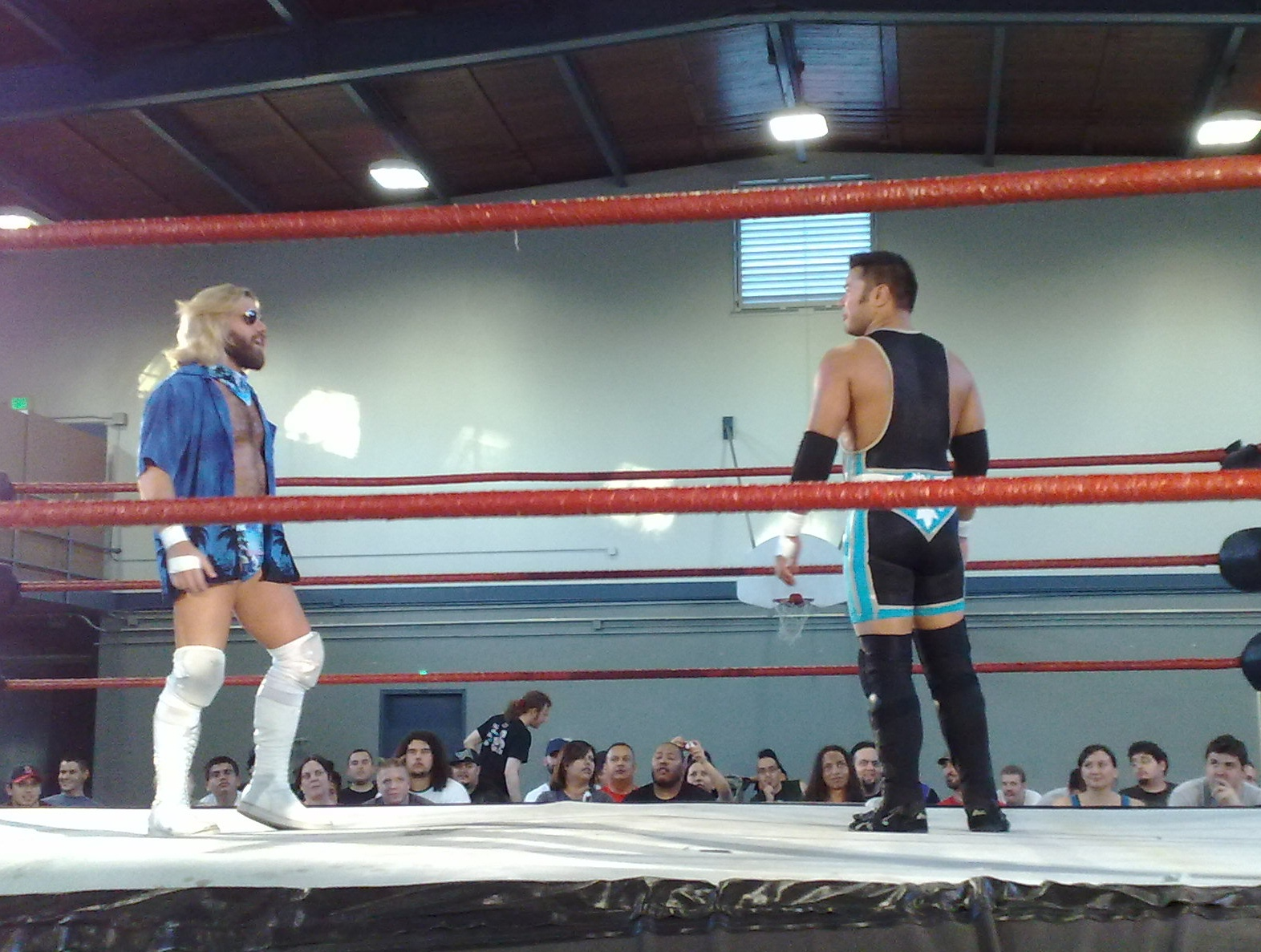
Lost (right) with regular tag team partner Joey Ryan in 2008.

- Alternative Wrestling Show
  - AWS Heavyweight Championship (1 time)
  - AWS Lightweight Championship (1 time)
  - AWS Tag Team Championship (2 times) – with Joey Ryan
- Battle Ground Pro Wrestling
  - BGPW Heavyweight Championship (1 time)
- California Wrestling Alliance
  - CWA Tag Team Championship (1 time) – with Joey Ryan
- Golden State Championship Wrestling
  - GSCW Light Heavyweight Championship (2 times)
- Pacific Coast Wrestling
  - PCW Tag Team Championship (1 time) – with Joey Ryan
- Pro Wrestling Guerrilla
  - PWG World Tag Team Championship (5 times) – with Joey Ryan (3) and Chris Bosh (2)
- Pro Wrestling Illustrated
  - PWI ranked him #222 of the 500 best singles wrestlers of the year in the PWI 500 in 2009
- SoCal Uncensored
  - Match of the Year (2005) with Chris Bosh vs. Quicksilver and Scorpio Sky, July 9, 2005, The 2nd Annual PWG Bicentennial Birthday Extravaganza - Night One
  - Most Outstanding Wrestler (2008, 2009)
  - Tag Team of the Year (2002) with Joey Ryan
  - Tag Team of the Year (2005) with Chris Bosh
  - Wrestler of the Year (2008)
- World Class Wrestling Alliance
  - WCWA Tag Team Championship (1 time) – with Joey Ryan
- World Pro Wrestling
  - WPW Cruiserweight Championship (1 time)
  - WPW Tag Team Championship (1 time) – with Joey Ryan

=== Luchas de Apuestas record ===
Winner (wager)	Loser (wager)	Location	Event	Date	Notes
Quicksilver and Scorpio Sky (masks)	Scott Lost and Chris Bosh (Championship)	Los Angeles, California	PWG Live event	July 9, 2005	
