= Pro Wrestling Guerrilla tournaments =

Pro Wrestling Guerrilla has held a variety of professional wrestling tournaments competed for by wrestlers that are a part of their roster.

== Sporadic tournaments ==
=== Bad Ass Mother 3000 ===
The Bad Ass Mother 3000 was a tournament held on August 29 and 30, 2003, in Eagle Rock, California and City of Industry, California. The winner of the tournament would become the inaugural PWG Champion.

First round
Super Dragon	Pin
Hook Bomberry	19:32
Colt Cabana	Pin
Matt Cross	11:37
Joey Ryan	Pin
Scorpio Sky	14:04
Adam Pearce	Pin
Disco Machine	8:07
Frankie Kazarian	Pin
Scott Lost	11:05
B-Boy	Pin
Tony Kozina	16:52
Nosawa	Pin
Taro	8:53
Christopher Daniels	Pin
Hardkore Kidd	12:10

Second round
Super Dragon	Pin
Colt Cabana	13:14
Joey Ryan	Pin
Adam Pearce	12:31
Frankie Kazarian	Sub
Lil' Cholo*	5:39
Nosawa	Pin
Christopher Daniels	6:54

Semifinals
Super Dragon	Pin
Joey Ryan	22:08
Frankie Kazarian	Pin
Christopher Daniels	13:49

Finals
Joey Ryan	Pin
Frankie Kazarian	11:38

- * B-Boy suffered an injury and was replaced by Lil' Cholo.

=== Tango & Cash Invitational ===
The Tango & Cash Invitational was a tag team tournament held on January 24 and 25, 2004, in Santa Ana, California. The winners of the tournament would be crowned the first ever PWG Tag Team Champions.

- Participants:

- Apollo Kahn and Sara Del Rey
- Babi Slymm and Matt Cross
- The Ballard Brothers (Shane Ballard and Shannon Ballard)
- Chris Bosh and Quicksilver
- Christopher Daniels and The Messiah
- Disco Machine and Rising Son
- Double Dragon (American Dragon and Super Dragon)
- Excalibur and Jonny Storm
- The Gold Bond Mafia (Chris Hero and CM Punk)
- Hardkore Inc. (Al Katrazz and Hardkore Kidd)
- Havana Pitbulls (Ricky Reyes and Rocky Romero)
- The Iron Saints (Sal Thomaselli and Vito Thomaselli)
- Los Luchas (Phoenix Star and Zokre)
- Strong Style Thugz/Team Friday (B-Boy and Homicide)
- Puma and Samoa Joe
- X Foundation (Joey Ryan and Scott Lost)

First round
Bosh/Quicksilver	Pin
Los Luchas	11:46
X Foundation	Pin
Slymm/Cross	14:28
Havana Pitbulls	Pin
Hardkore Inc.	8:12
American Dragon / Super Dragon	Pin
Excalibur/Storm	20:39
Puma/Joe	Pin
Ballard Brothers	6:51
B-Boy/Homicide	Pin
Disco Machine/Rising Son	12:53
The Iron Saints	Pin
Khan/Del Rey	13:02
Hero/Punk	Pin
Daniels/Messiah	15:43

Second round
Bosh/Quicksilver	Pin
X Foundation	11:35
Havana Pitbulls	Pin
American Dragon / Super Dragon	12:04
Puma/Joe	Pin
B-Boy/Homicide	17:44
Iron Saints	Pin
Hero/Punk	22:34

Semifinals
X Foundation	Sub
American Dragon / Super Dragon	22:42
B-Boy/Homicide	Sub
Hero/Punk	17:35

Finals
American Dragon / Super Dragon	Pin
B-Boy/Homicide	22:42

=== PWG World Championship #1 Contender's Tournament ===
The eight-man tournament to determine the #1 contender for Joey Ryan's PWG World Championship was held on both nights of the All Star Weekend 3 on April 8, 2006 and April 9, 2006.

Quarterfinals (All Star Weekend 3 – Night One) (April 8)
B-Boy	Win
Excalibur	13:21
Kevin Steen	Win
Matt Sydal	19:57
Chris Sabin	Win
Scorpio Sky	22:34
Frankie Kazarian	Win
Jimmy Yang	12:14

Finalists
B-Boy
Kevin Steen
Chris Sabin
Frankie Kazarian

Final (Four-Way) (All Star Weekend 3 – Night Two) (April 9)
B-Boy Kevin Steen	Win
Chris Sabin Frankie Kazarian	13:44

=== ¡Dia de los Dangerous! ===
¡Dia de los Dangerous! PWG World Championship Tournament was a one night tournament held on February 24, 2008, in Reseda, California to crown the new PWG World Champion, after the former Champion Low Ki was forced to vacate the title due to an injury. Roderick Strong who was booked to challenge Low Ki at the event was given an automatic spot in the finals of the tournament.

Semifinals
Karl Anderson	Pin
Frankie Kazarian	12:05
Human Tornado*	Pin
Necro Butcher*	14:56

Finals
Karl Anderson†	Pin
Human Tornado Roderick Strong†	10:00

- * This was a No Disqualification match
- † This was a three-way dance

== Battle of Los Angeles ==
=== Dates and venues of finals ===
{{#section-a:Battle of Los Angeles (professional wrestling)|Winners, dates, venues and main events}}

== See also ==
- Professional wrestling tournament
