= Quicksilver (wrestler) =

American professional wrestler

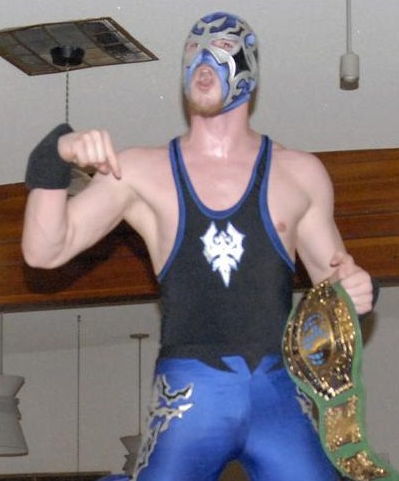
- Quicksilver as one-half of the PWG World Tag Team Champions in June 2005.

Personal information
- Born: Rick John Clements; 1983 (age 42–43) San Diego, California, United States

Professional wrestling career
- Ring name(s): El Hombre Blanco Enmascarado; Quicksilver
- Billed height: 5 ft 11 in (180 cm)
- Billed weight: 174 lb (79 kg)
- Trained by: American Wild Child; Mr. Excitement; Ron Rivera
- Debut: 2002
- Retired: 2007

Rick John Clements is an American screen and television writer, voice actor, and retired Professional Wrestler.

In wrestling, he performed under the ring name Quicksilver, and he was part of the independent circuit, working for promotions such as Pro Wrestling Guerrilla (PWG) and SoCal Uncensored. He also worked for East Coast promotions such as Jersey All Pro Wrestling (JAPW) and Combat Zone Wrestling (CZW). He is also known for appearances on MTV's Wrestling Society X under the ring name El Hombre Blanco Enmascarado. After retiring from wrestling, Clements went into the film and television industry, and has provided the voice of Frank Nougat from podcast series Murder Mysteries with Frank Nougat.

== Professional wrestling career ==
=== Early career (2002–2005) ===
Beginning his career in Revolution Pro, Quicksilver was a graduate of its Rudos Dojo wrestling school along with Chris Bosh, Scorpio Sky, and many others. After debuting in the Fight For The Revolution Tournament, in which the winner would receive a contract with the company, Quicksilver would advance all the way to the finals against Sky ending in a time limit draw. Both men were given contracts.

Quicksilver and Sky would then form the Aerial Xpress (or AXP for short). They had great success, quickly running through all the top tag teams and becoming Southern California Tag Team of the Year in both 2003 and 2004. The Aerial Xpress won the AWS Tag Team Championship twice. In late 2004, Quicksilver would win the final of the Spirit of the Revolution Tournament, defeating Phoenix Star. He would then go on to compete in the 2004 Revolution J tournament losing to Sky in the finals. Soon after, he defeated Sky to become the Revolution Pro Junior Heavyweight Champion on the final Rev Pro show.

In 2005, he would also hold the AWS Light Heavyweight Championship at the same time and would lose and regain the Revolution Pro Junior Championship, becoming the last man to ever hold the title.

=== Pro Wrestling Guerrilla (2004–2007) ===
After arriving in Pro Wrestling Guerrilla, Quicksilver and tag team partner Scorpio Sky, known as the Aerial Xpress, were successful but when Scorpio Sky was sidelined due to injury, Quicksilver found himself teaming up with Chris Bosh, Quicksilver won the PWG World Tag Team Championship with Bosh, but lost them soon after.

Quicksilver then teamed back up with Sky, with Dino Winwood as their manager, becoming involved in the tag team title chase in 2004 and 2005. They received shots at then champions Arrogance (Scott Lost and Chris Bosh) but were unsuccessful. In the summer of 2005, they defeated Los Luchas (Zokre and Phoenix Star) to become #1 Contenders and once again were given a shot at the belts in a Masks vs. Titles match, If the Aerial Xpress lost, they would be forced to remove their masks. This time they were victorious.

The Aerial Xpress had finally won the PWG World Tag Team Championship, but their victory came at a price. During the match, Quicksilver was injured on a dive to the outside of the ring. Because of this, Sky had to wrestle most of the match alone. Despite the fact that the Aerial Xpress won, Arrogance and Joey Ryan still unmasked Sky. After this event, Sky disappeared from PWG for several months, which forced the AXP to relinquish the tag team titles. With Sky gone, Quicksilver changed his focus to singles competition; more specifically, the PWG World Championship. In August 2005, he faced Kevin Steen for the championship but was unsuccessful. In September, Quicksilver competed in the first Battle of Los Angeles tournament, defeating Davey Richards and Rocky Romero, before being defeated by Bosh, who went on to win the tournament.

In 2006, Quicksilver teamed with fellow masked wrestler El Generico to form Cape Fear. In January, they received a tag team title shot, facing Richards and Super Dragon in the main event of Crusin' for a Brusin'. The team came very close to winning the match, but could not capture the belts on this occasion. Cape Fear received a rematch in February, once again main eventing, this time at the European Vacation - Germany event. Once again, they were defeated. After receiving two title shots in the span of two months, Cape Fear had to work their way back into title contention. Over the next few months, they would face Arrogance (twice) and Los Luchas, before getting another shot at Richards and Dragon at All Star Weekend 3 - Night 2 in April, but they were defeated for a third time. Cape Fear would continue to team together facing teams such as the Briscoe Brothers, Alex Koslov and Ronin, Chris Sabin and Kevin Steen, the Kings of Wrestling (Chris Hero and Claudio Castagnoli), and the Motor City Machine Guns (Alex Shelley and Chris Sabin). In September, Quicksilver once again competed in the Battle of Los Angeles, but was eliminated in the first round by Dragon Kid. In November, Quicksilver would face Ryan in a PWG World Championship match, but would lose. He would end the year on a high note, finally winning the tag team titles when he and Generico defeated Dragon and B-Boy at Passive Hostility in December.

After three title defenses, Cape Fear's title reign came to an end. On February 10, 2007, Quicksilver suffered a class two concussion during a match against Richards and Roderick Strong at Guitarmageddon II: Armoryageddon. On March 10, at Album of the Year, the titles would be vacated. The match against Richards and Strong proved to be his last in wrestling, as he revealed in a podcast interview, he had retired due to contracting MRSA, a form of a staph infection. He said the infection became so bad, he nearly died and took it as a sign to move on.

=== Wrestling Society X (2006) ===
In 2006, Quicksilver arrived in Wrestling Society X as "El Hombre Blanco Enmascarado". His debut on WSX against Jack Evans ended in defeat. He was a mainstay on WSXtra, where he formed a tag team with old school wrestler Matt Classic.

== Championships and accomplishments ==
- Alternative Wrestling Show
  - AWS Light Heavyweight Championship (1 time)
  - AWS Tag Team Championship (2 times) – with Scorpio Sky
- Pro Wrestling Guerrilla
  - PWG World Tag Team Championship (3 times) – with Scorpio Sky (1), Chris Bosh (1) and El Generico (1)
- Pro Wrestling Illustrated
  - PWI ranked him #373 of the 500 best singles wrestlers of the PWI Years in 2006
- Revolution Pro Wrestling
  - Revolution Pro Junior Heavyweight Championship (2 times)
  - Spirit of The Revolution Tournament (2004)
- SoCal Uncensored
  - Match of the Year (2005) with Scorpio Sky vs. Chris Bosh and Scott Lost, July 9, 2005, The 2nd Annual PWG Bicentennial Birthday Extravaganza - Night One
  - Rookie of the Year (2003)
  - Tag Team of the Year (2003, 2004) with Scorpio Sky
  - Tag Team of the Year (2006) with El Generico

=== Luchas de Apuestas record ===
Winner (wager)	Loser (wager)	Location	Event	Date	Notes
Quicksilver and Scorpio Sky (masks)	Chris Bosh and Scott Lost (Championship)	Los Angeles, California, United States	2nd Annual PWG Bicentennial Birthday Extravaganza - Night One	July 9, 2005	
