= PWG World Tag Team Championship =

Professional wrestling tag team championship

Details
- Promotion: Pro Wrestling Guerrilla
- Date established: January 25, 2004
- Date retired: November 11, 2023

Other names
- PWG Tag Team Championship (2004–2006); PWG World Tag Team Championship (2006–2023)
Statistics
- First champions: B-Boy and Homicide
- Most reigns: (as a team); The Young Bucks (Matt Jackson and Nick Jackson) (4 reigns) (as an individual); Super Dragon (6 reigns)
- Longest reign: The Rascalz (Zachary Wentz and Dezmond Xavier) (3093 days)
- Shortest reign: Beaver Boys (Alex Reynolds and John Silver), Monster Mafia (Ethan Page and Josh Alexander) and Unbreakable F'n Machines (Brian Cage and Michael Elgin) (<1 day)
- Oldest champion: Super Dragon (36 years, 201 days)
- Youngest champion: Pac (20 years, 271 days)
- Heaviest champion: Brody King (285 lb (129 kg))
- Lightest champion: Candice LeRae (110 lb (50 kg))

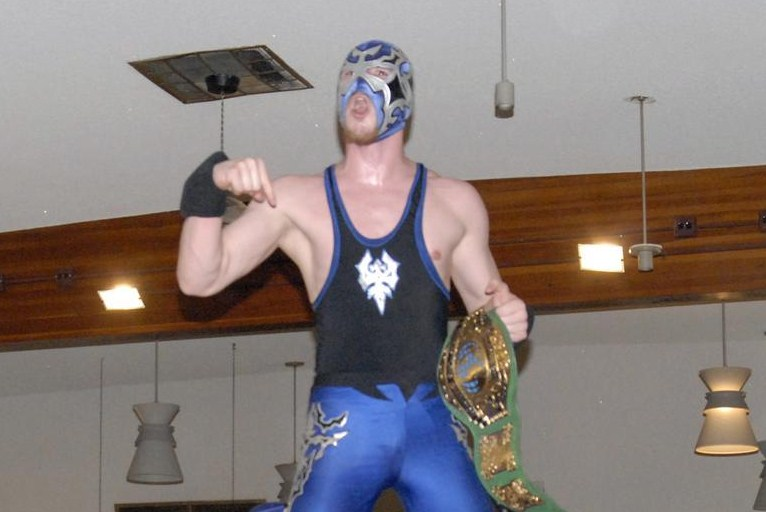
Professional wrestler Quicksilver as one-half of the PWG World Tag Team Champions on June 13, 2005

The PWG World Tag Team Championship was a professional wrestling world tag team championship contested for in the tag team division of the Pro Wrestling Guerrilla (PWG) promotion. It was created and debuted on January 25, 2004, at PWG's Tango & Cash Invitational – Night Two event, where B-Boy and Homicide were crowned the inaugural champions.

Being a professional wrestling championship, title reigns are not won legitimately; they are instead won via a scripted ending to a match or awarded to a wrestler because of a storyline. The title has been referred to as the PWG Tag Team Championship and as the PWG World Tag Team Championship since 2004. There have been a total of 36 reigns among 38 wrestlers and 27 teams.

== History ==
On January 25, 2004, PWG debuted their version of a tag team championship, which they named the PWG Tag Team Championship. B-Boy and Homicide won a two night tournament named the Tango & Cash Invitational to become the first champions at Tango & Cash Invitational – Night Two. The championship was defended for the first time outside the United States on February 18, 2006, when then-champions, Davey Richards and Super Dragon, defeated Cape Fear (El Generico and Quicksilver) in Essen, Germany at PWG's European Vacation – Germany event. After this event and one held on February 19, 2006 in Orpington, England where the championship was defended once again, PWG renamed the championship to the PWG World Tag Team Championship. The championship later changed hands for the first time outside the United States on October 27, 2007, at PWG's European Vacation II – England event, where then-champions Kevin Steen and El Generico were defeated by Davey Richards and Super Dragon in Portsmouth, England. On July 27, 2014, Candice LeRae became the first female wrestler to hold the title, when she and Joey Ryan defeated The Young Bucks (Matt and Nick Jackson) to become the new champions. On June 16, 2017, Penta el Zero M and Rey Fenix successfully defended the title in Ciudad Nezahualcóyotl, Mexico.

== Reigns ==
The inaugural champions were B-Boy and Homicide, who won the championship by defeating the team of The American Dragon and Super Dragon in the finals of the Tango & Cash Invitational Tag Team Tournament on January 25, 2004, at PWG's Tango & Cash Invitational – Night Two event. At 801 days and counting, The Rascalz (Zachary Wentz and Dezmond Xavier) are the longest reigning tag team champions in their first reign. The Unbreakable F'n Machines' (Brian Cage and Michael Elgin) only reign, Monster Mafia's (Ethan Page and Josh Alexander) only reign and the Beaver Boys' (Alex Reynolds and John Silver) only reign share the record for the shortest in the title's history at less than one day. PWG publishes a list of successful championship defenses (victories against challengers for the championship) for each champion on their official website, unlike most other professional wrestling promotions, for unknown reasons. As of October 2026, The Young Bucks have the most defenses, with 15; Twelve teams are tied for having the least, with 0. Those teams and reigns are B-Boy's and Homicide's only reign, The X–Foundation/The Dynasty (Joey Ryan and Scott Lost)'s first and second reigns, Chris Bosh's and Quicksilver's only reign, The Aerial Xpress (Quicksilver and Scorpio Sky)'s only reign, Davey Richards and Roderick Strong's only reign, B-Boy and Super Dragon's second reign, Jack Evans and Roderick Strong's only reign, The Age of the Fall (Jimmy Jacobs and Tyler Black)'s only reign, the Unbreakable F'n Machines' (Brian Cage and Michael Elgin) only reign, Monster Mafia's (Ethan Page and Josh Alexander) only reign, the Beaver Boys' (Alex Reynolds and John Silver) only reign and Andrew Everett and Trevor Lee's only reign. The Young Bucks (Matt Jackson and Nick Jackson) hold the record for most reigns, with four.

== Notes ==
1. – Though the event "Eleven" started on July 26, 2014, the title change took place after midnight on July 27.
