= Disco Machine =

American former professional wrestler

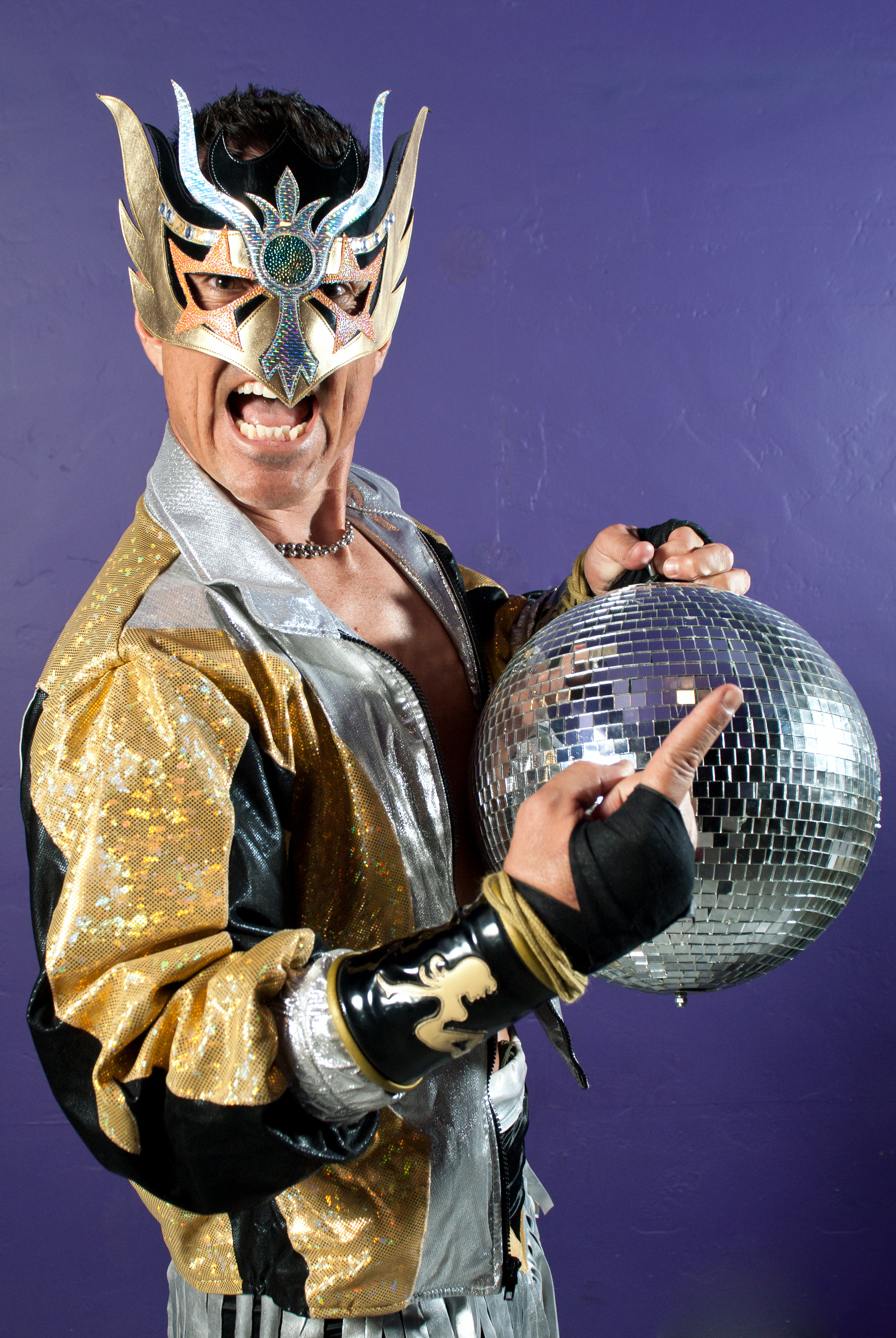
- Disco Machine in 2010

Personal information
- Born: Michael Mondragon; January 1, 1970 (age 56) New York City, New York

Professional wrestling career
- Ring name: Disco Machine
- Billed height: 5 ft 9 in (1.75 m)
- Billed weight: 190 lb (86 kg)
- Billed from: "Behind the velvet rope of Studio 54"
- Trained by: Super Dragon
- Debut: April 11, 1998
- Retired: 2012

Michael Mondragon is an American former professional wrestler best known under the ring name Disco Machine. He was one of the six founders of the Southern Californian independent promotion, Pro Wrestling Guerrilla.

== Professional wrestling career ==
Disco Machine kicked off his wrestling career working for Revolution Pro, a prominent SoCal promotion, in 1998. In 2003, he became one of the six owners of brand new SoCal promotion Pro Wrestling Guerrilla, collectively known as the "PWG Six". In 2005, he teamed with Excalibur, Kevin Steen, and Ronin as the new S.B.S., after he and Excalibur turned on Super Dragon. Disco and Excalibur also provide commentary on most of PWG's DVD releases (along with their occasional partner, TARO). He was featured in a multiple page article about Pro Wrestling Guerrilla in FHM magazine's March 2006 issue.

In 2007, Disco Machine appeared with Wrestling Society X, a short-lived promotion produced and broadcast by MTV, where he teamed with Joey "Magnum" Ryan as "That '70s Team".

Disco Machine retired from wrestling in 2012.

== Championships and accomplishments ==
- NTW Pro Wrestling
  - NTW Cruiserweight Championship (1 time)
- NWA Pro Wrestling
  - NWA Pro Los Angeles Light Heavyweight Championship (1 time)
- Revolution Pro Wrestling
  - Mexican Lucha Libre Championship (1 time)
  - Revolution Pro Junior Heavyweight Championship (1 time)
- Vendetta Pro Wrestling
  - Vendetta Pro Tri-Force Championship (1 time)
