= Dynamite Duumvirate Tag Team Title Tournament (2013) =

Professional wrestling tournament by PWG

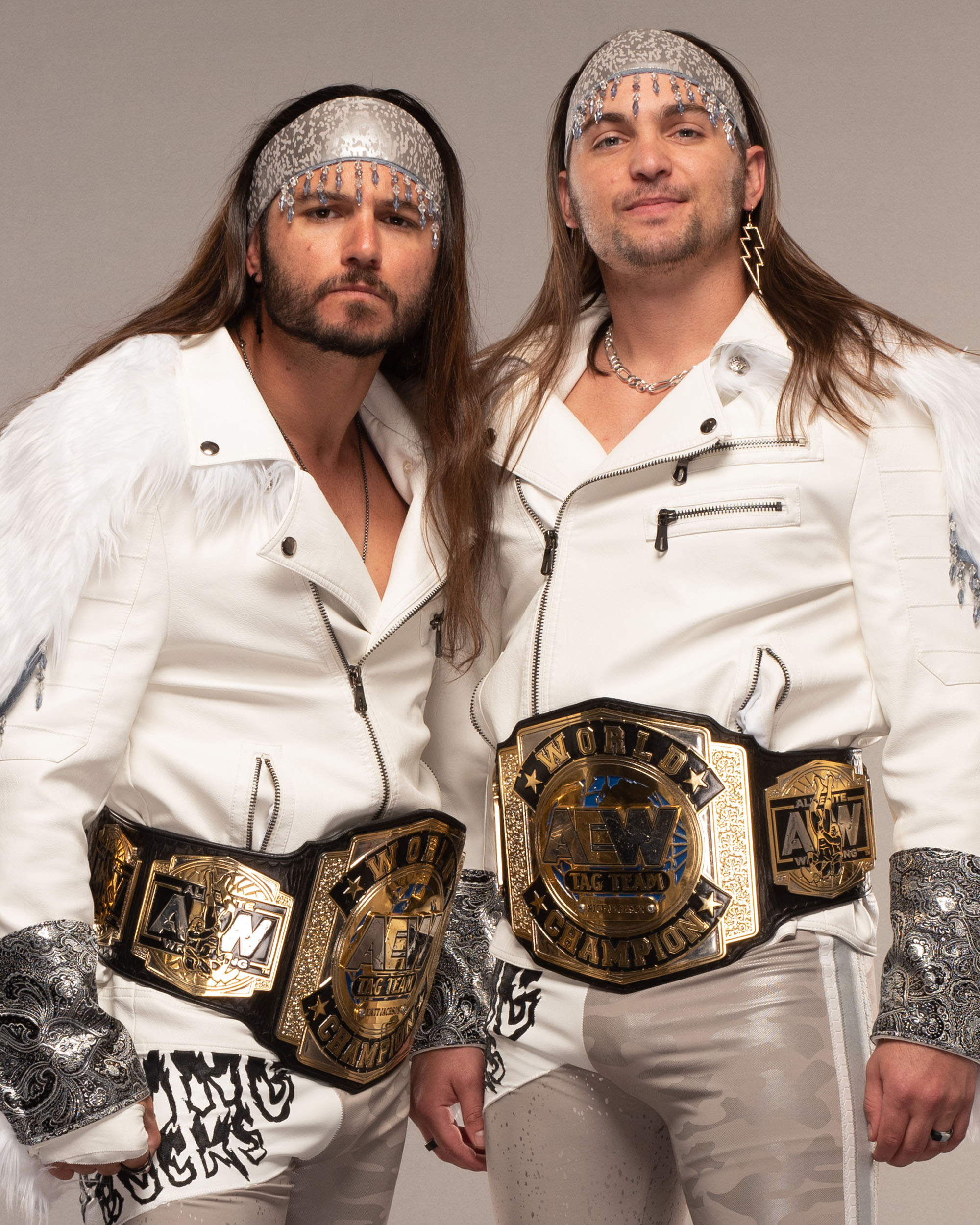
- The 2013 tournament winners The Young Bucks
- Promotion: Pro Wrestling Guerrilla
- Date: January 12, 2013
- City: Reseda, California
- Venue: American Legion Post #308

Event chronology
← Previous; Mystery Vortex I	Next → All Star Weekend 9

Dynamite Duumvirate Tag Team Title Tournament chronology
← Previous; 2012	Next → 2014

Dynamite Duumvirate Tag Team Title Tournament (2013) was the seventh Dynamite Duumvirate Tag Team Title Tournament (DDT4) produced by Pro Wrestling Guerrilla (PWG). The event took place on January 12, 2013 at the American Legion Post #308 in Reseda, California.

The PWG World Tag Team Championship was defended in the tournament. The title changed hands twice during the tournament. First, Unbreakable F'n Machines (Brian Cage and Michael Elgin) defeated the defending champions Super Smash Brothers (Player Uno and Stupefied) in the quarter-final round. And then, The Young Bucks defeated Unbreakable F'n Machines to win the titles in the semi-final round. Young Bucks would then win the 2013 tournament by defeating El Generico and Kevin Steen in the final, thus winning the tournament for the third time and reaching the DDT4 final for the fourth time. This was Generico's farewell match in PWG. Aside from the DDT4, two non-tournament matches took place in which Willie Mack defeated B-Boy and Drake Younger defeated Sami Callihan in a Knockout or Submission Only match, the second match in the Best of Three Series to determine the #1 contender for the PWG World Championship.

== Production ==
=== Background ===
On December 2, 2012, PWG announced on its official Twitter account that the 2013 edition of DDT4 would take place on January 12, 2013.

=== Storylines ===
==== Original line-up ====
The previous year's winners the Super Smash Brothers (Player Uno and Stupefied) entered the DDT4 as the reigning and defending World Tag Team Champions. Other teams announced for the tournament were:

- The Briscoe Brothers (Jay Briscoe and Mark Briscoe)
- DojoBros (Eddie Edwards and Roderick Strong)
- El Generico and Kevin Steen
- Future Shock (Adam Cole and Kyle O'Reilly)
- The Inner City Machine Guns (Rich Swann and Ricochet)
- Unbreakable F'n Machines (Brian Cage and Michael Elgin)
- The Young Bucks (Matt Jackson and Nick Jackson)

==== Replacement ====
While originally being announced for DDT4, El Generico was forced to pull out of the tournament due to injury. Willie Mack was named his replacement as Kevin Steen's partner, but this once again changed on January 9, when PWG announced that Generico, in the midst of reports that he had signed with WWE, would be teaming with Steen.

==== Non-tournament matches ====
At Mystery Vortex, Sami Callihan defeated Drake Younger in the first match of the Best of Three Series between the two to determine the #1 contender for the PWG World Championship. It was later announced that the second match of the series would take place at DDT4.

== Event ==
=== Quarterfinals ===
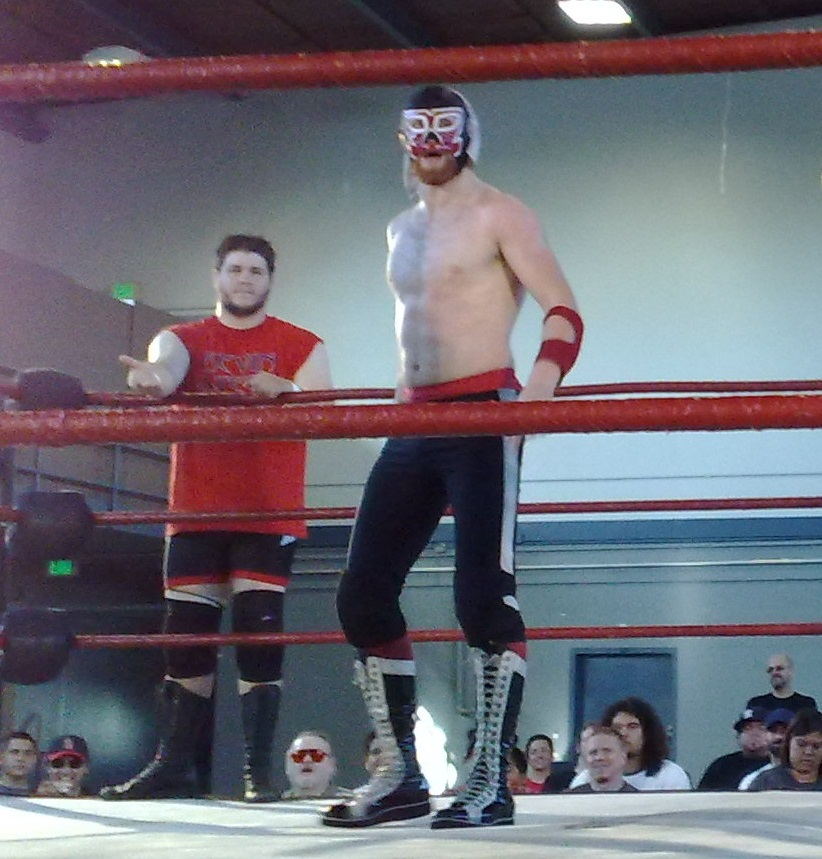
Kevin Steen and El Generico teamed together for the last time in PWG at DDT4.

The tournament kicked off with a match between The Inner City Machine Guns (Rich Swann and Ricochet) and The Young Bucks (Matt Jackson and Nick Jackson). Matt blocked a standing 450° splash by Swann with his knees and pinned him with a cradle for the win.

Next, Super Smash Brothers (Player Uno and Stupefied) defended the PWG World Tag Team Championship against Unbreakable F'N Machines (Brian Cage and Michael Elgin). Uno suffered a separated shoulder during the match which came into play when Super Smash Brothers tried to deliver a Fatality (Gory Bomb by Uno and diving somersault cutter by Stupefied combination) to Elgin, allowing Elgin to deliver an Elgin Bomb to Stupefied for the win. As a result, Unbreakable F'N Machines won the World Tag Team Championship.

Next, Dojo Bros (Eddie Edwards and Roderick Strong) took on Future Shock (Adam Cole and Kyle O'Reilly). Edwards and O'Reilly were knocked out of the ring after Edwards delivered a superplex to O'Reilly, allowing Cole to hit Strong with the PWG World Championship title belt and pin him for the win.

Next, El Generico and Kevin Steen took on The Briscoe Brothers (Jay Briscoe and Mark Briscoe). Generico and Steen had a miscommunication after Generico was about to accidentally hit a Yakuza Kick, which led to both of them shoving each other out and Steen getting knocked out of the ring. Briscoe Brothers capitalized and tried to hit an electric chair and springboard lariat combination on Generico but Generico countered by pinning Jay with a victory roll.

=== Semifinals ===
The semifinal of DDT4 began with Unbreakable F'N Machines defending the World Tag Team Championship against The Young Bucks. Michael Elgin tried to deliver an Elgin Bomb to Matt Jackson, but Nick Jackson rolled him up, allowing Matt to lay on top of Elgin and pin him for the win. As a result, Young Bucks won the World Tag Team Championship.

In the next semifinal, El Generico and Kevin Steen took on Future Shock. After knocking out Kyle O'Reilly with a half and half suplex and a cannonball, Generico and Steen delivered an Assembly Line (Package piledriver by Steen rolled into a spike brainbuster by Generico) to Adam Cole for the win.

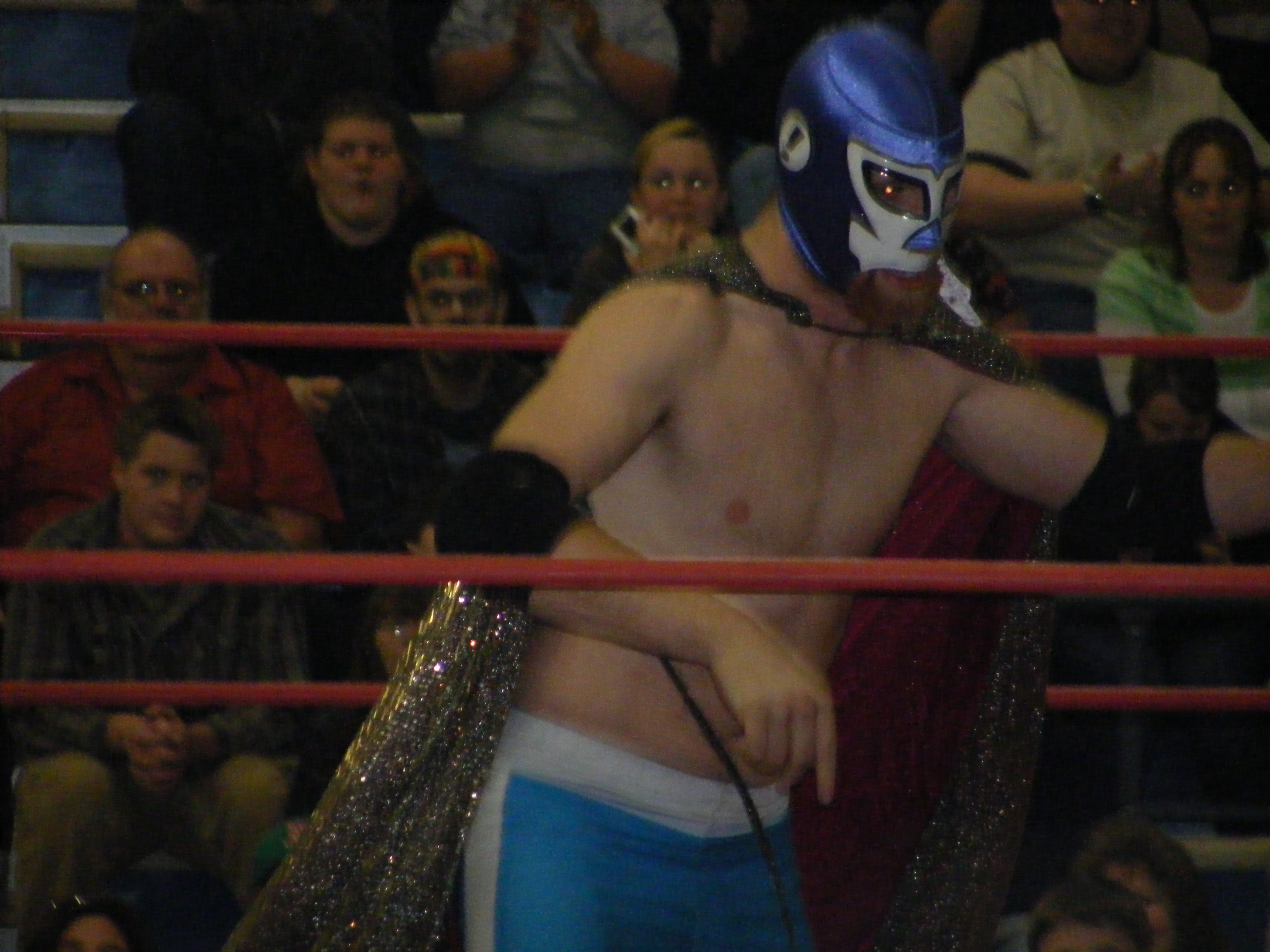
El Generico wrestled his farewell match in PWG at the event.

It was followed by a non-tournament match, in which Willie Mack took on B-Boy. Mack delivered a Chocolate Thunder Bomb to B-Boy for the win.

Next, the penultimate match took place. It was a Knockout or Submission Only match between Drake Younger and Sami Callihan. It was the second match in the Best of Three Series to determine the #1 contender for the World Championship. Younger knocked Callihan out with a headbutt and a series of elbows, forcing the referee Rick Knox to stop the match.

=== Final ===
The Young Bucks defended the World Tag Team Championship against El Generico and Kevin Steen in the DDT4 final. Generico had almost won the match by delivering a Yakuza Kick and a Brainbustahhh!! to Nick Jackson but Matt Jackson pulled the referee out of the ring while the referee Rick Knox was counting the pinfall. This prompted Knox to hit Matt with a superkick. Steen then delivered a package piledriver to Matt and Generico tried to deliver a Brainbustahhh!! to Matt but Matt countered with a small package and pinned Generico to retain the titles and win their third DDT4. After the match, Generico cut a farewell promo where he hugged Steen in the ring and then addressed the fans, saying that he was going back to Mexico (kayfabe) to take care of the orphans.

== Reception ==
DDT4 received mixed reviews from critics.

Jake St-Pierre of 411Mania rated the event 7.5, considering it "an easy watch", with no "actively bad matches present" on the card, but "the final product" was disappointing as "compared to the DDT4's of 2009, 2011, and 2012". According to him, "El Generico's final appearances (and The Young Bucks, I must say) carried this show and really made it fun, but it doesn't really plateau as much as Mystery Vortex did." He further stated that "As a show, this is a fun, consistent watch, but as a PWG show, it's a little underwhelming."

Jerome Cusson of Pro Wrestling Ponderings stated that the event was not "the kind of must buy show as DDT4 2012 was", but felt that the event had "still a great deal to enjoy." According to him, the "action on this show was high quality" and the "crowd was jacked and ready to explode on multiple occasions". He said that DDT4 met "the high standards in some ways but did not live up to its potential and reputation because of both the finishes and booking decisions." He directed criticism towards Michael Elgin and Brian Cage's short title reign, feeling that "Given the standings of both men within the world of independent wrestling, their first PWG titles should have meant more". He also criticized Super Smash Brothers' quick loss in the opening round, stating that it was "unfortunate to see the most pushed team of 2012 be eliminated in such a low key way during the first round of a tournament they won last year." However, he praised B-Boy and Willie Mack's contest as "a surprisingly fun match", but considered Drake Younger and Sami Callihan's outing as "the dumbest match of 2013", due to "taking the types of bumps they did in their match", with "Younger taking unprotected chairshots in particular." Overall, he felt that "Despite some issues, there’s still a lot to enjoy about Pro Wrestling Guerilla."

TJ Hawke of 411Mania rated it 7.0, considering it to be "the weakest PWG show since World's Finest" and PWG's "off show of 2013". He said that "The clear highlight of the show was the Generico sendoff", pushing "the show over the top in terms of being a recommendation (as there was enough solid wrestling on the show justify the time and money needed to watch it)." He felt that the only interesting matches of the event were "the opener and the main event."

== Aftermath ==
Upon leaving PWG and joining WWE, Rami Sebei stopped using the El Generico character, and began wrestling without the mask, adopting the ring name "Sami Zayn".

The Best of Three Series between Sami Callihan and Drake Younger continued, concluding with a Guerrilla Warfare on the first night of All Star Weekend 9. Younger won the match and the series with a lead of 2–1, thus earning a World Championship title shot against Adam Cole on the second night.

== Results ==
No.	Results	Stipulations	Times
1	The Young Bucks (Matt Jackson and Nick Jackson) defeated The Inner City Machine Guns (Rich Swann and Ricochet)	Tag team match in the quarter-final round of Dynamite Duumvirate Tag Team Title Tournament	12:24
2	Unbreakable F'N Machines (Brian Cage and Michael Elgin) defeated Super Smash Brothers (Player Uno and Stupefied) (c)	Tag team match for the PWG World Tag Team Championship in the quarter-final round of Dynamite Duumvirate Tag Team Title Tournament	14:29
3	Future Shock (Adam Cole and Kyle O'Reilly) defeated Dojo Bros (Eddie Edwards and Roderick Strong)	Tag team match in the quarter-final round of Dynamite Duumvirate Tag Team Title Tournament	19:30
4	El Generico and Kevin Steen defeated The Briscoe Brothers (Jay Briscoe and Mark Briscoe)	Tag team match in the quarter-final round of Dynamite Duumvirate Tag Team Title Tournament	11:22
5	The Young Bucks (Matt Jackson and Nick Jackson) defeated Unbreakable F'N Machines (Brian Cage and Michael Elgin) (c)	Tag team match for the PWG World Tag Team Championship in the semi-final round of Dynamite Duumvirate Tag Team Title Tournament	16:21
6	El Generico and Kevin Steen defeated Future Shock (Adam Cole and Kyle O'Reilly)	Tag team match in the semi-final round of Dynamite Duumvirate Tag Team Title Tournament	8:46
7	Willie Mack defeated B-Boy	Singles match	9:08
8	Drake Younger defeated Sami Callihan (1–1)	Knockout or Submission Only match Match two in a Best of Three Series to determine the #1 contender for the PWG World Championship	15:28
9	The Young Bucks (Matt Jackson and Nick Jackson) (c) defeated El Generico and Kevin Steen	Tag team match for the PWG World Tag Team Championship in the Dynamite Duumvirate Tag Team Title Tournament final	16:36
(c) / – the champion(s) heading into the match

=== Tournament brackets ===
First round
Briscoe Brothers	Pin
Generico/Steen
DojoBros	Pin
Future Shock
Inner City Machine Guns	Pin
Young Bucks
Unbreakable F'n Machines	Pin
Super Smash Brothers

Semifinals
Generico/Steen	Pin
Future Shock
Young Bucks	Pin
Unbreakable F'n Machines

Final
Generico/Steen	Pin
Young Bucks
