= Dynamite Duumvirate Tag Team Title Tournament (2015) =

2015 professional wrestling tournament by PWG

- Promotion: Pro Wrestling Guerrilla
- Date: May 22, 2015
- City: Reseda, California
- Venue: American Legion Post #308

Event chronology
← Previous; Don't Sweat The Technique	Next → Mystery Vortex III

Dynamite Duumvirate Tag Team Title Tournament chronology
← Previous; 2014	Next → Last

Dynamite Duumvirate Tag Team Title Tournament (2015) was the ninth and final Dynamite Duumvirate Tag Team Title Tournament (DDT4) produced by Pro Wrestling Guerrilla (PWG). The event took place on May 22, 2015 at the American Legion Post #308 in Reseda, California.

The PWG World Tag Team Championship was defended in the tournament and marked the first time that the title changed hands in each round of the tournament. Monster Mafia (Ethan Page and Josh Alexander) defeated the defending champions World's Cutest Tag Team (Candice LeRae and Joey Ryan) to win the titles in the quarter-final. Beaver Boys (Alex Reynolds and John Silver) would then defeat Monster Mafia in the semi-final to win the titles. And then, the team of Andrew Everett and Trevor Lee defeated Beaver Boys in the final to win the DDT4 and the championship.

== Production ==
=== Background ===
On April 5, 2015, PWG announced on its official PWG Twitter account that the 2015 edition of DDT4 would be held on May 22, 2015 at the American Legion Post #308 in Reseda, California.

=== Storylines ===
==== Original line-up ====
It was announced that the PWG World Tag Team Championship would be defended in the tournament. The participants announced for the DDT4 were:

- World Tag Team Champions World's Cutest Tag Team (Candice LeRae and Joey Ryan)
- Andrew Everett and Trevor Lee
- Beaver Boys (Alex Reynolds and John Silver)
- The Keepers of the Lariat (Biff Busick and Drew Gulak)
- The Inner City Machine Guns (Rich Swann and Ricochet)
- Chris Sabin and Matt Sydal
- Monster Mafia (Ethan Page and Josh Alexander)
- Team Tremendous (Bill Carr and Dan Barry)

==== Replacement ====
On May 21, Chris Sabin was pulled from the tournament due to a back injury and replaced by Mike Bailey.

==== Other matches ====
Aside from the tournament, it was announced that Roderick Strong would defend the PWG World Championship against Brian Cage and Chris Hero in a three-way match. A match between Johnny Gargano and Mike Bailey was also announced for DDT4. However, after Bailey would replace an injured Chris Sabin as Matt Sydal's partner for DDT4, T.J. Perkins was announced as his replacement to face Gargano at DDT4.

== Event ==
=== Quarterfinals ===
DDT4 started with a match between The Beaver Boys (Alex Reynolds and John Silver) and the debuting Team Tremendous (Bill Carr and Dan Barry). Team Tremendous delivered an electric chair, cutter combination to Silver but Reynolds got the pin with a schoolboy by grabbing a handful of tights.

Next, The Inner City Machine Guns (Rich Swann and Ricochet) took on The Keepers of the Lariat (Biff Busick and Drew Gulak). Ricochet knocked out Gulak with a Benadryller, allowing Swann to deliver a 450° splash to Gulak from the middle rope for the win.

Next, Andrew Everett and Trevor Lee took on Love Ball (Matt Sydal and Mike Bailey). Lee knocked out Bailey by hitting a Collision Course and then Lee and Everett delivered an assisted 630° senton to Bailey for the win.

It was followed by the final match in the quarterfinal, in which World's Cutest Tag Team (Candice LeRae and Joey Ryan) defended the World Tag Team Championship against Monster Mafia (Ethan Page and Josh Alexander). The referee was knocked out while LeRae attempted to deliver a reverse hurricanrana to Alexander but Alexander caught her. This allowed Roderick Strong to interfere in the match as he delivered a Sick Kick to LeRae and followed it with an End of Heartache. Monster Mafia then delivered a double facebuster to Ryan to win the titles.

=== Semifinals ===
The semifinal round of DDT4 began with Monster Mafia defending the World Tag Team Championship against Beaver Boys. John Silver hit Ethan Page with the World Tag Team Championship title belt while the referee was distracted, allowing Silver to pin Page to win the titles.

In the next match, Inner City Machine Guns took on Andrew Everett and Trevor Lee. Lee and Everett first knocked out Swann when Lee delivered an Orange Crush to Swann and Everett followed it with a Frankendriver. Lee then knocked Ricochet out of the ring with a suicide dive and Everett capitalized on it by pinning Swann for the win.

=== Non-tournament matches ===
Two non-tournament matches took place after the conclusion of the semifinal round. In the first match, Johnny Gargano took on T.J. Perkins. Gargano countered a cross armbreaker by Perkins into a Garga-No-Escape to make him submit for the win.

In the next match, Roderick Strong defended the World Championship against Chris Hero and Brian Cage in a three way match. Strong countered a cradle piledriver by Hero into a jumping high knee and delivered Sick Kicks to Hero and Cage, and then pinned Cage to retain the title.

=== Final ===
In the final round of DDT4, Beaver Boys defended the World Tag Team Championship against Andrew Everett and Trevor Lee. Alex Reynolds tried to hit Lee with the title belt but Lee countered and pinned Reynolds with a small package to win the titles and the DDT4 tournament.

== Reception ==
DDT4 received mixed reviews from critics upon release of the DVD.

Larry of Voices of Wrestling felt that the event "succeeds mildly" because "Nothing pops off the screen as a real must see match, nor is the story all that compelling despite three title changes in one night." He stated that it was "a decent show that would provide a nice alternative to your token three hours of RAW on one of these hot summer nights", with "The introduction of some new teams, too, was a step in the right direction for PWG. You have a large influx of tag team talent that can be used in upcoming events that were quickly established over the past few events. Considering the loss of a lot of the top talent that is now tied up in ROH or Global Force, this is going to help fill out those future cards nicely." According to him, most of the matches "fell flat", "even though some matches still were winners."

Jake St-Pierre of 411Mania praised the event, rating it 8.5. He considered the 2015 edition of DDT4 to "the best since 2012's". He stated that "Trevor Lee and Andrew Everett were freaks of nature the entire way through this show", with "three four-star matches in one night". According to him, "The only letdown was Gulak & Busick vs. The Machine Guns, and that was more inoffensive than actively bad", and "Everything else ranged from good to off-the-charts."

TJ Hawke of 411Mania rated the event, a score of 2.5, considering DDT4 to be "an exceptionally bad professional wrestling show from the supposed number one independent wrestling company in the world" and felt that it was "possibly the worst indie show of the year". He further stated that "The quality control here was just awful, as it came across like the inmates were running the asylum. All four first found matches taking up twenty minutes of screentime (between introductions and matches)."

== Aftermath ==
World's Cutest Tag Team and Monster Mafia competed in a DDT4 rematch at Mystery Vortex III, which World's Cutest Tag Team won. It was Josh Alexander's last match in PWG as he temporarily retired from wrestling due to a neck surgery.

== Results ==
No.	Results	Stipulations	Times
1	The Beaver Boys (Alex Reynolds and John Silver) defeated Team Tremendous (Bill Carr and Dan Barry)	Tag team match in the quarter-final round of Dynamite Duumvirate Tag Team Title Tournament	17:13
2	The Inner City Machine Guns (Rich Swann and Ricochet) defeated The Keepers of the Lariat (Biff Busick and Drew Gulak)	Tag team match in the quarter-final round of Dynamite Duumvirate Tag Team Title Tournament	21:44
3	Andrew Everett and Trevor Lee defeated Love Ball (Matt Sydal and Mike Bailey)	Tag team match in the quarter-final round of Dynamite Duumvirate Tag Team Title Tournament	17:00
4	Monster Mafia (Ethan Page and Josh Alexander) defeated World's Cutest Tag Team (Candice LeRae and Joey Ryan) (c)	Tag team match for the PWG World Tag Team Championship in the quarter-final round of Dynamite Duumvirate Tag Team Title Tournament	17:33
5	The Beaver Boys (Alex Reynolds and John Silver) defeated Monster Mafia (Ethan Page and Josh Alexander) (c)	Tag team match in the semi-final round of Dynamite Duumvirate Tag Team Title Tournament	9:55
6	Andrew Everett and Trevor Lee defeated The Inner City Machine Guns (Rich Swann and Ricochet)	Tag team match for the PWG World Tag Team Championship in the semi-final round of Dynamite Duumvirate Tag Team Title Tournament	14:31
7	Johnny Gargano defeated T.J. Perkins	Singles match	12:34
8	Roderick Strong (c) defeated Brian Cage and Chris Hero	Three Way match for the PWG World Championship	21:00
9	Andrew Everett and Trevor Lee defeated The Beaver Boys (Alex Reynolds and John Silver) (c)	Tag team match for the PWG World Tag Team Championship in the Dynamite Duumvirate Tag Team Title Tournament final	16:52
(c) / – the champion(s) heading into the match

=== Tournament brackets ===
First round
Beaver Boys	Pin
Team Tremendous
Monster Mafia	Pin
World's Cutest Tag Team
Keepers of the Lariat	Pin
ICMG
Everett/Lee	Pin
Love Ball

Semifinals
Beaver Boys	Pin
Monster Mafia
ICMG	Pin
Everett/Lee

Final
Beaver Boys	Pin
Everett/Lee
