= Dynamite Duumvirate Tag Team Title Tournament (2010) =

2010 professional wrestling tournament by PWG

- Promotion: Pro Wrestling Guerrilla
- Date: May 9, 2010
- City: Reseda, California
- Venue: American Legion Post #308

Event chronology
← Previous; Titannica	Next → DIO!

Dynamite Duumvirate Tag Team Title Tournament chronology
← Previous; 2009	Next → 2011

Dynamite Duumvirate Tag Team Title Tournament (2010) was the fourth Dynamite Duumvirate Tag Team Title Tournament (DDT4) produced by Pro Wrestling Guerrilla (PWG). The event took place on May 9, 2010 at the American Legion Post #308 in Reseda, California.

The PWG World Tag Team Championship was defended throughout the DDT4 tournament. ¡Peligro Abejas! (El Generico and Paul London) won the tournament and the titles by defeating reigning and defending champions The Young Bucks (Matt Jackson and Nick Jackson) in the final. Only one non-tournament match took place at DDT4, in which Chris Hero defeated Brandon Bonham.

== Production ==
=== Background ===
In April, it was announced that the 2010 edition of DDT4 would take place on May 9, 2010 at the American Legion Post #308 in Reseda, California.

=== Storylines ===
It was announced that the PWG World Tag Team Championship would be defended in the tournament and the defending champions The Young Bucks (Matt Jackson and Nick Jackson) would defend the titles against Jerome Robinson and Johnny Goodtime in the opening round of the tournament. The other teams announced were:

- The Briscoe Brothers (Jay Briscoe and Mark Briscoe)
- Chuck Taylor and Scott Lost
- The Cutler Brothers (Brandon Cutler and Dustin Cutler)
- KAMIKAZE (Akira Tozawa and YAMATO)
- ¡Peligro Abejas! (El Generico and Paul London)
- Roderick Strong and Ryan Taylor

== Event ==
=== Quarterfinals ===
The quarterfinal round of the DDT4 started with The Young Bucks (Matt Jackson and Nick Jackson) defending the PWG World Tag Team Championship against Jerome Robinson and Johnny Goodtime. After a combination of double-team maneuvers, Young Bucks knocked Robinson out by delivering the Superkick Party four times to win the match and retain the titles.

Next, ¡Peligro Abejas! (El Generico and Paul London) took on Chuck Taylor and Scott Lost. Lost accidentally hit Taylor with a double stomp in the corner, allowing Generico to deliver a Brainbustahhh!!! to Taylor. London followed by performing a shooting star press on Taylor for the win.

Next, The Cutler Brothers (Brandon Cutler and Dustin Cutler) took on Roderick Strong and Ryan Taylor. Brandon knocked out Strong after countering a plancha attempt by Strong by tossing him into the ring post. Cutlers then delivered a tandem bridging reverse piledriver to Taylor for the win.

It was followed by the final match in the quarterfinal round between The Briscoe Brothers (Jay Briscoe and Mark Briscoe) and KAMIKAZE (Akira Tozawa and YAMATO). Mark knocked YAMATO out of the ring after hitting a superkick. Jay then delivered a Crucible to Tozawa, and Briscoes followed it by performing an electric chair and springboard diving clothesline combination on Tozawa for the win.

=== Semifinals ===
The semifinal round of the DDT4 began with The Young Bucks defending the World Tag Team Championship against Cutler Brothers. Young Bucks delivered a More Bang For Your Buck (rolling fireman's carry slam by Matt followed by a 450° splash by Nick followed by a moonsault by Matt) to Dustin Cutler to retain the titles and advance to the tournament final.

In the following match, Briscoe Brothers took on ¡Peligro Abejas!. Briscoes tried to deliver an electric chair and springboard diving clothesline combination to Generico but Generico countered by pinning Jay Briscoe with a victory roll.

It was followed by a non-tournament match, in which Chris Hero took on Brandon Bonham. Hero caught Bonham with a Rolling Elbow while Bonham tried to attack him with a corner dropkick. Hero followed it by delivering a Hero's Welcome to Bonham from the top rope for the win.

=== Final ===
In the tournament final, Young Bucks defended the World Tag Team Championship against ¡Peligro Abejas!. London delivered a low blow to Matt and hit a spin kick to Nick on the top rope, allowing Generico to deliver a Brainbustahhh!!! to Nick from the top rope to win the DDT4 tournament and the World Tag Team Championship in the process.

== Reception ==
Jerome Cusson of Pro Wrestling Ponderings considered DDT4 "A consistently great tournament that featured three four star matches (all starring The Young Bucks) and a number of three star matches." He felt that it was not "as good as last year’s tournament" but gave "Highest recommendation for one of the best indy shows of the year so far."

Ryan Rozanski rated the event 8.5, praising it as "an incredibly consistent show", with "Quality wrestling with the right intangibles." He praised the "fun factor" considering that "(Paul) London was actually comical throughout the night". He specifically appreciated The Young Bucks for delivering "three extremely entertaining matches" and felt that "the historic moment of London and Generico finally dethroning the Young Bucks" was a major highlight of the event.

TJ Hawke also rated it 8.5, stating it "a clear step down from the 2009 DDT4" but recommended it majorly for "the incredibly charming Peligro Abejas team that stole the heart of many", considering it "reason enough to buy this DVD."

== Aftermath ==
Young Bucks received a rematch for the World Tag Team Championship against ¡Peligro Abejas! in a Guerrilla Warfare, also involving The Cutler Brothers, at Seven. ¡Peligro Abejas! retained the titles.

== Results ==
No.	Results	Stipulations	Times
1	The Young Bucks (Matt Jackson and Nick Jackson) (c) defeated Jerome Robinson and Johnny Goodtime	Tag team match for the PWG World Tag Team Championship in the quarter-final round of Dynamite Duumvirate Tag Team Title Tournament	9:14
2	¡Peligro Abejas! (El Generico and Paul London) defeated Chuck Taylor and Scott Lost	Tag team match in the quarter-final round of Dynamite Duumvirate Tag Team Title Tournament	10:16
3	The Cutler Brothers (Brandon Cutler and Dustin Cutler) defeated Roderick Strong and Ryan Taylor	Tag team match in the quarter-final round of Dynamite Duumvirate Tag Team Title Tournament	12:12
4	The Briscoe Brothers (Jay Briscoe and Mark Briscoe) defeated KAMIKAZE (Akira Tozawa and YAMATO)	Tag team match in the quarter-final round of Dynamite Duumvirate Tag Team Title Tournament	15:02
5	The Young Bucks (Matt Jackson and Nick Jackson) (c) defeated The Cutler Brothers (Brandon Cutler and Dustin Cutler)	Tag team match for the PWG World Tag Team Championship in the semi-final round of Dynamite Duumvirate Tag Team Title Tournament	19:07
6	¡Peligro Abejas! (El Generico and Paul London) defeated The Briscoe Brothers (Jay Briscoe and Mark Briscoe)	Tag team match in the semi-final round of Dynamite Duumvirate Tag Team Title Tournament	11:12
7	Chris Hero defeated Brandon Bonham	Singles match	19:50
8	¡Peligro Abejas! (El Generico and Paul London) defeated The Young Bucks (Matt Jackson and Nick Jackson) (c)	Tag team match for the PWG World Tag Team Championship in the Dynamite Duumvirate Tag Team Title Tournament final	12:34
(c) / – the champion(s) heading into the match

=== Tournament brackets ===
First round
The Young Bucks	Pin
Goodtime/Robinson
Cutler Brothers	Pin
Strong/Taylor
Taylor/Lost	Pin
¡Peligro Abejas!
Briscoe Brothers	Pin
KAMIKAZE

Semifinals
The Young Bucks	Pin
Cutler Brothers
¡Peligro Abejas!	Pin
Briscoe Brothers

Final
The Young Bucks	Pin
¡Peligro Abejas!
