= Dynamite Duumvirate Tag Team Title Tournament (2011) =

2011 professional wrestling tournament by PWG

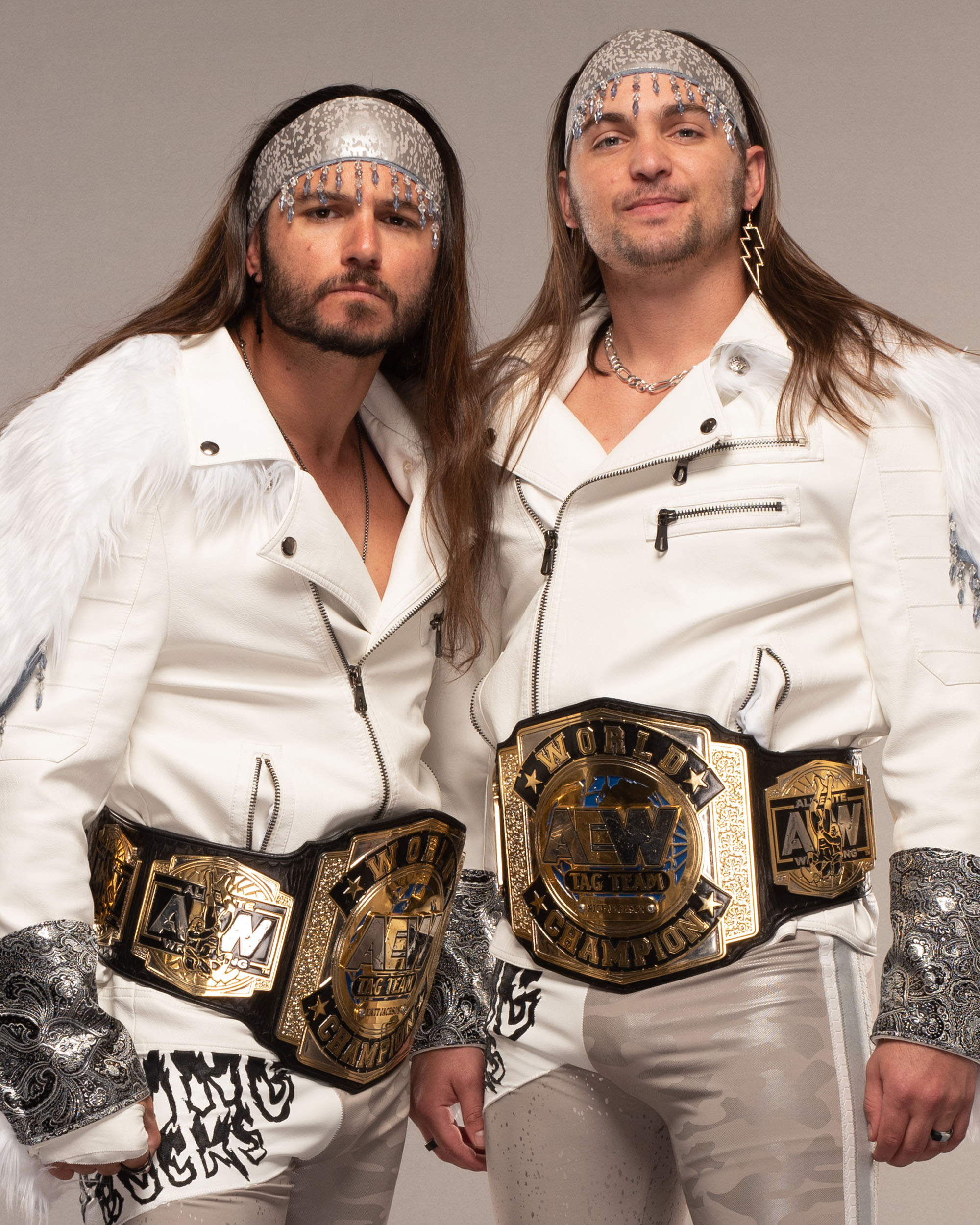
- The 2011 tournament winners The Young Bucks
- Promotion: Pro Wrestling Guerrilla
- Date: March 4, 2011
- City: Reseda, California
- Venue: American Legion Post #308

Event chronology
← Previous; Kurt RussellReunion 2: The Reunioning	Next → Card Subject To Change III

Dynamite Duumvirate Tag Team Title Tournament chronology
← Previous; 2010	Next → 2012

Dynamite Duumvirate Tag Team Title Tournament (2011) was the fifth Dynamite Duumvirate Tag Team Title Tournament (DDT4) produced by Pro Wrestling Guerrilla (PWG). The event took place on March 4, 2011 at the American Legion Post #308 in Reseda, California.

It was an eight-team tournament to determine the #1 contenders for the PWG World Tag Team Championship. The Young Bucks (Matt Jackson and Nick Jackson) defeated Nightmare Violence Connection (Akira Tozawa and Kevin Steen) in the final to win the tournament. Apart from the tournament, a gauntlet match took place where the winner would wrestle Joey Ryan in an immediate match for Ryan's future PWG World Championship title shot on the line that he earned by winning the Battle of Los Angeles. Candice LeRae won the gauntlet and lost to Ryan in the immediate match.

== Production ==
=== Background ===
In February, it was announced that the 2011 edition of DDT4 would take place on March 4, 2011 at the American Legion Post #308 in Reseda, California.

=== Storylines ===
Unlike the previous yearly tradition, the PWG World Tag Team Championship would not be defended in the 2011 tournament, as the reigning champions ¡Peligro Abejas! (El Generico and Paul London), were not entered into the tournament. Instead, it would be used to determine their number one contenders. The participants announced for the tournament were:

- The American Wolves (Davey Richards and Eddie Edwards)
- Brandon Gatson and Willie Mack
- Briscoe Brothers (Jay Briscoe and Mark Briscoe)
- Cutler Brothers (Brandon Cutler and Dustin Cutler)
- Kings of Wrestling (Chris Hero and Claudio Castagnoli)
- Nightmare Violence Connection (Akira Tozawa and Kevin Steen)
- The RockNES Monsters (Johnny Goodtime and Johnny Yuma)
- The Young Bucks (Matt Jackson and Nick Jackson)

== Event ==
=== Quarterfinals ===
The DDT4 began with a match between the team of Brandon Gatson and Willie Mack and The Young Bucks (Matt Jackson and Nick Jackson). Nick knocked Gatson off the top rope with a superkick, and then Young Bucks delivered an Early On-set Alzheimers to Mack for the win.

Next, The American Wolves (Davey Richards and Eddie Edwards) took on The RockNES Monsters (Johnny Goodtime and Johnny Yuma). American Wolves delivered a Force of Nature to Goodtime, and Edwards applied an Achilles lock on Goodtime to make him submit for the win.

Next, Kings of Wrestling (Chris Hero and Claudio Castagnoli) took on The Cutler Brothers (Brandon Cutler and Dustin Cutler). After performing a Helicopter Crash (giant swing by Castagnoli and a running dropkick by Hero combination) on Dustin, Kings of Wrestling delivered two bicycle kicks to Dustin for the win.

It was followed by the final match in the quarterfinal, in which The Briscoe Brothers (Jay Briscoe and Mark Briscoe) took on The Nightmare Violence Connection (Akira Tozawa and Kevin Steen). NVC delivered an electric chair and springboard shining wizard combination to Jay for the win.

=== Semifinals ===
The semifinal round of the DDT4 began with a match between The American Wolves and The Young Bucks. American Wolves delivered a Force of Nature to Matt Jackson and Eddie Edwards followed it by applying an Achilles lock on Matt, but Matt rolled through it and pinned Edwards with a small package for the win.

Next, Kings of Wrestling took on Nightmare Violence Connection. Akira Tozawa avoided a moonsault by Chris Hero and pinned him with a La magistral for the win.

After the match, Joey Ryan announced that he would challenge the champion Claudio Castagnoli for the PWG World Championship at Card Subject To Change III on April 9, a title shot Ryan had earned by winning the Battle of Los Angeles. He then issued an open challenge in the Joey Ryan Invitational Gauntlet, with Ryan putting his title shot on the line against the winner of the gauntlet. The first two participants of the gauntlet were Brian Cage-Taylor and Ryan Taylor. Ryan delivered a cravate neckbreaker to Brian to eliminate him. Peter Avalon was the next entrant in the gauntlet. Avalon countered an attempt of The Perfect Circle by Ryan and pinned him with a schoolboy. Candice LeRae entered next, but Ryan delivered a That 70's Kick to Avalon before their match started, allowing LeRae to pin Avalon for the win.

As a result, LeRae won the gauntlet and earned the right to face Ryan in an immediate match with Ryan's World Championship title shot on the line. Ryan avoided a moonsault by LeRae and delivered a That 70's Kick to LeRae. Ryan followed it by applying an End Times on LeRae, forcing her to submit and retain his right to challenge for the World Championship.

=== Final ===
The tournament final took place between Nightmare Violence Connection and The Young Bucks. Young Bucks delivered an Early On-set Alzheimers and a More Bang For Your Buck (rolling fireman's carry slam by Matt followed by a 450° splash by Nick followed by a moonsault by Matt) on Akira Tozawa for the win.

== Reception ==
Jake St. Pierre of 411Mania heavily praised the 2011 edition of DDT4 as "the best DDT4 of all time". He rated the event 9.5, stating that it was the "best friend for three hours" for "a fan of tag team (or indy) wrestling at all".

== Aftermath ==
The events at DDT4 would lead to PWG's next event Card Subject To Change III, as Joey Ryan received his title shot for the World Championship against Claudio Castagnoli, and The Young Bucks received their title shot for the World Tag Team Championship against ¡Peligro Abejas! for winning DDT4. Ryan failed to win the title, while Young Bucks defeated El Generico and Ricochet, a substitute for Generico's championship partner Paul London, to win the World Tag Team Championship.

== Results ==
No.	Results	Stipulations	Times
1	The Young Bucks (Matt Jackson and Nick Jackson) defeated Brandon Gatson and Willie Mack	Tag team match in the quarter-final round of Dynamite Duumvirate Tag Team Title Tournament	11:28
2	The American Wolves (Davey Richards and Eddie Edwards) defeated The RockNES Monsters (Johnny Goodtime and Johnny Yuma)	Tag team match in the quarter-final round of Dynamite Duumvirate Tag Team Title Tournament	20:54
3	Kings of Wrestling (Chris Hero and Claudio Castagnoli) defeated The Cutler Brothers (Brandon Cutler and Dustin Cutler)	Tag team match in the quarter-final round of Dynamite Duumvirate Tag Team Title Tournament	15:22
4	The Nightmare Violence Connection (Akira Tozawa and Kevin Steen) defeated The Briscoe Brothers (Jay Briscoe and Mark Briscoe)	Tag team match in the quarter-final round of Dynamite Duumvirate Tag Team Title Tournament	9:45
5	The Young Bucks (Matt Jackson and Nick Jackson) defeated The American Wolves (Davey Richards and Eddie Edwards)	Tag team match in the semi-final round of Dynamite Duumvirate Tag Team Title Tournament	16:09
6	The Nightmare Violence Connection (Akira Tozawa and Kevin Steen) defeated Kings of Wrestling (Chris Hero and Claudio Castagnoli)	Tag team match in the semi-final round of Dynamite Duumvirate Tag Team Title Tournament	16:46
7	Candice LeRae defeated Brian Cage-Taylor, Peter Avalon and Ryan Taylor	Joey Ryan Invitational Gauntlet to determine Joey Ryan's opponent in the next match	15:51
8	Joey Ryan defeated Candice LeRae	Singles match to determine the #1 contender for the PWG World Championship	9:05
9	The Young Bucks (Matt Jackson and Nick Jackson) defeated The Nightmare Violence Connection (Akira Tozawa and Kevin Steen)	Tag team match in the Dynamite Duumvirate Tag Team Title Tournament final	20:24

=== Tournament brackets ===
First round
The Young Bucks	Pin
Gatson/Mack
American Wolves	Sub
RockNES Monsters
Kings of Wrestling	Pin
Cutler Brothers
NVC	Pin
Briscoe Brothers

Semifinals
The Young Bucks	Pin
American Wolves
Kings of Wrestling	Pin
NVC

Final
The Young Bucks	Pin
NVC
