= Dynamite Duumvirate Tag Team Title Tournament (2007) =

2007 professional wrestling tournament by PWG

- Promotion: Pro Wrestling Guerrilla
- Date: Night One: May 19, 2007; Night Two: May 20, 2007
- City: Burbank, California
- Venue: Burbank Armory
- Attendance: Combined: 850; Night One: 450; Night Two: 400

Event chronology
← Previous; All Star Weekend V	Next → Roger Dorn Night

Dynamite Duumvirate Tag Team Title Tournament chronology
← Previous; First	Next → 2008

Dynamite Duumvirate Tag Team Title Tournament (2007) was the first Dynamite Duumvirate Tag Team Title Tournament (DDT4) produced by Pro Wrestling Guerrilla (PWG). It was a two-night event, taking place on May 19 and May 20, 2007 at the Burbank Armory in Burbank, California.

It was an eight-team tournament contested for the vacant PWG World Tag Team Championship. PAC and Roderick Strong defeated The Briscoe Brothers (Jay Briscoe and Mark Briscoe) in the final to win the inaugural DDT4 tournament and the vacant titles.

== Production ==
=== Background ===
On March 14, 2007, it was announced that an eight-team tournament would take place for the vacant PWG World Tag Team Championship across two nights on May 19 and May 20, 2007 at the Bernard Milken Jewish Community Centre in West Hills, Los Angeles, California. The tournament, later titled Dynamite Duumvirate Tag Team Title Tournament (DDT4) after the DDT finishing move, was later shifted to Burbank Armory in Burbank, California.

=== Storylines ===
==== Original line-up ====
At Guitarmageddon II: Armorygeddon, Cape Fear (El Generico and Quicksilver) successfully defended the PWG World Tag Team Championship against Davey Richards and Roderick Strong. However, Quicksilver suffered a major concussion during the match, resulting in Excalibur, the newly appointed Commissioner of Food and Beverage, to strip Cape Fear of the titles at Album of the Year. PWG Commissioner Dino Winwood announced that a tournament would occur to determine the new champions. The originally announced participants of DDT4 were:

- Arrogance (Chris Bosh and Scott Lost)
- The Briscoe Brothers (Jay Briscoe and Mark Briscoe)
- Jack Evans and Roderick Strong
- The Motor City Machine Guns (Alex Shelley and Chris Sabin)
- The Havana Pitbulls (Ricky Reyes and Rocky Romero)
- The Kings of Wrestling (Chris Hero and Claudio Castagnoli)
- Muscle Outlaw'z (Masato Yoshino and Naruki Doi)
- Davey Richards and a mystery partner

==== Replacements ====
Due to PWG terminating its working relationship with Total Nonstop Action Wrestling in May, TNA-contracted wrestlers Motor City Machine Guns were unable to compete in DDT4. As a result, Dino Winwood replaced Motor City Machine Guns with The Trailer Park Boyz (Josh Abercrombie and Nate Webb). Jack Evans was forced to withdraw from the competition due to commitments in Japan, forcing him to be replaced by PAC as Roderick Strong's partner. Davey Richards' former co-holder of the World Tag Team Championship, Super Dragon was revealed to be his partner in DDT4.

==== Non-tournament matches ====
PAC was originally scheduled to compete against Bryan Danielson's opponent on the night one of DDT4, but after PAC's participation in DDT4, CIMA was announced as his replacement.

Dino Winwood awarded a PWG World Championship title shot to Kevin Steen on the night one of DDT4, against El Generico. A match was scheduled by Steen and Ronin on night two, which would become a title match if Steen was able to beat Generico for the title. Similarly, a match was scheduled between Generico and CIMA on night two, which would become a World Championship match if Generico was able to retain the title against Steen.

After losing to Davey Richards in the opening round of the 2006 Battle of Los Angeles, Ronin began a quest to participate in the 2007 Battle of the Los Angeles and win the tournament. This quest was called Battle of Los Angeles Tour. He embarked on a nine-match winning streak to convince PWG management to include him in the tournament. At 70/30, Ronin competed against Kevin Steen in a #1 contender's match for the PWG World Championship, but the match abruptly ended after Joey Ryan interfered in the match by attacking Steen. At All Star Weekend V, Ronin pinned Ryan's friend Karl Anderson in a six-man tag team match, but Anderson attacked Ronin after the match. As a result, an enraged Ronin challenged Ryan to a match on the night one of DDT4, but Ryan refused to wrestle if there was no benefit to him. Ronin agreed to put his Battle of the Los Angeles spot on the line in the match to convince Ryan to wrestle. However, Excalibur announced that Ryan must put something on the line as well, and Ryan agreed to put his hair on the line.

== Reception ==
TJ Hawke of 411Mania gave mixed reviews to night one of the tournament, rating it 6.5. He considered the event, "a mixed bag", stating "that the non-tournament matches delivered more consistently than the tournament ones." He felt that "The Havana Pitbulls and Trailer Park Boys were subtractions by addition", and enjoyed "the Briscoes/Kings match more than I expected."

He felt that the night two was "an incredibly underwhelming show given the level of talent involved." According to him, "Bryan Danielson and Kevin Steen were completely wasted." He stated that "The tournament matches continued to disappoint (up until the finals)."

== Aftermath ==
The feud between Scorpio Sky and Joey Ryan continued as Sky cost Ryan, a match against Tyler Black at Roger Dorn Night. After the match, Ryan demanded that Commissioner Dino Winwood prevent Sky from appearing in PWG. Winwood then scheduled an unsanctioned street fight between Sky and Ryan at Giant-Size Annual #4, due to Sky unable to compete in PWG after losing a Loser Leaves PWG match to Frankie Kazarian at Based On A True Story earlier in the year. The match stipulated that Sky would be no longer allowed to appear in any PWG event if he lost but if he won, he would be reinstated.

== Results ==
Night 1 (May 19)
No.	Results	Stipulations	Times
1	Don Fujii defeated Stalker Ichikawa	Singles match	7:36
2	The Briscoe Brothers (Jay Briscoe and Mark Briscoe) defeated Kings of Wrestling (Chris Hero and Claudio Castagnoli)	Tag team match in the quarter-final round of the Dynamite Duumvirate Tag Team Title Tournament	17:54
3	TJ Perkins defeated Bino Gambino	Singles match	15:37
4	The Havana Pitbulls (Ricky Reyes and Rocky Romero) defeated The Trailer Park Boyz (Josh Abercrombie and Nate Webb)	Tag team match in the quarter-final round of the Dynamite Duumvirate Tag Team Title Tournament	14:56
5	Bryan Danielson versus CIMA ended in a time limit draw	Singles match	30:00
6	Masato Yoshino and Naruki Doi defeated Arrogance (Chris Bosh and Scott Lost)	Tag team match in the quarter-final round of the Dynamite Duumvirate Tag Team Title Tournament	18:22
7	Joey Ryan defeated Ronin	Joey Ryan's hair vs. Ronin's spot in Battle of Los Angeles	11:21
8	PAC and Roderick Strong defeated Davey Richards and Super Dragon	Tag team match in the quarter-final round of the Dynamite Duumvirate Tag Team Title Tournament	30:47
9	El Generico (c) defeated Kevin Steen	Singles match for the PWG World Championship	17:03
(c) / – the champion(s) heading into the match

Night 2 (May 20)
No.	Results	Stipulations	Times
1	Top Gun Talwar defeated Stalker Ichikawa	Singles match	6:39
2	The Briscoe Brothers (Jay Briscoe and Mark Briscoe) defeated The Havana Pitbulls (Ricky Reyes and Rocky Romero)	Tag team match in the semi-final round of the Dynamite Duumvirate Tag Team Title Tournament	17:12
3	Kevin Steen defeated Ronin	Singles match	9:29
4	PAC and Roderick Strong defeated Masato Yoshino and Naruki Doi	Tag team match in the semi-final round of the Dynamite Duumvirate Tag Team Title Tournament	16:50
5	El Generico (c) defeated CIMA	Singles match for the PWG World Championship	16:10
6	Human Tornado defeated Bino Gambino, Don Fujii and TJ Perkins	Four Corners match	10:35
7	Bryan Danielson defeated Joey Ryan	Singles match	18:12
8	Kings of Wrestling (Chris Hero and Claudio Castagnoli) and The Trailer Park Boyz (Josh Abercrombie and Nate Webb) defeated Arrogance (Chris Bosh and Scott Lost), Davey Richards and Super Dragon	Eight-man tag team match	22:08
9	PAC and Roderick Strong defeated The Briscoe Brothers (Jay Briscoe and Mark Briscoe)	Tag team match in the Dynamite Duumvirate Tag Team Title Tournament final for the vacant PWG World Tag Team Championship	19:21
(c) / – the champion(s) heading into the match

=== Tournament brackets ===
First round
The Briscoe Brothers	Pin
The Kings of Wrestling	17:54
The Havana Pitbulls	Pin
The Trailer Park Boyz	14:56
The Muscle Outlaw'z	Pin
Arrogance	18:22
Pac and Strong	Pin
Richards and Super Dragon	30:47

Semifinals
The Briscoe Brothers	Pin
The Havana Pitbulls	17:12
The Muscle Outlaw'z	Pin
Pac and Strong	16:50

Final
The Briscoe Brothers	Pin
Pac and Strong	19:21
