= Inner City Machine Guns =

Professional wrestling stable

Stable
- Members: Rich Swann; Ricochet
- Debut: March 12, 2012
- Disbanded: August 30, 2015
- Years active: 2012–2015

The Inner City Machine Guns was a professional wrestling tag team consisting of Rich Swann and Ricochet, which competed in various independent promotions, such as Dragon Gate, Evolve, Pro Wrestling Guerrilla, Revolution Pro Wrestling, and Westside Xtreme Wrestling.

Swann and Ricochet began teaming with each other as members of the World-1 International faction in the Dragon Gate promotion in 2012, and soon expanded into other promotions. The team was moderately successful, winning RevPro's British Tag Team Championship once.

== History ==
=== Dragon Gate (2012–2014) ===
After competing in other alliances, Rich Swann and Ricochet were paired with each other for the first time in Dragon Gate during the Glorious Gate tour on March 12, 2012, competing against Akira Tozawa and BxB Hulk in a losing effort. At Memorial Gate in Wakayama, Masato Yoshino formed the WORLD-1 International faction with Naruki Doi, Pac and Swann. Ricochet later joined the group as its fifth member. Various group members occasionally teamed with each other, with Swann and Ricochet representing the group in tag team matches on various occasions against groups such as Akatsuki, Jimmyz, Mad Blankey and Team Veteran Returns, throughout the year. They also competed at Dragon Gate's US subsidiary, first wrestling together at Enter The Dragon pay-per-view event, where they faced AR Fox and CIMA for the vacant Open the United Gate Championship in a losing effort. They also appeared at Uprising pay-per-view, where they lost to Super Smash Brothers (Player Uno and Stupefied).

At Mercury Rising on April 7, 2013, Swann and Ricochet teamed with WORLD-1 International teammate Johnny Gargano to defeat CIMA, Eita and Tomahawk TT. In May, Swann and Ricochet teamed with Masato Yoshino and Naruki Doi to represent their faction in the go baaan Cup 8 Man Tag Tournament, losing to the eventual winners Jimmyz in the semi-final round. They would then lose to Team Veteran Returns in a match for the third place in the tournament. At Enter The Dragon in July, Inner City Machine Guns unsuccessfully challenged The Young Bucks (Matt Jackson and Nick Jackson) for the Open the United Gate Championship. Their next major performance in Dragon Gate occurred at the 2014 Mercury Rising, where they teamed with AR Fox to participate in the Six Man Tag Team Tournament. They defeated Chris Hero, Masato Tanaka and Roderick Strong in the semifinal but lost to The Premier Athlete Brand (Anthony Nese, Caleb Konley and Trent Barreta) in a three-way final, also involving Fire Ant, Green Ant and Lince Dorado.

=== Pro Wrestling Guerrilla (2013–2015) ===
Inner City Machine Guns debuted as a team in Pro Wrestling Guerrilla by participating in the 2013 Dynamite Duumvirate Tag Team Title Tournament. They were eliminated by the eventual winners The Young Bucks in the quarter-final round. They next appeared at All Star Weekend 9, defeating AR Fox and Samuray del Sol on the first night. On the second night, Guns teamed with Fox against Kevin Steen and Unbreakable F'N Machines (Brian Cage and Michael Elgin) in a losing effort. At Ten, Guns unsuccessfully challenged Young Bucks for the PWG World Tag Team Championship in a three-way ladder match, also involving Dojo Bros. (Eddie Edwards and Roderick Strong).

On January 31, 2014, Guns participated in that year's DDT4 tournament, defeating The African American Wolves (ACH and AR Fox) in the quarter-final and Unbreakable F'N Machines in the semi-final but lost to Best Friends (Chuck Taylor and Trent?) in the final. On the first night of Battle of Los Angeles, Guns received a World Tag Team Championship opportunity against The World's Cutest Tag Team (Candice LeRae and Joey Ryan) in a three-way match, also involving The Addiction (Christopher Daniels and Frankie Kazarian). Guns failed to win the titles. Ricochet and Swann participated in the namesake tournament on the second night. Swann was eliminated by LeRae while Ricochet advanced in the tournament by defeating Chris Sabin. On the third night, Ricochet defeated T.J. Perkins in the quarter-final, Kenny Omega in the semi-final, and Johnny Gargano and Roderick Strong in the three-way final to win the 2014 Battle of Los Angeles tournament.

On May 22, 2015, Guns participated in their third consecutive Dynamite Duumvirate Tag Team Title Tournament. They defeated Biff Busick and Drew Gulak in the quarter-final but lost to the eventual winners Andrew Everett and Trevor Lee in the semi-final. On the first night of Battle of Los Angeles, Guns lost to Los Güeros del Cielo (Angélico and Jack Evans). On the second night, both Swann and Ricochet participated in the Battle of Los Angeles tournament, but lost to Zack Sabre Jr. and Marty Scurll in their respective matches. On the third night, Guns teamed with Angélico and Fenix against Mount Rushmore 2.0 (Matt Jackson, Nick Jackson, Roderick Strong and Super Dragon) in a losing effort.

=== Westside Xtreme Wrestling (2014) ===
Inner City Machine Guns wrestled a few matches for the German promotion Westside Xtreme Wrestling in 2014. Their first wXw match took place at the first night of 16 Carat Gold Tournament, unsuccessfully challenging Hot And Spicy (Axel Dieter Jr. and Da Mack) for the wXw World Tag Team Championship. They next appeared at Fans Appreciation Night, where they teamed with CIMA to defeat Masato Yoshino and Hot And Spicy in a six-man tag team match.

=== Revolution Pro Wrestling (2014) ===
Inner City Machine Guns made their debut for the British promotion Revolution Pro Wrestling at High Stakes on March 15, 2014. They defeated The Swords of Essex (Paul Robinson and Will Ospreay) in their RevPro debut to win the British Tag Team Championship. The following day, at Sittingbourne Spectacular, Guns successfully defended the title against The Young Bucks, before losing the title to The Kartel (Sha Samuels and Terry Frazier).

== Championships and accomplishments ==
- Pro Wrestling Guerrilla
  - Battle of Los Angeles (2014) – Ricochet
- Revolution Pro Wrestling
  - British Tag Team Championship (1 time)
