= Dynamite Duumvirate Tag Team Title Tournament (2012) =

2012 professional wrestling tournament by PWG

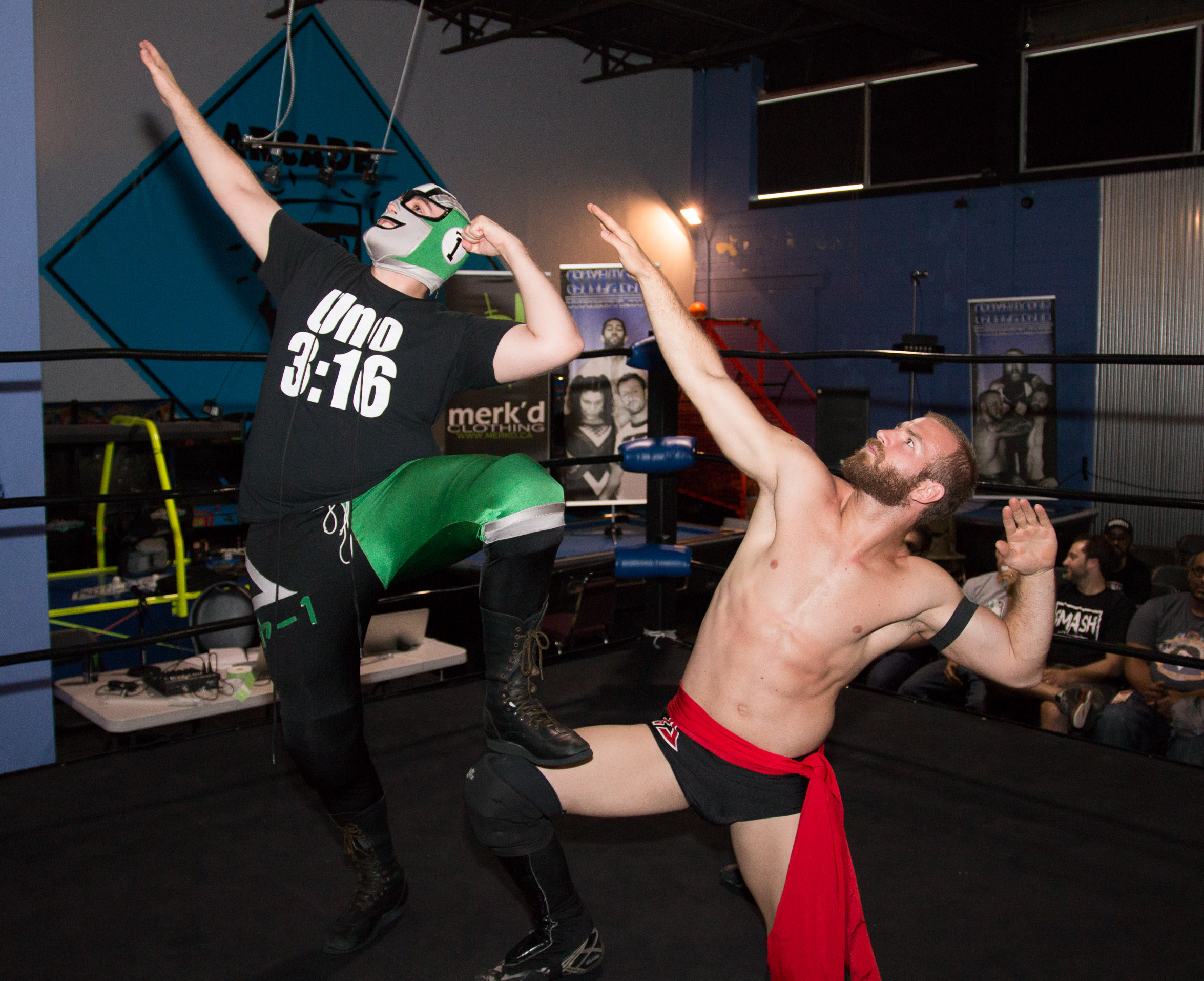
- The 2012 tournament winners Super Smash Brothers
- Promotion: Pro Wrestling Guerrilla
- Date: April 21, 2012
- City: Reseda, California
- Venue: American Legion Post #308

Event chronology
← Previous; World's Finest	Next → Death To All But Metal

Dynamite Duumvirate Tag Team Title Tournament chronology
← Previous; 2011	Next → 2013

Dynamite Duumvirate Tag Team Title Tournament (2012) was the sixth Dynamite Duumvirate Tag Team Title Tournament (DDT4) produced by Pro Wrestling Guerrilla (PWG). The event took place on April 21, 2012 at the American Legion Post #308 in Reseda, California.

It was an eight-team tournament to determine the #1 contenders for the PWG World Tag Team Championship. Super Smash Brothers (Player Uno and Stupefied) defeated 2 Husky Black Guys (El Generico and Willie Mack) in the final to win the tournament. The PWG World Championship was also defended at the event as Kevin Steen successfully defended the title against Sami Callihan.

== Production ==
=== Background ===
In February 2012, it was announced that the 2012 edition of DDT4 would be held on April 21, 2012 at the American Legion Post #308 in Reseda, California.

=== Storylines ===
The PWG World Tag Team Championship was originally scheduled to be defended in the 2012 DDT4 tournament. The original participants announced for the tournament were:

- World Tag Team Champions Appetite for Destruction (Kevin Steen and Super Dragon)
- The Dynasty (Joey Ryan and Scorpio Sky)
- Future Shock (Adam Cole and Kyle O'Reilly)
- The Fightin' Taylor Boys (Brian Cage-Taylor and Ryan Taylor)
- RockNES Monsters (Johnny Goodtime and Johnny Yuma)
- Roderick Strong and Sami Callihan
- Super Smash Brothers (Player Uno and Stupefied)
- The Young Bucks (Matt Jackson and Nick Jackson)

However, on April 4, it was announced that Dragon had fractured his heel and would be forced out of the tournament. The champions were replaced by 2 Husky Black Guys (El Generico and Willie Mack) in the tournament, which would instead be used to determine their number one contenders.

== Event ==
=== Quarterfinals ===
The quarterfinals of the DDT4 kicked off with a match between The RockNES Monsters (Johnny Goodtime and Johnny Yuma) and The Fightin' Taylor Boys (Brian Cage-Taylor and Ryan Taylor). RockNES Monsters delivered an Explosive Amnesia to Cage-Taylor for the win.

Next, The Dynasty (Joey Ryan and Scorpio Sky) took on Future Shock (Adam Cole and Kyle O'Reilly). Future Shock delivered a Ride the Lightning to Sky for the win.

Next, 2 Husky Black Guys (El Generico and Willie Mack) took on Roderick Strong and the debuting Sami Callihan. Generico delivered a Brainbustahhh!!! to Strong for the win. After the match, Callihan answered Kevin Steen's open challenge and challenged Steen to a match for the PWG World Championship later in the show.

It was followed by the last match in the quarterfinal between The Young Bucks (Matt Jackson and Nick Jackson) and Super Smash Brothers (Player Uno and Stupefied). Stupefied pinned a member of The Young Bucks with a crucifix for the win.

=== Semifinals ===
The semifinals of the DDT4 started with a match between RockNES Monsters and 2 Husky Black Guys. Willie Mack delivered a reverse piledriver to Johnny Yuma for the win.

In the next semifinal, Super Smash Brothers took on Future Shock. Super Smash Brothers delivered a Fatality (Gory Bomb by Uno and diving somersault cutter by Stupefied combination) to Kyle O'Reilly for the win.

After the match, Kevin Steen defended the PWG World Championship against Sami Callihan. Steen delivered a package piledriver to Callihan after the latter spit in Steen's face. Steen then pinned Callihan to retain the title.

=== Final ===
2 Husky Black Guys took on Super Smash Brothers in the DDT4 tournament final. Stupefied countered a Brainbustahhh!!! attempt by El Generico into a reverse hurricanrana and then Super Smash Brothers delivered a Fatality to Generico to win the 2012 DDT4. Young Bucks attacked Super Smash Brothers after the match and demanded a rematch against Appetite For Destruction. Kevin Steen then chased them off and offered to give them a rematch after Super Dragon healed from his injuries. Super Smash Brothers then celebrated their win.

== Reception ==
Jake St. Pierre of 411Mania praised the event, considering it a "tremendous" show. He rated it 9.5, appreciating it "for its consistency" and felt "Future Shock/SSB is worth price of admission alone". He stated that it was "the show to get" for tag team wrestling lovers.

== Aftermath ==
Due to Super Dragon's injury, the World Tag Team Championship match between Appetite For Destruction and The Young Bucks was postponed. And, instead Young Bucks were scheduled to take on Super Smash Brothers in a no disqualification match at Death To All But Metal. The match resulted due to Young Bucks being eliminated from DDT4 by Super Smash Brothers and not reaching for the DDT4 final for the first time since 2009. It was turned into a World Tag Team Championship match after the titles were vacated due to Dragon's injury. Super Smash Brothers went on to defeat Young Bucks to win the vacant titles.

== Results ==
No.	Results	Stipulations	Times
1	The RockNES Monsters (Johnny Goodtime and Johnny Yuma) defeated The Fightin' Taylor Boys (Brian Cage-Taylor and Ryan Taylor)	Tag team match in the quarter-final round of Dynamite Duumvirate Tag Team Title Tournament	13:10
2	Future Shock (Adam Cole and Kyle O'Reilly) defeated The Dynasty (Joey Ryan and Scorpio Sky)	Tag team match in the quarter-final round of Dynamite Duumvirate Tag Team Title Tournament	11:40
3	2 Husky Black Guys (El Generico and Willie Mack) defeated Roderick Strong and Sami Callihan	Tag team match in the quarter-final round of Dynamite Duumvirate Tag Team Title Tournament	17:07
4	Super Smash Brothers (Player Uno and Stupefied) defeated The Young Bucks (Matt Jackson and Nick Jackson)	Tag team match in the quarter-final round of Dynamite Duumvirate Tag Team Title Tournament	14:48
5	2 Husky Black Guys (El Generico and Willie Mack) defeated The RockNES Monsters (Johnny Goodtime and Johnny Yuma)	Tag team match in the semi-final round of Dynamite Duumvirate Tag Team Title Tournament	12:21
6	Super Smash Brothers (Player Uno and Stupefied) defeated Future Shock (Adam Cole and Kyle O'Reilly)	Tag team match in the semi-final round of Dynamite Duumvirate Tag Team Title Tournament	19:40
7	Kevin Steen (c) defeated Sami Callihan	Singles match for the PWG World Championship	13:12
8	Super Smash Brothers (Player Uno and Stupefied) defeated 2 Husky Black Guys (El Generico and Willie Mack)	Tag team match in the Dynamite Duumvirate Tag Team Title Tournament final	18:11
(c) / – the champion(s) heading into the match

=== Tournament brackets ===
First round
Strong/Callihan	Pin
2 Husky Black Guys
RockNES Monsters	Pin
Fightin' Taylor Boys
Future Shock	Pin
The Dynasty
Young Bucks	Pin
Super Smash Brothers

Semifinals
2 Husky Black Guys	Pin
RockNES Monsters
Future Shock	Pin
Super Smash Brothers

Final
2 Husky Black Guys	Pin
Super Smash Brothers
