= Super Smash =

Super Smash may refer to:

- Super Smash (men's cricket), the men's Twenty20 cricket competition in New Zealand
- Super Smash (women's cricket), the women's Twenty20 cricket competition in New Zealand
- Super Smash Bros., a video game series
  - Super Smash Bros. (video game)
- Super Smash Brothers (professional wrestling), a wrestling tag team of Player Uno and Stupefied
