= Dynamite Duumvirate Tag Team Title Tournament =

Annual independent wrestling tournament

- Promotions: Pro Wrestling Guerrilla
- First event: 2007
- Last event: 2015
- Event gimmick: Annual tag team single elimination tournament

The Dynamite Duumvirate Tag Team Title Tournament (DDT4) was an annual professional wrestling tag team tournament produced by Pro Wrestling Guerrilla (PWG) between 2007 and 2015. The inaugural tournament was contested for the vacant PWG World Tag Team Championship. Reigning champions entered the tournament and defended the title in each round of the tournament for five editions (2008, 2009, 2010, 2013 and 2015) while three editions (2011, 2012 and 2014) of the tournament were used to determine the number one contenders to the champions.

== History ==
The Dynamite Duumvirate Tag Team Title Tournament was originally conceived in 2007, when Cape Fear (El Generico and Quicksilver) were forced to vacate the PWG World Tag Team Championship after Quicksilver suffered a career-ending concussion during a title defense against Davey Richards and Roderick Strong. As a result, the DDT4 was announced as a tag team tournament to crown the new champions. The inaugural tournament took place on May 19, 2007 at the Burbank Armory in Burbank, California. Pac and Roderick Strong won the inaugural DDT4 by defeating The Briscoe Brothers (Jay and Mark) in the final for the vacant titles.

In 2008, DDT4 became a regular annual tag team tournament for PWG, just like the prestigious Battle of Los Angeles tournament for singles competition. The World Tag Team Championship was defended in the DDT4 from 2008 to 2010.

In 2011, a shift from the previous tradition took place as the reigning champions ¡Peligro Abejas! (El Generico and Paul London) were not entered into the tournament and the tournament was used to determine the #1 contenders for the World Tag Team Championship. The titles were again not defended in the 2012 tournament. The reason was that the reigning champions Appetite for Destruction (Kevin Steen and Super Dragon) had been originally scheduled to compete in the tournament, but Dragon suffered an injury, forcing both of them out of the tournament. Steen instead defended the PWG World Championship at the event.

In 2013, the World Tag Team Championship was defended in the tournament. However, during the 2014 edition, the reigning champions The Young Bucks (Matt Jackson and Nick Jackson) were not entered into the tournament, and DDT4 would become a #1 contender's tournament for the titles. In 2015, the titles were defended in the tournament and marked the first and only time that the title changed hands in all three rounds of DDT4. It would also be the final edition of DDT4 as the tournament was cancelled in 2016.

== Winners, dates, venues and main events ==
Year	Tournament winner	Times won	Date	Runner-up	City	Venue	Main event	Ref.
2007	Pac and Roderick Strong	1	May 19, 2007	The Briscoe Brothers (Jay and Mark)	Burbank, California	Burbank Armory	El Generico (c) vs. Kevin Steen for the PWG World Championship	
2007	Pac and Roderick Strong	1	May 20, 2007	The Briscoe Brothers (Jay and Mark)	Burbank, California	Burbank Armory	Pac and Roderick Strong vs. The Briscoe Brothers (Jay and Mark) in the 2007 Dynamite Duumvirate Tag Team Title Tournament final for the vacant PWG World Tag Team Championship	
2008	Jack Evans and Roderick Strong (2)	1	May 17, 2008	El Generico and Kevin Steen	Burbank, California	Burbank Armory	El Generico and Kevin Steen (c) vs. Davey Richards and Super Dragon in the quarter-final round of the 2008 Dynamite Duumvirate Tag Team Title Tournament for the PWG World Tag Team Championship	
2008	Jack Evans and Roderick Strong (2)	1	May 18, 2008	El Generico and Kevin Steen	Burbank, California	Burbank Armory	El Generico and Kevin Steen (c) vs. Jack Evans and Roderick Strong in the 2008 Dynamite Duumvirate Tag Team Title Tournament final for the PWG World Tag Team Championship	
2009	The Young Bucks (Matt Jackson and Nick Jackson)	1	May 22, 2009	Bryan Danielson and Roderick Strong	Reseda, California	American Legion Post #308	The Young Bucks (Matt Jackson and Nick Jackson) (c) vs. Bryan Danielson and Roderick Strong in the 2009 Dynamite Duumvirate Tag Team Title Tournament final for the PWG World Tag Team Championship	
2010	¡Peligro Abejas! (El Generico and Paul London)	1	May 9, 2010	The Young Bucks (Matt Jackson and Nick Jackson)	Reseda, California	American Legion Post #308	The Young Bucks (Matt Jackson and Nick Jackson) (c) vs. ¡Peligro Abejas! (El Generico and Paul London) in the 2010 Dynamite Duumvirate Tag Team Title Tournament final for the PWG World Tag Team Championship	
2011	The Young Bucks (Matt Jackson and Nick Jackson)	2	April 3, 2011	The Nightmare Violence Connection (Akira Tozawa and Kevin Steen)	Reseda, California	American Legion Post #308	The Nightmare Violence Connection (Akira Tozawa and Kevin Steen) vs. The Young Bucks (Matt Jackson and Nick Jackson) in the 2011 Dynamite Duumvirate Tag Team Title Tournament final	
2012	The Super Smash Brothers (Player Uno and Stupefied)	1	April 21, 2012	2 Husky Black Guys (El Generico and Willie Mack)	Reseda, California	American Legion Post #308	2 Husky Black Guys (El Generico and Willie Mack) vs. The Super Smash Brothers (Player Uno and Stupefied) in the 2012 Dynamite Duumvirate Tag Team Title Tournament final	
2013	The Young Bucks (Matt Jackson and Nick Jackson)	3	January 12, 2013	El Generico and Kevin Steen	Reseda, California	American Legion Post #308	The Young Bucks (Matt Jackson and Nick Jackson) (c) vs. El Generico and Kevin Steen in the 2013 Dynamite Duumvirate Tag Team Title Tournament final for the PWG World Tag Team Championship	
2014	Best Friends (Chuck Taylor and Trent)	1	January 31, 2014	The Inner City Machine Guns (Rich Swann and Ricochet)	Reseda, California	American Legion Post #308	Best Friends (Chuck Taylor and Trent) vs. The Inner City Machine Guns (Rich Swann and Ricochet) in the 2014 Dynamite Duumvirate Tag Team Title Tournament final	
2015	Andrew Everett and Trevor Lee	1	May 22, 2015	The Beaver Boys (Alex Reynolds and John Silver)	Reseda, California	American Legion Post #308	The Beaver Boys (Alex Reynolds and John Silver) (c) vs. Andrew Everett and Trevor Lee in the 2015 Dynamite Duumvirate Tag Team Title Tournament final for the PWG World Tag Team Championship	

=== Championship match for winner ===
– Championship victory
– Championship match loss

#	Winner	Event	Year	Championship match
1	The Young Bucks (Matt and Nick Jackson)	Card Subject To Change III	2011	Bucks defeated El Generico and Ricochet (substitute for Paul London) to win the PWG World Tag Team Championship.
2	The Super Smash Brothers (Player Uno and Stupefied)	Death To All But Metal	2012	Super Smash Brothers defeated The Young Bucks in a no disqualification match to win the vacant PWG World Tag Team Championship.
3	Best Friends (Chuck Taylor and Trent)	Mystery Vortex II	2014	Best Friends unsuccessfully challenged The Young Bucks for the PWG World Tag Team Championship.

The inaugural DDT4 tournament in 2007 was contested for the vacant PWG World Tag Team Championship while the titles were defended in the 2008, 2009, 2010, 2013 and 2015 editions of the tournament.
