= Dynamite Duumvirate Tag Team Title Tournament (2014) =

2014 professional wrestling tournament by PWG

- Promotion: Pro Wrestling Guerrilla
- Date: January 31, 2014
- City: Reseda, California
- Venue: American Legion Post #308

Event chronology
← Previous; All Star Weekend 10	Next → Mystery Vortex II

Dynamite Duumvirate Tag Team Title Tournament chronology
← Previous; 2013	Next → 2015

Dynamite Duumvirate Tag Team Title Tournament (2014) was the eighth Dynamite Duumvirate Tag Team Title Tournament (DDT4) produced by Pro Wrestling Guerrilla (PWG). The event took place on January 31, 2014 at the American Legion Post #308 in Reseda, California.

The tournament would be held to determine the #1 contenders for the PWG World Tag Team Championship. Best Friends (Chuck Taylor and Trent?) won the tournament by defeating The Inner City Machine Guns (Rich Swann and Ricochet) in the final. Aside from the tournament, Tommaso Ciampa defeated Adam Thornstowe, and Drake Younger defeated Chris Hero, Johnny Gargano and Kyle O'Reilly in a four-way match to become the #1 contender for the PWG World Championship.

== Production ==
=== Background ===
On December 23, 2013, PWG announced on its official Twitter account that the 2014 edition of DDT4 would take place at the American Legion Post #308 in Reseda, California.

=== Storylines ===
It was announced that unlike the previous edition, the PWG World Tag Team Championship would not be defended in the 2014 edition. Instead, the winning team would become the #1 contenders for the World Tag Team Championship. The participants announced for the DDT4 were:

- African-American Wolves (A. C. H. and A. R. Fox)
- Best Friends (Chuck Taylor and Trent?)
- Cole Steen Cole (Adam Cole and Kevin Steen)
- The Inner City Machine Guns (Rich Swann and Ricochet)
- PPRay (Peter Avalon and Ray Rosas)
- RockNES Monsters (Johnny Goodtime and Johnny Yuma)
- Unbreakable F'n Machines (Brian Cage and Michael Elgin)
- World's Cutest Tag Team (Candice LeRae and Joey Ryan)

Two non-tournament matches were also announced for DDT4. The first match set for the event was a four-way match between Chris Hero, Drake Younger, Johnny Gargano, and Kyle O'Reilly to determine the #1 contender for the PWG World Championship. The second match was a singles match between Roderick Strong and Tommaso Ciampa. However, Strong was unable to compete at DDT4 due to injury, and would be replaced by the debuting Adam Thornstowe as Ciampa's opponent.

== Event ==
=== Quarterfinals ===
The DDT4 kicked off with a match between Best Friends (Chuck Taylor and Trent?) and The RockNES Monsters (Johnny Goodtime and Johnny Yuma). Best Friends delivered a double chokeslam to Goodtime, with the aid of a trenchcoat, from the top rope for the win.

Next, Unbreakable F'N Machines (Brian Cage and Michael Elgin) took on PPRay (Peter Avalon and Ray Rosas). Cage knocked Rosas out of the ring after Rosas tried to deliver a superplex to Cage and then Cage and Elgin double teamed Avalon as Cage delivered a gorilla press slam into a backfist to Avalon. Elgin then delivered a neckbreaker to Avalon and followed it with an Elgin Bomb for the win.

Next, World's Cutest Tag Team (Candice LeRae and Joey Ryan) took on Cole Steen Cole (Adam Cole and Kevin Steen). Cole knocked LeRae out with a Panama Sunrise and Ryan proceeded to deliver That 70's Kick to Cole. Steen then delivered a pop-up powerbomb to Ryan, and Cole Steen Cole delivered a superkick/package piledriver combination to Ryan and then Cole delivered a superkick to Ryan for the win.

It was followed by the last match in the quarterfinals between The Inner City Machine Guns (Rich Swann and Ricochet) and African-American Wolves (A. C. H. and A. R. Fox). Swann delivered a handspring cutter to ACH and attempted to deliver a standing 450° splash but ACH avoided it. However, Ricochet managed to deliver a springboard 450° splash to ACH for the win.

After the match, Adam Thornstowe made his PWG debut against Tommaso Ciampa. Ciampa delivered a high knee to Thornstowe for the win.

=== Semifinals ===
The semifinal round of the DDT4 began with a match between Cole Steen Cole and Best Friends. Adam Cole knocked out Chuck Taylor by backdropping him on the chairs set up outside the ring. Kevin Steen then delivered a sleeper suplex to Trent? in the ring, and then Cole Steen Cole attempted to deliver a superkick and a package piledriver combination to Trent?. But Candice LeRae distracted Cole by spitting in his face, causing Cole to chase her in retaliation. Steen was distracted, and Trent? capitalized by pinning him with a jackknife for the win.

Next, Inner City Machine Guns took on Unbreakable F'N Machines. Cage countered a standing 450° splash by Swann into a gorilla press slam into a backfist. A miscommunication then occurred and Cage accidentally delivered a DDT to Elgin, allowing Swann to deliver a standing 450° splash to Elgin and Ricochet followed it with a 630° senton on Elgin. However, Cage caught Ricochet and attempted to deliver a Weapon X but Swann kicked Cage, allowing Ricochet to pin Cage with a sunset flip for the win.

Later, the penultimate match took place. It was a four-way match between Chris Hero, Drake Younger, Johnny Gargano, and Kyle O'Reilly to determine the #1 contender for the PWG World Championship. Gargano and Hero were knocked out, which led to Younger and O'Reilly exchanging moves with each other. It culminated with Younger delivering a Drake's Landing to O'Reilly for the win.

=== Final ===
In the DDT4 final, Best Friends took on Inner City Machine Guns. Chuck Taylor countered a handspring cutter attempt by Rich Swann into an Omega Driver for the win.

== Reception ==
DDT4 received mostly positive reviews from critics.

Will Pruett of Pro Wrestling Dot Net praised the event as "an excellent night of wrestling", "with the unexpected crowning of Best Friends as DDT4 winners." He further wrote "The tag team action was all sorts of fun. The setup for Younger vs. Cole and Young Bucks vs. Best Friends (both of which I assume will happen in March) was great. The long term story of LaRae and Cole was also delightful."

Jake St-Pierre of 411Mania rated the event with 8.0 score, with "great matches up and down the card". He considered it a "consistently fantastic offering" by PWG, praising all of the matches, with the exception of PPRay's match against Unbreakable F'n Machines, stating it "more inoffensive than anything."

== Aftermath ==
DDT4 would turn out to be Drake Younger's last appearance in PWG, as he signed with WWE in March and was unable to challenge Adam Cole for the PWG World Championship at Mystery Vortex II. Candice LeRae then substituted for Younger and answered Cole's open challenge for the title as a continuation of their feud following their confrontations at DDT4. Cole went on to retain the title.

Best Friends received a World Tag Team Championship opportunity against The Young Bucks as a result of winning DDT4, at Mystery Vortex II, but failed to win the titles.

== Results ==
No.	Results	Stipulations	Times
1	Best Friends (Chuck Taylor and Trent?) defeated The RockNES Monsters (Johnny Goodtime and Johnny Yuma)	Tag team match in the quarter-final round of Dynamite Duumvirate Tag Team Title Tournament	10:21
2	Unbreakable F'N Machines (Brian Cage and Michael Elgin) defeated PPRay (Peter Avalon and Ray Rosas)	Tag team match in the quarter-final round of Dynamite Duumvirate Tag Team Title Tournament	12:28
3	Cole Steen Cole (Adam Cole and Kevin Steen) defeated World's Cutest Tag Team (Candice LeRae and Joey Ryan)	Tag team match in the quarter-final round of Dynamite Duumvirate Tag Team Title Tournament	10:30
4	The Inner City Machine Guns (Rich Swann and Ricochet) defeated African-American Wolves (A. C. H. and A. R. Fox)	Tag team match in the quarter-final round of Dynamite Duumvirate Tag Team Title Tournament	22:40
5	Tommaso Ciampa defeated Adam Thornstowe	Singles match	11:31
6	Best Friends (Chuck Taylor and Trent?) defeated Cole Steen Cole (Adam Cole and Kevin Steen)	Tag team match in the semi-final round of Dynamite Duumvirate Tag Team Title Tournament	8:24
7	The Inner City Machine Guns (Rich Swann and Ricochet) defeated Unbreakable F'N Machines (Brian Cage and Michael Elgin)	Tag team match in the semi-final round of Dynamite Duumvirate Tag Team Title Tournament	18:55
8	Drake Younger defeated Chris Hero, Johnny Gargano and Kyle O'Reilly	Four-way match to determine the #1 contender for the PWG World Championship	28:08
9	Best Friends (Chuck Taylor and Trent?) defeated The Inner City Machine Guns (Rich Swann and Ricochet)	Tag team match in the Dynamite Duumvirate Tag Team Title Tournament final	8:13

=== Tournament brackets ===
First round
Best Friends	Pin
RockNES Monsters
Cole Steen Cole	Pin
World's Cutest Tag Team
Unbreakable F'N Machines	Pin
PPRay
Inner City Machine Guns	Pin
African-American Wolves

Semifinals
Best Friends	Pin
Cole Steen Cole
Unbreakable F'N Machines	Pin
Inner City Machine Guns

Final
Best Friends	Pin
Inner City Machine Guns
