= Dynamite Duumvirate Tag Team Title Tournament (2008) =

2008 professional wrestling tournament by PWG

- Promotion: Pro Wrestling Guerrilla
- Date: Night One: May 17, 2008; Night Two: May 18, 2008
- City: Burbank, California
- Venue: Burbank Armory
- Attendance: Combined: 650 or 730; Night One: 350; Night Two: 300 or 380

Event chronology
← Previous; It's A Gift... And A Curse	Next → It's It (What Is It?)

Dynamite Duumvirate Tag Team Title Tournament chronology
← Previous; 2007	Next → 2009

Dynamite Duumvirate Tag Team Title Tournament (2008) was the second Dynamite Duumvirate Tag Team Title Tournament (DDT4) produced by Pro Wrestling Guerrilla (PWG). It was a two-night event, taking place on May 17 and 18, 2008 at the Burbank Armory in Burbank, California.

The 2008 edition of DDT4 marked the first time that the PWG World Tag Team Championship was defended throughout the tournament. Jack Evans and Roderick Strong won the tournament and the titles by defeating the reigning and defending champions Kevin Steen and El Generico in the final.

== Production ==
=== Background ===
On January 17, 2008, it was announced that PWG would make Dynamite Duumvirate Tag Team Title Tournament, an annual event after the inaugural tournament took place the previous year. The 2008 edition of DDT4 was scheduled to take place at the Burbank Armory in Burbank, California on May 17 and May 18, 2008.

=== Storylines ===
==== Original line-up ====
On January 17, it was announced that a round robin tournament would take place between four teams with the winning team qualifying for DDT4. The four teams announced for the series were: Los Luchas (Phoenix Star and Zokre), The Young Bucks (Matt Jackson and Nick Jackson), Ronin and Scorpio Sky, and Hook Bomberry and TJ Perkins. The tournament concluded with a four corners survival match between the four teams at 1.21 Gigawatts. Los Luchas won to become the first team to qualify for DDT4. Ronin and Sky objected to Bomberry and Perkins' dirty tactics which caused their elimination, so they protested over it, leading to Dino Winwood scheduling the two teams to compete in a match at It's A Gift... And A Curse, for a spot in DDT4. Ronin and Sky defeated Bomberry and Perkins to qualify for the tournament.

At 1.21 Gigawatts, El Generico and Kevin Steen defeated The Dynasty (Joey Ryan and Scott Lost) to win the PWG World Tag Team Championship. As a result of winning the titles, Generico and Steen qualified for DDT4. Similarly, Dynasty was also added into the DDT4.

The next four teams added into the tournament were:

- Davey Richards and Super Dragon
- The Briscoe Brothers (Jay Briscoe and Mark Briscoe)
- Jack Evans and Roderick Strong
- Kota Ibushi and Kagetora

==== Replacement ====
Mark Briscoe suffered a wrist injury at Ring of Honor's Injustice event on April 12 and required a surgery that would keep him out of action. As a result, Briscoe Brothers were unable to compete in DDT4 and Jay Briscoe refused to team with a replacement partner. As a result, Dino Winwood added 2.0 (Jagged and Shane Matthews) as replacements of Briscoe Brothers.

Kota Ibushi suffered a broken ankle while competing in Japan and was forced to back out of the tournament. He was replaced by fellow Dramatic Dream Team wrestler El Blazer as KAGETORA's partner in DDT4.

==== Non-tournament matches ====
Following Mark Briscoe's injury, Jay Briscoe was scheduled to compete in singles competition against TJ Perkins on night one of DDT4. Similarly, Human Tornado was scheduled to defend the PWG World Championship against Austin Aries on night one. A match was scheduled between Aries and Briscoe on night two, which would become a World Championship match if Austin defeated Tornado on night one. A no disqualification match between Tornado and Necro Butcher was scheduled on night two. However, Tornado suffered an injury before the event and was unable to compete, which resulted in altering the card.

== Reception ==
TJ Hawke of 411Mania rated the night one 6.5, considering it "spotty" and criticizing most of the matches. The only praise was towards KAGETORA and El Blazer's performance.

He gave a score of 7 to the night two, considering it "a solid conclusion to the weekend". He felt that "Most of the matches delivered well enough, but there was definitely nothing memorable about this show (or the weekend in general)." However, he considered the 2008 DDT4 as "an improvement over the 2007 version."

== Results ==
Night 1 (May 17)
No.	Results	Stipulations	Times
1	Hook Bomberry defeated Nemesis	Singles match	—
2	Los Luchas (Phoenix Star and Zokre) defeated 2.0 (Jagged and Shane Matthews)	Tag team match in the quarter-final round of Dynamite Duumvirate Tag Team Title Tournament	11:46
3	TJ Perkins defeated Candice LeRae	Singles match	—
4	Jack Evans and Roderick Strong defeated Ronin and Scorpio Sky	Tag team match in the quarter-final round of Dynamite Duumvirate Tag Team Title Tournament	7:24
5	El Blazer and KAGETORA defeated The Dynasty (Joey Ryan and Scott Lost)	Tag team match in the quarter-final round of Dynamite Duumvirate Tag Team Title Tournament	12:50
6	Austin Aries defeated Jay Briscoe	Singles match	—
7	El Generico and Kevin Steen (c) defeated Davey Richards and Super Dragon	Tag team match for the PWG World Tag Team Championship in the quarter-final round of Dynamite Duumvirate Tag Team Title Tournament	15:40
(c) / – the champion(s) heading into the match

Night 2 (May 18)
No.	Results	Stipulations	Times
1	Jack Evans and Roderick Strong defeated Los Luchas (Phoenix Star and Zokre)	Tag team match in the semi-final round of Dynamite Duumvirate Tag Team Title Tournament	11:22
2	Davey Richards defeated Austin Aries	Singles match	—
3	El Generico and Kevin Steen (c) defeated El Blazer and KAGETORA	Tag team match for the PWG World Tag Team Championship in the semi-final round of Dynamite Duumvirate Tag Team Title Tournament	13:07
4	Necro Butcher defeated Jay Briscoe (with Human Tornado)	Singles match	—
5	Hook Bomberry, TJ Perkins and The Dynasty (Joey Ryan and Scott Lost) defeated Candice LeRae, Scorpio Sky and 2.0 (Jagged & Shane Matthews)	Eight-person tag team match	—
6	Jack Evans and Roderick Strong defeated El Generico and Kevin Steen (c)	Tag team match for the PWG World Tag Team Championship in the Dynamite Duumvirate Tag Team Title Tournament final	10:47
(c) / – the champion(s) heading into the match

=== Tournament brackets ===
First round
Los Luchas	Pin
2.0	11:46
Evans and Strong	Pin
Ronin and Sky	7:24
Blazer and Kagetora	Pin
The Dynasty	12:50
Generico and Steen (c)	Pin
Richards and Dragon	15:20

Semifinals
Los Luchas	Pin
Evans and Strong	11:22
Blazer and Kagetora	Pin
Generico and Steen (c)	13:07

Final
Evans and Strong	Pin
Generico and Steen (c)	10:47
