= Dynamite Duumvirate Tag Team Title Tournament (2009) =

2009 professional wrestling tournament by PWG

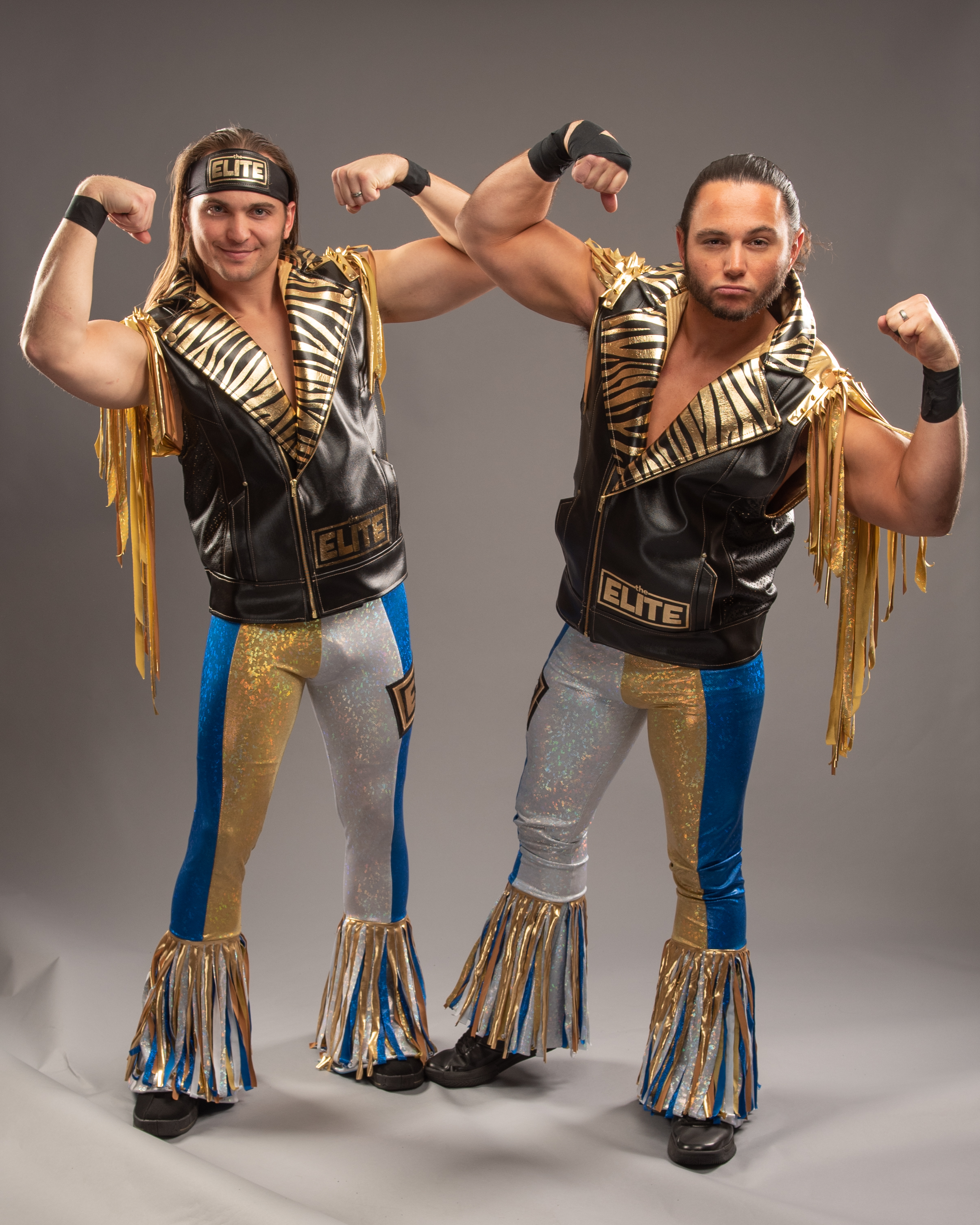
- The 2009 tournament winners The Young Bucks
- Promotion: Pro Wrestling Guerrilla
- Date: May 22, 2009
- City: Reseda, California
- Venue: American Legion Post #308
- Attendance: 425

Event chronology
← Previous; It's A Gift... And A Curse	Next → It's It (What Is It?)

Dynamite Duumvirate Tag Team Title Tournament chronology
← Previous; 2008	Next → 2010

Dynamite Duumvirate Tag Team Title Tournament (2009) was the third Dynamite Duumvirate Tag Team Title Tournament (DDT4) produced by Pro Wrestling Guerrilla (PWG). The event took place on May 22, 2009 at the American Legion Post #308 in Reseda, California.

The PWG World Tag Team Championship was defended throughout the DDT4 tournament. The reigning and defending champions The Young Bucks (Matt Jackson and Nick Jackson) defeated Hybrid Dolphins (Bryan Danielson and Roderick Strong) in the final to retain the titles and win the tournament. In the non-tournament matches, Young Bucks' brother Malachi Jackson made his PWG debut by losing to Phoenix Star, and Chris Hero retained the PWG World Championship against Joey Ryan.

== Production ==
=== Background ===
In April, PWG announced that the 2009 edition of DDT4 would take place on May 22, 2009 at the American Legion Post #308 in Reseda, California. It was the first edition of DDT4 to be held on one night, in contrast to the previous two editions that took place across two nights.

=== Storylines ===
==== Original line-up ====
On April 30, the first match for DDT4 was announced between Los Luchas (Phoenix Star and Zokre) and the newly formed team Men of Low Moral Fiber (Chuck Taylor and Kenny Omega). The match stemmed from the fact that Men of Low Moral Fiber wished to destroy El Generico and his orphanage Los Angelitos de El Generico, and Generico was unable to compete, so Los Luchas decided to win DDT4 and donate the reward money to the orphanage.

Six other teams announced for the tournament were:

- Chris Hero and Roderick Strong
- The Cutler Brothers (Brandon Cutler and Dustin Cutler)
- The Dynasty (Joey Ryan and Scott Lost)
- Hybrid Dolphins (Bryan Danielson and Paul London)
- Motor City Machine Guns (Alex Shelley and Chris Sabin)
- The Young Bucks (Matt Jackson and Nick Jackson)

It was announced that Young Bucks would defend the PWG World Tag Team Championship in DDT4. However, if Young Bucks lost the titles in their scheduled title defense against KAMIKAZE members Akira Tozawa and Shingo Takagi during Dragon Gate's Aggressive Gate tour on May 3, DDT4 would become a #1 contender's tournament, with the winning team receiving a future World Tag Team Championship opportunity. Young Bucks retained the titles against KAMIKAZE, therefore remaining the champions and entering DDT4 as defending champions.

==== Non-tournament matches ====
A match was announced between B-Boy and Human Tornado for the event. At Card Subject To Change event in 2005, B-Boy defeated Tornado and injured his shoulder in the process. The two would then compete against each other four years later at One Hundred as participants in opposing teams in a six-man tag team match. Tornado's team won. Tornado continued the rivalry by frequently insulting B-Boy on social media. B-Boy opted to respond to Tornado's insults by deciding to compete against him in the ring at DDT4.

== Event ==
=== Quarterfinals ===
The event began with PWG's Commissioner of Food and Beverage Excalibur and Paul London in the ring. London informed that he had suffered an injury and was unable to compete and then announced that Roderick Strong would replace him as Bryan Danielson's tag team partner in Hybrid Dolphins for DDT4. As a result, Strong's originally scheduled tag team partner Chris Hero withdrew from the tournament and issued an open challenge for the PWG World Championship at the event. Los Luchas (Phoenix Star and Zokre) would also withdraw from DDT4 due to Zokre's injury. Human Tornado reunited his Dark and Lovely tag team with Scorpio Sky and the two would be announced as Los Luchas' replacements in the tournament, thus cancelling Tornado's originally scheduled match against B-Boy at DDT4. These tournament changes led to Motor City Machine Guns (Alex Shelley and Chris Sabin) receiving a bye in the opening round.

London then called out a girl from the audience to celebrate Bryan Danielson's birthday but The Dynasty (Joey Ryan and Scott Lost) attacked Hybrid Dolphins, leading to their opening round match in DDT4. Strong countered a spin kick by Lost and delivered a Death By Roderick to Lost. Strong followed it by applying a Stronghold on Lost. Danielson aided Strong by applying a Cattle Mutilation on Lost at the same time, thus forcing Lost to submit to the hold.

Next, Dark and Lovely took on Men of Low Moral Fiber (Chuck Taylor and Kenny Omega). After delivering a German suplex to Scorpio Sky through the chairs, Omega delivered a Croyt's Wrath to Tornado and Taylor followed it by delivering an Awful Waffle to Tornado for the win.

In the next tournament match, The Young Bucks (Matt Jackson and Nick Jackson) defended the PWG World Tag Team Championship against The Cutler Brothers (Brandon Cutler and Dustin Cutler). After hitting Dustin with a knee, Matt delivered a Worst Case Scenario to Dustin to retain the titles.

After the match, Matt introduced his brother Malachi Jackson to PWG, who wrestled his first match against Phoenix Star. Star performed a spinebuster and an olympic slam on Jackson for the win.

=== Semifinals ===
The semifinal round of the DDT4 began with Young Bucks defending the World Tag Team Championship against Men of Low Moral Fiber. Bucks avoided a 450° splash by Omega and delivered a More Bang For Your Buck to Omega to retain the titles.

Next, Hybrid Dolphins took on Motor City Machine Guns. Danielson delivered a hurricanrana to Chris Sabin from the top rope and applied a triangle choke on Sabin to make him submit for the hold.

After the match, Joey Ryan answered Chris Hero's open challenge for the PWG World Championship to prevent him from breaking Ryan's record for the longest World Championship reign. Hero delivered a rolling elbow to Ryan to retain the title. Both men shook hands after the match but Ryan quickly hit Hero with the title belt.

=== Final ===
In the DDT4 final, Young Bucks defended the World Tag Team Championship against Hybrid Dolphins. Young Bucks delivered a series of superkicks to Danielson and followed it with a More Bang For Your Buck to retain the titles and win the tournament.

== Reception ==
DDT4 was very well-received by critics. Ryan Rozanski rated the event 9, considering it "one of the best shows" and probably "the most consistently great tournament". He felt that all the tournament matches were "highly enjoyable with the Semi-Final and Final matches being something to go out of your way to see". Furthermore, he felt that "The two non-tournament matches are nothing special, but they don't detract from the show as one is a harmless sprint and the other is a decent title defense."

TJ Hawke also rated the event 9, stating that DDT4 "wasn't perfect, but every single tournament match was at least good." He specifically praised the tournament finalists, stating that "The Hybrid Dolphins worked perfectly as the makeshift team that makes a surprising run in the tournament, and The Young Bucks solidified themselves as one of the best teams in the world."

== Aftermath ==
Joey Ryan's attack on Chris Hero at DDT4 led to the two feuding with each other. Ryan demanded a World Championship rematch against Hero at The Secret of Guerrilla Island, but Hero was unable to compete due to his commitments in Japan, but promised to award Ryan another title shot if he could beat Necro Butcher at the event. Ryan agreed and a no disqualification match between Butcher and Ryan was made official for The Secret of Guerrilla Island, which Ryan won. Hero would then defend the title against Ryan again in a Guerrilla Warfare at Threemendous II - Sixth Anniversary Event.

Cutler Brothers protested on the referee's officiating during their DDT4 loss against Young Bucks and demanded PWG management to ensure that the referees officiated the matches properly. Matt Jackson was injured, so Malachi Jackson decided to replace him and team with Nick Jackson against Cutler Brothers. Nick refused to team with Malachi stating that he needed a lot of experience to team with Young Bucks, so Jerome Robinson would become Malachi's partner against Cutler Brothers at The Secret of Guerrilla Island.

== Results ==
No.	Results	Stipulations	Times
1	Hybrid Dolphins (Bryan Danielson and Roderick Strong) (with Paul London) defeated The Dynasty (Joey Ryan and Scott Lost)	Tag team match in the quarter-final round of Dynamite Duumvirate Tag Team Title Tournament	10:18
2	Men of Low Moral Fiber (Chuck Taylor and Kenny Omega) defeated Dark and Lovely (Human Tornado and Scorpio Sky)	Tag team match in the quarter-final round of Dynamite Duumvirate Tag Team Title Tournament	16:21
3	The Young Bucks (Matt Jackson and Nick Jackson) (c) defeated The Cutler Brothers (Brandon Cutler and Dustin Cutler)	Tag team match for the PWG World Tag Team Championship in the quarter-final round of Dynamite Duumvirate Tag Team Title Tournament	10:08
4	Phoenix Star defeated Malachi Jackson	Singles match	5:52
5	The Young Bucks (Matt Jackson and Nick Jackson) (c) defeated Men of Low Moral Fiber (Chuck Taylor and Kenny Omega)	Tag team match for the PWG World Tag Team Championship in the semi-final round of Dynamite Duumvirate Tag Team Title Tournament	14:14
6	Hybrid Dolphins (Bryan Danielson and Roderick Strong) defeated Motor City Machine Guns (Alex Shelley and Chris Sabin)	Tag team match in the semi-final round of Dynamite Duumvirate Tag Team Title Tournament	22:34
7	Chris Hero (c) (with Candice LeRae) defeated Joey Ryan	Singles match for the PWG World Championship	22:01
8	The Young Bucks (Matt Jackson and Nick Jackson) (c) defeated Hybrid Dolphins (Bryan Danielson and Roderick Strong)	Tag team match for the PWG World Tag Team Championship in the Dynamite Duumvirate Tag Team Title Tournament final	19:53
(c) / – the champion(s) heading into the match

=== Tournament brackets ===
First round
Hybrid Dolphins	Sub
The Dynasty	9:53
Motor City Machine Guns	Bye
Men of Low Moral Fiber	Pin
Dark and Lovely	15:40
Young Bucks	Pin
Cutler Brothers	10:03

Semifinals
Hybrid Dolphins	Sub
Motor City Machine Guns	22:34
Men of Low Moral Fiber	Pin
Young Bucks	14:13

Final
Hybrid Dolphins	Pin
Young Bucks	19:57
