= Super Smash Brothers (professional wrestling) =

Professional wrestling tag team

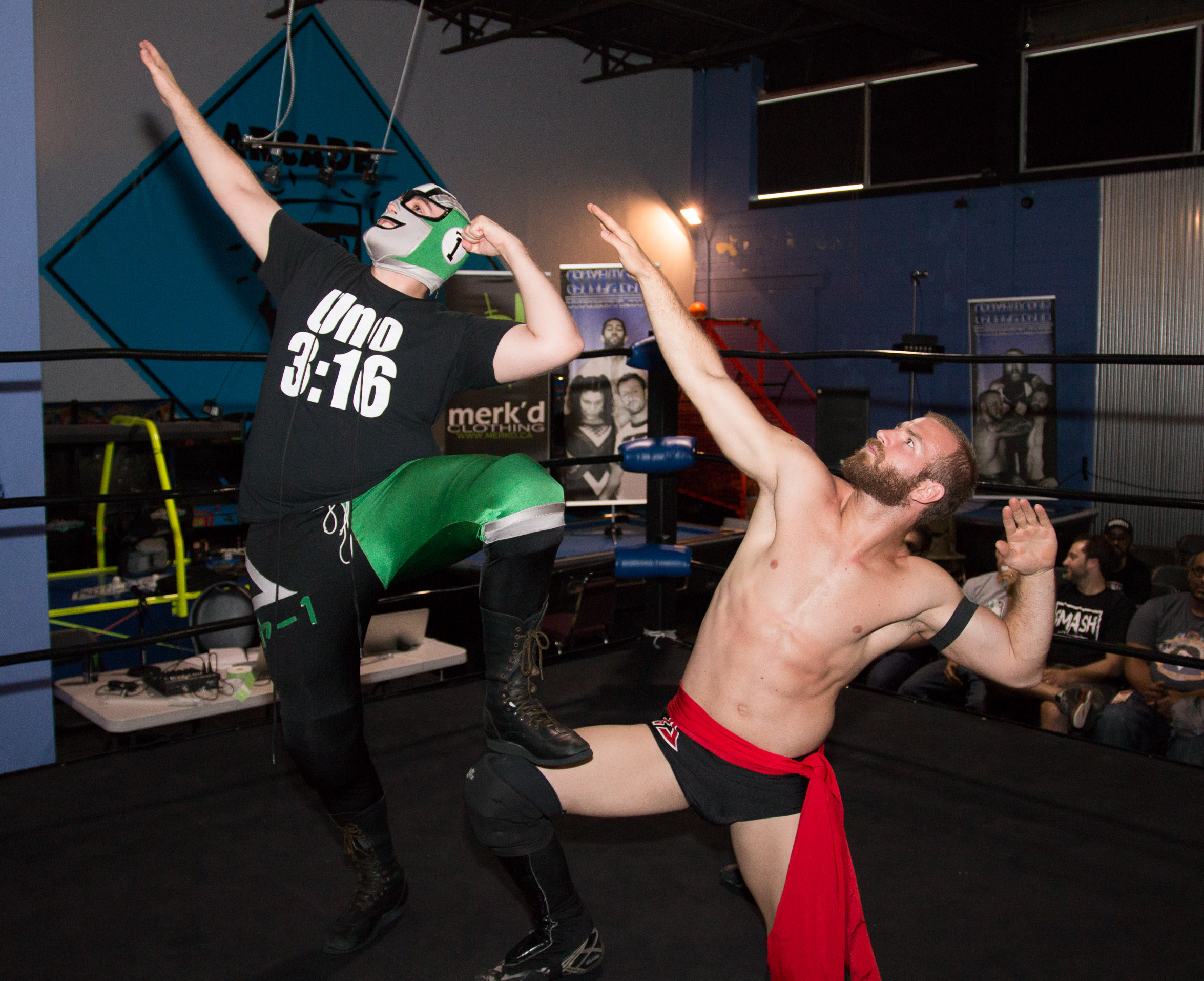
- Evil Uno (left) and Stu Grayson (right) in 2014

Tag team
- Members: Evil Uno/Player Uno; Stu Grayson/Stupefied/Player Dos
- Name(s): Evil Uno and Stu Grayson; Super Smash Brothers; Triforce
- Billed heights: Uno: 6 ft 0 in (1.83 m); Grayson: 5 ft 10 in (1.78 m)
- Combined billed weight: 439 lb (199 kg)
- Hometown: Gatineau, Quebec, Canada
- Billed from: The Keep
- Debut: June 10, 2006
- Years active: 2006–present

Evil Uno and Stu Grayson (previously known as Super Smash Brothers) are a Canadian professional wrestling tag team. They are the founding members of The Dark Order stable. Prior to AEW, Uno as Player Uno and Grayson as Stupefied and Player Dos wrestled across the independent circuit. They first joined forces as a tag team in International Wrestling Syndicate (IWS), and are former one-time Pro Wrestling Guerrilla (PWG) World Tag Team Champions.

== Professional wrestling career ==
=== Chikara (2007–2010) ===
In 2007, Player Uno and Stupefied, later competing as Player Dos, made their debut in Chikara as Super Smash Brothers. On September 21, 2008, at Laying in the Gutter, Looking at the Stars, they defeated Incoherence (Delirious and Hallowicked) to win the Chikara Campeonatos de Parejas before losing it a month later to The Osirian Portal (Amasis and Ophidian). Their last match in Chikara was on October 24, 2010, in a losing effort against Bruderschaft des Kreuzes (Daizee Haze and Sara Del Rey).

=== Ring of Honor (2009–2010, 2018) ===
On April 17, 2009, Super Smash Brothers made their Ring of Honor (ROH) debut in a dark match. On May 8, 2009, at Never Say Die, they made their official ROH in-ring debut, losing to Kenny King and Rhett Titus. On July 25, 2009, at Death Before Dishonor VII: Night Two in Toronto, Ontario, Canada, they defeated El Generico and Kevin Steen. On May 11, 2018, at War of the Worlds in Toronto, Ontario, Canada, Evil Uno and Stu Grayson wrestled their long-time rivals The Young Bucks (Matt Jackson and Nick Jackson) in a losing effort. They would later challenge for the ROH World Tag Team Championship on November 11, 2018, at Global Wars: Toronto, where they lost to SoCal Uncensored (Frankie Kazarian and Scorpio Sky).

=== Pro Wrestling Guerrilla (2011–2013, 2019) ===
On September 10, 2011, Super Smash Brothers made their Pro Wrestling Guerilla (PWG) debut at The Perils Of Rock N' Roll Decadence, losing to The RockNES Monsters (Johnny Goodtime and Johnny Yuma). On April 21, 2012, they won the 2012 Dynamite Duumvirate Tag Team Title Tournament (DDT4). They defeated The Young Bucks in the first round, Future Shock (Adam Cole and Kyle O'Reilly) in the semifinals, and 2 Husky Black Guys (El Generico and Willie Mack) in the final. On May 25, 2012, at Death To All But Metal, they defeated The Young Bucks in a No Disqualification match to win the vacant PWG World Tag Team Championship. Their first successful title defense was on July 21, 2012, at Threemendous III, was a three-way ladder match against Future Shock and The Young Bucks, and it was deemed SoCalUncensored.com's 2012 Match of the Year. Their second successful title defense was on December 1, 2012, at Mystery Vortex against The RockNES Monsters. On January 12, 2013, at the 2013 DDT4, they lost the tag titles to Unbreakable F'n Machines (Brian Cage and Michael Elgin). At Pro Wrestling Guerilla's Sixteen, on July 26, 2019, they returned to PWG as The Dark Order. This marked their first appearance in the company since 2013, when they were known as Super Smash Brothers. They defeated Best Friends (Chuck Taylor and Trent) by disqualification, when Trent hit a low blow in retaliation for the Dark Order doing the same when the referee was down.

=== All Elite Wrestling (2019–2022) ===
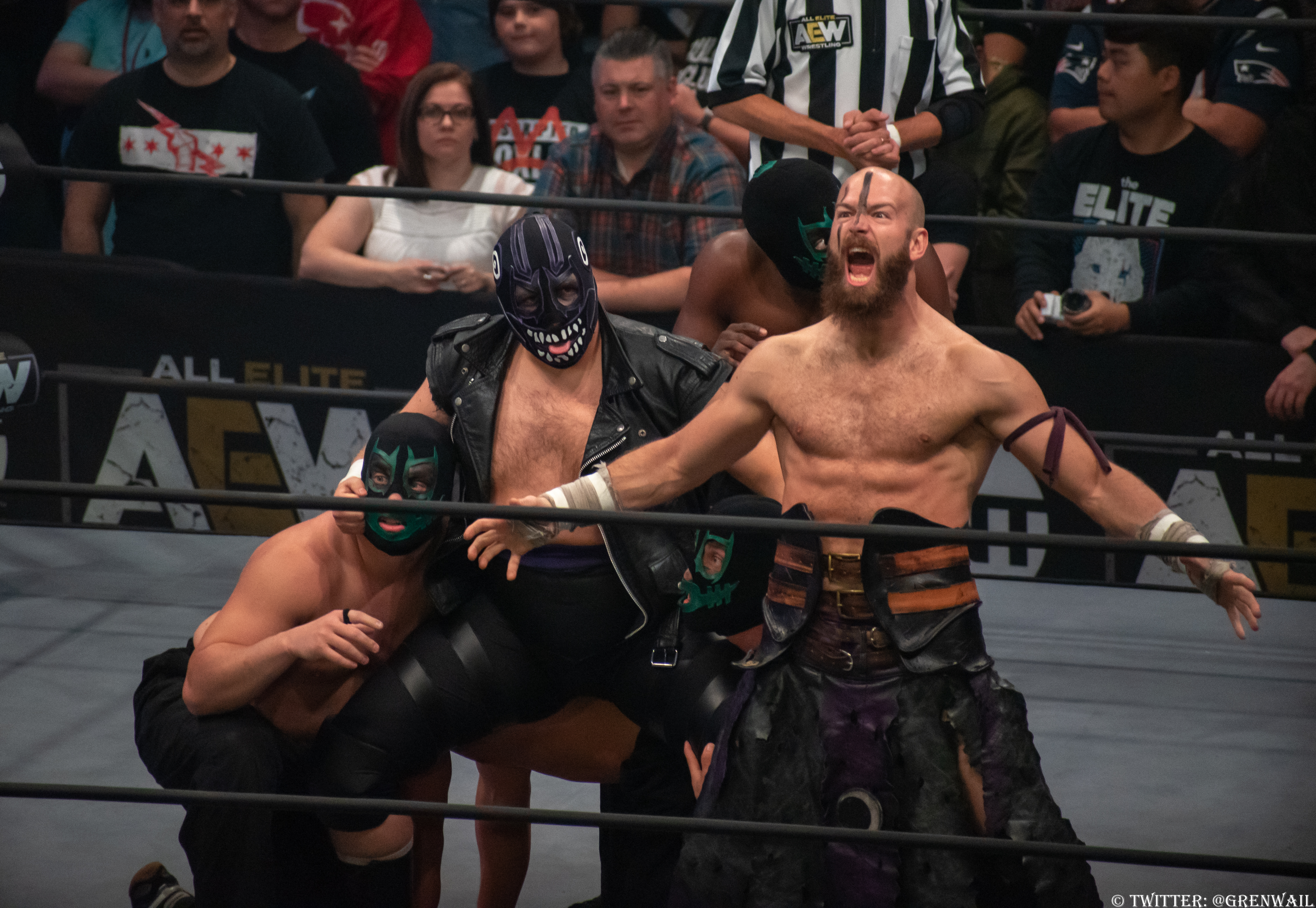
Uno and Greyson as the Dark Order in AEW in October 2019

On May 25, 2019, at Double or Nothing, Uno and Grayson made their All Elite Wrestling debut as The Dark Order. They would begin recruiting members with Alex Reynolds and John Silver joining the stable on the December 18, 2019 episode of AEW Dynamite. In the following months, Uno would tease the arrival of their leader and on the March 18, 2020 episode of Dynamite, Brodie Lee was revealed as The Exalted One. In May 2022, Grayson left the promotion.

== Championships and accomplishments ==
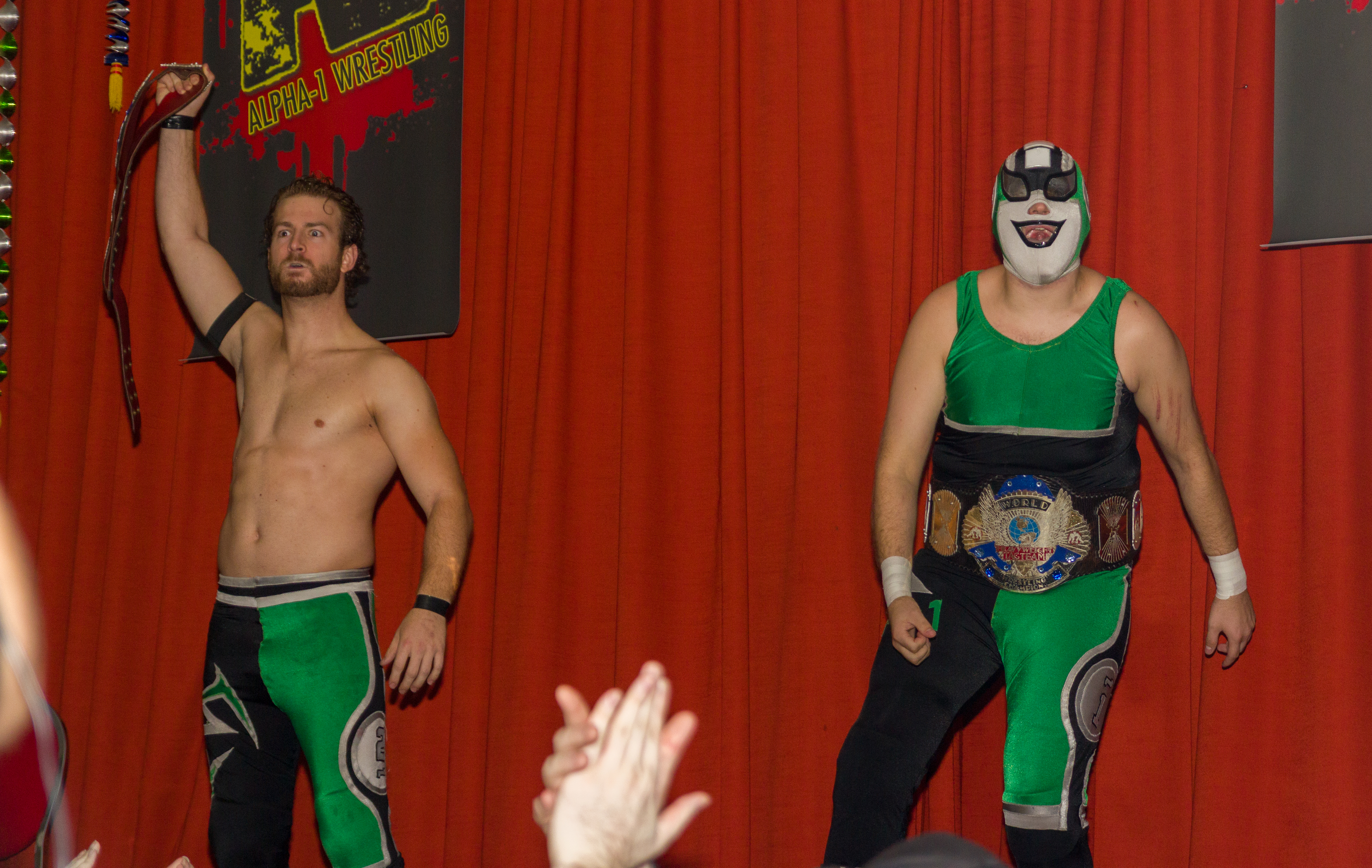
Stupefied (left) and Player Uno (right) as Super Smash Brothers with the Alpha-1 Tag championship belts in 2011

- Alpha-1 Wrestling
  - A1 Tag Team Championship (2 times)
- Chikara
  - Campeonatos de Parejas (1 time)
- Combat Revolution Wrestling
  - Interim CRW Tag Team Championship (1 time)
- International Wrestling Syndicate
  - IWS Tag Team Championship (1 time)
- Lucha Toronto
  - Royal Canadian Tag Team Championship (2 times)
- North Shore Pro Wrestling
  - NSPW Tag Team Championship (2 times)
- Pro Wrestling Guerrilla
  - PWG World Tag Team Championship (1 time)
  - Dynamite Duumvirate Tag Team Title Tournament (2012)
- Smash Wrestling
  - F8tful Eight Tournament (2018)
- SoCalUncensored.com
  - Match of the Year (2012) vs. Future Shock (Adam Cole and Kyle O'Reilly) and The Young Bucks (Matt Jackson and Nick Jackson) on July 21
  - Tag Team of the Year (2012)
- Squared Circle Wrestling
  - 2CW Tag Team Championship (1 time)
- Federation de Lutte Québécois
  - FLQ Heavyweight Championship (2 times, current) - Grayson
