= Brandon Cutler =

American professional wrestler (born 1987)

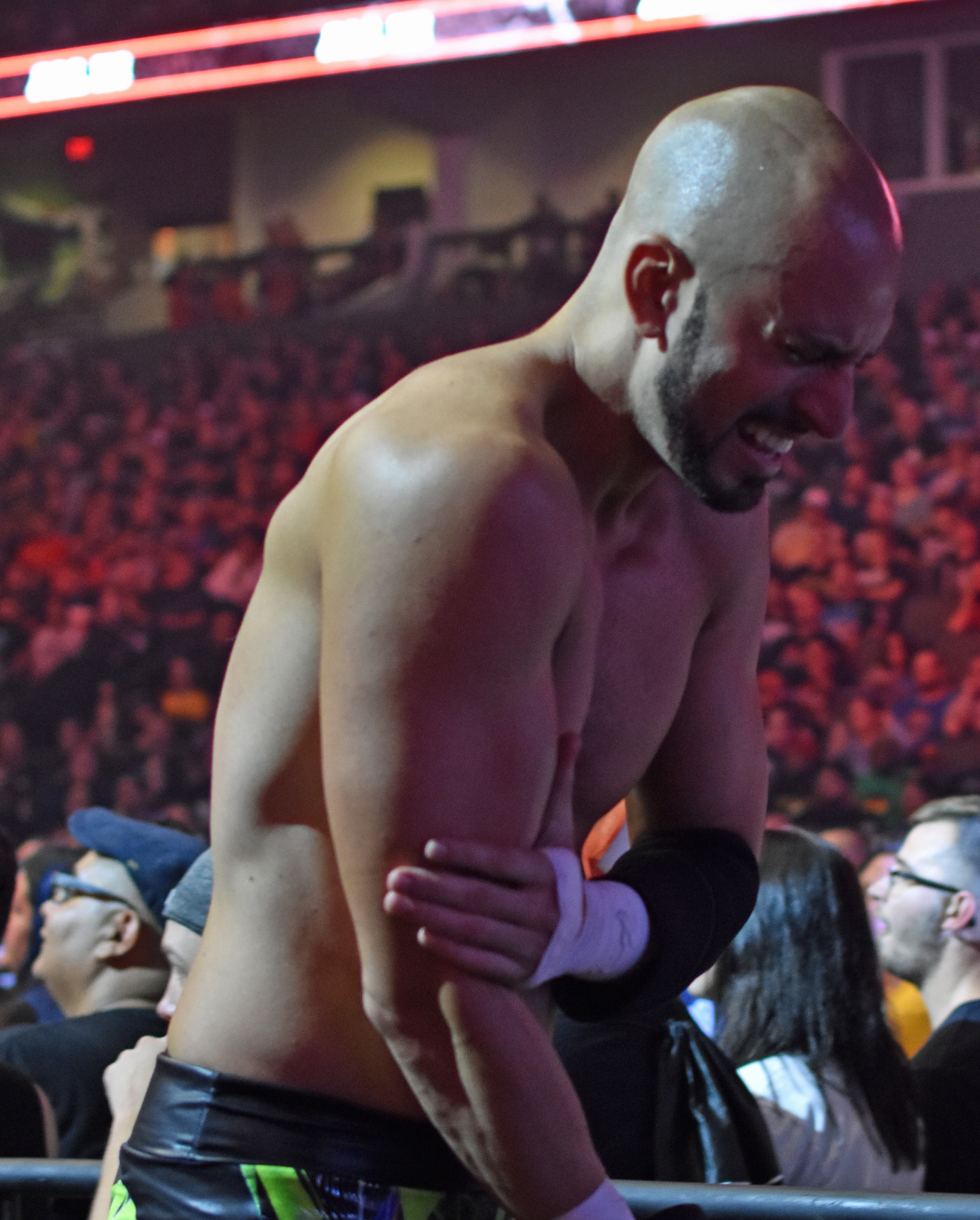
- Cutler at All In (2018)

Personal information
- Born: Brandon Bogle; June 18, 1987 (age 39) California, U.S.
- Website: Twitter

Professional wrestling career
- Ring name(s): Brandon Cutler; Ronnie Tsunami
- Billed height: 6 ft 2 in (1.88 m)
- Billed weight: 169 lb (77 kg)
- Trained by: Matt Jackson; Nick Jackson
- Debut: August 1, 2005

Brandon Bogle (born June 18, 1987), better known as Brandon Cutler, is an American professional wrestler. He is an executive producer of content of All Elite Wrestling (AEW) where he is also signed as a wrestler. He also performs in AEW's sister promotion Ring of Honor (ROH).

== Professional wrestling career ==
=== Early years (2005–2011) ===
Cutler was trained by The Young Bucks (Matt and Nick Jackson) and debuted in their Victorville, California-based promotion High Risk Wrestling by the ring name Ronnie Tsunami. He spent most of his early career wrestling in the California-based promotions including Empire Wrestling Federation, Alternative Wrestling Show, SoCal Pro Wrestling, Mach One Pro Wrestling, Vendetta Pro Wrestling, Battleground Pro Wrestling, Pro Wrestling LIVE and Pro Wrestling Guerrilla. He also made a debut in the Ring Of Honor (ROH). After 2011, Cutler disappeared from the ring for the next seven years.

=== Return to professional wrestling (2018–present) ===
Bogle returned in 2018 on January 21 debuting in Alpha Omega Wrestling (AOW) under the ring name Brandon Cutler. During Alpha Omega Wrestling's Unleashed VII, he competed in a three-way match against Funny Bone and Steven Andrews for the AOW Dragon Class Championship. He resumed his wrestling in the California promotions including Maverick Pro Wrestling, Bar Wrestling, LA Lucha, Alternative Wrestling Show and Championship Wrestling From Hollywood. On September 1, 2018, Brandon participated in the Over Budget Battle Royal at All In but was unsuccessful.

=== All Elite Wrestling (2019–present) ===
In a Being the Elite episode, Cutler's trainers Matt and Nick Jackson offered him contract with All Elite Wrestling, which he signed. Cutler debuted on AEW's inaugural event Double or Nothing where he was a participant of the 21-man Battle Royale. He eliminated Billy Gunn but was eliminated by MJF. Cutler returned on the first episode of AEW Dynamite where he lost his singles debut against MJF by submission. On the October 23 edition of AEW Dark, Cutler returned to the ring where he lost another match against Joey Janela. Following this, he went on a losing streak. Following, he went on a losing streak between October 2019 and November 2020 on Dark, both in single and tag team matches.

On the May 26, 2020, edition of Dark, Cutler began a storyline with Peter Avalon in a "race to the bottom", trying to get their first wins in AEW. The next week, Avalon and Cutler would compete in tag team action, losing to teams such as the Natural Nightmares (Dustin Rhodes and Q. T. Marshall), Jurassic Express (Marko Stunt and Luchasaurus), SoCal Uncensored (Christopher Daniels and Frankie Kazarian), and the Young Bucks. They were a dysfunctional tag team until they shook hands with each other as a sign of respect after losing to the Young Bucks. They made a team called the Initiative. However, the Initiative lost all of their matches and couldn't win a single match, leading Avalon to attack Cutler. Shortly after, they resumed their feud against each other with both men fighting to achieve their first victory in AEW. On the September 15, 2020, edition of AEW Dark, Avalon and Cutler had their first match against each other which ended in a double count out, leaving both men still winless. Avalon would face Cutler again on the October 13, 2020, episode of Dark and this time the match ended in a double disqualification, again leaving both competitors without a single victory. On the October 19, 2020, episode of Being the Elite (where much of Avalon and Cutler's feud has played out) AEW President Tony Khan announced Avalon vs. Cutler III for the October 27, 2020, edition of Dark and stipulated that there must be a winner. On the October 27, 2020, episode of Dark, Cutler defeated Avalon and broke his losing streak. After breaking the losing streak, Cutler went on a winning streak. His eight match winning streak came to an end when he lost to Luchasaurus in the January 19, 2021, edition of Dark. Cutler earned his first AEW title shot for the FTW Championship against Brian Cage in a losing effort in the March 11, 2021, edition of Dark. He also appeared twice in Dynamite matches in early 2021, both in a losing effort against Jake Hager and a trios match against Lucha Brothers and Laredo Kid.

Following the Young Bucks' heel turn, Cutler now acts as associate stooge as a member of the Elite often interfering in matches to aid the faction to win the match. Upon doing so, he also changed his attire to a tracksuit in the ring.

== Championships and accomplishments ==
- Alternative Wrestling Show
  - AWS Tag Team Championship (1 time) – with Dustin Cutler
- Insane Wrestling League
  - IWL Tag Team Championship (1 time) – with Dustin Cutler
- Other titles
  - Jewish Tag Team Championship (1 time) – with Colt Cabana
