= Doomsday device (wrestling) =

Professional wrestling move

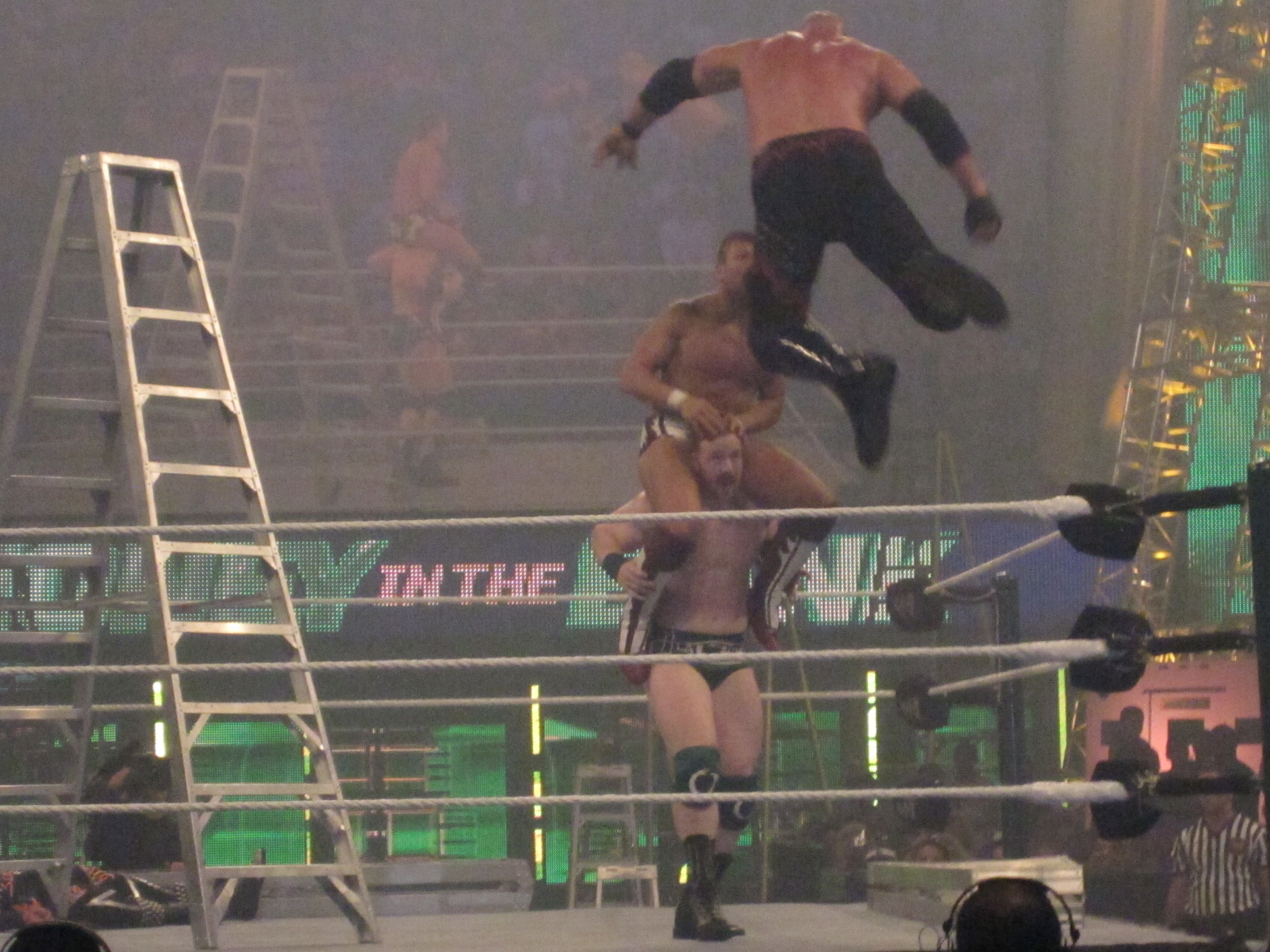
Sheamus holds Daniel Bryan in position to receive a doomsday clothesline from Kane.

Doomsday device is a term used in professional wrestling to reference a tandem move in which one wrestler hoists the opponent on their shoulders so that they are facing in the same direction in what is known as the electric chair position, while another wrestler climbs the ring post to the top turnbuckle and delivers a flying attack on the opponent.

The move was introduced by the tag team The Road Warriors, who were sometimes also known as the Legion of Doom throughout their careers.

== Variations ==
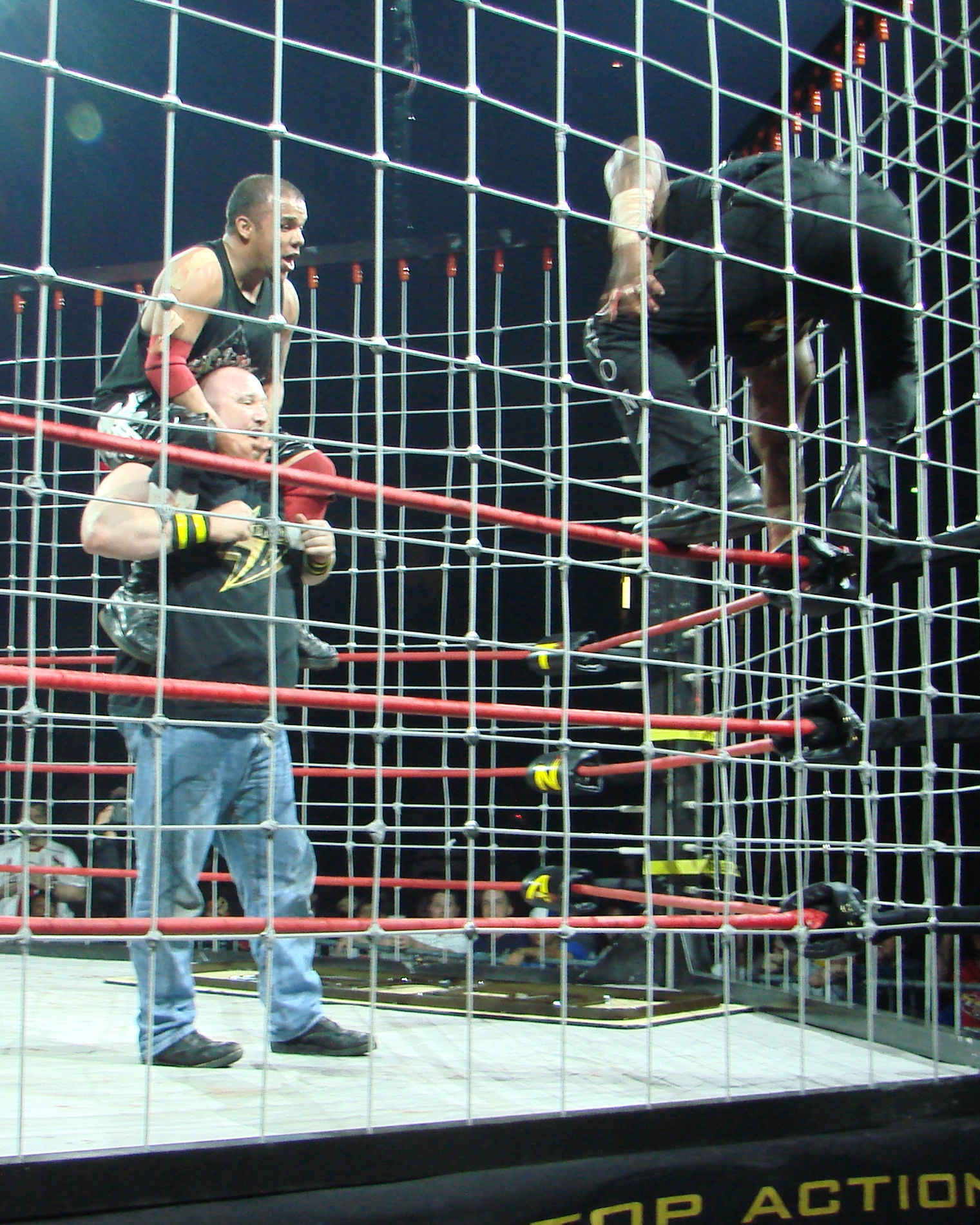
The Dudleyville device

Other variations of the maneuver, which use alternative flying attacks to knock opponents backward off the shoulders of another wrestler are often named after the doomsday device, or are described using the device term. One variation of the standard device, sometimes known as the Dudley Boyz's Dudleyville device, sees the wrestler (in this case Bubba Ray Dudley) keep hold of the opponent's legs, falling backward with them and completing a traditional electric chair drop maneuver.

Most frontal attack variants can see the grounded wrestler simply release, or, fall backward with the opponent, as in the basic doomsday device. However, not all variations of the device see the elevated wrestler attack an opponent head on, some see wrestlers strike from behind to propel the opponent forward off the other wrestler's shoulders. This allows the grounded wrestler to utilize a version of the electric chair which sees them drop to a seated position with the opponent landing face first between the wrestler's legs.

=== Doomsday clothesline ===
This variation is the one that is usually used when tag teams perform the doomsday device. This variation has one wrestler lift one opponent up in an electric chair position followed by another wrestler climbing to the top rope and performing a diving clothesline onto the elevated opponent, making the opponent fall backward off the wrestler's shoulder making them crash into the mat.

=== Doomsday DDT ===
This variation sees one wrestler lift their opponent in regular doomsday fashion and another wrestler climb to the top rope and perform a diving DDT onto the elevated opponent.

=== Doomsday diving crossbody ===
This variation sees one wrestler lift their opponent in regular doomsday fashion and another wrestler climb to the top rope and perform a diving crossbody onto the elevated opponent

=== Doomsday dropkick ===
This variation sees one wrestler lift their opponent in regular doomsday fashion and another wrestler climb to the top rope and perform a missile dropkick to knock their opponent down.

=== Doomsday rana ===
Unlike the previous variation, this device variant sees a headscissors throw used to pull the opponent forward off the shoulders of the other wrestler. The flying head scissors throw performed is commonly known as a diving hurricanrana, and is where this move gets the "Rana" part of its name.

=== Doomsday spear ===
This variation sees one wrestler lift their opponent in regular doomsday fashion and another wrestler climb to the top rope and perform a diving spear to knock their elevated opponent down by extra force.

=== Doomsday spinning wheel kick ===
This variation sees one wrestler lift their opponent in regular doomsday fashion and another wrestler climb to the top rope and performs a diving spinning heel kick to knock their opponent down. This move was used as a finisher by the tag team High Voltage.

=== Elevated cutter ===
Another variation exists which is the same doomsday style attack but rather than a bulldog or a clothesline, the attacking wrestler performs a cutter off of the elevated surface (usually the turnbuckle) pulling the opponent face first off the partners shoulders.

=== Elevated diving bulldog ===
This variation sees the elevated wrestler come from behind the raised opponent to push/drag them forward off the grounded wrestler's shoulders and down to the ground using a diving bulldog.

== See also ==
- Professional wrestling double-team maneuvers
- Professional wrestling holds - (Electric chair)
- Professional wrestling aerial techniques
- Professional wrestling attacks
