= PWG World Championship =

Professional wrestling championship

- The title belt in 2014

Details
- Promotion: Pro Wrestling Guerrilla
- Date established: August 30, 2003
- Date retired: November 11, 2023

Other names
- PWG Championship (2003–2006); PWG World Championship (2006–2023)
Statistics
- First champion: Frankie Kazarian
- Most reigns: Kevin Steen (3 reigns)
- Longest reign: Bandido (863 days)
- Shortest reign: Bryan Danielson (<1 day)
- Oldest champion: Jeff Cobb (36 years, 101 days)
- Youngest champion: El Generico (22 years, 227 days)
- Heaviest champion: Keith Lee (332 lb (151 kg))
- Lightest champion: Human Tornado (170 lb (77 kg))

The PWG World Championship was a professional wrestling world championship in the Pro Wrestling Guerrilla (PWG) professional wrestling promotion. It was introduced in 2003 as the PWG Championship. The inaugural champion was Frankie Kazarian, where the last champion is Daniel Garcia.

== History ==
The title became known under its current name in February 2006, when PWG had a two-event European Vacation tour stopping in Essen, Germany and Orpington, England. The title has also been defended in Japan in the Dragon Gate promotion, as well as in the United Kingdom in 1PW and again on PWG's European Vacation II tour in Paris, France, Portsmouth, England and Essen, Germany. The title was later defended by Chris Hero in Queensland, Australia on two occasions.

== Reigns ==
Overall, there was 32 reigns among 25 different wrestlers. The inaugural champion was Frankie Kazarian, who won the championship by defeating Joey Ryan in the finals of a sixteen man tournament on August 30, 2003, at PWG's Bad Ass Mother 3000 – Stage 2 event. At 863 days Bandido's reign is the longest in the title's history. Bryan Danielson was the shortest reigning champion in history by vacating it immediately after winning it for the second time. Kevin Steen hold the record for most reigns, with 3.
