= Field of Honor =

Field of Honor, Field of Honour, or Fields of Honor may refer to:

- Field of honor, the site of a duel
- Field of Honor (1986 film), a Dutch/South Korean war film
- Field of Honor (1987 film), a French war film
- A Field of Honor, a 1973 short film by Robert Zemeckis
- Field of Honor (board game), a medieval jousting game
- Fields of Honor (1918 film), a 1918 American drama film directed by Ralph Ince
- National Field of Honour, a Canadian war cemetery
- ROH Field of Honor, a professional wrestling event
