= Field of Honor (2014) =

Professional wrestling event

- Promotion: Ring of Honor
- Date: August 15, 2014
- City: Brooklyn, New York
- Venue: MCU Park
- Attendance: 1,500

Pay-per-view chronology
← Previous; Best in the World	Next → Death Before Dishonor XII

Field of Honor chronology
← Previous —	Next → 2015

Field of Honor (2014) was the inaugural Field of Honor professional wrestling event produced by Ring of Honor (ROH), that took place on August 15, 2014 at the MCU Park in Brooklyn, New York. Field of Honor '14 is on ROH Wrestling.com's Home Page in the Video on Demand Section.

== Production ==
Other on-screen personnel
Role	Name
Commentators	Joe Dombrowski
Commentators	Steve Corino
Commentators	Prince Nana

=== Storylines ===
Field of Honor featured professional wrestling matches, involving different wrestlers from pre-existing scripted feuds, plots, and storylines that played out on ROH's television programs. Wrestlers portrayed villains or heroes as they followed a series of events that built tension and culminated in a wrestling match or series of matches.

== Results ==
No.	Results	Stipulations	Times
1	Jay Lethal (with Truth Martini and Seleziya Sparx) (c) defeated Matt Taven	Steel cage match for the ROH World Television Championship	14:48
2	Mark Briscoe defeated Takaaki Watanabe	Singles match	6:20
3	R.D. Evans and Moose (with Ramon and Veda Scott) defeated Brutal Burgers (Bob Evans and Cheeseburger)	Tag team match	7:16
4	Michael Bennett (with Maria Kanellis) defeated Rocky Romero	Singles match	10:48
5	The Decade (B. J. Whitmer, Jimmy Jacobs and Roderick Strong) defeated Johnny Knockout, Ken Phoenix and Will Ferrara	Six-man tag team match	5:27
6	Silas Young defeated Tommaso Ciampa	Singles match	10:55
7	Cedric Alexander defeated A. C. H.	Singles match	8:56
8	ReDRagon (Kyle O'Reilly and Bobby Fish) (c) defeated The Addiction (Christopher Daniels and Frankie Kazarian)	Tag team match for the ROH Tag Team Championship	12:31
9	Michael Elgin (c) defeated Adam Cole, AJ Styles and Jay Briscoe	Four corner survival match for the ROH World Championship	16:25
(c) / – the champion(s) heading into the match

== See also ==
- ROH's annual events
- 2014 in professional wrestling
