= Battle of Los Angeles (2011) =

2011 professional wrestling tournament by PWG

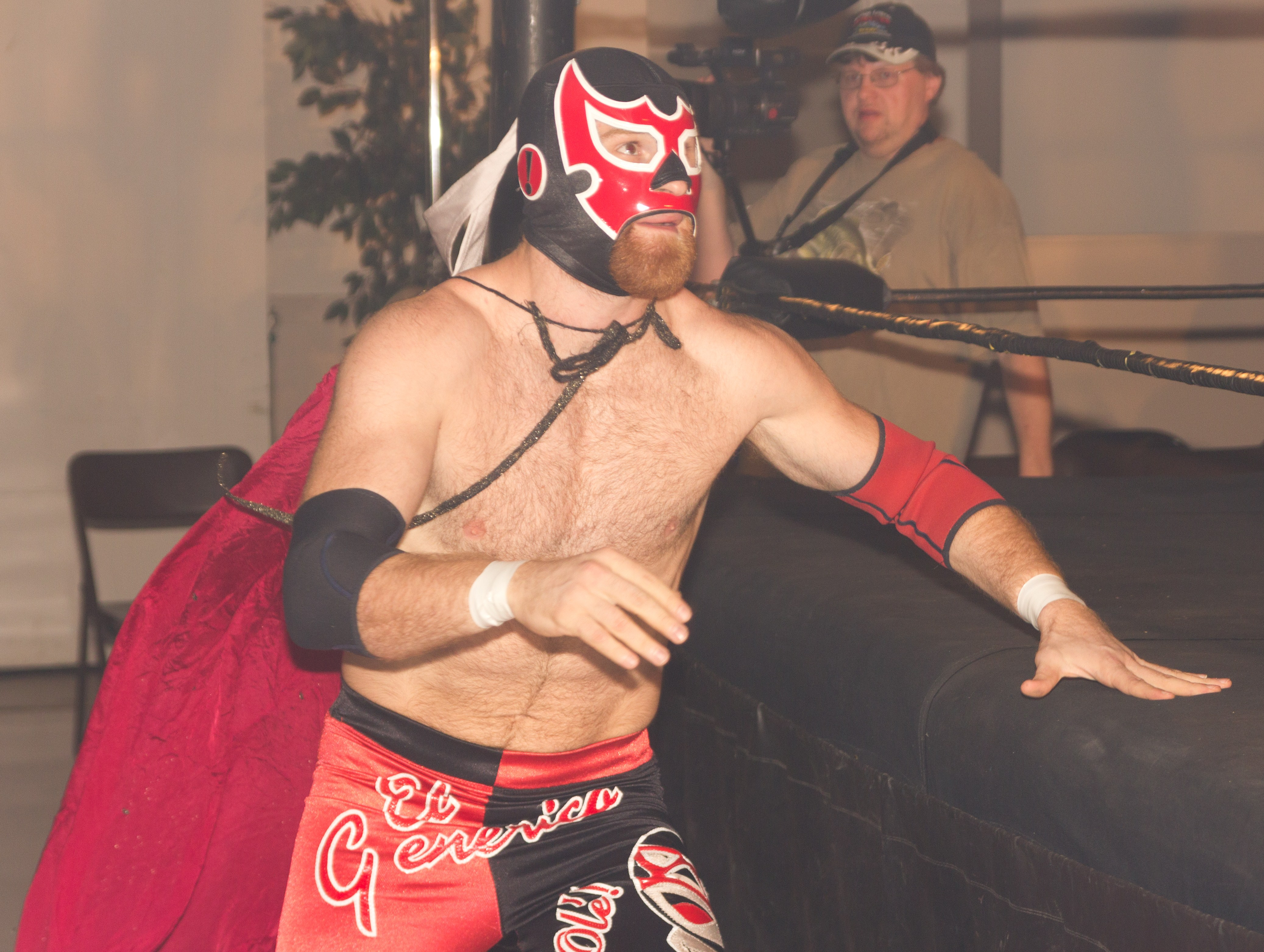
- The 2011 tournament winner El Generico
- Promotion: Pro Wrestling Guerrilla
- Date: August 20, 2011
- City: Reseda, Los Angeles, California
- Venue: American Legion Post #308

Event chronology
← Previous; Eight	Next → The Perils of Rock N' Roll Decadence

Battle of Los Angeles chronology
← Previous; 2010	Next → 2012

Battle of Los Angeles (2011) was the seventh Battle of Los Angeles professional wrestling tournament produced by Pro Wrestling Guerrilla (PWG). The event took place on August 20, 2011, at the American Legion Post #308 in Reseda, Los Angeles, California. It marked the first time that the Battle of Los Angeles tournament was held over one night.

The event concluded with a tournament final in which El Generico defeated Kevin Steen. The card included non-tournament matches aside from the tournament which saw The Young Bucks (Matt Jackson and Nick Jackson) retain the World Tag Team Championship against The Kings of Wrestling (Chris Hero and Claudio Castagnoli) and The Dynasty (Joey Ryan and Scorpio Sky) defeat The RockNES Monsters (Johnny Goodtime and Johnny Yuma) to become the #1 contenders for the World Tag Team Championship. The event featured the PWG debut of veteran wrestler Dave Finlay.

== Background ==
In July 2011, PWG announced the 2011 Battle of Los Angeles as an eight-man tournament to be held on one night unlike previous editions which took place across two or three nights. The participants announced for the tournament included Dave Finlay, the World Champion Kevin Steen, Roderick Strong, Eddie Edwards, Chris Hero, Claudio Castagnoli, El Generico and Willie Mack.

Aside from the tournament, it was announced that The Dynasty (Joey Ryan and Scorpio Sky) would take on The RockNES Monsters (Johnny Goodtime and Johnny Yuma) at Battle of Los Angeles. The winning team would receive a title shot against The Young Bucks for the World Tag Team Championship at The Perils of Rock N' Roll Decadence.

== Event ==
=== Quarterfinals ===
The tournament kicked off with a match between Chris Hero and Willie Mack. Mack reversed a Deathblow attempt by Hero into a backslide and pinned him for the win.

Next, the PWG World Champion Kevin Steen took on the debuting Dave Finlay. Steen injured Finlay's left leg by repeatedly smashing it into the ring post. Finlay's leg injury worsened when he tried to block a senton by Steen, allowing Steen to apply a Sharpshooter and make Finlay submit for the win.

Next, Claudio Castagnoli took on El Generico. Castagnoli countered a hurricanrana attempt by Generico into a sunset flip but Generico reversed it and pinned Castagnoli with a bridge for the win.

It was followed by the last quarterfinal match between Roderick Strong and Eddie Edwards. Edwards pinned Strong with a small package for the win.

Next, The Dynasty (Joey Ryan and Scorpio Sky) took on The RockNES Monsters (Johnny Goodtime and Johnny Yuma) to determine the #1 contenders for the PWG World Tag Team Championship. Sky pinned Goodtime with a roll-up for the win. After the match, The Young Bucks (Matt Jackson and Nick Jackson) attacked both teams and cut a promo in which they insulted the crowd and said that they had no opponents for that event. Kings of Wrestling (Chris Hero and Claudio Castagnoli) interrupted them and challenged Young Bucks to a match for the World Tag Team Championship later in the night which Bucks accepted.

=== Semifinals ===
The first semifinal match took place between El Generico and Willie Mack. Generico hit a Yakuza Kick to Mack and a Brainbustah!!! for the win.

The next semifinal took place between Kevin Steen and Eddie Edwards. Steen made Edwards submit to the Sharpshooter for the win.

Next, The Young Bucks defended the World Tag Team Championship against The Kings of Wrestling. Matt Jackson pinned Claudio Castagnoli with a roll-up while putting his feet on the ropes for the win. After the match, Kings of Wrestling attacked Young Bucks and delivered a KRS-1 to Matt.

=== Final ===
The tournament final took place between Kevin Steen and El Generico. Generico got a near-fall after three Yakuza Kicks and a Brainbustah!!!, leading to Generico hitting another brainbuster to Steen on the apron to win the 2011 Battle of Los Angeles tournament. After the match, the referee Rick Knox awarded the Battle of Los Angeles trophy to Generico and a little fan wearing Generico's mask who insulted Steen. Steen broke the trophy and retreated from the ring.

== Reception ==
Ryan Rozanski of 411Mania rated the event 8.5 out of 10 and praised it as "one of the most consistently entertaining installments of the tournament." He appreciated El Generico's tournament match against Claudio Castagnoli as a "great outing". The World Tag Team Championship match was considered "worthwhile". He stated that the tournament final between Generico and Kevin Steen was "a fantastic thirteen-minute war".

== Aftermath ==
After winning the Battle of Los Angeles, El Generico opted to challenge Kevin Steen for the PWG World Championship. At The Perils of Rock N' Roll Decadence, The Young Bucks attacked Steen after the latter retained the World Championship against Davey Richards, prompting Generico to make the save for Steen. Steen low blowed Generico and then Generico challenged Steen to a ladder match for the title at Steen Wolf, which was later made official. Generico went on to defeat Steen in the subsequent match to win the title.

The Dynasty received their World Tag Team Championship opportunity against The Young Bucks at The Perils of Rock N' Roll Decadence, which they failed to win.

== Results ==
No.	Results	Stipulations	Times
1	Willie Mack defeated Chris Hero	Singles match in the quarter-final round of Battle of Los Angeles tournament	19:17
2	Kevin Steen defeated Dave Finlay	Singles match in the quarter-final round of Battle of Los Angeles tournament	15:00
3	El Generico defeated Claudio Castagnoli	Singles match in the quarter-final round of Battle of Los Angeles tournament	15:18
4	Eddie Edwards defeated Roderick Strong	Singles match in the quarter-final round of Battle of Los Angeles tournament	17:50
5	The Dynasty (Joey Ryan and Scorpio Sky) defeated The RockNES Monsters (Johnny Goodtime and Johnny Yuma)	Tag team match to determine the #1 contenders for the PWG World Tag Team Championship	12:14
6	El Generico defeated Willie Mack	Singles match in the semi-final round of Battle of Los Angeles tournament	10:30
7	Kevin Steen defeated Eddie Edwards	Singles match in the semi-final round of Battle of Los Angeles tournament	12:32
8	The Young Bucks (Matt Jackson and Nick Jackson) (c) defeated The Kings of Wrestling (Chris Hero and Claudio Castagnoli)	Tag team match for the PWG World Tag Team Championship	20:44
9	El Generico defeated Kevin Steen	Singles match for the Battle of Los Angeles tournament final	13:46
(c) / – the champion(s) heading into the match

Battle of Los Angeles (2011)
Tournament information
- Sport: Professional wrestling
- Location: Reseda, Los Angeles, California
- Date: August 20, 2011
- Tournament format: Single elimination tournament
- Participants: 8

Final positions
- Champion: El Generico
- Runner-up: Kevin Steen

=== Tournament brackets ===
Quarterfinals
Chris Hero	Pin
Willie Mack	19:17
Claudio Castagnoli	Pin
El Generico	15:18
Eddie Edwards	Pin
Roderick Strong	17:50
Dave Finlay	Sub
Kevin Steen	15:00

Semifinals
Willie Mack	Pin
El Generico	10:30
Eddie Edwards	Sub
Kevin Steen	12:32

Finals
El Generico	Pin
Kevin Steen	13:46
