= Field of Honor (2015) =

Professional wrestling event

- Promotion: Ring of Honor
- Date: August 22, 2015
- City: Brooklyn, New York
- Venue: MCU Park
- Attendance: 2,000

Event chronology
← Previous; Death Before Dishonor XIII	Next → All Star Extravaganza VII

Field of Honor chronology
← Previous; 2014	Next → 2016

Field of Honor '15 was a professional wrestling event produced by Ring of Honor (ROH). It took place on August 22, 2015 at the MCU Park in Brooklyn, New York. This event was made available on ROH Wrestling.com's Home Page in the Video on Demand Section.

== Production ==
Other on-screen personnel
Role	Name
Commentators	Kevin Kelly
Commentators	King Corino
Commentators	Prince Nana
Commentators	Nigel McGuinness

=== Storylines ===
Field of Honor '15 featured professional wrestling matches, involving different wrestlers from pre-existing scripted feuds, plots, and storylines that played out on ROH's television programs. Wrestlers portrayed villains or heroes as they followed a series of events that built tension and culminated in a wrestling match or series of matches.

The card also featured wrestlers from ROH's international partner New Japan Pro-Wrestling, with which they have a talent exchange agreement.

On June 19, At Best In The World 2015 Jay Lethal would defeat Jay Briscoe in the main event at the event to retain the ROH World Television Championship and begin his first reign as ROH World Champion. At the same event, reDRagon would lose against The Addiction (Christopher Daniels and Frankie Kazarian). On The July 6th, It was announced that a Dream Match would take place at Field of Honor as ROH World Champion and ROH World Television Champion Jay Lethal would team with Shinsuke Nakamura to battle both Bobby Fish and Kyle O'Reilly of reDRagon at the event.

On July 6, ROH announced that Mr. ROH Roderick Strong would battle the IWGP Heavyweight Champion Kazuchika Okada at the event. Strong previously fought Hiroshi Tanahashi, Kushida, and Shinsuke Nakamura at both War of the Worlds '15 and Global Wars '15. Strong would only capture the win over Kushida. After Strong facing three great wrestlers in New Japan Pro-Wrestling he set his sights on the IWGP Heavyweight Champion Kazuchika Okada.

On July 6, ROH announced that War Machine (Hanson and Ray Rowe) would battle Killer Elite Squad (Davey Boy Smith Jr. and Lance Hoyt) after their first match on Ring of Honor TV would end in a double disqualification.

After defeating Roppongi Vice (Baretta and Rocky Romero) at Death Before Dishonor XIII, The Briscoes (Jay Briscoe and Mark Briscoe) would set their sights on another one of New Japan Pro-Wrestling's Super Junior Tag Teams in the Time Splitters (Alex Shelley and Kushida). ROH would make the match official for Field of Honor on July 27.

After failing to win the G1 Climax Tournament in 2015 Michael Elgin would set his sights on the IWGP Intercontinental Champion Hirooki Goto at Field of Honor after Goto defeated Elgin in the G1 Climax Tournament, Elgin would be looking to pick up a win over the Intercontinental Champion

After facing reDRagon's Kyle O'Reilly in the main event of Ring of Honor Wrestling, Adam Cole and O'Reilly would be attacked by The Addiction after the attack Adam Cole and Kyle O'Reilly would reunite Future Shock one more time by defeating both Daniels and Kazarian. After the match Chris Sabin of the KRD would make the save until reDRagon's Bobby Fish make the save for Cole and O'Reilly. This would result in Adam Cole taking on one-half of the ROH World Tag Team Championship Christopher Daniels at Field of Honor

After Moose would defeat Dalton Castle, Silas Young, Caprice Coleman, Brutal Bob Evans, and Cheeseburger in a weekly episode of Ring of Honor Wrestling. The Matchmaker of ROH Nigel McGuinness would announce that Moose, Dalton Castle, and Silas Young would be put into an Eight-Man Gauntlet at Field of Honor along with Frankie Kazarian, Takaaki Watanabe, Adam Page, Cedric Alexander, and Donovan Dijak. The winner of the match will face Jay Lethal for the ROH World Television Championship at any given time.

== Results ==
No.	Results	Stipulations	Times
1^{D}	Will Ferrara defeated Shaheem Ali	Singles match	—
2	Adam Cole defeated Christopher Daniels	Singles match	11:37
3	War Machine (Hanson and Ray Rowe) defeated Killer Elite Squad (Davey Boy Smith Jr. and Lance Archer)	Tag team match	10:05
4	Takaaki Watanabe defeated Dalton Castle, Adam Page (with B. J. Whitmer and Colby Corino), Frankie Kazarian (with Chris Sabin), Silas Young, Luke Williams, Moose (with Stokley Hathaway), Donovan Dijak (with Truth Martini and J. Diesel) and Cedric Alexander (with Veda Scott)	Nine-way gauntlet match for an ROH World Television Championship match	24:53
5	Matt Sydal, A. C. H. and The Young Bucks (Matt Jackson and Nick Jackson) defeated The Kingdom (Matt Taven and Michael Bennett) (with Maria Kanellis) and Roppongi Vice (Baretta and Rocky Romero)	Eight-man tag team match	14:38
6	Hirooki Goto defeated Michael Elgin	Singles match	12:42
7	The Briscoes (Jay Briscoe and Mark Briscoe) defeated Time Splitters (Alex Shelley and Kushida)	Tag team match	16:07
8	Kazuchika Okada defeated Roderick Strong	Singles match	17:23
9	Jay Lethal (with Truth Martini) and Shinsuke Nakamura defeated reDRagon (Bobby Fish and Kyle O'Reilly)	Tag team match	21:28
D / – this was a dark match

== See also ==
- ROH's annual events
- 2015 in professional wrestling
