= All Star Extravaganza VII =

2015 ROH pay-per-view event

- Promotional poster featuring various ROH wrestlers
- Promotion: Ring of Honor
- Date: September 18, 2015
- City: San Antonio, Texas
- Venue: San Antonio Shrine Auditorium
- Attendance: 1,000

Pay-per-view chronology
← Previous; Field of Honor (2015)	Next → Glory By Honor XIV

All Star Extravaganza chronology
← Previous; All Star Extravaganza VI	Next → All Star Extravaganza VIII

All Star Extravaganza VII was a professional wrestling pay-per-view event produced by Ring of Honor (ROH). It took place on September 18, 2015 at San Antonio Shrine Auditorium in San Antonio, Texas. It was the seventh event under the All Star Extravaganza chronology.

== Production ==
=== Storylines ===
Other on-screen personnel
Role	Name
Commentators	Kevin Kelly
Commentators	King Corino
Commentators	BJ Whitmer
Commentators	Nigel McGuinness

All Star Extravaganza VII featured professional wrestling matches that involved wrestlers from pre-existing scripted feuds or storylines that played out on ROH's television program, Ring of Honor Wrestling. Wrestlers portrayed heroes (faces) or villains (heels) as they followed a series of events that built tension and culminated in a wrestling match or series of matches.

On April 5, 2015 at a Live Ring of Honor Tour, Kyle O'Reilly would submit ROH World Champion Jay Lethal. On June 7, 2015, O'Reilly would yet again submit Jay Lethal as Lethal was heading into Best in the World against Jay Briscoe. On August 10, 2015 it was made official that O'Reilly would battle the ROH World Champion at All Star Extravaganza VII. After Lethal defeated Roderick Strong on a Championship Edition of ROH on September 9, 2015, both Lethal and O'Reilly would be set to collide on September 18, 2015.

On July 23, 2015 Bobby Fish would win a No. 1 Contenders Tournament to the ROH World Television Championship that was held by Jay Lethal. In the tournament Fish would defeat House of Truth members Donovan Dijak and J. Diesel. Two days later, Fish would defeat A. C. H. to go on to face the ROH World Television Champion at All Star Extravaganza. On September 2, 2015 Jay Lethal would defeat Hanson and retain his World Television Championship. Thus both members of reDRagon (Bobby Fish and Kyle O'Reilly) stared him in the eye as they prepared for their title shots against Lethal at All Star Extravaganza VII.

On July 24, 2015 at Death Before Dishonor XIII, The Addiction defended the ROH World Tag Team Championship against The Kingdom (Matt Taven and Michael Bennett), War Machine (Hanson and Ray Rowe), and reDRagon (Kyle O'Reilly and Bobby Fish), successfully retaining the titles. On August 12, 2015 Future Shock (Kyle O'Reilly and Adam Cole) would reunite in a losing effort for the ROH World Tag Team Championships. The Kingdom's Taven and Bennett would go on to defeat The Addiction, earning themselves a Tag Team Title shot at All Star Extravaganza. On September 9, The Addiction would defeat The Young Bucks (Matt and Nick Jackson) after The Kingdom interfered. ROH Matchmaker Nigel McGuiness announced that The Young Bucks would take part in the Tag Team Championship match against The Kingdom and The Addiction at All Star Extravaganza VII.

On September 10, 2015 ROH announced that AJ Styles vs. Adam Cole vs. Roderick Strong vs. Michael Elgin would take place in a Four Corner Survival Match with the winner earning a No. 1 Contendership Shot for the ROH World Championship against either Jay Lethal or Kyle O'Reilly.

The following day, Matt Sydal would defeat A. C. H. in the first match of the Best of 5 Series. The day after that, ACH would defeat Matt Sydal in the second match of the series with both matches taking place at the ROH Reloaded Tour. Prior to the first match of the series, ROH announced on August 22 that the third match of the ACH–Sydal series would take place at All Star Extravaganza VII.

On August 9, 2015 it was announced that The Briscoes (Jay Briscoe and Mark Briscoe) would issue an open challenge to any tag team in Ring of Honor to face them at All Star Extravaganza, after defeating RPG Vice (Rocky Romero and Baretta at Death Before Dishonor XIII and defeating Time Splitters (Alex Shelley and Kushida) at Field of Honor. On September 2, 2015 Jay Briscoe defeated Adam Page by disqualification after B. J. Whitmer interfered, with Mark Briscoe making the save. On September 11, Jay Briscoe defeated Adam Page in a No Holds Barred Match.

On June 13, 2015 Cedric Alexander defeated Moose after using a steel pipe. On July 24, at Death Before Dishonor XIII, Alexander would defeat Moose yet again using the same weapon. At Field of Honor, Alexander hit Moose with the pipe yet again, causing Silas Young to eliminate Moose from an ROH World Television Championship No. 1 Contenders Gauntlet. Later that night, Moose attacked Alexander with the pipe causing Silas Young to eliminate Alexander. On September 4, 2015 ROH announced that Moose would battle Cedric Alexander in a No Disqualification Match at All Star Extravaganza VII.

== Reception ==
Dave Meltzer, from the Wrestling Observer Newsletter, gave the World Tag Team match the highest rate, with four stars over five. Sean Radican, from PWTorch, criticized the booking and "as good as the wrestling was, the booking was equally as bad", focusing in the "lame finishes up and down the card from start to finish".

== Results ==
No.	Results	Stipulations	Times
1^{D}	Takaaki Watanabe and Will Ferrara defeated Donovan Dijak and Gregory James	Tag team match	—
2	Jay Lethal (c) (with Truth Martini) defeated Bobby Fish	Singles match for the ROH World Television Championship	14:09
3	Silas Young defeated Dalton Castle	Singles match If Young won, Castle would give his "boys" to Silas; If Castle won, Young would have become one of Castle's "boys".	12:25
4	The All Night Express (Rhett Titus and Kenny King) defeated The Briscoes (Jay Briscoe and Mark Briscoe)	Tag team match	8:32
5	Moose defeated Cedric Alexander	No Disqualification match	13:08
6	A. C. H. defeated Matt Sydal	Singles match in match #3 of a best-of-five series	16:28
7	The Kingdom (Matt Taven and Michael Bennett) (with Maria Kanellis) defeated The Addiction (Christopher Daniels and Frankie Kazarian) (c) and The Young Bucks (Matt Jackson and Nick Jackson)	Three-way tag team match for the ROH World Tag Team Championship	13:50
8	A.J. Styles defeated Roderick Strong, Adam Cole and Michael Elgin	Four corner survival match to determine the #1 contender to the ROH World Championship	14:30
9	Jay Lethal (c) (with Truth Martini) defeated Kyle O'Reilly	Singles match for the ROH World Championship	14:00
(c) / – the champion(s) heading into the match; D / – this was a dark match

== See also ==
- List of ROH pay-per-view events
