= ROH All Star Extravaganza =

- Promotions: Ring of Honor
- First event: All-Star Extravaganza (2002)

All Star Extravaganza was a professional wrestling event, held annually by the Ring of Honor (ROH) promotion. In 2014, it became an annual live pay-per-view (PPV) for Ring of Honor, taking place in September.

== Dates and venues ==
Event	Date	Venue	City	Main event	Ref
All-Star Extravaganza	November 9, 2002	Murphy Recreational Center	Philadelphia, Pennsylvania	Shinjiro Ohtani and Masato Tanaka vs. Low Ki and Steve Corino	
All-Star Extravaganza II	December 4, 2004	The Rex Plex	Elizabeth, New Jersey	Samoa Joe (c) vs. CM Punk for the ROH World Championship	
All-Star Extravaganza III	March 30, 2007	Michigan State Fairgrounds & Expo Center	Detroit, Michigan	Team Dragon Gate (CIMA, Dragon Kid, Ryo Saito & Susumu Yokosuka) vs. Team ROH (Austin Aries, Claudio Castagnoli, Delirious & Rocky Romero)	
All-Star Extravaganza IV	December 26, 2008	2300 Arena	Philadelphia, Pennsylvania	Bryan Danielson vs. Jerry Lynn	
All-Star Extravaganza V	August 3, 2013	Mattamy Athletic Center	Toronto, Ontario, Canada	The American Wolves (Davey Richards and Eddie Edwards) vs. Forever Hooligans (Alex Koslov and Rocky Romero) (c) for the ROH World Tag Team Championship	
All Star Extravaganza VI	September 6, 2014	Mattamy Athletic Center	Toronto, Ontario, Canada	reDRagon (Bobby Fish and Kyle O'Reilly) (c) vs. The Young Bucks (Matt Jackson and Nick Jackson) (c) for the ROH World Tag Team Championship	
All Star Extravaganza VII	September 18, 2015	San Antonio Shrine Auditorium	San Antonio, Texas	Jay Lethal (c) vs. Kyle O'Reilly for the ROH World Championship	
All Star Extravaganza VIII	September 30, 2016	Lowell Memorial Auditorium	Lowell, Massachusetts	The Young Bucks (Matt Jackson and Nick Jackson) vs The Addiction (Christopher Daniels and Frankie Kazarian) (c) and The Motor City Machine Guns Alex Shelley and Chris Sabin) for the ROH World Tag Team Championship	
(c) – refers to the champion(s) heading into the match

== See also ==
- ROH's annual events
