= Battle of Los Angeles (2012) =

2012 professional wrestling tournament by PWG

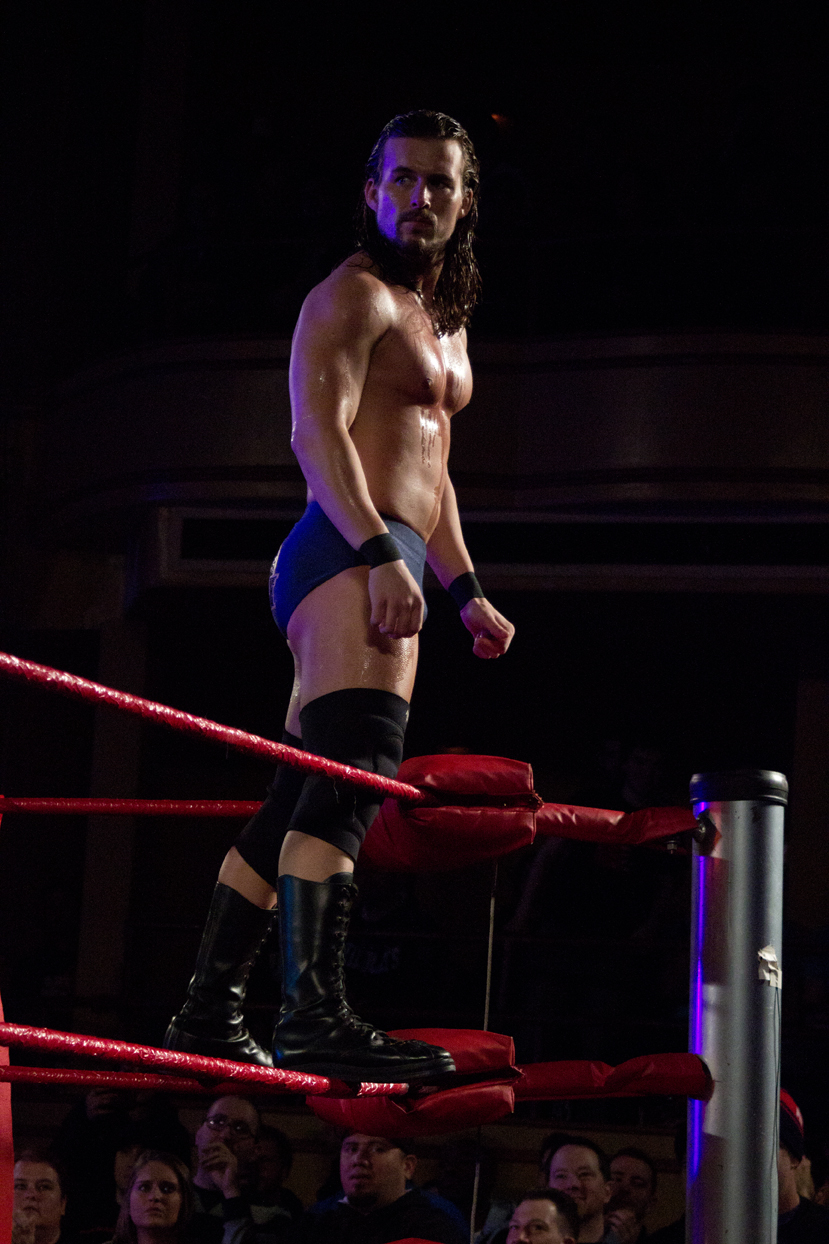
- The 2012 tournament winner Adam Cole
- Promotion: Pro Wrestling Guerrilla
- Date: Night One: September 1, 2012; Night Two: September 2, 2012
- City: Reseda, Los Angeles, California
- Venue: American Legion Post #308

Event chronology
← Previous; Threemendous III	Next → Failure To Communicate

Battle of Los Angeles chronology
← Previous; 2011	Next → 2013

Battle of Los Angeles (2012) was the eighth Battle of Los Angeles professional wrestling tournament produced by Pro Wrestling Guerrilla (PWG). It was a two-night event which took place on September 1 and September 2, 2012, at the American Legion Post #308 in Reseda, Los Angeles, California.

It was a sixteen-man tournament which concluded with Adam Cole defeating Michael Elgin in the final. Aside from the tournament, two six-man tag team matches took place on the second night. The first match pitted the losers of the first round as B-Boy, Drake Younger and Willie Mack defeated Team Statutory (Davey Richards, Joey Ryan and Kyle O'Reilly) and the team of World Champion Kevin Steen, El Generico and referee Rick Knox defeated Brian Cage and The Young Bucks (Matt Jackson and Nick Jackson).

== Background ==
Initially, on July 22, the tournament was announced as taking place in one night on September 1 at the American Legion Post #308 in Reseda, California. It was originally supposed to be a twelve-man tournament with the participants including the 2011 winner El Generico, Roderick Strong, Michael Elgin, Sami Callihan, Adam Cole, Kyle O'Reilly, Eddie Edwards, Ricochet, Willie Mack, Drake Younger, Brian Cage, and B-Boy. However, the following day it was expanded to two nights with four more wrestlers added, when another event scheduled for the Reseda venue was cancelled. The next four participants included the World Champion Kevin Steen, Davey Richards, Joey Ryan and T.J. Perkins.

== Event ==
=== Night One ===
The Battle of Los Angeles tournament kicked off with a match between Joey Ryan and T.J. Perkins. Perkins delivered a Detonation Kick to Ryan for the win.

Next, Roderick Strong took on Drake Younger. Strong delivered a Gibson Driver to Younger for the win.

Next, Eddie Edwards took on Kyle O'Reilly. Edwards applied an Achilles lock on O'Reilly and stomped his head repeatedly into the match, forcing the referee to stop the match.

Next, B-Boy took on Brian Cage. Cage countered a shining wizard attempt by B-Boy into a Weapon X for the win.

Next, the PWG World Champion Kevin Steen took on Ricochet. Brian Cage interfered in the match to distract Steen. Steen delivered a package piledriver to Cage but Ricochet capitalized on the distraction and delivered a reverse hurricanrana and a 630° senton to Steen for the win.

Next, Willie Mack took on Sami Callihan. Callihan got a near-fall after hitting two lariats to Mack. Callihan then hit a third lariat to Mack for the win.

Next, El Generico took on Adam Cole. Generico hit a Yakuza Kick to Cole but Cole countered by pinning him with a cradle for the win.

It was followed by the final match in the first round between Davey Richards and Michael Elgin. After Richards countered an enzuigiri by Elgin into an ankle lock, Elgin hit a knee lift and then nailed a turnbuckle powerbomb and an Elgin Bomb for the win. Richards congratulated Elgin after the match and told him to win the tournament.

=== Night Two ===
Quarterfinals

The quarterfinal round of the Battle of Los Angeles began with a match between Sami Callihan and T.J. Perkins. Callihan countered a Detonation Kick attempt by Perkins by applying a over-the-shoulder single leg Boston crab and make him submit for the win.

Next, Eddie Edwards took on Adam Cole. After a series of superkicks, Cole delivered a Florida Keys to Edwards for the win.

Next, Brian Cage took on Michael Elgin. Cage knocked out the referee while spinning Elgin in the ring allowing Kevin Steen to interfere in the match to avenge Cage's interference which cost Steen, his first round match against Ricochet. Steen delivered a Deep Sea Diverticulitis to Cage but Elgin got a near-fall. After a series of counters, Elgin delivered a powerbomb, a turnbuckle powerbomb and an Elgin Bomb to Cage for the win. Steen attacked Cage after the match until The Young Bucks (Matt Jackson and Nick Jackson) ran in to attack Steen. Referee Rick Knox tried to make the save but Cage attacked him. El Generico then made the save and then Knox challenged Cage and Bucks to a match later in the night with Steen and Generico as his partners. He tried to convince Steen and Generico to put their differences aside but Steen walked out.

It was followed by the next quarterfinal in which Roderick Strong took on Ricochet. Ricochet moved out of a Stronghold by Strong into a hurricanrana and followed it with a shooting star press for the win.

Next, Team Statutory (Davey Richards, Joey Ryan and Kyle O'Reilly) took on the team of B-Boy, Drake Younger and Willie Mack in a six-man tag team match. Mack delivered a Chocolate Thunder Driver to Richards for the win.

Semifinals

The first semifinal match took place between Adam Cole and Sami Callihan. Cole got out of a fireman's carry by Callihan on the top rope and delivered a superkick to Callihan's knee. He followed it with a superkicks to Callihan and then applied a figure four leglock on Callihan to make him submit for the win.

Next, Michael Elgin took on Ricochet. Elgin countered a hurricanrana from the top rope attempt by Ricochet into a superbomb and then followed it with an Elgin Bomb for the win.

It was followed by the penultimate match in which El Generico and referee Rick Knox took on Brian Cage and The Young Bucks. The match originally started as a handicap match until Kevin Steen showed up in the match as Generico and Knox's third partner. Knox delivered a tornado DDT to Matt Jackson. It was followed by a package piledriver by Steen, a brainbuster by Generico and a big splash by Knox for the win.

Final

The Battle of Los Angeles final took place between Michael Elgin and Adam Cole. Cole delivered a Florida Keys to Elgin for the win. Cole refused to acknowledge the "future" nickname assigned to him and said that he was the best wrestler around. He then called out the World Champion Kevin Steen and insulted him, prompting Steen to cut a promo but Cole kicked him in the groin and stole the World Championship belt.

== Reception ==
Jake St-Pierre heavily praised the 2012 Battle of Los Angeles, feeling that it topped "DDT4 as PWG's best tourney of the year" and "the best tournament to happen in wrestling" in any promotion during 2012.

According to him, the night one was "an ultra-consistent show and super easy to sit through" with "amazing stuff top-to-bottom". He specifically praised the match between Davey Richards and Michael Elgin while considering Kevin Steen and Ricochet's contest, "a phenomenal match".

He considered the night two to be "the Show of the Year candidate" and "a totally watchable show with insane variety when it comes to the style of matches you want to see".

== Aftermath ==
After winning the 2012 Battle of Los Angeles, Adam Cole received his title shot for the PWG World Championship against Kevin Steen in a Guerrilla Warfare at the first Mystery Vortex event. Cole defeated Steen to win the title.

== Results ==
Night 1 (September 1)
No.	Results	Stipulations	Times
1	T.J. Perkins defeated Joey Ryan	Singles match in the first round of Battle of Los Angeles tournament	13:19
2	Roderick Strong defeated Drake Younger	Singles match in the first round of Battle of Los Angeles tournament	13:50
3	Eddie Edwards defeated Kyle O'Reilly	Singles match in the first round of Battle of Los Angeles tournament	17:47
4	Brian Cage defeated B-Boy	Singles match in the first round of Battle of Los Angeles tournament	16:57
5	Ricochet defeated Kevin Steen	Singles match in the first round of Battle of Los Angeles tournament	15:53
6	Sami Callihan defeated Willie Mack	Singles match in the first round of Battle of Los Angeles tournament	13:28
7	Adam Cole defeated El Generico	Singles match in the first round of Battle of Los Angeles tournament	11:06
8	Michael Elgin defeated Davey Richards	Singles match in the first round of Battle of Los Angeles tournament	23:22

Night 2 (September 2)
No.	Results	Stipulations	Times
1	Sami Callihan defeated T.J. Perkins	Singles match in the quarter-final round of Battle of Los Angeles tournament	12:49
2	Adam Cole defeated Eddie Edwards	Singles match in the quarter-final round of Battle of Los Angeles tournament	15:08
3	Michael Elgin defeated Brian Cage	Singles match in the quarter-final round of Battle of Los Angeles tournament	17:47
4	Ricochet defeated Roderick Strong	Singles match in the quarter-final round of Battle of Los Angeles tournament	16:28
5	B-Boy, Drake Younger and Willie Mack defeated Team Statutory (Davey Richards, Joey Ryan and Kyle O'Reilly)	Six-man tag team match	15:59
6	Adam Cole defeated Sami Callihan	Singles match in the semi-final round of Battle of Los Angeles tournament	10:14
7	Michael Elgin defeated Ricochet	Singles match in the semi-final round of Battle of Los Angeles tournament	13:58
8	El Generico, Kevin Steen and Rick Knox defeated Brian Cage and The Young Bucks (Matt Jackson and Nick Jackson)	Six-man tag team match	17:57
9	Adam Cole defeated Michael Elgin	Singles match in the Battle of Los Angeles tournament final	13:54

=== Tournament brackets ===
Battle of Los Angeles (2012)
Tournament information
- Sport: Professional wrestling
- Location: Reseda, Los Angeles, California
- Dates: September 1, 2012–September 2, 2012
- Tournament format: Single elimination tournament
- Participants: 16

Final positions
- Champion: Adam Cole
- Runner-up: Michael Elgin

First round
Sami Callihan	Pin
Willie Mack	13:28
T. J. Perkins	Pin
Joey Ryan	13:19
Adam Cole	Pin
El Generico	11:06
Eddie Edwards	Sub
Kyle O'Reilly	17:47
Ricochet	Pin
Kevin Steen	15:53
Roderick Strong	Pin
Drake Younger	13:50
Michael Elgin	Pin
Davey Richards	23:22
B-Boy	Pin
Brian Cage	16:57

Second round
Sami Callihan	Sub
T. J. Perkins	12:49
Adam Cole	Pin
Eddie Edwards	15:08
Ricochet	Pin
Roderick Strong	16:28
Michael Elgin	Pin
Brian Cage	17:47

Semifinals
Sami Callihan	Sub
Adam Cole	10:14
Michael Elgin	Pin
Ricochet	13:58

Finals
Adam Cole	Pin
Michael Elgin	13:54
