= Battle of Los Angeles (2009) =

2009 professional wrestling tournament by PWG

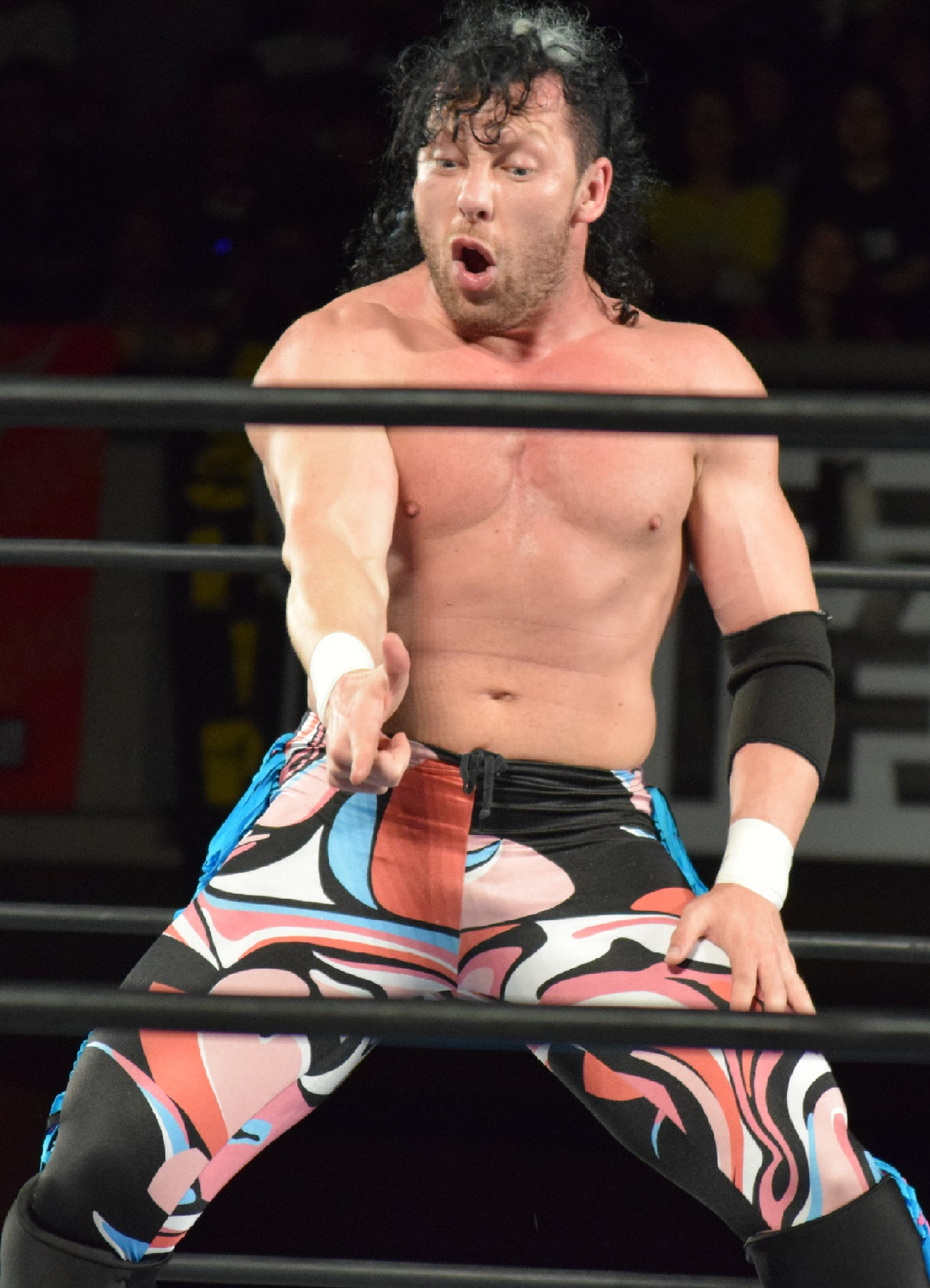
- The 2009 tournament winner Kenny Omega
- Promotion: Pro Wrestling Guerrilla
- Date: Night One: November 20, 2009; Night Two: November 21, 2009
- City: Reseda, Los Angeles, California
- Venue: American Legion Post No. 308

Event chronology
← Previous; Against The Grain	Next → Kurt Russellreunion

Battle of Los Angeles chronology
← Previous; 2008	Next → 2010

Battle of Los Angeles (2009) was the fifth Battle of Los Angeles professional wrestling tournament produced by Pro Wrestling Guerrilla (PWG). It was a two-night event which took place on November 20 and November 21, 2009 at the American Legion Post No. 308 in Reseda, Los Angeles, California.

The vacant PWG World Championship was decided in the tournament as Kenny Omega defeated Roderick Strong in the tournament final to win the vacant title after former champion Bryan Danielson vacated the title in his farewell match at Guerre Sans Frontières on September 4. Non-tournament matches included The Cutler Brothers (Brandon and Dustin) versus Malachi Jackson and Ryan Taylor in a tag team match on the first night, Colt Cabana, Jerome Robinson and Johnny Goodtime versus Austin Aries and The Cutler Brothers in a six-man tag team match and The Young Bucks (Matt Jackson and Nick Jackson) versus El Generico and Kevin Steen for the World Tag Team Championship on the second night.

== Background ==
At Guerre Sans Frontières, Bryan Danielson defeated Chris Hero in the former's farewell match in PWG to win the PWG World Championship and then immediately vacated the title due to signing a developmental contract with WWE. After vacating the title, Danielson announced that the new champion would be crowned in the 2009 Battle of Los Angeles tournament.

=== Qualification ===
Qualifying matches took place for the Battle of Los Angeles tournament at the Against the Grain event on October 2, where local newcomers Brandon Gatson and Jerome Robinson won fatal four-way matches to qualify for the tournament.

Against The Grain – October 2, 2009
No.	Results	Stipulations	Times
1	Brandon Gatson defeated Brandon Cutler, Johnny Goodtime and Malachi Jackson	Four-way match to qualify for the 2009 Battle of Los Angeles	6:49
2	Jerome Robinson defeated Charles Mercury, Dustin Cutler and Shane Haste	Four-way match to qualify for the 2009 Battle of Los Angeles	7:01

Johnny Goodtime was given a spot in the tournament despite losing in the qualification as he replaced the originally scheduled participant Chris Sabin, who was forced to pull out due to a neck injury.

== Event ==
=== Night 1 ===
The night one of the tournament kicked off with a tag team match between The Cutler Brothers (Brandon Cutler and Dustin Cutler) and the team of Malachi Jackson and Ryan Taylor. Cutlers nailed Taylor with an aided spike piledriver for the win.

Next, the Battle of Los Angeles tournament began for the vacant PWG World Championship with a match between Scott Lost and Jerome Robinson. Robinson avoided a Big Fat Kill by Lost but Lost applied a legsweep on Robinson and delivered a Big Fat Kill to Robinson for the win.

Next, Human Tornado took on Matt Jackson. Jackson and his brother Nick Jackson constantly interfered in the match leading to Rick Knox making the save and preventing Nick from interfering in the match. This allowed Tornado to hit a DND to Matt for the win.

Next, Colt Cabana took on Joey Ryan. Ryan blocked a Flying Asshole by Cabana with a That '70s Kick for the win.

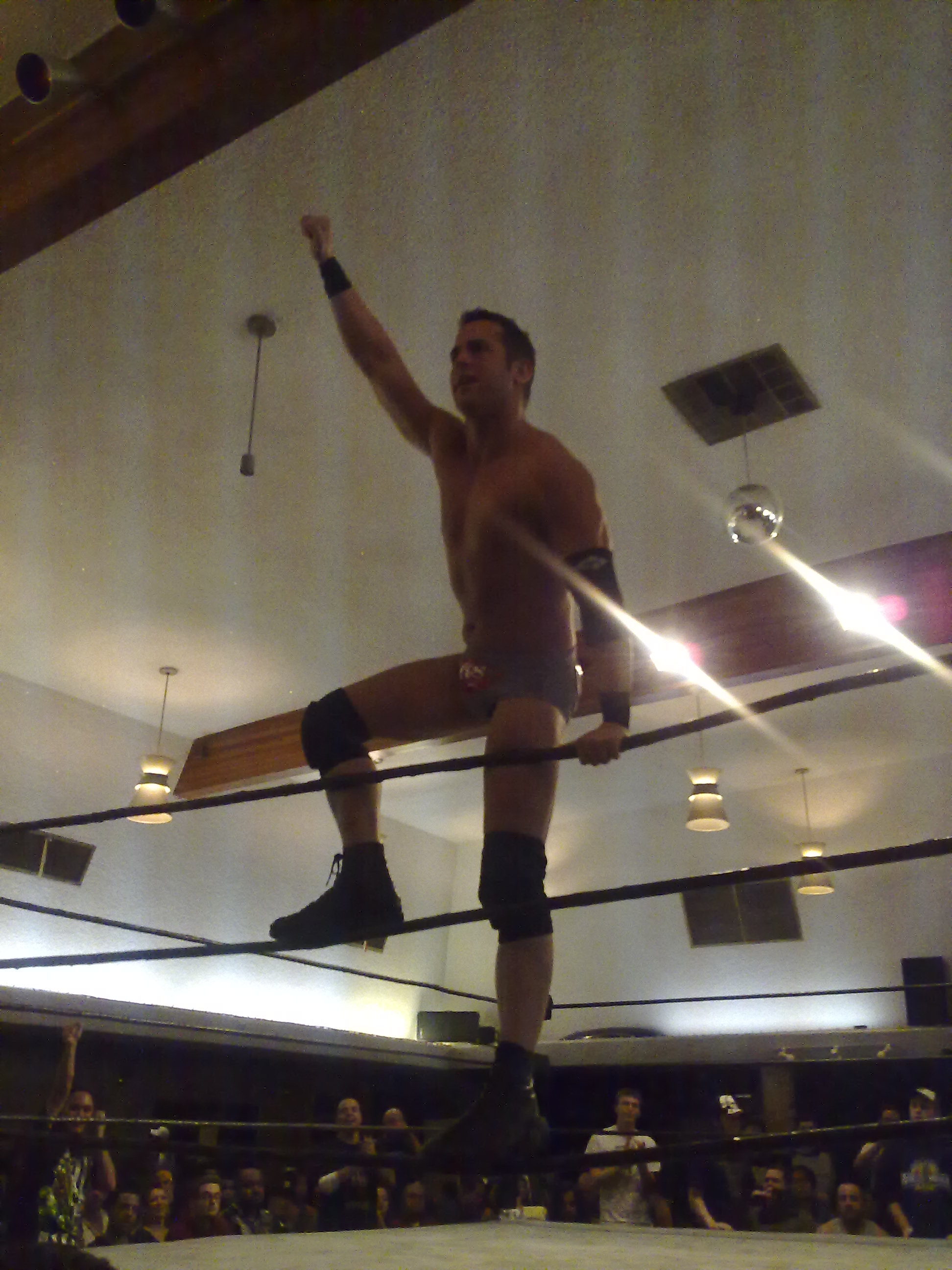
The tournament runner-up Roderick Strong making his entrance to the ring.

Next, Roderick Strong took on Johnny Goodtime. Strong countered a handstand move by Goodtime by kicking him and then hit a backbreaker and applied a Stronghold on Goodtime to make him submit to the hold.

Next, Brandon Gatson took on Nick Jackson. Gatson blocked a 450° splash by Jackson by raising up his knees and then delivered a sitout side facebuster to Jackson for the win.

Next, the ROH World Champion Austin Aries took on Brian Kendrick. The match had a bizarre ending as Aries hit Kendrick with the ROH World Championship title belt while Kendrick hit Aries with a foreign object which knocked both men out but Kendrick's arm landed on Aries' body and he inadvertently pinned Aries for the win.

It was followed by the final match of the opening round between Kenny Omega and Kevin Steen. Steen countered a Croyt's Wrath attempt by Omega into a package piledriver. Steen then attempted to pin Omega but Omega countered it with a crucifix for the win.

=== Night 2 ===
The second night of the Battle of Los Angeles began with the second round of the tournament. The first match took place between Brian Kendrick and Joey Ryan. After avoiding Kendrick's underhanded tactics, Ryan hit a That 70's Kick to Kendrick knocking him out of the ring and then Ryan delivered a second That 70's Kick to Kendrick inside the ring for the win.

Next, Scott Lost took on Kenny Omega. Omega avoided a Superman Spear by Lost and delivered a Croyt's Wrath to Lost for the win.

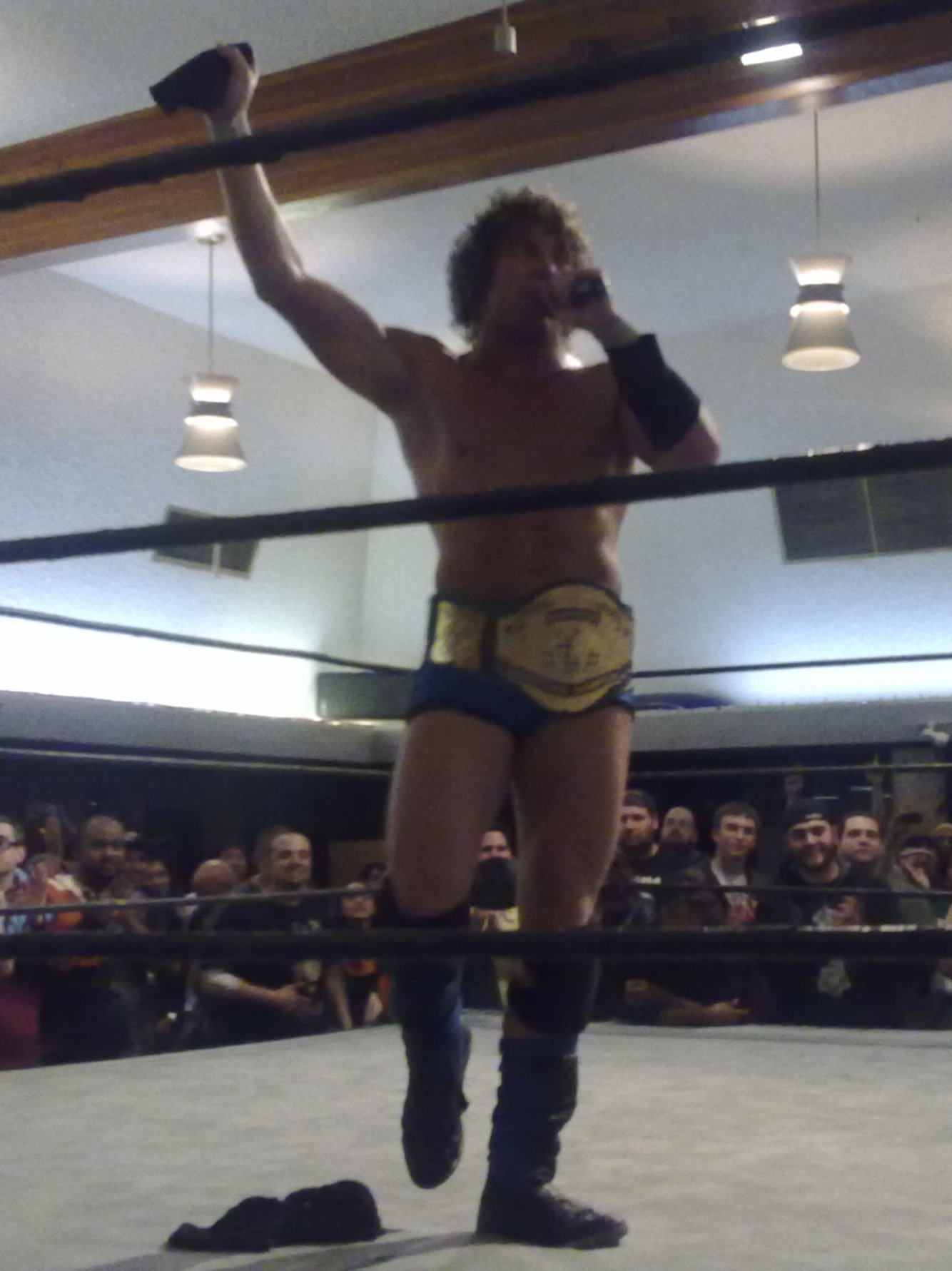
Kenny Omega won the vacant PWG World Championship by winning the 2009 Battle of Los Angeles.

It was followed by a match between Alex Shelley and Brandon Gatson. After hitting two superkicks to Gatson, Shelley attempted a third superkick but Gatson countered with a jackknife and pinned Shelley for the win.

Next, Human Tornado took on Roderick Strong. Strong ended the match by hitting a Power-Breaker and followed it with a mule kick for the win.

It was followed by a six-man tag team match featuring wrestlers who either failed to qualify for the tournament or lost in the opening round. The team of Colt Cabana, Jerome Robinson and Johnny Goodtime took on Austin Aries and The Cutler Brothers. Robinson hit a tiger feint kick and a reverse piledriver to Brandon Cutler for the win.

Next, the semifinal round of the Battle of Los Angeles tournament took place with Joey Ryan taking on Kenny Omega in the first semifinal match. Ryan attempted to nail a That 70's Kick to Omega but Omega countered it with two Hadoukens and hit a Croyt's Wrath for the win.

It was followed by the second semifinal match between Roderick Strong and Brandon Gatson. Strong nailed Gatson with a double underhook powerbomb and a mule kick for the win.

Later, the penultimate match of the event took place in which The Young Bucks defended the World Tag Team Championship against El Generico and Kevin Steen. The original referee was knocked out after an accidental knee strike by Nick Jackson which led to Rick Knox stepping in to officiate the match. Nick then low blowed Steen after Steen tried to hit a package piledriver from the top rope and delivered a German suplex to Generico on the apron and then the Young Bucks hit a total of ten superkicks to Steen to retain the titles.

It was followed by the main event match between Kenny Omega and Roderick Strong, the tournament final of the Battle of Los Angeles for the vacant PWG World Championship. Omega hit a reverse headscissors takedown and a Croyt's Wrath to Strong for the win, thus winning the tournament and the vacant World Championship in the process. After the match, Omega invited the Young Bucks, who attacked him and then Brian Kendrick joined Young Bucks in triple teaming Omega until El Generico made the save forcing them to retreat.

== Reception ==
Ryan Rozanski of 411Mania rated the night one of the tournament 7.5 out of 10, considering it "a consistent show and a breeze to watch". According to him, "Half of the tournament matches clocked in at three stars or above and the PWG locals shined throughout the card." He praised a few matches of the tournament by quoting "(El) Generico and (Alex) Shelley comes awfully close. Elsewhere, (Kenny) Omega and (Kevin) Steen offer a smartly worked contest, while (Johnny) Goodtime put in his best performance to date." He recommended that there was "enough quality on this show to warrant a purchase".

He also praised the night two of the tournament, rating it 8.5 out of 10 and considered it "an extremely good show that just manages to raise the bar set by Night One". He praised the World Tag Team Championship match, which would "make you love professional wrestling". According to him, the event "barely misses equaling the best PWG shows of the year, it will illustrate for you why PWG can be considered the best pro wrestling promotion going today."

== Aftermath ==
Kenny Omega held the PWG World Championship for two months before losing the title to Davey Richards at As The Worm Turns.

El Generico continued to pursue the World Tag Team Championship and resumed his feud with The Young Bucks as he teamed with Chuck Taylor to challenge the Bucks for the titles at As The Worm Turns but failed to win. Generico then formed a tag team with Paul London called ¡Peligro Abejas! to participate in the 2010 Dynamite Duumvirate Tag Team Title Tournament. They won the tournament by defeating Young Bucks in the final for the World Tag Team Championship.

== Results ==
Night 1 (November 20)
No.	Results	Stipulations	Times
1	The Cutler Brothers (Brandon Cutler and Dustin Cutler) defeated Malachi Jackson and Ryan Taylor	Tag team match	8:43
2	Scott Lost defeated Jerome Robinson	Battle of Los Angeles tournament first round match	7:46
3	Human Tornado defeated Matt Jackson (with Nick Jackson)	Battle of Los Angeles tournament first round match	14:14
4	Joey Ryan defeated Colt Cabana	Battle of Los Angeles tournament first round match	10:49
5	Roderick Strong defeated Johnny Goodtime via submission	Battle of Los Angeles tournament first round match	16:56
6	Brandon Gatson defeated Nick Jackson (with Matt Jackson)	Battle of Los Angeles tournament first round match	12:16
7	Brian Kendrick defeated Austin Aries	Battle of Los Angeles tournament first round match	14:29
8	Kenny Omega defeated Kevin Steen	Battle of Los Angeles tournament first round match	12:45
9	Alex Shelley defeated El Generico	Battle of Los Angeles tournament first round match	16:44

Night 2 (November 21)
No.	Results	Stipulations	Times
1	Joey Ryan defeated Brian Kendrick	Battle of Los Angeles tournament second round match	9:01
2	Kenny Omega defeated Scott Lost	Battle of Los Angeles tournament second round match	13:52
3	Brandon Gatson defeated Alex Shelley	Battle of Los Angeles tournament second round match	11:51
4	Roderick Strong defeated Human Tornado	Battle of Los Angeles tournament second round match	9:41
5	Colt Cabana, Jerome Robinson and Johnny Goodtime defeated Austin Aries and The Cutler Brothers (Brandon Cutler and Dustin Cutler)	Six-man tag team match	12:55
6	Kenny Omega defeated Joey Ryan	Battle of Los Angeles tournament semi-final match	15:02
7	Roderick Strong defeated Brandon Gatson	Battle of Los Angeles tournament semi-final match	5:28
8	The Young Bucks (Matt Jackson and Nick Jackson) (c) defeated El Generico and Kevin Steen	Tag team match for the PWG World Tag Team Championship	22:16
9	Kenny Omega defeated Roderick Strong	Battle of Los Angeles tournament final for the vacant PWG World Championship	19:40
(c) / – the champion(s) heading into the match

=== Tournament brackets ===
Battle of Los Angeles (2009)
Tournament information
- Sport: Professional wrestling
- Location: Reseda, Los Angeles, California
- Dates: November 20, 2009–November 21, 2009
- Tournament format(s): Single elimination tournament
- Participants: 16

Final positions
- Champion: Kenny Omega
- Runner-up: Roderick Strong

First round
Kenny Omega	Pin
Kevin Steen	12:45
Scott Lost	Pin
Jerome Robinson	07:46
Austin Aries	Pin
Brian Kendrick	14:29
Colt Cabana	Pin
Joey Ryan	10:49
Brandon Gatson	Pin
Nick Jackson	12:16
El Generico	Pin
Alex Shelley	16:44
Johnny Goodtime	Sub
Roderick Strong	16:56
Matt Jackson	Pin
Human Tornado	14:14

Second round
Kenny Omega	Pin
Scott Lost	13:52
Brian Kendrick	Pin
Joey Ryan	09:01
Brandon Gatson	Pin
Alex Shelley	11:51
Roderick Strong	Pin
Human Tornado	09:41

Semifinals
Kenny Omega	Pin
Joey Ryan	15:05
Brandon Gatson	Pin
Roderick Strong	05:28

Finals
Kenny Omega	Pin
Roderick Strong	19:40
