= Field of Honor (2016) =

Professional wrestling event

- Promotion: Ring of Honor
- Date: August 27, 2016
- City: Brooklyn, New York
- Venue: MCU Park

Pay-per-view chronology
← Previous; Death Before Dishonor XIV	Next → All Star Extravaganza VIII

Field of Honor chronology
← Previous; 2015	Next → —

Field of Honor (2016) was a professional wrestling event produced by Ring of Honor (ROH), that took place on August 27, 2016, at the MCU Park in Brooklyn, New York. Field of Honor '16 is on ROH Wrestling.com's Home Page in the Video on Demand Section.

== Storylines ==
Field of Honor featured professional wrestling matches, involving different wrestlers from pre-existing scripted feuds, plots, and storylines that played out on ROH's television programs. Wrestlers portrayed villains or heroes as they followed a series of events that built tension and culminated in a wrestling match or series of matches.

== Results ==
No.	Results	Stipulations	Times
1^{D}	Leon St. Giovanni and Shaheem Ali defeated Joey Daddiego and Ken Phoenix	Tag team match	—
2^{D}	Taeler Hendrix defeated Deonna Purrazzo	Women of Honor Singles match	6:09
3	Kushida defeated Dalton Castle (with The Boys)	Singles match	11:20
4	Bobby Fish (c) defeated Evil	Singles match for the ROH World Television Championship	11:56
5	Michael Elgin (c) defeated Donovan Dijak (with Prince Nana)	Singles match for the IWGP Intercontinental Championship	15:16
6	The Addiction (Christopher Daniels and Frankie Kazarian) (c) defeated The Briscoes (Jay Briscoe and Mark Briscoe), War Machine (Hanson and Ray Rowe), The All Night Express (Rhett Titus and Kenny King), Chaos (Gedo and Toru Yano), Cheeseburger and Will Ferrara, and Shane Taylor and Keith Lee	Tag Team Gauntlet match for the ROH World Tag Team Championship	28:34
7	Bullet Club (Matt Jackson, Nick Jackson, Hangman Page and Yujiro Takahashi) defeated Alex Shelley, Chris Sabin, A. C. H. and Lio Rush	Eight-man tag team match	14:13
8	Kyle O'Reilly defeated Katsuyori Shibata	Singles match	13:30
9	Adam Cole (c) defeated Jay Lethal, Hiroshi Tanahashi and Tetsuya Naito	Four corner survival match for the ROH World Championship	17:21
(c) / – the champion(s) heading into the match; D / – this was a dark match

== See also ==
- ROH's annual events
- 2016 in professional wrestling
