= Battle of Los Angeles (2010) =

2010 professional wrestling tournament by PWG

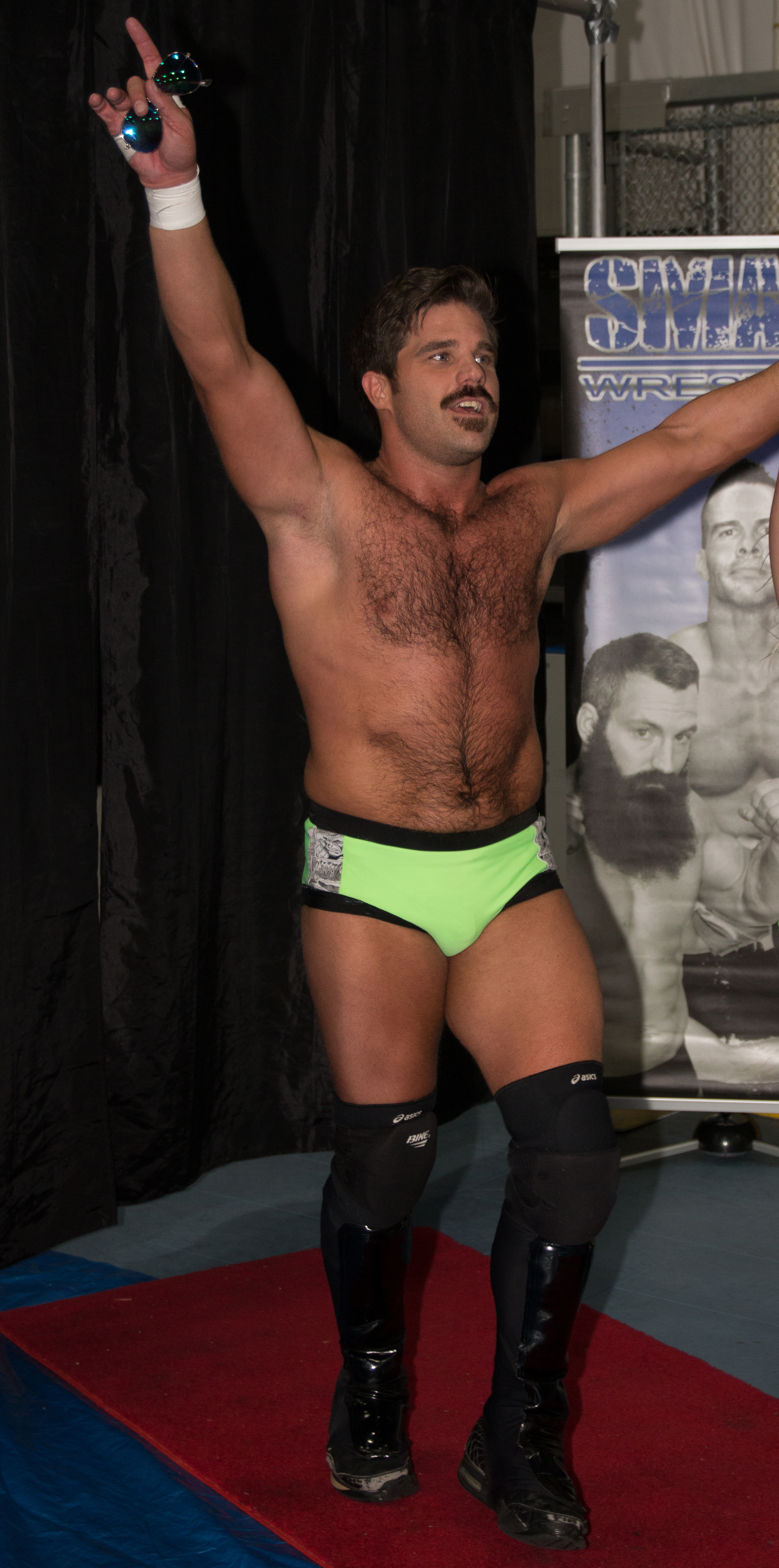
- The 2010 tournament winner Joey Ryan
- Promotion: Pro Wrestling Guerrilla
- Date: Night One: September 4, 2010; Night Two: September 5, 2010
- City: Reseda, Los Angeles, California
- Venue: American Legion Post #308
- Attendance: 900 (combined); Night One: 450; Night Two: 450

Event chronology
← Previous; Seven	Next → The Curse of Guerrilla Island

Battle of Los Angeles chronology
← Previous; 2009	Next → 2011

Battle of Los Angeles (2010) was the sixth Battle of Los Angeles professional wrestling tournament produced by Pro Wrestling Guerrilla (PWG). It was a two-night event held on September 4 and 5, 2010 at the American Legion Post #308 in Reseda, Los Angeles, California.

The tournament concluded with Joey Ryan defeating Chris Hero in the final. Aside from the tournament, several non-tournament matches took place at the event. At the first night, The Cutler Brothers (Brandon Cutler Dustin Cutler) defeated The Young Bucks (Matt Jackson and Nick Jackson) in a tag team match. On night two, ¡Peligro Abejas! (El Generico and Paul London) successfully defended the World Tag Team Championship against Cutler Brothers and The Fightin' Taylor Boys (Brian Cage, Chuck Taylor and Ryan Taylor) defeated Johnny Goodtime, Ricochet and Rocky Romero in a six-man tag team match. The event marked the PWG debut of Ricochet.

== Event ==
=== Night One ===
The 2010 Battle of Los Angeles tournament kicked off with a match between Matt Jackson and Nick Jackson, the two members of The Young Bucks, who interrupted the PWG commissioner Excalibur as he announced the tournament lineup in front of the live crowd. Bucks demanded that the referee Rick Knox count both of them out but Excalibur ordered them to compete because they needed to have a winner. Bucks responded by superkicking Knox and then a second referee Patrick Hernandez stepped in and disqualified both men. The Cutler Brothers (Brandon Cutler and Dustin Cutler) entered the ring to begin an immediate match against Young Bucks. Cutlers hit a double-team kneeling reverse piledriver to Matt for the win.

Next, Brandon Gatson took on Ryan Taylor. Gatson hit a corner splash and delivered a sit-out side powerslam to Taylor for the win.

Next, Joey Ryan took on Chuck Taylor. Ryan delivered That 70's Kick twice to Taylor for the win.

Next, Paul London took on Roderick Strong. Strong delivered a Death From Roderick and a seated big boot to London for the win.

Next, Ricochet made his PWG debut against Claudio Castagnoli. Castagnoli made Ricochet submit to the Neutralizer for the win.

Next, Austin Aries took on Rocky Romero. Aries powered out of a triangle choke by Romero and delivered a brainbuster to Romero for the win.

Next, Brandon Bonham took on Brian Cage. Bonham got a near-fall after performing a Hammer of the Gods on Cage and then Bonham executed a second Hammer of the Gods on Cage for the win.

Next, El Generico took on Akira Tozawa. Tozawa avoided a Brainbustaah!!! by Generico and delivered a German suplex for a near-fall before hitting a second German suplex for the win.

Next, Christopher Daniels took on Chris Hero. Hero countered a Last Rites by Daniels into a Hero's Welcome and then applied a dragon sleeper on Daniels to make him submit for the win.

=== Night Two ===
Quarterfinals

The second night of the tournament began with the quarterfinal round of the tournament. The first quarterfinal match pitted Austin Aries against Joey Ryan. Ryan delivered a That 70's Kick to Aries, who was about to perform an IED. Ryan followed by hitting another That 70's Kick to Aries for the win.

Next, Claudio Castagnoli took on Roderick Strong. Castagnoli hit a pop-up European uppercut to Strong for the win.

Next, Brandon Bonham took on Brandon Gatson. Gatson reversed a Hammer of the Gods attempt by Bonham into a near-fall and then hit a sit-out side powerslam to Bonham for the win.

Next, Chris Hero took on Akira Tozawa. Hero hit a running elbow smash and a moonsault on Tozawa for the win.

Semifinals

The semifinal round match between a match between Claudio Castagnoli and Joey Ryan. As Castagnoli tried to dive onto Ryan from the ropes, Ryan hit a mid-air That 70's Kick and followed it with a second That 70's Kick for the win.

In the second semifinal match, Chris Hero took on Brandon Gatson. Hero countered a handspring elbow by Gatson by hitting an elbow smash and then followed by hitting a Deathblow and applied a Stretch Plum Alpha on Gatson to make him submit for the win.

Non-tournament matches

Next, a six-man tag team match took place in which Brian Cage joined forces with Chuck Taylor and Ryan Taylor and changed his name to Brian Taylor, with the trio collectively known as Fightin' Taylor Boys. They took on the team of Johnny Goodtime, Ricochet and Rocky Romero. Chuck delivered an Awful Waffle to Ricochet to pick up the win for Fightin' Taylor Boys.

Next, ¡Peligro Abejas! defended the World Tag Team Championship against The Cutler Brothers. London hit a superkick on Dustin Cutler allowing Generico to deliver a Brainbustaah!!! to Dustin to win the match and retain the titles.

Final

The tournament final took place between Chris Hero and Joey Ryan. Ryan countered a rolling elbow attempt by Hero and pinned him with a small package to win the 2010 Battle of Los Angeles tournament.

== Reception ==
Ryan Rozanski of 411Mania rated the night one 7 out of 10, stating it "lengthy" with "enough quality matches to earn a slight recommendation". He stated that "the show started off with a hot opener and ended with an enjoyable main event." He considered Ricochet's debut against Claudio Castagnoli in the first round "the match of the night" while Austin Aries and Rocky Romero's match was "smartly-worked".

He heavily praised the night two as "a consistent show with worthwhile matches throughout the card". He rated it 8 out of 10. Rozanski appreciated Akira Tozawa for delivering "a star-making performance" against Chris Hero and praised the six-man tag team match featuring Fightin' Taylor Boys as an "energetic" contest. He gave mixed reviews to the last two matches which he believed "weren’t able to top expectations" and "there was definitely room for improvement".

== Aftermath ==
After winning the 2010 Battle of Los Angeles tournament, Joey Ryan was supposed to receive his title shot for the PWG World Championship but the champion Davey Richards vacated the title due to his outside commitments and was unable to compete in PWG for the rest of the year. As a result, at the following event, The Curse of the Guerrilla Island, a four-way match was set up for the vacant title between Joey Ryan, Chris Hero, Claudio Castagnoli and Brandon Gatson, the four semifinalists of the Battle of Los Angeles. Castagnoli won the vacant title.

However, Ryan remained entitled to a World Championship match which he earned due to his Battle of Los Angeles win. Ryan successfully defended his #1 contendership for the title against the Open Invitational Gauntlet winner Candice LeRae at the 2011 Dynamite Duumvirate Tag Team Title Tournament. Ryan subsequently cashed in his title shot against Claudio Castagnoli at Card Subject To Change III but failed to win.

The alliance which formed between Brian Cage, Chuck Taylor and Ryan Taylor would begin to be referred as Fightin' Taylor Boys and Cage's ring name was changed to Brian Cage-Taylor at The Curse of the Guerrilla Island. Cage used that name and remained a part of the trio until the 2012 Dynamite Duumvirate Tag Team Title Tournament. He then quietly left the group and reverted to using his Brian Cage ring name at Death To All But Metal.

== Results ==
Night 1 (September 4)
No.	Results	Stipulations	Times
1	Matt Jackson vs. Nick Jackson ended in a double disqualification	Singles match in the first round of Battle of Los Angeles tournament	—
2	The Cutler Brothers (Brandon Cutler and Dustin Cutler) defeated The Young Bucks (Matt Jackson and Nick Jackson)	Tag team match	12:28
3	Brandon Gatson defeated Ryan Taylor	Singles match in the first round of Battle of Los Angeles tournament	13:58
4	Joey Ryan defeated Chuck Taylor	Singles match in the first round of Battle of Los Angeles tournament	11:51
5	Roderick Strong defeated Paul London	Singles match in the first round of Battle of Los Angeles tournament	21:45
6	Claudio Castagnoli defeated Ricochet	Singles match in the first round of Battle of Los Angeles tournament	12:06
7	Austin Aries defeated Rocky Romero	Singles match in the first round of Battle of Los Angeles tournament	20:06
8	Brandon Bonham defeated Brian Cage	Singles match in the first round of Battle of Los Angeles tournament	14:30
9	Akira Tozawa defeated El Generico	Singles match in the first round of Battle of Los Angeles tournament	17:58
10	Chris Hero defeated Christopher Daniels	Singles match in the first round of Battle of Los Angeles tournament	18:18

Night 2 (September 5)
No.	Results	Stipulations	Times
1	Joey Ryan defeated Austin Aries	Singles match in the quarter-final round of Battle of Los Angeles tournament	15:26
2	Claudio Castagnoli defeated Roderick Strong	Singles match in the quarter-final round of Battle of Los Angeles tournament	13:50
3	Brandon Gatson defeated Brandon Bonham	Singles match in the quarter-final round of Battle of Los Angeles tournament	6:19
4	Chris Hero defeated Akira Tozawa	Singles match in the quarter-final round of Battle of Los Angeles tournament	13:54
5	Joey Ryan defeated Claudio Castagnoli	Singles match in the semi-final round of Battle of Los Angeles tournament	13:21
6	Chris Hero defeated Brandon Gatson	Singles match in the semi-final round of Battle of Los Angeles tournament	9:02
7	The Fightin' Taylor Boys (Brian Cage, Chuck Taylor and Ryan Taylor) defeated Johnny Goodtime, Ricochet and Rocky Romero	Six-man tag team match	20:13
8	¡Peligro Abejas! (El Generico and Paul London) (c) defeated The Cutler Brothers (Brandon Cutler and Dustin Cutler)	Tag team match for the PWG World Tag Team Championship	18:22
9	Joey Ryan defeated Chris Hero	Singles match in the Battle of Los Angeles tournament final	23:13
(c) / – the champion(s) heading into the match

=== Tournament brackets ===
Battle of Los Angeles (2010)
Tournament information
- Sport: Professional wrestling
- Location: Reseda, Los Angeles, California
- Dates: September 4, 2010–September 5, 2010
- Tournament format(s): Single elimination tournament
- Participants: 18

Final positions
- Champion: Joey Ryan
- Runner-up: Chris Hero

The tournament included eighteen participants, up from previous two years.

First round
Claudio Castagnoli	Sub
Ricochet	12:06
Paul London	Pin
Roderick Strong	21:45
Austin Aries	Pin
Rocky Romero	20:06
Joey Ryan	Pin
Chuck Taylor	11:51
Brandon Bonham	Pin
Brian Cage	14:30
Brandon Gatson	Pin
Ryan Taylor	13:58
El Generico	Pin
Akira Tozawa	17:58
Christopher Daniels	Sub
Chris Hero	18:18

Second round
Claudio Castagnoli	Pin
Roderick Strong	13:50
Austin Aries	Pin
Joey Ryan	15:26
Brandon Bonham	Pin
Brandon Gatson	6:19
Akira Tozawa	Pin
Chris Hero	13:54

Semifinals
Claudio Castagnoli	Pin
Joey Ryan	13:21
Brandon Gatson	Sub
Chris Hero	9:02

Finals
Joey Ryan	Pin
Chris Hero	23:13

First round
Matt Jackson	Double DQ
Nick Jackson
