= All Star Extravaganza VIII =

Professional wrestling pay-per-view event

- Promotion: Ring of Honor
- Date: September 30, 2016
- City: Lowell, Massachusetts
- Venue: Lowell Memorial Auditorium

Pay-per-view chronology
← Previous; Field of Honor (2016)	Next → Glory By Honor XV

All Star Extravaganza chronology
← Previous; All Star Extravaganza VII	Next → Last

All Star Extravaganza VIII was a professional wrestling pay-per-view event produced by Ring of Honor (ROH). It took place on September 30, 2016 at the Lowell Memorial Auditorium in Lowell, Massachusetts. Wrestlers from Mexico's Consejo Mundial de Lucha Libre (CMLL), and Japan's New Japan Pro-Wrestling (NJPW) also appeared on the card, as ROH has partnerships with both promotions.

This was the eighth event under the All Star Extravaganza chronology.

== Storylines ==
All Star Extravaganza VIII featured professional wrestling matches that involved wrestlers from pre-existing scripted feuds or storylines that played out on ROH's television program, Ring of Honor Wrestling. Wrestlers portrayed heroes (faces) or villains (heels) as they followed a series of events that built tension and culminated in a wrestling match or series of matches.

== Results ==
No.	Results	Stipulations	Times
1^{P}	Silas Young defeated Evil and Will Ferrara	Three-way match	—
2	Bobby Fish (c) defeated Donovan Dijak (with Prince Nana)	Singles match for the ROH World Television Championship	11:44
3	Colt Cabana and Dalton Castle defeated The All Night Express (Rhett Titus and Kenny King) (with Caprice Coleman), Keith Lee and Shane Taylor and War Machine (Hanson and Raymond Rowe)	Four Corner Survival tag team match for the #1 contendership to the ROH World Tag Team Championship	08:50
4	Dragon Lee defeated Kamaitachi	Singles match	16:06
5	Kyle O'Reilly defeated Hangman Page by submission	Singles match	09:51
6	A. C. H., Jay White and Kushida defeated Toru Yano and The Briscoes (Jay Briscoe and Mark Briscoe)	First round match in the ROH World Six-Man Tag Team Championship Tournament	14:11
7	Jay Lethal defeated Tetsuya Naito (with Evil)	Singles match	13:06
8	Adam Cole (c) defeated Michael Elgin	Singles match for the ROH World Championship	14:07
9	The Young Bucks (Matt Jackson and Nick Jackson) defeated The Addiction (Christopher Daniels and Frankie Kazarian) (c) and The Motor City Machine Guns (Alex Shelley and Chris Sabin)	Ladder War VI for the ROH World Tag Team Championship	23:45
(c) / – the champion(s) heading into the match; P / – the match was broadcast on the pre-show

== See also ==
- List of ROH pay-per-view events
- 2016 in professional wrestling
