= ROH Field of Honor =

- Promotions: Ring of Honor
- First event: Field of Honor (2014)
- Last event: Field of Honor (2016)

ROH Field of Honor is a professional wrestling pay-per-view (PPV) event promoted by Ring of Honor (ROH) promotion since 2014. The three events took place in August at MCU Park in Brooklyn, New York. After the broadcast of the events, it was put on sale on DVD and through their Video on demand.

It should not be confused with the Field of Honor tournament that Ring of Honor ran in 2003.

== Dates and venues ==
Event	Date	Venue	City	Main event
Field of Honor (2014)	August 12, 2014	MCU Park	Brooklyn, New York	Michael Elgin (c) vs. Adam Cole, AJ Styles and Jay Briscoe for the ROH World Championship
Field of Honor (2015)	August 22, 2015	MCU Park	Brooklyn, New York	Jay Lethal and Shinsuke Nakamura vs. reDRagon (Bobby Fish and Kyle O'Reilly)
Field of Honor (2016)	August 27, 2016	MCU Park	Brooklyn, New York	Adam Cole (c) vs. Jay Lethal, Hiroshi Tanahashi and Tetsuya Naito for the ROH World Championship
(c) – refers to the champion(s) heading into the match

== See also ==
- ROH's annual events
