= Roderick Strong =

American professional wrestler (born 1983)

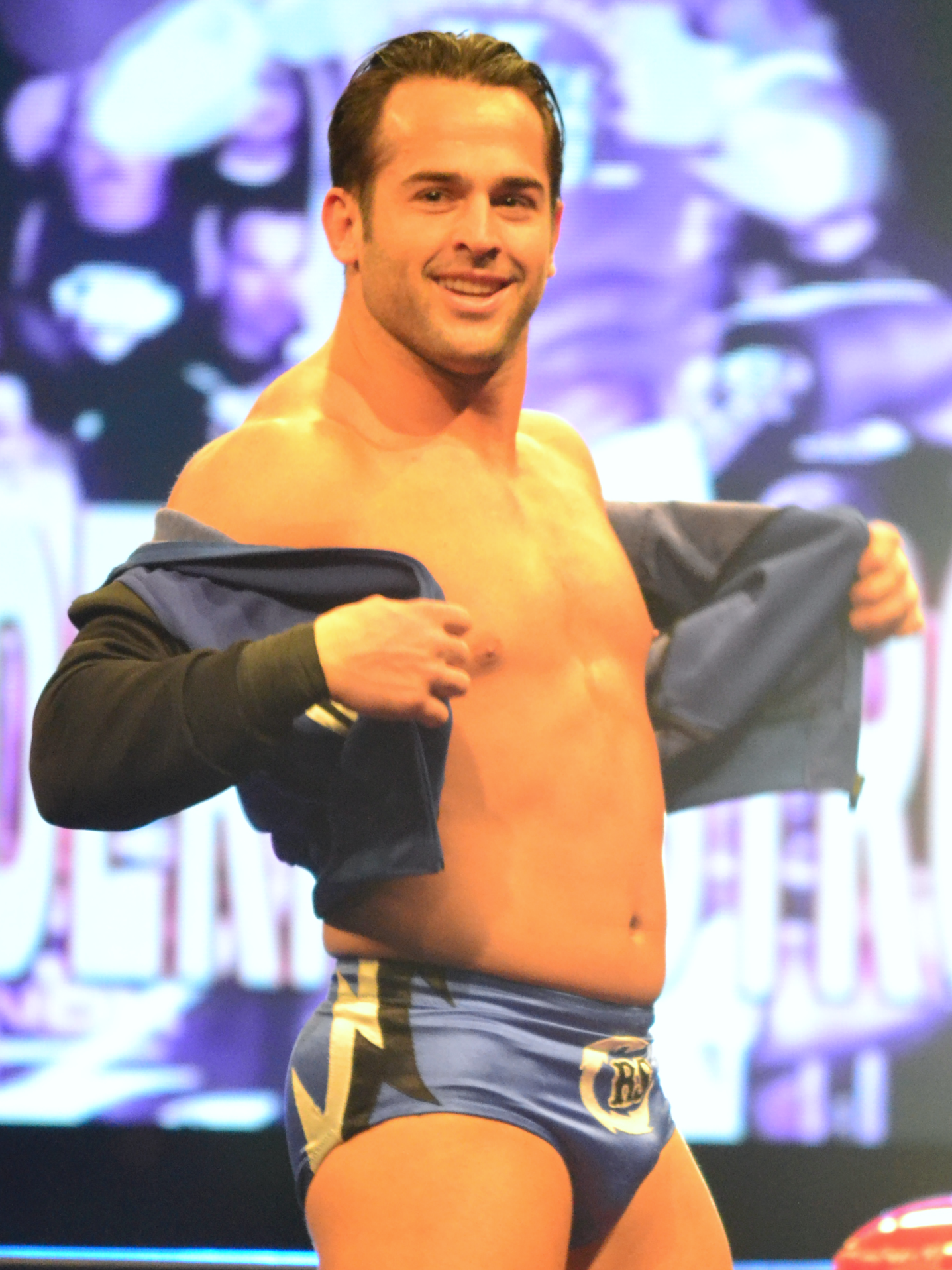
- Strong in 2016

Personal information
- Born: Christopher Lindsey; July 26, 1983 (age 43) Eau Claire, Wisconsin, U.S.
- Education: University of South Florida
- Spouse: Marina Shafir (m. 2018)
- Children: 1

Professional wrestling career
- Ring name(s): Roderick Strong; The Jester
- Billed height: 5 ft 10 in (178 cm)
- Billed weight: 200 lb (91 kg) or 205 lb
- Billed from: New Orleans, Louisiana; Tampa, Florida
- Trained by: Jim Neidhart; The Warlord; Prince Iaukea; Tim Mahoney
- Debut: March 24, 2000

Christopher Lindsey (born July 26, 1983), better known by his ring name Roderick Strong, is an American professional wrestler. As of April 2023, he is signed to All Elite Wrestling (AEW), where he is a member of The Conglomeration and The Paragon stables.

He is also known for his tenure with WWE, where he performed on the NXT brand. Prior to signing with WWE and later AEW, Strong had a 13-year tenure with Ring of Honor (ROH), where he is a former one-time ROH World Champion, a two-time ROH World Television Champion, and a one-time ROH World Tag Team Champion with Austin Aries, which made him the second-ever ROH Triple Crown Champion (after Eddie Edwards).

In 2000, he debuted on the Floridian independent circuit. He worked for IPW Hardcore and NWA Florida, before debuting for ROH in September 2003. In mid-2004, Strong joined forces with Alex Shelley, Austin Aries, and Jack Evans, collectively known as Generation Next. As part of Generation Next, Strong won the ROH World Tag Team Championship with Austin Aries. Strong later turned on Aries, forming a new faction, the No Remorse Corps, with Davey Richards and Rocky Romero. During this time, he was also competing for ROH's sister promotion, Full Impact Pro (FIP), and debuted for Pro Wrestling Guerrilla (PWG). Strong toured Japan with Dragon Gate and Pro Wrestling Noah and had a brief stint in Total Nonstop Action Wrestling (TNA) in 2005.

In FIP, he won the World Heavyweight Championship three times, and the Tag Team Championship twice, once with Erick Stevens and once with Rich Swann. In PWG, he is a one-time World Champion and a three-time World Tag Team Champion, having held the title with Davey Richards, Pac, and Jack Evans, respectively. In addition, he is the only wrestler to win PWG's annual Dynamite Duumvirate Tag Team Title Tournament with two different partners (Pac in 2007 and Jack Evans in 2008).

After signing with WWE in 2016, Strong debuted in NXT as a fan-favorite before turning into a villain and joining The Undisputed Era, where he became a two-time NXT Tag Team Champion (both with Kyle O'Reilly) and a one-time NXT North American Champion. As the leader of Diamond Mine, he became NXT Cruiserweight Champion once. In AEW, he is a former one-time AEW World Trios Champion with Conglomeration stablemates Orange Cassidy and Kyle O'Reilly.

== Early life ==
Lindsey was born in Eau Claire, Wisconsin, but relocated to Florida at a young age. Following a troubled childhood, Lindsey graduated from Riverview High School, where he played American football. He attended the University of South Florida on an academic scholarship. Lindsey majored in business for two years before dropping out.

== Professional wrestling career ==
=== Early career (2000–2005) ===
In the autumn of 1994, Lindsey's father, a collegiate wrestler, began training as a wrestler under Jim Neidhart. After Lindsey attended several training sessions and met Harry Smith, a third generation wrestler, he decided to become a wrestler. Lindsey was also trained by his father, Neidhart and a number of other wrestlers in Tampa, Florida, and debuted in 2000 as The Jester on the Floridian independent circuit for the RWA.

Strong wrestled his first match for the Independent Professional Wrestling promotion, competing in a twenty-man cruiserweight Battle royal. He was initially one-third of a stable known as "Risk Factor" with The Kamikaze Kid and Kid Lethal before he formed a tag team with his trainee and kayfabe brother, Sedrick Strong. The Strong Brothers defeated Wrongful Death (Naphtali and Dagon Briggs) for the IPW Tag Team Championship on June 28, 2002, in St. Petersburg, Florida. They held the title until September 20, when they lost to Naturally Marvelous (Scoot Andrews and Mike Sullivan) in a steel cage match in which Roderick suffered a concussion.

After Sedrick cost the Strong Brothers a number of matches, Roderick turned into a villain on February 8, 2003, betraying Sedrick and aligning himself with the Alliance of Defiance, a dominant villainous stable.

After IPW closed down in late 2003, Strong began working for NWA Florida, a promotion which had had a working relationship with IPW for two years. Strong defeated David Babylon for the Florida Unified Cruiserweight Championship on July 19, 2003, in St. Petersburg. While Strong was champion, the title was renamed the Florida Unified Junior Heavyweight Championship. He lost the title to Jerrelle Clark in a four-way match on December 13, 2003, in St. Petersburg. Clark vacated the title on January 10, 2004, after winning the NWA World Junior Heavyweight Championship, and Strong defeated Mikey Batts for the vacant title on February 21 in the New Alhambra Sports and Entertainment Center in Philadelphia, Pennsylvania. He lost the title to Sedrick Strong on April 29, 2004, in New Port Richey, Florida.

In addition to wrestling for NWA Florida, Strong served as the head trainer of the territory's wrestling school.

On January 13, 2005, Strong made a one-off appearance in World Wrestling Entertainment's SmackDown episode, representing Tampa. On the episode, Strong was defeated by Kurt Angle in Angle's "3-Minute Hometown Hero Challenge".

=== Ring of Honor (2003–2016) ===
==== Generation Next and No Remorse Corps (2003–2008) ====
Strong joined the Pennsylvania-based Ring of Honor (ROH) promotion in September 2003. On May 22, 2004, at Generation Next he formed a stable known as Generation Next with Alex Shelley, Austin Aries and Jack Evans. Generation Next quickly dominated the ROH roster, declaring themselves the future of wrestling. After defeating several others, they defeated CM Punk, Ace Steel, R. J. Brewer and Jimmy Jacobs (mentored by Ricky Steamboat) on October 2 at The Midnight Express Reunion.

Strong began punctuating his ring style with stiff offense while acting as the enforcer of Generation Next. In November 2004 he formed a regular tag team with Evans, and on December 26 he, Evans, and Aries threw Shelley out of the group when he refused to resign as leader. Strong and Evans continued to team throughout early-2005, but were unable to win the ROH Tag Team Championship. On September 24 at 2005 Survival of the Fittest, Strong defeated Samoa Joe, Jay Lethal, Generation Next teammate Austin Aries, and Colt Cabana to win the titular event, thus earning himself another shot at the ROH World Championship in the future.

On October 1 at Joe vs. Kobashi, valet Jade Chung aligned herself with Strong (and the remainder of Generation Next) after he defeated her former client, Jimmy Rave. The following night, Strong defeated James Gibson in the latter's farewell match for Ring of Honor before returning to World Wrestling Entertainment. Following the match, Gibson gave a farewell speech in which he called Strong the "MVP" of Ring of Honor.

Strong lost to ROH World Champion Bryan Danielson on October 29 in Woodbridge, Connecticut, and on November 5 in Chicago, with the match going over 45 minutes. On March 31 in Chicago, Strong faced Bryan Danielson a third time for the ROH World Championship, with a 60-minute time limit, but Roderick came up short with Danielson rolling up Strong at the 56 minute mark for the victory.

At Final Battle 2005 on December 17, 2005, Strong and Aries defeated Sal Rinauro and Tony Mamaluke to win the ROH World Tag Team Championship. They held the titles until September 16, 2006, when they were defeated by The Kings of Wrestling (Chris Hero and Claudio Castagnoli). In February 2007, Strong turned on Aries to form a new faction with Davey Richards called the No Remorse Corps.

The No Remorse Corps went on to feud with Aries' new faction The Resilience. Rocky Romero joined the NRC, while Matt Cross and Erick Stevens joined The Resilience. Though the NRC dominated the feud for the most part, the feud's end came with Strong losing matches to Aries at both Undeniable and Reckless Abandon in a 30-minute Iron Man match.

Strong then began to feud with Stevens over the FIP title. Strong lost the title to Stevens at Final Battle 2007, but won it back at FIP Redefined. He continued to hold onto the belt in several matches with Stevens, and won a Fight Without Honor against Stevens at ROH Respect is Earned II by superplexing Stevens off a ladder through two tables. However, he lost the FIP title to Stevens at FIP Hot Summer Nights 2008 in a Dog Collar match to end their feud. At Respect is Earned II, Davey Richards turned on Strong to join Sweet and Sour Inc.

==== Championship reigns (2008–2013) ====
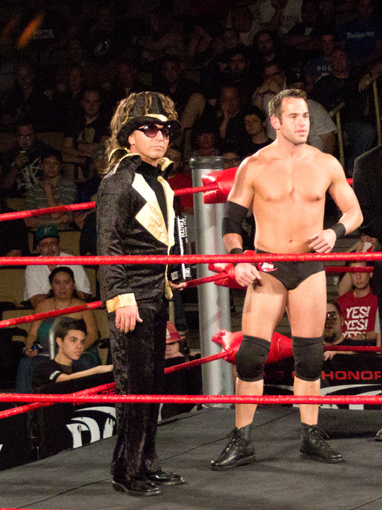
Strong with his manager Truth Martini

On an episode of ROH on HDNet, Strong was chosen as a judge for the Tyler Black/Austin Aries match for the ROH World Title on February 13. Strong accepted the position as Black promised that, should he win the title, Strong will be given a championship match.

On May 22, 2010, Strong turned into a villain and debuted Truth Martini as his new manager. At the following pay-per-view, Death Before Dishonor VIII, on June 19, Strong defeated Colt Cabana, Steve Corino, Shawn Daivari, Tyson Dux and Eddie Edwards in a gauntlet match, with an assist from Martini, to earn the right to challenge for the ROH World Championship. On September 11, 2010, at Glory By Honor IX, Strong defeated Tyler Black in a No Disqualification match to win the ROH World Championship for the first time. He then took a brief leave of absence from ROH to travel to Pro Wrestling Noah with ROH World Television Champion Eddie Edwards to participate in the Nippon Television Junior Heavyweight Tag League. On March 2, 2011, ROH announced that Strong had signed a new contract with the promotion. Just over two weeks later, on March 19, Strong lost the ROH World Championship to Eddie Edwards at Manhattan Mayhem IV.

On April 1 at Honor Takes Center Stage, Strong faced Richards once again in a rematch from their encounter at Final Battle. This time, Richards defeated Strong after making him submit to an Ankle Lock. The following night, on the second night of the iPPV, Strong lost again, this time to El Generico. After the match, Strong's teammate from the House of Truth, Michael Elgin, attacked Generico until Colt Cabana made the save. Christopher Daniels also came out, presumably to assist fellow babyfaces Cabana and Generico, but turned heel after hitting Generico with the Book of Truth and hitting Cabana with the Angel's Wings, thus joining the House of Truth. On August 13 at the first ever TV tapings of Ring Of Honor Wrestling under Sinclair Broadcasting Group, Strong received another shot at the ROH world title against Davey Richards but was unsuccessful. On March 31, 2012, at Showdown in the Sun, Strong defeated Jay Lethal to win the ROH World Television Championship for the first time, in the process becoming the second person to win the ROH Triple Crown. On June 29, Strong lost the title to Adam Cole. After defeating former stablemate Michael Elgin on December 16 at Final Battle 2012: Doomsday, Strong quit the House of Truth. On March 2, 2013, at the 11th Anniversary Show, Strong would end his feud with Elgin, being defeated in a Two out of three falls match.

==== Various feuds and departure (2013–2016) ====
Strong in September 2013

Throughout 2013, Strong won numerous singles matches and in mid-2013, began a friendly rivalry with Adam Cole with both men trading victories. After the ROH World Championship was vacated, Strong entered a tournament to determine the new champion as a face, defeating Matt Taven in his first round match on August 3. On August 17, Strong was eliminated from the tournament in the second round by Kevin Steen. On October 5, Strong challenged tournament winner and ROH World Champion, Adam Cole, in a No Disqualification, No Count Out match, but would come up short. In late 2013, Strong would dub the name "Mr. Ring of Honor" for his consistent stint in ROH. On December 14, 2013, at Final Battle 2013, Roderick Strong would turn into a villain with B. J. Whitmer and Jimmy Jacobs, by attacking Eddie Edwards, citing that they were sick of people being celebrated when they walk out of ROH, while the constants in ROH would go unappreciated. This villainous group is known as The Decade.

On January 4, 2014, Strong was defeated by the returning A.J. Styles. Throughout 2014, Strong was ousted from The Decade after falling out with Adam Page, Strong then fended off an attack from Page and Whitmer to set up a match for Final Battle, and as a result. Strong defeated Adam Page at Final Battle 2014, and then B. J. Whitmer in a grudge match at ROH's 13th Anniversary Show to end his feud with The Decade.

Strong would go on to appear on the lower card for the first few months of 2015, defeating Christopher Daniels at Supercard of Honor IX. Along with the rest of the ROH roster, Roderick Strong was involved with the Ring of Honor and New Japan Pro-Wrestling collaborated events War of the Worlds, held on May 12 and 13; and Global Wars held on May 15 and 16. At the first War of the Worlds event, Strong won his match with NJPW wrestler Kushida, but lost his match at the second event to NJPW mainstay Hiroshi Tanahashi, considered one of the top three stars of New Japan. He appeared at both Global Wars events; on the first night, he teamed with the Briscoes and War Machine (Hanson and Ray Rowe) to defeat Bullet Club (A. J. Styles (then IWGP Heavyweight Champion), Doc Gallows, Karl Anderson, and the Young Bucks). On the second night, he lost to Shinsuke Nakamura, another one of the top three stars of NJPW. After the ROH/NJPW events, Strong garnered high praise from wrestling journalist Dave Meltzer, reporting that both Tanahashi and Nakamura were giving him "rave reviews".

Following the ROH/NJPW events, Strong set his sights on the ROH World Championship. At Best in the World, Strong defeated Michael Elgin and Moose in a three-way match to become the number one contender to the ROH World Championship. Strong received his title match at Death Before Dishonor XIII, challenging Jay Lethal (also the ROH World Television Champion), but was unsuccessful as the match went to a 60-minute time-limit draw. After failing to capture the title, Roderick Strong began campaigning for a match against IWGP Heavyweight Champion Kazuchika Okada, the only one of the top three NJPW talents (alongside Hiroshi Tanahashi and Shinsuke Nakamura) he had yet to wrestle. Okada accepted the challenge, setting the two up for a match at Field of Honor, where Okada was victorious. Strong finally received a rematch with Lethal for the ROH World Championship on the August 21 episode of ROH Wrestling, but was defeated. Strong continued to be unsuccessful in his endeavours, as he lost a number one contenders match at All Star Extravaganza VII, losing to A. J. Styles in a four-way match (along with Adam Cole and Michael Elgin). Despite his recent misfortunes, Strong continued to feud with Jay Lethal, where he was announced as being the partner of A. J. Styles and ACH in a "Champions vs. All-Stars" elimination match at Glory By Honor XIV against Lethal and ROH World Tag Team Champions The Kingdom (Matt Taven and Michael Bennett). In the lead-up to the match, Strong earned a match for Jay Lethal's ROH World Television Championship on the first night of Glory By Honor XIV on October 23. Strong was successful in the match, capturing the TV title for the second time. Being a champion, Strong was placed on the Champions team with Lethal and the Kingdom against the new All-Stars team (after Styles and ACH had both been injured the previous night), turning the six-man tag team match into an eight-man tag team match. Strong's team was victorious, with Strong and Lethal being the only two remaining in the match. After the match, Strong had a stare-down with both Styles and Lethal.

After being injured during the Survival of the Fittest tournament, Strong issued an open challenge for the upcoming Final Battle pay-per-view event, which was accepted by Bobby Fish, who had defeated him in a match on September 12. On December 18, the first night of the event, Strong retained the title against Fish. During the match Strong submitted to Fish, but the referee did not see, and the match continued. Strong once more turned into a villain after hitting Fish with a Sick Kick to win. The following night, Strong solidified his villainous turn by defeating ECW alumni Stevie Richards.

Heading into 2016, Roderick Strong continued to feud with Bobby Fish, where the two were scheduled for a rematch for Strong's TV Championship at ROH's 14th Anniversary event on February 26. However Strong lost the ROH World Television Championship to New Japan Pro-Wrestling's Tomohiro Ishii at the ROH/NJPW co-produced Honor Rising: Japan 2016 event in Tokyo's Korakuen Hall. He then went on to be pinned by Ishii in a three-way match at ROH 14th Anniversary, which also involved Fish. Strong was then defeated May 8 by Dalton Castle, who became the new number-one contender to the TV title.

On June 22, 2016, ROH announced that Strong would be leaving the promotion following the June 25 television tapings. June 24 at Best in the World '16 Roderick Strong lost to Mark Briscoe after a pair of fisherman suplex drivers/brainbusters. The following day, June 25, his last day at ROH, Strong was defeated again by Dalton Castle, who had just lost his TV title challenge against Bobby Fish at Best in the World. Although taped in June it did not air until July 15. On that day, he said that he will always be known as "Mr. ROH".

=== Full Impact Pro (2004–2015) ===
Roderick Strong made his Full Impact Pro (FIP) debut in 2004 against Austin Aries. On November 10, 2006, in Inverness, Florida, Strong defeated Bryan Danielson in a title-versus-career match to win the FIP Heavyweight Championship, the heavyweight championship of the Floridian Full Impact Pro promotion. When he defended the title against Pac in Liverpool on March 3, the FIP Heavyweight championship became known as the FIP World Heavyweight Championship. On December 6, 2013, Strong and Rich Swann defeated The Bravado Brothers (Harlem and Lancelot) to win the FIP Tag Team Championship. Next day, at Violence is the Answer, they retained the title against Andrew Everett and Caleb Konley. On May 2, 2014, Strong and Swann lost the FIP Tag Team Championship to The Juicy Product. On February 20, 2015, Strong won the FIP World Heavyweight Championship for the third time. He lost the title to Rich Swann on April 18.

=== Total Nonstop Action Wrestling (2005–2006) ===
In his first major appearance with Total Nonstop Action Wrestling, Strong lost a special "Showcase Match" to Austin Aries at the Unbreakable pay-per-view on September 11, 2005. On September 22, it was announced that he had signed a contract with TNA, and would wrestle A.J. Styles in the opening match on the premiere episode of TNA Impact! on Spike TV on October 1. Strong went on to lose the subsequent bout. At Bound for Glory, Strong competed in a Fatal 4-way match on the preshow which was won by Sonjay Dutt. on the October 29 episode of Impact, Strong and Alex Shelley lost to A.J. Styles and Sonjay Dutt. At Genesis, Strong competed in an Eight-man tag team elimination match which his team won. At Turning Point, Strong and Alex Shelley lost to Austin Aries and Matt Bentley. On December 3 Strong lost to Matt Bentley in a match taped for Xplosion. on the December 31 episode of Impact, Strong lost to Samoa Joe.

In 2006, he formed a stable in TNA with Austin Aries and Alex Shelley and at Final Resolution they defeated Chris Sabin, Matt Bentley and Sonjay Dutt in a Six-man tag team match. on the January 7 episode of Impact, Strong, Austin Aries and Alex Shelley defeated A.J. Styles, Christopher Daniels and Chris Sabin in a six man tag team match. on the February 4 episode of Impact, Strong and Aries defeated The Naturals in a #1 Contenders Tournament match. on the February 11 episode of Impact, Strong and Aries lost to Sonjay Dutt and Chris Sabin in the Tournament final. At Against All Odds, Strong and Austin Aries lost to The Naturals (Andy Douglas and Chase Stevens). on the February 18 episode of Impact, Strong competed in a 3-WAY to Qualify for Team USA for TNA's world cup but lost the match. on the February 25 episode of Impact, Strong lost to A.J. Styles.

In February 2006, he and Aries were both suspended for two months for arriving four hours late for the pay-per-view TNA Against All Odds 2006. He returned to TNA in April 2006, but was released shortly thereafter with his final TNA match being on the April 8 episode of Impact where he lost a World X Cup Three Way Qualifying Match which was won by Alex Shelley.

=== Japan (2005–2013) ===
Strong has made several tours of Japan, starting in December 2005 with Dragon Gate. Since 2009 he has worked for Pro Wrestling Noah, where, in July 2013, he and Slex entered in the NTV G+ Cup Junior Heavyweight Tag League for the vacant GHC Junior Heavyweight Tag Team Championship. However, the team won only two points and failed to advance in the tournament.

=== Pro Wrestling Guerrilla (2005–2016; 2023) ===
==== World Tag Team Champion (2005–2008) ====
Strong made his Pro Wrestling Guerrilla (PWG) debut on February 12, 2005, losing to Ricky Reyes. On December 16, Strong and Jack Evans defeated 2 Skinny Black Guys (El Generico and Human Tornado) to become number one contenders to the PWG World Tag Team Championship. They challenged champions Super Dragon and Davey Richards on March 4, 2006, in a losing effort. Throughout 2006, Strong won numerous singles matches and made his Battle of Los Angeles tournament debut. He defeated Rocky Romero in the opening and Dragon Kid in the quarterfinal rounds before losing to Davey Richards, the eventual winner, in the semifinals. On November 17, Strong teamed with Richards to defeat Super Dragon and B-Boy for the PWG World Tag Team Championship; however, Super Dragon and B-Boy regained the titles the following day.

Strong would win his second World Tag Team Championship at the inaugural Dynamite Duumvirate Tag Team Title Tournament, held over two nights in May 2007. Originally, Strong was scheduled to team with Evans, but Evans was unable to appear. Strong instead teamed with British wrestler PAC, defeating Richards and Super Dragon, the Muscle Outlaw'z (Naruki Doi and Masato Yoshino) and the Briscoe Brothers (Jay and Mark Briscoe), respectively, to win the tournament and titles. On July 26, they lost the titles to Kevin Steen and El Generico. A month later, Strong entered the 2007 Battle of Los Angeles, this time defeating Austin Aries, Joey Ryan, and Alex Shelley on his way to the finals, where he was eliminated by CIMA in a match also involving El Generico.

On February 24, 2008, Strong took part in a one-night tournament to determine a new PWG World Champion. The previous champion, Low Ki, had gotten injured, forcing him to vacate. Strong was supposed to face Low Ki for the title, and thus was given a bye into the final round. The tournament (dubbed ¡Dia de los Dangerous!) final saw Strong wrestle Human Tornado and Karl Anderson in a three-way match, which Strong lost. On May 17 and 18, he entered the second annual DDT4 with Evans. They went on to defeat the teams of Scorpio Sky and Ronin and Los Luchas (Phoenix Star and Zokre) on their way to the finals, where they beat the World Tag Team Champions Kevin Steen and El Generico to become champions and tournament winners. On July 6 at Life During Wartime, The Age of the Fall (Tyler Black and Jimmy Jacobs) defeated the team of Generico (substituting for Evans) and Strong to win the titles. The next month, Strong beat Tyler Black in singles action. He entered his third Battle of Los Angeles and was eliminated in the first round by eventual winner Low Ki.

==== Championship pursuits (2009–2011) ====
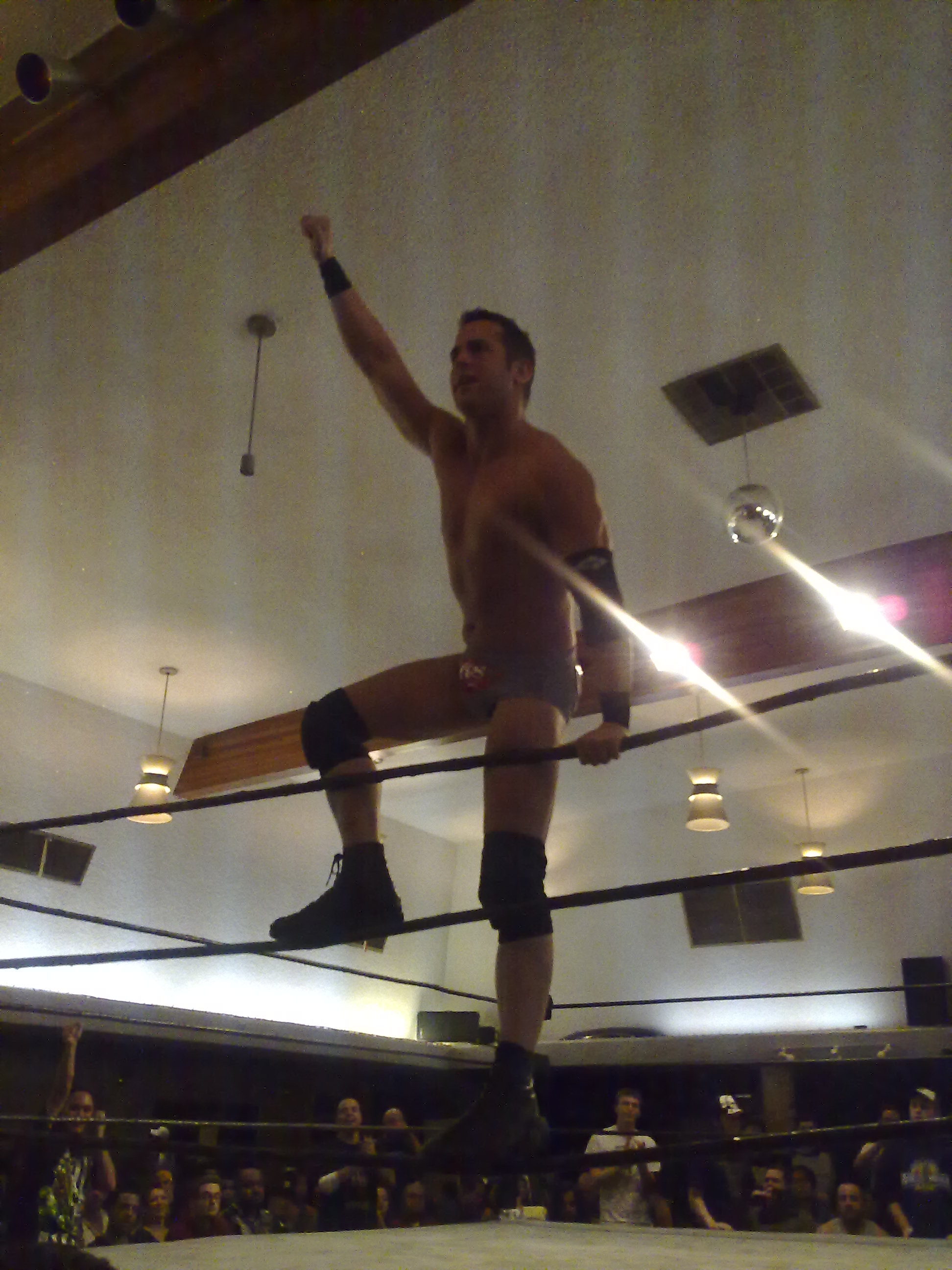
Strong making his entrance at PWG's 2009 Battle of Los Angeles

At the 2009 DDT4 on May 22, Strong teamed with Bryan Danielson to make it to the final round for a third year in a row. They beat The Dynasty (Scott Lost and Joey Ryan) and the Motor City Machine Guns (Shelley and Chris Sabin) before losing to World Tag Team Champions The Young Bucks (Matt and Nick Jackson). Strong received his second PWG World Championship title shot on August 28, 2009, challenging Chris Hero, but was unable to win. That year, he also again made it to the final round of Battle of Los Angeles, losing the potential victory and vacant World Championship to Kenny Omega.

On January 30, 2010, Strong wrestled Hero and Rob Van Dam in a three-way match at PWG's WrestleReunion 4 showcase. On April 10, he faced Richards for the World Championship, but went on to lose. On May 9, Strong was unable to make it to the DDT4 finals, losing in the opening round. At Seven on July 30, Strong was beaten by Danielson in a singles match. He entered the 2010 Battle of Los Angeles and beat Paul London in the opening round before losing to Claudio Castagnoli the next day. At All Star Weekend 8 – Night Two on May 28, 2011, Strong and former partner Aries lost a World Tag Team Championship title match against The Young Bucks. Strong entered the 2011 Battle of Los Angeles and was eliminated by Eddie Edwards in the opening round. On December 10, Strong defeated the debuting Amazing Red.

==== The Dojo Bros (2012–2013) ====
On April 21, 2012, Strong teamed with PWG debutant Sami Callihan at DDT4, but again lost before making it to the semifinals. He entered his seventh consecutive Battle of Los Angeles in September, beating Drake Younger in the opening round and losing to Ricochet in the quarterfinals. At Failure to Communicate on October 27, Strong defeated the debuting Rich Swann. At the inaugural Mystery Vortex, which took place on December 1, Strong teamed with Eddie Edwards and earned back-to-back tag team victories; the duo first defeated The Young Bucks in the opening match, then beat World Tag Team Champions Super Smash Brothers (Player Uno and Stupefied) in a non-title bout.

==== PWG World Champion and Mount Rushmore (2014–2016) ====
At PWG's eleventh anniversary show, Strong defeated Adam Cole to become the #1 contender for the PWG World Championship which was held by Kyle O'Reilly. After congratulating O'Reilly for his successful title defense over Chris Hero, he then attacked O'Reilly turning heel once again. He later justified his turn by claiming he was "tired of being the guy who has the great matches" and he was tired of being "the gatekeeper of PWG." In August, Strong would enter the 2014 Battle of Los Angeles, defeating Biff Busick in the first round, and would make it to the finals albeit through cheating; getting a disqualification win over A.J. Styles and getting a bye over Kyle O'Reilly in the semifinals after attacking him before the match. The three-way final match, which also included Johnny Gargano, was won by Ricochet. At Untitled II, Strong unsuccessfully challenged O'Reilly for the title.

At Black Cole Sun, Strong defeated O'Reilly in a Guerrilla Warfare match to win the PWG World Championship for the first time after goading O'Reilly into a match after O'Reilly defeated BOLA winner Ricochet in a near thirty-minute match. Strong successfully defended the title against Trevor Lee at From Out of Nowhere, Zack Sabre Jr. at Don't Sweat the Technique and Brian Cage and Chris Hero in a three-way match at 2015 DDT. At Mystery Vortex III, Strong successfully defended the title against "Speedball" Mike Bailey in an open challenge and later helped The Young Bucks capture the PWG World Tag Team Championship and afterwards formed a new version of the Mount Rushmore stable with them and the returning Super Dragon. On December 11, Adam Cole joined the stable.

On March 5, 2016, Strong lost the PWG World Championship to Zack Sabre Jr. He would later cash in his rematch clause against Sabre at Thirteen on July 29, 2016, and lose. He followed the match with a farewell speech to signal his departure from PWG after eleven years with the promotion.

==== One night return (2023) ====
Strong made his first PWG appearance since July 2016 at Twenty: Mystery Vortex on August 13, 2023, where he defeated Michael Oku.

=== WWE (2016–2022) ===
==== NXT Championship pursuits (2016–2018) ====
Strong made his NXT debut on the October 19, 2016, episode of NXT as Austin Aries' partner in the second Dusty Rhodes Tag Team Classic tournament, defeating Otis Dozovic and Tucker Knight. On October 25, 2016, WWE officially announced Strong as part of the latest group of recruits joining the WWE Performance Center. On the December 14 episode of NXT, Strong defeated Elias Samson, in doing so getting himself entered into a fatal four-way match to determine a new number one contender for the NXT Championship as well as establishing himself as a fan favorite. Strong competed in the fatal-four way on the December 21 episode of NXT, but was unsuccessful. Strong defeated Andrade "Cien" Almas at NXT TakeOver: San Antonio in his first TakeOver appearance. Strong then began a rivalry with the faction SAnitY after coming to the aid of Tye Dillinger and No Way Jose, who were also battling the group. At NXT TakeOver: Orlando, Strong teamed with Dillinger, Ruby Riot and Kassius Ohno (replacing No Way Jose who had been attacked earlier in the night) to take on SAnitY in an 8-person mixed tag team match in a losing effort. On May 20, at NXT TakeOver: Chicago, Strong defeated Eric Young, giving Young his first pinfall loss in NXT. On the July 5 episode of NXT, Strong challenged Bobby Roode for the NXT Championship, but lost the match. After Drew McIntyre won the NXT Championship from Roode at NXT TakeOver: Brooklyn III, Strong defeated Roode on the August 30 episode of NXT. Strong unsuccessfully challenged McIntyre for the NXT Championship on the October 5 episode of NXT. Strong was defeated by Almas on the October 25 episode of NXT following interference from Zelina Vega.

Strong entered a storyline with The Undisputed Era (Adam Cole, Bobby Fish, and Kyle O'Reilly). For weeks, the trio tried to recruit Strong to join the group in an attempt to overtake NXT. During a match between SAnitY and The Authors of Pain on the November 1 episode of NXT, The Undisputed Era interfered and caused the match to end in a no-contest. Strong entered the fray and pulled out an Undisputed Era armband, seemingly joining the group. However, Strong attacked the three, and cleared the ring alongside The Authors of Pain. General manager William Regal emerged on the ramp, and announced a WarGames match for NXT TakeOver: WarGames (originally known as TakeOver: Houston). Strong would team with The Authors of Pain against The Undisputed Era and SAnitY. At the event, Strong (who dressed in a similar attire to his teammates) and The Authors of Pain were unsuccessful in winning. On the December 20 episode of NXT, Strong was defeated by Lars Sullivan in a qualifying match for a number one contender's fatal four-way match for the NXT Championship.

On the January 30, 2018, episode of 205 Live, 205 Live General Manager Drake Maverick announced the 2018 WWE Cruiserweight Championship Tournament. Strong was later announced as a participant in the tournament, in which he would defeat Hideo Itami in the first round and Kalisto in the quarter-finals on the February 6 and February 27 episodes of 205 Live before being defeated by Cedric Alexander in the semi-finals on the March 13 episode of 205 Live.

==== The Undisputed Era (2018–2021) ====
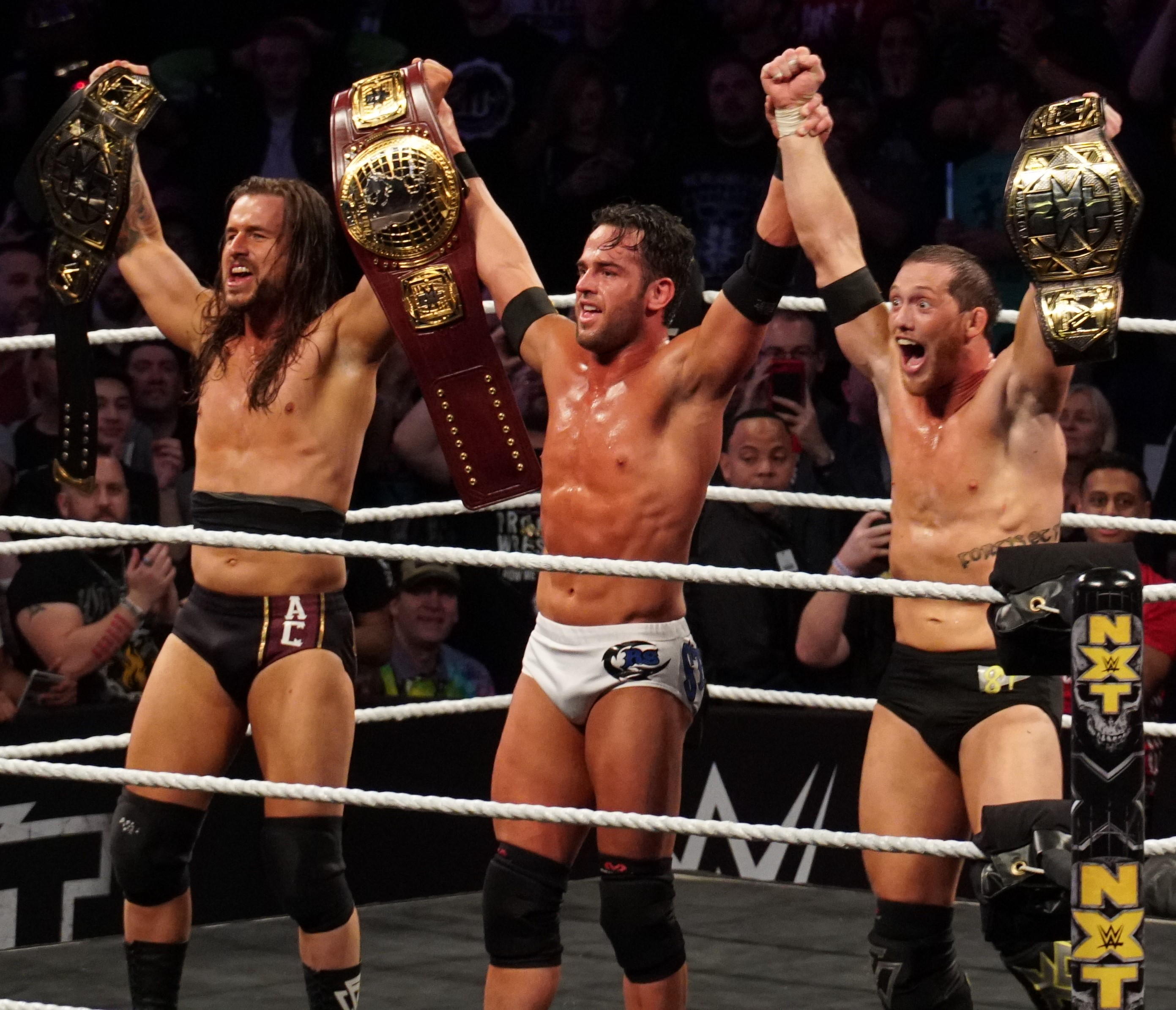
Strong (center) after joining The Undisputed Era at NXT TakeOver: New Orleans

At NXT TakeOver: New Orleans, during the triple threat match for the NXT Tag Team Championship and the Dusty Rhodes Tag Team Classic trophy, Strong turned on his partner Pete Dunne and joined The Undisputed Era, turning heel. The next morning at WrestleMania Axxess, Strong teamed with O'Reilly to defend the NXT Tag Team Championship, making him one of the champions via the Freebird Rule. At the Greatest Royal Rumble, Strong competed in the namesake match, entering at #34 and eliminating Rhyno before being eliminated by Baron Corbin.

At NXT TakeOver: Chicago II, O'Reilly and Strong defeated Danny Burch and Oney Lorcan to retain the NXT Tag Team Championship. On day 2 of the 2018 WWE United Kingdom Championship Tournament, O'Reilly and Strong lost the NXT Tag Team Championship against Moustache Mountain (Tyler Bate and Trent Seven). However, they would regain the championships on the July 11, 2018, episode of NXT, after Bate threw in the towel over an injured Seven. At NXT TakeOver: Brooklyn 4 on August 18, O'Reilly and Strong defeated Moustache Mountain again to retain the titles. All four members of the Undisputed Era competed in a WarGames match at NXT TakeOver: Wargames II on November 17 against Ricochet, Pete Dunne, War Machine (Rowe, and Hanson), in a losing effort.

At NXT TakeOver: Phoenix on January 26, 2019, Strong and O'Reilly lost the NXT Tag Team Championship to the War Raiders, ending their reign at 219 days. At NXT TakeOver: New York on April 5, Strong interfered in Adam Cole's NXT Championship match against Johnny Gargano. Afterwards, Strong would begin a feud with Matt Riddle. At NXT TakeOver: XXV on June 1, Strong was defeated by Riddle. On August 10 at NXT TakeOver: Toronto, Strong competed in a triple threat match against Pete Dunne and Velveteen Dream for the NXT North American Championship, which Dream won to retain the title.

On September 18 during the debut episode of NXT on the USA Network, Strong defeated Velveteen Dream after interference from the Undisputed Era to win the NXT North American Championship, giving him his first single title in WWE, and giving the Undisputed Era all three male championships available in NXT. He would then, alongside the Undisputed Era, begin a feud against Tommaso Ciampa, Riddle, and Keith Lee which would lead to a WarGames match at NXT TakeOver: WarGames, in which the Undisputed Era lost to the team of Ciampa, Lee, Dominik Dijakovic, and Kevin Owens. The next night at Survivor Series, he then defeated SmackDown's Intercontinental Champion Shinsuke Nakamura and Raw's United States Champion A.J. Styles in an inter-brand triple threat match. On the December 25 episode of NXT, Strong would defeat Austin Theory to retain his NXT North American Title. At NXT Worlds Collide, Strong and the rest of The Undisputed Era would face Imperium but would lose the match. On the January 22, 2020, episode of NXT, Strong lost the North American Championship to Keith Lee in the main event, ending his reign at 126 days.

Strong then began feuding with Dexter Lumis, who came to Velveteen Dream's aid to help him in his war with The Undisputed Era. During that time, Dexter kidnapped Strong during the In Your House event to keep him from interfering in Cole's match with Dream. Though returned to his allies, Strong was heavily traumatized by the kidnapping and developed a deathly fear of Dexter as a result. His teammates attempted to curtail his sudden panic and fear by having him go to therapy but his therapist was O'Reilly in disguise, due to Cole's paranoia that Strong might renounce villainy as a result of his encounter with Dexter. At The Great American Bash, Strong lost to Lumis in a strap match. In September, The Undisputed Era started a feud with Pat McAfee, Oney Lorcan, Danny Burch, and Pete Dunne, turning them face in the process. This culminated at NXT TakeOver: WarGames (2020) in a WarGames match with the Undisputed Era winning.

At NXT TakeOver: Vengeance Day, Cole superkicked O'Reilly, leaving the future of the faction in uncertainty. On the February 24, 2021, episode of NXT, Cole turned on and double-crossed Strong, thus disbanding The Undisputed Era. After the dissolution of The Undisputed Era, Strong took time off from NXT.

==== Diamond Mine (2021–2022) ====
Strong made his return on June 22 episode of NXT, attacking Kushida, and formed the Diamond Mine stable along with Tyler Rust (who was released weeks after and later replaced by Creed Brothers and Ivy Nile) and Hachiman, with Malcolm Bivens as their manager, turning heel once again. On the September 21 episode of NXT 2.0, Strong defeated Kushida to win the NXT Cruiserweight Championship. At NXT WarGames, Strong defeated Joe Gacy, retaining his championship. On the NXT: New Year's Evil, he lost the title to Carmelo Hayes, unifying both North American and Cruiserweight Championships.

Strong and the rest of Diamond Mine would slowly turn face at the start of 2022, when they entered a feud with Imperium. In September, Strong suffered an ankle injury and was written off television. Strong's final on-screen appearance in WWE was on the October 11 episode of NXT, where he motivated Julius Creed ahead of his Ambulance Match with Damon Kemp at Halloween Havoc. In November, Strong's contract with WWE expired and he quietly departed the company.

=== All Elite Wrestling / Return to ROH (2023–present) ===
==== Undisputed Kingdom (2023–2025) ====
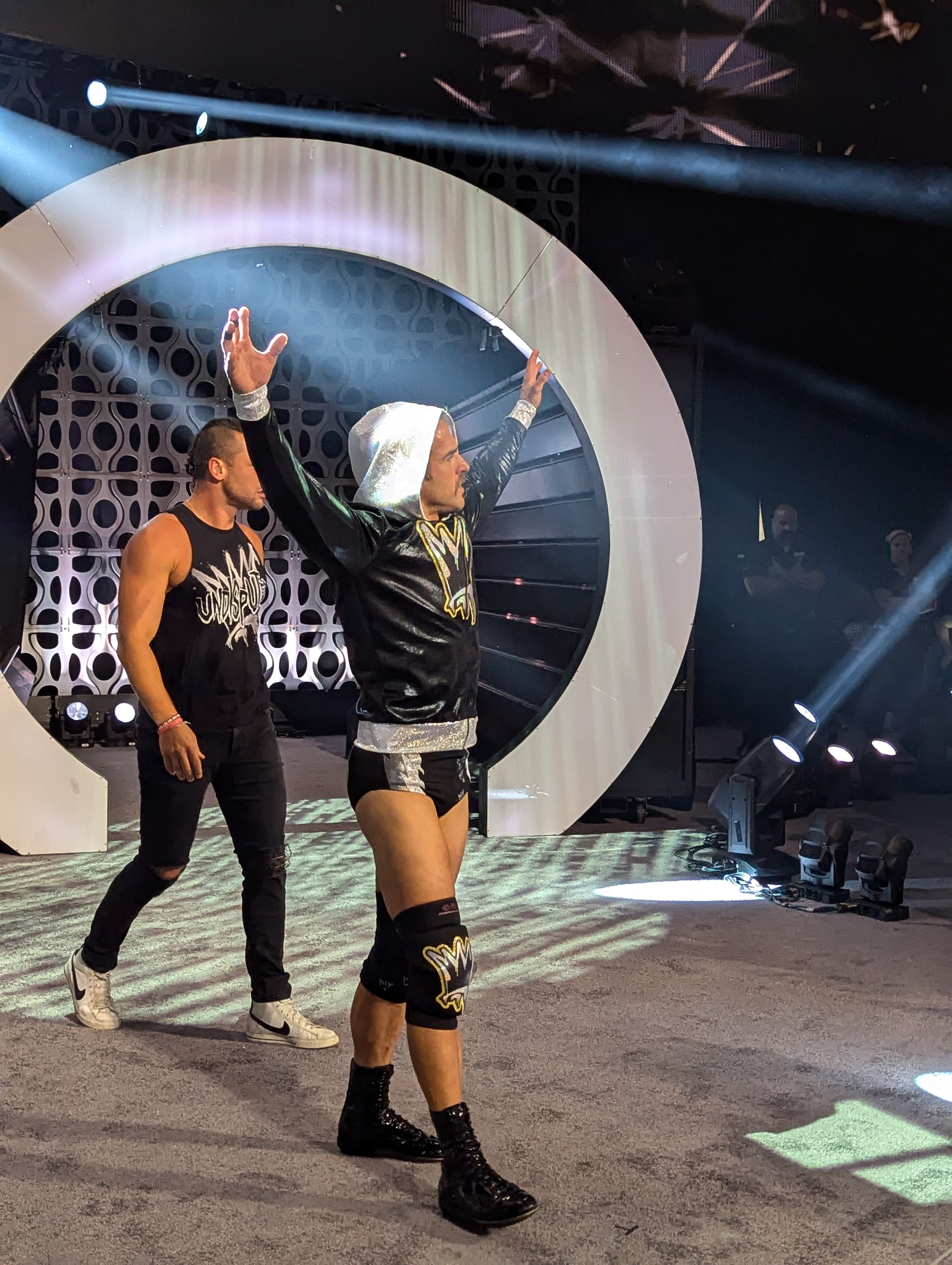
Strong making his entrance in September 2024

On April 26, 2023, Strong made his surprise debut in All Elite Wrestling (AEW), appearing on AEW Dynamite and saving Adam Cole from an attack by Jericho Appreciation Society. The following week, Strong wrestled his first AEW match when he teamed with Cole, Orange Cassidy, and Bandido to defeat the Jericho Appreciation Society (Angelo Parker, Daniel Garcia, Jake Hager and Matt Menard). On the May 17 edition of Dynamite, Strong defeated Chris Jericho in a Falls Count Anywhere match, with the help from Cole. On the July 1 episode of AEW Collision, Strong competed in the Owen Hart Foundation Men's Tournament, losing to Samoa Joe in the quarterfinals of the tournament. In August 2023, Strong, who suffered a neck injury (kayfabe), along with The Kingdom confronted Adam Cole for his alliance with MJF. On September 6 episode of Dynamite, Strong competed in the Grand Slam Tournament, defeating Trent Beretta in the quarterfinals, Darby Allin in the semifinals and lost to Samoa Joe in the final round on September 13 and after the match Strong suffered another neck injury (kayfabe).

On December 30, 2023 at Worlds End, Strong revealed himself as one of The Devil's Masked Men, along with Taven, Bennett and Wardlow attacked MJF, with Adam Cole revealing himself as the Devil. On the January 3, 2024, episode of Dynamite, Cole announced that the stable had changed its name to The Undisputed Kingdom (using a similar name to The Undisputed Era, Strong and Cole's previous faction from their time in WWE NXT) and laid out their goals, which included Strong capturing the AEW International Championship. On the January 17 episode, Strong, Bennett, and Taven confronted International Champion Orange Cassidy after his match. Cassidy offered to defend the title against Strong right then, but Strong rejected and said he wanted to face Cassidy for the title at Revolution, which was later made official. At the event, Strong defeated Orange Cassidy for the title, winning his first championship in AEW. After the match, Strong, Taven and Bennett was confronted by Kyle O'Reilly. On the April 13 at Battle of the Belts X, Strong defeated Rocky Romero in an AEW International Championship eliminator match. After the match, Strong continued to attack Romero until O'Reilly made the save, which caused Strong to attack O'Reilly. This led to a match being made between the both of them at Dynasty for the International Championship, where Strong retained the title. On May 26 at Double or Nothing, Strong lost the title to Will Ospreay, ending his reign at 84 days.

On the June 5 episode of Dynamite, Strong unsuccessfully challenged Swerve Strickland for the AEW World Championship. On the July 13 episode of AEW Collision, Strong defeated Dalton Castle to become the number one Contender for the ROH World Championship, earning a match against champion Mark Briscoe at Death Before Dishonor. This would be Strong's first ROH appearance since 2016, which is now the sister promotion of AEW. At the event, Strong failed to win the title from Mark Briscoe. On August 25 at All In, Strong completed in the Casino Gauntlet match, which was won by Christian Cage. On the October 23 episode of Dynamite, Strong and the rest of the Undisputed Kingdom turned babyface and reginited their feud with MJF, who was now a heel. On the same night, MJF made a deal with both Strong and Cole, stating that whoever won three matches in a row first would get a match against him at Full Gear on November 23. Strong was able to complete the challenge, defeating Shane Taylor, followed by The Beast Mortos, and finally Lance Archer in a Falls count anywhere match, earning a match against MJF at Full Gear. At Full Gear, Strong was defeated by MJF. On December 28 at Worlds End, Strong and O'Reilly came to the aid of Cole from an MJF attack.

==== The Paragon and The Conglomeration (2025–present) ====
On the April 9, 2025 episode of Dynamite following Dynasty, Cole addressed winning the AEW TNT Championship in a backstage segment alongside Strong and O'Reilly and formed their own group known as "The Paragon". On May 25 at Double or Nothing, Paragon were defeated by Don Callis Family (Josh Alexander, Konosuke Takeshita, Kyle Fletcher). On July 12 at All In, Strong competed in the Casino Gauntlet match, which was won by MJF. On November 12 at Blood & Guts, Strong and O'Reilly teamed with Darby Allin, Mark Briscoe, and Orange Cassidy in a Blood and Guts match, where they defeated the Death Riders (Jon Moxley, Claudio Castagnoli, Wheeler Yuta, Daniel Garcia, and Pac). On November 24, Strong was announced as a participant in the 2025 Continental Classic, where he was placed in the Blue League. Strong finished the tournament with the lowest points in his league with 3 points and failed advanced to the semi-finals.

On the February 11, 2026 episode of Dynamite, Strong would tease a heel turn after walking out on Orange Cassidy during a tag match. This turned out to be a ruse as, exactly a month later on the final Dynamite before Revolution, Strong would help Cassidy fend off The Dogs (David Finlay, Clark Connors, and Gabe Kidd). At Revolution on March 15, Strong, Cassidy, and Darby Allin defeated The Dogs in a tornado trios match. On March 22 at Collision: Slam Dunk Sunday, Strong joined Cassidy's stable The Conglomeration, while also keeping his status in The Paragon. At Dynasty on April 12, The Conglomeration (Strong, Cassidy, and a returning Kyle O'Reilly) defeated The Dogs to win the AEW World Trios Championship. On the July 29 episode of Dynamite, The Conglomeration lost their Trios Championship to The Demand (Ricochet, Bishop Kaun, and Toa Liona), ending their reign at 108 days.

== Personal life ==
In December 2015, Lindsey got engaged to mixed martial artist and fellow wrestler Marina Shafir and they had a son. Lindsey and Shafir were married on November 7, 2018.

== Championships and accomplishments ==
Strong is a former ROH World Television Champion in Ring of Honor.

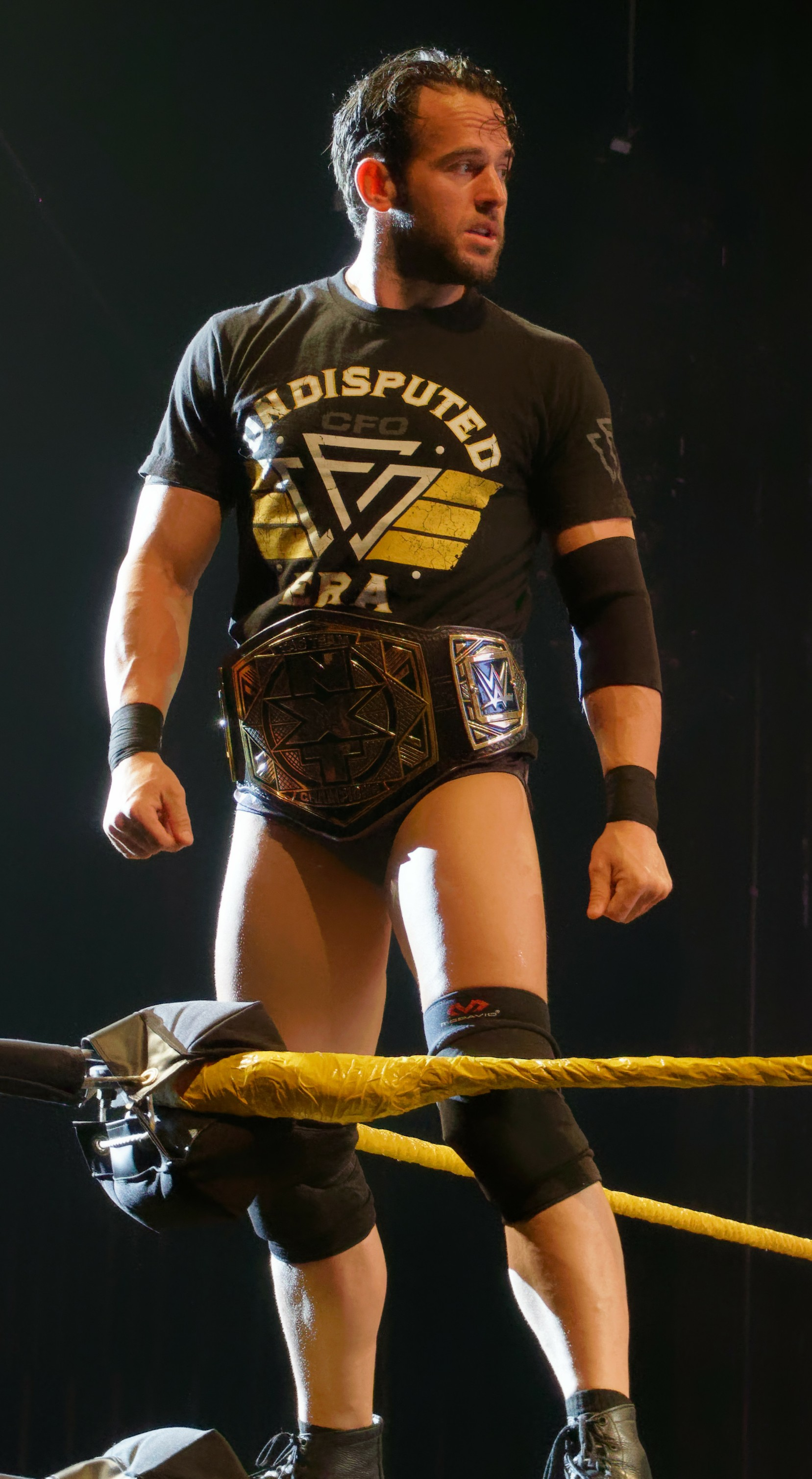
Strong is a two-time NXT Tag Team Champion as a member of The Undisputed Era in WWE's NXT brand.

- All Elite Wrestling
  - AEW International Championship (1 time)
  - AEW World Trios Championship (1 time) – with Kyle O'Reilly and Orange Cassidy
- American Wrestling Federation
  - AWF Heavyweight Championship (1 time)
- Championship Wrestling from Florida
  - NWA Florida X Division Championship (3 times)
- Full Impact Pro
  - FIP Tag Team Championship (2 times) – with Erick Stevens (1) and Rich Swann (1)
  - FIP World Heavyweight Championship (3 times)
- Florida Entertainment Wrestling
  - FEW Heavyweight Championship (1 time)
- Independent Professional Wrestling
  - IPW Florida Unified Cruiserweight Championship (1 time)
  - IPW Tag Team Championship (1 time) – with Sedrick Strong
- Independent Wrestling Association East Coast
  - IWA East Coast Heavyweight Championship (1 time)
- Independent Wrestling Association Mid-South
  - Revolution Strong Style Tournament (2008)
- Lethal Wrestling Federation
  - LWF Heavyweight Championship (1 time)
- Premiere Wrestling Xperience
  - PWX Tag Team Championship (1 time) – with Eddie Edwards
- Pro Wrestling Guerrilla
  - PWG World Championship (1 time)
  - PWG World Tag Team Championship (3 times) – with Davey Richards (1), Pac (1) and Jack Evans (1)
  - Dynamite Duumvirate Tag Team Title Tournament (2007) – with PAC
  - Dynamite Duumvirate Tag Team Title Tournament (2008) – with Jack Evans
- Pro Wrestling Illustrated
  - Ranked No. 13 of the top 500 singles wrestlers in the PWI 500 in 2011 and 2016
- Pro Wrestling Noah
  - Nippon TV Cup Jr. Heavyweight Tag League Outstanding Performance Award (2010) – with Eddie Edwards
- Ring of Honor
  - ROH World Championship (1 time)
  - ROH (World) Tag Team Championship (1 time) – with Austin Aries (Note: During Strong's reign as ROH Tag Team Champion the ROH Tag Team Championship name was changed to ROH World Tag Team Championship.)
  - ROH World Television Championship (2 times)
  - Survival of the Fittest (2005)
  - Honor Gauntlet (2010)
  - Toronto Gauntlet (2010)
  - Second Triple Crown Champion
- SoCal Uncensored
  - Match of the Year (2006) with Jack Evans vs. Super Dragon and Davey Richards, March 4, Pro Wrestling Guerrilla
  - Match of the Year (2013) with Eddie Edwards vs. Inner City Machine Guns (Rich Swann and Ricochet) and The Young Bucks (Matt Jackson and Nick Jackson) on August 9
- South Florida Championship Wrestling
  - SFCW Heavyweight Championship (1 time)
  - SFCW Tag Team Championship (1 time) – with Justin Venom
- Wrestling Observer Newsletter
  - Most Improved Wrestler (2005)
- WWE
  - NXT Cruiserweight Championship (1 time)
  - NXT North American Championship (1 time)
  - NXT Tag Team Championship (2 times) – with Bobby Fish, Adam Cole, and Kyle O'Reilly (1) (Note: Fish and O'Reilly originally won the title as a duo, but Cole and Strong also became recognized as champions under the Freebird Rule after Fish suffered an injury. He won the title a second time just with O'Reilly.) and Kyle O'Reilly (1)
  - Men's World's Collide Battle Royale (2019)
  - NXT Year-End Award (2 times)
    - Tag Team of the Year (2018, 2020) – with Kyle O'Reilly (2018), and with The Undisputed Era (2020)
