= Field of Honor (board game) =

Board game

Field of Honor is a 1982 board game published by Ragnarok Enterprises.

== Gameplay ==
Field of Honor is a man-to-man joust simulation for medieval knights.

== Reception ==
John Rankin reviewed Field of Honor in The Space Gamer No. 55. Rankin commented, "My recommendation: If you like to design games, do so. You might get paid for it. Don't pay a 'professional' game designer for the privilege of finishing his work. It's a bad investment of your time and it encourages sloppy work."
