= Battle of Los Angeles (professional wrestling) =

Annual independent wrestling tournament by PWG

- Promotions: Pro Wrestling Guerrilla
- First event: 2005
- Last event: 2023
- Event gimmick: Annual single elimination tournament

The Battle of Los Angeles tournament (the BOLA) was an annual independent wrestling tournament in North America, run and promoted by Pro Wrestling Guerrilla (PWG). It is the flagship event of PWG. Over the years, the tournament has featured numerous notable wrestlers such as Total Nonstop Action Wrestling stars A.J. Styles and Christopher Daniels, future WWE world champions Kevin Steen (Kevin Owens), Bryan Danielson (Daniel Bryan), Tyler Black (Seth Rollins) and Drew Galloway (Drew McIntyre), future AEW world champion Kenny Omega and future Impact world champions Brian Cage, Pentagón Jr., Chris Sabin, Rich Swann, Sami Callihan, John Hennigan (Johnny Impact), Austin Aries and Eddie Edwards.

== The tournament setup ==
The number of participants have often changed over the years. In the first year of the Battle of Los Angeles, there were sixteen participants, with eight opening round matches, four quarterfinal matches, two semifinal matches, and a final. In 2006 the tournament was expanded to 24 participants, which caused the addition of another eight person bracket and created three semifinals matches and an elimination three-way final match. In 2008 the tournament returned to its 16-man format. In 2011, the tournament was completely revamped, taking place for the first time as a one night tournament with only eight participants. In 2014, the tournament reverted to a 24-man format held over three nights. The first two nights are all first-round matches, while the third night contains the quarter-finals and semi-finals before culminating in a three-way match. In 2022, the tournament was reduced to sixteen participants.

All nights also feature non-tournament special attractions, which are usually tag-team matches involving tournament participants from other nights or eliminated wrestlers. Titles are also occasionally defended on these events.

The tournament winner is awarded a title shot for the PWG World Championship. The champion himself often participates in the tournament and if some other wrestler wins the tournament then he is entitled to a title shot. So far, no champion has won the tournament. There have been a few instances where the winner did not receive a title shot. For example, the 2006 winner Davey Richards cashed in on a PWG World Tag Team Championship opportunity instead of challenging for the World Championship. The 2007 winner CIMA did not invoke his title shot while the 2008 winner Low Ki left PWG immediately after winning the tournament due to signing with WWE. The 2009 tournament was itself contested for the vacant PWG World Championship.

== Winners, dates, venues and main events ==
| Year | Tournament winner | Times won | Date | Runner-up | City | Venue | Main event | Ref. |
|---|---|---|---|---|---|---|---|---|
| 2005 | Chris Bosh | 1 | September 3, 2005 | AJ Styles | Los Angeles, California | Hollywood-Los Feliz Jewish Community Center | Kevin Steen vs. Super Dragon in the first round of the 2005 Battle of Los Angeles tournament | |
| 2005 | Chris Bosh | 1 | September 4, 2005 | AJ Styles | Los Angeles, California | Hollywood-Los Feliz Jewish Community Center | AJ Styles vs. Chris Bosh in the 2005 Battle of Los Angeles tournament final | |
| 2006 | Davey Richards | 1 | September 1, 2006 | CIMA | Reseda, Los Angeles, California | American Legion Post #308 | B-Boy, Excalibur, Homicide and Human Tornado vs. Petey Williams and The Dynasty (Chris Bosh, Joey Ryan and Scott Lost) | |
| 2006 | Davey Richards | 1 | September 2, 2006 | CIMA | Reseda, Los Angeles, California | American Legion Post #308 | Necro Butcher vs. Super Dragon in a No Disqualification match in the first round of the 2006 Battle of Los Angeles tournament | |
| 2006 | Davey Richards | 1 | September 3, 2006 | CIMA | Reseda, Los Angeles, California | American Legion Post #308 | CIMA vs. Davey Richards in the 2006 Battle of Los Angeles tournament final | |
| 2007 | CIMA | 1 | August 31, 2007 | El Generico and Roderick Strong | Burbank, California | Burbank Armory | El Generico and Kevin Steen (c) vs. Dragon Kid and Susumu Yokosuka for the PWG World Tag Team Championship | |
| 2007 | CIMA | 1 | September 1, 2007 | El Generico and Roderick Strong | Burbank, California | Burbank Armory | Dragon Kid vs. Susumu Yokosuka in the first round of the 2007 Battle of Los Angeles tournament | |
| 2007 | CIMA | 1 | September 2, 2007 | El Generico and Roderick Strong | Burbank, California | Burbank Armory | CIMA vs. El Generico vs. Roderick Strong in a three-way elimination match in the 2007 Battle of Los Angeles tournament final | |
| 2008 | Low Ki | 1 | November 1, 2008 | Chris Hero | Burbank, California | Burbank Armory | Chris Hero vs. Necro Butcher in a No Disqualification match in the first round of the 2008 Battle of Los Angeles tournament | |
| 2008 | Low Ki | 1 | November 2, 2008 | Chris Hero | Burbank, California | Burbank Armory | Chris Hero vs. Low Ki in the 2008 Battle of Los Angeles tournament final | |
| 2009 | Kenny Omega | 1 | November 20, 2009 | Roderick Strong | Reseda, Los Angeles, California | American Legion Post #308 | Alex Shelley vs. El Generico in the first round of the 2009 Battle of Los Angeles tournament | |
| 2009 | Kenny Omega | 1 | November 21, 2009 | Roderick Strong | Reseda, Los Angeles, California | American Legion Post #308 | Kenny Omega vs. Roderick Strong in the 2009 Battle of Los Angeles tournament final for the vacant PWG World Championship | |
| 2010 | Joey Ryan | 1 | September 4, 2010 | Chris Hero | Reseda, Los Angeles, California | American Legion Post #308 | Chris Hero vs. Christopher Daniels in the first round of the 2010 Battle of Los Angeles tournament | |
| 2010 | Joey Ryan | 1 | September 5, 2010 | Chris Hero | Reseda, Los Angeles, California | American Legion Post #308 | Chris Hero vs. Joey Ryan in the 2010 Battle of Los Angeles tournament final | |
| 2011 | El Generico | 1 | August 20, 2011 | Kevin Steen | Reseda, Los Angeles, California | American Legion Post #308 | Kevin Steen vs. El Generico in the 2011 Battle of Los Angeles tournament final | |
| 2012 | Adam Cole | 1 | September 1, 2012 | Michael Elgin | Reseda, Los Angeles, California | American Legion Post #308 | Davey Richards vs. Michael Elgin in the first round of the 2012 Battle of Los Angeles tournament | |
| 2012 | Adam Cole | 1 | September 2, 2012 | Michael Elgin | Reseda, Los Angeles, California | American Legion Post #308 | Adam Cole vs. Michael Elgin in the 2012 Battle of Los Angeles tournament final | |
| 2013 | Kyle O'Reilly | 1 | August 30, 2013 | Michael Elgin | Reseda, Los Angeles, California | American Legion Post #308 | Adam Cole and The Young Bucks (Matt Jackson and Nick Jackson) vs. Forever Hooligans (Alex Koslov and Rocky Romero) and T.J. Perkins | |
| 2013 | Kyle O'Reilly | 1 | August 31, 2013 | Michael Elgin | Reseda, Los Angeles, California | American Legion Post #308 | Kyle O'Reilly vs. Michael Elgin in the 2013 Battle of Los Angeles tournament final | |
| 2014 | Ricochet | 1 | August 29, 2014 | Johnny Gargano and Roderick Strong | Reseda, Los Angeles, California | American Legion Post #308 | Men of Low Moral Fiber (Chuck Taylor and Kenny Omega) and Zack Sabre Jr. vs. Mount Rushmore (Adam Cole and The Young Bucks (Matt Jackson and Nick Jackson)) | |
| 2014 | Ricochet | 1 | August 30, 2014 | Johnny Gargano and Roderick Strong | Reseda, Los Angeles, California | American Legion Post #308 | The Young Bucks (Matt Jackson and Nick Jackson) vs. Bad Influence (Christopher Daniels and Frankie Kazarian) | |
| 2014 | Ricochet | 1 | August 31, 2014 | Johnny Gargano and Roderick Strong | Reseda, Los Angeles, California | American Legion Post #308 | Johnny Gargano vs. Roderick Strong vs. Ricochet in a three-way match in the 2014 Battle of Los Angeles tournament final | |
| 2015 | Zack Sabre Jr. | 1 | August 28, 2015 | Chris Hero and Mike Bailey | Reseda, Los Angeles, California | American Legion Post #308 | Mount Rushmore 2.0 (The Young Bucks (Matt Jackson and Nick Jackson) and Roderick Strong) vs. Euro Trash (Marty Scurll, Tommy End and Zack Sabre Jr.) | |
| 2015 | Zack Sabre Jr. | 1 | August 29, 2015 | Chris Hero and Mike Bailey | Reseda, Los Angeles, California | American Legion Post #308 | Mount Rushmore 2.0 (The Young Bucks (Matt Jackson and Nick Jackson) and Super Dragon) vs. Andrew Everett, Biff Busick and Trevor Lee | |
| 2015 | Zack Sabre Jr. | 1 | August 30, 2015 | Chris Hero and Mike Bailey | Reseda, Los Angeles, California | American Legion Post #308 | Chris Hero vs. Mike Bailey vs. Zack Sabre Jr. in a three-way elimination match in the 2015 Battle of Los Angeles tournament final | |
| 2016 | Marty Scurll | 1 | September 2, 2016 | Trevor Lee and Will Ospreay | Reseda, Los Angeles, California | American Legion Post #308 | Mount Rushmore 2.0 (Adam Cole and The Young Bucks (Matt Jackson and Nick Jackson)) vs. Bobby Fish, Dalton Castle and Kyle O'Reilly | |
| 2016 | Marty Scurll | 1 | September 3, 2016 | Trevor Lee and Will Ospreay | Reseda, Los Angeles, California | American Legion Post #308 | Matt Sydal, Ricochet and Will Ospreay vs. Mount Rushmore 2.0 (Adam Cole and The Young Bucks (Matt Jackson and Nick Jackson)) | |
| 2016 | Marty Scurll | 1 | September 4, 2016 | Trevor Lee and Will Ospreay | Reseda, Los Angeles, California | American Legion Post #308 | Marty Scurll vs. Trevor Lee vs. Will Ospreay in a three-way elimination match in the 2016 Battle of Los Angeles tournament final | |
| 2017 | Ricochet | 2 | September 1, 2017 | Jeff Cobb and Keith Lee | Reseda, Los Angeles, California | American Legion Post #308 | Ricochet vs. Flamita in the first round of the 2017 Battle of Los Angeles tournament | |
| 2017 | Ricochet | 2 | September 2, 2017 | Jeff Cobb and Keith Lee | Reseda, Los Angeles, California | American Legion Post #308 | The Elite (Kenny Omega and The Young Bucks (Matt Jackson and Nick Jackson)) vs. Flamita, Penta El Zero M and Rey Fenix | |
| 2017 | Ricochet | 2 | September 3, 2017 | Jeff Cobb and Keith Lee | Reseda, Los Angeles, California | American Legion Post #308 | Jeff Cobb vs. Keith Lee vs. Ricochet in a three-way elimination match in the 2017 Battle of Los Angeles tournament final | |
| 2018 | Jeff Cobb | 1 | September 14, 2018 | Bandido and Shingo Takagi | Los Angeles, California | Globe Theatre | Ringkampf (Timothy Thatcher and WALTER) vs. Ilja Dragunov and Shingo Takagi | |
| 2018 | Jeff Cobb | 1 | September 15, 2018 | Bandido and Shingo Takagi | Los Angeles, California | Globe Theatre | Bandido, Flamita and Rey Horus vs. CIMA and The Rascalz (Dezmond Xavier and Zachary Wentz) | |
| 2018 | Jeff Cobb | 1 | September 16, 2018 | Bandido and Shingo Takagi | Los Angeles, California | Globe Theatre | Bandido vs. Jeff Cobb vs. Shingo Takagi in a three-way elimination match in the 2018 Battle of Los Angeles tournament final | |
| 2019 | Bandido | 1 | September 20, 2019 | David Starr and Jonathan Gresham | Los Angeles, California | Globe Theatre | Lucha Brothers (PENTA EL 0M and Rey Fenix) vs. MexaBlood (Bandido and Flamita) | |
| 2019 | Bandido | 1 | September 21, 2019 | David Starr and Jonathan Gresham | Los Angeles, California | Globe Theatre | Daisuke Sekimoto and Jonathan Gresham vs. King's Hawaiian (Brody King and Jeff Cobb) | |
| 2019 | Bandido | 1 | September 22, 2019 | David Starr and Jonathan Gresham | Los Angeles, California | Globe Theatre | Bandido vs. David Starr vs. Jonathan Gresham in the 2019 Battle of Los Angeles tournament final | |
| 2022 | Daniel Garcia | 1 | January 29, 2022 | Mike Bailey | Los Angeles, California | Globe Theatre | Bandido vs. Mike Bailey in the first round of the 2022 Battle of Los Angeles tournament | |
| 2022 | Daniel Garcia | 1 | January 30, 2022 | Mike Bailey | Los Angeles, California | Globe Theatre | Daniel Garcia vs. Mike Bailey in the 2022 Battle of Los Angeles tournament final | |
| 2023 | Mike Bailey | 1 | January 7, 2023 | Konosuke Takeshita | Los Angeles, California | Globe Theatre | Bandido vs. Black Taurus vs. El Hijo del Vikingo in a Three-way match in the first round of the 2023 Battle of Los Angeles tournament | |
| 2023 | Mike Bailey | 1 | January 8, 2023 | Konosuke Takeshita | Los Angeles, California | Globe Theatre | Konosuke Takeshita vs. Mike Bailey in the 2023 Battle of Los Angeles tournament final | |

=== Championship match for winner ===
– Championship victory
– Championship match loss
– Did not receive title match

| # | Winner | Event | Year | Championship match |
|---|---|---|---|---|
| 1 | Chris Bosh | After School Special | 2005 | Bosh challenged Kevin Steen for the PWG Championship but lost via disqualification. Bosh received another opportunity for the title against Steen in a Three-Way Dance, also involving AJ Styles but lost again. |
| 2 | Davey Richards | All Star Weekend IV - Night 1 | 2006 | Instead of challenging for the PWG World Championship, Richards opted to challenge Arrogance (Chris Bosh and Scott Lost) for the PWG World Tag Team Championship alongside Super Dragon at Self-Titled but failed to show up. Dragon instead teamed with B-Boy to defeat Arrogance. Richards got his title opportunity at All Star Weekend IV by teaming with Roderick Strong to defeat Dragon and B-Boy for the titles. |
| 3 | CIMA | N/A | 2007 | After winning the tournament, CIMA left PWG to compete in his home promotion Dragon Gate in Japan and returned to PWG in 2008. |
| 4 | Low Ki | N/A | 2008 | After winning the tournament, Low Ki left PWG due to signing a developmental contract with WWE and did not return to the promotion until 2011. |
| 5 | Joey Ryan | Card Subject To Change III | 2010 | Ryan successfully defended his title shot against Candice LeRae at the 2011 Dynamite Duumvirate Tag Team Title Tournament. Ryan challenged Claudio Castagnoli for the PWG World Championship at Card Subject To Change III but lost. |
| 6 | El Generico | Steen Wolf | 2011 | Generico defeated Kevin Steen in a ladder match to win the PWG World Championship. |
| 7 | Adam Cole | Mystery Vortex | 2012 | Cole defeated Kevin Steen in a Guerrilla Warfare to win the PWG World Championship. |
| 8 | Kyle O'Reilly | Matt Rushmore | 2013 | O'Reilly challenged Adam Cole for the PWG World Championship but lost. |
| 9 | Ricochet | Black Cole Sun | 2014 | Ricochet challenged Kyle O'Reilly for the PWG World Championship but lost. |
| 10 | Zack Sabre Jr. | All Star Weekend 12 - Night 2 | 2015 | Sabre defeated Roderick Strong to win the PWG World Championship. |
| 11 | Marty Scurll | Mystery Vortex IV | 2016 | Scurll challenged Zack Sabre Jr. for the PWG World Championship but lost. |
| 12 | Ricochet | All Star Weekend 13 - Night 2 | 2017 | Ricochet defeated Chuck Taylor to win the PWG World Championship. |
| 13 | Jeff Cobb | Smokey and the Bandido | 2018 | Cobb defeated WALTER to win the PWG World Championship. |
| 14 | Bandido | Makings of a Varsity Athlete | 2019 | Bandido defeated Jeff Cobb to win the PWG World Championship. |
| 15 | Daniel Garcia | Delivering The Goods | 2022 | Garcia defeated Bandido to win the PWG World Championship. |
| 16 | Mike Bailey | Twenty: Mystery Vortex | 2023 | Bailey lost to Daniel Garcia in an Iron Man match for the PWG World Championship. |

The 2009 Battle of Los Angeles winner did not receive a title match as the tournament itself was for the vacant PWG World Championship. Kenny Omega defeated Roderick Strong in the tournament final to win the vacant title.
