= Battle of Los Angeles (2016) =

2016 professional wrestling tournament by PWG

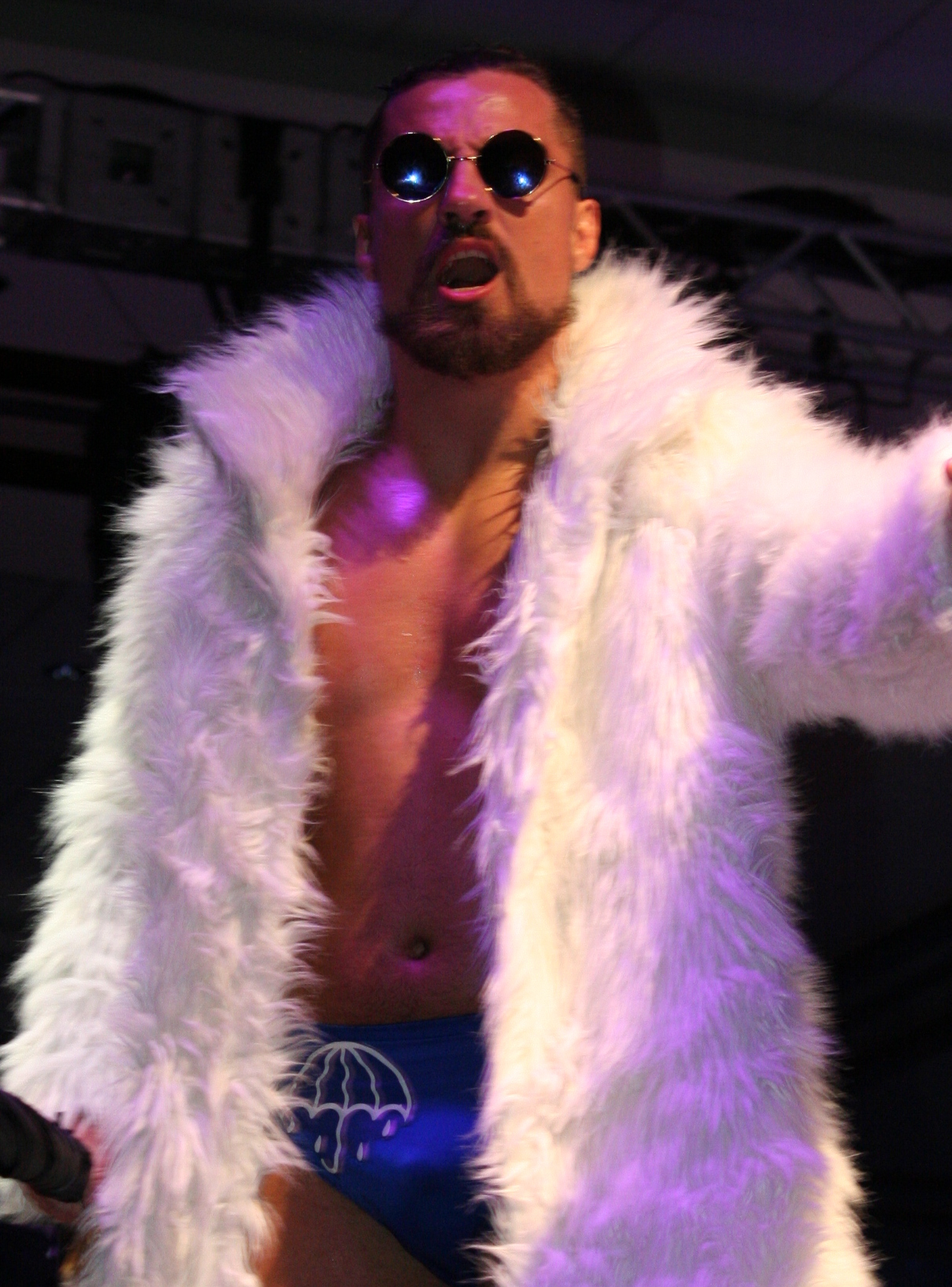
- The 2016 tournament winner Marty Scurll
- Promotion: Pro Wrestling Guerrilla
- Date: Night One: September 2, 2016; Night Two: September 3, 2016; Night Three: September 4, 2016
- City: Reseda, Los Angeles, California
- Venue: American Legion Post #308

Event chronology
← Previous; Thirteen	Next → Mystery Vortex IV

Battle of Los Angeles chronology
← Previous; 2015	Next → 2017

Battle of Los Angeles (2016) was the twelfth Battle of Los Angeles professional wrestling tournament produced by Pro Wrestling Guerrilla (PWG). It was a three-night event which took place on September 2, September 3 and September 4, 2016, at the American Legion Post #308 in Reseda, Los Angeles, California.

The twenty-four man tournament concluded with a three-way elimination match in the final, in which Marty Scurll defeated Trevor Lee and Will Ospreay. Several non-tournament matches took place across three nights. The event featured the PWG debut of Cody Rhodes, John Hennigan, Mark Haskins, Matthew Riddle and Pete Dunne.

The first night was headlined by a six-man tag team match, in which Mount Rushmore 2.0 (Adam Cole and The Young Bucks (Matt Jackson and Nick Jackson)) defeated Bobby Fish, Dalton Castle and Kyle O'Reilly. The second night was headlined by a six-man tag team match, in which Matt Sydal, Ricochet and Will Ospreay defeated Mount Rushmore 2.0 (Adam Cole and The Young Bucks). On the undercard, Fenix and Pentagon Jr. defeated Chris Hero and Tommy End. The third night featured a twelve-man tag team match, along with The Young Bucks defending the World Tag Team Championship against Fenix and Pentagon Jr.

== Production ==
=== Background ===
It was announced that the 2016 edition of the Battle of Los Angeles would be a three-night event taking place on September 2, September 3 and September 4, 2016, at the American Legion Post #308 in Reseda, Los Angeles, California.

=== Storylines ===
==== Original line-up ====
The recently departed WWE star Cody Rhodes was announced to make his PWG debut as the first participant in the Battle of Los Angeles. The next three participants announced for the tournament were Kamaitachi, Jeff Cobb and the debuting Mark Haskins.

On June 28, eight new participants were announced for the tournament including former WWE star, the debuting John Hennigan (formerly John Morrison), Dalton Castle, Pete Dunne, Sami Callihan, Tommy End, Trevor Lee, 2012 winner Adam Cole and Jack Gallagher. On June 30, four more participants in the tournament were announced on Twitter: Chris Hero, Mark Andrews, 2014 winner Ricochet, and Matthew Riddle. On July 2, four more names were announced for the tournament: Marty Scurll, Matt Sydal, Kyle O'Reilly, and Fénix. The final four participants were Jushin Liger, Pentagón Jr., Will Ospreay, and the 2015 winner the World Champion Zack Sabre Jr.

==== Replacement ====
Adam Cole removed himself from Battle of Los Angeles on July 21, stating that he had already won the Battle Los Angeles (once) and had no interest in competing again and was replaced by Cedric Alexander. However, Cole remained a part of the event by participating in non-tournament matches. Jack Gallagher was originally announced for the tournament, but could not make the show due to travel issues and was replaced by Tommaso Ciampa.

==== Non-tournament matches ====
Due to Adam Cole withdrawing from the Battle of Los Angeles, he was scheduled to team with his Mount Rushmore 2.0 teammates The Young Bucks in six-man tag team matches on the first two nights of Battle of Los Angeles. It was announced that Cole and the Bucks would compete against Dalton Castle and The Boys on the first night, and the team of Matt Sydal, Ricochet, and Will Ospreay on the second night.

== Reception ==
Jake St-Pierre of 411Mania praised the night one of the tournament, rating it 9. He said that it was "one of the better shows in PWG's history to boot". He praised most of the performances with minimal criticism directed at John Hennigan and Matt Sydal's match as "a bit low-key" and the main event six-man tag team match as "a bit corny". He stated that the night two was "one of the best 2 and half hours of wrestling", with praise towards "the mindblowing trios main event", "End & Hero vs. Pentagon and Fenix", Mark Andrews and Pete Dunne's match as "a high-octane cat and mouse match", Matt Riddle and Kyle O'Reilly's and "grappling that would make Akira Maeda shed a tear of joy". He appreciated the diverse wrestling on this show, recommending that "you'll be able to find a style of wrestling you enjoy, and those styles are all represented by the best the wrestling world has to offer."

Andrew of SoCal Uncensored reviewed it as a "good show overall", which "seemed to set the stage for the entire weekend", with specific praise towards a few matches, as "Ospreay/Fenix pretty much killed it andCobb/Ricochet was a great showcase for Cobb". He believed that "Hero/End vs. Pentagon Jr./Fenix was the best match of the" night two. He further stated "The tournament matches were really solid overall, with guys having impressive individual performances. The main event was a fun spot fest. There was a badly botched spot and some spots that looked too telegraphed, but it was a fun sprint. The three standout performers of the show were Ricochet for his performance in the main event, Mark Andrews with another great performance, and Cody Rhodes for being one of the most enthusiastic wrestlers." The first part of the night three "was bordering between averagely boring and pretty good". He praised a few matches on the card by stating "Ricochet and Hennigan had a very fun match, as was Hero and Andrews’ match as well as the post match angle."

Steve Bryant of SoCal Uncensored praised the night one as "a really good show and a great start to the tournament". He said that "commentary on this show was excellent" and "The Fenix/Ospreay and Jeff Cobb/Ricochet matches were really good and worth the purchase of this just for those matches." He said that the night two was "the best single show in SoCal over the last 16 years". He felt that the night three "was another awesome night of wrestling". He said that "Every match in the actual tournament was good." He praised the match between Cody Rhodes and Marty Scurll as "a really great performance". He believed that Young Bucks and the team of Fenix and Pentagon Jr. "were phenomenal throughout the weekend", with both teams being part "of tag matches on night 2 that were the two best matches in SoCal this year" and the latter team not showing "a lucha style in the match and really showed their range". He said that the three nights of Battle of Los Angeles were "3 fantastic shows, once again showing why they (PWG) have the best wrestling in the world".

Kevin Pantoja rated the night one 7.0 stating it as "A good way to start the tournament". He said that "Nothing on the show was blow away great or a match of the year contender, but nothing was really bad either." He felt that "Sydal/Hennigan" was skippable and further stated that "Ricochet/Cobb, Liger/Hero and Ospreay/Fenix are all fun, while Scurll/Pentagon was the MOTN". He rated the night two 8.5 as "a consistently strong show", with some criticism towards "the opener, Sami/Cody and main event" while "the Heroes Eventually Die/Pentagon and Fenix tag was the best thing". He gave mixed reviews to night three, considering it "the weakest of the three shows." He rated it 7.0 with nothing "bad but some stuff underwhelmed (O’Reilly/Haskins and the main event)". He praised the "Ospreay/Ricochet, Scurll/Haskins and Hero/Andrews" matches and stated that there were "two great matches in Ospreay/Sabre and the Tag Team Title match".

The six-man tag team match between Mount Rushmore 2.0 and the team of Matt Sydal, Ricochet and Will Ospreay on the second night received unanimous praise from critics, with Dave Meltzer awarding it the prestigious 5-star rating and SoCal Uncensored awarded it the 2016 Southern California Match of the Year Award.

== Aftermath ==
After winning the 2016 Battle of Los Angeles, Marty Scurll received a title shot for the PWG World Championship against Zack Sabre Jr. at Mystery Vortex IV, which he lost.

== Results ==
Night 1 (September 2)
No.	Results	Stipulations	Times
1	Marty Scurll defeated Pentagon Jr.	Singles match in the first round of Battle of Los Angeles tournament	13:06
2	Ricochet defeated Jeff Cobb	Singles match in the first round of Battle of Los Angeles tournament	13:54
3	John Hennigan defeated Matt Sydal	Singles match in the first round of Battle of Los Angeles tournament	14:15
4	Will Ospreay defeated Fenix	Singles match in the first round of Battle of Los Angeles tournament	10:29
5	Zack Sabre Jr. defeated Tommy End	Singles match in the first round of Battle of Los Angeles tournament	16:40
6	Chris Hero defeated Jushin Liger	Singles match in the first round of Battle of Los Angeles tournament	15:00
7	Mount Rushmore 2.0 (Adam Cole and The Young Bucks (Matt Jackson and Nick Jackson)) defeated Bobby Fish, Dalton Castle and Kyle O'Reilly	Six-man tag team match	19:22

Night 2 (September 3)
No.	Results	Stipulations	Times
1	Dalton Castle defeated Tommaso Ciampa	Singles match in the first round of Battle of Los Angeles tournament	13:26
2	Mark Andrews defeated Pete Dunne	Singles match in the first round of Battle of Los Angeles tournament	18:24
3	Cody Rhodes defeated Sami Callihan	Singles match in the first round of Battle of Los Angeles tournament	11:33
4	Fenix and Pentagon Jr. defeated Chris Hero and Tommy End	Tag team match	18:23
5	Trevor Lee defeated Kamaitachi	Singles match in the first round of Battle of Los Angeles tournament	11:36
6	Mark Haskins defeated Cedric Alexander	Singles match in the first round of Battle of Los Angeles tournament	14:32
7	Kyle O'Reilly defeated Matthew Riddle	Singles match in the first round of Battle of Los Angeles tournament	16:09
8	Matt Sydal, Ricochet and Will Ospreay defeated Mount Rushmore 2.0 (Adam Cole and The Young Bucks (Matt Jackson and Nick Jackson))	Six-man tag team match	20:06

Night 3 (September 4)
No.	Results	Stipulations	Times
1	Trevor Lee defeated Dalton Castle	Singles match in the quarter-final round of Battle of Los Angeles tournament	13:37
2	Ricochet defeated John Hennigan	Singles match in the quarter-final round of Battle of Los Angeles tournament	11:51
3	Marty Scurll defeated Cody Rhodes	Singles match in the quarter-final round of Battle of Los Angeles tournament	11:39
4	Mark Andrews defeated Chris Hero	Singles match in the quarter-final round of Battle of Los Angeles tournament	6:30
5	Mark Haskins defeated Kyle O'Reilly	Singles match in the quarter-final round of Battle of Los Angeles tournament	15:09
6	Will Ospreay defeated Zack Sabre Jr.	Singles match in the quarter-final round of Battle of Los Angeles tournament	10:56
7	The Young Bucks (Matt Jackson and Nick Jackson) (c) defeated Fenix and Pentagon Jr.	Tag team match for the PWG World Tag Team Championship	14:34
8	Trevor Lee defeated Mark Andrews	Singles match in the semi-final round of Battle of Los Angeles tournament	8:18
9	Marty Scurll defeated Mark Haskins	Singles match in the semi-final round of Battle of Los Angeles tournament	16:44
10	Will Ospreay defeated Ricochet	Singles match in the semi-final round of Battle of Los Angeles tournament	10:08
11	Cedric Alexander, Chuck Taylor, Jeff Cobb, Jushin Liger and Tommy End defeated Brian Kendrick, Matthew Riddle, Pete Dunne, Sami Callihan and Tommaso Ciampa	Ten-man tag team match	17:39
12	Marty Scurll defeated Trevor Lee and Will Ospreay (Note: Eliminations were as follows: Eliminated / Wrestler / Eliminated by / Elimination Method / Time; 1 / Will Ospreay / Marty Scurll and Trevor Lee / Submission / 10:00; 2 / Trevor Lee / Marty Scurll / Pinfall / 29:15; 3 / Winner: / Marty Scurll)	Three Way Elimination match in the Battle of Los Angeles tournament final	29:15
(c) / – the champion(s) heading into the match

=== Tournament brackets ===
Battle of Los Angeles (2016)
Tournament information
- Sport: Professional wrestling
- Location: Reseda, Los Angeles, California
- Dates: September 2, 2016–September 4, 2016
- Tournament format: Single elimination tournament
- Participants: 24

Final positions
- Champion: Marty Scurll
- 1st runner-up: Trevor Lee
- 2nd runner-up: Will Ospreay

First round
Dalton Castle	Pin
Tommaso Ciampa	13:26
Kamaitachi	Pin
Trevor Lee	11:36
Chris Hero	Pin
Jushin Liger	15:00
Mark Andrews	Pin
Pete Dunne	18:24

Quarterfinals
Dalton Castle	Pin
Trevor Lee	13:37
Chris Hero	Pin
Mark Andrews	6:30

Semifinals
Trevor Lee	Pin
Mark Andrews	8:18

First round
John Hennigan	Pin
Matt Sydal	14:15
Jeff Cobb	Pin
Ricochet	13:54
Tommy End	Sub
Zack Sabre Jr.	16:40
Fénix	Pin
Will Ospreay	10:29

Quarterfinals
John Hennigan	Pin
Ricochet	11:51
Zack Sabre Jr.	Pin
Will Ospreay	10:56

Semifinals
Ricochet	Pin
Will Ospreay	10:08

First round
Marty Scurll	Sub
Pentagón Jr.	13:06
Cody R	Pin
Sami Callihan	11:33
Cedric Alexander	Sub
Mark Haskins	14:32
Kyle O'Reilly	Pin
Matthew Riddle	16:09

Quarterfinals
Marty Scurll	Pin
Cody R	11:39
Mark Haskins	Sub
Kyle O'Reilly	15:09

Semifinals
Marty Scurll	Sub
Mark Haskins	16:44

Final
Trevor Lee Will Ospreay	Win
Marty Scurll	29:15
