= Battle of Los Angeles (2015) =

2015 professional wrestling tournament by PWG

- Promotion: Pro Wrestling Guerrilla
- Date: Night One: August 28, 2015; Night Two: August 29, 2015; Night Three: August 30, 2015
- City: Reseda, Los Angeles, California
- Venue: American Legion Post #308

Event chronology
← Previous; Threemendous IV	Next → All Star Weekend 11

Battle of Los Angeles chronology
← Previous; 2014	Next → 2016

Battle of Los Angeles (2015) was the eleventh Battle of Los Angeles professional wrestling tournament produced by Pro Wrestling Guerrilla (PWG). It was a three-night event which took place on August 28, August 29 and August 30, 2015, at the American Legion Post #308 in Reseda, Los Angeles, California.

It was a twenty-four man tournament, which concluded with a three-way elimination match, in which Zack Sabre Jr. defeated Chris Hero and Mike Bailey. Several non-tournament matches took place across three nights.

On the first night, Los Güeros del Cielo (Angélico and Jack Evans) defeated The Inner City Machine Guns (Rich Swann and Ricochet) and Mount Rushmore 2.0 (The Young Bucks (Matt Jackson and Nick Jackson) and Roderick Strong) defeated Euro Trash (Marty Scurll, Tommy End and Zack Sabre Jr.).

On the second night, Aero Star and Fenix defeated Drago and Pentagon Jr. The event was headlined by a Guerrilla Warfare, in which Mount Rushmore 2.0 (The Young Bucks and Super Dragon) defeated Andrew Everett, Biff Busick and Trevor Lee.

On the third night, Mount Rushmore 2.0 (The Young Bucks (Matt Jackson and Nick Jackson), Roderick Strong and Super Dragon) defeated Angélico, Fenix and The Inner City Machine Guns (Rich Swann and Ricochet) and Aero Star, Best Friends (Chuck Taylor and Trent), Drew Galloway and Drew Gulak defeated Andrew Everett, Drago, Mark Andrews, Timothy Thatcher and Tommaso Ciampa.

== Reception ==
Jake St. Pierre praised the event, considering it "far and away the finest BOLA of them all and one of the best wrestling tournaments to ever take place". He rated the first night of the tournament 8.5, calling it "one of the best Night One's in the tournament's history". According to him, "The debuts - whether they be from England or Mexico - all worked tremendously", with Will Ospreay and Fenix having "best matches wrestling-wise". He criticized Aero Star's match against Brian Cage, considering it "an inoffensive off-night more than an overhyped mess" and the tag team match between Inner City Machine Guns and Los Gueros del Cielo, "a big letdown".

He specifically praised the night two, rating it 10 as a virtually perfect event. According to him, it was "show of the year" having "everything truly great about PWG". It was the writer's "pick for best PWG show of all time." The undercard had a "consistency" with matches like "Thatcher vs. Hero, Pentagon/Drago vs. Fenix/Aerostar, Galloway vs. Speedball, & Mt. Rushmore 2.0 vs. Busick/Everett/Lee", with the match between Drew Galloway and Mike Bailey being the "best tournament match so far, a near MOTYC with tremendous psychology and workrate out the wazoo". The night two had "one of the best matches in Pro Wrestling Guerrilla's twelve year history."

He rated the night three 9.5 as an amazing event. While it was "not as compact and easy-to-watch as Night One was" and was not "topping Stage Two" but had a huge variety of wrestling itself "from comedy (the ten-man) to phenomenal technical wrestling (Scurll vs. Sabre Jr) to flips (Ospreay vs. Speedball) to maniacal multi-man spotfests (Mt Rushmore vs. Angelico/Fenix/Aerostar/ICMG) to gratifyingly great squash matches (Evans vs. Hero) to dramatic wars of attrition (the finals)."

== Results ==
Night 1 (August 28)
No.	Results	Stipulations	Times
1	Brian Cage defeated Aero Star	Singles match in the first round of Battle of Los Angeles tournament	6:52
2	Biff Busick defeated Andrew Everett	Singles match in the first round of Battle of Los Angeles tournament	14:19
3	Will Ospreay defeated Mark Andrews	Singles match in the first round of Battle of Los Angeles tournament	10:50
4	Los Güeros del Cielo (Angélico and Jack Evans) defeated The Inner City Machine Guns (Rich Swann and Ricochet)	Tag team match	21:43
5	Trevor Lee defeated Trent?	Singles match in the first round of Battle of Los Angeles tournament	14:20
6	Pentagon Jr. defeated Drago	Singles match in the first round of Battle of Los Angeles tournament	11:27
7	Matt Sydal defeated Fenix	Singles match in the first round of Battle of Los Angeles tournament	18:44
8	Mount Rushmore 2.0 (The Young Bucks (Matt Jackson and Nick Jackson) and Roderick Strong) defeated Euro Trash (Marty Scurll, Tommy End and Zack Sabre Jr.)	Six-man tag team match	26:42

Night 2 (August 29)
No.	Results	Stipulations	Times
1	Marty Scurll defeated Rich Swann	Singles match in the first round of Battle of Los Angeles tournament	11:18
2	Jack Evans defeated Angélico	Singles match in the first round of Battle of Los Angeles tournament	17:13
3	Chris Hero defeated Timothy Thatcher	Singles match in the first round of Battle of Los Angeles tournament	17:56
4	Aero Star and Fenix defeated Drago and Pentagon Jr.	Tag team match	15:55
5	Tommy End defeated Drew Gulak	Singles match in the first round of Battle of Los Angeles tournament	11:50
6	Mike Bailey defeated Drew Galloway	Singles match in the first round of Battle of Los Angeles tournament	17:48
7	Zack Sabre Jr. defeated Ricochet	Singles match in the first round of Battle of Los Angeles tournament	23:17
8	Mount Rushmore 2.0 (The Young Bucks (Matt Jackson and Nick Jackson) and Super Dragon) defeated Andrew Everett, Biff Busick and Trevor Lee	Guerrilla Warfare	16:36

Night 3 (August 30)
No.	Results	Stipulations	Times
1	Jack Evans defeated Brian Cage	Singles match in the quarter-final round of Battle of Los Angeles tournament	4:54
2	Chris Hero defeated Biff Busick	Singles match in the quarter-final round of Battle of Los Angeles tournament	8:51
3	Marty Scurll defeated Trevor Lee	Singles match in the quarter-final round of Battle of Los Angeles tournament	15:23
4	Zack Sabre Jr. defeated Pentagon Jr.	Singles match in the quarter-final round of Battle of Los Angeles tournament	12:34
5	Mike Bailey defeated Tommy End	Singles match in the quarter-final round of Battle of Los Angeles tournament	9:53
6	Will Ospreay defeated Matt Sydal	Singles match in the quarter-final round of Battle of Los Angeles tournament	15:30
7	Mount Rushmore 2.0 (The Young Bucks (Matt Jackson and Nick Jackson), Roderick Strong and Super Dragon) defeated Angélico, Fenix and The Inner City Machine Guns (Rich Swann and Ricochet)	Eight-man tag team match	19:00
8	Chris Hero defeated Jack Evans	Singles match in the semi-final round of Battle of Los Angeles tournament	15:26
9	Mike Bailey defeated Will Ospreay	Singles match in the semi-final round of Battle of Los Angeles tournament	11:11
10	Zack Sabre Jr. defeated Marty Scurll	Singles match in the semi-final round of Battle of Los Angeles tournament	29:07
11	Aero Star, Best Friends (Chuck Taylor and Trent), Drew Galloway and Drew Gulak defeated Andrew Everett, Drago, Mark Andrews, Timothy Thatcher and Tommaso Ciampa	Ten-man tag team match	22:50
12	Zack Sabre Jr. defeated Chris Hero and Mike Bailey (Note: Eliminations were as follows: Eliminated / Wrestler / Eliminated by / Elimination Method / Time; 1 / Mike Bailey / Chris Hero / Pinfall / 27:23; 2 / Chris Hero / Zack Sabre Jr. / Submission / 35:54; 3 / Winner: / Zack Sabre Jr.)	Three Way Elimination match in the Battle of Los Angeles tournament final	35:54

=== Tournament brackets ===
Battle of Los Angeles (2015)
Tournament information
- Sport: Professional wrestling
- Location: Reseda, Los Angeles, California
- Dates: August 28, 2015–August 30, 2015
- Tournament format: Single elimination tournament
- Participants: 24

Final positions
- Champion: Zack Sabre Jr.
- 1st runner-up: Chris Hero
- 2nd runner-up: Mike Bailey

First round
Aero Star	Pin
Brian Cage	6:52
Jack Evans	Pin
Angélico	17:13
Timothy Thatcher	Pin
Chris Hero	17:56
Andrew Everett	Pin
Biff Busick	14:19

Quarterfinals
Brian Cage	Pin
Jack Evans	4:54
Chris Hero	Pin
Biff Busick	8:51

Semifinals
Jack Evans	Pin
Chris Hero	15:26

First round
Trent?	Pin
Trevor Lee	14:20
Rich Swann	Sub
Marty Scurll	11:18
Pentagón Jr.	Pin
Drago	11:27
Zack Sabre Jr.	Pin
Ricochet	23:17

Quarterfinals
Trevor Lee	Sub
Marty Scurll	15:23
Pentagón Jr.	Sub
Zack Sabre Jr.	12:34

Semifinals
Marty Scurll	Sub
Zack Sabre Jr.	29:07

First round
Fénix	Pin
Matt Sydal	18:44
Will Ospreay	Pin
Mark Andrews	10:50
Mike Bailey	Pin
Drew Galloway	17:48
Drew Gulak	Pin
Tommy End	11:50

Quarterfinals
Matt Sydal	Pin
Will Ospreay	15:30
Mike Bailey	Pin
Tommy End	9:53

Semifinals
Will Ospreay	Pin
Mike Bailey	11:11

Final
Chris Hero	Win
Zack Sabre Jr. Mike Bailey	35:54
