= Mount Rushmore of Wrestling =

Stable
- Name(s): Mount Rushmore of Wrestling; Mount Rushmore 2.0
- Former members: Adam Cole; Kevin Steen; Matt Jackson; Nick Jackson; Roderick Strong; Super Dragon
- Debut: August 31, 2013
- Disbanded: September 3, 2016
- Years active: 2013–2016

Mount Rushmore of Wrestling or simply Mount Rushmore was a villainous professional wrestling faction in Pro Wrestling Guerrilla (PWG) from 2013 to 2016.

The original incarnation, led by Adam Cole, was formed at the 2013 Battle of Los Angeles, when Kevin Steen formed an alliance with Cole and The Young Bucks called Mount Rushmore. The faction dominated PWG throughout the year until Steen and Cole departed the promotion in August and December, respectively, in the following year.

The second incarnation of Mount Rushmore was formed at Mystery Vortex III, where Young Bucks made their surprise return to PWG from Japan and formed an alliance with Roderick Strong and the returning Super Dragon. Cole would later rejoin the group in December after making his surprise return to PWG during All Star Weekend 11. The group would disband quietly in 2016.

Mount Rushmore was a very influential faction in PWG and is widely considered the most famous stable in the promotion's history.

== Concept ==
In an interview on AEW Unrestricted, Adam Cole revealed that Kevin Steen was considering options of creating further ideas for his PWG career, so he pitched the idea of turning heel and forming a faction with Cole and The Young Bucks in PWG after having wrestled as a face for a very long time. Young Bucks called themselves the "Mount Rushmore of PWG" and the name "Mount Rushmore of Wrestling" stuck.

== History ==
=== Mount Rushmore (2013–2014) ===
The PWG World Champion Adam Cole and the PWG World Tag Team Champions The Young Bucks (Matt Jackson and Nick Jackson) were paired up to compete in six-man tag team matches at the 2013 Battle of Los Angeles. Cole and the Bucks defeated T.J. Perkins and Forever Hooligans (Alex Koslov and Rocky Romero) on the first night, and the team of AR Fox, Candice LeRae and Rich Swann on the second night. Later, Cole confronted his former Future Shock tag team partner Kyle O'Reilly after the latter won the 2013 Battle of Los Angeles tournament. Cole sarcastically congratulated O'Reilly on his win as "the second best member of Future Shock" which infuriated O'Reilly, who proceeded to attack Cole. Young Bucks rushed to attack O'Reilly. LeRae tried to make the save but was attacked as well. Joey Ryan confronted the Bucks and Cole on attacking LeRae claiming that only he had the right to attack LeRae and he prompted to attack Cole, which led to Bucks assaulting Ryan. Finally, the referee Rick Knox and Kevin Steen made the save but Steen turned into a villain by betraying Knox as he attacked him with a package piledriver. Steen delivered another package piledriver to LeRae and subsequently formed a new faction with Cole and the Bucks called Mount Rushmore.

PWG's following event Matt Rushmore was named after the group, where the new faction made its first appearance together by interrupting Excalibur and bullying him. At the event, Steen defeated ACH, while Young Bucks defended the World Tag Team Championship against Candice LeRae and Joey Ryan, who had formed an alliance after being attacked by Mount Rushmore at Battle of Los Angeles. Young Bucks retained the titles. Cole defended the World Championship against Battle of Los Angeles winner Kyle O'Reilly, and retained after assistance by Mount Rushmore. Mount Rushmore attacked O'Reilly after the match prompting several PWG wrestlers including Johnny Gargano to make the save. Gargano challenged Cole to a match for the World Championship, which was made official for the second night of All Star Weekend 10. On the first night of the All Star Weekend 10, Steen and the Bucks defeated AR Fox and The Inner City Machine Guns (Rich Swann and Ricochet). Later that night, the trio interfered in Cole's World Championship defense against Chris Hero and helped Cole in retaining the title. On the second night of the event, Steen and the Bucks lost a match to AR Fox, Candice LeRae and Rich Swann. However, the trio helped Cole in retaining the World Championship against Johnny Gargano in the main event.

Cole and Steen represented Mount Rushmore in the 2014 Dynamite Duumvirate Tag Team Title Tournament by participating under the team name Cole Steen Cole. The duo defeated Candice LeRae and Joey Ryan in the quarterfinals and Cole proceeded to spit LeRae in the face after the match. Later in the night, LeRae interfered in Cole Steen Cole's semifinal match against eventual winners Best Friends (Chuck Taylor and Trent?) and got her payback by spitting Cole in the face, allowing Best Friends to win. At Mystery Vortex II, Cole helped Young Bucks in retaining the World Tag Team Championship against Best Friends and then issued an open challenge for the World Championship, which was answered by LeRae. Cole defeated her to retain the title.

At Sold Our Souls For Rock 'n Roll, Steen and the Young Bucks defeated Cedric Alexander, Johnny Gargano and Trevor Lee. Later that night, the trio unsuccessfully interfered in Cole's World Championship title defense against Kyle O'Reilly in a Knockout or Submission only match, resulting in O'Reilly defeating Cole for the title. At Eleven, Cole failed to earn a World Championship title shot as he lost to Roderick Strong in a #1 contender's match, Steen wrestled his farewell match in PWG against Trevor Lee, which he lost, and the Young Bucks lost the World Tag Team Championship to The World's Cutest Tag Team (Candice LeRae and Joey Ryan) in a Guerrilla Warfare. After the match, Steen and Cole joined the Bucks for Steen's farewell. Cole and the Bucks turned on Steen by hitting him with a triple superkick. Steen subsequently left PWG to sign with WWE in August, thus leaving Mount Rushmore in the process.

Cole and the Bucks lost to Men of Low Moral Fiber (Chuck Taylor and Kenny Omega) and Zack Sabre Jr. on the first night of the 2014 Battle of Los Angeles. On the second night, Cole participated in the namesake tournament, losing to Sabre in the opening round while the Bucks defeated Bad Influence (Christopher Daniels and Frankie Kazarian) in the main event. On the third night, Cole and the Bucks defeated ACH, Brian Myers and Chris Sabin. At Untitled II, Cole lost to Trevor Lee in a shocking upset while the Bucks defeated African American Wolves (ACH and AR Fox). At Black Cole Sun, Cole wrestled his farewell match in PWG, in which he defeated Cedric Alexander, while the Bucks lost a match to Chris Sabin and Matt Sydal. Cole then departed PWG because Ring of Honor (ROH) began pulling its contracted wrestlers from competing on independent shows without the company's permission, which largely stemmed from the ROH World Champion Michael Elgin losing to Trevor Lee in the 2014 Battle of Los Angeles. Cole was among those contracted wrestlers and therefore could not appear in PWG. It temporarily disbanded Mount Rushmore.

=== Mount Rushmore 2.0 (2015–2016) ===
After a four-month absence, the Young Bucks made a surprise return to PWG at Mystery Vortex III on June 26, 2015, by interrupting the new World Tag Team Champions Andrew Everett and Trevor Lee and challenging them to an immediate title match. The World Champion Roderick Strong interfered in the match and helped Young Bucks in defeating Everett and Lee to win the World Tag Team Championship. Strong and the Bucks fended off attacks by The World's Cutest Tag Team, Johnny Gargano and referee Rick Knox until Super Dragon made his surprise return to PWG apparently to rescue Knox. However, Dragon instead turned on Knox and delivered a Psycho Driver to Knox and put on a Mount Rushmore 2.0 shirt. Dragon then proceeded to attack Excalibur, Candice LeRae, Everett, Lee, Biff Busick and Mike Bailey. Strong then announced the formation of the new Mount Rushmore with Dragon and the Bucks.

At Threemendous IV, Super Dragon attacked Ricochet after the latter's win over Akira Tozawa. Joey Ryan, Candice LeRae and Johnny Gargano tried to make the save but Young Bucks aided Dragon in attacking them which culminated with Dragon hitting a curb stomp to LeRae into the turnbuckle. Mike Bailey and Akira Tozawa tried to make the save but were attacked until Los Güeros del Cielo (Angélico and Jack Evans) made the save. Bucks then successfully defended the World Tag Team Championship against Angélico and Evans. At the first night of the 2015 Battle of Los Angeles, Strong and the Bucks defeated Euro Trash (Marty Scurll, Tommy End and Zack Sabre Jr.). On the night two, Dragon and the Bucks defeated Andrew Everett, Biff Busick and Trevor Lee in a Guerrilla Warfare. On the third night, the entire Mount Rushmore faction defeated Angélico, Fenix and Inner City Machine Guns in an eight-man tag team match. Dragon was injured in the match, forcing him to retire.

On the first night of All Star Weekend 11, Bucks successfully defended the World Tag Team Championship against Johnny Gargano and Tommaso Ciampa, while Strong retained the World Championship against Matt Sydal. On the second night, Mount Rushmore was scheduled to take on Chris Hero, Mike Bailey and The World's Cutest Tag Team in a Guerrilla Warfare but Super Dragon was unable to compete due to injury. Adam Cole made his surprise return to PWG and substituted for Dragon, thus rejoining Mount Rushmore. However, Mount Rushmore went on to lose the match. Strong hesitated to make friends with Cole but accepted him in the group. At Lëmmy, Cole defeated Mike Bailey while Strong retained the World Championship against Chris Hero. At Bowie, Cole defeated Andrew Everett and Strong retained the World Championship against Drew Galloway.

On the first night of All Star Weekend 12, Strong defeated Mark Andrews in a non-title match, Cole lost to Strong's #1 contender Zack Sabre Jr., and the Bucks retained the World Tag Team Championship against Matt Sydal and Ricochet. On the second night, Cole lost to Trent?, Bucks retained the tag team titles against reDRagon (Bobby Fish and Kyle O'Reilly) and Strong lost the World Championship to Sabre. At Prince, Cole defeated Dalton Castle and Strong defeated Sami Callihan.

At Thirteen, Cole defeated Brian Cage, the Bucks retained the World Tag Team Championship against Death By Elbow (Chris Hero and JT Dunn) and Strong failed to regain the World Championship from Zack Sabre Jr. in a no disqualification match. It was Strong's farewell match in PWG as he departed the promotion to sign with WWE. Strong held a farewell celebration with Cole and the Bucks, who were about to turn on him just like they turned on Steen two years prior at Eleven but Sabre made the save.

On the first night of the 2016 Battle of Los Angeles, Cole and the Bucks defeated Dalton Castle and reDRagon. On the second night, Cole and the Bucks lost to Matt Sydal, Ricochet and Will Ospreay in a match which received unanimous praise from wrestling critics. Dave Meltzer of the Wrestling Observer Newsletter awarded it the prestigious 5-star rating and SoCal Uncensored readers voted it the 2016 Southern California Match of the Year. This was the last mention of Mount Rushmore in PWG.

Cole and the Bucks would team together the next time in PWG at Only Kings Understand Each Other by using the name Superkliq, a sub-group of The Elite, thus quietly disbanding Mount Rushmore.

== Championships and accomplishments ==
- Pro Wrestling Guerrilla
  - PWG World Championship (2 times) – Cole (1), Strong (1)
  - PWG World Tag Team Championship (2 times) – Matt Jackson and Nick Jackson
- SoCal Uncensored
  - Southern California Match of the Year Award (2016) – Adam Cole and The Young Bucks vs. Matt Sydal, Ricochet and Will Ospreay at Battle of Los Angeles
  - Southern California Tag Team of the Year Award (2014, 2015) – The Young Bucks
  - Southern California Wrestler of the Year Award (2013) – Adam Cole
- Wrestling Observer Newsletter
  - Best Wrestling Maneuver (2014) – The Young Bucks' Meltzer Driver
  - Tag Team of the Year (2014–2016) – The Young Bucks
