= PWG All Star Weekend =

Annual supercard event by PWG

- Promotions: Pro Wrestling Guerrilla
- First event: All Star Weekend 1

All Star Weekend is a major professional wrestling event produced by Pro Wrestling Guerrilla (PWG). It is a two-night event which is held during the weekend on Saturday and Sunday.

== Dates, venues and main events ==
#	Event	Date	City	Venue	Main event
1	All Star Weekend	April 1, 2005	Los Angeles, California	Hollywood-Los Feliz Jewish Community Centre	Super Dragon (c) vs. El Generico vs. Kevin Steen in a three way dance for the PWG Championship
1	All Star Weekend	April 2, 2005	Los Angeles, California	Hollywood-Los Feliz Jewish Community Centre	Super Dragon (c) vs. AJ Styles for the PWG Championship
2	All Star Weekend 2: Electric Boogaloo	November 18, 2005	Los Angeles, California	Hollywood-Los Feliz Jewish Community Centre	Kevin Steen (c) vs. Samoa Joe for the PWG Championship
2	All Star Weekend 2: Electric Boogaloo	November 19, 2005	Los Angeles, California	Hollywood-Los Feliz Jewish Community Centre	Kevin Steen (c) vs. Chris Bosh for the PWG Championship
3	All Star Weekend 3: Crazymania	April 8, 2006	Los Angeles, California	Hollywood-Los Feliz Jewish Community Centre	Joey Ryan (c) vs. Chris Bosh and Super Dragon in a three way dance for the PWG Championship
3	All Star Weekend 3: Crazymania	April 9, 2006	Los Angeles, California	Hollywood-Los Feliz Jewish Community Centre	Davey Richards and Super Dragon (c) vs. Cape Fear (El Generico and Quicksilver) for the PWG World Tag Team Championship
4	All Star Weekend IV	November 17, 2006	Reseda, California	American Legion Post #308	The PWG-Unit (El Generico, Frankie Kazarian, Human Tornado and Quicksilver) vs. The Dynasty (Chris Bosh, Joey Ryan, Scorpio Sky and Scott Lost)
4	All Star Weekend IV	November 18, 2006	Reseda, California	American Legion Post #308	Davey Richards and Roderick Strong (c) vs. B-Boy and Super Dragon vs. The Kings of Wrestling (Chris Hero and Claudio Castagnoli) vs. The Motor City Machine Guns (Alex Shelley and Chris Sabin) in a four-way match for the PWG World Tag Team Championship
5	All Star Weekend V	April 7, 2007	Van Nuys, California	Van Nuys Armory	El Generico (c) vs. PAC for the PWG World Championship
5	All Star Weekend V	April 8, 2007	Van Nuys, California	Van Nuys Armory	Low Ki vs. Samoa Joe
6	All Star Weekend 6	January 5, 2008	Van Nuys, California	Van Nuys Armory	Claudio Castagnoli, Eddie Kingston and Human Tornado vs. Candice LeRae, Chris Hero and Necro Butcher
6	All Star Weekend 6	January 6, 2008	Van Nuys, California	Van Nuys Armory	Bryan Danielson vs. CIMA
7	All Star Weekend 7	August 30, 2008	Reseda, California	American Legion Post #308	Chris Hero (c) vs. Eddie Kingston vs. Low Ki vs. Necro Butcher in a four-way match for the PWG World Championship
7	All Star Weekend 7	August 31, 2008	Reseda, California	American Legion Post #308	Chris Hero (c) vs. PAC for the PWG World Championship
8	All Star Weekend 8	May 27, 2011	Reseda, California	American Legion Post #308	Claudio Castagnoli (c) vs. Chris Hero for the PWG World Championship
8	All Star Weekend 8	May 28, 2011	Reseda, California	American Legion Post #308	Claudio Castagnoli (c) vs. Low Ki for the PWG World Championship
9	All Star Weekend 9	March 22, 2013	Reseda, California	American Legion Post #308	Drake Younger vs. Sami Callihan in a Guerrilla Warfare in Match Three of the Best of Three Series to determine the #1 contender for the PWG World Championship on night two
9	All Star Weekend 9	March 23, 2013	Reseda, California	American Legion Post #308	Adam Cole (c) vs. Drake Younger for the PWG World Championship
10	All Star Weekend 10	December 20, 2013	Reseda, California	American Legion Post #308	Adam Cole (c) vs. Chris Hero for the PWG World Championship
10	All Star Weekend 10	December 21, 2013	Reseda, California	American Legion Post #308	Adam Cole (c) vs. Johnny Gargano for the PWG World Championship
11	All Star Weekend 11	December 11, 2015	Reseda, California	American Legion Post #308	Roderick Strong (c) vs. Matt Sydal for the PWG World Championship
11	All Star Weekend 11	December 12, 2015	Reseda, California	American Legion Post #308	Chris Hero, Mike Bailey and The World's Cutest Tag Team (Candice LeRae and Joey Ryan) vs. Mount Rushmore 2.0 (Adam Cole, Matt Jackson, Nick Jackson and Roderick Strong) in a Guerrilla Warfare
12	All Star Weekend 12	March 4, 2016	Reseda, California	American Legion Post #308	The Young Bucks (Matt Jackson and Nick Jackson) (c) vs. Matt Sydal and Ricochet for the PWG World Tag Team Championship
12	All Star Weekend 12	March 5, 2016	Reseda, California	American Legion Post #308	Roderick Strong (c) vs. Zack Sabre Jr. for the PWG World Championship
13	All Star Weekend 13	October 20, 2017	Reseda, California	American Legion Post #308	The Lucha Brothers (Penta el 0M and Rey Fenix) (c) vs. The Chosen Bros (Jeff Cobb and Matthew Riddle)
13	All Star Weekend 13	October 21, 2017	Reseda, California	American Legion Post #308	Chuck Taylor (c) vs. Ricochet for the PWG World Championship
14	All Star Weekend 14	April 20, 2018	Reseda, California	American Legion Post #308	The Chosen Bros (Jeff Cobb and Matthew Riddle) (c) vs. The Rascalz (Dezmond Xavier and Zachary Wentz) vs. The Young Bucks (Matt Jackson and Nick Jackson) in a three-way match for the PWG World Tag Team Championship
14	All Star Weekend 14	April 21, 2018	Reseda, California	American Legion Post #308	Keith Lee (c) vs. Jonah Rock vs. WALTER in a three-way match for the PWG World Championship

== Results ==
=== All Star Weekend 1 ===
All Star Weekend 1
- Promotion: Pro Wrestling Guerrilla
- Date: Night One: April 1, 2005; Night Two: April 2, 2005
- City: Los Angeles, California
- Venue: Hollywood-Los Feliz Jewish Community Centre
- Attendance: Night One: c. 450; Night Two: c. 375; Combined: c. 825

Event chronology
← Previous; The Ernest P. Worrell Memorial	Next → Jason Takes PWG

All Star Weekend chronology
← Previous; First	Next → 2

Background

On March 24, 2005, PWG announced that the two-night All Star Weekend event would take place on April 1 and April 2.

Storylines

A four-way dance was scheduled to take place between AJ Styles, Christopher Daniels, El Generico and Kevin Steen at the All Star Weekend, to determine the #1 contender for the PWG Championship, but it was pushed back to The Ernest P. Worrell Memorial, with the winner scheduled to face Super Dragon for the title later in the main event. Tony Stradlin was originally supposed to be Dragon's challenger for the title but Stradlin signed a developmental contract with WWE, thus forcing him to leave PWG. Steen would win the four-way and unsuccessfully challenge Dragon for the title later in the night. Later, it was announced that Dragon would defend the PWG Championship against Generico and Steen in a three-way dance on the first night of All Star Weekend.

At All Nude Revue, Arrogance (Chris Bosh and Scott Lost) interfered in Frankie Kazarian's match against Tony Stradlin, thus costing Kazarian the match. Later that night, Arrogance retained the PWG Tag Team Championship against The Aerial Express (Quicksilver and Scorpio Sky). At The Ernest P. Worrell Memorial, Kazarian teamed with Lost's former X Foundation teammate Joey Ryan to challenge Arrogance for the Tag Team Championship, but lost the match after Kazarian prevented Ryan from using a steel chair in the match. Ryan turned on Kazarian after the match by attacking him and forming an alliance with Bosh and Lost, thus joining Arrogance. He berated the fans for cheering him over Lost, which would lead to the abandoning of Lost and Ryan's previous alliance X-Foundation in the first place. It was later announced that Kazarian would team with Aerial Express to take on Arrogance in a six-man tag team match on the first night of All Star Weekend.

In other major matches on the first night of All Star Weekend, Christopher Daniels would defend the TNA X Division Championship against Alex Shelley, James Gibson would make his PWG debut against American Dragon and AJ Styles would face Samoa Joe to determine the #1 contender for the PWG Championship, with the winner getting a title shot on night two.

Night One

The first night of All Star Weekend kicked off with an eight-man tag team match, in which Los Luchas (Phoenix Star and Zokre) and S.B.S. (Disco Machine and Excalibur) took on Hook Bomberry, Ronin, Top Gun Talwar and the debuting Davey Richards. Richards delivered a shooting star press to Excalibur for the win.

Next, Chris Hero took on Chris Sabin. Hero targeted Sabin's arm while Sabin tried to deliver a Cradle Shock to Hero and Hero applied a Hangman's Clutch II on Sabin to make him submit for the win.

Next, Jonny Storm took on Petey Williams. Storm blocked a Canadian Destroyer attempt by Williams and delivered a hurricanrana to Williams for the win.

Next, The Havana Pitbulls (Ricky Reyes and Rocky Romero) took on Kendo Kashin and Puma. Romero pinned Puma with a roll-up after dropkicking him into the corner.

Next, James Gibson made his PWG debut against American Dragon. Dragon countered a Gibson Driver attempt by Gibson into a roll-up but Gibson countered it into his own roll-up and pinned Dragon for the win.

Next, Arrogance (Chris Bosh, Joey Ryan and Scott Lost) took on Frankie Kazarian and The Aerial Express (Quicksilver and Scorpio Sky) in a six-man tag team match. Bosh accidentally hit Lost in the ring, allowing Kazarian to deliver Wave of the Futures to both men for the win.

Next, Christopher Daniels defended the TNA X Division Championship against Alex Shelley. Daniels pinned Shelley with a roll-up to retain the title. Daniels issued an open challenge for the X Division Championship after the match for night two, which Chris Hero answered and Daniels accepted Hero's challenge.

Next, AJ Styles took on Samoa Joe to determine the #1 contender for the PWG Championship on the second night. Styles countered a muscle buster by Joe into a Styles Clash for the win.

It was followed by the main event, in which Super Dragon defended the PWG Championship against El Generico and Kevin Steen in a three-way match. Dragon delivered a Psycho Driver to Generico to retain the title.

No.	Results	Stipulations	Times
1	Davey Richards, Gunning For Hookers (Hook Bomberry and Top Gun Talwar) and Ronin defeated Los Luchas (Phoenix Star and Zokre) and S.B.S. (Disco Machine and Excalibur)	Eight-man tag team match	11:01
2	Chris Hero defeated Chris Sabin	Singles match	14:48
3	Jonny Storm defeated Petey Williams (with Scott D'Amore)	Singles match	13:38
4	The Havana Pitbulls (Ricky Reyes and Rocky Romero) defeated Kendo Kashin and Puma	Tag team match	16:19
5	James Gibson defeated American Dragon	Singles match	20:52
6	Frankie Kazarian and The Aerial Express (Quicksilver and Scorpio Sky) (with Dino Winwood) defeated Arrogance (Chris Bosh, Joey Ryan and Scott Lost)	Six-man tag team match	18:20
7	Christopher Daniels (c) defeated Alex Shelley	Singles match for the TNA X Division Championship	12:53
8	AJ Styles defeated Samoa Joe	Singles match to determine the #1 contender for the PWG Championship on night two	19:59
9	Super Dragon (c) defeated El Generico and Kevin Steen	Three Way Dance for the PWG Championship	18:30
(c) / – the champion(s) heading into the match

Night Two

The night two began with a four-way elimination match between Davey Richards, Puma, Ricky Reyes and Ronin. Richards scored the first elimination by pinning Ronin after Reyes delivered a clothesline to Ronin. Next, Puma applied a crossface on Richards after Richards missed a shooting star press. Puma made him submit for the elimination. Reyes delivered a neckbreaker and a brainbuster to Puma for the win.

Next, Gunning For Hookers took on S.B.S. Excalibur avoided an enzuigiri by Bomberry and delivered a German suplex and a double underhook powerbomb to Bomberry for the win.

Next, Petey Williams took on Joey Ryan. PWG commissioner SoCal Val ejected Ryan's Arrogance teammates from the ringside due to interfering in the match. Williams countered an armbar by Ryan and delivered a Canadian Destroyer to Ryan for the win.

Next, El Generico and Los Luchas took on Human Tornado and The Aerial Express. Zokre delivered a big boot to Quicksilver, allowing Generico to hit a brainbuster for the win.

Next, Christopher Daniels defended the TNA X Division Championship against Chris Hero. Hero injured his leg after missing a double stomp on Daniels, allowing Daniels to deliver an Angel's Wings to Hero to retain the title.

Next, Jonny Storm took on Kevin Steen. Steen crotched Storm on the top rope and delivered a package piledriver to Storm for the win.

Next, Chris Bosh and Scott Lost defended the PWG Tag Team Championship against Chris Sabin and Frankie Kazarian. It was Kazarian's last match in PWG due to signing a contract with WWE. Joey Ryan interfered in the match until Petey Williams showed up to prevent Ryan from interfering. Lost knocked Sabin with a leg lariat and sat on top of Kazarian's victory roll attempt to win the match and retain the titles.

It was followed by the main event, in which Super Dragon defended the PWG Championship against AJ Styles. Styles delivered a discus clothesline to Dragon to win the title.

No.	Results	Stipulations	Times
1	Ricky Reyes defeated Davey Richards, Puma and Ronin	Four-Way Elimination match	8:12
2	S.B.S. (Disco Machine and Excalibur) defeated Gunning For Hookers (Hook Bomberry and Top Gun Talwar)	Tag team match	12:14
3	Petey Williams (with Scott D'Amore) defeated Joey Ryan (with Chris Bosh and Scott Lost)	Singles match	13:06
4	El Generico and Los Luchas (Phoenix Star and Zokre) defeated Human Tornado and The Aerial Express (Quicksilver and Scorpio Sky) (with Dino Winwood)	Six-man tag team match	13:57
5	Christopher Daniels (c) defeated Chris Hero	Singles match for the TNA X Division Championship	19:09
6	Kevin Steen defeated Jonny Storm	Singles match	15:50
7	Arrogance (Chris Bosh and Scott Lost) (c) defeated Chris Sabin and Frankie Kazarian	Tag team match for the PWG Tag Team Championship	11:54
8	AJ Styles defeated Super Dragon (c)	Singles match for the PWG Championship	19:34
(c) / – the champion(s) heading into the match

Aftermath

Frankie Kazarian would return to PWG for one night at the 2nd Annual PWG Bicentennial Birthday Extravaganza, where he wrestled AJ Styles to a match for the PWG Championship, which ended in a draw. Kazarian would then compete in WWE for a month, before making his full-time return to PWG at Smells Like Steen Spirit.

The rivalry between Aerial Express and Arrogance continued as Aerial Express defeated Los Luchas to become the #1 contenders for the Tag Team Championship at Guitarmageddon. Aerial Express earned another opportunity against Arrogance for the titles in a masks versus title match at 2nd Annual PWG Bicentennial Birthday Extravaganza, where Aerial Express defeated Arrogance to win the titles.

=== All Star Weekend 2 ===
All Star Weekend 2: Electric Boogaloo
- Promotion: Pro Wrestling Guerrilla
- Date: Night One: November 18, 2005; Night Two: November 19, 2005
- City: Los Angeles, California
- Venue: Hollywood-Los Feliz Jewish Community Centre
- Attendance: Night One: c. 400; Night Two: c. 300; Combined: c. 700

Event chronology
← Previous; Straight To DVD	Next → Chanukah Chaos (The C's Are Silent)

All Star Weekend chronology
← Previous; 1	Next → 3

Background

It was announced that the two-night event All Star Weekend 2: Electric Boogaloo, would be held at the Hollywood-Los Feliz Jewish Community Centre in Los Angeles, California on November 18 and November 19, 2005.

Storylines

At 2nd Annual PWG Bicentennial Birthday Extravaganza, Arrogance (Chris Bosh and Scott Lost) attacked The Aerial Express (Quicksilver and Scorpio Sky) after Aerial Express defeated Arrogance in a masks versus title match to win the PWG Tag Team Championship. Arrogance brutally attacked Sky and removed his mask thus violating the pre-match stipulation. As a result, Sky was injured and the titles were vacated. Arrogance would also begin feuding with PWG management due to their attacks on referees and disobedience of PWG commissioners SoCal Val and Dino Winwood's orders and Winwood would often get involved in physical altercations with Joey Ryan. Sky returned from his injury at Battle of Los Angeles and attacked Lost after Lost attacked the referee due to losing to Christopher Daniels in the opening round of the Battle of Los Angeles tournament. At After School Special, Lost defeated Sky by knocking him out with the brass knuckles. Also at the event, Ryan challenged Winwood to a match. At Straight To DVD, Winwood refused to wrestle Ryan but vowed to take care of Arrogance's antics. Later that night, Lost and Ryan attacked Sky after Sky defeated Christopher Daniels in a match. Winwood fired Lost and Ryan from PWG and gave Sky, the option to choose any match which he wanted. Sky convinced Winwood to rehire Arrogance and said he wanted Aerial Express and Winwood to take on Arrogance at All Star Weekend 2. Winwood rehired Arrogance and made the match official. A rematch from After School Special between Lost and Sky was also made official for the second night of All Star Weekend.

Title matches were announced for both nights of All Star Weekend; on the first night, Kevin Steen would defend the PWG Championship against Samoa Joe and the team of Davey Richards and Super Dragon would defend the PWG Tag Team Championship against Gunning For Hookers (Hook Bomberry and Top Gun Talwar); on the second night, Steen would defend the title against Chris Bosh if he retained on the first night and Richards and Dragon would defend the Tag Team Championship against Disco Machine and Excalibur if they retained on the first night.

Night One

The event kicked off with a tag team match, in which Rocky Romero and TJ Perkins took on S.B.S. (Disco Machine and Excalibur). Perkins initially made Excalibur tap out to a single legged Boston crab while the referee was distracted as Perkins sent Machine out to the ringside. Perkins proceeded to deliver a frog splash to Excalibur but the referee counted him out for staying on top rope for too long.

Next, Chris Sabin took on Petey Williams. Williams reversed a crucifix attempt by Sabin by using the ropes for leverage and pinned Sabin for the win.

Next, Christopher Daniels took on Frankie Kazarian. Kazarian rolled through a diving crossbody attempt by Daniels to pin him for the win.

In the next match, Davey Richards and Super Dragon were scheduled to defend the PWG Tag Team Championship against Gunning For Hookers (Hook Bomberry and Top Gun Talwar) but Gunning For Hookers were suspended for failing their drug tests. As a result, they were replaced by B-Boy and Ronin as Richards and Dragon's opponents in a non-title match. Richards delivered a shooting star press to Ronin for the win.

Next, Jack Evans took on El Generico. Evans delivered a 630° senton to Generico for the win.

Next, American Dragon took on Jimmy Yang. Yang delivered a Yang Time to Dragon for the win.

It was followed by the penultimate match, a six-man tag team match, in which Arrogance (Chris Bosh, Joey Ryan and Scott Lost) took on Dino Winwood and The Aerial Express (Quicksilver and Scorpio Sky). Winwood delivered a Duff Drop to Ryan with assistance from Sky for the win.

Next was the main event in which Kevin Steen defended the PWG Championship against Samoa Joe. Steen countered a Samoan drop with a crucifix and pinned Joe to retain the title.

No.	Results	Stipulations	Times
1	Disco Machine and Excalibur defeated Rocky Romero and TJ Perkins by count-out	Tag team match	15:12
2	Petey Williams defeated Chris Sabin	Singles match	15:29
3	Frankie Kazarian defeated Christopher Daniels	Singles match	12:47
4	Davey Richards and Super Dragon defeated B-Boy and Ronin	Tag team match	24:06
5	Jack Evans defeated El Generico	Singles match	18:14
6	Jimmy Yang defeated American Dragon	Singles match	20:47
7	Dino Winwood and The Aerial Express (Quicksilver and Scorpio Sky) defeated Arrogance (Chris Bosh, Joey Ryan and Scott Lost)	Six-man tag team match	21:26
8	Kevin Steen (c) defeated Samoa Joe	Singles match for the PWG Championship	17:36
(c) / – the champion(s) heading into the match

Night Two

The night two kicked off with a tag team match, in which Human Tornado and TJ Perkins took on Alex Koslov and Ronin. Perkins applied a crossface on Koslov but was not legal, so the legally tagged Tornado applied a chinlock on Koslov to make him submit for the win.

Next, Jack Evans took on Joey Ryan. Ryan delivered a Northern Lights suplex to Evans and pinned him by putting his feet on the ropes for leverage.

Next, Scorpio Sky took on Scott Lost. Lost applied a Sharpshooter on Sky after hitting him with a steel chair. Sky was unable to get out of the hold for so long, so Dino Winwood threw a towel in the ring on Sky's behalf and the referee awarded the win to Lost.

Next, Super Dragon and Davey Richards defended the PWG Tag Team Championship against Disco Machine and Excalibur. Machine and Excalibur's New SBS teammate Kevin Steen interfered in the match on the team's behalf but Dragon managed to deliver a Supernatural Driver to Excalibur to retain the titles. Steen attacked Dragon after the match by hitting him with a package piledriver on a chair and hit Richards in the leg with that chair.

Next, Jimmy Yang took on Rocky Romero. Yang delivered a Yang Time to Romero for the win.

Next, B-Boy took on El Generico. B-Boy hit a shining wizard and a Delikado to Generico for the win.

Next, Chris Sabin and Frankie Kazarian took on Petey Williams and Hardkore Kidd. Sabin knocked Kidd out of the ring with a suicide dive, allowing Kazarian to deliver a Flux Capacitor to Williams from the top rope for the win.

It was followed by the main event, in which Kevin Steen defended the PWG Championship against Chris Bosh. Scott Lost and Joey Ryan interfered in the match on Bosh's behalf but Ryan turned on Bosh by delivering a That 70's Kick. Steen delivered a package piledriver to Bosh from the top rope to retain the title.

No.	Results	Stipulations	Times
1	Human Tornado and TJ Perkins (with Jade Chung) defeated Alex Koslov and Ronin	Tag team match	15:09
2	Joey Ryan defeated Jack Evans	Singles match	12:13
3	Scott Lost defeated Scorpio Sky	Singles match	14:44
4	Davey Richards and Super Dragon (c) defeated Disco Machine and Excalibur	Tag team match for the PWG Tag Team Championship	22:35
5	Jimmy Yang defeated Rocky Romero	Singles match	11:30
6	B-Boy defeated El Generico	Singles match	21:44
7	Chris Sabin and Frankie Kazarian defeated Hardkore Kidd and Petey Williams (with El Jefe)	Tag team match	17:17
8	Kevin Steen (c) defeated Chris Bosh	Singles match for the PWG Championship	20:37
(c) / – the champion(s) heading into the match

Aftermath

Joey Ryan was announced as Kevin Steen's next challenger for the PWG Championship at Chanukah Chaos (The C's Are Silent). At the event, Chris Bosh avenged the betrayal from Ryan by hitting the latter with a chair. However, Steen's rival Super Dragon interfered in the match by hitting two Psycho Drivers to Steen and Ryan pinned Steen to win the title. At Cruisin For A Bruisin, Bosh defeated Scott Lost to earn a title shot against Ryan and began a feud with Ryan. Bosh unsuccessfully challenged Ryan for the title on various occasions throughout the year. Arrogance reunited with Ryan after Ryan helped them in defeating Davey Richards and Super Dragon to win the PWG Tag Team Championship at Enchantment Under The Sea, so the three formed a new faction called The Dynasty with Scorpio Sky.

The feud between Scorpio Sky and Scott Lost continued as the two competed in an "I Quit" match at Chanukah Chaos (The C's Are Silent), which Sky won.

Super Dragon and Davey Richards continued their feud with New SBS as the two teams had a rematch for the PWG Tag Team Championship at Chanukah Chaos (The C's Are Silent). The match ended in a no contest after Kevin Steen attacked Dragon, leading to a Guerrilla Warfare between the two at Astonishing X-Mas, which Dragon won.

=== All Star Weekend 3 ===
All Star Weekend 3: Crazymania
- Promotion: Pro Wrestling Guerrilla
- Date: Night One: April 8, 2006; Night Two: April 9, 2006
- City: Los Angeles, California
- Venue: Hollywood-Los Feliz Jewish Community Centre
- Attendance: Night One: c. 375; Night Two: c. 325; Combined: c. 700

Event chronology
← Previous; Beyond The Thunderdome	Next → (Please Don't Call It) The O.C.

All Star Weekend chronology
← Previous; 2	Next → IV

Background

It was announced that All Star Weekend 3: Crazymania would be held at the Hollywood-Los Feliz Jewish Community Centre in Los Angeles, California, taking place across two nights on April 8 and April 9, 2006.

Storylines

At European Vacation: England, Arrogance (Chris Bosh and Scott Lost) failed to win the PWG World Tag Team Championship from Super Dragon and Davey Richards. Dragon insulted them after the match by slapping them and refusing to shake hands with them. It led to Bosh creating "A Treatise On Those Jerks, Joey Ryan & Super Dragon". He read a few lines of the treatise in which he insulted Dragon and the PWG World Champion Joey Ryan at Hollywood Globetrotters. It would lead to Ryan interfering in Bosh's match and attacking his opponent, causing Bosh to lose by disqualification. Ryan and Dragon then attacked Bosh after the match and brawled with each other afterwards. As a result, the PWG Commissioner Dino Winwood announced that Ryan would defend the World Championship against Bosh and Dragon in a Three Way Dance on the first night of All Star Weekend 3. Winwood also announced a surprise opponent for Ryan on the second night, with the World Championship on the line if Ryan was able to retain the title on the first night, otherwise, it would remain a non-title match.

At Beyond The Thunderdome, B-Boy defeated Kevin Steen to become the #1 contender for the World Championship. Steen complained that he lost because of Joey Ryan's assault on him earlier in the night. Later that night, Ryan cheated to defeat Chris Sabin to retain the World Championship. All of Ryan's challengers complained that he cheated in his matches to retain the title, forcing Dino Winwood to announce an eight-man tournament to determine Ryan's #1 contender for the title. He announced that the first four matches of the tournament would take place on the first night of All Star Weekend, while the tournament final, a Four Way match would take place on the second night.

At Hollywood Globetrotters, Cape Fear (El Generico and Quicksilver) defeated Arrogance via disqualification in a Suck My Cock match to determine the #1 contenders for the World Tag Team Championship, after Joey Ryan attacked Generico to get Chris Bosh disqualified as part of Ryan's feud with Bosh. It led to a rematch between Cape Fear and Arrogance at Beyond The Thunderdome, which Cape Fear won to become the #1 contenders for the World Tag Team Championship. It was announced that Cape Fear would challenge Super Dragon and Davey Richards for the tag team titles on the second night of All Star Weekend, and would be facing Los Luchas (Phoenix Star and Zokre) on the first night.

Night One

The first night of All Star Weekend kicked off with a tag team match pitting Bino Gambino and Top Gun Talwar defeated Alex Koslov and Ronin. Gambino delivered a double underhook slam to Koslov for the win.

Next, M-Dogg 20 took on TJ Perkins. M-Dogg hit a big boot and a shooting star press to Perkins for the win.

The next match was scheduled to be a tag team match between The Kings of Wrestling (Chris Hero and Claudio Castagnoli) and The Briscoe Brothers (Jay and Mark). However, Briscoes were unable to attend the event and were replaced by Disco Machine and Nemesis. Kings of Wrestling delivered a Hero's Welcome Kings of Wrestling Edition to Machine for the win.

It was followed by a tournament to determine the #1 contender for the PWG World Championship, with the first match taking place between B-Boy and Excalibur. B-Boy delivered a fireman's carry into a knee strike to Excalibur for the win.

In the next tournament match, Kevin Steen took on Matt Sydal. Sydal tried to counter a package piledriver attempt by Steen into a hurricanrana but Steen managed to roll through and deliver a package piledriver to Steen for the win.

Next, Chris Sabin took on Scorpio Sky. Sabin delivered a Cradle Shock to Sky for the win.

It was followed by the last match in the first round of the #1 contender's tournament between Frankie Kazarian and Jimmy Yang. Scorpio Sky interfered in the match and distracted Kazarian, allowing Yang to deliver a hurricanrana from the top rope. Yang followed it by attempting to hit a Yang Time but Kazarian avoided it and delivered a Wave of the Future to Yang for the win.

Next was the penultimate match, in which Cape Fear (El Generico and Quicksilver) took on Los Luchas (Phoenix Star and Zokre). Star hit a handstand kick to Quicksilver but Generico made the save by hitting a running big boot, a half and half suplex and a second running big boot, allowing Quicksilver to deliver a Silver Bullet to Star for the win.

Next was a three-way dance in the main event, in which Joey Ryan defended the PWG World Championship against Chris Bosh and Super Dragon. Dragon knocked out Bosh with a forearm smash. Ryan then delivered a powerbomb to Dragon and tossed him out of the ring. Ryan went out of the ring to follow Dragon but Dragon raked him in the eye, removed the protective padding from the floor and delivered a Psycho Driver to Ryan on the exposed floor. Dragon rolled Bosh into the ring and Ryan delivered a That 70's Kick to Dragon outside the ring and pinned Bosh to retain the title.

No.	Results	Stipulations	Times
1	Bino Gambino and Top Gun Talwar defeated Alex Koslov and Ronin	Tag team match	14:23
2	M-Dogg 20 defeated TJ Perkins	Singles match	11:18
3	The Kings of Wrestling (Chris Hero and Claudio Castagnoli) defeated Disco Machine and Nemesis	Tag team match	14:53
4	B-Boy defeated Excalibur	Singles match in the tournament to determine the #1 contender for the PWG World Championship	13:21
5	Kevin Steen defeated Matt Sydal	Singles match in the tournament to determine the #1 contender for the PWG World Championship	19:57
6	Chris Sabin defeated Scorpio Sky (with Jade Chung)	Singles match in the tournament to determine the #1 contender for the PWG World Championship	22:34
7	Frankie Kazarian defeated Jimmy Yang	Singles match in the tournament to determine the #1 contender for the PWG World Championship	12:14
8	Cape Fear (El Generico and Quicksilver) defeated Los Luchas (Phoenix Star and Zokre)	Tag team match	17:13
9	Joey Ryan (c) defeated Chris Bosh and Super Dragon	Three Way Dance for the PWG World Championship	16:12
(c) / – the champion(s) heading into the match

Night Two

The second night of All Star Weekend 3 kicked off with a tag team match, pitting Bino Gambino and Top Gun Talwar against Disco Machine and Excalibur. Excalibur delivered a heart punch and a Tiger Driver '98 to Talwar for the win.

Next, Ronin took on Phoenix Star. Ronin countered a headscissors takedown attempt by Star into a Death Valley driver for the win.

Next, a Four Way match occurred between B-Boy, Chris Sabin, Frankie Kazarian and Kevin Steen to determine the #1 contender for the PWG World Championship. Kazarian almost won the match by delivering a kneeling back-to-belly piledriver to Steen and covered him for the pinfall until Scorpio Sky interfered in the match and pulled the referee out of the ring. As a result, Kazarian brawled with Sky. The distraction allowed B-Boy to deliver a fireman's carry into a knee strike to Sabin for the win.

Next, Roderick Strong took on Matt Sydal. Sydal delivered a spike DDT and a shooting star press to Strong for the win.

Next, Joey Ryan was scheduled to defend the PWG World Championship against a mystery opponent of PWG Commissioner Dino Winwood's choosing. Winwood revealed Ryan's mystery challenger to be Necro Butcher and ordered it as a falls count anywhere match due to Ryan cheating in his previous matches to retain the title. Ryan pinned Necro with a roll-up by putting his feet on the ropes for leverage to retain the title.

Next, Chris Hero took on Scorpio Sky. Hero was distracted when he brought Sky's valet Jade Chung into the ring and began spanking her. It allowed Sky to roll-up Hero by grabbing his tights for leverage and pin him for the win. Frankie Kazarian attacked Sky after the match and tried to deliver a Wave To The Future but Sky avoided the move and retreated to the backstage.

Later, a Three Way Dance took place between Claudio Castagnoli, Scott Lost and TJ Perkins. Castagnoli knocked out Perkins with a Ricola Bomb but got a near-fall as Lost broke up the pinfall. Lost delivered a Lost Cause to Castagnoli and then applied Sharpshooters on both men for the win.

It was followed by the penultimate match between M-Dogg 20 and Jimmy Yang. M-Dogg 20 hit a backbreaker and a corkscrew moonsault but Taimak distracted the referee, allowing Yang to roll-up M-Dogg 20 and pin him by putting his feet on the ropes for leverage.

Next was the main event, in which Davey Richards and Super Dragon defended the PWG World Tag Team Championship against Cape Fear. Generico set up Dragon on the top rope but Dragon delivered a Psycho Driver to Generico from the second rope to retain the titles.

No.	Results	Stipulations	Times
1	Disco Machine and Excalibur defeated Bino Gambino and Top Gun Talwar	Tag team match	9:42
2	Ronin defeated Phoenix Star	Singles match	5:47
3	B-Boy defeated Chris Sabin, Frankie Kazarian and Kevin Steen	Four Way match in the final of a tournament to determine the #1 contender for the PWG World Championship	13:44
4	Matt Sydal defeated Roderick Strong	Singles match	19:30
5	Joey Ryan (c) defeated Necro Butcher	Falls Count Anywhere match for the PWG World Championship	11:52
6	Scorpio Sky (with Jade Chung) defeated Chris Hero	Singles match	24:00
7	Scott Lost defeated Claudio Castagnoli and TJ Perkins	Three Way Dance	10:47
8	Jimmy Yang (with Taimak) defeated M-Dogg 20	Singles match	9:05
9	Davey Richards and Super Dragon (c) defeated Cape Fear (El Generico and Quicksilver)	Tag team match for the PWG World Tag Team Championship	24:49
(c) / – the champion(s) heading into the match

Aftermath

Frankie Kazarian and Scorpio Sky got involved in a lengthy feud as the two competed in opposing teams in a tag team match at (Please Don't Call It) The O.C.. Kazarian teamed with B-Boy while Sky teamed with Joey Ryan. Kazarian and B-Boy won the match after Kazarian pinned Ryan. After the match, Kazarian and B-Boy were attacked by Ryan and Sky and Sky cut off Kazarian's ponytail. Due to pinning Ryan, Kazarian received a World Championship match at Fear of a Black Planet, which he lost due to Sky. Kazarian and Sky wrestled in various matches throughout the year, which culminated in a Loser Leaves PWG match at Based on a True Story. Kazarian won the match.

B-Boy received his World Championship opportunity against Joey Ryan in a Battledome match at Threemendous. Ryan retained the title.

=== All Star Weekend IV ===
All Star Weekend IV
- Promotion: Pro Wrestling Guerrilla
- Date: Night One: November 17, 2006; Night Two: November 17, 2006
- City: Reseda, California
- Venue: American Legion Post# 308
- Attendance: Night One: c. 400; Night Two: c. 350; Combined: c. 750

Event chronology
← Previous; Horror Business	Next → Passive Hostility

All Star Weekend chronology
← Previous; 3	Next → V

Night 1 (November 17)
No.	Results	Stipulations	Times
1	Colt Cabana defeated Petey Williams	Singles match	12:52
2	Ronin defeated M-Dogg 20	Singles match	5:23
3	The Motor City Machine Guns (Alex Shelley and Chris Sabin) (c) defeated Jimmy Jacobs and Tyler Black (with Lacey)	Tag team match for the International Lightweight Tag Team Championship	16:23
4	Homicide defeated Christopher Daniels	Singles match	14:25
5	AJ Styles defeated PAC	Singles match	13:13
6	Davey Richards and Roderick Strong defeated B-Boy and Super Dragon (c)	Tag team match for the PWG World Tag Team Championship	26:22
7	Samoa Joe defeated Rocky Romero	Singles match	15:14
8	The PWG-Unit (El Generico, Frankie Kazarian, Human Tornado and Quicksilver) defeated The Dynasty (Chris Bosh, Joey Ryan, Scorpio Sky and Scott Lost)	Eight-man tag team match	18:50
(c) / – the champion(s) heading into the match

Night 2 (November 18)
No.	Results	Stipulations	Times
1	Human Tornado defeated Petey Williams	Singles match	10:32
2	Christopher Daniels defeated Colt Cabana	Singles match	8:44
3	Arrogance (Chris Bosh and Scott Lost) defeated Frankie Kazarian and M-Dogg 20	Tag team match	12:14
4	Scorpio Sky defeated Homicide	Singles match	9:10
5	AJ Styles defeated Rocky Romero	Singles match	16:42
6	Ronin defeated Arik Cannon	Singles match	11:33
7	El Generico defeated PAC	Singles match	16:40
8	Joey Ryan (c) defeated Quicksilver	Singles match for the PWG World Championship	21:02
9	B-Boy and Super Dragon defeated Davey Richards and Roderick Strong (c), The Kings of Wrestling (Chris Hero and Claudio Castagnoli) and The Motor City Machine Guns (Alex Shelley and Chris Sabin)	Four Way match for the PWG World Tag Team Championship	31:22
(c) / – the champion(s) heading into the match

=== All Star Weekend V ===
All Star Weekend V
- Promotion: Pro Wrestling Guerrilla
- Date: Night One: April 7, 2007; Night Two: April 8, 2007
- City: Van Nuys, California
- Venue: Van Nuys Armory
- Attendance: Night One: c. 400; Night Two: c. 350; Combined: c. 750

Event chronology
← Previous; 70/30	Next → Dynamite Duumvirate Tag Team Title Tournament

All Star Weekend chronology
← Previous; IV	Next → 6

Night 1 (April 7)
No.	Results	Stipulations	Times
1	Disco Machine defeated Nosawa	Singles match	8:10
2	Rocky Romero defeated Roderick Strong	Singles match	17:29
3	Human Tornado (with Candice LeRae) defeated Claudio Castagnoli	Singles match	11:30
4	Kikutaro defeated Matt Classic	Singles match	10:37
5	Kevin Steen defeated Jack Evans	Singles match	12:48
6	Karl Anderson and The Dynasty (Chris Bosh, Joey Ryan and Scott Lost) defeated Frankie Kazarian, Ronin, TJ Perkins and Top Gun Talwar	Eight-man tag team match	20:57
7	Kaz Hayashi defeated Alex Shelley	Singles match	21:21
8	Low Ki defeated Davey Richards	Singles match	25:01
9	El Generico (c) defeated PAC	Singles match for the PWG World Championship	25:45
(c) / – the champion(s) heading into the match

Night 2 (April 8)
No.	Results	Stipulations	Times
1	Kevin Steen defeated Joey Ryan	No Holds Barred match	14:27
2	Rocky Romero, Ronin and TJ Perkins defeated Karl Anderson, Lil Cholo and Nosawa	Six-man tag team match	11:52
3	Davey Richards defeated Chris Hero	Singles match	17:21
4	Colt Cabana and Top Gun Talwar defeated Disco Machine and Kikutaro	Tag team match	13:48
5	Alex Shelley defeated Claudio Castagnoli	Singles match	15:12
6	Kaz Hayashi defeated PAC	Singles match	20:19
7	Arrogance (Chris Bosh and Scott Lost) vs. Jack Evans and Roderick Strong ended in a no contest	Tag team match	16:33
8	El Generico (c) defeated Human Tornado	Singles match for the PWG World Championship	13:04
9	Samoa Joe defeated Low Ki	Singles match	24:14
(c) / – the champion(s) heading into the match

=== All Star Weekend 6 ===
All Star Weekend 6
- Promotion: Pro Wrestling Guerrilla
- Date: Night One: January 5, 2008; Night Two: January 6, 2008
- City: Van Nuys, California
- Venue: Van Nuys Armory
- Attendance: Night One: c. 400; Night Two: c. 350; Combined: c. 750

Event chronology
← Previous; The High Cost of Doing Business	Next → Pearl Habra

All Star Weekend chronology
← Previous; V	Next → 7

Night 1 (January 5)
No.	Results	Stipulations	Times
1	Low Ki defeated Bryan Danielson (c)	Singles match for the PWG World Championship	25:45
2	El Generico defeated Karl Anderson	Singles match	9:43
3	Scorpio Sky defeated Ronin	Singles match	11:17
4	The Dynasty (Joey Ryan and Scott Lost) (with Jade Chung) defeated The Age of the Fall (Jimmy Jacobs and Tyler Black)	Tag team match	19:37
5	Jack Evans defeated Roderick Strong (1–0)	Singles match Match 1 in the Best Two out of Three Series to determine the #1 contender for the PWG World Championship	14:59
6	Muscle Outlaw'z (Masato Yoshino and Naruki Doi) defeated The Young Bucks (Matt Jackson and Nick Jackson)	Tag team match	17:38
7	Alex Koslov defeated TJ Perkins	Singles match	17:23
8	CIMA defeated Susumu Yokosuka	Singles match	10:38
9	Claudio Castagnoli, Eddie Kingston and Human Tornado defeated Candice LeRae, Chris Hero and Necro Butcher	Six-man tag team match	23:22
(c) / – the champion(s) heading into the match

Night 2 (January 6)
No.	Results	Stipulations	Times
1	Karl Anderson defeated Alex Koslov	Singles match	—
2	Chris Hero defeated Eddie Kingston	Singles match	—
3	The Age of the Fall (Jimmy Jacobs and Tyler Black) defeated The Young Bucks (Matt Jackson and Nick Jackson)	Tag team match	12:55
4	Roderick Strong defeated Jack Evans (1–1)	Singles match Match 2 in the Best Two out of Three Series to determine the #1 contender for the PWG World Championship	13:41
5	Human Tornado defeated Candice LeRae by disqualification	Singles match	—
6	Necro Butcher defeated Claudio Castagnoli	Singles match	—
7	El Generico defeated Susumu Yokosuka	Singles match	—
8	The Dynasty (Joey Ryan and Scott Lost) (with Jade Chung) defeated Muscle Outlaw'z (Masato Yoshino and Naruki Doi)	Tag team match	16:21
9	Super Dragon defeated TARO	Singles match	—
10	Bryan Danielson vs. CIMA ended in a draw	Singles match	20:05

=== All Star Weekend 7 ===
All Star Weekend 7
- Promotion: Pro Wrestling Guerrilla
- Date: Night One: August 30, 2008; Night Two: August 31, 2008
- City: Reseda, California
- Venue: American Legion Post #308

Event chronology
← Previous; Life During Wartime	Next → Battle of Los Angeles

All Star Weekend chronology
← Previous; 6	Next → 8

Night 1 (August 30)
No.	Results	Stipulations
1	Hook Bomberry and TJ Perkins defeated Ash Riot and Mark Davis	Tag team match
2	Jimmy Jacobs defeated Vin Gerard	Singles match
3	Rocky Romero defeated Alex Koslov	Singles match
4	The Dynasty (Joey Ryan and Scott Lost) defeated Los Luchas (Phoenix Star and Zokre)	Tag team match
5	Roderick Strong defeated Tyler Black	Singles match
6	Chuck Taylor defeated Candice LeRae	Singles match
7	PAC and The Young Bucks (Matt Jackson and Nick Jackson) defeated El Generico, Kevin Steen and Susumu Yokosuka	Six-man tag team match
8	Chris Hero (c) defeated Eddie Kingston, Low Ki and Necro Butcher	Fatal Four Way match for the PWG World Championship
(c) / – the champion(s) heading into the match

Night 2 (August 31)
No.	Results	Stipulations
1	Susumu Yokosuka defeated Alex Koslov	Singles match
2	El Generico defeated TJ Perkins	Singles match
3	The Dynasty (Joey Ryan and Scott Lost) defeated Chuck Taylor and Vin Gerard	Tag team match
4	Kevin Steen defeated Roderick Strong	Singles match
5	Low Ki defeated Rocky Romero	Singles match
6	Necro Butcher defeated Eddie Kingston	Singles match
7	The Young Bucks (Matt Jackson and Nick Jackson) defeated The Age of the Fall (Jimmy Jacobs and Tyler Black) (c)	Tag team match for the PWG World Tag Team Championship
8	Chris Hero (with Candice LeRae) (c) defeated PAC	Singles match for the PWG World Championship
(c) / – the champion(s) heading into the match

=== All Star Weekend 8 ===
All Star Weekend 8
- Promotion: Pro Wrestling Guerrilla
- Date: Night One: May 27, 2011; Night Two: May 28, 2011
- City: Reseda, California
- Venue: American Legion Post #308

Event chronology
← Previous; Card Subject To Change III	Next → Eight

All Star Weekend chronology
← Previous; 7	Next → 9

Night 1 (May 27)
No.	Results	Stipulations	Times
1	Willie Mack defeated Kevin Steen	Singles match	18:53
2	The Dynasty (Joey Ryan and Scott Lost) defeated The Fightin' Taylor Boys (Brian Cage-Taylor and Ryan Taylor) (with Chuck Taylor)	Tag team match	15:05
3	Chuck Taylor (with Ryan Taylor) defeated Kenny King	Singles match	10:20
4	The Young Bucks (Matt Jackson and Nick Jackson) (c) defeated The RockNES Monsters (Johnny Goodtime and Johnny Yuma)	Tag team match for the PWG World Tag Team Championship	20:32
5	Austin Aries and Roderick Strong defeated The Cutler Brothers (Brandon Cutler and Dustin Cutler)	Tag team match	24:14
6	Eddie Edwards defeated Alex Shelley	Singles match	17:28
7	The Nightmare Violence Connection (Akira Tozawa and Kevin Steen) defeated El Generico and Ricochet	Tag team match	24:28
8	Claudio Castagnoli (c) defeated Chris Hero	Singles match for the PWG World Championship	40:51
(c) / – the champion(s) heading into the match

Night 2 (May 28)
No.	Results	Stipulations	Times
1	Kenny King defeated Brian Cage-Taylor (with Chuck Taylor)	Singles match	12:44
2	The Nightmare Violence Connection (Akira Tozawa and Kevin Steen) defeated The RockNES Monsters (Johnny Goodtime and Johnny Yuma)	Tag team match	17:53
3	Ricochet defeated Willie Mack	Singles match	12:12
4	The Dynasty (Joey Ryan and Scott Lost) defeated The Cutler Brothers (Brandon Cutler and Dustin Cutler)	Tag team match	16:38
5	Eddie Edwards defeated El Generico	Singles match	20:49
6	The Young Bucks (Matt Jackson and Nick Jackson) (c) defeated Austin Aries and Roderick Strong	Tag team match for the PWG World Tag Team Championship	18:17
7	Akira Tozawa defeated Chris Hero	Singles match	17:36
8	Claudio Castagnoli (c) defeated Low Ki	Singles match for the PWG World Championship	20:10
(c) / – the champion(s) heading into the match

=== All Star Weekend 9 ===
All Star Weekend 9
- Promotion: Pro Wrestling Guerrilla
- Date: Night One: March 22, 2013; Night Two: March 23, 2013
- City: Reseda, California
- Venue: American Legion Post #308

Event chronology
← Previous; Dynamite Duumvirate Tag Team Title Tournament	Next → Is Your Body Ready?

All Star Weekend chronology
← Previous; 8	Next → 10

Night 1 (March 22)
No.	Results	Stipulations	Times
1	Paul London defeated Kevin Steen	Singles match	20:59
2	The Young Bucks (Matt Jackson and Nick Jackson) defeated Chuck Taylor and Johnny Gargano	Tag team match	16:27
3	Eddie Edwards defeated Jay Lethal	Singles match	21:15
4	The Inner City Machine Guns (Rich Swann and Ricochet) defeated AR Fox and Samuray del Sol	Tag team match	19:33
5	Roderick Strong defeated Trent?	Singles match	17:05
6	Unbreakable F'N Machines (Brian Cage and Michael Elgin) defeated Future Shock (Adam Cole and Kyle O'Reilly)	Tag team match	23:19
7	Drake Younger defeated Sami Callihan (2–1)	Guerrilla Warfare; Match Three of the Best of Three Series to determine the #1 contender for the PWG World Championship	21:43

Night 2 (March 23)
No.	Results	Stipulations	Times
1	Jay Lethal defeated Willie Mack	Singles match	10:25
2	Chuck Taylor and Johnny Gargano defeated RockNES Monsters (Johnny Goodtime and Johnny Yuma)	Tag team match	16:12
3	Paul London defeated Trent?	Singles match	18:25
4	Kevin Steen and Unbreakable F'N Machines (Brian Cage and Michael Elgin) defeated AR Fox and The Inner City Machine Guns (Rich Swann and Ricochet)	Six-man tag team match	27:16
5	TJ Perkins defeated Samuray del Sol	Singles match	15:22
6	Kyle O'Reilly defeated Sami Callihan	Singles match	24:59
7	The Young Bucks (Matt Jackson and Nick Jackson) (c) defeated The Dojo Bros (Eddie Edwards and Roderick Strong)	Tag team match for the PWG World Tag Team Championship	18:13
8	Adam Cole (c) defeated Drake Younger	Singles match for the PWG World Championship	18:33
(c) / – the champion(s) heading into the match

=== All Star Weekend 10 ===
All Star Weekend 10
- Promotion: Pro Wrestling Guerrilla
- Date: Night One: December 20, 2013; Night Two: December 21, 2013
- City: Reseda, California
- Venue: American Legion Post #308

Event chronology
← Previous; Matt Rushmore	Next → Dynamite Duumvirate Tag Team Title Tournament

All Star Weekend chronology
← Previous; 9	Next → 11

Night 1 (December 20)
No.	Results	Stipulations	Times
1	Brian Cage defeated Anthony Nese	Singles match	11:06
2	Candice LeRae and Joey Ryan defeated RockNES Monsters (Johnny Goodtime and Johnny Yuma)	Tag team match	9:38
3	Drake Younger defeated Tommaso Ciampa	Singles match	11:01
4	Johnny Gargano defeated Davey Richards	Singles match	18:25
5	Best Friends (Chuck Taylor and Trent) defeated The Dojo Bros (Eddie Edwards and Roderick Strong)	Tag team match	16:23
6	Michael Elgin defeated ACH	Singles match	17:07
7	Mount Rushmore (Kevin Steen and The Young Bucks (Matt Jackson and Nick Jackson)) defeated AR Fox and The Inner City Machine Guns (Rich Swann and Ricochet)	Six-man tag team match	20:29
8	Adam Cole (c) defeated Chris Hero	Singles match for the PWG World Championship	21:33
(c) / – the champion(s) heading into the match

Night 2 (December 21)
No.	Results	Stipulations	Times
1	RockNES Monsters (Johnny Goodtime and Johnny Yuma) defeated B-Boy and Willie Mack and PPRay (Peter Avalon and Ray Rosas)	Three Way match	11:31
2	Tommaso Ciampa defeated Anthony Nese	Singles match	11:08
3	Best Friends (Chuck Taylor and Trent?) defeated Unbreakable F'N Machines (Brian Cage and Michael Elgin)	Tag team match	18:29
4	Chris Hero defeated ACH	Singles match	19:34
5	The Dojo Bros (Eddie Edwards and Roderick Strong) defeated AR Fox and Rich Swann	Tag team match	19:21
6	Ricochet defeated Davey Richards	Singles match	21:33
7	Candice LeRae, Drake Younger and Joey Ryan defeated Mount Rushmore (Kevin Steen and The Young Bucks (Matt Jackson and Nick Jackson))	Six-person tag team match	15:56
8	Adam Cole (c) defeated Johnny Gargano	Singles match for the PWG World Championship	23:06
(c) / – the champion(s) heading into the match

=== All Star Weekend 11 ===
All Star Weekend 11
- Promotion: Pro Wrestling Guerrilla
- Date: Night One: December 11, 2015; Night Two: December 12, 2015
- City: Reseda, California
- Venue: American Legion Post #308

Event chronology
← Previous; Battle of Los Angeles	Next → Lëmmy

All Star Weekend chronology
← Previous; 10	Next → 12

Night 1 (December 11)
No.	Results	Stipulations	Times
1	Chuck Taylor defeated Mark Andrews	Singles match	9:22
2	Ricochet defeated Marty Scurll (16:37)	Singles match	—
3	The Unbreakable F'N Machines (Brian Cage and Michael Elgin) defeated The Wolves (Davey Richards and Eddie Edwards)	Tag team match	22:00
4	Sami Callihan defeated Drew Gulak	Singles match	9:47
5	Trevor Lee defeated Will Ospreay	Singles match	11:08
6	Kenny Omega defeated Mike Bailey	Singles match	20:51
7	The Young Bucks (Matt Jackson and Nick Jackson) (c) defeated Johnny Gargano and Tommaso Ciampa	Tag team match for the PWG World Tag Team Championship	15:34
8	Roderick Strong (c) defeated Matt Sydal	Singles match for the PWG World Championship	19:55
(c) / – the champion(s) heading into the match

Night 2 (December 12)
No.	Results	Stipulations	Times
1	Chuck Taylor defeated Kikutaro	Singles match	0:04
2	Chuck Taylor defeated Kikutaro	Singles match	9:22
3	Timothy Thatcher defeated Marty Scurll	Singles match	17:06
4	The Unbreakable F'N Machines (Brian Cage and Michael Elgin) defeated Johnny Gargano and Tommaso Ciampa	Tag team match	16:33
5	Ricochet defeated Mark Andrews	Singles match	10:50
6	Trevor Lee defeated Matt Sydal	Singles match	13:20
7	Kenny Omega defeated Will Ospreay	Singles match	16:20
8	Chris Hero, Mike Bailey and The World's Cutest Tag Team (Candice LeRae and Joey Ryan) defeated Mount Rushmore 2.0 (Adam Cole, Roderick Strong and The Young Bucks (Matt Jackson and Nick Jackson))	Guerrilla Warfare	26:40

=== All Star Weekend 12 ===
All Star Weekend 12
- Promotion: Pro Wrestling Guerrilla
- Date: Night One: March 4, 2016; Night Two: March 5, 2016
- City: Reseda, California
- Venue: American Legion Post #308

Event chronology
← Previous; Bowie	Next → Prince

All Star Weekend chronology
← Previous; 11	Next → 13

Night 1 (March 4)
No.	Results	Stipulations	Times
1	Chuck Taylor defeated Trevor Lee	Singles match	9:03
2	Chris Hero defeated Evil Uno	Singles match	16:18
3	Trent? defeated Drew Galloway	Singles match	15:44
4	Roderick Strong defeated Mark Andrews	Singles match	16:39
5	Kyle O'Reilly defeated Marty Scurll	Singles match	18:51
6	Zack Sabre Jr. defeated Adam Cole	Singles match	18:38
7	The Young Bucks (Matt Jackson and Nick Jackson) (c) defeated Matt Sydal and Ricochet	Tag team match for the PWG World Tag Team Championship	18:36
(c) / – the champion(s) heading into the match

Night 2 (March 5)
No.	Results	Stipulations	Times
1	Chuck Taylor defeated Marty Scurll	Singles match	12:32
2	Mark Andrews defeated Evil Uno	Singles match	15:22
3	Trevor Lee defeated Drew Galloway	Singles match	15:24
4	Matt Sydal and Ricochet defeated Death By Elbow (Chris Hero and JT Dunn)	Tag team match	27:25
5	Trent defeated Adam Cole	Singles match	13:22
6	The Young Bucks (Matt Jackson and Nick Jackson) (c) defeated reDRagon (Bobby Fish and Kyle O'Reilly)	Tag team match for the PWG World Tag Team Championship	22:48
7	Zack Sabre Jr. defeated Roderick Strong (c)	Singles match for the PWG World Championship	33:36
(c) / – the champion(s) heading into the match

=== All Star Weekend 13 ===
All Star Weekend 13
- Promotion: Pro Wrestling Guerrilla
- Date: Night One: October 20, 2017; Night Two: October 21, 2017
- City: Reseda, California
- Venue: American Legion Post #308

Event chronology
← Previous; Battle of Los Angeles	Next → Mystery Vortex V

All Star Weekend chronology
← Previous; 12	Next → 14

Night 1 (October 20)
No.	Results	Stipulations	Times
1	Morgan Webster defeated Brian Cage	Singles match	10:40
2	Mark Haskins defeated Adam Brooks	Singles match	18:17
3	Joey Janela defeated Trevor Lee	Singles match	15:06
4	Keith Lee defeated Jonah Rock	Singles match	18:31
5	Sammy Guevara defeated Flamita and Rey Horus	Three Way match	13:50
6	Ricochet defeated WALTER	Singles match	16:15
7	The Chosen Bros (Jeff Cobb and Matthew Riddle) defeated The Lucha Brothers (Penta el 0M and Rey Fenix) (c)	Tag team match for the PWG World Tag Team Championship	17:39
(c) / – the champion(s) heading into the match

Night 2 (October 21)
No.	Results	Stipulations	Times
1	Jonah Rock defeated Adam Brooks	Singles match	10:43
2	The Young Bucks (Matt Jackson and Nick Jackson) defeated Mark Haskins and Morgan Webster	Tag team match	17:44
3	Marty Scurll defeated Joey Janela	Singles match	14:12
4	WALTER defeated Zack Sabre Jr.	Singles match	20:04
5	Trent defeated Matt Sydal and Rey Horus	Three Way match	16:59
6	Ricochet defeated Chuck Taylor (c)	Singles match for the PWG World Championship	31:00
(c) / – the champion(s) heading into the match

=== All Star Weekend 14 ===
All Star Weekend 14
- Promotion: Pro Wrestling Guerrilla
- Date: Night One: April 20, 2018; Night Two: April 21, 2018
- City: Reseda, California
- Venue: American Legion Post #308

Event chronology
← Previous; Time is a Flat Circle	Next → Bask in his Glory

All Star Weekend chronology
← Previous; 13	Next → Final

Night 1 (April 20)
No.	Results	Stipulations	Times
1	Rey Horus defeated Trevor Lee	Singles match	11:39
2	Taiji Ishimori defeated Bandido	Singles match	13:41
3	Ringkampf (Timothy Thatcher and WALTER) defeated Violence Unlimited (Brody King and Tyler Bateman)	Tag team match	19:29
4	Sammy Guevara defeated Morgan Webster and Robbie Eagles	Three Way match	13:11
5	Jonah Rock defeated Joey Janela	Singles match	11:18
6	Keith Lee defeated Hangman Page	Singles match	21:25
7	The Rascalz (Dezmond Xavier and Zachary Wentz) defeated The Chosen Bros (Jeff Cobb and Matt Riddle) (c) and The Young Bucks (Matt Jackson and Nick Jackson)	Three Way match for the PWG World Tag Team Championship	18:26
(c) / – the champion(s) heading into the match

Night 2 (April 21)
No.	Results	Stipulations	Times
1	Trevor Lee defeated Morgan Webster	Singles match	10:51
2	Joey Janela defeated Robbie Eagles	Singles match	14:36
3	Sammy Guevara defeated Taiji Ishimori	Singles match	9:02
4	The Rascalz (Dezmond Xavier and Zachary Wentz) (c) defeated Violence Unlimited (Brody King and Tyler Bateman)	Tag team match for the PWG World Tag Team Championship	13:19
5	Bandido defeated Rey Horus	Singles match	12:01
6	Matt Riddle defeated Timothy Thatcher	Singles match	11:33
7	WALTER defeated Keith Lee (c) and Jonah Rock	Three Way match for the PWG World Championship	13:24
(c) / – the champion(s) heading into the match
