= PWG Mystery Vortex =

Annual supercard event by PWG

Mystery Vortex
- Promotions: Pro Wrestling Guerrilla
- First event: Mystery Vortex I
- Event gimmick: Event with the element of mystery and surprises as matches are not announced beforehand

Mystery Vortex was an annual professional wrestling event produced by Pro Wrestling Guerrilla (PWG). The event was titled as such because most of the matches are not announced beforehand to captivate the audiences with surprise matches. The event was notable for unannounced returns of major PWG wrestlers, surprise debuts of major stars and matches often being announced during the event.

== Dates, venues and main events ==
#	Event	Date	City	Venue	Main event
1	Mystery Vortex	December 1, 2012	Reseda, California	American Legion Post #308	Kevin Steen (c) vs. Adam Cole in a Guerrilla Warfare for the PWG World Championship
2	Mystery Vortex II	March 28, 2014	Reseda, California	American Legion Post #308	Adam Cole (c) vs. Candice LeRae for the PWG World Championship
3	Mystery Vortex III: Rock And Shock The Nation	June 26, 2015	Reseda, California	American Legion Post #308	Andrew Everett and Trevor Lee (c) vs. The Young Bucks (Matt Jackson and Nick Jackson) for the PWG World Tag Team Championship
4	Mystery Vortex IV	December 16, 2016	Reseda, California	American Legion Post #308	Zack Sabre Jr. (c) vs. Marty Scurll for the PWG World Championship
5	Mystery Vortex V	December 1, 2018	Reseda, California	American Legion Post #308	Ricochet (c) vs. Chuck Taylor in a Guerrilla Warfare for the PWG World Championship
6	Mystery Vortex VI	October 5, 2019	Los Angeles, California	Globe Theatre	Darby Allin vs. Joey Janela in a Guerrilla Warfare
7	Mystery Vortex 7	August 1, 2021	Los Angeles, California	Globe Theatre	Bandido (c) vs. Black Taurus for the PWG World Championship
8	Twenty: Mystery Vortex	August 13, 2023	Los Angeles, California	Globe Theatre	Daniel Garcia (c) vs. Mike Bailey in an Iron Man match for the PWG World Championship

== Results ==
=== Mystery Vortex I ===
Mystery Vortex I
- Promotion: Pro Wrestling Guerrilla
- Date: December 1, 2012
- City: Reseda, California
- Venue: American Legion Post #308

Event chronology
← Previous; Failure To Communicate	Next → Dynamite Duumvirate Tag Team Title Tournament

Mystery Vortex chronology
← Previous; First	Next → II

One of the PWG's six co-founders and the promotion's veteran Joey Ryan wrestled his farewell match in the promotion against Scorpio Sky due to signing a contract with Total Nonstop Action Wrestling. Ryan lost the match.

No.	Results	Stipulations	Times
1	Eddie Edwards and Roderick Strong defeated The Young Bucks (Matt Jackson and Nick Jackson)	Tag team match	14:55
2	Sami Callihan defeated Drake Younger	Singles match Match one in a Best of Three Series to determine the #1 contender for the PWG World Championship	16:51
3	The Super Smash Brothers (Player Uno and Stupefied) (c) defeated The RockNES Monsters (Johnny Goodtime and Johnny Yuma)	Tag team match for the PWG World Tag Team Championship	14:27
4	Scorpio Sky defeated Joey Ryan	Singles match	11:51
5	Willie Mack defeated B-Boy, Brian Cage and T.J. Perkins	Four-Way match	13:11
6	El Generico defeated Rich Swann	Singles match	14:56
7	Eddie Edwards and Roderick Strong defeated The Super Smash Brothers (Player Uno and Stupefied)	Tag team match	12:13
8	Adam Cole defeated Kevin Steen (c)	Guerrilla Warfare for the PWG World Championship	20:55
(c) / – the champion(s) heading into the match

=== Mystery Vortex II ===
Mystery Vortex II
- Promotion: Pro Wrestling Guerrilla
- Date: March 28, 2014
- City: Reseda, California
- Venue: American Legion Post #308

Event chronology
← Previous; Dynamite Duumvirate Tag Team Title Tournament	Next → CZW/PWG WrestleCon

Mystery Vortex chronology
← Previous; I	Next → III

No.	Results	Stipulations	Times
1	Andrew Everett defeated Cedric Alexander and Trevor Lee	Three-Way match	12:08
2	B-Boy, Joey Ryan and Willie Mack defeated The RockNES Monsters (Johnny Goodtime and Johnny Yuma) and Peter Avalon	Six-man tag team match	11:29
3	Roderick Strong defeated Anthony Nese	Singles match	16:53
4	The Unbreakable F'N Machines (Brian Cage and Michael Elgin) defeated The Inner City Machine Guns (Rich Swann and Ricochet) and The African American Wolves (ACH and AR Fox)	Three-Way tag team match	29:05
5	Chris Hero defeated Tommaso Ciampa	Singles match	19:36
6	Kyle O'Reilly defeated Johnny Gargano	Singles match	27:50
7	The Young Bucks (Matt Jackson and Nick Jackson) (c) defeated Best Friends (Chuck Taylor and Trent)	Tag team match for the PWG World Tag Team Championship	17:54
8	Adam Cole (c) defeated Candice LeRae	Singles match for the PWG World Championship	14:26
(c) / – the champion(s) heading into the match

=== Mystery Vortex III ===
Mystery Vortex III: Rock And Shock The Nation
- Promotion: Pro Wrestling Guerrilla
- Date: June 26, 2015
- City: Reseda, California
- Venue: American Legion Post #308

Event chronology
← Previous; Dynamite Duumvirate Tag Team Title Tournament	Next → Threemendous IV

Mystery Vortex chronology
← Previous; II	Next → IV

Josh Alexander competed in his farewell match at the event as he retired from wrestling due to neck injury. Monster Mafia lost to World's Cutest Tag Team in Alexander's farewell match. The event featured the surprise return of The Young Bucks after a four-month absence, who interrupted Andrew Everett and Trevor Lee to an impromptu match and defeated them to win the PWG World Tag Team Championship, thanks to interference by the PWG World Champion Roderick Strong. After the match, Super Dragon made his surprise return to PWG after a three-year absence and attacked Rick Knox, Excalibur, Candice LeRae, Andrew Everett, Trevor Lee, Biff Busick and Mike Bailey in quick succession. Strong subsequently formed the Mount Rushmore 2.0 faction with Dragon and the Bucks.

No.	Results	Stipulations	Times
1	Tommaso Ciampa defeated Johnny Gargano	Singles match	18:36
2	The World's Cutest Tag Team (Candice LeRae and Joey Ryan) defeated The Monster Mafia (Ethan Page and Josh Alexander)	Tag team match	12:17
3	Biff Busick defeated Timothy Thatcher	Singles match	11:36
4	Roderick Strong (c) defeated Mike Bailey	Singles match for the PWG World Championship	18:50
5	Brian Cage defeated John Silver	Singles match	13:57
6	Zack Sabre Jr. defeated Chris Hero by total knockout	Singles match	24:00
7	The Young Bucks (Matt Jackson and Nick Jackson) defeated Andrew Everett and Trevor Lee (c)	Tag team match for the PWG World Tag Team Championship	14:13
(c) / – the champion(s) heading into the match

=== Mystery Vortex IV ===
Mystery Vortex IV
- Promotion: Pro Wrestling Guerrilla
- Date: December 16, 2016
- City: Reseda, California
- Venue: American Legion Post #308

Event chronology
← Previous; Battle of Los Angeles	Next → Only Kings Understand Each Other

Mystery Vortex chronology
← Previous; III	Next → V

Chris Hero wrestled his farewell match in PWG at the event, in which Death By Elbow lost to reDRagon. Hero cut a promo after the match, in which he explained his departure due to re-signing with WWE.

No.	Results	Stipulations	Times
1	Trent? defeated Candice LeRae	Singles match	12:36
2	Trevor Lee defeated ACH	Singles match	14:54
3	Matt Sydal defeated Pete Dunne	Singles match	17:23
4	reDRagon (Bobby Fish and Kyle O'Reilly) defeated Death By Elbow (Chris Hero and JT Dunn)	Tag team match	27:07
5	Chuck Taylor defeated Adam Cole	Singles match to determine the #1 contender for the PWG World Championship	9:59
6	Jeff Cobb and Matthew Riddle defeated The Young Bucks (Matt Jackson and Nick Jackson)	Tag team match	18:47
7	Zack Sabre Jr. (c) defeated Marty Scurll	Singles match for the PWG World Championship	37:23
(c) / – the champion(s) heading into the match

=== Mystery Vortex V ===
Mystery Vortex V
- Promotion: Pro Wrestling Guerrilla
- Date: January 12, 2018
- City: Reseda, California
- Venue: American Legion Post #308

Event chronology
← Previous; All Star Weekend 13	Next → Neon Knights

Mystery Vortex chronology
← Previous; IV	Next → VI

Ricochet's PWG World Championship title defense against Chuck Taylor in a Guerrilla Warfare was his farewell match. He cut a promo after losing the title.

No.	Results	Stipulations	Times
1	David Starr defeated Fred Yehi	Singles match	18:42
2	Joey Janela defeated Morgan Webster	Singles match	13:54
3	Sammy Guevara defeated Rey Fenix	Singles match	13:50
4	Keith Lee defeated Zack Sabre Jr.	Singles match	19:09
5	Trent? defeated Marty Scurll	Singles match	20:10
6	The Chosen Bros (Jeff Cobb and Matthew Riddle) (c) defeated Ringkampf (Timothy Thatcher and WALTER)	Tag team match for the PWG World Tag Team Championship	18:29
7	Chuck Taylor defeated Ricochet (c)	Guerrilla Warfare for the PWG World Championship	23:56
(c) / – the champion(s) heading into the match

=== Mystery Vortex VI ===
Mystery Vortex VI
- Promotion: Pro Wrestling Guerrilla
- Date: October 5, 2019
- City: Los Angeles, California
- Venue: Globe Theatre

Event chronology
← Previous; Two Hundred	Next → Sixteen

Mystery Vortex chronology
← Previous; V	Next → 7

No.	Results	Stipulations	Times
1	Trey Miguel defeated Tony Deppen	Singles match	9:08
2	Chuck Taylor defeated Orange Cassidy	Singles match	13:47
3	Jeff Cobb (c) defeated Jonathan Gresham	Singles match for the PWG World Championship	14:22
4	Brody King defeated Jake Atlas and Trent?	Three-Way match	13:35
5	Jungle Boy defeated Puma King	Singles match	8:39
6	The Rascalz (Dezmond Xavier and Zachary Wentz) (c) defeated Flamita and Rey Horus	Tag team match for the PWG World Championship	10:03
7	Darby Allin defeated Joey Janela	Guerrilla Warfare	21:59
(c) / – the champion(s) heading into the match

=== Mystery Vortex 7 ===
Mystery Vortex 7
- Promotion: Pro Wrestling Guerrilla
- Date: August 1, 2021
- City: Los Angeles, California
- Venue: Globe Theatre

Event chronology
← Previous; The Makings of a Varsity Athlete	Next → Threemendous VI

Mystery Vortex chronology
← Previous; VI	Next → Twenty: Mystery Vortex

It was PWG's first event after hiatus during the COVID-19 pandemic, the last event being The Makings of a Varsity Athlete, which took place on December 20, 2019. Super Dragon made his surprise return to the promotion by joining Black Taurus and Demonic Flamita in assaulting Bandido after Bandido retained the PWG World Championship against Taurus. This prompted AEW star Malakai Black, who formerly competed in PWG as Tommy End, to make his surprise return to the promotion after a five-year absence, having last competed at the 2016 Battle of Los Angeles. Black rescued Bandido from the assault and was joined by Brody King and the two formed a tag team with Black promising to appear at Threemendous VI.

No.	Results	Stipulations	Times
1	Tony Deppen defeated Jack Cartwheel	Singles match	11:30
2	Brody King defeated JD Drake	Singles match	12:22
3	Demonic Flamita defeated Arez	Singles match	15:40
4	Jonathan Gresham defeated Lee Moriarty	Singles match	23:34
5	Aramis and Rey Horus defeated Myron Reed and Trey Miguel	Tag team match	11:15
6	Orange Cassidy defeated Evil Uno	Singles match	11:03
7	Bandido (c) defeated Black Taurus	Singles match for the PWG World Championship	16:25
(c) / – the champion(s) heading into the match
