= Battle of Los Angeles (2014) =

2014 professional wrestling tournament by PWG

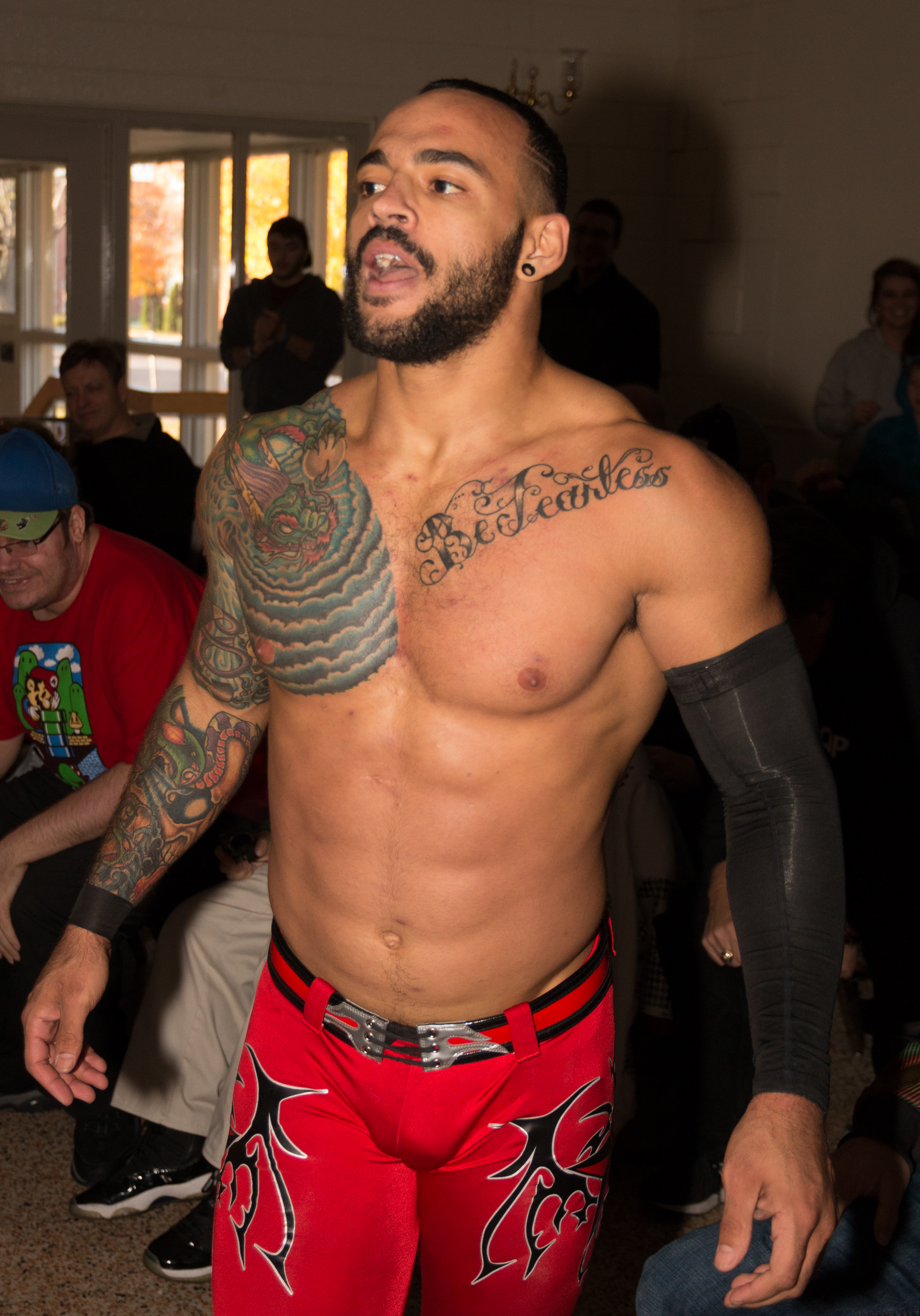
- The 2014 tournament winner Ricochet
- Promotion: Pro Wrestling Guerrilla
- Date: Night One: August 29, 2014; Night Two: August 30, 2014; Night Three: August 31, 2014
- City: Reseda, Los Angeles, California
- Venue: American Legion Post #308

Event chronology
← Previous; Eleven	Next → Untitled II

Battle of Los Angeles chronology
← Previous; 2013	Next → 2015

Battle of Los Angeles (2014) was the tenth Battle of Los Angeles professional wrestling tournament produced by Pro Wrestling Guerrilla (PWG). It was a three-night event which took place on August 29, August 30 and August 31, 2014 at the American Legion Post #308 in Reseda, Los Angeles, California.

It was a twenty-four man tournament which concluded with a three-way match in the final, in which Ricochet defeated Johnny Gargano and Roderick Strong. Various non-tournament matches took place at the event.

On the first night, The World's Cutest Tag Team (Candice LeRae and Joey Ryan) retained the World Tag Team Championship against The Inner City Machine Guns (Rich Swann and Ricochet) and Christopher Daniels and Frankie Kazarian in a three-way match while Men of Low Moral Fiber (Kenny Omega and Chuck Taylor) and Zack Sabre Jr. defeated Mount Rushmore (Adam Cole and The Young Bucks (Matt Jackson and Nick Jackson)).

On the second night, reDRagon (Bobby Fish and Kyle O'Reilly) defeated Biff Busick and Drew Gulak and The Young Bucks defeated Christopher Daniels and Frankie Kazarian.

On the third night, the Mount Rushmore defeated ACH, Brian Myers and Chris Sabin and a six-man tag team match took place in which Chris Hero, Chuck Taylor, Joey Ryan, Rich Swann and Willie Mack defeated Biff Busick, Brian Myers, Cedric Alexander, Drew Gulak and Tommaso Ciampa in a ten-man tag team match.

== Background ==
PWG announced the 2014 edition of the Battle of Los Angeles as a twenty-four man tournament, making it the first time since the 2007 edition that twenty-four competitors were added into the tournament. A. R. Fox and Trent? were originally announced for the tournament, but on August 6, PWG announced that they would have to pull out due to injuries. They were replaced by Bobby Fish and Candice LeRae, respectively. This made LeRae, the first female participant in the Battle of Los Angeles. On the first day of the tournament, it was announced T. J. Perkins would be replacing an injured Brian Cage.

== Event ==
=== Night One ===
The 2014 Battle of Los Angeles tournament kicked off with a match between Bobby Fish and T.J. Perkins. Perkins countered a Flying Fish Hook by Fish into a bridge and pinned him for the win.

Next, Roderick Strong took on Biff Busick. Strong delivered an End of Heartache to Busick for the win.

Next, Trevor Lee took on Cedric Alexander. Lee caught a running Alexander and delivered an Orange Crush to Alexander for the win.

Next, The World's Cutest Tag Team (Candice LeRae and Joey Ryan) defended the World Tag Team Championship against The Inner City Machine Guns (Rich Swann and Ricochet) and Bad Influence (Christopher Daniels and Frankie Kazarian) in a three-way match. LeRae delivered a reverse hurricanrana to Swann to win the match and retain the titles.

The first round of the Battle of Los Angeles continued as Michael Elgin took on Tommaso Ciampa. Elgin hit a back fist and a lariat to Ciampa for the win.

Next, AJ Styles took on Brian Myers. Styles made Myers submit to the Boston crab and delivered some Styles Clashes to Myers.

Next, the World Champion Kyle O'Reilly took on Drew Gulak. O'Reilly hit a brainbuster and followed it by applying an Arm-Ageddon to Gulak for the win.

It was followed by the main event, a six-man tag team match in which Men of Low Moral Fiber (Chuck Taylor and Kenny Omega) and Zack Sabre Jr. took on Mount Rushmore (Adam Cole and The Young Bucks (Matt Jackson and Nick Jackson)). Omega initially had the match won when he delivered a Croyt's Wrath to Cole and covered him for the pinfall but Nick Jackson pulled the referee Rick Knox out to prevent him from counting the pinfall. Sabre attempted a suicide dive on Nick but Nick pulled Knox in front and Knox was accidentally hit with the suicide dive, getting knocked out in the process. Bucks delivered an Early-Onset Alzheimer's to Omega and Cole followed it by delivering a Panama Sunrise to Omega. Cole covered Omega for the pinfall. Patrick Hernandez stepped in Knox's place and tried to count the pinfall but Trent Beretta returned from the injury and pulled Hernandez out of the ring. Nick accidentally hit a superkick to Hernandez. Trent hit Cole and the Bucks with chairs. Sabre hit a football kick to Cole and Omega followed it with a Croyt's Wrath and Taylor delivered an Awful Waffle to Cole and pinned him. Trent counted the pinfall for the win.

=== Night Two ===
The first round of the Battle of Los Angeles continued on the second night as Candice LeRae took on Rich Swann, thus making LeRae, the first female participant in the Battle of Los Angeles. LeRae tried to deliver a Moustache Ride to Swann but Swann countered and dropped her onto the mat. He followed it by attempting a Five Star Swann Splash but LeRae blocked it with her knees and pinned Swann with a small package for the win.

Next, Chuck Taylor took on Johnny Gargano. Gargano made Taylor submit to the Garga-No-Escape for the win.

Next, Chris Sabin took on Ricochet. Ricochet delivered a 630° senton to Sabin for the win.

Next, reDRagon (Kyle O'Reilly and Bobby Fish) took on Biff Busick and Drew Gulak. reDRagon delivered a Chasing The Dragon (a roundhouse kick by Fish and a brainbuster by O'Reilly combination) to Gulak for the win.

The Battle of Los Angeles tournament continued as Chris Hero took on Matt Sydal. Sydal delivered a DDT to Hero and followed it by delivering a Shooting Sydal Press for the win.

Next, Adam Cole took on Zack Sabre Jr. Sabre pinned Cole with a bridge for the win.

Next, Kenny Omega took on ACH. Omega delivered a Croyt's Wrath to ACH for the win.

It was followed by the main event, in which Bad Influence took on The Young Bucks. Bucks delivered a Meltzer Driver (springboard somersault senton and a kneeling reverse piledriver combination) to Kazarian for the win.

=== Night Three ===
Quarterfinals

The quarterfinal round of the Battle of Los Angeles began with a match between Candice LeRae and Johnny Gargano. Gargano delivered a Hurts Donut to LeRae for the win.

Next, T.J. Perkins took on Ricochet. Ricochet delivered a Benadryller to Perkins for the win.

Next, Michael Elgin took on Trevor Lee. Lee countered an Elgin Bomb attempt by Elgin into a reverse hurricanrana and pinned Elgin with a small package for the win.

Next, Kenny Omega took on Matt Sydal. Omega avoided a Shooting Sydal Press by Sydal and delivered a double underhook powerbomb to Sydal for the win.

Next, AJ Styles took on Roderick Strong. The referee Justin Borden got knocked out during the match, allowing Strong to get steel chairs and hit Styles with them. Styles got the chairs and hit Strong with the chairs and the referee recovered to see Styles hitting Strong with the chair, thus disqualifying him.

Next, Kyle O'Reilly took on Zack Sabre Jr. O'Reilly made Sabre submit to the triangle choke for the win. Roderick Strong attacked O'Reilly and Sabre after the match. He attacked Rick Knox and Excalibur with chairs after the two tried to prevent him from using the chairs. He injured O'Reilly by delivering an End of Heartache to O'Reilly onto the chairs and applied a Stronghold on O'Reilly. Bobby Fish made the save forcing Strong to retreat. The assault by Strong forced O'Reilly to miss the semifinal match against Strong and Strong directly advanced to the final round.

Next, ACH, Brian Myers and Chris Sabin took on Mount Rushmore. Adam Cole delivered a Panama Sunrise to ACH and Young Bucks followed by hitting a More Bang For Your Buck (a rolling fireman's carry slam followed by a moonsault and a 450° splash combination) to ACH for the win.

Semifinals

The semifinal round began with a match between Johnny Gargano and Trevor Lee. Gargano made Lee submit to the Garga-No-Escape for the win.

Next, Kenny Omega took on Ricochet. Ricochet delivered a Benadryller to Omega for the win.

It was followed by a ten-man tag team match, in which Chris Hero, Willie Mack, Joey Ryan, Rich Swann and Chuck Taylor took on Biff Busick, Drew Gulak, Cedric Alexander, Bobby Fish and Tommaso Ciampa. It was Mack's farewell match in PWG. Trent Beretta interfered in the match by attacking Ciampa and putting a grenade in Fish's underpants which exploded. Swann took advantage and delivered a Five Star Swann Splash to Fish for the win.

Final

The final was a three-way match, in which Roderick Strong took on Johnny Gargano and Ricochet. Ricochet delivered a Benadryller to Gargano to win the 2014 Battle of Los Angeles tournament. Strong attacked Ricochet after the match by hitting him with an End of Heartache and broke the Battle of Los Angeles trophy.

== Reception ==
Jake St. Pierre gave overwhelmingly positive reviews to the 2014 Battle of Los Angeles, directing praise towards night two and night three while criticizing night one. He rated it 5.5, considering it "a pretty skippable show from a promotion who's made it a mission to not put skippable shows on." He said that the show was "filled with a lot of house show-esque efforts and a general lack of excitement". He criticized the match between AJ Styles and Brian Myers, stating it "useless" but appreciated the six-man tag team match in the main event, calling it "tremendous and" "pretty much worth the price of admission along with the Tag Title match".

He rated the night two 8.0 calling it "a show worthy of" PWG's catalogue. According to him, "There weren't any MOTYC's here, but everyone worked hard and provided PWG with a terrific variety of wrestling that no other promotions can give." He praised the match between ACH and Kenny Omega, considering it a "must-see for this show".

He rated the night three 8.5. He praised the overall event as "an immensely entertaining tournament with a barrage of premium indy wrestling, comedy, and storytelling". He criticized the length of night three as a very long event where "the fans had to sit through 170 minutes of in-ring wrestling in a burning-up building". There were "fantastic matches all down the card" but specific criticism was directed at the match between AJ Styles and Roderick Strong.

== Aftermath ==
Roderick Strong's assault on Kyle O'Reilly led to a match between the two for the PWG World Championship at Untitled II, where O'Reilly retained. However, Strong attacked O'Reilly and the referee Rick Knox after the match. The 2014 Battle of Los Angeles winner Ricochet received his title shot for the World Championship against Kyle O'Reilly at Black Cole Sun, but failed to win. Strong suddenly showed up after the match and attacked O'Reilly and forced him to give him an immediate World Championship title shot. O'Reilly accepted it as a Guerrilla Warfare match, which Strong won.

== Results ==
Night 1 (August 29)
No.	Results	Stipulations	Times
1	T.J. Perkins defeated Bobby Fish	Singles match in the first round of Battle of Los Angeles tournament	13:47
2	Roderick Strong defeated Biff Busick	Singles match in the first round of Battle of Los Angeles tournament	12:26
3	Trevor Lee defeated Cedric Alexander	Singles match in the first round of Battle of Los Angeles tournament	13:33
4	The World's Cutest Tag Team (Candice LeRae and Joey Ryan) (c) defeated The Inner City Machine Guns (Rich Swann and Ricochet) and Christopher Daniels and Frankie Kazarian	Three Way match for the PWG World Tag Team Championship	14:53
5	Michael Elgin defeated Tommaso Ciampa	Singles match in the first round of Battle of Los Angeles tournament	15:15
6	AJ Styles defeated Brian Myers	Singles match in the first round of Battle of Los Angeles tournament	14:10
7	Kyle O'Reilly defeated Drew Gulak	Singles match in the first round of Battle of Los Angeles tournament	17:28
8	Men of Low Moral Fiber (Chuck Taylor and Kenny Omega) and Zack Sabre Jr. defeated Mount Rushmore (Adam Cole and The Young Bucks (Matt Jackson and Nick Jackson))	Six-man tag team match	21:46
(c) / – the champion(s) heading into the match

Night 2 (August 30)
No.	Results	Stipulations	Times
1	Candice LeRae defeated Rich Swann	Singles match in the first round of Battle of Los Angeles tournament	12:07
2	Johnny Gargano defeated Chuck Taylor	Singles match in the first round of Battle of Los Angeles tournament	14:00
3	Ricochet defeated Chris Sabin	Singles match in the first round of Battle of Los Angeles tournament	14:54
4	reDRagon (Bobby Fish and Kyle O'Reilly) defeated Biff Busick and Drew Gulak	Tag team match	19:35
5	Matt Sydal defeated Chris Hero	Singles match in the first round of Battle of Los Angeles tournament	18:25
6	Zack Sabre Jr. defeated Adam Cole	Singles match in the first round of Battle of Los Angeles tournament	18:03
7	Kenny Omega defeated ACH	Singles match in the first round of Battle of Los Angeles tournament	24:34
8	The Young Bucks (Matt Jackson and Nick Jackson) defeated Christopher Daniels and Frankie Kazarian	Six-man tag team match	19:23

Night 3 (August 31)
No.	Results	Stipulations	Times
1	Johnny Gargano defeated Candice LeRae	Singles match in the quarter-final round of Battle of Los Angeles tournament	10:41
2	Ricochet defeated TJ Perkins	Singles match in the quarter-final round of Battle of Los Angeles tournament	10:23
3	Trevor Lee defeated Michael Elgin	Singles match in the quarter-final round of Battle of Los Angeles tournament	12:39
4	Kenny Omega defeated Matt Sydal	Singles match in the quarter-final round of Battle of Los Angeles tournament	13:49
5	Roderick Strong defeated AJ Styles by disqualification	Singles match in the quarter-final round of Battle of Los Angeles tournament	16:35
6	Kyle O'Reilly defeated Zack Sabre Jr.	Singles match in the quarter-final round of Battle of Los Angeles tournament	17:00
7	Mount Rushmore (Adam Cole and The Young Bucks (Matt Jackson and Nick Jackson)) defeated ACH, Brian Myers and Chris Sabin	Six-man tag team match	10:44
8	Johnny Gargano defeated Trevor Lee	Singles match in the semi-final round of Battle of Los Angeles tournament	15:48
9	Ricochet defeated Kenny Omega	Singles match in the semi-final round of Battle of Los Angeles tournament	18:53
10	Chris Hero, Chuck Taylor, Joey Ryan, Rich Swann and Willie Mack defeated Biff Busick, Bobby Fish, Cedric Alexander, Drew Gulak and Tommaso Ciampa	Ten-man tag team match	20:43
11	Ricochet defeated Johnny Gargano and Roderick Strong	Three Way match in the Battle of Los Angeles tournament final	14:41

=== Tournament brackets ===
Battle of Los Angeles (2014)
Tournament information
- Sport: Professional wrestling
- Location: Reseda, Los Angeles, California
- Dates: August 29, 2014–August 31, 2014
- Tournament format: Single elimination tournament
- Participants: 24

Final positions
- Champion: Ricochet
- 1st runner-up: Roderick Strong
- 2nd runner-up: Johnny Gargano

First round
Drew Gulak	Sub
Kyle O'Reilly	17:28
Zack Sabre Jr.	Pin
Adam Cole	18:03
Biff Busick	Pin
Roderick Strong	12:26
A.J. Styles	Sub
Brian Myers	14:10

Quarterfinals
Kyle O'Reilly	Sub
Zack Sabre Jr.	17:00
Roderick Strong	DQ
A.J. Styles	16:35

Semifinals
Kyle O'Reilly	Bye
Roderick Strong

First round
Candice LeRae	Pin
Rich Swann	12:07
Chuck Taylor	Sub
Johnny Gargano	14:00
Michael Elgin	Pin
Tommaso Ciampa	15:15
Trevor Lee	Pin
Cedric Alexander	13:33

Quarterfinals
Candice LeRae	Pin
Johnny Gargano	10:41
Michael Elgin	Pin
Trevor Lee	12:39

Semifinals
Johnny Gargano	Sub
Trevor Lee	15:48

First round
Bobby Fish	Pin
T. J. Perkins	13:47
Ricochet	Pin
Chris Sabin	14:54
ACH	Pin
Kenny Omega	24:34
Matt Sydal	Pin
Chris Hero	18:25

Quarterfinals
T. J. Perkins	Pin
Ricochet	10:23
Kenny Omega	Pin
Matt Sydal	13:49

Semifinals
Ricochet	Pin
Kenny Omega	18:53

Final
Roderick Strong Johnny Gargano	Pin
Ricochet	14:41
