= The North (professional wrestling) =

Professional wrestling tag team

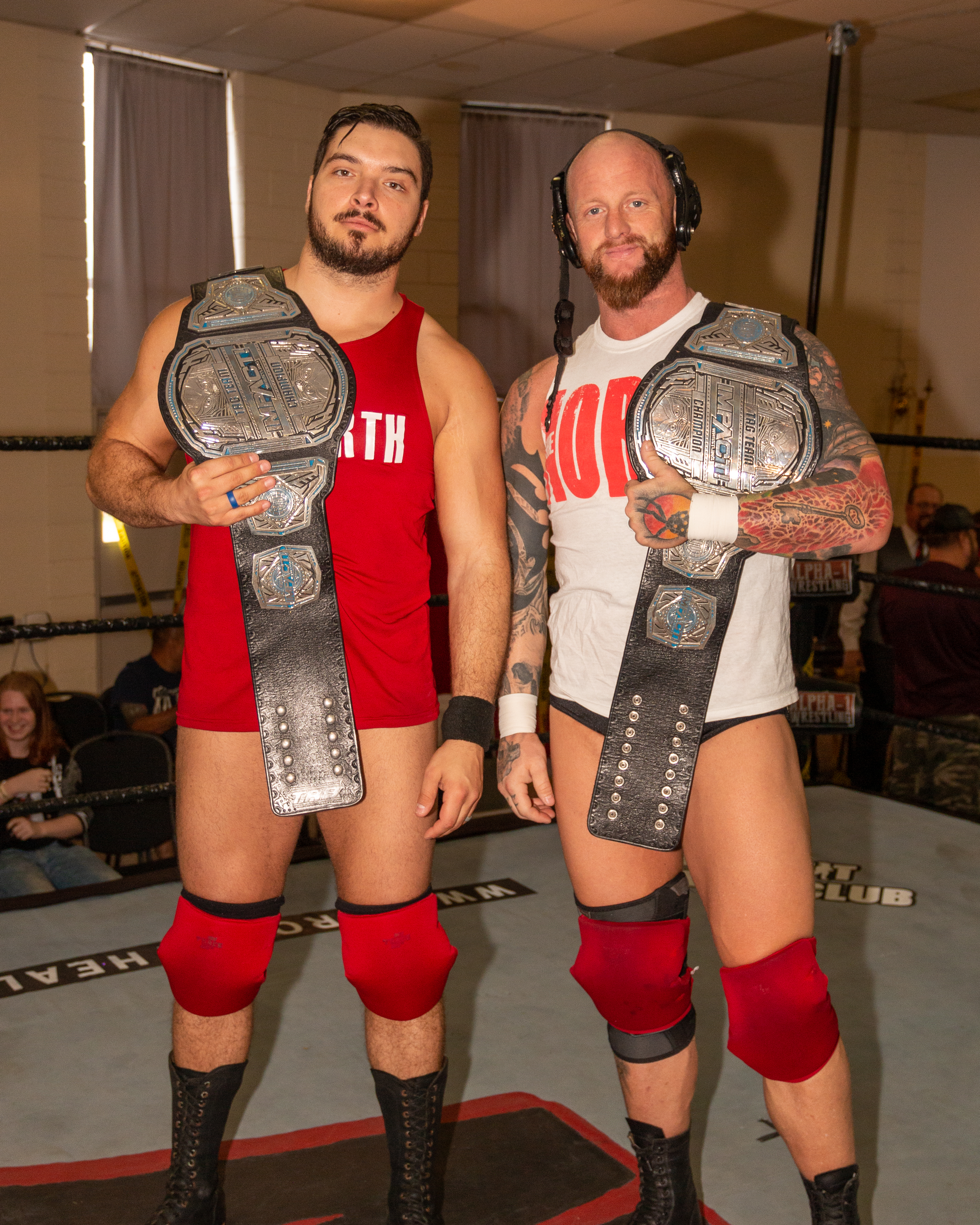
- Ethan Page (left) and Josh Alexander (right) with the Impact World Tag Team Championship in 2019.

Tag team
- Members: Ethan Page; Josh Alexander
- Name(s): The North; The Monster Mafia
- Combined billed weight: 480 lb (220 kg)
- Billed from: Ontario, Canada
- Debut: September 24, 2011
- Disbanded: January 1, 2021
- Years active: 2011–2015; 2019–2021

The North was a Canadian professional wrestling tag team, consisting of Ethan Page and Josh Alexander in Impact Wrestling, where they are former two time World Tag Team Champions. Their first reign with the title was the longest reign in the history of the Impact World Tag Team Championship. They also competed for various promotions on independent circuit.

The team was formed in 2011 as Monster Mafia in the Canadian independent circuit and competed in various independent promotions across the United States and Canada winning numerous tag team titles including the PWG World Tag Team Championship once.

== History ==
=== Independent circuit (2011–2021) ===
Ethan Page stated in a 2020 interview that he used the PWI 500 as an incentive to urge them to work as a tag team pointing out that that area had fewer teams in it, stating "I'll be the loudmouth and you’ll be the ass-kicker, and we’ll become a tag team and start traveling the roads." They made their debut together as a tag team by defeating 4Saken at a Real Championship Wrestling (RCW) event No Remorse. Monster Mafia competed in various independent promotions in the United States and Canada. They won their first tag team titles on September 1, 2013, by defeating The Young Bucks to win the IWL Tag Team Championship at an Insane Wrestling League (IWL) event New Era 8. They held the titles for over a year before losing them back to Young Bucks at New Era 9 on September 28, 2014. They defeated The Goat Brigade to capture the Fringe Pro Wrestling (FPW) Tag Team Championship at FPW's The Showdown. They successfully defended the titles against Goat Brigade at Locked and Loaded until the titles were vacated on October 12.

North would win their next tag team titles by defeating The Besties in the World and The Crew in a three-way match at The Wrestling Revolver event Afraid of the Dark on July 26, 2019. At Alpha-1 Wrestling's event The Purge IV, North won a gauntlet match to win the A1 Tag Team Championship.

=== Ring of Honor (2013–2014) ===
Monster Mafia made their Ring of Honor debut at their supercard A New Dawn on September 28, 2013, in a tag team match against ReDRagon, which they lost. Monster Mafia would make a few more sporadic appearances for ROH. They appeared on the July 26, 2014 episode of Ring of Honor Wrestling, where Page competed under a new ring name "Ethan Gabriel Owens" as they unsuccessfully challenged ReDRagon for the World Tag Team Championship. They lost to The Decade at Death Before Dishonor XII. At All Star Extravaganza VI, they competed in a four-corner survival match against Decade, the team of Moose and R.D. Evans and the team of Caprice Coleman and Takaaki Watanabe, which Moose and Evans won. This would be Monster Mafia's last match in ROH.

=== Pro Wrestling Guerrilla (2015) ===
Monster Mafia debuted for Pro Wrestling Guerrilla at From Out of Nowhere on February 27, 2015, where they competed against The Young Bucks in a losing effort. Monster Mafia made its next appearance at Don't Sweat The Technique, losing to Chris Sabin and Matt Sydal. Monster Mafia participated in the 2015 DDT4 tournament, where they defeated World's Cutest Tag Team, due to interference by Roderick Strong, to capture the World Tag Team Championship in the quarter-final round and defended the titles against Beaver Boys in the semi-final, which they lost. Monster Mafia would lose to World's Cutest Tag Team in their final PWG appearance at Mystery Vortex III: Rock And Shock The Nation. After the title match, the team disbanded since Alexander retired from pro wrestling.

=== Impact Wrestling (2019–2021) ===
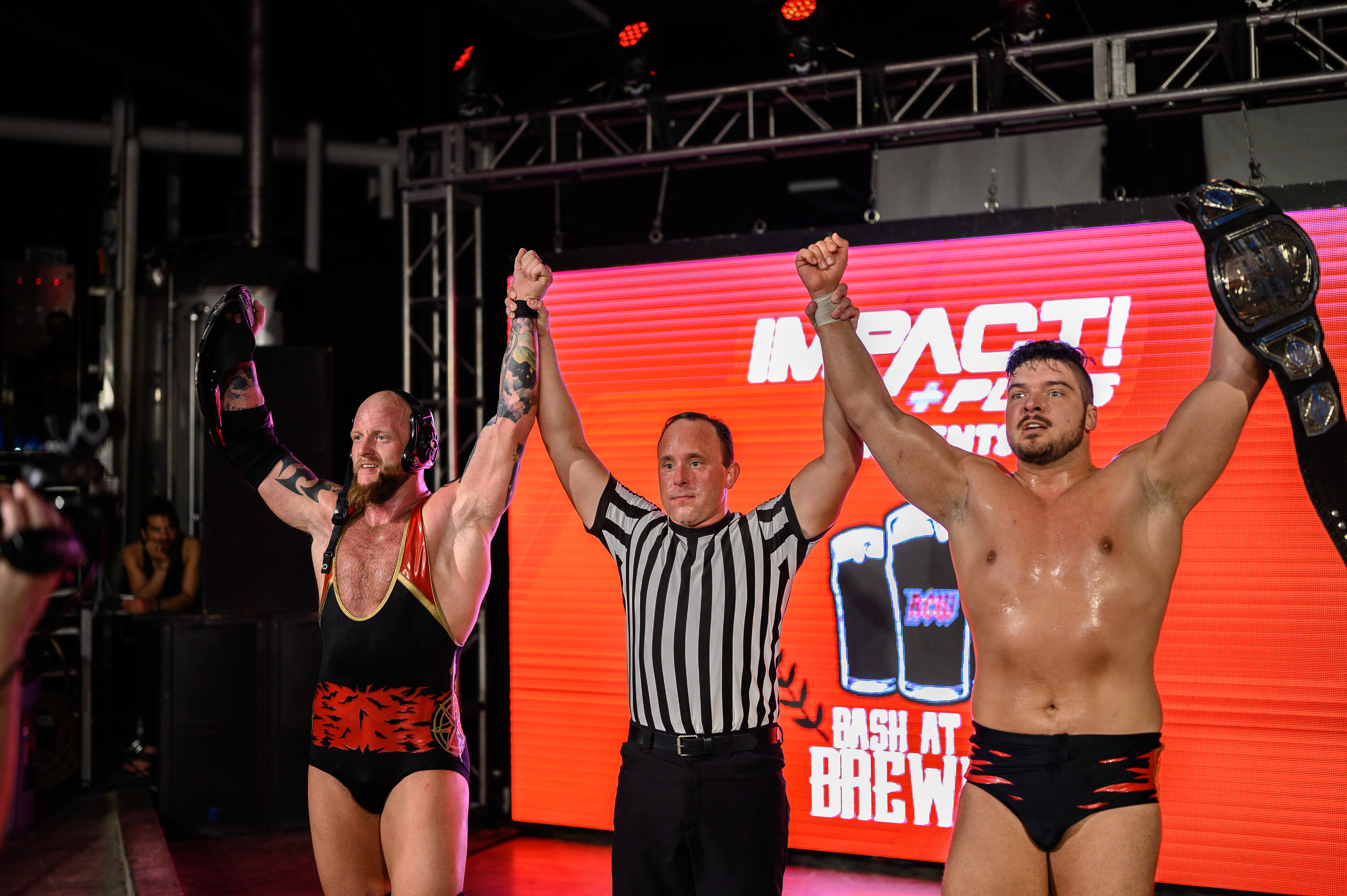
The North after they won the Impact World Tag Team Championship at Bash at the Brewery.

Page joined Impact Wrestling in 2017 and briefly competed as Chandler Park, the storyline cousin of Abyss until he made his re-debut as Page on the October 4, 2018 episode of Impact Wrestling. He competed in the X Division throughout fall 2018 and early 2019 until he reunited Monster Mafia with Josh Alexander in Impact Wrestling. Alexander made his debut in Impact on the April 12 episode of Impact Wrestling alongside Page in a tag team match as they changed their team name to "The North", defeating Sheldon Jean and El Reverso in a tag team match. At Rebellion, North teamed with Moose to defeat The Rascalz in a six-man tag team match. On the June 14 episode of Impact Wrestling, North defeated Rob Van Dam and Sabu to earn a title shot for the World Tag Team Championship at Bash at the Brewery, where North defeated The Latin American Exchange (Santana and Ortiz) to win the tag team titles. They successfully defended the titles against LAX and Rascalz (Dez and Wentz) in a three-way match at Slammiversary XVII. North would successfully defend the titles against Rascalz on the August 2 episode of Impact Wrestling. They made their next successful title defense against Reno Scum and the team of Rich Swann and Willie Mack in a three-way match at Unbreakable.

North retained the titles against LAX on the August 9 episode of Impact Wrestling. North would successfully defend the title against Reno Scum at Cali Combat. On the September 6 episode of Impact Wrestling, North defeated LAX to retain the World Tag Team Championship, which resulted in LAX being forced to leave Impact Wrestling. The duo defended the World Tag Team Championships in Canada against questionable challengers, including against Cody Deaner and Wheels Deaner at the Deaner Compound. They eventually returned on the June 16 Impact! to defeat The Rascalz (Dez and Wentz) in a title match. Unfortunately, no one was watching backstage, and were instead watching Ken Shamrock's Greatest Hits on Impact Plus. The next week, Page went on about people watching Shamrock instead of them, leading to Shamrock challenging Alexander to a match that night. However, The North would attack Shamrock before he even got in the ring. The following week, The North came to address their assault, only for Shamrock to come out looking for a fight. He was eventually joined by Sami Callihan, fighting off The North alongside his rival before disappearing into the night. EVP Scott D'Amore, looking to appease to an irate Ethan Page, scheduled a tag team title match between The North and the team of Shamrock and Callihan for Slammiversary. At the event, Alexander and Page were able to defend the titles against Callihan and Shamrock. After the match, they were challenged by The Motor City Machine Guns for an Impact World Tag Team Championship match on the following episode of Impact. On the July 21 episode of Impact! The North were defeated by the Motor City Machine Guns ending their record 383-day reign as champions. On October 25, The North won the title for the second time, when they defeated The Motor City Machine Guns at Bound for Glory in a four-way tag team match, also involving The Good Brothers (Doc Gallows and Karl Anderson) and the team of Ace Austin and Madman Fulton. On November 14, at Turning Point, The North lost the title to The Good Brothers, ending their reign at 21 days. Then, Alexander and Page started a storyline where they didn't work well together, leading to Page's departure from Impact and the disbanding of The North.

=== Aftermath (2021-2025) ===
After Page's exit, he joined All Elite Wrestling in March 2021, debuting at Revolution in the Face of the Revolution ladder match. Page would remain in AEW for three years, failing to win any titles but being a prominent player in its midcard division, and being a part of the American Top Team and the Firm stables. Page would leave AEW in February 2024 for WWE, where he debuted on its NXT brand in May.

As for Alexander, he remained in IMPACT, where he won the X-Division Championship later in 2021, and would cash it in against IMPACT World Champion Christian Cage at Bound For Glory, winning the title. Alexander would defeat Moose for his second IMPACT World Title at Rebellion 2022, holding it for almost a year before dropping it due to injury in March 2023. Alexander would return at Slammiversary, but would fail to regain the title. Alexander would remain in IMPACT (later reverted back to the TNA name) before leaving the company in February 2025.

== Championships and accomplishments ==
- Alpha-1 Wrestling
  - A1 Tag Team Championship (1 time)
- Fringe Pro Wrestling
  - FPW Tag Team Championship (1 time)
- Impact Wrestling
  - Impact World Tag Team Championship (2 times)
  - Impact Year End Awards (2 times)
    - Tag Team of the Year (2019, 2020)
- Insane Wrestling League
  - IWL Tag Team Championship (1 time)
- International Wrestling Cartel
  - IWC Tag Team Championship (1 time)
- Pro Wrestling Guerrilla
  - PWG World Tag Team Championship (1 time)
- Pro Wrestling Illustrated
  - Ranked No. 4 of the top 50 Tag Teams in the PWI Tag Team 50 in 2020
- The Wrestling Revolver
  - PWR Tag Team Championship (1 time)
