= Death Before Dishonor XII =

2014 professional wrestling event

- Promotional poster for the Milwaukee show
- Promotion: Ring of Honor
- Date: August 22 and 23, 2014
- City: Night 1: Milwaukee, Wisconsin; Night 2: Chicago Ridge, Illinois
- Venue: Night 1: The Turner Hall Ballroom; Night 2: Frontier Fieldhouse
- Attendance: Night 1: 600; Night 2: 800

Pay-per-view chronology
← Previous; Field of Honor	Next → All Star Extravaganza VI

Death Before Dishonor chronology
← Previous; XI	Next → XIII

Death Before Dishonor XII was the 12th Death Before Dishonor professional wrestling event produced by Ring of Honor (ROH), which took place on August 22 and 23, 2014, two nights at two venues The Turner Hall Ballroom in Milwaukee, Wisconsin and Frontier Fieldhouse in Chicago Ridge, Illinois.

== Production ==
Other on-screen personnel
Role	Name
Commentators	Kevin Kelly
Commentators	Steve Corino
Commentators	Caprice Coleman

=== Storylines ===
Death Before Dishonor XII featured professional wrestling matches, involving different wrestlers from pre-existing scripted feuds, plots, and storylines that played out on ROH's television programs. Wrestlers portrayed villains or heroes as they followed a series of events that built tension and culminated in a wrestling match or series of matches.

== Results ==
=== Night 1 ===
No.	Results	Stipulations	Times
1^{D}	The Addiction (Christopher Daniels and Frankie Kazarian) defeated The Kingdom (Adam Cole and Michael Bennett) (with Maria Kanellis)	Tag team match	11:17
2	Adam Pearce defeated Tadarius Thomas	Singles match	7:30
3	Tommaso Ciampa defeated Jimmy Jacobs by submission	Singles match	6:46
4	AJ Styles defeated Kyle O'Reilly (with Bobby Fish)	Singles match	17:29
5	A. C. H. defeated Jay Lethal (with Truth Martini) and Adam Page and B. J. Whitmer and Bobby Fish and Cedric Alexander	Six Man Mayhem match	9:22
6	Hanson defeated Roderick Strong (with B. J. Whitmer)	Singles match	11:12
7	The Briscoes (Jay Briscoe and Mark Briscoe) defeated The Young Bucks (Matt Jackson and Nick Jackson)	Tag team match	12:45
8	Michael Elgin (c) defeated Silas Young	Singles match for the ROH World Championship	21:23
(c) / – the champion(s) heading into the match; D / – this was a dark match

=== Night 2 ===
No.	Results	Stipulations	Times
1^{D}	Will Ferrara, Cheeseburger and Louis Lyndon defeated Mike Psyko, Matt Sells and Stokely Hathaway	Six-man tag team match	7:20
2	The Decade (Jimmy Jacobs and Roderick Strong) (with Adam Page and Tadarius Thomas) defeated Monster Mafia (Ethan Gabriel Owens and Josh Alexander)	Tag team match	10:45
3	Jay Lethal (c) (with Truth Martini) defeated Caprice Coleman	Singles match for the ROH Television Championship	11:46
4	A. C. H. defeated Michael Bennett (with Maria Kanellis), B. J. Whitmer and Silas Young	Four Corner Survival match	13:04
5	Adam Cole defeated Hanson	Singles match	10:33
6	Michael Elgin (c) defeated Tommaso Ciampa	Singles match for the ROH World Championship	15:58
7	Adam Page defeated Adam Pearce	Singles match	8:00
8	AJ Styles defeated Cedric Alexander	Singles match	17:24
9	The Young Bucks (Matt Jackson and Nick Jackson) and reDRagon (Bobby Fish and Kyle O'Reilly) defeated The Addiction (Christopher Daniels and Frankie Kazarian) and The Briscoes (Jay Briscoe and Mark Briscoe)	Eight-man tag team match	23:04
(c) / – the champion(s) heading into the match; D / – this was a dark match

== See also ==
- 2014 in professional wrestling
