= World's Cutest Tag Team =

Professional wrestling tag team

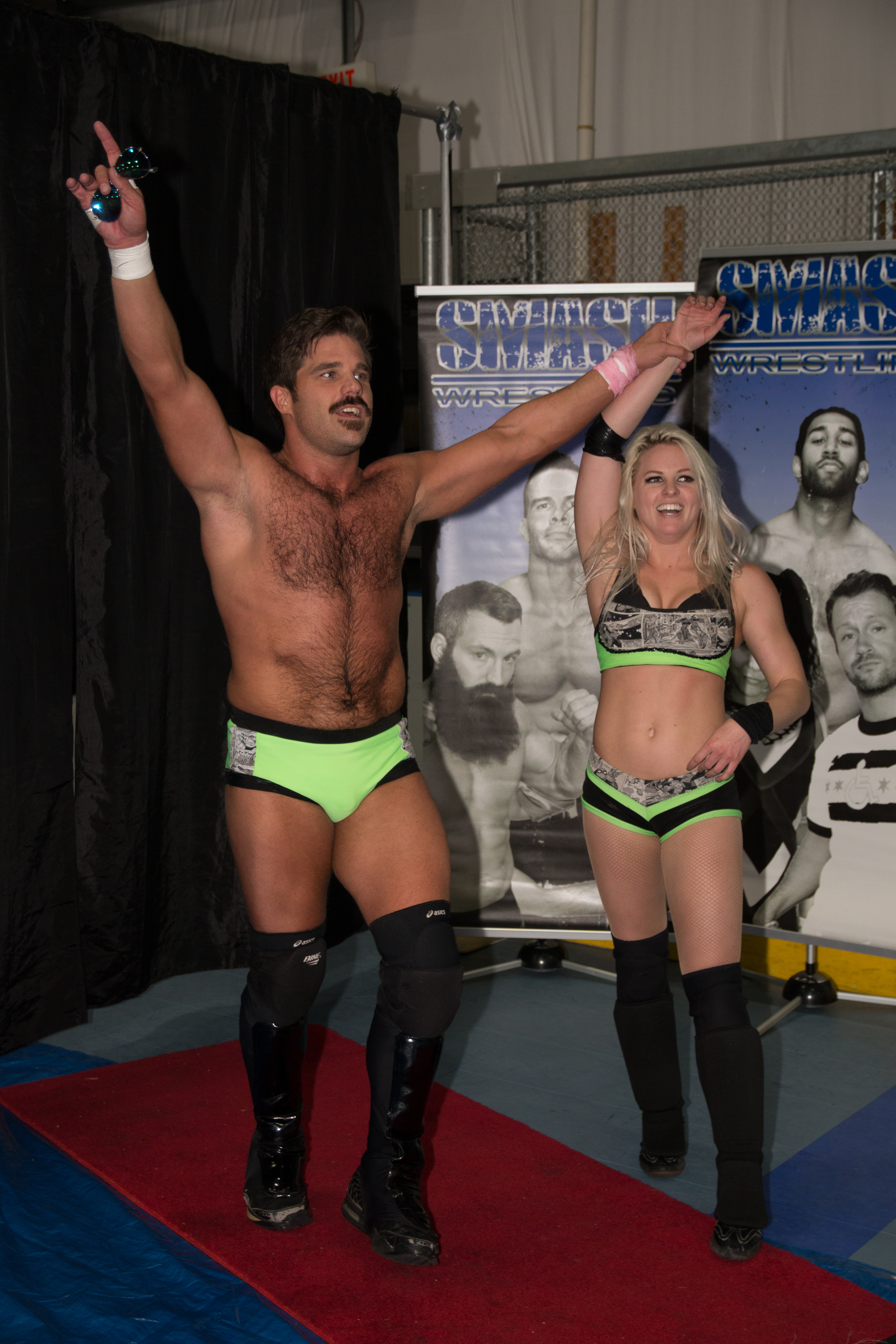
- Candice LeRae (right) and Joey Ryan (left) In November 2014

Tag team
- Members: Candice LeRae; Joey Ryan
- Name(s): World's Cutest Tag Team
- Billed heights: 5 ft 2 in (1.57 m) - LeRae; 5 ft 10 in (1.78 m) - Ryan
- Combined billed weight: 320 lb (150 kg)
- Hometown: California
- Debut: October 19, 2013
- Disbanded: January 16, 2018

World's Cutest Tag Team was an American professional wrestling tag team consisting of Candice LeRae and Joey Ryan. They are former one-time Pro Wrestling Guerrilla (PWG) World Tag Team Champions.

== History ==
=== Pro Wrestling Guerrilla (2013–2015) ===
Joey Ryan formed a partnership with Candice LeRae, which led to the two unsuccessfully challenging The Young Bucks for the PWG World Tag Team Championship on October 19, 2013. On July 27, 2014, at Eleven, Ryan and LeRae defeated The Young Bucks in a Guerrilla Warfare match to become the new PWG World Tag Team Champions. On August 29, 2014, Candice and Joey, now known as World's Cutest Tag Team, successfully defended the PWG World Tag Team Championship in a three-way match, against The Addiction (Christopher Daniels and Frankie Kazarian) and the Inner City Machine Guns (Rich Swann and Ricochet). On October 17, 2014, World's Cutest Tag Team successfully defended their title again, beating Johnny Gargano and Chuck Taylor. They lost the title to Monster Mafia (Ethan Page and Josh Alexander) on May 22, 2015, in the opening round of the Dynamite Duumvirate Tag Team Title Tournament.

=== Independent circuit (2013–2016) ===
On May 5, 2014, Ryan and LeRae entered the WSU Queen & King Of The Ring 2014 Tournament defeating Niya and Rick Cataldo in the quarter-final round of the tournament. Later on they defeated Drew Gulak and Kimber Lee in the semifinals before being defeated by Matt Tremont and Mickie Knuckles in the finals of the tournament. Ryan and LeRae have also worked together in Japan for Dramatic Dream Team (DDT). On March 26, 2016, the two unsuccessfully challenged Daisuke Sasaki and Shuji Ishikawa for the KO-D Tag Team Championship. The team disbanded on January 16, 2018, when LeRae signed with WWE.

== Championships and accomplishments ==
- Dreamwave Wrestling
  - Dreamwave Tag Team Championship (1 time)
- Fighting Spirit Pro Wrestling
  - FSP Tag Team Championship (1 time)
- Pro Wrestling Guerrilla
  - PWG World Tag Team Championship (1 time)
