= SoCal Uncensored =

Professional wrestling tag team

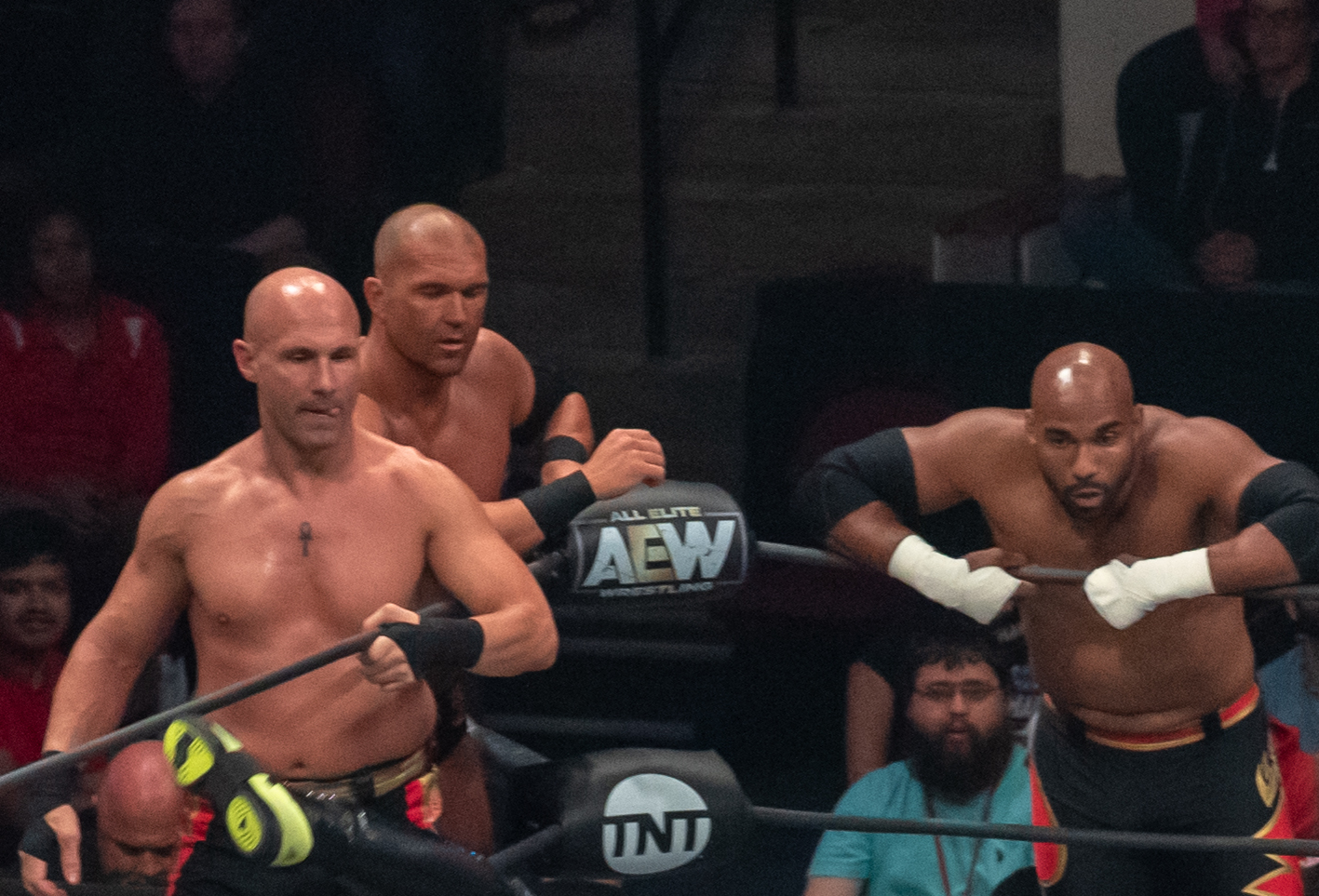
- Christopher Daniels, Frankie Kazarian and Scorpio Sky

Tag team
- Members: Christopher Daniels; Frankie Kazarian / Kazarian; Scorpio Sky
- Name(s): The Addiction; Bad Influence; Legion of Boom; SoCal Uncensored (SCU)
- Billed heights: Daniels: 6 ft 0 in (1.83 m); Kazarian: 6 ft 1 in (1.85 m)
- Combined billed weight: 439 lb (199 kg)
- Billed from: Southern California
- Debut: January 5, 2012
- Disbanded: May 12, 2021
- Years active: 2012–2021

SoCal Uncensored (SCU) was an American professional wrestling stable that consisted of Christopher Daniels, Frankie Kazarian, and Scorpio Sky.

Daniels and Kazarian formed a tag team during their time in Total Nonstop Action Wrestling (TNA). Describing themselves as "The World Tag Team Champions of the World", they won the TNA World Tag Team Championship twice. After a feud with A.J. Styles, they became known as Bad Influence, and remained with the promotion until 2014.

After leaving TNA, both signed with Ring of Honor (ROH), where they worked as The Addiction, winning the ROH World Tag Team Championship twice. Later, Scorpio Sky joined the team, forming a stable known as SoCal Uncensored (SCU). During this time, the trio were ROH World Six-Man Tag Team Champions, and Kazarian and Sky were ROH World Tag Team Champions.

The trio left ROH in 2019 and signed with AEW, where Kazarian and Sky became the inaugural AEW World Tag Team Champions. Daniels and Kazarian resumed their partnership in March 2020, after Sky began focusing on singles competition in early 2020 and then formed a heel tag team with Ethan Page in March 2021. In another pursuit for the AEW World Tag Team Championship, Daniels and Kazarian imposed a stipulation on themselves that if they lost a match, they would disband. This came in May 2021 when they lost a championship match to reigning champions The Young Bucks.

== History ==
=== Bad Influence/The Addiction (2011–2017) ===
==== Total Nonstop Action Wrestling ====
===== Fortune (2011) =====
Christopher Daniels and Kazarian were first united in TNA as members of the stable Fortune in 2011. Kazarian had been one of the first two founding members of Fortune alongside A.J. Styles from the group's formation in 2010, while Daniels would make his second return to TNA to join Fortune in their feud against Immortal after Styles was injured heading into the 2011 Lockdown pay-per-view. After Lockdown went by with Fortune defeating Immortal in the Lethal Lockdown main event, Daniels was confirmed as a member of Fortune, and he and Kazarian, who was X-Division Champion at the time and would lose it about a month later, would continue on in that capacity for the next few months. This would lead up to Destination X on July 10, TNA's first ever all X Division pay-per-view, where Kazarian would defeat Samoa Joe while Daniels would face Styles in the main event, with Styles emerging victorious. For weeks after this, Daniels would begin talking to Styles on an unknown matter for a number of weeks, heading into Hardcore Justice, where A.J., Daniels, and Kazarian would defeat three members of Immortal in a tag match.

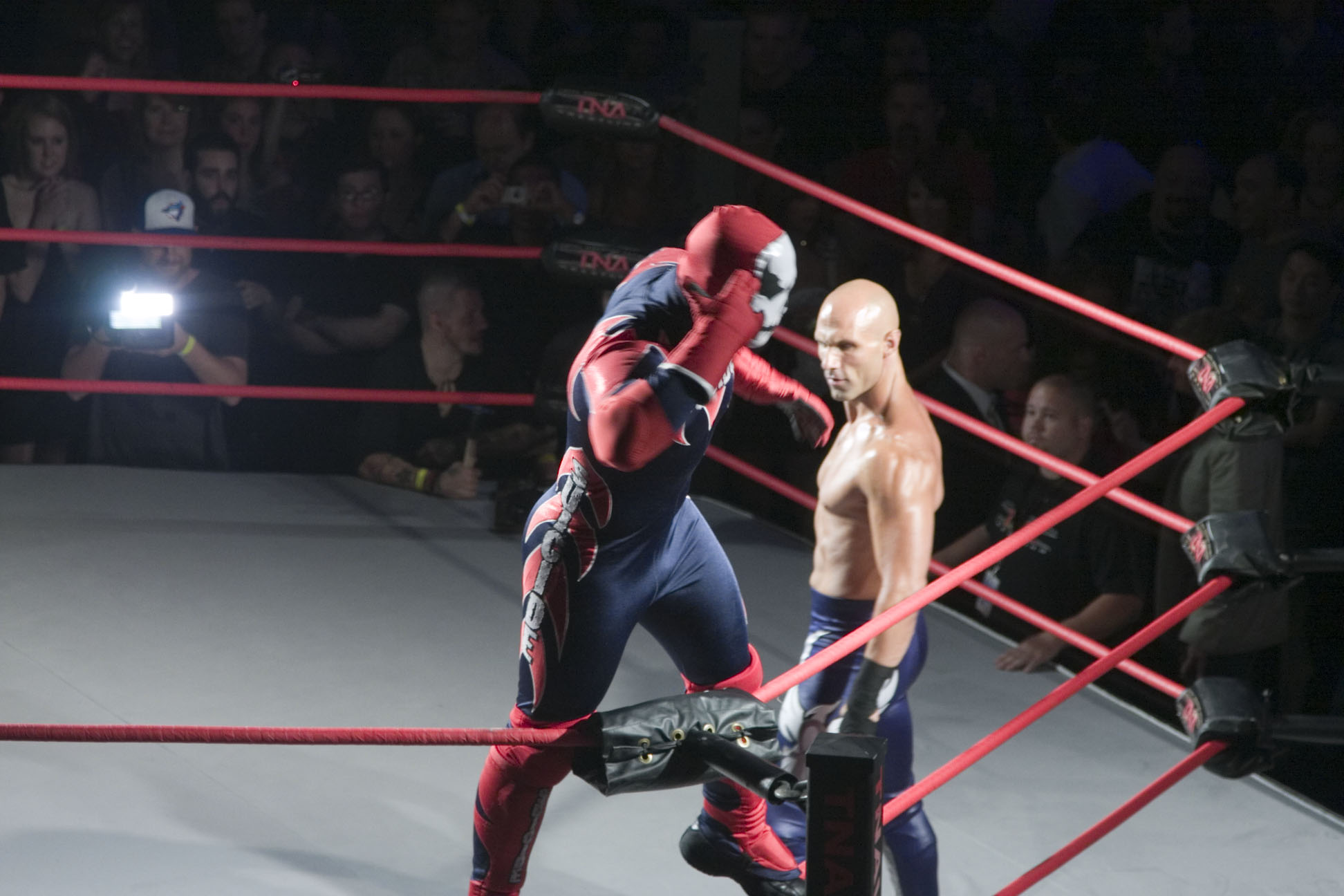
Kazarian as Suicide posing next to Daniels, who once played the character

Soon after this, it was revealed that Daniels wanted a rematch of their Destination X encounter, which Styles finally granted on the September 1 episode of Impact Wrestling, where Daniels managed to pick up the win. After the match, however, Daniels refused to shake hands with Styles. On the September 22 episode of Impact Wrestling, Daniels refused to return the favor and give Styles a rematch, which eventually led to a brawl between the two. When the two were finally separated from each other by Kazarian, Daniels kicked Styles in the groin, completing his heel turn and leaving Fortune. Two weeks later it was announced that, at Daniels' request, he and Styles would face each other at Bound for Glory in an "I Quit" match. On October 16 at Bound for Glory, Daniels submitted in the "I Quit" match after being threatened with a screwdriver, but continued the feud by attacking Styles after the match. On the October 27 episode of Impact Wrestling, Daniels entered a feud with Rob Van Dam after hitting him with a toolbox during a match between the two and thus losing via disqualification. This feud would involve Van Dam stopping Daniels from using a screwdriver in a match against Styles on the November 10 episode of Impact Wrestling, as well as two straight pay-per-view losses to Van Dam on November 13 at Turning Point and on December 11 at Final Resolution.

===== TNA World Tag Team Champions (2012–2013) =====
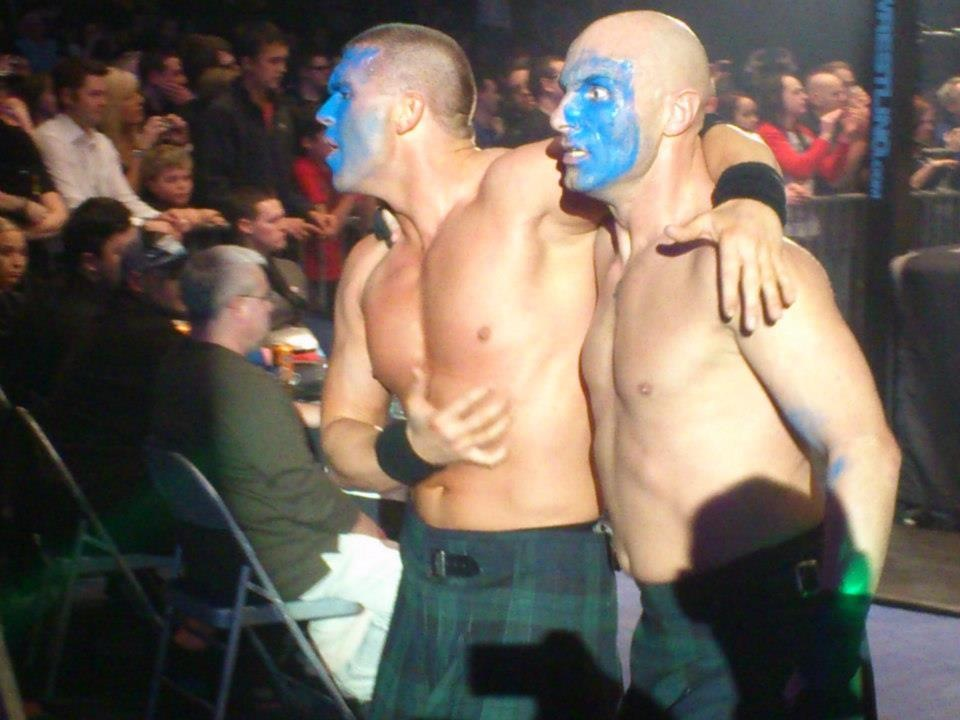
Daniels and Kazarian, dressed as William Wallace, mocking fans in Scotland

Daniels then returned to his rivalry with A.J. Styles, managing to convince Kazarian to turn on him on the January 5, 2012 episode of Impact Wrestling, effectively putting the nail in the coffin of the now defunct Fortune. On the February 9 episode of Impact Wrestling, Daniels defeated Styles in a singles match with help from Kazarian, who was now showing signs that Daniels was holding something over his head and had forced him to turn on Styles against his will. On March 18 at Victory Road, Daniels and Kazarian were defeated in a tag team match by Styles and Mr. Anderson. The rivalry continued on April 15 at Lockdown, where the two duos were on opposing teams in the annual Lethal Lockdown match. Styles' and Anderson's team, led by Garett Bischoff, ended up defeating Daniels' and Kazarian's team, led by Eric Bischoff.

During Styles' absence from Impact Wrestling, Daniels and Kazarian set their sights on the TNA World Tag Team Championship, attacking champions Magnus and Samoa Joe on the April 26 episode. On the May 10 episode of Impact Wrestling, Kazarian revealed that he originally aligned himself with Daniels to keep him from revealing Styles' secret, but changed his mind after learning what the secret was. Daniels then revealed the secret, a series of photographs insinuating a relationship between Styles and TNA president Dixie Carter. Three days later at Sacrifice, Daniels and Kazarian defeated Magnus and Samoa Joe to win the TNA World Tag Team Championship for the first time. Later in the event, Daniels and Kazarian cost Styles his match with Kurt Angle, who afterwards turned on the two, saving Styles from a beatdown. On May 31, Daniels main evented a live episode of Impact Wrestling, losing to Styles in a singles grudge match. After the match, Daniels and Kazarian attacked both Styles and Angle, who attempted to make the save, before rolling an audio of a phone conversation to prove an affair between Styles and Carter. The tape was abruptly cut short by Carter ending the show. On June 10 at Slammiversary, Daniels and Kazarian lost the TNA World Tag Team Championship to Styles and Angle.

On the following episode of Impact Wrestling, Daniels entered the 2012 Bound for Glory Series, taking part in the opening gauntlet match, from which he eliminated both Styles and Angle, before being eliminated himself by James Storm. On the June 21 episode of Impact Wrestling, Styles and Carter proved that Daniels and Kazarian had been lying about their relationship by producing a pregnant woman named Claire Lynch, whom they had been helping overcome her addictions. The following week, Kazarian teased dissension with Daniels, claiming that he had been lied to. However, in the main event of the evening, Kazarian revealed that he was still on Daniels' side, when the two defeated Styles and Angle, after Kazarian hit Styles with a steel chair, to regain the TNA World Tag Team Championship. Following the win, Daniels admitted that Styles and Carter had told the truth about Claire, but claimed that they had left out the part about Styles being the father of her unborn baby. On July 8 at Destination X, Daniels was defeated by Styles in a Last Man Standing match. On the August 8 episode of Impact Wrestling, Daniels and Kazarian, billing themselves as "The World Tag Team Champions of the World", made their first televised defense of the TNA World Tag Team Championship, defeating Devon and Garett Bischoff. Daniels' participation in the 2012 Bound for Glory Series ended on the following episode of Impact Wrestling with a loss against A.J. Styles, leaving him outside a spot in the semifinals. As a result of the win, Styles also earned a paternity test, which revealed that Claire was not pregnant at all. The storyline ended with Claire, through her attorney, revealing Daniels' and Kazarian's plot to blackmail Styles with her fake pregnancy. On September 6 as part of the first "Championship Thursday", Daniels and Kazarian successfully defended the TNA World Tag Team Championship against Chavo Guerrero Jr. and Hernandez. Three days later at No Surrender, Daniels and Kazarian made another successful title defense against previous champions, Styles and Angle. On October 14 at Bound for Glory, Daniels and Kazarian lost the TNA World Tag Team Championship to Guerrero and Hernandez in a three-way match, which also included Styles and Angle. Daniels and Kazarian received their rematch on November 11 at Turning Point, but were again defeated by Guerrero and Hernandez. On December 9 at Final Resolution, Daniels defeated A.J. Styles in what was billed as their "final match", after hitting Styles with his own Styles Clash finisher.

===== Extraordinary Gentleman's Organization (2013–2014) =====
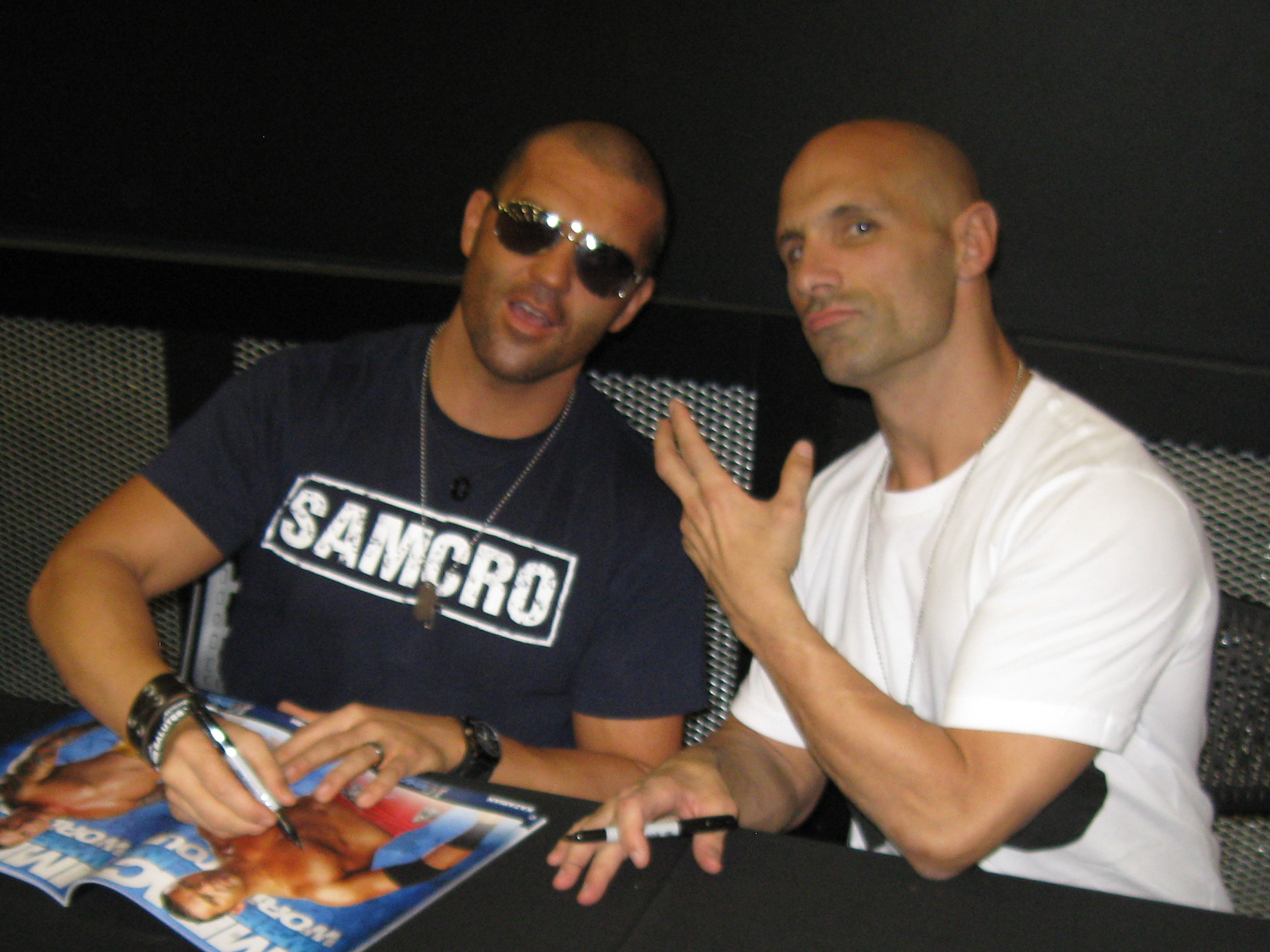
Kazarian and Daniels signing autographs

Daniels and Kazarian then dubbed their tag team Bad Influence and began a rivalry with James Storm after he defeated Kazarian at Final Resolution, and again on the January 3, 2013 episode of Impact Wrestling. On January 13 at Genesis, Daniels defeated Storm in a number one contenders match for the TNA World Heavyweight Championship. Daniels received his title shot on the January 24 episode of Impact Wrestling, but was defeated by defending champion Jeff Hardy. On March 10 at Lockdown, Bad Influence unsuccessfully challenged Austin Aries and Bobby Roode for the TNA World Tag Team Championship in a three-way match, also involving Chavo Guerrero Jr. and Hernandez. In April, Daniels and Kazarian began teasing a Fortune reunion to battle the Aces & Eights stable, however, this plan was foiled by Styles and Roode both turning down offers to join them. Bad Influence faced Aries and Roode in a number one contenders match on the May 9 episode of Impact Wrestling, however, the match ended in a no contest after special guest referee James Storm superkicked Daniels and Aries and walked out on the match. On June 2 at Slammiversary XI, Bad Influence failed to capture the TNA World Tag Team Championship from Guerrero and Hernandez in a fatal four-way elimination match, which also included Aries and Roode and was won by Gunner and James Storm. On the June 13 episode of Impact Wrestling, Daniels and Kazarian defeated Gunner and Storm in a non-title match to qualify for the 2013 Bound for Glory Series. While Daniels started off the series with seven points with pinfall victory over Hernandez, Kazarian would go on to lose all of his beginning matches. On the July 11 episode of Impact Wrestling, Kazarian and Roode defeated Daniels and Aries in a tag team match, with Kazarian pinning his Bad Influence partner for the win, to qualify for the BFG series gauntlet match later in the evening. During the match, however, Kazarian was the first man eliminated by Styles.

On the August 8 episode of Impact Wrestling, Daniels and Kazarian faced off in a BFG series match, but despite teasing tension earlier in the night, got themselves intentionally counted out to each gain two points in the tournament. Afterwards, Daniels and Kazarian allied themselves with Roode to form a new force, intended for one of the three to win the Bound for Glory series. With each other's help, both Kazarian and Roode picked up twenty points each in the BFG series on August 15 at Impact Wrestling: Hardcore Justice, with Kazarian winning a four-way ladder match and Roode winning a four-way tables match. The following week, the trio labelled themselves the Extraordinary Gentlemen's Organization (EGO) and Roode and Kazarian went on to defeat TNA World Tag Team Champions Gunner and James Storm in a non-title match. EGO would also try to recruit Roode's former tag team partner Austin Aries but Aries answered their offer by attacking Daniels and costing him his BFG series match. At TNA No Surrender 2013, Roode was defeated by Magnus, and later, EGO interfered and attacked both Styles and Magnus in the finals. At the next edition, EGO defeated Mafia. Since then, the trio teamed up very rarely, as they were in different storylines – Kazarian and Daniels began feuding with Eric Young and Abyss, while Roode was in the TNA World Title Tournament. At TNA Turning Point, Roode defeated longtime rival James Storm in a Florida Death Match to advance in TNA World Title Tournament while Bad Influence insulted Abyss' brother Joseph Park.

At Bound for Glory, Bad Influence were defeated by Young and Park in a Gauntlet match. After being eliminated, both attacked Park and made him bleed. The same night, Abyss appeared and attacked Bad Influence. Over the following weeks, Bad Influence mocked Park and tried to reveal his true identity. On the December 5 episode of Impact Wrestling, Bad Influence revealed Park's Law Firm was closed 13 years ago. On the December 12 episode of Impact Wrestling, Bad Influence were defeated by Park and Eric Young, when Young made Park bleed. On the December 26 episode of Impact Wrestling, Bad Influence were defeated again by Park in a Monster's Ball match. On March 2, 2014, Bad Influence were part of a group of TNA wrestlers that took part in Wrestle-1's Kaisen: Outbreak event in Tokyo, Japan, defeating Junior Stars (Koji Kanemoto and Minoru Tanaka) in a tag team match. On March 9, 2014 at TNA Lockdown, Bad Influence along with Chris Sabin were defeated by Wrestle-1's The Great Muta, Sanada, and Yasu in a six-man interpromotional tag team steel cage match. On April 12, 2014, at TNA One Night Only's X-Travaganza 2 event Bad Influence were defeated by The Wolves (Eddie Edwards and Davey Richards) in the EC3 Invitational Ladder match where the winners received $25,000. This was Daniels' last TNA appearance, as he announced his departure from TNA on April 23. Kazarian also left TNA following May 10.

==== Independent circuit (2013–2019) ====
While Bad Influence were in TNA, they appeared in other promotions. On April 29, 2013, Bad Influence were defeated by The Young Bucks at Quintessential Pro Wrestling. Two days later, they wrestled in Puerto Rico for World Wrestling League, Bad Influence and Bobby Roode were defeated by Adam Pearce, James Storm and Samoa Joe in a main event dark match. On January 24, 2014, Bad Influence appeared at Big Time Wrestling's Battle Royal, where they defeated The Ballard Brothers (Shane Ballard & Shannon Ballard). On April 5, 2014, Kazarian and Daniels returned to the independent circuit at Dragon Gate USA's Mercury Rising in a Dark Main Event defeating the Open The United Gate Champions The Bravado Brothers. The same day they defeated OI4K at the CZW WrestleCon. On June 6, 2014, Bad Influence made their debuts in Tommy Dreamer's House of Hardcore at HOH 4, defeating Outlaw Inc. (Eddie Kingston and Homicide). On June 7, 2014, Bad Influence returned to House of Hardcore at HOH 5, defeating Petey Williams and Tony Nese. On June 14, 2014, at HOH 6, Bad Influence was defeated by The Young Bucks. On August 29, Daniels and Kazarian unsuccessfully challenged The World's Cutest Tag Team (Candice LeRae and Joey Ryan) for the PWG World Tag Team Championship in a three-way match, which also included the Inner City Machine Guns (Rich Swann and Ricochet).

==== New Japan Pro-Wrestling (2015) ====
On November 9, 2015, it was announced that The Addiction would be a part of New Japan Pro-Wrestling's 2015 World Tag League. On November 21, 2015, The Addiction made their debut defeating Juice Robinson and Tiger Mask. The Addiction finished the tournament with a record of three wins and three losses, failing to advance from their block.

==== Ring of Honor (2014–2017) ====
On May 18, 2014, it was announced that Christopher Daniels and Frankie Kazarian would debut as a team in Ring of Honor. At Best in the World on June 22, 2014, Daniels and Kazarian unsuccessfully challenged reDRagon (Kyle O'Reilly and Bobby Fish) for the ROH World Tag Team Championship. On July 18, Daniels and Kazarian returned to ROH, defeating Adam Cole and Jay Lethal. On July 19, Daniels and Kazarian defeated War Machine (Hanson and Raymond Rowe), The Briscoe Brothers (Jay Briscoe and Mark Briscoe), and The Decade (Roderick Strong and Jimmy Jacobs) in a four-way tag team match to become number one contenders for the ROH World Tag Team Championship. At Field of Honor, they received their ROH Tag Team title shot, but they were defeated by reDRagon after interference from The Decade, beginning a feud between the teams. On September 6, 2014, billed as The Addiction, Daniels and Kazarian defeated Strong and Jacobs.

On November 23, 2014, The Addiction were defeated by reDRagon in the 2014 Tag Wars Tournament finals which also included A. C. H. & Matt Sydal and The Briscoes. On March 1, 2015, at ROH 13th Anniversary Show, The Addiction were defeated by The Kingdom (Michael Bennett and Matt Taven) in a three-way tag team match that also included a partnerless Karl Anderson. On April 4, 2015, The Addiction defeated reDRagon to win the ROH World Tag Team Championship, revealing themselves along with Chris Sabin as the villainous masked group known as KRD, turning heel in the process. On September 18, 2015, at All Star Extravaganza VII, Daniels and Kazarian lost the tag team titles to Bennett and Taven in a three-way tag team match also involving The Young Bucks.

In 2016, Sabin and Alex Shelley reformed their team The Motor City Machine Guns and began a feud with The Addiction. On May 9, 2016, at War of the Worlds, The Addiction defeated War Machine to win the ROH World Tag Team Championship for the second time. On September 30, 2016, at All Star Extravaganza VIII, The Addiction lost the ROH World Tag Team Championship to The Young Bucks in a three-way ladder match that also included The Motor City Machine Guns.

In early 2017, The Addiction began feuding with Bullet Club, turning face in the process. On February 11, 2017, Kazarian seemingly turned on Daniels and joined Bullet Club; however, on March 10, Kazarian turned on Bullet Club and Adam Cole, revealing that his betrayal was a ruse designed to trick Cole all along, helping Daniels become the ROH World Champion for the first time in his career. On December 15, at Final Battle, The Addiction lost against War Machine.

=== SoCal Uncensored (2017–2021) ===
==== Ring of Honor (2017–2018) ====
At Final Battle in December 2017, Scorpio Sky joined Daniels and Kazarian, becoming known as SoCal Uncensored. They chose the name SoCal Uncensored in homage to the website SoCalUncensored.com, which has been a staple of the Southern California pro-wrestling scene since the 1990s. They asked for and were granted permission from the website to use the name.

On night one of the March 2018 16th Anniversary Show, SCU defeated The Hung Bucks (Adam Page, Matt Jackson and Nick Jackson) to win the ROH Six-Man Tag Team Championship. On night one of War of the Worlds, they dropped it to The Kingdom (Matt Taven, T. K. O'Ryan and Vinny Marseglia), ending their reign at 61 days. On October 14, at Glory By Honor XVI, Kazarian and Sky won the ROH World Tag Team Championship in a three-way match involving The Briscoe Brothers and the Young Bucks. On December 14, at Final Battle, Kazarian and Sky dropped the titles back to the Briscoes in a Ladder War, also ending their reign at 61 days. The next day, SoCal Uncensored left ROH., and Christopher Daniels would wrestle one more match in 2019.

==== All Elite Wrestling (2019–2021) ====
On January 3, 2019, it was announced that SoCal Uncensored would be taking part in a rally for All Elite Wrestling (AEW), confirming their involvement with the company. On the October 30 episode of Dynamite, Kazarian and Sky defeated the Lucha Brothers to become the inaugural AEW World Tag Team Champions. In their first defense of the Tag Team Championship, Sky and Kazarian defeated both the Lucha Brothers and Private Party at Full Gear on November 9. Sky and Kazarian would lose the Tag Team Championship to Kenny Omega and "Hangman" Adam Page at Chris Jericho's Rock 'N' Wrestling Rager at Sea Part Deux: Second Wave. Since then, Sky has mainly focused on singles competition, while Daniels and Kazarian focused on tag team competition. On the September 30, 2020, episode of Dynamite, Sky once again teamed up with Kazarian to unsuccessfully challenge FTR (Cash Wheeler and Dax Harwood) for the AEW World Tag Team Championship. Over the next few months, Daniels and Kazarian began focusing on the AEW World Tag Team Championship, and Kazarian made the ultimatum that they would split as a team if they lose a match again. Meanwhile, Sky pursued the AEW TNT Championship, winning the Face of the Revolution ladder match at Revolution to challenge Darby Allin for the title, but was unsuccessful in winning it on Dynamite, and post-match, Sky turned heel by getting Allin into a submission hold and refusing to let go. On the March 29, 2021 episode of the Wrestling with the Week podcast, which Sky cohosts, Daniels and Kazarian made a guest appearance and Sky confirmed that they were still a group. However, it was around this time that Sky had begun tagging with Ethan Page, which put his status as a member of SCU in doubt. On the May 12 edition of Dynamite, SCU lost an AEW World Tag Team Championship match to The Young Bucks, thus ending the team.

== Championships and accomplishments ==
- All Elite Wrestling
  - AEW World Tag Team Championship (1 time, inaugural) – Kazarian and Sky
  - AEW World Tag Team Championship Tournament (2019)
- DDT Pro-Wrestling
  - Ironman Heavymetalweight Championship (1 time) – Daniels and Kazarian
- Pro Wrestling Illustrated
  - Inspirational Wrestler of the Year (2017) – Daniels
  - Daniels ranked No. 45 of the top 500 singles wrestlers in the PWI 500 in 2013
  - Kazarian ranked No. 56 of the top 500 singles wrestlers in the PWI 500 in 2013
- Ring of Honor
  - ROH World Championship (1 time) – Daniels
  - ROH World Six-Man Tag Team Championship (1 time)
  - ROH World Tag Team Championship (3 times) – Daniels and Kazarian (2), Kazarian and Sky (1)
- Total Nonstop Action Wrestling
  - TNA World Tag Team Championship (2 times) – Daniels and Kazarian
  - TNA World Cup of Wrestling (2013) – Daniels and Kazarian with James Storm, Kenny King, and Mickie James
- Wrestling Observer Newsletter
  - Tag Team of the Year (2012) – Daniels and Kazarian

New championship	1st AEW World Tag Team Champions; October 30, 2019–January 21, 2020	Succeeded by Kenny Omega and Adam Page
