= All Star Extravaganza VI =

Professional wrestling pay-per-view event in 2014

- Promotion: Ring of Honor
- Date: September 6, 2014
- City: Toronto, Ontario, Canada
- Venue: Mattamy Athletic Center
- Attendance: 1,100

Pay-per-view chronology
← Previous; Death Before Dishonor XII	Next → Glory By Honor XIII

All Star Extravaganza chronology
← Previous; V	Next → VII

All Star Extravaganza VI is a professional wrestling pay-per-view event produced by Ring of Honor (ROH). It took place on September 6, 2014, at the Mattamy Athletic Center in Toronto, Ontario, Canada.

== Production ==
=== Storylines ===
Other on-screen personnel
Role:	Name:
Commentators	Kevin Kelly
Commentators	Steve Corino
Commentators	Nigel McGuinness

All Star Extravaganza VI featured eight professional wrestling matches, which involved different wrestlers from pre-existing scripted feuds, plots, and storylines that played out on ROH's television programs. Wrestlers portrayed villains or heroes as they followed a series of events that built tension and culminated in a wrestling match or series of matches.

== Results ==
No.	Results	Stipulations	Times
1^{D}	Cheeseburger defeated The Romantic Touch	Singles match	5:50
2	Mark Briscoe defeated Hanson	Singles match	8:45
3	Moose and R.D. Evans (with Veda Scott) defeated The Decade (Adam Page and B. J. Whitmer), Caprice Coleman and Takaaki Watanabe and The Monster Mafia (Ethan Gabriel Owens and Josh Alexander)	Four corner survival tag team match	9:31
4	The Addiction (Christopher Daniels and Frankie Kazarian) defeated The Decade (Jimmy Jacobs and Roderick Strong) (with Adam Page and B. J. Whitmer)	Tag team match	10:59
5	A.J. Styles defeated Adam Cole	Singles match	23:18
6	Jay Lethal (with Truth Martini) (c) defeated Cedric Alexander	Singles match for the ROH World Television Championship	15:39
7	Jay Briscoe defeated Michael Elgin (c)	Singles match for the ROH World Championship	24:01
8	reDRagon (Bobby Fish and Kyle O'Reilly) (c) defeated The Young Bucks (Matt Jackson and Nick Jackson) 2-1	2-out-of-3 falls match for the ROH World Tag Team Championship	18:20
(c) / – the champion(s) heading into the match; D / – this was a dark match
