= Ethan Page =

Canadian professional wrestler (born 1989)

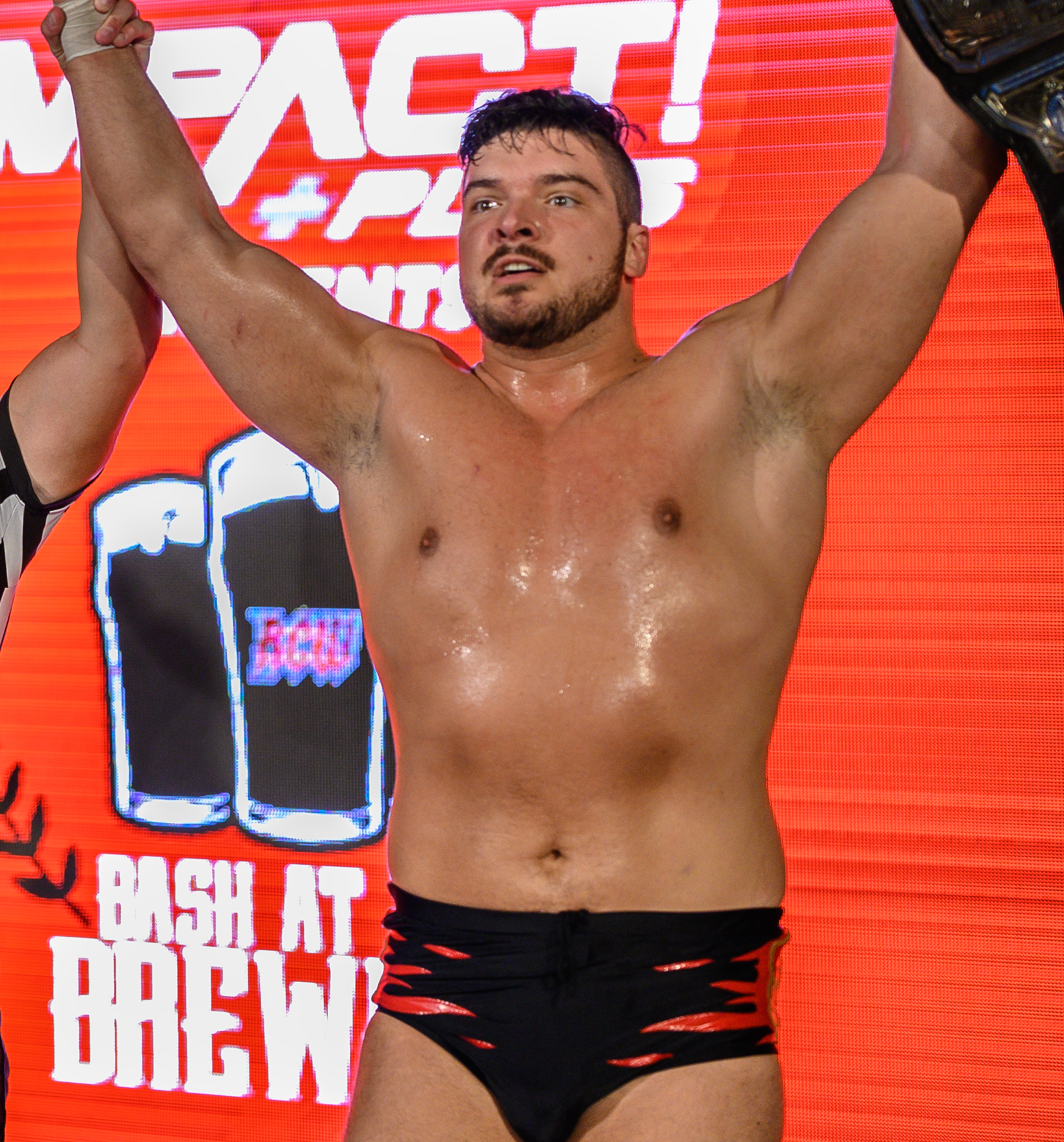
- Page in 2020

Personal information
- Born: Julian Micevski; September 20, 1989 (age 37) Stoney Creek, Ontario, Canada
- Spouse: Viviana Micevski (m. 2015)
- Children: 2

Professional wrestling career
- Ring name(s): #AllEgo; Chandler Park; Ethan Gabriel Owens "All Ego" Ethan Page; Ethan Page; Julian Logan; The Karate Man
- Billed height: 6 ft 2 in (188 cm)
- Billed weight: 240 lb (109 kg)
- Billed from: Hamilton, Ontario, Canada
- Trained by: Ernie Moore; Michael Elgin; Rip Impact
- Debut: November 12, 2006

Julian Micevski (born September 20, 1989), better known by his ring name Ethan Page, is a Canadian professional wrestler. As of May 2024, he is signed to WWE, where he performs on the Raw brand and is the current WWE Intercontinental Champion in his first reign.

Prior to joining WWE, Micevski performed on the independent circuit and also for Total Nonstop Action Wrestling (TNA), Evolve, All Elite Wrestling (AEW), and Ring of Honor (ROH). A tag team specialist, he has won multiple tag team championships in many independent promotions, mainly with Josh Alexander as The North, including winning the Impact World Tag Team Championship (now TNA) twice, with their first reign being the longest in the title's history at 380 days. He joined WWE in May 2024 and performed on their NXT brand, winning the NXT Championship a few months later; he subsequently performed for WWE's sister promotion Lucha Libre AAA Worldwide (AAA), winning the AAA World Mixed Tag Team Championship alongside Chelsea Green while also holding the NXT North American Championship, of which he is the longest reigning champion in the title's history at 273 days. He moved to the Raw brand in April 2026 and won the WWE Intercontinental Championship in November of that year.

Since 2010, he has owned and operated his own promotion called Alpha-1 Wrestling (A1).

== Professional wrestling career ==
=== Independent circuit (2006–2024) ===
Micevski began his professional wrestling training under the tutelage of Rip Impact and Ernie Moore in 2006. He has stated he did not learn much during this time, instead gaining the larger part of his early experience on the road while traveling with Michael Elgin, whom he credits as his mentor. He made his in-ring debut under the ring name Julian Logan on November 12, 2006, in a fatal four-way match at a Pure Wrestling Association (PWA) event in Brantford, Ontario, which was won by Indy Soldier. On June 13, 2008, he lost to Pelle Primeau in the first round of Chikara's Young Lions Cup. After wrestling for small local promotions in Hamilton, Page founded Alpha-1 Wrestling (A1) in 2010. He held the promotion's major titles, including the A1 Alpha Male Championship, A1 Outer Limits Championship and A1 Tag Team Championship. He also formed a tag team with Josh Alexander in September 2011, known as Monster Mafia.

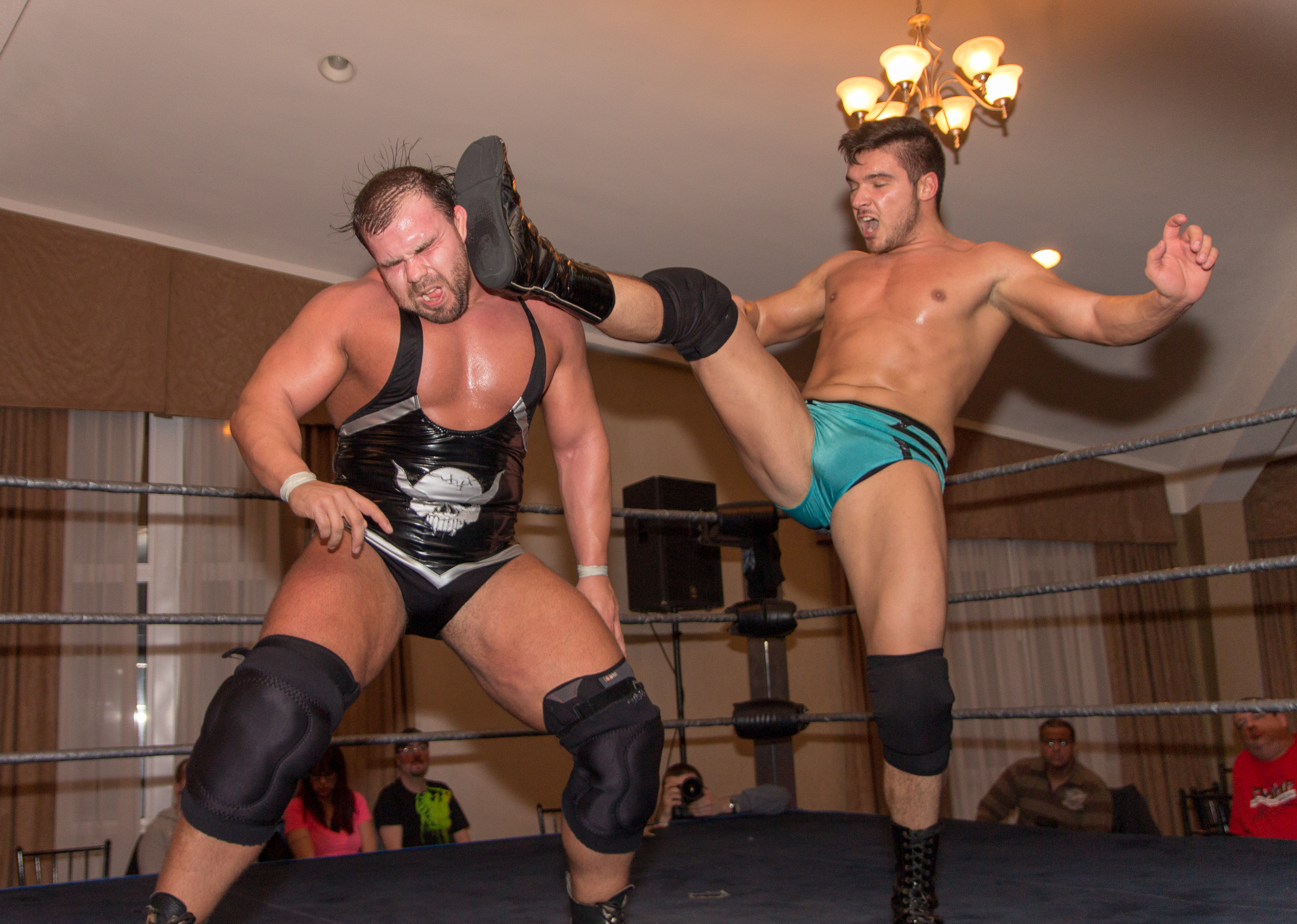
Page (right) hitting a big boot kick against Michael Elgin during a February 2013 independent show

In April 2012, Page began appearing for Absolute Intense Wrestling (AIW), where he won the AIW Absolute Championship three times between June 2013 and November 2015. Page also wrestled for All American Wrestling (AAW), where he and Elgin, as Men of the Year (MOTY), defeated Kung Fu Manchu (Louis Lyndon and Marion Fontaine) and Zero Gravity (Brett Gakiya and CJ Esparza) at One Twisted Christmas on December 30, 2013, to win the AAW Tag Team Championship. On February 23, 2014, he made a one-night appearance for Dragon Gate USA at Way of the Ronin, losing to Yosuke Santa Maria. At AAW: Vanguard on June 20, 2015, Page defeated Alexander to win the AAW Heavyweight Championship, but lost the title to Josh Prohibition on July 22, 2016, at Absolution XI. At All In on September 1, 2018, he competed in a battle royal for a ROH World Championship match later in the show, but failed to win. Page made his last AIW appearance in the "Gauntlet for the Gold" battle royal on May 24, 2024 and wrestled his last independent circuit match against Xavier Walker for Glory Pro Wrestling (GPW) the next day.

=== Ring of Honor (2009, 2013–2014) ===
Micevski wrestled three dark matches for Ring of Honor (ROH) between July 2009 and May 2013. He made his televised debut in a loss to Silas Young on the May 24, 2014 episode of Ring of Honor Wrestling under the ring name #AllEgo, which was then changed to Ethan Gabriel Owens. On the July 26 episode, Monster Mafia lost to ROH World Tag Team Champions reDRagon (Bobby Fish and Kyle O'Reilly). On Night 2 of Death Before Dishonor XII on August 23, Monster Mafia lost to The Decade (Jimmy Jacobs and Roderick Strong). Page's last match was at All Star Extravaganza VI on September 6, where Monster Mafia lost to Moose and R.D. Evans in a four corner survival tag team match also involving Caprice Coleman and Takaaki Watanabe and The Decade (Adam Page and B. J. Whitmer).

=== Evolve (2014–2017) ===
Page made his debut for Evolve at Evolve 29 on May 9, 2014, where Monster Mafia lost to the Bravado Brothers. Throughout 2015, he feuded with Johnny Gargano, who in the storyline got Page his job in Evolve, but Page was now trying to make himself a name at Gargano's expense. Page defeated Gargano at Evolve 44 on May 31 and in an Anything Goes match at Evolve 47 on August 15. Their feud culminated at Evolve 49 on October 17 in an "I Quit" match with Gargano's Evolve career on the line, which Page lost. His next feud was with Drew Galloway, whom he lost to at Evolve 60 on May 6, 2016, and in an Anything Goes match at Evolve 63 on June 11. At Evolve 67 on October 20, Page, Fred Yehi and TJP unsuccessfully challenged Galloway, Dustin and Ethan Carter III for the Evolve Tag Team Championship. He also failed to win the Evolve Championship twice, losing to Timothy Thatcher at Evolve 70 on October 15 and Zack Sabre Jr. at Evolve 84 on May 20, 2017. At Evolve 92 on September 22, Page and ACH, as the Troll Boyz, defeated the Lethal Enforcers (Anthony Henry and JD Drake) to win the Evolve Tag Team Championship. The next night, they lost the titles to Doom Patrol (Chris Dickinson and Jaka). On September 28, it was revealed that Page was no longer with Evolve.

=== Pro Wrestling Guerrilla (2015) ===
On February 27, 2015, Page debuted for Pro Wrestling Guerrilla (PWG) at From Out of Nowhere, where he and Alexander lost to The Young Bucks. On May 22, they took part in PWG's annual one-night Dynamite Duumvirate Tag Team Title Tournament (DDT4), defeating the World's Cutest Tag Team (Candice LeRae and Joey Ryan) in the first round to win the PWG World Tag Team Championship after interference from Roderick Strong. However, they were eliminated from the tournament and lost the titles to the Beaver Boys (Alex Reynolds and John Silver) in the second round. In his last appearance, he and Alexander lost to LeRae and Ryan at Mystery Vortex III on May 26.

=== Impact Wrestling (2017–2021, 2025) ===
Micevski made his Impact Wrestling debut on the November 30, 2017 episode of Impact!, portraying a character named Chandler Park, the storyline cousin of Joseph Park. On the January 4, 2018 episode of Impact!, Park defeated Jon Bolen in his first match with the company. Park was removed from TV after being attacked by Kongo Kong on the January 18 episode of Impact!, as part of Kong's feud with Joseph. Now using the Ethan Page ring name and gimmick, he returned on the October 4 episode of Impact! by interfering in a match between Rich Swann and Matt Sydal, costing Swann the match and aligning himself with Sydal, re-establishing himself as a heel. At Bound for Glory on October 14, Page and Sydal lost to Swann and Willie Mack. In early 2019, Sydal parted ways with Impact Wrestling, ending their alliance. At Impact Wrestling Homecoming on January 6, Page failed to win an Ultimate X match for the vacant Impact X Division Championship.

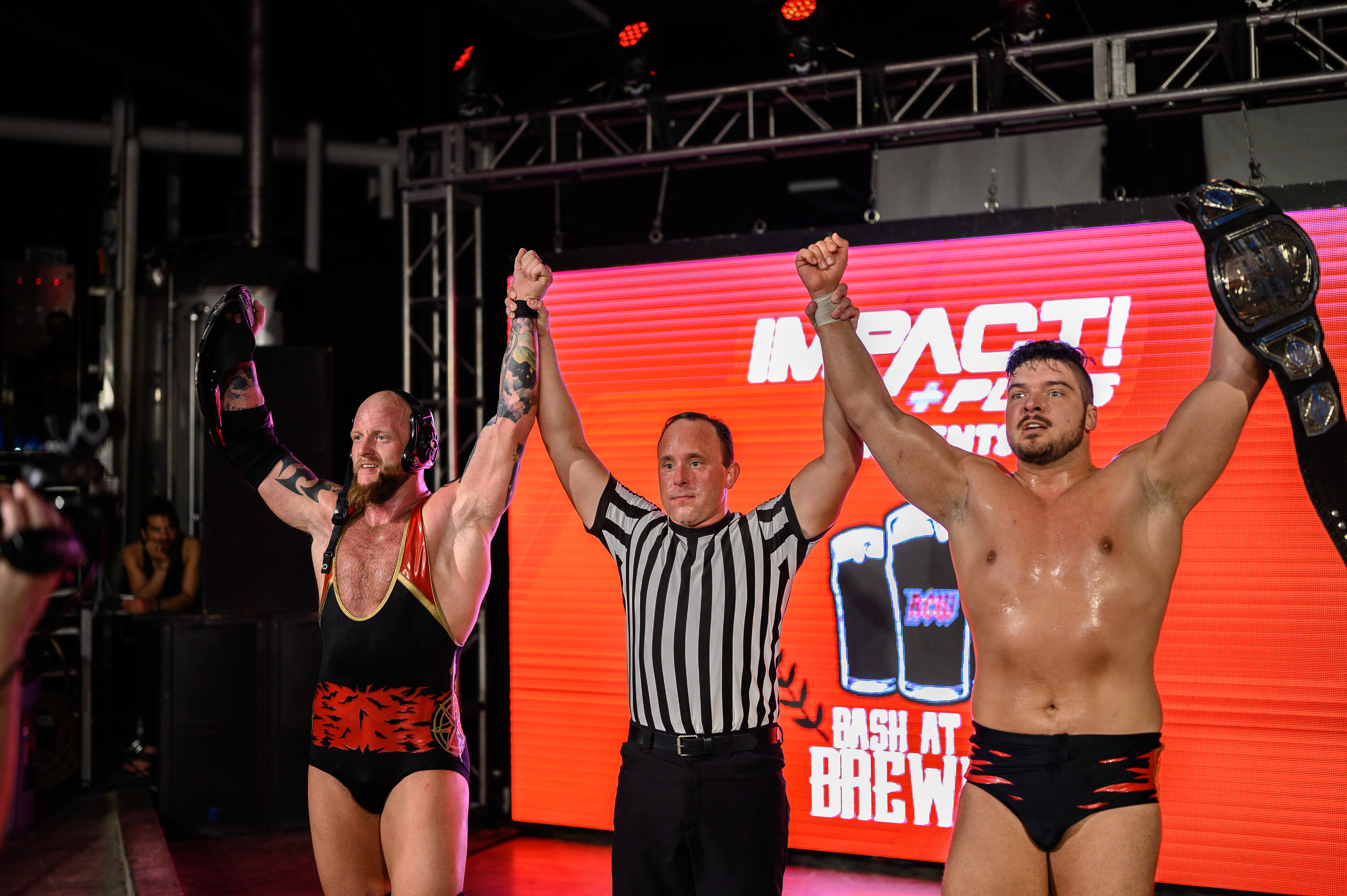
Page (right) and Josh Alexander (left) after winning the Impact World Tag Team Championship in July 2019

In April, Page reunited with the debuting Josh Alexander, his former tag team partner from the independent circuit, reforming Monster Mafia, now called The North. After a brief feud with Rob Van Dam and Sabu, The North defeated Latin American Xchange (Santana and Ortiz) on July 5 at Bash at the Brewery to win the Impact World Tag Team Championship for the first time. Two days later, at Slammiversary XVII, they successfully defended the titles against LAX and The Rascalz (Dezmond Xavier and Zachary Wentz) in a three-way match. The North lost the titles to Motor City Machine Guns (Alex Shelley and Chris Sabin) on the July 21, 2020 episode of Impact!, but regained them in a fatal four-way tag team match also involving Ace Austin and Madman Fulton and The Good Brothers (Doc Gallows and Karl Anderson) at Bound for Glory on October 24. At Turning Point on November 14, they lost the titles to the Good Brothers. At Final Resolution on December 12, Page lost to Anderson.

In preparation for his departure from Impact Wrestling at the end of his contract on January 1, 2021, a storyline began where Page had a "mental breakdown" after failing to regain the tag titles, causing the breakup of The North. This culminated in Page's final appearance at Hard to Kill on January 16, 2021, where he was "killed" by his alter-ego, The Karate Man, in a cinematic match filmed in November.

==== Return (2025) ====
On the April 3, 2025 episode of Impact!, Page made a surprise return to Total Nonstop Action Wrestling (formerly Impact Wrestling), confronting Frankie Kazarian and announcing that he had inserted himself into the TNA World Championship match between Kazarian and champion Joe Hendry at Rebellion on April 27, turning the match into a three-way, where Hendry retained the title.

=== All Elite Wrestling / Return to ROH (2021–2024) ===
On March 7, 2021, Page made his debut for All Elite Wrestling (AEW) at Revolution as the mystery entrant in the Face of the Revolution ladder match in a losing effort. Following the event, he signed a three-year contract with AEW. On the March 29 episode of Dark: Elevation, Page formed an alliance with Scorpio Sky. They feuded with Darby Allin and Sting, leading to a tag team match at Double or Nothing on May 30, which they lost. On the June 18 episode of Dynamite, Page and Sky, now going by the Men of the Year, defeated Allin in a two-on-one handicap match. On the July 14 episode of Dynamite, Page was defeated by Allin in a coffin match, ending the feud. In August, the Men of the Year aligned themselves with Dan Lambert of American Top Team. The following month, they began feuding with The Inner Circle's Chris Jericho and Jake Hager, whom they defeated on the September 24 episode of Rampage. On November 13, at Full Gear, the Men of the Year and American Top Team (Lambert, Junior dos Santos and Andrei Arlovski) lost to The Inner Circle (Jericho, Hager, Sammy Guevara, Santana and Ortiz) in a Minneapolis Street Fight, ending the feud.

Leading up to All Out on September 4, 2022, Page was recruited by Stokely Hathaway, along with Lee Moriarty, Colten Gunn, Austin Gunn and W. Morrissey. The name of his group was later revealed to be "The Firm", MJF's "faction of retainer" that would help him whenever he would need them. On the October 14 episode of Rampage, Page defeated Private Party's Isiah Kassidy; as a result, Matt Hardy and Private Party had to join The Firm. On the February 3, 2023 episode of Rampage, Page, Hardy and Kassidy unsuccessfully challenged The Elite (Kenny Omega and The Young Bucks) for the AEW World Trios Championship. On the April 12 episode of Dynamite, Page and The Firm assaulted Hardy, Kassidy and Hook until Jeff Hardy returned to make the save. At the Double or Nothing Buy In on May 28, Page and The Firm lost to The Hardys, Kassidy and Hook, after which Matt took ownership of Page's contract. On the June 30 episode of Rampage, Page turned face by attempting to prevent Q. T. Marshall and Johnny TV from further attacking Hardy; TV hit Page with a thrust kick before The Acclaimed fended them off.

On the July 1 episode of Collision, Page answered MJF's open challenge for the AEW World Championship in a losing effort. On September 9, he returned to Ring of Honor (ROH), now the sister promotion of AEW, defeating Griff Garrison. He was scouted as a potential client for Mark Sterling, but Page turned down the invitation, leading to a feud between Page and Sterling's client Tony Nese. On the December 5 episode of Collision, Page lost to Kenny Omega in what would be his final match in AEW. At Final Battle on December 15, he defeated Nese in an "I Quit" match to end their feud. In his final appearance, Page defeated Anthony Henry on the February 10 episode of Ring of Honor on Honor Club, before leaving both promotions in May. In a July 2024 interview, Page described his tenure in AEW as "chaotic and unorganized".

=== WWE (2024–present) ===
==== NXT (2024–2026) ====
Page made his surprise WWE debut on the May 28, 2024 episode of NXT by attacking NXT Champion Trick Williams and revealing himself to be the one behind the attacks of Noam Dar and Oro Mensah of Meta-Four, thus establishing himself as a heel. He officially signed with the NXT brand the following week and, as part of his contract terms, received a title match against Williams for the NXT Championship at NXT Battleground on June 9, which he lost.

On the June 18 episode of NXT, Page participated in the 25-man battle royal to earn a NXT Championship match at NXT Heatwave, but was attacked by Mensah seconds into the match, with both men exiting through the ropes. Later that night, he defeated the battle royal winner Je'Von Evans after claiming that he was never eliminated from the battle royal. With Page, Evans and Shawn Spears (who had defeated Williams in a non-title match) each having a claim to a title shot, NXT General Manager Ava scheduled a fatal four-way match for the title at NXT Heatwave on July 7, where Page inadvertently fell onto Evans after a Trick Shot by Williams and pinned him to win the NXT Championship. On the July 16 episode of NXT, Page made his first successful title defense against Dante Chen, but was attacked by Mensah after the match. At Week 2 of NXT: The Great American Bash on August 6, Page defeated Mensah to retain the title and end their feud. At NXT No Mercy on September 1, Page successfully defended his title against TNA Wrestling's Joe Hendry, with Williams as the special guest referee. At Week 1 of NXT's CW premiere on October 1, Page lost the NXT Championship to Williams (with CM Punk as the special guest referee), ending his reign at 86 days. On the October 15 episode of NXT, Page defeated Evans and Wes Lee in a triple threat number one contender's match for the NXT Championship, but failed to regain the title from Williams at NXT Halloween Havoc on October 27 in a Spin the Wheel, Make the Deal match contested as a Devil's Playground match. He competed in the Iron Survivor Challenge at NXT Deadline on December 7, which was won by Oba Femi.

Heading into 2025, Page feuded with Evans, whom he defeated at NXT Vengeance Day on February 15, but lost to in a New York City Street Fight at NXT: Roadblock on March 11. After unsuccessfully challenging Ricky Saints for the NXT North American Championship on April 19 at NXT Stand & Deliver, Page won the title in a rematch on the May 27 episode of NXT. At Worlds Collide on June 7, Page retained the title against Evans, Laredo Kid and Rey Fénix in a fatal four-way match. At NXT The Great American Bash on July 12, he successfully defended his title against Saints in a Falls Count Anywhere match. Following the event, Page introduced a custom Canadian flag themed design of the NXT North American Championship and began teaming with Chelsea Green, defeating Tavion Heights and Tyra Mae Steele at NXT Heatwave on August 24. He also feuded with Lucha Libre AAA Worldwide's (AAA) El Hijo de Dr. Wagner Jr., whom he defeated to retain the title in a Day of the Dead match on October 25 at NXT Halloween Havoc. On November 2, Page and Green defeated La Hiedra and Mr. Iguana to win the AAA World Mixed Tag Team Championship, making Page a double champion. At Guerra de Titanes ("War of the Titans") on December 2, he unsuccessfully challenged Wagner for the AAA Latin American Championship.

On the February 7, 2026 episode of AAA on Fox, Page and Green (with Green being replaced by La Hiedra due to a foot injury) lost the AAA World Mixed Tag Team Championship to Mr. Iguana and Lola Vice, ending their reign at 97 days. On the February 24 episode of NXT, Page lost the NXT North American Championship to Myles Borne, ending his reign at a record 273 days. On the April 14 episode of NXT, Page unsuccessfully challenged Tony D'Angelo for the NXT Championship in what would be his final match in NXT.

==== Raw (2026–present) ====
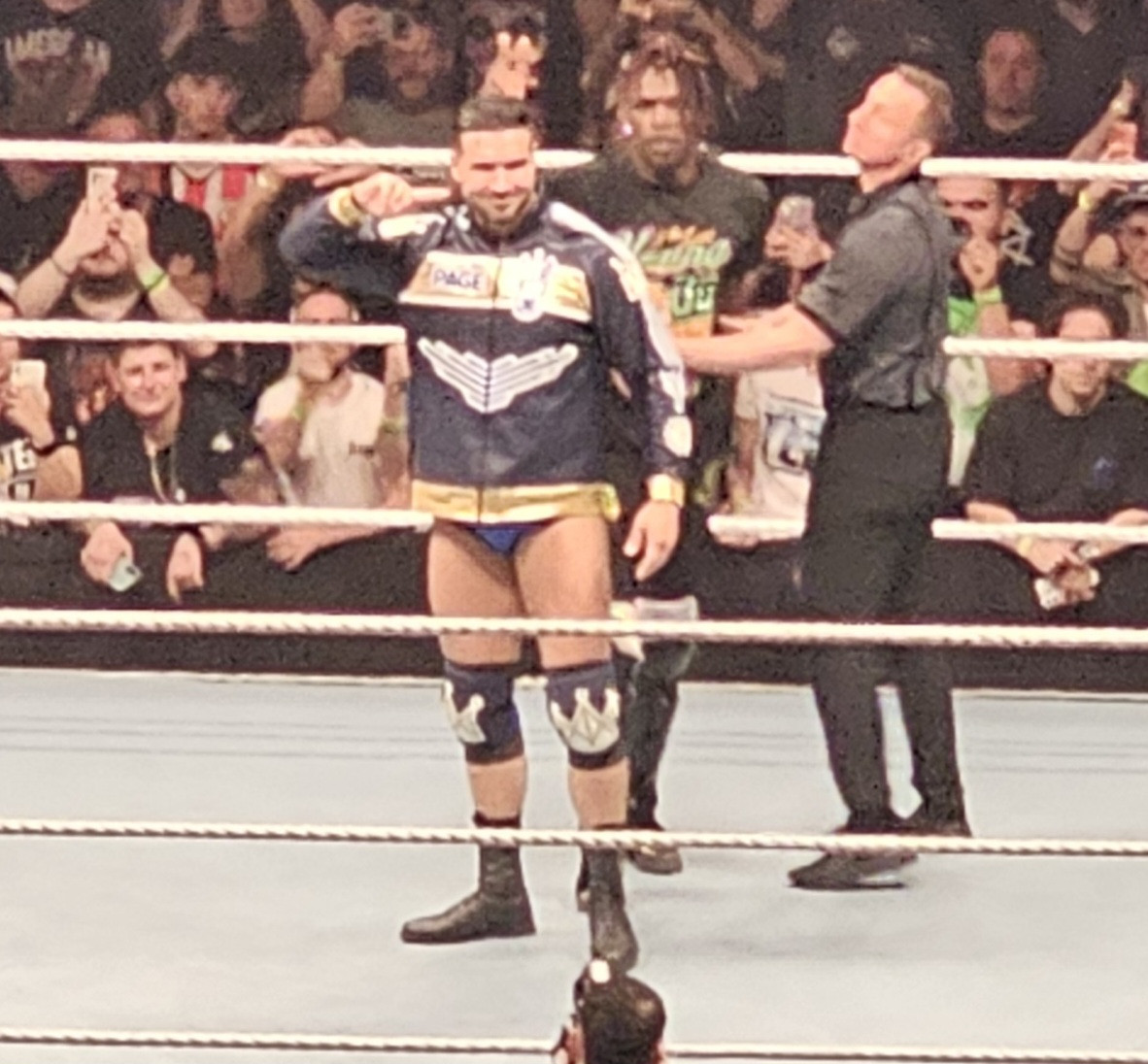
Page in June 2026

At the Raw after WrestleMania 42 on April 20, 2026, Page was announced as the newest member of the Raw brand and defeated Je'Von Evans in his debut match on the main roster with an assistance from Rusev. On the May 4 episode of Raw, Page and Rusev defeated Evans and Intercontinental Champion Penta, with Page pinning Penta. At Saturday Night's Main Event XLIV, Page failed to win the Intercontinental Championship from Penta. On the November 2 episode of Raw, Page defeated Chad Gable to win the Intercontinental Championship for the first time.

== Other media ==
An avid toy collector, Micevski often posts his toy hunt videos on his official YouTube channel. In March 2026, he was recognized by the Government of Canada for his "outstanding global impact through sport and entertainment".

=== Video games ===
Year	Title	Notes
2025	WWE 2K25	Video game debut
2026	WWE 2K26	

=== Filmography ===
Year	Title	Role	Notes
2026	Agent of Shadows	Trevor	Microdrama series; acting debut

== Personal life ==
Micevski is of Macedonian and Serbian descent. He has been married to his wife Vivana since July 4, 2015, and they have two children.

Micevski attended and graduated from Saltfleet District High School, and has worked for Redeemer University as a maintenance manager.

Micevski holds black belts in karate and taekwondo, having trained for the Olympic Games prior to becoming a professional wrestler.

== Championships and accomplishments ==
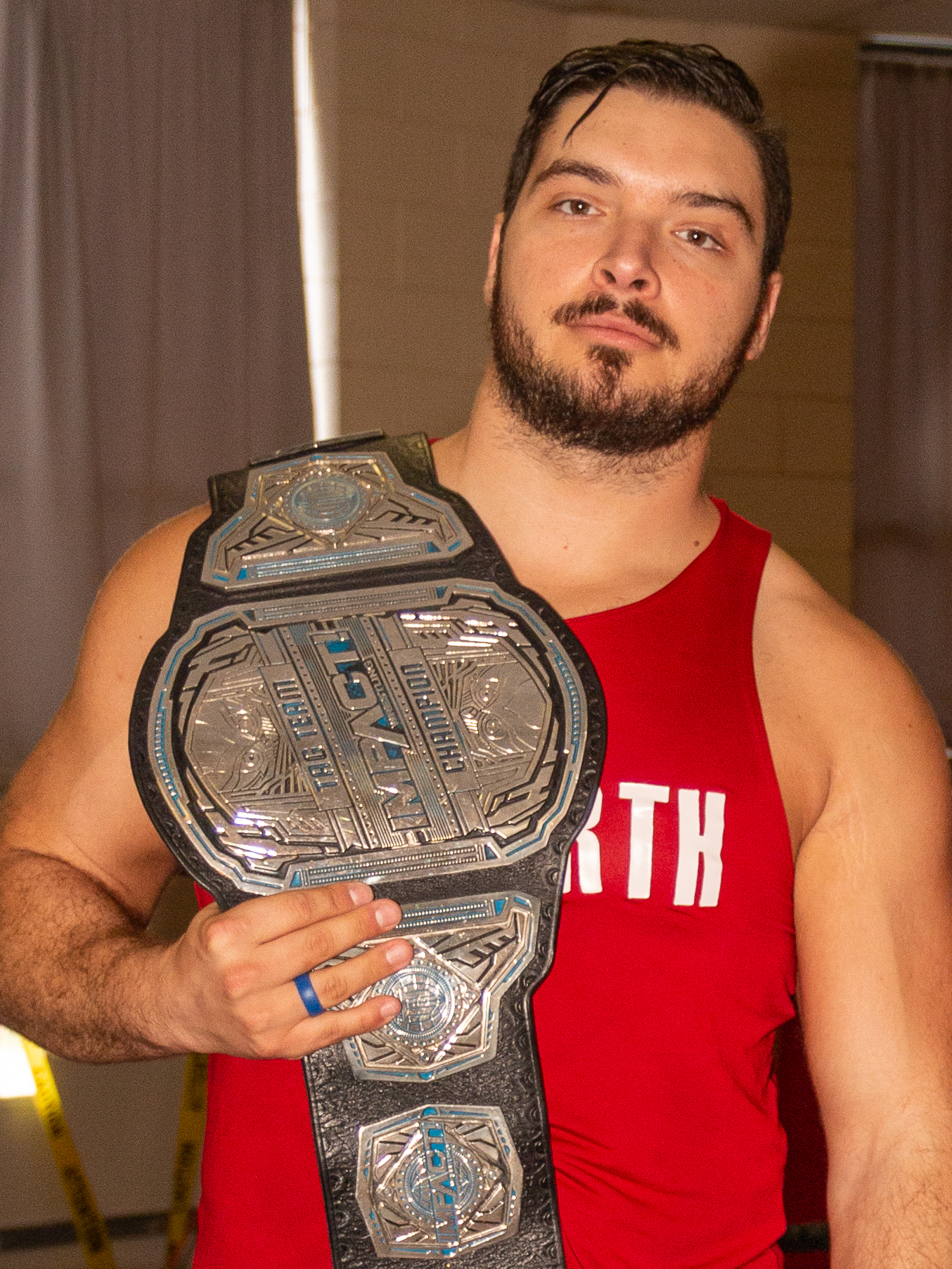
Page is a two-time Impact World Tag Team Champion.

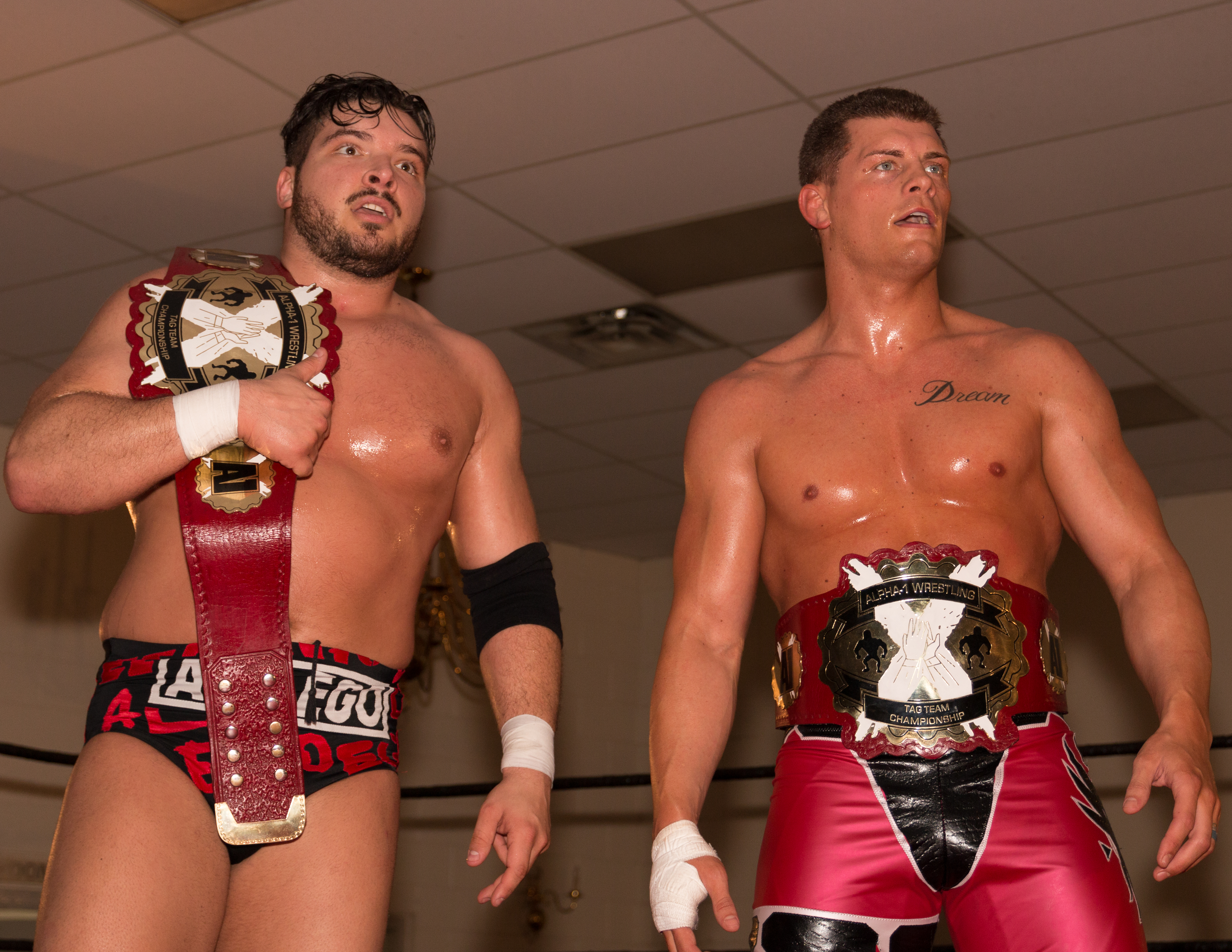
Page (left) and Cody Rhodes as Alpha-1 Tag Team Champions in 2017.

- Alpha-1 Wrestling
  - A1 Alpha Male Championship (1 time)
  - A1 Outer Limits Championship (1 time)
  - A1 Tag Team Championship (2 times) – with Cody Rhodes (1) and Josh Alexander (1)
  - A1 Outer Limits Championship Tournament (2017)
- All American Wrestling
  - AAW Heavyweight Championship (1 time)
  - AAW Tag Team Championship (1 time) – with Michael Elgin
- ACW Wisconsin
  - ACW Water City Championship (1 time)
- Absolute Intense Wrestling
  - AIW Absolute Championship (3 times)
  - JT Lightning Invitational Tournament (2013)
- Black Label Pro
  - BLP Heavyweight Championship (1 time)
  - BLP Tag Team Championship (1 time) – with Danhausen and Swoggle
- Collective League Of Adrenaline Strength And Honor
  - CLASH Championship (1 time)
- Deathproof Fight Club
  - DFC Championship (1 time)
- Evolve
  - Evolve Tag Team Championship (1 time) – with ACH
- Extreme Wrestling League Show
  - EWLS Extreme Championship (1 time)
- Fringe Pro Wrestling
  - FPW Redline Championship (1 time)
  - FPW Tag Team Championship (1 time) – with Josh Alexander
- Freelance Wrestling
  - Freelance World Championship (1 time)
- Impact Wrestling
  - Impact World Tag Team Championship (2 times) – with Josh Alexander
  - Impact Year End Awards (2 times)
    - Tag Team of the Year (2019, 2020) – with Josh Alexander
- Infinity Wrestling
  - GCW-NS Tag Team Championship (2 times) – with Joey Kings
- International Wrestling Cartel
  - IWC Tag Team Championship (1 time) – with Josh Alexander
- Insane Wrestling League
  - IWL Tag Team Championship (1 time) – with Josh Alexander
- Lucha Libre AAA Worldwide
  - AAA World Mixed Tag Team Championship (1 time) – with Chelsea Green
- Pro Wrestling Battle Arts
  - Battle Arts Openweight Championship (1 time)
- Pro Wrestling Guerrilla
  - PWG World Tag Team Championship (1 time) – with Josh Alexander
- Pro Wrestling Illustrated
  - Ranked No. 43 of the top 500 singles wrestlers in the PWI 500 in 2025
- Southside Wrestling Entertainment
  - SWE World Heavyweight Championship (1 time)
- The Wrestling Revolver
  - Revolver Tag Team Championship (1 time) – with Josh Alexander
- Union of Independent Professional Wrestlers
  - UNION Heavyweight Championship (1 time)
  - UNION Tag Team Championship (1 time) – with Joey Kings
  - King of Toronto Tournament (2013)
- WWE
  - WWE Intercontinental Championship (1 time, current)
  - NXT Championship (1 time)
  - NXT North American Championship (1 time)
- Xcite Wrestling
  - Xcite Heavyweight Championship (1 time)
  - Xcite International Championship (1 time)
