= American Top Team (professional wrestling) =

Professional wrestling stable

Stable
- Members: See below
- Name: American Top Team
- Debut: July 2, 2017
- Years active: 2017–present

American Top Team is a villainous professional wrestling stable led by Dan Lambert, and has consisted of MMA fighters such as Jorge Masvidal, Junior dos Santos, Andrei Arlovski, Paige VanZant, Austin Vanderford and Dalton Rosta. The team's gimmick is based on each member's legitimate MMA background.

American Top Team have appeared in professional wrestling promotions, including AEW, Impact Wrestling, Major League Wrestling (MLW) and Coastal Championship Wrestling (CCW), a promotion based in Coral Springs, Florida.

== History ==
=== Impact Wrestling (2017–2018) ===
American Top Team first appeared as a stable in Impact Wrestling at Slammiversary, accompanying Lashley to ring for his title unification match with Alberto El Patrón. This included founder Dan Lambert, King Mo and Jeff Monson. They returned a month later, after the promotion's rebrand to Global Force Wrestling (GFW), appearing on a vignette on the August 3 episode of Impact!. Throughout the month, Lashley was conflicted on whether he should combine his two careers together, or quit wrestling and focus on his MMA career; he would eventually side with ATT. On August 17, at Destination X, some members of ATT were ringside to support Lashley for his match against Matt Sydal. Post-match, Colby Covington attacked referee Brian Hebner with a rear-naked choke, which Lashley had to call off, before he and ATT left the arena. On the August 24 episode of Impact! (taped August 17), they were again at ringside to support Lashley in a twenty-man gauntlet match for the GFW Impact World Heavyweight Championship, which was eventually won by Eli Drake. In the gauntlet match, Lashley was eliminated by Moose, leading to a feud between the two men that would continue for the rest of the year. Moose aligned himself with Stephan Bonnar (a former mixed martial artist) and both of them stole title belts held by ATT members. On the October 19 episode of Impact! (taped August 22), after Lambert bragged about his collection of wrestling title belts, Moose and Bonnar showed up with the stolen title belts. Lashley jumped them from behind, allowing ATT to attack them and other Impact wrestlers. On the October 26 episode of Impact! (taped August 22), Moose defeated Lashley by disqualification, due to Lambert attacking him. On 5 November, at Bound for Glory, Lashley and King Mo defeated Moose and Bonnar in a six sides of steel match. Over time, Lambert started acting more like a comedic heel, which led to Lashley getting frustrated with him. On the December 7 episode of Impact! (taped November 8), Lambert and Lashley defeated Moose and James Storm, after Lashley speared Storm, allowing Lambert (as the legal man) to score the pin. The following week, Lambert challenged Storm to put his Impact career on the line in a singles match with him. Storm agreed, stating that if he won the match, Lambert and ATT would leave Impact. On the January 4, 2018 episode of Impact! (taped November 9), Lambert defeated Storm, following interference from KM, who had attempted to join ATT in the last couple of weeks. On January 25, at Genesis (taped November 10), Moose defeated Lashley, due to a distraction by KM. Afterwards, Lashley turned face and he and Moose laid out ATT, with Lambert being speared through a table.

=== Major League Wrestling (2020–2021) ===
Although King Mo had previously wrestled for Major League Wrestling (MLW) in late 2019, he would represent American Top Team the following year, with Lambert acting in a managerial role. ATT made their first appearance on the February 22, 2020 episode of Fusion (taped January 11), where King Mo squashed Dr. Dax, defeating him by submission. He also began feuding with Low Ki, who had dubbed himself the king of the knockouts. On the March 21 episode of Fusion (taped February 1), ATT got involved in a post-match brawl which saw King Mo attacking Killer Kross with a baseball bat and aligning themselves with Team Filthy. On the March 28 episode of Fusion (taped February 1), King Mo defeated Low Ki due to an umbrella shot from Tom Lawlor that the referee missed and then assuming that the towel had been thrown in. In actuality, it had been dropped by Low Ki's cornerman Ross von Erich when Team Filthy distracted him, and Lambert picked it up and threw it back in. King Mo was fined and suspended (in kayfabe) for his attack on Kross, and did not travel to Mexico for the AAA vs MLW tapings. He would continue feuding with Low Ki through promos on YouTube, dubbing him "Low IQ".

King Mo and Lambert returned to the promotion for Lawlor's Filthy Island special episode (a parody of Fight Island), for the rematch against Low Ki. On the February 17 episode of Fusion, Low Ki tapped King Mo out with a shoulder-mounted chokehold. Team Filthy claimed that King Mo was reaching for the ropes (even though there was not any there), and attacked Low Ki, before the Von Erichs rolled up in a four-wheel drive to make the save. On April 21 episode of Fusion, King Mo squashed Robert Martyr, defeating him with a side choke. Afterwards, Lambert cut a promo, complaining about the Filthy Island result, while King Mo made another threat to Low Ki, appearing to carry on the feud.

=== All Elite Wrestling (2021–2022) ===
In July 2021, American Top Team then began appearing in All Elite Wrestling (AEW). On July 7, at Road Rager, Lambert, along with Jorge Masvidal and Amanda Nunes were in the crowd. Lambert was interviewed by Tony Schiavone, in which he went on a tirade about the fans, referring to them as "marks", and expressed his disappointment in the current AEW roster, and of professional wrestling overall, until he was attacked by Lance Archer. At Fyter Fest, Lambert appeared once again, running down AEW for not being as good as wrestling was in his youth. In the following months, Lambert was joined by Junior dos Santos and Masvidal in his tirades against AEW, and they would ally themselves with the Men of the Year (Ethan Page and Scorpio Sky), continuing to deride AEW and its fans. On the September 15 episode of Dynamite, ATT, now joined by Paige VanZant, Kayla Harrison and Andrei Arlovski, were confronted by The Inner Circle's Chris Jericho and Jake Hager. Citing his own shoot fights in locker rooms over the years as well as Hager's undefeated record in Bellator MMA, Jericho challenged Men of the Year to a match, which Lambert accepted on their behalf. On the September 24 episode of Rampage, Men of the Year defeated Jericho and Hager, after ATT interfered in the match.

On the October 6 episode of Dynamite, it was announced that dos Santos would be making his professional wrestling debut in a trios match the following week. On the October 15 episode of Rampage, dos Santos and Men of the Year defeated Jericho, Hager and Sammy Guevara, after interference from VanZant and Masvidal. On the October 16 episode of Dynamite, the Inner Circle returned as a quintet for the first time in months, with Santana and Ortiz coming back. Jericho wanted a five-on-five tag team match, but Lambert told him that Men of the Year were moving on, and they have bigger plans which include championships. On the October 23 episode of Dynamite, Lambert told Guevara that ATT and Men of the Year will have the ten-man tag match, but only if he defends the AEW TNT Championship against Page. Lambert also added that if Guevara loses, he leaves the Inner Circle for good. Guevara accepted, but stated that if he wins, the Inner Circle choose who will represent ATT at Full Gear. Over the next two weeks, Guevara defeated Page, and Inner Circle chose dos Santos, Arlovski and Lambert as ATT's representatives in a Minnesota street fight. On the November 10 episode of Dynamite, the Inner Circle were jumped by Men of the Year and ATT on the entrance ramp, resulting in a beatdown. Lambert and Men of the Year cornered Jericho and took him to the ring, before Lambert performed an assisted powerbomb through a table on Jericho. Lambert then mockingly put Jericho in his own hold, the Walls of Jericho, although he was keen to stress that it is called a Boston crab, referencing Rocky Johnson. On November 13, at Full Gear, the Inner Circle defeated ATT, with Jericho hitting a frogsplash on Lambert for the pin.

On the December 8 episode of Dynamite, Ethan Page announced that Lambert would be returning to AEW. Following a confrontation with Cody Rhodes, Lambert began verbally sparring with Rhodes' wife Brandi. On the February 2, 2022 episode of Dynamite, Lambert continued to express his distaste for Brandi, resulting in VanZant coming out from the back and attacking her, potentially setting up a match between the two women. However, the storyline was scrapped due to the legitimate departure of Cody and Brandi Rhodes. Lambert also got involved in another storyline that involved Adam Page and Lance Archer, after Archer turned on Page, challenging him for the AEW World Championship. Lambert sided with Archer, and despite losing the feud, he remains aligned with him and Jake Roberts, occasionally acting as a second mouthpiece for Archer in the absence of Roberts. On the March 9 episode of Dynamite, Scorpio Sky defeated Guevara for the TNT Championship. Towards the end, Guevara's partner Tay Conti argued with Ethan Page and was blindsided by VanZant. Guevara was distracted and this allowed Sky to hit the TKO on him to win the match. Post-match, VanZant signed her AEW contract on Conti's prone body. On the May 13, 2022 episode of Rampage, Lambert and Page both interfered on Sky's behalf when he defended the TNT Championship against Frankie Kazarian.

Lambert left AEW in mid-2022, thus ending the Men of the Year team and American Top Team's association with the promotion.

== Members ==
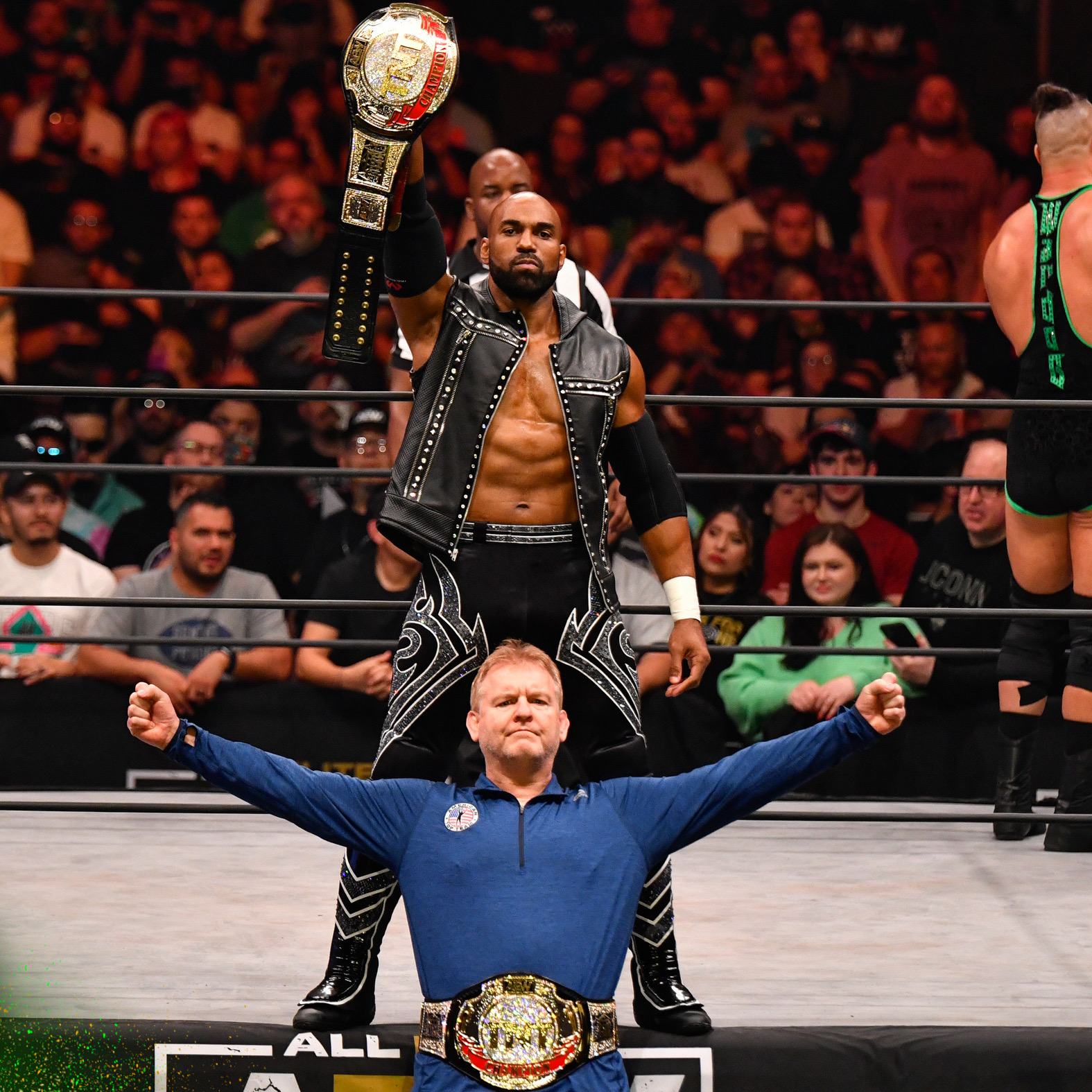
American Top Team founder Dan Lambert (bottom) with Scorpio Sky (top) during Sky's reign as AEW TNT Champion in March 2022.

Promotion	Members
Impact Wrestling (formerly Global Force Wrestling)	Dan Lambert, Andrei Arlovski, Colby Covington, Conan Silveira, Gleison Tibau, John Hartnell, KM, King Mo, Lashley
Coastal Championship Wrestling	John Hartnell, Blake Bowman
Major League Wrestling	Dan Lambert, King Mo
All Elite Wrestling	Dan Lambert; MMA: Andrei Arlovski, Austin Vanderford, Dalton Rosta, Jorge Masvidal, Junior dos Santos, and Paige VanZant; Wrestling: Ethan Page, Scorpio Sky, and Lance Archer (Note: Only a member whenever manager Jake Roberts is absent. For example, on the April 27, 2022 episode of AEW Dynamite, only Roberts would accompany Archer to ring, with members of American Top Team also not interfering on Archer's behalf.)

== Championships and accomplishments ==
- All Elite Wrestling
  - AEW TNT Championship (2 times) – Scorpio Sky
  - Face of the Revolution Ladder Match (2021) – Scorpio Sky
