= Pro Wrestling Guerrilla =

Professional wrestling promotion

- Acronym: PWG
- Founded: 2003
- Defunct: 2023
- Style: Professional wrestling Sports entertainment
- Headquarters: Los Angeles, California, U.S.
- Founders: Disco Machine; Excalibur; Scott Lost; Joey Ryan; Super Dragon; Top Gun Talwar
- Owner(s): Excalibur and Super Dragon
- Website: prowrestlingguerrilla.com

Pro Wrestling Guerrilla (PWG) was an American professional wrestling promotion based in Los Angeles, California. As of 2024, it is on an extended hiatus. It was created by pro wrestlers Disco Machine, Excalibur, Scott Lost, Joey Ryan, Super Dragon, and Top Gun Talwar. Since then, Disco, Talwar, Ryan and Lost have retired and left the company.

Debuting on July 26, 2003, PWG built a reputation for its comedic approach to professional wrestling, highlighted by unorthodox show titles like From Parts Well Known, Straight to DVD or An Inch Longer Than Average. In 2016, Dave Meltzer of the Wrestling Observer Newsletter called PWG "the best wrestling in North America".

Pro Wrestling Guerrilla commonly ran shows every month, which were then usually sold via DVD and Blu-ray. The promotion's flagship event, Battle of Los Angeles, was a tournament held annually between August and September. Co-owners Excalibur and Super Dragon were responsible for all behind-the-scenes operations. Excalibur was a graphic designer and created the website and DVD cover artworks; Super Dragon was the sole booker since 2010, along with editing shows and the YouTube highlights and previews.

== History ==
=== Founding ===
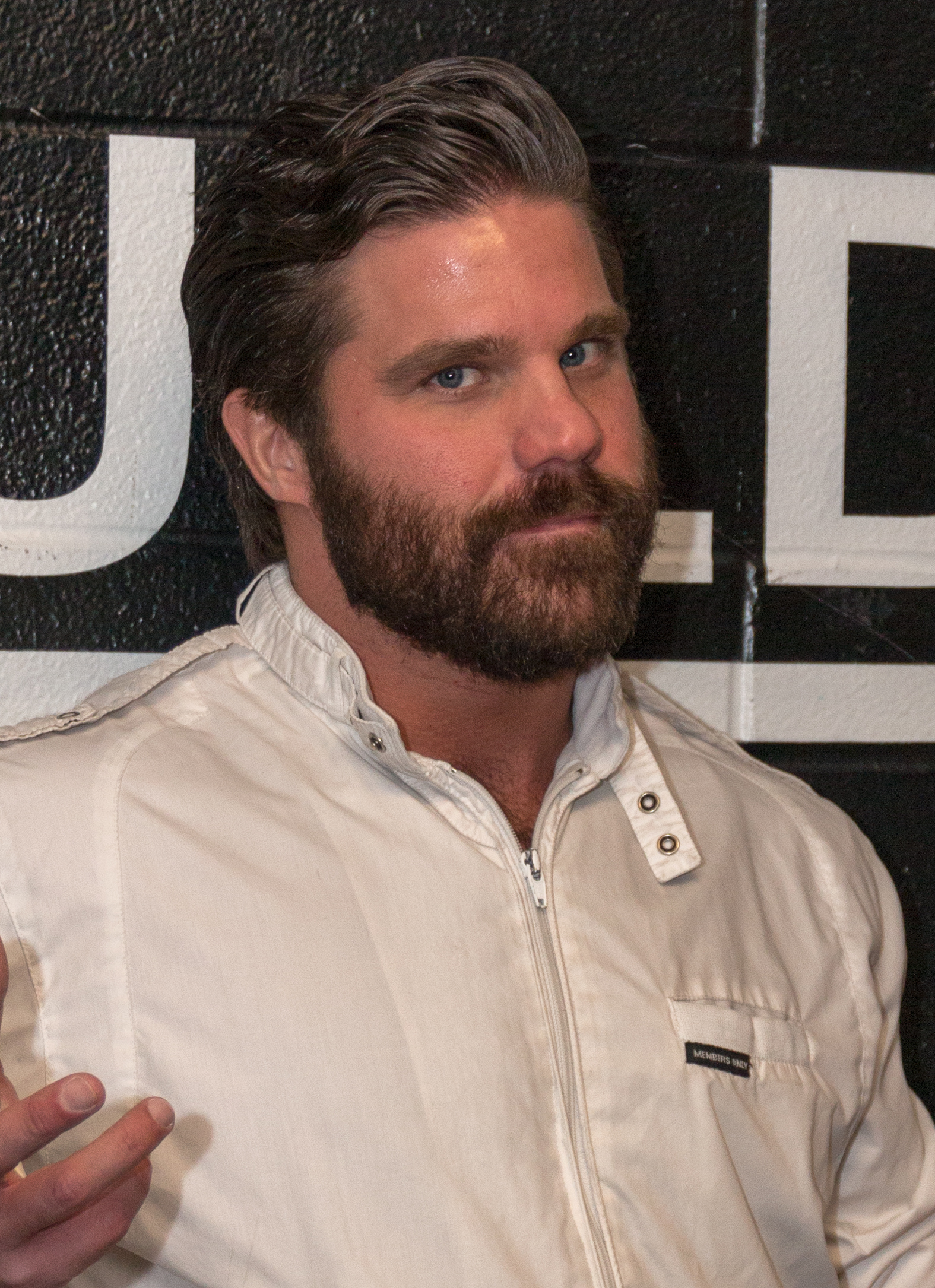
Joey Ryan

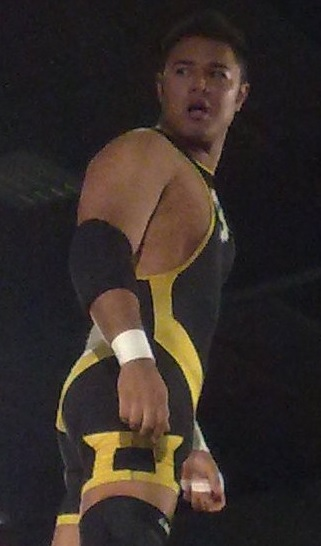
Scott Lost

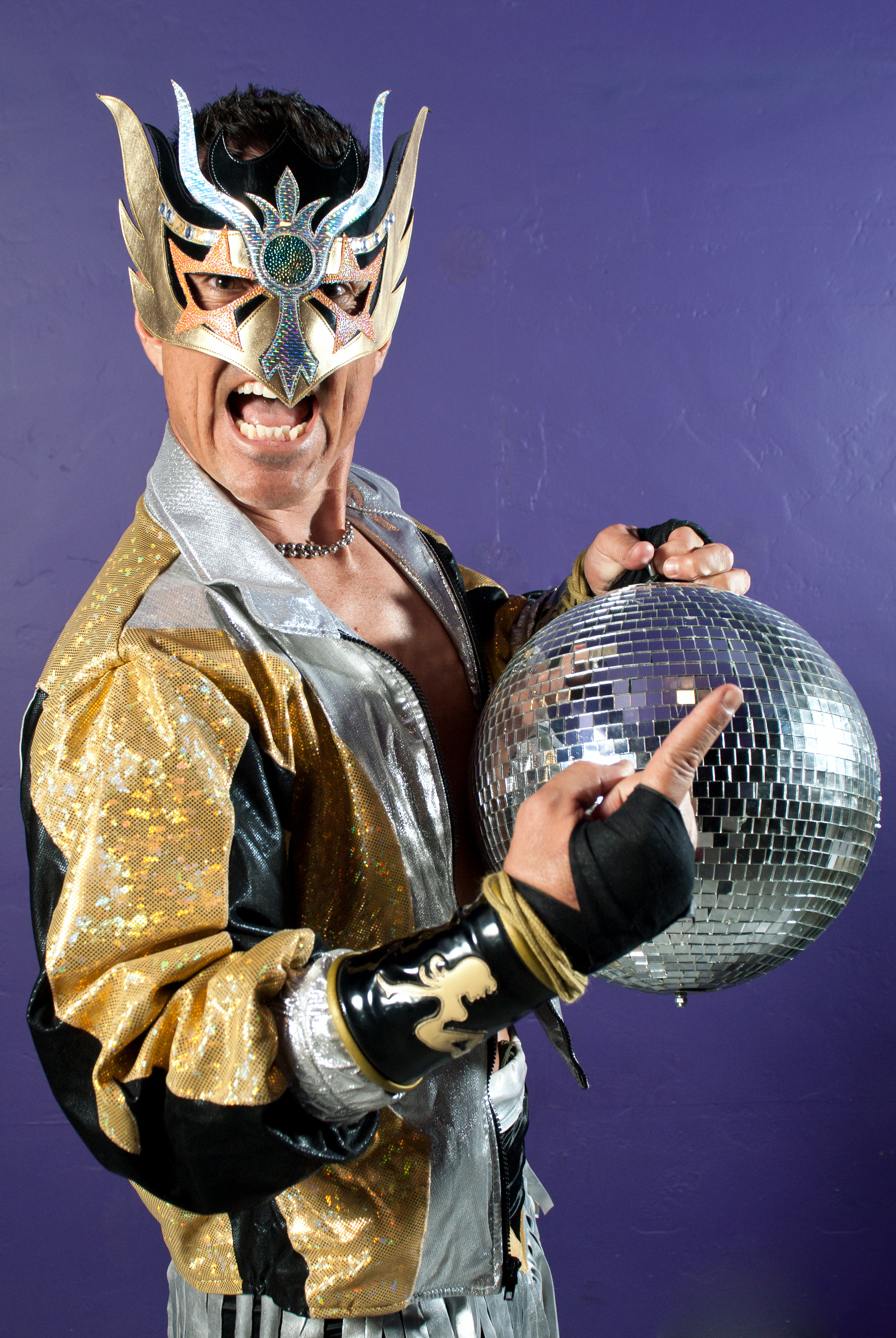
Disco Machine

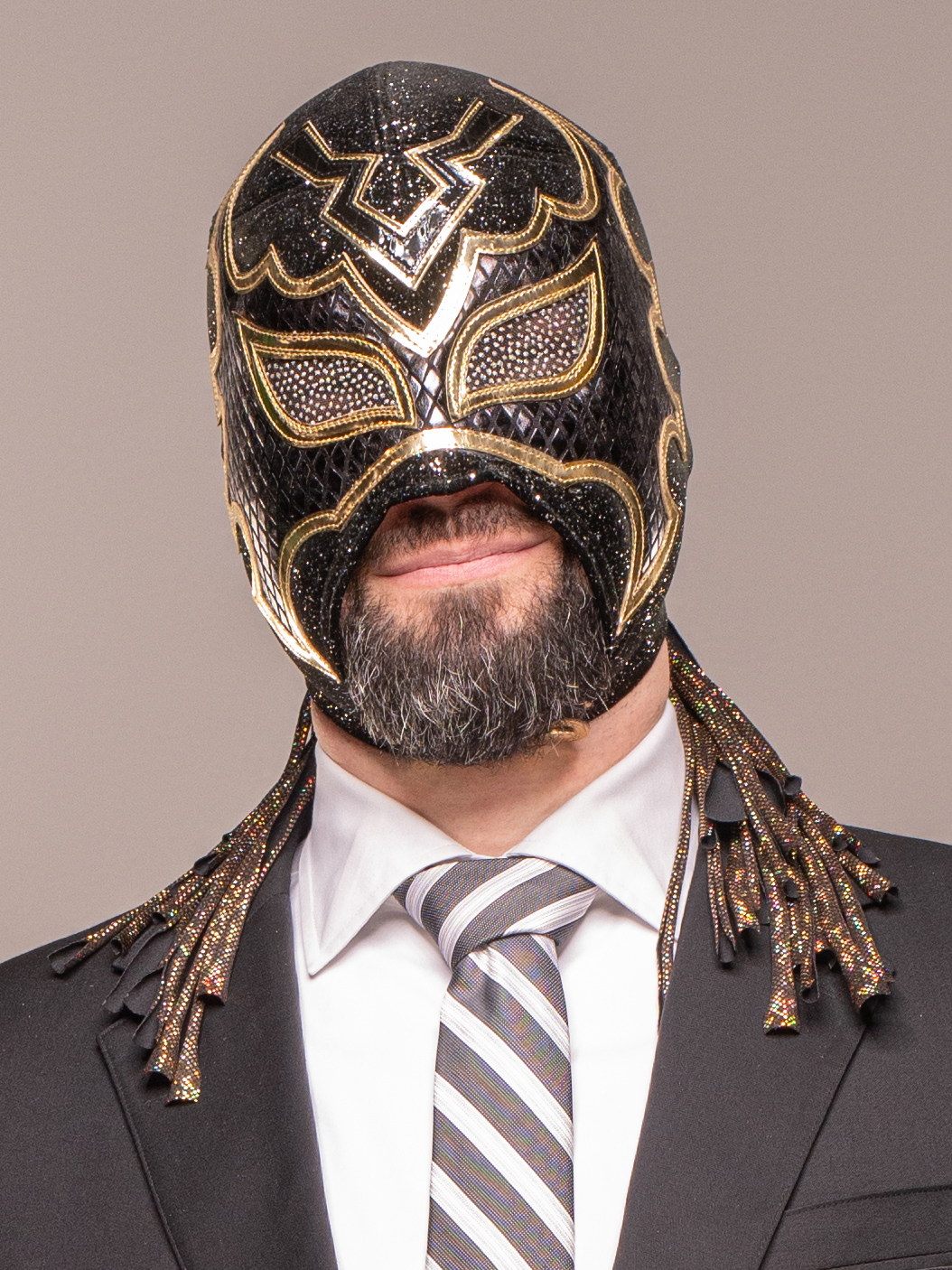
Excalibur

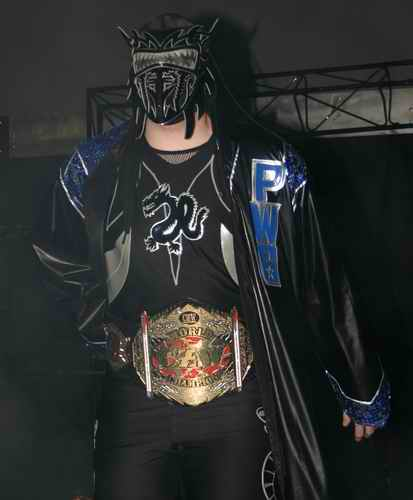
Super Dragon

A collection of local wrestlers from Southern California founded the promotion in 2003. Over time, Excalibur and Super Dragon would become the primary operators of the promotion.

In May 2003, Pro Wrestling Guerrilla announced its first show that would take place on July 26. The promotion released an online press release announcing the show's main event that would feature what would have been the first match to take place between A.J. Styles and Samoa Joe. PWG announced more matches in the weeks leading up to their debut event, featuring a mix of well known independent wrestlers and many local Southern California stars. Due to injuries and booking conflicts, the card ended up being changed several times. Samoa Joe was unable to compete in the promotion's debut show because of an injury that he had suffered in a match with Paul London at a Ring of Honor event a few weeks earlier. He ended up being replaced by Frankie Kazarian.

Despite only running six shows in its first year, PWG was voted "Promotion of the Year" in the 2003 SoCalUncensored.com Year End Awards. Along with putting local wrestlers in many of their storylines, PWG also brought in many out of town talent that weren't booked on other local shows. During its first year, PWG brought in wrestlers such as A.J. Styles, Christopher Daniels, Samoa Joe, CM Punk, Homicide, Chris Hero, Brian Kendrick, and Colt Cabana.

=== Early 2000s ===
In July 2004, PWG moved to the Hollywood/Los Feliz Jewish Community Center in Los Angeles. The first show in the new building saw A.J. Styles take on Rocky Romero, CM Punk versus Super Dragon, Samoa Joe and Ricky Reyes versus Bryan Danielson and Christopher Daniels, and a loser leaves town, steel cage match between Adam Pearce and Frankie Kazarian where Adam Pearce ended up losing the match and left PWG. After this event, PWG would run at the Hollywood/Los Feliz JCC for the next two years, and was nicknamed "The Sweatbox" by its fans due to the heat that the building would generate during warm nights. PWG's popularity continued to grow in the Southern California area, and across the world thanks to PWG distributing their own DVDs on their website, and through various reviews posted on many popular internet wrestling message boards. As PWG went on, their normal attendance numbers would begin to grow from 150–200 fans per show to 250–500 in a span of two years.

In April 2005, PWG ran its first All Star Weekend shows during the weekend of WrestleMania 21 and drew their biggest crowds at the time. PWG booked several stars such as A.J. Styles, Christopher Daniels, James Gibson, Chris Sabin, Jonny Storm, Kendo Kashin, Samoa Joe, and many other TNA and ROH stars to participate in the weekend's events. In September 2005, PWG ran the first annual Battle of Los Angeles tournament, featuring A.J. Styles, Christopher Daniels, James Gibson, Super Dragon, Kevin Steen, El Generico, and several others. Chris Bosh would end up winning the tournament by defeating A.J. Styles in the finals.

In February 2006, PWG held two shows in Europe. The first event was held in Essen, Germany. The second show was held the night after the Essen event in Kent, England. Both shows featured the majority of PWG's regular roster, along with several European wrestlers. In July 2006, PWG announced that they would be leaving the JCC due to the gym being turned into a gymnastics training center for young children. The final match in the building saw Joey Ryan defend the PWG World Championship against B-Boy in a steel cage match. PWG would go on to run in Reseda, California, for the next few months at the local American Legion post. In February 2007, PWG moved to the Van Nuys Armory, which is located a few minutes away from the Reseda venue.

=== Late 2000s ===
Bryan Danielson became a two-time PWG World Champion, vacating the title in 2009 to join WWE.

In March 2007, PWG's Commissioner of Food and Beverage Excalibur stripped Cape Fear (El Generico and Quicksilver) of the PWG World Tag Team Championship when Quicksilver was unable to compete because of a class two concussion he suffered during a match with Davey Richards and Roderick Strong. A tournament entitled the Dynamite Duumvirate Tag Team Title Tournament, or DDT4, was held on May 19 and 20 at the Burbank Armory to crown new tag team champions, with Roderick Strong and PAC emerging the victors against the Briscoe Brothers in the tournament finals.

On May 3, 2007, PWG released a statement via the PWG Message Board at PWG's official site announcing they would no longer be working with Total Nonstop Action Wrestling (TNA) after TNA presented them with a contract that would prevent contracted TNA wrestlers from appearing on DVDs sold through any third parties, including PWG's long-time partner Highspots.com. PWG stated that after looking at several solutions, including ending their contract with Highspots, releasing their DVD solely through their website, and removing all matches featuring TNA wrestlers from their home releases, they made the decision to end their relationship with TNA and thus were no longer able to book TNA wrestlers. This resulted in the loss of Frankie Kazarian, the first holder of the PWG World Championship, The Motor City Machine Guns of Alex Shelley and Chris Sabin, who were already booked to compete in the tournament for the vacated PWG World Tag Team Championship, and Samoa Joe, A.J. Styles, Low Ki, and Christopher Daniels, all of whom had been booked to appear on upcoming shows.

PWG celebrated their fourth anniversary with a show on July 29, 2007 at the Burbank Armory in Burbank. The event was scheduled to have The Briscoe Brothers on the card, but the team did not appear at the event which caused the card to be changed. The show ended up seeing Bryan Danielson defeat Necro Butcher in a Street Fight, Kevin Steen and El Generico defeat Roderick Strong and PAC for the PWG World Tag Team Championship, and Bryan Danielson defeat El Generico to become the new PWG World Champion after issuing a challenge to him that ended up leading to an impromptu match to close the show. The show drew 500 fans, which tied the record for the largest live crowd to witness a PWG event. The show also made Southern California wrestling history, as five matches from the event were ranked in the Top 5 of the SoCalUncensored.com's monthly rankings, an accomplishment no other promotion had been able to achieve.

In February 2009, PWG made some notable wrestling news when recently WWE released Colt Cabana (Scotty Goldman) made a surprise appearance at a PWG show and wrestled for the world title merely 24 hours after his release.

In September 2009, Bryan Danielson ended the longest PWG World Championship reign (at the time) in PWG history when he defeated Chris Hero. After winning, Danielson forfeited the title to sign with WWE. A new champion was crowned at the 2009 Battle of Los Angeles, won by Kenny Omega.

=== Early 2010s ===
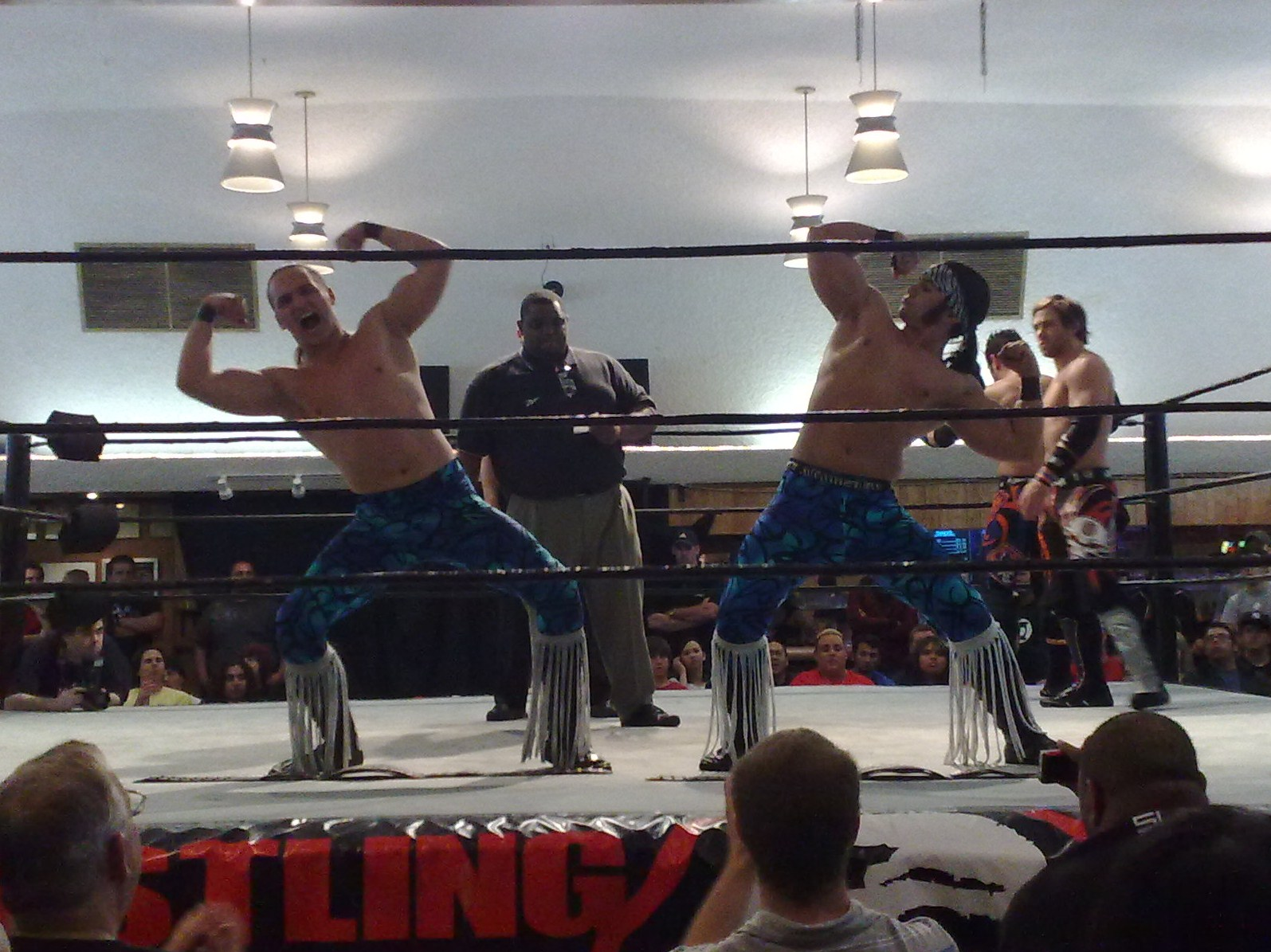
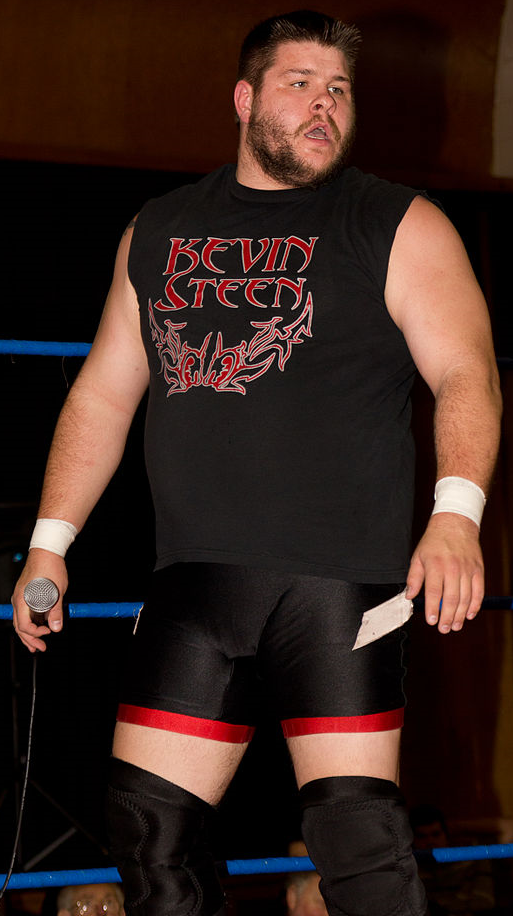
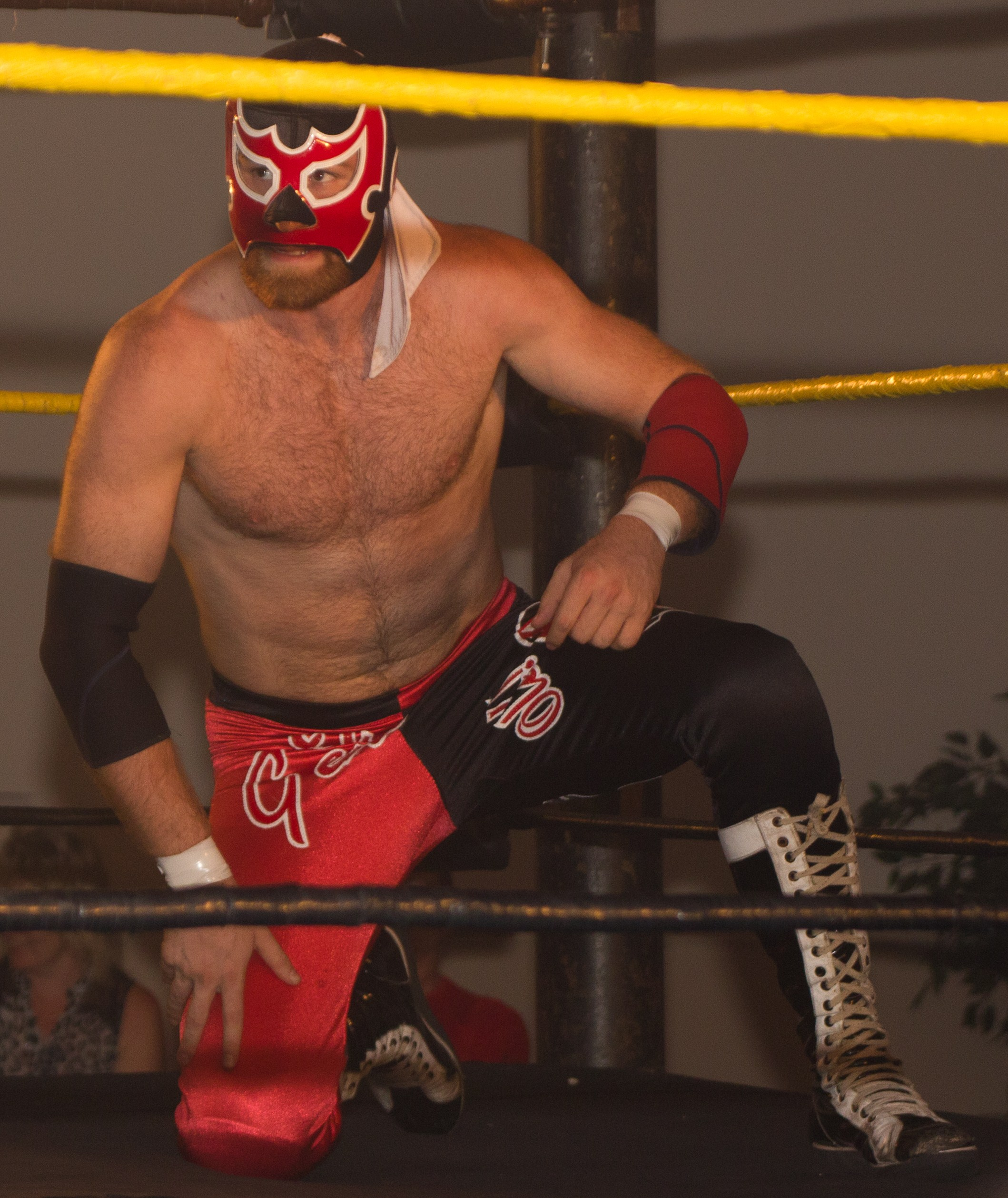
The Young Bucks, El Generico, and Kevin Steen would all be core roster members of PWG in the late 2000s/early 2010s.

On January 30, 2010, PWG held Kurt Russellreunion, as part of WrestleReunion, in front of their biggest crowd ever and featured Jushin Thunder Liger, The Great Muta, Super Crazy and Rob Van Dam in his first U.S. independent wrestling appearance plus the reunited tag team of Paul London and Brian Kendrick all in action.

On February 27, 2010 at As the Worm Turns, Kenny Omega lost the PWG World Championship to Davey Richards. Also at the event, The Young Bucks made history by tying with Richards and former partner Super Dragon for most PWG World Tag Team Championship title defenses, with twelve.

On April 10, 2010 at Titannica, The Young Bucks defeated The Briscoe Brothers to officially set the record for most successful title defenses with thirteen. Their record-setting reign ended on May 9, 2010, when ¡Peligro Abejas! (El Generico and Paul London, (literal translation: Danger Bees!)) defeated them to become the new champions.

On July 30, 2010 at PWG's seventh anniversary show, one of the company's founders, Scott Lost, wrestled his retirement match against Scorpio Sky.

On September 13, 2010, Davey Richards vacated the title after deciding he was not going to be able to defend it due to commitments to Ring of Honor and Japan. Claudio Castagnoli won the vacant title on October 9, 2010, by defeating Chris Hero, Joey Ryan and Brandon Gatson in a four-way match.

On January 29, 2011, PWG held another show during the WrestleReunion 5 weekend, which included a special "Legends battle royal" and Jake Roberts facing Sinn Bodhi in what was billed as Roberts' retirement match. On July 23, PWG held their eighth anniversary show, during which Kevin Steen defeated Claudio Castagnoli in an impromptu match to win the PWG World Championship for the second time. On October 22, 2011, one of PWG's founders, Super Dragon, made his first appearance since May 2008, saving Kevin Steen from The Young Bucks, who had just cost him the PWG World Championship in a ladder match with El Generico. On December 10, Steen and Dragon, wrestling his return match, defeated The Young Bucks for the PWG World Tag Team Championship, starting Dragon's record-breaking sixth reign with the title. Also at the event, Japanese veteran Dick Togo wrestled his final match in the United States, losing to El Generico. On December 1, 2012, Joey Ryan, having recently signed a contract with TNA, wrestled his PWG farewell match, where he was defeated by Scorpio Sky. Ryan, however, remained a part owner of PWG and eventually returned to the promotion in August 2013, following his release from TNA.

On January 12, 2013, another longtime PWG wrestler, El Generico, made his final appearance for the promotion, having recently agreed to a deal with WWE. 2013 saw a multiple talented independent wrestlers debut for the promotion, with the likes of Johnny Gargano, Jay Lethal, Samuray del Sol, Trent?, A. C. H., Anthony Nese and Tommaso Ciampa all debuting between All Star Weekend in March and Battle of Los Angeles in August. 2013 also saw several wrestlers depart PWG for WWE's developmental territory NXT. In June, Sami Callihan and Samuray del Sol, neither of whom had spent much time in PWG, wrestled their final matches for the promotion, while in December, two longtime PWG wrestlers, Davey Richards and Eddie Edwards, also made their final appearances for the promotion. Also in December, Chris Hero, who had recently been released from WWE, returned to PWG.

In August 2014, Kevin Steen, who had worked regularly for PWG since 2005, left the promotion for WWE. In an interview on WWE's official website, Steen credited PWG for getting him signed, mentioning how he was invited for a tryout after William Regal had seen one of his PWG matches.

=== Late 2010s ===
In December 2015, PWG and ROH announced a working relationship, which would allow ROH contracted wrestlers to continue working for PWG. ROH contracted wrestlers (and former PWG World champions) Adam Cole and Kyle O'Reilly made their first appearances in PWG since December 2014 at All Star Weekend 11 in December 2015.

In February 2018, a purported PayPal error caused fans to order more tickets than originally allocated for the show "Time is a Flat Circle". This meant that PWG had to run the show outside of their usual home of Reseda, CA, for the first time in over six years. The show instead took place at the Globe Theater in Los Angeles, CA.

In March 2018, PWG announced that they were leaving Reseda, CA. Although PWG officials tried to book later dates at American Legion Hall, the venue was sold and they were not allowed to book dates there past June 1. On May 25, 2018, PWG hosted their last event in Reseda titled "Bask in his Glory." (This was also the farewell event of former PWG world champion Keith Lee). Their first event of 2019 was Hand of Doom where Jeff Cobb defended the title against the departing Trevor Lee. Their next event was called Two Hundred which saw the debuts of Aussie Open, Latin American Exchange and Jonathan Gresham.

=== 2020s: Multiple hiatuses ===
PWG went on a hiatus during the COVID-19 pandemic and did not hold any events throughout 2020. PWG's first show in almost two years was Mystery Vortex 7 in 2021. The 2023 Battle of Los Angeles saw the surprise PWG debut of All Elite Wrestling star Chris Jericho.

During their main event match of WrestleMania 39 Night One, Kevin Owens and Sami Zayn both wore ring gear that featured the PWG logo, marking the first time the promotion’s logo had appeared on WWE programming. During the post-show press conference, Owens and Zayn thanked both Super Dragon and the entire PWG for helping them in their careers.

PWG was forced into a second hiatus in August 2023 when Super Dragon announced there would be no more PWG shows for the indefinite future as he needed to attend to his girlfriend, who is battling with cancer.

== Last champions ==
| Championship | Final champion(s) | Reign | Date won | Location | Notes |
|---|---|---|---|---|---|
| PWG World Championship | Daniel Garcia | 1 | May 1, 2022 | Los Angeles, California | Defeated Bandido at Delivering The Goods. |
| PWG World Tag Team Championship | The Kings Of The Black Throne (Malakai Black and Brody King) | 1 (1, 1) | September 26, 2021 | Los Angeles, California | Defeated Black Taurus and Demonic Flamita at PWG Threemendous VI for the vacant titles. |

== Tournaments ==
| Accomplishment | Latest winner(s) | Date won | Location |
|---|---|---|---|
| Battle of Los Angeles | Mike Bailey | January 8, 2023 | Los Angeles, CA |
| Dynamite Duumvirate Tag Team Title Tournament | Andrew Everett and Trevor Lee | May 22, 2015 | Reseda, Los Angeles |

== Major annual events ==
Below mentioned is a list of some major events held by PWG annually:

| Name | First held | Last held |
|---|---|---|
| All Star Weekend | 2005 | 2018 |
| Battle of Los Angeles | 2005 | 2023 |
| Anniversary Event | 2006 | 2023 |
| Dynamite Duumvirate Tag Team Title Tournament | 2007 | 2015 |
| WrestleReunion | 2010 | 2012 |
| Mystery Vortex | 2012 | 2023 |
