= DGUSA Freedom Fight =

American professional wrestling event

Freedom Fight / Open the Freedom Gate is a series of professional wrestling pay-per-view events produced by Dragon Gate USA.

== Background ==
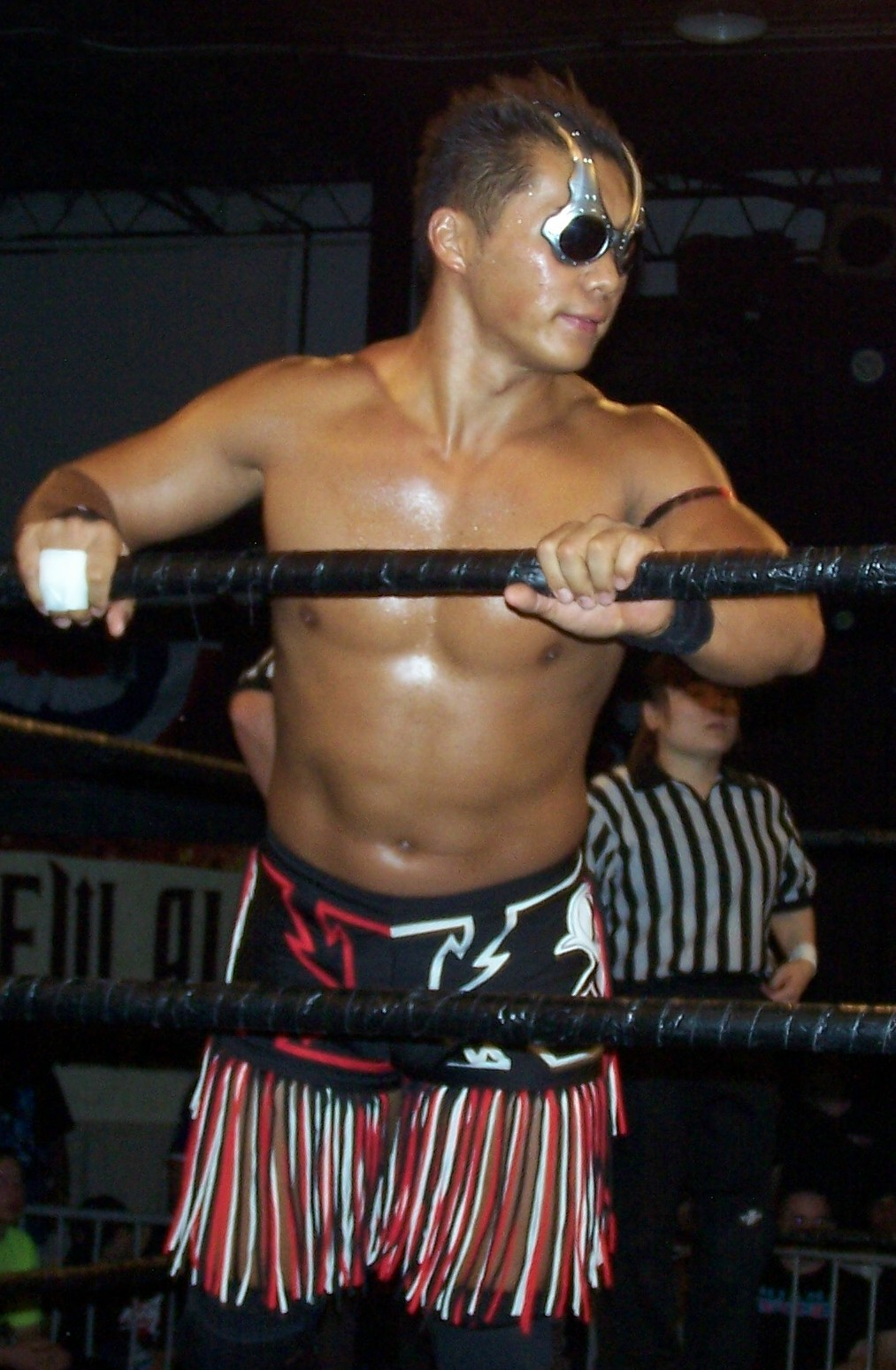
Cima will be vying for the Open the Freedom Gate Championship.

Freedom Fight will feature an undetermined number of professional wrestling matches that will involve different wrestlers from pre-existing scripted feuds and storylines. Wrestlers will be portrayed as either villains or heroes in the scripted events that build tension and culminate into a wrestling match or series of matches.

The main emphasis on this show is to inaugurate the company's title, the Open the Freedom Gate Championship. There will be a 14-man tournament featuring four qualifying matches before leading to a final, which will be contested as a four-way elimination match between the winners. The first qualifier announced was a three-way match between Mike Quackenbush, Super Crazy, and Cima in a match billed as a "salute" to the trainer of all three men, Jorge Rivera. It was later announced Rivera was added to the match, making it a four-way. Proceeding this was the announcement of two singles matches being entitled, "Next Level" and "Redemption". The former will be pitting Davey Richards against one-half of the Open the Twin Gate Champions Yamato. The other singles match was announced on November 3 to be Brian Kendrick versus BxB Hulk. There was also a six-way match announced with the first two competitors for the match being named as Nick and Matt Jackson. The final four participants were announced on November 3, giving the match a theme, "Generation New", as it highlights younger wrestlers. The names announced were: Jigsaw, Johnny Gargano, Lince Dorado, and Gran Akuma.

Following their previous two encounters at Enter the Dragon and Untouchable, Dragon Kid and Masato Yoshino have developed a rivalry to determine who is the better competitor. With Dragon Kid winning both times, a frustrated Yoshino confronted his rival at the latter show, which also drew Yoshino's tag team partner Naruki Doi (the two together are known as Speed Muscle) into the conflict, as well as Shingo Takagi coming to the aid of Dragon Kid. This prompted the company to sign a tag team match featuring both parties at this show.

== Results ==
=== 2010 ===
Freedom Fight 2010
- Promotion: Dragon Gate USA
- Date: November 28, 2009 (aired January 22, 2010)
- City: Philadelphia
- Venue: The Arena

Pay-per-view chronology
← Previous; Untouchable	Next → Fearless

Freedom Fight chronology
← Previous —	Next → Freedom Fight 2011

#	Matches	Stipulations
Dark	Kyle O'Reilly defeated Adam Cole	Singles match
Dark	Jon Moxley defeated B-Boy	Singles match
1	Gran Akuma defeated Matt Jackson, Nick Jackson, Hallowicked, Johnny Gargano and Lince Dorado	Six-way qualifying match in the Open the Freedom Gate Championship tournament
2	BxB Hulk defeated Brian Kendrick	Singles qualifying match in the Open the Freedom Gate Championship tournament
3	CIMA defeated Mike Quackenbush, Super Crazy, and Jorge Rivera	Four-way qualifying match in the Open the Freedom Gate Championship tournament
4	YAMATO defeated Davey Richards	Singles qualifying match in the Open the Freedom Gate Championship tournament
5	Jigsaw defeated Eddie Kingston	Singles match
6	Speed Muscle (Masato Yoshino and Naruki Doi) defeated Shingo and Dragon Kid	Tag team match
7	BxB Hulk defeated Gran Akuma, CIMA and YAMATO	Elimination match tournament final for the Open the Freedom Gate Championship

=== 2011 ===
Freedom Fight 2011
- Promotion: Dragon Gate USA
- Date: October 30, 2010 (aired January 7, 2011)
- City: Rahway, New Jersey
- Venue: Rahway Rec Center
- Attendance: 792

Pay-per-view chronology
← Previous; Bushido: Code of the Warrior	Next → United: NYC

Freedom Fight chronology
← Previous; Freedom Fight 2010	Next → —

#	Matches	Stipulations
Dark	[Rip Impact] defeated [Derek Ryze]	Singles match
Dark	Sami Callihan defeated Caleb Konley, Cheech, Amasis, Ophidian, and Silas Young	Gauntlet match
1	Jimmy Jacobs defeated Arik Cannon	Singles match
2	Brodie Lee defeated Akebono	Singles match
3	BxB Hulk & Homicide defeated Akira Tozawa & Jon Moxley	Tag team match
4	CIMA defeated SHINGO	Singles match
5	Sami Callihan defeated James Small	Singles match
6	Chuck Taylor & Johnny Gargano & Rich Swann defeated Genki Horiguchi & Austin Aries & Ricochet	Six-man Tag team match
7	Masato Yoshino defeated Yamato	Singles match
