= Battle of Los Angeles (2013) =

2013 professional wrestling tournament by PWG

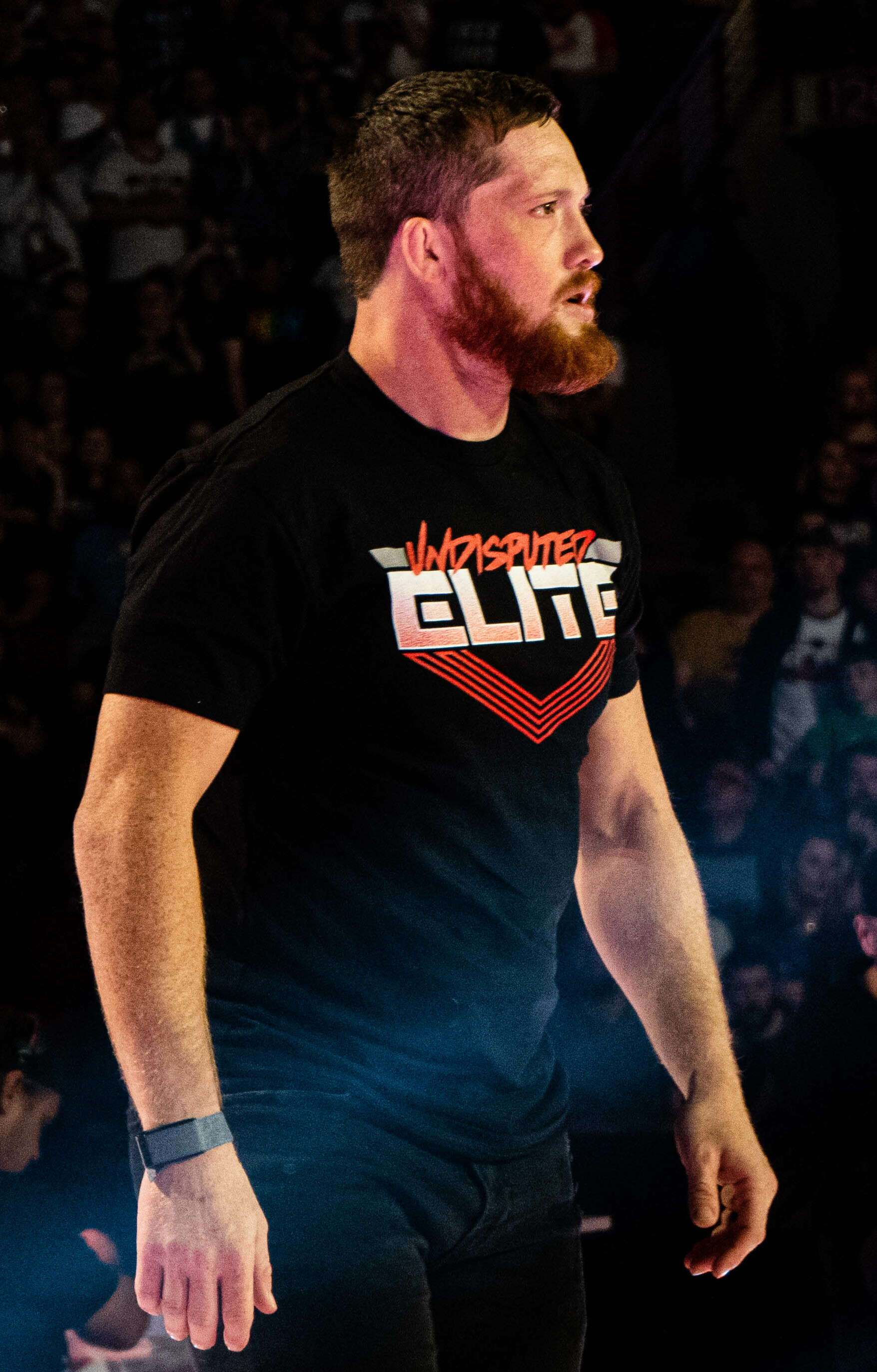
- The 2013 tournament winner Kyle O'Reilly
- Promotion: Pro Wrestling Guerrilla
- Date: Night One: August 30, 2013; Night Two: August 31, 2013
- City: Reseda, Los Angeles, California
- Venue: American Legion Post #308

Event chronology
← Previous; Ten	Next → Matt Rushmore

Battle of Los Angeles chronology
← Previous; 2012	Next → 2014

Battle of Los Angeles (2013) was the ninth Battle of Los Angeles professional wrestling tournament produced by Pro Wrestling Guerrilla (PWG). It was a two-night event which took place on August 30 and August 31, 2013, at the American Legion Post #308 in Reseda, Los Angeles, California.

It was a sixteen-man tournament, which concluded with Kyle O'Reilly defeating Michael Elgin in the tournament final. Aside from the tournament, non-tournament matches took place on both nights. The night one was headlined by a six-man tag team match, in which Adam Cole and The Young Bucks (Matt Jackson and Nick Jackson) defeated Forever Hooligans (Alex Koslov and Rocky Romero) and T.J. Perkins. On the second night, two six-man tag team matches place. In one match, the team of Chuck Taylor, Joey Ryan and Trent? defeated the team of B-Boy, Tommaso Ciampa and Willie Mack. The second was an intergender match, in which Adam Cole and The Young Bucks defeated AR Fox, Candice LeRae and Rich Swann.

== Background ==
In July 2013, PWG announced the lineup of the Battle of Los Angeles tournament with ACH, Michael Elgin and Trent? announced as the first three participants. Davey Richards was originally announced for the tournament, but later pulled out.

== Event ==
=== Night One ===
The 2013 Battle of Los Angeles kicked off with a match between Chuck Taylor and Kevin Steen. Steen delivered a pop-up powerbomb and a package piledriver to Taylor for the win.

Next, Brian Cage took on Tommaso Ciampa. Cage delivered three discus lariats to Ciampa for the win.

Next, Johnny Gargano took on Willie Mack. Gargano made Mack submit to the Garga-No-Escape for the win.

Next, Roderick Strong took on AR Fox. Strong delivered an End of Heartache to Fox for the win.

Next, Joey Ryan took on Drake Younger. Younger delivered a Drake's Landing to Ryan for the win.

Next, ACH took on Anthony Nese. ACH delivered a Big Bang Attack to Nese for the win.

Next, Trent? took on Kyle O'Reilly. O'Reilly made Trent? submit to the ARM-ageddon for the win.

It was followed by a match between Michael Elgin and Rich Swann. Elgin countered a handspring attempt by Swann into a lariat and followed it with a turnbuckle powerbomb and an Elgin Bomb for the win.

Next was the main event of the night one, a six-man tag team match, in which Forever Hooligans (Alex Koslov and Rocky Romero) and T.J. Perkins took on Adam Cole and The Young Bucks (Matt Jackson and Nick Jackson). Bucks delivered an Early-Onset Alzheimer's to Perkins, allowing Cole to deliver a Florida Keys to Perkins for the win.

=== Night Two ===
Quarterfinals

The quarterfinal round of the tournament began with a match between Brian Cage and Drake Younger. Younger dove onto Cage from the top rope but Cage caught him in a vertical suplex position. Younger countered it into a small package and pinned Cage for the win.

Next, Kevin Steen took on Johnny Gargano. Gargano countered a package piledriver attempt by Steen and applied a Garga-No-Escape on Steen to make him submit to the hold for the win.

Next, Roderick Strong took on Michael Elgin. Elgin made Strong submit to the crossface for the win.

Next, Kyle O'Reilly took on ACH. O'Reilly countered a Dragon Fly attempt by ACH and countered it into a triangle choke and an ARM-ageddon combination on ACH and made him submit to the hold for the win.

It was followed by a six-man tag team match, in which B-Boy, Tommaso Ciampa and Willie Mack took on Joey Ryan, Chuck Taylor and Trent?. B-Boy substituted for the injured Anthony Nese. Brian Cage interfered in the match and delivered a powerbomb to Ciampa onto the chairs set up on the floor outside the ring. It allowed Taylor to gain advantage as he delivered an Awful Waffle to B-Boy for the win.

Semifinals

The first semifinal match took place between Michael Elgin and Johnny Gargano. Elgin delivered an Elgin Bomb to Gargano from the top rope for the win.

Next, Kyle O'Reilly took on Drake Younger. Younger got a near-fall after hitting a Drake's Landing on O'Reilly. O'Reilly followed by hitting a tornado DDT to Younger and applied a guillotine choke on Younger to make him pass out to the hold and win the match.

It was followed by a six-man tag team match, in which Adam Cole and The Young Bucks took on AR Fox, Candice LeRae and Rich Swann. Cole knocked out Fox by countering a Lo Mein Pain into a German suplex and delivered a Panama Sunrise to Swann, leaving LeRae alone. Bucks delivered an Early-Onset Alzheimer's to LeRae, allowing Cole to follow it up by hitting a Florida Keys for the win.

Final

The Battle of Los Angeles tournament final took place between Michael Elgin and Kyle O'Reilly. O'Reilly applied a triangle choke on Elgin but Elgin countered it by delivering an Elgin Bomb to O'Reilly. However, O'Reilly held onto the hold and made Elgin tap out to win the tournament. Adam Cole congratulated O'Reilly on winning after the match but insulted him by calling him "the second-best member of Future Shock" leading to O'Reilly attacking him. The Young Bucks rushed to attack O'Reilly but Candice LeRae made the save. Bucks attacked her until Joey Ryan delivered a That 70's Kick to Cole saying that only he had the rights to hit LeRae. Bucks delivered an Early-Onset Alzheimer's to Ryan. Kevin Steen and Rick Knox rushed in to make the save but Steen turned on Knox by hitting a package piledriver and then delivered a package piledriver to LeRae and broke the Battle of Los Angeles trophy.

== Reception ==
Jake St-Pierre praised the tournament. He rated the night one 7.7, calling it PWG's "second-worst show of the year" in comparison to other shows which featured more acclaimed performances and would have been equivalent to Ring of Honor's "Show of the Year candidate". According to him, it "was a fantastic show full of consistent wrestling and entertainment". He criticized the placement of the six-man tag team match as the main event, believing it was "a before-intermission spotfest more so than an actual main event."

He considered the night two to be virtually perfect, rating it a full 10 score. He stated that the tournament's night two was PWG's "one of the very best shows" ever, with "the perfect blend of comedy, brawling, insane spotfests, and storyline".

== Aftermath ==
Kevin Steen's shocking alliance with Adam Cole and The Young Bucks led to the formation of a new faction called Mount Rushmore of Wrestling.

After winning the 2013 Battle of Los Angeles, Kyle O'Reilly received his title shot for the PWG World Championship against Adam Cole at Matt Rushmore, which he failed to win after interference by Cole's Mount Rushmore teammates Kevin Steen and The Young Bucks. O'Reilly received another title shot against Cole in a Knockout and Submission Only match at Sold Our Soul For Rock 'n Roll, where he finally defeated Cole to win the PWG World Championship.

The Young Bucks' assault on Candice LeRae and Joey Ryan led to the latter duo forming a tag team and challenging the Bucks for the World Tag Team Championship at Matt Rushmore, which they failed to win. LeRae and Ryan continued to feud with the Mount Rushmore as they teamed with Drake Younger to defeat Kevin Steen and the Bucks in a six-person tag team match at All Star Weekend 10, but lost to Cole Steen Cole (Adam Cole and Kevin Steen) in the 2014 Dynamite Duumvirate Tag Team Title Tournament. They named their team called "The World's Cutest Tag Team" and defeated the Bucks in a Guerrilla Warfare at Eleven.

== Results ==
Night 1 (August 30)
No.	Results	Stipulations	Times
1	Kevin Steen defeated Chuck Taylor	Singles match in the first round of Battle of Los Angeles tournament	16:52
2	Brian Cage defeated Tommaso Ciampa	Singles match in the first round of Battle of Los Angeles tournament	12:39
3	Johnny Gargano defeated Willie Mack	Singles match in the first round of Battle of Los Angeles tournament	15:23
4	Roderick Strong defeated AR Fox	Singles match in the first round of Battle of Los Angeles tournament	17:54
5	Drake Younger defeated Joey Ryan	Singles match in the first round of Battle of Los Angeles tournament	9:55
6	ACH defeated Anthony Nese	Singles match in the first round of Battle of Los Angeles tournament	19:00
7	Kyle O'Reilly defeated Trent?	Singles match in the first round of Battle of Los Angeles tournament	23:04
8	Michael Elgin defeated Rich Swann	Singles match in the first round of Battle of Los Angeles tournament	14:36
9	Adam Cole and The Young Bucks (Matt Jackson and Nick Jackson) defeated Forever Hooligans (Alex Koslov and Rocky Romero) and T.J. Perkins	Six-man tag team match	19:51

Night 2 (August 31)
No.	Results	Stipulations	Times
1	Drake Younger defeated Brian Cage	Singles match in the quarter-final round of Battle of Los Angeles tournament	6:50
2	Johnny Gargano defeated Kevin Steen	Singles match in the quarter-final round of Battle of Los Angeles tournament	17:08
3	Michael Elgin defeated Roderick Strong	Singles match in the quarter-final round of Battle of Los Angeles tournament	17:31
4	Kyle O'Reilly defeated ACH	Singles match in the quarter-final round of Battle of Los Angeles tournament	22:37
5	Chuck Taylor, Joey Ryan and Trent? defeated B-Boy, Tommaso Ciampa and Willie Mack	Six-man tag team match	17:36
6	Michael Elgin defeated Johnny Gargano	Singles match in the semi-final round of Battle of Los Angeles tournament	20:07
7	Kyle O'Reilly defeated Drake Younger	Singles match in the semi-final round of Battle of Los Angeles tournament	14:19
8	Adam Cole and The Young Bucks (Matt Jackson and Nick Jackson) defeated AR Fox, Candice LeRae and Rich Swann	Intergender six-person tag team match	20:44
9	Kyle O'Reilly defeated Michael Elgin	Singles match in the final of Battle of Los Angeles tournament	14:56

=== Tournament brackets ===
Battle of Los Angeles (2013)
Tournament information
- Sport: Professional wrestling
- Location: Reseda, Los Angeles, California
- Dates: August 30, 2013–August 31, 2013
- Tournament format: Single elimination tournament
- Participants: 16

Final positions
- Champion: Kyle O'Reilly
- Runner-up: Michael Elgin

First round
Michael Elgin	Pin
Rich Swann	14:36
A. R. Fox	Pin
Roderick Strong	17:54
Kevin Steen	Pin
Chuck Taylor	16:52
Johnny Gargano	Sub
Willie Mack	15:23
Kyle O'Reilly	Sub
Trent?	23:04
A. C. H.	Pin
Anthony Nese	19:00
Joey Ryan	Pin
Drake Younger	9:55
Brian Cage	Pin
Tommaso Ciampa	12:39

Second round
Michael Elgin	Pin
Roderick Strong	17:31
Kevin Steen	Sub
Johnny Gargano	17:08
Kyle O'Reilly	Sub
ACH	22:37
Drake Younger	Pin
Brian Cage	6:50

Semifinals
Michael Elgin	Pin
Johnny Gargano	20:07
Kyle O'Reilly	Sub
Drake Younger	14:19

Finals
Michael Elgin	Sub
Kyle O'Reilly	14:56
