= Kyle O'Reilly =

Canadian professional wrestler (born 1987)

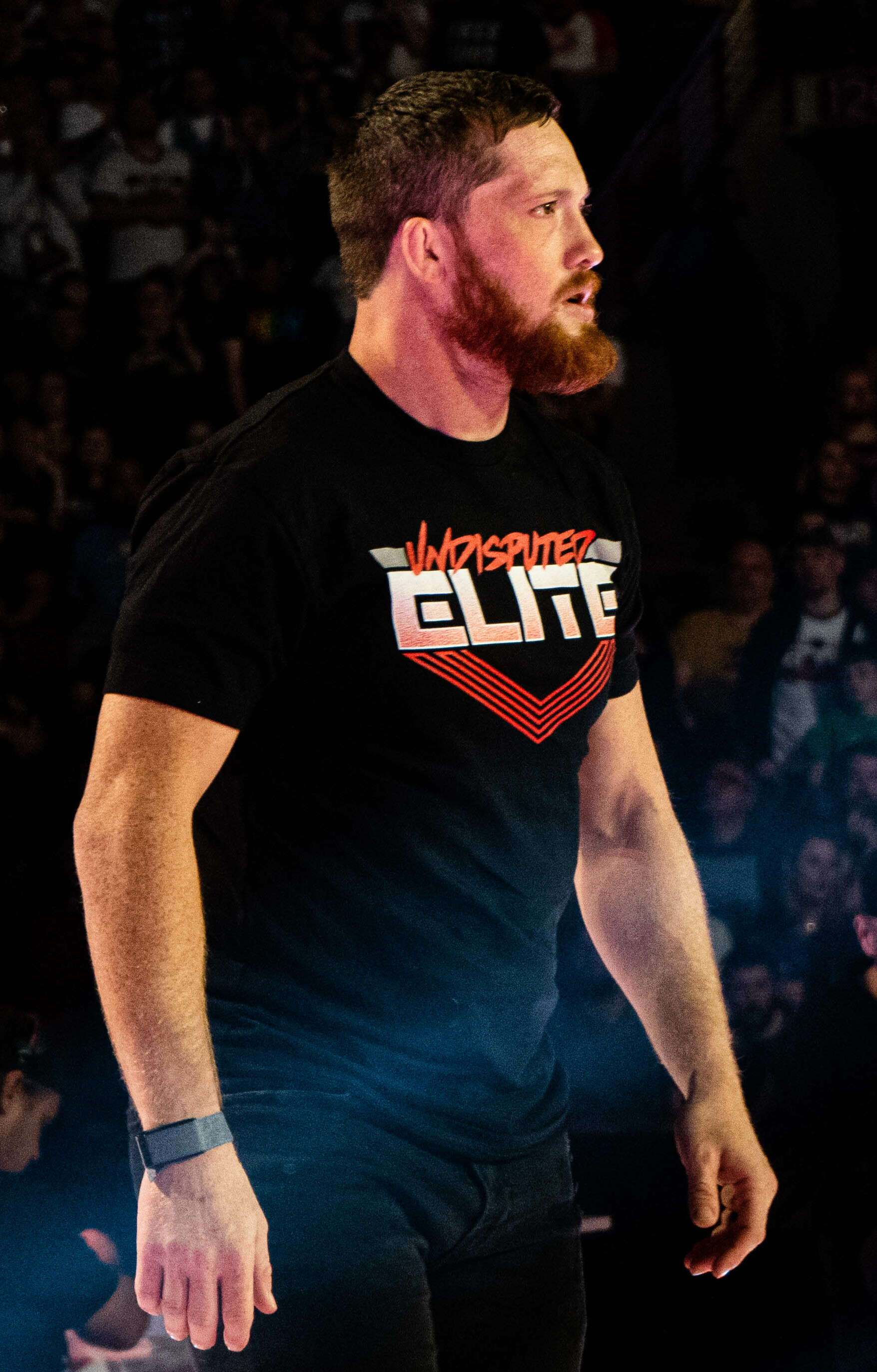
- O'Reilly in 2022

Personal information
- Born: Kyle Richard Thomas Greenwood; March 1, 1987 (age 39) Delta, British Columbia, Canada
- Children: 1

Professional wrestling career
- Ring name: Kyle O'Reilly
- Billed height: 6 ft 0 in (183 cm)
- Billed weight: 206 lb (93 kg)
- Billed from: Vancouver, British Columbia, Canada
- Trained by: Aaron Idol; Scotty Mac; Davey Richards; Tony Kozina
- Debut: 2005

Kyle Richard Thomas Greenwood (born March 1, 1987), better known by his ring name Kyle O'Reilly, is a Canadian professional wrestler. As of May 2022, he is signed to All Elite Wrestling (AEW), where he is a member of The Paragon and The Conglomeration stables. He is also known for working in Ring of Honor (ROH) from 2009 to 2017, and WWE (where he performed primarily on their NXT brand as a founding member of The Undisputed Era) from 2017 to 2021, using the same ring name in both companies. He is a former three-time NXT Tag Team Champion as a part of the Undisputed Era.

He also worked for New Japan Pro-Wrestling (NJPW) and competed for several independent professional wrestling promotion, most notably Pro Wrestling Guerrilla (PWG). In ROH, he is a one-time ROH World Champion and three-time ROH World Tag Team Champion alongside Bobby Fish as reDRagon. In PWG he is a one-time PWG World Champion and the winner of the promotion's 2013 Battle of Los Angeles. After his WWE contract expired, Greenwood signed with AEW in December 2021. With AEW, he is a former one-time AEW World Trios Champion with Conglomeration stablemates Orange Cassidy and Roderick Strong.

== Professional wrestling career ==
=== Extreme Canadian Championship Wrestling (2005–2017) ===
O'Reilly appeared at NWA: Extreme Canadian Championship Wrestling (ECCW)'s television tapings on December 23, 2005, where he and Tony Tisoy lost to Wrathchild and Killswitch. In January 2006, O'Reilly was in the main event of ECCW's tenth anniversary show, teaming with Fast Freddy Funk and Kurt Sterling to defeat Michelle Starr, Johnny Canuck and Vance Nevada. O'Reilly graduated from ECCW's House of Pain Wrestling School on May 29, 2006. At the graduation show, O'Reilly pinned his trainer Aaron Idol. He continued to appear in ECCW throughout the remainder of 2006 and early 2007. In March 2007, O'Reilly began a feud with Sid Sylum, losing to him in a "European Rounds" match on March 2, before he teamed with Veronika Vice to defeat Sylum and Nikki Matthews in a mixed tag team match the following night. On March 30, O'Reilly defeated Sylum in an "I Quit" match to end the feud.

In June 2007, O'Reilly entered the Pacific Cup tournament, where he faced Tony Kozina and Scotty Mac in the final and was victorious. On July 21, O'Reilly defeated Ice to win the NWA Canadian Junior Heavyweight Championship. He lost the championship back to Ice just six days later. The following month, on August 18, O'Reilly once again defeated Ice to win the NWA Canadian Junior Heavyweight Championship for the second time, but lost it back to Ice again the same day. In a rematch on August 24, the match ended in a double pin, causing the championship to be vacated. As a result, O'Reilly and Ice competed in a best of five series to determine the new champion. O'Reilly defeated Ice in the first match of the series on November 16, but Ice won the second to tie the series at one all. O'Reilly won the third match, but Ice won the fourth, a street fight. In the rubber match on December 28, O'Reilly defeated Ice in a Last Man Standing match to win the championship for the third time.

In 2008, O'Reilly attempted to win the Pacific Cup for the second year in a row, but was unsuccessful. He defeated Halo and Azeem en route to the final, a three-way elimination match against Billy Suede and El Phantasmo, but was the first man eliminated. In April 2009, O'Reilly and 19 other wrestlers took part in ECCW's Wrestling With Hunger marathon show, where he wrestled almost 40 matches in 72 hours to raise money for a local food bank.

On March 19, 2010, O'Reilly competed in a three-way match for the NWA Canadian Heavyweight Championship against champion Billy Suede and Sylum. In April, O'Reilly defeated Rick Sterling at Title vs. Title. He entered the Pacific Cup tournament again on June 6, defeating Azeem and Suede en route to the final where he lost to Artemis Spencer. At To Hell and Back on June 25, O'Reilly wrestled twice in one night, defeating Ice before losing to Sylum in a match for the NWA Canadian Heavyweight Championship. The following night, O'Reilly teamed with El Phantasmo to face Pop Culture in a two out of three falls match, which Pop Culture won, two falls to one. On July 10, O'Reilly lost to Tony Baroni. O'Reilly returned to ECCW to compete in the Pacific Cup tournaments in 2011 and 2014.

O'Reilly returned to ECCW on January 14, 2017, for Ballroom Brawl 7 where he defeated El Phantasmo for the ECCW Championship. He vacated the title 49 days later to ensure ECCW would have a fighting champion as he figured out his future.

=== Independent circuit (2008–2009) ===
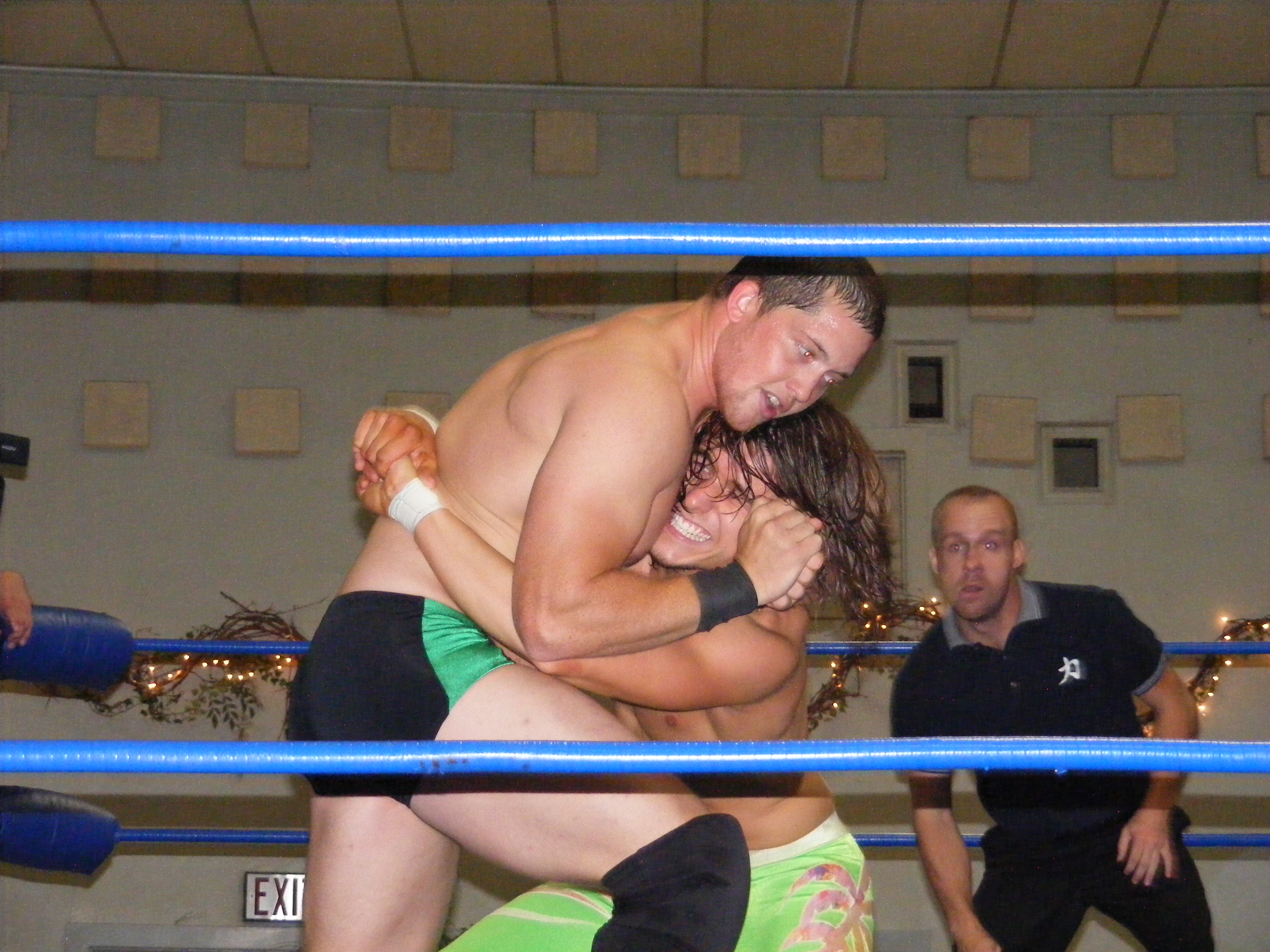
O'Reilly (left) wrestling Adam Cole at Chikara's Young Lions Cup tournament in 2010

O'Reilly made his Full Impact Pro (FIP) debut at the In Full Force show on May 30, 2008, where he lost to Damien Wayne. He appeared again for FIP the following night at Southern Justice 2008 wrestling Johnny DeBall. The match ended in a no contest when Davey Richards attacked both competitors. He returned to FIP in November 2009, appearing at the Jeff Peterson Memorial Cup, Night 1 where he teamed with Tony Kozina in a Tag Team Rumble which was won by Bumz R' Us.

On January 16, 2010, O'Reilly appeared at the Evolve promotion's inaugural show, where he defeated Bobby Fish. At Evolve 2: Hero vs. Hidaka, O'Reilly defeated Hallowicked, who a replacement for an injured TJP. O'Reilly suffered his first loss in the promotion at Evolve 3: Rise or Fall, when he lost to TJP. He lost his second match to Ricochet at Evolve 5: Danielson vs. Sawa, giving him a record of two wins and two losses.

O'Reilly appeared at Dragon Gate USA (DGUSA)'s Open the Freedom Gate pay-per-view taping on November 28, 2009, on the pre-show, where he defeated Adam Cole. At the DGUSA Fearless pay-per-view, O'Reilly won a six-way match on the pre-show, before he accompanied Davey Richards to the ring for his match. On September 26, 2010, O'Reilly participated in six pack challenge, which was won by Brodie Lee at a DGUSA in Milwaukee.

On August 28, 2010, O'Reilly competed in Chikara's Young Lions Cup tournament, but lost to Adam Cole in the quarter-finals.

On May 26, 2017, at WCPW Pro Wrestling World Cup - Canadian Qualifying Round O'Reilly defeated Tyson Dux in the first round of the Canada Leg. O'Reilly was defeated by Mike Bailey in the Semi-Finals. O'Reilly competed in the Progress Wrestling Super Strong Style 16 Tournament in May 2019.

=== Ring of Honor (2009–2017) ===
Future Shock: O'Reilly (left) and Adam Cole (right) at a Ring of Honor show in August 2011

O'Reilly made his Ring of Honor (ROH) debut in 2009. On November 13, 2009, Tony Kozina defeated O'Reilly. On the December 21, 2009 episode of Ring of Honor Wrestling, taped on November 5, O'Reilly lost to Chris Hero. At the February 5, 2010 tapings on Ring of Honor Wrestling, O'Reilly defeated Tony Kozina. On April 23, 2010, in Dayton, Ohio, O'Reilly defeated Sampson. On September 10, 2010, O'Reilly was defeated by Austin Aries. Three days later, ROH announced they had signed O'Reilly to a contract with the company.

O'Reilly then began to ally himself with fellow ROH newcomer Adam Cole, with the pair forming a tag team. At the October 2 Ring of Honor Wrestling tapings they defeated the team of Grizzly Redwood and Mike Sydal. They lost to Steve Corino and Kevin Steen on October 15, and the All Night Express of Kenny King and Rhett Titus at a show on October 16. They defeated the Bravado Brothers (Lance and Harlem) on the November 8 episode of Ring of Honor Wrestling. On November 12, O'Reilly participated in the 2010 edition of the Survival of the Fittest tournament, but was eliminated by Kevin Steen in the first round. The following night in Toronto, O'Reilly and Cole defeated the Bravado Brothers. O'Reilly made his ROH pay-per-view debut on December 18 at Final Battle 2010, where he and Cole were defeated by the All Night Express (Rhett Titus and Kenny King). On April 1 and 2 at Chapter One and Two of Honor Takes Center Stage, O'Reilly and Cole faced The Briscoe Brothers (Jay and Mark) and The Kings of Wrestling (Chris Hero and Claudio Castagnoli) in two losing efforts, despite putting on strong performances. On July 8, O'Reilly and Cole defeated the Bravado Brothers to earn a future shot at the ROH World Tag Team Championship. On July 25, ROH announced that O'Reilly had re-signed with the promotion. At the August 13 tapings of Ring of Honor Wrestling, the tag team of O'Reilly and Cole was named Future Shock.

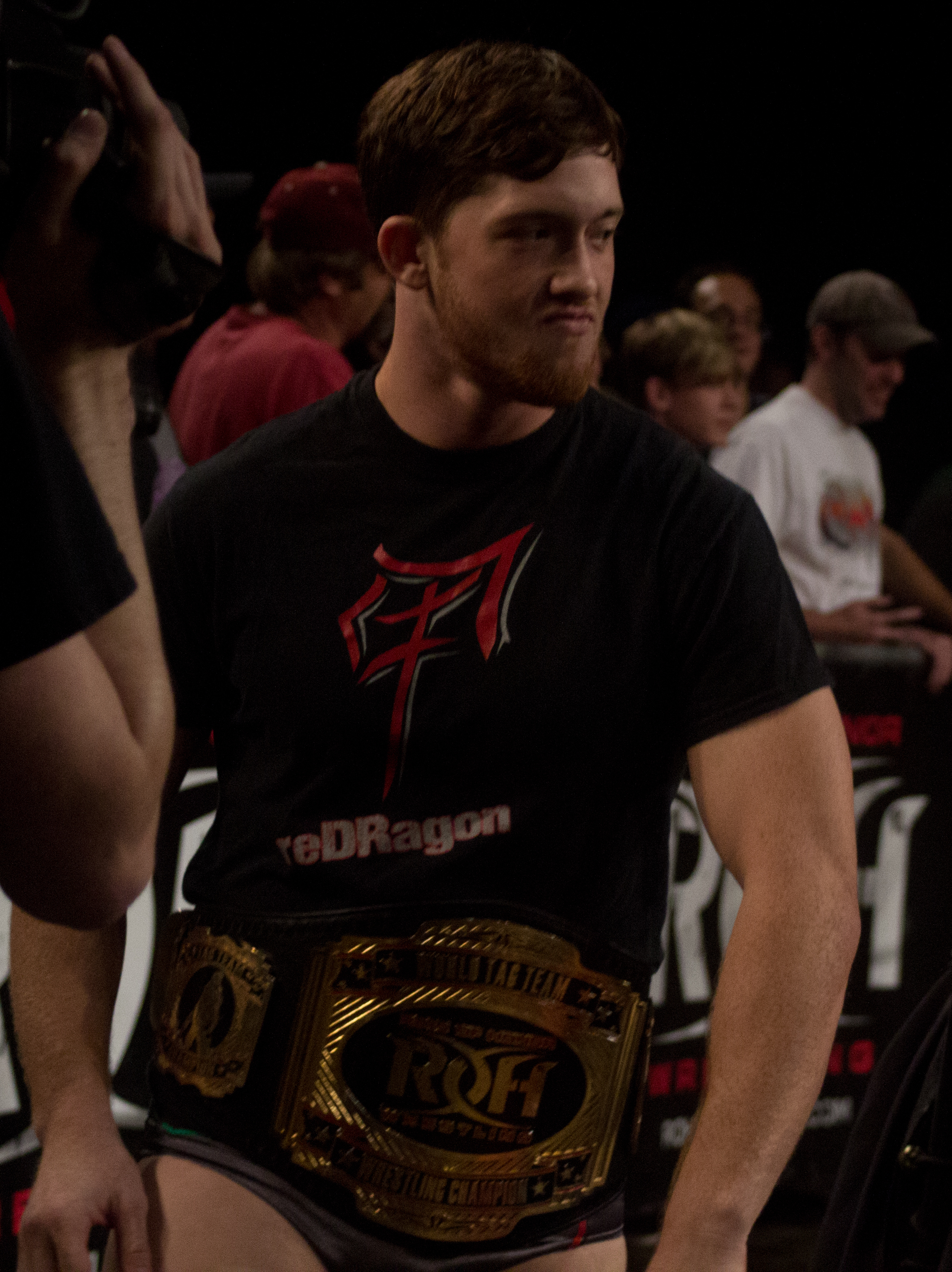
O'Reilly as ROH World Tag Team Champion in September 2013

At the January 7, 2012, tapings of Ring of Honor Wrestling, Future Shock disbanded and O'Reilly formed a new tag team named Team Ambition with Davey Richards, opposite Adam Cole and Eddie Edwards. Outside of ROH, the team also came to include Tony Kozina. On March 4 at the 10th Anniversary Show, Team Ambition was defeated in a main event tag team match by Cole and Edwards. On March 31 at Showdown in the Sun, O'Reilly faced Cole and defeated him using an underhanded tactic. On June 24 at Best in the World 2012: Hostage Crisis, O'Reilly was defeated by Cole in a "Hybrid Rules" match. Afterward, O'Reilly slapped Cole as he tried to make peace with his former partner and later announced that he was now going after Richards, cementing his heel turn.

On December 16 at Final Battle 2012: Doomsday, O'Reilly and Bobby Fish (known as reDRagon) faced the reformed The American Wolves (Davey Richards and Eddie Edwards) in a losing effort. At the following iPPV, 11th Anniversary Show on March 2, 2013, O'Reilly and Fish defeated the Briscoe Brothers for the ROH World Tag Team Championship. The same month, they successfully defended the championship against Alabama Attitude (Corey Hollis and Mike Posey), before retaining it at Best in the World 2013 in June in a three-way match against the C & C Wrestle Factory (Caprice Coleman and Cedric Alexander) and S.C.U.M. (Cliff Compton and Rhett Titus). They lost the title to the Forever Hooligans (Alex Koslov and Rocky Romero) on July 27, but regained the title from the American Wolves on August 17. Over the next several months reDRagon successfully defended the championship against teams including the C & C Wrestle Factory, the Forever Hooligans, and Jay Lethal and Michael Elgin. They retained the championship against Outlaw, Inc. (Homicide and Eddie Kingston) at Final Battle 2013 in December and Adrenaline Rush (A. C. H. and TaDarius Thomas) at the 12th Anniversary Show in February 2014. On March 8, 2014, reDRagon lost the title to The Young Bucks. ReDRagon regained the tag team championship from The Young Bucks on May 17, at the ROH and New Japan Pro-Wrestling (NJPW) co-promoted pay-per-view War of the Worlds. They successfully defended the championship against The Briscoe Brothers on June 7 and against Christopher Daniels and Frankie Kazarian at ROH's first live pay-per-view Best in the World 2014 on June 22. On November 23, reDRagon defeated ACH and Matt Sydal, The Addiction (Daniels and Kazarian), and The Briscoes to retain the ROH World Tag Team Championship and win the Tag Wars tournament. They followed up their victory with successful title defenses against the Time Splitters (Alex Shelley and Kushida) at Final Battle 2014, The Young Bucks in March 2015 at ROH's 13th Anniversary Show, and The Kingdom (Michael Bennett and Matt Taven) at Supercard of Honor IX. O'Reilly and Fish lost the tag team title to The Addiction at the Ring of Honor Wrestling tapings on April 4. On September 18, 2015, at All Star Extravaganza VII, O'Reilly received a shot at the ROH World Championship, but was defeated when Adam Cole turned on him.

On August 19, 2016, at Death Before Dishonor XIV, O'Reilly made his return and surprisingly interrupting Cole's victory celebration as the two-time ROH World Champion by attacking him, thus reigniting their feud. On December 2 at Final Battle, O'Reilly defeated Cole to win the ROH World Championship for the first time. On December 31, O'Reilly's ROH contract expired. He was said to be reviewing his future options and working for ROH on a per date agreement until he made a decision. On January 4, 2017, O'Reilly lost the ROH World Championship back to Cole at NJPW's Wrestle Kingdom 11 in Tokyo Dome. On January 11, 2017, O'Reilly was removed from the ROH roster page and pulled from all upcoming ROH events, indicating his contract with Ring of Honor had expired, ending his 8-year tenure with the company.

=== Pro Wrestling Guerrilla (2011–2017) ===
On October 22, 2011, O'Reilly debuted in Pro Wrestling Guerrilla alongside regular tag team partner Adam Cole as Future Shock. They unsuccessfully challenged The Young Bucks (Matt and Nick Jackson) for the PWG World Tag Team Championship. At Fear on December 10, Future Shock were defeated by the RockNES Monsters (Johnny Goodtime and Johnny Yuma). On April 21, 2012, Future Shock entered the annual Dynamite Duumvirate Tag Team Title Tournament (DDT4), where they made it to the semifinals, before losing to the eventual tournament winners, Super Smash Bros. (Player Uno and Stupefied). On July 21 at PWG's ninth anniversary event, Future Shock unsuccessfully challenged the Super Smash Bros. for the PWG World Tag Team Championship in a three-way ladder match, which also included The Young Bucks. On January 12, 2013, Future Shock entered the 2013 Dynamite Duumvirate Tag Team Title Tournament. After defeating the DojoBros (Eddie Edwards and Roderick Strong) in their first round match, the team was eliminated from the tournament in the semifinals by El Generico and Kevin Steen.

On August 30, O'Reilly entered the 2013 Battle of Los Angeles, defeating Trent? in his first round match. The following day, O'Reilly first defeated A. C. H. in the second round, then Drake Younger in the semifinals and finally Michael Elgin in the finals to win the 2013 Battle of Los Angeles and become the number one contender to the PWG World Championship, held by his former Future Shock partner Adam Cole. O'Reilly received his title shot on October 19, but was defeated by Cole, following interference from Kevin Steen and The Young Bucks. O'Reilly received a rematch for the PWG World Championship in a "Knockout or Submission Only" match on May 23, 2014, and defeated Cole to become the new champion. In August, O'Reilly made it to the semifinals of the 2014 Battle of Los Angeles, but was forced to withdraw from the match after suffering a storyline injury at the hands of Roderick Strong. On December 12, O'Reilly successfully defended the PWG World Championship against the 2014 Battle of Los Angeles winner Ricochet, only to lose it to Strong in an impromptu Guerrilla Warfare match immediately afterward.

On March 4, 2016, O’Reilly defeated Marty Scurll and the next night reDRagon lost to The Young Bucks failing to the tag titles. on July 29, O’Reilly received a PWG World Title match against Zack Sabre Jr. but lost. on September 2, reDRagon and Dalton Castle lost a six-man tag to Mount Rushmore 2.0 (Adam Cole, Matt Jackson and Nick Jackson). on September 3, O’Reilly defeated Matthew Riddle in the 1st round of a tournament but lost in the quarter-finals to Mark Haskins. on December 16, reDRagon defeated Death By Elbow (Chris Hero and JT Dunn). on April 21, 2017, O'Reilly lost to Michael Elgin. then on May 19, reDRagon lost to The Chosen Bros (Jeff Cobb and Matthew Riddle).

=== New Japan Pro-Wrestling (2014–2017) ===
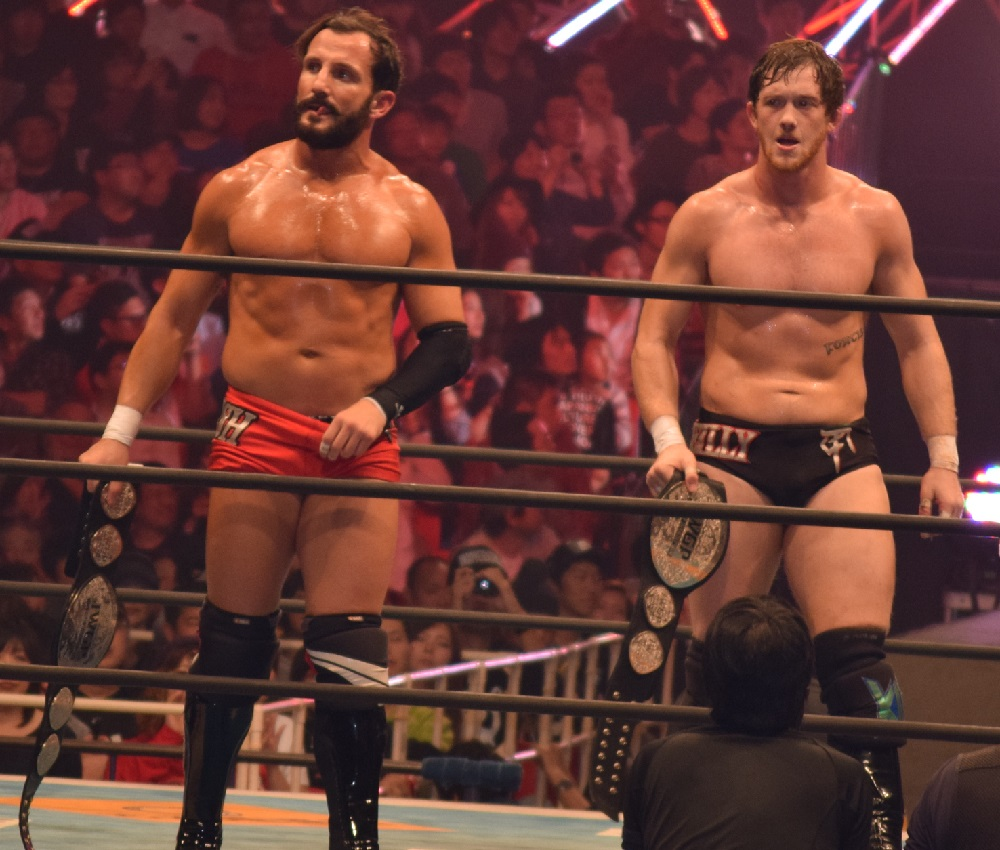
reDRagon as the IWGP Junior Heavyweight Tag Team Champions in November 2015

Through ROH's relationship with NJPW, reDRagon made an appearance for the Japanese promotion on August 10, unsuccessfully challenging Time Splitters (Alex Shelley and Kushida) for the IWGP Junior Heavyweight Tag Team Championship. reDRagon returned to NJPW on October 25 to take part in the 2014 Super Jr. Tag Tournament. On November 3, reDRagon defeated The Young Bucks in the finals to win the tournament. Five days later at Power Struggle, reDRagon defeated Time Splitters in a rematch to become the new IWGP Junior Heavyweight Tag Team Champions. They made their first successful title defense on January 4, 2015, at Wrestle Kingdom 9 in Tokyo Dome, in a four-way match against Forever Hooligans, Time Splitters and The Young Bucks. On February 11 at The New Beginning in Osaka, reDRagon lost the title to The Young Bucks in a three-way match, also involving Time Splitters. reDRagon returned to NJPW on May 3 at Wrestling Dontaku 2015, where they unsuccessfully challenged for the IWGP Junior Heavyweight Tag Team Championship in a three-way match with Roppongi Vice (Trent Beretta and Rocky Romero) and The Young Bucks. Later that month, O'Reilly entered the 2015 Best of the Super Juniors. Finishing with a record of six wins and one loss, he won his block and advanced to the finals of the tournament. On June 7, O'Reilly was defeated in the finals of the tournament by Kushida. Following the tournament, reDRagon received a rematch for the IWGP Junior Heavyweight Tag Team Championship in a three-way match, also involving Roppongi Vice, but were again defeated by The Young Bucks on July 5 at Dominion 7.5 in Osaka-jo Hall. On August 16, reDRagon defeated The Young Bucks to win the IWGP Junior Heavyweight Tag Team Championship for the second time. They lost the title back to The Young Bucks in a four-way match that also included Roppongi Vice and Matt Sydal and Ricochet on January 4, 2016, at Wrestle Kingdom 10 in Tokyo Dome. On October 10 at King of Pro-Wrestling, O'Reilly received his first singles title shot in NJPW, when he unsuccessfully challenged Katsuyori Shibata for the NEVER Openweight Championship. At Wrestle Kingdom 11, O'Reilly lost the ROH World Championship to Adam Cole.

=== WWE (2017–2021) ===
==== The Undisputed Era (2017–2021) ====
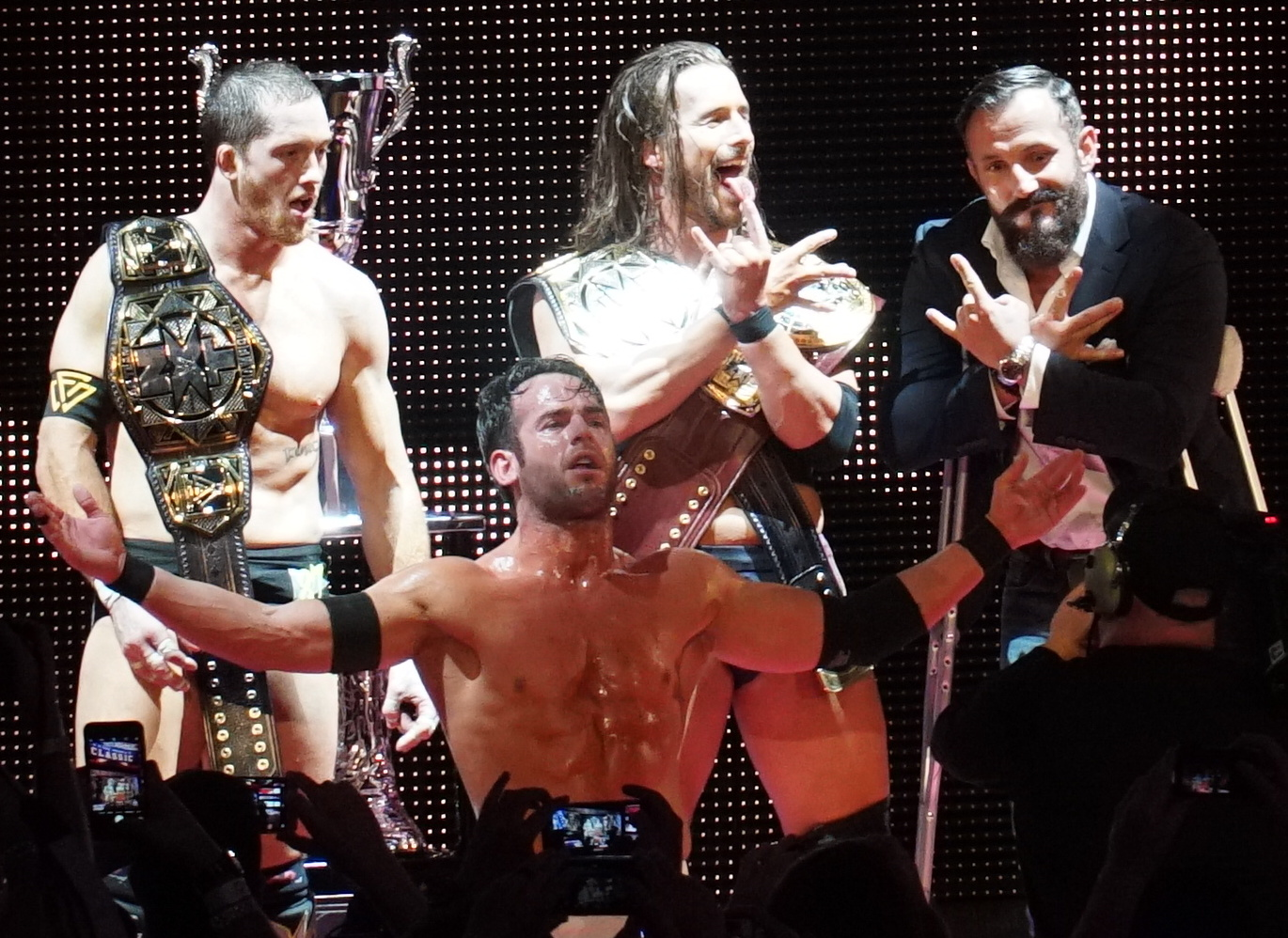
O'Reilly (left) as a member of The Undisputed Era

O'Reilly made his debut for WWE's NXT brand at the July 12, 2017, television tapings of NXT, which aired on August 2, losing to Aleister Black. At NXT TakeOver: Brooklyn III, O'Reilly along with Bobby Fish attacked Sanity after they won the NXT Tag Team Championship against The Authors of Pain. They then attacked newly crowned NXT Champion Drew McIntyre later that night, being joined by the debuting Adam Cole, turning heel in the process. The following month, the trio of O'Reilly, Cole, and Fish was officially dubbed The Undisputed Era.

On the September 20 episode of NXT, O'Reilly and Fish defeated Tyler Bate and Trent Seven due to interference by Adam Cole. On the October 4 episode, after Roderick Strong's match with Drew McIntyre, The Undisputed Era walked out and patted Strong on the back. On the October 25 episode, The Undisputed Era gave Roderick Strong an Undisputed Era armband, with Cole telling Strong that he is "not a loser" and offering him a position in their group. On the November 1 episode, The Undisputed Era attacked both SAnitY and The Authors of Pain during their match and it was announced that The Undisputed Era would be involved in the WarGames match at NXT TakeOver: WarGames.

On the November 8 episode of NXT, O'Reilly and Fish interrupted Roderick Strong vs. Adam Cole, leading to a massive brawl among the WarGames teams. At TakeOver: WarGames, The Undisputed Era defeated SAnitY and the team of Roderick Strong and The Authors Of Pain to win the first War Games match that was held in over 17 years. On the December 20 episode of NXT, O'Reilly and Fish defeated SAnitY to win the NXT Tag Team Championship. At NXT TakeOver: Philadelphia, The Undisputed Era defeated The Authors of Pain to retain the titles. At NXT TakeOver: New Orleans, The Undisputed Era defeated Roderick Strong and Pete Dunne and The Authors of Pain to retain the titles and win the Dusty Rhodes Tag Team Classic after Strong turned on his partner and joined Undisputed Era.

At NXT TakeOver: Chicago II, O'Reilly and Strong defeated Oney Lorcan and Danny Burch to retain the titles. On the June 19 tapings for the second annual United Kingdom Championship Tournament, O'Reilly and Strong lost the titles to Moustache Mountain (Tyler Bate and Trent Seven), but won them back two days later. At NXT TakeOver: Brooklyn 4, O'Reilly and Strong defeated Moustache Mountain to retain the titles. After the match, The War Raiders (Hanson and Rowe) attacked Strong and O’Reilly. On the November 14 episode of NXT, O'Reilly defeated Hanson, meaning Undisputed Era would have an advantage in numbers in the WarGames match at NXT TakeOver: WarGames. At the event, The Undisputed Era lost to Pete Dunne, Ricochet, and War Raiders (Hanson and Rowe). At NXT TakeOver: Phoenix, O'Reilly and Strong lost the titles to The War Raiders. At NXT TakeOver: XXV, O'Reilly and Fish faced The Street Profits (Angelo Dawkins and Montez Ford), The Forgotten Sons (Wesley Blake and Steve Cutler), and Oney Lorcan and Danny Burch in a fatal four-way ladder match for the vacant NXT Tag Team Championship, but the match was won by The Street Profits. Fish and O'Reilly later challenged The Street Profits for the titles at NXT TakeOver: Toronto on August 10, but again failed to become the champions. Six days later on the August 16 tapings of NXT, however, O'Reilly and Fish finally defeated The Street Profits for the NXT Tag Team Championship. O'Reilly and Fish would go on to hold the NXT Tag Team Titles for several months until they lost them to the BroserWeights (Pete Dunne and Matt Riddle) at NXT Takeover: Portland on February 16, 2020. Following this, O'Reilly stopped appearing with Undisputed Era on television and only appeared in pre-taped segments as he refrained to compete during the COVID-19 pandemic due to his diabetes disease. He made his in-ring return on the August 5 episode of NXT where he and Fish unsuccessfully challenged Marcel Barthel and Fabian Aichner of Imperium for the NXT Tag Team Championship.

On the September 16 episode of NXT, O'Reilly saved Jake Atlas from a beatdown at the hands of Tommaso Ciampa, thus turning face in the process. The following week on NXT, O'Reilly defeated Bronson Reed, Cameron Grimes, Kushida, and Timothy Thatcher in the first-ever Gauntlet Eliminator match to challenge for his first singles title in the promotion, becoming number one contender for the NXT Championship at NXT TakeOver 31 against Finn Bálor. At the event, O'Reilly was unsuccessful in winning the title. After the event, O'Reilly and the rest of The Undisputed Era would begin to feud with The Kings of NXT (Pat McAfee, Pete Dunne, Danny Burch, and Oney Lorcan). NXT General Manager William Regal would announce that Undisputed Era would face The Kings of NXT in a WarGames match at NXT TakeOver: WarGames. At the event, Undisputed Era would defeat The Kings of NXT. On the December 16 episode of NXT, O'Reilly defeated Dunne to become the number one contender to the NXT Championship at NXT: New Year's Evil. On January 6, 2021, at NXT New Year's Evil, he was unsuccessful once again.

At NXT TakeOver: Vengeance Day, The Undisputed Era aided Finn Bálor to fend off Pete Dunne, Danny Burch, and Oney Lorcan. They then posed in the ring, however, Cole attacked Bálor. When O'Reilly protested against Cole attacking Bálor, Cole then hit the superkick to O'Reilly, thus signalling the end of The Undisputed Era.

==== Final storylines (2021) ====
On the following episode of NXT, Cole once again attacked O'Reilly during the six-man tag team match. Cole then hit O'Reilly with a brainbuster on the steel steps, causing O'Reilly to get stretchered out of ringside. The kayfabe injury led to fans speculating that O'Reilly had suffered a seizure. A lot of fans and wrestlers showed their support and concern for O'Reilly via social media. It was later revealed that day that O'Reilly never suffered a seizure. O'Reilly returned on the March 11 episode and attacked Cole during the NXT Championship match between Cole and Bálor. On the March 24 episode of NXT, O'Reilly and Cole would sign a contract to make their unsanctioned match at NXT TakeOver: Stand & Deliver official. At the event, O'Reilly would defeat Cole.

Soon after, O'Reilly began to pursue the NXT Championship again, therefore beginning a feud with the reigning champion Karrion Kross. On the June 1 episode of NXT, O'Reilly faced Johnny Gargano and Pete Dunne in a triple threat match for an NXT Championship opportunity at NXT TakeOver: In Your House which ended in a no contest after Cole returned and laid out all three men. Later that night, it was announced that Kross would defend his title in a five-way match against O'Reilly, Cole, Gargano, and Dunne. At the event, Kross retained the title. After failing to win the championship, O'Reilly resumed his feud with Cole and a rematch between the two was made for The Great American Bash, where O'Reilly was defeated by Cole. He would continue to feud with Cole until he defeated him at NXT TakeOver 36, ending the feud.

After his feud with Cole ended, O'Reilly would form an uneasy partnership with newcomer Von Wagner, who helped him fend off an attack from Pete Dunne and Ridge Holland. On the October 12 episode of NXT 2.0, O'Reilly and Wagner teamed up to defeat Dunne and Holland. Soon after they declared their intentions for the NXT Tag Team Championship and on the November 30 episode, defeated Joaquin Wilde and Raul Mendoza to become the number one contenders. At NXT WarGames, O'Reilly and Wagner faced the reigning champions Imperium in a losing effort and after the match, Wagner attempted to attack O'Reilly but O'Reilly would counter his attack. On the following episode of NXT 2.0, O'Reilly faced Wagner in a steel cage match but would be defeated and after the match would have his head smashed repeatedly with the steel cage door by Wagner. This would be O'Reilly's final appearance on NXT as his WWE contract expired on December 10 and he chose not to renew it.

=== All Elite Wrestling (2021–present) ===
==== The Elite; injury (2021–2023) ====
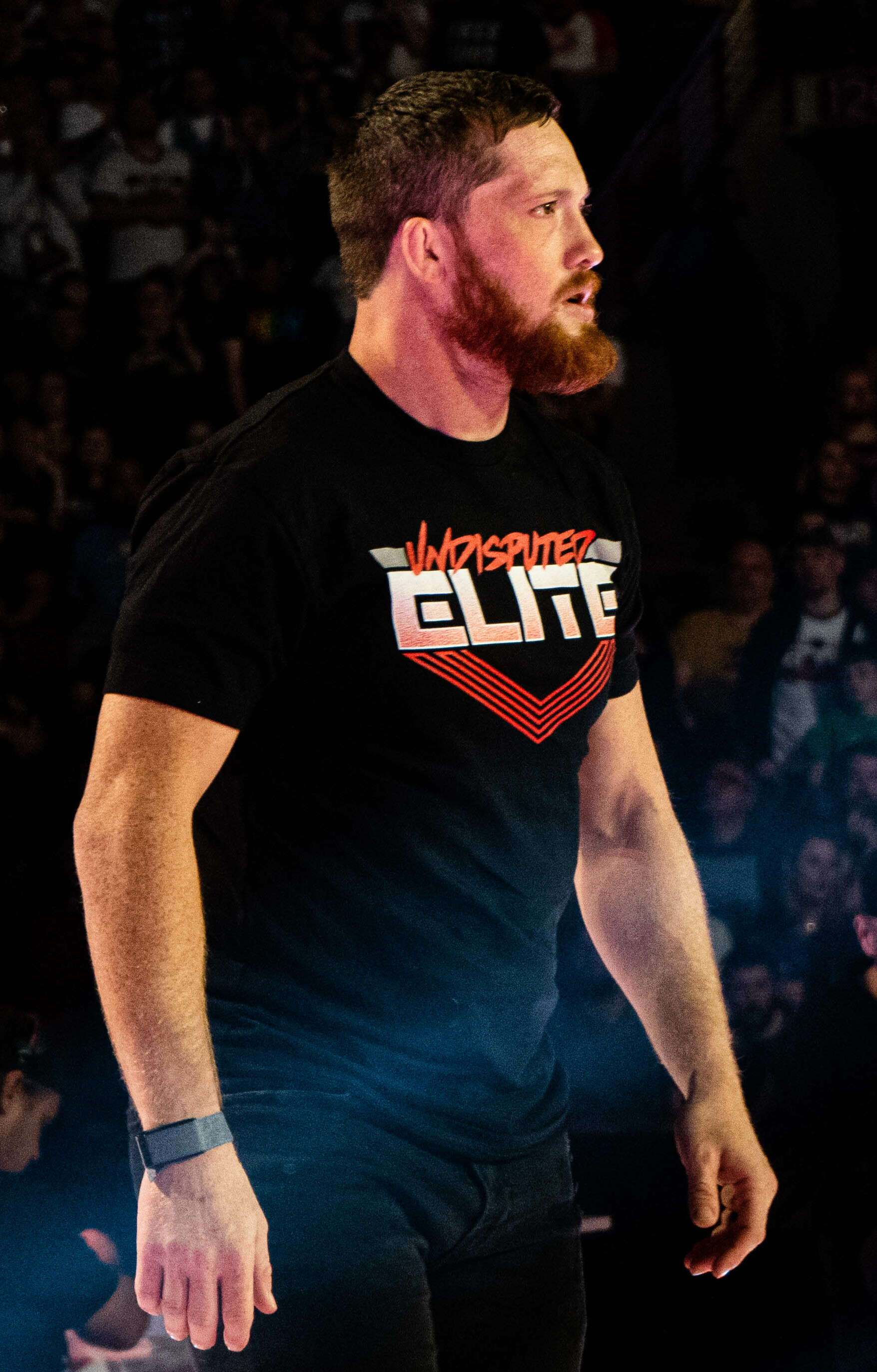
O'Reilly in June 2022

On December 22, 2021, O'Reilly made his debut for All Elite Wrestling (AEW) at the special Holiday Bash episode of Dynamite, attacking Orange Cassidy during his match with Adam Cole, allowing Cole to win and joining The Elite, thus establishing himself as a heel, and after the match, O'Reilly reunited with Cole and Bobby Fish. They then formed the Undisputed Elite with the Young Bucks. On the February 23, 2022 episode of Dynamite, reDRagon (O'Reilly and Fish) would win a 10-team battle royal to become a place in the Triple Threat match for the AEW Tag Team Championship at AEW Revolution after O’Reilly eliminated Matt Jackson. ReDRagon would lose the match. On May 23, 2022, O'Reilly made public that he had signed a five-year deal with AEW. In May 2022, O'Reilly competed in the Owen Hart Foundation Men's Tournament until he was eliminated by Samoa Joe in a semifinal match which took place on Dynamite on May 25. At Double or Nothing O'Reilly defeated Darby Allin. On the June 8 episode of Dynamite, O'Reilly won a Casino Battle Royal to face Jon Moxley, in the show's main event to advance to AEW×NJPW: Forbidden Door for a chance to win the interim AEW World Championship, however he lost to Moxley. During the match, O'Reilly injured his neck. It was later announced that O'Reilly had undergone neck fusion surgery. In January 2023, it was reported that O'Reilly would be out longer than anticipated due to a post-surgical issue.

==== The Conglomeration and The Paragon (2024–present) ====
O'Reilly then returned from injury at Revolution on March 3, 2024, refusing an offer to join his former Undisputed Era stablemates Adam Cole and Roderick Strong in the Undisputed Kingdom, turning face in the process. On the March 16 episode of AEW Collision, O'Reilly wrestled his first match in almost two years, defeating Bryan Keith. On the April 13 episode of Battle of the Belts, O'Reilly decided to come to the aid of Rocky Romero after Strong defeated him in an eliminator match for a future shot at the AEW International Championship, Strong then attacked O'Reilly. On April 21 at Dynasty, O'Reilly unsuccessfully challenged Strong for the International Championship. On the May 11 episode of Collision, O'Reilly unsuccessfully challenged Adam Copeland for the AEW TNT Championship. In June 2024, O'Reilly formed an alliance with Mark Briscoe and Orange Cassidy known as "The Conglomeration." In November 2024, O'Reilly became involved in the feud between Adam Cole and MJF, where he warned Cole to not pursue a match with MJF. On December 11 at Winter is Coming, O'Reilly lost to Cole in a number one contender's match for MJF's Dynamite Diamond Ring. On December 28 at Worlds End, O'Reilly and Strong came to the aid of Cole from an MJF attack, joining the Undisputed Kingdom in the process.

On the April 9, 2025 episode of Dynamite, Cole addressed winning the AEW TNT Championship in a backstage segment alongside O'Reilly and Strong and formed their own group known as "The Paragon". On May 25 at Double or Nothing, Paragon were defeated by Don Callis Family (Josh Alexander, Konosuke Takeshita, and Kyle Fletcher). On July 12 at All In Zero Hour, O'Reilly rejoined The Conglomeration, teaming with Hologram, Tomohiro Ishii, and "Big Boom!" AJ to defeat the Don Callis Family (Hechicero, Rocky Romero, Lance Archer, and Trent Beretta). Despite rejoining The Conglomerartion, O'Reilly was still considered a member of The Paragon. O'Reilly teamed with Strong, Darby Allin, Mark Briscoe, and Orange Cassidy to defeat the Death Riders (Jon Moxley, Claudio Castagnoli, Wheeler Yuta, Daniel Garcia, and Pac) in Blood and Guts match on November 12 at the namesake event with O'Reilly making Moxley submit for the win. On November 22 at Full Gear, O'Reilly defeated Moxley by submission in a No Holds Barred match. After Full Gear, AEW president Tony Khan announced that O'Reilly had suffered an undisclosed injury and was not medically cleared to compete.

At Dynasty on April 12, 2026, O'Reilly returned as the surprise teammate for his Conglomeration stablemates Orange Cassidy and Roderick Strong to defeat The Dogs (David Finlay, Clark Connors, and Gabe Kidd) and win the AEW World Trios Championship. This marked O'Reilly's first championship in AEW. On the May 20 episode of Dynamite, O'Reilly wrestled the reigning AEW Continental Champion Jon Moxley to a time-limit draw in a championship eliminator match to earn a title match, but failed to win the title from Moxley four days later at Double or Nothing. On the July 29 episode of Dynamite, The Conglomeration lost their Trios Championship to The Demand (Ricochet, Bishop Kaun, and Toa Liona), ending their reign at 108 days.

== Personal life ==
Greenwood has type 1 diabetes. He cites Bret Hart, Toshiaki Kawada, Royce Gracie, and Muhammad Ali as his role models. Growing up, Greenwood participated in several sports, including amateur wrestling, ice hockey, football, lacrosse, kickboxing, Jiu-jitsu, and snowboarding, and briefly played rugby in Europe. He remains part of a rugby club and holds a purple belt in Brazilian jiu-jitsu. While training to become a professional wrestler, he worked as a cook at a local restaurant. Greenwood once lived with Davey Richards and Tony Kozina.

On January 17, 2022, Greenwood and his wife had a daughter named after his late mother.

== Championships and accomplishments ==
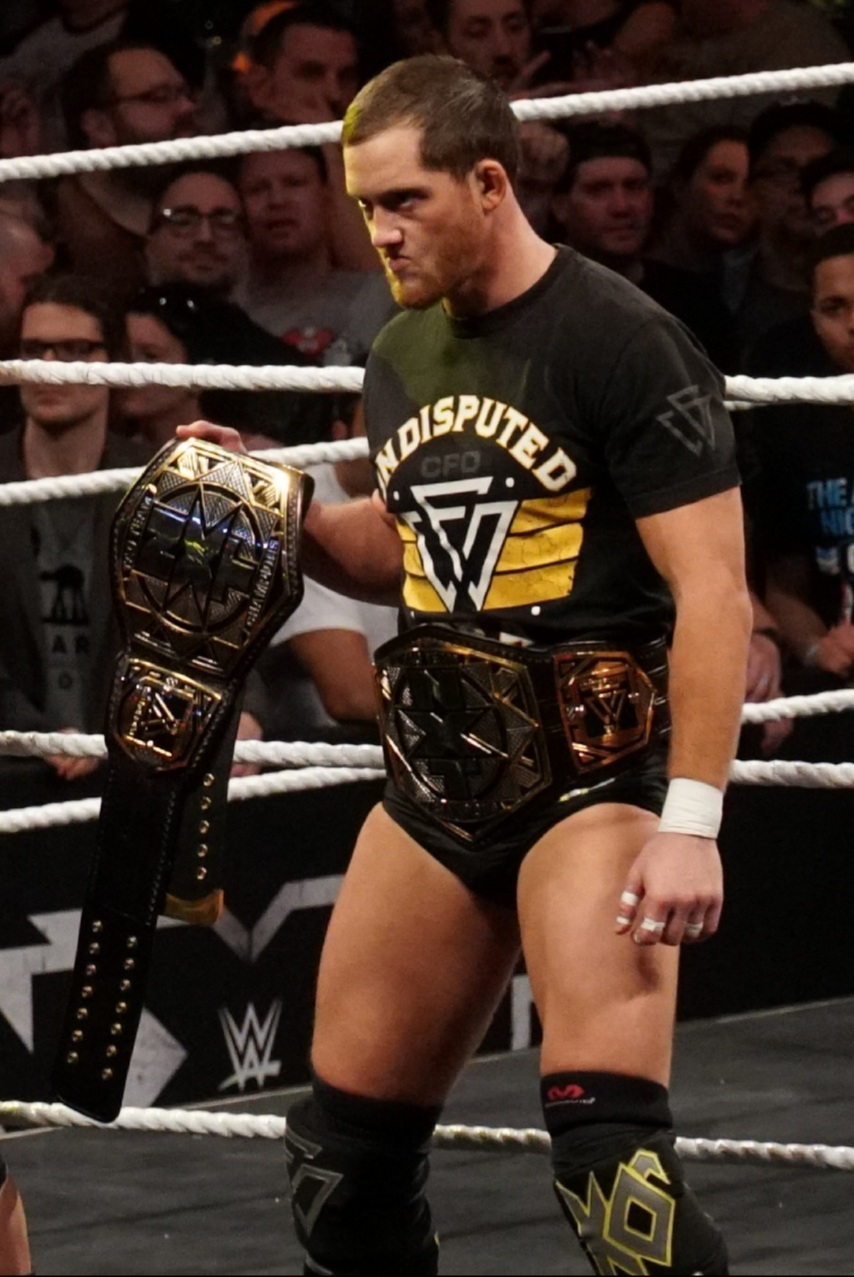
O'Reilly is a record three-time NXT Tag Team Champion...

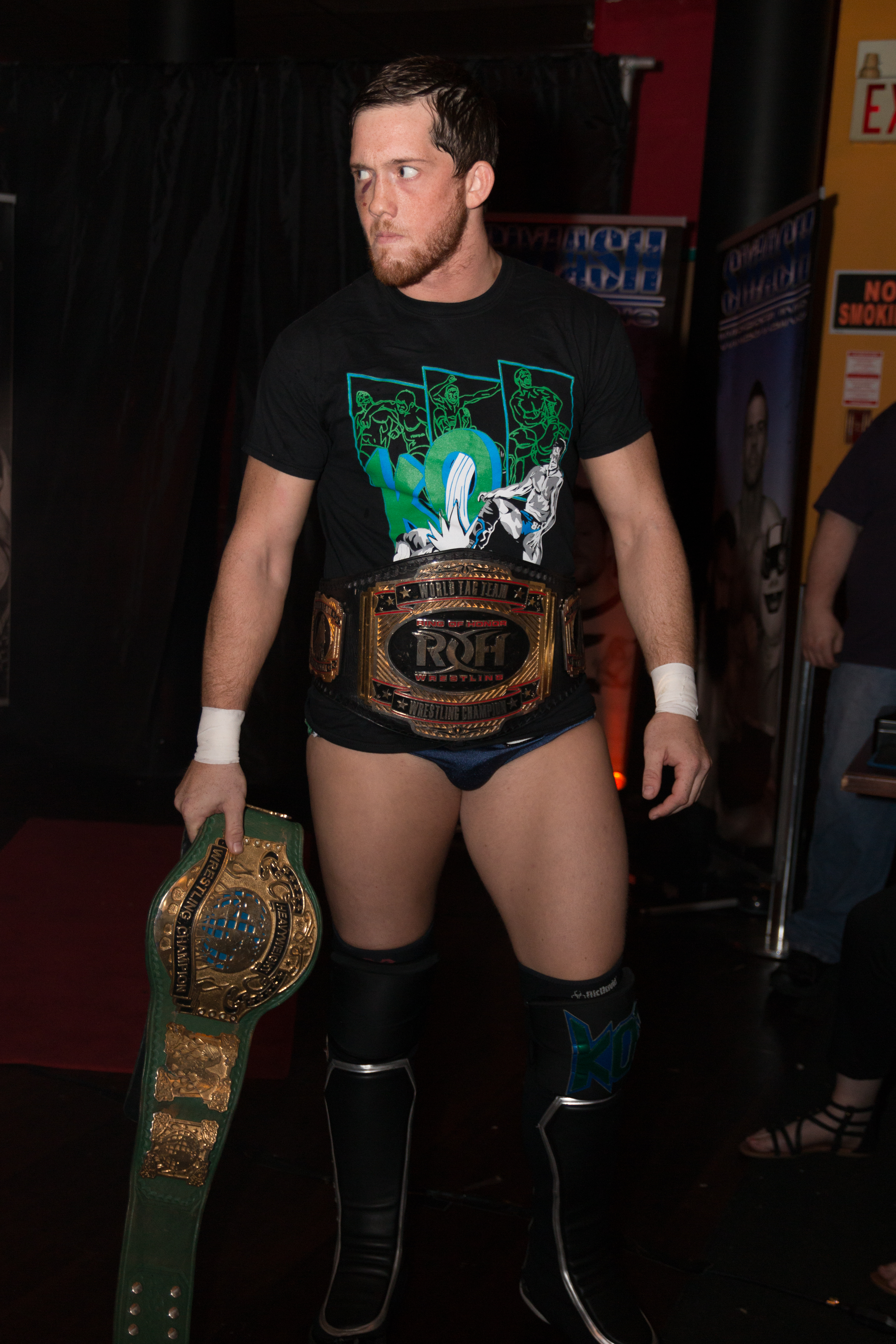
...a three-time ROH World Tag Team Champion (around waist), a former PWG World Champion...

...and a two-time IWGP Junior Heavyweight Tag Team Champion

- All Elite Wrestling
  - AEW World Trios Championship (1 time) – with Roderick Strong and Orange Cassidy
  - Men's Casino Battle Royale (2022)
- High Risk Wrestling
  - HRW Tag Team Championship (1 time) – with Bobby Fish
- New Japan Pro-Wrestling
  - IWGP Junior Heavyweight Tag Team Championship (2 times) – with Bobby Fish
  - Super Jr. Tag Tournament (2014) – with Bobby Fish
- NWA Extreme Canadian Championship Wrestling / Elite Canadian Championship Wrestling
  - ECCW Championship (1 time)
  - NWA Canadian Junior Heavyweight Championship (3 times)
  - Pacific Cup (2007)
- Pro Wrestling Guerrilla
  - PWG World Championship (1 time)
  - Battle of Los Angeles (2013)
- Pro Wrestling Illustrated
  - Tag Team of the Year (2019) – with Bobby Fish
  - PWI ranked him No. 32 of the top 500 singles wrestlers in the PWI 500 in 2016
- Pro Wrestling Prestige
  - PWP Tag Team Championship (1 time) – with Davey Richards
- Ring of Honor
  - ROH World Championship (1 time)
  - ROH World Tag Team Championship (3 times) – with Bobby Fish
  - ROH World Tag Team Championship #1 Contender Lottery Tournament (2011) – with Adam Cole
  - Tag Wars Tournament (2014) – with Bobby Fish
- SoCal Uncensored
  - Match of the Year (2012) with Adam Cole vs. Super Smash Bros. (Player Uno and Stupefied) and The Young Bucks on July 21
- St. Louis Anarchy
  - Medallion Tournament (2012)
- WWE
  - NXT Tag Team Championship (3 times) – with Bobby Fish, Adam Cole and Roderick Strong (1)^{1}, Roderick Strong (1), Bobby Fish (1)
  - Dusty Rhodes Tag Team Classic (2018) – with Adam Cole
  - NXT Year-End Award (4 times)
    - Tag Team of the Year (2018) – with Roderick Strong
    - Tag Team of the Year (2019) – with Bobby Fish
    - Tag Team of the Year (2020) – with The Undisputed Era (Bobby Fish, Adam Cole and Roderick Strong)
    - Match of the Year (2020) vs. Finn Bálor at NXT TakeOver: 31
  - Bumpy Award (1 time)
    - Rivalry of the Half-Year (2021) – vs Adam Cole

1 Fish and O'Reilly originally won the title as a duo, but Cole and Strong also became recognized as champions under the Freebird Rule after Fish suffered an injury.
