= Rich Swann =

American professional wrestler (born 1991)

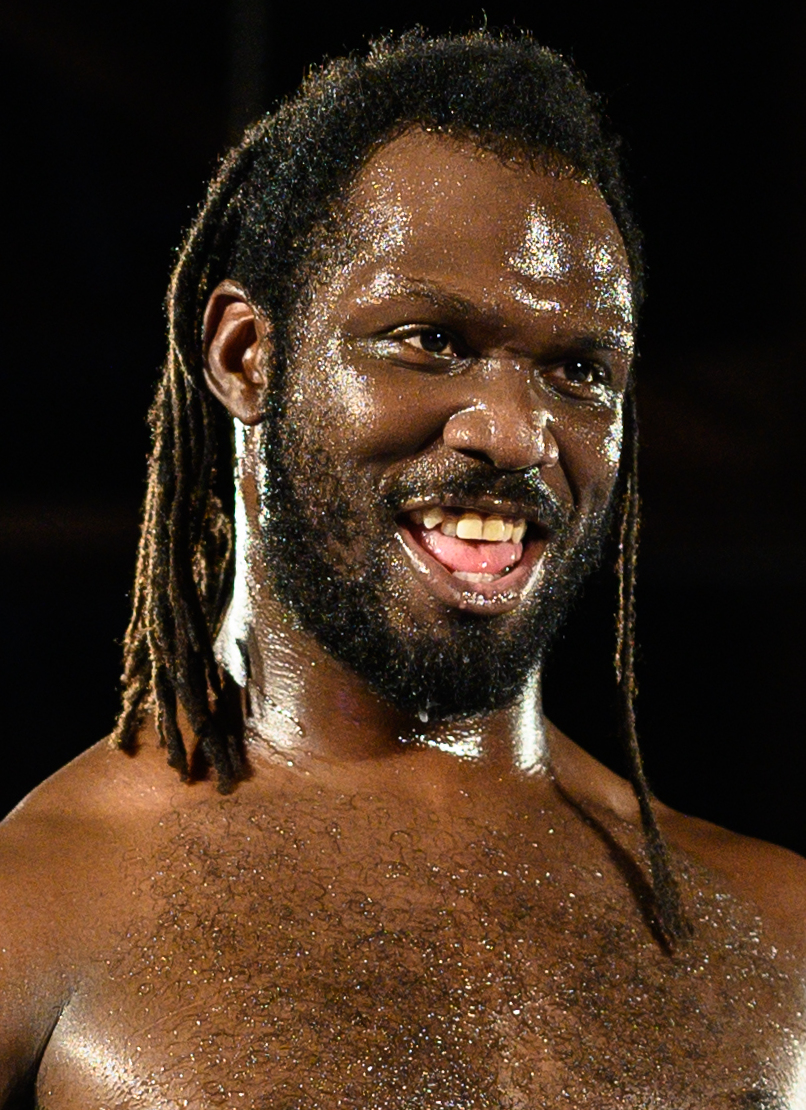
- Swann in 2019

Personal information
- Born: Richard Anthony Swann; February 15, 1991 (age 35) Baltimore, Maryland, U.S.
- Spouse: Su Yung (m. 2017)
- Children: 1

Professional wrestling career
- Ring name(s): El Negro Mysterio; Rich Ichikawa; Rich Money; Rich Swann; Swann Hansen; Rapid Delivery Pete
- Billed height: 5 ft 8 in (173 cm)
- Billed weight: 168 lb (76 kg)
- Billed from: Baltimore, Maryland; Lindenhood, New Jersey; Moneyville, Maryland
- Trained by: Adam Flash; Ray Alexander; Jermaine Jubilee; D. J. Hyde; Drew Gulak; Ruckus; Sabian
- Debut: 2008

Richard Anthony Swann (born February 15, 1991) is an American professional wrestler. He is signed to Total Nonstop Action Wrestling (TNA), where he performs under his real name (stylized as Rich Swann). He also performs on the independent circuit.

Swann is also known for his time in WWE, where he was a former WWE Cruiserweight Champion. Additionally, Swann has competed for promotions such as Full Impact Pro, Combat Zone Wrestling, Evolve, Pro Wrestling Guerrilla (PWG), Chikara, Combat Zone Wrestling (CZW), Dragon Gate and Major League Wrestling (MLW). He is a former RevPro British Tag Team Champion, FIP World Heavyweight Champion, FIP Tag Team Champion, Open the United Gate, Open the Owarai Gate, and Open the Triangle Gate Champion.

In 2018, Swann signed with Impact Wrestling winning the Impact X Division Championship and later winning the Impact World Championship. In 2021, Swann would unify the Impact World Championship and the TNA World Heavyweight Championship. In 2022, Swann would win the Impact Digital Media Championship.

== Early life ==
Richard Anthony Swann was born in Baltimore, Maryland, on February 15, 1991. Swann's father was murdered by his girlfriend when Swann was 12 years old. His mother died when he was 16, after which Swann "fell in with a rough crowd" and began using cocaine. However, after his supplier died of a heart attack, Swann, with help from his aunt, stopped using cocaine, got an apartment and finished high school.

== Professional wrestling career ==
=== Early career ===
Swann originally started training for professional wrestling at the age of 14 in 2005 under Adam Flash, Darren Wyse and Ray Alexander in York, Pennsylvania. He made his debut in 2008, working under the ring names Rich Money and El Negro Mysterio. Swann's influences include Psicosis, Eddie Guerrero, Chavo Guerrero, Rey Mysterio, Rob Van Dam, Jerry Lynn, Super Crazy, and The Hardy Boyz.

=== Combat Zone Wrestling (2009–2013) ===
In 2009, Swann began training under D. J. Hyde, Drew Gulak, Ruckus, and Sabian at Combat Zone Wrestling's (CZW) training school and made his debut for the promotion on May 9, 2009, wrestling in a dark match, where he was defeated by Sabian. Swann made his main card debut on June 13 with a win over Chris Halo. On October 10, Swann entered a tournament to determine the inaugural CZW Wired TV Champion. After a win over Joe Gacy, he was eliminated by Adam Cole in his second round match on November 14. On January 30, 2010, Swann formed the "Irish Driveby" tag team with Ryan McBride, defeating the Spanish Armada (Alex Colon and LJ Cruz) in their first match together. After a win over the Switchblade Conspiracy (Joe Gacy and Sami Callihan) on February 13, Swann and McBride were granted a shot at the CZW World Tag Team Championship on March 13, but were defeated by the Best Around (Bruce Maxwell and TJ Cannon). Afterwards, Irish Driveby earned victories over teams like Notorious Inc. (Devon Moore and Drew Blood), The Garden State Gods (Corvis Fear and Myke Quest), and Team Macktion (Kirby Mack and T.J. Mack). On August 7, Swann unsuccessfully challenged Drew Gulak for the CZW Wired TV Championship. On September 10, Swann and McBride entered a tournament to determine the new CZW World Tag Team Champions, defeating Team Macktion in their first round match. However, on November 13, they were eliminated from the tournament in the semifinals by Philly's Most Wanted (Blk Jeez and Joker). On January 7, 2011, the Irish Driveby was defeated by the Runaways (Joe Gacy and Ryan Slater) in what would turn out to be the team's final match together.

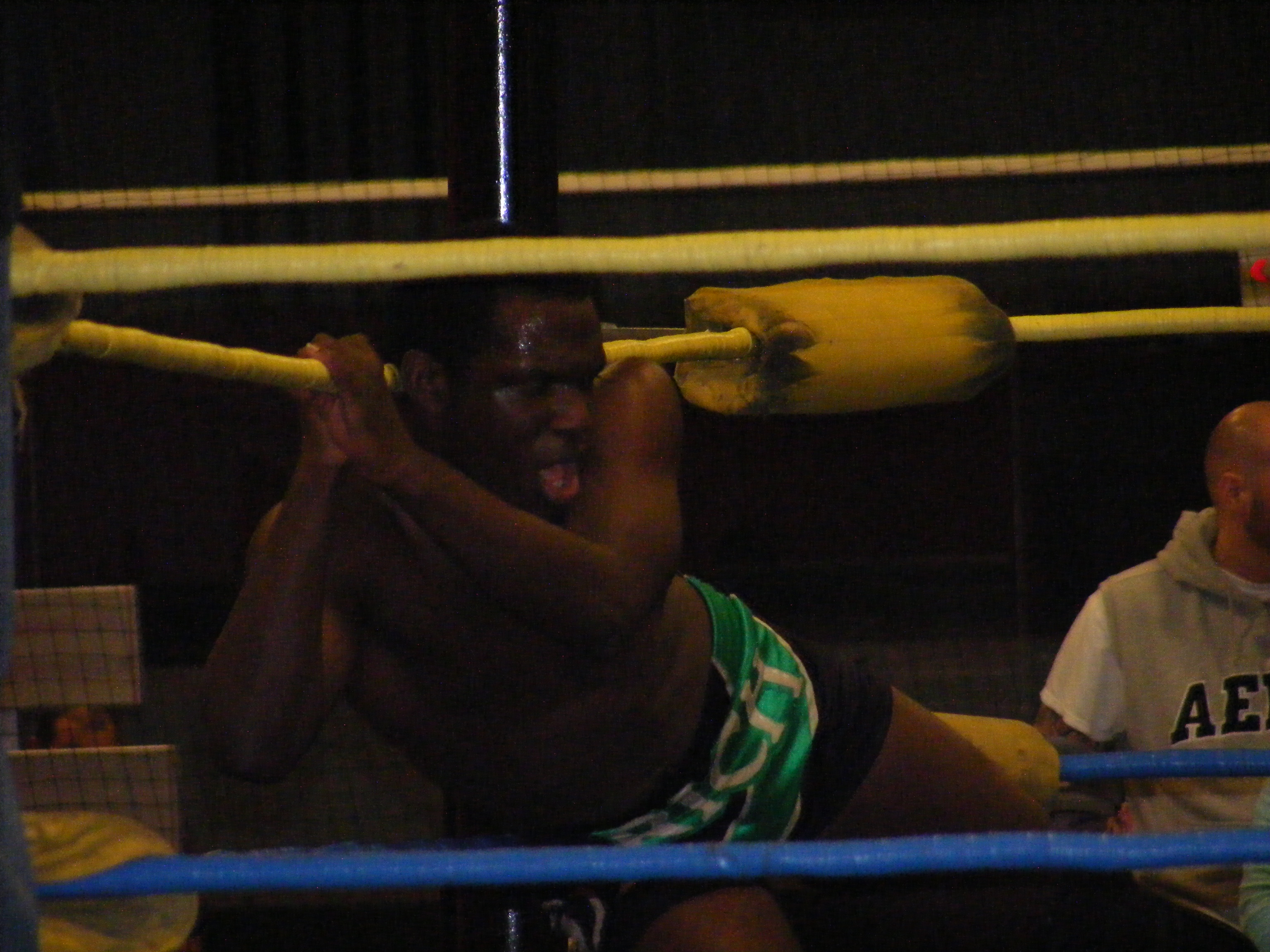
Swann at a CZW show in October 2010

After twice failing to qualify for the Best of the Best X tournament and unsuccessfully challenging Adam Cole for the CZW World Junior Heavyweight Championship, Swann was looking to restart his CZW career, but on May 14, 2011, suffered another loss against Alex Colon. After the match, Robbie Mireno, Ruckus and Chrissy Rivera entered the ring and announced they were reforming Blackout, before offering both Swann and Colon spots in the stable, which both accepted. With his new partners, Swann formed a new, exciting and popular version of one of CZW's most accomplished groups. After a six-month break from CZW, during which Swann supposedly represented Blackout in Japan, Swann returned to the promotion on November 12, when he, Colon and Ruckus defeated Alex Payne, Joe Gacy and Ryan Slater in a six-man tag team match. On January 14, 2012, Swann received another shot at the CZW World Junior Heavyweight Championship, but was unable to dethrone Sami Callihan. During 2012, Swann began spending more and more time in Japan, resulting in his time with Blackout being short-lived as early in the year, Alex Colon and Chrissy Rivera quit Blackout to form the new 4Loco stable. After another seven-month break from CZW, Swann returned to the promotion on August 11, losing to newcomer Shane Strickland in a singles match. The two had a rematch on September 8, where Strickland was again victorious. After the match, Swann offered to shake Strickland's hand, but then laid him out with a spin kick. On November 10, Swann first unsuccessfully challenged Masada for the CZW World Heavyweight Championship during an afternoon show and later in the evening, also failed to capture the CZW Wired TV Championship from A. R. Fox in a four-way match, which also included Lucky 13 and rival Shane Strickland. Swann and Strickland had their third singles match against each other on December 8 at Cage of Death XIV, where Swann was able to pick up his first win over the newcomer. Swann received another shot at the CZW Wired TV Championship on February 9, 2013, at CZW's fourteenth anniversary show, but was again defeated by A. R. Fox.

=== Dragon Gate USA and Evolve (2010–2015) ===
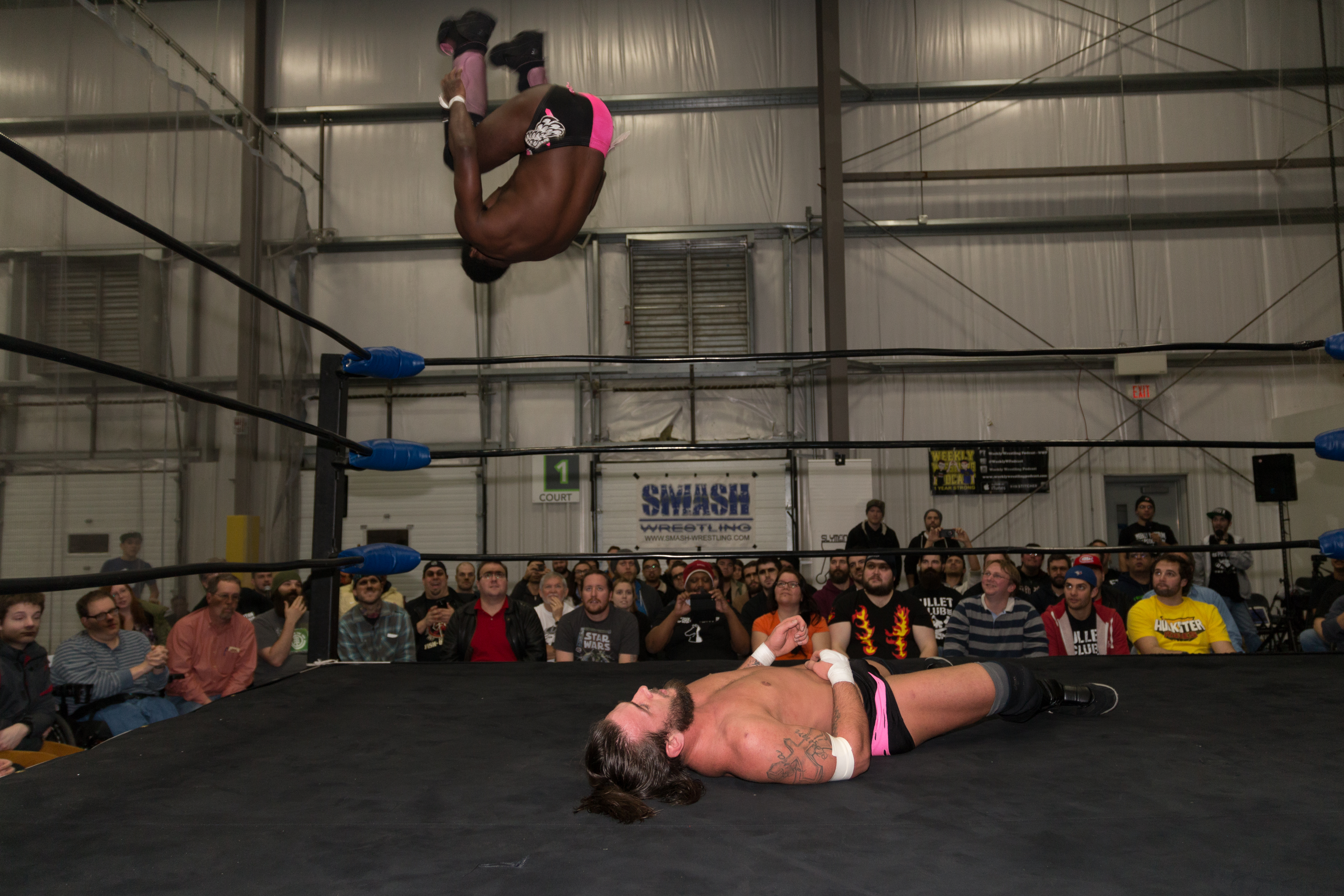
Swann performing a 450° splash on J. T. Dunn

On July 24, 2010, Swann made his debut for Dragon Gate USA, defeating Scott Reed at the tapings of the Enter the Dragon 2010 pay-per-view. On September 11, Swann made his debut for Dragon Gate USA's close affiliate, Evolve, taking part in a six-way match, which was won by Johnny Gargano. Swann returned to Dragon Gate USA during the September 25–26 weekend, taking part in four-way and six-way matches won by Chuck Taylor and Brodie Lee, respectively. On October 29 at Bushido: Code of the Warrior, Dragon Gate USA's first live internet pay-per-view, Swann was defeated in a singles match by Homicide. Following the match, Swann was approached by Austin Aries, who offered to take him under his wing as his new protégé. However, after Aries was defeated by Masato Yoshino, Swann seemingly turned down his offer. Later that same event, Swann, Chuck Taylor and Johnny Gargano attacked Cima and Ricochet, before announcing that they were not joining any of Dragon Gate USA's established stables, but were instead forming a new one named "Ronin". The villainous Ronin stable wrestled their first match together at the following day's Freedom Fight 2010 pay-per-view, defeating Aries, Genki Horiguchi and Ricochet in a six-man tag team match. On January 28, 2011, at United: NYC, Swann was defeated by Aries in a singles match. During that same weekend, Ronin started a rivalry with the Blood Warriors, a new villainous stable led by Cima, effectively ending Ronin's run as villains. On March 1, Swann and the rest of the Ronin stable started their first tour of Japan with Dragon Gate USA's parent promotion, Dragon Gate. During the tour, which lasted until March 15, Ronin worked mainly in matches against the Blood Warriors. On April 3 at Open the Ultimate Gate 2011, Austin Aries, who had just lost a match, where he had put his Dragon Gate USA career on the line, feigned passing the torch to his former rivals in Ronin, but instead ended up turning on them and joining Blood Warriors. On June 3 at Fearless 2011, Swann was defeated in a singles match by Blood Warriors leader Cima, following interference from Aries. Two days later at Enter the Dragon 2011, Swann and Gargano teamed with Masato Yoshino in a six-man elimination tag team match, where they defeated Blood Warriors representatives Austin Aries, Brodie Lee and Cima.

On June 8, 2011, Swann, without Chuck Taylor and Johnny Gargano, started his second tour of Dragon Gate. During the tour, Swann aligned himself with Blood Warriors' rival stable, Junction Three. On July 24, Swann unsuccessfully challenged Naoki Tanizaki for the Blood Warriors Authorized Open the Brave Gate Championship. On August 6, Swann and Junction Three stablemate Gamma entered the 2011 Summer Adventure Tag League, but were eliminated in their first round match by Blood Warriors representatives Naruki Doi and Yasushi Kanda. During the tour, Swann also got to show his comedic side, first working under the ring name "Rich Ichikawa", and then as "Swann Hansen" in a match on November 5, where he defeated Stalker Ichikawa for the Open the Owarai Gate Championship, Dragon Gate's comedy wrestling title. In mid-November, Swann returned to the United States for a week to take part in Dragon Gate USA events. During the events, Swann, Chuck Taylor and Johnny Gargano began having problems with each other. On November 13 at Freedom Fight 2011, Swann earned a big win, when he pinned Blood Warriors member Akira Tozawa in a tag team match, where he and Chuck Taylor faced Tozawa and BxB Hulk. Six days later, Swann returned to Japan and Dragon Gate. The tour lasted until Dragon Gate's final event of 2011 on December 25, during which Swann and Junction Three stablemates Dragon Kid and Gamma unsuccessfully challenged Kzy, Naruki Doi and Naoki Tanizaki for the Open the Triangle Gate Championship. After the match, Tanizaki attacked Swann and stole his Open the Owarai Gate Championship belt, which was later vacated as a result. Swann returned to Dragon Gate in February 2012 and on February 9, took part in a fourteen-man tag team match, where Blood Warriors defeated Junction Three, which, as a result, was forced to disband. The following month, Swann aligned himself with the new World-1 International stable to oppose Mad Blankey, the former Blood Warriors taken over and renamed by Akira Tozawa. On March 29, Swann made another short return to the United States, taking part in a Dragon Gate USA and CZW co-promoted event, which saw Ronin being defeated by Mad Blankey representatives Akira Tozawa, BxB Hulk and Uhaa Nation in a three-way trios match, which also included the D.U.F. trio of Arik Cannon, Pinkie Sanchez and Sami Callihan. During the following day's Open the Ultimate Gate 2012 pay-per-view, Chuck Taylor turned on Johnny Gargano, effectively ending Ronin.

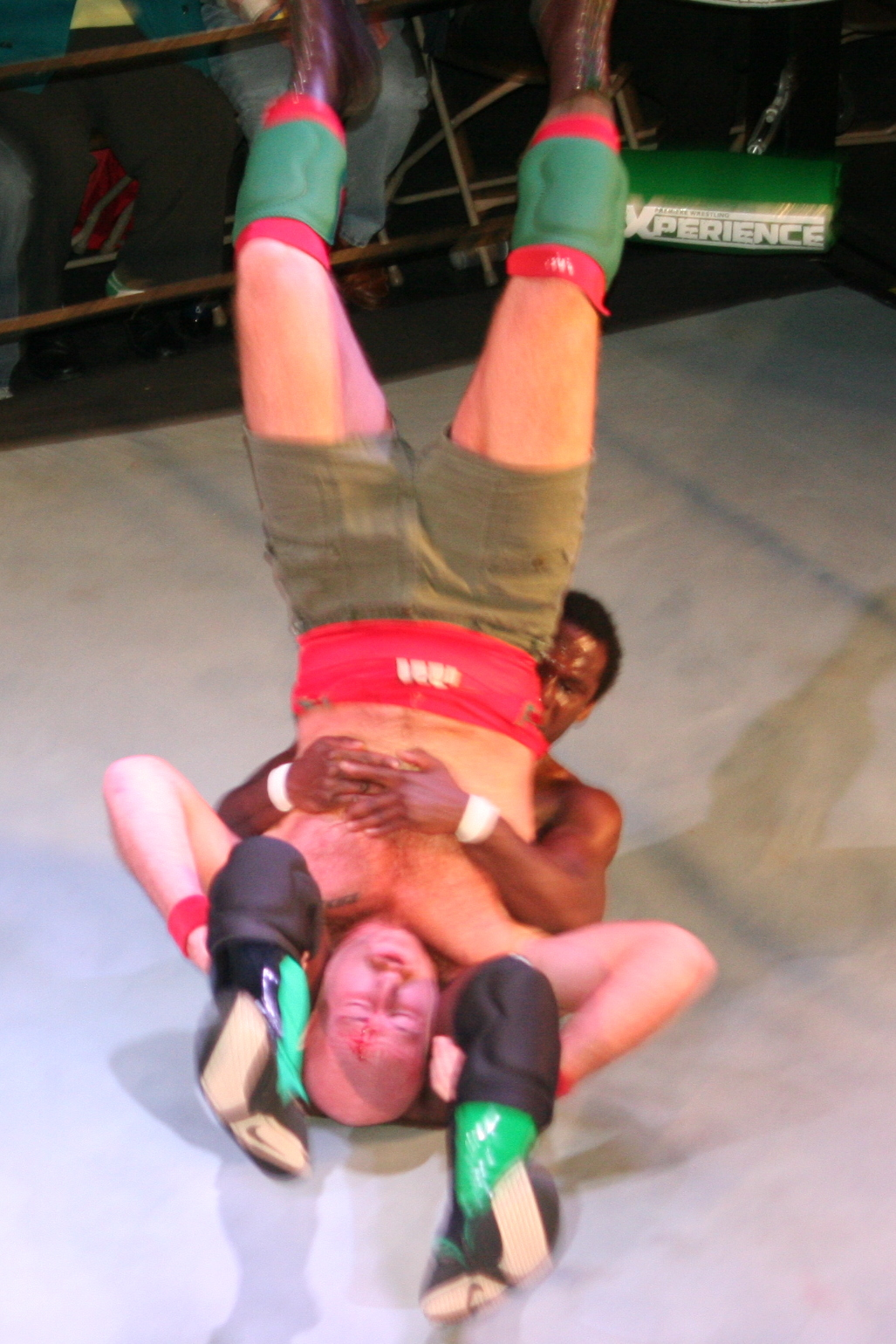
Swann performing a piledriver on Jake Manning

On March 31 at Mercury Rising 2012, Swann took part in a six-way "Chuck Taylor Invitational" match, which was won by El Generico. Later that same event, Swann saved Johnny Gargano from Chuck Taylor, chasing his former stablemate out of the arena. In April, Swann returned to Dragon Gate for another tour, during which he again made appearances as "Swann Hansen". On July 28, Swann defeated Chuck Taylor via disqualification in a Dragon Gate USA grudge match. The following day at Enter the Dragon 2012, Swann and World-1 International stablemate Ricochet were defeated by A. R. Fox and Cima in a match for the vacant Open the United Gate Championship. On November 2 at Fearless 2012, Swann pinned Chuck Taylor for the win in a six-man captain's fall tag team match, where he teamed with A. C. H. and Cima and Taylor with his new Gentleman's Club stablemates Drew Gulak and Orange Cassidy. Two days later at Freedom Fight 2012, Swann defeated Taylor in a No Disqualification match. On February 14, 2013, Swann returned to Dragon Gate, teaming with Masato Yoshino in a tag team match, where they defeated Jimmy Kagetora and Jimmy Kanda. On March 3, Swann teamed with World-1 International stablemates Naruki Doi and Shachihoko Boy to defeat the Jimmyz (Genki Horiguchi H.A.Gee.Mee!!, Mr. Kyu Kyu Naoki Tanizaki Toyonaka Dolphin and Ryo "Jimmy" Saito) for the Open the Triangle Gate Championship. On May 10, Swann entered his first King of Gate tournament, but was eliminated in his first round match by Genki Horiguchi H.A.Gee.Mee!!. On June 1, Swann received a shot at the Open the Brave Gate Championship, but was defeated by the defending champion, Masato Yoshino. On June 5, Swann, Doi and Shachihoko lost the Open the Triangle Gate Championship to M2K (Jimmy Susumu, K-Ness and Masaaki Mochizuki) in their second title defense. On July 28 at Enter the Dragon 2013, Dragon Gate USA's fourth anniversary event, Swann teamed up with his World-1 International stablemate Ricochet to unsuccessfully challenge The Young Bucks (Matt Jackson and Nick Jackson) for the Open the United Gate Championship. On September 22 at Evolve 24, Swann unsuccessfully challenged former Ronin stablemate Johnny Gargano for the Open the Freedom Gate Championship. The rivalry between Swann and Gargano culminated in an "Evolution's End" match on August 10, 2014, where Swann was victorious. Post-match, Swann was attacked by the Premier Athlete Brand of Anthony Nese, Caleb Konley and Su Yung, leading to Gargano returning to the ring and chasing the three away.

On September 13, Swann received his first shot at the Evolve Championship, but was defeated by the defending champion, Drew Galloway. On January 10, 2015, Swann, Chuck Taylor and Johnny Gargano reformed Ronin and defeated the Bravado Brothers (Harlem and Lancelot) and Moose in a match, where the losing team had to split up. On April 18, Swann and Gargano defeated Anthony Nese and Caleb Konley to win the Open the United Gate Championship. On May 30, Ronin successfully defended the title against Drew Gulak and Tracey Williams. After the match, Gargano announced they were retiring the Open the United Gate Championship since Dragon Gate was the past and demanded the creation of the Evolve Tag Team Championship. On August 15, Swann turned on Gargano, costing him his match against Ethan Page. Swann would defeat Gargano the next night after interference from Page.

=== Other promotions (2009–2015) ===
On November 6, 2009, Swann made his debut in his hometown for Maryland Championship Wrestling (MCW), unsuccessfully challenging Adam Carelle, later known as Adam Cole, for the MCW Rage Television Championship.

On November 21, 2009, Swann made his debut for Jersey All Pro Wrestling (JAPW), losing to his trainer D. J. Hyde. Swann made his second appearance for the promotion on March 20, 2010, when he unsuccessfully challenged Bandido Jr. for the JAPW Light Heavyweight Championship in a five-way match.

On January 16, 2010, Swann won his first professional wrestling title, defeating Lince Dorado to become the inaugural Real Championship Wrestling (RCW) Cruiserweight Champion. After one successful title defense against Skull, Swann lost the title to Steve Diaz in a three-way ladder match, which also included Skull, on June 5, 2010.

On April 24, 2010, Swann made his debut for the Chikara promotion, when he took part in the Rey de Voladores opening round four-way match, which was won by Ophidian and also included Cheech Hernandez and Frightmare. Swann returned to the promotion on February 19, 2011, when he unsuccessfully challenged Frightmare for the Chikara Young Lions Cup. On September 20, 2014, Swann returned to take part in the 2014 Rey de Voladores tournament, but was defeated by Shynron in a four-way match, also involving Chuck Taylor and Tigre Uno.

On November 7, 2010, Swann made his debut for the German Westside Xtreme Wrestling (wXw) promotion, teaming with Bernd Föhr, Greg Excellent and Zack Sabre Jr. in an eight-man tag team match, where they were defeated by Adam Cole, Blk Jeez, Drew Gulak and Karsten Beck.

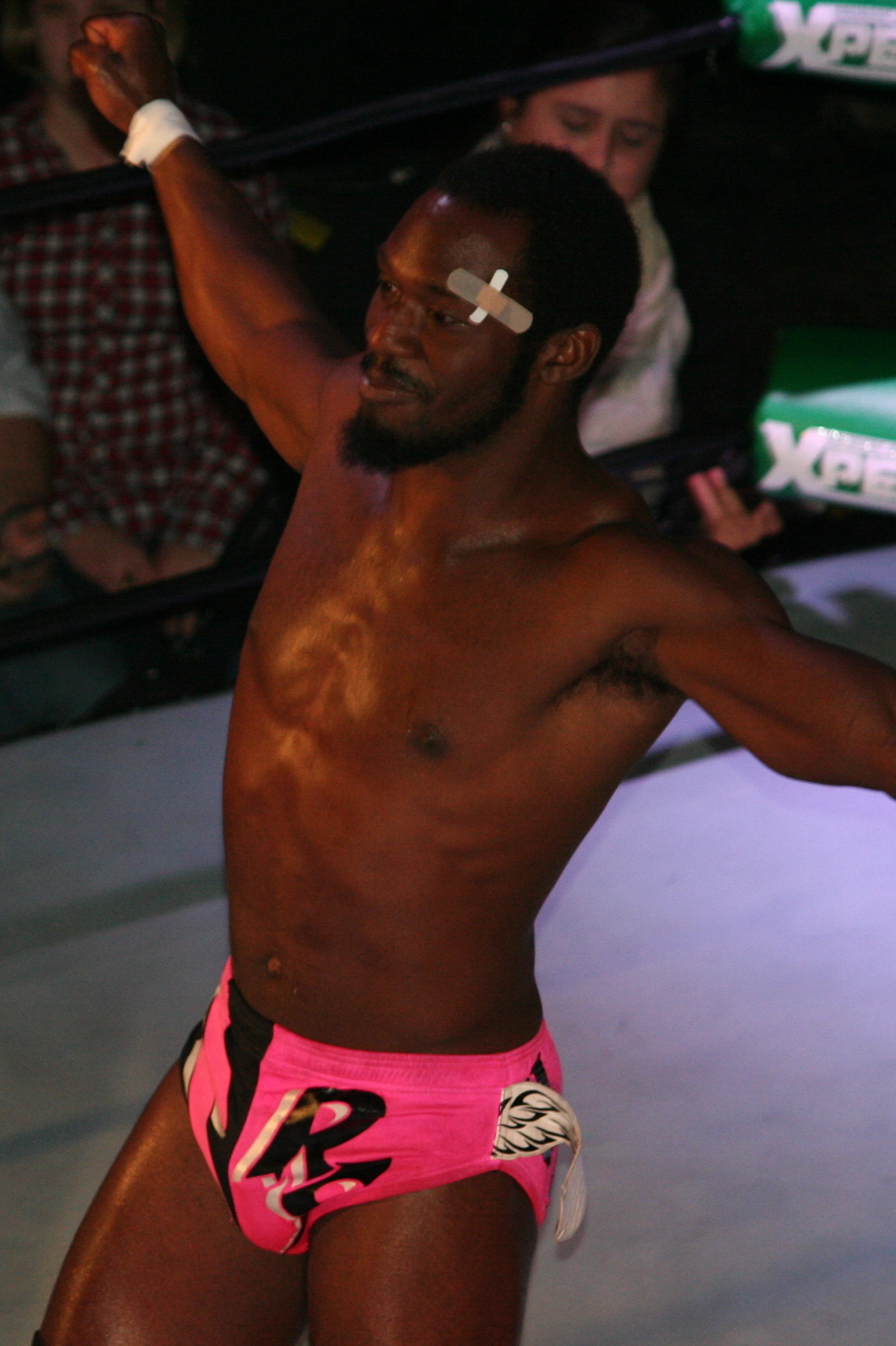
Swann in January 2014

On December 3, 2010, Swann made Full Impact Pro (FIP) debut, entering the 2010 Jeff Peterson Memorial Cup and defeating Grizzly Redwood in his first round match. The next day, he defeated Jigsaw to advance to the semifinals of the tournament, where he was defeated by Sami Callihan. Swann returned to FIP on October 11, 2013, when he unsuccessfully challenged Trent Barreta for the FIP World Heavyweight Championship. The next day, Swann's FIP Florida Heritage Championship match with Gran Akuma ended in a time limit draw. On December 6, Swann wrestled Roderick Strong in a match, which ended in a no contest, after the two were attacked by FIP Tag Team Champions, The Bravado Brothers (Harlem and Lancelot). This led to a tag team match, where Swann and Strong defeated The Bravado Brothers to become the new FIP Tag Team Champions. Next day, at Violence is the Answer, they retained the title against Andrew Everett and Caleb Konley. They lost the title to Juicy Product (David Starr and J. T. Dunn) on May 2, 2014. On November 14, during FIP's parent company WWNLive's tour of China, Swann defeated Trent Barreta for the FIP World Heavyweight Championship. He was stripped of the title due to an injury on February 20, 2015. Swann regained the title from Roderick Strong on April 18. He lost it to Caleb Konley on July 3.

On December 11, 2012, Swann made his Mexican debut for the Desastre Total Ultraviolento (DTU) promotion in a seven-way elimination match for the AAA Cruiserweight Championship. Swann was the last man eliminated by Daga, who, as a result, retained his title. On November 1, 2013, Swann won a six-way match for the Florida Underground Wrestling (FUW) Flash Championship. He lost the title to Jesus De Leon on September 26, 2014. On March 15, 2014, The Inner City Machine Guns made an appearance for English promotion Revolution Pro Wrestling (RPW), defeating The Swords of Essex (Paul Robinson and Will Ospreay) to win the Undisputed British Tag Team Championship.

=== Pro Wrestling Guerrilla (2012–2015) ===
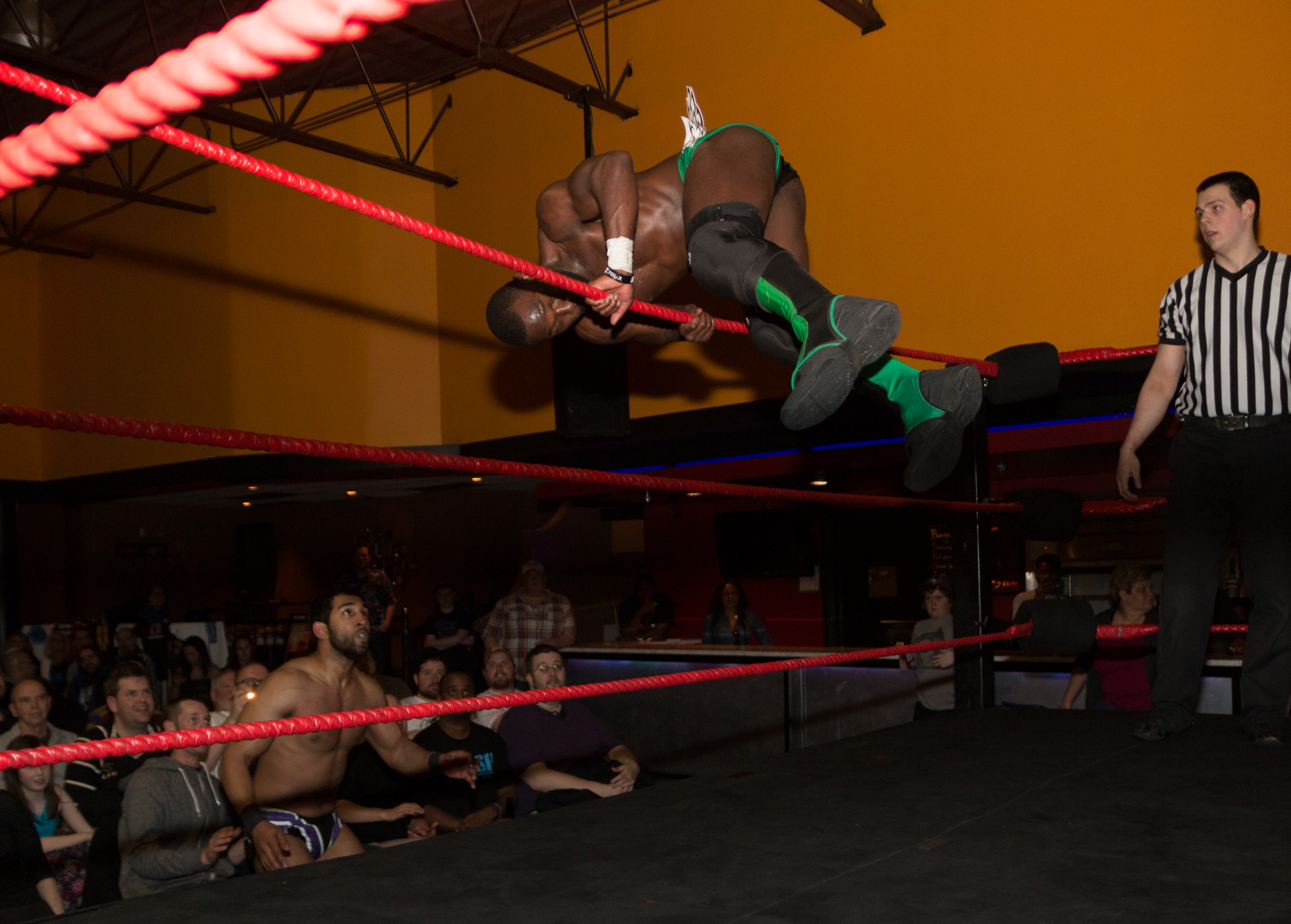
Swann diving over the top rope onto Alex Vega

On October 27, 2012, Swann made his debut for Pro Wrestling Guerrilla (PWG), losing to Roderick Strong. In his second appearance for the promotion on December 1, Swann was defeated by El Generico.

On January 12, 2013, Swann teamed up with Ricochet for the 2013 Dynamite Duumvirate Tag Team Title Tournament. The team, dubbed "The Inner City Machine Guns", was eliminated in their first round match by The Young Bucks (Matt Jackson and Nick Jackson). The Inner City Machine Guns returned to take part in PWG's All Star Weekend 9, defeating the team of A. R. Fox and Samuray del Sol during the first night on March 22. During the second night, they teamed with Fox in a six-man tag team match, where they were defeated by Brian Cage, Kevin Steen and Michael Elgin. On August 9 at PWG's tenth anniversary event, the Inner City Machine Guns unsuccessfully challenged The Young Bucks for the PWG World Tag Team Championship in a three-way ladder match, which also included the DojoBros (Eddie Edwards and Roderick Strong). Swann returned to PWG on August 30 to take part in the 2013 Battle of Los Angeles, but was eliminated from the tournament in his first round match by Michael Elgin. On January 31, 2014, the Inner City Machine Guns made it to the finals of the 2014 Dynamite Duumvirate Tag Team Title Tournament, before losing to the Best Friends (Chuck Taylor and Trent?). In the following year's tournament, the Inner City Machine Guns defeated Biff Busick and Drew Gulak in the first round, before falling to eventual tournament winners Andrew Everett and Trevor Lee in the semifinals.

Swann then entered his third consecutive Battle of Los Angeles on August 29, 2015, but was defeated in the first round by Marty Scurll. The following day, he teamed with Ricochet, Angélico and Fénix in an eight-man tag team match, where they were defeated by Mount Rushmore 2.0 (Roderick Strong, Super Dragon and The Young Bucks). This turned out to be Swann's final appearance for PWG before signing with WWE.

=== WWE (2015–2018) ===
==== NXT (2015–2016) ====
Following an Evolve show in 2014, rapper Wale sent out a tweet, stating that Swann and Uhaa Nation needed to be in WWE, calling them "the future of the business". This got the attention of Mark Henry, who arranged a WWE tryout for Swann in September 2014. A year later, it was reported that Swann had signed a developmental contract with the promotion and would be reporting to its developmental branch NXT the following month. WWE officially announced Swann's signing to NXT on October 28. Swann made his debut at an NXT house show on October 30, wrestling in a Halloween battle royal, which was won by Bayley. Swann made his singles match debut at a house show on November 20, losing to Riddick Moss. He made his first televised appearance on the January 20, 2016, episode of NXT, losing to Baron Corbin. On the March 23 episode of NXT, Swann was defeated by NXT Champion Finn Bálor. On October 13, Swann and No Way Jose entered the 2016 Dusty Rhodes Tag Team Classic, defeating Drew Gulak and Tony Nese in their first round match. They were eliminated from the tournament on October 28 by The Authors of Pain (Akam and Rezar).

==== Cruiserweight Champion (2016–2018) ====
On June 13, 2016, Swann was announced as a participant in the upcoming Cruiserweight Classic tournament. The tournament began on June 23 with Swann defeating Jason Lee in his first round match. On July 14, Swann defeated Lince Dorado in his second round match. On August 26, Swann was eliminated from the tournament in the quarterfinals by eventual winner T. J. Perkins.

On the August 22 episode of Raw, Swann was announced as part of the upcoming cruiserweight division. Swann made his Raw debut on September 19, wrestling in a four-way match won by Brian Kendrick and also included Cedric Alexander and Gran Metalik. On the November 21 Raw, Swann defeated Noam Dar and T. J. Perkins to become the #1 contender to the WWE Cruiserweight Championship. On November 29, Swann defeated Brian Kendrick on the premiere episode of 205 Live to win the title. The following week, Swann defeated Kendrick in a rematch to retain the title, following a distraction from Perkins. On December 18 at Roadblock: End of the Line, Swann retained the title in a triple threat match against Kendrick and Perkins. After the match, Swann and Perkins were attacked by a returning Neville. On January 29, 2017, Swann lost the Cruiserweight Championship to Neville at Royal Rumble. After recovering from a minor injury, Swann received his title rematch against Neville on the March 6 Raw, but again lost.

On December 10, 2017, following his arrest, WWE suspended Swann indefinitely for violating the company's zero tolerance policy against domestic violence. He was originally scheduled to face Drew Gulak in a match to determine the number one contender to the Cruiserweight Championship, (which was then held by Enzo Amore), the following night on Raw, but the match was cancelled in light of his domestic violence arrest. On February 15, 2018, WWE officially announced that Swann and WWE had mutually agreed on his release.

=== Independent circuit (2018–present) ===
Following his release from the WWE, Swann's return to the independent circuit was confirmed for Mexican promotion The Crash Lucha Libre on March 17 in Tijuana, Mexico. He was also announced to be making appearances for both the House of Hardcore promotion and the United Kingdom's Southside Wrestling Entertainment. On April 14, Swann made a surprise return to CZW, announcing himself as the final participant in Best of the Best 17. Due to Impact Wrestling's and Major League Wrestling's partnerships with AAA, Swann appeared at Triplemanía XXVI to fight Brian Cage, Jeff Jarrett and Fenix.

=== Major League Wrestling (2018–2019) ===
On June 2, 2018, Swann made his debut in Major League Wrestling (MLW) defeating Kotto Brazil. On June 30, he was defeated by ACH, following that he began teaming with ACH on the program. On July 7, Swann and ACH defeated Team Filthy (Simon Gotch and Tom Lawlor). The two would then feud with the Hart Foundation (Brian Pillman Jr., Teddy Hart and Davey Boy Smith Jr.) but would be defeated on each encounter. On August 25, ACH and Swann faced the Lucha Bros. for the MLW Tag Team Championships in a losing effort. ACH would stop appearing for the promotion in September 2018, putting an end to their tag team. On December 15, Swann would return to being a singles competitor losing to Rush. On January 12, 2019, Swann was defeated by Dragon Lee, in a match where he wrestled as a heel. However at the end of the match he shook Lee's hand. On February 17, Swann would lose to the debuting Ace Austin. After the match, Swann would attack the referee, commentator Rich Bocchini and the ring announcer cementing his heel turn in the process. The following week he defeated Lance Anoa'i in a singles match.

=== Impact Wrestling / Total Nonstop Action Wrestling (2018–present) ===
==== Impact X Division Champion (2018–2019) ====
Swann made his debut for Impact Wrestling on June 21, 2018, defeating Trevor Lee. It would be later revealed he signed a multi-year deal with the company. On the July 5 episode of Impact, Swann lost to Fénix. On the July 12 episode of Impact, Swann and The Lucha Bros (Fénix and Pentagón Jr.) lost to Ohio Versus Everything (Dave Crist, Jake Crist and Sami Callihan). On the September 20 episode of Impact, Swann and Matt Sydal lost to The Lucha Bros.

On the October 4 episode of Impact, Swann lost to Sydal after interference from the debuting Ethan Page. On the October 11 episode of Impact, Swann revealed Willie Mack would be his tag team partner at Bound for Glory, where they defeated Sydal and Page. On the October 18 episode of Impact, Swann lost to Brian Cage in an X Division Championship match. On the November 29 episode of Impact, Swann and Mack lost to The Lucha Bros.

On the December 13 episode of Impact, Swann defeated Dave Crist in an Ultimate X Qualifier. At Homecoming, Swann defeated Ethan Page, Jake Crist and Trey Miguel in an Ultimate X match to win the vacant Impact X Division Championship. On the January 25 episode of Impact, Swann defeated Hijo Del Vikingo; after the match, Sami Callihan offered Swann a spot in his faction OVE, but Swann declined. On the February 8 episode of Impact, Swann was attacked by Callihan and was thrown off the ramp through a table. On the March 8 episode of Impact, OVE made a last ditch effort to recruit Swann to the group, but he attacked them instead. On the March 22 episode of Impact, Swann defeated Callihan to retain the X Division Championship. At United We Stand, Swann defeated Flamita to retain the X Division Championship. At Impact Wrestling Rebellion, Swann defeated Callihan in an oVe Rules match to retain the X Division Championship. At Slammiversary XVII, Swann defeated Johnny Impact to retain the X Division Championship. Swann lost the championship to Jake Crist on the July 19 tapings of Impact, ending his reign at 194 days. This episode aired on tape delay on July 26. At Unbreakable, Swann and Willie Mack competed in a three-way tag team match for the Impact World Tag Team Championship, which was won by The North. At Prelude to Glory, Swann and Mack defeated The Desi Hit Squad (Mahabali Shera and Rohit Raju). At Bound for Glory, Swann and Mack competed in another three-way tag team match for the Impact World Tag Team Championship, which was again won by The North. At Turning Point, Swann and Mack unsuccessfully challenged The North for the Impact World Tag Team Championship.

At No Surrender, Swann received a shot at the Impact World Championship, but lost to Sami Callihan. At Bash at the Brewery 2, Swann, Mack, Tessa Blanchard and Brian Cage lost to Ohio Versus Everything in an eight-person elimination tag team match where he suffered a knee injury, and underwent surgery that sidelined him for several months.

==== Impact World Champion (2020–2021) ====
Swann made his return from injury in the main event of Slammiversary on July 18, 2020, competing in an elimination match for the Impact World Championship, eliminating Eric Young, who attacked Swann and re-injured his knee with a steel chair. On the August 4 episode of Impact!, Swann announced his (kayfabe) retirement from wrestling due to the injury. As Swann was exiting the arena, he was once again attacked by Young. Swann returned on the September 1 episode of Impact!, where he attacked Young after winning the Impact World Championship. The following week on Impact!, Swann announced that he had been medically cleared to compete and challenged Young for the Impact World Championship at Bound for Glory which Young accepted. At the event, Swann defeated Young to win the Impact World Championship for the first time. On the October 27 episode of Impact!, Swann made his first successful title defense in a rematch against Young. He then successfully defended the title against Sami Callihan at Turning Point and Chris Bey at Final Resolution.

Swann would then begin a feud with the AEW World Champion Kenny Omega after Swann was denied permission to leave the arena due to Omega's arrival on the December 8 episode of Impact!. This led to a six-man tag team match where Swann teamed with Chris Sabin and Moose against Omega and The Good Brothers (Karl Anderson and Luke Gallows) in a losing effort at Hard To Kill on January 16, 2021. At No Surrender, Swann retained the Impact World Championship against Tommy Dreamer during the latter's fiftieth birthday. On the February 23 episode of Impact!, Swann saved Jake Something during a post-match beat down from Moose. On the same episode, Scott D'Amore announced a unification match for the Impact World Championship and the TNA World Heavyweight Championship between Moose and Swann for Sacrifice and the winner would face AEW World Champion Kenny Omega at Rebellion in a title vs title match. At Sacrifice, Swann defeated Moose to unify the Impact World Championship and the TNA World Heavyweight Championship. At Rebellion, Omega defeated Swann, ending his reign as Impact World Champion.

==== Championship reign and pursuits (2021–2024) ====
At Under Siege, Swann returned to save Willie Mack from getting beat down by W. Morrissey. He went on to face Morrissey at Against All Odds in a losing effort. Swann reteamed with Mack to go after the Impact World Tag Team Championship, but failed to get them from The Good Brothers (Doc Gallows and Karl Anderson) in multi team matches at Slammiversary and Emergence, and a regular tag team match at Victory Road. At Bound for Glory, Swann competed in the Call Your Shot Gauntlet match, where the winner could choose any championship match of their choice, but was eliminated by eventual winner Moose and W. Morrisey. At Turning Point, Swann defeated VSK. On January 8, 2022, at Hard To Kill, Swann took part in a 10-man Hardcore War against The Good Brothers and Violent By Design in a winning effort. At No Surrender, he joined Team Impact in another 10-man tag team match against Honor No More, but failed to win after Eddie Edwards turned on them. On the Countdown To Sacrifice pre-show, Swann teamed with Mack to defeat Honor No More's Matt Taven and Mike Bennett. At Multiverse of Matches, he competed in an Ultimate X match for the X Division Championship, which was won by Trey Miguel. At Rebellion, Swann and Mack failed to capture the Impact Tag Team Championship in an Eight-Team Elimination Challenge.

On May 28, Swann defeated Matt Cardona at the Vegas Vacation event held by The Wrestling Revolver to win the Impact Digital Media Championship for the first time. Afterwards, Cardona refused to give up the title, attacked Swann after the match, and made it off with the title belt. On the June 9 episode of Impact!, Cardona appeared on a Zoom call with tag team partner Brian Myers, "relinquishing" the title to the latter after suffering a torn bicep. Myers challenged Swann to a Digital Media Championship match at Slammiversary to determine the "real" champion, where Swann defeated Myers to retain the title. At Against All Odds, Swann lost the title to Myers in a Dot Combat match, ending his reign at 35 days. On the August 18 episode of Impact!, Swann competed in a six-way elimination match to determine the number one contender to Josh Alexander's Impact World Championship at Bound for Glory, which was won by Eddie Edwards. At Victory Road, Swann teamed with Heath and Alexander in a six-man tag match against Honor No More, which they lost. At Bound for Glory, Swann competed in the Call Your Shot Gauntlet, eliminating Eric Young but was eliminated by Steve Maclin. On the Countdown to Over Drive pre-show, Swann won a six-way match.

On January 13, 2023, at Hard To Kill, Swann lost to Steve Maclin in a Falls Count Anywhere match. On the January 26 episode of Impact!, Swann won the "Golden Six-Shooter" six-way elimination match to earn an Impact World Championship match against Josh Alexander at No Surrender. At the event, Swann failed to beat Alexander for the title. On March 24 at Sacrifice, Swann teamed with Steve Maclin and Frankie Kazarian losing to Time Machine (Alex Shelley, Chris Sabin, and Kushida). On May 26 at Under Siege, Swann teamed with Ohio Versus Everything (Sami Callihan and Jake Crist) defeating The Design (Deaner, Angels, and Kon) in a six-man tag team match. On June 9 at Against All Odds, Swann competed in the 8-4-1 match to determine the number one contender for the Impact World Championship, which was won by Nick Aldis.

On January 13, Swann would compete in the first match of the newly rebranded TNA, in a loss to Steve Maclin at Hard To Kill.

==== Fir$t Cla$$ (2024–2026) ====
On the March 14, 2024 episode of Impact, Swann attacked Joe Hendry and turned heel, aligning with AJ Francis with the duo dubbed as Fir$t Cla$$. On April 20 at Rebellion, Swann defeated Hendry. At Under Siege, Swann defeated Jake Something. At Against All Odds, Swann lost to PCO. On the June 20 episode of TNA Impact!, Swann lost to Nic Nemeth. At Slammiversary, Swann lost to Kushida. On the August 9 episode of Xplosion, Fir$t Cla$$ (Swann and AJ Francis) defeated Rhino and Sami Callihan. On August 21, it was reported that TNA suspended Swann after his arrest for disorderly intoxication and entered into rehab.

On April 14, 2025, It was reported that Swann had left TNA following the expiration of his contract with the promotion. During the July 25 tapings of iMPACT!, Swann made his return and rejoined Fir$t Cla$$. On October 12 at Bound for Glory, Swann competed in the 22-person Intergender Call Your Shot Gauntlet, being eliminated by fellow Fir$t Cla$$ member A. J. Francis. At Final Resolution on December 5, 2025, Swann turned on Francis and aided Leon Slater in retaining the TNA X Division Championship, thus turning face and disbanding Fir$t Cla$$ in the process. On January 17, 2026, at Genesis, Swann lost to Francis. Twelve days later on Impact!, Swann defeated Francis in a No Holds Barred match. At Slammiversary, Swann competed in a Triple threat match for the TNA International Championship which was won by Mustafa Ali. At Lockdown, Swann and BDE lost to The Righteous (Vincent and Dutch).

On the September 17 episode of Impact, Swann defeated LJ Cleary to qualify for the X-Division Championship match at Bound for Glory. At Bound for Glory, Swann failed to win the title.

== Professional wrestling style and persona ==
Swann has formerly utilized a standing 450° splash as his finisher up to 2016, and currently uses a Phoenix splash from the middle or top rope. During his tenure in WWE, Swann had almost been given the name Silk Morris.

== Other media ==
Swann made his first and only appearance as a playable character in the video game WWE 2K18.

== Personal life ==
Swann married his girlfriend of five years, Vannarah Riggs, a fellow professional wrestler better known as Su Yung, in March 2017. On December 30, 2021, Riggs announced that she was pregnant with the couple's first child. Their son was born in February 2022.

=== Legal issues ===
Swann arrested in 2017

On December 10, 2017, Swann was arrested in Gainesville, Florida, on charges of battery and kidnapping/false imprisonment. The victim was identified as his wife. According to the arrest report, Swann and Riggs had gotten into an argument over Swann criticizing Riggs' performance at a show that night. When Riggs tried to get away from Swann, witnesses state that he grabbed her in a headlock and dragged her back into his car. Swann was released from Alachua County Jail later that same day and told to get in contact with court services. On January 25, 2018, all charges against Swann were dismissed, when a determination was made by prosecutors that there was "insufficient evidence" to move forward with the case.

On August 21, 2024, Swann was reported to be entering rehab following his second arrest for disorderly intoxication since 2022. This latest arrest is part of ongoing legal and personal challenges he has faced in recent years.

== Championships and accomplishments ==
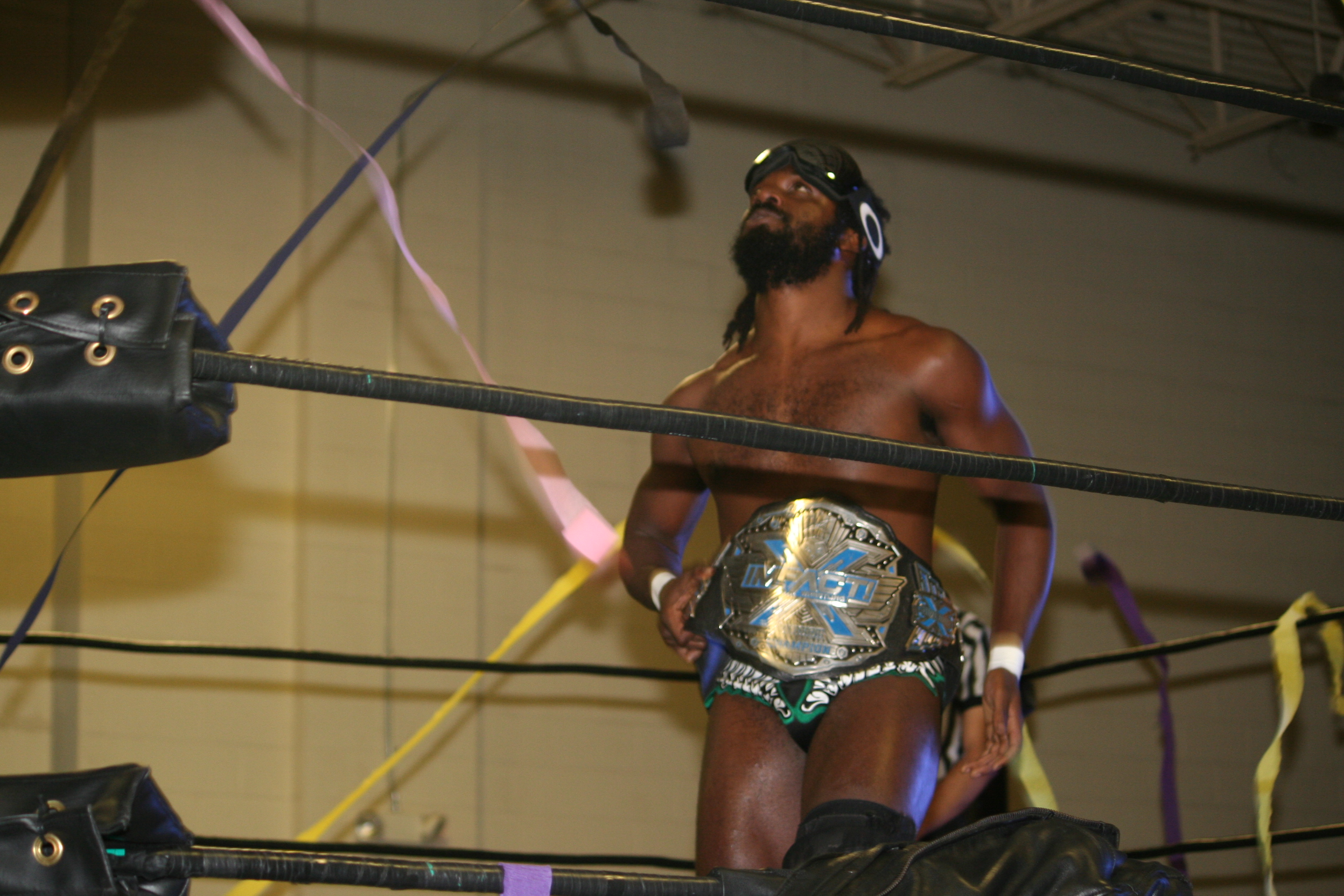
Swann is a former X Division Champion.

- Adrenaline Championship Wrestling
  - King Of Maryland Tournament (2021)
- Combat Zone Wrestling
  - CZW World Heavyweight Championship (1 time)
- Dragon Gate
  - Open the Owarai Gate Championship (1 time)
  - Open the Triangle Gate Championship (1 time) – with Naruki Doi and Shachihoko Boy
- Evolve Wrestling
  - Open the United Gate Championship (1 time) – with Johnny Gargano
- Fight Factory Pro Wrestling
  - Irish Tag Team Championship (1 time) - with LJ Cleary
- Full Impact Pro
  - FIP World Heavyweight Championship (2 times)
  - FIP Tag Team Championship (2 times) – with Roderick Strong (1) and LJ Cleary (1)
  - Florida Rumble (2014) – with Caleb Konley
- Impact Wrestling
  - Impact World Championship (1 time)
  - TNA World Heavyweight Championship (1 time, final)
  - Impact X Division Championship (1 time)
  - Impact Digital Media Championship (1 time)
  - Impact Year End Awards (2 times)
    - X Division Star of the Year (2019)
    - Match of the Year (2020) vs. Eddie Edwards vs. Ace Austin vs. Trey vs. Eric Young at Slammiversary
- Insane Wrestling Revolution
  - IWR United States Championship (1 time)
- Next Generation Wrestling
  - NGW Championship (1 time)
- NWA Florida Underground Wrestling/NWA Signature Pro
  - FUW Flash Championship (1 time)
- Pro Wrestling Illustrated
  - Ranked No. 10 of the top 500 singles wrestlers in the PWI 500 in 2021
- Real Championship Wrestling
  - RCW Cruiserweight Championship (1 time)
- Revolution Pro Wrestling
  - Undisputed British Tag Team Championship (1 time) – with Ricochet
- SoCal Uncensored
  - Match of the Year (2013) with Ricochet vs. DojoBros (Eddie Edwards and Roderick Strong) and The Young Bucks (Matt Jackson and Nick Jackson) on August 9
- The Wrestling Revolver
  - Revolver World Championship (1 time)
  - Open Invite Scramble Championship (1 time)
  - Revolver World Tag Team Championship (Note: During his first reign, the title was called the Revolver Tag Team Championship.) (2 times, current) – with Jason Cade (1), Jake Crist and Trey Miguel (1, current)
  - Jerry Lynn Invitational (2025)
- WWE
  - WWE Cruiserweight Championship (1 time)
