= DGUSA Fearless =

Pro-wrestling Series

Fearless is a series of professional wrestling pay-per-view (PPV) events produced by Dragon Gate USA.

== Background ==
Fearless featured eight professional wrestling matches that involved different wrestlers from pre-existing scripted feuds and storylines. Wrestlers were portrayed as either villains or heroes in the scripted events that built tension and culminated into a wrestling match or series of matches.

At the 2010 event, Dragon Kid received a title shot against BxB Hulk, the inaugural Open the Freedom Gate Champion who won a 14-man tournament for the belt at DGUSA Freedom Fight.

== Results ==
=== 2010 ===
Fearless 2010
- Promotion: Dragon Gate USA
- Date: January 23, 2010 (aired March 5, 2010)
- City: Chicago, Illinois
- Venue: Congress Theater

Pay-per-view chronology
← Previous; Freedom Fight 2010	Next → Mercury Rising 2010

Fearless chronology
← Previous —	Next → Fearless 2011

#	Matches	Stipulations
Dark	Jon Moxley defeated Darin Corbin	Singles match
Dark	Kyle O'Reilly defeated Arik Cannon, Lince Dorado, Johnny Gargano, Jon Moxley and Brad Allen	Six-Way elimination match
Dark	Silas Young (c) defeated Hallowicked	Singles match for the AAW Championship
1	Mike Quackenbush and Jigsaw defeated Cima and Super Crazy	Tag team match
2	TJP defeated Gran Akuma	Singles match
3	Brian Kendrick (with Lacey) defeated Jimmy Jacobs	Singles match
4	Davey Richards (with Kyle O´Reilly) defeated Masaaki Mochizuki (c)	Singles match for the FIP World Heavyweight Championship
5	Speed Muscle (Naruki Doi and Masato Yoshino) defeated Shingo and Yamato and The Young Bucks (Nick and Matt Jackson)	3-way elimination tag team match
6	BxB Hulk (c) defeated Dragon Kid (with Cima)	Singles match for the DGUSA Open the Freedom Gate Championship

=== 2011 ===
Fearless 2011
- Promotion: Dragon Gate USA
- Date: June 3, 2011 (aired June 3, 2011)
- City: Revere, Massachusetts
- Venue: Wonderland Ballroom

Pay-per-view chronology
← Previous; Open The Ultimate Gate 2011	Next → Uprising 2011

Fearless chronology
← Previous; Fearless 2010	Next → —

#	Matches	Stipulations
1	CIMA defeated Rich Swann	Singles match
2	Arik Cannon defeated Alex Colon, Brodie Lee, A. R. Fox, Tony Nese, Scott Reed	Six-Way Scramble match
3	Susumu Yokosuka defeated Ricochet	Singles match
4	Masaaki Mochizuki defeated Sami Callihan	Singles match
5	Jon Davis defeated Pinkie Sanchez	Singles match
6	Austin Aries defeated Johnny Gargano	Singles match
7	PAC & Masato Yoshino defeated YAMATO & Akira Tozawa	Open the United Gate Championship match
