= DGUSA United: NYC =

2011 Dragon Gater USA pay-per-view event

United: NYC 2011
- Promotion: Dragon Gate USA
- Date: January 28, 2011
- City: New York, New York
- Attendance: 812

United: NYC was a professional wrestling pay-per-view (PPV) event produced by Dragon Gate USA that was second live Internet pay-per-view. It took place on January 28, 2011 at B.B. King's Blues Club & Grill in New York, New York.

| No. | Results | Stipulations | Times |
|---|---|---|---|
| 1 | Akira Tozawa defeated Sami Callihan | Special Attraction match | 12:06 |
| 2 | Jon Moxley defeated Jigsaw | Grudge match | 6:31 |
| 3 | Yamato defeated BxB Hulk (c) | Open the Freedom Gate Championship Match | 21:40 |
| 4 | Brodie Lee defeated Jimmy Jacobs | Special Challenge Match | 6:16 |
| 5 | Ronin (Chuck Taylor and Johnny Gargano) defeated Blood Warriors (Naruki Doi and Ricochet) | Open the United Gate Championship Tournament Round 1 | 16:11 |
| 6 | Austin Aries defeated Rich Swann | Grudge match | 16:52 |
| 7 | Masato Yoshino and PAC defeated CIMA and Dragon Kid | Open the United Gate Championship Tournament Round 1 | 20:21 |
(c) / – the champion(s) heading into the match
