= Bushido: Code of the Warrior =

Bushido: Code of the Warrior was a professional wrestling pay-per-view (PPV) event produced by Dragon Gate USA that was first ever live Internet pay-per-view.

== Results ==
=== 2010 ===
Bushido: Code of the Warrior 2010
- Promotion: Dragon Gate USA
- Date: October 29, 2010 (aired October 29, 2010)
- City: Fall River, Massachusetts
- Venue: PAL Hall

Pay-per-view chronology
← Previous; Way Of The Ronin 2010	Next → Freedom Fight 2011

Bushido: Code Of The Warrior chronology
← Previous —	Next → Bushido 2011: Code Of The Warrior

#	Matches	Stipulations
Dark	Sami Callihan defeated Tommaso Ciampa, Rip Impact, Silas Young, Cheech, Shane Smalls, and Caleb Konley	FRAY!
Dark	Brandon Webb & Matt Taven d Scott Reed & Guy Alexander	Tag Team match
Dark	Vinny Marseglia defeated Ryan Waters	Singles match
1	Chuck Taylor defeated Johnny Gargano, Arik Cannon, Ricochet	Four Way Freestyle match
2	Homicide defeated Rich Swann	Singles match
3	Masato Yoshino defeated Austin Aries	Singles match
4	Jimmy Jacobs defeated Jon Moxley	I Quit Match
5	Akebono & Brodie Lee vs The Osirian Portal (Amasis & Ophidian)	Tag Team match
6	CIMA & Genki Horiguchi defeated YAMATO & Akira Tozawa	Tag Team Match
7	BxB Hulk defeated Shingo	Open The Freedom Gate Championship
