= Orange =

Orange most often refers to:

- Orange (fruit), the fruit of the tree species Citrus × sinensis
  - Orange blossom, its fragrant flower
  - Orange juice
- Orange (colour), the color of an orange fruit, occurs between red and yellow in the visible light spectrum
- Some other citrus or citrus-like fruit, see list of plants known as orange
- Orange (word), both a noun and an adjective in the English language

Orange may also refer to:

== Arts, entertainment, and media ==
=== Films ===
- Game of Life (film), 2007, originally known as Oranges
- Orange (2010 film), a Telugu-language film
- The Oranges (film), a 2011 American romantic comedy starring Hugh Laurie
- Orange (2012 film), a Malayalam-language film
- Orange (2015 film), a Japanese film
- Orange (2018 film), a Kannada-language film

=== Music ===
==== Groups and labels ====
- Orange (band), an American punk rock band, who formed in 2002 from California
- Orange Record Label, a Canadian independent record label, founded 2003

==== Albums ====
- Orange (Al Stewart album), a 1972 folk album
- Orange (Jon Spencer Blues Explosion album), a 1994 alternative rock album
- Orange (Watanabe Misato album), a 2003 J-pop album
- Orange (Mario Pavone album), a 2003 jazz album
- Orange (2010 soundtrack), from the Telugu romantic film of the same name
- Orange (Dark Suns album), a 2011 studio album

==== Songs ====
- "Orange" (song), a 2007 comedy rock song by David O'Doherty
- "L'Orange" (song), a 1964 pop song by Gilbert Bécaud
- "Orange", by Love Battery on the 1990 album Between the Eyes
- "Orange", by Art Alexakis on the 2019 album Sun Songs
- "Orange", by Pinegrove on the 2022 album 11:11
- "Orange", by Gen Hoshino and Masayasu Wakabayashi on the 2023 EP Lighthouse

=== Other uses in arts, entertainment, and media ===
- Oranges, a 1967 short book by John McPhee
- Orange (TV channel), a former name of New Zealand channel Sky 5, launched in 1994
- Orange, a character in the 2009 web series Annoying Orange
- Orange (manga), a 2012 series

== Businesses ==
- Orange (animation studio), a Japanese 3DCG animation company
- Orange Music Electronic Company, a British amplifier maker
- Orange Group, a French multinational telecommunications company which owns multiple international operators including mobile, landline, and internet services, including:
  - Orange (India)
  - Orange Belgium
  - Orange Egypt
  - Orange España (Spain)
  - Orange Jordan
  - Orange Morocco
  - Orange Polska (Poland)
  - Orange Romania
  - Orange Slovensko (Slovakia)
  - Orange RDC (Democratic Republic of the Congo)
  - Orange Tunisia
  - Orange UK

== People with the name ==
- Orange (name), a surname and given name
- James O'Meara (1919–1974), Royal Air Force Second World War flying ace, nicknamed Orange

== Places ==
=== Historic ===
- Orange Free State, a 19th-century Boer republic; later a province of South Africa
- Principality of Orange (1163–1713), a feudal state in what is now France

=== Australia ===
- Orange, New South Wales, a city
- City of Orange (New South Wales), a local government area based in the city
- Electoral district of Orange, a district in the New South Wales Legislative Assembly
- Orange wine region, a registered Australian Geographical Indication

=== France ===
- Orange (ski resort), a village and resort in the commune of Saint-Sixt
- Orange, Vaucluse, a commune in the Vaucluse department in the Provence-Alpes-Côte d'Azur region
- Canton of Orange, an administrative division of the Vaucluse department

=== United States ===
- Orange, California, a city
- Orange, Connecticut, a town
- Orange, Georgia, an unincorporated community
- Orange, Indiana, an unincorporated community
- Orange, Massachusetts, a town
  - Orange (CDP), Massachusetts, a census-designated place in the town
- Orange, Missouri, an unincorporated community
- Orange, New Hampshire, a town
- The Oranges, four municipalities in Essex County, New Jersey, which have "Orange" in their name
- Orange, New Jersey, a township
- Orange, New York, a town
- Orange, North Dakota or Arvilla, an unincorporated community
- Orange, Ohio, a village in Cuyahoga County
- Orange, Coshocton County, Ohio, an unincorporated community
- Orange, Delaware County, Ohio, an unincorporated community
- Orange, Texas, a city
- Orange, Vermont, a town
- Orange, Virginia, a town
- Orange, Wisconsin, a town
- Orange Creek, Florida
- Orange Island (Florida), a prehistoric landmass

=== Multiple entries ===
- Orange Bay (disambiguation)
- Orange City (disambiguation)
- Orange County (disambiguation)
- Orange Lake (disambiguation)
- Orange Park (disambiguation)
- Orange River (disambiguation)
- Orange Township (disambiguation)

=== Elsewhere ===
- Cape Orange, on the coast of Brazil
- Jayawijaya Mountains, a mountain range in the Indonesian part of New Guinea, formerly known as the Orange Range
- Orange Isle, Xiang River, Changsha, Hunan

== Sports ==
- Netherlands national football team, nicknamed "Orange"
- Syracuse Orange ("the Orange"; formerly, the Orangemen), the athletic teams of Syracuse University
  - Otto the Orange, the team mascot

== Transportation ==
=== Train stations ===
- Orange railway station, New South Wales, in Orange, New South Wales, Australia
- Orange station (California), in Orange, California, US
- Orange station (NJ Transit), a New Jersey Transit station in Orange, New Jersey, US
- Orange station (Vaucluse), an SNCF station in Vaucluse, Provence-Alpes-Côte d'Azur, France

=== Vessels ===
- Gitana 13, an ocean racing catamaran named Orange in 2002
- HMS Orange, two Royal Navy ships
- Orange II (boat), an ocean racing catamaran
- USS Orange (PF-43), a World War II frigate

=== Lines ===
- Orange Line (disambiguation)

== Other uses ==
- Orange (heraldry), a tincture used in heraldry
- Orange (software), a data analysis software suite
- House of Orange-Nassau, a European aristocratic dynasty
- Orange High School (disambiguation)
- Orange Order, a Protestant organization
- Orange Revolution, which occurred in Ukraine in 2004
- War Plan Orange, a series of US war plans
- Agent Orange, a chemical defoliant

== See also ==
- Agent Orange (disambiguation)
- Orange II (disambiguation)
- L'Orange (disambiguation)
- Oranges and Lemons (disambiguation)
- Orangery, a room or building for fruit trees
- Orangism (disambiguation)
- Oranje (disambiguation)
- Ornge, the air ambulance service for the Canadian province of Ontario
