= Orange man =

Orange man may refer to:

- Orangeman or Orangemen, members of the Orange Order, a Northern Irish Protestant organization
- Orange Man (advertisement), television advertisement of the Tango soft drink in the U.K.
- A man from any place named Orange
- Orangemen, the former nickname for the Syracuse Orange athletic teams
- A slang term for Donald Trump, who served as the 45th and is currently serving as the 47th President of the United States of America
- Orange Guy, long-standing mascot of the New Zealand Electoral Commission
- Orangutan, a great ape species native to Southeast Asia, whose name means "man of the forest"

== See also ==
- Orangemen (disambiguation)
- Orange People (disambiguation)
- Orange (disambiguation)
