= Orangemen =

Orangemen or Orangewomen can refer to:

- Historically, supporters of William of Orange
- Members of the modern Orange Order (also known as Orange Institution), a Protestant fraternal organisation
- Members or supporters of the Armagh GAA Gaelic football team
- The former name of the sports teams of Syracuse University, now called the Syracuse Orange
- The elite cheering group of the Seattle Pacific University men's basketball team

== See also ==
- Orange (disambiguation)
- Orange man (disambiguation)
- Orange People (disambiguation)
