= Alpha-1 Wrestling =

Canadian independent wrestling promotion

Alpha-1
- Acronym: A1
- Founded: 2010
- Style: Professional wrestling
- Headquarters: Hamilton, Ontario
- Founder: Ethan Page
- Website: a1wrestling.com

Alpha-1 Wrestling (A1) is a Canadian independent professional wrestling promotion based out of Hamilton, Ontario. The promotion was founded by Ethan Page in 2010 after he grew tired of inviting his family to see him in bars commenting "I just figured I could do a better show myself". The promotion went on hiatus in 2012 for several months after one of the cameras used to tape a wrestling show was stolen; a longer one started in 2020 as a result of the COVID-19 pandemic. It resumed operations in February 2024; it still continues to operate despite its founder Ethan Page joining WWE in May of the same year.

== Current champions ==
Championship(s)	Current champion(s)	Reign	Date won	Days held	Location	Notes
A1 Alpha Male Championship	Channing Thomas	1	March 1, 2026	259+	Hamilton, Ontario	
A1 Outer Limits Championship	Xavier Walker	1	November 1, 2026	14+	Hamilton, Ontario	
A1 Tag Team Championship	Sam Holloway and TJ Crawford	2	November 1, 2026	14+	Hamilton, Ontario	
A1 Zero Gravity Championship	Jessie V	1	July 26, 2026	112+	Hamilton, Ontario	

== A1 Alpha Male Championship ==
A1 Alpha Male Championship
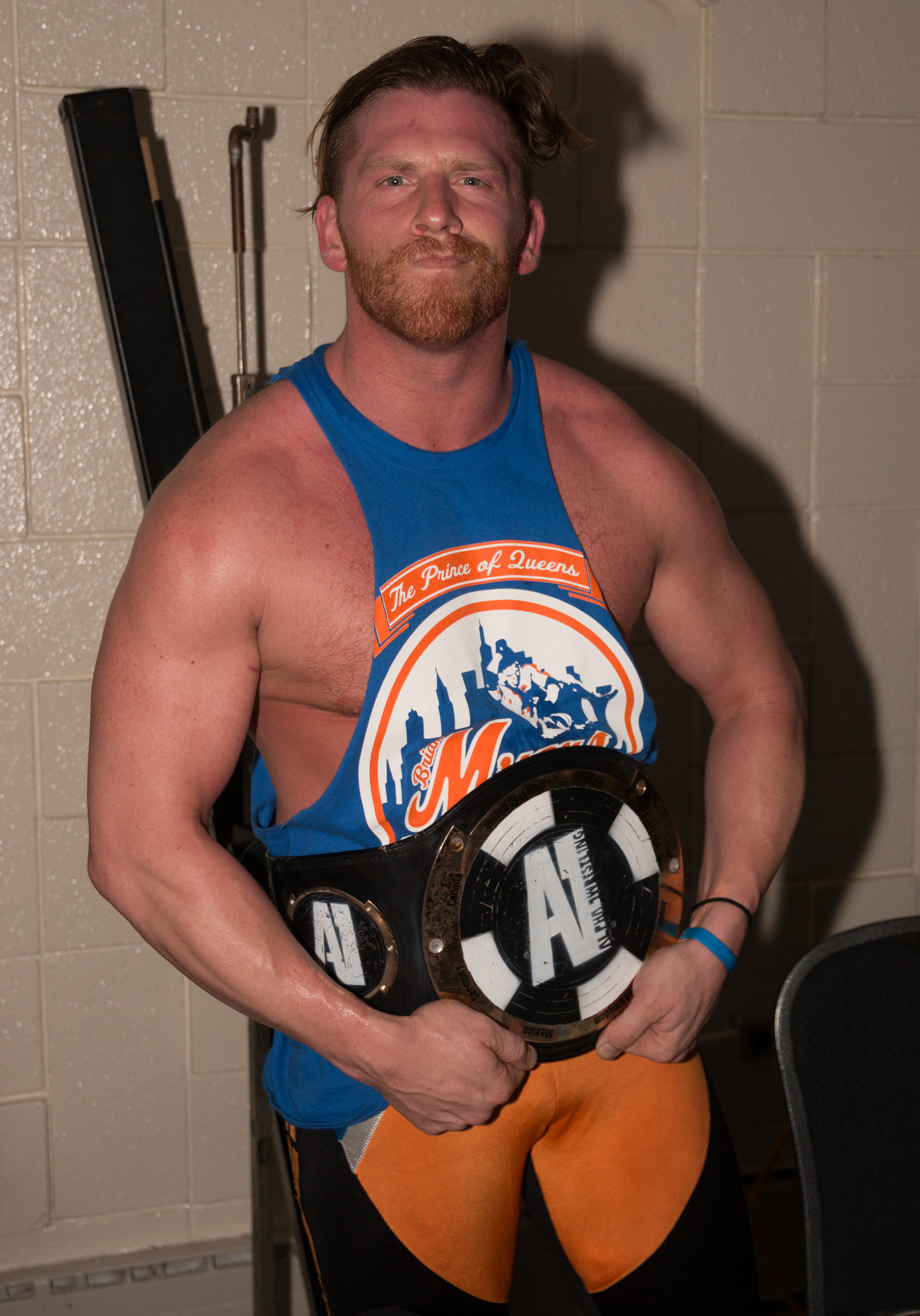
- Brian Myers with the A1 Alpha Male Championship

Details
- Promotion: Alpha-1 Wrestling (A1)
- Date established: October 24, 2010
- Current champion: Channing Thomas
- Date won: March 1, 2026
Statistics
- First champion: Justin Sane
- Most reigns: Josh Alexander (4 reigns)
- Longest reign: Mark Wheeler (1,512 days)
- Shortest reign: Seleziya Sparx and Kobe Durst (<1 day)

=== Reigns ===
Key
No.	Overall reign number
Reign	Reign number for the specific champion
Days	Number of days held
Defenses	Number of successful defenses
+	Current reign is changing daily

No.	Champion	Championship change			Reign statistics			Notes	Ref.
No.	Champion	Date	Event	Location	Reign	Days	Defenses	Notes	Ref.
1	Justin Sane	October 24, 2010	The Final Act	Hamilton, Ontario	1	231	0	Defeated Brodie Lee, Cheech and Michael Elgin in a fatal four-way match in the tournament final to become the Inaugural champion.	
2	Josh Alexander	June 12, 2011	Deadly Encounter	Hamilton, Ontario	1	497	10	This was a four way match which also involves Michael Elgin and Mike Rollins.	
3	Mike Rollins	October 21, 2012	The Final Hurrah	Hamilton, Ontario	1	251	2		
4	Ethan Page	June 29, 2013	Insanity	Hamilton, Ontario	1	316	6	This was a Four Way match which also involved Cheech Hernandez and RJ City.	
5	Alessandro Del Bruno	May 11, 2014	Immortal Kombat II	Hamilton, Ontario	1	498	1		
6	Brent Banks	September 21, 2014	King of Hearts 2014	Hamilton, Ontario	1	203	3		
7	Brian Myers	April 12, 2015	Punished	Hamilton, Ontario	1	63	1	This was a Best of two out of three falls match.	
8	Josh Alexander	June 14, 2015	Assemble	Hamilton, Ontario	2	17 - 47	0		
—	Vacated	July 2015	—	—	—	—	—	Title vacated by Josh Alexander - due to retirement.	
9	Scotty O'Shea	November 15, 2015	Final Act VI	Hamilton, Ontario	1	147	2		
10	Seleziya Sparx	April 10, 2016	Watch The Throne IV	Hamilton, Ontario	1	<1	0	This was a Four Way match which also involved Brent Banks and Cheech.	
11	Josh Alexander	April 10, 2016	Watch The Throne IV	Hamilton, Ontario	3	35	0		
12	Heidi Lovelace	May 15, 2016	Immortal Kombat IV	Hamilton, Ontario	1	126	1	Only Women to win the Alpha Male Championship.	
13	Kobe Durst	September 18, 2016	MatRats II	Hamilton, Ontario	1	434	16	This was a Last Man Standing match	
14	Rickey Shane Page	November 26, 2017	Final Act VIII	Hamilton, Ontario	1	280	11		
15	Kobe Durst	September 2, 2018	King Of Hearts 2018	Hamilton, Ontario	2	<1	0	This was a King Of Hearts tournament semifinal match.	
16	Josh Alexander	September 2, 2018	King Of Hearts 2018	Hamilton, Ontario	4	91	3	This was a King Of Hearts tournament final match.	
17	Kobe Durst	December 2, 2018	Final Act IX	Hamilton, Ontario	3	350	10	This was an Iron man match.	
18	Gregory Iron	November 17, 2019	Final Act X	Hamilton, Ontario	1	28	0		
19	Mark Wheeler	December 15, 2019	Krush The Line	Hamilton, Ontario	1	1,512	1	This was a King of the Mountain Five Way match, also involving Kobe Durst, Rickey Shane Page and Justin Sane.	
20	Shane Sabre	February 4, 2024	Watch The Throne 7 - The Kings Are Back	Hamilton, Ontario	1	105	1	This was a three-way match, also involving Space Monkey	
21	Rickey Shane Page	May 19, 2024	Immortal Kombat 8	Hamilton, Ontario	2	168	2	This was a omega ladder match defeating Shane Sabre, BMD, Mark Wheeler, and Space Monkey	-
22	Brett Michael David	November 3, 2024	Final Act 11	Hamilton, Ontario	1	315	4	Won the title defeating Rickey Shane Page	-
23	Warhorse	September 14, 2025	King of Hearts	Hamilton, Ontario	1	49	0	Won the title by defeating BMD	-
24	Kody Lane	November 2, 2025	Final Act 12	Hamilton, Ontario	1	119	1	Won the title defeating Warhorse in a 30 Minute Iron Man Match	-
25	Channing Thomas	March 1, 2026	Buck Wild	Hamilton, Ontario	1	259+	4	Won the title defeating Kody Lane	-

=== Combined reigns ===
As of 29 June 2026

†	Indicates the current champion

Rank	Wrestler	No. of reigns	Combined defenses	Combined days
1	Mark Wheeler	1	1	1,512
2	Kobe Durst	3	26	784
3	Josh Alexander	4	13	640 - 670
4	Rickey Shane Page	2	13	448
5	Ethan Page	1	6	316
6	Brett Michael David	1	4	315
7	Mike Rollins	1	2	251
8	Justin Sane	1	1	231
9	Channing Thomas †	1	2	259+
10	Brent Banks	1	3	203
11	Scotty O'Shea	1	2	147
12	Alessandro Del Bruno	1	1	133
13	Heidi Lovelace	1	1	126
14	Kody Lane	1	1	119
15	Shane Sabre	1	0	105
16	Brian Myers	1	1	63
17	Warhorse	1	0	49
18	Gregory Iron	1	0	28
19	Seleziya Sparx	1	0	<1

== A1 Outer Limits Championship ==
A1 Outer Limits Championship
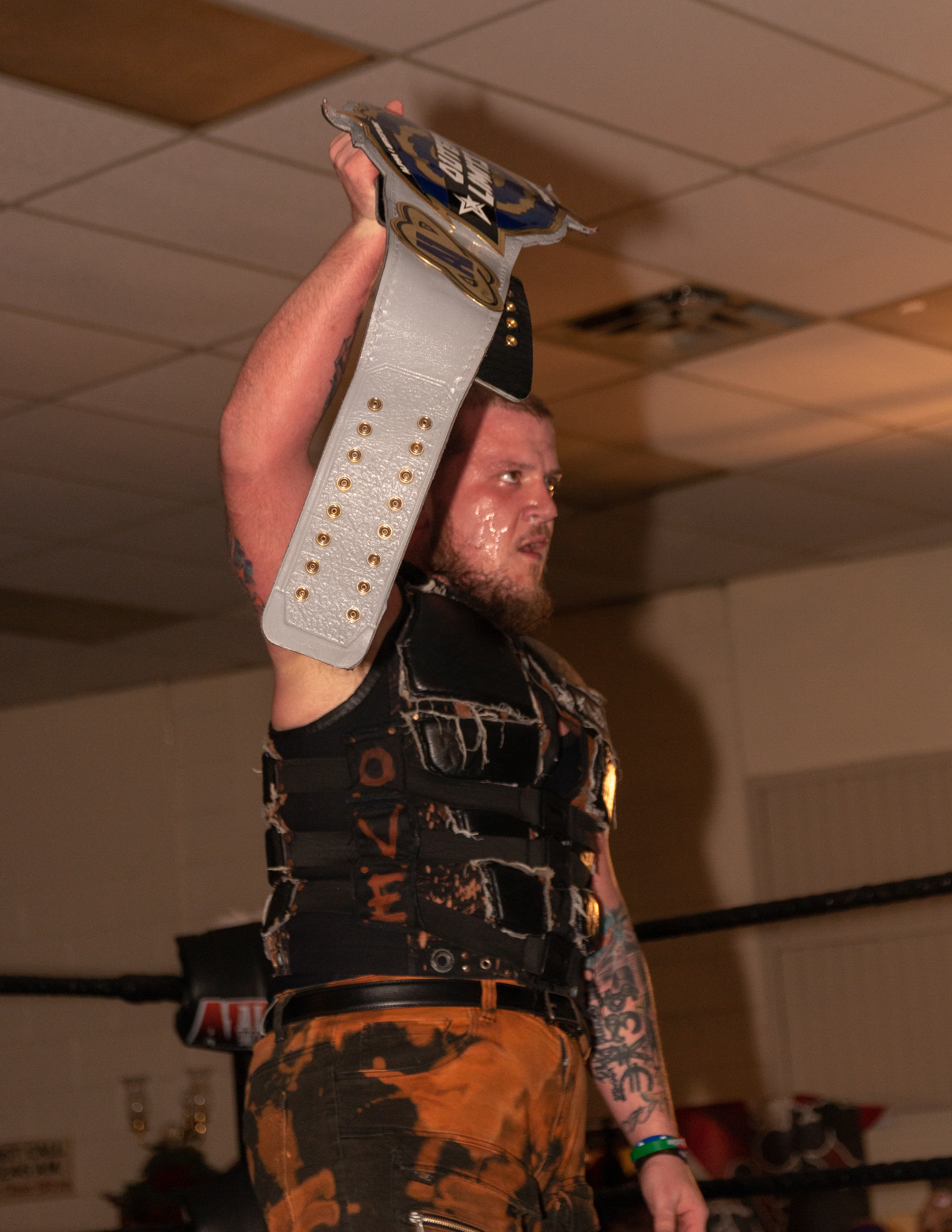
- Sami Callihan as the Alpha-1 Outer Limits Champion

Details
- Promotion: Alpha-1 Wrestling (A1)
- Date established: March 19, 2017
- Current champion: Xavier Walker
- Date won: November, 2026
Statistics
- First champion: Ethan Page
- Most reigns: All title holders (1 reign)
- Longest reign: Steve Brown (1,449 days)
- Shortest reign: Maxwell Jacob Feinstein (<1 day)

=== A1 Outer Limits Title Tournament ===
Semifinals
1	Josh Alexander	Pin
4	Will White
3	Dominic Garrini
2	Ethan Page	Pin

Final
Josh Alexander
Ethan Page	Pin

=== Reigns ===
Key
No.	Overall reign number
Reign	Reign number for the specific champion
Days	Number of days held
Defenses	Number of successful defenses
+	Current reign is changing daily

No.	Champion	Championship change			Reign statistics			Notes	Ref.
No.	Champion	Date	Event	Location	Reign	Days	Defenses	Notes	Ref.
1	Ethan Page	March 19, 2017	No Laughing Matter	Hamilton, Ontario	1	56	1	Defeated Josh Alexander in the tournament final to become Inaugural champion.	
2	Maxwell Jacob Feinstein	May 14, 2017	Immortal Kombat V	Hamilton, Ontario	1	<1	0		
3	Joey Janela	May 14, 2017	Immortal Kombat V	Hamilton, Ontario	1	91	0		
4	Stokely Hathaway	August 13, 2017	King of Hearts 2017	Hamilton, Ontario	1	210	1	This was a Four Way match which also involved Dominic Garrini and Maxwell Jacob Friedman.	
—	Vacated	March 11, 2018	—	—	—	—	—		
5	Brett Michael David	April 15, 2018	Show Me What You Got	Hamilton, Ontario	1	189	3	Defeated Mark Wheeler, Myron Reed, Shane Sabre and Space Monkey in a Five Way Elimination match to win the vacant title.	
6	Eric Cairnie	October 21, 2018	Another Long Halloween	Hamilton, Ontario	1	42	0	This was a Six Way Sudden Death Elimination match which also involved Mark Wheeler, Matt Knicks, Pat Monix and Justin Sane.	
7	Sami Callihan	December 2, 2018	Final Act IX	Hamilton, Ontario	1	63	0	This was a Battle Royal match.	
8	Justin Sane	February 3, 2019	Super Slam Sunday	Hamilton, Ontario	1	287	3	This was a Four Way match which also involved Josh Alexander and Kobe Durst.	
9	Holden Albright	November 17, 2019	Final Act X	Hamilton, Ontario	1	91	1	This was a Seven Way Elimination Ultimate Scramble match which involved Dan The Dad, Eddie Osbourne, Rohit Raju, Steve Brown and Steve Manders.	
10	Steve Brown	February 16, 2020	Deadly Encounter	Hamilton, Ontario	1	1,449	2	This was a Four Way Elimination match, which involved Matthew Justice and Eric Ryan.	
11	Josh Bishop	February 2, 2024	Watch The Throne 7 - The Kings Are Back	Hamilton, Ontario	1	105	0	This was a Six Way Elimination No Disqualification match, which involved Derek Dillinger, Ethan Price, Juntai Miller and Kubes.	
12	Derek Dillinger	May 19, 2024	Immortal Kombat 8	Hamilton, Ontario	1	56	0	Won the title defeating Josh Bishop, Lance Archer, Bulk Bronson, Jessie V & Puf	
13	Jose the Assassin	July 14, 2024	Another Day In Paradise	Hamilton, Ontario	1	112	0	Won the title defeating Josh Bishop, Derek Dillinger, Sam Holloway, Chambers, Bryce Hansen & Vinnie Pacifico	
14	Channing Thomas	November 3, 2024	Final Act 11	Hamilton, Ontario	1	259	3	Won the title defeating Jose The Assassin, Derek Dillinger, London Lightning, Bryce Hansen & Mike Forte	
15	Zeeko	July 20, 2025	The Purge	Hamilton, Ontario	1	105	1	Captured the championship at The Purge in a multi-man match.	
16	Sam Holloway	November 2, 2025	Final Act 12	Hamilton, Ontario	1	119	1	ZEEKO vacated the championship. Sam won the title after defeating Jimmy Townsend, Cheech, Abu, Jonny Deluca, Jon Jon Tavious, Flyin Ryan O’Neill, and Juni Underwood.	
17	Bryce Hansen	March 1, 2026	Buck Wild	Hamilton, Ontario	1	98	1	-	
18	Anthony Greene	June 7, 2026	Watch the Throne	Hamilton, Ontario	1	98	1	-	
19	Jay Blast	September 13, 2026	King of Hearts	Hamilton, Ontario	1	63+	0	-	
20	Xavier Walker	November 1, 2026	Final Act	Hamilton, Ontario	1	14+	0		

=== Combined reigns ===
As of November 15, 2026.

†	Indicates the current champion

Rank	Wrestler	No. of reigns	Combined defenses	Combined days
1	Steve Brown	1	2	1,449
2	Justin Sane	1	3	287
3	Channing Thomas	1	3	259
4	Stokely Hathaway	1	3	210
5	Brett Michael David	1	3	189
6	Sam Holloway	1	1	119
7	Jose The Assassin	1	0	112
8	Josh Bishop	1	0	105
8	Zeeko	1	1	105
9	Bryce Hansen	1	1	98
9	Anthony Greene	1	0	98
10	Holden Albright	1	1	91
10	Joey Janela	1	0	91
11	Sami Callihan	1	0	73
12	Ethan Page	1	2	56
12	Derek Dillinger	1	0	56
13	Eric Cairnie	1	0	42
14	Jay Blast †	1	0	63+
15	Xavier Walker	1	0	14+
16	Maxwell Jacob Feinstein	1	0	<1

== A1 Zero Gravity Championship ==
A1 Zero Gravity Championship
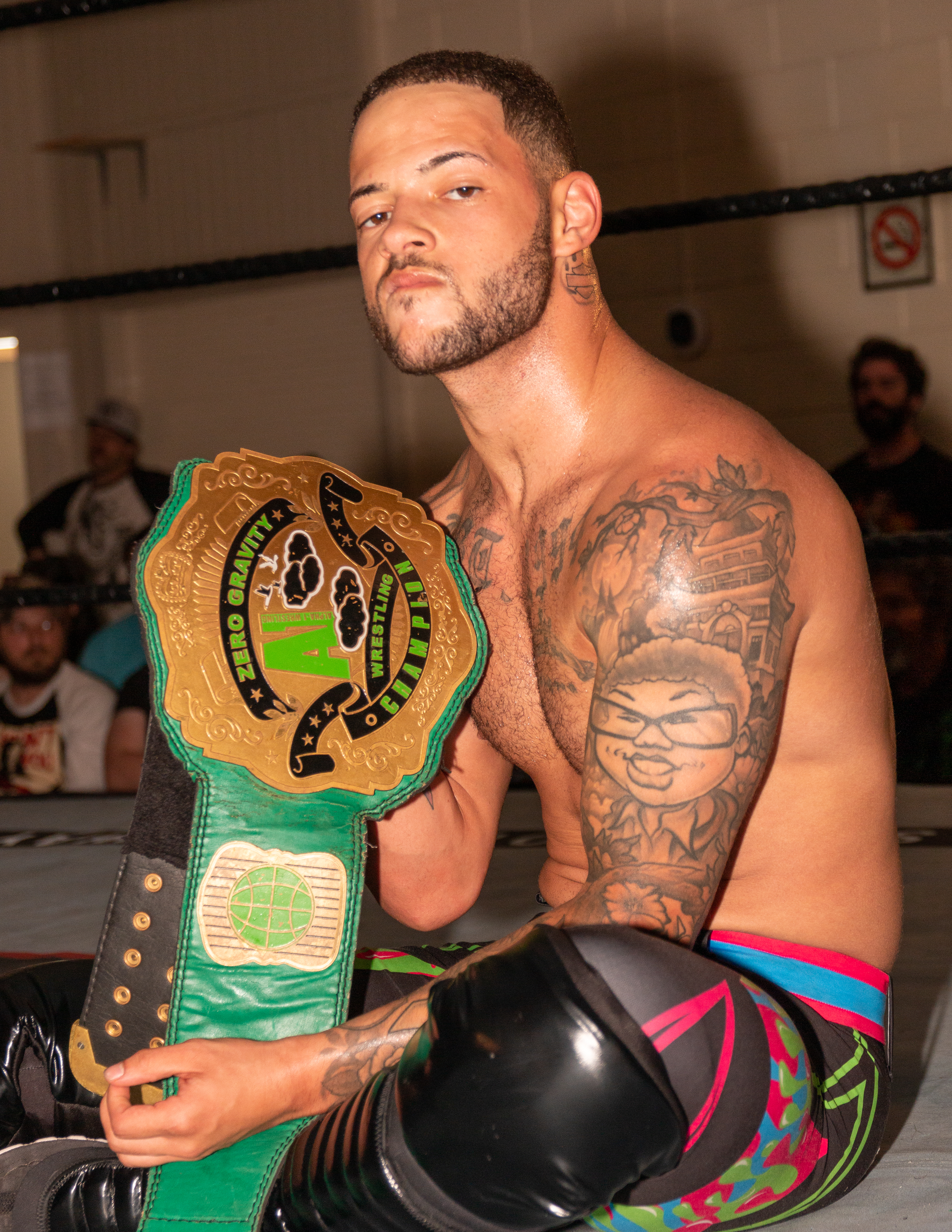
- Trey Miguel posing with the A1 Zero Gravity Championship belt

Details
- Promotion: Alpha-1 Wrestling (A1)
- Date established: February 20, 2011
- Current champion: Jessie V
- Date won: July 26, 2026
Statistics
- First champion: Timothy Krane
- Most reigns: Alessandro Del Bruno (2 reigns)
- Longest reign: Dan The Dad (1,512 days)
- Shortest reign: Brodie Lee, Justin Sane and Michael Elgin (<1 day)

=== Reigns ===
Key
No.	Overall reign number
Reign	Reign number for the specific champion
Days	Number of days held
Defenses	Number of successful defenses
+	Current reign is changing daily

No.	Champion	Championship change			Reign statistics			Notes	Ref.
No.	Champion	Date	Event	Location	Reign	Days	Defenses	Notes	Ref.
1	Timothy Krane	February 20, 2011	Stage II	Hamilton, Ontario	1	182	2	Defeated Alessandro Del Bruno, Andrew Davis and Anthony Fiasco in a Four Way match to become Inaugural champion.	
2	Alessandro Del Bruno	August 21, 2011	One More Day In Paradise	Hamilton, Ontario	1	63	1		
3	Brodie Lee	October 23, 2011	The Final Act II	Hamilton, Ontario	1	<1	0		
4	Michael Elgin	October 23, 2011	The Final Act II	Hamilton, Ontario	1	<1	0		
5	Josh Alexander	October 23, 2011	The Final Act II	Hamilton, Ontario	1	615	7	This was a Winner Takes All match in which Alexander defended the A1 Alpha Male Championship.	
6	Brent B	June 29, 2013	Insanity	Hamilton, Ontario	1	155	2		
7	Alex Vega	December 1, 2013	Watch The Throne II	Hamilton, Ontario	1	42	0		
8	Eric Cairnie	January 12, 2014	Chaos Cup	Hamilton, Ontario	1	175	2	This was a Three Way match which also involved Josh Rogen.	
9	Lionel Knight	July 6, 2014	Mighty Morphin Power Wrestling	Hamilton, Ontario	1	77	0	This was a Gauntlet match which also involved Josh Rogen, Marc Hauss, Ryan Smith, Tyler Loveman and Will White.	
10	Josh Rogen	September 21, 2014	King of Hearts 2014	Hamilton, Ontario	1	42	0	This was a Three Way match which also involved Shane Sabre and Eric Cairnie.	
11	Rickey Shane Page	November 2, 2014	Final Act Five	Hamilton, Ontario	1	378	9		
12	Kobe Durst	November 15, 2015	Final Act VI	Hamilton, Ontario	1	182	6	This was a Three Way match which also involved Tyler Thomas.	
13	Alessandro Del Bruno	May 15, 2016	Immortal Kombat IV	Hamilton, Ontario	2	399	12	This was a Three Way match which also involved Alex Daniels.	
14	Space Monkey	June 18, 2017	Do Or Do Not There Is No Try	Hamilton, Ontario	1	84	3		
15	Gregory Iron	September 10, 2017	Beyond Compare	Hamilton, Ontario	1	77	1		
16	Shane Sabre	November 26, 2017	Final Act VIII	Hamilton, Ontario	1	84	3		
17	Alex Daniels	February 18, 2018	Keep The Dream Alive	Hamilton, Ontario	1	196	5		
18	Josh Briggs	September 2, 2018	King Of Hearts 2018	Hamilton, Ontario	1	91	2		
19	Cheech	December 2, 2018	Final Act IX	Hamilton, Ontario	1	98	1	This was a four way elimination match which also involved Anthony Greene and Paul London.	
20	Brett Michael David	March 10, 2019	Watch The Throne VI	Hamilton, Ontario	1	112	3		
21	Justin Sane	June 30, 2019	The Otherside	Hamilton, Ontario	1	<1	0	This was a Lumberjack match	
22	Trey Miguel	June 30, 2019	The Otherside	Hamilton, Ontario	1	140	2		
23	Orange Cassidy	November 17, 2019	Final Act X	Hamilton, Ontario	1	28	0	This was a four way elimination match which also involved Kody Lane and Brett Michael David.	
24	Dan The Dad	December 15, 2019	Krush The Line	Hamilton, Ontario	1	1,512	1	This was a four way elimination match which also involved Danhausen and Effy.	
25	Rohit Raju	February 2, 2024	Watch The Throne 7 - The Kings Are Back	Hamilton, Ontario	1	1,015	0	This was a three-way match, which also involved Max Caster.	
26	Evil Uno	March 24, 2024	Deadly Encounter	Hamilton, Ontario	1	56	0		
27	Kody Lane	May 19, 2024	Immortal Kombat 8	Hamilton, Ontario	1	308	8	Won the title defeating Rohit Raju & Evil Uno.	-
28	TJ Crawford	March 23, 2025	Beyond Compare	Hamilton, Ontario	1	42	0	Won the title defeating Kody Lane.	-
29	Alec Price	May 4, 2025	Immortal Kombat 9	Hamilton, Ontario	1	296	4	Won the title defeating TJ Crawford	-
30	Mark Wheeler	March 1, 2026	Buck Wild	Hamilton, Ontario	1	147	1	-	-
31	Jessie V	July 26, 2026	The Purge	Hamilton, Ontario	1	112+	3	-	-

=== Combined reigns ===
As of 29 June 2026

†	Indicates the current champion

Rank	Wrestler	No. of reigns	Combined defenses	Combined days
1	Dan The Dad	1	1	1,512
2	Rohit Raju	1	1	953
3	Josh Alexander	1	7	615
4	Alessandro Del Bruno	2	13	462
5	Rickey Shane Page	1	9	378
6	Kody Lane	1	8	308
7	Alec Price	1	4	296
8	Alex Daniels	1	5	196
9	Kobe Durst	1	6	182
9	Timothy Krane	1	2	182
10	Eric Cairnie	1	2	175
11	Brent Banks	1	2	155
12	Mark Wheeler	1	1	147
13	Trey Miguel	1	2	140
14	Brett Michael David	1	3	112
15	Jessie V †	1	3	112+
16	Cheech	1	1	98
17	Josh Briggs	1	2	91
18	Space Monkey	1	3	84
18	Shane Sabre	1	3	84
19	Gregory Iron	1	1	77
19	Lionel Knight	1	0	77
20	Evil Uno	1	0	56
21	Alex Vega	1	0	42
21	Josh Rogen	1	0	42
21	TJ Crawford	1	0	42
22	Orange Cassidy	1	0	28
23	Brodie Lee	1	0	<1
23	Justin Sane	1	0	<1
23	Michael Elgin	1	0	<1

== A1 Tag Team Championship ==
A1 Tag Team Championship
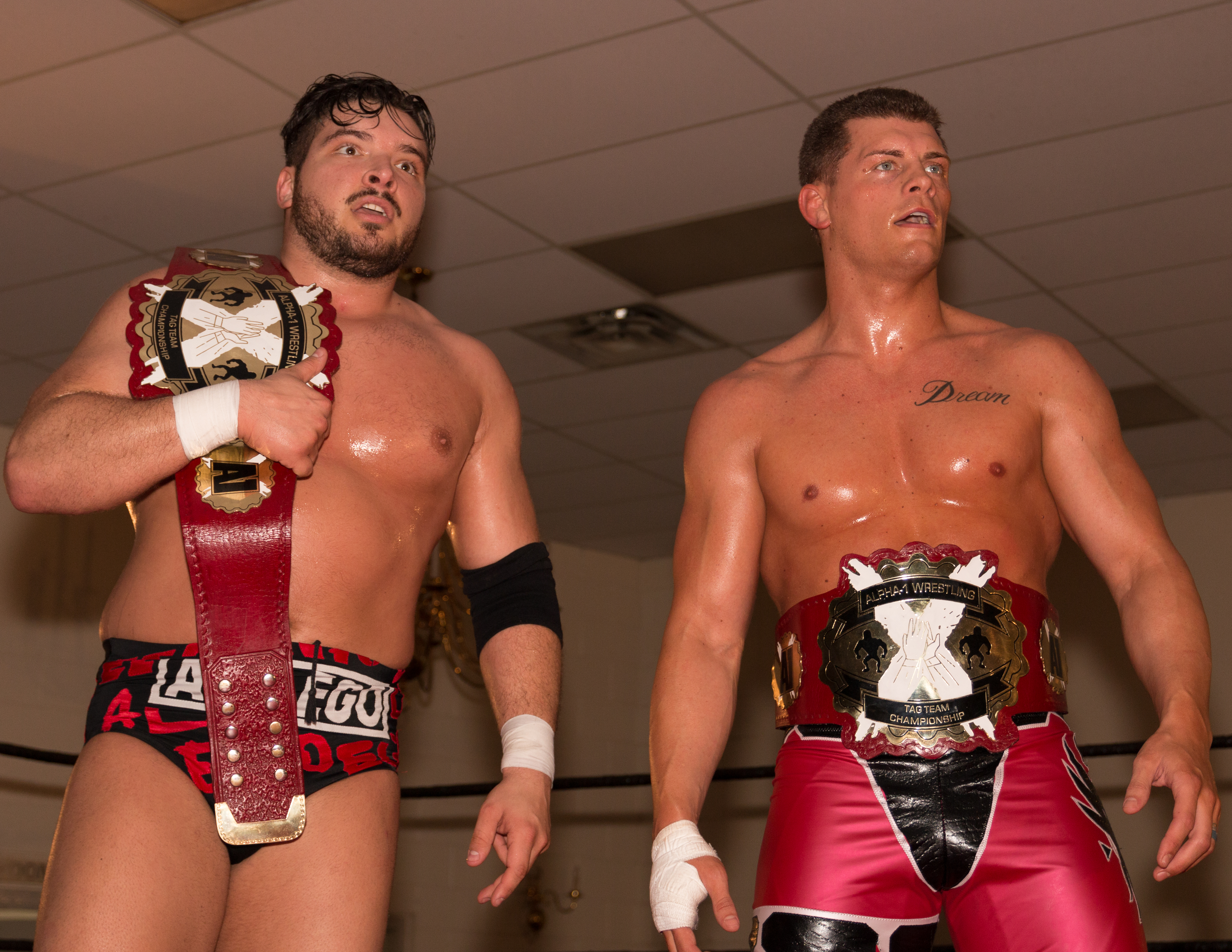
- Ethan Page (left) and Cody Rhodes (right) as Alpha-1 Tag Team Champions in June 2017

Details
- Promotion: Alpha-1 Wrestling (A1)
- Date established: August 21, 2011
- Current champions: Sam Holloway and TJ Crawford
- Date won: November 1, 2026
Statistics
- First champions: The Super Smash Brothers (Player Dos and Player Uno)
- Most reigns: As Tag Team (2 reigns): The Super Smash Brothers (Player Dos and Player Uno); Western Med Connection (Dr. Daniel C. Rockingham and Jim Nye); As Individual (3 reigns): Jim Nye; Shane Sabre
- Longest reign: A1 Originalz; Cheech and Justin Sane) (1,084 days)
- Shortest reign: Western Med Connection (Dr. Daniel C. Rockingham and Jim Nye) (28 days)

=== Reigns ===
Key
No.	Overall reign number
Reign	Reign number for the specific champion
Days	Number of days held
Defenses	Number of successful defenses
+	Current reign is changing daily

No.	Champion	Championship change			Reign statistics			Notes	Ref.
No.	Champion	Date	Event	Location	Reign	Days	Defenses	Notes	Ref.
1	The Super Smash Brothers (Player Dos and Player Uno)	August 21, 2011	One More Day In Paradise	Hamilton, Ontario	1	63	0	Defeated Checkmate (Christopher Bishop and Lionel Knight) and The Convoy (Dan Magnum and Steve Brown) in a Three Way Elimination match to become Inaugural champions.	
2	Checkmate (Christopher Bishop and Lionel Knight)	October 23, 2011	The Final Act 2	Hamilton, Ontario	1	279	5		
3	Irish Airborne (Dave Crist and Jake Crist)	July 28, 2012	The 2012 King Of Hearts Invitational - Night One	Hamilton, Ontario	1	904	1		
—	Vacated	January 18, 2015	—	—	—	—	—	Title vacated & division closed.	
4	Gym Rats (Alessandro Del Bruno and Scotty O'Shea)	January 18, 2015	Matrats	Hamilton, Ontario	1	112	1	Defeated 3.0, GOAT Brigade (Kirk Warmack and Shane Sabre) and Oppression (Justin Sane and Lionel Knight) in a Four Way match to win the vacant title.	
5	The Super Smash Brothers (Player Dos and Player Uno)	May 10, 2015	Immortal Kombat III	Hamilton, Ontario	2	35	0		
6	The Oppression (Justin Sane and Lionel Knight)	June 14, 2015	Assemble	Hamilton, Ontario	1 (1, 2)	301	4	This was a Six Way Scramble match.	
7	Theory Of Evolution (Jim Nye and The Space Monkey)	April 10, 2016	Watch The Throne IV	Hamilton, Ontario	1	203	4	This was a Three Way match which also involved EZE and Gregory Iron.	
8	Gregory Iron and Rickey Shane Page	October 30, 2016	A Long Halloween	Hamilton, Ontario	1	126	2		
9	Virus (Josh Alexander and Tyson Dux)	March 5, 2017	Get Rich Or Die Tryin	Hamilton, Ontario	1	70	0	This was a Three Way match which also involved Young Money (Brent Banks and Young Myles)	
10	Gavin Quinn and Josh Alexander	May 14, 2017	Immortal Kombat V	Hamilton, Ontario	1	35	1	Gavin Quinn was awarded the one-half of the Title, after Tyson Dux refused to honor his commitments as champion.	
11	2-Stars (Cody Rhodes and Ethan Page)	June 18, 2017	Do Or Do Not There Is No Try	Hamilton, Ontario	1	217	2		
12	Western Med Connection (Dr. Daniel C. Rockingham and Jim Nye)	January 21, 2018	Wrestlers Gone Wild	Hamilton, Ontario	1 (1, 2)	28	1	This was a Gauntlet match.	
13	Anthony Greene and Gregory Iron	February 18, 2018	Keep The Dream Alive	Hamilton, Ontario	1 (1, 2)	56	1	This was a Three Way match which also involved The Meme Team (Eric Cairnie and Jesse Bieber).	
14	Western Med Connection (Dr. Daniel C. Rockingham and Jim Nye)	April 15, 2018	Show Me What You Got	Hamilton, Ontario	2 (2, 3)	105	2		
15	Space Pirates (Shane Sabre and Space Monkey)	July 29, 2018	The Purge III	Hamilton, Ontario	1 (1, 2)	308	13		
16	Besties In The World (Davey Vega and Mat Fitchett)	June 2, 2019	Glory Pro Special Champions Edition	Hamilton, Ontario	1	77	1		
17	The North (Ethan Page and Josh Alexander)	August 18, 2019	The Purge IV	Hamilton, Ontario	1 (2, 2)	91	1	This was a Gauntlet match.	
18	Fight Or Flight (Gabriel Fuerza and Vaughn Vertigo)	November 17, 2019	Final Act X	Hamilton, Ontario	1	91	1	This was a Three Way match which also involved The Rascalz (Dezmond Xavier and Zachary Wentz); Jade Chung replaced Josh Alexander	
19	A1 Originalz (Cheech and Justin Sane)	February 16, 2020	Deadly Encounter	Hamilton, Ontario	1 (1, 2)	1,084	0	This was a Four Way match which also involved The Space Pirates (Shane Sabre and Space Monkey) and Sad Buds (Brett Michael David and Rickey Shane Page).	
20	Sad Buds (Brett Michael David and Rickey Shane Page)	February 2, 2024	Watch The Throne 7 - The Kings Are Back	Hamilton, Ontario	1 (1, 2)	57	0	This was a three-way match, which also involved Max Caster. Eric Cairnie replaced Justin Sane; Sane acted as special guest referee	
21	Fight Or Flight (Gabriel Fuerza and Vaughn Vertigo)	April 2, 2024	Watch The Throne 7 - The Kings Are Back	Hamilton, Ontario	2	228	2		
22	Locked & Loaded	November 15, 2024	Watch The Throne 7 - The Kings Are Back	Hamilton, Ontario	1	128	1		
23	Dan the Dad & Ethan Price	March 23, 2025	Beyond Compare	Hamilton, Ontario	1	42	1		
24	PME	May 4, 2025	Immortal Kombat 9	Hamilton, Ontario	1	133	1		
25	Swipe Right (Brad Baylor and Ricky Smokes)	September 14, 2025	King of Hearts	Hamilton, Ontario	1	126	1		
26	Shane Sabre and Mike Forte	January 18, 2026	Laws of the Jungle	Hamilton, Ontario	1 (2, 1)	84	1		
27	The Verdict (VSK & Bryce Donovan)	April 12, 2026	Immortal Kombat 10	Hamilton, Ontario	1	154	1		
28	Shane Sabre and Mike Forte	September 13, 2026	King Of Hearts 2026	Hamilton, Ontario	2 (3, 2)	49	0		
29	A Touch of Class; Sam Holloway and TJ Crawford	November 1, 2026	Final Act	Hamilton, Ontario	1	14+	0		

=== Combined reigns ===
†	Indicates the current champions

=== By team ===
Rank	Team	No. of reigns	Successful defenses	Combined days
1	A1 Originalz (Cheech and Justin Sane)	1	0	1,084
2	Sad Buds (Brett Michael David and Rickey Shane Page)	1	0	964
3	Irish Airborne (Dave Crist and Jake Crist)	1	0	904
4	Fight Or Flight (Gabriel Fuerza and Vaughn Vertigo)	2	3	319
5	Space Pirates (Shane Sabre and Space Monkey)	1	13	308
6	The Oppression (Justin Sane and Lionel Knight)	1	4	301
7	Checkmate (Christopher Bishop and Lionel Knight)	1	5	279
8	2-Stars (Cody Rhodes and Ethan Page)	1	2	217
9	Theory Of Evolution (Jim Nye and The Space Monkey)	1	4	203
10	The Verdict (VSK and Bryce Donovan)	1	1	154
11	Western Med Connection (Dr. Daniel C. Rockingham and Jim Nye)	2	3	133
11	PME	1	1	133
12	Locked and Loaded	1	1	128
13	Swipe Right (Brad Baylor and Ricky Smokes)	1	1	126
13	Gregory Iron and Rickey Shane Page	1	2	126
14	Gym Rats (Alessandro Del Bruno and Scotty O'Shea)	1	1	112
15	The Super Smash Brothers (Player Dos and Player Uno)	2	0	98
16	The North (Ethan Page and Josh Alexander)	1	1	91
17	Besties In The World (Davey Vega and Mat Fitchett)	1	1	77
18	Virus (Josh Alexander and Tyson Dux)	1	0	70
19	Anthony Greene and Gregory Iron	1	1	56
20	Shane Sabre and Mike Forte	2	1	49
21	Dan the Dad and Ethan Price	1	1	42
22	Gavin Quinn and Josh Alexander	1	1	35
23	A Touch of Class (Sam Holloway and TJ Crawford) †	1	0	14+

=== By wrestler ===
Rank	Wrestler	No. of reigns	Successful defenses	Combined days
1	Justin Sane	2	4	1,385
2	Cheech	1	0	1,084
3	Dave Crist	1	1	904
3	Jake Crist	1	1	904
5	Lionel Knight	2	9	580
6	Space Monkey	2	16	511
7	Jim Nye	3	7	336
8	Ethan Page	2	3	308
8	Shane Sabre	1	12	308
9	Sam Holloway †	1	0	14+
9	TJ Crawford †	1	0	14+
	Shane Sabre	3	14	441
10	Christopher Bishop	1	5	279
11	Cody Rhodes	1	2	217
12	Josh Alexander	2	2	196
13	Gregory Iron	2	3	182
14	Bryce Donovan	1	3	154
14	VSK	1	3	154
15	Mike Forte	2	1	133
15	Dr. Daniel C. Rockingham	2	3	133
16	Rickey Shane Page	1	2	126
16	Brad Baylor	1	1	126
16	Ricky Smokes	1	1	126
17	Alessandro Del Bruno	1	1	112
17	Scotty O'Shea	1	1	112
18	Gavin Quinn	1	1	105
18	Tyson Dux	1	1	105
19	Player Dos	2	0	98
19	Player Uno	2	0	98
20	Gabriel Fuerza	1	1	91
20	Vaughn Vertigo	1	1	91
21	Davey Vega	1	1	77
21	Mat Fitchett	1	1	77
22	Anthony Greene	1	1	56
23	Ethan Price	1	1	42
23	Dan the Dad	1	1	42
24	Brett Michael David	1	0	964

== Tournaments ==
=== King Of Hearts 2018 ===
First Round
Josh Alexander	Pin
Gregory Iron
Ethan Page
J. T. Dunn	Pin
Rickey Shane Page	Pin
Mark Wheeler
Justin Sane
Kobe Durst	Pin

Semifinals
Josh Alexander	Pin
J. T. Dunn
Rickey Shane Page
Kobe Durst	Pin

Finals
Josh Alexander	Pin
Kobe Durst

=== King Of Hearts 2021 ===
Quarter Final
Kobe Durst
Steve Brown	Pin
Brett Michael David	Pin
Eric Cairnie
Jody Threat
Mark Wheeler	Pin
Jessie V	Pin
Kirk Warmack

Semi Final
Steve Brown
Brett Michael David	Pin
Mark Wheeler	Pin
Jessie V

Final
Brett Michael David
Mark Wheeler	Pin
