= List of AEW International Champions =

Professional wrestling champions

The AEW International Championship is a professional wrestling championship created and promoted by the American promotion All Elite Wrestling (AEW). It is a secondary championship for male wrestlers, and unlike AEW's other titles, which are almost exclusively defended on AEW programming, the International Championship can also be defended in other promotions globally.

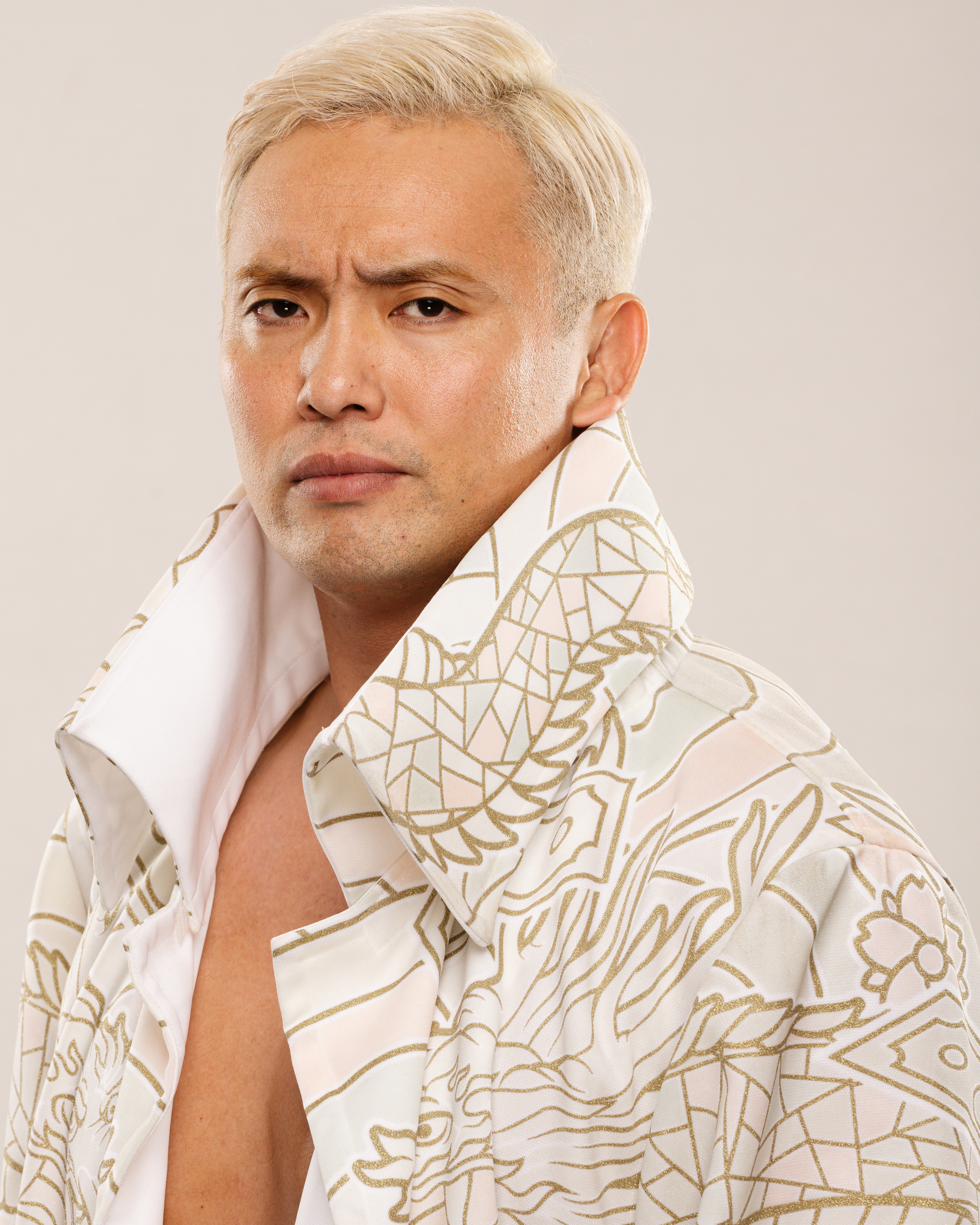
Current and record-tying two-champion Kazuchika Okada

As of November 7, 2026, there have been 15 reigns between 11 champions. Pac was the inaugural champion. Orange Cassidy, Will Ospreay, Konosuke Takeshita and Kazuchika Okada are tied for the most reigns at two, with Cassidy's first reign being the longest reign at 326 days, and he has the longest combined reign at 471 days. Jon Moxley has the shortest reign at 17 days. Kyle Fletcher is the youngest champion, winning the title at 27, while Kenny Omega is the oldest, winning the title at 41.

The reigning champion is Kazuchika Okada, who is in his first record-tying second reign. He won the title by defeating previous champion Kyle Fletcher and Konosuke Takeshita in a three-way match at All In on August 30, 2026, in London, England.

== Title history ==
Name	Years
AEW All-Atlantic Championship	June 8, 2022 – March 15, 2023
AEW International Championship	March 15, 2023 – present
AEW American Championship	July 24, 2024 – August 25, 2024 (unofficial name used by MJF during his reign)

Key
No.	Overall reign number
Reign	Reign number for the specific champion
Days	Number of days held
+	Current reign is changing daily

No.	Champion	Championship change			Reign statistics		Notes	Ref.
No.	Champion	Date	Event	Location	Reign	Days	Notes	Ref.
1	Pac	June 26, 2022	Forbidden Door	Chicago, IL	1	108	Defeated Clark Connors, Malakai Black, and Miro in a four-way tournament final to become the inaugural AEW All-Atlantic Champion.	
2	Orange Cassidy	October 12, 2022	Dynamite	Toronto, ON, Canada	1	326	The title was rebranded as the AEW International Championship on March 15, 2023.	
3	Jon Moxley	September 3, 2023	All Out	Chicago, IL	1	17		
4	Rey Fénix	September 20, 2023	Dynamite: Grand Slam	Queens, NY	1	20	This was a legitimate unplanned finish. During the match, Moxley suffered an injury and called an audible for Fénix to pin him.	
5	Orange Cassidy	October 10, 2023	Dynamite: Title Tuesday	Independence, MO	2	145		
6	Roderick Strong	March 3, 2024	Revolution	Greensboro, NC	1	84		
7	Will Ospreay	May 26, 2024	Double or Nothing	Paradise, NV	1	52		
8	MJF	July 17, 2024	Dynamite 250	North Little Rock, AR	1	39	During this reign, MJF unofficially rebranded the title as the AEW American Championship.	
9	Will Ospreay	August 25, 2024	All In: London	London, England	2	48		
10	Konosuke Takeshita	October 12, 2024	WrestleDream	Tacoma, WA	1	148	This was a three-way match, also involving Ricochet.	
11	Kenny Omega	March 9, 2025	Revolution	Los Angeles, CA	1	125		
12	Kazuchika Okada	July 12, 2025	All In: Texas	Arlington, TX	1	316	This was a Winner Takes All match in which Okada defended the AEW Continental Championship, also becoming the inaugural AEW Unified Champion. After Okada lost the Continental Championship at Worlds End on December 27, 2025, it ended the unification, rendering the Unified title inactive.	
13	Konosuke Takeshita	May 24, 2026	Double or Nothing	Queens, NY	2	45		
14	Kyle Fletcher	July 8, 2026	Dynamite: Beach Break	Clearwater, FL	1	53		
15	Kazuchika Okada	August 30, 2026	All In	London, England	2	69+	This was a three-way match, also involving Konosuke Takeshita.	

== Combined reigns ==
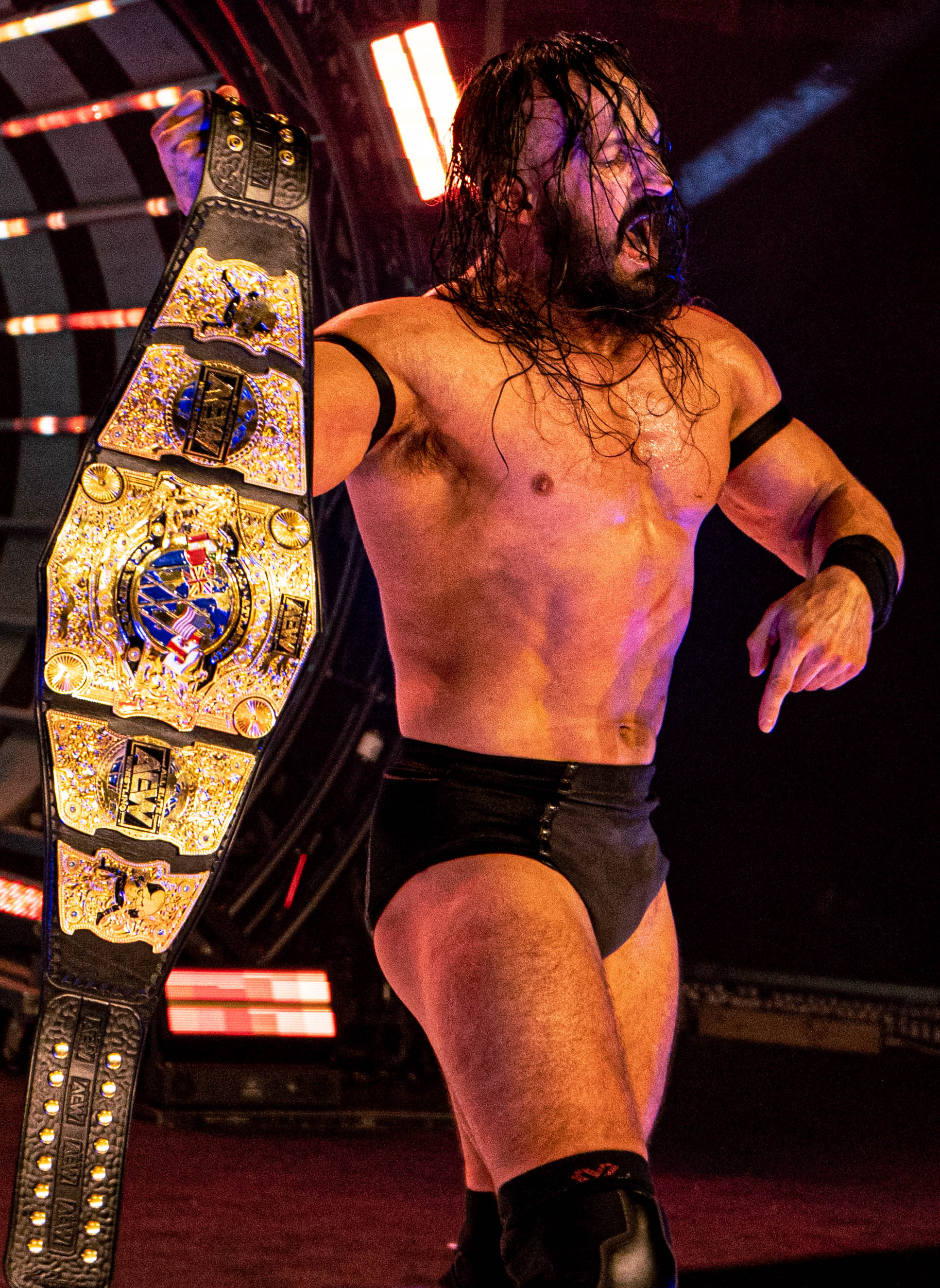
Inaugural champion Pac, who won the title as the AEW All-Atlantic Championship

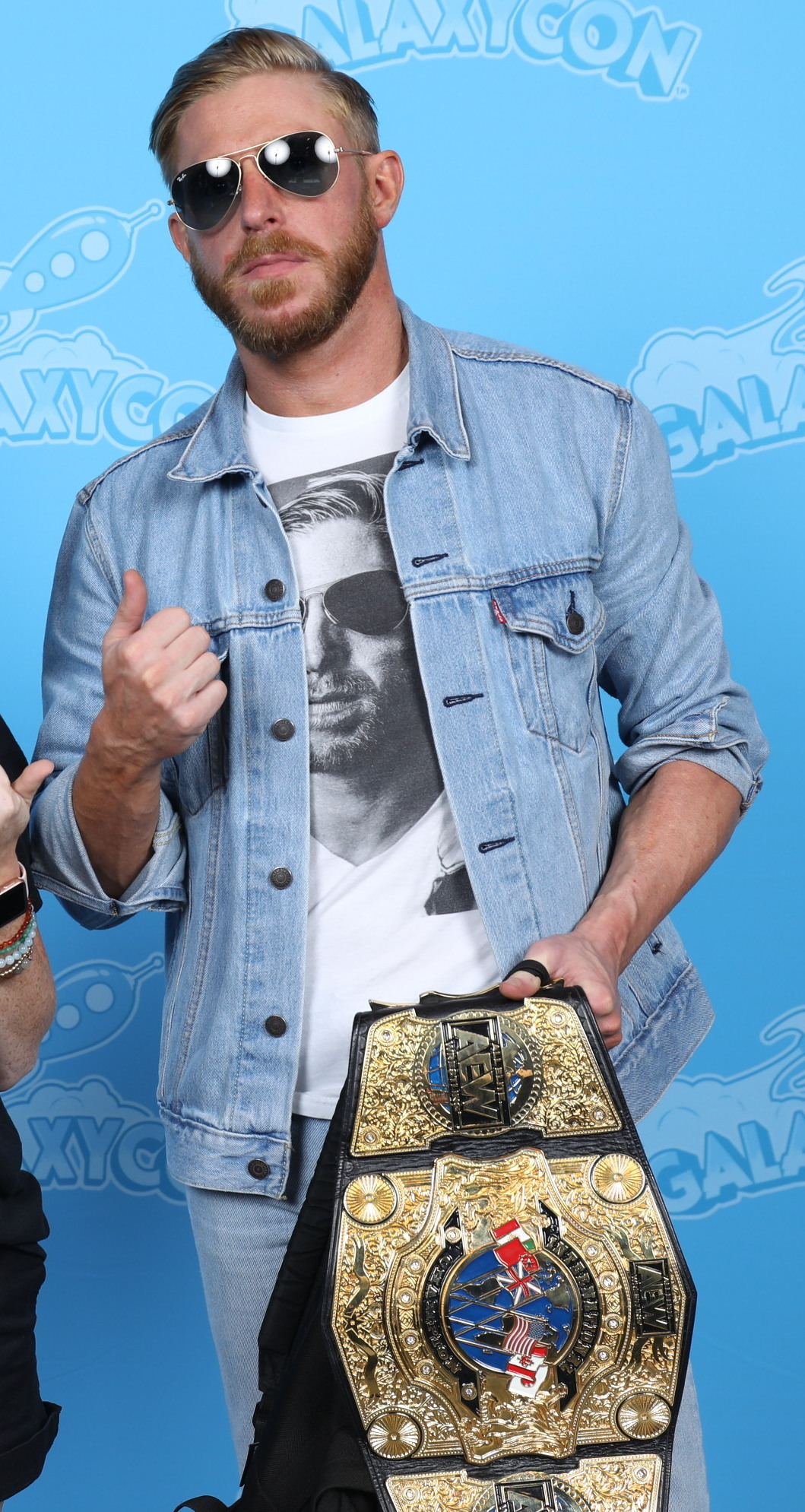
Record-tying two-time and longest reigning champion Orange Cassidy, who has held the title for a record 471 days combined over his two title reigns.

As of November 7, 2026.

†	Indicates the current champion

Rank	Wrestler	No. of reigns	Combined days
1	Orange Cassidy	2	471
2	Kazuchika Okada †	2	384+
3	Konosuke Takeshita	2	193
4	Kenny Omega	1	125
5	Pac	1	108
6	Will Ospreay	2	100
7	Roderick Strong	1	84
8	Kyle Fletcher	1	53
9	MJF	1	39
10	Rey Fenix	1	20
11	Jon Moxley	1	17
