= Lorange =

Lorange is a surname. Notable people with the surname include:

- David M. Lorange (born 1979), American coastal guard
- Peter Lorange (born 1943), Norwegian economist
- Pierre Lorange, Canadian politician

== See also ==
- L'Orange (disambiguation)
