= Oranje =

Oranje may refer to:

- A national sports teams of the Netherlands, especially the national football team, nicknamed "Oranje"
- Oranje, Netherlands, a village in the Dutch province of Drenthe
- The Orange River in South Africa in Dutch and Afrikaans
- M.S. Oranje, a Dutch passenger ship later renamed M.S. Angelina Lauro
- Oranje Zwart, a Dutch hockey club
- Oranje Boven, A Dutch folk song
- In Oranje, a Dutch drama film
- Negeri Van Oranje, a 2015 Indonesian adventure drama film
- Oranje, the name of one of the bastions of the Castle of Good Hope
- De Oranjes (plural of oranje, lit. "the oranges"), a shorthand for the Dutch royal family
- Sometimes used to refer to the Orange Free State
- Oranje, Blanje, Blou, the nickname of the Flag of South Africa (1928–1994)

== See also ==
- Orange (disambiguation), various meanings of an English spelling of Oranje
- Orania (disambiguation), a homophone of Oranje
