= L'Orange =

L'Orange may refer to:

- L'Orange GmbH, a German engineering manufacturing company
- "L'Orange" (song), a 1964 song by Gilbert Bécaud
- L'Orange (music producer) (born 1991), American hip-hop record producer
- Hans Peter L'orange (officer) (1835–1907), Norwegian military officer
- Hans Peter L'Orange (academic) (1903–1983), Norwegian art historian and archaeologist
- Prosper L'Orange (1876–1939), German engineer and inventor

== See also ==
- Lorange, a surname
- Orange (disambiguation)
- Duck à l'orange, a classic French food dish
