= Orange II =

Orange II may refer to:

- Acid orange 7, also known as Orange II
- Council of Orange (529), also known as Orange II
- Orange II (boat), a sailboat

== See also ==
- Orange (disambiguation)
