= Agent Orange (disambiguation) =

Agent Orange is an herbicide and defoliant used by military forces.

Agent Orange may also refer to:

== Music ==
- Agent Orange (album), an album by Sodom
- Agent Orange (band), a punk rock band from Orange County, California
- "Agent Orange", a song by Depeche Mode from the single "Strangelove"
- "Agent Orange", a song by Ski Patrol
- "Agent Orange", a song by Tori Amos from Boys for Pele
- "Agent Orange", a song by Cage Kennylz
- "Agent Orange", a song by Heaven Shall Burn from Wanderer
- "Agent Orange", a song by Limewax
- "Agent Orange", a song by Pharoahe Monch
- "Agent Orange", a song by Slapshock

== Fictional characters ==
- Agent Orange, a Batman family enemy
- Agent Orange (Wildstorm), of the Wildcats in the Wildstorm Universe
- Larfleeze, a DC Comics supervillain also known as Agent Orange
- William Rawlins (Marvel Cinematic Universe), a character from The Punisher also known as Agent Orange

== Other uses ==
- Agent Orange (film), a 2004 silent film
- Agent Orange (video game), a 1987 shoot 'em up game for the Commodore 64

== See also ==
- Donald Trump in popular culture
