= Gregory Iron =

American professional wrestler

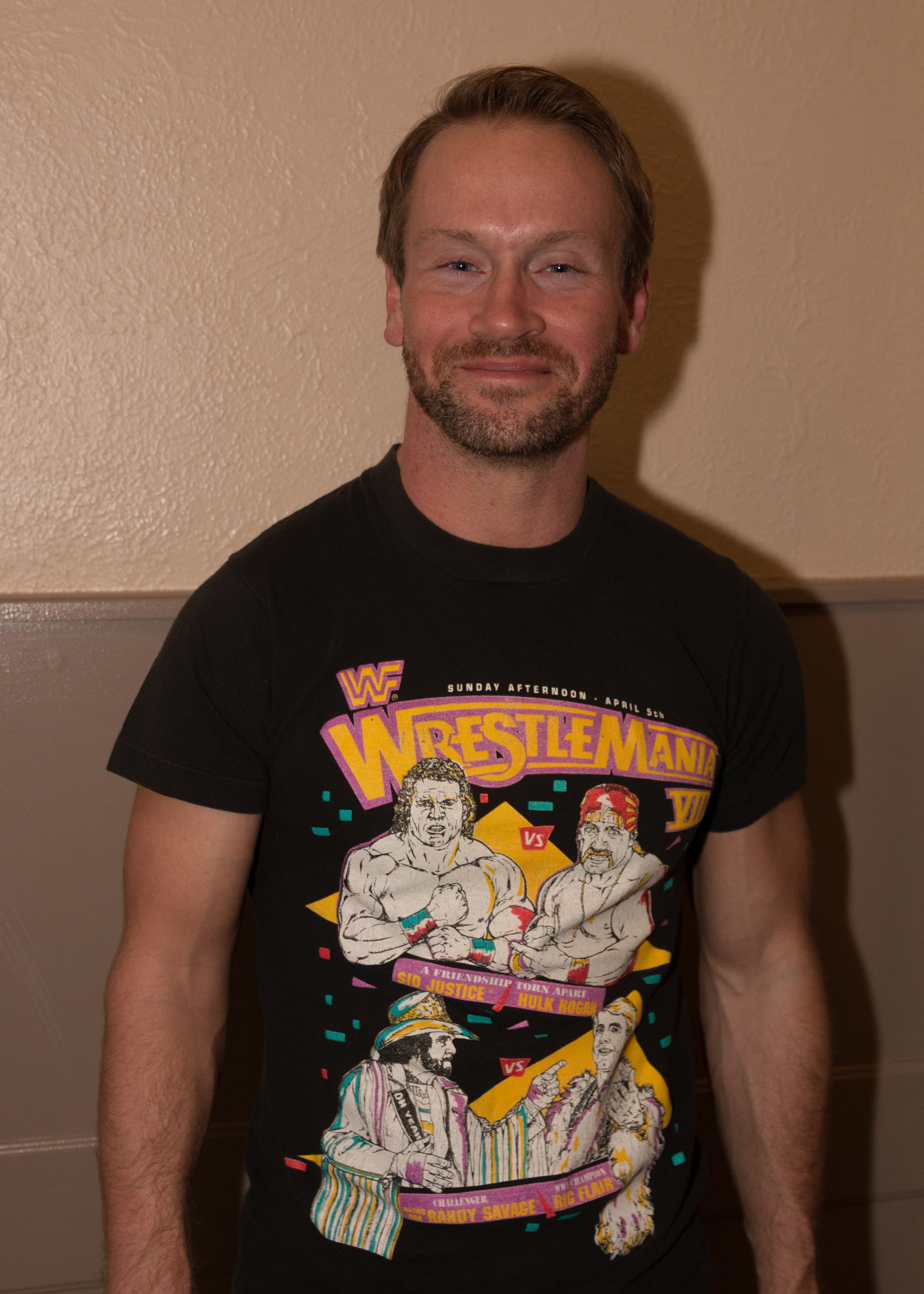
- Iron in 2017

Personal information
- Born: Gregory Allen Smith; October 12, 1986 (age 39) Cleveland, Ohio, U.S.

Professional wrestling career
- Ring name(s): Gregory Iron; Greg Iron
- Billed height: 5 ft 5 in (1.65 m)
- Billed weight: 154 lb (70 kg)
- Trained by: Josh Prohibition; Johnny Gargano; J. T. Lightning
- Debut: July 9, 2006

Gregory Allen Smith (born October 12, 1986), better known by his ring name Gregory Iron, or "GAS" as a play on his actual initials, is an American professional wrestler, who performs regularly in Pro Wrestling Ohio, AAW, Chikara, Smash And Alpha 1 wrestling promotions. After being a guest on Steve Austin's Podcast, Iron decided to start his own podcast, Iron-On Wrestling.

== Early life ==
Gregory Smith was born in 1986 in Cleveland, Ohio. Born one month prematurely and weighing one pound at birth, Smith was diagnosed with cerebral palsy, which has left his right arm withered and with extremely limited range of motion.

As a child he was subject to bullying, which Smith today attributes to other children not being able to understand his disability. He developed his own unique set of coping skills for dealing with bullying, centered on his being willing and able to tell his own story, and to do it in a self-effacing and sometimes humorous manner.

At the same time, his family life left him with little support. While his father, Dwane, worked to support the family, Dwane's wife Gloria became addicted to drugs and would sell off family possessions, and use rent money, to purchase drugs. The couple separated, and Greg, in Gloria's custody, was left to raise his two younger brothers, until Gloria went to jail and Dwane won custody of the boys.

Smith's grandmother, a fan of Hulk Hogan, introduced him to professional wrestling. "She meant a lot to me, and everything I do in wrestling is in her honor."

== Professional wrestling career ==
At first, Iron pursued professional wrestling in the weight room, inventing his own regimen since his right hand would not allow him to execute most lifts in the traditional way. In this way he added 30 pounds of muscle to his frame. In early training with J. T. Lightning, Iron took a great deal of punishment, asking for no pity, and modifying wrestling holds so they could be applied using one arm.

Iron appeared on the very first episode of Pro Wrestling Ohio, televised on Sports Time Ohio, on November 20, 2007, defeating Johnny Gargano in what has often been called an upset. This defeat of Gargano launched Iron's first major feud, as Gargano denied that he could lose to a wrestler with Iron's disability. A brutal attack by Gargano during a PWO taping in February, 2008, left Iron unable to compete for three months. When Iron returned to action, In August, 2008, the feud was settled in a Last Man Standing match, won by Gargano.

No stranger to in-ring injury, in a preshow battle royal, Iron was suplexed on his head several times, giving him a severe concussion, putting him in intensive care for three days. His coming back from such injury, combined with him wrestling with cerebral palsy, has recently caught the attention of several wrestling promotions and fans appreciating his ability to wrestle a good match with his disability.

Iron allows opponents to mock his disability and his right hand, as a means to put him over as a face and his opponent as a heel. "That's what it is there for. You are the bad guy. A horrible person would make fun of my hand. That only gets the crowd more excited and on my side."

Iron is also the longtime tag team partner of Hobo Joe, in the "Homeless Handicapped Connection," billed as mutually overcoming many obstacles to compete. They capped a feud with Sex Appeal (Bobby Beverly and Bobby Shields, accompanied by Nickie Valentino) by enlisting the help of another disabled wrestler, Zach Gowen. With Gowen's assistance, Iron and Hobo defeated Sex Appeal for the PWO Tag Team Championship, Iron's first title.

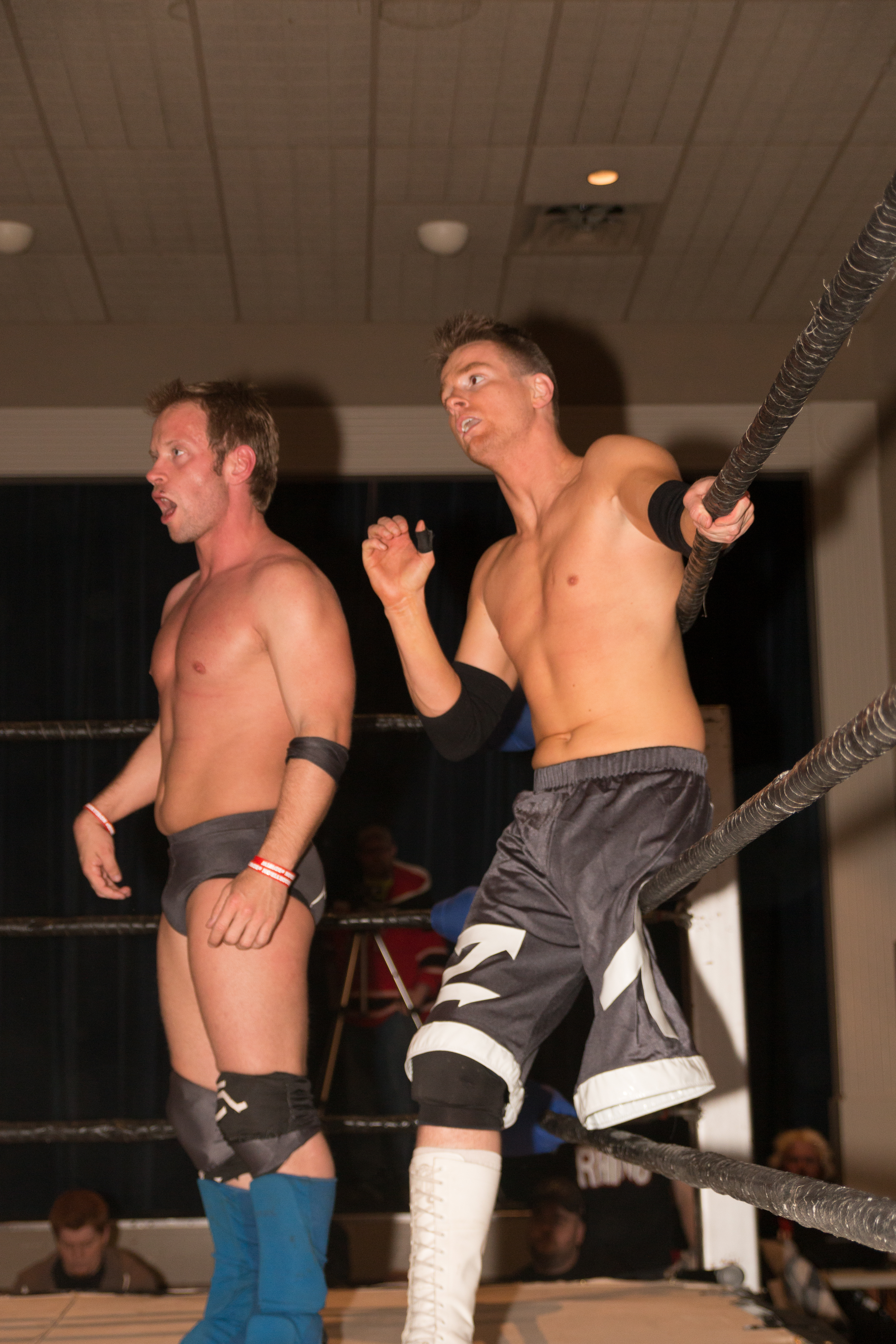
The Handicapped Heroes - Iron (left) and Zach Gowen - at an independent show in April 2014

In 2012, Iron and Gowen would form a tag team calling themselves "The Handicapped Handguns". The two would defeat The Dead Wrestling Society in January 2013 to become the Prime Tag Team Champions.

In March, both Gowen and Iron came to an agreement to change their tag team name to the "Handicapped Heroes" mainly due to the number of school shootings that occurred earlier in the year for they did not want to promote any form of violence.

The next month, Gowen would be kicked-out of a show in the famous Agora Theatre and Ballroom by Prime Wrestling Commissioner, Vic Travagliante. This would leave Iron to defend the tag titles on his own, allowing him to be defeated by The Brotherhood of Mushtachioed Brawlers.

On June 13, Iron lost against his former tag team partner, Matthew Justice at a show in Lisbon, Ohio for the Prime TV Championship.

Iron is perhaps best known as a wrestler for his feud with Gargano, the tag-team defeat of Sex Appeal, and for a Chikara match with Lince Dorado in August, 2010, during the eighth Young Lions Cup - in which "a handicapped underdog [tried] to overcome the bully, and the crowd loved it!"

On July 23, 2011, Iron's career jumped out of relative obscurity: after partnering in a tag match with Colt Cabana, Iron remained in the ring a few moments, and was surprised by Cabana's return to the ring with WWE Champion CM Punk.

Punk had this to say about Iron:

You're awesome! You overcome more than I ever have just waking up every morning. The fact that you became a pro wrestler, I'm only assuming it's because it was something you wanted to do. You didn't let anybody tell you that you couldn't do it ... I saw something special watching you in this ring.

During a live national interview on Fox and Friends, Iron talked about the challenges he's overcome, and issued a challenge of his own: either the WWE adds him to its 2012 Royal Rumble, or Vince McMahon meets Iron in the ring one-on-one. The WWE did not respond to the challenge; and Iron did not appear in the 2012 Rumble.

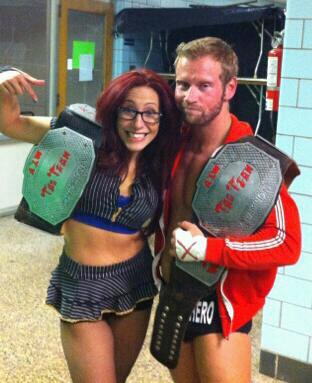
Gregory Iron with Veda Scott

In mid-2012, Iron experienced an unexpected loss of fan support, leading to a tirade at an Absolute Intense Wrestling show, after a tag match in which Iron and Cabana lost to Prohibition and Matt Cross - a match in which Iron was the only one of the four participants not supported by most of the fans.

This led to a feud between Iron and Absolute Intense Wrestling, in which Iron sought the help of Veda Scott as his "legal advisor" - the assistance of Scott resulted in AIW adopting an "accommodation" for Iron's disability: to be defeated, he would have to be pinned by four-count instead of three. During a September card, Iron was pinned by Prohibition for a three-count, but while Scott reminded Prohibition of the new rule, Iron rolled him up for the win.

Iron worked so well with Scott that they formed a tag-team, defeating The Batiri (Obariyon and Kodama) in November 2012 for the AIW Tag Team Championships.

Iron frequently wore a T-shirt similar to the one CM Punk wore throughout the year of 2011 and in the beginning of 2012. It instead had a handicapped symbol in the center rather than the letter X on the back of a hand. On the back of the shirt it said "Best Disabled Wrestler In The World", the nickname Iron has been using for himself since November 2012.

Iron was the subject of a special report by newscaster Chris Van Vliet of Cleveland's WOIO-TV Channel 19, entitled "An Iron Will." This report won an Emmy for Best Single Sports Story in June, 2012.

In 2013, he was unsuccessful in winning his bracket to continue in TNA's Gutcheck Challenge, although he did come in third place. On October 20, 2013, The Handicapped Heroes regained the Prime Tag Team Championship.

In 2019, Iron created 44OH!, a stable of Ohio-based independent wrestlers that would cause havoc in Game Changer Wrestling. On September 2, 2021, Iron defeated "The Deathmatch King" Nick Gage single-handedly to become the new face of GCW.

== Championships and accomplishments ==
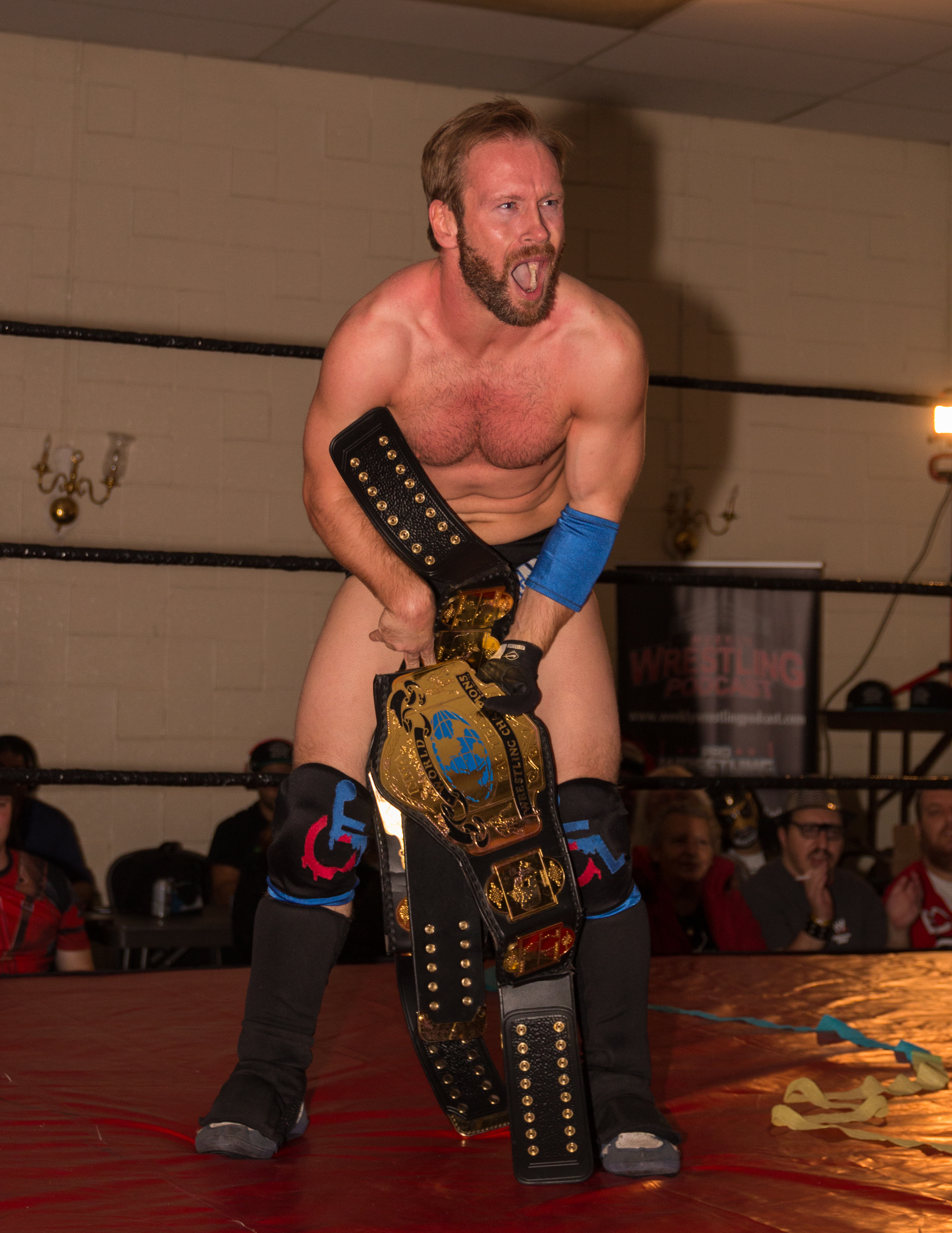
Iron holding the A1 Tag Team Championship

- Absolute Intense Wrestling
  - AIW Intense Championship (1 time)
  - AIW Tag Team Championship (1 time) – with Veda Scott
- Alpha-1 Wrestling
  - A1 Alpha Male Championship (1 time)
  - A1 Tag Team Championship (2 times) – with Rickey Shane Page (1) and Anthony Greene (1)
  - A1 Zero Gravity Championship (1 time)
  - King of Hearts Tournament (2019)
- Championship Wrestling Experience
  - CWE Tag Team Championship (1 time) – with Matthew Justice
- CLASH Wrestling
  - CLASH Tag Team Champions (1 time) – with Zach Gowen
- EMERGE Wrestling
  - EMERGE Championship (1 time)
- Empire State Wrestling
  - ESW Tag Team Championships (1 time) - with RJ City
  - Ilio DiPaolo Memorial Cup (2023, 2024)
- Game Changer Wrestling
  - rSp Championship (1 time)
- H20 Wrestling: Hardcore Hustle Organization
  - H2O Hybrid Championship (1 time)
- Heavy Metal Wrestling
  - HMW Bexar Knuckles Championship (1 time)
- Mr. Chainsaw Productions Wrestling
  - MCPW Tag Team Championship (1 time) – with Zach Gowen
- Ruthless Pro Wrestling
  - RPW Tag Team Championship (1 time, current) – with Zach Thomas and Otis Cogar
- NWA East / Pro Wrestling eXpress
  - NWA East Three Rivers Championship (1 time)
  - NWA East Brass Knuckles Championship (1 time)
  - NWA East/PWX Tag Team Championship (1 time) – with Matthew Justice
- Pro Wrestling All-Stars Of Detroit
  - PWASD Tag Team Championship (1 time) – with Zach Gowen
- Pro Wrestling Illustrated
  - PWI ranked him No. 386 of the top 500 wrestlers in the PWI 500 in 2013
- Pro Wrestling Ohio / Prime Wrestling
  - PWO / Prime Tag Team Championship (3 times) – with Hobo Joe (1) and Zach Gowen (2)
- Pro Wrestling Syndicate
  - PWS Tag Team Championship (1 time) – with Zach Gowen
- Upstate Pro Wrestling
  - UPW 585 Live Championship (1 time)
