= Orania (disambiguation) =

Orania is a town in South Africa.

Orania may also refer to:

- Orania (plant), a genus of palm trees
- Orania (gastropod), a genus of molluscs
- Orania Papazoglou, American mystery writer

== See also ==
- Oranje (disambiguation), a homophone of Orania
- Urania (disambiguation)
