= Orange (name) =

Orange is a surname and a given name.

== Surname ==
- Anthony Orange (born 1988), Canadian football cornerback
- Bud Orange (Robert John Orange; 1926–2007), Canadian politician, civil servant and economist
- Dame Claudia Orange (born 1938), New Zealand historian
- Domonique Orange (born 2004), American football player
- Doyle Orange (born 1951), Canadian football running back
- Grady Orange (1900–1946), American Negro league baseball player
- James Orange (1943–2008), American civil rights activist
- Jason Orange (born 1970), British singer and Take That member
- Leroy Orange (born 1950), American citizen pardoned after wrongful murder conviction
- Linda Orange (1950–2019), American politician
- Maurice Orange (1867–1916), French painter and artist
- Noel Orange (1939–1995), Australian rules footballer
- Rhasaan Orange (born 1975), American actor
- Ursula Orange (1909–1955), British novelist
- Vincent Orange (born 1957), American politician
- William Orange (clergyman) (1889–1966), New Zealand Anglican clergyman
- William Orange (physician) (1883-1916), English physician

== Given name ==
- Orange Cassidy (born 1984), American wrestler
- Orange Ferriss (1814–1894), U.S. Congressman
- Orange Jacobs (1827–1914), U.S. Congressman
- Orange Judd (1822–1892), American agriculturalist, editor, and publisher
- Orange Merwin (1777–1853), U.S. Congressman
- Orange Lawrence (1796-1861), American businessman, namesake of Orangeville, Ontario

== Fictional characters ==
- Orange, a character in the video game Deltarune

== See also ==
- DJ Orange (born 1974), Taiwanese musician
- Eutropius of Orange (died 475), bishop of Orange, France
- Florentius of Orange (died 525), bishop of Orange, France
- House of Orange-Nassau, the royal family of the Kingdom of the Netherlands
