= Orange Cassidy =

American professional wrestler (born 1984)

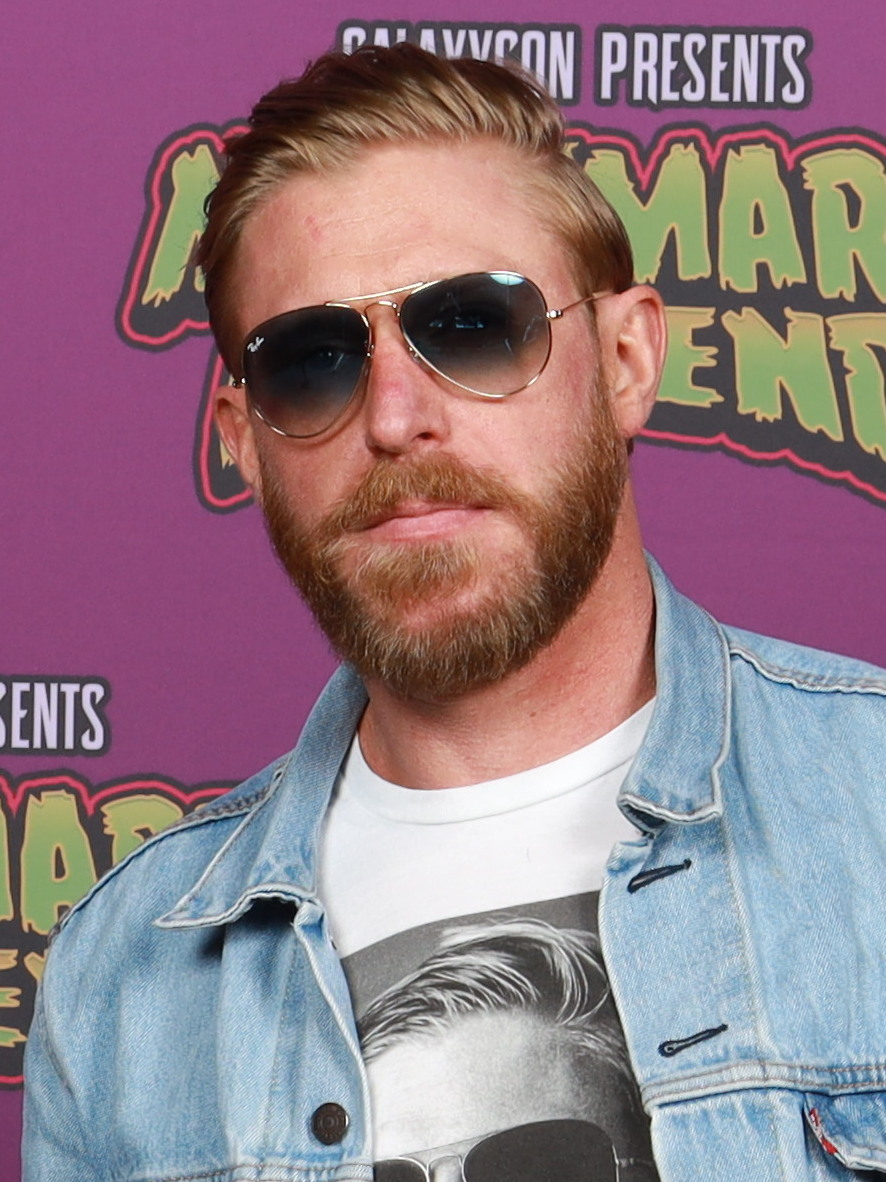
- Cassidy in 2025

Personal information
- Born: James Cipperly; May 4, 1984 (age 42) Stewartsville, New Jersey, U.S.
- Education: New Jersey Institute of Technology (BS)

Professional wrestling career
- Ring name(s): Fire Ant; JC Ryder; Orange Cassidy; Tiff Sanfers
- Billed height: 5 ft 10 in (178 cm) "Whatever"
- Billed weight: 161 lb (73 kg) "Whatever"
- Billed from: The Ant Hill (as Fire Ant) "Wherever"
- Trained by: Chris Hero; Mike Quackenbush; Bryan Wenzel; Skayde
- Debut: March 13, 2004

James Cipperly (born May 4, 1984), better known by his ring name Orange Cassidy, is an American professional wrestler, wrestling trainer and producer. As of August 2019, he is signed to All Elite Wrestling (AEW), where he performs under the epithet "Freshly Squeezed" Orange Cassidy and is a member of The Conglomeration stable.

Prior to signing with AEW, he had previously performed for the Chikara promotion as Fire Ant, a luchador enmascarado (masked professional wrestler). Fire Ant was part of the Colony stable, which won the Campeonatos de Parejas once and Chikara's premier King of Trios tournament twice. During his time in Chikara, he also appeared unmasked as a member of The Gentleman's Club faction, alongside Chuck Taylor and Drew Gulak, and was a trainer at the promotion's Wrestle Factory school. He also wrestled prominently on the independent circuit from 2004 to 2019.

In AEW, Cassidy is a two-time AEW International Champion, with his first reign being the longest in the title's history. (Note: He originally won the title as the AEW All-Atlantic Championship, but during his reign on March 15, 2023, it was renamed to AEW International Championship. AEW originally considered this the start of a new reign for a new title, but in May 2023, the title history was amended to show that it is all the same championship.) He is also a former one-time AEW World Trios Champion with Conglomeration stablemates Roderick Strong and Kyle O'Reilly. Cassidy was also a member of Best Friends, and by extension, a member of Chaos in New Japan Pro-Wrestling (NJPW), representing the stable in the United States.

== Early life and education ==
James Cipperly was born on May 4, 1984, in the Stewartsville section of Greenwich Township, Warren County, New Jersey. He graduated in 2002 from Phillipsburg High School. Five years later, he graduated from the New Jersey Institute of Technology with a Bachelor of Science in Architecture.

== Professional wrestling career ==
=== Early career (2004–2006) ===
Cipperly debuted on March 13, 2004, for the Hanover, Pennsylvania-based Ground Breaking Wrestling (GBW) promotion. Wrestling as "JC Ryder", he teamed with Danny Rage (now known as Dan Champion) as the New Jersey Independent All-Stars. Throughout 2004, Ryder wrestled primarily for GBW; he also made appearances with the Eastern Wrestling Alliance in Baltimore, Maryland and with the Valley Wrestling Alliance in Wilkes-Barre, Pennsylvania. In January 2005, Ryder and Rage defeated Xtreme Pandemonium to win the GBW Tag Team Championship. They held the titles until May 2005 when they lost to CORE and Ian Cross. They won the titles a second time in April 2006 by defeating the Untouchables, dropping them back to the Untouchables that December.

=== Chikara (2005, 2012–2016) ===
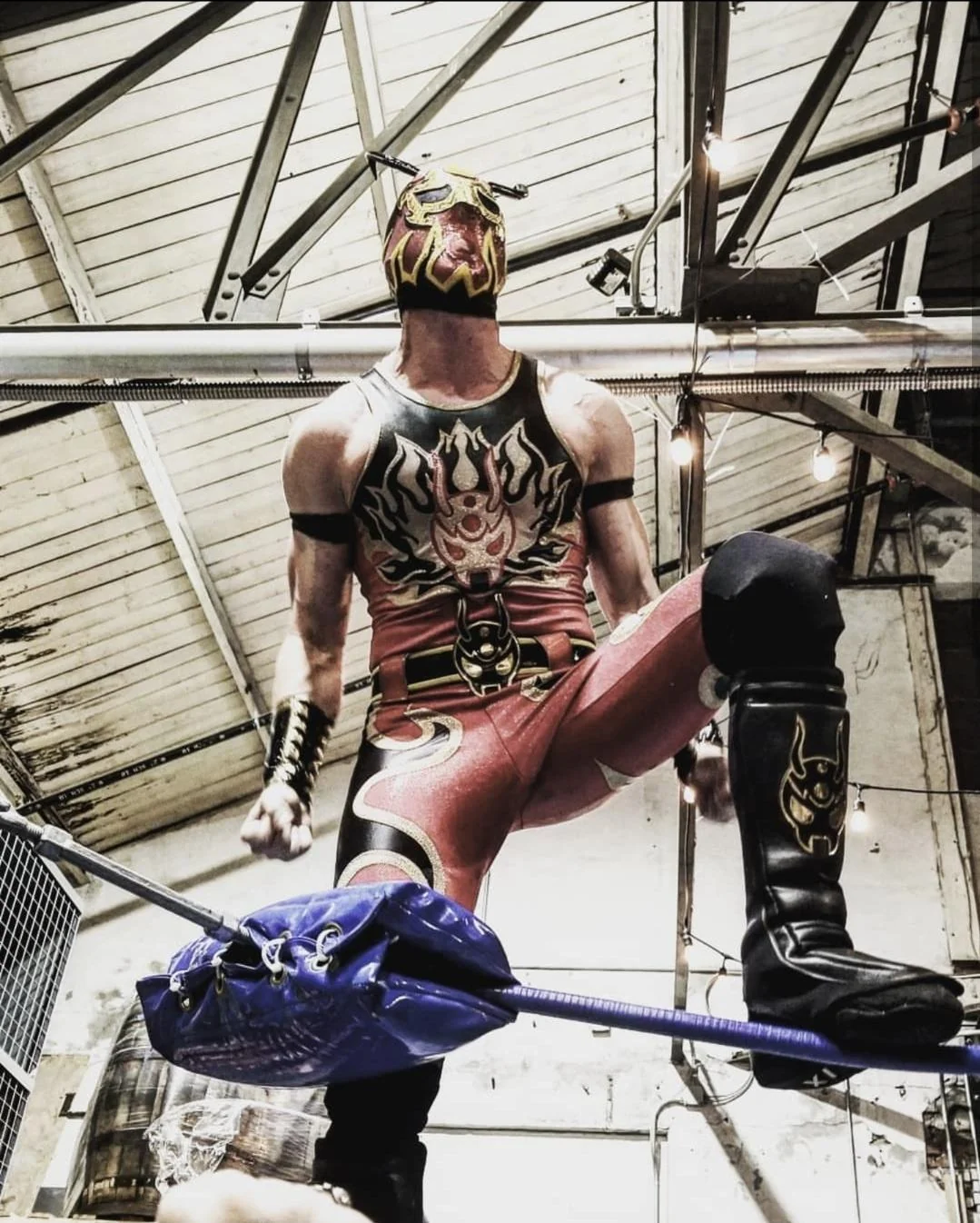
As Fire Ant during a CHIKARA show in 2019

Cipperly (as JC Ryder) debuted in the Pennsylvania-based Chikara promotion in February 2005 at the Tag World Grand Prix. In March and April 2005, he and Danny Rage (as the New Jersey Independent All-Stars) competed in a series of tag team matches. In June 2005, he competed in a qualifying match for the Chikara Young Lions Cup, losing to Rorschach. The following year, he began wrestling under a mask as Fire Ant, the leader of the Colony, a role he continued to portray for the next thirteen years.

In 2012, Cipperly began working unmasked by using the Orange Cassidy ring name. Despite having wrestled under the ring name since 2007, this version of the character was a precursor to his current look in All Elite Wrestling (AEW). The same year, Chuck Taylor formed The Gentlemen's Club, which consisted of Taylor, Cassidy, Drew Gulak and the Swamp Monster. Cassidy made his debut at Live At Road To Ruin Fest, where he was swiftly defeated by Grizzly Redwood. He returned two years later at King of Trios, where the Gentleman's Club were defeated by the Submission Squad. During 2015, the Gentlemen's Club were announced as being part of the Challenge of the Immortals tournament. Cassidy was used in tag team and six-man matches, as the stable won six points, failing to advance to the finals. In 2016, Taylor was involved in a storyline where he kept changing his ring name after matches, in what was part of a larger legal battle with the new owner of the "Chuck Taylor" name, Chuck Taylor™. This culminated at Aniversario: The Lost World in Glasgow, where Taylor (as "Howie Dewitt") defeated Cassidy, who was seconded by Taylor™. At King of Trios, Cassidy and Gulak participated in a tag team gauntlet match, eliminating The Closers and Team Sea Stars, before being eliminated by Cornelius Crummels and Sonny Defarge. At Judgment Day, Team Sea Stars defeated Cassidy and the Swamp Monster, marking the final time that Cipperly would appear in the promotion as Orange Cassidy.

=== All Elite Wrestling (2019–present) ===
==== Rise to prominence (2019–2022) ====
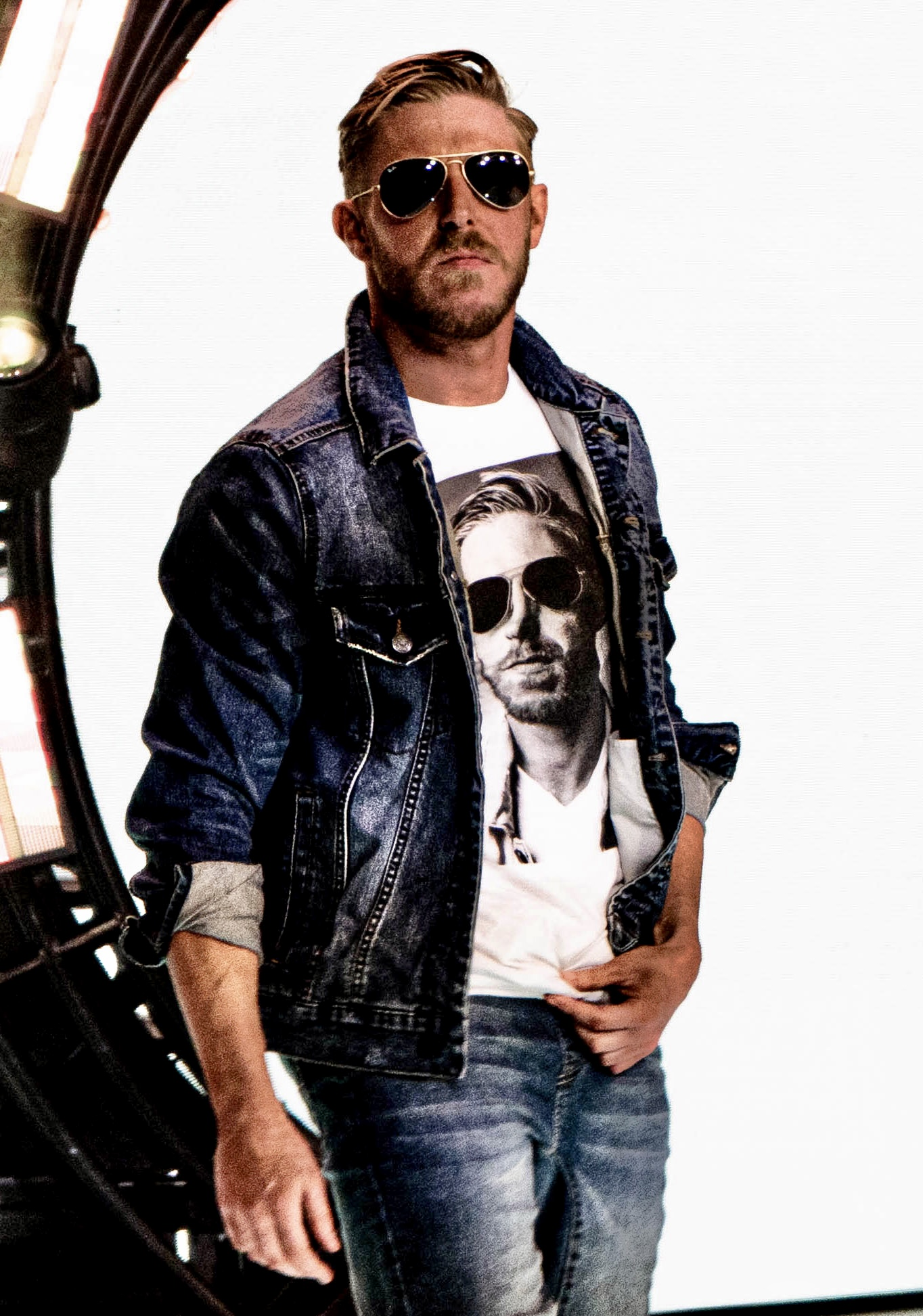
Cassidy making his entrance at Forbidden Door, June 2022

On May 25, 2019, Cassidy made his debut for All Elite Wrestling (AEW), during their inaugural event Double or Nothing, where he entered the Casino Battle Royale late and confronted Tommy Dreamer, before Dreamer threw him out. On August 12, it was announced that Cassidy had signed a contract with AEW. On August 31, at All Out, Cassidy returned and aligned himself with Best Friends (Chuck Taylor and Trent), after saving them from an attack by The Dark Order (Stu Grayson and Evil Uno). Cassidy wrestled his debut match for AEW on the October 30 episode of Dynamite, teaming with Best Friends for a victory over Q. T. Marshall, Alex Reynolds and John Silver in a six-man tag team match.

Cassidy started his first rivalry in AEW with Pac in February 2020, after Cassidy interrupted Pac while he was being interviewed. On February 29, at Revolution, Cassidy was defeated by Pac. Cassidy's performance in the match was praised by critics. On May 23, at Double or Nothing, Cassidy participated in the Casino Ladder Match, but the match was won by Brian Cage. Cassidy next began a feud with Chris Jericho, and was defeated by Jericho during the second night of Fyter Fest on July 8. Cassidy won a rematch on the August 12 episode of Dynamite, and was challenged by Jericho to a Mimosa Mayhem match for All Out, which Cassidy also won. Across September and October, Cassidy challenged for the AEW TNT Championship, but was unsuccessful on each occasion. On November 7, at Full Gear, Cassidy defeated John Silver.

Going into 2021, Cassidy and Best Friends started a feud with Kip Sabian and Miro. On March 7, at Revolution, Cassidy and Chuck Taylor were defeated by Sabian and Miro, but Cassidy and Taylor defeated the team in an Arcade Anarchy match on the March 31 episode of Dynamite. In May, Cassidy received an opportunity for the AEW World Championship. He competed for the championship at Double or Nothing in a three-way match against champion Kenny Omega and Pac, but Omega ended up winning. On September 5, at All Out, Cassidy was on the winning side as Best Friends and Jurassic Express defeated the Hardy Family Office. Afterwards, he was attacked by the returning Butcher, and almost had his head shaved, before the other babyfaces came out to make the save. Later in the night, he accompanied Kris Statlander in her match against Britt Baker. This was notable for a spot where Cassidy broke character, to urge Statlander to beat the count and get back in the ring. On the October 6 episode of Dynamite, Cassidy participated in the seven-man Casino Ladder match for a future shot at the AEW World Championship. The match ended up being won by Adam Page. Cassidy was then put into the AEW World Championship Eliminator Tournament and defeated Powerhouse Hobbs in the first round. He was scheduled to face Jon Moxley in the semi-finals, but Moxley was removed from the tournament due to going into rehabilitation for alcoholism. Moxley was replaced by Miro, who defeated Cassidy.

In November, Cassidy and the rest of the Best Friends stable, began a feud with The Elite, specifically Cassidy with Adam Cole. On the December 22 episode of Dynamite, Cole defeated Cassidy after an interference from the debuting Kyle O'Reilly. On the December 29 episode of Dynamite, Cassidy and Best Friends were defeated by Cole and ReDRagon. On the January 19 episode of Dynamite, Cole and Baker defeated Cassidy and Statlander in a mixed tag team match, with Cole scoring another victory on Cassidy. On the January 26 episode of Dynamite, Cassidy defeated Cole in an Unsanctioned Lights Out match that involved appearances from Best Friends, The Young Bucks, Bobby Fish and the debuting Danhausen. Cassidy would qualify for the "Face of the Revolution" ladder match by defeating Anthony Bowens, but would fail to win the match at Revolution. Days later, it was reported that Cassidy had suffered a shoulder injury during the match, leaving him out of action for months.

Cassidy returned from injury on the June 15 episode of Dynamite, where he interrupted United Empire's assault on FTR and Roppongi Vice, confronting leader Will Ospreay. Soon after, a match was set between the two for Ospreay's IWGP United States Heavyweight Championship at Forbidden Door, which Cassidy lost. Ospreay and Aussie Open continued to beat down Cassidy and Roppongi Vice after the match, only to be stopped and attacked by Katsuyori Shibata. Cassidy continued his title pursuit by challenging Wardlow for the TNT Championship at Fyter Fest.

==== International Champion (2022–2024) ====
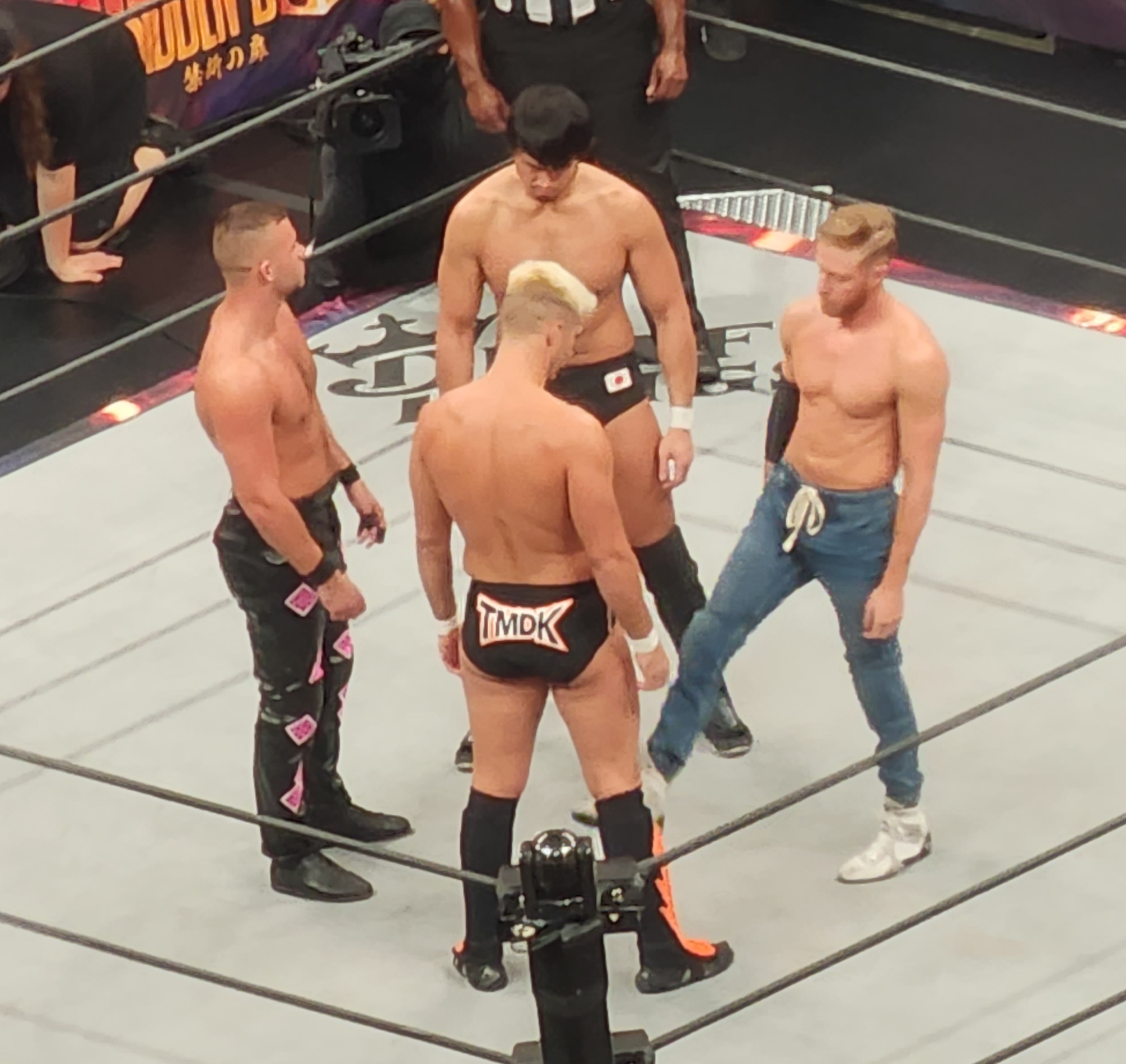
Cassidy hitting his "Kick of Doom" on Zack Sabre Jr. at Forbidden Door, June 2023

Cassidy would then team with Best Friends to participate in a tournament for the new AEW World Trios Championship, defeating The Trustbusters (Ari Daivari, Parker Boudreaux and Slim J) in the first round, but lost to Adam Page and The Dark Order (Alex Reynolds and John Silver) in the semifinal. On the September 7 episode of Dynamite, Cassidy and Best Friends faced Death Triangle (Pac, Rey Fénix and Penta El Zero Miedo) for the vacant World Trios Championship in a losing effort. The following week, on Dynamite, Cassidy attacked longtime rival Pac, setting up a title match between the two for Pac's All-Atlantic Championship at Grand Slam, which Cassidy lost after Pac hit him with a hammer. Cassidy finally defeated Pac in a rematch to win the All-Atlantic Championship on the October 12 episode of Dynamite. This marked his first championship in All Elite Wrestling. On the October 21 episode of Rampage, Cassidy successfully defended his title in his first title defense against Rush and Ten in a triple threat match.

In March 2023, the title would be renamed the AEW International Championship. During his reign, Cassidy successfully defended the championship against various contenders, such as Luchasaurus, Rey Fénix, Katsuyori Shibata, Lee Johnson, Jake Hager, Q. T. Marshall, Trent Seven, Trent Beretta, Kip Sabian, Jay Lethal, Lee Moriarty, Wheeler Yuta, Big Bill, Jeff Jarrett, The Butcher, Dralístico, Buddy Matthews, Bandido, Daniel Garcia, Kyle Fletcher, Swerve Strickland and AR Fox. On June 25 at Forbidden Door, Cassidy successfully defended the AEW International Championship against Zack Sabre Jr., Katsuyori Shibata and Daniel Garcia, who Cassidy pinned, in a four-way match. In July 2023, it was reported that Cassidy had begun working as a producer. At All Out, Cassidy lost the title to Jon Moxley in the main event, ending his reign at a record 326 days.

At WrestleDream, Cassidy teamed with Hook in a four way tag team match against The Young Bucks, Lucha Brothers, and the Gunns for a future AEW World Tag Team Championship match in which they were unsuccessful. At Title Tuesday, Cassidy regained the International Championship by defeating Rey Fénix, becoming the title's first two-time holder. On March 3, 2024 at Revolution, Cassidy lost the International Championship to Roderick Strong, ending his reign at 145 days.

==== The Conglomeration (2024–present) ====
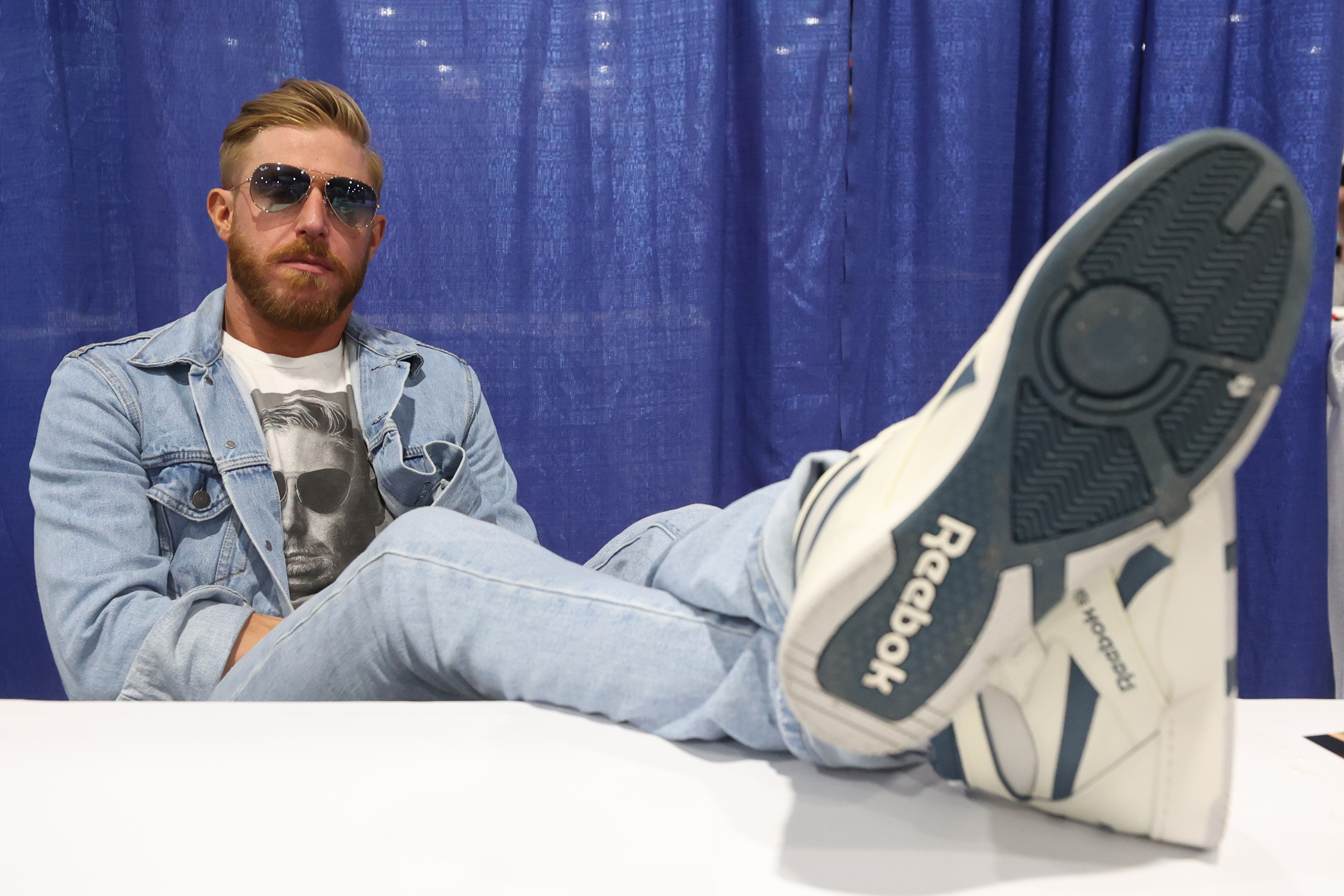
Cassidy at GalaxyCon Richmond, March 2024

On the April 3 episode of Dynamite, Cassidy was hit with a knee strike by Beretta after the duo lost a match to the Young Bucks in the AEW World Tag Team Championship Tournament. On the May 8 episode of Dynamite, Cassidy defeated Berretta. A rematch was scheduled for Double or Nothing, where Cassidy was once again victorious. During this time, Cassidy was being scouted by Don Callis to join his eponymously named stable, The Don Callis Family. On the May 29 episode of Dynamite, Cassidy would reject the offer only to find that Beretta was actually the one being scouted. On the June 6 episode of Dynamite, Statlander would attack Cassidy during an exchange between him and Beretta.

On the June 8 episode of Collision, Zack Sabre Jr. would release a video challenging Cassidy to a match at Forbidden Door citing their unfinished business from the prior year's event. During this time, Cassidy would find himself teaming with new allies Mark Briscoe and Kyle O'Reilly as "The Conglomeration". They would compete in multi-man matches against Sabre as well as members of the Don Callis Family and Strong's Undisputed Kingdom. Cassidy would go on to lose the match against Sabre at Forbidden Door. On September 7 at All Out, Cassidy failed to capture the AEW Continental Championship in a four-way match, which Kazuchika Okada won and retained the title. On October 30 at Fright Night Dynamite, after failing to save Chuck Taylor from an attack by the Death Riders, Cassidy challenged Jon Moxley to a match for the AEW World Championship at Full Gear on November 23. At Full Gear, Cassidy failed to capture the title from Moxley. On December 28 at Worlds End, Cassidy once again failed to capture the title from Moxley in a four-way match, also involving Adam Page and Jay White.

On the February 19, 2025 episode of Dynamite, Cassidy defeated Strong to earn a shot at the International Championship against Konosuke Takeshita, but failed to win the title the following week. In April 2025, it was reported that Cassidy suffered a possible torn pectoral, putting him out of action for an undisclosed amount of time. Cassidy returned from injury on the September 24 episode of Dynamite, teaming with stablemates Mark Briscoe and Hologram to defeat the Don Callis Family (Hechicero, Kazuchika Okada, and Konosuke Takeshita). On November 12 at Blood & Guts, Cassidy teamed with Darby Allin, Mark Briscoe, Kyle O'Reilly, and Roderick Strong in a Blood and Guts match, where they defeated the Death Riders (Jon Moxley, Claudio Castagnoli, Wheeler Yuta, Daniel Garcia, and Pac). On November 24, Cassidy was announced as a participant in the 2025 Continental Classic, where he was placed in the Blue League. Cassidy finished the tournament with 6 points but failed to advance to the semi-finals.

In early 2026, Casisdy along with Darby Allin began feuding with The Dogs (David Finlay, Clark Connors, and Gabe Kidd). At Revolution on March 15, Cassidy, Allin, and Roderick Strong defeated The Dogs in a tornado trios match. At Dynasty on April 12, The Conglomeration (Cassidy, Strong, and a returning Kyle O'Reilly) defeated The Dogs to win the AEW World Trios Championship. On the July 29 episode of Dynamite, The Conglomeration lost their Trios Championship to The Demand (Ricochet, Bishop Kaun, and Toa Liona), ending their reign at 108 days.

== Professional wrestling style and persona ==
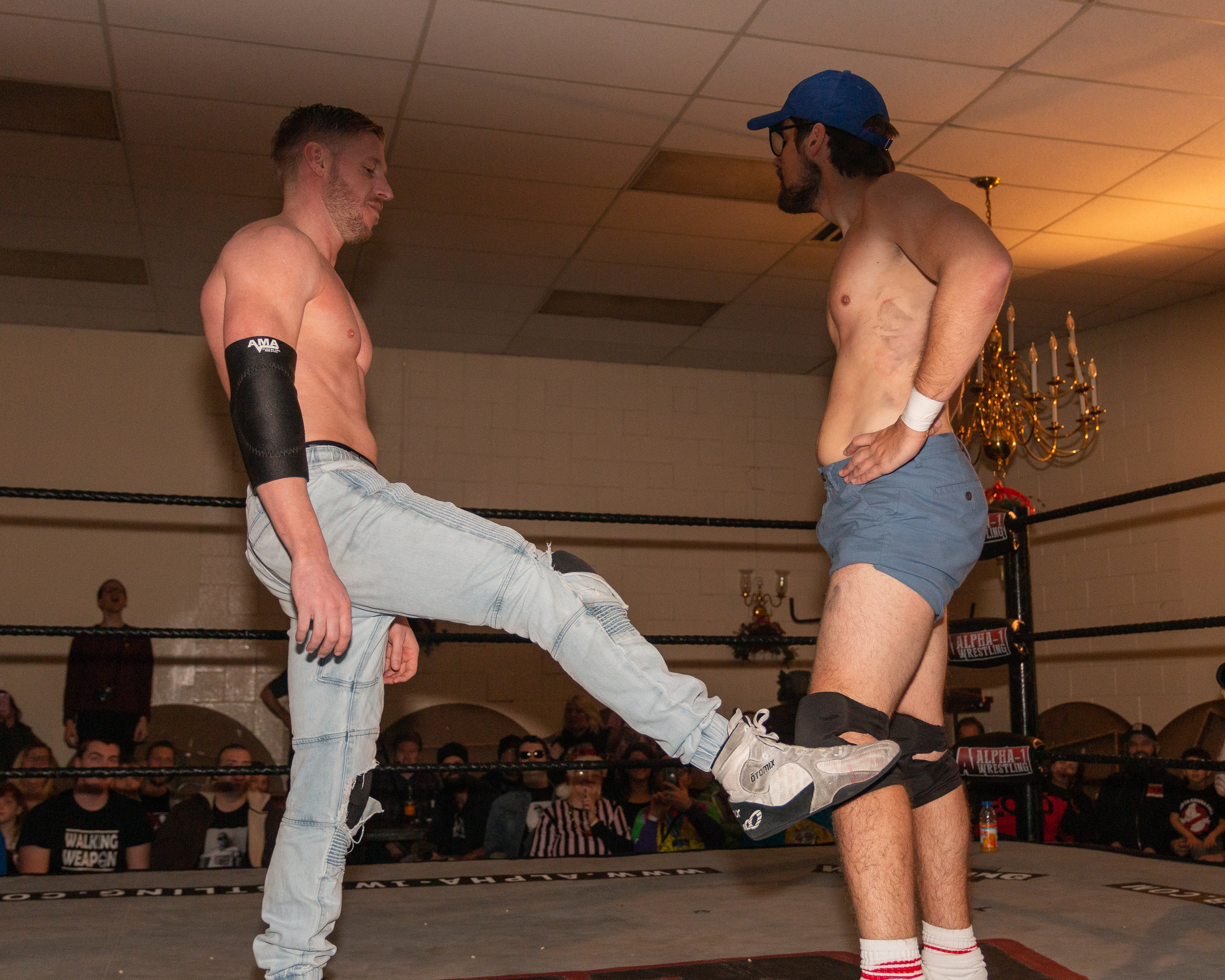
Orange Cassidy hitting one of his signature "Kicks of Doom" on Dan the Dad

Having wrestled for over a decade and taking his current ring name around 2007, Cipperly's "Orange Cassidy" gimmick is based upon a single scene in Wet Hot American Summer, involving the character portrayed by Paul Rudd. In addition, his entrance music on the independent circuit (and later in All Elite Wrestling), is "Jane" by Jefferson Starship which was the song used in the opening credits of the aforementioned film. He has also been compared to the unnamed character portrayed by Ryan Gosling in Drive. Cipperly stated that he created the gimmick to differentiate himself from other wrestlers better than him, as well as a "middle finger to professional wrestling". He explained his character's motivations as "If I have to wrestle, I'll wrestle. [...] It's like one of those things, you have a job, you're good at it, but you know, do you really wanna?"

He is commonly referred to as "The King of Sloth Style" due to his slow movement and lackadaisical attacks. One of his signature moves is very light taps to the opponent's shins, sometimes dubbed the "Slow Motion Kick" or the "Kicks of Doom". He is also known for his non sequitur promos, such as winning a debate with Chris Jericho by discussing his knowledge of climate change instead of wrestling.

After his debut for All Elite Wrestling in 2019, he has been referred to as "the most popular wrestler in AEW" by some wrestling writers. AEW founder and co-owner Tony Khan said that the WarnerMedia executives (the parent company of TBS and TNT, the networks on which AEW's programming airs) love his character. ESPN named him "wrestling's male breakout star of 2020."

Cassidy uses Where Is My Mind? by alternative rock band Pixies as his entrance music in AEW.

== Other media ==
In 2022, Cassidy along with Chuck Taylor and Kris Statlander appeared in the third season of Netflix's Floor is Lava.

== Filmography ==
Television
Year	Title	Role	Notes
2022	Floor Is Lava	Himself	

Web series
Year	Title	Role	Notes
2020–2022	Being The Elite	Himself	Series regular

Video game appearances
Year	Title	Role	Notes
2023	AEW Fight Forever	Himself	

== Championships and accomplishments ==
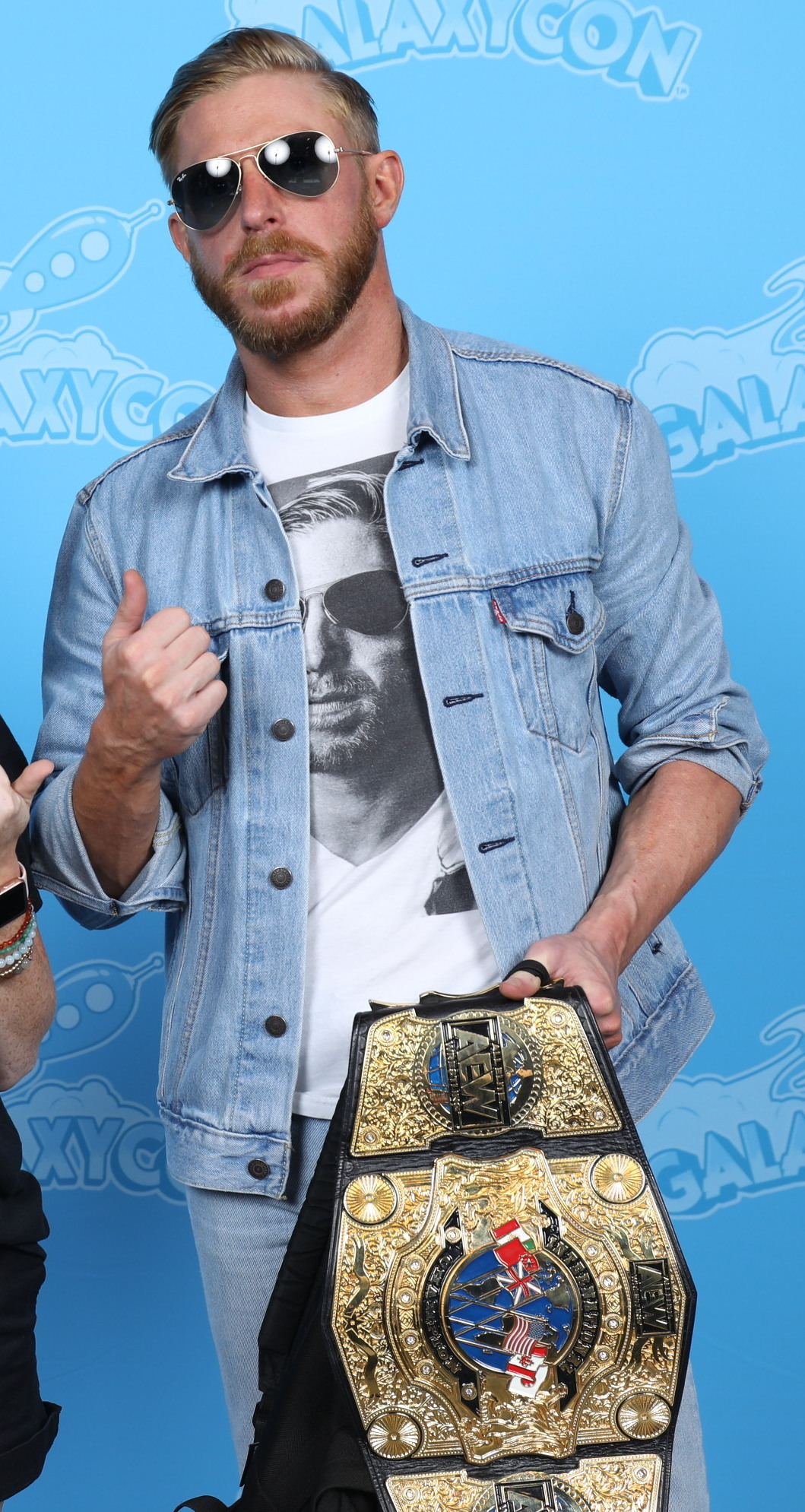
Cassidy is a two-time AEW International Champion

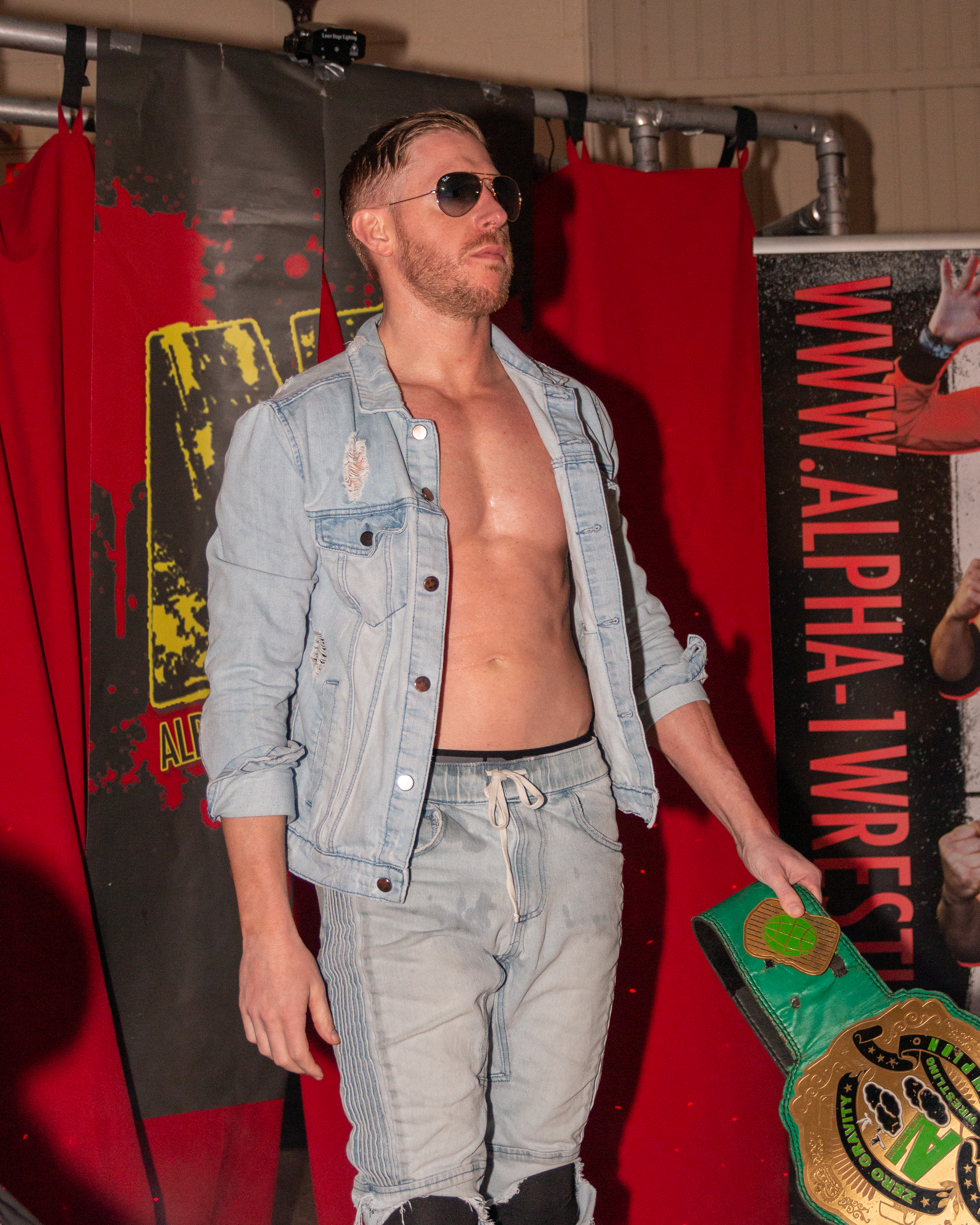
Cassidy with the A1 Zero Gravity Championship belt

- All Elite Wrestling
  - AEW International Championship (2 times) (Note: When Cassidy won the title on October 12, 2022, the title was named the AEW All-Atlantic Championship. On March 15, 2023, the title was rebranded the AEW International Championship)
  - AEW World Trios Championship (1 time) – with Kyle O'Reilly and Roderick Strong
  - Casino Tag Team Royale (2023) – with Danhausen
- Alpha-1 Wrestling
  - A1 Zero Gravity Championship (1 time)
- Chikara
  - Campeonatos de Parejas (1 time) – with Soldier Ant
  - Young Lions Cup VI – (1 time)
  - King of Trios (2011, 2018) – with Green Ant and Soldier Ant (1) – with Green Ant (II) and Thief Ant (1)
  - Tag World Grand Prix (2008) – with Soldier Ant
- DDT Pro-Wrestling
  - Ironman Heavymetalweight Championship (1 time)
- Forza Lucha!
  - Forza Lucha Cup Championship (1 time)
  - Forza Lucha Cup (2014)
- Ground Breaking Wrestling
  - GBW Tag Team Championship (2 times) – with Danny Rage
- F1RST Wrestling
  - F1RST Wrestling Uptown VFW Championship (1 time)
- IndependentWrestling.TV
  - Independent Wrestling Championship (2 times)
- Pro Wrestling Illustrated
  - Most Popular Wrestler of the Year (2020)
  - Ranked No. 8 of the top 500 singles wrestlers in the PWI 500 in 2023
- WrestleJam
  - WrestleJam Championship (1 time)
- Wrestling Observer Newsletter
  - Best Gimmick (2020)
- Other Championships
  - Adult Swim Booty Championship (1 time, current; inaugural) – with Willow Nightingale

=== Luchas de Apuestas record ===
Winner (wager)	Loser (wager)	Location	Event	Date	Notes
Fire Ant and Soldier Ant (masks)	Chuck Taylor and Icarus (hair)	Philadelphia, Pennsylvania	Aniversario Yang	May 24, 2009	
Orange Cassidy (hair)	Jack Evans (hair)	Rochester, New York	AEW Rampage	October 1, 2021	
Orange Cassidy and Toni Storm (hair)	Wheeler Yuta and Marina Shafir (hair) (Note: Only Yuta was required to shave his hair.)	Sydney, Australia	Grand Slam Australia	February 14, 2026	
