= Orange, Coshocton County, Ohio =

Unincorporated community in Ohio, U.S.

Coordinates: 40°17′17″N 81°40′58″W

Orange is an unincorporated community in Coshocton County, in the U.S. state of Ohio.

== History ==
Orange was laid out in 1839. In 1853, the post office in Evansburg (an extinct town) was moved to Orange, but the post office kept the name Evansburg. The Evansburg (Orange) post office closed in 1907.
