= Orangism =

Orangism, with supporters known as Orangists, may refer to one of several political movements:

- Orangism (Dutch Republic), a loosely defined current in support of a mixed constitution (until 1795)
- Orangism (Kingdom of the Netherlands), a liberal-monarchist trend (starting 1860s), distinct from Orange fever, Dutch mass enthusiasm during national sports events
- Orangism (Belgium), supported the re-unification of Belgium and the Netherlands in a United Kingdom
- Orangism (Luxembourg), supported the personal union of the Netherlands and the grand-duchy of Luxembourg
- Orangism (Northern Ireland), whose followers are more usually known as Orangemen
