= Orange City =

Orange City may refer to:

- Orange City, Florida, United States
- Orange City, Iowa, United States
- City of Orange, New Jersey, United States
- Orange, California, United States
- Orange, Vaucluse, France
- Nagpur, Maharashtra, India, nicknamed "Orange City"
- Bhawani Mandi, Rajasthan, India, nicknamed "Orange City"
- Hiwarkhed (Orange City), Amravati District, Maharashtra, India
- Warud, Maharashtra, India, nicknamed "Orange City"
