= Orange River (disambiguation) =

Orange River is a river in South Africa.

Orange River may also refer to:

- Orange River (Florida)
- Orange River (Jamaica)
- Orange River (Maine)
- Orange River Colony
- Orange River Sovereignty
- Orange River Convention
- Vicariate Apostolic of Orange River
- Orange River Rafters, South Africa field hockey club
