= Agent Orange (video game) =

1987 video game

- Publishers: A&F Software
- Platforms: Amstrad CPC, Commodore 64, ZX Spectrum
- Release: EU: January 1987
- Genre: Scrolling shooter
- Mode: Single-player

Agent Orange is a horizontally scrolling shooter released by A&F Software in January 1987 for the Amstrad CPC, Commodore 64, and ZX Spectrum.

== Gameplay ==
Tasked with cultivating crops on eight alien planets in order to fund space travel, the player must combat rival alien farmers whilst planting and harvesting crops for income; the ultimate goal is to reach the final planet and take possession of a batch of alien weedkiller called agent orange. Play begins with the player's mothership heading to the first planet, the mothership displays the number and strength of enemy farmers on the planet. The mothership contains seeds and 8 smaller daughterships; seeds generate crops when planted and daughterships are combination fighter craft and planters. When ready the player's first daughtership is launched onto the planet's surface, it is this vehicle which the player directly controls and each represents the player's 'lives'. The daughtership can move in eight directions, the play area scrolls left and right from the mothership. Alien farmers attack while the daughtership flies around the planet's surface, initially they can be destroyed easily but this becomes more difficult as play progresses.

Aliens plant crops of their own, which act as weeds and choke the player's own crops, and take up some of the planet surface's limited space suitable for crop planting. These weeds can be destroyed by the player firing on them. Indigenous weeds also spread across planet surfaces, unlike alien crops these cannot be razed by the player's weapon fire. The daughtership can plant crops if the player has seed available, when planted seeds grow through three coloured stages, once at the third stage they can be harvested; failure to harvest crops in time will result in them withering. Crops behave in a lifelike fashion; too many or too few crops in an area stunts their growth, players must find the optimum density of crop. The daughtership can hold a limited amount of crop units, indicated by a bar on the screen which fills when crops are collected, collecting more than the ship can carry will result in a crash landing and the destruction of the vessel. The mothership also has limited cargo space, once the mothership's hold is full the vessel must return home so that the crops can be sold. The mothership cannot ascend from the planet's surface until all alien aggressors have been eliminated, forcing the player to destroy the enemy before escaping. Upon returning home the harvested crops, remaining seeds and remaining daughterships are converted into cash, allowing the player to purchase new daughterships with improved shields to defend against rivals. At this point the player can return to the same planet, where additional alien farmers will now be present, or move onto the next and more difficult planet. Each new planet features more powerful and numerous alien ships.

== Reception ==
The Commodore 64 version was rated as being very poor by Julian Rignall and Paul Sumner of Zzap!64 magazine, with an overall review score of 37%. Sumner stated that despite the game's graphics; which were rated comparatively higher in the review than other aspects of the game, that underneath it is "a very simple and unchallenging shoot 'em up". Rignall drew comparisons with other similar games being released at the time, stating "I'm sick to death with crummy two-way scrolling shoot 'em ups - why do companies keep churning them out onto the market?" He continued by comparing the game's graphics in comparison to gameplay as "gift wrapping an empty cardboard box", describing the title's gameplay as lacking the essentials necessary for an exciting shoot 'em up game.
