= Orange Lake =

Orange Lake may refer to:

- Orange Lake, Florida, an unincorporated community
  - Orange Lake (Florida), the body of water for which the above community is named
- Orange Lake, New York, a hamlet and census-designated place
  - Orange Lake (New York), the body of water for which the above community is named
