= Orange People =

Orange People may refer to:

- La Gente Naranja (Spanish: The Orange People), a Florida-based Ecuadorian Rock en Espanol music band
- "Orange People", a track on the album Surface Paradise (2009) by Melbourne band Root!
- Orange People (film) (2013), originally titled Anashim Ketumim, a film by Israeli director Hanna Azoulay Hasfari
- Rajneesh movement, the followers of which have been called Orange People because of the color of their clothes
- Tapuz or Tapuz Anashim (Hebrew: Orange People), an Israeli Web portal

== See also ==
- Carotenosis, a disease that causes orange skin color
- List of people from Orange County, California
- Orange Walk People's Stadium
- Orangemen (disambiguation)
