= Orange Township =

Orange Township may refer to:

== Illinois ==
- Orange Township, Clark County, Illinois
- Orange Township, Knox County, Illinois
- Orange Township was a former name of DeKalb Township

== Indiana ==
- Orange Township, Fayette County, Indiana
- Orange Township, Noble County, Indiana
- Orange Township, Rush County, Indiana

== Iowa ==
- Orange Township, Black Hawk County, Iowa
- Orange Township, Clinton County, Iowa
- Orange Township, Guthrie County, Iowa
- East Orange Township, Sioux County, Iowa

== Kansas ==
- Orange Township, Lincoln County, Kansas, in Lincoln County, Kansas
- Orange Township, Pawnee County, Kansas, in Pawnee County, Kansas

== Michigan ==
- Orange Township, Ionia County, Michigan
- Orange Township, Kalkaska County, Michigan

== Minnesota ==
- Orange Township, Douglas County, Minnesota

== North Dakota ==
- Orange Township, Adams County, North Dakota

== Ohio ==
- Orange Township, Ashland County, Ohio
- Orange Township, Carroll County, Ohio
- Orange Township, Cuyahoga County, Ohio
- Orange Township, Delaware County, Ohio
- Orange Township, Hancock County, Ohio
- Orange Township, Meigs County, Ohio
- Orange Township, Shelby County, Ohio

== Pennsylvania ==
- Orange Township, Pennsylvania
