= Orange Bay =

Orange Bay may refer to:

== Places ==
Canada

- Orange Bay (Newfoundland and Labrador)

Chile

- Orange Bay, a bay in Hardy Peninsula, Hoste Island

Jamaica

- Orange Bay (Hanover Parish)
- Orange Bay (Portland Parish)

== Other uses ==
- Orange Bay (horse) (foaled 1972), a thoroughbred racehorse and sire
