= New =

New or NEW may refer to:

- Novelty, the quality of being new

== Music ==
- New, singer of K-pop group The Boyz
- New (album), by Paul McCartney, 2013
  - "New" (Paul McCartney song), 2013
- New (EP), by Regurgitator, 1995
- "New" (Daya song), 2017
- "New" (No Doubt song), 1999
- "new", a song by Loona from the 2017 single album Yves
- "The New", a song by Interpol from the 2002 album Turn On the Bright Lights
- "The New", a song by Moka Only and Chief from the 2011 album Crickets

== Transportation ==
- Lakefront Airport, New Orleans, U.S., IATA airport code NEW
- Newcraighall railway station, Scotland, station code NEW

== Other uses ==
- New (film), a 2004 Tamil movie
- New (surname), an English family name
- NEW (TV station), in Australia
- new and delete (C++), in the computer programming language
- Net economic welfare, a proposed macroeconomic indicator
- Net explosive weight, also known as net explosive quantity
- Network of enlightened Women, an American organization
- Newar language, ISO 639-2/3 language code new
- Next Entertainment World, a South Korean media company
- Northeast Wrestling, a professional wrestling promotion
- Edel New, a South Korean paraglider design
- New!, a British magazine

== See also ==
- Brand New (disambiguation)
- GNU (disambiguation)
- Neo (disambiguation)
- New River (disambiguation)
- News (disambiguation)
- Nu (disambiguation)
