= Wildebeest (disambiguation) =

The wildebeest is a genus of African antelope.

Wildebeest may also refer to:

- Wildebeest (character), several characters in DC Comics
- The Vickers Vildebeest, a 20th-century torpedo bomber
- Baby Wildebeest, a fictional character in DC Comics' New Titans series
- Wildebeest (ride), a water slide at Holiday World & Splashin' Safari in Santa Claus, Indiana
- Wildebeest chess, a variant of chess created by R. Wayne Schmittberger

== See also ==
- Gnu (disambiguation)
