= GNU (disambiguation) =

GNU is a Unix-like computer operating system developed by the GNU Project.

GNU or gnu may also refer to:

== Science and technology ==
- Gnu, or wildebeests, a genus of antelopes
- GNU Project, a free software, mass collaboration project
- 9965 GNU, an asteroid

== Organisations ==
- Government of national unity, a coalition government during a national emergency
- Government of National Unity (Libya), a transitional unitary government during 2021
- Government of National Unity (South Africa), a constitutional arrangement
- Grand National Union of Kenya, a Kenyan political party
- Great Northern Union, a US men's barbershop chorus
- Gyeongsang National University, a university in South Korea

== Other uses ==
- Gnau language, by ISO 639-3 language code
- Gnu Snowboards, produced by Mervin Manufacturing in the US
- Gnu Butte, a butte in British Columbia, Canada
- Goodnews Airport, Alaska, US, by IATA and FAA LID codes
- Sopwith Gnu, a 1910s British touring biplane
- "The Gnu", a song by Flanders and Swann
- A fairy chess piece used in Wildebeest chess
- The Gnus, an upper-school student newspaper of Sandy Spring Friends School
- The Gnu Theatre, a Los Angeles theatre designed and built by Jeff Seymour
- The Gnu, a pub in North Newbald, England
- Gary Gnu, fictional character in The Great Space Coaster

== See also ==
- Gnu goat, or Takin, a goat-antelope found in the eastern Himalayas
- Gnu High, an album by Canadian musician Kenny Wheeler
- GNU license (disambiguation)
