= Northeast Wrestling =

American professional wrestling promotion

- Acronym: NEW
- Founded: December 9, 1995
- Style: American Wrestling
- Headquarters: Newburgh, New York, United States
- Founder: Michael Lombardi
- Formerly: NWA Northeast (1996-2000)
- Website: Official Website

Northeast Wrestling (NEW) is an independent professional wrestling promotion based in the Northeastern United States and has promoted events since 1996. It is currently owned and operated by promoter Mike Lombardi and is one of the top independent wrestling promotions in the Northeast.

== Championships ==
=== Active Titles ===
Championship	Current champion(s)	Reign	Date won	Days held	Location	Notes	Ref.
NEW Heavyweight Championship	Matt Taven	3	December 17, 2022	1,420	Bethany, CT	Won a tournament after former champion, Traevon Jordan, relinquished belt due to injury	
NEW Live Championship	KC Navarro	1	August 13, 2022	1,546	Bethany, CT	Defeated J. T. Dunn on Destiny.	
NEW Tag Team Championship	Waves and Curls (Traevon Jordan and Jaylen Brandyn)	1	February 19, 2022	1,721	Bethany, CT	Defeated Club Cam (Cam Zagami and Antonio Zambrano) at The Future is Now.	

=== Former Championships ===
Championship	Date of entry	First champion(s)	Date retired	Last champion(s)	Years active
NWA Northeast Junior Heavyweight Championship; NEW Light Heavyweight Championship	December 12, 1995	Johnny Handsome	2000	Mike Quackenbush	5
NWA Northeast Television Championship	February 1998	John Diamond	July 9, 1999	Juan Xaviar	1
NEW United States Championship	-	Brother Devon	-	-	-

=== Other accomplishments ===
Accomplishment	Latest winner(s)	Date won	Location	Notes
King of Bethany	Brian Anthony	Dec. 17, 2017	Bethany, Connecticut	

== NEW Tag Team Championship ==
NEW Tag Team Championship

Details
- Promotion: Northeast Wrestling
- Date established: November 1, 2014
- Current champions: Waves and Curls (Traevon Jordan and Jaylen Brandyn)
- Date won: February 19, 2022
Statistics
- First champions: The Dredded Dead (Bull Dredd and Ron Zombie)
- Most reigns: As Tag Team (2 reigns): Adrenaline Rush (Daniel Evans & Keith Youngblood); The Battle Brothers (Anthony Battle & Chris Battle); The Royal Court (Brian Anthony & Daniel Evans); As Individual (4 reigns): Daniel Evans
- Longest reign: InZanely Rude (Zane Bernardo and RJ Rude) (693 days)
- Shortest reign: The Royal Court (Brian Anthony and Daniel Evans) (7 days)

=== Reigns ===
Key
No.	Overall reign number
Reign	Reign number for the specific team—reign numbers for the individuals are in parentheses, if different
Days	Number of days held
<1	Reign lasted less than a day
+	Current reign is changing daily

No.	Champion	Championship change			Reign statistics		Notes	Ref.
No.	Champion	Date	Event	Location	Reign	Days	Notes	Ref.
1	The Dredded Dead (Bull Dredd and Ron Zombie)	November 1, 2014	Army of One	Bethany, CT	1	160	Justin Dredd and Ron Zombie defeated The Battle Brothers (Anthony Battle and Chris Battle) and The Arrogation (Dan The Man and Vladimir Joseph) in a three-way match to become the inaugural champions. During their reign, Justin was also recognized as Bull Dredd	
2	The Battle Brothers (Anthony Battle and Chris Battle)	April 10, 2015	The Future is Now	Danbury, CT	1	183	This was a no disqualification match.	
3	Team Friendship (Mark Shurman and Scotty Slade)	October 10, 2015	The Hunt For Gold October	Bethany, CT	1	210		
4	Frankie Arion and Vinny Marseglia	May 7, 2016	Zombie's Last Stand	Waterbury, CT	1	35		
5	So Over (Jimmy Preston and Mark Shurman (2))	June 11, 2016	The Big Bethany Bash	Bethany, CT	1	281		
6	The Battle Brothers (Anthony Battle and Chris Battle)	March 19, 2017	Kingdom In Chaos	Waterbury, CT	2	68	This was a four-way elimination match also involving Adrenaline Rush (Keith Youngblood & Daniel Evans) and NOW (Hale Collins & Vik Dalishus)	
7	NOW (Hale Collins and Vik Dalishus)	May 26, 2017	Spring Slam Tour: Newburgh	Newburgh, NY	1	113	This was a steel cage match	
8	The Kingdom (T. K. O'Ryan and Vinny Marseglia (2))	September 16, 2017	Destiny	Bethany, CT	1	76		
9	Adrenaline Rush (Daniel Evans and Keith Youngblood)	December 1, 2017	Holiday Havoc	Waterbury, CT	1	91	This was a three-way ladder match also involving NOW (Hale Collins & Vik Dalishus)	
10	Cam Zagami and Robbie E	March 2, 2018	Wrestlefest XXII	Waterbury, CT	1	162		
11	Adrenaline Rush (Daniel Evans and Keith Youngblood)	August 11, 2018	Heat Wave	Bethany, CT	2	70	This was a Texas tornado match.	
12	The Royal Court (Anthony Battle (3), Brian Anthony and Daniel Evans (3))	October 20, 2018	Destiny	Bethany, CT	1	188	Initially, Anthony Battle and Brian Anthony defeated Daniel Evans and Keith Youngblood to win the titles. However, Evans is somehow recognized as a champion with Battle and Anthony by the freebird rule. His reign is recognized to have been started the same day he lost the titles alongside Evans.	
13	Jerry Lawler and Keith Youngblood (3)	April 26, 2019	Wrestlefest XXIII	Danbury, CT	1	113		
14	The Royal Court (Brian Anthony (2) and Daniel Evans (4))	August 17, 2019	Under the Stars Tour: Norwich	Norwich, CT	1	7		
15	InZanely Rude (Zane Bernardo and RJ Rude)	August 24, 2019	Heat Wave	Bethany, CT	1	693		
16	Club Cam (Antonio Zambrano and Cam Zagami)	July 17, 2021	Heat Wave	Waterbury, CT	1	217		
17	Waves and Curls (Traevon Jordan and Jaylen Brandyn)	February 19, 2022	The Future Is Now	Bethany, CT	1	1,721+	number = 18 champion = Swipe Right  reign = 1 date = May 10 2025 location = Westchester County Center White Plains NY  event = Northeast Wrestling WrestleFest XXVIII	

=== Combined reigns ===
†	Indicates the current champions
<1	The reign is shorter than one day.
¤	The exact length of the title is unknown

==== By team ====
Rank	Team	No. of reigns	Combined days
1	InZanely Rude (Zane Bernardo and RJ Rude)	1	693
2	So Over (Jimmy Preston and Mark Shurman)	1	281
3	Waves and Curls (Traevon Jordan and Jaylen Brandyn) †	1	1,721+
4	Club Cam (Antonio Zambrano and Cam Zagami)	1	217
5	The Royal Court (Anthony Battle, Bryan Anthony and Daniel Evans)	1	188
6	Cam Zagani and Robbie E	1	162
7	Adrenaline Rush (Daniel Evans and Keith Youngblood)	2	161
8	The Dredded Dead (Justin Dredd and Ron Zombie)	1	160
9	Jerry Lawler and Keith Youngblood	1	113
10	NOW (Hale Collins and Vik Dalishus)	1	113
11	The Kingdom (T. K. O'Ryan and Vinny Marseglia)	1	76
12	The Battle Brothers (Anthony Battle and Chris Battle)	2	68¤
13	Frankie Arion and Vinny Marseglia	1	35
14	The Royal Court (Brian Anthony and Daniel Evans)	1	7
15	Team Friendship (Mark Shurman and Scotty Slade)	1	N/A¤

==== By wrestler ====
Rank	Wrestler	No. of reigns	Combined days
1	Zane Bernardo	1	693
1	RJ Rude	1	693
3	Cam Zagani	2	379
4	Daniel Evans	4	356
5	Mark Shurman	2	281¤
6	Jimmy Preston	1	281
7	Jaylen Brandyn †	1	1,721+
7	Traevon Jordan†	1	1,721+
9	Keith Youngblood	3	274
10	Anthony Battle	3	256¤
11	Antonio Zambrano	1	217
12	Bryan Anthony	2	195
13	Robbie E	1	162
14	Justin Dredd	1	160
14	Ron Zombie	1	160
16	Jerry Lawler	1	113
16	Hale Collins	1	113
16	Vik Dalishus	1	113
19	Vinny Marseglia	2	111
20	T. K. O'Ryan	1	76
21	Chris Battle	2	68¤
22	Frankie Arion	1	35
23	Scotty Slade	1	N/A¤

== NEW Live Championship ==
NEW Live Championship

Details
- Promotion: Northeast Wrestling
- Date established: December 21, 2019
- Current champion: Victorious BRG
- Date won: August 13, 2022
Statistics
- First champion: Christian Casanova
- Longest reign: Christian Casanova (430 days)
- Shortest reign: Hale Collins (91 days)
- Heaviest champion: Brad Hollister (222 lb (101 kg))
- Lightest champion: Christian Casanova (176 lb (80 kg))

=== Reigns ===
Key
No.	Overall reign number
Reign	Reign number for the specific champion
Days	Number of days held
+	Current reign is changing daily

No.	Champion	Championship change			Reign statistics		Notes	Ref.
No.	Champion	Date	Event	Location	Reign	Days	Notes	Ref.
1	Christian Casanova	December 21, 2019	Holiday Havoc	Bethany, CT	1	430	Defeated J. T. Dunn and Keith Youngblood in a triple threat match to become inaugural Champion.	
2	Brad Hollister	February 23, 2021	Studio Wars	Bethany, CT	1	123	This was a two out of three falls match.	
3	Keith Youngblood	June 26, 2021	Resurgence	Waterbury, CT	1	112		
4	Mike Verna	October 16, 2021	Destiny	Bethany, CT	1	98		
5	Hale Collins	January 22, 2022	Wrestlefest XXVI	Poughkeepsie, NY	1	91		
6	J. T. Dunn	April 23, 2022	Spring Slam	Danbury, CT	1	112	This was a five-way match, also involving Channing Thomas, Chris Battle and Wrecking Ball Legursky.	
7	KC Navarro	August 13, 2022	Destiny	Bethany, CT	1	1,546+		
