= NEW Heavyweight Championship =

Professional wrestling championship

Details
- Promotion: Northeast Wrestling (NEW)
- Date established: March 3, 1996
- Current champion: Matt Taven
- Date won: October 15, 2022

Other names
- NEW Heavyweight Championship (1996 - 1998, 2006 - present); NWA Northeast Heavyweight Championship (1998 - 2006)
Statistics
- First champion: Bam Bam Bigelow
- Most reigns: Brian Anthony (3 reigns)
- Longest reign: Brian Anthony (1st reign, 1,051 days)
- Shortest reign: Brian Anthony (2nd reign, <1 days)

The NEW Heavyweight Championship is a heavyweight championship owned and promoted by Northeast Wrestling (NEW). The inaugural champion was Bam Bam Bigelow. The current champion is Nightmare, who is in his second reign.

== Title history ==
As of September 15, 2025, there have been 24 reigns shared among 21 wrestlers with four vacancies. Bam Bam Bigelow was the inaugural champion. Brian Anthony holds four records: the most reigns (three), the longest single reign (1,051 days, during his first reign), the shortest reign (less than one day, during his third reign), and the longest combined reign (1,114 days).

Key
No.	Overall reign number
Reign	Reign number for the specific champion
Days	Number of days held
+	Current reign is changing daily

No.	Champion	Championship change			Reign statistics		Notes	Ref.
No.	Champion	Date	Event	Location	Reign	Days	Notes	Ref.
1	Bam Bam Bigelow	March 3, 1996	-	Wallkill, NY	1	942		
—	Vacated	October 1, 1998	-	-	—	—		
2	Sycho Sid	October 4, 1998	-	Terryville, CT	1	485		
—	Vacated	February 1, 2000	-	-	—	—		
3	Xavier	December 9, 2006	Holiday Havoc	Terryville, CT	1	497	Defeated AJ Styles and Jay Lethal in a three-way match to win the vacant title.	
4	Ron Zombie	April 19, 2008	Wrestlefest XII	Bristol, CT	1	143		
5	Jeff Starr	September 9, 2008	Moscow Mania	Moscow, PA	1	53		
—	Vacated	November 1, 2008	-	-	—	—		
6	Jason Blade	December 6, 2008	Holiday Havoc	Waterbury, CT	1	342	Defeated Prince Jalil Salaam to win vacant title.	
7	Paul London	November 13, 2009	Hart Attack	Waterbury, CT	1	127		
8	Matt Taven	March 20, 2010	Wrestlefest XIV	Poughkeepsie, NY	1	559	This was a five-way elimination match, which also involving Brian Anthony, Jason Blade and Mike Bennett.	
9	Brian Anthony	September 30, 2011	Brass City Brawl II	Waterbury, CT	1	1,051	This was a Steel Cage match.	
10	Matt Taven	August 16, 2014	Heat Wave	Bethany, CT	2	512		
—	Vacated	January 10, 2016	-	-	—	—		
11	Brian Anthony	January 30, 2016	Over The Top	Bethany, CT	2	<1	This was a 30 Man Royal Rumble match for the vacant title.	
12	Hanson	January 30, 2016	Over The Top	Bethany, CT	1	252		
13	Brian Anthony	October 8, 2016	Destiny	Bethany, CT	3	63	This was a triple threat match, which also involving T. K. O'Ryan.	
14	T. K. O'Ryan	December 10, 2016	The Best Around Is Coming To Town	Bethany, CT	1	83		
15	Mike Bennett	March 3, 2017	Wrestlefest XXI	Waterbury, CT	1	15		
16	Cody Rhodes	March 18, 2017	March Mayhem	Port Jervis, NY	1	258		
17	Flip Gordon	December 1, 2017	Holiday Havoc	Waterbury, CT	1	204	This was a three-way match, which also involving Brad Hollister.	
18	Wrecking Ball Legursky	June 23, 2018	Big Bethany Bash	Bethany, CT	1	28		
19	Jack Swagger	July 21, 2018	Wrestling Under The Stars Tour: Niles	Niles, OH	1	91		
20	Brad Hollister	October 20, 2018	Destiny	Bethany, CT	1	196		
21	J. T. Dunn	May 4, 2019	NEW	Bethany, CT	1	42		
22	Darby Allin	June 15, 2019	Six Flags Slam Fest	Jackson, NJ	1	224		
23	Dan Maff	January 25, 2020	Over The Top	Waterbury, CT	1	994		
24	Traevon Jordan	October 15, 2022	The Show With No Name	Bethany, CT	1	63	Vacated due to injury.	
24	Matt Taven	December 17, 2022	Holiday Havoc	Bethany, CT	3	1,003+	Defeated Flip Gordon and JT Dunn in the Tournament of Champions final.	

== Combined reigns ==
As of September 15, 2025.

†	Indicates the current champion

Rank	Wrestler	No. of reigns	Combined days
1	Matt Taven †	3	1,221
2	Brian Anthony	3	1,114
3	Danny Maff	1	994
4	Bam Bam Bigelow	1	945
5	Xavier	1	497
6	Sycho Sid	1	485
7	Jason Blade	1	342
8	Cody Rhodes	1	258
9	Hanson	1	252
10	Darby Allin	1	224
11	Brad Hollister	1	196
12	Flip Gordon	1	193
13	Ron Zombie	1	161
14	Paul London	1	127
15	Jack Swagger	1	91
16	T. K. O'Ryan	1	83
17	Traevon Jordan	1	63
18	Jeff Star	1	58
19	J. T. Dunn	1	42
20	Wrecking Ball Legursky	1	28
21	Mike Bennett	1	15
