= J. T. Dunn =

American professional wrestler (born 1989)

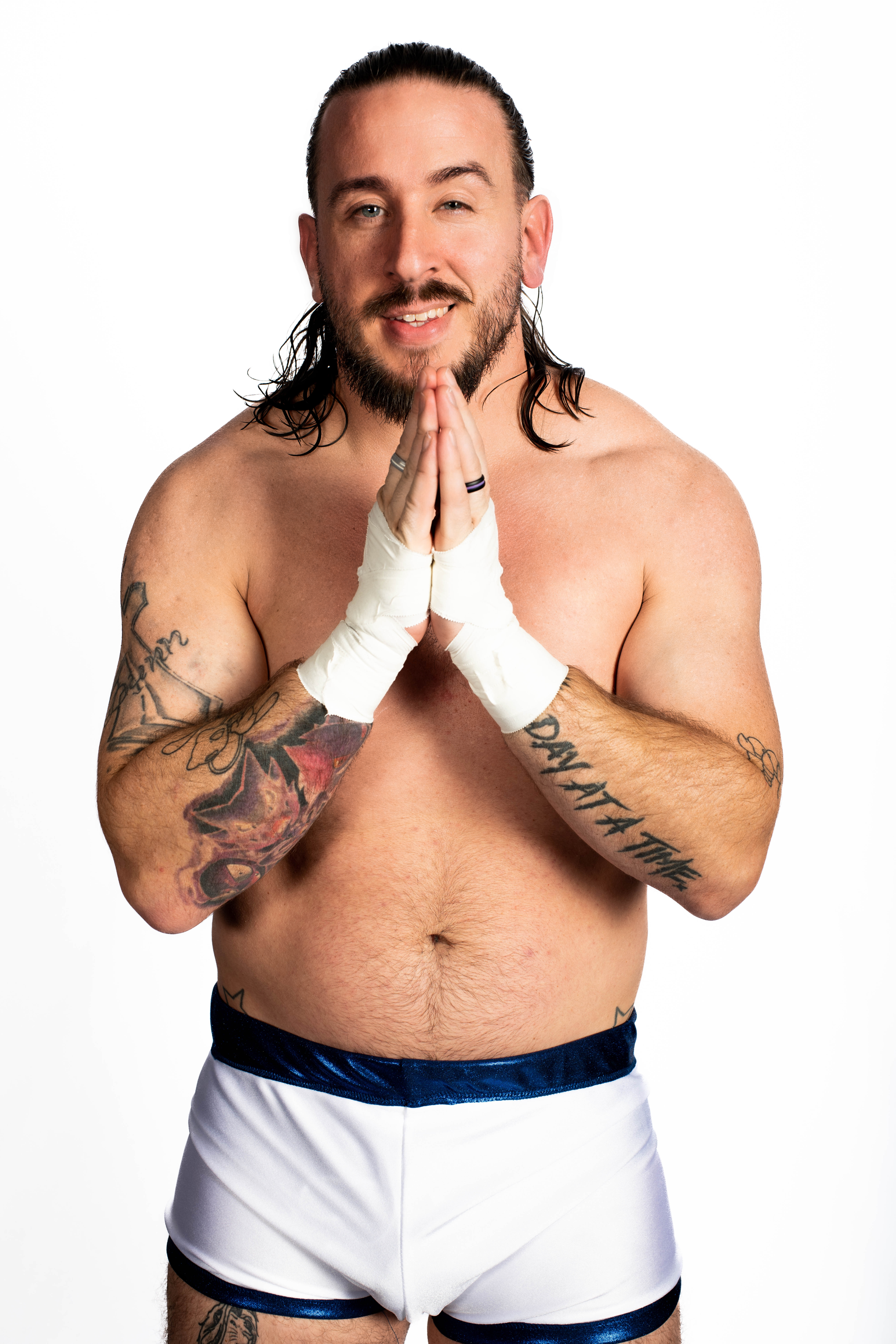
- Dunn in 2025

Personal information
- Born: Johnny Davis Jr. December 5, 1989 (age 36) Cranston, Rhode Island, U.S.

Professional wrestling career
- Ring name(s): J. T. Dunn; Johnny Davis Jr.
- Billed height: 5 ft 10 in (178 cm)
- Billed weight: 176 lb (80 kg)
- Billed from: Providence, Rhode Island
- Trained by: Dave Cole; Chris Hero
- Debut: December 2009

Johnny Davis Jr. (born December 5, 1989), better known by his ring name J. T. Dunn, is an American professional wrestler. He currently performs on the independent circuit and has worked extensively for American promotions such as AEW, Beyond, Chaotic, CZW, PWG, TNA, and WWE, and in Germany for wXw.

== Early life ==
Johnny Davis Jr. was born in Cranston, Rhode Island, on December 5, 1989.

== Professional wrestling career ==
=== Debut and Beyond (2009–present) ===
Davis adopted the ring name J. T. Dunn as a tribute to his late mother, whose maiden name was Dunn. After training under Dave Cole and Chris Hero, he debuted on the independent circuit in December 2009 and began working for Beyond Wrestling in June 2011, defeating Stan Stylez in his first match with the promotion. He then won a newcomer's 10-Person Gauntlet, defeating Joey Janela in the finals. The following day, he lost to Aaron Epic in a fatal four-way match, also featuring Dan Barry and Jarek 1:20. On July 23 at About Time, he lost to Leon St. Giovanni.

In November 2013, Dunn and David Starr took part in Beyond's Tournament for Tomorrow as The Juicy Product, defeating The Osirian Portal (Amasis and Ophidian) in the first round but losing to Team Tremendous (Dan Barry and Bill Carr) in the semi-finals. After The Juicy Product split in late 2014, Dunn began teaming with Hero in March 2015 as the tag team Death by Elbow. In their first match together, they defeated Starr and Eddie Kingston. At Beyond Scorned on April 25, Dunn defeated Starr in a singles match. On May 31 at The Real Thing, Death by Elbow defeated Team Tremendous, and defeated Da Hoodz (Davey Cash and Kris Pyro) in June. The following month at Beyond Americanrana, they defeated The Young Bucks. On December 27, Dunn once again lost to Hero in singles action.

On January 31, 2016, Dunn defeated Janela in a steel cage match, but lost to Janela in a dog collar match on February 28. On December 29, Dunn and Hero lost to The American Destroyers (Donovan Dijak and Mikey Webb) in their last match together.

=== TNA (2016) ===
Dunn made a one-off appearance for TNA in July 2016, losing to Braxton Sutter.

=== CZW (2013–2015) ===
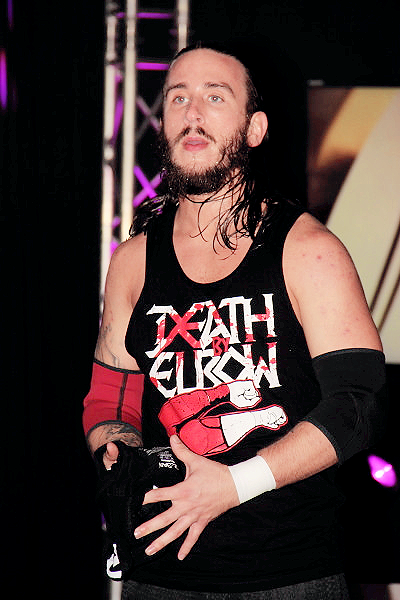
Dunn in 2017

Dunn debuted with CZW in 2013, and soon formed a tag team with David Starr known as The Juicy Product (combining Dunn's nickname of "The Juice" and Starr's nickname of "The Product"). In their first match as a tag team, Starr and Dunn lost to 4-Loco (Azrieal and Bandido Jr.) at Down With the Sickness. At Cerebral in October, they won their first match as a team, defeating Caleb Konley and Shane Hollister at Cerebral. On November 2 at Night of Infamy, Starr (along with Andrew Everett, Caleb Konley, and Latin Dragon) took part in a 5-Way Scramble match to determine the new No. 1 contender for the CZW Wired Television Championship, which was won by Shane Strickland. On December 14 at Cage of Death XV, Starr and Dunn unsuccessfully challenged Blk Out (Ruckus and Blk Jeez) for the CZW World Tag Team Championship.

On January 11, 2014, at Answering The Challenge, Starr and Dunn were defeated by OI4K (Jake and Dave Crist). At CZW's 15th Anniversary Show on February 8, The Juicy Product faced OI4K, The Nation Of Intoxication (Danny Havoc and Lucky 13) and The Front (Ace Delic and Sozio) in a 4-way match, won by The Front. At High Stakes 5, Dunn and Starr teamed up with Biff Busick and Alex Colon in a loss to OI4K, Azrieal and Chris Dickinson. On April 12 at Best of the Best XIII, Dunn and Starr became the new #1 contenders to the CZW Tag Team Championship, defeating OI4K. On April 27 at To Infinity, Starr and Dunn defeated The Beaver Boys (John Silver and Alex Reynolds) to become the new CZW World Tag Team Champions. They made their first successful defence at Proving Grounds on May 10, defeating Silver and Reynolds in a rematch. They once again successfully defended the championships on May 31, defeating Los Ben Dejos (Jay Cruz and Jay Rios)., and on June 14 at Tournament Of Death 13, they retained the championships once again, this time against Drew Gulak and Sozio. The Juicy Product made a surprise appearance for CZW's sister all-female promotion Women Superstars Uncensored (WSU) later that month, defeating Annie Social and Kimber Lee in 10 seconds to win the WSU Tag Team Championship.

Back in CZW, they again retained the CZW Tag Team Championship at New Heights on July 12 in a fatal four-way match, defeating The Beaver Boys, OI4K and Team Tremendous (Dan Barry and Bill Carr). On September 13 at WSU Resurgence, they successfully defended the WSU Tag Team Championships in a rematch against Lee and Social, and later that night retained the CZW Tag Team Championship against OI4K and The Beaver Boys in a 3-way ladder match at Down With The Sickness. On September 27 at Deja Vu, Starr and Dunn lost the CZW Tag Team Championships to OI4K. At WSU's 8th Anniversary Show on February 21, 2015, Dunn and Starr were defeated by Lee and Social for the WSU Tag Team Championship. On October 10, 2015 at Tangled Web 8, Dunn defeated former tag team partner David Starr. On October 14, 2017 at The Wolf Of Wrestling, Dunn (now being accompanied by Josh Briggs) returned to CZW and defeated Space Monkey, John Silver, and Trey Miguel in a fatal-four-way match. He then went on to defeat Ace Romero at Night Of Infamy after an assist from Briggs.

=== wXw (2016) ===
Dunn debuted for German promotion wXw in September 2016, losing to Walter. From September 30 to October 2, Dunn and Hero participated in the wXw World Tag Team League as Death by Elbow in the B Block. They won two of their matches, defeating Cerberus (Ilja Dragunov and Julian Nero). The LDRS of the New School (Zack Sabre Jr. and Marty Scurll), but losing to A4 (Absolute Andy and Marius Al-Awani). They finished the tournament with 2 wins and 4 points and did not advance to the final.

=== PWG (2016) ===
Dunn debuted in PWG as part of Death by Elbow at All Star Weekend 12 in a losing effort to the team of Ricochet and Matt Sydal. Later at Thirteen, the team unsuccessfully challenged The Young Bucks for the PWG World Tag Team Championship. Dunn returned to PWG in December, teaming with Hero and losing to reDRagon (Kyle O'Reilly and Bobby Fish).

== Personal life ==
In 2007, whilst Davis was training to become a wrestler, a fellow trainee botched a chokeslam on him; he was dropped on his head, causing his right knee to smash into his face. He has said that he has no recollection of who performed the move and did not actually feel any pain because his orbital bone broke away and pinched a nerve connected to his brain, causing temporary facial paralysis. He had facial reconstructive surgery and a metal plate inserted into the right side of his face.

Davis has said that he became addicted to drugs and alcohol during high school; in May 2012, when he was 22 years old, he woke up in his apartment with no recollection of how he got there after binging on drugs and alcohol that a wrestling promoter had given him as payment. He has been sober ever since.

== Championships and accomplishments ==
- Beyond Wrestling
  - Tournament For Tomorrow II (2013)
- Chaotic Wrestling
  - Chaotic Wrestling Heavyweight Championship (4 times)
  - Chaotic Wrestling Tag Team Championship (3 times) – with Davienne (1) and Ace Romero, Alisha, Danny Miles, Mike Verna and Trigga The OG (1), Danny Miles (2)
- Combat Zone Wrestling
  - CZW World Tag Team Championship (1 time) – with David Starr
- Wrestling Has A Tomorrow
  - WHAT! Championship (1 time, final)
- Dreamwave Wrestling
  - Dreamwave Alternative Championship (1 time)
- Full Impact Pro
  - FIP World Tag Team Championship (1 time) – with David Starr
- New England All Star Wrestling
  - NEASW Junior Heavyweight Championship (1 time)
- Five Borough Wrestling
  - FBW Heavyweight Championship (1 time)
- Limitless Wrestling
  - Vacationland Cup (2018, inaugural)
- New Age Old Tyme Wrestling
  - NAOTW Light Heavyweight Championship (1 time)
- New England Frontier Wrestling
  - NEFW United States Championship (1 time)
- New York Wrestling Connection
  - NYWC Tag Team Championship (1 time) – with David Starr
- Northeast Wrestling
  - NEW Heavyweight Championship (1 time)
  - NEW Live Championship (1 time)
  - King Of Bethany (2019)
- Fight Life Pro Wrestling
  - FL World Championship (1 time, current)
- Northeast Championship Wrestling
  - NCW Heavyweight Championship (2 times)
  - NCW New England Championship (1 time)
  - Total Elimination Tournament (2012)
- Power League Wrestling
  - PLW World Championship (1 time)
- Premier Wrestling Federation Northeast
  - PWF Northeast Lightning Cup Championship (1 time)
- Pro Wrestling Illustrated
  - PWI ranked him No. 218 of the top 500 singles wrestlers in the PWI 500 in 2018
- Pro Wrestling Magic
  - PWM Championship (1 time)
- Whaling City Wrestling
  - WCW Commonwealth Championship (1 time)
- Revival Pro Wrestling
  - RPW United States Championship (1 time)
- The Wrestling Revolver
  - Revolver World Championship (2 times)
- Renegerade Wrestling Alliance
  - RWA Triple Crown Championship (2 time)
- Women Superstars Uncensored
  - WSU Tag Team Championship (1 time) – with David Starr
- Xtreme Wrestling Alliance
  - XWA Heavyweight Championship (2 times)
  - XWA Tag Team Championship (1 time) – with Ace Romero
  - Xtreme Rumble Winner (2016)
