= Brand New =

Brand New may refer to:

== Music ==
- Brand New (band), an American alternative rock band

=== Albums ===
- Brand New by Xiumin, 2022
- Brand New (Ben Rector album) or the title song (see below), 2015
- Brand New (Kevin Simm album) or the title song, 2008
- Brand New (Salt-n-Pepa album) or the title song, 1997
- Brand New (Shinhwa album) or the title song, 2004
- Brand New (Gary Stewart album), 1988
- Brand New, by Leon Patillo, 1987
- Brand New, by the Stereo Bus, 1999

=== Songs ===
- "Brand New" (Ben Rector song), 2016
- "Brand New" (Rhymefest song), 2005
- "Brand New" (Sista song), 1994
- "Brand New" (Tyga, YG and Lil Wayne song), 2023
- "Brand New", by Aliyah's Interlude, 2025
- "Brand New", by Big Time Rush from Another Life, 2023
- "Brand New", by Craig David from The Time Is Now, 2018
- "Brand New", by Drake from "So Far Gone", 2009
- "Brand New", by Gucci Mane from The Appeal: Georgia's Most Wanted, 2010
- "Brand New", by Keyshia Cole from A Different Me, 2008
- "Brand New", by Shea Couleé, 2019
- "Brand New", by Trey Songz from Ready, 2009
- "Brand New", by You Me at Six from Night People, 2017
- "Brand New", written by Irving Berlin
- "Massara" (song) (translated to English as "Brand-new"), by Kana-Boon, 2019

== Other ==
- Brand-new, in marketing, new products or services created and promoted under a new brand
- MTV Brand New, three television channels in Europe

== See also ==
- Branding iron
- New (disambiguation)
- Firebrand (disambiguation)
