= T. K. O'Ryan =

American professional wrestler (born 1989)

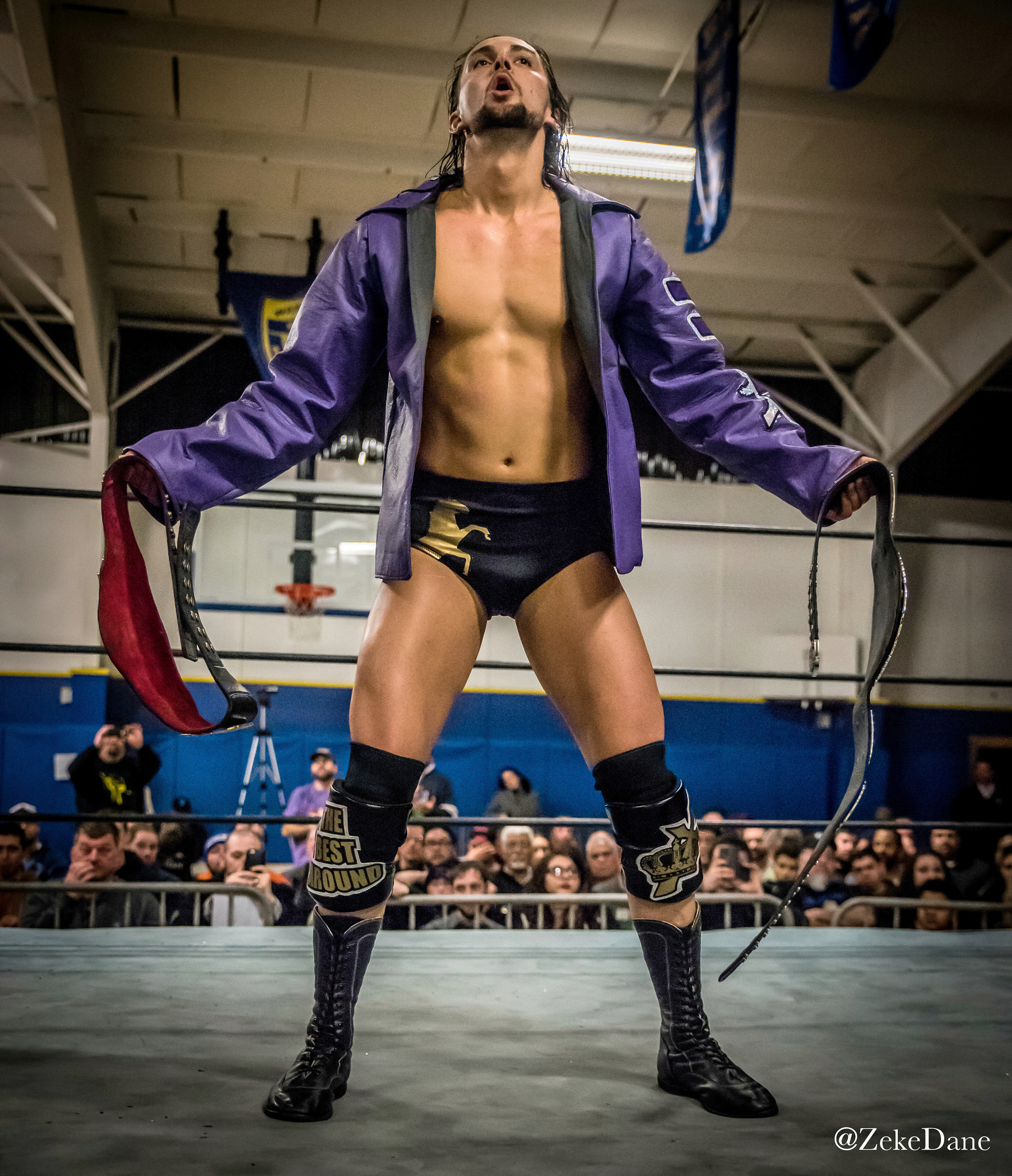
- O'Ryan holding both the NEW Tag Team Championship and ROH World Six-Man Tag Team Championship in 2017.

Personal information
- Born: Stephen John Tkowski; October 3, 1989 (age 37) Worcester, Massachusetts, U.S.

Professional wrestling career
- Ring name: T. K. O'Ryan
- Billed height: 6 ft 3 in (191 cm)
- Billed weight: 205 lb (93 kg)
- Billed from: Cape Cod, Massachusetts
- Trained by: "H2O" Ryan Waters; Nick Steel
- Debut: September 28, 2014
- Retired: December 5, 2019

Stephen John Tkowski (born October 3, 1989), better known by his ring name T. K. O'Ryan, is an American retired professional wrestler. He is best known for his time in Ring of Honor (ROH), where he was a three-time ROH World Six-Man Tag Team Champion as part of The Kingdom.

== Professional wrestling career ==
=== Training; early career (2014–2016) ===
O'Ryan began his training with "H_{2}O" Ryan Waters and Nick Steel at the Lock-Up Wrestling School of Professional Wrestling in Fall River, Massachusetts in June 2014. He debuted in Northeast Wrestling in Connecticut on April 18, 2015 in a match against Frankie Arion. Other early matches were wrestled for Xtreme Wrestling Alliance in West Warwick, Rhode Island and Pioneer Valley Pro Wrestling in Hadley, Massachusetts.

=== Ring of Honor (2016–2019) ===
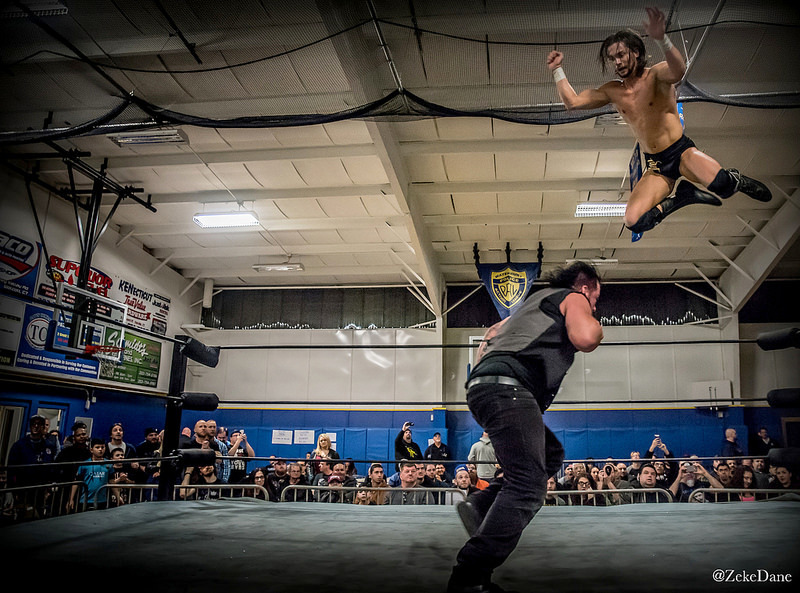
O'Ryan performing an aerial attack against Sami Callahan

O'Ryan made his Ring of Honor debut on October 1, 2016, in Lowell, MA as a part of The Kingdom (with Matt Taven and Vinny Marseglia). They defeated The Bullet Club (Adam Cole and The Young Bucks).

On December 2, 2016, The Kingdom became the first-ever ROH World Six-Man Tag Team Champions by defeating Kushida, Lio Rush, and Jay White.

O'Ryan was injured on March 10, 2017, during the ROH 15th Anniversary Show when he jumped too far on an Asai Moonsault and broke his leg on a guard rail. The following day, Silas Young replaced O'Ryan in a match, where The Kingdom lost the ROH World Six-Man Tag Team Championship to Bully Ray and The Briscoes.

On May 9, 2018, at ROH/NJPW War of the Worlds Tour, The Kingdom would regain the ROH World Six-Man Tag Team Championship by defeating SoCal Uncensored. On September 27, 2019, on Death Before Dishonor XVII, O'Ryan and Marseglia were attacked backstage. On ROH Television, O'Ryan announced The Kingdom was now disbanded after Marseglia's attack on Taven. He then announced he would be stepping away from the ring for time to take care of a leg injury and several concussions suffered throughout the year.

O'Ryan wrestled his final match in December 2019.

== Championships and accomplishments ==
- Canadian Wrestling's Elite
  - Elite 8 Tournament (2019)
- Northeast Wrestling
  - NEW Heavyweight Championship (1 time)
  - NEW Tag Team Championship (1 time) - with Vinny Marseglia
- Pioneer Valley Pro Wrestling
  - Pioneer Valley Pro Tag Team Championship (1 time) – with Hammer Tunis
- Pro Wrestling Illustrated
  - Ranked No. 148 of the top 500 singles wrestlers in the PWI 500 in 2019
- Ring of Honor
  - ROH World Six-Man Tag Team Championship (3 times, inaugural) – with Matt Taven and Vinny Marseglia
  - ROH World Six-Man Tag Team Championship Tournament (2016) – with Matt Taven and Vinny Marseglia
- Top Rope Promotions
  - TRP Tag Team Championship (1 time) – with Brad Hollister
- Xtreme Wrestling Alliance
  - XWA Heavyweight Championship (1 time)
