= ROH World Six-Man Tag Team Championship =

Men's professional wrestling championship

- Current design of the belts (2024–present)

Details
- Promotion: Ring of Honor
- Date established: December 2, 2016
- Current champions: The Lethal Twist (Jay Lethal, Blake Christian, and Lee Johnson)
- Date won: August 21, 2026

Other names
- ROH World Six-Man Tag Team Championship (2016–present); Unified World Trios Championship (Note: In tandem with the AEW World Trios Championship.) (2024)
Statistics
- First champions: The Kingdom (Matt Taven, T. K. O'Ryan, and Vinny Marseglia)
- Most reigns: As Tag Team (3 reigns): The Kingdom; As Individual (4 reigns): Vinny Marseglia
- Longest reign: Mexa Squad (Bandido, Flamita, and Rey Horus) (405 days)
- Shortest reign: Dalton Castle, Boy 1, and Boy 2 (58 days)
- Oldest champion: Dustin Rhodes (55 years, 107 days)
- Youngest champion: Bandido (24 years, 269 days)
- Heaviest champion: Shane Taylor (315 lb (143 kg))
- Lightest champion: Flamita (161 lb (73 kg))

The ROH World Six-Man Tag Team Championship is a professional wrestling world tag team championship created and promoted by the American promotion Ring of Honor (ROH). It is a specialized tag team championship, contested by three-man tag teams, also referred to as trios. In addition to being in ROH, the championship is also occasionally defended on All Elite Wrestling's (AEW) programs, as AEW and ROH are both owned by Tony Khan. The current champions are The Lethal Twist (Jay Lethal, Blake Christian, and Lee Johnson), who are in their first reign as a team and individually. They won the title by defeating Dalton Castle and The Outrunners (Turbo Floyd and Truth Magnum) at Death Before Dishonor on August 21, 2026.

Established on December 2, 2016, the inaugural champions were The Kingdom (Matt Taven, T. K. O'Ryan, and Vinny Marseglia). From April until July 2024, the ROH World Six-Man Tag Team Championship was held and defended together with the AEW World Trios Championship as the Unified World Trios Championship.

== History ==
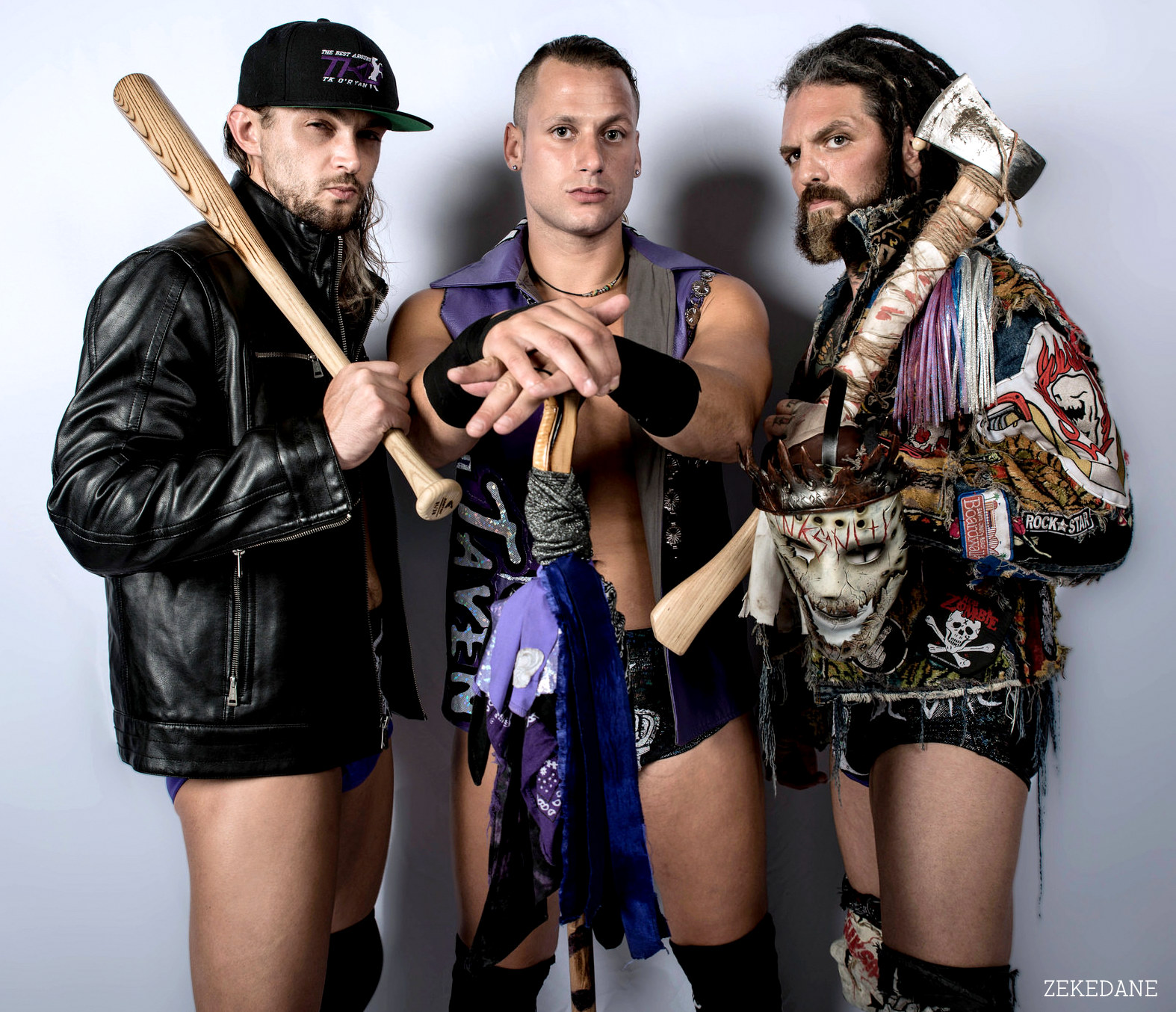
Inaugural champions The Kingdom (T. K. O'Ryan (left), Matt Taven (middle), and Vinny Marseglia (right)), who also hold the record for most reigns as a team at three while Vinny has the most reigns as an individual at four (by the time of his fourth reign, his ring name had changed to Vincent)

The ROH World Six-Man Tag Team Championship was officially announced in a press release on August 30, 2016, and marked the first new title created by ROH in six years following the 2010 creation of the ROH World Television Championship. ROH promoted the title as the first time in nearly 25 years that a major American promotion had a six-man tag team championship.

The tournament to crown the inaugural ROH World Six-Man Tag Team Champions took place between September 30 and December 2, 2016. The tournament featured participants from the Mexican Consejo Mundial de Lucha Libre (CMLL) and Japanese New Japan Pro-Wrestling (NJPW) promotions, both of which ROH had partnerships with. ROH noted how six-man tag team matches were a staple of Mexican lucha libre and how NJPW had recently created its own six-man tag team championship, the NEVER Openweight 6-Man Tag Team Championship. Lio Rush was originally announced for the tournament, but ended up being replaced by NJPW wrestler Kushida. However, Rush eventually returned to the team, replacing A.C.H. in the final due to his departure from ROH. The tournament started on September 30 at the All Star Extravaganza VIII pay-per-view (PPV), with the remaining first round and semifinal matches taking place at the October 1 and 29 tapings of the weekly Ring of Honor Wrestling program. The final of the tournament took place at Final Battle, with The Kingdom (Matt Taven, T. K. O'Ryan, and Vinny Marseglia) crowned as the inaugural champions.

During year 2017 the title was defended and changed hands in the United Kingdom at War of the Worlds UK. Also during year 2018 the championship was defended in the United Kingdom at ROH Honor United.

At All Elite Wrestling's (AEW) Dynasty: Zero Hour on April 21, 2024, ROH World Six-Man Tag Team Champions Bullet Club Gold (Jay White, Austin Gunn, and Colten Gunn) defeated AEW World Trios Champions The Acclaimed (Anthony Bowens, Max Caster, and Billy Gunn) in a winner takes all championship unification match to unify the titles as the Unified World Trios Championship. When Bullet Club Gold (who since became known as the Bang Bang Gang) were stripped of the Unified Trios Titles on July 10, 2024 (aired July 13), the AEW and ROH titles were separated, thus ending the unification.

== Inaugural championship tournament (2016) ==
=== Tournament bracket ===
First round All Star Extravaganza VIII; September 30, 2016; ROH Wrestling tapings
A. C. H., Jay White and Kushida	Pin
The Briscoes (Jay Briscoe and Mark Briscoe) and Toru Yano	14:00
The Cabinet (Caprice Coleman, Kenny King and Rhett Titus)	Pin
Jason Kincaid, Leon St. Giovanni and Shaheem Ali	9:31
Bullet Club (Adam Cole, Matt Jackson and Nick Jackson)	Pin
The Kingdom (Matt Taven, T. K. O'Ryan and Vinny Marseglia)	12:02
The Addiction (Christopher Daniels and Frankie Kazarian) and Kamaitachi	Pin
Team CMLL (Hechicero, Okumura and Último Guerrero)	11:12

Semifinals; ROH Wrestling tapings
A. C. H., Jay White and Kushida	Pin
The Cabinet (Caprice Coleman, Kenny King and Rhett Titus)	11:42
The Kingdom (Matt Taven, T. K. O'Ryan and Vinny Marseglia)	Pin
Team CMLL (Hechicero, Okumura and Último Guerrero)	9:34

Final; Final Battle^{1} December 2, 2016
Lio Rush^{1} , Jay White and Kushida	Pin
The Kingdom (Matt Taven, T. K. O'Ryan and Vinny Marseglia)	17:00

1 Lio Rush replaced A. C. H. in the tournament due to A.C.H. departing and being Released from ROH fulfilling his dreams and separate goals by seemingly taking independent bookings, indicating his departure from ROH.

== Belt designs ==
The 2018–2024 design of the title.

The original design of the ROH World Six-Man Tag Team Championship, making its debut in 2016, was similar to the WCW World Six-Man Tag Team Championship, but with different wording on both the center and side plates, different coloring, and slightly different shaping of the title; similar in visual style to the original ROH World Television Championship design, from 2010 to 2012, and 2012 to 2017, respectively, although separating the belt from the other two designs, the Six-Man title plates were slightly wider, with two squares on the sides plate of the center piece.

The championship belts were redesigned on New Year's day of 2018. In 2024, the championship belts were once again redesigned. The new design was debuted on AEW Dynamite by then champions, Bullet Club Gold (Jay White, Austin Gunn, and Colten Gunn). The championship belt has five plates, all in silver, on a black leather strap. The main plate is circular. The top of the plate features the current Ring of Honor logo. It has two black banners on the top and bottom. The top banner says "WORLD" with two stars on the left and right of the word, and the bottom banner say "CHAMPION" with one star on the left and right. The center of the plate features a black oval globe with red letters that says "6-MAN TAG TEAM" on it. It has two side plates on each side of the main plate. The inner side plates are rectangular and feature the current ROH logo at the top with a circle and a number 6 in red inside the circle. The outer side plates are also rectangular and again feature the current ROH logo but with a circle that says "WORLD 6-MAN TAG TEAM CHAMPIONS" inside the circle. It also features three red stars on the plate.

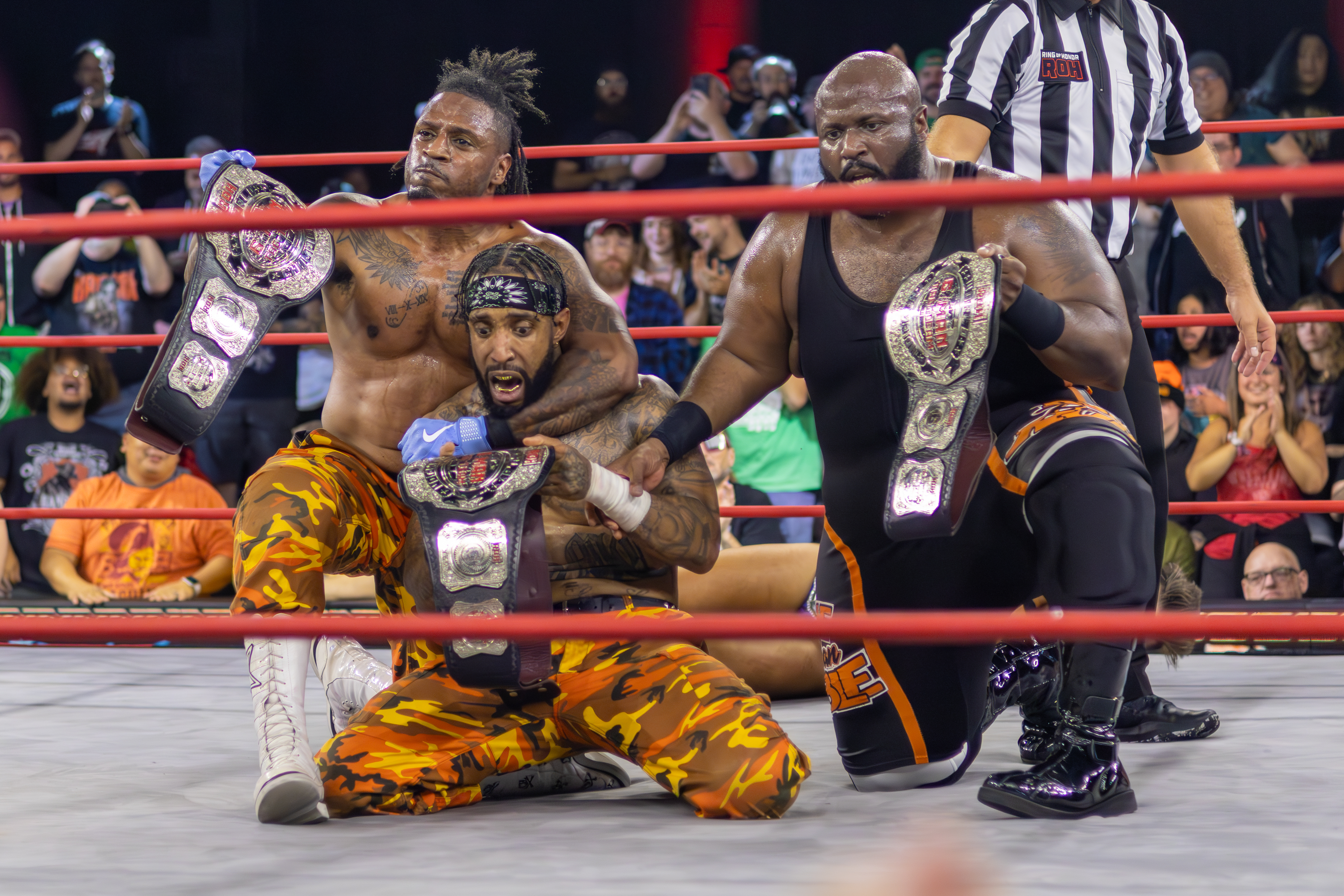
Shane Taylor Promotions (Capt. Shawn Dean, Carlie Bravo and Shane Taylor) with the third (2024–present) design of the championship shortly after winning the titles at Death Before Dishonor 2025.

During AEW's Dynasty: Zero Hour in April 2024, ROH World Six-Man Tag Team Champions Bullet Club Gold defeated The Acclaimed to win the AEW World Trios Championship, holding and defending both titles under the Unified World Trios Championship banner, using the standard AEW Trios belts, the ROH World Six-Man belts, and The Acclaimed's custom "scissoring" belts to represent the collective accolade. This would continue until July 2024 when Bullet Club Gold (who had since become known as the Bang Bang Gang) were stripped of the Unified World Trios Championship. This subsequently ended the unification of the AEW and ROH titles with the custom "scissoring" belts also being dropped.

== Reigns ==
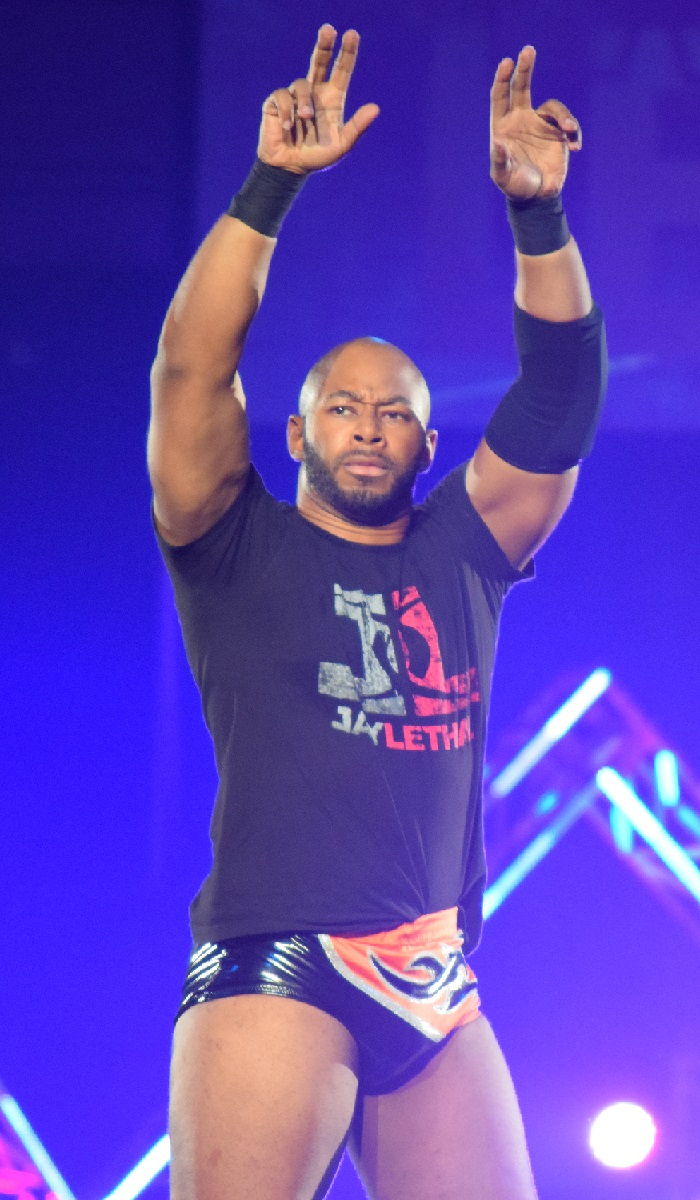
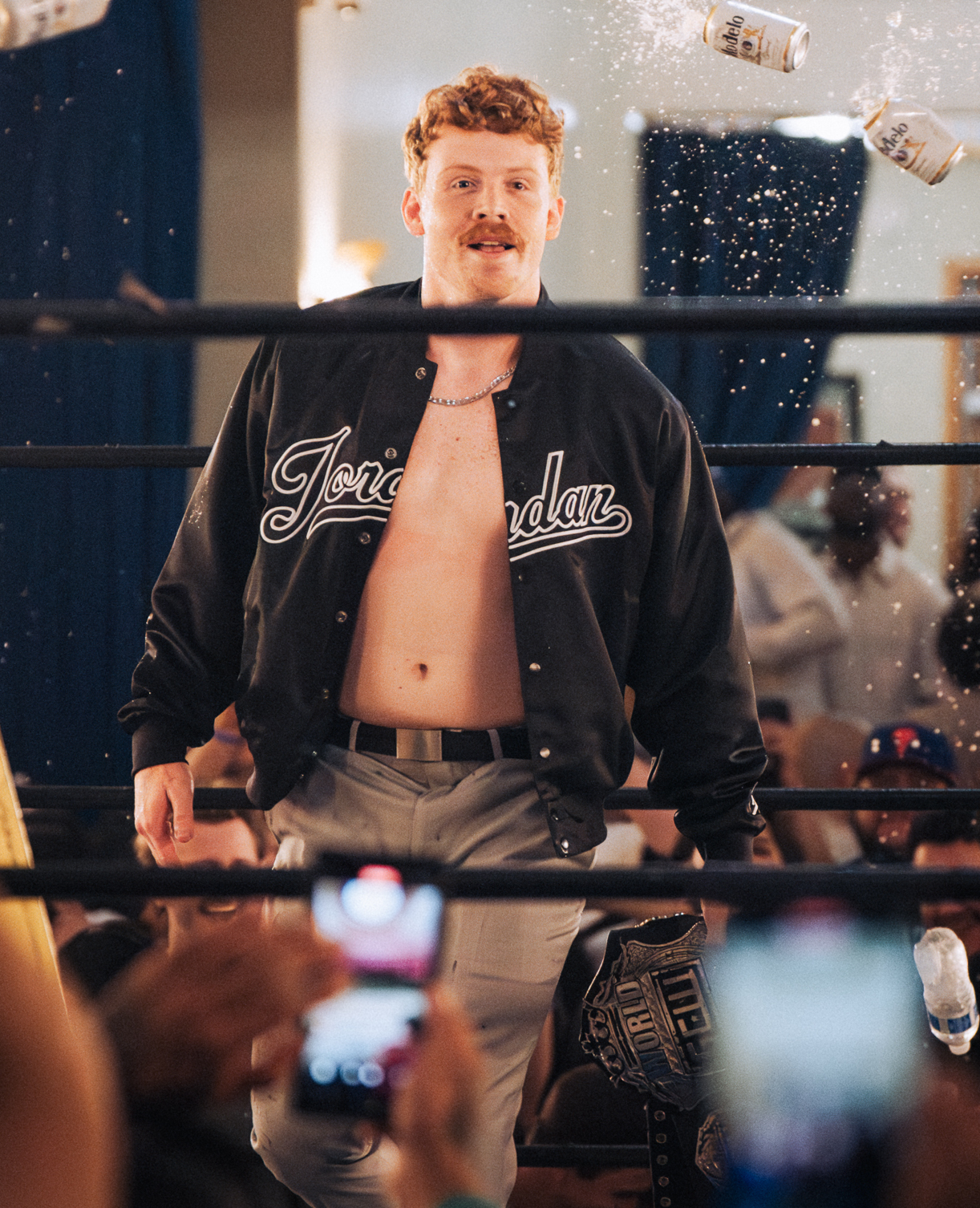
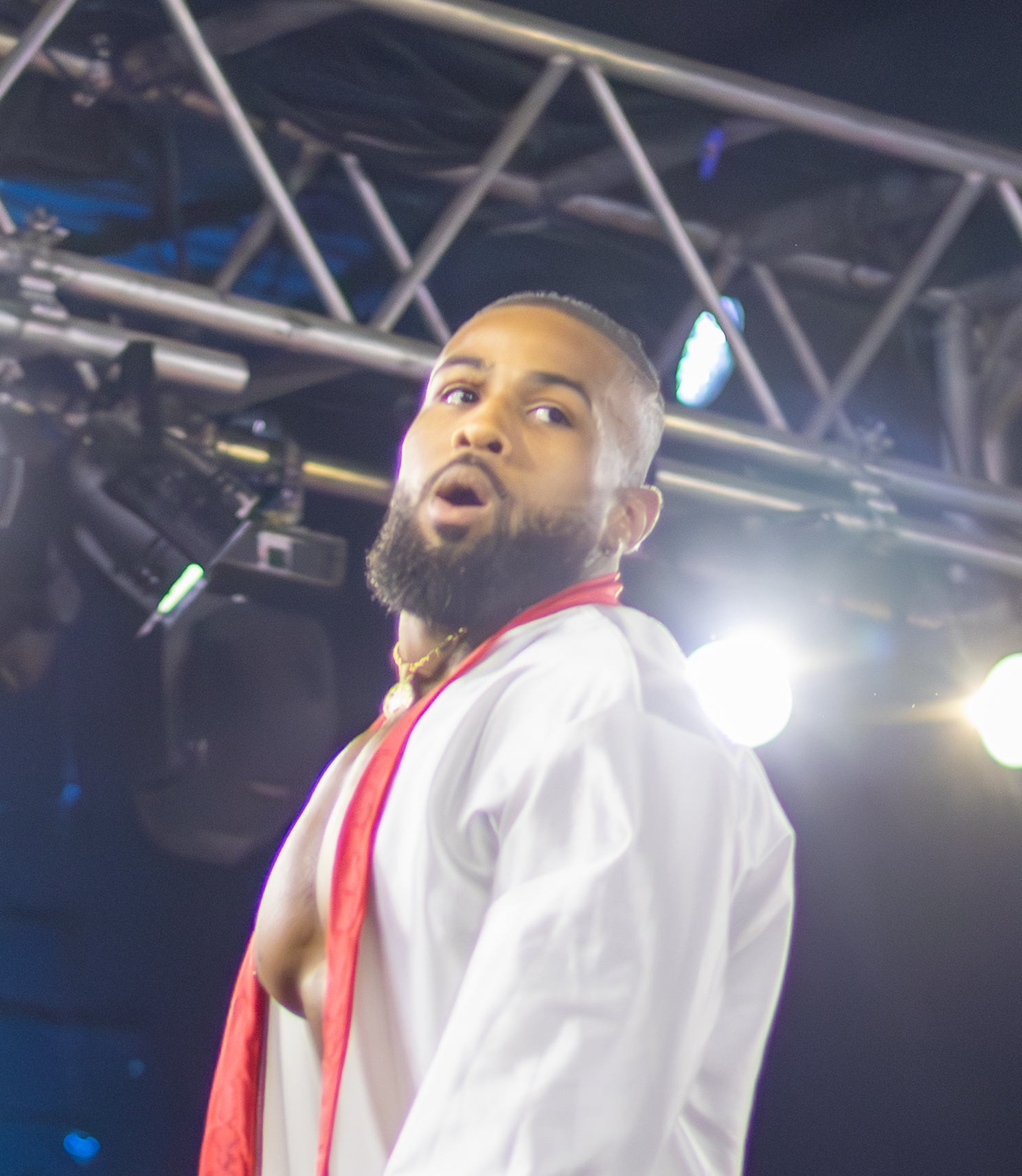
Current champions (from left to right) Jay Lethal, Blake Christian and Lee Johnson.

There have been 21 reigns between 16 teams composed of 42 individual wrestlers, and two vacancies. The Kingdom (Matt Taven, T. K. O'Ryan, and Vinny Marseglia) were the inaugural champions and they have the most reigns as a team at three, while individually, Vinny has the most reigns at four (by the time of his fourth reign, his ring name was changed to Vincent).

The current champions are The Lethal Twist (Jay Lethal, Blake Christian, and Lee Johnson), who are in their first reign as a team and individually. They won the title by defeating Dalton Castle and The Outrunners (Turbo Floyd and Truth Magnum) at Death Before Dishonor in Philadelphia, Pennsylvania, on August 21, 2026.
