= Vinny Marseglia =

American professional wrestler (born 1986)

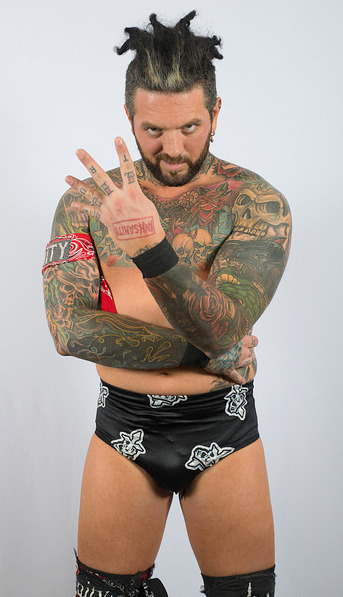
- Marseglia in 2017

Personal information
- Born: Vincent Marseglia; January 24, 1986 (age 40) Warwick, Rhode Island, U.S.

Professional wrestling career
- Ring name(s): Vinny Marseglia; Vincent
- Billed height: 6 ft 0 in (1.83 m)
- Billed weight: 189 lb (86 kg)
- Billed from: Warwick, Rhode Island
- Trained by: Mike Bennett; Ryan Waters; Spike Dudley
- Debut: 2006

Vincent Marseglia (born January 24, 1986) is an American professional wrestler. He is signed to Total Nonstop Action Wrestling (TNA), where he performs under the mononym Vincent and is a member of The Righteous alongside Dutch and Xia. He is best known for his work with All Elite Wrestling (AEW) and Ring of Honor (ROH), where he is a record setting four-time ROH World Six-Man Tag Team Champion.

== Professional wrestling career ==
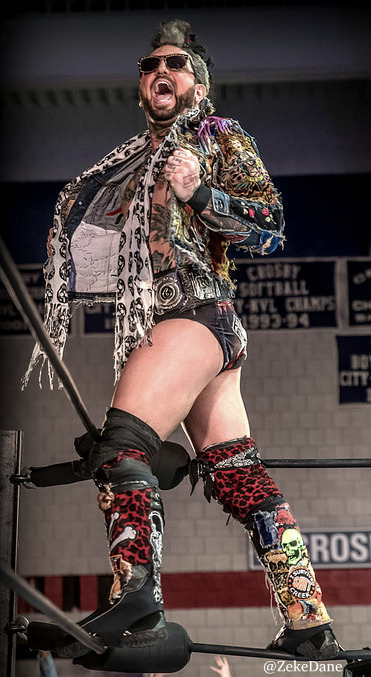
Marseglia in March 2017

=== Ring of Honor (2012–2022) ===
==== Early appearances (2012–2016) ====
Marseglia made his Ring of Honor (ROH) Television debut on April 7, 2012, in Baltimore, Maryland losing to Rhyno in a squash match. On April 30, 2016, Marseglia unsuccessfully challenged Jay Lethal for the ROH World Championship in West Warwick, Rhode Island.

==== The Kingdom (2016–2019) ====
Marseglia made his comeback on October 1, 2016, in Lowell, Massachusetts as a part of the revamped Kingdom stable alongside Matt Taven and T. K. O'Ryan. In their debut as a trio, they defeated The Bullet Club (Adam Cole and The Young Bucks). On the November 19 episode of ROH TV The Kingdom defeated Team CMLL (Hechicero, Okumura and Ultimo Guerrero) in the semi-finals to advance to the finals at the Final Battle 2016 PPV.

On December 2, 2016, The Kingdom became the first-ever ROH World Six-Man Tag Team Champions by defeating Kushida, Lio Rush & Jay White. They lost the title to Bully Ray and The Briscoes on March 11, 2017, in a match, where Silas Young replaced an injured T. K. O'Ryan.

On May 9, 2018, at ROH/NJPW War of the Worlds Tour, The Kingdom would regain the ROH World Six-Man Tag Team Championship by defeating SoCal Uncensored. On March 16, 2019, at Survival of the Fittest, They were defeated by Villain Enterprises for the Six-Man Tag Team Championship. On ROH Television, Marseglia attacked Taven in the ring and On December 13, 2019, at Final Battle Marseglia defeated Taven.

=== Impact Wrestling (2022) ===
At Hard To Kill Vincent made his Impact Wrestling debut after a 10-man Hardcore War tag team match attacking Rich Swann, Eddie Edwards, Heath and Rhino alongside former Kingdom stablemate Matt Taven, Mike Bennett, Maria Kanellis, and PCO. At Multiverse of Matches, Vincent competed in an Ultimate X match for the Impact X Division Championship which was won by Trey Miguel. At Under Siege, Honor No More (Vincent, Eddie Edwards, Kenny King, Matt Taven and Mike Bennett) defeated Bullet Club (Jay White, Chris Bey, Doc Gallows, El Phantasmo, and Karl Anderson) in a ten man tag team match. At Slammiversary, Honor No More lost to The Impact Originals (Alex Shelley, Chris Sabin, Davey Richards, Frankie Kazarian, and Nick Aldis). At Emergence, Honor No More defeated Bullet Club (Ace Austin, Chris Bey, Doc Gallows, Karl Anderson, and Hikuleo). At Victory Road, Vincent and PCO lost to The Motor City Machine Guns.

On October 8, 2022, it was announced that Bennett, Kanellis, Taven and Vincent had left Impact Wrestling.

=== All Elite Wrestling / Return to ROH (2023–2025) ===
On March 31, 2023, at Supercard of Honor, Vincent and Dutch returned to ROH (now owned by Tony Khan, who acquired ROH in 2022), confronting Evil Uno and Stu Grayson to close out Zero Hour. Beginning in late summer 2023, The Righteous began appearing in AEW. They would earn a shot at the ROH World Tag Team Championship, held by MJF and Adam Cole. At AEW's inaugural WrestleDream event on October 1, Vincent and Dutch were unsuccessful in their bid to win the ROH Tag Team Championship, despite the match being changed to a 2-on-1 after Adam Cole suffered a legitimate ankle injury the week prior. In May 2025, Vincent and Dutch left AEW/ROH.

=== Return to Total Nonstop Action Wrestling (2025–present) ===
Vincent (alongside his partner Dutch) made their return to Impact Wrestling, now known as Total Nonstop Action Wrestling (TNA), on December 5, 2025, at Final Resolution, confronting The Hardys

== Championships and accomplishments ==
- Canadian Wrestling's Elite
  - CWE Championship (1 time)
- Chaotic Wrestling
  - Chaotic Wrestling Tag Team Championship (1 time) - with Matt Taven
- Liberty States Pro Wrestling
  - Liberty States Heavyweight Championship (1 time)
- Northeast Wrestling
  - NEW Tag Team Championship (2 times) - with Frankie Arion (1) and T. K. O'Ryan (1)
- Premier Wrestling Federation Northeast
  - PWF Northeast Lightning Cup Championship (1 time)
- Pro Wrestling Illustrated
  - Ranked No. 145 of the top 500 singles wrestlers in the PWI 500 in 2019
- Ring of Honor
  - ROH World Six-Man Tag Team Championship (4 times, inaugural) – with Matt Taven and T. K. O'Ryan (3) and Bateman and Dutch (1)
  - ROH World Six-Man Tag Team Championship Tournament (2016) – with Matt Taven and T. K. O'Ryan
- Top Rope Promotions
  - TRP Heavyweight Championship (1 time)
  - TRP Interstate Championship (1 time)
  - Killer Kowalski Cup Tournament (2012, 2015)
- Xtreme Wrestling Alliance
  - XWA Firebrand Championship (1 time)
