= The Kingdom (professional wrestling) =

Professional wrestling tag team

- Matt Taven (left) and Mike Bennett (right) at Death Before Dishonor 2026

Tag team
- Members: Matt Taven/Matthew Taven; Mike Bennett/Michael Bennett
- Names: The Kingdom; The Undisputed Kingdom
- Former members: Matt Hardy; T. K. O'Ryan; Vinny Marseglia; Maria Kanellis-Bennett; Wardlow; Adam Cole; Roderick Strong; Kyle O'Reilly
- Debut: July 12, 2014
- Years active: 2014–2015; 2016–2019; 2022–2026; 2026–present

The Kingdom is professional wrestling tag team consisting of Matthew Taven and Michael Bennett. They are signed to Ring of Honor (ROH).

The stable rose to prominence during the mid-2010s in Ring of Honor (ROH) and also made appearances in Impact Wrestling and New Japan Pro-Wrestling (NJPW). Some major championships held by the stable include the ROH World Championship (two times), ROH World Six-Man Tag Team Championship (three times, inaugural), ROH World Tag Team Championship (three times), IWGP Tag Team Championship (one time), Impact World Tag Team Championship (one time), AEW International Championship (one time), and NWA World Historic Welterweight Championship (one time).

== History ==
=== Ring of Honor (2014–2019) ===
==== Formation as The Kingdom (2014–2015) ====
On July 12, 2014, The Kingdom officially made their debut as a stable in Ring of Honor when Matt Hardy, Bennett, and Cole faced War Machine (Hanson and Raymond Rowe) along with Michael Elgin in a six-man tag team match which ended in a no contest. On November 15, 2014, at Glory By Honor XIII, Matt Taven, who had joined the stable back in September, teamed with Bennett as they unsuccessfully challenged reDRagon (Bobby Fish and Kyle O'Reilly) for the ROH World Tag Team Championship. At Best in the World 2014 Cole lost the ROH World Championship to Michael Elgin. In July, Hardy opted out of his ROH contract and went back to TNA. After failing to regain the ROH World Championship from now champion Jay Briscoe at Final Battle 2014, Cole announced he had suffered a shoulder injury which would require surgery.

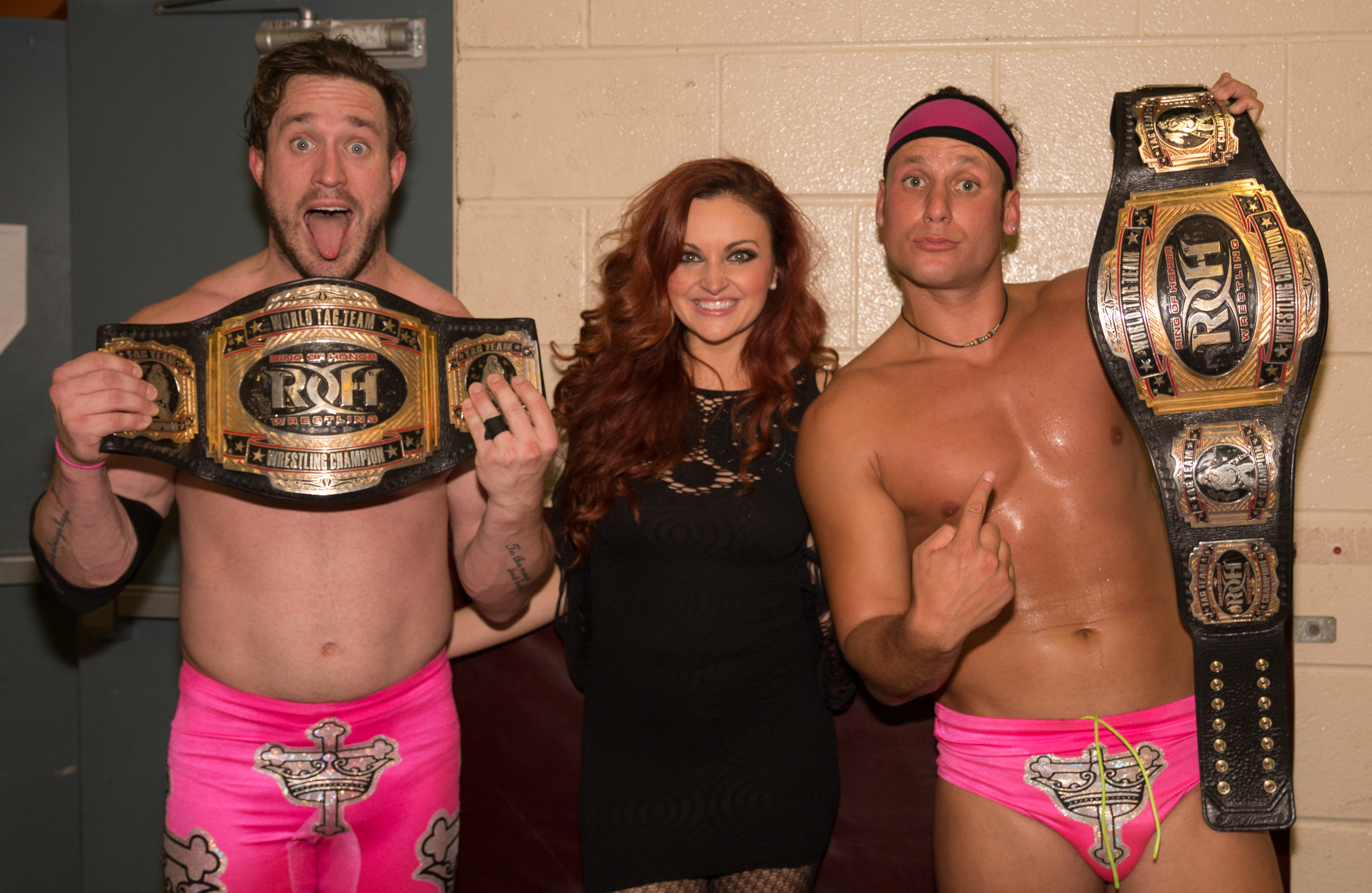
Mike Bennett (left) and Matt Taven (right) displaying their ROH World Tag Team Championship, along with Maria Kanellis-Bennett

On March 1, 2015, at the 13th Anniversary Show, Bennett and Taven defeated The Addiction (Christopher Daniels and Frankie Kazarian) as well as Karl Anderson (who competed on his own due to Doc Gallows suffering travel issues) in a three-way tag team match. On March 27, 2015, at Supercard of Honor IX, Bennett and Taven unsuccessfully challenged reDRagon (Bobby Fish and Kyle O'Reilly) for the ROH World Tag Team Championship. Cole returned from his injury at War of the Worlds ‘15, where he lost to A.J. Styles. Cole then began having tension with Bennett and Taven and even teased a reunion with former Future Shock partner Kyle O’Reilly. On September 18 at All Star Extravaganza VII, Bennett and Taven won their first-ever ROH World Tag Team Championship, when they defeated the then champions The Addiction (Frankie Kazarian and Christopher Daniels) and The Young Bucks (Matt Jackson and Nick Jackson). Later that night Cole betrayed O’Reilly during his world championship match against Jay Lethal remaining with The Kingdom and turning heel once again. Bennett and Taven lost the title to War Machine on December 18 at Final Battle. Bennett and Kanellis left ROH after the following day's Ring of Honor Wrestling taping, after failing to come to terms on a new contract with the promotion. With Taven suffering a legitimate knee injury and subsequently turning on Cole (who would later join the Bullet Club as its U.S. side's de facto leader), The Kingdom went on hiatus.

==== Matt Taven's leadership (2016–2019) ====
On the September 18, 2016 episode of Ring of Honor Wrestling, Taven returned and announced that The Kingdom would be competing in the tournament for the new ROH 6-Man Tag Team Championship, but wouldn't announce his partners. On a match taped on October 1, 2016, for the October 23rd, 2016 episode of Ring of Honor Wrestling, Matt Taven revealed T. K. O'Ryan and Vinny Marseglia as new members of The Kingdom and defeated Bullet Club (Adam Cole, Matt Jackson and Nick Jackson) to advance to the semi-finals of the ROH World Six-Man Tag Team Championship Tournament. On the November 19 episode of ROH TV The Kingdom defeated Team CMLL (Hechicero, Okumura and Ultimo Guerrero) to advance to the finals at the Final Battle 2016 PPV. On December 2, The Kingdom defeated Jay White, Kushida and Lio Rush in the finals to become the inaugural ROH World Six-Man Tag Team Champions.

On March 11, 2017, at Ring of Honor TV taping, Taven, Marseglia and Silas Young, who filled in for an injured T. K. O'Ryan, lost the ROH World Six-Man Tag Team Championship to Bully Ray and The Briscoes.

On May 10, 2017, during the second night of ROH/NJPW War Of The Worlds, Taven was unsuccessful at winning the ROH World Championship against Christopher Daniels.

At Final Battle 2017, Taven defeated Will Ospreay.

In January 2018, Taven started a rivalry with Cody Rhodes when he attacked him, it all lead and culminated at the ROH 16th Anniversary Show, where Taven was defeated by Cody.

On May 9, 2018, at ROH/NJPW War of the Worlds Tour, The Kingdom would regain the ROH World Six-Man Tag Team Championship by defeating SoCal Uncensored. During a match for the ROH World Championship, Taven achieved a three count in the match, however the referee was not looking and the match ended with Jay Lethal winning the title. The Kingdom would lose the titles to Bullet Club, later known as The Elite (Cody and the Young Bucks).

At Death Before Dishonor XVI, The Kingdom attacked Will Ospreay and Jay Lethal. After the assault, Taven pulled out of a bag a copy of the Ring Of Honor World Championship which was purple instead of black leather, saying he is the true Ring Of Honor World Champion.

On November 2, 2018, The Kingdom would win the ROH World Six-Man Tag Team Championship for the third time, beating The Elite, holding them until March 16, 2019

On March 15, 2019, at the ROH 17th Anniversary Show, Taven challenge Lethal for the Ring of Honor World Championship, with the match ending in a 60-minute time-limit draw.

The following month at G1 Supercard, Taven would defeat Lethal and Marty Scurll in a ladder match to win the ROH World Title, and with that becoming the second ROH Grand Slam winner. His title win over the more popular Marty Scurll has been criticized, usually calling him a "critical and financial flop". During a 411Mania podcast, Jerome Cusson said his title win "actively hurt ROH" since it was not "a draw" and he "wasn't over".

On September 27, 2019, at Death Before Dishonor, Matt Taven was defeated by Rush for the ROH Championship, ending his reign at 174 days. After the match, O'Ryan and Marseglia were shown having been attacked backstage (to explain why neither of them had interfered on Taven's behalf to prevent the defeat, which they regularly had done in the past).

On the ROH Death Before Dishonor Fallout TV episode, Marseglia attacked Taven in the ring, signalling the start of a storyline feud between the two former allies.

On December 13, 2019, at ROH's Final Battle PPV, Marseglia scored an upset victory over Taven. After the match, Marseglia and Bateman attacked Taven, attempting to break Taven's ankles. On the December 14, 2019 episode of Ring of Honor Wrestling, O'Ryan announced that The Kingdom had disbanded.

=== New Japan Pro-Wrestling (2014–2015) ===
On August 10, 2014, during the G1 Climax The Kingdom, represented by Cole and Bennett and accompanied by Maria Kanellis, made their New Japan Pro-Wrestling debuts, defeating Captain New Japan and Jushin Thunder Liger. The Kingdom, now represented by Bennett and Taven, returned to New Japan in November 2014, to take part in the 2014 World Tag League. They finished third in their block with a record of four wins and three losses. Bennett and Taven returned to NJPW on April 5, 2015, at Invasion Attack 2015, where they defeated Bullet Club (Doc Gallows and Karl Anderson) to win the IWGP Tag Team Championship. On July 5 at Dominion 7.5 in Osaka-jo Hall, The Kingdom lost the IWGP Tag Team Championship back to Bullet Club in their first defense. Bennett and Taven returned to NJPW in November to take part in the 2015 World Tag League, where they finished with a record of two wins and four losses, failing to advance from their block.

On October 27, 2021, Ring of Honor announced that it would go on a hiatus after Final Battle in December of that year. All personnel would be released from their contracts as part of plans to "reimagine" the company as a "fan-focused product".

=== All Elite Wrestling / Return to ROH (2022–present) ===
==== Debut and alliance with Roderick Strong (2022–2023) ====
The Kingdom made their All Elite Wrestling (AEW) debut on the October 14, 2022, episode of Rampage, interrupting FTR (Cash Wheeler and Dax Harwood) and Shawn Spears' victory celebration.

The Kingdom made their return return to Ring of Honor - now AEW's sister promotion - at Final Battle in December 2022, where he and Bennett lost to Top Flight. At Supercard of Honor in March 2023, The Kingdom completed in a "Reach for the Sky" ladder match for the vacant ROH World Tag Team Championship, which was won by the Lucha Brothers. In April 2023, The Kingdom began a feud with Darius Martin and Action Andretti. In the same month The Kingdom defeated the duo. On May 18, The Kingdom faced Andretti and Martin in a Fight without Honor rematch, where they were defeated, ending their feud.

Around this time, Roderick Strong aligned with them, while Maria quietly left the team and she later joined with Cole Karter and Griff Garrison as their manager.

==== Adam Cole's leadership and The Undisputed Kingdom (2023–2025) ====
Starting from the September 27, 2023, episode of Dynamite, AEW World and ROH World Tag Team Champion MJF was the target of a masked individual known as The Devil and his associates, The Devil's Masked Men. On the December 27 at Dynamite: New Year's Smash, The Devil's Masked Men won the ROH World Tag Team Championship by defeating MJF in a 2-on-1 handicap match. Three days later at Worlds End, MJF was once again attacked by The Devil's Masked Men following his AEW World Championship loss to Samoa Joe. Adam Cole, who was one half of Better Than You Bay Bay with MJF, had accompanied MJF to the ring for the match and was held back by The Devil's Masked Men whilst MJF shouted at them not to "fucking hit [Cole]". The lights went out and when they turned on it was revealed that The Devil had been Cole all along and he had reformed The Kingdom as its leader with Taven, Bennett (who together were revealed as the ROH World Tag Team Champions), Strong, and Wardlow. On the January 3, 2024, episode of Dynamite, Cole announced that the stable had changed its name to the "Undisputed Kingdom" (using a similar name to The Undisputed Era, Cole and Strong's previous faction from their time in WWE NXT).

On March 3, 2024, at Revolution, Wardlow defeated Chris Jericho, Powerhouse Hobbs, Lance Archer, Hook, Brian Cage, Magnus, and Dante Martin in an All-Star Scramble match where he will receive an AEW World Championship match. Later in the show, Strong defeated Orange Cassidy for the AEW International Championship. After the match, Strong, Taven and Bennett was confronted by a returning Kyle O'Reilly, who refused an offer to join the Undisputed Kingdom. On May 26, Strong lost the International Championship to Will Ospreay at Double or Nothing. On August 17 episode of Collision, Bennett and Taven lost their ROH World Tag Team Championships to Dustin Rhodes and Sammy Guevara. On the October 23 episode of Dynamite, the stable turned babyface and reignited their feud with MJF, who is now a heel. On December 28 at Worlds End, Kyle O'Reilly (another Undisputed Era member) joined the group after coming to the aid of Cole from an MJF attack. On April 6, 2025, at Dynasty, Cole defeated Daniel Garcia to win the AEW TNT Championship.

On the April 9 episode of Dynamite following Dynasty, Cole addressed winning the AEW TNT Championship in a backstage segment alongside Strong and O'Reilly and formed their own group known as "The Paragon", leaving the Undisputed Kingdom in the process.

==== Tag team return as The Kingdom (2025–present) ====
After a brief absence from television, Bennett and Taven made their return as "The Kingdom" on the April 24 episode of Ring of Honor Wrestling, teaming with Spanish Announce Project (Angélico and Serpentico) in a losing effort against The Premier Athletes (Ariya Daivari and Tony Nese) and The Righteous (Dutch and Vincent). In January 2026, it was reported that Taven's AEW contract had expired and was not renewed, ending his over three-year tenure with the promotion. At Supercard of Honor on May 15, Taven and Bennett made their ROH returns.

=== Return to NJPW (2024) ===
Bennett and Taven, as the Undisputed Kingdom, made their return to NJPW for the first time since 2015 on November 8, 2024, at Fighting Spirit Unleashed, where they were defeated by Shingo Takagi and Yota Tsuji.

== Members ==
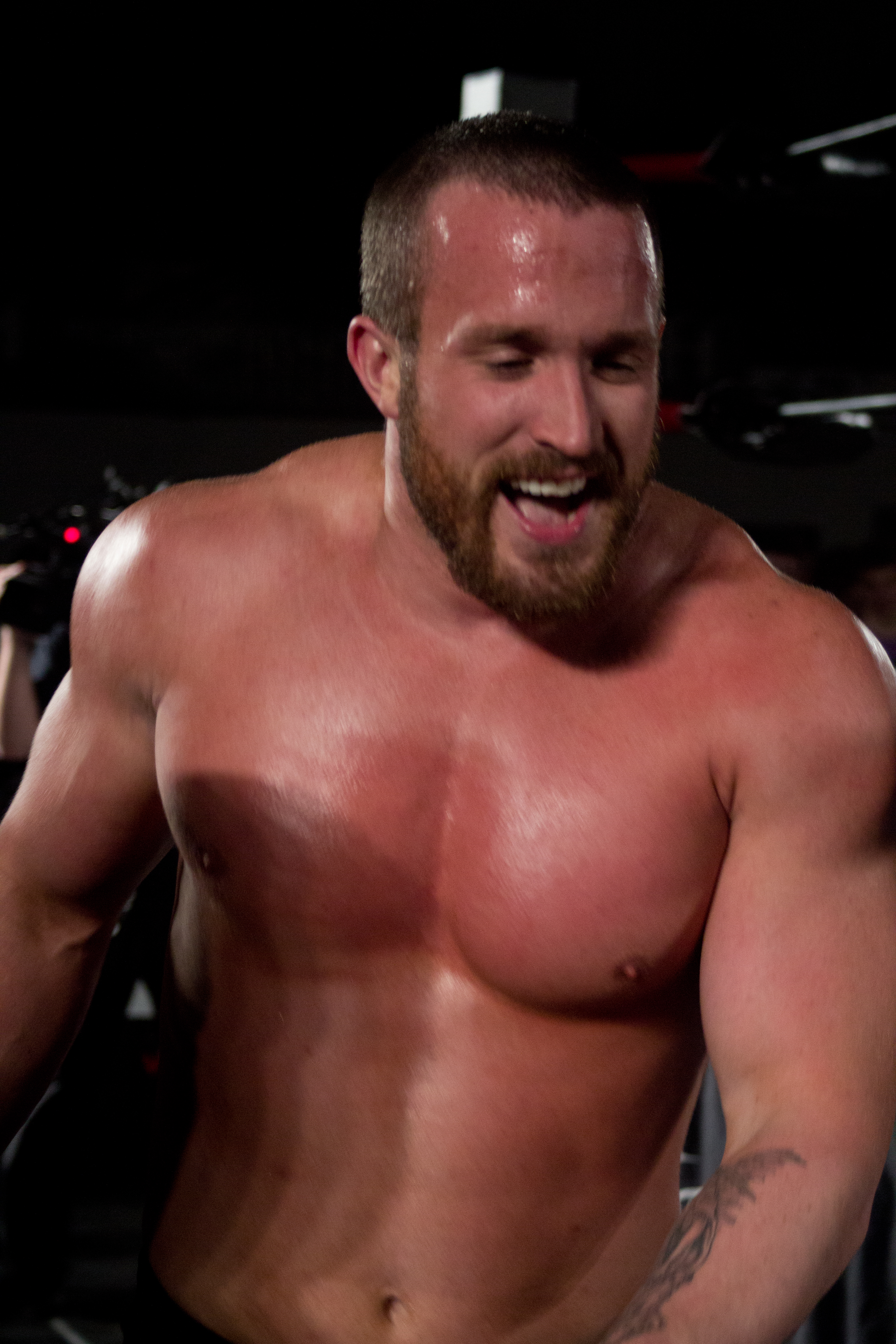
Mike Bennett

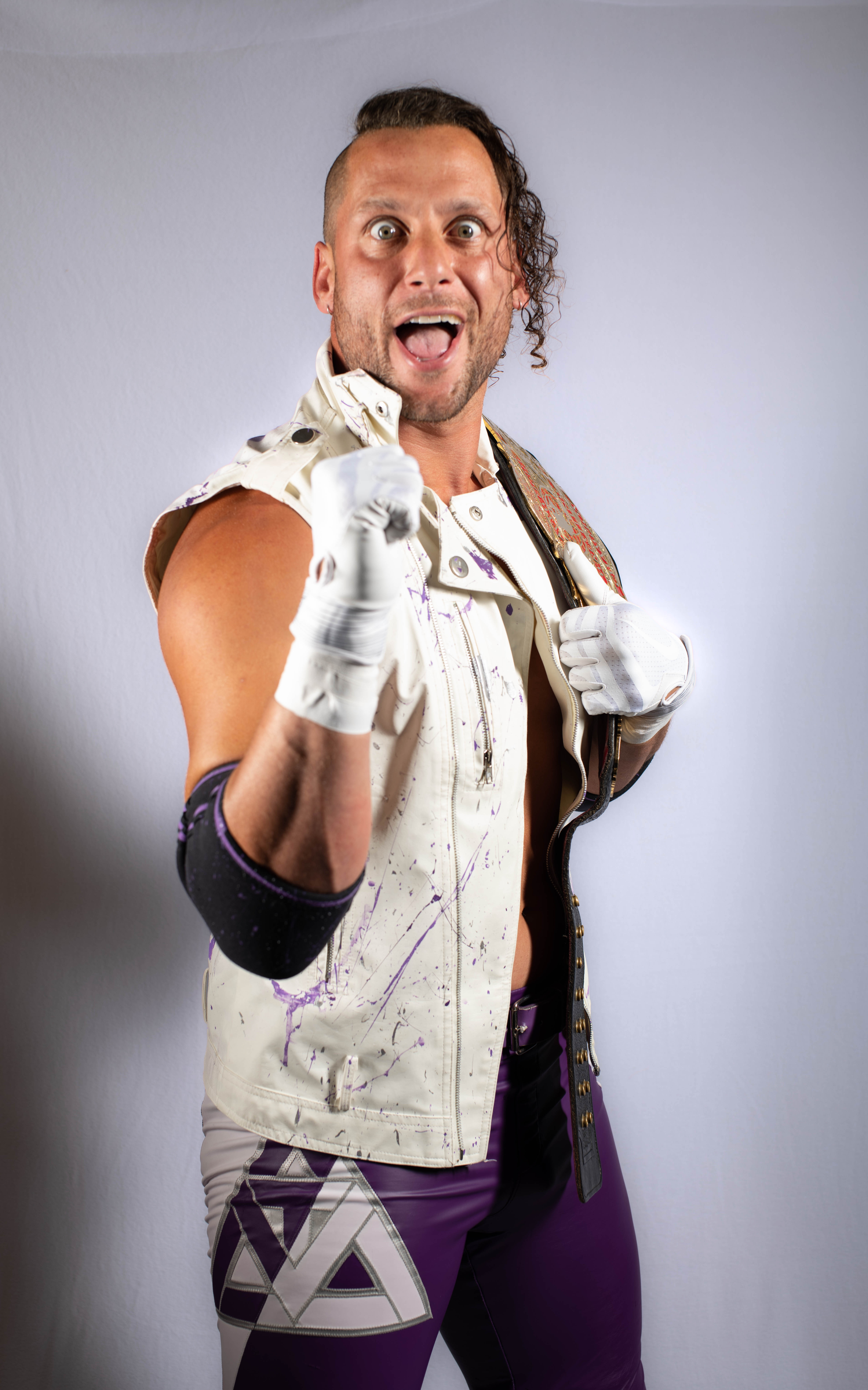
Matt Taven (I)

I-II	Leader(s)
*	Founding member(s)
M	Manager

=== Current ===
Members	Joined
Mike Bennett/Michael Bennett	July 12, 2014* – December 19, 2015; November 21, 2020
Mike Taven/Matthew Taven (I) (Note: Taven appointed himself as the leader of the revival version of the stable from 2016-19.)	September 27, 2014 – December 14, 2019; November 21, 2020

=== Former ===
Members	Joined	Left
Matt Hardy	July 12, 2014*	July 1, 2015
T.K. O'Ryan	October 1, 2016	December 14, 2019
Vinny Marseglia	October 1, 2016	September 28, 2019
Maria Kanellis-Bennett (M)	July 12, 2014*	December 19, 2015
Maria Kanellis-Bennett (M)	November 21, 2020	August 12, 2023
Wardlow (Note: Wardlow never officially left the group. April 21, 2024 marks his last appearance as a member.)	December 30, 2023	April 21, 2024
Adam Cole (II) (Note: Cole originally left the group on April 2016, but rejoined at Worlds End and officially became the second leader of the stable in the AEW version, renaming it as The Undisputed Kingdom, a tribute to his former stable The Undisputed Era.)	July 12, 2014*	April 16, 2016
Adam Cole (II)	December 30, 2023	April 9, 2025
Roderick Strong	December 30, 2023	April 9, 2025
Kyle O'Reilly	December 28, 2024	April 9, 2025

== Championships and accomplishments ==
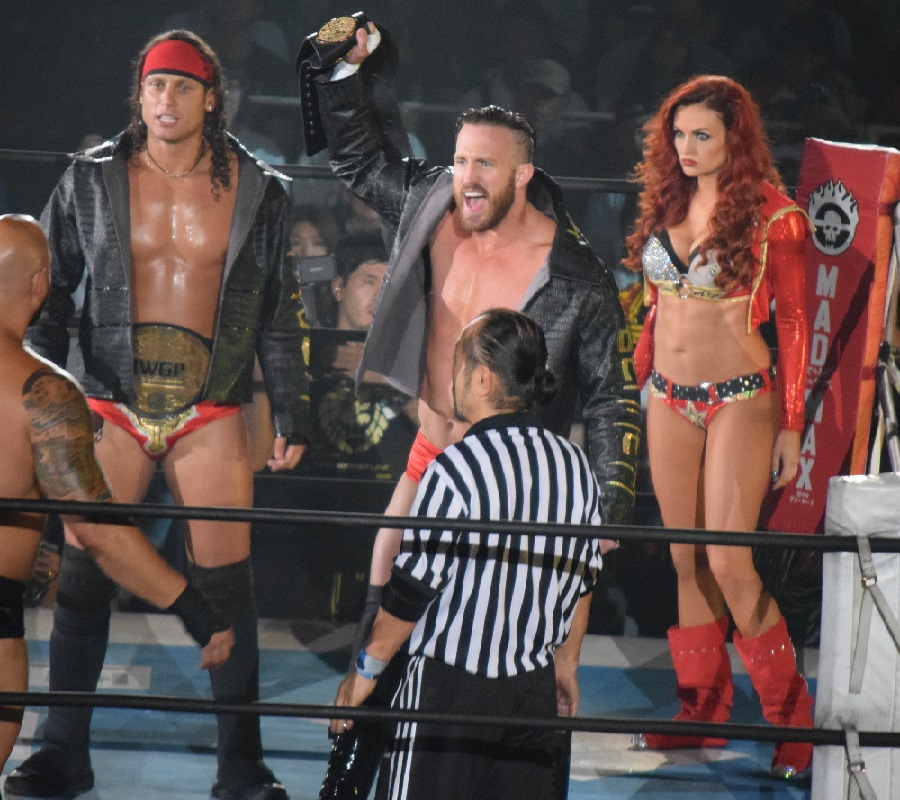
Matt Taven (left) and Mike Bennett (center) with Maria Kanellis-Bennett (right) as the IWGP Tag Team Champions in July 2015

- All Elite Wrestling
  - AEW International Championship (1 time) – Strong
- Consejo Mundial de Lucha Libre
  - NWA World Historic Welterweight Championship (1 time) – Taven
- Impact Wrestling
  - Impact World Tag Team Championship (1 time) – Bennett and Taven
- New Japan Pro-Wrestling
  - IWGP Tag Team Championship (1 time) – Bennett and Taven
- Ring of Honor
  - ROH World Championship (2 times) – Cole (1) and Taven (1)
  - ROH World Tag Team Championship (3 times) – Bennett and Taven
  - ROH World Six-Man Tag Team Championship (3 times, inaugural) – Taven, O'Ryan and Marseglia
  - Honor Rumble (2014) – Bennett
  - Survival of the Fittest (2014) – Cole
  - ROH World Six-Man Tag Team Championship Tournament (2016) – Taven, O'Ryan, and Marseglia
- The Wrestling Revolver
  - Revolver Tag Team Championship (1 time)

== See also ==
- The OGK
- The Undisputed Era
