= Great Northern Union =

Barbershop chorus based in Minnesota, US

Great Northern Union Chorus
- Choir
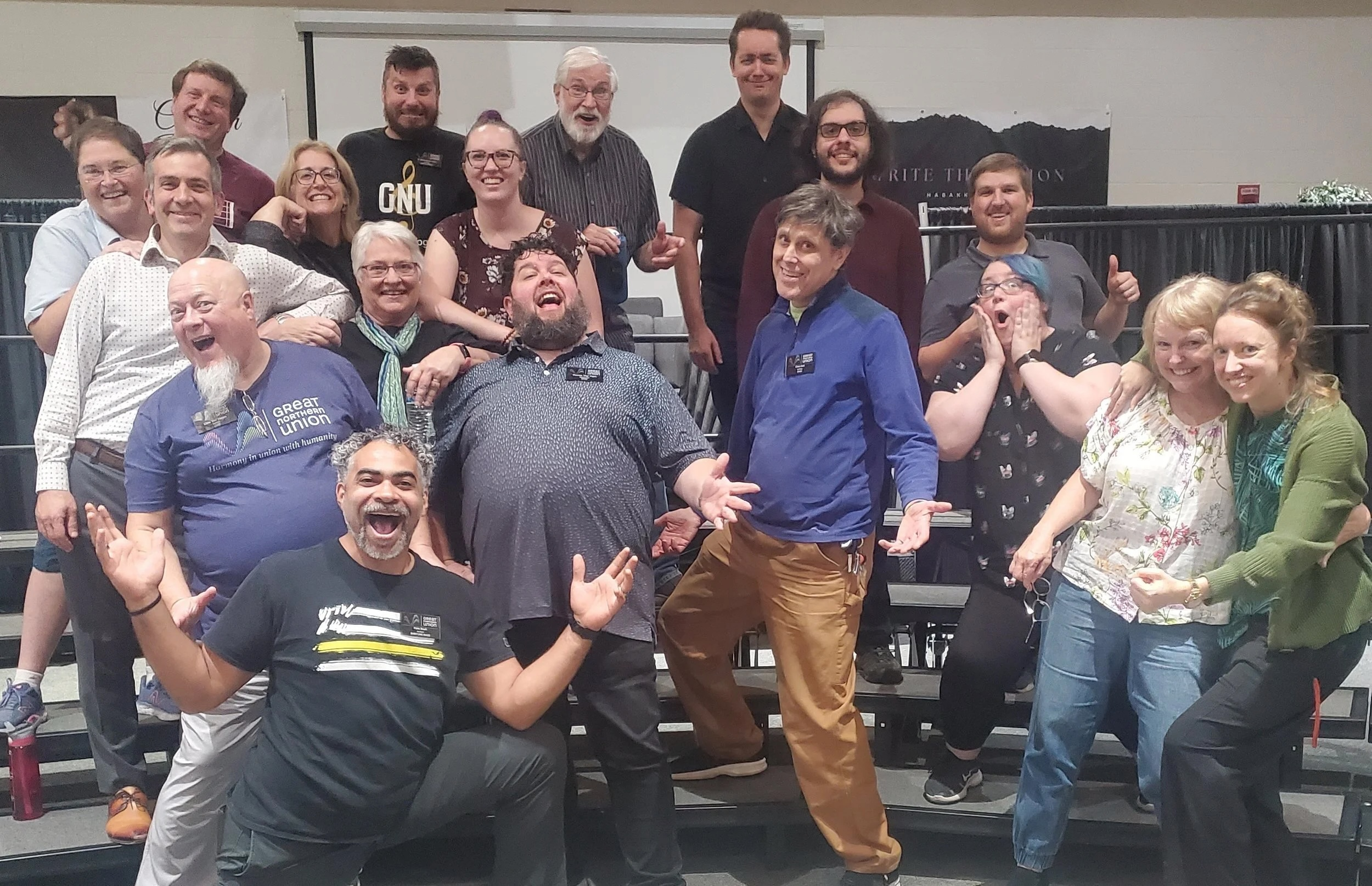
- Casual photo of members of the Great Northern Union Chorus, 2024
- Origin: Hilltop, Minnesota, United States
- Founded: 1986; 40 years ago
- Genre: Barbershop music
- Members: All-gender membership since 2020
- Website: www.greatnorthernunion.org

The Great Northern Union Chorus (GNU) is an all-gender chorus based in the Minneapolis–Saint Paul area of Minnesota. Founded in 1986 as a men's chorus, the group continues to perform mainly four-part harmony in the barbershop style. Since 2020, GNU has welcomed members of all genders. Officially, they are the Hilltop, Minnesota chapter in the Land o' Lakes District of the Barbershop Harmony Society (BHS) and remain active in competitions.

The chorus has placed in the top five at BHS International Chorus competitions 11 times, including consecutive second-place silver medals in 2011 and 2012.

Following the Barbershop Harmony Society's 2018 decision to admit everyone regardless of gender as full members, GNU became an all-voice chorus in 2020 and continues to participate in the society’s annual competitions.
