= GNU license =

A GNU license or GNU General Public License (GNU GPL), is a series of widely-used free software licenses that guarantee end users the freedom to run, study, share, and modify the software. Version 1 was released 25 February 1989 by Richard Stallman and its last version (3) was published on 29 June 2007. Meanwhile it has originated other derivations to address problems related to free software availability and usage as seen in the articles below.

GNU License may refer to:

- GNU General Public License
- GNU Lesser General Public License
- GNU Free Documentation License
- GNU Affero General Public License
