= 9965 GNU =

Asteroid

- Orbits of GNU (blue), the inner planets and Jupiter (outermost)

Discovery
- Discovered by: Spacewatch
- Discovery site: Kitt Peak National Obs.
- Discovery date: 5 March 1992

Designations
- Named after: GNU Project (free software project)
- Alternative designations: 1992 EF_{2} · 1988 BD_{4} 1993 QR_{3}
- Minor planet category: main-belt · (inner) background

Orbital characteristics
- Epoch 23 March 2018 (JD 2458200.5)
- Uncertainty parameter 0
- Observation arc: 30.17 yr (11,019 d)
- Aphelion: 2.8283 AU
- Perihelion: 2.0080 AU
- Semi-major axis: 2.4181 AU
- Eccentricity: 0.1696
- Orbital period (sidereal): 3.76 yr (1,373 d)
- Mean anomaly: 276.39°
- Mean motion: 0° 15^{m} 43.56^{s} / day
- Inclination: 12.206°
- Longitude of ascending node: 156.48°
- Argument of perihelion: 82.938°

Physical characteristics
- Mean diameter: 2.07±0.53 km 4.10 km (calculated); 6.22±2.14 km 6.293±0.159 km
- Synodic rotation period: 39.720±0.1589 h (R); 39.745±0.1589 h (S)
- Geometric albedo: 0.102±0.014; 0.1022±0.0145; 0.105±0.125; 0.20 (assumed); 0.53±0.12
- Spectral type: D (Pan-STARRS); S (SDSS-MOC); S (assumed)
- Absolute magnitude (H): 14.10; 14.3; 14.31±0.14; 14.398±0.005 (R); 14.72; 14.966±0.011 (S)

9965 GNU, provisional designation 1992 EF_{2}, is a background asteroid from the inner regions of the asteroid belt, approximately 4 kilometers (2 miles) in diameter. It was discovered on 5 March 1992, by astronomer of the Spacewatch program at the Kitt Peak National Observatory in Arizona, United States. The uncertain D-type asteroid has a long rotation period of 39.7 hours. It was named for the free-software GNU Project.

== Orbit and classification ==
GNU is a non-family asteroid from the main belt's background population.

It orbits the Sun in the inner asteroid belt at a distance of 2.0–2.8 AU once every 3 years and 9 months (1,373 days; semi-major axis of 2.42 AU). Its orbit has an eccentricity of 0.17 and an inclination of 12° with respect to the ecliptic. The body's observation arc begins with its first observation as 1988 BD_{4} at La Silla Observatory in January 1988, or 4 years prior to its official discovery observation at Kitt Peak.

== Physical characteristics ==
GNU has been characterized as a dark D-type asteroid by Pan-STARRS' survey and in the SDSS-based taxonomy. It is also an assumed S-type asteroid, the most common type in the inner asteroid belt.

=== Rotation period ===
In September and October 2012, two rotational lightcurves of GNU were obtained from photometric observations by astronomers at the Palomar Transient Factory in California. Lightcurve analysis gave a rotation period of 39.720 and 39.745 hours, with a brightness amplitude of 0.36 and 0.42 magnitude in the R- and S-band, respectively (U=2/2). While not being a slow rotator, GNU' period is significantly longer than the average spin rate of 2 to 20 hours, seen among the majority of asteroids.

=== Diameter and albedo ===
According to the survey carried out by the NEOWISE mission of NASA's Wide-field Infrared Survey Explorer, GNU measures between 2.07 and 6.293 kilometers in diameter and its surface has an albedo between 0.102 and 0.53. The Collaborative Asteroid Lightcurve Link assumes a standard albedo for a stony asteroid of 0.20 and calculates a diameter of 4.10 kilometers based on an absolute magnitude of 14.3.

== Naming ==
This minor planet was named for the free-software GNU Project, created by Richard Stallman 1984. GNU is the recursive acronym for "GNU is not Unix". The collaborative projects enables programmers to trade and improve upon free software. The official naming citation was published by the Minor Planet Center on 11 November 2000 (M.P.C. 41571).
