= Bethany, Connecticut =

- Town
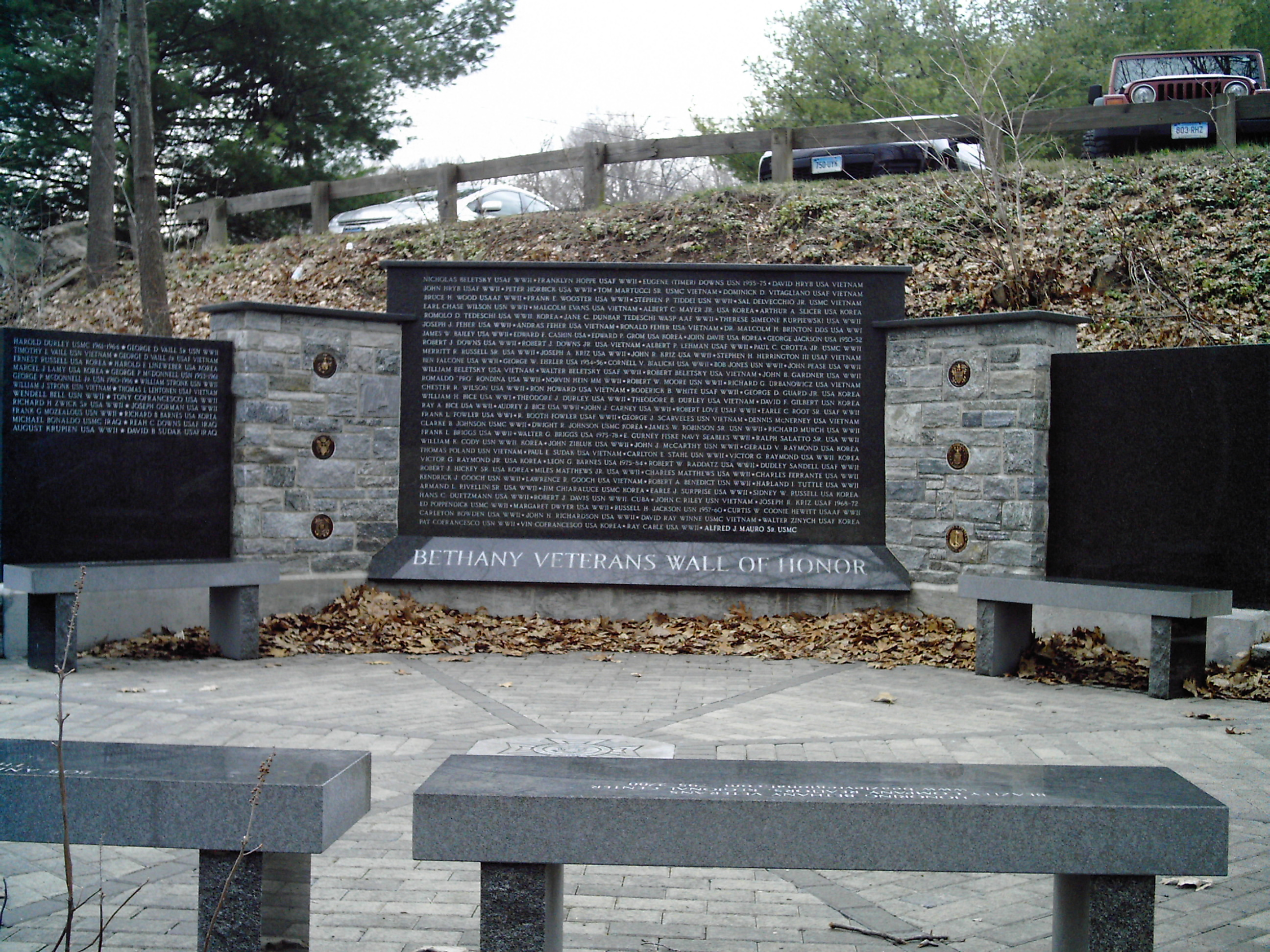
- Bethany Veterans Wall of Honor

- Seal
- Motto: "Rural Is Beautiful"
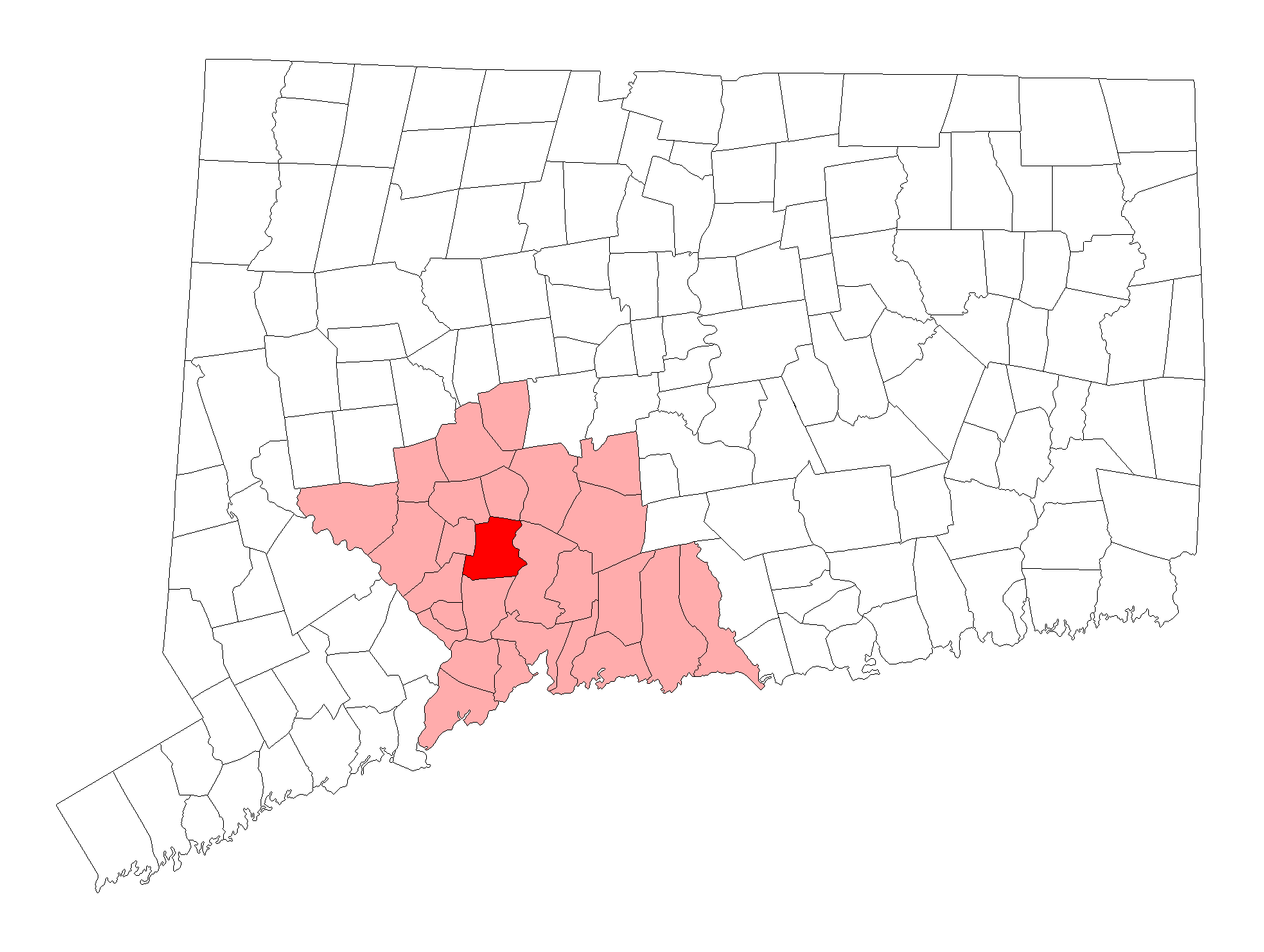
- Interactive map of Bethany, Connecticut
- Coordinates: 41°25′32″N 72°59′33″W
- Country: United States
- U.S. state: Connecticut
- County: New Haven
- Region: South Central CT
- Incorporated: 1832

Government
  - Type: Selectman-town meeting
  - First selectman: Carol R. Goldberg (D)
  - Selectman: Joseph Colaci (R)
  - Selectman: Amy Rushlow (D)

Area
  - Total: 21.4 sq mi (55.4 km^{2})
  - Land: 21.0 sq mi (54.3 km^{2})
  - Water: 0.39 sq mi (1.0 km^{2})
- Elevation: 574 ft (175 m)

Population (2020)
  - Total: 5,297
  - Density: 253/sq mi (97.6/km^{2})
- Time zone: UTC-5 (Eastern)
  - Summer (DST): UTC-4 (Eastern)
- ZIP code: 06524
- Area codes: 203/475
- FIPS code: 09-04580
- GNIS feature ID: 0213389
- Website: www.bethany-ct.com

Bethany is a town in New Haven County, Connecticut, United States. The town is part of the South Central Connecticut Planning Region. The population was 5,297 at the 2020 census.

== History ==
Bethany was first settled in 1717, but it was not until May 1832 that Bethany separated from Woodbridge to become incorporated as a town. This slightly remote, sparsely populated, residential town retains its rural character. There is some dairying and agriculture. The town is dotted with reservoirs serving Naugatuck and, principally, New Haven.

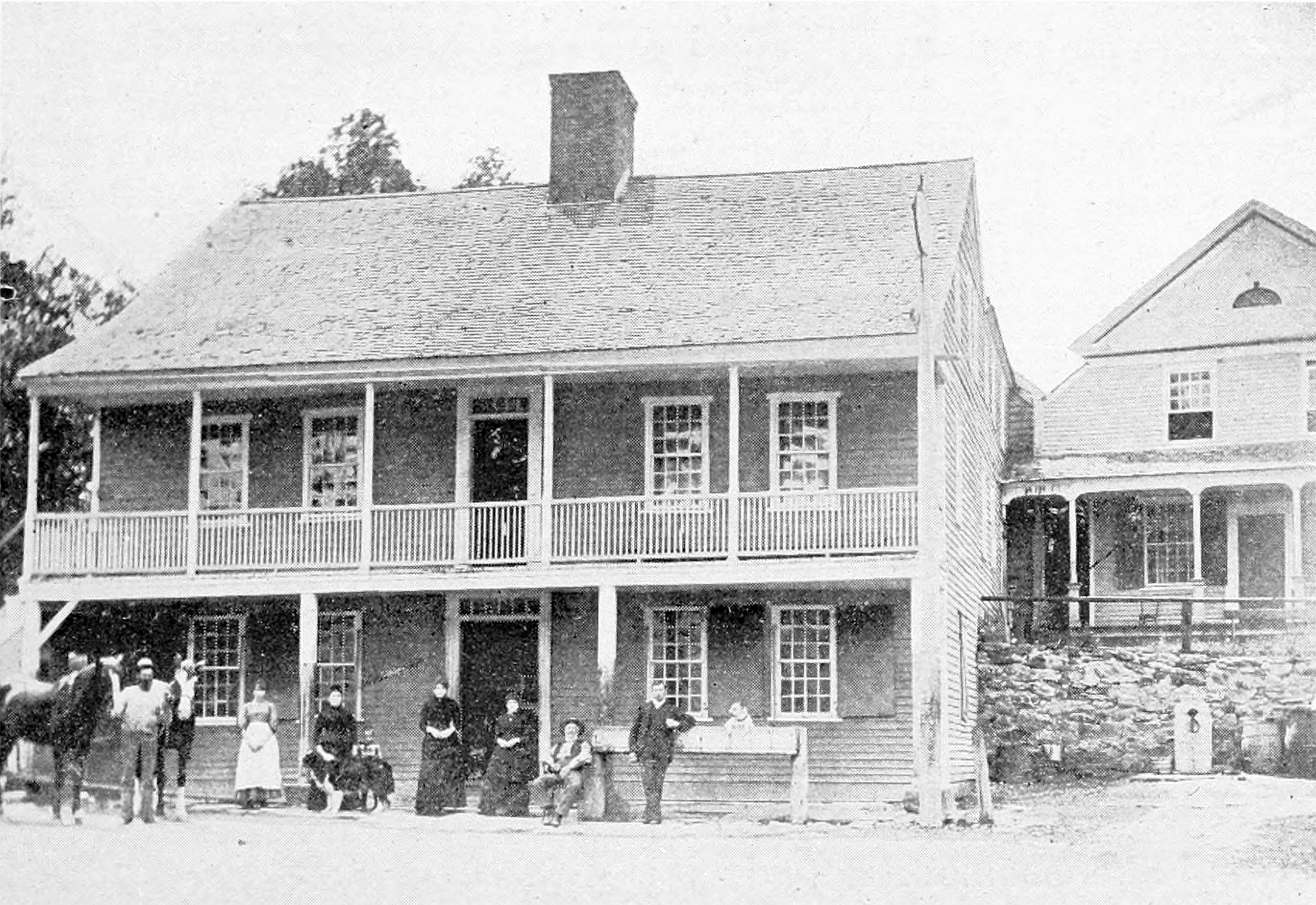
The Perkins Hotel in Bethany was used by travelers on the turnpike between New Haven and Waterbury, 1908.

There have been inhabitants in Bethany since before 1638, predominantly Naugatucks of the Paugusset tribe and Mattabessett of the Wanguck tribe. The first European settlers arrived in the area around April 1638, creating the towns of Milford and New Haven, with their boundary split down the middle of what is now Bethany. The area of the boundary was settled in 1678, twelve years after New Haven County was organized. In 1717, the Amity Parish was accepted by the General Assembly of the Connecticut Colony and in 1832, Bethany was incorporated as a town. The town is named after the biblical place.

In the mid-to-late 19th century, the population of the town and the land decreased as parts were annexed by the neighboring town of Woodbridge and the new town of Beacon Falls was incorporated into the general geography of Connecticut. The population would continue to decrease until about the 1940s, when the population would spike.

In 1923, the Bethany Airport opened up, one of the first in New England. Soon after, Troop I of the Boy Scouts of America (now known as Troop 931) was chartered in Bethany, and an organized police staff and volunteer firefighter organization was founded. In 1954, a senior high school was built in Woodbridge to serve Woodbridge, Bethany, and Orange. Earlier Bethany students had been sent to public high schools in neighboring towns as tuition students for grades nine through twelve. In 1963, Amity Junior High School was created in Bethany.

In 1970, Bethany Community School was finished, replacing most of the single roomed schools. The layout comprises a main campus and two four roomed schools, built in 1934. After the 1975 Ontario School shooting, they discontinued the four roomed schools for educational and safety reasons.

In 2007, Bethany was named Connecticut's #1 Small Town by Connecticut Magazine.

=== Town seal ===
Bethany's town seal is a circle within which appears a circle of rope. In the upper aspects of the seal appear the words TOWN OF BETHANY CONNECTICUT in two curved lines of print bordering the inner aspect of the rope circle. On the bottom of the seal also bordering the inner aspect of the rope circle, appear the words INCORPORATED 1832. These words form the top and bottom edges of a third circle, the sides of which are made of a string of inverted oak leaves on each side. A roadway bisecting the seal and extending from bottom to center is pictured within the innermost circle. Surrounded by trees are Christ Episcopal Church pictured on the right, and First Church of Christ Congregational with a carriage shed on the left. The Town Seal was created by local artist and Bethany resident, Betsy Seaton, as part of Bethany's 150th anniversary celebration in 1982.

=== 2024 Parks and Recreation scandal ===
In June 2024, Bethany Parks and Recreation employee Anthony Mastrangelo, a counselor in after‑school and summer programs, was arrested by the Connecticut State Police and charged with multiple counts of sexual assault and illegal sexual contact involving at least four minors from department programs. An independent investigation revealed that the town and local law enforcement received details of the police investigation in December 2022 and had taken no action since then.

== Geography ==
According to the United States Census Bureau, the town has a total area of 21.4 square miles (55 km^{2}), of which 21.0 square miles (54 km^{2}) is land and 0.4 square miles (1.0 km^{2}), or 1.83%, is water.

== Demographics ==
Historical population
Census	Pop.	Note	%±
1850	914		—
1860	974		6.6%
1870	1,135		16.5%
1880	637		−43.9%
1890	550		−13.7%
1900	517		−6.0%
1910	495		−4.3%
1920	411		−17.0%
1930	480		16.8%
1940	706		47.1%
1950	1,318		86.7%
1960	2,384		80.9%
1970	3,857		61.8%
1980	4,330		12.3%
1990	4,608		6.4%
2000	5,040		9.4%
2010	5,563		10.4%
2020	5,297		−4.8%
U.S. Decennial Census

As of the 2010 Census Bethany had a population of 5,563. The racial composition of the population was 91.6% white, 1.9% black or African American, 4.8% Asian, 0.6% other races and 1.1% from two or more races. 2.5% of the population was Hispanic or Latino of any race.

As of the census of 2000, there were 5,040 people, 1,755 households, and 1,449 families residing in the town. The population density was 240.4 inhabitants per square mile (92.8/km^{2}). There were 1,792 housing units at an average density of 85.5 per square mile (33.0/km^{2}). The racial makeup of the town was 95.04% White, 1.83% African American, 0.30% Native American, 1.53% Asian, 0.10% Pacific Islander, 0.48% from other races, and 0.73% from two or more races. Hispanic or Latino of any race were 2.02% of the population.

There were 1,755 households, out of which 40.2% had children under the age of 18 living with them, 73.8% were married couples living together, 6.6% had a female householder with no husband present, and 17.4% were non-families. 13.5% of all households were made up of individuals, and 5.5% had someone living alone who was 65 years of age or older. The average household size was 2.87 and the average family size was 3.18.

In the town, the population was spread out, with 27.3% under the age of 18, 4.6% from 18 to 24, 27.4% from 25 to 44, 28.4% from 45 to 64, and 12.3% who were 65 years of age or older. The median age was 41 years. For every 100 females, there were 99.5 males. For every 100 females age 18 and over, there were 95.1 males.

The median income for a household in the town was $74,898, and the median income for a family was $79,493. Males had a median income of $52,037 versus $44,427 for females. The per capita income for the town was $31,403. About 1.5% of families and 2.6% of the population were below the poverty line, including 4.1% of those under age 18 and 0.6% of those age 65 or over.

== Politics ==
Voter registration and party enrollment as of October 29, 2025
Party	Active voters	Inactive voters	Total voters	Percentage
Republican	1,141	57	1,198	26.92%
Democratic	1,231	69	1,300	29.21%
Unaffiliated	1,784	108	1,892	42.52%
Minor Parties	53	7	60	1.35%
Total	4,209	241	4,450	100%

Presidential Election Results
Year	Democratic	Republican	Third Parties
2024	50.3% 1,788	47.5% 1,688	2.2% 76
2020	51.7% 1,912	46.5% 1,718	1.8% 68
2016	46.8% 1,580	48.7% 1,646	4.5% 151
2012	50.6% 1,615	48.2% 1,536	1.2% 39
2008	53.1% 1,781	45.4% 1,525	1.5% 51
2004	48.91% 1,617	48.94% 1,618	2.15% 71
2000	49.2% 1,470	43.0% 1,285	7.8% 234
1996	46.3% 1,246	38.8% 1,047	14.9% 402
1992	37.1% 1,053	39.4% 1,117	23.5% 668
1988	39.7% 1,024	58.4% 1,505	1.9% 48
1984	34.5% 878	65.0% 1,654	0.5% 12
1980	27.8% 722	58.6% 1,490	13.1% 332
1976	38.4% 898	60.9% 1,427	0.7% 18
1972	32.2% 696	66.5% 1,433	1.3% 27
1968	34.3% 573	57.9% 967	7.8% 130
1964	51.1% 695	48.9% 664	0.00% 0
1960	35.8% 454	64.2% 814	0.00% 0
1956	26.7% 269	73.3% 741	0.00% 0

== Parks and recreation ==
In a span of two years (1997–1999), the town purchased 165 acres (0.67 km^{2}) of land for the new Veterans Memorial Park. In 1999, the man-made Hockanum Lake at Veterans Memorial Park was opened for swimming. In 2000, the first Summer Sparkler was held there.

== Notable people ==
- Amy Arnsten, neuroscientist
- Robert Crabtree, chemist
- David Hoadley (1774–1839), architect who worked in New Haven and Middlesex counties in Connecticut; designed Darius Beecher House in Bethany
- Silas Hoadley (1786–1870), clockmaker; born in Bethany
- R. W. B. Lewis (1917–2002), biographer and Yale professor
- Quincy Porter (1897–1966), Pulitzer Prize-winning American composer
- Katharine Weber, novelist
