= New England Pro Wrestling Hall of Fame and Fan Fest =

Professional wrestling hall of fame

The New England Pro Wrestling Hall of Fame and Fan Fest is an American professional wrestling hall of fame and fan convention. It was established in January 2008 to honor select wrestling personalities who have made significant contributions to professional wrestling in New England and the Northeastern United States.

== History ==
The idea for the hall of fame was conceived by Joseph Bruen, a longtime ring announcer and promoter in Massachusetts, who felt that wrestling personalities from the New England region, both regional and national, should be recognized for their achievements in pro wrestling. Inductees receive a commemorative plaque that have their names inscribed on it with the date of their induction into the hall of fame. The original Class of 2008 were inducted by Bruen's APCW Ringwars promotion; the induction ceremonies were featured at three supercards over the course of the year – Battleclash (March 29), Battlebowl (August 23), and Thanksgiving Meltdown (November 9) – all held at the American Legion in Seekonk, Massachusetts.

- APCW Battleclash (March 29, 2008) – Reverend Chain Branagan, Robbie Ellis, Sandy Starr, Cody Boyns, "Iceburg" Sonny Dee, Travis Funk, Anthony Rufo, Gary Gold, and Bert Centeno.
- ACPW Battlebowl (August 23, 2008) – Shane Simons, Tommy Degnan, "Sweet" Scott Ashworth, Brickhouse Baker, Lobsterman Jeff Costa, Rich Palladino, Jose Perez, and Terry Allen.
- APCW Thanksgiving Meltdown (November 9, 2008) – Bill Hardy, Danny Cama, Derek Molhan, Gary Apollo, Mark Amaral, Rip Morrison, "Chief" Dave Fox, Tony Rumble, and Walter "Killer" Kowalski.

Starting in 2009, the induction ceremonies have taken place at an annual banquet dinner at the Brotherhood of the Holy Ghost Charity Hall (Brightridge Club) in East Providence, Rhode Island. 2010 saw the first of the "fan fests", a two-day event in which inductees and special guests could interact with the fans, as well as the banquet dinner; one of the evening's highlights was the induction of the Savoldi wrestling family which included a speech from Angelo Savoldi who, at 95 years old, was the world's oldest living wrestler at the time. In addition to the hall of fame inductees, the event has also featured many wrestling stars at its "fan fest" weekend participating as guest speakers as well as autograph signings and Q&A sessions. The 2011 edition, for example, was hosted by longtime World Wrestling Federation ring announcer Howard Finkel and was attended by former inductees Ox Baker (2009) and "Dangerous" Danny Davis (2010) as well as Short Sleeve Sampson, The Iron Sheik, Brutus "The Barber" Beefcake, Doink the Clown, Paul Bearer, Tammy Lynn Sytch, Rosita, Balls Mahoney, Axl Rotten, Shane Douglas, Duane Gill, Armando Estrada, Kenny Dykstra, Jay Lethal, Antonio Thomas, and manager Johnny Fabulous. The Class of 2011 included Georgiann Makropoulos, Samula Anoa'i, Tito Santana, Rick Martel, and Chief Jay Strongbow; former WWF World Heavyweight Champion Bob Backlund made a surprise appearance during the second half of the induction ceremony. Jamison, a 1980s wrestling personality best remembered as the hapless television sidekick of Bobby "The Brain" Heenan on WWF Primetime Wrestling, made his first-ever appearance at a wrestling event to receive the "Most Entertaining Personality Award".

The New England Pro Wrestling Hall of Fame has recognized wrestling personalities from a number of different organizations from the "territory-era" World Wide Wrestling Federation, International World Class Championship Wrestling, Killer Kowalski's International Wrestling Federation, and Big Time Wrestling to modern-day "indy" promotions such as the All-Star Wrestling, Century Wrestling Alliance, Chaotic Wrestling, the Millennium Wrestling Federation, New England Championship Wrestling, New England Wrestling Alliance, Power League Wrestling, PWF Northeast, South Coast Championship Wrestling, and Yankee Pro Wrestling. Organizations from the East Coast of the United States have also been acknowledged including the East Coast Wrestling Association, Extreme Championship Wrestling, the House of Pain Wrestling Federation, New England Championship Wrestling, as well as the National Wrestling Alliance and World Wrestling Entertainment. As of 2011, it was Rhode Island's first and only wrestling convention, and the largest event in the New England region. A third New England Pro Wrestling Hall of Fame and Fan Fest was announced for June 9, 2012, however, it has since been postponed until the summer of 2013.

== Special awards ==
Name	Years active	Notes
Life Time Achievement Award	2010–	
"New England Icon" Award	2010–	
Manager of The Year Award	2010–	
Most Entertaining Personality Award	2011–	

== Inductees ==
Year	Ring name (Real name)^{[a]}	Inducted by	Inducted for	Notes^{[b]}
2008	Reverend Chain Branagan (Dave Jackson)		Managing	Managed various wrestlers during the 1990s and 2000s; responsible for bringing Kyle and Matt Storm into wrestling.
2008	Robbie Ellis (Rob Elowich)		Wrestling	Won the CPW Junior Heavyweight Championship (1 time), EWA Light Heavyweight Championship (1 time), IWCCW Light Heavyweight Championship (3 times), GMW World Lightweight Championship (2 time), NEPW Junior Heavyweight Championship (1 time), Ringside Wrestling Junior Heavyweight Championship (1 time)
2008	Sandy Starr		Wrestling	Popular female wrestler during the 1970s and 1980s; mainstay of many Northeastern promotions including Big Time Wrestling, International World Class Championship Wrestling, Johnny Powers' International Wrestling Association, and the World Wide Wrestling Federation
2008	Cody Boyns		Commentating	Longtime commentator and host for the cable access television series "Talking Wrestling" and radio show "Wrestling Rap" on WALE
2008	Sonny Dee		Wrestling	Won the UCW Cruiserweight Championship (1 time) and UCW Tag Team Championship (1 time)
2008	Travis Funk		Wrestling	UCW Tag Team Championship (1 time)
2008	Anthony Rufo		Wrestling	Won the NEWA Heavyweight Championship (1 time) Chaotic Wrestling King of Chaos trophy winner
2008	Gary Gold		Wrestling	Won the Ringside Wrestling Americas Championship (2 times)
2008	Bert Centeno		Wrestling	Won the CWA Light Heavyweight Championship (4 times), NEPW Junior Heavyweight Championship (1 time)
2008	Shane Simons		Wrestling	Won the PLW Heavyweight Championship (1 time), PLW New England Championship (2 times), PLW Tag Team Championship (3 times), and SCCW Tag Team Championship
2008	Tommy Degnan		Wrestling	Longtime ring announcer, booker, and promoter for Power League Wrestling; has announced for many New England–based promotions including Eastern Wrestling Alliance, Ringside Wrestling, PWF Northeast, House Of Bricks Pro Wrestling, Northeast Championship Wrestling, and Top Rope Promotions.
2008	Scott Ashworth		Wrestling	Won the YPW Interstate Heavyweight Championship (1 time)
2008	Brickhouse Baker		Wrestling	Owner/Operator of House Of Bricks Pro Wrestling. Won the YPW Interstate Heavyweight Championship (2 times)
2008	Jeff Costa		Wrestling and Promoting	Won the NEPW Tag Team Championship (1 time), Ringside Wrestling Americas Championship (1 time) and Ringside Wrestling Americas Tag Team Championship (2 times), and WIW Heavyweight Championship (1 time); founder of Ringside Wrestling/World Independent Wrestling.
2008	Rich Palladino		Announcer	Ring announcer for the Century Wrestling Alliance, Extreme Championship Wrestling, Millennium Wrestling Federation, New England Championship Wrestling, PWF Northeast, Chaotic Wrestling, and Yankee Pro Wrestling promotions.
2008	Jose Perez		Wrestling	Won the PWF Northeast Heavyweight Championship (1 time)
2008	Terry Allen		Wrestling and Promoting	Won the BTW Dog Collar Championship (1 time); revived the original Big Time Wrestling promotion.
2008	Bill Hardy	Joseph Bruen	Wrestling	Longtime "head of security" for many New England promotions
2008	Danny Cama	Joseph Bruen	Wrestling	Won the RIWA Television Championship (1 time)
2008	Derek Molhan	Shane Simons	Wrestling	Won the CCW Heavyweight Championship (1 time), NEPW Heavyweight Championship (1 time), NEPW Tag Team Championship (1 time), PLW Heavyweight Championship (1 time), PLW New England Heavyweight Championship (1 time), and Ringside Wrestling Americas Championship (2 times)
2008	Gary Apollo	Shane Simons	Wrestling	Journeyman wrestler during the 1980s and 1990s; one-half of the Apollo Brothers with Phil Apollo in the Killer Kowalski's International Wrestling Federation and International World Class Championship Wrestling
2008	Mark Amaral	Tommy Degnan	Wrestling and Promoting	Co-founder of Power League Wrestling. Won the PLW Heavyweight Championship (1 time), PLW New England Heavyweight Championship (3 times), the PLW Tag Team Championship (4 times).
2008	Rip Morrison	Maverick Wild	Wrestling	Won the GMW Television Championship (2 times), GMW Tag Team Championship (2 times), NECW Tag Team Championship (2 time), PLW Tag Team Championship (1 time), RWF Tag Team Championship (2 times), Ringside Wrestling Americas Tag Team Championship (1 time), WIW Heavyweight Championship (2 times), and WIW Tag Team Championship (3 times)
2008	Chief Dave Fox	Sonny Dee	Wrestling	Posthumous induction; won the Ringside Wrestling Junior Heavyweight Championship (1 time), Ringside Wrestling Americas Tag Team Championship (2 times), and WIW Tag Team Championship (1 time)
2008	Tony Rumble (Anthony Magliaro)	Trooper Gilmore	Wrestling, Managing and Promoting	Posthumous induction; won the CWA New England Heavyweight Championship (3 times); founder of the Century Wrestling Alliance.
2008	Walter "Killer" Kowalski	Freight Train, Bert Centeno, and Terry Allen	Wrestling	Posthumous induction; won the IWF Heavyweight Championship (1 time), WWWF United States Tag Team Championship (1 time), and WWWF World Tag Team Championship (1 time); founder of the International Wrestling Federation.
2009	Willie Jackson	Tommy Deegnan	Refereeing	
2009	Paul Lauzon	Shane Simons and Derek Molhan	Wrestling	Won the CPW Heavyweight Championship (1 time), NEPW Tag Team Championship (1 time), and PLW Heavyweight Championship (1 time); founder of Lethal Pro Wrestling.
2009	Gino Martino (John Ferraro)	Anthony Rufo	Wrestling	Won the BTW United States Heavyweight Championship (1 time), Chaotic Wrestling Heavyweight Championship (2 times), PLW Heavyweight Championship (1 time), UCW Heavyweight Championship (1 time), and WIW Heavyweight Championship (2 times)
2009	Dave Padula	Jose Perez	Wrestling	Won the PWF Northeast Mayhem Heavyweight Championship (2 times)
2009	Steve Bradley	Alex Arion	Wrestling	Posthumous induction; won the YPW Interstate Heavyweight Championship (1 time); founded the Wrestling Federation of America.
2009	The Power Company Twins (Dave and Dean Power)	The Soul Brothers, Brutus "The Barber" Beefcake, and Kevin Landry	Wrestling	Won the EWA Tag Team Championship (1 time)
2009	Jason Sanderson	Jeff Costa	Wrestling	Won the AWA New England Heavyweight Championship (1 time), AWA Tag Team Championship (1 time), and WIW Tag Team Championship (1 time)
2009	Jim Kettner	Simon Diamond	Promoting	Founder of the East Coast Wrestling Association; responsible for training many independent stars.
2009	Sheldon Goldberg	Matt Storm and DC Dillinger	Promoting	Founder of New England Championship Wrestling.
2009	Bobby Riedel	Jimmy Hart, Dickie Rodz, and Ted DiBiase	Managing and Promoting	Real-life manager and publicist to many high-profile wrestlers, most notably, Ted DiBiase; popularly known as "Agent to the Stars", he was involved in promoting the Rock 'n' Wrestling Connection during the 1980s wrestling boom
2009	Kevin Landry	Blaize Landry (son), Power Company Twins, and Johnny Idol	Wrestling	Popular star in the Northeast during the 1990s and 2000s; trainer of Tom Matera, Romeo Roselli, and Talia Madison
2009	Tony Atlas (Anthony White)		Wrestling	Won the CWA Heavyweight Championship (2 times), EWA Heavyweight Championship (1 time), IWCCW Heavyweight Championship (2 times), and NEPW Heavyweight Championship (1 time)
2009	Justin Credible (Peter Polaco)		Wrestling	Won the BTW Heavyweight Championship (1 time), ECW World Heavyweight Championship (1 time), ECW World Tag Team Championship (2 times), NEWA Tag Team Championship (1 time), and RWF Heavyweight Championship (1 time)
2009	Ox Baker (Douglas Baker)†^{[c]}	Travis Funk and Jason Sanderson	Wrestling	
2010	Billy Black	Kyle Storm	Wrestling	Won the NEWA Heavyweight Championship (2 times), PWF Northeast Heavyweight Championship (2 times), PWF Northeast Mayhem Heavyweight Championship (1 time), and UCW Heavyweight Championship (2 times)
2010	The Savoldi Family (Angelo, Mario, Joe, and Tom Savoldi)	Brian Webster	Wrestling	Founded International World Class Championship Wrestling
2010	Robbie Ellis (Rob Elowich)	N/A	Life Time Achievement Award	
2010	Kenny Casanova	Todd Taylor	Wrestling and Managing	Managed various wrestlers in the Northeast during the 1990s and 2000s.
2010	Mr. Biggs (Mike James)	Dan Bidondi	Wrestling	
2010	Maverick Wild (Scott Despres)	Rip Morrison	Wrestling	Won the AWA Americas Heavyweight Championship (1 time), AWA Tag Team Championship (1 time), EWA Heavyweight Championship (1 time), Chaotic Wrestling Heavyweight Championship (1 time), FRW All-Star Heavyweight Championship (1 time), FRW Granite State Championship (1 time), FRW Tag Team Championship (1 time), NECW Triple Crown Heavyweight Championship (2 times), NEWA Heavyweight Championship (3 times), NEWA Interstate Heavyweight Championship (1 time), WIW Americas Championship (1 time), WIW Heavyweight Championship (3 times), WIW Junior Heavyweight Championship (1 time), and WIW Tag Team Championship (1 time); founder of Front Row Wrestling.
2010	D. C. Drake (Don Drake)		Wrestling	
2010	Kevin Hughes	John Callahan	Wrestling	Journeyman wrestler during the 1980s; first-ever student trained by Killer Kowalski
2010	Sonny Goodspeed	DJ Baron and Johnny Vegas	Wrestling	Won the GMW Tag Team Championship (1 time), Ringside Wrestling Americas Championship (2 times), Ringside Wrestling Americas Tag Team Championship (1 time), and WIW Heavyweight Championship (2 times), and WIW Tag Team Championship (1 time)
2010	Bull Montana	Jason Rumble	Wrestling	
2010	John Cena, Sr.	N/A	Manager of The Year Award	Longtime announcer and manager in Chaotic Wrestling; promoter of the Millennium Wrestling Federation.
2010	Tim White	N/A	"New England Icon" Award	Longtime referee for the World Wrestling Federation
2010	The Public Enemy (Rocco Rock and Johnny Grunge)	Joel Davis	Wrestling	Posthumous induction; won the ECW World Tag Team Championship (4 times)
2010	Dr. Heresy	Antonio Thomas	Wrestling	Won the AWA Americas Heavyweight Championship (1 time), AWA New England Heavyweight Championship (1 time), AWA Tag Team Championship (1 time), FRW Tag Team Championship (3 times), PLW Heavyweight Championship (2 times), PLW New England Heavyweight Championship (1 time), and UCW Cruiserweight Championship (2 times)
2010	John Rambo (John Kreczman, Jr.)	Chuckie Manson and Cory Bush	Wrestling	
2010	Tony Ulysses	Paul Richard	Wrestling	Won the IWF Light Heavyweight Championship (1 time)
2010	Paul Richard	Sheldon Goldberg	Refereeing	Longtime referee for Extreme Championship Wrestling; responsible for promoting ECW in New England; promoter for New England Championship Wrestling.
2010	Pete Doherty	Peter Riendeau	Wrestling	
2010	Danny Davis	Mike Sparta	Refereeing	
2010	Larry Zbyszko	Mike Messier	Wrestling	
2010	Jimmy Snuka	Rich Palladino	Wrestling	
2011	Dogs of War (Kyle and Matt Storm)		Wrestling	Won the PWF Northeast Tag Team Championship (1 time)
2011	The O'Reilly Brothers; Sean and Tim O'Reilly		Wrestling	
2011	Gene Machain	Terry Machain (widow)	Wrestling	Posthumous induction; trainer at the House of Pain Wrestling Federation wrestling school.
2011	Johnny Vegas (John Vitale)		Wrestling	Won the AWA Americas Heavyweight Championship (2 times), AWA New England Heavyweight Championship (1 time), FRW All-Star Heavyweight Championship (2 times), FRW Tag Team Championship (2 times), and Ringside Wrestling Junior Heavyweight Championship (3 times)
2011	Joel Davis		Wrestling	Won the CPW Junior Heavyweight Championship (1 time), CWA Light Heavyweight Championship (1 time)
2011	Tony Santos, Jr.		Promoting	Posthumous induction; promoted of Big Time Wrestling with his father Tony Santos, Sr. during the late-1960s and 1970s.
2011	Tony Santos, Sr.		Promoting	Posthumous induction; founder of Big Time Wrestling.
2011	The Lake Sisters (Ann and Ruth Lake)		Wrestling	
2011	Richard Byrnes		Wrestling	Won the IWF Tag Team Championship (1 time), the NEWF Heavyweight Championship (1 time) and the NEWF Tag Team Championship (1 time); founded the New England Wrestling Federation.
2011	Tony Roy		Wrestling	Won the IWF Heavyweight Championship (1 time) and IWF North American Championship (1 time)
2011	John Callahan		Wrestling	Won the NEPW Heavyweight Championship (1 time) and NEPW Tag Team Championship (1 time)
2011	TJ Richter		Wrestling	Won the NECW Television Championship (1 time), PLW Heavyweight Championship (1 time), and PLW New England Heavyweight Championship (1 time)
2011	Terry Gunn		Wrestling	Journeyman wrestler for the World Wide Wrestling Federation during the 1970s; unofficially known as the "goodwill ambassador" of the Professional Wrestling Hall of Fame
2011	Tom Burke		Wrestling history	
2011	Dave Dwinell		Refereeing	Longtime referee in the World Wrestling Federation.
2011	Ebony Blade		Wrestling	Won the PWF Northeast Mayhem Heavyweight Championship (1 time) and UCW Heavyweight Championship (2 times)
2011	Georgiann Makropoulos		Wrestling history	
2011	Jameson (John DiGiacomo)		Most Entertaining Personality Award	Television personality for the World Wrestling Federation and sidekick of Bobby "The Brain" Heenan on WWF Primetime Wrestling
2011	Samula Anoa'i		Wrestling	
2011	Tito Santana (Merced Solis)		Wrestling	Won the IWCCW Heavyweight Championship (1 time)
2011	Rick Martel (Richard Vigneault)		Wrestling	
2011	Chief Jay Strongbow (Joe Scarpa)		Wrestling	Won the WWWF World Tag Team Championship (4 times)
2013	Mr. Fuji (Harry Fujiwara)		Managing and Wrestling	
2013	Kevin Sullivan		Wrestling	
2013	The Barbarian (Sione Vailahi)		Wrestling	
2013	The Warlord (Terry Szopinski)		Wrestling	
2013	Nelson Frazier		Wrestling	
2013	Bobby Knight		Wrestling	
2013	Oscar (Greg Girard)		Managing	
2013	Nikolai Volkoff (Josip Peruzović)		Wrestling	
2013	Michael Lombardi		Promoting	
2013	Tammy Sytch		Managing	
2013	Alex Payne		Wrestling	Won the PLW New England Championship (1 time) and PLW World Tag Team Championship (1 time)
2013	Kurt Adonis			
2013	Bull Curry (Fred Koury, Sr.)	Tom Burke	Wrestling	
2013	Mike Hollow		Wrestling	Longtime head trainer for head trainer for Killer Kowalski's wrestling school; won the NECW Heavyweight Championship (1 time).
2013	Jack Savage	Sandy Starr and John Callahan	Refereeing	
2013	Silvano Sousa (William Sousa)		Wrestling	
2013	Marcus O'Middleton (Marc Bazzle)		Wrestling	
2013	Mel Simons		Commentating	Longtime wrestling personality and WBZ radio host; one-time ring announcer for Killer Kowalski's “Bedlam from Boston” television show
2013	Brittany Brown		Wrestling	
2013	Larry Bonoff & the Warwick Musical Theatre		"New England Icon" Award	
2013	Peter B.		Managing and Refereeing	
2014	Jim Neidhart		Wrestling	
2014	Davey Boy Smith		Wrestling	
2014	Billy Silverman		Refereeing	
2014	Matt Borne		Wrestling	
2014	Mario Mancini (Leonard Inzitari)		Wrestling	
2014	Harley Race		Wrestling	7 times National Wrestling Alliance Heavyweight World Champion
2014	José Luis Rivera		Wrestling	Worked on the then-World Wide Wrestling Federation. He was also known as a member of The Conquistadors
2014	Knuckles Nelson (Brendan Higgins)		Wrestling	Won the CWA Television Championship (1 time), CWA Tag Team Championship (1 time), NWA New England Heavyweight Championship (1 time), NWA New England Television Championship (1 time), NWA New England Tag Team Championship (2 times), and NWA World Tag Team Championship (3 times)
2014	Draven		Wrestling	Won the Chaotic Wrestling Tag Team Championship (1 time), NCW Tag Team Championship (2 times), PLW New England Championship (1 time), PLW World Tag Team Championship (1 time), and WORLD-1 Tag Team Championship (2 times).
2014	Luis Ortiz		Wrestling	Won the Chaotic Wrestling Heavyweight Championship (2 times), Chaotic Wrestling New England Championship (3 times), Chaotic Wrestling Tag Team Championship (1 time), DPW Heavyweight Championship (1 time), DPW Tag Team Championship (1 time), NWA New England Heavyweight Championship (1 time), NWA New England Junior Heavyweight Championship (2 times), and NWA New England Tag Team Championship (2 times).
2014	Ron Zombie (Ron Celentano)		Wrestling	Won the ACW Heavyweight Championship (1 time), ACW Hardcore Championship (4 times), and NEW Heavyweight Championship (1 time)
2014	Curtis Slamdawg (Roger Minkler)		Wrestling	Won the NWA New England Heavyweight Championship (2 times) and NWA New England Tag Team Championship (1 time).
2014	Pat Piper (Pat McNeil)		Managing	
2014	Steve Stallion	Jose Perez	Wrestling	
2014	Jason Rumble (Jason DellaGatta)		Wrestling	Won the NWA World Junior Heavyweight Championship (3 times), NWA New England Heavyweight Championship (3 times), NWA New England Junior Heavyweight Championship (5 times), NWA New England X Division Championship (1 time), NWA New England Tag Team Championship (2 times), NWA On Fire Tag Team Championship (2 times), NECW Tag Team Championship (2 times), NWH Tag Team Championship (1 time), and UFO United States Championship (1 time).
2014	John Cena, Sr.		Managing and Promoting	
2014	Stacey Lopes		Wrestling	Co-owner of Unified Championship Wrestling.
2014	The Mercenary (Marvin Minkler)		Wrestling	Won the NWA New England Television Championship (1 time)
2015	Mean Gene Okerlund		Interviewer and announcer	Interviewer and announcer for the American Wrestling Association, World Wrestling Federation and World Championship Wrestling.
2015	Jim Cornette		Managing	Manager of The Midnight Express
2015	Slyck Wagner Brown		Wrestling	New England Championship Wrestling Heavyweight Champion (3 times)
2015	Erich Sbraccia		Wrestling	ICW Light Heavyweight Champion and two-time ICW Tag Team Champion.
2015	Jim Korderas		Referee	Professional wrestling referee from 1985 to 2012 for WWE
2015	Bobby Cruise		Ring announcer	Ring announcer and commentator for Atlantic Wrestling Federation, Eastern Wrestling Alliance, Premier Wrestling Federation, Yankee Pro Wrestling and Ring of Honor.
2015	Redemption		Wrestling	Longtime New England wrestler
2015	Short Sleeve Sampson		Midget wrestler	Worked for Micro Championship Wrestling, Midget Wrestling Warriors, Total Nonstop Action Wrestling and World Wrestling Entertainment
2015	"Heavenly" Johnny Angel		Wrestling	
2018	Perry Saturn		Wrestling	Has wrestled for promotions including Extreme Championship Wrestling, World Championship Wrestling, World Wrestling Entertainment and Total Nonstop Action Wrestling.
2018	Fred Curry Jr.		Wrestling	
2018	Beau Douglas		Wrestling	
2018	Dylan Kage		Wrestling	
2018	Alex Arion		Wrestling	
2018	"The Portuguese Princess" Ariel		Managing	
2018	Brain Fury		Wrestling	
2018	Hercules Hernandez		Wrestling	Best known as a member of the tag team of Power and Glory and the Heenan Family in the World Wrestling Federation
2018	Paul Roma		Wrestling	Best known as a member of the tag team of Power and Glory in World Wrestling Federation and part of the Four Horsemen in World Championship Wrestling
2018	Jimmy Valiant		Wrestling	Former WWWF World Tag Team Champion. A very popular wrestler working as the "Boogie Woogie Man" Jimmy Valiant in Jim Crockett Promotions and other territories
2018	Johnny Idol		Wrestling	
2018	Aaron Morrison		Wrestling	
2018	Ricky Sexton		Wrestling	
2019	Bill Apter		Wrestling journalist	Photographer and journalist specializing in professional wrestling. Best known as an editorial staff member and photographer for Pro Wrestling Illustrated and its sister publications during the 1970s, '80s and '90s.
2019	Gary Michael Capetta		Announcer	Professional wrestling ring announcer for World Wrestling Federation, American Wrestling Association and World Championship Wrestling
2019	Antonio Thomas		Wrestling	Best known for his stint in the World Wrestling Entertainment as one half of The Heart Throbs and in the New England independent circuit
2019	Romeo Roselli		Wrestling	Best known for his stint in the World Wrestling Entertainment as one half of The Heart Throbs, the New England independent circuit and Total Nonstop Action Wrestling TNA
2019	Jeff Katz		Wrestling	
2019	Chris Venom		Wrestling	
2019	Jay Jaillet		Wrestling	
2019	" The Guardian of Chaos " Big Daddy		Wrestling Manager & Commentator	
2019	Mistress Belmont		Wrestling	
2019	John "Dropkick" Murphy		Wrestling	
2019	Tre The Smooth Operating Gangsta		Wrestling	
2023	Steve Taylor		Wrestling	
2023	D. C. Drake		Wrestling	
2023	James Allen		Wrestling	
2023	Mike McGuirk		Wrestling	
2023	Joel Gertner		Wrestling	
2023	Don Vega		Wrestling	
2023	George Carroll Jr.		Wrestling	
2023	Barry Horowitz		Wrestling	
2023	Richard Lannon		Referee	
2023	Paula J. Lucier		Wrestling	Shuhei Aoki Humanitarian Award
2023	John Xavier		Wrestling	
2023	Paul Perez		Wrestling	
2023	D.C. Dillinger		Wrestling	

== See also ==
- List of professional wrestling conventions
- List of professional wrestling halls of fame

== Footnotes ==
- ^{a} – Entries without a birth name indicates that the inductee did not perform under a ring name.
- ^{b} – This section mainly lists the major accomplishments of each inductee in New England.
- ^{c} – Wrestler was originally inducted as part of the inaugural Class of 2008 ceremonies but was unable to attend; their "official" ceremony took place at the 2009 edition of the New England Pro Wrestling Hall of Fame.
