= Jason Rumble =

American professional wrestler

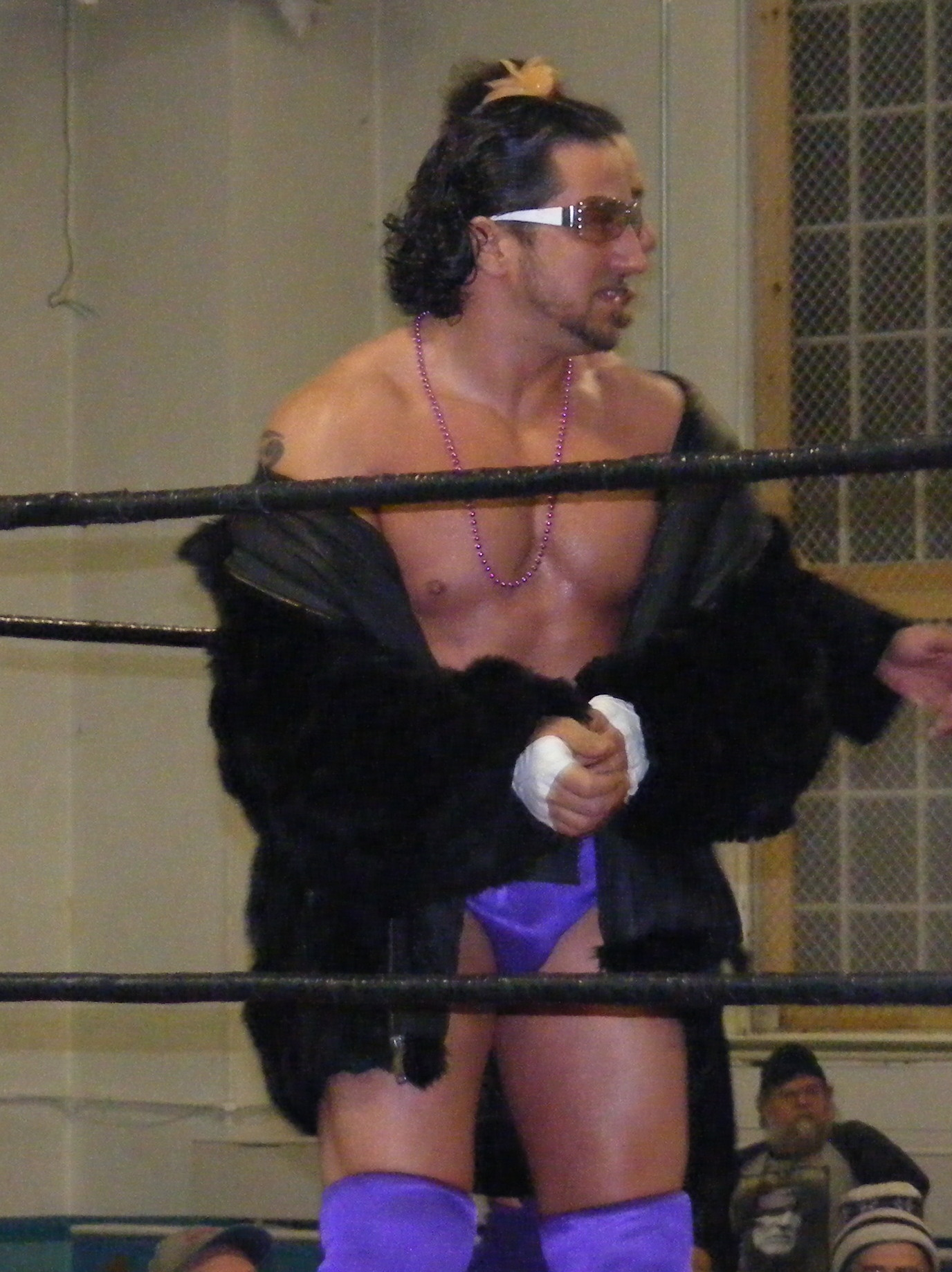
- Rumble in 2010

Personal information
- Born: Jason DellaGatta; July 18, 1972 (age 54) Malden, Massachusetts, United States
- Website: Official website

Professional wrestling career
- Ring name(s): Bad Boy Jason; Jason Maggliaro; Jason Rage; Jason Rumble
- Billed height: 5 ft 9 in (175 cm)
- Billed weight: 203 lb (92 kg)
- Billed from: The Combat Zone; Boston, Massachusetts
- Trained by: Killer Kowalski; Tony Rumble
- Debut: February 14, 1997

Jason DellaGatta (born July 18, 1972) is an American professional wrestler, trainer, and promoter, best known by his ring name Jason Rumble.

DellaGatta was a longtime star of NWA New England and, following Tony Rumble's death in 1999, adopted the "Boston Bad Boy" gimmick in honor of his mentor. He was promoted as Tony's kayfabe son, at the request of the Magliaro family, and considered the "face" of the company for much of its remaining seven years in operation. DellaGatta also briefly served as the booker for NWA New England, succeeding Jeff Katz and Knuckles Nelson, and headed a second incarnation of Tony Rumble's "heel" stable The Brotherhood consisting of himself, Rick Fuller, and The DarkAngel. He has held the NWA New England Heavyweight Championship (3 times), NWA New England Junior Heavyweight Championship (5 times), NWA New England X Division Championship (1 time), and NWA New England Tag Team Championship (2 times) with Slyck Wagner Brown and Luis Ortiz; at the 2005 Tony Rumble Memorial Show, he won the Heavyweight, Cruiserweight, and Division X titles.

A former 3-time NWA World Junior Heavyweight Champion, DellaGatta was considered one of the top light heavyweight wrestlers in the National Wrestling Alliance during the 2000s. He represented NWA New England at the NWA Anniversary Shows from 2000 to 2005, headlining three of his five appearances. In addition, he competed in the 2002 Jersey J-Cup as well as participating in international tours to Canada and the United Kingdom. DellaGatta also had brief stints in Total Nonstop Action Wrestling and World Wrestling Entertainment, participating in the WWE's Master Lock Challenge during 2005.

From 2008 to 2010, DellaGatta teamed with Darling Damon as The Crown Jewels in New England Championship Wrestling and NWA On Fire winning the tag team titles in both promotions; they held the NECW Tag Team Championship for 15 months making them the longest reigning champions in the company's history. They proved to be a controversial duo, especially given the "family friendly" style of the former company, as two "flamboyant" men whose ring style was similar to the Christopher Street Connection or WWE's Billy and Chuck. They were joined by "Mr. Fabulous" Tony Ulysses, who employed a similar persona in Killer Kowalski's All Star Wrestling during the 1980s, as their stylist and lifestyle consultant.

In recent years, DellaGatta has been closely associated with Victory Championship Wrestling, a member of the recently revived Century Wrestling Alliance. In 2010, he and several other wrestlers established the Bell Time Club, a private social club and training facility open to both pro wrestlers and members of the public, which runs wrestling events though VCW.

In 2016, Rumble returned to Independent Wrestling Entertainment in Brewer, Maine, as the new booker and head trainer for the Cruiserweight Division.

Jason Rumble also has been making appearances for Canadian Wrestling Promotions in New Brunswick, Canada, since 2016 for NWE Pro Wrestling and Mainstream Wrestling NB.

== Early life ==
A native of Malden, Massachusetts, Jason DellaGatta was born to Joseph R. Dellagatta and Mary Kelliher. He was extensively involved in little league and high school baseball, basketball, and football throughout his childhood. After his graduation from Malden High School in 1992, DellaGatta initially worked for a local moving company while continuing to compete amateur sports. He formed his own team to play in a Boston night league around 1994. Their performance in the league, consisting primarily of college football players, impressed a scout from a semi-professional football organization, the New England Football League. DellaGatta and several of his teammates were eventually recruited with DellaGatta playing for the New England Stars. He would go on to play five seasons with the league becoming a 2-time NEFL All-Pro and named "Special teams player of the Year" in his final season. He also developed a close friendship with league owner Joe Monaco.

== Professional wrestling career ==
=== Early career ===
It was while playing for the NEFL that, at age 25, he began working out at the famed Malden Square training facility run by Water "Killer" Kowalski. DellaGatta later admitted that he had regularly walked past the building while attending Malden High and, despite being a wrestling fan, was unaware that it was a wrestling school. He often attended World Wrestling Federation events at the old Boston Garden during the 1980s and considered "Superfly" Jimmy Snuka a childhood hero. He often watched the Savoldi family's International Championship Wrestling and later became a fan of the Century Wrestling Alliance, the predecessor of NWA New England. He first gave serious thought to becoming a pro wrestler after attending his first-ever CWA live event in Revere, Massachusetts. A gifted student, DellaGatta completed his training under Kowalski within four months and made his pro debut as "Jason Rage" on February 14, 1997. He continued working at Kowalski's "Institute of Professional Wrestling", as did many New England independent wrestlers, for years afterwards.

A broken collarbone suffered while playing football put a sudden stop to his wrestling career after four months, and kept him out of action for the next six months. Worried that future injuries might hurt his pro wrestling career, he decided to retire from the NEFL to wrestle full-time. A year after his debut Kowalski arranged for DellaGatta to wrestle his first major opponent, "Mr. USA" Tony Atlas. He also started traveling to Maine two to three times a month to wrestle for Eastern Wrestling Alliance and later on appeared in other states such as the Florida-based Future of Wrestling promotion.

=== NWA New England (1998–2000) ===
It was during this period that many of Kowalski's students were now competing in the local independent circuit and DellaGatta found it difficult to get booked after returning from his collarbone injury. A Malden basketball coach, who also trained at Kowalski's school as Tre the Smooth Operating Gangsta, recommended DellaGatta when Tony Rumble was looking for talent for the newly established NWA New England; DellaGatta has since credited his old coach whose introduction led to the close relationship he later enjoyed with Rumble and his family.

DellaGatta began wrestling for the promotion in early 1998. He first teamed with Slyk Wagner Brown and received several title shots against then NWA New England Tag Team Champions The Ark Angels (Phoenix King and Damon D'Archangelo). He also worked to establish himself as singles competitor and, on August 22, he defeated Jeff Mangles for the NWA New England Junior Heavyweight Championship in Somerville, Massachusetts. He followed this up with a successful title defense against Jay Jaillet and Luis Ortiz at a house show in Thomaston, Connecticut, on October 2, 1999. He held on to the title for five months before dropping the belt back to Jeff Mangles in a Triple Threat match also involving Slyk Wagner Brown early the next year; the title was declared vacant soon afterwards and he and Luis Ortiz wrestled in Southbridge, Massachusetts, to decide a new champion, a match which DellaGatta lost.

DellaGatta returned to the tag team division in mid-2000 and teamed with Slyk Wagner Brown and Luis Ortiz to win the vacant NWA New England Tag Team Championship in a Triangle match against Nemesis & Scarecrow and the Millennium Killaz (Muhammad the Butcher & Gino Martino) on June 22, 2000. Though beaten for the titles a month later by the Millennium Killaz, DellaGatta and Ortiz regained the belts on August 24 and remained champions until the tag titles were vacated at the end of the year. He frequently appeared on its weekly television show, "Mass Madness", with one of his later matches being a tag team match with Dukes Dalton against The Bushwhackers (Butch and Luke).

=== Birth of the "Boston Bad Boy" (2000) ===
On November 13, 1999, Tony Rumble died of a massive heart attack near his Malden home. DellaGatta has claimed the day of Rumble's death was one of the saddest in his life and later had Rumble's name and the date of his passing tattooed on his left arm.

The promotion was run by Jeff Katz and Knuckles Nelson for the first six months after Rumble's death. Due to steadily declining attendance Rumble's widow Ellen Magliaro turned control of the promotion over to DellaGatta. He had recently held a successful fundraiser for a friend and fellow pro wrestler, Jeff Mangles, who had broken both of his legs in a recent accident. In spite of having little prior experience as a promoter, his efforts to arrange the show was the deciding factor in Magliaro deciding on DellaGatta to run the day-to-day operations. She and the Rumble family also requested that DellaGatta continue the "Boston Bad Boy" in-ring persona by competing as "Boston Bad Boy" Jason Rumble, the kayfabe son of Tony.

The decision to make DellaGatta the "face" of the company so early in his career was a controversial one and created animosity in the already divided Boston independent scene. Many wrestlers, some of whom saw this as blatant opportunism on the part of DellaGatta, were unaware that he had taken on the Rumble name at the request the Ellen Magliaro and his two step-daughters to keep Tony Rumble's memory alive. Sheldon Goldberg, unhappy with the situation, resigned his position with the company to start his own promotion, New England Championship Wrestling; Goldberg later commented that, while crediting him as "a good athlete and a good talent", DellaGatta's long-term career as a performer was hurt because of it.

DellaGatta was able to stabilize the promotion but struggled to keep the promotion during his tenure as booker. A number of factors, including the mismanagement of Katz and Nelson, DellaGatta's inexperience, and increasing competition from Chaotic Wrestling, the Millennium Wrestling Federation, New England Championship Wrestling and other rival groups, prevented the promotion from reclaiming its former position as New England's top promotion. NWA New England began experiencing trouble booking events in 2002 and finally went on year-long hiatus following a fundraiser in Riverside, Rhode Island, for victims of the Station nightclub fire in April 2003.

=== NWA New England (2000–2001) ===
DellaGatta was introduced as Jason Rumble at the Jeff Mangles Tribute Show held in the summer of 2000. He won a Ladder match in the main event in which the wrestler who could successfully retrieve Tony Rumble's batting helmet would become the new "Boston Bad Boy". Representing his home promotion at the NWA 52nd Anniversary Show in Nashville, Tennessee, DellaGatta wrestled "Backhome" Beau Douglas in the main event and won the then vacant NWA New England Heavyweight Championship after forcing Douglas to submit to a Boston crab; their match was dedicated to the memory of Tony Rumble. He also formed a "second generation" of Tony Rumble's heel stable The Brotherhood consisting of himself, Rick Fuller, and The DarkAngel.

On January 15, 2001, DellaGatta received a tryout match with the World Wrestling Federation, wrestling as "Jason Rage", when he and Steve Boz wrestled Lo Down (Chaz and D-Lo Brown) at the sold-out Bradley Center in Milwaukee, Wisconsin, the match later being aired on WWE Jakked; he was brought back for the Masterlock Challenge a few years later. In May, DellaGatta briefly lost the NWA New England Heavyweight Championship to Steve King in Melrose, Massachusetts but regained it two weeks later remained champion for the rest of the year.

=== National Wrestling Alliance (2001–2002) ===
DellaGatta's status in NWA New England soon brought him to the attention of the National Wrestling Alliance. On August 21, 2001, he unexpectedly helped NWA Florida star Lex Lovett defeat Mike Thunder for the NWA World Junior Heavyweight Championship in Tampa, Florida. DellaGatta then turned on Lovett attacking him after the match and challenging Lovett to a match at the upcoming NWA 53rd Anniversary Show. A month later, DellaGatta wrestled NWA Florida Junior Heavyweight Champion Jet Jaguar at NWA Florida's "Battle of the Belts", an interpromotional supercard featuring wrestlers from IPW Hardcore, NWA Wildside, and Turnbuckle Championship Wrestling, held at Tampa's Fort Homer Hesterly Armory.

On October 13, he returned to Florida once again for the NWA 53rd Anniversary Show at The Wrestleplex in St. Petersburg where he pinned Lex Lovett for the NWA World Junior Heavyweight Championship in a Fatal Five-Way match also involving Jimmy Rave, Brandon K, and BJ Turner. Shortly after winning the World Junior Heavyweight Championship, he lost NWA New England Heavyweight title to Beau Douglas on October 27, 2001, in Woburn, Massachusetts.

DellaGatta continued to defend the NWA World Junior Heavyweight Championship for the next few months, most notably, successfully defending the title against JB Destiny at NWA East's "Clash of the Champions" in McKeesport, Pennsylvania on December 15, 2001. He traded the title with Rocky Reynolds in early 2002, first losing the title at a Pro Wrestling eXpress event in Titusville, Pennsylvania, on February 2 and regaining it 14 days later in his hometown of Malden, Massachusetts. Reynolds defeated DellaGatta for a second and final time in Parkersburg, West Virginia, on April 6, 2002.

=== NWA New England (2002–2003) ===
DellaGatta subsequently returned to NWA New England where he defeated Kid Narcissistic for the NWA New England Junior Heavyweight Championship in Woonsocket, Rhode Island two weeks later. He re-lost the title to Kid Narcissistic on June 1 and failed to regain the belt at NWA New England's "Summer Sizzler" two days later; the title was declared vacant soon afterwards. That same weekend, he took part in the third-annual Jersey J-Cup but was eliminated in the opening rounds by Scoot Andrews.

DellaGatta regained the vacant NWA New England Junior Heavyweight title during the summer but was stripped of the belt due to outside interference at a July 13 title defense. He once again regained the junior heavyweight title three months later, this time from Tommy Knoxville, to begin his fourth championship reign. On October 2, 2002, DellaGatta lost to Lex Lovett a three-way match also involving Steve Madison for IPW Hardcore Wrestling at the Dallas Bull in Tampa. He also appeared at the October 26th NWA 54th Anniversary Show in Corpus Christi, Texas, where he avenged his World Junior Heavyweight title loss by pinning Rocky Reynolds; the match was to decide the number one contender for the NWA World Junior Heavyweight Championship. AJ Styles and Mortimer Plumtree, on the pretense of scouting talent for TNA's "X-Division", unsuccessfully attempted to interfere on Reynolds' behalf and attacked DellaGatta after the match. NWA World Tag Team Champions America's Most Wanted (Chris Harris and James Storm) came out to stop the attack, however, a wild brawl ensued and ended up involving any wrestlers from the locker room to break it up.

DellaGatta eventually lost the NWA New England Junior Heavyweight Championship during a tag team match with Paulie Gilmore against Captain Charisma and Spider in Lowell, Massachusetts, the following year; the victors were named co-champions and defended the title for several months before the title was abandoned at the end of 2003.

=== Total Nonstop Action Wrestling (2003–2004) ===
In early 2003, DellaGatta started wrestling for Total Nonstop Action Wrestling. He made his TNA debut at the February 5th edition of TNA Xplosion, a live pay-per-view event from the TNA Asylum in Nashville, Tennessee. He teamed with longtime rival Rocky Reynolds to challenge America's Most Wanted (Chris Harris and James Storm) and lost when Storm pinned Reynolds. He came back to TNA a year later losing to James Storm in a singles match on March 24, 2004. One of his last appearances for the company was a tag team match with Sonny Roselli against 3Live Kru (Konnan and B.G. James) at Nashville's Fairgrounds Coliseum on August 8, 2004, which they lost when Roselli submitted to the Tequila Sunrise.

=== NWA New England (2004–2006) ===
When NWA New England resumed operations in 2004, this time with new bookers Chad Merchant and Chad Peters, DellaGatta was one of the mainstays which returned to the promotion. During the time it was inactive, he wrestled for other Northeastern "indy" promotions including Madmar Entertainment, Ultimate Championship Wrestling, and Assault Championship Wrestling. He participated in several cross-promotional shows with New Wrestling Horizons over the summer. DellaGatta won a 6-man Gauntlet match against Larry Huntley, Hardware, Cameron Mathews, Osirus, and Sonny Roselli on May 25, a handicap match against The Elite (Larry Huntley and Sonny Roselli) on August 13, and Huntley in a singles match on August 17. He did lose to NWA New England Brass Knuckles Champion Gino Martino in a number one contendership match for the NWH Heavyweight Championship on September 28, 2004, in Buxton, Maine.

=== Final run as World Junior Heavyweight Champion (2004–2005) ===
On October 17, 2004, DellaGatta regained the NWA World Junior Heavyweight Championship at the NWA 56th Anniversary Show in Winnipeg, Manitoba by defeating Jerrelle Clark and Vance Desmond in an "elimination" match. On February 5, 2005, he defeated Clark in a rematch at New World Wrestling's "Extreme Revenge" in Bellingham, Massachusetts. He also traveled overseas to the United Kingdom to defend his title against Phil Powers at a June 4 Revolution British Wrestling show at Ryan Hall in Chingford. DellaGatta third and final championship reign ended following his defeat by Black Tiger at Columbia, Tennessee, on August 25, 2005.

=== Independent circuit (2005–2006) ===
Back in New England, DellaGatta continued competing for various promotions in the Massachusetts area. In September 2005, he took part in a Founder's Day benefit show for the Saugus public school system, organized by Everett-based wrestling academy Ringside Entertainment, appearing with Brutus "The Barber" Beefcake, Ebony Blade, Lollipop, and midget wrestler Short Sleeve Sampson. On October 8, 2005, he returned to Nashville for the NWA 57th Anniversary Show where he pinned Mark Moment. He also appeared for the 6th annual Tony Rumble Memorial Show in Everett, Massachusetts, on November 25, 2005.

DellaGatta then headed to the Southern United States where he wrestled for New Generation Wrestling at an event in Pickens, South Carolina, on February 18, 2006, wrestling in a 6-man tag team match with John Thornhill and Shane Matthews against Chris Hamrick, Chase Stevens, and Dollar D. That summer, he was back in New England where he showed up in New World Wrestling and All Out Mayhem, wrestling Palmer Canon for the latter promotion in South Portland, Maine, on May 18, 2006.

=== Century Wrestling Alliance (2006–2007) ===
DellaGatta remained with the NWA New England during its last year of operation. On July 30, 2006, in Sanford, Maine, he was part of a 10-man elimination match teaming with Larry Huntley, Beau Douglas, Lotus, and Eric Atlas to defeat Osirus, Craig Trace, Loco, F.O., and Christian Sane. Two months later, he lost a three-way match against Matt Ledge and Beau Douglas for NWA New England X Division Championship at the Cardinal Shehen Center in Bridgeport, Connecticut. On November 25, 2006, at the 7th annual Tony Rumble Memorial Show in Saugus, Massachusetts, DellaGatta made NWA New England history by winning the promotion's heavyweight, Cruiserweight, and X-Division titles in a single night. He first won a five-way match involving T.N.T., "Black Lotus" Matt Ledge, Paul Hudson, and Cameron Matthews to win both the Cruiserweight and X-Division titles. Later on in the show, he won the "Tony Rumble Memorial Battle Royal", with the assistance of manager Johnny Fabulous, and went on to defeat Luis Ortiz and Slyck Wagner Brown in a Triple Threat match to win the heavyweight championship. Three months later, he also wrestled Larry Huntly in a losing bid to capture the vacant AWA North Atlantic Heavyweight Championship.

On March 10, 2007, Beau Douglas defeated DellaGatta for the NWA New England Heavyweight title in Saugus, Massachusetts, ending his third reign as champion. Douglas had originally lost the title to Rumble six years earlier at the NWA 52nd Anniversary Show in Nashville, Tennessee. It was also announced at that event that the promotion would be withdrawing its membership with the National Wrestling Alliance and reverted to its original Century Wrestling Alliance name.

=== Touring Canada with the "Sea Side Slam Tour" (2007) ===
In May 2007, DellaGatta was one of several American independent stars which participated in MainStream Wrestling Entertainment's 6th annual "Sea Side Slam Tour" which visited 10 cities in Newfoundland and Nova Scotia over a two-week period. One of the highlights of the tour was a Fatal Four Way match in Windsor between DellaGatta, Scott Savage, "The Bollywood Don" Harv Sihra, and "X-Ray" Kyle Kruze, which Kruze won; both Kruze's MSW Atlantic Canadian Championship and CWA Cruiserweight Championship was on the line.

=== Millennium Wrestling Federation (2007–2008) ===
After NWA New England ceased operations, DellaGatta was brought into the Millennium Wrestling Federation where he aligned himself with Johnny Fabulous and The Uprising (Joey Mercury and MWF Tag Team Champions The Canadian Superstars – Dave Cole & J-Busta). At MWF's August 4 supercard "Soul Survivor IV" DellaGatta lost to Tiger Mulligan at the Good Time Emporium in Somerville, Massachusetts. He also was a regular on its weekly television show MWF Ultra. Some highlights included matches against Slyck Wagner Brown (December 2007) and a tag team match pitting he and stablemate Jimmy Jact Ca$h against Beau Douglas and Al Snow (March 2008). In April 2008, he took on MWF original "Straight Edge" Brian Fury, who was making his return to the promotion after a four absence. At MWF's "Night of Champions" that summer, it was announced by MWF President Johnny Fabulous that the MWF Tag Team Championship would be defended by any two members of The Uprising since the Canadian Superstars had failed to appear to at the event. The team had consistently failed to appear for scheduled title defenses to avoid losing their belts. In a surprise move, J-Busta fired his tag team partner Dave Cole from The Uprising and chose DellaGatta as Cole's replacement. They ended up losing the tag titles to Beau Douglas and Jackson Blue later that night.

DellaGatta wrestled for other promotions during this time. On June 9, he headlined a major show in Springvale, Maine, for NWA Pro Wrestling also featuring NWA Television Champion Judas Young, NWA Tag Team Champions The Playa's Club, Bobby Robinson, Robbie Ellis, Mr. Hughes, and reality tv star Sammy Makua from ABC's from Fat March. He also wrestled on a major interpromotional event hosted by Alliance Championship Wrestling, "Benefit for Brandon", in Fall River, Massachusetts, along with performers from Big Time Wrestling, Eastern Pro Wrestling, Eastern Wrestling Alliance, Front Row Wrestling, New England Championship Wrestling, No Limit Pro Wrestling, Northeast Championship Wrestling, Real Deal Wrestling, Showcase Pro Wrestling, and Power & Glory Wrestling. On the show, he lost to "Narcisstic" Nicholas Night in a match for the SPW Heavyweight Championship. A second appearance for NWA Pro saw DellaGatta lose to Larry Huntley in Livermore, Maine, on August 15. A few weeks later in the North Atlantic Wrestling Association, he also lost to North Atlantic Television Champion Sammy Makua on the weekend of September 5–6, 2008.

Back in the MWF, he and The Uprising attacked newcomer Scott Reed on the September edition of MWF Ultra, however, Reed gained his revenge by defeating DellaGatta at "Soul Survivor V" on November 12, 2008. He and Jimmy Jact Ca$h were both eventually released from The Uprising, and their MWF contracts, by John Bradshaw Layfield following a meeting with the MWF Board of Directors the following spring.

=== NWA On Fire (2008–2009) ===
DellaGatta joined Maine's NWA On Fire in late 2008. He made one of his first appearances on the October 18th edition of "NWA On Fire TV" as a guest on "Tommy's Corner" with Tommy Savoldi. In his first six months with the promotion, he appeared against many of the region's top stars on its weekly television series including Rick Fuller, Gino Martino, Scotty Vegas, and "Mr 450" Jesus Perez; he also teamed with JT Hoodlum and Alexxus in a mixed tag team match against Chase Delmonte and Naughty Adrianna. DellaGatta had one or two encounters with NWA On Fire Tag Team Champions The Latin Hit Squad (Chico and Nico) as well. On April 18, he joined Sonny Roselli and Gary Wentzell in a 6-man tag team match to defeat Larry Huntly and The Latin Hit Squad in Mexico, Maine. DellaGatta and Jesus Perez challenged The Latin Hit Squad (Chico and Nico) for the NWA On Fire Tag Team Championship. In singles competition, he faced Lance Cade and NWA On Fire Heavyweight Champion "Golden Boy" Bobby Robinson in August, and "The Maine Mauler" Cousin Larry in September.

=== New England Championship Wrestling (2008–2010) ===
Prior leaving the MWF, DellaGatta also began wrestling for New England Championship Wrestling. It was there that he formed the "Crown Jewels" with Darling Damon, a "flamboyant" pair in the style of the Christopher Street Connection or the WWE's Billy and Chuck. They were originally managed by Brian Cairo and later replaced with "Mr. Fabulous" Tony Ulysses. The team made their debut at "Red, White, & Bruised" in Quincy, Massachusetts, where they lost to Team Nightmare (Evan Siks and Nick Steel). The two next appeared at NECW's 8th anniversary show "Birthday Bash 8: Lager Than Life!" where they were part of a special 8-man survival match with Ryan Matthews and "The Talent" T.J. Richter against Team Nightmare (Evan Siks, Nick Steel, Lil' Nicky Amaral and Frankie Vain). Their team lost the match, however, DellaGatta and Damon began attacking Nick Steel afterwards. When Evan Siks returned to the ring to save his partner, Darling Damon sprayed Evan Siks in the eyes with perfume causing a kayfabe injury.

Their attack started a six-month feud between the two teams. On September 20, the two teams met in a Triple Threat match with NECW Tag Team Champions PRIDE (Dan Freitas & Brian Nunes) at "Autumn Unleashed". On November 29, 2008, The Crown Jewels won via forfeit at "Double Intensity" when Chase Del Monte and Fred Curry, Jr. failed to appear at the referee's ten count; they subsequently faced Team Nightmare in a match which ended in a double-disqualification. DellaGatta then wrestled Evan Siks in a singles match at NECW's January 10 show "Snowbrawl" to decide the guest referee for their team's grudge match at the next supercard, a match won by "Bad Boy Jason". DellaGatta's original opponent was Nick Steel but was unable to appear at the show when someone slashed the tires of his car and Evan Siks took his place.

The Crown Jewels-Team Nightmare feud came to an end at "GENESIS 8: Measure for Measure". Prior to their match, DellaGatta and Damon announced that they had offered each member of Team Nightmare $5000 to sell out their partner and leave NECW. Nick Steel accepted their offer and walked out on Evan Siks, leaving him alone in a handicap match. In addition, The Crown Jewels introduced their new stylist and lifestyle consultant "Mr. Fabulous" Tony Ulysses, one of the most controversial stars of Killer Kowalski's All Star Wrestling during the 1980s. Due to DellaGatta's victory over Siks at the last show, they had the option of choosing Ulysses to referee the match. The match ended with DellaGatta pinning Siks following a "low blow" from Tony Ulysses before making the pinfall. When Siks recovered, he removed his wrestling boots and left the ring traditionally signifying that a wrestler had fought his last match.

On March 21, 2009, The Crown Jewels defeated PRIDE (Dan Freitas and Brian Nunes) at "March Badness" for the NECW Tag Team Championship. They successfully defended the titles against Davey Loomis and Alex Payne at July 11's "Red, White & Bruised". A rematch at "Birthday Bash 9: Rage in a Cage" saw The Crown Jewels disqualified against Loomis and Payne, but remained champions. They also successfully defended the titles against Ryan Bisbal and Don Vega at NECW's "Tag Team Classic", who had won a one-night tag team tournament to face the tag team champions, on September 19. During the match, Darling distracted their opponents by attempting to abduct their valet Ivy and allowed DellaGata to score the winning pinfall over Vega.

The 2-day "Autumn Unleashed" show on October 23–24 saw The Crown Jewels on the run from their rivals; on the first night in Somerset, they lost to Davey Loomis and Alex Payne via countout and, in a non-title match, to Don Vega and Ryan Bisbal in Quincy. The Crown Jewels attacked Vega and Bisbal after the match but were run off by a mysterious masked man who revealed himself as Jose Perez.

They briefly lost the titles to Rican Havoc (Don Vega and Jose Perez) on November 28, 2009, but were returned to them due to a contractual dispute. The Crown Jewels managed to keep the titles from Rican Havoc for another five months, such as incurring a disqualification loss at February 27's "GENESIS 9" to retain the belts, but ended up losing the belts to them in Quincy on May 15, 2010. A year later, The Crown Jewels returned to NECW to perform for a benefit show at Carver High School. The event was to raise money for a 4-year-old boy suffering from a rare form of brain cancer.

=== NWA On Fire (2010) ===
At NWA On Fire's "Valentines Day Brawl", DellaGatta led Josef Von Scmidt and "Cold Hearted Playa" Danny Demanto against Nunzio, Justin Corino, and "Heart Attack" Tommy Mack in South Windsor, Connecticut. A month later, he headlined Showcase Pro Wrestling's 4-year anniversary show in South Attleboro, Massachusetts wrestling Nicholas Night for the promotion's heavyweight title. On April 18, 2010, he attended the 5th annual New England Pro Wrestling Hall of Fame to formerly induct Bull Montana.

On May 14, 2010, The Crown Jewels took part in an NWA On Fire benefit show for Lisbon High School where they defeated NWA On Fire Tag Team Champions The Samoan Warriors (Makua and Fallah) for the titles. Their first title successful title defense was on NWA On Fire TV against Makua and Chico, one half of the Samoan Warriors and Latin Hit Squad respectively. They eventually lost the tag titles to Matt Taven and Julian Starr in Springvale, Maine, on August 10, 2010.

=== Touring Canada with the "Sea Side Slam Tour" (2010) ===
In the summer of 2010, DellaGatta was among the wrestling stars from five countries invited to take part in MainStream Wrestling Entertainment's 10th Anniversary Tour of the Maritimes visiting 13 cities in Newfoundland and Labrador over a seven-week period.

=== Independent circuit (2011) ===
DellaGatta also spent time with Showcase Pro Wrestling based in Woonsocket, Rhode Island. On August 15, he wrestled "The Prodigal Child with the Southern Smile" Cargill Vinton to a 15 min. time-limit draw at the SPW Arena. During its "Autumn Annihilation Tour", co-promoted by SPW and WVBF 1530, he wrestled "Mr. Nice" Mike Nice for the SPW Heavyweight Championship in Taunton, Massachusetts. He returned for an October 15 show at the SPW Arena to face Andy "Spicolli" Mackenzie. He was also booked to wrestle a benefit show for retired wrestler Maxx Lethal, whose wife suffers from liver problems, prior to its sudden cancellation by the board of selectmen of Framingham, Massachusetts.

That same year, DellaGatta became involved with Victory Championship Wrestling, which promotes wrestling events with DellaGatta's Bell Time Club. It is one of several smaller promotions in the Greater Boston Area which became part of the Century Wrestling Alliance when it was revived as a sort of governing body similar to the National Wrestling Alliance. On November 19, 2011, DellaGatta headlined the 12th Annual Tony Rumble Memorial Show in Everett, under the VCW banner, challenging Steve Beck for the VCW Heavyweight Championship.

=== New England Championship Wrestling (2011–) ===
On December 16, 2011, DellaGatta made a surprise return to New England Championship Wrestling for its year-end supercard "The Fight Before Christmas" at the Millerville Men's Club in Blackstone, Massachusetts. It was at the event that he was attacked by "The Statement" Elia Markopoulos, a third member of The Crown Jewels, while arguing with former manager Tony Ulysses during a backstage promo. Three days later, he and Doink the Clown headlined a wrestling event promoted by retired wrestler Cameron Mathews in Fairfield, Massachusetts.

He was scheduled to face Markopoulos and a mystery partner, managed by "Mr. Fabulous" Tony Ulysses, in a tag team match with Tank The Tank in the main event for NECW's "Double Intensity" on May 18, 2012.

== Bell Time Club ==
The Bell Time Club is professional wrestling training facility and social club in Everett, Massachusetts. Modeled after the Cauliflower Alley Club, it is a private club which accepts members on an invitation-only basis. Club members, particularly wrestling fans, have access to its facilities depending on the level of membership. The idea was conceived by Jason DellaGatta and other Boston-area wrestlers as a local wrestling "hangout" for pro wrestlers and wrestling fans alike. It is the first such club opened to members of the general public.

The club was officially established on February 8, 2010, and held a free exhibition show at the Everett Rec Center a few weeks later. It has since run live wrestling events with Victory Championship Wrestling, one of several smaller independent groups in the Greater Boston area associated with the Century Wrestling Alliance. The club was the subject of an article by the Malden Observer shortly after its opening. On April 10, 2010, DellaGatta was a guest on "On the Spot", a local talk show aired in his hometown of Malden, during which he talked about his athletic and pro wrestling career as well as promoting the Bell Time Club. He also discussed plans to host a bi-monthly talk show of his own, "The Rumble Seat", and speculated on developing an undercover "whistleblowing" tv series to expose local political corruption. The Bell Time Club in Everett, MA would close its doors in late 2012. Jason Rumble and Victory Championship Wrestling subsequently moved the BTC training facility to 40 Broadway in Wakefield, MA. Today that is where they hold many of their shows.

== Championships and accomplishments ==
=== Football ===
- New England Football League
  - NEFL All-Pro player (2 times)
  - Special teams player of the Year (2000)

=== Professional wrestling ===
- National Wrestling Alliance
  - NWA World Junior Heavyweight Championship (3 times)
- NWA New England
  - NWA New England Heavyweight Championship (3 times)
  - NWA New England Junior Heavyweight Championship (5 times)
  - NWA New England X Division Championship (1 time)
  - NWA New England Tag Team Championship (2 times) – with Slyck Wagner Brown and Luis Ortiz
  - Tony Rumble Memorial Battle Royal winner (2005)
- NWA On Fire
  - NWA On Fire Tag Team Championship (2 times) – with Darling Damon
- New England Championship Wrestling
  - NECW Tag Team Championship (2 times) – with Darling Damon
- New England Pro Wrestling Hall of Fame
  - Class of 2014
- New Wrestling Horizons
  - NWH Tag Team Championship (1 time) – with Mark Moment
- Pro Wrestling Illustrated
  - PWI ranked him #314 of the top 500 singles wrestlers in the PWI 500 in 2005
  - PWI ranked him #281 of the top 500 singles wrestlers in the PWI 500 in 2004
  - PWI ranked him #305 of the top 500 singles wrestlers in the PWI 500 in 2003
  - PWI ranked him #296 of the top 500 singles wrestlers in the PWI 500 in 2002
  - PWI ranked him #282 of the top 500 singles wrestlers in the PWI 500 in 2001
- UFO Wrestling
  - UFO United States Championship (1 time)
- Victory Championship Wrestling
  - VCW Heavyweight Championship (1 time)
  - VCW Tag Team Championship (1 time) – with Mark Anthony
