= The Pink Assassin =

American professional wrestler

Personal information
- Born: Robert Shoup Boston, Massachusetts, U.S.

Professional wrestling career
- Ring name(s): The Pink Assassin; Bob Van Winkle; Rob Van Winkle; The Wrestling School Dropout
- Billed height: 6 ft 0 in (1.83 m)
- Billed weight: 231 lb (105 kg)
- Billed from: Fire Island, New York
- Debut: 1984
- Retired: 2011

Robert "Bob" Shoup, better known by his ring name The Pink Assassin, is an American retired professional wrestler and manager. He was best known for his time in International Championship Wrestling where he feuded with "Jumping" Joe Savoldi and Robbie Ellis over the ICW Junior Heavyweight Championship during the 1980s.

Shoup later moved on to the Century Wrestling Alliance where he became one of the promotion's biggest stars. During his tenure with the company, he won the CWA Cruiserweight Championship two times. After his retirement in 2001, Shoup managed a number of wrestlers on the Northeastern independent circuit including, most notably, Ox Baker's Army in the Millennium Wrestling Federation. From 2006 to 2008, he appeared at several charity wrestling shows for Power League Wrestling.

== Professional wrestling career ==
=== Early career (1984–1988) ===
Shoup made his pro debut in 1984. He spent the first few years wrestling as Bob Van Winkle or Rob Van Winkle. In June 1984, Shoup was defeated by Len Kruger in a tournament final for the New England Wrestling Alliance's light heavyweight championship in Thomaston, Maine. Within two years, Shoup was working as a preliminary wrestler for the World Wrestling Federation. He teamed with Jim Powers against Big John Studd and Hercules (with Bobby Heenan and Freddie Blassie) on the May 12th edition of WWF Championship Wrestling.

=== International Championship Wrestling (1989–1995) ===
In 1989, Shoup began working for the Savoldi family's International Championship Wrestling in Boston, Massachusetts. He initially wrestled as The Wrestling School Dropout, a "gimmick" created by then IWCCW booker Paul Heyman, before adopting his more familiar in-ring character The Pink Assassin. A flamboyant masked wrestler with effeminate mannerisms and outlandish ring attire, he established himself as one of ICW's top heel performers. The Pink Assassin quickly rose to the top of the promotion's light heavyweight division battling "Jumping" Joe Savoldi and Robbie Ellis for the ICW Junior Heavyweight Championship during the mid-to late 1980s. Ellis regards The Pink Assassin as one of the biggest rivals of his career. He also antagonized WWF Hall of Famer Ivan Putski before departing from the company.

=== Century Wrestling Alliance (1995–2001) ===
Shoup was one of many IWCCW stars to leave the promotion in the mid-1990s in favor of Tony Rumble's Century Wrestling Alliance. In the fall of 1995, Shoup began feuding with El Marcarado over the CWA Cruiserweight Championship. He defeated El Marcarado for the title in Provincetown, Massachusetts on December 23, 1995. Shoup dropped the title to El Marcarado in Manchester, New Hampshire on March 8, 1996. On the March 30th edition of CWA March Madness, The Pink Assassin and The Lano Brothers (Dick and Mike Lano) defeated El Mascarado, Falcon and Omega in a six-man tag team match. On April 6, he managed to defeat El Mascarado via disqualification at the CWA Arena in Salisbury, Massachusetts. As the titles could only change hands via pinfall of submission, his opponent retained the championship. The Pink Assassin lost to Vic Steamboat in a match for the CWA Television Championship a week later. On July 20, The Pink Assassin scored a victory over Metal Maniac in Gloucester, Massachusetts. His feud with El Mascarado continued into the summer and fall of 1996. He regained the CWA Cruiserweight Championship in Rutland, Vermont on November 26, 1996. His remained champion for over two months before losing the title back to El Marcarado in Chelsea, Massachusetts on January 31, 1997. On October 4, 1997, The Pink Assassin and Curtis Slamdawg wrestled Jay Jaillette and The Mercenary at The Sports Palace in New Britain, Connecticut. On January 24, 1998, The Pink Assassin lost to Mike Hollow in Ridgefield, Connecticut. He began transitioning as a manager after the CWA joined the NWA. His most notable charge was Gino Martino who he "tamed" and brought to the ring in a dog collar. The Pink Assassin remained with the promotion until his retirement in 2001.

=== Millennium Wrestling Federation (2006) ===
After a five-year absence, The Pink Assassin came out of retirement to co-manage Ox Baker's Army in the Millennium Wrestling Federation. The masked wrestler made his televised debut on the March 4, 2006 episode of MWF Ultra where was introduced by Baker as the stable's "Army General". The Pink Assassin was put in charge of the faction when Ox Baker was unable to attend MFW events. Within a month of his leadership, stable member The Outpatient was suspended by the promotion after going on a tirade at a MWF Ultra TV taping; the incident stemmed from being pinned by newcomer "Black Lotus" Matt Ledge in his debut match. Later on, The Pink Assassin managed The Vachon Brothers (Pierre "The Beast" Vachon and Damien "The Pitbull" Vachon) in their match against MWF Tag Team Champions Todd Hanson and Beau Douglas. The Vachons came close to winning the titles but outside interference from Johnny Fabulous allowed the champions to escape with the belts.

=== Power League Wrestling (2006–2008, 2011) ===
At the end of the year, The Pink Assassin began appearing for charity wrestling events with Power League Wrestling based in Pawtucket, Rhode Island. On December 12, 2006, The Pink Assassin came out of retirement for Power House Brawl 2006 to wrestle fellow IWCCW alumni Gary Apollo at West Warwick High School. He also joined the 2007 Great Outdoors Tour the following summer. On August 25, The Pink Assassin was defeated by "Defenseman" Derek Molhan in Pawtucket. A month later, The Pink Assassin returned to the city where he and Iraqnid lost to Amazin Jay and Shane Simons. At Power Fest 2008, The Pink Assassin joined Maniacal Mark and Mr. Wrestling IV in a losing effort against Amazin Jay, Derek Molhan and Gary Apollo in West Warwick, Rhode Island. On June 1, The Pink Assassin lost to Doug Sommers at Nathanael Greene Elementary School in Pawtucket, RI. On August 2, 2008, The Pink Assassin and Mr. Wrestling VI beat Amazin Jay and Doug Summers via disqualification in Valley Falls, Rhode Island. He unsuccessfully challenged Derek Molhan for the PLW New England Championship a week later at Diamond Hill Park in Valley Falls. A week later The Pink Assassin was involved in a 9-man Olympic battle royal also involving Amazin Jay, Derek Molhan, Evan Siks, Gary Apollo, Matt Storm, Nicholas Night, Shane Simons, and Stuart The Dollmaker. In September, he was among the wrestlers in attendance at the funeral of Killer Kowalski in Malden, Massachusetts. The Pink Assassin returned to PLW three years later for the 2011 Great Outdoors Tour. On September 24, 2011, he was defeated by Sgt. Muldoon at Lees Pond Park in South Attleboro, Massachusetts.

== Championships and accomplishments ==
- Century Wrestling Alliance
  - CWA Cruiserweight Championship (2 times)
- Pro Wrestling Illustrated
  - PWI ranked The Pink Assassin # 279 of the 500 best singles wrestlers of the PWI 500 in 1996
  - PWI ranked The Pink Assassin # 342 of the 500 best singles wrestlers of the PWI 500 in 1997
