= Daniel Quirk =

American professional wrestler (1982–2005)

Dan Quirk

Personal information
- Born: Daniel Michael Quirk; July 19, 1982 Bridgeport, Connecticut, U.S.
- Died: May 28, 2005 (aged 22) Taunton, Massachusetts
- Website: WrestlingSpider.com at the Wayback Machine (archived March 29, 2007)

Professional wrestling career
- Ring names: Spider; Stuart
- Billed height: 6 ft 0 in (1.83 m)
- Billed weight: 151 lb (68 kg)
- Trained by: John Brooks; Bert Centano
- Debut: July 21, 2002 vs. Beau Douglas

Daniel Michael Quirk (July 19, 1982 – May 28, 2005) was an American professional wrestler, known by his ring name Spider, who competed in several Northeastern and Mid-Atlantic independent promotions including Assault Championship Wrestling, Chikara, the Millennium Wrestling Federation, the National Wrestling Alliance, World Wrestling Alliance and World Xtreme Wrestling.

One of the youngest-ever NWA New England Junior Heavyweight Champions, he faced some of the top light heavyweights in the Northeast including longtime friend and trainer John Brooks, Jason Rumble, Eddie Edwards, Mikey Whipwreck, and Gran Akuma. In 2004, he and Akuma met in the opening round of Chikara's Young Lions Cup tournament.

Quirk's ring death in 2005 was the first death to occur on the independent circuit as the result of an in-ring accident, and concern was voiced by many in the professional wrestling industry including Al Snow, Percy Pringle, and Dan Mirade over negligence and regulation of independent wrestling in the United States.

== Career ==
=== Early life and career ===
Daniel Quirk was born to Michael and Patricia Quirk in Bridgeport, Connecticut, and grew up in Shelton, Connecticut. According to Quirk, he initially became interested in wrestling when a friend showed him action figures of Demolition in second grade. He began watching the World Wrestling Federation around 1990. Bret Hart, Mr. Perfect and The Rockers (Marty Jannetty and Shawn Michaels) would later influence his ring style. He was involved in "backyard wrestling" with his brothers and friends as a teenager and, in early 2002, Quirk began training under John Brooks and Bert Centano at the USA Pro Wrestling School in West Haven, Connecticut. He also attended clinics held by Christopher Daniels, Mike Quackenbush and Tom Prichard.

Quirk began appearing in local wrestling shows as Stuart the manager of the Scottish Gigolo. On July 21, 2002, Quirk made his professional debut against Beau Douglas in a gauntlet match for Jason Knight's Assault Championship Wrestling. A month later, he appeared on another gauntlet match for ACW teaming with trainer John Brooks in a tag team match against Bulldog & Shabba on August 24. He also lost a match to the Scottish Gigolo in Worcester, Massachusetts, at the end of the month. He spent much his early career on the road with frequent rival and a later personal friend, Nocturne.

=== Independent circuit ===
Later that year, he made his first appearance for the New Age Wrestling Federation when he defeated White Blaze and later participated in a battle royal on October 20.

During the next year, he became a regular on the independent circuit. He feuded with Mark Gore over the NAWF Junior Heavyweight Championship and eventually defeated him for the title in a ladder match on April 27, 2003. In May, for South Coast Championship Wrestling, Quirk lost a five-way match for the SCCW Lightweight title against Stevie Sky, Derrick Destiny, The Kreeper and Kid Capri on May 30. Entering a championship tournament for the MWF Heavyweight Championship the next night, he was eliminated by John Brooks.

On July 26, he won his first major title when he and Captain Charisma defeated NWA New England Junior Heavyweight Champion Jason Rumble and Paulie Gilmore in a tag team match. As a result of pre-match stipulations ordered by NWA Commissioner Marc Greene, both Quirk and Captain Charisma were named co-champions. Although the two defended the title in a handicap match against Rumble on September 20, the title was vacated and declared inactive within another month.

Successfully defending his NAWF title in a three-way match against Nocturne and Genesis, he lost to Genesis in a non-title match on September 6. The next night, he also lost to Eddie Edwards for the ACW Junior Heavyweight Championship. On October 5, he wrestled two matches in one night at an MWF show, losing to Mighty Mini, Eddie Edwards and participating in a battle royal.

On February 29, 2004, Quirk teamed with UltraMantis and Mister Zero to defeat Nocturne, Jigsaw and Rorschach at an LXW show. Feuding with Gran Akuma over the NAWF Junior Heavyweight Championship, he defeated him for the title on April 4. He held the title for two months before losing the title back to Akuma. In May, Quirk defeated Dan Barry in a ladder match. On July 10, 2004, he also lost to Gran Akuma in the opening rounds of Chikara's Young Lions Cup tournament. He and Dave Cole were also given a title shot against UCW Tag Team Champions The Millennium Killaz later that month, but failed to defeat them.

Quirk spent the rest of the year in Connecticut Championship Wrestling, East Coast Pro Wrestling and World Xtreme Wrestling. On September 10, he lost to Low Ryda in a match for the WXW Cruiserweight Championship. He also appeared in Assault Championship Wrestling, Powerhouse Wrestling and Ultimate Championship Wrestling during early 2005.

== Death ==
Dan Quirk died after suffering fatal injuries at an Ultimate Championship Wrestling event in Taunton, Massachusetts. He attempted a moonsault, but was not caught by his opponent, causing him to strike the floor head-first. With blood visible on the floor, the match was stopped. An ambulance was called, but all efforts to revive Quirk were unsuccessful. According to eyewitnesses, no mats had been provided outside the ring and that may have been the deciding factor resulting in his fatal injuries.

=== Aftermath ===
In the days following his death, it was announced on his former website that the Daniel Michael Quirk Memorial Scholarship Fund would be set up in his memory. His father, Mike Quirk, said that the fund would be available for a graduating senior from Shelton High School majoring in graphic arts and communications. Quirk had studied graphic design at Northeastern University and the University of New Haven and later designed websites for various independent wrestlers and promotions in addition to being the webmaster of NAWF's official website.

On June 11, 2005, Connecticut Championship Wrestling dedicated its WrestleJam 2 supercard to Quirk's memory. Prior to the show, a special ceremony was held at the ACES Collaborative Alternative Magnet School for Leadership in Northford, Connecticut, while promoter Joe LaChance and Bulldog Blanski both gave a speech to the crowd. The entire CCW roster, including Matt Hardy, was present during the ceremony. Quirk's death, according to Blanski, prompted he and Mike Milano to contact Jason Knight whom they had not spoken to since leaving Assault Championship Wrestling to form their own promotion. Among the wrestlers who headlined the event included April Hunter, Ariel, Cindy Rogers, Scotty Charisma, Rob Eckos, Jay Lethal, Slyck Wagner Brown, The Logan Brothers (Bryan and Matt), The Outkast Killaz (Diablo Santiago and Oman Tortuga), and All Money Is Legal (K-Pusha and K-Murda). The main event featured a tribute ten man tag match featuring the team of Nocturne, Ron Zombie, Mark Gore, Bulldog Blanski and Jose Perez against the Iron Eagle, Dave Cole, Anthony Michaels, J Busta and Tim Kilgore. Both Monsta Mack and Low Ki made a surprise appearance on the show. John Brooks, also made an appearance at the event alongside Matt Hardy.

== Championships and accomplishments ==
- New Age Wrestling Federation
  - NAWF Junior Heavyweight Championship (1 time)
- NWA New England
  - NWA New England Junior Heavyweight Championship (1 time)

== See also ==
- List of premature professional wrestling deaths
