= Century Wrestling Alliance =

American wrestling promotion

- Acronym: CWA
- Founded: 1989
- Defunct: 2007
- Style: American Wrestling
- Headquarters: Boston, Massachusetts, United States
- Founder: Tony Rumble
- Owner(s): Tony Rumble (1989–1999); Ellen Magliaro (1989–present); Chad Merchant (2004–2006); Chad Peters (2004–2006)
- Sister: New World Wrestling (2005); NWA Addicted (2006)
- Formerly: Century Wrestling Alliance (1989–1997); NWA Cold Front/NWA New England (1997–2007)
- Website: NWAColdFront.com

The Century Wrestling Alliance, formerly known as NWA Cold Front and NWA New England, was a New England–based American independent wrestling promotion located in Boston, Massachusetts. It was founded by Tony Rumble in 1989, a retired wrestler and manager in International World Class Championship Wrestling, and included much of its roster prior to and following its close during the early 1990s. The promotion eventually replaced IWCCW as the dominant independent promotion in the Greater Boston area and, in 1997, became an affiliated territory of the National Wrestling Alliance.

Among the wrestlers who followed Rumble to the CWA included The Pink Assassin, "Surfer" Ray Odyssey, Vic Steamboat and "Mr. USA" Tony Atlas. As with IWCCW, several future stars of Extreme Championship Wrestling spent their early careers in the promotion including Tommy Dreamer, The Tazmaniac and The Public Enemy (Rocco Rock and Johnny Grunge) as well as established Northeastern independent wrestlers such as Amanda Storm, April Hunter, LuFisto, Alex Arion, Juggernaut, Metal Maniac, Al Snow, Tom Brandi, Handsome Johnny, Dan Quirk, Rick Fuller, Wagner Brown, The Extremists (Ace Darling & Devon Storm) and The Brotherhood (Erich Sbraccia and Knuckles Nelson). Sbraccia and Nelson later won the NWA World Tag Team Championship, as well as the NWA New England titles, while with the promotion.

World Championship Wrestling's Harley Race, Barry Windham, Kevin Sullivan, The Rock 'n' Roll Express (Ricky Morton and Robert Gibson) and the World Wrestling Federation's Steve Keirn (wrestling as Doink the Clown), Jake "the Snake" Roberts, Jimmy Snuka, King Kong Bundy, The Honky Tonk Man and The Iron Sheik also made frequent appearances.

== History ==
=== Early history (1989–1992) ===
In 1989, veteran wrestler and longtime on-air IWCCW personality Tony Rumble opened a small wrestling promotion, the Century Wrestling Alliance, with his wife Ellen Magliaro. Many of its stars chose to leave the Savoldi's for his new promotion including The Pink Assassin, "Surfer" Ray Odyssey, Vic Steamboat and "Mr. USA" Tony Atlas, then IWCCW Heavyweight Champion. As the IWCCW declined during the early 1990s, Rumble was able build up the CWA and eventually succeeded the former as the dominant independent promotion in the Greater Boston area. With help from personal friends such as World Wrestling Federation manager Jim Cornette and World Championship Wrestling booker Kevin Sullivan, he was able to bring in a number of wrestlers from both organizations throughout the decade. Rumble also developed a collection of local wrestlers as unique or entertaining "gimmick workers", referring to them as his personal "whack pack". He also displayed an ability to pick up "sold shows", events in which the promotion is hired by a school or private organization, and then continuously promote upcoming events from these shows.

=== Century Wrestling Alliance (1992–1997) ===
Within a few years, Rumble had carved out a sizable territory and was promoting shows throughout New England. While Rumble had already been a highly recognizable personality from his years in IWCCW, he also started a Public-access television show, Mass Madness, produced by Pat Doyle. The series had fairly high quality production and featured not only televised wrestling events but also comedic "wrap-around segments". One of these segments, "Tony Rumble's Mike Lano Chronicles", featured a continuing series of matches and skits of a wrestler impersonating wrestling "dirt sheet" writer Dr. Mike Lano. He was a self-claimed NWA World Heavyweight Champion but that his belt "was upstairs in the penthouse getting buffed by the Lano-ettes". The skits followed Lano as he attempted to convince Jim Cornette to become his manager. When Lano finally tracks down Cornette, who is seen stealing crackers from a hotel kitchen, he is challenged to a wrestling trivia duel. Following this, the skit ends with Lano going upstairs to the penthouse where he is attacked by Mae Young and the Fabulous Moolah.

The promotion was mostly dominated by ex-IWCCW stars, and on occasion former WCW and WWF veterans, during its early years. Between 1993 and 1995, the CWA Heavyweight Championship was traded between The Iron Sheik, Vic Steamboat, Tony Atlas and Kevin Sullivan. Similarly, the CWA Light Heavyweight Championship was dominated by Ray Odyssey and The Pink Assassin, and Double Trouble (Tony & Val Puccio) were the first tag team champions, followed by Ray Odyssey and Vic Steamboat. Rumble himself would hold the CWA New England Heavyweight Championship a record 3-times during a five-year period before his wife, and then CWA President, stripped him of the title when the promotion joined the National Wrestling Alliance.

Rumble, having seen them perform in IWCCW, had also used future Extreme Championship Wrestling stars The Tazmaniac and Tommy Dreamer. In fact, Dreamer became the promotion's first heavyweight champion when he defeated Tony Atlas in a tournament final in Wallingford, Connecticut on 5 November 1992. On 3 January 1993, The Tazmaniac became the first CWA Light Heavyweight Champion defeating Flexx Wheeler in a tournament final in Windsor Locks, Connecticut and, three years later, The Public Enemy (Rocco Rock & Johnny Grunge) won the CWA Tag Team Championship. They would eventually lose the titles to The Extremists (Ace Darling & Devon Storm) in Worcester, Massachusetts on 24 July 1996.

=== Association with Paul Heyman and ECW (1997–1998) ===
It was around this time that Rumble began working with then ECW promoter Paul Heyman and Sheldon Goldberg, then editor of the Mat Marketplace newsletter, collaborated on a working agreement with Michinoku Pro Wrestling to bring its stars to perform in the United States. In February 1997, the groups efforts paid off when Michinoku owner and main star, The Great Sasuke, brought a group of wrestlers with him to Boston where they appeared in exhibition matches at an ECW television taping and a house show for the CWA. The latter show was headlined by Kevin Sullivan, still a booker at WCW, and had held the heavyweight title for the past two years. He would eventually be stripped of the title after losing a Loser-Must-Retire match against Chris Benoit on 14 July 1997.

Rumble was so impressed by Goldberg that he offered him a position as the official CWA Commissioner. Goldberg oversaw merchandise sales at house shows, but also ran the promotion's website, wrote and designed arena programs, posters and tickets. Sheldon was very well-connected due to his newsletter and his position on the Board of Directors of the Cauliflower Alley Club. He proved a valuable addition to the company and was especially involved in the promotion's association with the NWA. Sheldon would later become close friends with its president Howard Brody. Other important members were Patrick Doyle, television producer of Mass Madness, and Boston radio personality Jeff Katz. The promotion was also featured in Ringside Wrestling.

=== NWA New England (1998–1999) ===
NWA New England logo, used from 1998 to 2006

On 24 January 1998, the Century Wrestling Alliance became an official affiliate for National Wrestling Alliance and renamed NWA New England, as was its titles. The secondary CWA New England title, previously held by Tony Rumble, would be merged with the main CWA Heavyweight title to create a new NWA New England Heavyweight Championship. The Light Heavyweight title was renamed as an NWA cruiserweight championship. In addition, several new titles were introduced including the Brass Knuckles and Women's titles. Tournaments were held for several of these new titles. On 17 January 1998, Erich Sbraccia defeated Vic Steamboat to win the NWA New England Heavyweight title in Southbridge, Massachusetts. Violet Flame defeated Amanda Storm for the women's title in Bridgeport, Connecticut on 15 October 1999, and Mike Johnson defeated Trooper Gilmore for the brass knuckles title in Somerville, Massachusetts on 22 June 2000. Although the promotion was primarily known as NWA New England, or sometimes NWA Cold Front, it ran under its original name when holding events outside New England itself such as an 25 April house show in Ogdensburg, New York. This was partly due to contractual obligations agreed to with the NWA and did not affect its regular shows elsewhere in New England.

NWA New England was present at the NWA 50th Anniversary Show, held at the Cherry Hill Hilton's "Crystal Ballroom" in Cherry Hill, New Jersey, on 24 October 1998. The first match was a three-way dance between Tre, Ray Odyssey and The Inferno Kid for the NWA New England Junior Heavyweight Championship which lasted a little over 12 minutes and ended by count-out, allowing Tre to retain the title. The second match, part of the undercard, saw The Brotherhood (Erich Sbraccia & Knuckles Nelson) defeat NWA World Tag Team Champions NWA All-Star's The Border Patrol (Agent Gunn and Agent Maxx) in an interpromotional four corners match with NWA Southwest's Team Extreme (Kit Carson and Khris Germany) and special guests Tully Blanchard and Dr. Tom Prichard. Barry Windham was originally scheduled to team with Blanchard but was unable to attend. Rumble had been the manager and cornerman for both events.

The Brotherhood continued to defend the World titles, as well as the NWA New England versions, and included other members, most notably Dukes Dalton and Rick Fuller, who substituted for Sbraccia when he was injured. Fuller and Knuckles Nelson eventually lost the titles to The Public Enemy at a house show in Bolton, Massachusetts on 17 June 1999. Also on the card were Wagner Brown and King Kong Bundy. Two days later, Knuckles Nelson and Dukes Dalton regained titles from The Public Enemy in Dorchester, Massachusetts. Jeff Mangles also defeated Jay Jaillet to win the NWA New England Junior Heavyweight title. Earlier that year, the promotion was profiled by the ESPN series Outside the Lines.

On 2 October, NWA New England hosted an NWA World Heavyweight title defense between Gary Steele and challenger Naoya Ogawa at a local high school in Thomaston, Connecticut, promoted by Ellen Magliaro. Tony Rumble had volunteered to manage Gary Steele but turned on him during the match, hitting Steele with his helmet, and allowing Ogawa to win the match with a choke-hold and regain the title. Ogawa, as well as Steele, were upset by his interference. A "visually upset" Ogawa challenged Rumble claiming he "didn't need his help" to win back the title. Steele also threatened Rumble in a post-match interview, "promising to return to New England in the near future for revenge".

=== Death of Tony Rumble and aftermath (1999–2000) ===
During 1999, Mass Madness was eventually shown on regular broadcast television via independent UHF television station WNDS, out of Derry, New Hampshire. The show changed its format and, after 16 weeks, the station wanted to change the arraignment and be paid in order to air the program. A local car dealership, Atlantic Toyota, initially agreed to sponsor the show but pulled out at the last minute. Several weeks later, on 13 November 1999, Tony Rumble died of a massive heart attack. His wife Ellen took over the promotion, as well as his seat on the NWA Board of Directors, choosing to continue running NWA New England.

Rumble's death greatly disrupted the independent wrestling scene in New England. Though a longtime personality and having some limited promoting experience, Ellen Magliaro attempted to hire others to take on Rumble's role as head promoter and booker. None were able to recreate Rumble's success however and, within six months of his death, business had declined significantly. Sheldon Goldberg resigned from the promotion after a few months and six months after his death, Goldberg resigned his position with the company to start his own promotion, New England Championship Wrestling. Magliaro finally turned the promotion over to Jason Dellagatta, an NWA New England wrestler known as Jason Rage, and helped develop his character "Boston Bad Boy" Jason Rumble, the kayfabe son of Tony. Although the promotion stabilized for a time, Dellagatta was never able to match the success that Tony Rumble had with the promotion. His inexperience, both as a wrestler and businessman hindered Dellagatta's efforts as well increased competition from rival promotions desperate to take the promotion's top spot in New England.

Another factor was the rapidly changing business during "the Attitude Era" instigated by Extreme Championship Wrestling, and later imitated by the World Wrestling Federation. The "sold shows", which had been the backbone of the CWA's success, had become more difficult to promote as the ex-NWA/WCW and WWF stars from the 1970s and 80s began retiring or had died. All these contributed to the promotions slow decline during the next several years.

=== NWA New England (2000–2003) ===
NWA New England was again present at the NWA 52nd Anniversary Show held at the Nashville Fairgrounds in Nashville, Tennessee. Among the NWA-affiliate promotions included NWA East (PWX), NWA Mid-South, NWA Mississippi, NWA Nashville, NWA New Jersey, NWA New York, NWA Ohio, NWA Southwest, NWA West Virginia and NWA UK Hammerlock. The main event saw Jason Rumble win the NWA New England heavyweight title from beat Beau Douglas by submission via the Boston crab. The match was dedicated to late Tony Rumble. In June, Jason Rumble represented NWA New England in the 2002 J-Cup tournament in Elizabeth, New Jersey, but lost to Scoot Andrews in the opening rounds.

Rick Fuller, then touring the Northeast independent circuit after his departure from WCW, returned to NWA New England and, on 9 June 2001, won a 20-man battle royal for the vacant NWA New England Brass Knuckles title in Milford, Massachusetts. In December 2001, Fuller assaulted then-referee Barry Ace during a match after he had unintentionally caused Fuller to mistime a wrestling move. This incident caused some controversy and NWA New England Vice President Vinnie Capelli later issued a public statement which accepted full responsibility explaining that Ace was not a fully trained referee at the time. Fuller remained in the promotion during the next year eventually winning the heavyweight title from Beau Douglas in Woonsocket, Rhode Island on 13 July 2002.

On 22 November 2002, the first annual Tony Rumble Memorial Show was held at the Wrestleplex in Woonsocket, the first of several tribute shows held in Tony Rumble's memory during the next five years. The "Tony Rumble Memorial Battle Royal won by 2nd Generation Brotherhood Member BIG DA The DarkAngel" would be introduced the following year and continued in later shows held by both NWA New England and the Millennium Wrestling Federation two years later. This would be one of the last events ever held in the Wrestleplex and it closed at the end of the month. The venue had not only been a home area for NWA New England but of several other local wrestling promotions including PWF Northeast, High Impact Championship Wrestling and the NWA New England developmental league Impact Independent Wrestling.

At the NWA 54th Anniversary show, held at the WrestlePlex in St. Petersburg, Florida on 26 October 2002, Jason Rumble defeated Rocky Reynolds in an interpromotional match between NWA New England and NWA Tri-State. The match was to decide the number one contender to the NWA World Junior Heavyweight Championship. His victory was assisted by outside interference from A.J. Styles and Mortimer Plumtree on Reynolds' behalf which backfire allowing him the victory.

On 6 April 2003, NWA New England held a fundraiser at Riverside Middle School in Riverside, Rhode Island for victims and families of the Station nightclub fire, the proceeds later being donated to related charities. The event also featured Jonah from WWE Tough Enough 3 who wrestled Jason Rumble in the main event. The promotion had been experiencing trouble booking events and had been on hiatus for the last seven months. While there were indications for a planned comeback during the summer, the promotion remained inactive for the remainder of the year.

=== NWA New England (2004–2006) ===
The promotion resumed running events again, with new arrivals Chad Merchant and Chad Peters, hired by Ellen Magliaro to take over promotion and booking duties. Two new titles were introduced that year. On 19 June 2004, Cameron Matthews defeated Shawn Styles, Gina Marie and Psycho in a three-way match in Sanford, Maine for the NWA New England Division X Championship. On 20 November, Gino Martino was awarded the NWA Colonial title after winning the annual 20-man battle royal at the 2004 Tony Rumble Memorial in Bellingham, Massachusetts. He later surrendered the title after winning the NWA New England Heavyweight title three months later. Just a week earlier, the Millennium Wrestling Federation had held its Tony Rumble Memorial battle royal at their Soul Survivor 2004 supercard held at Shawsheen Tech. The event was won by CWA alumni Bull Montana by eliminating The Outpatient. Montana had been Rumble's best friend and best man at his wedding.

During 2004 and early 2005, NWA New England became affiliated with another local promotion, New World Wrestling, and had together co-promoted the tribute show. The Colonial title was soon being defended in both promotions. On 5 February 2005, "Bionic" Dan Bidondi defeated Chris Blackheart, "Gorgeous" Donny Rotten and Don Vega for the vacant title at the supercard Extreme Revenge in Bellingham, Massachusetts. The title was eventually merged with the NWW Heavyweight Championship when Bidondi failed to arrive for a match against NWW Champion Beau Douglas at another supercard, Summer Blackout, in Attleboro, Massachusetts on 20 August, which ended the working partnership between the two promotions.

The previous month, Adam Booker beat Beau Douglas in a tournament final for the then vacant NWA New England Television title in Everett, Massachusetts. At the same event, Damien "Pitbull" Vachon and Pierre "The Beast" Vachon defeated The Rough Ryders (Nyxx and Devin Raines) in a three-way match with The Big Islanders (Kahoku and Makua) to win the NWA New England Tag Team titles. The Vachons, who had recently debuted in the promotion, are the sons of the legendary Paul Vachon and mainstays of NWA: Extreme Canadian Championship Wrestling.

At the 3-day NWA 57th Anniversary show in Springfield, Tennessee, NWA New England Tag Team Champions Damien & Pierre Vachon defeated NWA Green Mountain Tag Team Champions Really Sensational ("Real Deal" Jay Davis & "Sensational" Sean Reed) on 6 October. On the second night, they lost the titles to Sonny Roselli & Larry Huntley in a three-way match with the Big Islanders (Makua & Ka Hoku). The third and final night had an interpromotional match between Jason Rumble and NWA UK Hammerlock's Conscious in Nashville.

On 25 November 2005, NWA New England held the 6th annual Tony Rumble Memorial Show at the Ringside Entertainment Complex in Revere, Massachusetts. Celebrity wrestler Robby Ellis took part in the event. In the semi-main event, Luiz Ortiz defeated Beau Douglas for the vacant NWA New England Championship. During the annual battle royal, the veteran members eliminated the newer NWA members then stopped the battle royal to address the crowd with their fondest memories of Tony Rumble. At the conclusion of the night's events, Rumble's grandson Hunter was invited to the ring where he was given a baseball cap by Bull Montana. The MWF also held theirs weeks earlier, in association with AWA Superstars of Wrestling, at MWF Soul Survivor 2005 and which was won by Ox Baker.

On 30 July 2006, NWA New England was subjected to an "invasion" by Collision Pro Wrestling (now ACID Championship Wrestling) after inviting promoter Brian Reese and the CPW roster to promote their organization at an event held at Sanford Sound's 10th Annual Bikini Car Wash in Sanford, Maine. Reese and his roster mocked the promotion announced their intention to "destroy NWA New England". Three NWA New England members, two of which were Gino Bauer and Barry Ace, defected to the rival promotion at this event.

On 25 November 2006, in Saugus, Massachusetts, the 7th annual 2006 Tony Rumble Memorial featured several independent stars such as Wagner Brown, Scott Grimes and Millennium Wrestling Federation manager Johnny Fabulous, father of WWE wrestler John Cena. In the opening bout, Rumble had also won the Cruiserweight and X-Division titles in a five-way match between TNT, "Black Lotus" Matt Ledge, Paul Hudson and Cameron Matthews. On the undercard, Antonio Thomas defeated "Future Legend" Luke Robinson. Earlier in the night, two different matches were held to determine the opponents of NWA New England Heavyweight Champion Louis Ortiz in the main event. Wagner Brown defeated Beau Douglas and Scott Hanson in a triple threat match, and "Boston Bad Boy" Jason Rumble won a Royal Rumble-styled battle royal. Although Rumble had been eliminated, along with Todd Hanson, Johnny Fabulous distracted the referees while Rumble snuck back in and eliminated the last man Beau Douglas. Rumble ended up winning the match making Ortiz submit to an Elevated Boston crab. At the start of the match, the referee was seen taking money from Johnny Fabulous in exchange for a priority mail envelope alleged to have medical records related to an injury Ortiz had recently suffered. He was also observed making deliberate "slow counts" throughout the match. At the end of the night, Rumble walked away holding three championship titles.

=== Century Wrestling Alliance (2007) ===
Prior to 2007, Chad Merchant and Chad Peters had left NWA New England to start their own promotion in Vermont, NWA Green Mountain (later NWA Addicted). On 10 March 2007, Beau Douglas defeated Jason Rumble for the NWA New England Heavyweight title in Saugus, Massachusetts, ending Rumble's third reign as champion. Douglas had lost the title to Rumble six years before in Nashville, Tennessee. Matt Ledge also won the NWA New England Cruiserweight title in a five-way elimination match against Legion Cage, Paul Hudson, Cameron Matthews and Scotty Vegas. That same day, it was announced that NWA New England was leaving the National Wrestling Alliance after nearly a decade under its banner, returning to its original Century Wrestling Alliance name. Its last advertised event, the 8th annual Tony Rumble Memorial Show, was held in Saugus, Massachusetts on 17 November 2007, and has been inactive since that time.

== Championships ==
=== Current championships ===
- CWA Heavyweight Championship
- CWA New England Heavyweight Championship
- CWA Television Championship
- CWA Cruiserweight Championship
- CWA Tag Team Championship

=== Defunct and inactive championships ===
- NWA New England Heavyweight Championship
- NWA New England Junior Heavyweight Championship
- NWA New England Television Championship
- NWA New England Colonial Heavyweight Championship
- NWA New England Brass Knuckles Championship
- NWA New England X Division Championship
- NWA New England Women's Championship
- NWA New England Tag Team Championship

=== Tony Rumble Memorial Battle Royal winners ===
NWA New England has held an annual tribute show in memory of founder Tony Rumble since the year of his death, the Tony Rumble Memorial Battle Royal being introduced the following year. It is typically an "over-the-top" battle royal, at times using Royal Rumble rules, in which the winner receives a match against the NWA New England Heavyweight Champion in the main event. This event should not be confused with a separate version held by the Millennium Wrestling Federation which, although is also held as a tribute to Tony Rumble, has no connection to NWA New England and is held at their supercard Soul Survivor.

Year	Name	Date	Location	Notes
2000	Paul Zine	17 November 2000	Somerville, Massachusetts	
2001	Bull Montana	November 2001	Somerville, Massachusetts	
2002	BIG DA The DarkAngel	November 2002	Woonsocket Rhode Island	
2003	Todd Hansen	16 November 2003	Melrose, Massachusetts	
2004	The Dungeon Master and Gino Martino	19–20 November 2004	Sanford, Maine and Bellingham, Massachusetts	This was a two-day show with a special 5-year anniversary battle royal held both nights. Event was co-promoted with New World Wrestling.
2005	N/A	25 November 2005	Revere, Massachusetts	Battle royal was stopped when the participants ceased fighting and turned the event into a memorial to Tony Rumble. Wrestlers spoke to the crowd about their favorite memories of the promoter and his grandson was later invited to the ring.
2006	Jason Rumble	6 November 2005	Saugus, Massachusetts	
2007		17 November 2007	Saugus, Massachusetts	

== Alumni ==
- Tony Rumble
- "Mr. USA" Tony Atlas
- Vic Steamboat
- "Surfer" Ray Odyssey
- The Pink Assassin
- "Big" Val Puccio
- Robbie Ellis
- Kevin Sullivan
- Barry Windham
- Harley Race
- Jake "the Snake" Roberts
- Jimmy Snuka
- King Kong Bundy
- The Honky Tonk Man
- The Iron Sheik
- Doink the Clown
- Tommy Dreamer
- The Tazmaniac
- Al Snow
- Tom Brandi
- Rick Fuller
- Wagner Brown
- Metal Maniac
- Juggernaut
- Scott Grimes
- Christopher Annino aka Rescue 911
- Dan Quirk
- Trooper Gilmore
- Jason Rumble
- "The Black Dragon" Troy Bond
- J-Busta
- "Kidd USA" Jay Jaillet
- Gino Martino
- Joel Davis
- Barry Ace
- John Rodeo
- "Dynasty" Beau Douglas
- "The Future Legend" Luke Robinson
- Apocalypse
- "Italian Superman" Sonny Roselli
- "X Ray" Kyle Kruze
- Canadian Moondog
- "BIG DA" The DarkAngel
- Handsome Johnny
- Amanda Storm
- April Hunter
- LuFisto

== See also ==
- List of National Wrestling Alliance territories
- List of independent wrestling promotions in the United States
