= CWA Tag Team Championship (New England) =

Professional wrestling tag team championship

Details
- Promotion: Century Wrestling Alliance
- Date established: September 23, 1993
- Date retired: March 10, 2007
Statistics
- First champion(s): Double Trouble (Tony and Val Puccio)
- Final champion(s): Big Islanders (Makua and Kahoku)

The CWA Tag Team Championship is the primary wrestling tag team title in the Century Wrestling Alliance. Double Trouble (Tony and Val Puccio) were the first team to win the titles by defeating The Interns in Wakefield, Massachusetts on September 23, 1993. The title was renamed as the NWA New England Tag Team Championship when the CWA joined the National Wrestling Alliance and became NWA New England in January 1998. The tag team title returned to its original name when the CWA withdrew from the NWA on March 10, 2007.

== Title history ==
Silver areas in the history indicate periods of unknown lineage.

Wrestler:	Times:	Date:	Location:	Notes:
CWA Tag Team Championship
Double Trouble (Tony and Val Puccio)	1	September 23, 1993	Wakefield, Massachusetts	Defeated The Interns to become the first recognized champions.
Ray Odyssey and Vic Steamboat	1	March 25, 1994	Wakefield, Massachusetts	Defeated The Interns to become the first recognized champions.
Trouble Makers (Chaos and Mayhem)	1	July 1994		
Title history unrecorded.
Fatal Attractions	1			
Title history unrecorded.
Hollywood Kidz (Flash and Star)	1	January 1996		
Title history unrecorded.
Eric Sbraccia and Sonny C	1	July 1996		
Title history unrecorded.
The Public Enemy (Rocco Rock and Johnny Grunge)	1			
The Extremists (Ace Darling and Devon Storm)	1	July 24, 1996	Worcester, Massachusetts	
The Brotherhood (Erich Sbraccia and Knuckles Nelson)	1	October 18, 1997	Lawrence, Massachusetts	Title becomes the NWA New England Tag Team Championship on January 24, 1998, after the CWA joined the National Wrestling Alliance.
Renamed NWA New England Tag Team Championship
House of Pain (Frank Gulli and Joe Gulli)	1	September 18 or 19, 1998	Kingstown, Rhode Island	Defeated the New York Posse (Curtis Slamdawg and Jay Kobain) or Trooper Gilmore and Joel Davis for the titles.
Ark Angels (Damon D'Arcangelo and Phoenix King)	1	February 19, 1999	Mansfield, Massachusetts	
House of Pain (Frank Gulli and Joe Gulli)	2	February 19, 1999	Mansfield, Massachusetts	Won in rematch held the same night.
Ark Angels (Damon D'Arcangelo and Phoenix King)	2	March 13, 1999	Southbridge, Massachusetts	
The Brotherhood (Knuckles Nelson and Dukes Dalton)	1	August 22, 1999	Somerville, Massachusetts	Knuckles Nelson and Dukes Dalton also held the NWA World Tag Team Championship. At the time of the match, Nelson was also the reigning NWA New England Heavyweight Champion.
New York Posse (Curtis Slamdawg and Jay Kobain)	1	September 22, 1999	Somerville, Massachusetts	
The Brotherhood (Knuckles Nelson and Dukes Dalton)	2	October 2, 1999	Thomaston, Connecticut	
Title is declared vacant when The Brotherhood split up in February 2000.
The 2k Club (Jason Rage, Wagner Bown and Luis Ortiz)	1	June 22, 2000	Somerville, Massachusetts	Defeated Nemesis and Scarecrow and The Millennium Killaz (Muhammad The Butcher and Gino Martino) in a Triangle match
The Millennium Killaz (Muhammad The Butcher and Gino Martino)	1	July 20, 2000	Somerville, Massachusetts	Defeated The 2K Klub for the titles.
The 2k Club (Jason Rumble and Luis Ortiz)	1	August 24, 2000	Somerville, Massachusetts	Defeated Gino Martino by DQ and were awarded the titles.
Title is vacated in late-2002.
The Asylum (Apocalypse and Armageddon)	1	November 18, 2000	Somerville, Massachusetts	Defeated First Strike (Tiger Fang and Mike Lee) and (Rush and C.J. Brock) to win vacant title.
Title is declared vacant on May 6, 2001, when NWA New England Commissioner Vinnie CaPelli strips The Asylum of the titles at NWA New England Spotlite in Melrose, Massachusetts.
Criminally Insane (Trooper Gilmore and The Outpatient)	1	July 21, 2001	Wakefield, Massachusetts	Defeated Zak Mason and Chris Charisma at the Knights of Columbus Hall during the Summer Sizzler Tour to win the vacant titles.
Trailer Park Trash ("Dirty" Deuce Malone and "The Scrub" Steve Sabo)	1	September 27, 2001	Woburn, Massachusetts	
Kappa Tegga Kegga (Curt Daniels and Andy Jaxx)	1	June 1, 2002	Woonsocket, Rhode Island	
The Seven (Vertabreaker and Apocalypse)	1	July 13, 2002	Woonsocket, Rhode Island	
Todd Hanson and Beau Douglas	1	April 6, 2003	Riverside, Rhode Island	
The Elite (Sonny Roselli and Larry Huntley)	1	June 19, 2004	Sanford, Maine	Defeated The Beau Douglas and Handsome Johnny to win the title.
The Rough Ryders (Nixx and Raines)	1	November 19, 2004	Sanford, Maine	Defeated The Elite (Roselli and Huntley) and Mark Moment and Paulie Gilmore in a Triple Threat Match at the 2004 Tony Rumble Memorial Show.
The Elite (Sonny Roselli and Larry Huntley)	1	October 7, 2005	Springfield, Tennessee	Defeated Pierre and Damien and the Big Islanders in a three-way match at the NWA 57th Anniversary Show to win the titles.
5-0 (Trooper Gilmore and Corporal Johnson)	1	November 25, 2005	Revere, Massachusetts	Defeated Larry Huntley and Nick Santone (subbing for Sonny Roselli) and Makua and Eric Egoh in a three-way match at the 2006 Tony Rumble Memorial Show to win the titles.
The Vachon Brothers (Pierre and Damien Vachon)	1	May 11, 2006	Fall River, Massachusetts	
Big Islanders (Makua and Kahoku)	1	June 24, 2006	Revere, Massachusetts	Title is changed back to its original name after the promotion leaves the NWA on March 10, 2007.
Renamed CWA Tag Team Championship
