= NWA New England Women's Championship =

Professional wrestling women's championship

Details
- Promotion: NWA New England
- Date established: September 15, 1999
- Date retired: March 2000
Statistics
- First champion(s): Violet Flame
- Final champion(s): Vince Viccalo

The NWA New England Women's Heavyweight Championship was the primary women's professional wrestling title in the Century Wrestling Alliance. It was one of the first titles to be introduced when the promotion joined the National Wrestling Alliance and became NWA New England in January 1998. Violet Flame defeated Amanda Storm in Bridgeport, Connecticut on September 15, 1999, to become first champion. Amanda Storm was later awarded the title three months later, then lost the title to male wrestler Vince Viccalo whereupon it vacant in March 2000 and eventually abandoned.

== Title history ==
Silver areas in the history indicate periods of unknown lineage.

Wrestler:	Times:	Date:	Location:	Notes:
Violet Flame	1	September 15, 1999	Bridgeport, Connecticut	Defeated Amanda Storm to become first recognized champion.
Title history unrecorded during late-1999.
Amanda Storm	1	1999		Awarded the title.
Vince Viccalo	1	January 16, 2000	Wethersfield, Connecticut	
Title vacant in March 2000.
