= CWA Cruiserweight Championship =

Professional wrestling championship

Details
- Promotion: Century Wrestling Alliance
- Date established: January 3, 1993
- Date retired: March 10, 2007

Other name(s)
- CWA Light Heavyweight Championship
Statistics
- First champion(s): The Tazmaniac
- Final champion(s): Matt Ledge
- Most reigns: Jason Rumble (4 reigns)

The CWA Cruiserweight Championship is the primary lightweight wrestling title in the Century Wrestling Alliance. It was first introduced as the CWA Light Heavyweight Championship and won by The Tazmaniac who defeated Flexx Wheeler in a tournament final held in Windsor Locks, Connecticut on January 3, 1993. The title was mostly dominated by IWCCW veterans Ray Odyssey and The Pink Assassin, both of whom feuded with El Mascarado over the title for much of the 1990s. The title was renamed as the NWA New England Cruiserweight Championship when the CWA joined the National Wrestling Alliance and became NWA New England in January 1998. A year later, it changed to the NWA New England Junior Heavyweight Championship and co-promoted with NWA East / Pro Wrestling eXpress. The title was defended throughout the New England area, most often in Massachusetts and Connecticut, from 1999 until 2002 when it became inactive for a year. The title was revived as the NWA Cold Front Cruiserweight Championship in 2006 but returned to its original name when the CWA withdrew from the NWA on March 10, 2007.

== Title history ==
Silver areas in the history indicate periods of unknown lineage.

Wrestler:	Times:	Date:	Location:	Notes:
CWA Light Heavyweight Championship
The Tazmaniac	1	January 3, 1993	Windsor Locks, Connecticut	Defeated Flexx Wheeler in a tournament final to become the first recognized champion.
Ray Odyssey	1	February 9, 1993	Waltham, Massachusetts	
El Mascarado	1	September 25, 1993	York, Maine	
Ray Odyssey	2	December 5, 1993	Plymouth, Massachusetts	
El Mascarado	2	May 22, 1994	Lynn, Massachusetts	
The Pink Assassin	1	December 23, 1995	Provincetown, Massachusetts	
El Mascarado	3	March 8, 1996	Manchester, New Hampshire	
The Pink Assassin	2	November 26, 1996	Rutland, Vermont	
El Mascarado	4	January 31, 1997	Chelsea, Massachusetts	
Joel Davis	1	February 18, 1997	Chelsea, Massachusetts	
Millennium	1	September 18, 1997	Lawrence, Massachusetts	
Title is renamed the NWA New England Cruiserweight Championship when the CWA joins the National Wrestling Alliance on January 24, 1998. Millennium is recognised as its first champion.
Renamed NWA New England Cruiserweight Championship
Tre	1	May 9, 1998	Somerville, Massachusetts	
Luis Ortiz	1	December 29, 1998	Somerville, Massachusetts	Title is renamed as the NWA New England Junior Heavyweight Championship around March 1999.
Renamed NWA New England Junior Heavyweight Championship
Jay Jaillet	1	April 3, 1999	Milford, Connecticut	
Jeff Mangles	1	June 19, 1999	Dorchester, Massachusetts	Defeated Jaillet in a 3-way match.
Jason Rage	1	August 22, 1999	Somerville, Massachusetts	
Jeff Mangles	2	January 16, 2000	Wethersfield, Connecticut	Defeated Rage and Wagner Brown in a triple threat match to win the title.
Title is vacated in early-2000.
Luis Ortiz	2	March 11, 2000	Southbridge, Massachusetts	Defeated Jason Rage for the title.
Jay Jaillet	1	April 22, 2000	Salisbury, Massachusetts	
Vince Vicallo	1	June 22, 2000	Somerville, Massachusetts	Defeated Tiger Fang, Dan Bidondi and Luis Ortiz in a triangle match.
Dan Bidondi	1	September 28, 2000	Somerville, Massachusetts	
Joel Davis	1	November 18, 2000	Somerville, Massachusetts	
Zak Mason	1	March 26, 2001	Somerville, Massachusetts	
Kid Narcissistic	1	October 27, 2001	Woburn, Massachusetts	
Jason Rumble	1	April 20, 2002	Indiana, Pennsylvania	
Kid Narcissistic	2	June 1, 2002	Woonsocket, Rhode Island	
Title is vacated in 2002.
Jason Rumble	2	July 2002	Woonsocket, Rhode Island	
Title is vacated on July 13, 2002, when Rumble is stripped of the title for outside interference.
Tommy Knoxville	2	August 24, 2002	Woonsocket, Rhode Island	Defeated T.J. Richer in singles match to win vacant title.
Jason Rumble	3	September 18, 2002	Woonsocket, Rhode Island	
Captain Charisma and Spider	1	September 18, 2002	Woonsocket, Rhode Island	Won in a tag team match against Jason Rumble & Paulie Gilmore.
Both Captain Charisma and Spider are named co-champions after winning a tag team match, sanctioned by CWA Commissioner Marc Greene, against Jason Rumble & Paulie Gilmore. Initially defending the championship together, the title is vacated and inactive by October 2003.
Renamed NWA Cold Front Cruiserweight Championship
Paul Hudson	1	May 12, 2006		Defeated Cameron Replay in a tournament final to win the revived title. The title reverted to its original name when the promotion left the NWA on March 10, 2007.
Jason Rumble	4	November 25, 2006	Saugus, Massachusetts	Defeated Paul Hudson, Matt Ledge, Cameron Matthews and TNT in a five-way match at the '2006 Tont Rumble Memorial Show. As well as the Cruiserweight title, Rumble also gained the NWA New England X Division title from Ledge during this match.
Title becomes vacant in late-2006 or early-2007.
Matt Ledge	1	March 10, 2007	Saugus, Massachusetts	Defeated Legion Cage, Paul Hudson, Cameron Matthews and Scotty Vegas in an elimination match. The promotion also leaves the NWA at this event and the title reverts to its original name.
Renamed CWA Cruiserweight Championship
