= Georgiann Makropoulos =

American wrestling historian and author

Georgiann Makropoulos (1943 – January 25, 2010) was an American wrestling historian and author. Makropoulos was also the editor of The Wrestling Chatterbox, a monthly newsletter. She also worked on several wrestling websites.

== Biography ==
Born Georgiann Mastis, she became a fixture in the New York area wrestling scene. She started writing for wrestling magazines in the early 1960s, and maintained a fan club for (Nature Boy) Buddy Rogers. She later served as vice president of a fan club for Bruno Sammartino. She maintained friendships with many of the wrestlers, who considered her a trusted confidant. Makropoulos was always encouraging young fans who wanted to get involved with wrestling by publishing newsletters. She wrote a fan club column for Wrestling World that tried to help publicize the clubs and newsletters. Later, she would start her own Wrestling Chatterbox newsletter, which focused on non-mainstream news like listing wrestlers' birthdays and their personal appearance schedules for autograph signings. She also had a longtime association with Dave Meltzer and the Wrestling Observer newsletter, also hosting a segment on Meltzer's hotline on Sundays for a long time.

Makropoulos saw her first wrestling event in 1959. She remained a lifelong fan and continued to research and write about wrestling until her death. She died on January 25, 2010, of a heart attack. She was buried with a favorite photo, one that showed her flanked by Rogers and Sammartino. Although the two wrestlers did not get along in real life, they were willing to pose with her because of the esteem they had for her and her support of their careers.

In 2012 Markropoulos was inducted into the WSU Hall Of Fame.

== Championships and accomplishments ==
- New England Pro Wrestling Hall of Fame, Class of 2011
- Women Superstars Uncensored, WSU Hall of Fame (Class of 2012)
