= NWA Brass Knuckles Championship (New England version) =

Professional wrestling championship

Details
- Promotion: NWA New England
- Date established: June 22, 2000
- Date retired: March 4, 2006
Statistics
- First champion(s): Mike Johnson
- Final champion(s): Christopher Annino Rescue 911

The New England version of the NWA Brass Knuckles Championship was a secondary championship that was used and defended in the National Wrestling Alliance affiliated NWA New England promotion. Created in 2000, the title was used in specialty matches in which the combatants would wear brass knuckles. The championship was regularly used and defended within the promotion before being abandoned in late 2004. Throughout the history of the NWA, a number of NWA affiliated promotions used their own territorial brass knuckles championship, with the ones used in Fritz Von Erich's World Class Championship Wrestling based in Dallas, Texas and Eddie Graham's Championship Wrestling from Florida being two of the most prominent.

Wrestler	Reigns	Date	Location	Notes
Mike Johnson	1	June 22, 2000	Somerville, Massachusetts	Defeats Trooper Gilmore to become the first champion.
Trooper Gilmore	1	July 20, 2000	Somerville, Massachusetts	N/A
Gino Martino	1	August 24, 2000	Somerville, Massachusetts	Defeats Trooper Gilmore, Nemesis, Jaime Paine, and Zach Mason. However, he is stripped sometime later for attacking the commissioner.
The Outpatient	1	November, 2000	Unknown	He is awarded the vacated title, though he vacates it at a later date.
Rick Fuller	1	June 9, 2001	Milford, Massachusetts	Wins the vacant title in a 20-man battle royal.
Eric Sbraccia	1	February 16, 2002	Malden, Massachusetts	Vacates the title after leaving the promotion.
Gino Martino	2	June 6, 2004	Buxton, Maine	Wins a 12-man taped fist battle royal.
Osirus	1	August 3, 2004	Buxton, Maine	N/A
Gino Martino	3	August 10, 2004	Buxton, Maine	Abandoned
Christopher Annino Rescue 911		March 4, 2006	−	

== See also ==
- List of National Wrestling Alliance championships
- Hardcore wrestling
