= Ray Odyssey =

American professional wrestler (born 1968)

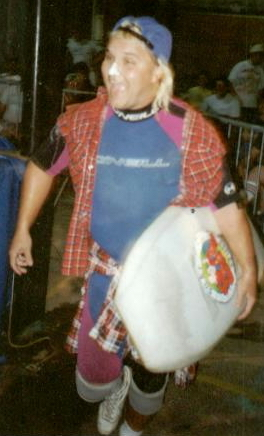
- Odyssey in 1994

Personal information
- Born: Ray Samalonis; January 31, 1968 (age 58) Cherry Hill, New Jersey, US

Professional wrestling career
- Ring name: Ray Odyssey
- Billed height: 5 ft 9 in (1.75 m)
- Billed weight: 222 lb (101 kg)
- Billed from: San Diego, California
- Trained by: Charlie Fulton; Larry Sharpe
- Debut: 1986

Ray Samalonis (born January 31, 1968) is an American professional wrestler, better known by his ring name "Surfer" Ray Odyssey.

== Professional wrestling career ==
Odyssey competes primarily in Northeastern and Mid-Atlantic independent promotions. Odyssey has had successful stints in Mid-South Wrestling, American Wrestling Association, International World Class Championship Wrestling, Extreme Championship Wrestling and the National Wrestling Alliance during the late 1980s and throughout the 1990s and he also made a brief television appearance in the World Wrestling Federation and defeated Tazz in a dark match in 1991.

In addition to wrestling as a singles competitor, Odyssey also formed several successful tag teams with partners such as Vic Steamboat, Chris Evans and most notably with The Inferno Kid (as "The Beach Bullies") and Jimmy Deo (as "Surf and Turf").

== Championships and accomplishments ==
- Can-Am Wrestling
  - Can-Am Light Heavyweight Championship (1 time)
- Century Wrestling Alliance
  - CWA Light Heavyweight Championship (2 times)
  - CWA Tag Team Championship (1 time) – with Vic Steamboat
- International World Class Championship Wrestling
  - IWCCW Light Heavyweight Championship (1 time)
- National Wrestling Alliance
  - NWA United States Tag Team Championship (1 time) – with The Inferno Kid
- NWA Northeast Wrestling
  - NWA Northeast Light Heavyweight Championship (1 time)
- Pennsylvania Championship Wrestling
  - PCW United States Heavyweight Championship (1 time) Defeated Kane
  - PCW Tag Team Championship (1 time) – with Jimmy Deo
- Pro Wrestling Illustrated
  - PWI ranked him # 170 of the 500 best singles wrestlers of the PWI 500 in 1992
- World Wrestling Association
  - WWA Junior Heavyweight Championship (3 times)
