= Mortimer Plumtree =

American actor

Personal information
- Born: David Webber; 1969 (age 56–57) Minneapolis, Minnesota

Professional wrestling career
- Ring name(s): Mortimer Plumtree; Aloysius Hayes
- Billed height: 6 ft 1 in (185 cm)
- Billed weight: 215 lb (98 kg)
- Trained by: Lenny Lane, JB Trask, Jerry Lynn
- Debut: 1994
- Retired: 2005

David Webber (born 1969) is an actor and former professional wrestling manager, best known by his ring name Mortimer Plumtree. His biggest exposure came during the early days of NWA Total Nonstop Action Wrestling in 2002.

== History ==
Webber grew up in the same area of Minnesota as the infamous “Robbinsdale” crew of Curt Hennig, Rick Rude, The Road Warriors, Barry Darsow, Nikita Koloff, Tom Zenk, Brady Boone and John Nord, among others. Webber has amateur wrestling and judo background, and performed high school theater with actor Steve Zahn and in college theater with actress Melissa Peterman. He has several stage and independent film credits, including The Orb, written and directed by Matthew Burns (wrestler Nick Mondo).

== Independents ==
Webber broke into the professional wrestling ranks under the tutelage of former AWA ring announcer Mick Karch in June 1994. Early on, his character was aligned with future WCW Cruiserweight Champion Lenny Lane, and the duo appeared on independent cards throughout the upper Midwest region. In 1996, Webber appeared in Paul Alperstein’s nationally-televised promotion, the American Wrestling Federation, under the guise of Aloysius Hayes, Lord Alfred Hayes’ nephew.

Though slated for a try-out with WCW in the fall of 1997, Webber was ejected from the locker room following a misunderstanding with then-Vice President Eric Bischoff. After the incident, Webber appeared less-frequently and was rumored to have retired to focus on religion. However, he began to make waves in the newly formed Steel Domain Wrestling in mid-1998 and became manager for the “Chicago Group” of Ace Steel, Danny Dominion and Brad Bradley, along with Magnus Maximus and others.

== TNA ==
In early 2002, Webber was contacted by Jeremy Borash, who had given him a great deal of exposure on his Wrestling Radio show. Borash was in the midst of forming Total Nonstop Action along with Jeff Jarrett, Jerry Jarrett, and Bob Ryder. After Borash had previewed a videotape of Webber for the Jarretts from years earlier, the Jarretts immediately showed interest in signing the manager to his first national contract.

Webber appeared as Mortimer Plumtree for NWA TNA on its first worldwide broadcast on June 19, 2002, from Huntsville, Alabama, managing the masked Johnson Brothers, Richard and Rod (aka the Shane Twins). After only two shows, the Johnsons were released from their contracts and Plumtree appeared only infrequently. During this time, Webber became a full-time staff member for the fledgling promotion, traveling between his home in Minnesota, where his family continued to live, and Nashville, Tennessee, where the TNA offices are located.

In October 2002, Plumtree was paired with his old friend from the SDW days, Ace Steel. Again, TNA dropped Steel from his contract after only a few shows, and realigned Plumtree with standout A.J. Styles. Over the next few months, Plumtree aided Styles in wars against two fellow Minnesotans, Sean Waltman and Jerry Lynn.

In January 2003, TNA booker Vince Russo allegedly wrote the Plumtree character out of all future TNA programming due to his feeling that Webber was aligned with Jerry Jarrett in office politics. He remained on staff full-time until June, when he moved back to Minnesota. He would appear only a handful of times after that, both for the failed Force 1 Wrestling promotion he assisted with booking and with another short-lived group, the American Wrestling League.

== Wrestlers managed by Plumtree ==
- Lenny Lane
- Ken Anderson
- Shawn Daivari
- Ace Steel
- A.J. Styles
- Brad Bradley
- Nailz
- The Honky Tonk Man
- The Johnsons
- Danny Dominion
- Magnus Maximus
- JB Trask
- Scott Zappa
