= IWCCW Light Heavyweight Championship =

Professional wrestling championship

Details
- Promotion: International Championship Wrestling (1985–January 1991); International World Class Championship Wrestling (January 1991–1995)
- Date established: 1987
- Date retired: 1995

Other name(s)
- ICW Light Heavyweight Championship
Statistics
- First champion(s): Robbie Ellis
- Most reigns: Robbie Ellis (3 reigns)
- Longest reign: Ray Odyssey (521+ days) (Note: The exact date Odyssey won the championship is not documented which means the championship reign lasted anywhere between 521 days and 885 days)
- Shortest reign: Joe Savoldi (133 days) (Note: Certain title changes are not documented, which makes it possible that someone had a shorter reign.)
- Oldest champion: Robbie Ellis (52 years, 84 days)
- Youngest champion: Eric Sbraccia (19 years, 7 days)
- Heaviest champion: Eric Sbraccia (270 lb (120 kg))
- Lightest champion: Robbie Ellis (180 lb (82 kg))

The ICW / IWCCW Light Heavyweight Championship was the championship for Light heavyweights at a maximum weight of 220 lbs. in International World Class Championship Wrestling. The title existed from 1987 until the federation closed its doors in 1995. The title was first promoted as the “International Championship Wrestling Light Heavyweight” Title but was later renamed the “International World Class Championship Wrestling Light Heavyweight title” when the federation was renamed as well. Because the championship is a professional wrestling championship, it is not won or lost competitively but instead by the decision of the bookers of a wrestling promotion. The championship is awarded after the chosen team "wins" a match to maintain the illusion that professional wrestling is a competitive sport.

== Title history ==
Key
No.	Overall reign number
Reign	Reign number for the specific champion
Days	Number of days held

No.	Champion	Championship change			Reign statistics		Notes	Ref.
No.	Champion	Date	Event	Location	Reign	Days	Notes	Ref.
1	Robbie Ellis	February 8, 1987	N/A	Sarasota, FL	1	(Note: The exact date ICW recognized Robbie Ellis as the champion is not documented which means the championship reign lasted anywhere between 1 day and 273 days)	defeats Brian Walsh according to the Bangor Daily News on March 14th, 1987.	
2	Eric Sbraccia	October 1, 1987	ICW show	Dover, New Hampshire	1	454		
3	Robbie Ellis	December 28, 1988	ICW show	Augusta, Maine	2	(Note: The exact date Ellis lost the championship is not documented which means the championship reign lasted anywhere between 4 days and 368 days)		
4	Ray Odyssey	1989	ICW show	(Note: The location of the match was not captured as part of the championship documentation.)	1			
5	the Tasmaniac	June 5, 1991	IWCCW show	Brooklyn, New York	1	204		
6	Joe Savoldi	December 26, 1991	IWCCW show	Monticello, New York	1	134		
7	Makumba	May 8, 1992	IWCCW show	Hamburg, Pennsylvania	1	286		
8	Joe Savoldi	February 18, 1993	IWCCW show	Monticello, New York	2	133		
—	Deactivated	July 1, 1993	—	—	—	—	The title was not defended for a period of time from 1993 to 1995.	
9	Robbie Ellis	July 1, 1995	IWCCW show		3	(Note: The exact date IWCCW closed is not documented which means the championship reign lasted anywhere between 1 day and 183 days)	It is not clear who Ellis defeated to win the championship, or if he even won it from someone.	
—	Deactivated	1995	—	—	—	—	IWCCW Closes down.	
