= Paulie Gilmore =

American professional wrestler

Personal information
- Born: James E. Allen Boston, Massachusetts, United States
- Website: BigPaulieGilmore.com

Professional wrestling career
- Ring name(s): Paulie Gilmore; Paulie Gilmorea; Trooper Gilmore
- Billed height: 6 ft 0 in (1.83 m)
- Billed weight: 275 lb (125 kg)
- Billed from: North End of Boston
- Debut: 1994

James E. Allen is an American professional wrestler and promoter, best known by his ringname "Big" Paulie Gilmore or Gilmorea, who wrestled on the New England independent circuit for the Century Wrestling Alliance, the National Wrestling Alliance, the Millennium Wrestling Federation and the World Wrestling Alliance during the 1990s and early 2000s. He is also the owner of New World Wrestling, a small promotion based in southeastern Massachusetts, which was formerly associated with NWA New England from 2004 to 2005.

He is best remembered as Trooper Gilmore, a popular super heavyweight "fan favorite", in both the original Century Wrestling Alliance and NWA New England where he was a main rival of "heel" wrestler Tony Rumble. He also won the NWA New England Tag Team Championship with The Outpatient as Criminally Insane and Corporal Robinson as 5-0. He was an ally of MWF Tag Team Champions Todd Hanson & Beau Douglas during their feud with Ox Baker's MWF stable Ox's Army and, in NWW, twice won the promotion's tag team titles with Jimmy "Jact" Cash and Brutus "the Barber" Beefcake. He has also been a frequent opponent of King Kong Bundy and Abdullah the Butcher when touring the Northeastern United States.

== Career ==
=== Century Wrestling Alliance (1996-1998) ===
James E. Allen made his debut in 1994 and spent a brief time on the local independent circuit prior to joining the Century Wrestling Alliance in 1996. It was in the CWA that he would become a mainstay as Trooper Gilmore for over a decade. Appearing on the promotion's Public-access television cable TV show Mass Madness, he lost to Tombstone at the Harry DellaRusso Stadium in Revere, Massachusetts on June 27, 1997. On October 4, he fought twice in one night while at The Sports Palace in New Britain, Connecticut losing to both The Outpatient and King Kong Bundy. Two weeks later, Allen fought three matches in two separate events. The first was against Tombstone at the sold-out Good Time Emporium in Somerville, Massachusetts. Later that evening in Lawrence, he lost to El Diablo and Erich Sbraccia, the latter one half of the CWA Tag Team Champions with Knuckles Nelson. This event was also sold out.

=== NWA New England (1998-2001) ===
Allen remained with the promotion as it joined the National Wrestling Alliance as NWA New England in 1998. He would, however, make appearances for the Universal Wrestling Alliance and Unified Championship Wrestling during the late-1990s. On June 7, 1998, he and Joel Davis lost to "Big" Val Puccio in a handicap match at the Devine Ice Arena in Dorchester, Massachusetts. He also wrestled Joe Gulla, one half of the House of Pain with Frank Gulli, later that night. Allen formed a brief tag team with Steve Morabito in his feud with then NWA New England Tag Team Champions House of Pain but broke up following their loss to them at the Taste of the Boss supercard in Boston on September 19. This was the team's first title defense since winning the titles from the New York Posse (Curtis Slamdawg & Jay Kobain) the previous day. That same day, he wrestled another two matches at the Everett Rec Center in Everett, Massachusetts. The first was against Tre' and the second a tag team match with Joel Davis against the House of Pain.

On February 12, 1999, Allen won his first major title when he defeated Curtis Slamdawg for the NWA New England Heavyweight Championship in Mansfield, Massachusetts, but lost the title to Knuckles Nelson a week later. This match was later aired on its weekly television series, Mass Madness. Allen would eventually become a main rival of Tony Rumble, one of the promotion's top "heels" and leader of The Brotherhood (Dukes Dalton, Rick Fuller, Knuckles Nelson & Eric Sbraccia). His match against Rumble at Southbridge High School on March 13 was included when the promotion was featured on ESPN's Outside the Lines. He took six "chair shots" from different members of The Brotherhood before he was pinned by Rumble. On April 3, he again lost to King Kong Bundy in Milford, Connecticut and also Dean Power, one-half of World Championship Wrestling's The Power Company, at the Good Times Emporium on April 22. He also took part in the promotion's first show outside New England three days later, promoted under its original name, teaming with Joel Davis to defeat The Outpatients in Ogdensburg, New York on April 25. On May 29, 1999, he lost to Brotherhood member Dukes Dalton at the Good Times Emporium.

On June 22, 2000, Allen lost to Mike Johnson in a match to determine the first NWA New England Brass Knuckles Champion in Somerville, but won the title from Johnson in a rematch a month later. Allen held the title for several weeks until losing to Gino Martino in a five-way match with Zach Mason, Jaime Paine and Nemesis on August 24. At the end of the year, Allen was one of several wrestlers from NWA New England and Extreme Championship Wrestling to appear for Mike Sparta's World Wrestling Alliance in Lynn, Massachusetts on November 25, 2000. Jimmy Snuka and The Patriot were also on the card.

In early-2001, Allen was awarded NWA New England Television Championship by his then manager and former champion Bull Montana on NWA New England Spotlight. He lost the title to Beau Douglas who beat him in a televised match in May 2001. Allen then formed a tag team with former rival The Outpatient, calling themselves Criminally Insane, and defeated Zak Mason & Chris Charisma for the vacant NWA New England Tag Team Championship at the Knights of Columbus Hall in Wakefield, Massachusetts on July 21, 2001. This was during the promotion's Summer Sizzler Tour. He also appeared at a weekend event at Killer Kowalski's Institute of Professional Wrestling on August 10. Among those present included Frankie Kazarian, Jason Rumble, Vinnie Capelli, John Rodeo and The Ark Angels (Damon D'Arcangelo and Phoenix King). He and The Outpatient would hold the titles for over three months before dropping the belts to Trailer Park Trash ("Dirty" Deuce Malone and "The Scrub" Steve Sabo) in Woburn, Massachusetts on October 27, 2001.

=== Independent circuit and New World Wrestling (2002-2004) ===
Allen branched out to other parts of the country during the first half of 2002, mostly in other National Wrestling Alliance-affiliated promotions in the Eastern United States and in Florida. In February 2002, he entered the Best of the Best Tournament, co-promoted by NWA East and NWA Tri-State, but was eliminated by Nikita Allanov in the opening rounds in Titusville, Pennsylvania. He also made two appearances at the City Park Pavilion in Parkersburg, West Virginia wrestling NWA Tri-State's Dash Bennett on February 2 and Mr. Attitude on April 6, the latter match resulting in a double-countout. He also made a one-time appearance for Jason Knight's Assault Championship Wrestling facing Jason Rage on September 17 edition of Assault TV: The Dot Com Edition.

In the spring of 2003, he made several appearances for Ultimate Championship Wrestling. On March 2, he was pinned by UCW Television Champion "Nature Boy" Gary Gold in a triple threat match with "Iceberg" Sonny D. at Club Escapades in Raynham, Massachusetts. Three weeks later at a local high school in Canton, Massachusetts, Allen joined La Familia members Tony Cianci and Vinny Giuliani in a 6-man tag team match against Paco Rivera, D.C. Dillon and "Diehard" Eddie Edwards which ended in a double-disqualification. One of his last appearance was at the Family Center in Braintree, Massachusetts in which he and Apocalypse lost to UCW Tag Team Champions Beau Douglas & Todd Hansen. Before leaving the promotion, he lost to UCW Heavyweight Champion Don Vega in a triple threat match with the Outpatient on April 23.

In late-2003, Allen formed his own promotion, New World Wrestling, and appeared at its first show held on December 6, 2003. Shortly afterwards, Allen dropped his former in-ring persona of Trooper Gilmore to return "to his Italian roots" and began wrestling under the name "Big" Paulie Gilmore (or Gilmorea). He soon formed a tag team with Jimmy "Jact" Cash known as Men of Business and, on July 25, 2004, lost to The Millennium Killaz (Gino Martino and Ali Mohammed) in a match to crown the first NWW Tag Team Champions. The titles were vacated later that year when Ali Mohammed suffered a near-career ending injury, a cracked tibiae and torn ligaments, during a match with Allen for Ultimate Championship Wrestling in Attleboro, Massachusetts.

Returning to NWA New England for the 2004 Tony Rumble Memorial Show in Sanford, Maine, he and Mark Moment lost to The Rough Ryders (Nixx and Raines) in a triple threat match with The Elite (Sonny Roselli and Larry Huntley) for the NWA New England Tag Team titles. The following night in Bellingham, Massachusetts, Allen won the vacant NWW Tag Team Championship in a match against The Widowmaker & “Dangerous” Donny Rotten. Anthony "Spaz" Parziale, an on-air radio personality for WAAF, was the cornerman for Men of Business. They lost the titles to Southern Extreme (Widowmaker and The Texas Outlaw) in Attleboro on August 20, 2005. That same night, Allen became the first NWW SuperCrush Battle Royal Champion and held the title until it was won by Pierre Vachon almost two years later.

=== Millennium Wrestling Federation and NWA New England (2005-2006) ===
In 2005, Allen debuted in the Millennium Wrestling Federation with manager Bull Montana and allied himself with MWF Tag Team Champions Todd Hanson & Beau Douglas in their feud with Ox Baker's stable Ox Baker's Army (The Outpatient, Pierre "The Beast" Vachon & The Islanders). He also soon found himself subject to a kayfabe vendetta by MWF Commissioner Dr. Von Johnson who would force him to wrestle increasing difficult opponents and stipulations. At the Road to the Gold supercard, Allen lost to The Outpatient and, the following month at Halloween Horror, had to wrestle The Islanders in handicap match. Allen joined Todd Hanson & Beau Douglas in an 8-man tag team match with The Sandman to defeat Ox Baker's Army at the Soul Survivor III supercard in Lynn, Massachusetts on November 5, 2005. This effectively ended the near 2-year feud between Todd Hanson & Beau Douglas and Ox Baker. Manager Johnny Fabulous also made his debut in this match and would appear with Todd Hanson & Beau Douglas for the next few months. Allen was later named as a suspect when Dr. Von Johnson was assaulted by an unknown assailant while leaving the Braintree Moose Lodge after an MWF event.

He also began teaming with Apocalypse, then under the name Corporal Robinson, as 5-0 in NWA New England. On November 25, 2005 at the 6th annual Tony Rumble Memorial Show, he and Robinson won the NWA New England Tag Team Championship from Larry Huntley and Nick Santone, substituting for Sonny Roselli, in a triple threat match with Makua and Eric Egoh at Ringside Entertainment Complex in Revere, Massachusetts. He and Robinson eventually lost the titles to Pierre and Damien Vachon in Fall River, Massachusetts on May 11, 2006.

=== New World Wrestling (2007-2009) ===
After nearly two years, the NWW SuperCrush Battle Royal Championship was won by Pierre Vachon in Sandwich, Massachusetts on March 31, 2007. On March 11, 2008, he was interviewed on the internet radio show In Your Head in which he discussed his career and promoted New World Wrestling's upcoming tour of Cape Cod. On March 29, Allen defeated Brickhouse Baker at the Plymouth Community Intermediate School in Plymouth, Massachusetts. On April 5, in East Sandwich, Massachusetts, Allen and New World Wrestling participated in a benefit show for the Sandwich High School wrestling team The Blue Knights. During the event, Allen accepted an open challenge put out by then NWW Tag Team Champions Moondog Maximus & Professor Sushi. Sushi had substituted for regular tag team partner Tony Kahuko. He later revealed his partner as former World Wrestling Federation superstar Brutus "The Barber" Beefcake and together went on to win the tag team titles that night. Allen and Beefcake were stripped of the titles following the event. Since neither team had a tag team partner "authorized by NWW Board of Directors", according to NWW Commissioner Steve Burgundy, the titles were declared vacant and would be filled at a later date.

On January 17, 2009, Allen wrestled APCW Heavyweight Champion "Bionic" Dan Bidondi in an event for Action Packed Championship Wrestling at the American Legion Hall in Seekonk, Massachusetts. This was Bidondi's first title defense since winning the title from "Nature Boy" Gary Gold who had also been suspended from the promotion with his manager Johnny Fabulous. On March 11, he made a second appearance on In Your Head to promote an upcoming New World Wrestling event at Sandwich High School. The event featured former Extreme Championship Wrestling veterans Justin Credible and Spike Dudley. The show was later broadcast live on In Your Head on March 14.

== Championships and accomplishments ==
- NWA New England
  - NWA New England Heavyweight Championship (1 time)
  - NWA New England Television Championship (1 time)
  - NWA New England Brass Knuckles Championship (1 time)
  - NWA New England Tag Team Championship (2 times) - with The Outpatient and Corporal Robinson
- New World Wrestling
  - NWW SuperCrush Battle Royal Championship (1 time)
  - NWW Tag Team Championship (2 times) - with Jimmy "Jact" Cash and Brutus "the Barber" Beefcake
- Regional Championship Wrestling

- RCW Tag Team Championship (1 time) - with Lucifer

- Other titles
  - UCW Heavyweight Championship (1 time)
- Pro Wrestling Illustrated

- PWI ranked him #381 of the 500 best singles wrestlers of the PWI 500 in 2001.
