= Robbie Ellis =

American professional wrestler (1943–2025)

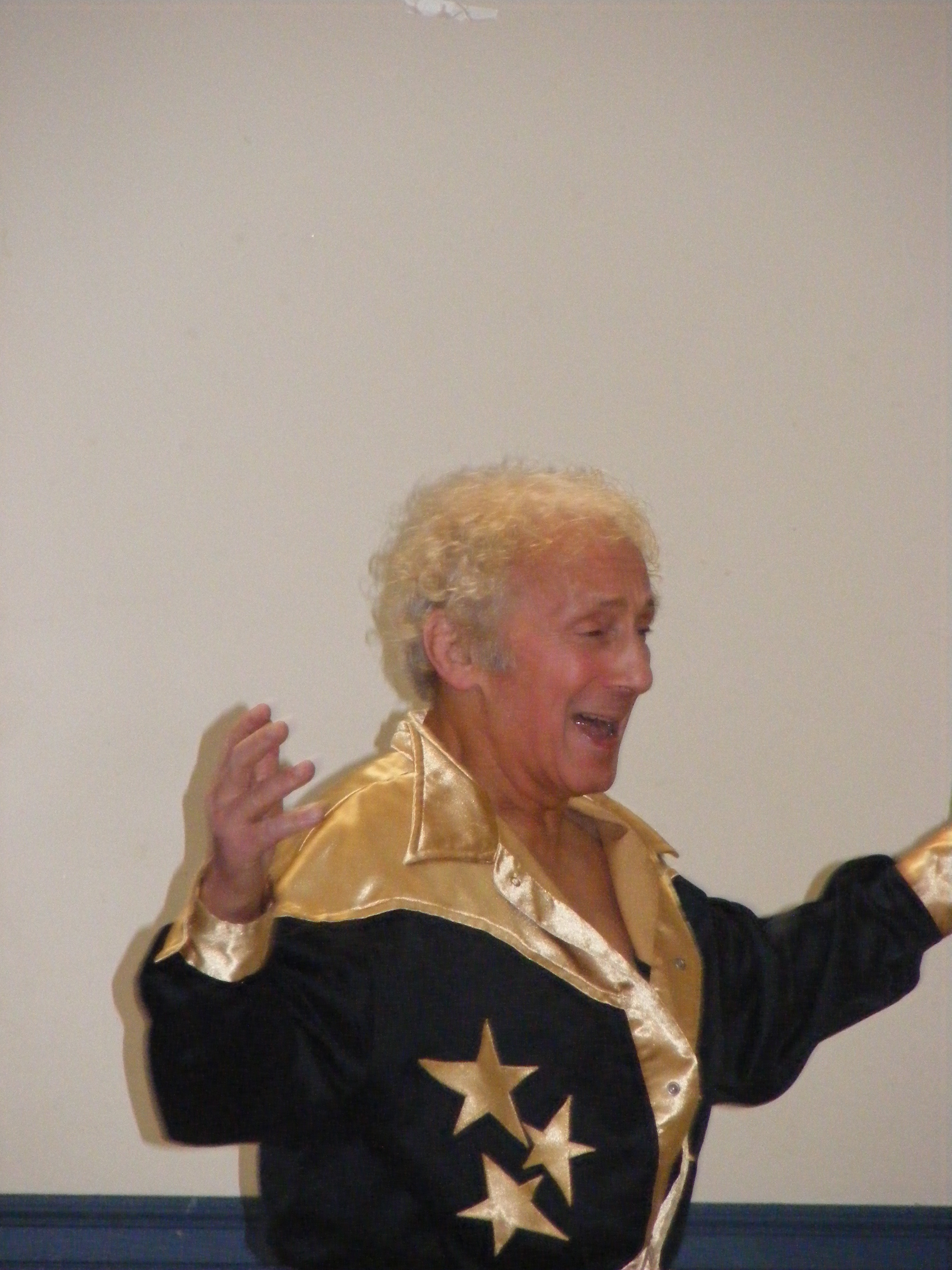

Personal information
- Born: Robert Jason Elowitch; April 8, 1943 Portland, Maine, U.S.
- Died: August 7, 2025 (aged 82)

Professional wrestling career
- Ring name: Robbie Ellis
- Billed height: 5 ft 7 in (1.70 m)
- Billed weight: 180 lb (82 kg)
- Billed from: Portland, Maine
- Trained by: Killer Kowalski; Bill Graham
- Debut: 1966
- Retired: March 22, 2013

Robert Jason Elowitch (April 8, 1943 – August 7, 2025), better known by his ring name, Robbie Ellis, was an American professional wrestler who competed in New England and Mid-Atlantic independent circuit as well as international promotions in Europe. The co-owner of Barridoff Auctions, he was the subject of a Sports Illustrated article as well as considerable television and press coverage from World News Tonight, The Today Show, The Osgood File, The MacNeil/Lehrer News Hour, Time and Again, and MTV's True Life and the National Enquirer.

== Life and career ==
Rob Elowitch was born on April 8, 1943.

In 2000 he started wrestling for Chikara, Innovative Hybrid Wrestling, Showcase Pro Wrestling, No Limit Pro Wrestling, Pro Wrestling America, Pro Wrestling Revolution, Independent Wrestling Entertainment, New England Championship Wrestling, as the grandfather of wrestler Ryan Matthews, and the Millennium Wrestling Federation. From January to November 2007, he went on tour with Italian Championship Wrestling. At age 64, he was the oldest wrestler on the roster.

He is the subject of a feature-length documentary Canvasman: The Robbie Ellis Story directed by Gary Robinov. In 2010, it was an official selection of the Maine Jewish Film Festival, Atlantic City Film and Music Festival, Camden International Film Festival, South Dakota Film Festival, and Cape Ann Film Festivals; and, during 2011, the San Diego and Toronto Jewish Film Festivals, Lewiston Auburn Film Festival, and Portsmouth (NH) Film Festival among others. On May 12, 2011, it was screened on the Maine Public Broadcasting Network preceded by a half hour interview.

In 2014, Ellis returned to Chikara as the promotion's new storyline owner.

Ellis died on August 7, 2025, at the age of 82.

== Championships and accomplishments ==
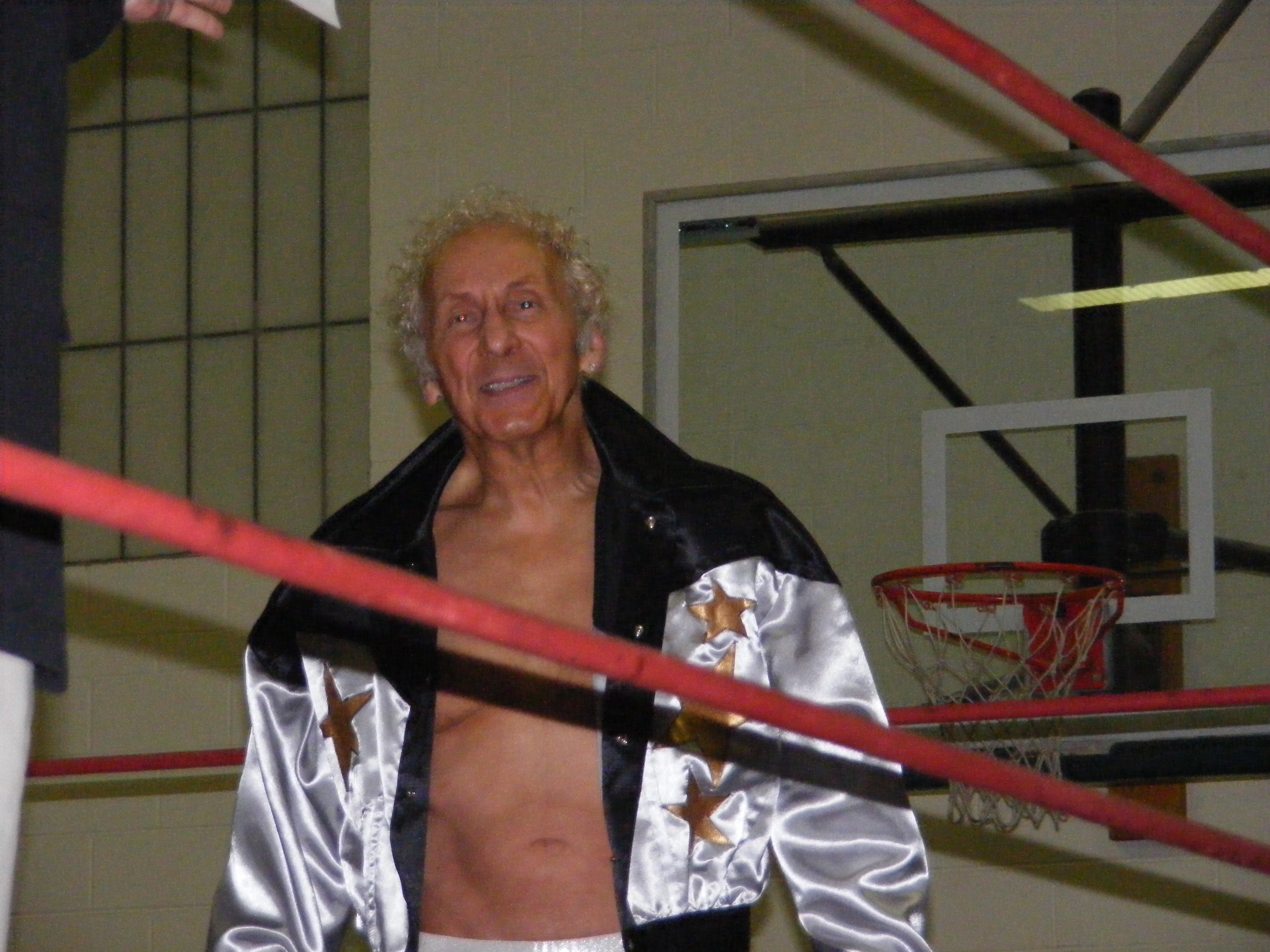
Ellis in 2010

- Coastal Pro Wrestling

- CPW Junior Heavyweight Championship (1 time)

- Eastern Wrestling Alliance

- EWA Light Heavyweight Championship (1 time)

- Green Mountain Wrestling

- GMW World Lightweight Championship (2 times)

- International Championship Wrestling

- ICW Light Heavyweight Championship (3 times)

- Independent Wrestling Entertainment

- IWE International Championship (1 time)

- New England Independent

- Personality of the Year (2005)

- New England Pro Wrestling

- NEPW Junior Heavyweight Championship (1 time)

- New England Pro Wrestling Hall of Fame

- Class of 2008
- Entertainer of the Year (2009)
- Lifetime Achievement Award (2010)

- New Wrestling Horizons

- NWH Cruiserweight Championship (1 time)

- Pro Wrestling Illustrated

- PWI ranked him #441 of the 500 best singles wrestlers of the PWI 500 in 1991 and similar for several other years through 2008

- Ringside Wrestling / World Independent Wrestling

- Ringside Junior Heavyweight Championship (1 time)

- Yankee Pro Wrestling

- YPW Lightweight Championship (1 time)

- Other titles

- AWA North Atlantic Cruiserweight Championship (7 times)
- NAWA Lightweight Championship (1 time)
