= Power League Wrestling =

- Acronym: PLW
- Founded: 1991
- Defunct: 2016
- Style: American Wrestling
- Headquarters: Pawtucket, Rhode Island
- Founder(s): Bob Evans and Mark Amaral
- Owner(s): Mark Amaral, Carlos Arenas, Paul Lauzon, and Tommy Degnan
- Website: Official website

Power League Wrestling (PLW) was an American independent professional wrestling promotion based in Pawtucket, Rhode Island. It was founded in Swansea, Massachusetts by Bob Evans and Mark Amaral in 1991, and later taken over by Amaral, Carlos Arenas, Paul Lauzon, and Tommy Degnan. It was the first and longest-running "indy" promotion in the state of Rhode Island and one of the few successful groups outside the Greater Boston Area.

PLW held wrestling events exclusively for charities and was one of the few professional wrestling promotions to operate as a non-profit organization in the United States. PLW had been praised for its shows to raise money for victims of the September 11 attacks, The Station nightclub fire, and the Boston Marathon bombings.

A number of Northeastern and East Coast-based independent stars had appeared for PLW charity events including "Mr. USA" Tony Atlas, Gino Martino, Claudio Castagnoli, Romeo Roselli, Ken Doane, Robbie Ellis, Hallowicked, Jigsaw, Larry Sweeney, Mike Quackenbush, Shane Storm, Antonio Thomas, and manager Johnny Fabulous. Ariel and Eddie Edwards of Ring of Honor, Rescue 911 Christopher Annino (Wrestler), Michael Sain of Total Nonstop Action Wrestling, and Johnny Curtis of World Wrestling Entertainment all competed in the promotion during their early careers. Former Extreme Championship Wrestling star Spike Dudley, a native of Lincoln, Rhode Island, had made multiple appearances for the promotion. Several PLW alumni had been inducted into the New England Pro Wrestling Hall of Fame since 2008.

== History ==
=== Origins ===
PLW had its origins in 1990 as the "backyarding" Outdoor Wrestling Federation (OWF), which was featured on "Talking Wrestling", a weekly cable access television program, hosted by wrestling journalist Cody Boyns. The final ten minutes of the show would highlight bouts from the promotion. The OWF received its name due to Boyns hosting its earliest events in his own backyard. A wrestling ring was eventually built and the matches were moved indoors to the television studio in 1991.

=== Early years: 1991–1995 ===
Inspired by their time in the OWF, "Brutal" Bob Evans and "Maniacal" Mark Amaral decided to start their own half-hour program with just wrestling matches under the Power League Wrestling banner. The promotion held its first television taping at Joseph G. Luther Elementary School in Swansea, Massachusetts in October 1991. "The Fighter" Joe O. and The Brutal Brigade ("Brutal" Bob Evans and Maniacal Mark) won championship tournaments in November to become the inaugural PLW Heavyweight and Tag Team Champions respectively. Scott Z. was crowned the first-ever PLW New England Champion after winning a tournament at Luther School the following month.

The promotion's weekly half-hour television series was first on Heritage Cable, serving the Swansea area as well as numerous towns in Rhode Island. Evans was the producer of Power League Wrestling TV until he turned his position over to Tommy Degnan in September 1992. Degnan had been producing a "hometown" version of the PLW show on Pawtucket public access the previous month, as Heritage Cable broadcast in only a few select communities, and accepted Evans' offer to oversee the regular show. In addition to becoming PLW's ring announcer, Degnan would remain a key figure in the promotion for many years. Carlos Arenas and Paul Lauzon joined Amaral as co-bookers following Evens departure from the company. The initial quality of the show was described by Degnan as very "bush league" due to budget limitations. The wrestlers performed in a makeshift wooden ring, with the "audience" made up of the other wrestlers, and performed hours of matches in a single night to full up a month's worth of episodes. These shows were shot on location and later edited at the producer's home where voice over commentary was added. Episodes also included recorded interviews and music videos highlighting past matches. Some of their on-air interviews were filmed at T. F. Green Airport and Saint Anne's Hospital.

As the roster was still essentially high school and college age youths, PLW focused on a more comedic style of wrestling rather than presenting itself as a more serious promotion. Many of the early gimmicks and angles were inspired by what was seen in the World Wrestling Federation and World Championship Wrestling at the time. Its television series typically featured humorous commentary and skits. One episode, for example, opened with a Masterpiece Theatre-style reading of Goldilocks and the Three Bears by facepainted wrestler Sub-Zero.

=== Expansion: 1995–1999 ===
In the fall of 1994, PLW became involved in local fundraisers by holding wrestling shows for charity. One of their first events was a benefit show for St. Pius V Church in Providence, Rhode Island on November 13, 1994. Punisher defeated Sub-Zero, substituting for injured champion Scott Z., to win PLW Heavyweight Championship at the event. By 1995, PLW was officially running monthly shows as a not-for-profit organization. Their shows, modeled after the 1980s wrestling boom, used "family friendly" entertainment to raise money for various charity organizations in Southern New England. Although independent promotions are often involved in local fundraisers, neither the PLW promoters or wrestlers performed for money and all of the proceeds, largely from ticket sales, went to the sponsoring charity. Its Power-Fest and Power House Brawl supercards that year went to help the Cranston Martial Arts Studio in Cranston, Rhode Island and St. Pius V Church in Providence, respectively. By this time, thanks in part to Bob Evans and Paul Lauzon, PLW had made contacts with other independent wrestlers from New England allowing a number of regional stars to appear on a semi-regular basis. The promotion also served as an environment where younger wrestlers could learn their craft attracting wrestlers from as far away as New York, New Jersey, and Ontario, Canada. PLW's monthly fundraisers were typically held at the Boys & Girls Club, YMCA, and other local community centers with Fall River, Massachusetts, Sturbridge, Massachusetts, Newport, Rhode Island, and Pawtucket, Rhode Island being its biggest towns.

On January 19, 1997, PLW held a fundraiser entitled "The War In Warren" for Our Lady of Fatima High School in Warren, Rhode Island where Scott Thomas regained the PLW New England title from The Mighty Bosch while "American Eagle" Shane Simons defeated T.J. Richter for the PLW Heavyweight title. The show raised almost $1,000 for the school's athletic program. On March 9, PLW held a benefit show for South Central Rehabilitative Resources, Inc., a housing agency for the handicapped, at Tantasqua Regional High School in Sturbridge, Massachusetts. A benefit show for the Kristen Jorge Memorial Fund two months later at Rogers High School saw PLW Heavyweight Champion Shane Simons surrender the title. Jason the Slasher defeated Amazin' Jay, Bob Evans, Maniacal Mark, "Lethal" Paul Lauzon, and T.J. Richter in that night's main event, a "Pier 6 Brawl", to become the new champion.

On June 21, at Power-Fest 1997 in Pawtucket, "Defenseman" Derek Molhan defeated Jason the Slasher in a Steel Cage match to win the PLW Heavyweight Championship with WALE radio host Cody Boyns as special guest referee. Also on the card, The Knights of the Realm (Daedilus Dimmak & The Mighty Bosch) defeated The Pillars of Power (Sub Zero & The Exterminator) and John 3:16 & Vertabreaker in a Triangle match for the PLW Tag Team titles.

PLW returned to Our Lady of Fatima High School for its year-end Power House Brawl supercard billed as "The War in Warren II". The Pillars of Power regained the PLW Tag Team Championship in a Triangle match with Knights of the Realm and Fryght. The 1997 Power House Brawl was won by Paul Lauzon after eliminating Bob Evans. The main event was later broadcast statewide on public access television.

On May 16, 1998, PLW's Power-Fest 98 was a benefit show for the Woonsocket Police Department's D.A.R.E. program in Woonsocket, Rhode Island. The main event was an interpromotional match between EWA Heavyweight Champion "Mr. USA" Tony Atlas and PLW Heavyweight Champion "Defenseman" Derek Molhan. Atlas was the first major star to be brought into the promotion. The featured match on the undercard was a street fight match between real-life Woonsocket police officers "Dr. Dirty" Marc Dubois and "The Man In Demand" Ed Doura with city councilman Leo Fontaine as special guest referee. The other was Amazin' Jay versus Scott Thomas for the PLW New England Championship, which Jay won by pinfall. The promotion was a part of a benefit event organized by Cody Boyns in Duxbury, Massachusetts the following week. In the main event, Boyns pinned Bob Evans in a singles match. On the undercard, Tiny the Terrible lost to Half Nelson in a midget wrestling match and Crusher Sonny Goodspeed won a battle royal.

"Slammin' for Zachary" was held for Zachary Smith, an 8-year-old boy suffering from epilepsy, at the St. James Parish Center in Manville, Rhode Island on June 13. The proceeds from the event, expected to be between $500–$1,000, went towards purchasing medical equipment (specifically a handicapped-accessible shower stall) for the Smith family home. Justin Credible and Spike Dudley of Extreme Championship Wrestling were in attendance at the event. Additionally, a ten-bell salute was given in honor of Junkyard Dog who had died a few days before the show.

On September 13, "Slammin' to See Through the Smoke" was held at Beatrice Wood School in Plainville, Massachusetts. It was attended by 200 fans and the promotion's most successful show at the time raising a record $1,500. The proceeds went towards purchasing an IRIS thermal imaging system for the town fire department. The main event was a "champion vs. champion" match between PLW Heavyweight Champion Universal Soldier and PLW New England Champion Amazin' Jay that ended in a time-limit draw. A week later PLW returned to Duxbury holding "Wrestling for Ramps 2" at the local high school to raise money for the Duxbury Skate Park.

The "1998 Power House Brawl" was held at Johnson & Wales University on December 13, 1998. It was a benefit show for U.S. Marine Corps' Toys for Tots program. Troy Young defeated Amazin' Jay to win the PLW New England Championship and Derik Destiny won the 1998 Power House Brawl by eliminating Gino Martino. In late-1999, Tommy Degnan brought PLW into a joint promotion called International Independent Wrestling with Mike Biggs' Independent Wrestling Alliance and Anthony Rufo's Unified Championship Wrestling. This venture greatly expanded PLW's territory allowing it to tour throughout Connecticut, Massachusetts, and Rhode Island. PLW pulled out of the project when Mark Amaral and Carlos Arenas wanted to return to running shows full-time.

=== 21st century: 2000–2009 ===
By the start of the 2000s, many of the original members of PLW had retired and the promotion ceased having a "regular" roster. PLW remained a popular destination of the New England independent circuit however. The promotion often had to turn down offers from wrestlers due to the limited number of spots at PLW events. A number of regional stars had been visiting the promotion since its earliest years. Among these were former International World Class Championship Wrestling stars Tony Atlas, Chief Dave Foxx, Robbie Ellis, Gary Apollo, and The Pink Assassin. The latter three wrestlers would become semi-regulars during the next decade. PLW was particularly popular with older veterans as its events allowed them to reunite with old friends. The promotion also showcased talent from Chaotic Wrestling, Century Wrestling Alliance, Eastern Wrestling Alliance, Northeast Championship Wrestling and Yankee Pro Wrestling. Its core group of regular performers included Doink the Clown, Evan Siks, Michael Sain, and Rick Fuller. The promotion eventually made efforts to rotate wrestlers so as to free up spots and introduce newer wrestlers. Future WWE superstars such as Johnny Curtis and Kenn Phoenix also spent their early careers in the promotion.

Power-Fest 2000 took place in Lincoln, Rhode Island on May 21, 2000. The event saw the return of Spike Dudley to PLW where he served as a cornerman to "American Eagle" Shane Simons in his match against Little Guido, a fellow ECW star. After winning the match, Little Guido continued attacking Simons until Dudley entered the ring and took Guido out with a stunner. This was the second time Dudley, a graduate of Lincoln High School, had visited his home state for a PLW charity event. Also on the card both PLW Heavyweight Champion Don Juan de Santo and PLW New England Champion Maniacal Mark successfully defended their titles. On September 16, 2000, at Saint Ann School in Providence, Rhode Island, PLW raised almost $2,000 for the Jalen Noon Coulbourn fire relief fund. The main event was a Triple Threat match for the PLW Heavyweight Championship between champion Don Juan de Santo, Dr. Heresy, and Chris Venom. Heresy won the match, pinning de Santo after a spinning side slam. Two featured bouts were scheduled on the undercard. In a PLW New England Championship match, Maniacal Mark defended his title against Tim Kilgore. The other was a Pier 6 Brawl in which Kid Krazy defeated Gino Giovanni, Hi-Lite Kid, Kash Knight, Little Killer and Vertabreaker to become the first-ever PLW Lightweight Champion. Sub-Zero won a gold medal after winning the Olympic Battle Royal and afterwards presented it to Jalen Noon. Also featured was an intergender match that saw Amanda Storm defeat Jason the Slasher.

PLW gradually began running on a seasonal basis, with monthly shows typically held from April to September, and taking a break during the winter months. In addition to its annual Power-Fest and Power House Brawl supercards, PLW also started the "Great Outdoors Tour" which toured outdoor festivals and venues in southern New England during the summer; its year-end supercard Power House Brawl, however, was held only occasionally after 2001. The promotion experienced lower attendance at its events at times attributed to a lack of advertising on the part of the sponsoring organization. PLW does actively contribute to promoting its events by contacting local media outlets, press releases, and posting flyers in stores, and on their official website, however, the sponsors are usually responsible for advertising. An April 2001 show for a Central Falls boy suffering from muscular dystrophy raised over $1,500, and saw one of its largest turnouts, due to the "aggressive" efforts of the child's family.

On December 30, 2001, Power House Brawl 2001 was held in West Warwick, Rhode Island for the Rhode Island Community Food Bank. On the show "Heavenly" Johnny Angel defeated Dr. Heresy to win the PLW Heavyweight Championship while Elements of Suicide (Cinna and Onyx) beat Mighty Moco and Paul Lauzon, substituting for Jason the Slasher, to regain the PLW Tag Team Championship. Chris Hamrick and The Damned (Draven and Mad Dog) also defeated Edward G. Xtasy, Matt Vandal, and "Protege" Mike Preston in a six-man tag team match. "Lethal" Paul Lauzon won the Power House Brawl, making him the only person to do it twice.

PLW held the Prince of Power tournament in the summer of 2002. It was a 32-man single-elimination tournament that was held in Coventry, Cumberland, Pawtucket, and West Warwick, Rhode Island between June 13 and August 11, 2002. Its participants included Gary Apollo, Johnny Curtis, Kenn Phoenix, G.Q. Smooth, and Matt Storm. Ariel and Mercedes both appeared as valets at the quarterfinals.

One of PLW's most memorable shows was its efforts to raise money for victims of The Station nightclub fire at Power-Fest 2003. PLW had previously visited West Warwick two years earlier and had been invited back by the town several times since then. It was not until the day after the fire that PLW made the decision to return to West Warwick. Although the promotion usually raised money through ticket sales, the show offered free admission with fans making voluntary donations at the door and a raffle that included donations from WHJY and World Wrestling Entertainment. The proceeds went towards WHJY's "Doc Fund" which provided financial assistance to families of the victims as well as a scholarship fund for Rhode Island College. Nine matches took place at the event. In the first co-main event, West Warwick's own Gary Apollo wrestled Dr. Heresy to a time-limit draw for the PLW Heavyweight Championship. Also on the card was a Fatal Four-Way match between Johnny Angel, Kenn Phoenix, Kid Krazy and Revelation for the vacant PLW New England Championship, which Angel won. Matches on the undercard included Robbie Ellis against Irwin Quincy, Billy Kryptonite facing Vince Vicallo. The second co-main event was a 6-man tag team match between real-life Warwick police officers Team O.I.C. (Lt. Rick Ramsay, Sgt. Jim Tiernan, and Sgt. Fred Araujo) and Paul Lauzon & The Perfect Ten (Mr. Wrestling IV, Mr. Wrestling VI).

On May 2, 2004, Power-Fest 2004 was held at Saint Edwards School in Brockton, Massachusetts. The event served as a memorial show to Jarrod Drew, who had been killed by a drunk driver on I-495, with the proceeds going to a memorial fund in his name. Ten matches took place at the event. There were two main events. The first was a match for the PLW Heavyweight Championship between then-champion Dr. Heresy and Derik Destiny, which Destiny won. The second and final match of the event was the Triple Threat match for the PLW Tag Team Championship. X-Foundation (Duke Maximum and Ryan Waters) retained the title against Mike Bennett & Dominic "Dice" Gambino and The McGraws (Huey McGraw and Woody McGraw). Waters, who was the younger brother of Jarrod Drew, addressed his hometown at the end of the match. The entire PLW locker room came out to show their support for Ryan during the emotional speech. That year's PowerFest raised over $2000 and was, at that point, the most successful PLW benefit show in the promotion's history.

Another PLW show on June 18 featured a singles match between Triplelicious and Evan Siks as well as Eastern Wrestling Alliance stars Clinicly Inclined (Andre Lyonz and Dr. Heresy) winning the EWA Tag Team Championship from The Heartbreakers (Antonio Thomas and Johnny Heartbreaker). On September 26, 2004, PLW returned to West Warwick for another Station nightclub fire benefit show to help build a permanent memorial for the victims at the site of the fire. The main event was a mixed tag team match between Alex and Heidi Payne against PLW Heavyweight Champion Derik Destiny and Gina Marie, which the Paynes won. One of the featured bouts was a "grudge match" between Warwick police officer Rick Ramsay and Paul Lauzon. The event also featured stars from Chikara holding a lucha libre-style exhibition bout with Mike Quackenbush, Shane Storm, and Jigsaw defeating Larry Sweeney, Claudio Castagnoli and Hallowicked in a 6-man tag team match.

PLW brought back Power House Brawl on December 17, 2006. The winter supercard was dedicated to Kyle Knowles, a West Warwick teen who was killed in an automobile accident two months earlier, with the proceeds going to a scholarship in his name. The main event was a PLW Heavyweight Championship match where champion Jason the Slasher defeated Chris Blackheart by disqualification. Matches on the undercard were T.J. Richter versus Duke Maximum for the PLW New England Championship, Gary Apollo versus The Pink Assassin, and Nick Steel, Sonny Goodspeed, and DJ Baron versus Dr. Heresy, Kid Krazy, and Chris Venom in a 6-man tag team match. Extreme Heat (AK Fuego & Kid Pyro) successfully defended the PLW Tag Team Championship against The Kreeper and Iraqnid (with Taeler and The Kreep). Chris Blackheart eliminated Shane Simons to win the 2006 Power House Brawl. On May 20, 2007, PLW returned to West Warwick yet again for Power-Fest 2007. Chris Blackheart defeated Jason the Slasher to win PLW Heavyweight Championship in the main event. The undercard also featured Dr. Heresy and Kid Krazy beating Chi Chi Cruz and Eric Dylan in a tag team match. Tony Atlas too made a special appearance to thank the fans in attendance.

In the summer of 2007, PLW held its first annual "Great Outdoors Tour". On June 3, PLW appeared at the South Attleboro Lions Club Appreciation Festival in South Attleboro, Massachusetts where they were "a big hit with the children" according to The Sun Chronicle. Two weeks later, PLW held a benefit show for Cumberland High School teacher Donna D'Arezzo who had sustained serious injuries in a car accident. The Prince of Power Tournament was brought back as a one-night 12-man single-elimination tournament. Don Vega defeated Derek Molhan and Kid Krazy in a Triple Threat match to win the tournament. In July 2007, PLW made its first appearance at the annual East Providence Heritage Festival at Pierce Memorial Field in East Providence, Rhode Island. One of the featured bouts was a singles match between Eddie Edwards and Rick Fuller. A rematch between the two men took place at a PLW benefit show in East Freetown, Massachusetts on July 27, 2007. Firecat and The Baker Boys (Brickhouse and David Baker) against T.J. Richter and Sick & Twisted (Evan Siks and Matt Storm) also defeated T.J. Richter and Sick & Twisted (Evan Siks and Matt Storm) in a 6-man tag team match.

Power-Fest 2008 was a benefit show for the West Warwick Police Department's explorer program. The show featured a heavyweight title match between champion Chris Blackheart and Don Vega, which Vega won, and a 6-man tag team match between Gary Apollo, Amazin' Jay, and Derek Molhan against The Pink Assassin, Maniacal Mark, and Mr. Wrestling IV. Power-Fest 2009 was held at Jenks Junior High School for the Pawtucket Fire Fighters "Fill the Boot" campaign to benefit the Muscular Dystrophy Association. Pawtucket's Bravest, composed of real-life Pawtucket fire fighters Jamie Pike and Jeff Johnson, defeated The Perfect Ten (Mr. Wrestling IV and Mr. Wrestling VI), accompanied by Paul Lauzon, in the main event. Other featured matches included Alex Payne, also with Lauzon, defeating Derek Molhan in a Ladder match to win the PLW New England Championship. Matt Storm and Mr. Munroe, with manager Rich Bass, defeated The Air Devils (Brandon Webb and Anthony Stone), The Baker Boys (Brickhouse and David Baker), and Impact Inc. (Jose Perez and Kevin Karizma) in a Fatal Four-Way match to win the then vacant PLW Tag Team Championship. The 2009 Great Outdoors Tour visited at Cumberlandfest, the East Providence Heritage Festival, Lions Club Festival, and the Nathanael Greene School.

=== Recent years: 2010–2016 ===
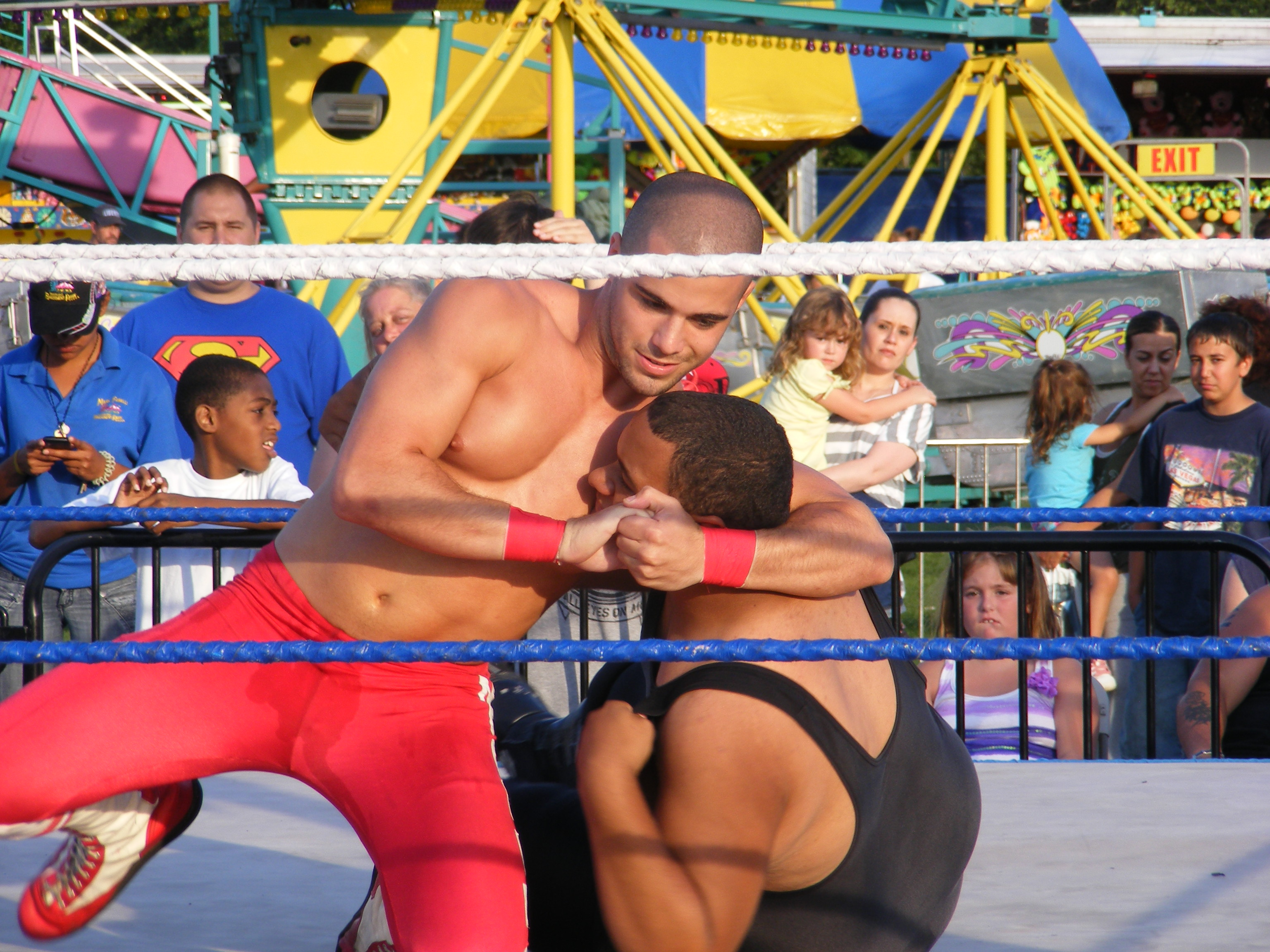
Matt Magnum wrestles "Shady" Shay Silva in East Providence, Rhode Island during Power League Wrestling's "2011 Great Outdoors Tour".

On April 17, 2011, PLW's benefit show for the St. Elizabeth Ann Seton Academy had Seton Academy teacher Paul Olson and Paul Lauzon wrestling Carlos Arenas and Dr. Heresy in the main event. Other featured matches included Doink the Clown versus Buddy Romano, Dangerous Danny Davis against Mr. Wrestling VI, and a Triple Threat match involving J.T. Fox, Vinny Marseglia and Zack Static. On May 22, nearly 15 years after the "War on Warren" shows, Our Lady of Fatima High School was once again the venue for a PLW event, this time it was Power-Fest 2011. The show opened with a moment of silence and traditional ten-bell salute in memory of "Macho Man" Randy Savage who died in a car accident two days earlier. Paul Lauzon and Paul Olson, accompanied by special guest manager John Cena, Sr., defeated Shane Simons and T.J. Richter in the main event. The Crimson Dynamos (Zack Static and Doug Summers) also defended the EWA Tag Team Championship against Dr. Heresy and Golden Burke.

PLW's first stop during its 2011 Great Outdoors Tour was at the East Providence Heritage Festival on July 17. The tour's final stop was in Plainville, Massachusetts for the Lions Fall Festival in Telford Park on September 25, 2011. The main event was a match between "Sensational" Scott Levesque and "English Lion" Eddie Ryan, a visiting British wrestler from 4 Front Wrestling, for the vacant PLW Heavyweight Championship.

Power-Fest 2012 was a benefit show for Pawtcket's Fairlawn Little League Complex on June 8, 2012. The event featured a "champion vs. champion" bout between PLW Heavyweight Champion Scott Levesque and PLW New England Champion Nicholas Night, which Night won via disqualification. Matt Storm & T.J. Richter (with Rich Bass) defeated Uncle Ulysses and Mini McGraw to win the PLW Tag Team Championship. That year's Great Outdoors Tour visited Cumberlandfest 2012, Lees Pond Park Festival, and Lions Fall Festival. Their appearance at the East Providence Heritage Festival was covered by The Providence Journal.

In the aftermath of the Boston Marathon bombing, PLW held a benefit show for The One Fund Boston at Power-Fest 2013. The event took place at Saint Raphael Academy's Alumni Hall in Pawtucket on May 19, 2013. For the first time on a Power-Fest card, all three of the major PLW championship titles changed hands that night. One of the featured bouts was a 6-man tag team match between Shane Douglas, Nick Steel, and Frankie Vain against Gregory Edwards, Ryan Waters, and Mark Shurman. On July 21, 2013, in East Providence, Rhode Island, during PLW's annual Great Outdoors tour that year, Antonio Thomas defeated Gregory Edwards at Pierce Field with Kenny Dykstra as special guest referee.

On June 8, 2014, PLW's Power-Fest 2014 was held at the Jack-Gem Ranch in North Smithfield, Rhode Island as a benefit show for the American Cancer Society's Relay for Life. The main event match saw PLW Heavyweight Champion "Mad Dog" Matt Storm defeat PLW New England Champion "Reflex" Eric Dylan in a "champion vs. champion" match. On the undercard, "The Juice" J. T. Dunn, accompanied by former WWE wrestler Shelly Martinez, defeated "H2O" Ryan Waters in a standard wrestling match. Also featured was a match between Evan Siks and "Shady" Shay Cash, which Siks won.

The promotion have not held another event since August 2015.

== Charity work ==
Since 1994, Power League Wrestling has held events for over 50 different charities in Southern New England. The promotion was personally thanked by Rhode Island Governor Lincoln Almond and Pawtucket mayor James Doyle, for their involvement in the "RI Remembers Sept. 11th Fund" and the Pawtucket Fire Relief Fund respectively, as well as from the Rhode Island Foundation and 94HJY when PLW's annual Power-Fest supercard was held as a benefit show for The Doc Fund in May 2003. In addition, it has received recommendation letters from Cumberlandfest organizer Frank Geary and the West Warwick Police Department. Notable charity and benefit shows have included:

Event	Date	Venue	City	Notes
Power-Fest 95	June 24, 1995	Cranston Martial Arts Studio	Cranston, Rhode Island	Fundraiser for Cranston Martial Arts Studio's youth boxing program.
Power House Brawl (1995)	December 10, 1995	St. Pius V's Church	Providence, Rhode Island	Fundraiser for St. Pius V's Church's gym fund.
Power-Fest 96	June 28, 1996	Joseph Jenks, Jr. High School	Pawtucket, Rhode Island	Fundraiser for Pawtucket's July 3 Fireworks Fund.
A Lift for Nicky	September 29, 1996	Saint James Parish Center	Manville, Rhode Island	Fundraiser for a disabled boy, Nicholas Valois, to pay for a wheelchair lift.
Power House Brawl (1996)	December 8, 1996	Community Center	Central Falls, Rhode Island	Fundraiser for DARE.
The War In Warren	January 19, 1997	Our Lady of Fatima High School	Warren, Rhode Island	Fundraiser for Our Lady of Fatima High School's athletic program.
Power-Fest 97	June 21, 1997	Joseph Jenks, Jr. High School	Pawtucket, Rhode Island	Fundraiser for Pawtucket's July 3 Fireworks Fund.
Power House Brawl (1997)	November 23, 1997	Our Lady of Fatima High School	Warren, Rhode Island	Fundraiser for Our Lady of Fatima High School's athletic program.
Six-Man Struggle (1998)	January 18, 1998	St. Anthony's Parish Center	Pawtucket, Rhode Island	Fundraiser for St. Anthony Church Youth Group.
Boys & Girls Club Benefit Show	April 25, 1998	Thomas Chew Memorial Boys & Girls Club	Fall River, Massachusetts	Fundraiser for the Boys & Girls Club.
Power-Fest 98	May 16, 1998	Woonsocket High School	Woonsocket, Rhode Island	Fundraiser for DARE.
Wrestling for Ramps 2	September 19, 1998	Duxbury High School	Duxbury, Massachusetts	Fundraiser for the Duxbury Skate Park.
imPossible Dream Benefit Show	November 1, 1998	imPossible Dream Hall	Warwick, Rhode Island	Fundraiser for The imPossible Dream Foundation, a charity similar to the Make-A-Wish Foundation, that works to grant the wishes of seriously ill and disabled children.
Power House Brawl (1998)	December 13, 1998	Johnson & Wales University	Providence, Rhode Island	Fundraiser for the United States Marine Corps "Toys for Tots program.
Natasha Puerta Benefit Show	February 5, 1999	Veterans Memorial Elementary School	Central Falls, Rhode Island	Fundraiser for Natasha Puerta, an 8-year-old girl in need of a small intestine transplant, went to pay for the Puertas' family's travel expenses to the University of Nebraska Medical Center for a transplant operation.
Six-Man Struggle (1999)	February 21, 1999	Beatrice Wood School	Plainville, Massachusetts	Fundraiser for the Friends of the Plainville Fire Department.
Power-Fest 1999	May 16, 1999	William H. Thayer Arena	Warwick, Rhode Island	Fundraiser for the J. Arthur Trudeau Memorial Center.
Power-Fest 2000	May 21, 2000	Lincoln High School	Lincoln, Rhode Island	Fundraiser for Katie Burton, Lincoln High School's representative in the "People to People" ambassador program.
Jalen Noon-Coulbourn Benefit Show	September 16, 2000	Saint Ann School	Providence, Rhode Island	Fundraiser for Jalen Noon-Coulbourn Fire Relief fund.
Power House Brawl (2000)	December 10, 2000	St. Theresa Church	Attleboro, Massachusetts	Fundraiser for the St. Theresa Church Christmas charity program.
Power-Fest 2001	May 20, 2001	St. Raphael Academy	Pawtucket, Rhode Island	Fundraiser for Saint Raphael Academy's athletic department.
Power House Brawl (2001)	December 30, 2001	Civic Center	West Warwick, Rhode Island	Fundraiser for the Rhode Island Community Food Bank.
Power-Fest 2002	May 19, 2002	Central Falls High School	Central Falls, Rhode Island	Fundraiser for the Rhode Island Remembers Sept. 11th Fund, a project first proposed by Gov. Lincoln Almond, to raise money for the construction of a permanent Sept. 11 memorial at the Rhode Island State House.
Power-Fest 2003	May 18, 2003	Civic Center	West Warwick, Rhode Island	Fundraiser for 94HJY's The Doc Fund, named in honor of disc jockey Michael "The Doctor" Gonsalves, for families affected by the Station nightclub fire.
Power House Brawl (2003)	December 21, 2003	St. Raphael Academy	Pawtucket, Rhode Island	Fundraiser for the Pawtucket Fire Relief Fund, established by then Mayor James Doyle to assist victims of the Greenhalgh Mill fire.
Station Fire Memorial Fund Benefit Show	September 26, 2004	Civic Coliseum	West Warwick, Rhode Island	Fundraiser for the Station Fire Memorial Foundation.
Power House Brawl (2006)	December 17, 2006	West Warwick High School	West Warwick, Rhode Island	Fundraiser for the Kyle Knowles Memorial Scholarship Fund.
Power-Fest 2007	May 20, 2007	Civic Center	West Warwick, Rhode Island	Fundraiser for the West Warwick Police Explorers program.
Prince of Power (2007)	June 16, 2007	Cumberland Hill School	Cumberland, Rhode Island	Fundraiser for Cumberland Hill art teacher Donna D'Arezzo who was seriously injured in a car accident.
Power-Fest 2008	May 4, 2008	Civic Center	West Warwick, Rhode Island	Fundraiser for the West Warwick Police Explorers program.
Power-Fest 2009	May 31, 2009	Civic Coliseum	Pawtucket, Rhode Island	Fundraiser for the Muscular Dystrophy Association.

== Championships ==
=== Defunct championships ===
Championship	Notes
PLW Heavyweight Championship	The heavyweight title of Power League Wrestling.
PLW Tag Team Championship	The tag team title of Power League Wrestling.
PLW New England Championship	The secondary title for singles competition.
PLW European Heavyweight Championship	The title was established in 1991 and was defended until 1994.
PLW European Tag Team Championship	The title was established in 1993 and was defended until 1994.
PLW Lightweight Championship	The lightweight title of Power League Wrestling. It was established in 2000 and continued to be defended until 2004.

=== Programming ===
Programming	Notes
Power League Wrestling	(1991–1995) Syndicated, broadcast on cable access.
