= PLW New England Championship =

Professional wrestling championship

Details
- Promotion: Power League Wrestling
- Date established: December 16, 1991
Statistics
- First champion: Scott Z.
- Most reigns: Maniacal Mark (3)
- Longest reign: Nicholas Night (966 days)
- Shortest reign: Shane Simons (35 days)

The PLW New England Championship is a professional wrestling championship in Power League Wrestling (PLW). It is the second most important championship in the promotion, after the PLW Heavyweight Championship.

Overall, there have been 34 reigns shared between 29 wrestlers with eleven vacancies. The inaugural champion was Scott Z., who defeated "Ruthless" Ryan Amaral in a tournament final on December 16, 1991 to become the first PLW New England Champion. Maniacal Mark holds the record for most reigns, with three. At 966 days, Nicholas Night's first and only reign is the longest in the title's history. Shane Simons's only reign was the shortest in the history of the title holding it for only 35 days. Only four men in history have held the championship for a continuous reign of one year (365 days) or more. They are Scott Thomas, Nicholas Night, Eric Dylan, and Keanu.

== Title history ==
Key

#	Order in reign history
Reign	The reign number for the specific set of wrestlers listed
Event	The event in which the title was won
—	Used for vacated reigns so as not to count it as an official reign
N/A	The information is not available or is unknown
+	Indicates the current reign is changing daily

=== Reigns ===
As of January 1, 2016

#	Wrestlers	Reign	Date	Days held	Location	Event	Notes	Ref
1	Scott Z.	1	December 16, 1991	98	Swansea, Massachusetts	Power League Wrestling	Scott Z. defeated "Ruthless" Ryan Amaral in a tournament final to become the first PLW New England Champion. Aired in December 1991 on tape delay.	
2	Joe O.	1	March 9, 1992	168	Swansea, Massachusetts	Power League Wrestling	The Shadow Warrior substituted for Scott Z.	
3	The Agent	1	August 24, 1992	N/A	Swansea, Massachusetts	Power League Wrestling		
—	Vacated	—	1992	—	—	Power League Wrestling	The Agent was stripped of the championship after a series of attacks on "Brutal" Bob Evans.	
4	Maniacal Mark	1	September 27, 1992	129	Pawtucket, Rhode Island	Power League Wrestling		
5	Shane Simons	1	February 3, 1993	35	Swansea, Massachusetts	Power League Wrestling		
6	Dutch Davidson	1	March 10, 1993	46	Swansea, Massachusetts	Power League Wrestling		
7	Shane Simons	2	April 25, 1993	105	Pawtucket, Rhode Island	Power League Wrestling		
8	Jay A.	1	August 8, 1993	N/A	Pawtucket, Rhode Island	Power League Wrestling		
—	Vacated	—	April 1994	—	—	Power League Wrestling	Jay A. was stripped of the title for excessive foul language and obscene gestures towards PLW fans, officials and wrestlers.	
9	Dutch Davidson	1	May 22, 1994	N/A	Pawtucket, Rhode Island	PowerFest (1994)	Dutch Davidson defeated The Macho Kid in a tournament final to win the vacant title.	
—	Vacated	—	October 1994	—	—	Power League Wrestling	Dutch Davidson surrendered the title upon enlisting in the United States Army.	
10	Maniacal Mark	2	October 9, 1994	N/A	Cranston, Rhode Island	Midnight Madness (1994)	Maniacal Mark defeated The Punisher in a tournament final to win the vacant title.	
11	The Macho Kid	1	July 1995	N/A	Cranston, Rhode Island	Power League Wrestling		
—	Vacated	—	November 1995	—	—	Power League Wrestling	The Macho Kid surrendered the title due to injury.	
12	Max Knight	1	December 10, 1995	182	Providence, Rhode Island	Power-House Brawl (1995)	Max Knight was awarded the vacant title after winning the 1995 Power-House Brawl.	
13	The Macho Kid	2	June 9, 1996	112	North Providence, Rhode Island	Live event		
14	Scott Thomas	1	September 29, 1996	70	Manville, Rhode Island	A Lift For Nicky		
15	The Mighty Bosch	1	December 8, 1996	42	Central Falls, Rhode Island	Power-House Brawl (1996)		
16	Scott Thomas	2	January 19, 1997	482	Warren, Rhode Island	The War In Warren		
17	Amazin' Jay	1	May 16, 1998	211	Woonsocket, Rhode Island	PowerFest (1998)		
18	Troy Young	1	December 13, 1998	N/A	Providence, Rhode Island	Power-House Brawl (1998)		
—	Vacated	—	May 1999	—	—	N/A	Troy Young surrendered the title due to injury.	
19	Dr. Heresy	1	May 16, 1999	146	Warwick, Rhode Island	PowerFest (1999)	Dr. Heresy defeated T.J. Richter in a tournament final to win the vacant title.	
20	Draven	1	October 9, 1999	N/A	Pawtucket, Rhode Island	Live event		
21	Maniacal Mark	3	March 2000	N/A	N/A	N/A	Maniacal Mark received the PLW New England Championship from Draven for his half of the PLW Tag Team Championship.	
22	Derik Destiny	1	October 29, 2000	N/A	Scituate, Rhode Island	Live event		
—	Vacated	—	April 2001	—	—	N/A	Derik Destiny surrendered the championship due to injury.	
23	Chris Blackheart	1	May 20, 2001	364	Pawtucket, Rhode Island	PowerFest (2001)	Chris Blackheart defeated Johnny Angel in a tournament final to win the vacant title.	
24	Johnny Curtis	1	May 19, 2002	N/A	Central Falls, Rhode Island	PowerFest (2002)		
—	Vacated	—	May 2003	—	—	N/A		
25	Johnny Angel	1	May 18, 2003	N/A	West Warwick, Rhode Island	PowerFest (2003)	Johnny Angel defeated Kenn Phoenix, Kid Krazy, and Revelation in a Fatal Fourway match to win vacant title.	
—	Vacated	—	2003	—	—	N/A	Angel was stripped of the championship upon leaving the promotion.	
26	Kid Krazy	1	August 8, 2004	N/A	Cumberland, Rhode Island	Cumberlandfest (2004)	Kid Krazy defeated Jose Perez in a singles match to win the vacant title; both men had won separate Fatal Four-Way matches to determine the number one contenders earlier that day.	
—	Vacated	—	June 2006	—	—	N/A	The championship is vacated due to inactivity.	
27	Duke Maximum	1	June 11, 2006	189	Warwick, Rhode Island	PowerFest (2006)	Duke Maximum defeated T.J. Richter in a singles match to win the vacant title.	
28	T.J. Richter	1	December 17, 2006	271	West Warwick, Rhode Island	Power-House Brawl (2006)		
29	Triplelicious	1	September 14, 2007	N/A	Pawtucket, Rhode Island	Great Outdoors Tour (2007)		
—	Vacated	—	June 2008	—	—	N/A	The championship is vacated after Triplelicious leaves the promotion.	
30	Derek Molhan	1	June 22, 2008	343	South Attleboro, Massachusetts	Great Outdoors Tour (2008)	Derek Molhan defeated Alex Payne, Chris Blackheart, Matt Storm, and Nicholas Knight in a Pier 5 Brawl match.	
31	Alex Payne	1	May 31, 2009	N/A	Pawtucket, Rhode Island	PowerFest (2010)	This was a ladder match.	
—	Vacated	—	August 2010	—	—	N/A	Alex Payne surrendered the title due to injury.	
32	Nicholas Night	1	September 26, 2010	966	Plainville, Massachusetts	Great Outdoors Tour (2010)	Nicholas Night defeated Scott Levesque in a tournament final to win the vacant title.	
33	Eric Dylan	1	May 19, 2013	448	Pawtucket, Rhode Island	PowerFest (2013)		
34	Keanu	1	August 10, 2014	509	Cumberland, Rhode Island	Cumberlandfest (2014)		

== List of combined reigns ==
As of April 22, 2016.

Symbol	Meaning
(-)	The reign is shorter than one day.

Rank	Wrestler	No. of reigns	Combined days
1	Nicholas Night	1	966
2	Keanu	1	621+
3	Scott Thomas	2	552
4	Eric Dylan	1	448
5	Chris Blackheart	1	364
6	Derek Molhan	1	343
7	T.J. Richter	1	271
8	Amazin' Jay	1	211
9	Duke Maximum	1	189
10	Max Knight	1	182
11	Joe O.	1	168
12	Dr. Heresy	1	146
13	Shane Simons	2	140
14	Maniacal Mark	3	>129
15	The Macho Kid	2	>112
16	Scott Z.	1	98
17	Dutch Davidson	2	46
18	The Mighty Bosch	1	42
