= Dr. Heresy =

American professional wrestler

Personal information
- Born: Jeremy Barron; September 25, 1976 (age 50) Nova Scotia, Canada

Professional wrestling career
- Ring name(s): Dr. Heresy; Dr. Reginald Heresy
- Billed height: 6 ft 0 in (1.83 m)
- Billed weight: 224 lb (102 kg)
- Billed from: Bethesda Naval Hospital
- Trained by: Rick Silver
- Debut: November 1996 (as manager); November 23, 1997 (as wrestler)

Jeremy Barron (born September 25, 1976), better known by the ring name Dr. Reginald Heresy, is an American semi-retired professional wrestler, manager, promoter, and trainer. A mainstay of the New England independent circuit, Barron has wrestled in the East Coast, Midwestern, and Southeastern United States since his debut in 1996.

Barron started his professional wrestling career in Power League Wrestling (PLW), where he held the PLW Heavyweight Championship two times and the New England Championship once. From 1997 to 2001, he was part of Mind Over Matter with Don Juan DeSanto, winning tag team titles in several Northeastern promotions, until DeSanto's retirement. Barron was also a top star in the Eastern Wrestling Alliance winning the EWA Heavyweight Championship and the EWA Tag Team Championship (with Maverick Wild as the "New" Mind Over Matter). He and Wild were co-owners of the EWA for a brief period. Barron has also wrestled for Assault Championship Wrestling, Chaotic Wrestling, Front Row Wrestling, New England Championship Wrestling, Northeast Championship Wrestling, PWF Northeast, and Yankee Pro Wrestling.

During the early-2000s, Barron gained national attention for his work in IPW Hardcore and NWA Wildside in addition to stints in Jersey All Pro Wrestling, National Wrestling League and Phoenix Championship Wrestling. Barron also made a one-time appearance with other New England indy stars in NWA: Total Nonstop Action. In 2010, he was inducted into the New England Pro Wrestling Hall of Fame.

== Early life ==
Barron was born in Canada. He attended Rutgers University for a year before transferring to Clark University where he received a Bachelor of Arts in sociology. After moving back to his home state, Barron found employment in the human services industry. He eventually became a manager for a company that provides support for developmentally delayed adults.

== Professional wrestling career ==
=== Early career ===
Barron was first exposed to independent wrestling while a student at Rutgers. He became friends with a classmate, future Jersey All Pro Wrestling star Rick Silver, though the rec.sport.pro-wrestling mailing list. Barron actively became involved in the business after returning to Massachusetts when a co-worker agreed to fill in for another wrestler on a local indy promotion. He spent a year as a manager on the local independent circuit before eventually deciding to become an in-ring performer. It was during this period that Barron developed the in-ring persona of Dr. Reginald Heresy, a sinister psychologist from the Bethesda Naval Hospital. He started working out 3 to 4 days a week at Unified Championship Wrestling's training center in Central Falls, Rhode Island. Barron described the training as "very rough" and students practiced in a boxing ring for sparring rather than a traditional wrestling ring.

=== Power League Wrestling (1996–2000) ===
On November 23, 1997, Barron made his pro debut against El Chubracabra at Power League Wrestling's annual "Power House Brawl". Initially appearing as the psychiatrist of John 3:16 (who later changed his identity to Don Juan de Santo), Dr. Heresy established himself as a formidable wrestler in his own right. The two men were recruited by the Apocalypse Throng then including Maniacal Mark and manager Aristotle. On January 18, 1998, Heresy joined Apocalypse Throng members John 3:16 and Maniacal Mark against New Era Pro (T.J. Richter, Vertabreaker and Derik Destiny) at PLW's "Six-Man Struggle 1998". Heresy was the first man eliminated, however, Apocalypse Throng ended up winning the match with John 3:16 as the team's sole survivor. At Power-Fest 98, Heresy took part in a 12-man battle royal. He lasted 6 minutes and 30 seconds before being eliminated by Exterminator. Heresy met Exterminator's tag team partner Sub-Zero at the PLW benefit show "Slammin' for Zachary" in Manville, Rhode Island on June 13, 1998 (Sub-Zero pinned Heresy by using a clipboard Don Juan de Santo had tossed to his partner). He defeated Scott Thomas at "Power-House Brawl 1998". Later on, Heresy was the sixth entrant in the Power-House Brawl match and was eventually eliminated by Exterminator and Sub-Zero.

On January 23, 1999, Heresy received his first title shot in PLW against Troy Young for the PLW New England Championship. Two weeks later, he substituted for Maniacal Mark in a PLW Tag Team Championship title defense against The Pillars of Power (Exterminator and Sub-Zero), which Heresy and Don Juan de Santo lost. Heresy and Don Juan de Santo would later meet Sub-Zero at Six-Man Struggle 1999 where the "Apocalypse Throng" faced the "Flawless Foundation". Heresy pinned both Scott Thomas and Steamroller to win the match (Sub-Zero was eliminated via count-out). On May 16, Heresy won the vacant PLW New England Championship, his first title in PLW, by defeating T.J. Richter in a tournament final at "Power-Fest 1999". After a five-month title reign, he lost the title to Draven in Pawtucket, Rhode Island on October 9. On November 13, 1999, Heresy and Don Juan DeSanto traveled to State College, Pennsylvania where they lost to Fumar and Rick Silver in a match to crown the Nittany Wrestling Federation's first tag team champions.

Heresy suffered a series of concussions in January 2000. He considered retirement but decided to take three months off to recover from his injuries. At Power-Fest 2000, Heresy teamed with Joe Rules to defeat Rick Silver and Chris Venom. On June 16, he unsuccessfully challenged Don Juan de Santo in a match for the PLW Heavyweight Championship. Heresy won the title from de Santo in a Triple Threat match with Chris Venom at the "Jalen Noon-Coulbourn Benefit Show" in Providence three months later. Heresy's first heavyweight championship reign lasted for well over a year.

=== Independent circuit (2000–2001) ===
Heresy also wrestled for other New England–based promotions while working for PLW including Big East Wrestling, Mayhem Independent Wrestling, Northeast Championship Wrestling, Primal Conflict Wrestling, PWF Northeast, and the United Wrestling Federation. Heresy also wrestled for South Coast Championship Wrestling in New Bedford, Massachusetts. He won the promotion's heavyweight championship from Iron Fist on June 9, 2000. Two days later, Heresy took on Brutus "The Barber" Beefcake. He traded the belt with Johnny Angel over the summer before losing the title to Don Juan DeSanto in Fall River, Massachusetts six months later. In the fall of 2000, he wrestled at several shows for Main Event Wrestling in St. Albans, Vermont. Among these was an interpromotional event with the New England Wrestling Federation, a longtime regional indy promotion, that served as the NEWF's farewell show. Heresy wrestled Mike Paiva on the undercard; his opponent later called this bout as the toughest match of his career. On October 7, 2000, Heresy and de Santo wrestled WWE Hall of Fameer King Kong Bundy in a handicap match.

On January 26, 2001, Mind and Matter were eliminated by Damian Houston and Steve Ramsey in a qualifying match for the EWA Tag Team Championship. The winning team was to earn a spot in a Triple Threat match against then champions Adam Hastey and Alexander Worthington III. The following night, Heresy returned to SCCW for a house show in Pembroke, Massachusetts where he wrestled Tatanka in the double main event. Don Juan DeSanto retired that same year and Heresy formed the "New" Mind and Matter with Adam Booker. He and Booker were defeated by DeSanto and Mad Dog at a PLW show in Cranston, Rhode Island on April 29. On July 14, Heresy was awarded the SCCW Heavyweight Championship when Booker, his tag team partner and then reigning champion, was unable to arrive for a scheduled title defense in Stoughton, Massachusetts against Johnny Angel. The title match went forward as planned with Heresy dropping the title to Johnny Angel. Heresy helped Booker regain the title when they defeated Angel and Ariel in Fall River a week later.

=== The Journeyman Years (2001–2002) ===
"Dr. Heresy is one of my favorite indy wrestlers in the nation right now. You don't hear as much about him as you do guys like A.J. Styles, Low Ki, or The Amazing Red, but as far as being the total package, I think Heresy is right up with many of the "indy superstars" of today. He understands how to be a heel as well as anyone I've ever seen, and can work a crowd better than the vast majority of the guys out there today."

— Chad Murphy, Pro Wrestling Torch (2003)

After befriending Chris Hamrick in June 2001, Heresy was encouraged to begin competing outside the New England region. In his first six months, Heresy appeared for the East Coast Wrestling Alliance and Nittany Valley Wrestling in Pennsylvania, NWA Wildside in Georgia, and In Your Face Pro Wrestling in West Virginia. He soon became a regular for Ron Niemi's IPW Hardcore promotion in St. Petersburg, Florida. Although typically a "heel performer" in New England, Heresy wrestled as a fan favorite in Florida.

On February 23, 2002, Heresy defeated Jeff Bradley at "IPW Reborn" for the IPW Television Championship. He remained champion for almost four months before losing the belt to Rod Steel. The Blue Meanie served as a special guest referee. He also signed an exclusive contract with New Era Pro Wrestling based in eastern Ohio in April 2002 where he teamed with both Booker and Chi Chi Cruz. In June 2002, Heresy and Chi Chi Cruz wrestled Chris Hamrick and Jerry Lynn in Titusville, Pennsylvania. Heresy later called this his favorite match of the year. Later that month, Heresy wrestled Eric Justice at the PCW Arena in Toms River, New Jersey. Heresy spent as much as three to four days driving across the country to an event compared to the average 7–8 hour driving time for New England indy workers.

=== Return to New England (2002) ===
With the extra time spent traveling across the country, Heresy limited his New England appearances to a few select promotions. In November 2001, Heresy represented the EWA at the "Headlocks for Humanity" show in Somerville, Massachusetts. The event was a fundraiser for the American Red Cross following the September 11th terrorist attacks and co-hosted by eight New England promotions including Chaotic Wrestling, New England Championship Wrestling, NWA New England and Yankee Pro Wrestling. Heresy joined Stefan Ramsey and Frankie Armadillo in a six-man tag team match against Adam Booker, Damian Houston and Brian Black. At Power-Fest 2002, Heresy won the vacant PLW Heavyweight Championship by defeating Johnny Curtis, Derik Destiny, Kid Krazy, Manical Mark, Kenn Phoenix, Shane Simons and Don Vega in a Pier 8 Brawl match. The show raised money for the construction of a permanent 9/11 memorial at the Rhode Island State House. Heresy remained champion for two years.

Heresy also debuted in the Eastern Wrestling Alliance, based in Portland, Maine, where he battled wrestlers such as Damian Houston, Kid Krazy and Antonio Thomas. He and Thomas were among the EWA wrestlers profiled by The Portland Phoenix in August 2002. It was there that he formed a third version of Mind Over Matter with Maverick Wild and won the promotion's tag team championship. That same year, Heresy was one of the EWA stars who appeared in the 2002 documentary "Don't Stop Believing" where he discussed some of the personal sacrifices he has made due to his pro wrestling career. Heresy took a few weeks off during the summer before returning to action. In September 2002, Heresy and Adam Booker lost to Adam Hastey and Kid Krazy at Green Mountain Wrestling's "Unlikely Alliances".

=== NWA: Total Nonstop Action (2002) ===
In late 2002, Hamrick contacted NWA Wildside promoter Bill Behrens about bringing in Heresy as his opponent for a pay-per-view dark match with NWA: Total Nonstop Action on December 11, 2002. Heresy was to appear as a last-minute replacement for Hamrick's original opponent Chi Chi Cruz. Cruz was contacted in time for the match making Heresy's involvement unnecessary. Behrens, who was scheduling the dark matches for TNA, was not informed of this. Heresy remained unaware of the TNA ppv booking until Behrens reminded him when Heresy arrived for NWA Wildside's Fright Night Tag Tournament. Once the confusion was cleared up, Behrens offered Heresy his own match on the show which he accepted. Heresy ended up wrestling Jorge Estrada in front of 1,000 fans at the Fairgrounds Coliseum in Nashville, Tennessee. He was one of several New England independent wrestlers to appear on TNA Xplosion.

=== Eastern Wrestling Alliance (2003) ===
By the mid-2000s, Heresy had become involved behind the scenes in the EWA. He was initially a booker, bringing in talent from IPW Hardcore and NWA Florida, and later a part owner with Maverick Wild for a time. During his tenure with the company, the EWA expanded into Central Massachusetts where it developed a strong fan following. Dr. Heresy was presented as a "heel" in Maine but, due to his growing popularity, wrestled as a "babyface" in Massachusetts. He had a seven-month feud with Kid Crazy and Adam Booker which lasted until the spring of 2003. He eventually lost the EWA Heavyweight Championship to Maverick Wild at the end of the year.

=== Independent circuit (2003) ===
On June 28, 2003, Heresy entered the 2003 New England Invitational Tournament in Sanford, Maine sponsored by The New England Independent website. Heresy was eliminated by Luis Ortiz in the opening round. On August 10, Heresy and R. J. Brewer were brought into Assault Championship Wrestling battling each other for a title shot against then ACW Heavyweight Champion Johnny Thunder. On September 7, Heresy defeated Jim Nastic at ACW's "No Excuses" show to become the number one contender for the ACW Television Championship. Heresy unsuccessfully challenged Vince Vicallo for the Chaotic Wrestling New England Championship in Methuen, Massachusetts the following week.

=== Clinically Inclined (2003–2004) ===
Around this time, Heresy formed Clinically Inclined with Andre Lyonz. In the late fall of 2003, they worked several shows for New Wrestling Horizons in Buxton, Maine. On October 7, Clinically Inclined entered a championship tournament for the vacant tag team titles. They and their opponents, Mighty Mini and Brian Black, were eliminated in the first round when both teams fought to a double disqualification. Heresy was also disqualified in his match against NWH Heavyweight Champion "Italian Superman" Sonny Roselli later that night. The also lost to Legion Cage and Rain in Fairfield on November 7. On December 3, 2003, Heresy was pinned by Gangrel in Fairfield, Maine. He and Lyonz continued teaming together but they did not fare well in NWH's tag team division. One night after his defeat against Gangrel, Heresy and Lyonz lost their rematch against Mighty Mini and Brian Black. They left the promotion shortly thereafter.

Elsewhere on the New England indy circuit, Heresy competed for the All-Star Wrestling Association in Nashua, New Hampshire. Under the management of Dirty Scott Dickenson, he won the AWA Americas and New England Championships from Maverick Wild and AJ Storm respectively.

On February 8, 2004, Heresy and Jack Victory lost to The Christopher Street Connection (Buff E and Mace Mendoza) in Fall River, Massachusetts during Steve Corino's Pro Wrestling World-1's debut tour. On March 13, Heresy and Tim Kilgore lost to El Boricua and Aaron Morrison at a New England Championship Wrestling event in Framingham, Massachusetts. On June 5, Clinically Inclined represented the EWA at the 2nd annual Jeff Peterson Memorial Cup. They were featured in the second night's main event with Double Deuce Inc. (Frankie Capone and Marcus Dillon). On August 13, Heresy and Andre Lyonz lost to The Killer Babes (April Hunter and Nikki Roxx) in an intergender tag team match in Naugatuck, Connecticut. On October 3, 2004, at the New England Wrestling Association's Return to Exile show, Heresy and Maverick Wild were part of a championship tournament in Holbrook, Massachusetts for the promotion's vacant tag team title. They were eliminated by Jose Perez and Jason Blade in the first round. Later on, Heresy interfered in the final helping The Logan Brothers (Matt and Bryan Logan) defeat Perez and Blade. Heresy and Blade met at the Xtreme Wrestling Alliance's "Desolation In December" show in Providence, Rhode Island with Heresy defeating Blade for the XWA Heavyweight Championship.

=== Chaotic Wrestling (2004) ===
That same year, Heresy had become a regular for Chaotic Wrestling. On June 25, they lost to Pretty Psycho (Handsome Johnny and Psycho) in a seven-team Gauntlet match for the Chaotic Wrestling Tag Team Championship that also included The Lost Souls (Peter Mulloy and Brian Buffet), The Logan Brothers (Bryan and Ted Logan), Matthew Evagrius and Chase Del Monte, Omega Security (Max Mailhot and Tony Omega), and Shawn Donovan and Roman. Heresy made his single's debut at Summer Chaos 2004 defeating El Chupacabra. On September 17, 2004, Heresy was defeated by Maverick Wild in Lowell, Massachusetts. Heresy came back to the city five months later where he scored a victory over Fred Sampson. On April 1, 2005, Heresy lost to Arch Kincaid in a qualifying match for the Chaotic Wrestling Heavyweight Championship tournament. In the main event, he was in the corner of Bryan and Bill Logan when they won the tag team title from Pretty Psycho in a Best 2-of-3 Falls match.

=== Independent circuit (2005–2007) ===
On September 17, 2005, Heresy returned to St. Petersburg, Florida for IPW Hardcore's reunion show "Blood, Sweat and Beers" where he reunited with Don Juan de Santo to wrestle Vicious and Delicious (Axis and Python). Mind and Matter lost the match when de Santo fell victim to the team's then recent "Hand of God" finisher.

Heresy later joined Maverick Wild when his old partner started Front Row Wrestling in Rochester, New Hampshire. Heresy and Christian Angers were recognized as the promotion's first tag team champions. They lost the belts to Tim Walker and Tommy Mack in Claremont, New Hampshire on April 8, 2006. Mack suffered a serious head injury during the match and was unable to compete for several months. The titles were subsequently returned to Heresy and Angers. Their second reign lasted nearly four months before being defeated by Mack and Panther Martin in Keene, New Hampshire. On October 14, Heresy (with Nurse Kiki Van Dyke) was beaten by Antonio Thomas in Defiant Pro Wrestling. On the October 6th edition of Chaotic Wrestling, Heresy wrestled Maverick Wild with the added stipulation that if Heresy won then his opponent would become a permanent tag team. Heresy won the match by pinning Wild while illegally using the middle rope for leverage. On November 10, Heresy wrestled Nikki Roxx in an intergender match on Chaotic Wrestling television. At PLW's Power-House Brawl 2006, Heresy joined Kid Krazy and Chris Venom in a 6-man tag against Nick Steel, Sonny Goodspeed and DJ Baron. Later on, he was the nineteenth entrant in the Power-House Brawl match. He lasted 4 minutes and 15 seconds before being eliminated by DJ Baron.

On February 2, 2007, Heresy and Tanya Lee wrestled Chase Del Monte and Nikki Roxx in a mixed tag team match for Chaotic Wrestling's Cold Fury 6: Into the Fire. He spent several months in Chaotic Wrestling teaming with Chase Del Monte. On February 25, Heresy lost to Doink the Clown in Springfield, Massachusetts for Big Time Wrestling. That summer, Heresy returned to PLW for Power-Fest 2007 where he and Kid Krazy faced Chi Chi Cruz and Eric Dylan in a tag team match. He took part in the Great Outdoors Tour where he battled in a Pier 6 Brawl with Kid Pyro, Kid Krazy, Michael Sain, Huey McGraw and "Punisher" Don Vega to determine the opponent for PLW Champion Chris Blackheart in the main event. He was the first man eliminated. Afterwards, he addressed PLW's fans in South Attleboro, Massachusetts. At the 2007 Jeff Peterson Memorial Cup, Heresy wrestled The Bug, Jack Manley, and Jerrelle Clark in a 4-Way Crazyfest match. He was also one of the participants in the 19-man battle royal main event. Heresy lost to "Supermodel" Amy Love in an intergender match on the last night of the Jeff Peterson Memorial Cup. On July 26, Heresy partnered with David Cashe and Kid Krazy in a 6-man tag against Mike Striker, Chris Pyro and Vain for a Showcase Pro Wrestling event in North Attleboro, Massachusetts. On November 2, Heresy managed Maverick Wild in his match against Fred Sampson (accompanied by Big Rick Fuller) in Lowell. He also faced Antonio Thomas once again at a FRW show in Kingston, New Hampshire two weeks later.

=== Chaotic Wrestling (2008) ===
On January 18, 2008, Mind Over Matter and The Lost Souls wrestled Lock'N'Loaded (Chase Del Monte and Brandon Locke) and Team Fabulous (Big Rick Fuller and Fred Sampson) to determine the number one contender for the promotion's tag team title. On April 4, Heresy and Wild challenged The Blowout Boys (Danny E. and Tommy T.) for the Chaotic Wrestling Tag Team Championship in a 3-way tag team match also involving Nice’n Slow (Mike Nice and Psycho).

=== Independent circuit (2008–2010) ===
That spring, Heresy and Kid Krazy won the then vacant EWA Tag Team Championship in a gauntlet match. On May 4, the team wrestled The Wild Boys at PLW's Power-Fest 2008. On July 11, Heresy and Kid Krazy were part of the interpromotional supercard "Benefit For Brandon" in Fall River, Massachusetts which saw the participation of fifteen New England indy promotions. As the EWA Tag Team Champions, they joined Panther Martin in a 6-man tag team match against FRW's Shane Sharpe and Chunky But Funky (Sonny Goodspeed & D.J. Baron).

On February 20, 2009, Heresy and Johnny Vegas (with Marshall McNeil) won the FRW Tag Team Championship from Sethoran and Tony Star in Rindge, New Hampshire. They held the belts for over five months. On April 24, Heresy and Orleans Goodspeed III (with Joey Eastman) fought Intellectual Properties in Tyngsboro, Massachusetts during Chaotic Wrestling's "Weekend of Chaos". Heresy and Kid Krazy were part of PLW's "Great Outdoors Tour" that summer. On May 31, they teamed with B.A. Tatum to defeat Andy Licious, Billy King and Doug Summers at Power-Fest 2009. At Pro Wrestling America Live's "Full Throttle", the team of Heresy and Sonny Goodspeed were introduced by manager Joey Eastman. A week later, Heresy and Goodspeed faced Max Bauer and Mike Nice (with Psycho) at Chaotic Wrestling's "Summer Chaos 2009".

At the end of the year, Heresy began working for The Way Wrestling Was in Springfield, Massachusetts. He joined Johnny Idol and Marshall McNeil in a feud with Justin "The Hammer" Tunis. The trio lost to Tunis, Guido Torpedo and Bobby Ocean on December 12, 2009. On February 20, 2010, Heresy and Johnny Idol helped Marshall McNeil win his match against Justin "The Hammer" Tunis at "The Way Wrestling Was" in Springfield, Massachusetts. On March 12, Heresy lost to Dangerous Danny Davis at a World Wrestling Stars show in Bridgewater, Massachusetts. On April 18, Heresy was inducted into the New England Pro Wrestling Hall of Fame by Billy King and Don Juan DeSanto. He and Johnny Idol wrestled Sean Burke and Anthony Fitch at Power-Fest 2010 that summer. On November 20, 2010, Heresy wrestled Romeo Roselli for All Out Mayhem in South Portland, Maine. On April 17, 2011, he appeared for PLW's benefit show for St. Elizabeth Ann Seton Academy in Central Falls, Rhode Island. In the semi-main event, Heresy and Carlos Arenas lost to Paul Lauzon and Seton Academy teacher Paul Olson.

=== Eastern Wrestling Alliance (2011) ===
Heresy remained with the EWA during its last two years in operation. He also appeared in an on-screen role as host of the "Doctor's Office". Heresy was part of Marshall's Diamonds led by manager Marshall McNeil. He and the group feuded with a rival heel stable, Eastman Worldwide, led by one-time manager Joey Eastman. On September 3, 2011, EWA Heavyweight Champion Golden Burke barely managed to hold onto his title (via disqualification) thanks to outside interference from stablemates Heresy and William King. On October 8, 2011, Heresy and stablemate Jonny Idol wrestled Eastman Worldwide (Alex Cypher and Chris Mooch) at the Springfield Turnverein in Feeding Hills, Massachusetts.

=== Semi-retirement (2012–) ===
Heresy has wrestled sporadically since the close of Eastern Wrestling Alliance in the early-2010s. He does, however, continue to appear for PLW's annual charity and fundraising events. On June 8, 2012, Heresy and Aaron Morrison wrestled Zack Statik and Brad Hollister at PLW's annual Power-Fest show. At Power Fest 2013, Heresy teamed with Brad Hollister, Buddy Romano and Johnny Idol in an 8-man tag team match against Baby Rex, Chris Students, Isaiah Rex and Ken Combs. Heresy returned to PLW once the following year for Power Fest 2014, raising money for the American Cancer Society's Relay For Life, where he faced his former tag team partner, Don Juan DeSanto, in another eight-man tag team match. On April 25, 2015, Heresy and Jonny Idol were defeated by Jason Daniels and Jiggy Starr at PLW Power-Fest 2015 in Chepachet, Rhode Island.

== Championships and accomplishments ==
- All-Star Wrestling Association
  - AWA Americas Heavyweight Championship (1 time)
  - AWA New England Heavyweight Championship (1 time)
- Eastern Wrestling Alliance
  - EWA Heavyweight Championship (1 time)
  - EWA Tag Team Championship (2 times) – with Maverick Wild and Kid Krazy
- Front Row Wrestling
  - FRW Tag Team Championship (3 times) – with Christian Angers (2) and Johnny Vegas
- IPW Hardcore
  - IPW Television Championship (1 time)
- Independent Wrestling Alliance
  - IWA Tag Team Championship (1 time) – with Don Juan DeSanto
- International Independent Wrestling
  - IIW Television Championship (1 time)
  - IIW Tag Team Championship (1 time) – with
- New England Pro Wrestling Hall of Fame
  - Class of 2010
- Nittany Valley Wrestling
  - NVW Tag Team Championship (1 time) – with Don Juan DeSanto
- Power League Wrestling
  - PLW Heavyweight Championship (2 times)
  - PLW New England Championship (1 time)
- South Coast Championship Wrestling
  - SCCW Heavyweight Championship (2 times)
- Unified Championship Wrestling
  - UCW Cruiserweight Championship (2 times)
- Xtreme Wrestling Alliance
  - XWA Heavyweight Championship (1 time)
