= Fandango (wrestler) =

American professional wrestler (born 1983)

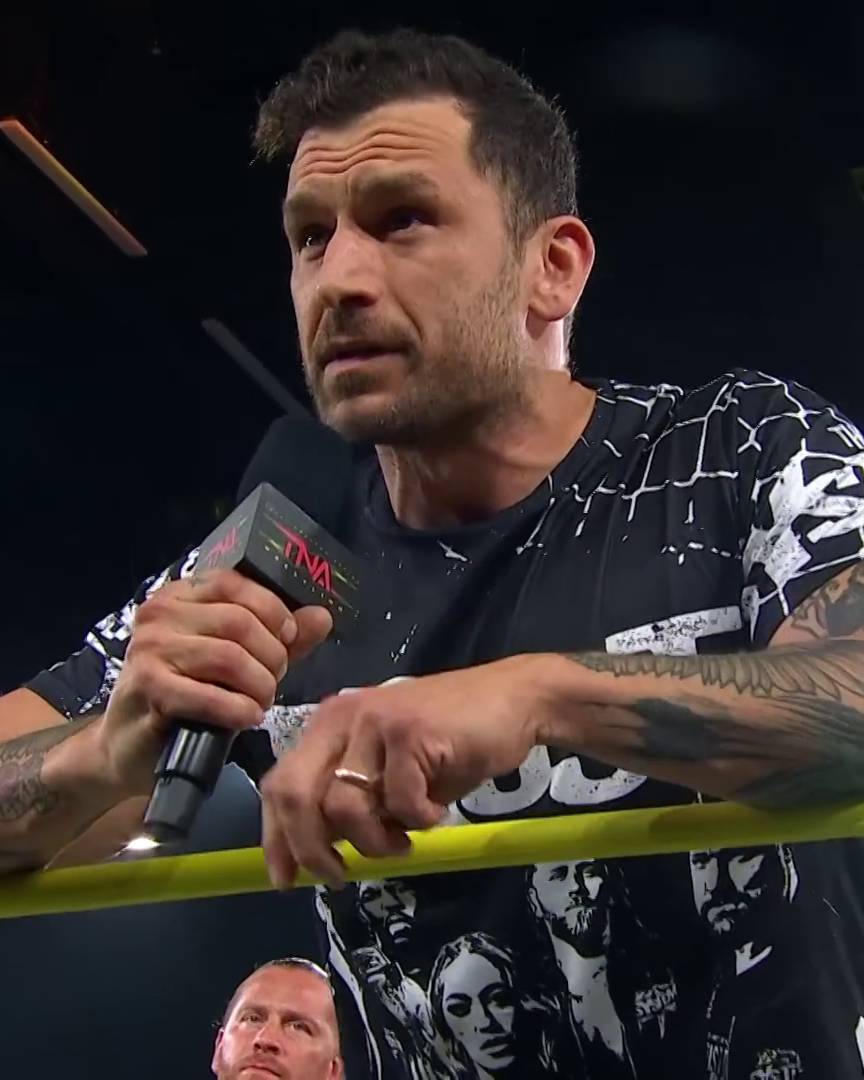
- Fandango in 2025

Personal information
- Born: Curtis Jonathan Hussey; July 22, 1983 (age 43) Portland, Maine, U.S.
- Spouse: Emily Violet (m. 2025)

Professional wrestling career
- Ring names: Curt Hussey; Dirty Dango; Fandango; Jonathan Armadillo; Johnny Dango Curtis (JDC); Johnny Curtis; The Portuguese Sundragon
- Billed height: 6 ft 4 in (193 cm)
- Billed weight: 244 lb (111 kg)
- Billed from: Boston, Massachusetts; Westbrook, Maine
- Trained by: Killer Kowalski; Deep South Wrestling; Bill DeMott; Florida Championship Wrestling; Larry Huntley
- Debut: September 26, 1999
- Retired: January 17, 2026

Curtis Jonathan Hussey (born July 22, 1983) is an American retired professional wrestler and actor. He is signed to Total Nonstop Action Wrestling (TNA) as a producer. He is best known for his tenure with WWE, where he performed under the ring name Fandango from 2013 to 2021.

Hussey began his professional wrestling career in 1999. He competed in several independent promotions in New England, winning the PLW New England Championship, the PWF Northeast Tag Team Championship with Kenn Phoenix on more than one occasion, the PWF Northeast Heavyweight Championship, NCW New England Championship, the Tag Team Championship with Damian Houston, and the SCCW Lightweight Championship.

In 2006, Hussey signed a development contract with World Wrestling Entertainment (WWE) and was assigned to their developmental territory, Deep South Wrestling (DSW). He was then moved to Florida Championship Wrestling (FCW) in June 2008 as Johnny Curtis, where he won the Florida Tag Team Championship on more than one occasion with Tyler Reks and Derrick Bateman. In December 2010, he competed in the fourth season of NXT, and he eventually won the competition in March 2011. In 2013, Hussey re-debuted as Fandango. Subsequently, WWE audience members started singing and dancing to his entrance music, which rose substantially on the iTunes charts and generated coverage in mainstream media. He later formed a tag team with Tyler Breeze called Breezango, with the duo winning the NXT Tag Team Championship in August 2020.

After departing WWE in June 2021, Hussey signed a contract with Total Nonstop Action Wrestling (TNA), where he performed as Dirty Dango before re-introducing himself as Johnny Dango Curtis (JDC), becoming a member of The System stable. He retired from professional wrestling in 2026 and transitioned into a backstage role with TNA.

== Early life ==
Curtis Jonathan Hussey was born on July 22, 1983, in Portland, Maine. Hussey is a Native American of the Cherokee tribe.

== Professional wrestling career ==
=== Independent circuit (1999–2006) ===
Hussey trained under Killer Kowalski and debuted in September 1999. He wrestled for various independent promotions in the New England area over the next few years. He competed in Power League Wrestling (PLW) from 2000 until 2003, during which time he won the PLW New England Championship. He held the championship, after defeating Chris Blackheart at Power-fest 2002, from May 19, 2002, until May 18, 2003.

He also competed in the Premier Wrestling Federation during this time, and he teamed with Kenn Phoenix to win the PWF Northeast Tag Team Championship from Fuzion (Mike Paiva and Blade) on October 28, 2002. They held the championship until November 15, when they were defeated by Paiva and Kid Mikaze. Now known as The Talent Exchange, Hussey and Phoenix won a three-way Tables, Ladders, and Chairs match to win the championship again on February 15, 2003. They held the championship until April 4, when Phoenix and Dean Ripley, The Talent Exchange's manager (who had been forced to participate in the match instead of an absent Hussey), lost the championship to the Storm Brothers. He also wrestled for NWA: Total Nonstop Action (NWA-TNA), Chaotic Wrestling, and NWA Wildside.

=== World Wrestling Entertainment/WWE (2006–2021) ===
==== Deep South Wrestling (2006–2008) ====
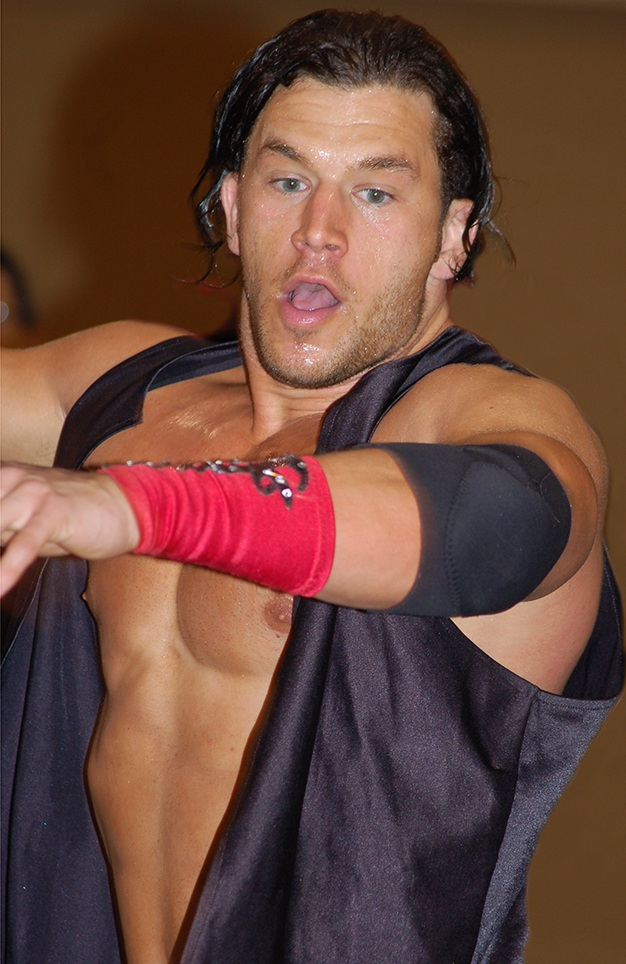
Johnny Curtis at at a Deep South Wrestling (DSW) event in 2009.

In 2006, Curtis signed a developmental contract with World Wrestling Entertainment (WWE) and was subsequently assigned to the Deep South Wrestling (DSW) developmental territory. Curtis made his debut for the territory on November 9, where he lost to David Heath. After losing consistently over the next several weeks, Curtis scored his first victory in DSW as he and Robert Anthony defeated The Headliners (Shawn Shultz and Chris Michaels) on February 15, 2007.

Curtis continued to team with Anthony and after winning a few more matches, the team faced the DSW Tag Team Champions Team Elite (Mike Knox and Derick Neikirk) in a match for the championship on March 15, but they were unable to win the title. Curtis then became a singles competitor once again and after losing two matches, he won his final match in DSW by defeating Frankie Coverdale on April 12.

==== Florida Championship Wrestling (2008–2010) ====
In June 2008, after WWE severed ties with DSW, Curtis and all the other talent in DSW were transferred over to the newly established Florida Championship Wrestling (FCW). On June 26, Curtis made his FCW debut as he defeated former tag team partner Robert Anthony. After mixed success as a singles and tag team wrestler, Curtis defeated Chris Gray on December 18 to become the number one contender for the FCW Southern Heavyweight Championship. On January 8, 2008, he wrestled Ted DiBiase Jr. for the championship, but lost the match. On September 18, Curtis made an appearance at the SmackDown/ECW tapings, where he defeated Armando Estrada in a dark match.

On December 11, 2008, Curtis teamed with Tyler Reks to defeat The New Hart Foundation (DH Smith and TJ Wilson) for the FCW Florida Tag Team Championship. The team of Curtis and Reks proved to be successful, and they retained the championship on several occasions. After beginning a feud with Caylen Croft and Trent Beretta, Curtis and Reks retained the title against them on a few different occasions before finally losing the title to Croft and Beretta on April 30, 2009, after Curtis did not appear for the title defense, leaving Reks to wrestle alone.

After Reks was called up to WWE's main roster, Curtis renamed himself Jonathan Curtis and became a villain. The two then faced off for Reks' Florida Heavyweight Championship on June 25, but Curtis was unable to win the title. On July 2, Curtis wrestled in a triple threat match for the FCW Florida Championship also involving Alex Riley, but was again unsuccessful as Reks retained the title. Soon afterwards, Curtis reverted his ring name to Johnny Curtis.

Beginning in 2010, Curtis began competing at house shows for the Raw brand, with his first match being a loss to Evan Bourne on January 8. After losing several matches to both Bourne and Paul Burchill at house shows, Curtis wrestled his first dark match, which he lost to Kung Fu Naki on the January 19 episode of ECW.

On August 12, 2010, Curtis teamed with Derrick Bateman to win the FCW Florida Tag Team Championship by defeating the team of Donny Marlow and Brodus Clay and the defending champions, Los Aviadores (Hunico and Epico) in a three-way tag team match. After a near three-month reign, Curtis and Bateman lost the championship to Wes Brisco and Xavier Woods on November 4.

==== NXT (2010–2012) ====
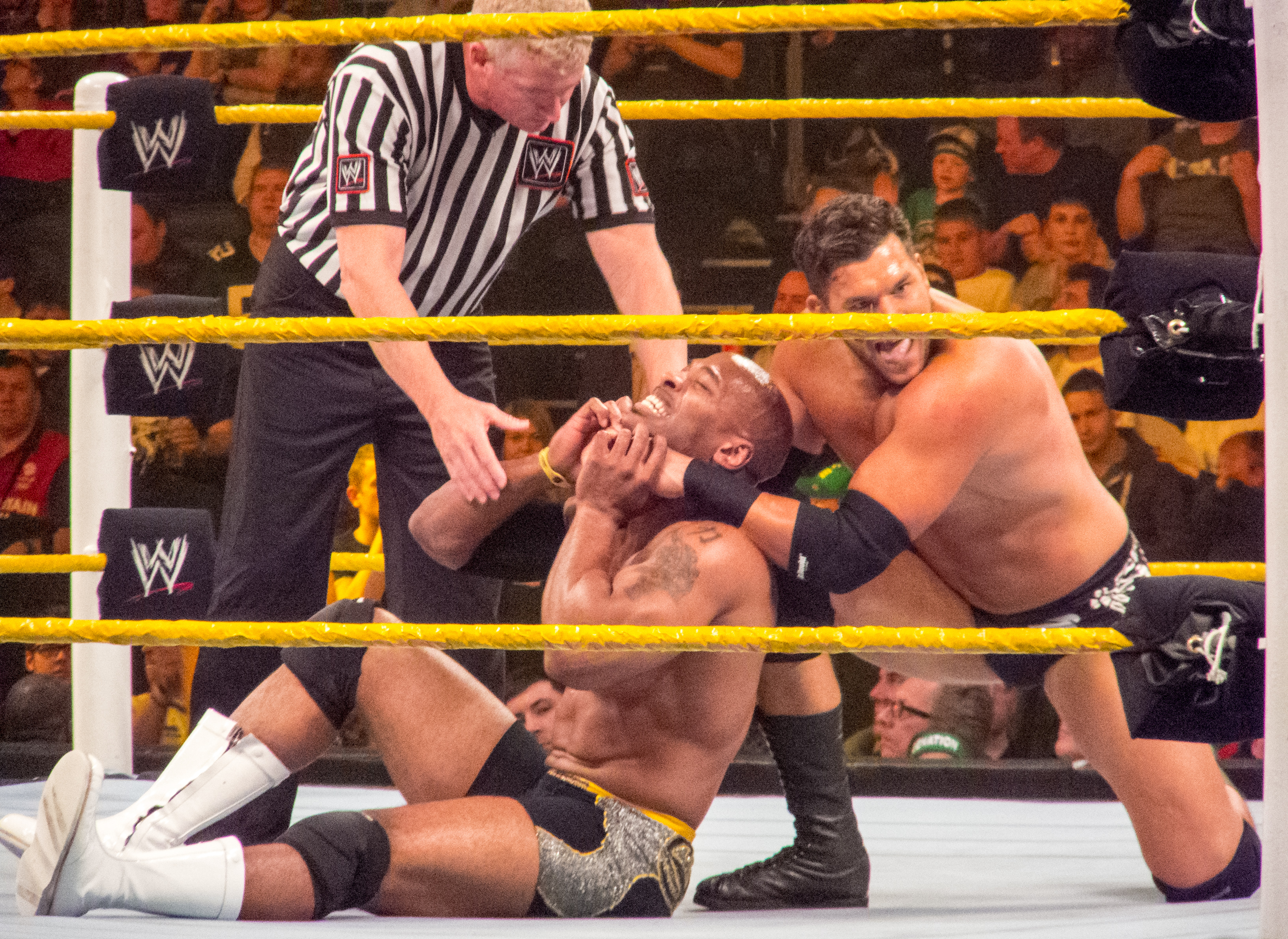
Curtis wrestling Percy Watson at a NXT event in 2012.

Curtis was part of the fourth season, with R-Truth as his mentor. He made his in-ring debut on the season premiere on December 7 episode of NXT, defeating fellow rookie Jacob Novak in singles competition. The following week, Curtis was unsuccessful in the "Karaoke" challenge, but was successful in the "Obstacle Course" challenge, earning points towards immunity from elimination. On the December 21 episode of NXT, Curtis lost the "Wheelbarrow Race" challenge, and suffered his first loss in a rematch to Jacob Novak. Curtis was then defeated by pro Dolph Ziggler on the December 28 episode of NXT, and afterwards won both the "Power of the Punch" challenge and a "Talent Show" contest. On the January 4, 2011, episode of NXT, Curtis was defeated in singles competition by Brodus Clay. It was later revealed that he was immune from elimination that week. On the next week of NXT, Curtis lost both the "Slingshot Challenge" and the "Superstar Password" challenge, and competed in singles competition defeating pro Ted DiBiase after a failed interference by his rookie Brodus Clay. Curtis was unsuccessful in the "How Well Do You Know Your WWE Pro?" challenge on the January 18 episode of NXT, and was safe from elimination that week. On the January 25 episode of NXT, Curtis was unsuccessful in the "Out-think the Fink" challenge, and competed in a fatal four-way match with Brodus Clay, Derrick Bateman, and Byron Saxton with Clay winning the match.

On the February 1 episode of NXT, Curtis won an "Arm Wrestling" challenge, but was unsuccessful in the "Talk the Talk" challenge, and also lost in a tag team match along with R-Truth against Derrick Bateman and Daniel Bryan. On the next week of NXT, Curtis was unsuccessful in a "Rock 'Em Sock 'Em Rookies" challenge, "WWE.com" challenge, and in singles competition against Brodus Clay. On the February 15 episode of NXT, Curtis lost the "Smash and Grab" challenge and the "Save Your Trivia" challenge. Curtis was then successful in the "Grace Under Pressure Physical" challenge and in a triple threat match against Derrick Bateman and Johnny Curtis. During the season finale on March 1, Curtis was declared the winner of NXT, defeating Brodus Clay in the final.

After various dark matches, Curtis debuted on SmackDown on the June 3 episode in a bizarre backstage promo where he said that his promised tag team title shot was "not going to happen" in light of R-Truth's recent villainous turn. He then began to sarcastically cry and proceeded to pour milk onto a plate and then over his head, in reference to the saying "don't cry over spilled milk". After weeks of backstage promos playing on words, Curtis made his SmackDown in-ring debut on the August 12 episode, being squashed by Mark Henry in less than a minute, which was his only non-battle royal match on SmackDown in 2011.

Curtis then made his return to the fifth season of NXT as a heel on November 2. Curtis turned his attentions to wooing Maxine, whom he had formerly dated, and therefore ignited a feud with Maxine's storyline fiancé, Derrick Bateman. As the weeks passed, Bateman and Maxine ultimately broke up as Maxine gave a kiss to Curtis on the December 28 episode of NXT Redemption, thus solidifying their relationship. On the January 4, 2012, episode of NXT Redemption, Curtis and Maxine revealed that they would marry in two weeks time in Las Vegas during Bateman's match with Darren Young. On 100th episode of NXT, Derrick Bateman interrupted Curtis and Maxine's wedding ceremony. Derrick showed a clip of Curtis sending a message on Bateman's iPad to Theodore Long (Maxine had dumped Bateman because he had allegedly sent a message to Long saying he did not need Maxine and wanted to leave her on NXT whilst he had a chance at getting a contract on Smackdown). Maxine then slapped Curtis and reunited with Bateman once again after finding out that it was not true. Curtis then started to use his new catchphrase "Let's Get Weird" which was also printed on his trunks. In the next weeks, Maxine dumped Bateman for Curtis again. On the March 14 episode of NXT Redemption, Curtis and Maxine were defeated in a mixed tag team match against Derrick Bateman and Kaitlyn, who kissed at the end of the match, solidifying their relationship to the annoyance of Maxine.

After William Regal was appointed as NXT's authority figure, Maxine enlisted Curtis' help to allow her to get close to Regal. On the March 21 episode of NXT Redemption, Maxine and Curtis knocked out Matt Striker with chloroform so that Maxine could join Regal on commentary. However, Striker was then kidnapped (kayfabe) by unknown persons, later revealed to be Curt Hawkins and Tyler Reks, who intended to blackmail Curtis and Maxine into using Maxine's charms to get Regal to leave Hawkins and Reks alone. Striker was rescued by Bateman and Kaitlyn on the April 11 episode of "NXT Redemption". On April 18, William Regal forced Maxine to sign a contract as Curtis's manager if the two still wanted to be employed to NXT and then handcuffed them together. On the May 9 episode of NXT Redemption, Regal allowed Curtis and Maxine to be uncuffed.

For the rest of 2012, Curtis formed an occasional tag team with Michael McGillicutty. On the final episode of the fifth season of NXT on June 13, Curtis teamed with McGillicutty but lost to the Usos. After the conclusion of the fifth season of NXT, NXT transitioned into the renamed Florida Championship Wrestling developmental territory. Curtis continued appearing on NXT, where at the October 11 tapings (which aired on November 28) Curtis finally received his tag team title shot from winning season four of NXT, when he teamed up with McGillicutty in a loss to champions Team Hell No (Kane and Daniel Bryan).

==== Championship pursuits (2013–2016) ====
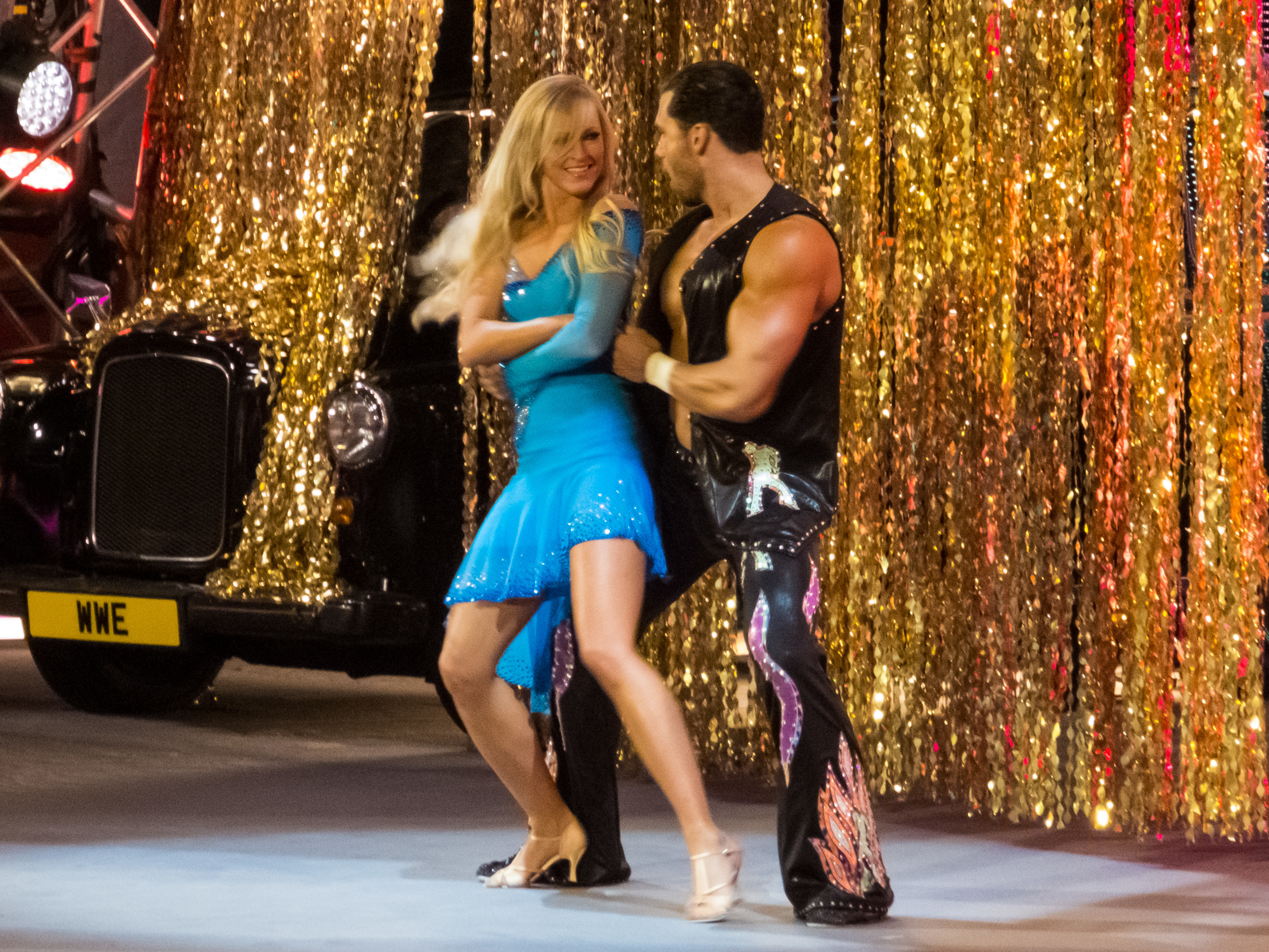
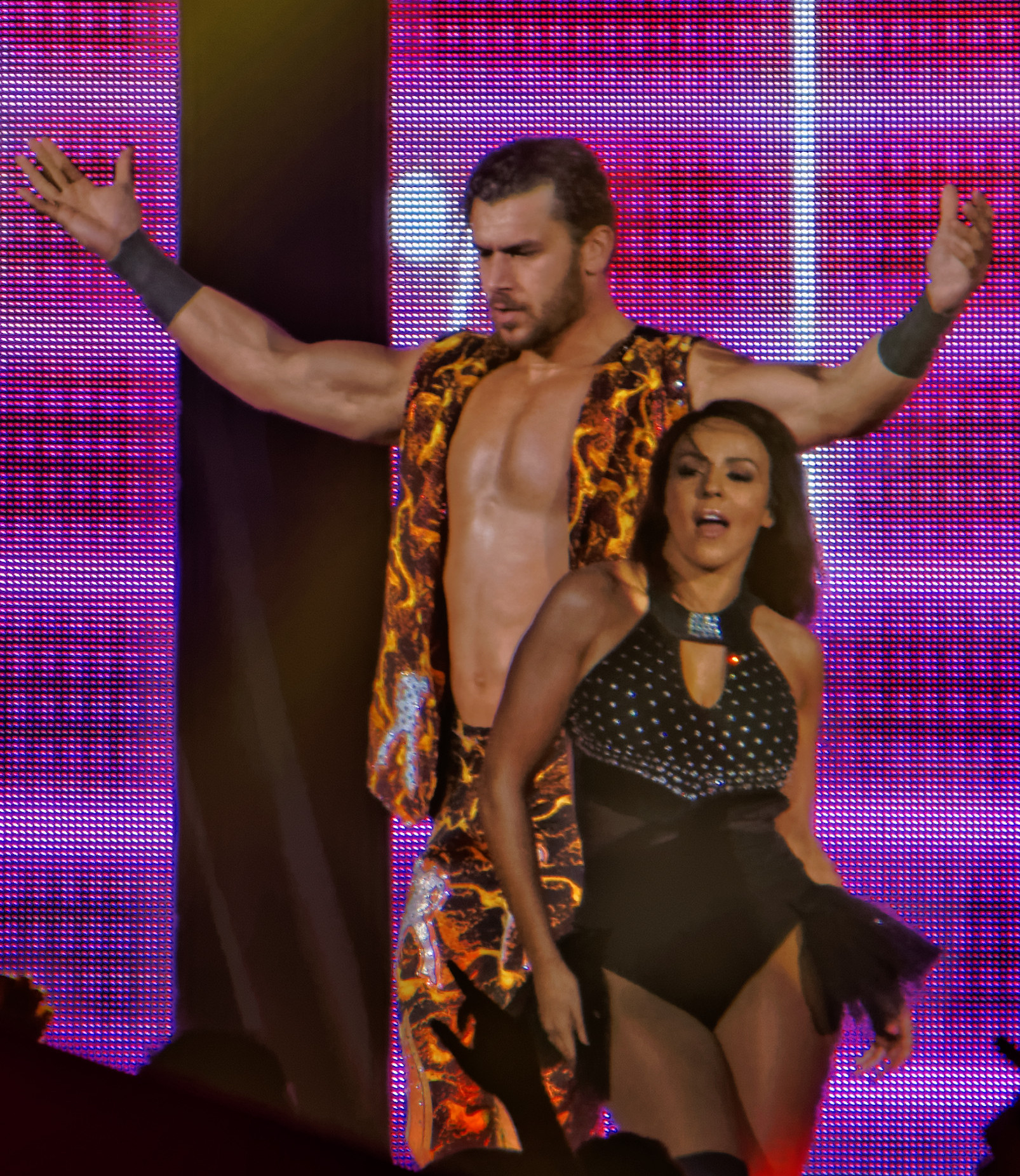
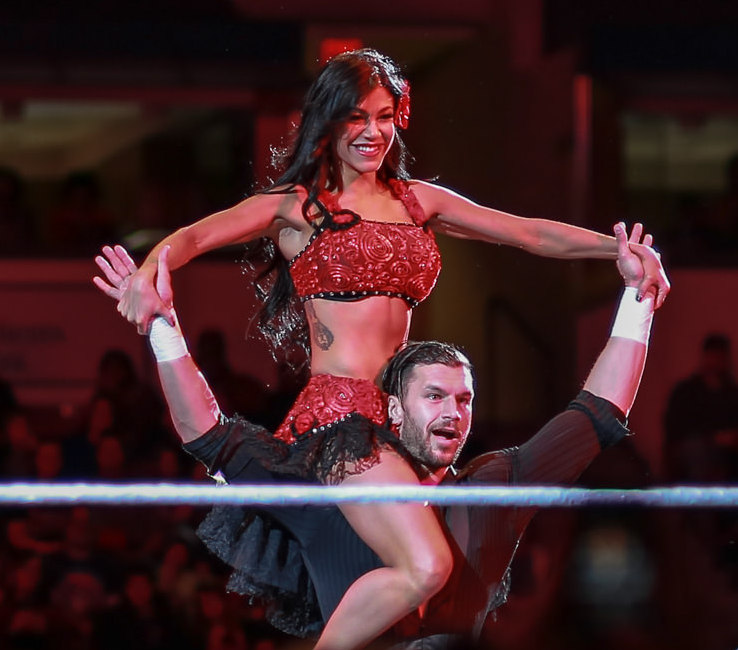
Fandango was accompanied by various dance partners, including Summer Rae, Layla, and Rosa Mendes.

At the October 23, 2012 SmackDown taping, Hussey debuted a new ballroom dancer character named Fandango in a dark match, with vignettes for the character airing by November. After months of promotional videos, the character of Fandango debuted on the March 1, 2013, episode of SmackDown. As part of his act, Fandango was portrayed as fussy, flamboyant, and sultry-voiced. He was also accompanied by a female dance partner, mostly by a dark-haired and unnamed Andrea Lynn (a real-life dancer and at the time college student) and later Summer Rae, a developmental wrestler.

Despite his debut, Fandango refused to wrestle his first match on numerous occasions because the ring announcers and his opponents could not pronounce "Fandango" to his satisfaction. On the March 18 episode of Raw, Chris Jericho mispronounced Fandango's name intentionally and repeatedly to start Fandango's first feud. In his debut match on the main roster at WrestleMania 29, Fandango scored what would be the biggest win of his career when he defeated Jericho. He then wrestled in his first Raw match against Kofi Kingston the following night. Despite Fandango being a heel and winning via disqualification from Chris Jericho attacking him, he still received an enthusiastic ovation from the live audience as they boisterously sang his theme music and created a dance for it as well. Not only did this take place during and shortly after his encounter, but it also took place long after the show itself. The song became an overnight hit as many fans took to iTunes to buy the single, causing it to gain considerable momentum and move from #175 to #11 in one day on the UK chart, before settling at #44 by the week's end. In spite of the phenomenon which WWE labelled as "Fandango-ing", the Fandango character continued to insult audiences. At Extreme Rules, Fandango was defeated by Jericho in a rematch to end their feud. Fandango moved on to a three-way feud for the WWE Intercontinental Championship against champion Wade Barrett and fellow challenger The Miz. Days later, Fandango distracted The Miz by dancing at ringside while The Miz was wrestling Barrett; then he attacked The Miz, resulting in The Miz gaining a disqualification win over Barrett. Fandango later pinned Barrett in a non-title match after The Miz, who was the special guest referee, attacked Barrett. A triple threat match for the Intercontinental title was set for Payback which Fandango was booked to win. However, he suffered a legitimate concussion during a SmackDown taping against Zack Ryder in June and was removed from the match. His replacement, Curtis Axel, won the match and the championship.

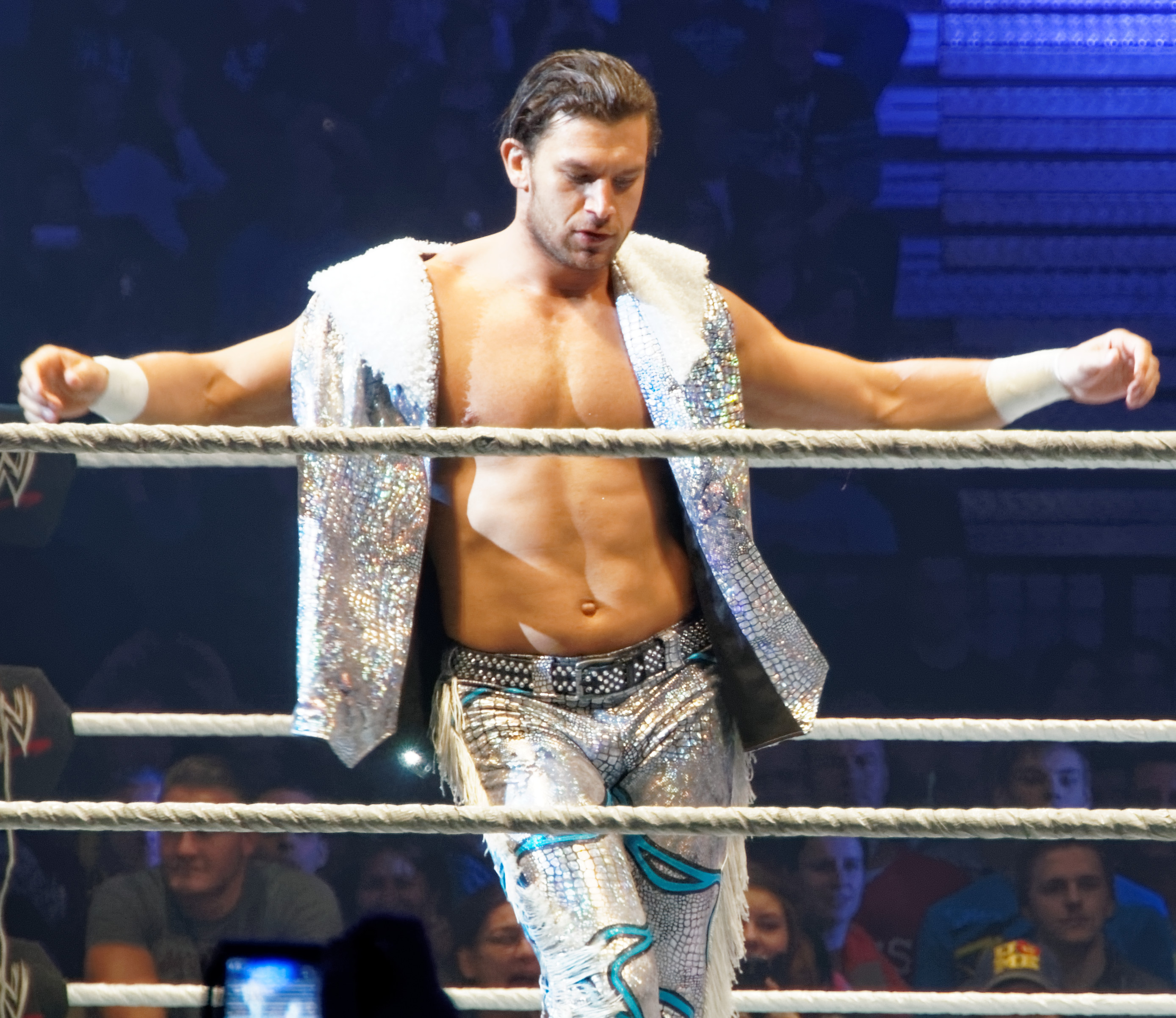
Fandango in November 2013

Fandango returned on the July 1 Raw, losing to Sheamus via count-out. At the Money in the Bank pay-per-view, Fandango competed in the World Heavyweight Championship Money in the Bank ladder match, but was unsuccessful as the match was won by Damien Sandow. On the September 2 episode of Raw, Fandango had his nose broken during a match against The Miz, which he lost. Fandango then lost a dance contest to The Miz, which also involved R-Truth and The Great Khali, as well as losing another match to him at Night of Champions. His losing streak came to an end on the September 16 Raw, where he defeated R-Truth. At Hell in a Cell, Fandango and Summer Rae defeated Natalya and The Great Khali in a mixed tag team match. On the December 23 Raw, Fandango defeated Dolph Ziggler in a "Present on a Pole match" to earn a WWE Intercontinental Championship match against Big E Langston the following week, however he was ultimately defeated. On the March 3 episode of Raw, Fandango and Summer Rae lost to Emma and Santino in a mixed tag team match, when Emma once again made Rae submit.

At Wrestlemania XXX, Fandango competed in the "André the Giant Memorial Battle Royal" match in a losing effort. The following night on Raw, Fandango and Summer Rae were once again defeated by Emma and Marella in a mixed tag team match, with Emma making Rae submit. The following week, Layla replaced Summer Rae as Fandango's dancer and valet, and quickly became embroiled in a feud with Emma and Santino Marella. Rae returned on May 19, attacking Layla. On the July 11 episode of Smackdown, Fandango lost to Adam Rose by countout after Summer Rae started attacking Layla. Later, he got a kiss from both women and started dancing, leading to both women attacking him and dancing together. Layla and Summer Rae went on to cause Fandango numerous losses on WWE television.

After months of absence, Fandango returned with Rosa Mendes as his new dance partner to compete in the pre-show match at Survivor Series, defeating Justin Gabriel with a salsa dancer gimmick and new theme music. Fandango participated in the Royal Rumble match, in which he was eliminated by Rusev.

On the April 13 episode of Raw, after losing to Stardust, Fandango brought back his old theme and dance and dissolved his relationship with Mendes, turning face in the process for the first time since 2010. Mendes then cost Fandango a match against Adam Rose, joining his "Exotic Express" and sparking a short feud between Fandango and Rose. Fandango earned the majority of victories between the two over the next few weeks on television and at house shows, ending the feud in mid-2015. Fandango then commonly appeared on Superstars and Main Event, defeating the likes of Adam Rose and Heath Slater. Fandango suffered a loss to Rusev on the episode of Main Event on August 17.

On the March 21, 2016, episode of Raw, Fandango faced Chris Jericho in a losing effort. At WrestleMania 32, Fandango was the first participant to be eliminated from the Andre The Giant Memorial Battle Royal.

==== Breezango (2016–2021) ====
On the April 14 episode of SmackDown, Fandango teamed with Goldust in the WWE Tag Team Championship number one contender's tournament, replacing R-Truth; the two were defeated by The Vaudevillains in the first round. On the May 12 episode of SmackDown, a match pitting Fandango and Goldust against R-Truth and Tyler Breeze ended with a quirky result when Fandango and Breeze turned on their partners, who had refused to fight each other. Fandango aligned with Breeze, adopting the name "Breezango", thus turning heel once again. The new team defeated The Golden Truth (Goldust and R-Truth) a week later on Raw but lost a rematch at the Money in the Bank, ending the feud. After being drafted to SmackDown brand as a result of the WWE draft, Breezango defeated The Usos on July 24 at Battleground. Breezango then entered a tournament which would determine the inaugural SmackDown Tag Team Champions, they were eliminated in the first round by American Alpha. On the November 8 episode of SmackDown Live, Breezango defeated The Vaudevillains to qualify for Team SmackDown for the 10-on-10 Survivor Series Tag Team Elimination match at Survivor Series; they were the first team eliminated from the match, which was ultimately won by Team Raw. During this time, Breezango began to refer themselves as "Fashion Police". At WrestleMania 33, Fandango took part in the André the Giant Memorial Battle Royal, which he failed to win.

On the April 25, 2017, episode of SmackDown Live, Breezango defeated The Ascension in a Beat the Clock challenge match, becoming number one contenders for the SmackDown Tag Team Championship. Fandango turned into a fan favorite in the process. At Backlash, Breezango unsuccessfully challenged The Usos for the SmackDown Tag Team Championship. Breezango lost to Kevin Owens and Sami Zayn at Survivor Series and to The Bludgeon Brothers at Clash of Champions. On March 11, 2018, at Fastlane, Breezango teamed with Tye Dillinger to defeat Mojo Rawley, Chad Gable and Shelton Benjamin in a six-man tag team match. At WrestleMania 34, Fandango competed in the André the Giant Battle Royal, but was unsuccessful. On April 16, Breezango were moved to Raw brand as part of Superstar Shake-up. On that night, they defeated Cesaro and Sheamus. On July 6, it was reported that Fandango has suffered a left labrum tear in his shoulder and that he would be out of action at least six months.

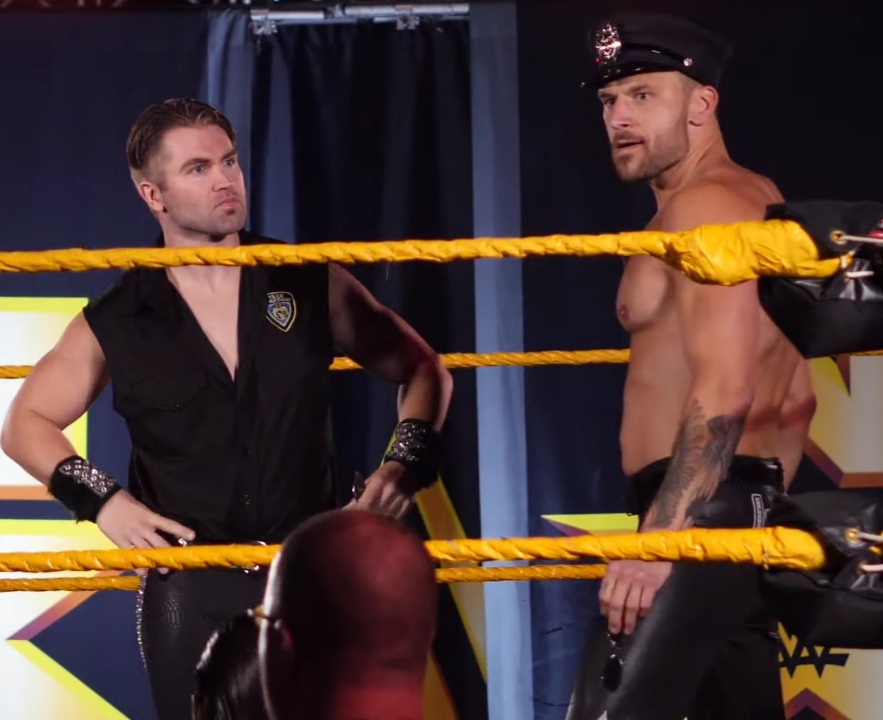
Breezango at an NXT event in 2019

At the end of the year, Breeze and Fandango were sent to NXT. According to Dave Meltzer, WWE assigned them to the brand to work as experienced veterans to work with the younger talent and to help NXT's rating during the Wednesday Night War against the All Elite Wrestling's Dynamite. Fandango returned from the injury a year later, on the July 31, 2019, episode of NXT, saving his tag team partner Tyler Breeze from a post-match attack by The Forgotten Sons (Jaxson Ryker, Steve Cutler and Wesley Blake). Breezango began a feud with The Forgotten Sons, defeating them in tag team action as well as in a six-man tag action with Isaiah "Swerve" Scott as their partner. However, in December, Fandango was sidelined with another injury as he announced he had undergone Ulnar collateral ligament reconstruction (Tommy John surgery) with an expected recovery of six to twelve months.

Fandango returned on the June 3, 2020, episode of NXT, teaming with Breeze to defeat Oney Lorcan and Danny Burch, and The Undisputed Era (Bobby Fish and Roderick Strong) in a number one contender's match for the NXT Tag Team Championship. On the June 17 episode of NXT, Breezango failed to win the titles from Imperium (Fabian Aichner and Marcel Barthel), after interference from both Lorcan and Burch and Indus Sher (Rinku and Saurav). At NXT TakeOver XXX, Breezango defeated Oney Lorcan and Danny Burch, and Legado del Fantasma (Joaquin Wilde and Raul Mendoza) in a triple threat tag team match to become the number one contenders for the NXT Tag Team Championship. On the August 26 episode of NXT, Breezango defeated Imperium to win the titles, marking Fandango's first title in WWE, nearly ten years after his NXT debut. On the October 21 episode of NXT, Breezango lost the titles to Danny Burch and Oney Lorcan, ending their reign at 56 days. On the November 11 episode of NXT, they failed to regain the titles from Lorcan and Burch in a rematch.

In early 2021, Breezango participated in Dusty Rhodes Tag Team Classic, but were defeated by The Undisputed Era (Adam Cole and Roderick Strong) in the first round. On the June 15 episode of NXT, they defeated Imperium in what would be their final match in WWE. On June 25, Fandango, along with Breeze, was released from his WWE contract, ending his 15-year tenure with the company.

=== Return to the independent circuit (2021–2022) ===
As of July 15, 2021, Fandango now goes by the name, Dirty Dango on the independent circuit. On July 16, 2022, at Immortal Championship Wrestling Dirty Dango defeated Mike Skyros to become Immortal Heavyweight Champion in Schenectady, NY.

=== National Wrestling Alliance (2021–2022) ===
In December 2021, Dango made his debut for the National Wrestling Alliance (NWA) at the Hard Times 2 pay-per-view.

=== Impact Wrestling / Total Nonstop Action Wrestling (2022–present) ===
Hussey made his return for Impact Wrestling, previously known as TNA: Total Nonstop Action, under the ring name Dirty Dango, at the 2022 Bound for Glory, where he accepted Brian Myers' open challenge for the Impact Digital Media Championship, ultimately failing. In January 2023, it was confirmed that Dango has signed with Impact Wrestling. On the April 6 episode of Impact!, the Director of Authority Santino Marella was mysteriously attacked backstage. With Sami Callihan being suspected behind the attack as part of his initiation into The Design, Marella teamed up with Dango and the Digital Media Champion Joe Hendry on April 16, at Rebellion, to face and ultimately defeat the Design. Following Rebellion, Dango alongside Hendry decided to investigate who attacked Marella. On the May 18 episode of Impact!, It was revealed that Dango was Marella's assailant and proceed to attack Hendry, thus turning heel in the process. At Under Siege, Dango lost to Hendry by disqualification, Dango continued his assault on Hendry until Marella returned to make the save. On June 9 at Against All Odds, Dango unsuccessfully challenged Hendry for the Impact Digital Media Championship.

On June 14, at Against All Odds, Dirty Dango allied himself with The System after costing the Nemeth Brothers (Nic and Ryan Nemeth) their tag team title shot against Brian Myers and Eddie Edwards, after which he changed his name to Johnny "Dango" Curtis (JDC). On the November 13, 2025 edition of Impact!, JDC announced that he would retire from in-ring competition at Genesis on January 17, 2026. On December 5 at Final Resolution, JDC fought Frankie Kazarian for the TNA World Championship in a losing effort. At Genesis, JDC lost his retirement match to fellow System member and real-life friend Eddie Edwards. On the January 22, 2026 episode of Impact!, JDC introduced Bear Bronson as the newest member of the System. However, The System now also joined by Cedric Alexander would attack JDC and Moose kicking them out of the group.

In February 2026, it was reported that JDC had begun working as a producer for TNA.

=== Return to WWE (2025) ===
Hussey made a one-night appearance with WWE on the February 4, 2025 episode of NXT, using his Fandango theme, interrupting Lexis King. He challenged King to a match the following week, for the Heritage Cup, but was unsuccessful.

== Other media ==
As Fandango, he made his video game debut as a playable character in WWE 2K14 (as a downloadable character) and has since appeared in WWE 2K15, WWE 2K16, WWE 2K17, WWE 2K18, WWE 2K19, WWE 2K20, WWE 2K Battlegrounds, and WWE 2K22.

In 2023 Hussey was one of several former WWE superstars who appeared in the indie film A Night of Recovery, where he talked about his parents struggle with drug addiction.

=== Web ===
Year	Title	Role	Notes
2015	Swerved	Himself	3 episodes
2017	Southpaw Regional Wrestling	Chet Chetterfield	8 episodes, web series
2017	Superstar Ink	Himself	

== Personal life ==
On September 7, 2025, Hussey married his longtime girlfriend Emily Violet.

== Championships and accomplishments ==
- Eastern Wrestling Alliance
  - EWA Tag Team Championship (3 times) – with Kamikaze (2) and Brian Black (1)
- Florida Championship Wrestling
  - FCW Florida Tag Team Championship (2 times) – with Tyler Reks (1) and Derrick Bateman (1)
- Independent Connecticut Championship Wrestling
  - ICCW Connecticut Championship (1 time)
- Immortal Championship Wrestling
  - ICW Heavyweight Championship (1 time)
- Northeast Championship Wrestling
  - NCW New England Championship (1 time)
  - NCW Tag Team Championship (1 time) – with Damian Houston
- Power League Wrestling
  - PLW New England Championship (1 time)
- Premier Wrestling Federation
  - PWF Northeast Heavyweight Championship (2 times)
  - PWF Northeast Tag Team Championship (2 times) – with Kenn Phoenix
- Pro Wrestling Illustrated
  - Ranked no. 59 of the top 500 singles wrestlers in the PWI 500 in 2013
- South Coast Championship Wrestling
  - SCCW Lightweight Championship (1 time)
- Superstars Of Wrestling Federation
  - SWF Heavyweight Championship (1 time)
- Total Nonstop Action Wrestling
  - TNA Year End Awards (1 time)
    - Faction of the Year (2025) as The System
- WWE
  - NXT Tag Team Championship (1 time) – with Tyler Breeze
  - NXT (Season four)
