= PLW Tag Team Championship =

Professional wrestling tag team championship

Details
- Promotion: Power League Wrestling
- Date established: November 16, 1991
Statistics
- First champion: Brutal Brigade
- Most reigns: The Pillars of Power (4)
- Longest reign: Elements of Suicide (854 days)
- Shortest reign: Cain and Dave (<1)

The PLW Tag Team Championship is a professional wrestling championship in Power League Wrestling. It is the tag team championship of the PLW promotion, and one of three championship titles.

Overall, there have been 35 reigns among 28 teams. The inaugural champions were The Brutal Brigade ("Brutal" Bob Evans and Maniacal Mark), who defeated Darkside (Shawn Williams and Brian Flynn) in a tournament final on November 16, 1991, to become the first PLW Tag Team Champions. The Pillars of Power (Exterminator and Sub-Zero) hold the record for most reigns, with four. At 854 days, Elements of Suicide's (Onyx and Cinna) second reign is the longest in the title's history. Cain and Dave's (Cain the Executioner and Dave Brown) first and only reign was the shortest in the history of the title as they lost the belts back to their opponents on the same night.

== Title history ==
Key

#	Order in reign history
Reign	The reign number for the specific set of wrestlers listed
Event	The event in which the title was won
—	Used for vacated reigns so as not to count it as an official reign
N/A	The information is not available or is unknown
+	Indicates the current reign is changing daily

=== Reigns ===
As of January 1, 2016

#	Wrestlers	Reign	Date	Days held	Location	Event	Notes	Ref
1	The Brutal Brigade ("Brutal" Bob Evans and Maniacal Mark)	1	November 16, 1991	30	Swansea, Massachusetts	Power League Wrestling	Brutal Brigade defeated Darkside (Shawn Williams and Brian Flynn) in a tournament final to become the first PLW Tag Team Champions. Aired in November 1991 on tape delay.	
2	Darkside (Shawn Williams and Brian Flynn)	1	December 16, 1991	84	Swansea, Massachusetts	Power League Wrestling		
3	The Lightning Express (Dutch Davidson and Shane Simons)	1	March 9, 1992	N/A	Swansea, Massachusetts	Power League Wrestling		
3	Brian Flynn and The Shadow Warrior	1	April 1992	N/A	Swansea, Massachusetts	Power League Wrestling		
4	The Lightning Express	2	April 1992	N/A	El Paso, Texas	Power League Wrestling		
5	Maniacal Mark and Scott Z.	1	July 1992	N/A	Swansea, Massachusetts	Power League Wrestling		
—	Vacated	—	1992	—	—	Power League Wrestling	The championship is vacated after Scott Z. and Maniacal Mark won tournaments for the vacant Heavyweight and New England championships.	
6	The Lightning Express	3	October 18, 1992	59	Pawtucket, Rhode Island	Power League Wrestling	The Lightning Express defeated The Fall River Wrecking Crew in a tournament final to win the vacant title.	
7	Fall River Wrecking Crew ("Ruthless" Ryan Amaral and Jay A.)	1	December 16, 1992	130	Swansea, Massachusetts	Power League Wrestling	Blue Thunder substituted for Dutch Davidson.	
8	The S.W.A.T. Team (The Punisher and The Enforcer)	1	April 25, 1993	168	Pawtucket, Rhode Island	Power League Wrestling		
9	Deadly Alliance (Atomic Mark and H-Bomb)	1	October 10, 1993	126	Pawtucket, Rhode Island	Midnight Madness (1993)		
10	Cain and Dave (Cain the Executioner and Dave Brown)	1	February 13, 1994	0	Pawtucket, Rhode Island	Power League Wrestling		
11	Deadly Alliance (Atomic Mark and H-Bomb)	1	February 13, 1994	98	Pawtucket, Rhode Island	Power League Wrestling		
12	The S.W.A.T. Team	2	May 22, 1994	84	Pawtucket, Rhode Island	PowerFest (1994)	Shane Simons was guest referee.	
13	Destruction Crew (Mayhem and The Devastator)	1	August 14, 1994	112	Cranston, Rhode Island	Power League Wrestling		
14	Amazin' Jay and Exterminator	1	December 4, 1994	35	Cranston, Rhode Island	Power League Wrestling		
15	The Flawless Foundation (Max Knight and Scott Thomas)	1	January 8, 1995	336	Cranston, Rhode Island	Power League Wrestling		
16	The Pillars of Power (Exterminator and Sub-Zero)	1	December 10, 1995	364	Providence, Rhode Island	Power-House Brawl (1995)	Exterminator defeated The Flawless Foundation in a handicap match with the help of The Defenseman. Exterminator was allowed keep the title if he chose a partner. He picked Sub-Zero.	
17	Crush Force (Crusher and Alex Payne)	1	December 8, 1996	42	Central Falls, Rhode Island	Power-House Brawl (1996)	Awarded titles via forfeit.	
18	The Boston Bulldogs (Rip Morrison and Johnny Royal)	1	January 19, 1997	21	Warren, Rhode Island	The War In Warren	Awarded titles via forfeit.	
19	The Pillars of Power	2	February 9, 1997	132	Central Falls, Rhode Island	Live event	The Pillars of Power won the tag titles outside the ring. The Flawless One, their manager, filed a protest claiming the titles were wrongly taken away.	
20	Knights of the Realm (The Mighty Bosch and Daedilus Dimmak)	1	June 21, 1997	155	Pawtucket, Rhode Island	PowerFest (1997)	This was a Triangle match also involving Fryght (John 3:16 and Vertabreaker).	
21	The Pillars of Power	3	November 23, 1997	174	Warren, Rhode Island	Power-House Brawl (1997)	This was a Triangle match also involving Fryght (John 3:16 and Vertabreaker).	
22	Maniacal Mark and Don Juan de Santo	1	May 16, 1998	265	Woonsocket, Rhode Island	PowerFest (1998)		
23	The Pillars of Power	4	February 5, 1999	100	Woonsocket, Rhode Island	Live event	Dr. Heresy substituted for Maniacal Mark.	
24	Maniacal Mark and Don Juan de Santo	2	May 16, 1999	N/A	Warwick, Rhode Island	PowerFest (1999)	This was a Fatal Four-Way match also involving Knights of the Realm and Amazin' Jay and Vertabreaker. The team broke up when Don Juan de Santo won the PLW Heavyweight Championship.	
25	The Damned (Mad Dog and Draven)	1	March 2000	N/A	N/A	Power League Wrestling	The Damned were awarded the title after Draven traded the PLW New England Championship to Maniacal Mark in exchange for his half of the PLW Tag Team Championship.	
26	Elements of Suicide (Onyx and Cinna)	1	October 29, 2000	287	Scituate, Rhode Island	Live event	This was a Triple Threat match also involving Frankie Armadillo and Damian Houston.	
27	Jason the Slasher and The Mighty Moco	1	August 12, 2001	140	Cumberland, Rhode Island	Cumberlandfest (2001)		
28	Elements of Suicide	2	December 30, 2001	854	West Warwick, Rhode Island	Power-House Brawl (2001)	Paul Lauzon substituted for Jason the Slasher.	
29	Chris Blackheart and Don Vega	1	May 2, 2004	770	Brockton, Massachusetts	PowerFest (2004)		
30	Extreme Heat (Kid Pyro and Frank Blaze)	1	June 11, 2006	N/A	Warwick, Rhode Island	PowerFest (2006)	The previous incarnation of Extreme Heat consisted of Kid Pyro and AK Fuego. This pairing defeated Blackheart and Don Vega to win the tag team title.	
—	Vacated	—	2007	—	—	N/A	When AK Fuego announced he was moving to Florida, Kid Pyro was allowed to replace Fuego with a partner of his choice. Pyro was asked to vacate the titles when he was unable to find a replacement.	
31	Matt Storm and Mr. Munroe	1	May 31, 2009	413	Pawtucket, Rhode Island	PowerFest (2009)	This was a Fatal Four-Way match also involving The Air Devils (Anthony Stone and Brandon Webb), The Baker Boys (Brickhouse and David Baker) and Impact Inc. (Jose Perez and Kevin Karizma).	
32	The McGraws (Masky, Mini and Uncle Ulysses McGraw)	1	July 18, 2010	691	East Providence, Rhode Island	Great Outdoors Tour (2010)	This was a 6-man tag team match also involving T.J. Richter. The championship is subsequently defended under the Freebird rule.	
33	Matt Storm and T.J. Richter	1	June 8, 2012	345	Pawtucket, Rhode Island	PowerFest (2012)		
34	Anthony Greene and Rob Araujo	1	May 19, 2013	448	Pawtucket, Rhode Island	PowerFest (2013)		
35	The Glamorous Express (Buddy Romano and Mike Paiva)	1	August 10, 2014	509	Cumberland, Rhode Island	Cumberlandfest (2014)	Christian Casanova substituted for Anthony Greene.	

== List of combined reigns ==
As of April 22, 2016.

Symbol	Meaning
(-)	The reign is shorter than one day.

Rank	Team	No. of reigns	Combined days
1	Onyx and Cinna (Elements of Suicide)	2	1,141
2	Exterminator and Sub-Zero (The Pillars of Power)	4	770
3	Chris Blackheart and Don Vega	1	770
4	Masky, Mini and Uncle Ulysses McGraw (The McGraws)	1	691
5	Buddy Romano and Mike Paiva (The Glamorous Express)	1	621+
6	Anthony Greene and Rob Araujo	1	448
7	Matt Storm and Mr. Munroe	1	413
8	Matt Storm and T.J. Richter	1	345
9	Max Knight and Scott Thomas (The Flawless Foundation)	1	336
10	Maniacal Mark and Don Juan de Santo	2	265
11	The Punisher and The Enforcer (The S.W.A.T. Team)	2	252
12	Atomic Mark and H-Bomb (The Deadly Alliance)	2	224
13	Mad Dog and Draven (The Damned)		212
14	The Mighty Bosch and Daedilus Dimmak (Knights of the Realm)	1	155
15	Jason the Slasher and The Mighty Moco	1	144
16	"Ruthless" Ryan Amaral and Jay A. (Fall River Wrecking Crew)	1	130
17	Mayhem and The Devastator (Destruction Crew)	1	112
18	Shawn Williams and Brian Flynn (Darkside)	1	84
19	Dutch Davidson and Shane Simons (The Lightning Express)	2	59
20	Crusher and Alex Payne (Crush Force)	1	42
21	Amazin' Jay and Exterminator	1	35
22	"Brutal" Bob Evans and Maniacal Mark (The Brutal Brigade)	1	30
23	Rip Morrison and Johnny Royal (The Boston Bulldogs)	1	21
24	Cain the Executioner and Dave Brown (Cain and Dave)	1	(-)
