= PLW Heavyweight Championship =

Professional wrestling championship

Details
- Promotion: Power League Wrestling
- Date established: November 18, 1991
Statistics
- First champion: Joe O.
- Most reigns: Scott Z. (4)
- Longest reign: Don Vega (1,239 days)
- Shortest reign: Gino Martino (<1)

The PLW Heavyweight Championship is a professional wrestling heavyweight championship in Power League Wrestling (PLW). It is the top championship of the PLW promotion, and one of two singles titles along with the PLW New England Championship. The inaugural champion was "The Fighter" Joe O., who defeated The Shadow Warrior in a tournament final on November 18, 1991, to become the first PLW Heavyweight Champion. Scott Z. holds the record for most reigns, with four. At 1,239 days, "Punisher" Don Vega's first and only reign is the longest in the title's history. Gino Martino's only reign was the shortest in the history of the title as he gave the belt to manager Scott Knight immediately after winning it. Overall, there have been 36 reigns shared between 27 wrestlers with nine vacancies.

== Title history ==
Key

#	Order in reign history
Reign	The reign number for the specific set of wrestlers listed
Event	The event in which the title was won
—	Used for vacated reigns so as not to count it as an official reign
N/A	The information is not available or is unknown
+	Indicates the current reign is changing daily

=== Reigns ===
As of January 1, 2016

#	Wrestlers	Reign	Date	Days held	Location	Event	Notes	Ref
1	Joe O.	1	November 18, 1991	84	Swansea, Massachusetts	Power League Wrestling	Joe O. defeated The Shadow Warrior in a tournament final to become the first PLW Heavyweight Champion.	
2	Storm Kelly	1	February 10, 1992	N/A	Swansea, Massachusetts	Power League Wrestling	Kelly won the title after secretly switching places with masked wrestler The Shadow Warrior during a Best 2-of-3 Falls match. Kelly unmasked immediately afterwards and claimed to have wrestled the entire match.	
—	Vacated	—	February 1992	—	—	Power League Wrestling	Kelly was stripped of the title by PLW President Pinky Johnson due to the controversy surrounding the title change. This aired February 1992.	
3	Ryan Amaral	1	March 9, 1992	N/A	Swansea, Massachusetts	PowerFest (1992)	Amaral defeated "Brutal" Bob Evans in a tournament final to win the vacant title.	
—	Vacated	—	April 1992	—	—	Power League Wrestling	Amaral was stripped of the title by PLW President Pinky Johnson due to the champion using excessive violence against Bob Evans at PowerFest 1992. This aired April 1992.	
4	The Shadow Warrior	1	May 1992	N/A	Swansea, Massachusetts	Trials and Tribulations Tournament	The Shadow Warrior defeated Joe O. in a tournament final to win the vacant title.	
5	Scott Z.	1	September 27, 1992	70	Pawtucket, Rhode Island	Power League Wrestling		
6	Hurricane Harvey	1	December 6, 1992	10	Pawtucket, Rhode Island	Power League Wrestling		
—	Vacated	—	December 1992	—	N/A	Power League Wrestling	Hurricane Harvey surrendered the title after being injured in a car accident.	
7	Scott Z.	2	December 16, 1992	70	Swansea, Massachusetts	Power League Wrestling	Scott Z. defeated The Defenseman in a singles match to win the vacant title; The Defenseman had previously won a 12-man battle royal to face Scott Z. for the title.	
8	Joe O.	2	February 24, 1993	35	Swansea, Massachusetts	Power League Wrestling		
9	Scott Z.	3	March 31, 1993	46	Swansea, Massachusetts	Power League Wrestling		
10	Bob Evans	1	May 16, 1993	N/A	Pawtucket, Rhode Island	Power League Wrestling		
—	Vacated	—	June 1993	—	N/A	Power League Wrestling	Evans surrendered the title upon leaving the promotion.	
11	Maniacal Mark	1	June 30, 1993	165	Pawtucket, Rhode Island	Power League Wrestling	Maniacal Mark defeated Sub-Zero in a tournament final to win the vacant title. Sub-Zero was a last minute substitute for Scott Z. who had injured his knee prior to the match; according to the pre-match stipulations, Scott Z. would have been awarded the title had Sub-Zero won the match.	
12	Amazin' Jay	1	December 12, 1993	231	Pawtucket, Rhode Island	Power League Wrestling		
13	Scott Z.	4	July 31, 1994	105	Cranston, Rhode Island	Power League Wrestling		
14	The Punisher	1	November 13, 1994	118	Providence, Rhode Island	Power League Wrestling		
15	Sub-Zero	1	March 11, 1995	274	Cranston, Rhode Island	Power League Wrestling		
16	Amazin' Jay	2	December 10, 1995	201	Providence, Rhode Island	Power-House Brawl (1995)		
17	T.J. Richter	1	June 28, 1996	205	Pawtucket, Rhode Island	PowerFest (1996)	Richter was disguised as Knightmare, Jay's scheduled opponent, and revealed his indenity after the match.	
18	Shane Simons	1	January 19, 1997	119	Warren, Rhode Island	The War In Warren		
—	Vacated	—	May 18, 1997	—	Newport, Rhode Island	Live event	Simons surrenders the championship due to injury.	
19	Jason the Slasher	1	May 18, 1997	34	Newport, Rhode Island	Live event	Jason the Slasher defeated Amazin' Jay, Bob Evans, Maniacal Mark, Paul Lauzon, and T.J. Richter in a Pier 6 Brawl match to win the vacant title.	
20	Derek Molhan	1	June 21, 1997	357	Pawtucket, Rhode Island	PowerFest (1997)	This was a steel cage match.	
21	The Universal Soldier	1	June 13, 1998	286	Manville, Rhode Island	Slammin' for Zachary		
22	Gino Martino	1	March 26, 1999	0	Pawtucket, Rhode Island	Live event		
—	Vacated	—	March 26, 1999	—	Pawtucket, Rhode Island	Live event	Immediately after winning the title from The Universal Soldier, Martino turned the title over to Scott Knight; PLW officials nullified this decision, and vacated the title.	
23	Paul Lauzon	1	May 16, 1999	N/A	Warwick, Rhode Island	PowerFest (1999)	Paul Lauzon defeated The Universal Soldier in a singles match to win the vacant title.	
—	Vacated	—	August 1999	—	N/A	N/A	Lauzon surrendered the title upon retiring.	
24	Don Juan de Santo	1	August 29, 1999	384	Manville, Rhode Island	Live event	Don Juan de Santo defeated T.J. Richter in a tournament final to win the vacant title.	
25	Dr. Heresy	1	September 16, 2000	470	Providence, Rhode Island	Jalen Noon-Coulbourn Benefit Show	This was a Triple Threat match also involving Chris Venom.	
26	Johnny Angel	1	December 30, 2001	140	West Warwick, Rhode Island	Power-House Brawl (2001)		
—	Vacated	—	May 19, 2002	—	Central Falls, Rhode Island	PowerFest (2002)	The championship is vacated by PLW Commissioner Derek Molhan when Johnny Angel is unable to appear for a scheduled title defense at PowerFest 2002.	
27	Dr. Heresy	2	May 19, 2002	714	Central Falls, Rhode Island	PowerFest (2002)	Dr. Heresy defeated Johnny Curtis, Derik Destiny, Kid Krazy, Manical Mark, Kenn Phoenix, Shane Simons, and Don Vega in a Pier 8 Brawl match to win the vacant title.	
28	Derik Destiny	1	May 2, 2004	510	Brockton, Massachusetts	PowerFest (2004)		
29	Jason the Slasher	2	September 24, 2005	603	Pawtucket, Rhode Island	Live event		
30	Chris Blackheart	1	May 20, 2007	350	West Warwick, Rhode Island	PowerFest (2007)		
31	Don Vega	1	May 4, 2008	1,239	West Warwick, Rhode Island	PowerFest (2008)		
—	Vacated	—	September 25, 2011	—	Plainville, Massachusetts	Great Outdoors Tour (2011)	The championship is vacated by PLW President Tom James due to Vega being unable to defend the title due to injury.	
32	Scott Levesque	1	September 25, 2011	322	Plainville, Massachusetts	Great Outdoors Tour (2011)	Levesque defeated "English Lion" Eddie Ryan in a singles match to win the vacant title.	
33	J. T. Dunn	1	August 12, 2012	280	Cumberland, Rhode Island	Cumberlandfest (2012)		
34	Scott Levesque	2	May 19, 2013	133	Pawtucket, Rhode Island	PowerFest (2013)		
35	Matt Storm	1	September 29, 2013	573	Plainville, Massachusetts	Great Outdoors Tour (2013)		
36	Scott Levesque	3	April 25, 2015	251	Glocester, Rhode Island	PowerFest (2015)		

== List of combined reigns ==
Symbol	Meaning
(-)	The reign is shorter than one day.

Rank	Wrestler	No. of reigns	Combined days
1	Don Vega	1	1,239
2	Dr. Heresy	2	1,184
3	Jason the Slasher	2	637
4	Matt Storm	1	573
5	Scott Levesque	3	556+
6	Derik Destiny	1	510
7	Amazin' Jay	2	432
8	Don Juan de Santo	1	384
9	Derek Molhan	1	357
10	Chris Blackheart	1	350
11	Scott Z.	4	291
12	The Universal Soldier	1	286
13	J. T. Dunn	1	280
14	Sub-Zero	1	274
15	T.J. Richter	1	205
15	Maniacal Mark	1	165
17	Johnny Angel	1	140
18	Shane Simons	1	119
18	Joe O.	2	119
20	The Punisher	1	118
21	Hurricane Harvey	1	<10
22	Gino Martino	1	<1
