= Our Lady of Fatima High School =

Location
- 360 Market Street; Warren, (Bristol County), Rhode Island 02885; United States; 41°44′47″N 71°16′30″W

Information
- Type: Private, Coeducational
- Religious affiliation: Roman Catholic
- Established: 1965
- Closed: 2012
- Oversight: Sisters of St. Dorothy
- Grades: 7–12
  - Grade 7: 14
  - Grade 8: 9
  - Grade 9: 47
  - Grade 10: 35
  - Grade 11: 34
  - Grade 12: 42
- Average class size: 17
- Colors: Royal Blue and White
- Team name: Tigers
- Accreditation: New England Association of Schools and Colleges
- Tuition: $9,400
- Affiliation: National Catholic Educational Association (NCEA)
- Admissions Director: Sister Lisa Palazio
- Athletic Director: Joseph Parenteau
- Website: Official website

Our Lady of Fatima High School (FATIMA) was a Catholic, co-educational school in Warren, Rhode Island, operated by the Roman Catholic Diocese of Providence.

== History ==
Sister Virginia Bento and the members of her council chose to establish in Warren, Bristol County because they perceived a need for a girls' high school in this area. As a Catholic Institution, FATIMA would provide a solid academic foundation for its students in preparation for college, and help them to strengthen their faith to become Christian leaders in the tradition of St. Paula Frassinetti, foundress of the Sisters of St. Dorothy.

FATIMA opened on September 8, 1965 with 55 students. At that time, the school building consisted of classrooms (one of which was converted into a chapel), a library, science and art laboratories, and a double room to be used for several purposes. The school also served as housing for the sisters who were members of the staff. The gymnasium and cafeteria were completed in 1969, in time for the first graduation ceremonies while the convent was ready for occupancy in 1977.

As a private institution, owned and operated by the Sisters of St. Dorothy, all funding for the school was provided by them. The principals have been Sisters, J. Sousa, Isabel Borg-Cardona, Mary Ann Campanelli, Lillian Cravinho, Eileen Egan and Mary Margaret Souza. The faculty originally consisted only of religious sisters. After a brief period of time, a layman was hired to teach social studies and physical education.

Since its opening, courses have been modernized, including the addition of a computer lab and a full-time computer teacher. On top of that, grades 7 and 8 were added to the school.

In 1985, the 20th anniversary of the foundation of the school, and the year that the foundress of the sisters of St. Dorothy was canonized, FATIMA became co-educational. This decision was made primarily because of the declining enrollment rate.

The school closed in 2012. Highlander Charter School moved into the building in 2014.
