= EWA Heavyweight Championship =

Details
- Promotion: Eastern Wrestling Alliance
- Date established: September 1997
- Current champion: Ace Romero
- Date won: July 25th, 2026
Statistics
- First champion: Rick Fuller
- Most reigns: Maverick Wild (3)
- Longest reign: Alex Cypher (794 days)
- Shortest reign: Mikaze (<1 day)

The EWA Heavyweight Championship is a professional wrestling heavyweight championship in the Eastern Wrestling Alliance (EWA). It has been defended throughout the New England region since its introduction in 1998, specifically, in Connecticut, Maine, Massachusetts, New Hampshire, and Rhode Island.

The inaugural champion was "Big" Rick Fuller, who was awarded the championship after winning a battle royal by the promotion's executive committee to become the first EWA Heavyweight Champion. The EWA Heavyweight Championship is an intergender championship, with the first and currently only women holding the championship being Master Sandy who won it in August of 1998 and held it for close to a year. Maverick Wild holds the record for most reigns, with three. Seven people have held the championship more than once, in chronological order those being: Dave Vicious(2), Alexander Worthington III(2), Dr. Reginald Heresy(2), Maverick Wild(3), Mikaze(2), 23 Hazard(2), and Ace Romero(2). At 794 days, Alex Cypher's is the longest reign in the championship's history. Mikaze's second reign was the shortest in the history of the championship after he lost it to Sean Burke moments after winning the vacant championship. Overall, there have been 28 reigns shared between twenty wrestlers with seven vacancies.

== Title history ==
Key

#	Order in reign history
Reign	The reign number for the specific set of wrestlers listed
Event	The event in which the title was won
—	Used for vacated reigns so as not to count it as an official reign
N/A	The information is not available or is unknown

=== Reigns ===
#	Wrestlers	Reign	Date	Days held	Location	Event	Notes	Ref.
1	Rick Fuller	1	September 1997	145	Lewiston, Maine	Live event	Fuller won a battle royal to become the first EWA Heavyweight Champion.	
2	Tony Atlas	1	January 24, 1998	196	Lewiston, Maine	Live event		
3	Master Sandy	1	August 8, 1998	301	Lewiston, Maine	Live event	First woman to hold the EWA Heavyweight Championship.	
4	Kentaro-san	1	June 5, 1999	113	Lewiston, Maine	Live event	Awarded title after Sandy accidentally hit EWA Vice President Dan Mason with the belt. Her opponent unmasks revealing himself as manager "The Iron Chef".	
5	Dave Vicious	1	September 26, 1999	146	Portland, Maine	Live event		
6	Alexander Worthington III	1	February 19, 2000	112	Lewiston, Maine	Live event		
—	Vacated	—	June 10, 2000	—	Wakefield, Massachusetts	Live event	The championship is vacated when Worthington suffers an injury.	
7	Dave Vicious	2	June 10, 2000	230	Wakefield, Massachusetts	Live event	Defeated Alex Arion and Don Juan DeSanto for vacant title.	
—	Vacated	—	January 26, 2001	—	Portland, Maine	Live event	The championship is vacated when Vicious suffers an injury.	
8	Alexander Worthington III	2	February 19, 2001	131	Lewiston, Maine	Live event		
9	Dr. Reginald Heresy	1	June 30, 2001	258	Portland, Maine	Live event		
10	Adam Booker	1	March 15, 2002	322	Portland, Maine	Live event	This was a three-way match including Frankie Armadillo.	
11	R. J. Brewer	1	January 31, 2003	22	Southbridge, Massachusetts	Live event	Walters was also the then reigning EWA New England Champion.	
—	Vacated	—	February 22, 2003	—	Portland, Maine	Live event	The championship is vacated when Walters was stripped of the title.	
12	Steve Ramsey	1	March 22, 2003	21	South Portland, Maine	Live event	Defeated John Walters to win the vacant title.	
13	Dr. Reginald Heresy	2	April 12, 2003	146	South Portland, Maine	Live event		
14	Maverick Wild	1	September 5, 2003	148	Southbridge, Massachusetts	Live event		
15	Antonio Thomas	1	January 31, 2004	20	Ludlow, Massachusetts	Live event		
16	Cueball	1	February 20, 2004	281	Southbridge, Massachusetts	Live event		
17	Maverick Wild	2	November 27, 2004	119	Holyoke, Massachusetts	Live event		
18	Mighty Mini	1	March 26, 2005	37	Holyoke, Massachusetts	Live event		
—	Vacated	—	May 2, 2005	—	N/A	N/A	The championship is vacated when the promotion goes on a near-year long hiatus.	
19	Maverick Wild	3	March 4, 2006	742	Orange, Massachusetts	Live event	This was a 30-man battle royal which Maverick Wild won by last eliminating Dr. Heresy.	
20	Mikaze	1	March 15, 2008	384	Orange, Massachusetts	Live event		
—	Vacated	—	April 2009	—	N/A	N/A	The championship is vacated when the promotion goes on a near-year long hiatus.	
21	Domenic Simone	1	November 27, 2010	160	Feeding Hills, Massachusetts	Live event	Defeated William King in a tournament final to win the vacant title. The belt was stolen by the previous champion, Mikaze, and retained the physical belt for the next three months. Simone finally regained the title from Mikaze in a street fight match in Feeding Hills on March 19, 2011.	
—	Vacated	—	May 6, 2011	—	Feeding Hills, Massachusetts	Live event	The championship is vacated when Simone suffers a wrist injury. A battle royal is held in the main event later that night to decide a new champion. When the final two entrants, Mikaze and Sebastian Reese, are both eliminated EWA Senior Official Mike Crockett orders that the title will be decided in a singles match between both men.	
22	Mikaze	2	June 25, 2011	0	Feeding Hills, Massachusetts	Live event	Defeated Sebastian Reese to win the vacant title.	
23	Sean Burke	1	June 25, 2011	322	Feeding Hills, Massachusetts	Live event		
24	Alex Cypher	1	May 12, 2012	794	Springfield, Massachusetts	Live event		
—	Vacated	—		—	Springfield, Massachusetts	—	The EWA went dormant until EWA-Maine re-established the brand in November of 2023.	
25	23 Hazard	1	December 14, 2024	336	Saco, Maine	Live event	Hazard entered number 22 and won a 25 person 'Nightmare for the Gold' match to become the new EWA heavyweight champion - an over-the-top rumble match where the final two go immediately into a singles match with the winner determined by pin fall or submission.	
26	Ace Romero	1	November 15, 2025	77	Saco, Maine	Live event	Defeated 23 Hazard in a singles match	
27	23 Hazard	2	January 31st, 2026	175	Saco, Maine	Live event	Defeated Ace Romero in a Saco Street Fight	
28	Ace Romero	2	July 25th, 2026	15	Saco, Maine	Live event	Defeated 23 Hazard in a Ladder Match	
