= Manville, Rhode Island =

Village in Lincoln, Rhode Island, U.S.

Coordinates: 41°58′11″N 71°28′25″W

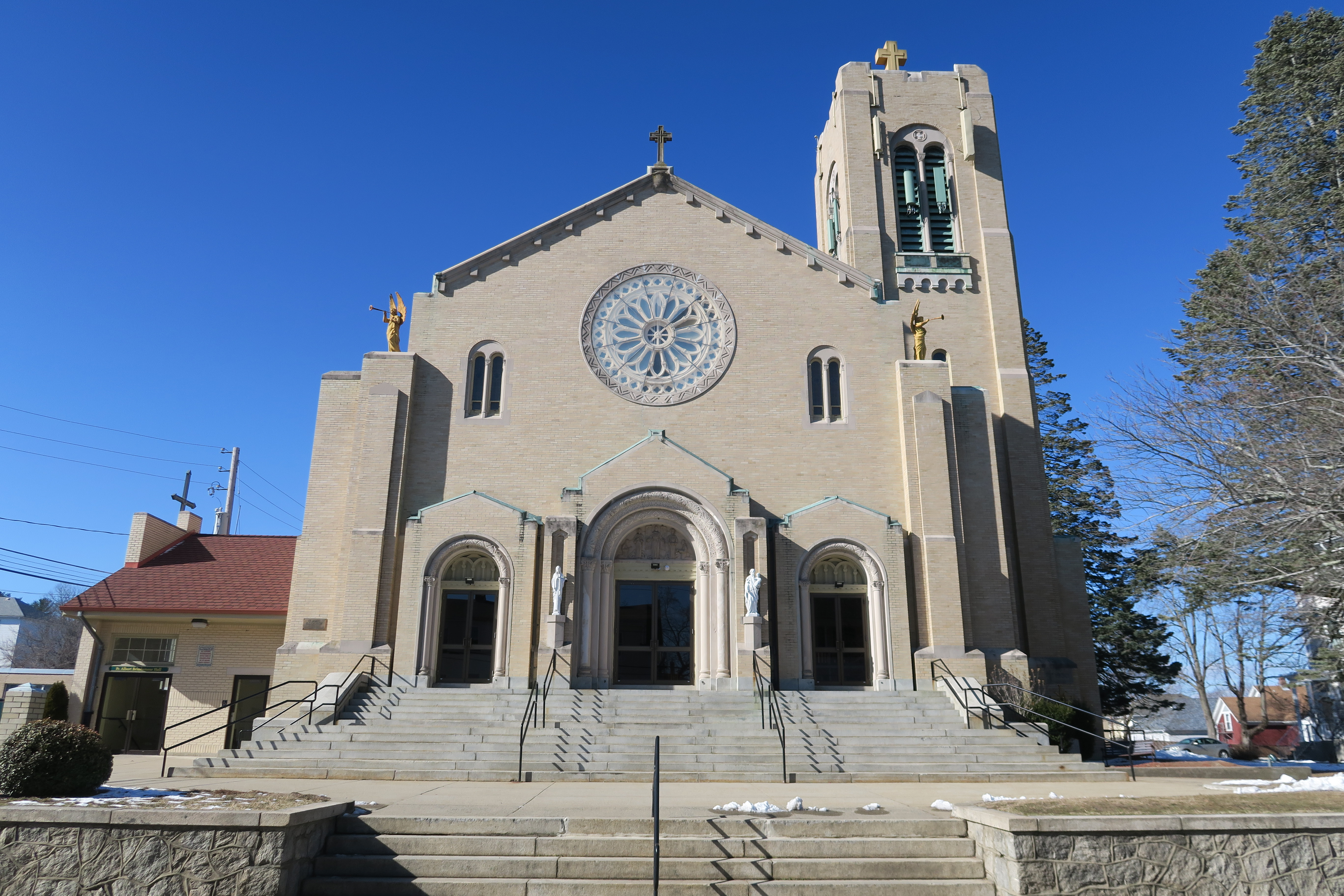
Saint James Church

Manville is a village in the town of Lincoln, Rhode Island, United States. It is located at latitude 41.9616° North, longitude 71.4744° West. It has been assigned the ZIP Code 02838.

Manville is a mill village that lies along the Blackstone River. Northern Lincoln Elementary School is located in Manville. The village is known for the former Manville-Jenckes Mills that burned down on September 12, 1955. The mill was a popular place to work in the village. Several row houses were constructed by mill owners to house their workers in the early 1900s. These row houses are known to the residents of Manville as "the Brick Blocks", as well as the "Murnighan Mile".

The village sports several businesses, including the Harmony Cafe, Early Birds Diner, Manville Palace Pizza, Chennai Tiffins Indian Restaurant, Manville Market (now the Joint on the Corner), Ernie's Auto Repair, One Stop Liquors, The Enrico Caruso Club, 4th Generation Salon, The Table Tennis Association of RI, The Coffee Cubby, and a Navigant Credit Union branch.

== See also ==
- History of Emmanuel Episcopal Church
- Blackstone Valley
