= Pat Buck =

American professional wrestler (born 1984)

Personal information
- Born: Patrick Buckridge; December 24, 1984 (age 41) Queens, New York, U.S.

Professional wrestling career
- Ring name(s): The Buck; Muncie Magee; Pat Buck; Pat Cena; Platinum "Precious"; Ru Starr
- Billed height: 6 ft 0 in (1.83 m)
- Billed weight: 220 lb (100 kg)
- Billed from: Detroit Rock City; Queens, New York
- Trained by: Ohio Valley Wrestling
- Debut: 2001

Patrick Buckridge (born December 24, 1984), better known by the ring name Pat Buck, is an American professional wrestler and promoter, He is signed to All Elite Wrestling (AEW) as the Vice President of Talent Development and as a coach. He currently competes for several promotions on the independent circuit, including New England Championship Wrestling (NECW), New York Wrestling Connection (NYWC) and Limitless Wrestling. Buckridge was a co-owner of the Pro Wrestling Syndicate (PWS) promotion. Buck is the owner and operator of WrestlePro. In 2014, Buck and Curt Hawkins opened the Create A Pro Wrestling Academy. He was previously signed to WWE, where he worked as a producer and on-screen official.

== Professional wrestling career ==
=== Early career ===
Buckridge's early career from 2001 to 2005 was under the ring name "Ru Starr" and spent in firstly New York Wrestling Connection and then simultaneously in New England Championship Wrestling (NECW).

=== Ohio Valley Wrestling ===
==== Debut (2005–2006) ====
Entering Ohio Valley Wrestling (OVW) in November 2005 and adopting the new ring name of "Pat Buck", he faced Mark Henry in his first OVW appearance and lost to him in less than a minute. Early the next year, Buck lost matches to Elijah Burke, Ryan Reeves and Mikey Batts. On March 11, he also lost to Jack Bull in a six-way match involving Discord, Charles Evans, Luis Almodovar and Mikey Batts. That same month, Buck began wrestling as The Erotic Erraticator whose ring style and in-ring persona was modeled after Adrian Adonis.

Teaming with Robbie Dawber and Jack Bull, Buck faced teams including The Highlanders, The Riggs Brothers and Cody Runnels and Elijah Burke in dark matches on OVW television. On June 5, he and Shawn Spears unsuccessfully took on Roadkill and Chet the Jet. Two weeks later at a June 16 Six Flags Show, he teamed with Jack Bull, Rahim, and Deuce 'n Domino in a 10-man tag team match against Cody Runnels, Kasey James, Roadkill, Mo, and Chet the Jet. Buck's team lost when he was pinned by Roadkill.

During the next two months, he teamed with Jack Bull and Shad Gaspard and also lost to Chet the Jet, Mike Mizanin and Chuck Evans in single matches. On July 12, he and Shawn Spears lost to The Untouchables and to Charles Evans a week later at separate OVW television tapings. On August 5, he defeated Scott Cardinal and, at a Six Flags Show several days later, he participated in an 18-man battle royal including Bull, Gaspard, Burke, Lennox Lightfoot, Ranger Milton, Rod Steele, Eddie Craven III, Mike Kruel, Shawn Osborne, Jon Bolen, Neighborhoodie, Seth Skyfire, Johnny Punch, Los Locos and The Untouchables.

==== Gothic Mayhem (2006–2007) ====
During the summer of 2006, Buck formed Gothic Mayhem with Johnny Punch. Much like Stevie Richards' parody of KISS in Extreme Championship Wrestling (ECW) during the mid-1990s, the team was styled after Twisted Sister. Both sporting mohawks and carrying electric guitars to the ring, they were followed by valets Melody and Roni Jonah as part of their entourage. Buck donned himself the "Platinum Frontman", and developed a persona mimicking Axl Rose. The two made their debut defeating Los Locos at the Davis Arena on August 16. They lost, however, to Bad Company (Eddie Craven and Mike Kruel), High Dosage (Ryan Reeves and Jon Bolen) and OVW Southern Tag Team Champions Cody Runnels and Shawn Spears. Buck also lost to Devin Driscoll, Steve Lewington, Paul Birchill, Christopher Rombola and Boris Alexiev in single matches.

On January 10, 2007, he and Johnny Punch lost to Terminal Velocity (Chett the Jet and Lewington) in a four-way match including Los Locos and The Untouchables at an OVW television taping. Feuding with Rombola later that month, they defeated Rombola and his partner Jake Hager on January 27. Weeks later at a February 14 OVW television taping, they met Rombola in a "Battle of the Bands" which ended when Pat Buck smashed a guitar over Rombola's head. The team continued fight in matches against Kofi Nahaje Kingston and Harry Smith and Terminal Velocity. In a match to decide the number one contender to the OVW Southern Tag Team Championship, they lost to Charles "The Hammer" Evans and Justin "The Ox" LaRoche in a four-way match with Terminal Velocityn and Belgian Brawler and Nicholas Sinn on March 7. Although losing matches to Terminal Velocity over the next few weeks, he and Johnny Punch teamed with Tony Braddock to beat TJ Dalton, Jamin Olivencia and Mike Hutter in a six-man tag team match. They also feuded with The Major Brothers during most of May and early June.

On July 4, Buck was scheduled to face Cody Runnels but the match was canceled when Runnels was attacked backstage by Shawn Spears earlier during the show. Buck also lost to Atlas DaBone, Jay Bradley and Vladimir Kozlov during the year as well as making a brief appearance in Derby City Wrestling. On October 10, Gothic Mayhem lost to Los Locos in a qualifying match to enter a championship tournament for the OVW Southern Tag Team Championship. The two wrestled their last match together against The Major Brothers on November 7. Buck teamed with Ryan Reeves in a match against OVW Southern Tag Team Champions Colt Cabana and Shawn Spears the following week.

==== Tag Team Champion (2008–2009) ====
In early 2008, Buck worked single matches with Charles Evans, Drew McIntyre, Kevin Thorn and Rob Conway. After his recent loss to Conway, his opponent suggested he toughen himself up by becoming a "man of iron" like himself. Buck took his advice literally making his debut as "The Man of Iron", Conway's own name, and defeated Lennox Lightfoot ending his four-month losing streak. Forming The Men of Iron with Conway during the summer, they captured the OVW Southern Tag Team Championship from 'The Insurgency (Ali and Omar Akbar) in Louisville on May 27. Successfully defending the titles against The Insurgency during a series of matches held at Six Flags Kentucky Kingdom, they held the championship for two months before losing to Darriel Kelly and Josh Lowry in a four corners match with The Insurgency and Dirty Money on August 6.

In early 2009, Buck formed a team known as Top Shelf Talent with J.D. Maverick. In their first match as a team, they defeated Tony Mann and Hog Wild. They continued to wrestle teams including Knuckles and Knives (Johnny Punch and Rudy Switchblade) and Tilo and Shiloh for the next few months. On April 22, Top Shelf Talent defeated Fang and Igotta Brewski and Totally Awesome (Sucio and Kamikaze Kid) in a three-way match to win the OVW Southern Tag Team Championship. The pair held the championship for 49 days, before losing it to Totally Awesome on June 10.

=== Later years (2009–2016) ===
On the December 25, 2009, episode of WWE SmackDown, Buck was featured in a jobber tag team along with Bryce Andrews, losing to Cryme Tyme.

Patrick relocated to Tampa, Florida to work with FCW upon news that WWE was ending their partnership with OVW in 2009. Upon arrival, Patrick became a referee for the promotion working all live events and television, until he left in 2010.

Patrick was part of the crowd funded WRP project by Jeff Katz in 2011 playing the character of “Liberal Redneck” Muncie McGee. The project featured a steady cast of talent, but the project never saw the light of day.

Buck became the head trainer at the New York Wrestling Connection school in 2010, but left in early 2011 after a dispute with management. He then debuted for Pro Wrestling Syndicate (PWS). Teaming with John Silver as "The Lone Rangers" and being managed by Opie and Anthony's Sam Roberts, the duo defeated The Urban Legends for the tag team championship on August 20, 2011, in Ronkonkoma, New York. In 2012, Buck became the co-owner of PWS, alongside Eric Tapout.

In 2012, Patrick opened a wrestling school called Create A Pro. He is the sole owner of the Create A Pro NJ school, and full partner of Curt Hawkins for the Create A Pro NY school (opened 2014). Notable students include MJF and Kris Stadtlander. Create A Pro Students are regularly used for WWE, NXT, and Impact.

Buck became a producer and show timer for Impact Wrestling in 2018. He produced and competed in Impact's Ultimate X Match for the “United We Stand” event in New Jersey during Wrestlemania 35 weekend.

In 2016 Buck Became the sole owner of WrestlePro. Patrick successfully brought WrestlePro to Anchorage, Alaska in 2019 at the Sullivan Arena. The main event featured MJF vs Joey Janela vs Pat Buck. Mick Foley was special enforcer.

=== WWE (2019–2022) ===
On August 7, 2019, Buck announced that he had signed with WWE as a backstage producer. He was furloughed on April 15, 2020, due to COVID-19 cutbacks with an expected furlough end date of July 1, 2020. A few months later, he was rehired. On the July 27 episode of Raw, Buck was involved in a brawl between Shayna Baszler and Nia Jax where he tried to separate the two but was attacked by Jax. The following week on Raw, Buck announced that Jax was indefinitely suspended for assaulting him before being once again attacked by Jax.

On April 4, 2022, it was reported that Buck resigned from WWE, just following WrestleMania 38.

=== All Elite Wrestling (2022–present) ===
On April 14, 2022, only ten days after his WWE resignation, it was reported Pat Buck had signed with All Elite Wrestling as a coach. On August 3, 2022, Buck was named the Vice President of Talent Development. Buck was reportedly suspended after being involved in a fight between CM Punk, Ace Steel, Kenny Omega and The Young Bucks following the 2022 All Out media scrum, but that suspension was lifted after an investigation found that he was only attempting to break up the fight.

== Championships and accomplishments ==
- Create A Pro Wrestling Academy
  - CAP Championship (1 time)
- DDT Pro-Wrestling
  - Ironman Heavymetalweight Championship (1 time)
- New York Wrestling Connection
  - NYWC Heavyweight Championship (1 time)
  - NYWC Interstate Championship (1 time)
  - NYWC Tag Team Championship (2 times) – with Tyler Payne (1) and Wayne (1)
- New England Championship Wrestling
  - NECW Television Championship (1 time)
- Ohio Valley Wrestling
  - OVW Southern Tag Team Championship (2 times) – with JD Maverick (1) and Rob Conway (1)
- Pro Wrestling Illustrated
  - PWI ranked him #333 of the 500 best singles wrestlers in the PWI 500 in 2009
- Pro Wrestling Syndicate
  - PWS Tag Team Championship (2 times) – with John Silver
- WrestlePro
  - WP Tag Team Championship (1 time) – with Ryback
