= Bob Evans (wrestler) =

American professional wrestler

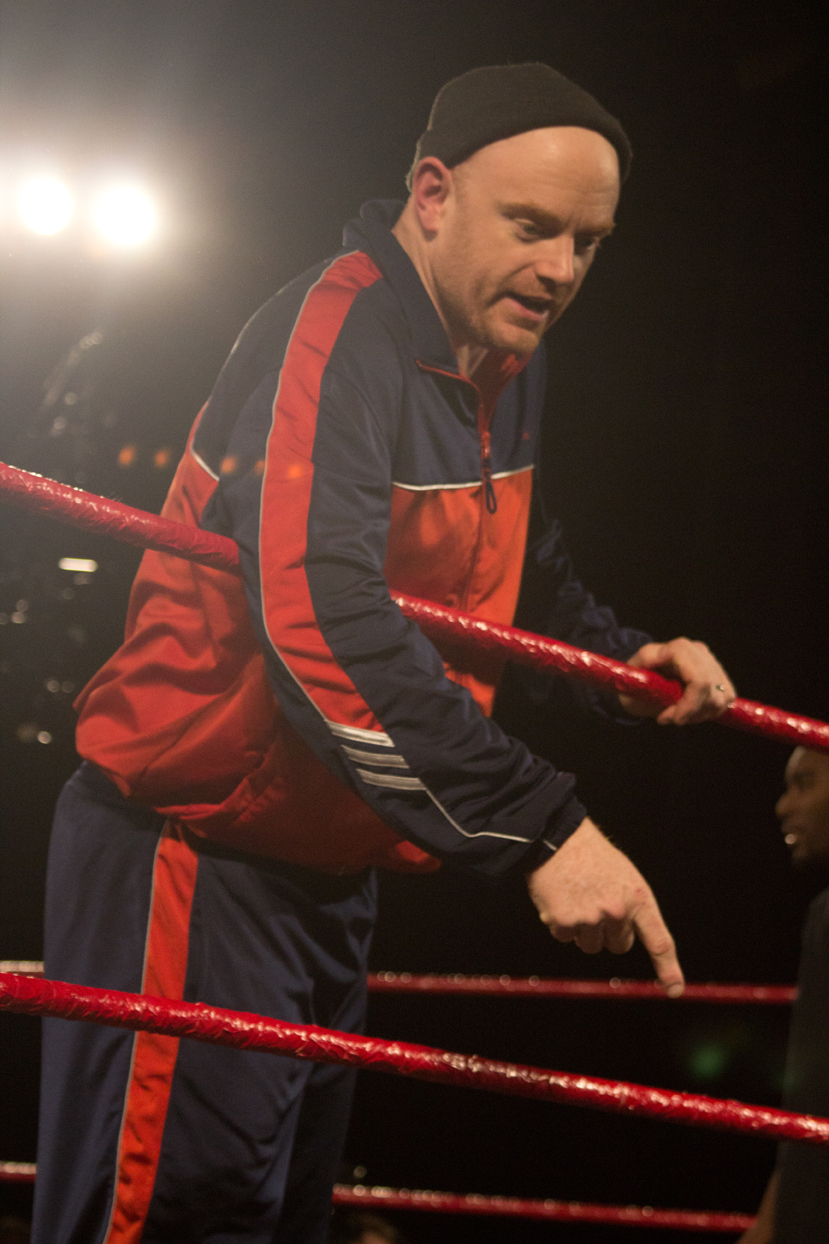
- Evans in the ring in 2012

Personal information
- Born: Robert Paul Evans, Jr. September 3, 1972 (age 53) Swansea, Massachusetts, U.S.

Professional wrestling career
- Ring name: "Brutal" Bob Evans
- Billed height: 6 ft 3 in (1.91 m)
- Billed weight: 243 lb (110 kg)
- Billed from: Swansea, Massachusetts
- Trained by: Gino Caruso; Jeff Costa
- Debut: April 4, 1992

Robert Paul Evans, Jr. (born September 3, 1972) is an American professional wrestler and trainer, best known for his work in Ring of Honor (ROH). He also wrestles for various independent circuits.

== Professional wrestling career ==
=== Independent circuit (1991–present) ===
In 1991, a year after graduating from Joseph Case High School in Swansea, Massachusetts, Evans debuted for Power League Wrestling. In November 1991, Evans and Maniacal Mark, collectively known as Brutal Brigade, became the first ever PLW World Tag Team Champions. On December 12, they lost the Tag Team Championships to Darkside (Brian Flynn and Shawn Williams). On May 16, 1993, Evans defeated Scott Z. to win the PLW World Championship. In June, Evans vacated the title.

In 2000, Evans debuted for New England Championship Wrestling. On April 27, 2001, Evans defeated Slyk Wagner Brown to win the NECW Heavyweight Championship. On October 26, he lost the Heavyweight Championship to Maverick Wild. On December 1, Evans defeated Maverick Wild and won back the title only to lose it to Alex Arion on March 22, 2002.

=== World Wrestling Federation/Entertainment (1993, 2000, 2002) ===
In August 1993, Evans debuted in the World Wrestling Federation on an episode of WWF Wrestling Challenge losing to Adam Bomb.

In 2000, on the August 14 episode of Jakked, Evans returned to the World Wrestling Federation as a jobber in a losing effort to Gangrel. On the October 30 episode of Jakked, Evans teamed with Mike Hollow in a losing effort to Dean Malenko and Perry Saturn.

In early 2002, Evans wrestled in a tryout dark match against Aaron Stevens. It was Stevens' first match in WWF/WWE and he has said that Evans settled him down in that match and it helped him get a developmental contract with the company.

=== Ring of Honor (2010–2016) ===
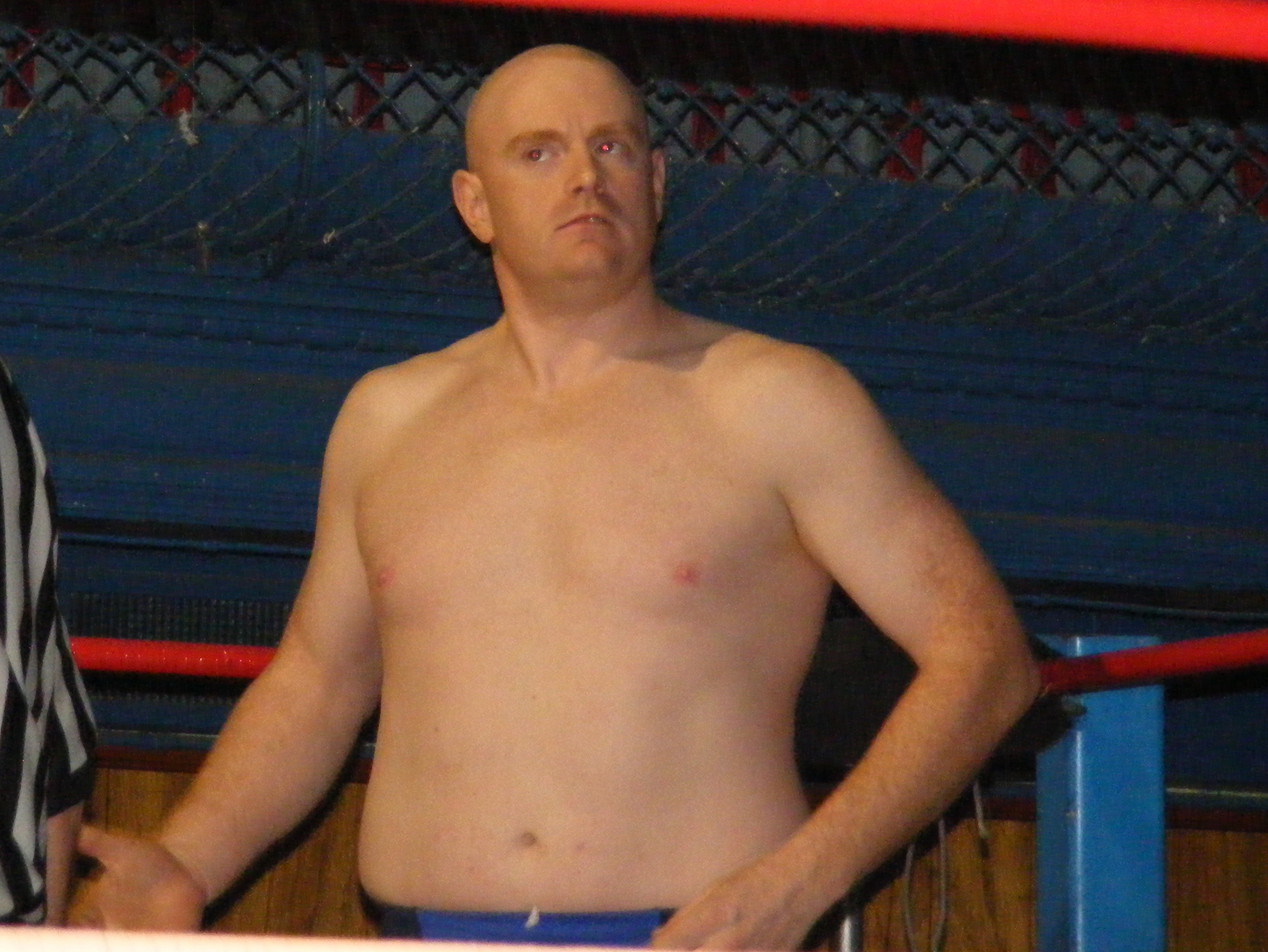
Evans in 2012

On the December 6 episode of Ring of Honor Wrestling, Evans and his client Mike Bennett appeared in the crowd to watch a match between the ROH World Television Champion Eddie Edwards and Christopher Daniels.

On June 21 tapings of Ring of Honor Wrestling, Evans teamed up with Mike Bennett losing to Adam Cole and Eddie Edwards; after Maria Kanellis slapped Cole, they proceeded to attack Edwards and Cole until “The Queen of Wrestling” Sara Del Rey hit the ring to stop it and attempted to put an ankle lock on Kanellis. On July 28 tapings of Ring of Honor Wrestling, it was later announced Bennett would be teaming with Kanellis to face Sara Del Rey and Eddie Edwards in a mixed tag team match at Boiling Point pay-per-view. At the June 23, 2013, tapings of Ring of Honor Wrestling, Bennett turned on Evans. Evans then formed the Brutal Burgers tag team with Cheeseburger. In March 2015 at an ROH Baltimore TV Taping, Evans turned heel on Cheeseburger, ending their 18-month tag team run. Evans and Cheeseburger would later face each other at Global Wars with the bout ending in a no-contest after Evans put Cheeseburger through a table.

=== Iron Week ===
In late 2012, at 40 years old, Bob decided that he would wrestle seven consecutive sixty-minute Iron Man matches, doing so over a seven-day span, referring to this week of events as Iron Week. Viewing it as a way to prove himself, prove he's not just a manager but a viable in ring performer, capable of working a full-time wrestling schedule with ROH (where he worked as a manager). He hand-chose his opponents, and began November 25, 2012. Bob would go on to wrestle Grizzly Redwood, Todd Sople, Julian Starr, Adam Cole, Biff Busick, Antonio Thomas, and Vinny Marseglia over the course of Iron Week. He won twice, lost twice, and accrued three draws.

Evans repeated the week in August–September 2022, ending the week wrestling Colby Corino on the former's 50th birthday.

== Championships and accomplishments ==
- Century Wrestling Alliance
  - NWA New England Television Championship (2 times)
- New England Championship Wrestling
  - NECW Heavyweight Championship (2 times)
- Premier Wrestling Federation
  - Mid-Atlantic Masters Championship (1 time)
- Power League Wrestling
  - PLW World Championship (1 time)
  - PLW World Tag Team Championship (1 time) – with Maniacal Mark
- Pro Wrestling Illustrated
  - PWI ranked him #266 of the 500 best singles wrestlers in the PWI 500 in 2015
- The Sanctuary
  - The Sanctuary Heavyweight Championship (1 time, current)
- Jonquiere Championship Wrestling
  - JCW Tag Team Championship - With Tim Hughes (1 time)
- Upstate Wrestling Entertainment
  - WFR World Heavyweight Champions (1 time) *Current*
- XWE Wrestling
  - xWe Tag-Team Championship (1 time) - with "Tough" Tim Hughes
