= Mickey Keegan =

American retired professional wrestler (born 1986)

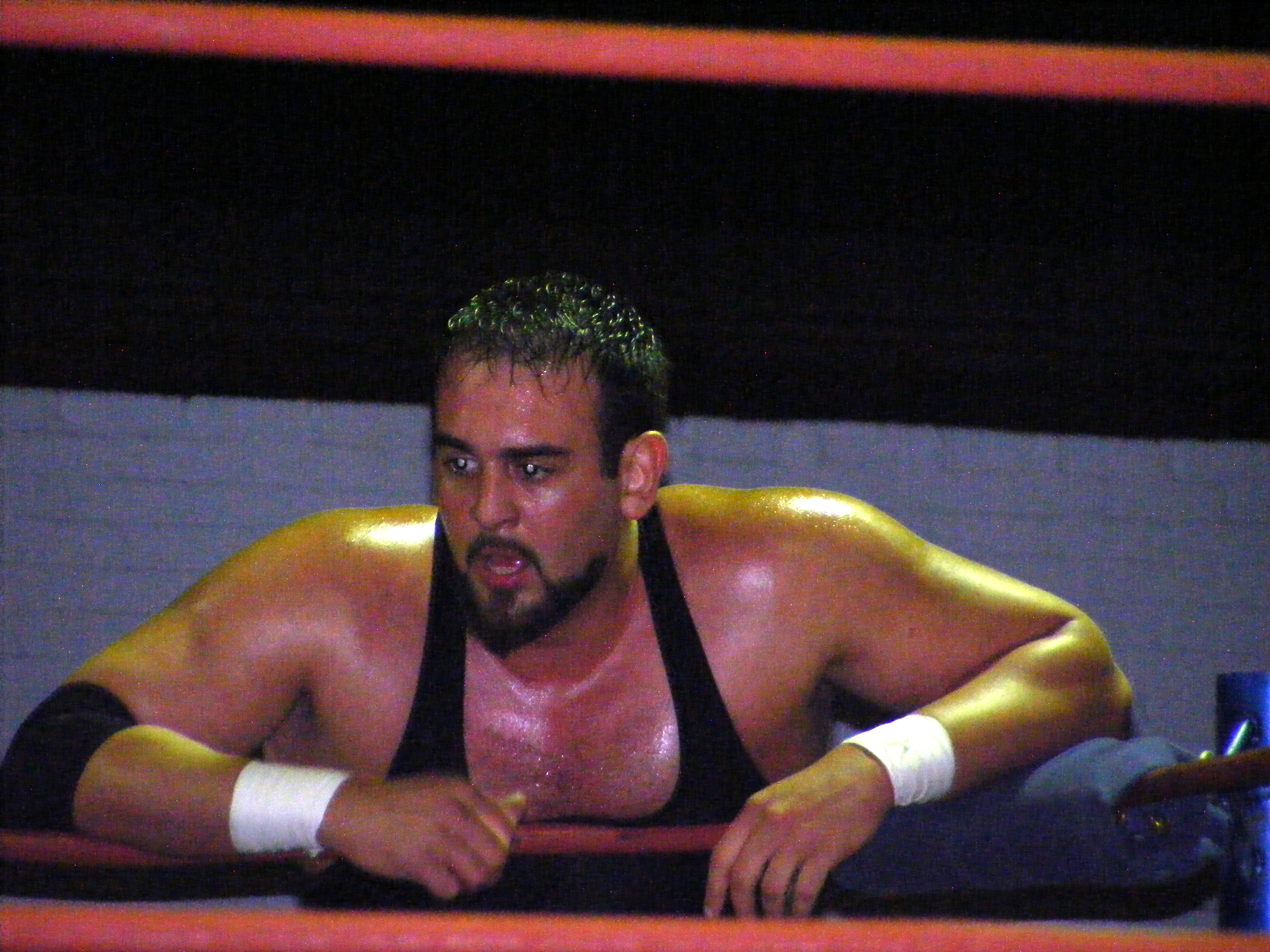
- Mickey Keegan in March 2009

Personal information
- Born: Max Pelham; February 15, 1986 (age 40) Framingham, Massachusetts, U.S.

Professional wrestling career
- Ring name(s): Axl Keegan; Max Bauer; Max Von Bauer; Mickey Keegan
- Billed height: 6 ft 4 in (1.93 m)
- Billed weight: 235 lb (107 kg)
- Billed from: Framingham, Massachusetts; Los Angeles, California
- Trained by: Chaotic Wrestling; Killer Kowalski
- Debut: 2005
- Retired: 2013

Max Pelham (born February 15, 1986) is an American retired professional wrestler best known for his work in the developmental territory, NXT, under the ring name Mickey Keegan. Pelham is also known for his appearances on the independent circuit in the Northeastern United States (with promotions such as Chaotic Wrestling and New England Championship Wrestling) as Max Bauer.

== Professional wrestling career ==
=== Chaotic Wrestling (2005–2012) ===
Bauer first began competing in Chaotic Wrestling (CW) in 2005, and was part of the villainous faction Intellectual Properties with Arch Kincaid and Thomas Penmanship. On December 9, 2005, Bauer won the Chaotic Wrestling Tag Team Championship with Kincaid as part of Intellectual Properties, when they defeated Bryan Logan and Matt Logan. They held the title until April 21, 2006, when they dropped it to The Logan Brothers. On June 30, however, Kincaid and Bauer won back the CW Tag Team Championship from The Logan Brothers, but lost it to Jason Blade and Kid Mikaze on October 20. On December 1, 2006, however, Penmanship turned on the group, and was replaced by Alex Arion.

In 2007, Bauer joined the Big Business faction with Arion and Brian Milones, and were managed by Cherry Payne. On March 30 Bauer and Arion won the CW Tag Team Championship by defeating Jason Blade and Kid Mikaze, but then lost it to Blade and Mikaze on May 18. On October 19, Bauer and Arion defeated Bryan Logan and Brian Fury. At the end of 2007 and start of 2008, Big Business were involved in a rivalry with Brian Fury, with all members taking him on in both singles and tag team matches. Bauer later broke away from Big Business, and began competing in singles matches, before forming a short-lived tag team with Chase Del Monte. On December 5, Bauer competed in a six-way number one contender's match, but it was won by "Big" Rick Fuller. In 2009, Bauer formed a tag team with Tommaso Ciampa.

=== New England Championship Wrestling (2006–2010) ===
Bauer made his New England Championship Wrestling (NECW) debut on June 10, 2006, defeating Nat Turner. In only his second NECW appearance on July 15, Bauer unsuccessfully challenged Frankie Arion for the NECW Television Championship. After a short hiatus from NECW, Bauer returned on October 28 at Monster's Brawl, as part of the DNA faction, alongside TJ Richter and Scott Reed, when DNA defeated Riot, Billy King and Mike Lynch. At the following show, Double Impact, Bauer and Reed, accompanied by Richter, defeated 2D Edge (Jose Perez and Pat Masters).

On February 24, 2007, Bauer lost to Alex Arion, provoking a scripted rivalry between DNA and Alex Arion. At March Badness on March 24, Alex Arion defeated Bauer and Reed in a handicap match. At NECW Global Impact, after Alex Arion defeated "Sensational" Scott Reed on June 30, Bauer and TJ Richter attempted to attack Arion after the match but was stopped by NECW officials who threatened them with suspension. Arion then confronted Reed, Bauer and Richter, and challenged Richter to a singles match to allow his brother Frankie Arion, who had been forced to leave the promotion 10 months earlier, to return to NECW. Richter declined, and instead proposed a gauntlet match in which he would have to defeat all three men or retire from wrestling, to which Arion agreed. On July 20, Arion won the gauntlet match, after defeating Reed first, then Bauer via disqualification, and finally Richter to officially reinstate his brother. At NECW's Birthday Bash 7: Caged Fury on August 18, Bauer and Richter lost to The Arion Brothers. On October 27, Bauer lost a match to the NECW Television Champion Brandon Locke by disqualification after Richter, who had been banned from ringside interfered. Afterwards, Bauer attacked Richter to disband DNA. At The Toxic Waltz on December 28, Bauer won The Toxic Waltz tournament, by defeating Richter in the final, to earn a title match for the NECW Triple Crown Heavyweight Championship at Genesis.

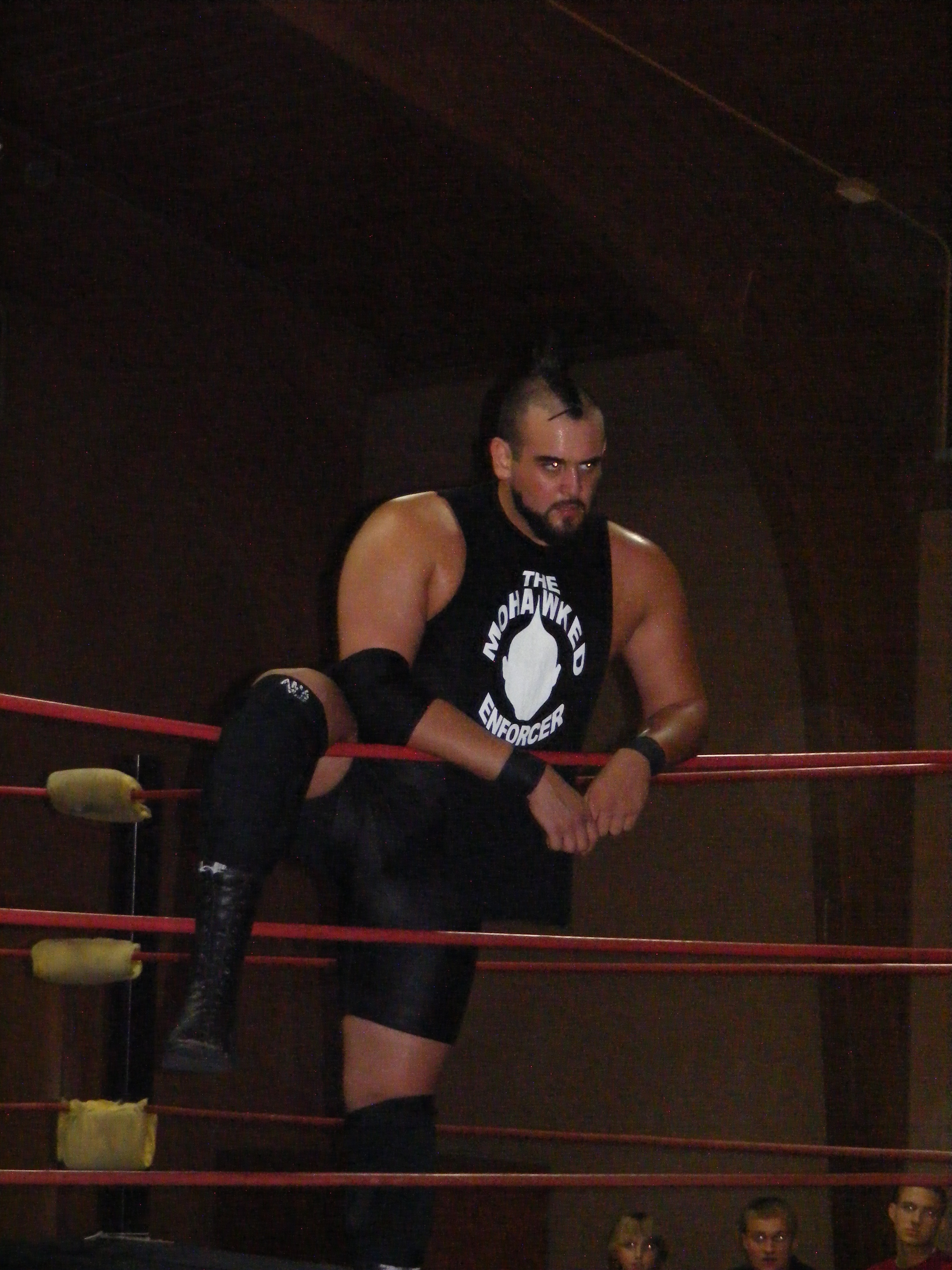
Bauer in 2008

At Snowbrawl on January 28, Bauer and his team of Brian Fury, Alex Arion, and Bobby Fish defeated Rick Fuller, D.C. Dillinger, Eddie Edwards and Antonio Thomas in a tag team elimination match. At Genesis on February 27, Bauer had the title match that he earned by winning The Toxic Waltz tournament, but lost to the reigning champion Rick Fuller by disqualification. In a rematch at March Badness, Fuller defeated Bauer to retain. On April 26, at Spring Breakdown the NECW Triple Crown Heavyweight Championship was vacated due to a controversial ending of the match at March Badness. As a result, a triple threat match, involving Bauer, Rick Fuller and Antonio Thomas, was set up as the main event, and Bauer won to become the undisputed champion. Numerous successful title defenses followed for Bauer, including a triple threat match at Birthday Bash 8: Larger Than Life when he defeated "Big" Rick Fuller and D.C. Dillinger. At the 2008 Toxic Waltz Tournament, Bauer competed under a mask as the "Masked Enforcer", and won the tournament by defeating Alex Arion. Bauer was not cleared to compete in the tournament, so after he unmasked, the NECW President Sheldon Goldberg, reversed the decision and declared Arion the winner, earning Arion a shot at the Triple Crown Championship at Genesis 8.

After Bauer defeated the NECW Television Champion Handsome Johnny on December 13 to retain the Triple Crown Championship, a second match between the two of them January 10, 2009, was won by Bauer again, this time by disqualification. At Genesis 8, on February 21, Bauer defeated Alex Arion to retain his championship. At the following show, Arion interfered in Bauer's match, and hit him with a steel chair. This led to a rematch from Genesis on April 18, in which Bauer retained his championship, after hitting Arion with a steel chair to get himself intentionally disqualified. Bauer lost the title to Brandon Locke in Pembroke, Massachusetts, on February 27, 2010. Bauer had held the title for an NECW record of 22 months.

=== WWE (2012–2014) ===
In August 2012, it was reported that Bauer had signed for WWE and would report to their developmental territory NXT. He made his debut on October 24 on an NXT house show teaming with Corey Graves to defeat Ben Satterley and Trent Barreta. Bauer made his televised NXT debut on December 5 with the ring name Axl Keegan, in a loss to Bo Dallas. On the June 26 NXT, a renamed Mickey Keegan lost to Dallas again. Mickey suffered a career-threatening neck injury, specifically his spinal stenosis was getting narrowed after having an MRI test.

In December 2013, Keegan became an NXT creative assistant. After some months as creative, he quietly left the company.

== Championships and accomplishments ==
- Chaotic Wrestling
  - Chaotic Wrestling Tag Team Championship (3 times) – with Arch Kincaid (2) and Alex Arion (1)
  - Chaotic Wrestling New England Championship (2 times)
- East Coast Wrestling Association
  - ECWA Tag Team Championship (1 time) – with Kermon the German
- New England Championship Wrestling
  - NECW Triple Crown Heavyweight Championship (1 time)
- Pro Wrestling Illustrated
  - PWI ranked him #324 of the 500 best singles wrestlers in the PWI 500 in 2011
