= NECW Tag Team Championship =

Professional wrestling tag team championship

Details
- Promotion: New England Championship Wrestling
- Date established: August 9, 2002
- Date retired: After August 12, 2017
Statistics
- First champion(s): The Egomaniacs (Jonny Idol and Mike Steele)
- Final champion(s): The Kool People (DJ AC and Sammy DeLeon)

The NECW Tag Team Championship is a professional wrestling tag team title in New England Championship Wrestling. The title was later unified with the PWF Mayhem Tag Team title. NECW closed on November 6, 2010, and the championship was retained by PWF Northeast with Da Hoodz recognized as the champions.

== Title history ==
Wrestlers	Reigns together	Date	Place	Notes
The Egomaniacs (Jonny Idol and Mike Steele)	1	August 9, 2002	Somerville, Massachusetts	Defeated Slyck Wagner Brown and April Hunter in a tournament final to become the first champions.
Antonio Thomas and Chad Storm	1	December 20, 2002	Revere, Massachusetts	
The Noize Boyz	1	April 18, 2003	Fitchburg, Massachusetts	
The Egomaniacs	2	June 14, 2003	Hamden, Connecticut	
Vacated		August 22, 2003	Hamden, CT	Vacant after a match between Idol and J-Busta (subbing for Steele) vs. Anthony Michaels and Mark Gore ends in a double pin.
Sabotage (D.C. Dillinger and Eddie Edwards)	1	September 20, 2003	Hamden, Connecticut	Defeated Magic and Suba in tournament final.
Chris Venom and Brian Fury	1	March 13, 2004	Framingham, Massachusetts	
Sabotage	2	May 15, 2004	Framingham, Massachusetts	
Robin Knightwing and Kevin Grace	1	August 21, 2004	Framingham, Massachusetts	Wins a 4-way match.
PRIDE (Dan Freitas and Brian Nunes)	1	August 22, 2004	Somerville, Massachusetts	Wins a 4-way match.
The Logan Brothers (Matt and Bryan Logan)	1	October 15, 2004	Watertown, Massachusetts	
PRIDE	2	December 4, 2004	Plainfield, Connecticut	
Sabotage	3	February 12, 2005	Framingham, Massachusetts	
RAVE (Kristian Frost and Zack Statik)	1	March 19, 2005	Framingham, Massachusetts	
The Logan Brothers	2	April 21, 2005	Somerville, Massachusetts	
RAVE	2	April 23, 2005	Seekonk, Massachusetts	Defeated the Logans, Fred Curry Jr. and Pat Masters, and Afterburn: P.C. Cruise and Ray Diamond.
The A-List (Mark Bourne and Andre Lyons)	1	June 4, 2005	Plainfield, Connecticut	
Matt Logan and Mark Bourne	1	March 18, 2006	Framingham, Massachusetts	Defeated Sabotage (Eddie Edwards and DC Dillinger) when the scheduled title match between the A-List and the Logan Brothers (Matt and Bryan) can not take after Sabotage injure Bryan Logan and Lyonz.
Vacated		June 10, 2006		Vacated after Bourne suffers a back injury and can not defend the title.
The Wild Boys (Billy King and Mike Lynch)	1	July 22, 2006	Quincy, Massachusetts	Defeated Jose Perez and Pat Masters and Scott Reed and T.J. Richter in a 3-way elimination match.
The Canadian Superstars (Dave Cole and J-Busta)	1	August 19, 2006	Quincy, Massachusetts	unify both titles to become NECW Undisputed Tag Team champions.
The Dogs of War (Matt and Kyle Storm)	1	December 16, 2006	Quincy, Massachusetts	
Sabotage	4	June 16, 2007	Danvers, Massachusetts	
Vacated		July 2007		
Chase Del Monte and Fred Curry, Jr.	1	February 16, 2008	Quincy, Massachusetts	Defeated Bryce Andrews and Vain Valentino in tournament final.
PRIDE	3	July 12, 2008	Quincy, Massachusetts	
The Crown Jewels (Darling Damon and Bad Boy Jason)	1	February 21, 2009	Quincy, Massachusetts	
Rican Havoc (Don Vega and Jose Perez)	1	November 28, 2009	Somerset, Massachusetts	
The Crown Jewels	2	November 28, 2009	Somerset, Massachusetts	Defeated Don Vega and Jose Perez in a rematch. Rican Havoc had been forced to return the belts to the Jewels after the match in Somerset, MA due to a contract dispute.
Rican Havoc	2	May 15, 2010	Quincy, Massachusetts	
Da Hoodz ("The Heat" Kris Pyro and "The Hi-Lite" Davey Cash)	1	September 25, 2010	Worcester, Massachusetts	Da Hoodz are recognized(as of November 6, 2010) to be the PWF Northeast Tag Team Champions due to the closing of NECW. NECW reopened in 2011 and Da Hoodz are recognized as tag team champions.
The Dynasty ("Daddy Cat" D.C. Dillinger and "Straight Edge" Brian Fury)	1(5 for Dillinger)	October 23, 2011	Malden, Massachusetts	
VACANT		March 23, 2012	Blackstone, Massachusetts	Dillinger and Fury are stripped of the title by NECW owner/promoter Sheldon Goldberg after their manager Sean Gorman gave them the night off.
All Money I$ Legal/Da Hou$e Party (K-Murda and K-Pusha)	1	March 23, 2012	Blackstone, Massachusetts	Defeated The Logan Brothers(Matt and Bryan Logan) to win the vacant championship. During their reign, K-Murda and K-Pusha changed their team name to "Da Hou$e Party". K-Murda and K-Pusha even changed their own ring names. K-Pusha is now "Cooley-K" and K-Murda is now "Kash The MC".
Vacated		February 1, 2013	Randolph, MA	Vacant after Da Hou$e Party were unable to appear for a scheduled title defense and voluntarily gave up the championship.
Mark Shurman and Scotty Slade	1	February 1, 2013	Randolph, MA	Mark Shurman and Scotty Slade defeated Mike Webb and Nick Fahrenheit after the titles were vacated earlier in the evening.
Mike Webb and Nick Fahrenheit	1	June 8, 2013	Beverly, MA	Defeated Shurman and Slade in a Texas Tornado Rules match. NECW General Manager Paul Richard(ringside enforcer for the match) counted the pin after assigned referee Chris Bartolo was knocked out accidentally by Fahrenheit and Shurman(who were in a tug-of-war with one of the title belts).
Mark Shurman and Scotty Slade	2	October 4, 2013	Beverly, MA	Mark Shurman and Scotty Slade defeated Mike Webb and Nick Fahrenheit in their mandatory rematch.
The End(Mr. Siks and Apocalypse)	1	May 3, 2014	Abington, MA	Awarded title when Shurman and Slade gave up the title and left NECW. Apocalypse suffered an injury during the title reign and The End's manager, Mr. Tony Ulysses, was allowed to let fellow team member Jacob defend the title with Siks.
Nick Fahrenheit and D. C. Dillinger	2(6 for Dillinger)	September 6, 2014	Everett, MA	Dillinger was Fahrenheit's mystery partner for the match and they defeated Siks and Jacob.
The End	2	January 10, 2015	Everett, MA	
Title vacated		April 11, 2015	Everett, MA	The End were stripped of the title after no-showing a scheduled title defense.
The Regulators(Brute Van Slyke and Jack Maverick)	1	March 5, 2016	Wakefield, MA	Defeated The Glamour Express(Buddy Romano and Mike Paiva) in the final of a one-night, four-team tournament that also included Alex North and Genesis and The Heavy Hitters(Shady Shay Cash and Frank Champion).
Title vacated		September 10, 2016	Wakefield, MA	The Regulators were scheduled to defend the title against The Heavy Hitters, but missed their flight. Since the title defense was mandatory, NECW promoter Sheldon Goldberg and NECW General Manager Paul Richard stripped The Regulators of the title.
The Heavy Hitters(Shady Shay Cash and Frank Champion)	1	September 10, 2016	Wakefield, MA	Defeated The Kool People(DJ AC and Sammy DeLeon) to win the vacant title.
Adrenaline Rush(Daniel Evans and Keith Youngblood)	1	August 12, 2017	Wakefield, MA	Defeated The Heavy Hitters(Shady Shay Cash and Frank Champion) in the semi-finals of the NECW Tag Team Classic.
The Kool People(DJ AC and Sammy DeLeon)	1	August 12, 2017	Wakefield, MA	Defeated Adrenaline Rush(Daniel Evans and Keith Youngblood) in the finals of the NECW Tag Team Classic.
Title vacated		Unknown date	Unknown location	Title declared vacant after The Kool People retired from pro wrestling.
