= Ivar (wrestler) =

American professional wrestler (born 1984)

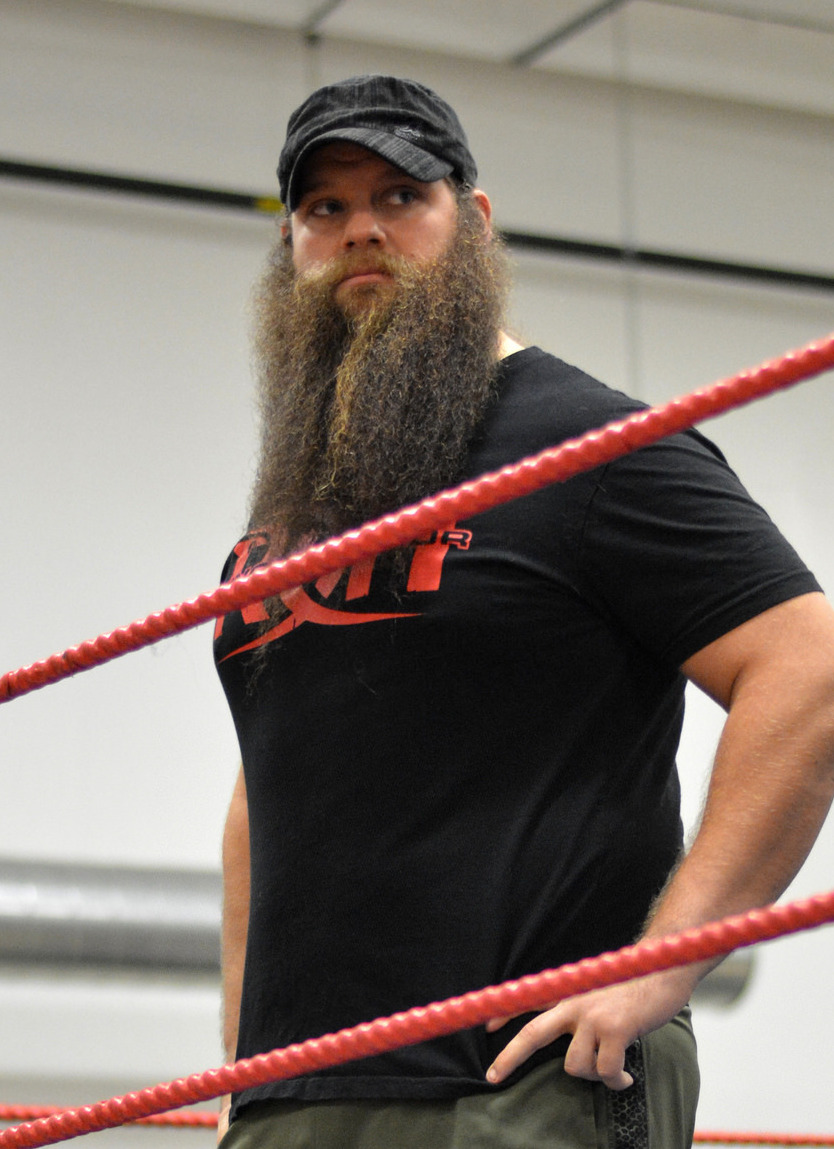
- Ivar in 2015

Personal information
- Born: Todd James Smith; March 3, 1984 (age 42) Lynn, Massachusetts, U.S.

Professional wrestling career
- Ring name(s): Don Chesterfield; Handsome Johnny; Ivar; Johnny Hayes; Todd Hansen; Todd Hanson; Todd Smith; Hanson; War Beard Hanson
- Billed height: 6 ft 2 in (188 cm)
- Billed weight: 350 lb (159 kg)
- Billed from: "Overseas"; Reno, Nevada; Lynn, Massachusetts
- Trained by: Killer Kowalski; WWE Performance Center
- Debut: 2001

Todd James Smith (born March 3, 1984) is an American professional wrestler. He is signed to WWE, where he performs on the SmackDown brand and Lucha Libre AAA Worldwide (AAA) under the ring name Ivar. He is one-half of the tag team the War Raiders with Erik; they are the AAA World Tag Team Champions and are former two-time World Tag Team Champions and a former one-time NXT Tag Team Champions. He is also a trainer at the WWE Performance Center in Orlando, Florida.

Smith is also known for his appearances under the ring name Handsome Johnny, which was used most of his career prior to 2013, and Hanson, which he used from 2013 to 2019. Smith and Raymond Rowe (now known as Erik) have been a regular tag team since 2014, initially under the name War Machine, then later War Raiders, the Viking Experience, Viking Raiders, and finally the War Raiders.

== Professional wrestling career ==
=== Early career (2001–2013) ===
Trained by Killer Kowalski, Smith made his debut in 2001. For the next several years, he worked for a number of independent professional wrestling promotions throughout New England, most notably New England Championship Wrestling and Chaotic Wrestling. Well known for his tag team background, he was part of The Trendsetters with Max Bauer and Pretty Psycho with Psycho. He and Brian Milonas were also the head instructors at the Chaotic Wrestling training facility in North Andover, Massachusetts.

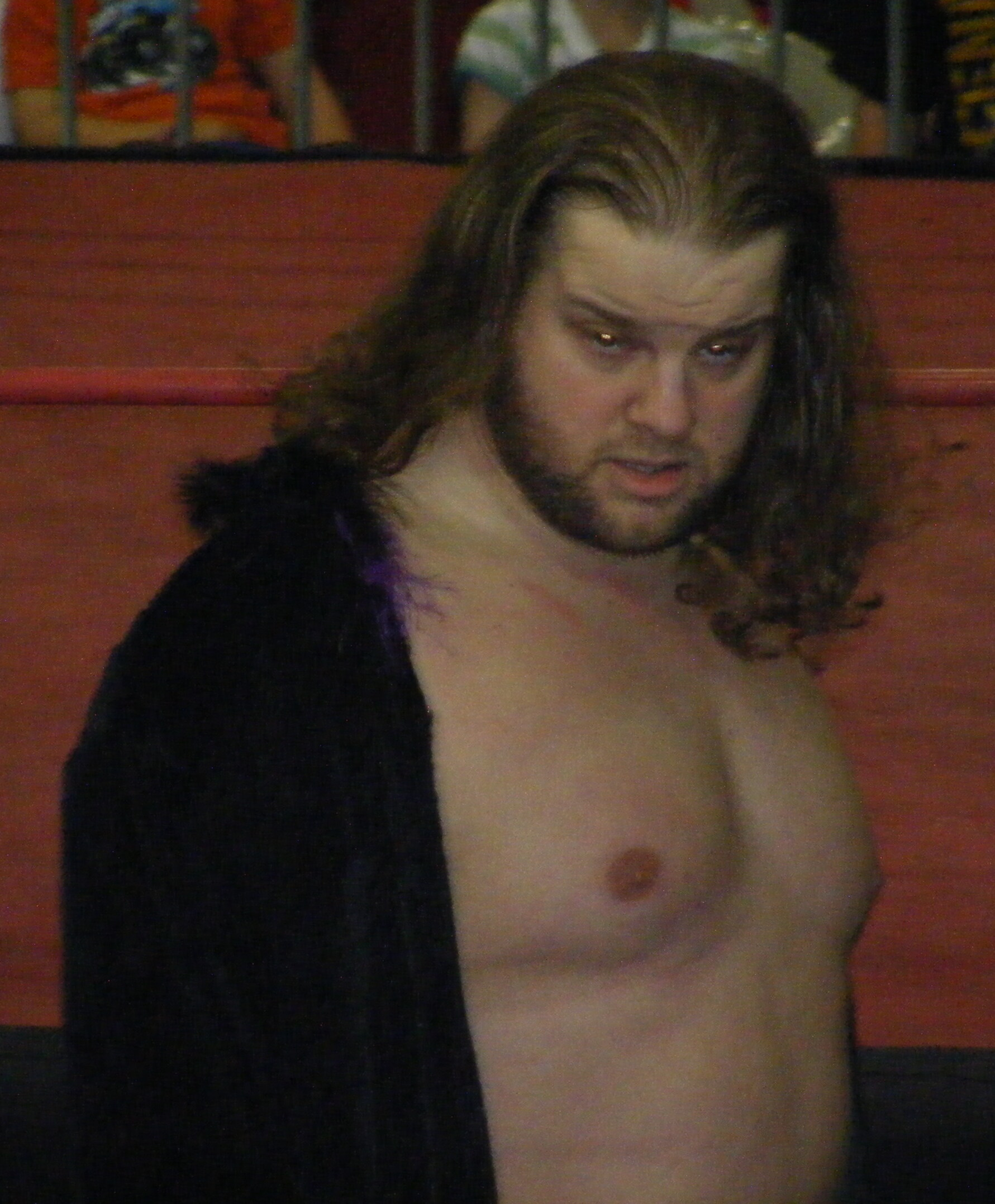
Handsome Johnny in 2008

Smith appeared on Velocity on December 17, 2005, losing to Doug Basham. The following year, on September 15, 2006, he appeared on SmackDown as Todd Hansen in a losing effort to Sylvester Terkay.

On February 16, 2008, Smith defeated Brandon Locke for the NECW Television Championship in Quincy, Massachusetts. The title was vacated on April 22, 2008, due to an injury Smith suffered in a title defense. On June 1, 2008, Smith became the champion again after defeating Chase Del Monte in a tournament final held at Suffolk Downs. In late 2008 a series of vignettes featuring Smith began to air during Chaotic Wrestling live events and on the web, showed Handsome Johnny discovering himself on a trip abroad and lead to the introduction of "The Duke of Elegance" Don Chesterfield into Chaotic storylines. Smith also used this character for the Eastern Wrestling Alliance as well as Front Row Wrestling. In NECW, he changed his ring name in 2010 to "Handsome" Johnny Hayes.

=== Ring of Honor (2013–2017) ===
Smith made his ROH debut on July 27 a losing effort in a four-corner survival also featuring Brian Fury, Kongo, and Vinny Marseglia. A few months after this, he was announced as the eighth participant in the 2014 edition of the Top Prospect Tournament. He defeated Cheeseburger and Andrew Everett in the opening rounds before going on to win the tournament at Wrestling's Finest by defeating Raymond Rowe in the final. As a result, he earned an ROH World Television Championship match against reigning champion Tommaso Ciampa at the 12th Anniversary Show, but was unsuccessful.

He then formed a tag team with Raymond Rowe known as War Machine. On April 11, 2014, Hanson and Rowe both signed contracts with ROH. On August 22, 2015, War Machine defeated Killer Elite Squad (Davey Boy Smith Jr. and Lance Archer) in a non-title match and afterwards challenged them to a match for their GHC Tag Team Championship, a title owned by the Japanese Pro Wrestling Noah promotion. War Machine received their title shot in Japan on September 19, but were defeated by the Killer Elite Squad. On December 18 at Final Battle, War Machine defeated The Kingdom (Matt Taven and Michael Bennett) to win the ROH World Tag Team Championship. They lost the title to The Addiction (Christopher Daniels and Frankie Kazarian) on May 9, 2016, at War of the Worlds. War Machine's final appearance with ROH was on December 16, 2017.

=== Japan (2015–2018) ===
On September 14, 2015, Hanson and Rowe made their Japanese debuts for Pro Wrestling Noah, teaming with Takashi Sugiura in a six-man tag team main event, where they defeated Suzuki-gun (Davey Boy Smith Jr., Lance Archer, and Minoru Suzuki). This led to a match five days later, where War Machine unsuccessfully challenged Smith and Archer for the GHC Tag Team Championship.

In November 2016, War Machine made their debut for New Japan Pro-Wrestling (NJPW) by entering the 2016 World Tag League. They finished the tournament on December 7 with a record of four wins and three losses, failing to advance to the finals.

On April 9, 2017, at Sakura Genesis 2017, War Machine defeated Tencozy (Hiroyoshi Tenzan and Satoshi Kojima) to win the IWGP Tag Team Championship. They lost the title to Guerrillas of Destiny (Tama Tonga and Tanga Loa) on June 11 at Dominion 6.11 in Osaka-jo Hall, regaining it in a no disqualification match on July 1 at G1 Special in USA. They lost the title to Killer Elite Squad in a three-way match, also involving Guerrillas of Destiny, on September 24 at Destruction in Kobe.

=== WWE (2018–present) ===
On January 16, 2018, WWE announced that Hanson had signed a contract with the company and would be reporting to the WWE Performance Center. On March 17, 2018, Hanson and tag team partner, Rowe made their NXT debut at a house show, defeating the team of Adrian Jaoude & Cezar Bononi in their first match. On the edition of April 11, 2018 of NXT, he and Rowe, dubbed War Machine, made their TV debuts, attacking Heavy Machinery (Otis Dozovic and Tucker Knight) and the team of Riddick Moss and Tino Sabbatelli. Two days later on the April 13, 2018 edition of NXT, they went on to defeat the team of Danny Burch and Oney Lorcan.

Throughout the beginning of the year, the team of Hanson & Rowe, now dubbed the War Raiders would continue their winning streak, by defeating several tag teams in the NXT division, including The Mighty and Heavy Machinery. At NXT TakeOver: WarGames, War Raiders would team up with Ricochet and Pete Dunne in the main event to defeat The Undisputed Era in the eponymous WarGames match. At NXT TakeOver: Phoenix, War Raiders defeated the team of Kyle O'Reilly and Roderick Strong to win the NXT Tag Team Championship. On April 15, 2019, they debuted on Raw as The Viking Experience under the new ring names of Erik (Rowe) and Ivar (Hanson). The following week, their name was changed to The Viking Raiders. On September 7, 2020 episode of Raw, The Viking Raiders teamed up with Apollo Crews and Ricochet in an eight-man tag team match against The Hurt Business in a losing effort, where Cedric Alexander scored the pinfall over Ricochet. The match was forced to an abrupt ending due to Ivar suffering a legitimate cervical injury during the match. On September 14, Ivar underwent successful surgery to repair a neck injury. Ivar would return to in ring action on April 12 edition of Raw, teaming up with his tag team partner Erik going up against Shelton Benjamin and Cedric Alexander in a winning effort. As part of the 2021 Draft, both Ivar and Erik were drafted to the SmackDown brand.

As part of the 2023 WWE Draft, both Ivar and Erik were drafted to the Raw brand. On the April 9, 2024, Ivar returned to NXT to challenge NXT North American Champion Oba Femi for the title but failed to defeat Femi at Week 2 of Spring Breakin'. At Night 1 of the 2024 WWE Draft, Ivar was drafted to the Raw brand in the supplementary draft. On the May 14 episode of NXT, Wes Lee, Ivar, and Josh Briggs argued over who should get a title match. Femi decided to let the three fight amongst themselves, and a triple threat match between Lee, Ivar, and Briggs was scheduled for the following week, where the winner would face Femi for his title at NXT Battleground. Later that same night, Gallus (Joe Coffey, Mark Coffey, and Wolfgang) made their return attacking the three competitors. Ivar ended up injured and out of action for an indefinite period of time.

In October 2024, cryptic messages began airing on Raw featuring Nordic characters that translate to "WAR" to promote the team's return. On the October 14 episode of Raw, Ivar and Erik returned defeating Alpha Academy reverting back to their War Raiders name and gimmick. Two weeks later, they defeated the LWO and The New Day in a Triple Threat Tag Team match to become No'1 Contenders to the World Tag Team Championships held by The Judgment Day's Finn Bálor and JD McDonagh but failed to win the titles after interference from Dominik Mysterio and Carlito. On the December 16 episode of Raw, The War Raiders defeated Bálor and McDonagh to become two-time World Tag Team Champions. At Night 1 of WrestleMania 41 on April 19, 2025, they lost the titles to The New Day (Kofi Kingston and Xavier Woods), ending their reign at 124 days. On the May 25, episode of Raw the War Raiders unsuccessfully challenged for the World Tag Team Championship in a Triple Threat Tag Team Match against The New Day and The Creed Brothers. After winning several matches, The War Raiders would once again challenge for the World Tag Team Championship on the December 8, episode of Raw in a losing effort to AJ Styles and Dragon Lee.

On the August 14, 2026, episode of Smackdown Ivar and Erick returned to WWE television to challenge Damien Priest and R Truth and The MFTs in a Triple Threat Tag Team match for the WWE Tag Team Championships which they lost. On the September 11, episode of Smackdown The War Raiders successfully defended their AAA World Tag Team Championships vs. Damien Priest and R Truth.

=== Lucha Libre AAA Worldwide (2026-present) ===
Ivar and Erik made their debuted on Lucha Libre AAA Worldwide (AAA) on February 14, 2026, on AAA on FOX, where they won a triple threat tag team match against Money Machine and Los Americanos to become the number one contenders for the AAA World Tag Team Championship. On May 30, 2026, at Noche de Los Grandes The War Raiders defeated Pagano and Psycho Clown to become AAA World Tag Team Champions for the first time. On September 13, at night two on TripleManía 34 The War Raiders issued an open challenge for the AAA World Tag Team Championships which was accepted by The Wagner Brothers (El Hijo de Dr. Wagner Jr. and Galeno) who defeated them putting an end to their 106 days reign.

== Personal life ==
Todd Smith, along with his teammate Raymond Rowe, is straight edge. In December 2022, Smith married his longtime girlfriend Cherie.

In his spare time Ivar has hosted "Big Guy" classes at the WWE Performance Center.

== Other media ==
Ivar made his video game debut as part of the Titans Pack of downloadable characters available for WWE 2K19 and later appeared in WWE 2K20, WWE 2K22, WWE 2K23, WWE 2K24, WWE 2K25 and WWE 2K26.

== Championships and accomplishments ==
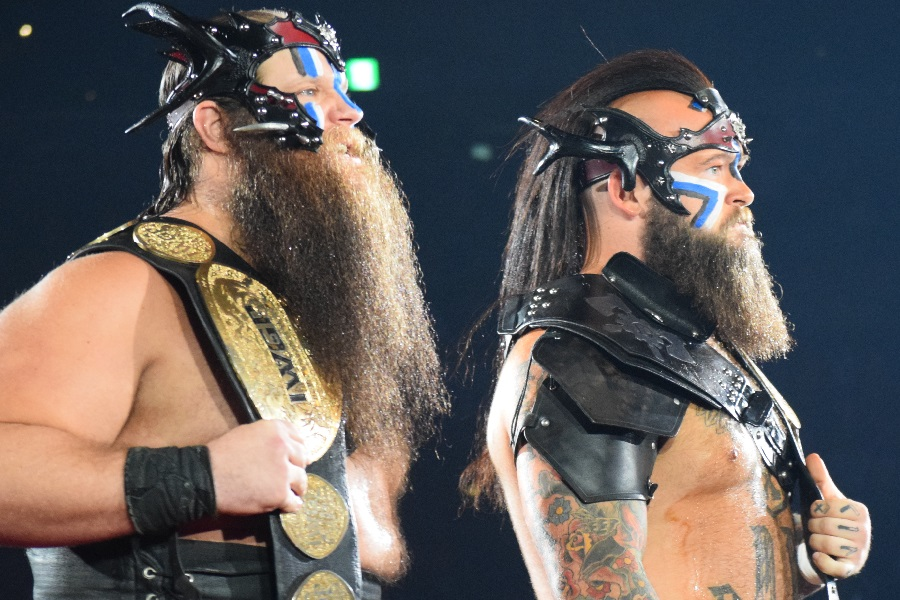
Hanson (left) and Raymond Rowe as the IWGP Tag Team Champions

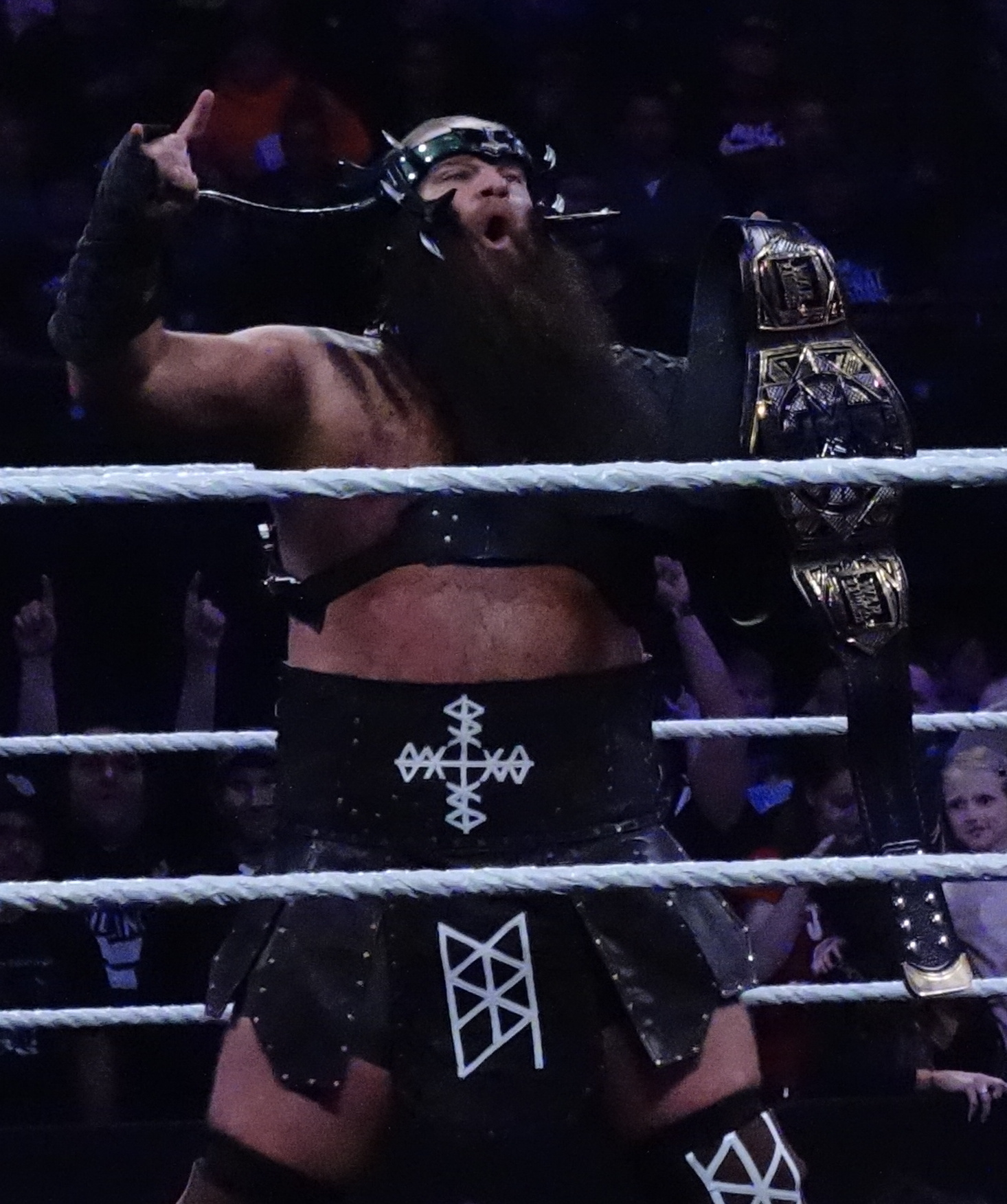
Hanson with the NXT Tag Team Championship

- Brew City Wrestling
  - BCW Tag Team Championship (1 time) – with Raymond Rowe
- Chaotic Wrestling
  - Chaotic Wrestling Heavyweight Championship (3 times)
  - Chaotic Wrestling Tag Team Championship (2 times) – with Psycho
  - Lethal Lottery Battle Royal (2007)
- Lucha Libre AAA Worldwide
  - AAA World Tag Team Championship (1 time) – with Erik
- Millennium Wrestling Federation
  - MWF Heavyweight Championship (1 time)
  - MWF Tag Team Championship (1 time) – with Beau Douglas
- New Japan Pro-Wrestling
  - IWGP Heavyweight Tag Team Championship (2 times) – with Raymond Rowe
- NWA New England
  - NWA New England Television Championship (1 time)
  - NWA New England Tag Team Championship (1 time) – Beau Douglas
- New England Championship Wrestling
  - NECW Unified Television Championship (2 times)
  - IRON 8 Championship (2010)
  - NECW Unified Television Championship Tournament (2008)
- New England Wrestling Alliance
  - NEWA Heavyweight Championship (1 time)
- Northeast Wrestling
  - NEW Heavyweight Championship (1 time)
  - King of Bethany Tournament (2015)
- Pro Wrestling Illustrated
  - Ranked No. 108 of the top 500 singles wrestlers in the PWI 500 in 2016.
- Ring of Honor
  - ROH World Tag Team Championship (1 time) – with Ray Rowe
  - Top Prospect Tournament (2014)
- Ultimate Championship Wrestling
  - UCW Tag Team Championship (1 time) – with Beau Douglas
- VIP Wrestling
  - VIP Tag Team Championship (1 time) – with Raymond Rowe
- What Culture Pro Wrestling
  - WCPW Tag Team Championship (1 time) – with Ray Rowe
- WWE
  - World/WWE Raw Tag Team Championship (2 times) – with Erik
  - NXT Tag Team Championship (1 time) – with Rowe
  - World Tag Team Championship #1 Contender Tournament (2024) – with Erik
  - WWE Speed Championship #1 Contender Tournament (February 28-March 19, 2025)
- Xtreme Wrestling Alliance
  - XWA Heavyweight Championship (1 time)
