= NECW Television Championship =

Professional wrestling championship

Details
- Promotion: New England Championship Wrestling
- Date established: February 12, 2005
- Date retired: After August 12, 2017
Statistics
- First champion(s): Ru Starr
- Final champion(s): The Kool People (DJ AC and Sammy DeLeon)

The NECW Television Championship is a professional wrestling title in New England Championship Wrestling. The title was once unified with the PWF Mayhem Junior Heavyweight title.

== Title history ==
Wrestler:	Times	Date	Location	Notes
Ru Starr	1	February 12, 2005	Framingham, Massachusetts	Defeated Mike Bennett in a 12-man tournament final to become the first champion.
Joe Chece	1	April 15, 2005	Framingham, Massachusetts	
Johnny Idol	1	September 17, 2005	Framingham, Massachusetts	
Frankie Arion	1	March 18, 2006	Framingham, Massachusetts	
T.J. Ritcher	1	August 19, 2006	Quincy, Massachusetts	unifies the title with the PWF Mayhem Junior Heavyweight Championship to become NECW Undisuputed Television champion.
Kristian Frost	1	February 26, 2007	Quincy, Massachusetts	Defeated T.J. Richter, Scott Reed, Kellan Thomas, and Triplelicious in a 5-way match.
Brandon Locke	1	June 6, 2007	Danvers, Massachusetts	
Handsome Johnny	1	February 16, 2008	Quincy, Massachusetts	Defeated Locke by disqualification in a match in which the title could change hands on a disqualification. Locke was caught by the referee with a spray can Johnny brought into the ring.
Title vacated		April 22, 2008		Title vacated due to injury.
Handsome Johnny	2	June 1, 2008	Revere, Massachusetts	Defeated Chase Del Monte in a tournament final. He retained the title on January 10, 2009, due to a double disqualification against Max Bauer
Brandon Locke	2	February 21, 2009	Quincy, Massachusetts	
Ryan Matthews	1	April 18, 2009	Quincy, Massachusetts	
Kris Pyro	1	August 8, 2009	Quincy, Massachusetts	Record holder for longest single television title reign in NECW history (1 year, 1 month and 3 weeks)
Title vacated		October 2, 2010	Quincy, Massachusetts	Pyro gave the title to NECW General Manager Paul Richard in order to concentrate on defending the NECW Tag Team Championship with his tag team partner Davey Cash.
Ryan Bisbal	1	October 2, 2010	Quincy, Massachusetts	Won by pinning Scott Levesque in the 1 fall final of a 12-man battle royal that also included Bobby V, Matt Magnum, Rocco Abruzzi, Ray Keijimura, Mr Mini-roe, Mr Munroe, Brandon Webb, Vinny Marseglia, Triplelicious and Gino Giovanni. NECW briefly shut its doors in late 2010, and when they reopened 6 months later had gotten rid of the TV Championship. On March 22, 2013, upon returning to broadcast television, NECW announced plans to reactivate the title, but did not recognize Bisbal as the champion. Instead, a tournament for the title took place on May 3, 2013.
Johnny Thunder	1	May 3, 2013	Randolph, Massachusetts	Won by pinning Justin Corino in the finals of a four-person tournament. Earlier in the night, Thunder defeated Scott Levesque and Corino defeated Nick Fahrenheit. The Corino/Fahrenheit and Levesque/Thunder matches aired on WMFP-TV in Boston, Massachusetts, on May 16, 2013, and the final aired a week later on WMFP.
Mike McCarthy	1	December 7, 2013	Beverly, Massachusetts	Won via pinning Johnny Thunder in 1 on 1 singles competition
Todo Loco	1	June 13, 2014	Everett, Massachusetts	
Mike McCarthy	2	June 28, 2014	Stockton, Massachusetts	
Todo Loco	2	September 6, 2014	Everett, Massachusetts	
Beau Douglas	1	October 4, 2014	Everett, Massachusetts	Defeated Mike McCarthy and Todo Loco in a 3-way match.
Title vacated		January 10, 2015	Everett, Massachusetts	Beau Douglas vacated title due to a back injury.
Scott Levesque	1	April 11, 2015	Everett, Massachusetts	Defeated Todo Loco to win the title.
Todo Loco	3	September 12, 2015	Everett, Massachusetts	Defeated Scott Levesque in a match in which Levesque's manager, Miss Sammi Lane, was handcuffed to one of the ringposts and her rival, Toxis, was handcuffed to another ringpost.
