= NECW Triple Crown Heavyweight Championship =

Professional wrestling championship

Details
- Promotion: New England Championship Wrestling
- Date established: September 16, 2000
- Date retired: After August 12, 2017

Other name(s)
- NECW Heavyweight Championship
Statistics
- First champion(s): Mike Hollow
- Final champion(s): The Kool People (DJ AC and Sammy DeLeon)
- Most reigns: Slyck Wagner Brown (3)

The NECW Triple Crown Heavyweight Championship was the top professional wrestling championship in New England Championship Wrestling. It was originally known as the NECW Heavyweight Championship until unified with the PWF Northeast and Mayhem championships. NECW closed on November 6, 2010, and its Triple Crown Champion "The Real Deal" Brandon Locke was recognized as the PWF Northeast Heavyweight Champion. Six months later, NECW reopened and recognized Locke as the NECW Heavyweight Champion.

== Title history ==
Wrestler:	Times:	Date:	Days held:	Location:	Notes:
NECW Heavyweight Championship
Mike Hollow	1	September 16, 2000	160	Wethersfield, Connecticut	Defeated Bob Evans in a four-man tournament final to become the first champion.
Slyk Wagner Brown	1	February 23, 2001	63	Somerville, Massachusetts	
Bob Evans	1	April 27, 2001	182	Somerville, Massachusetts	
Maverick Wild	1	October 26, 2001	56	Somerville, Massachusetts	
Bob Evans	2	December 21, 2001	91	Somerville, Massachusetts	
Alex Arion	1	March 22, 2002	273	Somerville, Massachusetts	
Maverick Wild	2	December 20, 2002	492	Revere, Massachusetts	
Michael Sain	1	April 25, 2004	76	Somerville, Massachusetts	
Frankie Arion	1	July 10, 2004	43	Framingham, Massachusetts	
Michael Sain	2	August 22, 2004	114	Somerville, Massachusetts	
Chris Venom	1	December 14, 2004	277	Framingham, Massachusetts	
Paul Lombardi	1	September 17, 2005	8	Framingham, Massachusetts	
Vacated		September 25, 2005			Title vacated after Lombardi attacked officials.
Paul Lombardi	2	October 15, 2005	154	Framingham, Massachusetts	Defeated Bob Evans, Joe Chece, and Chris Venom in a 4-way 45-min Iron Man match as part of the 2nd Annual NECW IRON 8 Championship Tournament.
R. J. Brewer	1	March 18, 2006	84	Framingham, Massachusetts	
D.C. Dillinger	1	June 10, 2006	67	Framingham, Massachusetts	Wins title in a tag team match.
NECW Triple Crown Heavyweight Championship
Evan Siks	1	August 16, 2006	194	Quincy, Massachusetts	Reigning PWF Mayhem Heavyweight champion; unifies both titles with the NECW Heavyweight championship (PWF Mayhem Title is a unified championship of PWF Northeast and Mayhem titles) to become the undisputed champion, title was then renamed the NECW Triple Crown Heavyweight Championship.
D.C. Dillinger	2	February 26, 2007	173	Quincy, Massachusetts	
Brian Fury	1	August 18, 2007	122	Quincy, Massachusetts	This was a steel cage match.
Rick Fuller	1	December 18, 2007	130	Quincy, Massachusetts	
Max Bauer	1	April 26, 2008	672	Quincy, Massachusetts	Defeats Fuller and Antonio Thomas in a 3-way match.
Brandon Locke	1	February 27, 2010	252	Pembroke, Massachusetts	Recognized as the PWF Northeast Heavyweight Champion due to NECW closing on November 6, 2010. The title was reactivated (once again as the NECW Heavyweight Championship) when NECW reopened in May 2011 with Locke recognized as champion.
NECW Heavyweight Championship
Bobby Fish	1	October, 23, 2011	300	Malden, Massachusetts	
Vacated		August 18, 2012			Title vacated after Fish suffered an injury.
Sean Burke	1	September 14, 2012	109	Blackstone, Massachusetts	Won title by defeating Chase Del Monte in the finals of a 4-man, one night tournament.
Vacated		February 1, 2013		Randolph, Massachusetts	Burke was forced to drop the NECW Championship due to an ankle injury sustained during an NECW sanctioned title defense against Antonio Thomas on a benefit event put on by UWF, 12/8/12 in Fall River, MA.
Antonio Thomas	1	February 1, 2013	245	Randolph, Massachusetts	Thomas defeated Johnny Thunder.
Sean Burke	2	October 4, 2013	127	Beverly, Massachusetts	It was a in two out of three falls.
Slyck Wagner Brown	2	February 8, 2014	68	Beverly, Massachusetts	Won title by defeating Burke and Antonio Thomas.
Vacated		April 17, 2014			Slyck Wagner Brown vacated the title due to a knee injury.
Brad Hollister	1	May 10, 2014	364	Beverly, Massachusetts	Won the 4-way, 45 minute Iron 8 tournament final match for the vacant title defeating Damien Wayne, Todo Loco and Antonio Thomas.
Slyck Wagner Brown	3	May 9, 2015	95	Beverly, Massachusetts	
Mike McCarthy	1	September 12, 2015	294	Everett, Massachusetts	Defeated Hollister and Brown in a 3-way match.
Todo Loco	1	July 2, 2016	3,190+	Brockton, Massachusetts	
