= Chaotic Wrestling Tag Team Championship =

Professional wrestling tag team championship

Details
- Promotion: Chaotic Wrestling
- Date established: September 17, 2000
- Current champions: The Breadwinners (Patrick Wheatman and Cash McGuiness)
- Date won: September 11, 2026
Statistics
- First champions: The Damned (Mad Dog and Draven)
- Most reigns: By team The Logan Brothers (Bryan Logan and Matt Logan) (8 reigns); By wrestler Matt Logan (10 reigns)
- Longest reign: The Unit (Ace Romero, Alisha, Danny Miles, J. T. Dunn, Mike Verna and Trigga The OG) (504 days)
- Shortest reign: The Blowout Boys (Danny E. and Vinny E.) (1 day)

The Chaotic Wrestling (CW) Tag Team Championship is a professional wrestling tag team championship in American independent promotion Chaotic Wrestling. It was first won by The Damned (Mad Dog and Draven), who defeated Derik Destiny and Kid Krazy in Worcester, Massachusetts, on September 17, 2000. There have been 63 official reigns shared among 42 different teams consisting of 82 distinctive champions and four vacancies. The current champions are The Breadwinners (Patrick Wheatman and Cash McGuiness), who are in their first reign as a team and individually.

== Title history ==
Key
| No. | Overall reign number |
| Reign | Reign number for the specific champion |
| Days | Number of days held |
| N/A | Unknown information |
| <1 | Reign lasted less than a day |
| + | Current reign is changing daily |

| No. | Team | Date | Event | Location | Reign | Days held | Notes: | Ref. |
|---|---|---|---|---|---|---|---|---|
| 1 | The Damned (Mad Dog and Draven) | September 17, 2000 | Chaotic Wrestling | Worcester, MA | 1 | 33 | Defeated Derik Destiny and Kid Krazy to become first champions. | |
| 2 | One Night Stand (Ronnie D. Lishus and Edward G. Xtasy) | October 20, 2000 | Chaotic Wrestling | Worcester, MA | 1 | 126 | | |
| 3 | Spike Dudley and Kyle Storm | February 23, 2001 | Chaotic Wrestling | Revere, MA | 1 | 50 | | |
| — | Vacated | April 14, 2001 | | — | — | — | The title is vacated when Spike Dudley leaves the promotion for World Wrestling Entertainment and Kyle Storm suffers a serious shoulder injury. | |
| 4 | One Night Stand (Ronnie D. Lishus and Edward G. Xtasy) | April 21, 2001 | Chaotic Wrestling | Andover, MA | 2 | 111 | Defeated Touch of Reality (Jim the Messenger and Bob Steele) for the vacant titles. | |
| 5 | Little Guido Maritato and Luis Ortiz | August 10, 2001 | Chaotic Wrestling | Lynn, MA | 1 | 64 | | |
| 6 | One Night Stand (Edward G. Xtasy and Aaron Stevens) | October 13, 2001 | Chaotic Wrestling | Smithfield, RI | 1 (3, 1) | 62 | | |
| 7 | 12 Pack (Vince Vicallo and R. J. Brewer) | December 14, 2001 | Cold Fury | Lawrence, MA | 1 | 211 | | |
| 8 | Adam Booker and Frankie Armadillo | July 13, 2002 | Chaotic Wrestling | Lawrence, MA | 1 | 182 | | |
| 9 | Attrition (Mike Studd and Christian Angers) | January 11, 2003 | Cold Fury 2: Last Call | North Andover, MA | 1 | 224 | Defeated Armadillo and Arch Kincaid who substituted for the injured Adam Booker. | |
| 10 | Brian Black and Mighty Mini | August 23, 2003 | Chaotic Wrestling | South Portland, ME | 1 | 104 | | |
| 11 | The Lost Souls (Brian Buffet and Peter Mulloy) | December 5, 2003 | Chaotic Wrestling | Methuen, MA | 1 | 98 | | |
| 12 | Brian Black and Mighty Mini | March 12, 2004 | Chaotic Wrestling | Methuen, MA | 2 | 21 | | |
| 13 | The Lost Souls (Brian Buffet and Peter Mulloy) | April 2, 2004 | Chaotic Wrestling | Lowell, MA | 2 | 84 | | |
| 14 | Pretty Psycho (Handsome Johnny and Psycho) | June 25, 2004 | Chaotic Wrestling | Lowell, MA | 1 | 147 | Won the titles in a 7-Team Gauntlet Match against Mulloy and Brian Buffet, Bryan Logan and Ted Logan, Matthew Evagrius and Chase Del Monte, Omega Security, Clinically Inclined (Dr. Heresy and Andre Lyonz) and Shawn Donovan and Roman. | |
| 15 | The Valedictorians (Billy Bax and Rob Eckos) | November 19, 2004 | Chaotic Wrestling | Lowell, MA | 1 | 50 | | |
| 16 | Pretty Psycho (Handsome Johnny and Psycho) | January 8, 2005 | Cold Fury 4: An Eye 4 An Eye | Lowell, MA | 2 | 83 | | |
| 17 | The Logan Brothers (Bryan Logan and Matt Logan) | April 1, 2005 | Chaotic Wrestling | Lowell, MA | 1 | 252 | | |
| 18 | Intellectual Properties (Max Bauer and Arch Kincaid) | December 9, 2005 | Chaotic Wrestling | Methuen, MA | 1 | 133 | | |
| 19 | The Logan Brothers (Bryan Logan and Matt Logan) | April 21, 2006 | Breaking Point | Lowell, MA | 2 | 70 | | |
| 20 | Intellectual Properties (Max Bauer and Arch Kincaid) | June 30, 2006 | Chaotic Wrestling | Methuen, MA | 2 | 112 | | |
| 21 | Jason Blade and Kid Mikaze | October 20, 2006 | | Lowell, MA | 1 | 161 | | |
| 22 | Big Business (Max Bauer and Alex Arion) | March 30, 2007 | Chaotic Wrestling | Lowell, MA | 1 (3, 1) | 49 | This was a Two out of Three Falls match. | |
| 23 | Jason Blade and Kid Mikaze | May 18, 2007 | Chaotic Wrestling | Lowell, MA | 2 | 84 | | |
| 24 | The Blowout Boys (Danny E. and Tommy T.) | August 10, 2007 | Chaotic Wrestling | Lowell, MA | 1 | 322 | | |
| 25 | Rick Fuller and Fred Sampson | June 27, 2008 | Chaotic Wrestling | Lawrence, MA | 1 | 133 | This was a No Disqualification and No Count-Out match. | |
| 26 | The Empire (Brian Milonas and Sledge) | November 7, 2008 | Chaotic Wrestling | Lowell, MA | 1 (3, 1) | 91 | Brian Milonas previously known as Brian Buffet. | |
| 27 | Brian Fury and Mikaze | February 6, 2009 | Cold Fury 8: Infinite Possibilities | Lowell, MA | 1 (1, 3) | 84 | Mikaze previously known as Kid Mikaze. | |
| 28 | The Blowout Boys (Antonio T. and Danny E.) | May 1, 2009 | Road To Breaking Point | Lowell, MA | 1 (1, 2) | 28 | | |
| 29 | The Logan Brothers (Bryan Logan and Matt Logan) | May 29, 2009 | Breaking Point | Lowell, MA | 3 | 315 | | |
| 30 | The Blowout Boys (Danny E. and Vinny E.) | April 9, 2010 | Weekend Of Chaos - Night One | Woburn, MA | 1 (3, 1) | 1 | | |
| 31 | The Logan Brothers (Bryan Logan and Matt Logan) | April 10, 2010 | Weekend Of Chaos - Night Two | Lawrence, MA | 4 | 69 | | |
| 32 | République (Fala and Kongo) | June 18, 2010 | Breaking Point | Lowell, MA | 1 | 147 | | |
| 33 | Matt Logan and Julian Starr | November 12, 2010 | Chaotic Wrestling | Woburn, MA | 1 (5, 1) | 70 | | |
| — | Vacated | January 21, 2011 | | — | — | — | The title is vacated when Bryan Logan returns from a severe arm injury to once again tag with his brother Matt while Chase Del Monte reunites with his partner, Julian Starr, for the first time since Chase's brutal concussion. | |
| 34 | The Logan Brothers (Bryan Logan and Matt Logan) | February 11, 2011 | Cold Fury X | Lowell, MA | 5 (5, 6) | 133 | Won the vacant belts in a Triple Threat tag team match at Cold Fury 10(CFX). The match also featured the teams of Chase Del Monte and Julian Starr as well as Kongo and Fala of République. | |
| — | Vacated | June 24, 2011 | | — | — | — | | |
| 35 | République (Fala and Kongo) | October 21, 2011 | A Chaotic Halloween | Lowell, MA | 2 | 161 | | |
| 36 | The Logan Brothers (Bryan Logan and Matt Logan) | March 30, 2012 | Cold Fury Fallout Tour | Lowell, MA | 6 (6, 7) | 245 | | |
| 37 | Infliction (Gino Martino and John Poe) | November 30, 2012 | Fan Appreciation Tour | Woburn, MA | 1 | 91 | | |
| 38 | The Logan Brothers (Bryan Logan and Matt Logan) | March 1, 2013 | Cold Fury 12: All Or Nothing | Lowell, MA | 7 (7, 8) | 385 | | |
| 39 | Brandon Locke and Scott Reed | March 21, 2014 | Cold Fury XIII | Dracut, MA | 1 | 56 | | |
| 40 | Matt Taven and Vinny Marseglia | May 16, 2014 | The Road To Breaking Point | Woburn, MA | 1 | 42 | This was a three-way match, also involving Friendship (Mark Shurman and Scotty Slade). | |
| 41 | Brian Milonas and Scotty Slade | June 27, 2014 | Breaking Point | Woburn, MA | 1 (4, 1) | 267 | This was a five-way Gauntlet match. | |
| 42 | The Milonas Brothers (Brian Milonas and Jimmy James Milonas) | March 21, 2015 | Cold Fury 14: Divide & Conquer | Dracut, MA | 1 (5, 1) | 118 | Defeated Team Friendship (Mark Shurman and Scotty Slade). | |
| 43 | Team Friendship (Mark Shurman and Scotty Slade) | July 17, 2015 | Summer Chaos | Woburn, MA | 1 (1, 2) | 182 | | |
| 44 | The Logan Brothers (Bryan Logan and Matt Logan) | January 15, 2016 | Chaotic Wrestling | Woburn, MA | 8 (8, 9) | 336 | | |
| 45 | The American Destroyers (Donovan Dijak and Mikey Webb) | December 16, 2016 | Pandemonium | Woburn, MA | 1 | 28 | | |
| 46 | The Mill City Hooligans (Bryan Logan, Chase Del Monte and Matt Logan) | January 13, 2017 | Chaotic Wrestling | Woburn, MA | 1 (9, 1, 10) | 63 | | |
| 47 | The Cam-An Connection (Anthony Greene and Cam Zagami) | March 17, 2017 | Cold Fury 16: Unstoppable | Haverhill, MA | 1 | 301 | | |
| 48 | The Maine State Posse (Aiden Aggro and The DangerKid) | January 12, 2018 | Pandemonium | Woburn, MA | 1 | 63 | | |
| 49 | Killanova Inc (Christian Casanova and Tripilicious) | March 16, 2018 | Cold Fury 17: Resurrection | Haverhill, MA | 1 | 77 | | |
| 50 | The Maine State Posse (Aiden Aggro and The DangerKid) | June 1, 2018 | Chaotic Countdown | Lowell, MA | 2 | 168 | This was a Ladder match. | |
| 51 | Bear Country (Bear Beefcake and Bear Bronson) | November 16, 2018 | Breaking Point | Haverhill, MA | 1 | 224 | | |
| 52 | Killanova Inc (Royce Bishop and Tripilicious) | June 28, 2019 | Elevated | Woburn, MA | 1 (1, 2) | 224 | | |
| 53 | Davienne and J. T. Dunn | February 7, 2020 | Elevated | Hudson, MA | 1 | 356 | | |
| 54 | The Maine State Posse (Aiden Aggro and The DangerKid) | January 28, 2021 | Reloaded | Hudson, MA | 3 | 211 | | |
| 55 | The Unit (Ace Romero, Alisha, Danny Miles, J. T. Dunn, Mike Verna and Trigga The OG) | August 27, 2021 | Summer Chaos | Burlington, MA | 1 (1, 1, 1, 2, 1, 3) | 504 | Trigga The OG previously known as Triplelicious. | |
| 56 | Shot Through The Heart (Love Doug and TJ Crawford) | January 13, 2023 | Pandemonium: Friday The 13th | Lowell, MA | 1 | 287 | Danny Miles and Trigga The OG defended the titles in this match. | |
| 57 | God's Greatest Creations (Armani Kayos and Milo Mirra) | October 27, 2023 | The Devil In Me | Watertown, MA | 1 | 196 | Shot Through The Heart defended the titles in this match. | |
| 58 | Tha Neighborhood (Kidd V and Mani Ariez) | May 10, 2024 | Consequences | Tewksbury, MA | 1 | 126 | God's Greatest Creations defended the titles in this match. | |
| 59 | The Monarchy (Ariel and BMT) | September 13, 2024 | Summer Chaos | Andover, MA | 1 | 196 | This was a four-way match, also involving Dante Drago and Paris Van Dale, and Kalvin DuMont and Spike. | |
| 60 | The Unit (Danny Miles and J. T. Dunn) | March 28, 2025 | Cold Fury XXIII | Lowell, MA | 1 (2, 3) | 231 | This was a four-way match, also involving PVDrago (Dante Drago and Paris Van Dale), and The GGC (Jariel Rivera and Milo Mirra). | |
| 61 | The Powers of Influence (DJ Powers and Jose Zamora) | November 14, 2025 | Breaking Point | Lowell, MA | 1 | 63 | This was an All Out Ladder War, also involving Miracle Generation (Dustin Waller and Kylon King), The Monarchy (King BMT and Prince Jamari), and Team Relentless (Armani Kayos and Shannon LeVangie). | |
| — | Vacated | January 16, 2026 | | — | — | — | | |
| 62 | Vegan Society (Seabass Finn and Sean Keegan) | March 13, 2026 | Cold Fury 24 | Lowell, MA | 1 | 253 | Defeated The Shooter Boys (Aaron Ortiz and Anthony Vecchio) in a tournament final to win the vacant titles. | |
| 63 | The Breadwinners (Patrick Wheatman and Cash McGuiness) | September 11, 2026 | Summer Chaos | Lowell, MA | 1 | 71+ | | |

== Combined reigns ==
As of November 21, 2026

=== By team ===
| † | Indicates the current champion |

| Rank | Team | No. of reigns | Combined days |
|---|---|---|---|
| 1 | The Logan Brothers (Bryan Logan and Matt Logan) | 8 | 1,805 |
| 2 | The Unit (1st reign: Ace Romero, Alisha, Danny Miles, J. T. Dunn, Mike Verna and Trigga The OG) (2nd reign: Danny Miles and J. T. Dunn) | 2 | 735 |
| 3 | The Maine State Posse (Aiden Aggro and The DangerKid) | 3 | 442 |
| 4 | Davienne and J. T. Dunn | 1 | 356 |
| 5 | The Blowout Boys (1st reign: Danny E. and Tommy T.) (2nd reign: Antonio T. and Danny E.) (3rd reign: Danny E. and Vinny E.) | 3 | 351 |
| 6 | République (Fala and Kongo) | 2 | 308 |
| 7 | Killanova Inc (1st reign: Christian Casanova and Tripilicious) (2nd reign: Royce Bishop and Tripilicious) | 2 | 301 |
| 7 | The Cam-An Connection (Anthony Greene and Cam Zagami) | 1 | 301 |
| 9 | One Night Stand (Reigns 1–2: Ronnie D. Lishus and Edward G. Xtasy) (3rd reign: Edward G. Xtasy and Aaron Stevens) | 3 | 299 |
| 10 | Shot Through The Heart (Love Doug and TJ Crawford) | 1 | 287 |
| 11 | Brian Milonas and Scotty Slade | 1 | 267 |
| 12 | Intellectual Properties (Max Bauer and Arch Kincaid) | 2 | 245 |
| 12 | Jason Blade and Kid Mikaze | 2 | 245 |
| 14 | Pretty Psycho (Handsome Johnny and Psycho) | 2 | 230 |
| 15 | Attrition (Mike Studd and Christian Angers) | 1 | 224 |
| 15 | Bear Country (Bear Beefcake and Bear Bronson) | 1 | 224 |
| 17 | 12 Pack (Vince Vicallo and R. J. Brewer) | 1 | 211 |
| 18 | God's Greatest Creations (Armani Kayos and Milo Mirra) | 1 | 196 |
| 18 | The Monarchy (Ariel and BMT) | 1 | 196 |
| 20 | Vegan Society (Seabass Finn and Sean Keegan) | 1 | 184 |
| 21 | The Lost Souls (Brian Buffet and Peter Mulloy) | 2 | 182 |
| 21 | Adam Booker and Frankie Armadillo | 1 | 182 |
| 21 | Team Friendship (Mark Shurman and Scotty Slade) | 1 | 182 |
| 24 | Rick Fuller and Fred Sampson | 1 | 133 |
| 25 | The Neighborhood (Kidd V and Mani Ariez) | 1 | 126 |
| 26 | Brian Black and Mighty Mini | 2 | 125 |
| 27 | The Milonas Brothers (Brian Milonas and Jimmy James Milonas) | 1 | 118 |
| 28 | Infliction (Gino Martino and John Poe) | 1 | 91 |
| 28 | The Empire (Brian Milonas and Sledge) | 1 | 91 |
| 30 | Brian Fury and Mikaze | 1 | 84 |
| 31 | The Breadwinners † (Patrick Wheatman and Cash McGuiness) | 1 | 71+ |
| 32 | Matt Logan and Julian Starr | 1 | 70 |
| 33 | Little Guido Maritato and Luis Ortiz | 1 | 64 |
| 34 | The Mill City Hooligans (Bryan Logan, Chase Del Monte and Matt Logan) | 1 | 63 |
| 34 | The Powers of Influence (DJ Powers and Jose Zamora) | 1 | 63 |
| 36 | Brandon Locke and Scott Reed | 1 | 56 |
| 37 | Spike Dudley and Kyle Storm | 1 | 50 |
| 37 | The Valedictorians (Billy Bax and Rob Eckos) | 1 | 50 |
| 39 | Big Business (Max Bauer and Alex Arion) | 1 | 49 |
| 40 | Matt Taven and Vinny Marseglia | 1 | 42 |
| 41 | The Damned (Mad Dog and Draven) | 1 | 33 |
| 42 | The American Destroyers (Donovan Dijak and Mikey Webb) | 1 | 28 |

=== By wrestler ===
| Rank | Wrestler | No. of reigns | Combined days |
|---|---|---|---|
| 1 | Matt Logan | 10 | 1,938 |
| 2 | Bryan Logan | 9 | 1,868 |
| 3 | J. T. Dunn | 3 | 1,091 |
| 4 | Trigga The OG/Tripilicious | 3 | 805 |
| 5 | Danny Miles | 2 | 735 |
| 6 | Brian Buffet/Brian Milonas | 5 | 658 |
| 7 | Ace Romero | 1 | 504 |
| 7 | Alisha | 1 | 504 |
| 7 | Mike Verna | 1 | 504 |
| 10 | Scotty Slade | 2 | 449 |
| 11 | Aiden Aggro | 3 | 442 |
| 11 | The DangerKid | 3 | 442 |
| 13 | Danny E. | 3 | 351 |
| 14 | Davienne | 1 | 356 |
| 15 | Kid Mikaze | 3 | 329 |
| 16 | Tommy T. | 1 | 322 |
| 17 | Fala | 2 | 308 |
| 17 | Kongo | 2 | 308 |
| 19 | Anthony Greene | 1 | 301 |
| 19 | Cam Zagami | 1 | 301 |
| 21 | Edward G. Xtasy | 3 | 299 |
| 22 | Max Bauer | 3 | 294 |
| 23 | Love Doug | 1 | 287 |
| 23 | TJ Crawford | 1 | 287 |
| 25 | Arch Kincaid | 2 | 245 |
| 25 | Jason Blade | 2 | 245 |
| 27 | Ronnie D. Lishus | 2 | 237 |
| 28 | Handsome Johnny | 2 | 230 |
| 28 | Psycho | 2 | 230 |
| 30 | Bear Beefcake | 1 | 224 |
| 30 | Bear Bronson | 1 | 224 |
| 30 | Christian Angers | 1 | 224 |
| 30 | Mike Studd | 1 | 224 |
| 30 | Royce Bishop | 1 | 224 |
| 35 | R. J. Brewer | 1 | 211 |
| 35 | Vince Vicallo | 1 | 211 |
| 37 | Armani Kayos | 1 | 196 |
| 37 | Milo Mirra | 1 | 196 |
| 37 | Ariel | 1 | 196 |
| 37 | BMT | 1 | 196 |
| 41 | Seabass Finn | 1 | 184 |
| 41 | Sean Keegan | 1 | 184 |
| 43 | Peter Mulloy | 2 | 182 |
| 43 | Adam Booker | 1 | 182 |
| 43 | Frankie Armadillo | 1 | 182 |
| 43 | Mark Shurman | 1 | 182 |
| 47 | Fred Sampson | 1 | 133 |
| 47 | Rick Fuller | 1 | 133 |
| 49 | Kidd V | 1 | 126 |
| 49 | Mani Ariez | 1 | 126 |
| 51 | Brian Black | 2 | 125 |
| 51 | Mighty Mini | 2 | 125 |
| 53 | Jimmy James Milonas | 1 | 118 |
| 54 | Gino Martino | 1 | 91 |
| 54 | John Poe | 1 | 91 |
| 54 | Sledge | 1 | 91 |
| 57 | Brian Fury | 1 | 84 |
| 58 | Christian Casanova | 1 | 77 |
| 59 | Patrick Wheatman † | 1 | 71+ |
| 59 | Cash McGuiness † | 1 | 71+ |
| 61 | Julian Starr | 1 | 70 |
| 62 | Little Guido Maritato | 1 | 64 |
| 62 | Luis Ortiz | 1 | 64 |
| 64 | Chase Del Monte | 1 | 63 |
| 64 | DJ Powers | 1 | 63 |
| 64 | Jose Zamora | 1 | 63 |
| 67 | Aaron Stevens | 1 | 62 |
| 68 | Brandon Locke | 1 | 56 |
| 68 | Scott Reed | 1 | 56 |
| 70 | Billy Bax | 1 | 50 |
| 70 | Kyle Storm | 1 | 50 |
| 70 | Rob Eckos | 1 | 50 |
| 70 | Spike Dudley | 1 | 50 |
| 74 | Alex Arion | 1 | 49 |
| 75 | Matt Taven | 1 | 42 |
| 75 | Vinny Marseglia | 1 | 42 |
| 77 | Draven | 1 | 33 |
| 77 | Mad Dog | 1 | 33 |
| 79 | Antonio T. | 1 | 28 |
| 79 | Donovan Dijak | 1 | 28 |
| 79 | Mikey Webb | 1 | 28 |
| 82 | Vinny E. | 1 | 1 |

== See also ==
- Chaotic Wrestling Heavyweight Championship
- Chaotic Wrestling New England Championship
- Chaotic Wrestling Pan Optic Championship
