= CWA Television Championship =

Professional wrestling championship

Details
- Promotion: Century Wrestling Alliance
- Date established: July 1994
- Date retired: March 10, 2007

Other name(s)
- NWA New England Television Championship
Statistics
- First champion(s): Metal Maniac
- Final champion(s): Adam Booker
- Most reigns: Beau Douglas (3 reigns)

The Century Wrestling Alliance Television Championship is a secondary wrestling title in the Century Wrestling Alliance. It was first known by that name when the title was first established in 1994, and was renamed as the NWA New England Television Championship when the CWA joined the National Wrestling Alliance and became NWA New England in January 1998. The title returned to its original name when the CWA withdrew from the NWA on March 10, 2007.

== Title history ==
Silver areas in the history indicate periods of unknown lineage.

| Wrestler: | Times: | Date: | Location: | Notes: |
|---|---|---|---|---|
CWA Television Championship
| Metal Maniac | 1 | July 1994 | | The first champion |
| Doink the Clown | 1 | July 16, 1994 | Springfield, Massachusetts | |
| Vacant | | December 1995 | | Title vacant |
| Vic Steamboat | 1 | December 12, 1995 | Hartford, Connecticut | Defeats Knuckles Nelson in tournament final |
| Knuckles Nelson | 1 | July 6, 1996 | Derry, New Hampshire | |
| Vic Steamboat | 2 | December 8, 1997 | Brattleboro, Vermont | |
Renamed NWA New England Television Championship
| Knuckles Nelson | 2 | July 4, 1998 | Singapore | Fictitious title change |
| Vic Steamboat | 3 | August 28, 1998 | | Title awarded. Nelson stripped of the title, reign will not be recognized in the company annuals. |
| Vacant | | September 21, 1998 | | Title vacant |
| The Mercenary | 1 | October 17, 1998 | ? | Defeats Curtis Slamdawg and Millennium in Triple Threat match for vacant title |
| Bob Evans | 1 | February 18, 1999 | Mansfield, Massachusetts | |
| Tre | 1 | May 29, 1999 | Somerville, Massachusetts | |
| Bob Evans | 2 | May 29, 1999 | Somerville, Massachusetts | |
| Beau Douglas | 1 | June 27, 1999 | Somerville, Massachusetts | |
| Slick Wagner Brown | 1 | August 22, 1999 | Somerville, Massachusetts | |
| Vacant | | April 2000 | | Title vacant |
| Beau Douglas | 2 | June 22, 2000 | Somerville, Massachusetts | Defeats Joel Davis and Kyle Storm in a triangle match for the vacant title |
| Bull Montana | 1 | February 18, 2001 | Raynham, Massachusetts | |
| Trooper Gilmore | 1 | | | Given the title by Bull Montana |
| Beau Douglas | 3 | 2001 | ? | |
| Lando Williams | 1 | August 8, 2001 | Melrose, Massachusetts | |
| "The New Sensation" Steve Morabito | 1 | August 24, 2001 | Melrose, Massachusetts | |
| Freight Train Dan | 1 | January 2002 | Melrose, Massachusetts | Defeats Apocalypse |
| Vacant | | | | Freight Train Dan leaves the promotion |
| Outpatient | 1 | July 13, 2002 | Woonsocket, Rhode Island | Defeats Black Dragon |
| Todd Hanson | 1 | October 5, 2002 | Wakefield, Massachusetts | |
| Vacant | | | | Title vacant |
| Adam Booker | 1 | July 22, 2005 | Everett, Massachusetts | Defeats Beau Douglas in a tournament final; CWA withdraws from the NWA on March 10, 2007 |
Renamed CWA Television Championship
