= MWF Heavyweight Championship =

The MWF Heavyweight Championship was a professional wrestling title in American independent promotion Millennium Wrestling Federation. The title was created when Tiger Mulligan defeated John Brooks in a 17-man "Soul Survivor" competition in Lynn, Massachusetts on May 31, 2003. The title was primarily defended in the greater Boston area as well as in southern New England. There have been a total of 7 recognized individual champions, who have had a combined 9 official reigns.

== Title history ==
Wrestlers:	Reign(s):	Location:	Date:	Days held:	Notes:
Tiger Mulligan	1	Lynn, MA	May 31, 2003	134	This was a 17-Man Soul Survivor Competition, def. John Brooks to become the first-ever MWF Heavyweight Champion; during the match, Tiger Mulligan suffered a knee injury, and as a result of being unable to defend the championship in a suitable time period, is forced to surrender the MWF Heavyweight Championship by MWF Commissioner Dr. Brad Von Johnson.
Dylan Kage	1	Melrose, MA	October 12, 2003	1,392	Def. Slyck Wagner Brown to win the vacant MWF Heavyweight Championship.
Todd Hanson	1	Somerville, MA	August 4, 2007	694	
Slyck Wagner Brown	1	Melrose, MA	June 28, 2009	140	This was a Six Pack All Star Challenge, also involving Scott Reed, Max Bauer, "Die Hard" Eddie Edwards, "Straight Edge" Brian Fury and Rick Fuller; Slyck Wagner Brown pinned Scott Reed to win the vacant MWF Heavyweight Championship.
Jay Lethal	1	Melrose, MA	November 15, 2009	0	Awarded the MWF Heavyweight Championship by MWF President John Cena, Sr. due to Slyck Wagner Brown failing to appear on time for his championship match.
Slyck Wagner Brown	2	Melrose, MA	November 15, 2009	550	This was a Steel Cage Match.
Shelton Benjamin	1	Melrose, MA	March 19, 2011	77	
Slyck Wagner Brown	3	Bridgeport, CT	June 4, 2011	107	
Low Ki	1	Melrose, MA	September 17, 2011	520	
Deactivated	-	—	February 18, 2013	—	Ki was stripped for lack of title defenses with his New Japan schedule; replaced with MWF Undisputed Championship.

== List of combined reigns ==
†	Indicates the current champions
(-)	Indicates that the reign lasted less than one day.

Rank	Wrestler	No. of reigns	Combined days
1	Dylan Kage	1	1392
2	Slyck Wagner	3	797
3	Todd Hanson	1	694
4	Low Ki	1	520
5	Tiger Mulligan	1	134
6	Shelton Benjamin	1	77
7	Jay Lethal	1	0
