= Rick Fuller =

American professional wrestler (born 1969)

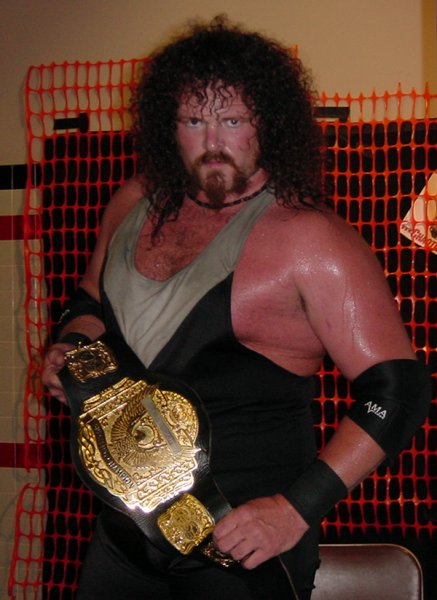
- Fuller as the Chaotic Wrestling Heavyweight Champion in 2001.

Personal information
- Born: Richard Fuller; April 1, 1969 (age 57) Middleborough, Massachusetts, U.S.
- Children: 2

Professional wrestling career
- Ring name(s): Rick Fuller
- Billed height: 6 ft 5 in (196 cm)
- Billed weight: 325 lb (147 kg)
- Billed from: Middleborough, Massachusetts, United States
- Trained by: Jimmy Snuka; Tony Atlas
- Debut: 1990
- Retired: 2014

Richard Fuller (born April 1, 1969) is an American retired professional wrestler. He is best known for his appearances with World Championship Wrestling from 1997 to 2000.

== Early life ==
Born in Middleborough, Massachusetts, Fuller graduated from Middleborough High School in 1987.

== Professional wrestling career ==
=== Early career (1990–1997) ===
Born in Middleboro, Massachusetts, Fuller graduated from Middleborough High School in 1987 and soon began training under "Superfly" Jimmy Snuka and "Mr. USA" Tony Atlas at their wrestling school in New Bedford, Massachusetts.

Touring the Northeast during the 1990s, Fuller won championship titles in several promotions and, most notably, feuded with Scott Garland while in the New England Wrestling Association later fighting over the NEWA Heavyweight Championship during 1992 and 1993.

=== World Championship Wrestling (1997–2000) ===
In early 1997, Fuller made his debut in World Championship Wrestling losing to Lex Luger at the Superdome in New Orleans, Louisiana, on January 13, 1997. Regularly appearing on WCW Monday Nitro, WCW Saturday Night during the year, he also lost to Chris Benoit on February 22 and Diamond Dallas Page on March 3. Later that month, he would also face Roadblock and Johnny Swinger on Saturday Night before teaming with Roadblock against Lex Luger and The Giant on Monday Nitro on March 31, 1997.

Suffering losses to Booker T and Jeff Jarrett during the next two months, he lost to Meng in a dark match on Monday Nitro on May 12. After another loss to Jeff Jarrett on Saturday Night on May 24, he also lost to The Giant in a handicap match with Johnny Swinger and Jerry Flynn on Monday Nitro on May 26. In early June, he would also lose to Ice Train and Buff Bagwell and later to "Hacksaw" Jim Duggan on Monday Nitro in Las Vegas, Nevada, on July 13.

One of the first victims of Bill Goldberg's winning streak during early 1998, Fuller was pinned by Goldberg on WCW Thunder on February 2. He later appeared on WCW WorldWide losing to Konnan on February 21. as well as appearing on Saturday Night facing Hugh Morris, Jim Duggan and Prince Iaukea as well as to Booker T and Steve McMichael on Thunder before defeating Doc Dean on July 25, 1998.

During the next few months however, while scoring victories over preliminary wrestlers, he would lose matches to Scott Norton, Bryan Clark, Marty Jannetty and Jerry Flynn before losing to WCW World Heavyweight Champion Bill Goldberg on Thunder in Lexington, Kentucky, on September 10. He would also lose to Ernest "The Cat" Miller and Rick Steiner before defeating El Dandy on Worldwide on October 17, 1998.

Fuller defeated Lash LeRoux on WorldWide on January 26. Fuller later teamed with Knuckles Nelson at the NWA Parade of Champions, substituting for the injured Erich Sbraccia, winning the then vacant NWA World Tag Team Championship against Team Extreme (Kit Carson and Khris Germany) winning by reverse decision at the Bronco Bowl in Dallas, Texas, on June 10, 1999. However, the two would hold them for less than a week before losing the titles to The Public Enemy in Bolton, Massachusetts, on June 17.

Fuller would make only occasional appearances with WCW for most of the year, defeating Sick Boy on Thunder in Birmingham, Alabama, on July 14, he would instead wrestle for independent promotions including an appearance at Ultimate Professional Wrestling's Slam & Jam '99 defeating former trainer "Mr. USA" Tony Atlas at the Augusta Civic Center in Augusta, Maine, on December 30, 1999.

Returning to WCW in early 2000, Fuller faced Tank Abbott on Monday Nitro on February 14 and later appeared on Saturday Night during its last months on the air facing The Wall, The Demon and in the last episode, participated in a six-man Hardcore Battle Royal won by Brian Knobs and included Norman Smiley, Adrian Byrd, Dave Burkehead and The Dog on April 1, 2000.

Fuller was featured in the video games WCW Nitro and WCW/nWo Thunder.

=== World Wrestling Federation (2000–2001) ===
Fuller made an appearance in the World Wrestling Federation (WWF) facing Scotty 2 Hotty on October 30, 2000 at the Fleet Center in Boston. On May 21, 2001, he faced against Devon Storm at the Hartford Civic Center in Hartford, Connecticut.

=== Later Career (2000–2014) ===
After the close of WCW, Fuller returned to the independent circuit and, while in East Coast Championship Wrestling joined the stable Alliance of Defiance with Kevin Kelly and Billy Fives in early 2001.

In December 2001, Fuller assaulted then-referee Barry Ace during a match for NWA New England after he had unintentionally caused Fuller to mistime a wrestling move. NWA New England Vice President Vinnie Capelli later made a public statement accepting full responsibility for the incident as Barry Ace was not a fully trained referee at the time. Despite this incident, Fuller remained with the promotion and, the following year, he won the NWA New England Heavyweight Championship. Several years later, Fuller and Ace both portrayed prison inmates in the film What Doesn't Kill You.

During 2006, Fuller would continue his feud with Brian Milonas in East Coast Championship Wrestling defeating him on May 6 although he was later eliminated by Milonas in the ECCW "Road to the Championship" Tournament on May 20. The following month he debuted New England Championship Wrestling defeating Nat Turner on July 15 although he would later lose to NECW U.S. Champion Eric Shred by disqualification on October 7 and, with Evan Siks, defeated Eddie Edwards and DC Dillinger by disqualification on October 28, 2006. Defeating Triplelicious and Chris Green during the next several weeks, he joined Team Nightmare (Evan Siks, Jason Blade and Brian Fury) defeating Team Sabotage (Kristian Frost, John Walters, Eddie Edwards and DC Dillinger) in an 8-man elimination match on December 16, 2006.

In early 2007, he lost to Abyss in a stretcher match during a Powerhouse Wrestling of New England event on January 27 and, the following month in Big Time Wrestling, defeated Eddie Edwards on February 25 before losing to Mister TA in a dog collar match on March 2, 2007. From late 2007 through early 2008, he wrestled for a small company in Fair Haven, Massachusetts called Alliance Championship Wrestling.

On May 18, 2007, Fuller faced Chaotic Wrestling Heavyweight Champion Brian Milonas in the main event of the Homecoming benefit show in Byfield, Massachusetts, a fundraising event held by Chaotic Wrestling and Fabulous Productions to raise money for charities in the New England area including the Mothers Against Drunk Driving, the Newbury Police Association and the Trista Zinck Scholarship Fund. The match, which featured WWE World Heavyweight Champion John Cena as special referee, also saw Vince McMahon in a rare appearance on the independent circuit who attempted to interfere in the match only to be stopped by Cena.

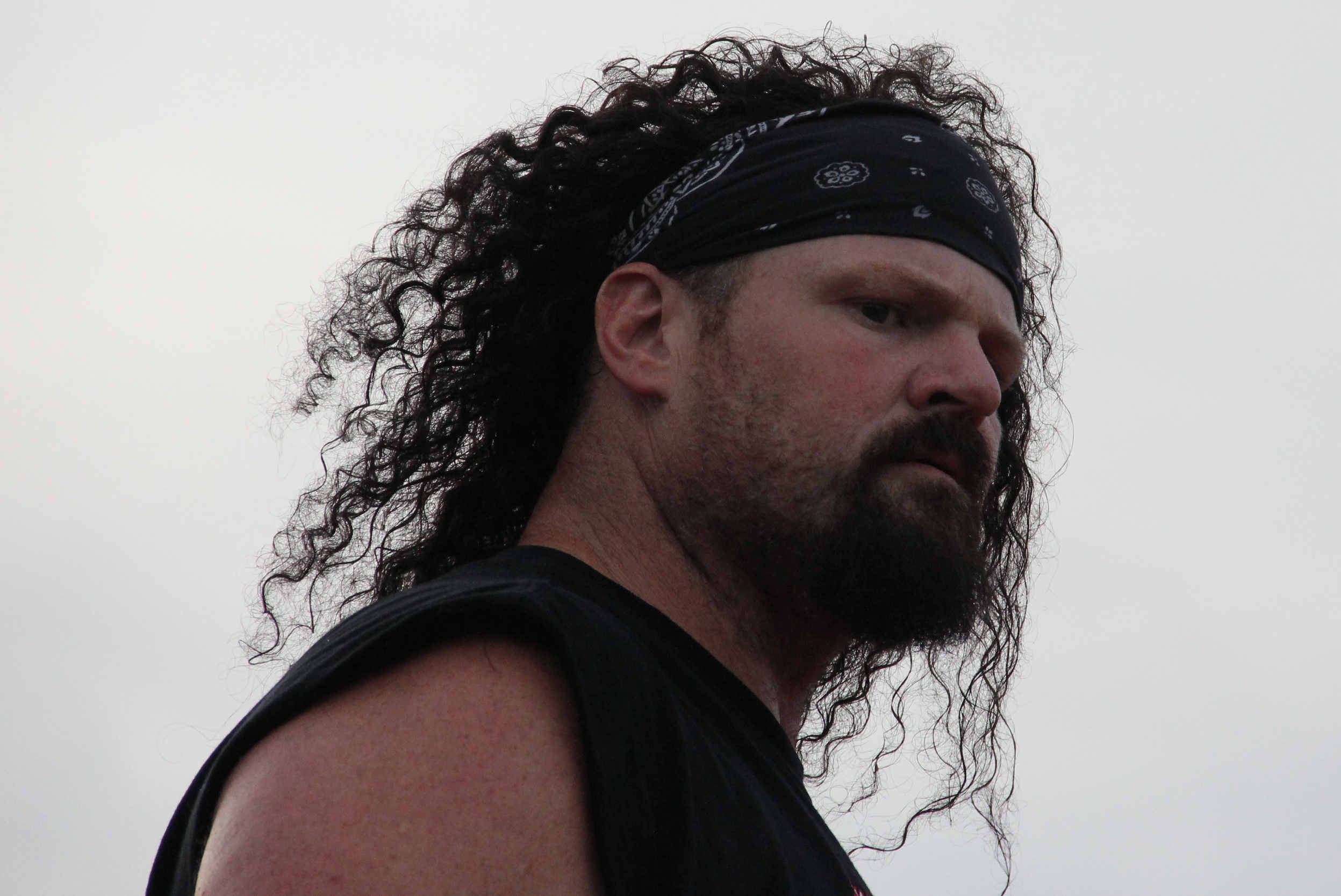
Fuller in June 2013.

In June 2007 he wrestled for URW Ultimate Rings Wars out of Fall River Ma and ended the management of The Mind

On December 28, 2007, Fuller defeated Brian Fury to win the NECW Triple Crown Heavyweight Championship in Quincy, Massachusetts.

On June 27, 2008, Fuller and tag team partner Fred Sampson defeated The Blowout Boys to become the new Chaotic Wrestling Tag Team Champions.

In 2008 Fuller competed for New Japan Pro-Wrestling (NJPW), where he formed a tag team with Giant Bernard. He is also a singles competitor in the New Jersey–based ISPW and the New England–based Big Time Wrestling (BTW).

Fuller wrestled his final match in 2014.

During his career, Fuller appeared as an extra in many movies and commercials. Including a football player in The Game Plan starring The Rock as well as the bouncer in "The Fighter".

== Professional wrestling style and persona ==
Fuller was frequently known by the nicknames of "The Lumberjack" and "Big". His finishing moves included a reverse piledriver known as the Fuller Effect and a spinning heel kick.

== Personal life ==
Fuller is married and has two children.

== Championships and accomplishments ==
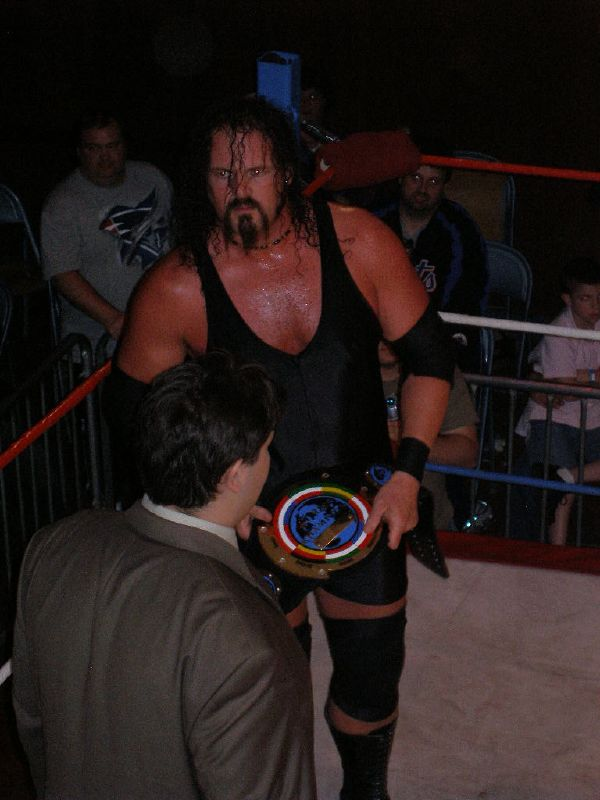
Fuller as the TRP Heavyweight Champion in 2007.

- Chaotic Wrestling
  - Chaotic Wrestling Heavyweight Championship (1 time)
  - Chaotic Wrestling Tag Team Championship (1 time) – with Fred Sampson
- Eastern Wrestling Alliance
  - EWA Heavyweight Championship (1 time)
- New England Championship Wrestling
  - NECW Triple Crown Heavyweight Championship (1 time)
- New England Wrestling Association
  - NEWA Heavyweight Championship (4 times)
  - NEWA Interstate Championship (1 time)
  - NEWA Tag Team Championship (1 time) – with Jack Tanner
- NWA New England
  - NWA New England Heavyweight Championship (1 time)
  - NWA New England Brass Knuckles Championship (1 time)
- NWA Southwest
  - NWA World Tag Team Championship (1 time) – with Knuckles Nelson
- Powerhouse Wrestling
  - PW Tag Team Championship (1 time) – with Jimmy "Jact" Crash
- Pro Wrestling Illustrated
  - PWI ranked him No. 189 of the 500 best singles wrestlers of the PWI 500 in 2009
- Whaling City Wrestling
  - WCW Tag Team Championship (1 time) – with "Sweet" Scott Ashworth
- Yankee Pro Wrestling / Top Rope Promotions
  - YPW/TRP Heavyweight Championship (1 time)
