= Slyck Wagner Brown =

Jamaican born professional wrestler (born 1979)

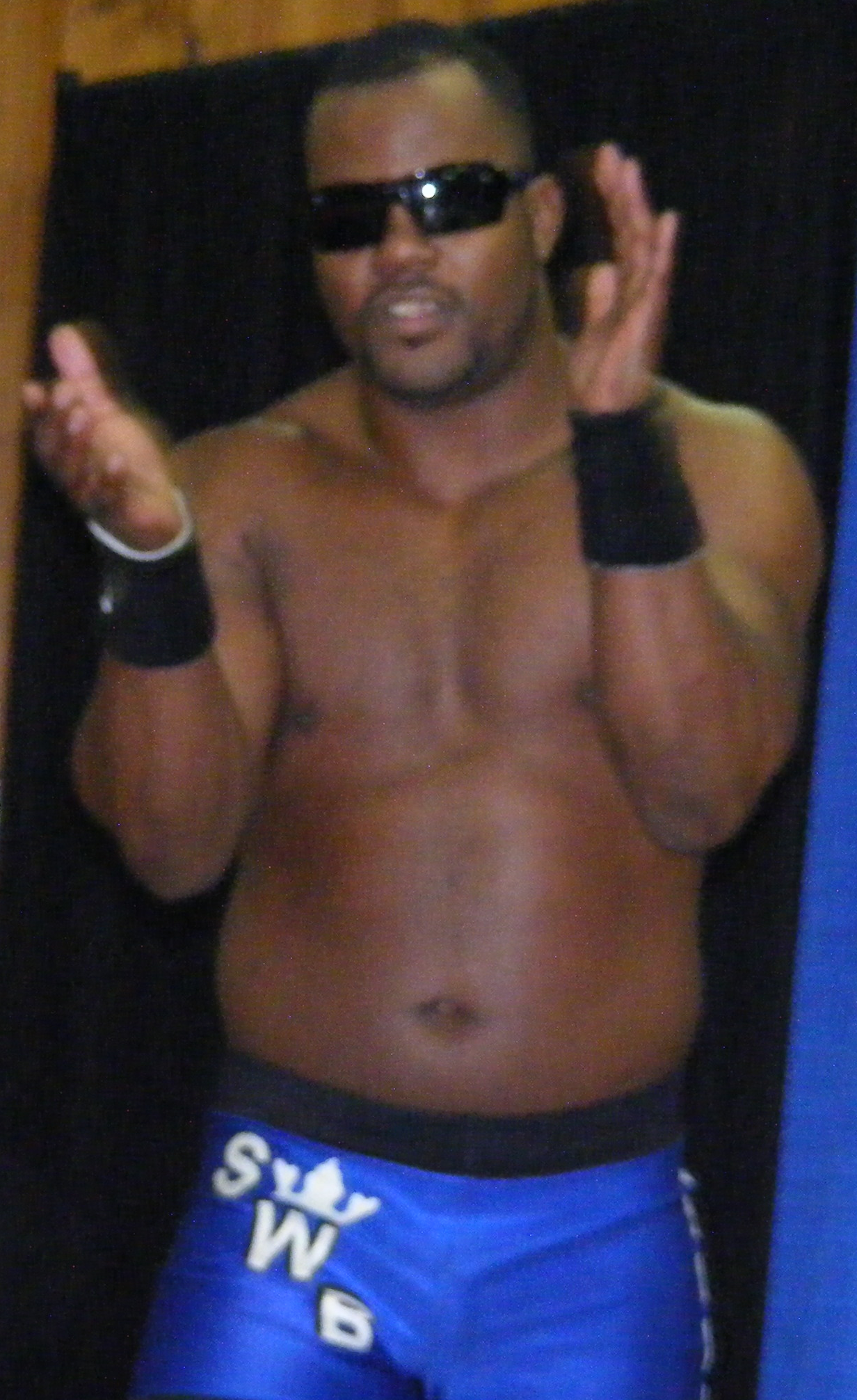
- Brown in November 2010.

Personal information
- Born: Wagner Brown; September 5, 1979 (age 46) Kingston, Jamaica
- Website: SWB4Real.Com

Professional wrestling career
- Ring name(s): Slyck Wagner Brown; SWB; Underground King
- Billed height: 6 ft 2 in (188 cm)
- Billed weight: 235 lb (107 kg)
- Billed from: "Boston, MA by way of Kingston, Jamaica"
- Trained by: Killer Kowalski
- Debut: 1997

Wagner Brown (born September 5, 1979) is a Jamaican born professional wrestler, better known by his ring name, SWB or Slyck Wagner Brown. Brown currently wrestles on the Independent circuit in the Northeastern United States. Additionally, SWB was appointed head trainer at Killer Kowalski's school in Boston. Brown also had a longtime association with women's wrestler April Hunter. The duo held tag team titles together in Jersey All Pro Wrestling and Pro-Pain Pro Wrestling. Brown now runs his wrestling training school, Test of Strength, out of East Hartford, Connecticut and runs monthly shows.

== Professional wrestling career ==
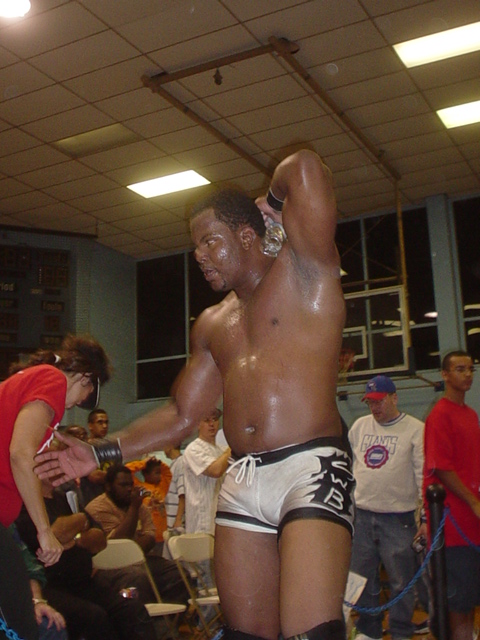
Brown in 2005.

Brown began wrestling in 1997, joining Critical Mass Wrestling. He was trained at Killer Kowalski's school. He also learned ring psychology with Tom Howard at UPW. For the first several years of his career, Brown predominantly wrestled in the New England area. He won his first championship in February 2001, New England Championship Wrestling's NECW Championship.

In January 2005, Brown and his partner Johnny Heartbreaker were defeated by Hurricane and Rosey on an episode of World Wrestling Entertainment's Sunday Night Heat.

Brown has also often teamed with female wrestler April Hunter. Together the duo has won Pro-Pain Pro Wrestling (3PW)'s Tag Team Championship and Jersey All Pro Wrestling (JAPW)'s Tag Team Championship. In 2002, Brown and Hunter began working for NWA Cyberspace. In April 2005, Brown, the current NWA Cyberspace Champion wrestled against Jeff Jarrett for the NWA World Heavyweight Championship. In Cyberspace, Brown had a feud with Rodney Mack. In 2004 made an appearance in Puerto Rico for the International Wrestling Association.

Brown returned to England to wrestle for Superstars of Wrestling in October 2016. Brown runs a professional wrestling academy in East Hartford, Connecticut called Test of Strength Wrestling.

== Personal life ==
Brown was born in Jamaica but grew up in Boston.

== Championships and accomplishments ==
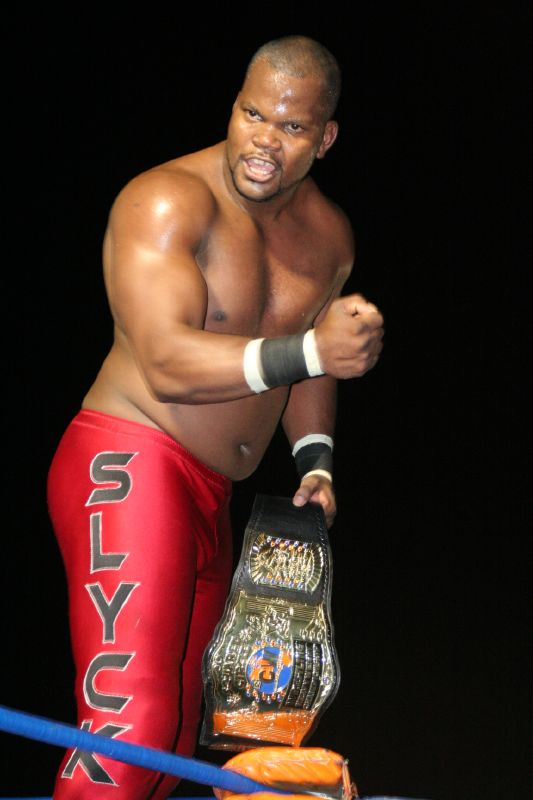
Brown as the 2CW Heavyweight Champion in August 2008.

- Allegheny Mountain Wrestling Federation
  - AMWF Heavyweight Championship (1 time)
- Assault Championship Wrestling
  - ACW Heavyweight Championship (1 time)
  - ACW Great American Championship (2 times)
- Big Time Wrestling (Massachusetts)
  - BTW Tag Team Championship (2 times, current) - with Tre the Smooth Operatin' Gangsta
- Chaotic Wrestling
  - CW New England Championship (1 time)
  - CW Television Championship (1 time)
- Connecticut Wrestling Entertainment
  - CTWE Heavyweight Championship (1 time)
- CyberSpace Wrestling Federation
  - CSWF Heavyweight Championship (1 time)
- Defiant Pro Wrestling
  - DPW Heavyweight Championship (1 time)
- Immortal Championship Wrestling
  - ICW Heavyweight Championship (1 time)
- Jersey All Pro Wrestling
  - JAPW Heavyweight Championship (1 time)
  - JAPW Tag Team Championship (1 time) - with April Hunter
- Jersey Championship Wrestling
  - JCW Championship (1 time)
- Millennium Wrestling Federation
  - MWF Heavyweight Championship (3 times)
- NWA New England
  - NWA New England Heavyweight Championship (1 time)
  - NWA New England Television Championship (1 time)
  - NWA New England Tag Team Championship (1 time)^{1} - with Jason Rage and Luis Ortiz
- New England Championship Wrestling
  - NECW Heavyweight Championship (3 times)
- New England Pro Wrestling Hall of Fame
  - Hall of Fame (2015)
- Pro-Pain Pro Wrestling
  - 3PW World Heavyweight Championship (1 time)
  - 3PW Tag Team Championship (1 time) - with April Hunter
- Pro Wrestling Illustrated
  - PWI ranked him #278 of the 500 best singles wrestlers of the PWI 500 in 2005
- Southern Championship Wrestling Florida
  - SCW Florida Heavyweight Championship (1 time)
- Squared Circle Wrestling
  - 2CW Heavyweight Championship (2 times)
- Test Of Strength Wrestling
  - TOS Championship (1time)
  - TOS Tag Team Championship (1 time)
  - K-1 Classic Championship (1 time)
- Ultimate Wrestling Federation
  - UWF Heavyweight Championship (1 time)
- USA Pro Wrestling
- USA Pro Xtreme Championship (1 time)
  - UPW United States Heavyweight Championship (1 time)
- World Star Wrestling
  - WSW Heavyweight Championship (1 time)
  - WSW Television Championship (2 times)
- World Xtreme Wrestling
  - WXW Television Championship (1 time)
- Xcite Wrestling
  - Xcite International Championship (1 time)

^{1}Wagner held the NWA New England Tag Team Championship with Jason Rage and Luis Ortiz under the Freebird Rule.
