= New England Championship Wrestling =

American independent professional wrestling promotion

- Acronym: NECW
- Founded: 2000
- Defunct: 2019
- Style: American Wrestling
- Headquarters: Jamaica Plain, Massachusetts, United States
- Founder: Sheldon Goldberg
- Owner: Atlantic Sports Promotions
- Parent: United Wrestling Network
- Sister: World Women's Wrestling
- Website: www.necw.tv

New England Championship Wrestling (NECW) is a semi-active independent professional wrestling promotion based in the Northeastern United States that promoted events from 2000 to 2019, owned and operated by Sheldon Goldberg. Its roster included independent wrestlers Antonio "The Promise" Thomas, Slyk Wagner Brown and Rick Fuller. Its women's division, World Women's Wrestling, included Ariel, Sumie Sakai, Alere Little Feather, Riptide, Nikki Roxx, Lexxus, April Hunter, Malia Hosaka and Mercedes Martinez.

World Wrestling Entertainment wrestlers Kofi Kingston, John Cena, Kenny Dykstra, Sasha Banks and R. J. Brewer also competed in the promotion during their early careers. Former WWE announcer and current Ring of Honor announcer Kevin Kelly worked as a booker for the promotion.

== History ==
Former editor of the Mat Marketplace newsletter, Sheldon Goldberg had been involved with promoters Tony Rumble and Paul Heyman in bringing Michinoku Pro to the United States during the late 1990s. By September 2000, Goldberg himself began holding professional wrestling events in the Boston-area, successfully selling out local venues such as Good Time Emporium in Somerville and the National Guard Armory in Quincy. Over the next several years, the promotion developed a strong following based on its traditional "family-friendly" style of professional wrestling as an alternative to the adult themed sports entertainment adopted by World Wrestling Entertainment.

In 2004, the promotion became the first to produce a weekly wrestling TV show specifically produced for distribution on the Internet through its affiliate NECW.tv website. Its weekly internet broadcasts eventually grew to an average of over 20,000 viewers per week in over 40 countries around the world. Its exposure was further increased through DVD releases of yearly supercards such as the Iron 8 Championship Tournament.

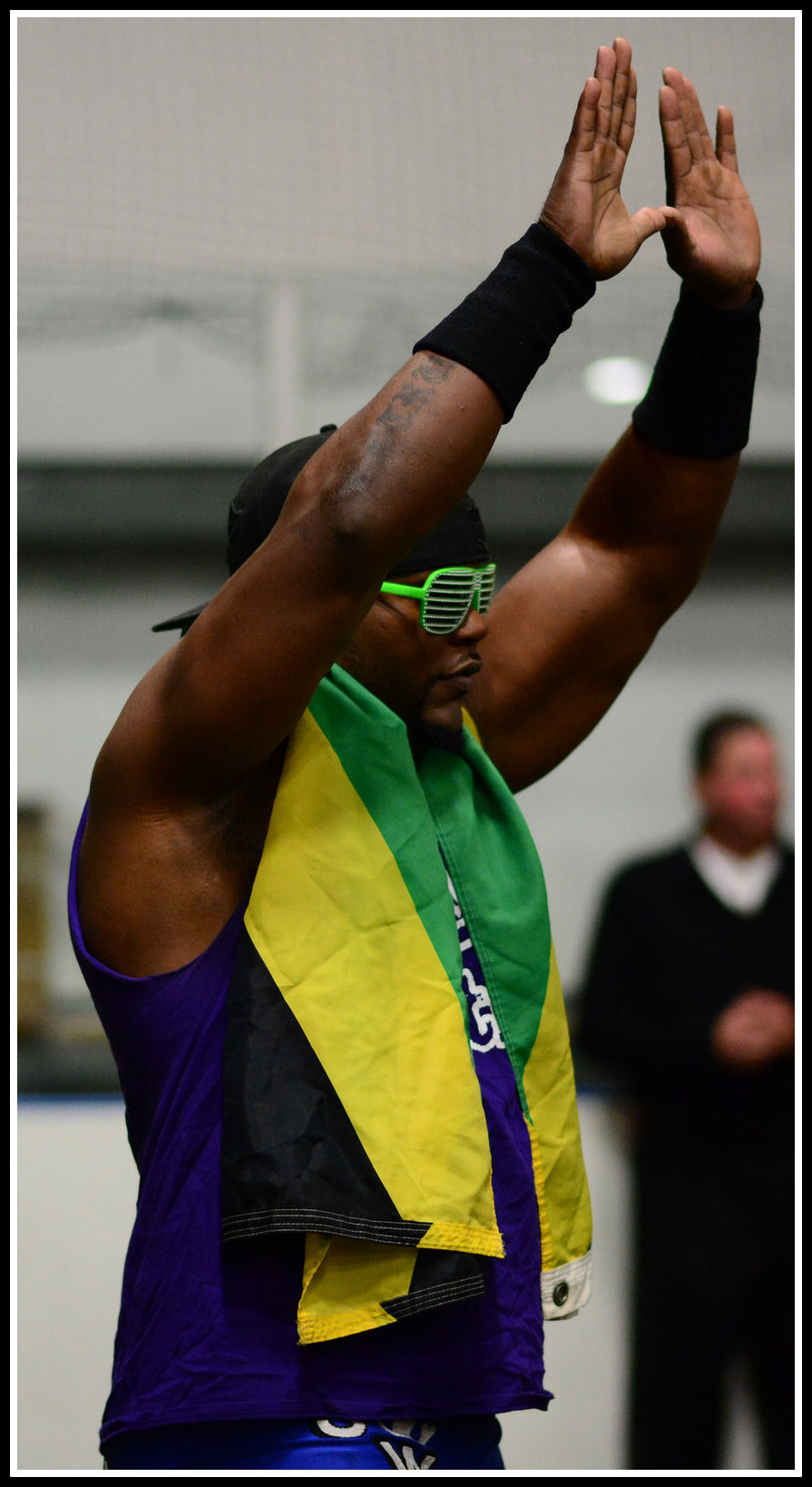
Slyck Wagner Brown's entrance at a 2015 NECW show

In March 2006, New England Championship Wrestling merged with PWF Mayhem and the company operated under the New England Championship Wrestling brand. On August 16, 2006, the merged companies unified their championship titles in an interpromotional event in Quincy, Massachusetts. The event saw PWF Mayhem Tag Team Champions The Canadian Superstars (J-Busta & Dave Cole) defeat The Wild Boys (Billy King & Mike Lynch) for the NECW Unified Tag Team Championship, PWF Mayhem Junior Heavyweight Champion "The Talent" T.J. Richter defeated "Big Guns" Frankie Arion for the NECW Unified Television Championship and PWF Mayhem Heavyweight Champion "The Human Nightmare" Evan Siks defeated D.C. Dillinger for the NECW Undisputed Triple Crown Championship.

Also in March 2006, the company launched World Women's Wrestling, an all-female offshoot of the main NECW promotion.

Following its "Toxic Waltz" event on November 6, 2010, the merged company ceased operations due to a split between founder, Sheldon Goldberg and the PWF faction of Matt West, Kyle White and Roy Rossi. NECW was dormant until May 14, 2011, when the company returned with a benefit show in Carver, Massachusetts. The promotion has returned to active status running regular events mostly throughout the Greater Boston area, while the revived PWF Northeast promotion only lasted until October 2013, when it ceased operations.

After the split with the PWF promoters, NECW had a 90 week run on local broadcast TV station WMFP. NECW continued running regular events and Internet TV shows up until October 2017 when promoter Sheldon Goldberg suffered a badly broken shoulder in a fall. After his recovery, the promotion resumed on a much lighter schedule and put on two charity fundraisers in 2018 and 2019. Once the pandemic hit, NECW had abandoned plans to run live events, but in 2020 NECW released a 20th Anniversary Collection on YouTube, consisting of 20 matches that represented 20 years of the promotion.

Sheldon Goldberg is largely retired after a series of health issues. Over the past few years he has written and published a series of five critically acclaimed novels. The promotion's YouTube channel remains active drawing thousands of viewers each month. The company also plans to produce a Best of NECW TV series in the near future.

== Championships ==
Championship	Current champion(s)	Previous champion(s)	Date won	Location
NECW Heavyweight Champion	Todo Loco	Mike McCarthy	July 2, 2016	Brockton, Massachusetts
NECW Television Champion	Chris Escobar	Todo Loco	May 21, 2016	Abington, Massachusetts
NECW Tag Team Champions	The Heavy Hitters(Shady Shay Cash and Frank Champion)	The Regulators(Jack Maverick and Brute Van Slyke)	September 10, 2016	Wakefield, Massachusetts
World Women's Wrestling Championship	Vanity Vixsin	Alexxis Neveah	September 10, 2016	Wakefield, Massachusetts
Iron 8 Championship Tournament	Todo Loco	Brad Hollister	June 11, 2016	Wakefield, Massachusetts

=== Iron 8 Championship Tournament ===
The Iron 8 Championship was a trademark annual event hosted by NECW. Eight wrestlers were selected from inside and outside of NECW to compete in four single elimination matches, in which the winners of the four matches competed in a 45-minute ironman match to crown an Iron 8 Champion. The 2014 winner also became NECW Heavyweight Champion after previous titleholder Slyck Wagner Brown suffered an injury. The event was not held in 2015.

Year	Name	Date	Location
2004	"Revolution" Chris Venom	August 22, 2004	Somerville, MA
2005	"The Pinnacle" Paul Lombardi	October 15, 2005	Framingham, MA
2006	"Die Hard" Eddie Edwards	June 23, 2006	Quincy, MA
2007	"Die Hard" Eddie Edwards	June 9, 2007	Brockton, MA
2008	"The Golden Greek" Alex Arion	May 31, 2008	Quincy, MA
2009	Antonio Thomas	May 30, 2009	Quincy, MA
2010	"Handsome" Johnny Hayes	May 1, 2010	Somerset, MA
2014	Brad Hollister	May 10, 2014	Beverly, MA
2016	Todo Loco	June 11, 2016	Wakefield, MA

=== The Toxic Waltz ===
The Toxic Waltz was an annual event that originated in PWF Mayhem. The Toxic Waltz was a ten-man gauntlet in which the winner received a Triple Crown Championship match at the winter showcase; Genesis.

Year	Winner	Date	Location
2005	"The Human Nightmare" Evan Siks	September 16, 2005	Quincy, MA
2006	"Straight Edge" Brian Fury	September 30, 2006	Quincy, MA
2007	Max Bauer	December 28, 2007	Quincy, MA
2008	"The Golden Greek" Alex Arion ^{1}	November 1, 2008	Quincy, MA
2009	"The Real Deal" Brandon Locke	November 21, 2009	Quincy, MA
2010	"Handsome" Johnny Hayes	November 6, 2010	Quincy, MA

=== Notes ===
^{1}Arion was the 9th man to lose in the match, but because the man who pinned him ("The Masked Enforcer") revealed himself to be Max Bauer (who wasn't cleared to compete that night), Sheldon Goldberg gave the win to Arion by default.

== Move to cable TV ==
On August 9, 2009, at NECW's 9th anniversary show, NECW announced that starting on January 8, 2010, NECW matches would air at 4–5 p.m. on Fridays on Comcast SportsNet New England. That makes NECW the first pro wrestling promotion on CSNNE since the channel (then Fox Sports Net New England) aired TNA Impact! from 2004 to 2005. NECW was to tape the debut broadcast for CSNNE on December 19, 2009, in Quincy, Massachusetts, but postponed the taping due to inclement weather. The first 4 episodes were posted on NECW's website after technical issues forced the show's debut on CSNNE to be delayed until February 2010.

During that time, CSNNE informed NECW that due to a network obligation they could not live up to the originally contracted Friday afternoon time slot for the term of the contract. The show was moved by mutual agreement to airing as a weekly original program on the Comcast On Demand service throughout New England.

This was the first time a weekly pro wrestling show has been distributed in this manner and is another pioneering effort by NECW, similar to when NECW began offering weekly original wrestling programming via the Internet more than 5 years ago, long before there was a YouTube or a Hulu.

New England Championship Wrestling on Comcast On Demand aired 52 episodes in 2010, seen in a potential 2.2 million homes throughout portions of 5 of the 6 New England states. The contract was not renewed at the end of 2010. All of the 2010 programs can be viewed on NECW's Vimeo channel at http://www.vimeo.com/necw

== Return ==
In March 2011, Sheldon Goldberg, on his radio show, announced that NECW would resume regular operations with an event in Carver, Massachusetts, on May 14, 2011.

On February 8, 2012, NECW announced that the promotion had joined the National Wrestling Alliance. In October 2012, after a change in the ownership of the National Wrestling Alliance, NECW decided not to renew its membership in the NWA.

== Broadcast TV ==
On February 20, 2013, New England Championship Wrestling announced plans to make their broadcast television debut on local station WMFP in approximately 2.3 million homes throughout the Greater Boston, Metro west, Blackstone Valley area as well as north into southern New Hampshire and the southernmost tip of Maine. Their 30-minute program began airing on the station Thursday nights at 12:30 a.m. starting April 4, 2013.

== See also ==
- List of National Wrestling Alliance territories
- List of independent wrestling promotions in the United States
