= List of former International World Class Championship Wrestling personnel =

This is a list of professional wrestlers and personalities that performed in the different incarnations of the International World Class Championship Wrestling promotion from:

- 1985-1991 (as International Championship Wrestling)
- 1991-1995 (as International World Class Championship Wrestling)

== Alumni ==
=== Male wrestlers ===
Birth name	Ring name(s)	Tenure	Ref
Christopher Adams^{†}	Chris Adams	1988	
Kevin Adkisson	Kevin von Erich	1991^{4}	
Michael Alegado	King Kaluha; Prince Mike Kaluha; Mike Kaluha; The Hawaiian Hurricane	1985; 1986–1989; 1990–1992; 1995	
Marcelino Alicea	Jose Rivera; Jose Luis Rivera	1989	
Randall Alls	Randy Rose	1986	
Arthur "Afa" Anoai^{†}	Afa	1985	
Leati "Sika" Anoa'i^{†}	Sika	1985	
Rodney Anoa'i^{†}	The Great Kokina	1985	
Theodore Arcidi	Ted Arcidi	1988	
Robert Backlund	Bob Backlund	1985	
Douglas Baker^{†}	Ox Baker	1985–1986	
Michael Brannon	Dr. Red Roberts	1987	
Victor Barajas	Black Gordman	1985	
Marc Bazzle^{†}	The Prankster	1990	
James Bednarski	Scott Putski	1988; 1991; 1995	
Josef Bednarski	Ivan Putski	1986–1987; 1988–1989; 1991; 1995	
Adolfo Bermudez	White Cloud	1992–1993	
Victor Blood	Vic Steamboat	1988–1992	
Nicholas Bockwinkel^{†}	Nick Bockwinkel	1986^{1}	
Larry Booker^{†}	Moondog Spot	1987	
Wayde Bowles^{†}	Rocky Johnson	1988	
Jonathan Boyle^{†}	Lord Jonathan Boyd	1988–1989	
Thomas Brandi	Johnny Gunn; Mr. Fantasy; Tom Brandi	1986–1989; 1991–1992; 1993–1995	
Timothy Brooks^{†}	Killer Tim Brooks	1985; 1986	
Dennis Bunt	Dennis Allen	1990–1991	
Thomas Cairo	Tom Cairo	1988	
John Callahan	John Callahan	1985	
Christopher Candido^{†}	Chris Candido; Mr. Charisma	1992; 1993	
Neil Caricofe^{†}	Neil Superior	1992–1993	
Brian Carreiro^{†}	The Terminator	1986	
Preston Carrington	Tony Ulysses; Caribbean Cyclone; Tony Carrington?	1985; 1988; 1990	
James Carullo	Gino Caruso; Mr. X The Funny Clown	1993–1995	
Bert Centeno	Bert Centeno; Bert Santana	1985–1986; 1988; 1994	
Richard Charland	Richard Charland	1987	
John Charyszyn^{†}	Larry Winters	1985	
Joe Chetti	Tasmaniac Mako	1992	
Eldridge Coleman^{†}	Superstar Billy Graham	1986	
Carlos Colón	Carlos Colón	1984–1985^{4}	
Dennis Condrey	Dennis Condrey	1989–1990	
Ion Croitoru^{†}	Johnny K-9	1988	
Ruben Cruz^{†}	Hercules Ayala	1985–1986^{4}	
Joseph D'Acquisto	The Rochester Roadblock	1989	
Michael Davis^{†}	Mike Davis	1985	
Michael Davis	Bugsy McGraw	1986	
Nicholas DeCarlo	Nick DeCarlo	1988	
Gerry Dellaserra	Rocky Della Serra	1985	
William DeMott	Crash the Eliminator	1994–1995	
Ronald DiMaria	The Star Warrior	1991	
Dominic DeNucci^{†}	Dominic DeNucci	1985	
Brian Donahue	Brian Donahue	1989	
James Duggan	Jim Duggan	1994	
Michael Durham^{†}	Equalizer Zap; Johnny Rotten	1990–1993	
Conrad Efraim^{†}	S. D. Jones	1991	
Adnan El Farthie^{†}	Sheik Adnan Al-Kaissie	1986^{1}	
Rob Elowitch^{†}	Robbie Ellis	1985–1989; 1995	
Douglas Embry	Eric Embry	1985	
James Eschbach	Jimmy Deo	1992–1993	
José Estrada Sr.	The Super Medic	1985^{4}	
Jeff Evans^{†}	Jeff Grippley	1992–1993	
Samuel Fatu	Tonga Kid	1985	
Solofa Fatu Jr.	Tonga Kid #2	1985	
Emmanuel Fernández	Manny Fernandez	1993–1994	
Roy Ferris	The Honky Tonk Man	1991	
Tonga Fifita	King Tonga	1985^{4}	
Richard Fliehr	Ric Flair	1985	
Michael Foley	Cactus Jack; Cactus Jack Foley	1988; 1991	
Joseph Fornini	Joe Savoldi	1985–1989; 1991–1995	
Rudolph Freed	Rudy Diamond	1985	
Gary Fulton^{†}	Charlie Fulton	1985; 1986	
Dory Funk Jr.	Dory Funk Jr.	1985; 1991	
Scott Garland	Scott Taylor	1992–1993	
David Giegold	The Mad Russian; Nikita Mulkovich	1987–1988	
Douglas Gilbert	Doug Gilbert	1989–1990	
Jim Good	Jimmy B. Good; Jimmy B. Goode	1992–1993	
Frank Goodish^{†}	Bruiser Brody	1986; 1987^{4}	
José González	Invader #1	1985^{4}	
Scott Hall^{†}	Scott Hall	1986^{1}	
James Harrell	Boris Zhukov	1986^{1}	
James Harris^{†}	Kamala	1986	
John Harris^{†}	Silo Sam	1986^{1}	
Curtis Hennig^{†}	Curt Hennig	1986^{1}	
Michael Hickenbottom	Shawn Michaels	1986^{1}	
Richard Hoff	G.Q. Stratus	1991–1992	
Timothy Horner	Tim Horner	1985	
Barry Horowitz	Jack Hart	1986	
Curtis Hughes	Mr. Hughes	1994	
Francis Huntington	Jules Strongbow	1985–1986	
Leonard Inzitari	Mario Mancini	1990	
Fredrick Jannetty	Marty Jannetty	1986^{1}	
Michael Jones^{†}	Virgil; Soul Train Jones	1987; 1995	
Tommy Lee Jones^{†}	Tommy Lane	1985	
Lanny Kean Jr.^{†}	Cousin Junior	1987	
Stephen Keirn	Steve Keirn	1988	
Patrick Kelly	H.D. Ryder; H.D. Rider	1994	
Stephen Ketcher^{†}	Chief Gatorwolf; Steve Gatorwolf	1988^{3}	
Kurt Koski^{†}	Rusty Brooks; Super Duper Mario	1986–1987; 1989–1990	
Thomas Laughlin	Tommy Dreamer; Tommy Madison; T.D. Madison; El Diablo	1991; 1993	
Edward Leslie	Brutus Beefcake	1995	
Mark Lewin	The Purple Haze	1986^{4}	
Ray Liachelli	Ray Apollo	1985	
Steven Lombardi	The Brooklyn Brawler	1992; 1995	
Mark LoMonaco	The Terminator	1993–1994	
Pete Lucic	Preston Steele	1989	
Anthony Magliaro^{†}	Tony Rumble; Dungeon Master; Tony Rummell	1984–1990	
James Manley	Jim Powers	1994	
James Maritato	Damien Stone	1993–1995	
Rick Martello^{†}	Big City Mike; Hillbilly Mike	1987; 1993	
Anthony Matteo	Tony Stetson	1988; 1993	
Michael McCord	Austin Idol	1985–1986^{4}	
Mark Mest	Mark Mest	1992–1993	
Troy Mest	Troy Mest	1992–1994	
Jeff Miller	The Metal Maniac	1992; 1994	
Robert Miller^{†}	Butch Miller; Bushwhacker Butch	1985; 1992–1993; 1995	
David Mosier^{†}	Chief Thunder Mountain	1990	
James Neidhart^{†}	Jim Neidhart	1995	
Tommy Norton	Flex Lavender; Mr. Majestic	1992–1993	
Atsushi Onita	Atsushi Onita	1990	
Robert Orton Sr.^{†}	Bob Orton	1988; 1990; 1995	
Robert Orton Jr.	Bob Orton Jr.	1989	
Claude Ouimet^{†}	Gustav the Giant; Giant Gustav	1987–1988	
Phil Pantos	Phil Apollo	1986–1987; 1988–1990	
John Parent^{†}	Drifter Ripper	1992–1993	
Ken Passariello	Ken Passariello	1985	
Kenneth Patera	Ken Patera	1990; 1991	
Alex Pérez	Al Perez	1985	
Paul Perschmann^{†}	Buddy Rose	1985; 1986^{4}	
Josip Peruzovic^{†}	Nikolai Volkoff	1989; 1990; 1992–1993	
Gene Petit^{†}	Cousin Luke	1994	
Theodore Petty^{†}	The Cheetah Kid	1988; 1990	
William Pierce	Chris Michaels	1994	
Thomas Prichard	Tom Prichard	1989	
Anthony Puccio	The Punisher	1989–1990	
Valentino Puccio^{†}	The Henchman	1989–1990	
Duane Putt	Drifter Nomad	1992–1993	
Ronald Reis	SWAT; Swath	1994	
Robert Remus	Sgt. Slaughter	1986^{1}	
John Richardson	Johnny Rich	1986^{1}	
Thomas Richardson	Tommy Rich	1988	
Johnny Rivera	Invader #2	1985^{4}	
Alexander Rizzo^{†}	Alexander the Great	1995	
John Rodriguez	Johnny Rodz	1985	
Richard Rood^{†}	Rick Rude	1991	
Ray Samalonis	Ray Odyssey	1987–1988; 1989–1994	
Michael Santoni Jr.	Primo Carnera III; Mike Fury	1993–1994	
Al Kuyaribo Santos	Dancing Wolf; Chief Dancing Wolf	1992–1993	
Erich Sbraccia	Eric Sbracchia	1986–1990	
Luke Scarpa^{†}	Chief Jay Strongbow	1985	
David Schultz	David Schultz	1985	
Jerry Seavey	Candy Man	1994	
Tetsuo Sekigawa^{†}	Mr. Pogo	1989	
Peter Senerchia	Tazmaniac; Tasmaniac; The Tasmanian Devil; Tasmaniac Noga	1990–1992; 1993	
Michael Sharpe^{†}	Iron Mike Sharpe	1989	
Michael Shaw^{†}	Bastion Booger	1995	
Keith Sheara	Special K Keith Scherer; Keith Sheer	1993	
Robert Shoup	The Pink Assassin; The Wrestling School Dropout	1986; 1989–1995	
Lawrence Shreve	Abdullah The Butcher	1985–1986^{4} 1991	
George Skaaland	George Skaaland	1988	
David Slinker^{†}	Ron Slinker	1986^{4}	
William Smithson^{†}	Moondog Spike	1987–1988	
James Snuka^{†}	Jimmy Snuka	1986^{1} 1992; 1994–1995	
Merced Solis	Tito Santana	1991; 1994–1995	
Douglas Somerson^{†}	Doug Somers	1986^{1}	
David Sontag	Dave Power	1988–1989	
Larry Sontag	Larry Power	1988–1989	
Roberto Soto	Roberto Soto	1986; 1987	
Lester Speight	Wreak Havoc	1995	
John Stuebner	Dr. Johnny Wildside	1991–1993	
Kevin Sullivan^{†}	Kevin Sullivan	1985–1986^{2} 1991	
Mike Sundeck	Mike Sundance; The Invader	1987–1988	
Patrick Tanaka	Pat Tanaka	1991	
William Terry^{†}	Kurt von Hess	1985–	
Philip Theis	Mondo Kleen	1991–1992	
Curtis Thompson	Chip the Firebreaker	1992–1993	
Scott Thompson	Texas Terminator Hoss; Big Hoss	1990	
Ken Timbs^{†}	Ken Timbs	1985–1986	
Thomas Urbanski	The Mad Russian	1990	
Paul Vachon^{†}	Butcher Vachon	1987	
William Vaughn	Lance von Erich	1993	
Hossein Vaziri^{†}	The Iron Sheik	1987; 1988	
Richard Vigneault	Rick Martel	1994; 1995	
James Ware	Koko B. Ware; Koko Ware	1991; 1993; 1994–1995	
Morgus Watson	Morgus the Maniac	1993	
Peter Weeks	Peter Weeks	1993	
Pezavan Whatley^{†}	Pez Whatley	1988	
Lawrence Whistler	Larry Zbyszko	1986^{1}	
Anthony White	Tony Atlas; The Black Scorpion	1987–1990; 1991–1992; 1993–1995	
Brian Wickens	Luke Williams; Bushwhacker Luke	1985; 1992–1993; 1995	
Charles Williams^{†}	Rockin' Rebel	1993–1994	
Mike Williams	Equalizer Zip	1990–1991	
Barry Windham	Barry Windham	1986	
Robert Windham^{†}	Blackjack Mulligan	1986^{2}	
Edward Wiskoski^{†}	Colonel DeBeers	1986^{1}	
Jonathan Wisniski	Greg Valentine	1992–1995	
Barry Wolfe	Dusty Wolfe; Equalizer Zoom; Psycho	1985–1986; 1988; 1990–1991	
Brett Woyan	Brett Sawyer	1988	
Donald Zalesky^{†}	Curly Moe	1990–1991	
Unknown	Adrian Street	1987	
Unknown	Agent Gunn	1994–1995	
Unknown	Agent Maxx	1994–1995	
Unknown	A.J. Steele	1995	
Unknown	Al King	1986	
Unknown	Al "Cornbread" Philips	1990–1991	
Unknown	Ali Pasha; Sheik Ali Pasha	1987	
Unknown	Angelo Gómez	1985^{4}	
Unknown	Bandit Bill Rosey	1987	
Unknown	Big Bad Bob	1994	
Unknown	Big Foot Ali Oop	1986^{1}	
Unknown	Big Mac	1988	
Unknown	Big Sweet William	1990–	
Unknown	Billy Watkins	1992	
Unknown	Black Plague	1993–	
Unknown	Blitzkrieg	1995	
Unknown	Bob Evans	1994	
Unknown	Bob Nash	1993	
Unknown	Bobby Jay	1986^{1}	
Unknown	Bobby Willis	1993–	
Unknown	Boss Hogg Calhoun	1991	
Unknown	Brian Walsh	1986; 1989–1990	
Unknown	Canadian #1	1992	
Unknown	Canadian #2	1992	
Unknown	Cannonball Carmichael	1991	
Unknown	Carlos Kidd	1986	
Unknown	Carlos Mattis	1988	
Unknown	Carolina Crusher #1	1990	
Unknown	Carolina Crusher #2	1990	
Unknown	Carolina Crusher #3	1990	
Unknown	Charlie Brown	1985	
Unknown	Chris Evans	1988; 1993	
Unknown	Chris Gallahad	1986	
Unknown	Cowboy Mike Kasey	1986	
Unknown	Dave Foxx	1986; 1987	
Unknown	The Deadly Dutchman	1992–1993	
Unknown	The Defender	1994–	
Unknown	Diamond Jim	1985	
Unknown	Dino Meltzer	1986	
Unknown	Doc Holiday	1993–	
Unknown	Doink	1994–	
Unknown	Don D. Lux	1993–	
Unknown	Don Rock	1991–	
Unknown	Doug Keck	1992	
Unknown	Duke Snyder	1991 1994–	
Unknown	Dynamite Dan	1993–	
Unknown	Eddie Miranda; Eddie Muranda	1985	
Unknown	Executioner #1	1993–	
Unknown	Executioner #2	1993–	
Unknown	Four Pack Kid	1993–	
Unknown	Frank Goula	1985	
Unknown	Frank Viola	1988	
Unknown	Fred Marzino	1985	
Unknown	The Gambler	1985	
Unknown	Georgia Guerilla #1	1991	
Unknown	Georgia Guerilla #2	1991	
Unknown	G.Q. Madison	1990–1991	
Unknown	Gran Apollo	1985	
Unknown	Gravedigger	1993	
Unknown	The Hangman	1985–	
Unknown	Harley Lewis	1993	
Unknown	The Hollywood Kid	1994	
Unknown	Invader #3	1985	
Unknown	Irish Terry Dundee	1988	
Unknown	Israel Matia	1992	
Unknown	Jackknife Johnny	1993–1994	
Unknown	James Kaiser	1993–	
Unknown	J.D. McSlade	1986	
Unknown	Jerry Ross	1993–	
Unknown	Jim Haley	1986^{1}	
Unknown	Jim Thompson	1995	
Unknown	Jim Williams	1993	
Unknown	Joe Cruel	1990	
Unknown	John Rizzo	1987	
Unknown	Jonathan Holiday; Super Destroyer #1	1988	
Unknown	Johnny B. Goode	1993–	
Unknown	Johnny Goldfinger	1994	
Unknown	Kaos #1	1987	
Unknown	Ken Johnson	1986	
Unknown	Kid Cabassa	1985	
Unknown	Kingpin	1990	
Unknown	Kodiak Bear	1993–1995	
Unknown	L.A. Gore	1993–1994	
Unknown	Larry Hamilton	1985	
Unknown	Leopard Mask	1990	
Unknown	Lightning Lennie	1993	
Unknown	Lord Herculon	1985	
Unknown	Lou Fabiano; Super Destroyer #2	1988	
Unknown	Lumberjack Pierre; The Lumberjack	1988	
Unknown	Mad Dog Rex	1988	
Unknown	Mad Dog Richard	1985	
Unknown	Mad Russian I Masked Russian I	1985	
Unknown	Mad Russian II; Masked Russian II	1985	
Unknown	The Magnificent Maurice	1986	
Unknown	Makumba	1992–1993	
Unknown	Man Mountain Mike	1987	
Unknown	The Mask	1988	
Unknown	Masked Iraqi I	1991	
Unknown	Masked Iraqi II	1991	
Unknown	Matt Logan	1985	
Unknown	Maurice Pride	1988	
Unknown	Mickey Gillian	1987	
Unknown	The Midnight Rocker	1992–1993	
Unknown	Mike Jones	1985	
Unknown	Mike Luna	1993	
Unknown	Mike Powers	1986	
Unknown	Mike Samson	1991–1992	
Unknown	Mike Scroll	1995	
Unknown	Mike Zane	1993	
Unknown	Mr. M	1986	
Unknown	Mr. Somalia	1993–	
Unknown	New Jersey Nightmare #1	1991	
Unknown	New Jersey Nightmare #2	1991	
Unknown	Nick Ferrero	1991	
Unknown	The Ninja	1992–1993	
Unknown	Paul Jackson	1993–	
Unknown	Pete Mitchell	1985	
Unknown	The Pink Angel	1986	
Unknown	Powerblaster Activator	1994	
Unknown	Powerblaster Blast	1994	
Unknown	The Prince of Pain	1985	
Unknown	The Rebel	1991	
Unknown	Rick Needy	1993	
Unknown	Ricky Stallone	1987	
Unknown	Ricky Starr	1993	
Unknown	Rock Steady	1986^{1}	
Unknown	Rocky Jones	1988; 1992–1993	
Unknown	Rocky Raymond; Boston Bad Boy #1	1988	
Unknown	Ron Sexton	1985–1986	
Unknown	The Russian Assassin	1985	
Unknown	The Russian Brute	1988– 1990	
Unknown	The Scab	1993	
Unknown	Scorpion #1	1986	
Unknown	Scorpion #2	1986	
Unknown	Scott Williams	1986^{1}	
Unknown	Slam	1990–	
Unknown	Steve Cybert; Steve Cyford	1993–	
Unknown	Steve Kelly	1992–1993	
Unknown	Striker Lewis	1993–	
Unknown	Stu Braxton	1995	
Unknown	Super Ninja Destroyer Machine	1992–	
Unknown	Swede Williams	1991	
Unknown	Taras Bulba	1985	
Unknown	Ted Streeter	1991	
Unknown	Teddy Brown	1988	
Unknown	Tequila Ramon; Dark Angel	1992–1993	
Unknown	Terry Daniels	1985–1986	
Unknown	Tex Mex	1993–	
Unknown	The Thing	1988^{3}	
Unknown	Tiger Tim Conway	1986	
Unknown	Tombstone; Eric Tombstone	1987	
Unknown	Tony Roma	1991	
Unknown	T.T. Krunchski	1990	
Unknown	Tyree Pride	1986	
Unknown	Victor Jovica	1985	
Unknown	Vinnie Biondo	1992–1993	
Unknown	Will Wilson	1993	
Unknown	William Augus	1987	

=== Female wrestlers ===
Birth name	Ring name(s)	Tenure	Ref
Linda Joaquin	Linda Dallas	1986	
Debrah Ann Miceli	Madusa Miceli	1993	
Debbera Ransom	Sheena; Sheena the Voodoo Queen	1988	
Sherri Russell^{†}	Sherri Martel	1986^{1}	
Shirl Sprague^{†}	Comrade Orga	1986	
Diane Syms	Misty Blue Simmes; Misty Blue	1985–1986	
Unknown	Amber Allen	1988	
Unknown	Ashley Allen	1988	
Unknown	Bobby Facelly	1988	
Unknown	Bodyguard Venus	1988	
Unknown	Debbie Kovak	1988	
Unknown	Despina Montaguas	1986^{1}	
Unknown	Heidi Lee Morgan	1988	
Unknown	Jamie West	1988; 1993	
Unknown	Kat LeRoux	1986	
Unknown	Kathy King Kade; Katy Kincaid	1988	
Unknown	The Metal Maiden	1994	
Unknown	Michele Paris	1985	
Unknown	Miss Peaches	1987	
Unknown	Olympia Hightower	1988	
Unknown	Phantom Mist	1994	
Unknown	The Velvet Angel	1987	

=== Midget wrestlers ===
Birth name	Ring name(s)	Tenure	Ref
Frank Burns Jr.^{†}	Frankie Burns	1990; 1993–1994	
Steve Eisenhower	Butch Cassidy	1985	
Marcel Gauthier^{†}	Sky Low Low	1987	
Claude Giroux	Dink the Clown	1995	
Raymond Kessler	The Haiti Kid	1985	
Unknown	The Amazing Martine; The Great Martine	1987; 1993–1994	
Unknown	Little Hercules	1993	
Unknown	Little Samoan	1995	
Unknown	Mighty Doom	1993	

=== Stables and tag teams ===
Tag team/Stable(s)	Members	Tenure(s)
The Army of Darkness	Kevin Sullivan, The Purple Haze, Ron Slinker, The Fallen Angel and King Curtis Iaukea	1986
The Billion Dollar Babies	Mike Samson and G.Q. Stratus	1991–1992
The Blackhearts	Apocalypse and Destruction	
The Border Patrol	Agent Gunn and Agent Maxx	1994–1995
The Boston Bad Boys	Rocky Raymond and Tony Rumble	1987–1988
The Brotherhood	Tony Rumble, Tony Atlas, The Tazmaniac, Big Hoss and The Undertakers	1989–1992
The Canadians	Canadian #1 and Canadian #2	1992
The Carolina Crushers	Carolina Crusher #1, Carolina Crusher #2 and Carolina Crusher #3	1990
The Cheetah Kid & Leopard Mask	The Cheetah Kid and Leopard Mask	1990
The Drifters	Drifter Nomad and Drifter Ripper	1992–1993
The Dynamic Duo	Eric Sbraccia and Phil Apollo	1989–1990
Ebony & Ivory	Al Phillips and G.Q. Madison	1990
The Equalizers	Equalizer Zip, Equalizer Zap and Equalizer Zoom	1990–1991
The Executioners	Executioner #1 and Executioner #2	1993
The Georgia Guerillas	Georgia Guerilla #1 and Georgia Guerilla #2	1991
The Fabulous Blondes / The Hollywood Blondes	Ken Timbs and Dusty Wolfe	1985–1986
The Heart Throb Four	Mr. Charisma, Mr. Fantasy, Mr. Majestic and Mr. Romeo	1992
The Invaders	Invader #1, Invader #2 and Invader #3	1985
The Intimidators / The Mest Brothers	Mark Mest and Troy Mest	1992–1993
The Lethal Weapons	Dennis Condrey and Doug Gilbert	1989–1990
The Mad Russians / The Masked Russians	Mad Russian #1 and Mad Russian #2	1985
The Madison Brothers	G.Q. Madison and T.D. Madison	1991
The Masked Iraqis	Masked Iraqi #1 and Masked Iraqi #2	1991
The Midnight Rockers	Marty Jannetty and Shawn Michaels	1986
The Moondogs	Moondog Spot and Moondog Spike	1987
The New Jersey Nightmares	New Jersey Nightmare #1 and New Jersey Nightmare #2	1991
The New York Rockers / The Rock and Roll Rockers	Al Perez and Joe Savoldi	1985
The Party Animals	Party Animal #1 and Party Animal #2	1992
The Polish Powers	Ivan Putski and Scott Putski	1988; 1991; 1995
The Power Blasters	Powerblaster Activator and Powerblaster Blast	1994
The Power Twins	Larry Power and Dave Power	1988–1989
The Rock 'n' Roll RPMs	Mike Davis and Tommy Lane	1985
The Russian Brutes	Nikolai Volkoff and The Russian Brute	1990
The S&S Express	Joe Savoldi and Vic Steamboat	1988
The Samoan Gangsters	Mack Daddy Kane and Sammy the Silk	1995
The Scorpions	Scorpion #1 and Scorpion #2	1986
The Sheepherders / The Bushwhackers	Butch Miller and Luke Williams	1985; 1992–1993; 1995
The Sioux War Party	White Cloud and Dancing Wolf	1992–1993
The Soul Patrol	Tony Atlas and Rocky Johnson	1988
The Super Destroyers	Super Destroyer #1 and Super Destroyer #2	1988
The Tasmaniacs / The Tazmaniacs	Noga and Mako	1992
The Tex-Mex Connection	Tequila Ramon and Professor 4 Pack	1993
The Tropical Terrors	Hawaiian Hurricane and Caribbean Cyclone	1990
The Undertakers	Henchman and Punisher	1989–1990
The Wild Bunch	Chief Thunder Mountain and Texas Terminator Hoss	1990
The Wild Samoans	Afa and Sika	1985

=== Managers and valets ===
Birth name	Ring name(s)	Tenure	Ref
Jonathan Boyle^{†}	Jonathan Boyd	1988	
Kevin Casey	Kevin "The Truth" Casey	1991–1992	
Marcel Gauthier^{†}	Sky Low Low	1988	
Paul Heyman	Paul E. Dangerously	1989–1990	
Curtis Iaukea III^{†}	King Curtis Iaukea	1986^{4}	
Lisa Keller	Nurse Vanessa Feelgood	1991–1993	
Anthony Magliaro^{†}	Tony Rumble	1989–1992	
Nancy Toffoloni^{†}	The Fallen Angel	1985–1986^{4}	
Gary Williams^{†}	Gary Hart	1986^{4}	
Darren Wise	Dirty Darren Deeds; Darren Wise	1992–1993	
Unknown	Doc Diamond	1990	
Unknown	The Duke	1988–1990	
Unknown	The Whip Woman	1988	

=== Commentators and interviewers ===
Birth name	Ring name(s)	Tenure	Ref
William Apter	Bill Apter	1990–1992	Color commentator Host of PWI Conference
Milt Avruskin^{†}	Milt Avruskin	1987	Play-by-play commentator
Douglas Baker^{†}	Ox Baker	1991	Color commentator
Jonathan Boyle^{†}	Lord Jonathan Boyd	1988	Color commentator
Brian Clarke	Brian Bristol	1988–1991	Color commentator Ring announcer
Christopher Cruise	Chris Cruise	1991	Play-by-play commentator
Page Falkinburg	Diamond Dallas Page	1990	Host of The Diamond District
Mario Fornini Jr.	Mario Savoldi	1987	Color commentator
Tom Fornini	Tommy Fornini; The Mediator	1988–1989	
Paul Heyman	Paul E. Dangerously	1989–1990	Color commentator Host of The Danger Zone
Curtis Iaukea III^{†}	King Curtis Iaukea	1986	Color commentator
Francis Labiak^{†}	Gordon Solie	1985	Play-by-play commentator
Richard Landrum	Rich Landrum	1986	Play-by-play commentator
Leslie Malady	Les Thatcher	1985–1986	Play-by-play commentator
Anthony Magliaro^{†}	Tony Rumble	1989–1992	Color commentator Host of The Rumble Seat
Mike Mittman	Mike Mittman	1992	
Aloysius Thesz^{†}	Lou Thesz	1985–1986	Color commentator
Unknown	Brian Webster	1991–1995	
Unknown	Bob Dow	1989–1990	Play-by-play commentator
Unknown	Dawna	1990	Host of the ICW Teen Report
Unknown	Steve Budd	1985–1987	Color commentator Ring announcer
Unknown	Terry Daniels	1986	

=== Referees ===
Birth name	Ring name(s)	Tenure	Ref
Sal Corrente	Sal Corrente	1986	
William Dailey	Billy Silverman	1984–1985	
Tom Fornini	Tommy Fornini; The Mediator	1984–1995	Head referee
William Sierra	Bill Alfonso		
Unknown	Jack Savage		
Unknown	Scott Dickinson		

=== Other personnel ===
Birth name	Ring name(s)	Tenure	Ref
Jonathan Boyle^{†}	Jonathan Boyd	1988	Booker
John Callahan	Sgt. Muldoon; John Callahan	1985	Road agent
Mario Fornini Sr.^{†}	Angelo Savoldi	1984–1995	Promoter
Mario Fornini Jr.	Mario Savoldi	1984–1995	Promoter; Booker
Paul Heyman	Paul E. Dangerously	1989	Booker
Anthony Magliaro^{†}	Tony Rumble	1990–1992	Booker
Robert Miller	Butch Miller	1985	Booker
Anthony Sanizzaro Jr.	Tony Santos Jr.	1986	Booker
Kevin Sullivan	Kevin Sullivan	1986	Booker
Brian Wickens	Luke Williams	1985	Booker

Company name to Year
Company name:	Years:
International Championship Wrestling	1984–1991
International World Class Championship Wrestling	1991–1995
International Championship Wrestling	1995
Notes
^{†} Indicates they are deceased.
^{‡} Indicates they died while they were employed with International Championship Wrestling / International World Class Championship Wrestling.
^{1} Indicates they were part of a talent exchange with the American Wrestling Association.
^{2} Indicates they were part of a talent exchange with the Championship Wrestling from Florida.
^{3} Indicates they were part of a talent exchange with World Class Championship Wrestling.
^{4} Indicates they were part of a talent exchange with the World Wrestling Council.
