= Tony Puccio =

American professional wrestler (born 1962)

Personal information
- Born: Anthony Puccio; January 9, 1962 Bronx, New York

Professional wrestling career
- Ring name(s): Tony Puccio; Henchman; Mayhem; Double Trouble #2
- Billed height: 6 ft 0 in (1.83 m)
- Billed weight: 265 lb (120 kg)
- Trained by: Tony Altomare
- Debut: 1987
- Retired: 1997

Anthony Puccio was a professional wrestler best known under the ring names Tony Puccio and Henchman and teaming with his brother Val Puccio as "The Undertakers" and later as "Double Trouble".

== Professional wrestling career ==
=== Early career (1987-1989) ===
Trained by Tony Altomare, Puccio began his wrestling career in 1987 and worked for various northeast U.S. independent promotions.

=== International World Class Championship Wrestling (1989 - 1991) ===
Teaming with his brother Val the duo formed a tag team called "The Undertakers", with Val using the ring name Henchman and Tony worked as Punisher. The duo started in International Championship Wrestling (ICW; later renamed International World Class Championship Wrestling or IWCCW). On December 11, 1989, the Undertakers defeated a team known as the S & S Express (Vic Steamboat and Joe Savoldi to win the ICW Tag Team Championship. Their run with the championship only lasted 17 days as the Dynamic Duo (Phil Apollo and Eric Sbraccia) defeated them on a show in Portland, Maine. In March 1990 the Undertakers won the championship again, this time renamed the IWCCW Tag Team Championship. Almost a year later, on February 20, 1991, the Undertakers lost the championship to a team known as The Billion Dollar Babies (Mike Sampson and G.Q. Stratus).

=== Japan (1991-1992) ===
After this the twins toured Japan, working for All Japan Pro Wrestling in February and March 1991. Their first match came on February 23, 1991, when they faced "The Land of Giants" duo of Butch Masters and Nitron. They also faced Mighty Inoue & Rusher Kimura, as well as Dean Malenko and Joe Malenko. In November 1992 they wrestled for Wrestle Association R losing the teams of Haku and The Berzerker; and Genichiro Tenryu and Takashi Ishikawa.

=== World Wrestling Federation (1991-1994) ===
At this point in time the team changed their name after the World Wrestling Federation bought the rights to their original name to ensure there would be no confusion between the team and the WWF wrestler Mark Calaway who worked as "the Undertaker". The team took the name "Double Trouble", making their first appearance on September 30, 1991, at a dark match in Wheeling, WV where they defeated a preliminary team at a Wrestling Challenge taping. They won another dark match against preliminary opposition in Huntington, WV at a WWF Superstars taping.

In June 1992 they began teaming regularly on WWF house shows. The tour was part of the settlement that they reached with the WWF over "The Undertaker" name. They were winless in house show encounters with The Bushwhackers. In August they entered a house show series against High Energy, and in September they received title matches against WWF Tag-Team Champions The Natural Disasters. After going winless, Double Trouble finally gained their first victory of the year on October 2, 1992, in Poughkeepsie, NY when they defeated Mark Thomas and Phil Apollo. They finished the year facing Road Warrior Animal in handicap matches.

In 1993 they wrestled only one match, losing to The Steiner Brothers on January 30 in Providence, RI. After a lengthy absence they returned on July 7, 1994, to face the tag-team champions The Headshrinkers in Landover, MD. Following two more matches against The Headshrinkers the duo left the promotion.

=== Century Wrestling Alliance (1993-1997) ===
During their hiatus from the WWF in 1993, the duo also worked in the CWA. On September 23, 1993, the duo defeated The Interns to become the first ever CWA Tag Team Champions for Century Wrestling Alliance. On March 25, 1994, the team of Vic Steamboat and Ray Odyssey defeated Double Trouble to end their title run. In 1994 the team worked as "the Trouble Makers" with Val being known as Chaos and Tony working as Mayhem. Their final match in the CWA came on December 12, 1994, when they defeated Alex Shane & Cherokee Renegade in Elizabethton, Tennessee.

In 1995, his brother Val worked in Extreme Championship Wrestling and they split up. Tony would go on his own working for Northeast Wrestling and Century Wrestling Alliance until his last match in 1997.

== Personal life ==
Tony made the announcement on Facebook that his brother, Val died on January 7, 2011, at 45. It was believed to be from obesity.
