= Eric Sbraccia =

American professional wrestler (born 1968)

Personal information
- Born: September 24, 1968 (age 57) Revere, Massachusetts, U.S.

Professional wrestling career
- Ring name(s): Erich Sbraccia; Eric Sbraccia
- Billed height: 6 ft 4 in (1.93 m)
- Billed weight: 277 lb (126 kg)
- Billed from: The Combat Zone; Boston, Massachusetts
- Debut: 1984
- Retired: 2002

Erich L. Sbraccia (born September 24, 1968), also known as Eric Sbraccia, is an American retired professional wrestler. He began his career in International Championship Wrestling at age 14 as a "junior member" for manager "Boston Bad Boy" Tony Rumble and debuted as a wrestler two years later. He emerged as one of the promotion's top heel performers during the late 1980s, while feuding with "Jumping" Joe Savoldi, and was part of The Dynamic Duo with "Fabulous" Phil Apollo. He is a former ICW Light Heavyweight Champion and two-time ICW Tag Team Champion with Apollo.

He was among the many ICW mainstays who jumped to Tony Rumble's Century Wrestling Alliance in the early-1990s. When the promotion joined the National Wrestling Alliance, Sbraccia became one of NWA New England's biggest stars. As a member of The Brotherhood, he was both the inaugural NWA New England Heavyweight Champion and NWA New England Tag Team Champion with Knuckles Nelson. In 1998, The Brotherhood won the NWA World Tag Team Championship at the NWA's 50th Anniversary Show. As world champions, they defended the belts not only in New England but throughout the U.S. and Japan. Sbraccia occasionally wrestled as a preliminary wrestler for the World Wrestling Federation during this period.

== Early life ==
Erich Sbraccia was born on September 24, 1968. A native of Revere, Massachusetts, he became involved in pro wrestling at an early age. In 1984, the 14-year-old Sbraccia became a "junior member" of Tony Rumble and his "heel" stable in the Savoldi family's International Championship Wrestling.

== Professional wrestling career ==
=== International Championship Wrestling (1984–1992) ===
Sbraccia was formerly made a full member of Tony Rumble's The Brotherhood upon making his ICW debut as a wrestler in 1984. He wrestled Brian Walsh in Waltham, Massachusetts, on his 16th birthday. He also faced such opponents as Kevin Sullivan and Mark Lewin during his early career. A talented junior heavyweight, Sbraccia defeated Robbie Ellis for the ICW Light Heavyweight Championship in Dover, New Hampshire, a year later. He dropped the title to Ellis in Augusta, Maine, on December 28, 1988.

In early-1989, Sbraccia began teaming with "Fabulous" Phil Apollo as The Dynamic Duo. The team's name was a tribute by Sbraccia and Apollo to WCCW Tag Team Champions's Gentleman Chris Adams and Gino Hernandez. A veteran World Class Championship Wrestling himself, Apollo often emulated Adams' ring style including using his superkick finisher. On March 5, 1989, The Dynamic Duo defeated Vic Steamboat and "Jumping" Joe Savoldi in Augusta for the ICW Tag Team Championship. They held the belts for four months until Steamboat and Savoldi won them back in Marlboro, Massachusetts, on July 1. Sbraccia and Apollo regained the tag team titles at the end of year by defeating The Undertakers (Henchman and Punisher), managed by Sbraccia's former mentor Tony Rumble, in Portland, Maine, on December 11, 1989. Two days later in Augusta, however, Apollo and Vic Steamboat (substituting for Sbraccia) lost the tag belts to Paul E. Dangerously's The Lethal Weapons (Dennis Condrey and Doug Gilbert).

Sbraccia and Apollo made one last attempt to regain the belts when the ICW Tag Team Championship was declared vacant in the spring of 1990. On March 31, they lost to The Undertakers in Charlton, Massachusetts, in a match to decide the new champions. The Dynamic Duo broke up shortly afterwards and Sbraccia formed a tag team with GQ Madison in an attempt to regain the titles from The Undertakers. On September 6, 1990, Sbraccia and GQ Madison fought The Undertakers to a double-disqualification in Newport, Vermont. They were defeated by The Undertakers later that month at the State University of New York at Delhi.

=== Century Wrestling Alliance (1996–1998) ===
Sbraccia was among the ICW mainstays who followed Tony Rumble when he started Century Wrestling Alliance. On April 27, 1996, at a TV taping for CWA Mass Madness, he defeated Tito Gonzalez at the Champs Arena in Salisbury Beach, Massachusetts. That same year, Sbraccia and Sonny C won the CWA Tag Team Championship. On July 19, 1996, Sbraccia and Sonny C successfully defended the tag titles against Joel Davis and Rocky Davis in front of a sold-out 1,850 crowd at Revere High School. On October 18, 1997, Sbraccia defeated Trooper Gilmore at the sold-out South Lawrence East School in Lawrence, Massachusetts. That same night, he and Knuckles Nelson beat The Extremists (Ace Darling and Devon Storm) for the CWA Tag Team Championship.

=== NWA New England (1998) ===
In January 1998, the Century Wrestling Alliance became the official National Wrestling Alliance affiliate for the entire New England region. By this time, Sbraccia had aligned himself with Tony Rumble's "new" version of The Brotherhood which also included Knuckles Nelson, Tre, Tombstone, and manager Vinnie Capelli. On January 17, he became the first NWA New England Heavyweight Champion after defeating Vic Steamboat in a tournament final in Southbridge, Massachusetts. He retained his title against Tom Brandi, via disqualification, at a house show in Ogdensburg, New York, on April 25. On May 9, at the "NWA New England Inaugural Event", Sbraccia wrestled Maverick Wild in a non-title match at the Good Times Emporium in Somerville, Massachusetts.

In the next few weeks, Sbraccia defended the title against Mike and Ralph Lano, Beau Douglas, and Curtis Slamdawg. One of his bouts with Mike Lano took place at Eddie Andelman's "Hot Dog Safari". He also occasionally wrestled as a preliminary wrestler for the World Wrestling Federation. On the July 25 edition of WWF Shotgun Saturday Night, Sbraccia and Devon Storm wrestled The New Midnight Express (Bombastic Bob and Bodacious Bart) in Binghamton, New York. Two months later, Sbraccia lost to Kurrgan (with The Oddities) at the Tsongas Arena in Lowell, Massachusetts. On September 19, 1998, Sbraccia defeated The Mercenary at Taste of the Boss in Boston, Massachusetts. Later that night in Everett, he finally lost the NWA New England title to Barry Windham ending his 9-month championship reign.

=== National Wrestling Alliance (1998–1999) ===
Despite losing the heavyweight title, The Brotherhood still held the NWA New England Tag Team Championship. On the same night he lost the heavyweight title, Sbraccia and Nelson defeated both Slyck Wagner Brown & Steve Morabito and The New York Posse (Curtis Slamdawg & Jay Kobain). They also successfully defended their titles against Bob Evans & Rocky Shore and The New York Posse in Melrose, Massachusetts, on October 17, 1998.

On October 24, the team represented the promotion at the NWA 50th Anniversary Show in Cherry Hill, New Jersey. It was at this event that The Brotherhood defeated The Border Patrol (Agent Carson and Agent Gunn), Team Extreme (Kit Carson and Khris Germany), and Tully Blanchard & Tom Prichard in a Four Corners match to win the NWA World Tag Team Championship. Barry Windham, who had beaten Sbraccia for the NWA New England title the previous month, was originally booked to be Blanchard's partner but was replaced by Prichard at the last moment.

Their victory was considered a high point in the history of NWA England and brought national exposure to the company. The promotion also received attention from wrestling magazine publishers Bill Apter and George Napolitano. The NWA had initially intended the tag title to be traded among its various NWA affiliates shortly after the 50th Anniversary Show, however, Rumble and Sheldon Goldberg took the initiative and began booking title defenses for The Brotherhood on their own. Goldberg was able to contact Wally Yamaguchi, though his brother Shun, and arranged for The Brotherhood to tour Japan as the NWA Tag Team Champions. It was the first time the NWA had toured the country in several years. On January 30, 1999, at a live event for Worldwide Pro Wrestling, The Brotherhood took part in a battle royal at the Kitakyushu Municipal Ogura Northern Gym in Fukuoka, Japan. Sbraccia and Nelson were the final participants along with fellow "gaijin" wrestler The Hater of Pro Wrestling America. Instead of turning on each other, The Brotherhood tossed The Hater out of the ring and were declared co-winners of the battle royal. On another tour six months later, The Brotherhood feuded with The Caffeine Connection (Cola Kid and Pepsi Boy) over the NWA World Tag Team Championship. The Brotherhood appeared to have lost the belts on the tour, during an impromptu match with The Caffeine Connection, which saw interference from both Kinjiro Oki and "Wild" Bill Irwin, however the officials reversed the decision.

On February 26, The Brotherhood were scheduled to defend the belts against Team Extreme at an NWA Southwest show in North Richland Hills, Texas, but were unable to appear due to heavy snow. In addition to the team missing a mandatory title defense, NWA officials were becoming displeased with the promotion holding on to the world tag title for so long. The title was declared held-up on March 3 and the NWA Board of Directors threatened to strip The Brotherhood of the championship if they failed to appear at the next NWA Southwest show at the Bronco Bowl Arena in Dallas that summer. NWA New England would also be fined $5,000 if they did not comply. Sbraccia, especially coming off an international tour to Japan, was concerned that another extended trip to Texas might result in being released from his regular job.

That spring, Sbraccia and Nelson continued to defend the world titles in matches against Devon Storm & Julio Sanchez, The Public Enemy (Rocco Rock and Johnny Grunge), The New York Posse (Ron Zombie and Jay Kobain), and Beau Douglas & Rex Lethal. On April 22, The Brotherhood and Dukes Dalton beat Punisher, Tony Montana, and Mike Johnson in a 6-man tag team match at Somerville's Good Times Emporium. Sbraccia also appeared on the April 27 edition of WWF Shotgun Saturday Night where he faced Mideon at the New Haven Coliseum.

On June 10, 1999, Rick Fuller was brought in to replace Sbraccia at the Dallas show to battle Team Extreme for the vacant tag team championship. The Brotherhood managed to win back the belts via reverse decision. Meanwhile, Sbraccia had undergone knee surgery and was subsequently replaced by Dukes Dalton in The Brotherhood's NWA tag team title defenses. Nelson and Dalton won the NWA briefly lost the belts to The Public Enemy in Bolton, Massachusetts, but regained them in Dorchester two days later. They eventually dropped the titles to Team Extreme at the NWA's 51st Anniversary Show in Charlotte, North Carolina, that fall.

=== Independent circuit and retirement (2000–2002) ===
Sbraccia eventually returned to action and made a few appearances for Knuckles Nelson's Wrestling Star Wars promotion, most notably, wrestling Tiger Mulligan in Salisbury Beach, Massachusetts, on July 14, 2001. Sbraccia briefly returned to NWA New England, along with fellow Brotherhood member Tre, in February 2002. On February 16, 2002, at the "Broken Hearts & Broken Bones" benefit show, Sbraccia defeated Rick Fuller for the NWA New England Brass Knuckles Championship in Malden, Massachusetts. His comeback was cut short, however, when he left the promotion that summer and subsequently retired. In 2015, Sbraccia was inducted into the New England Pro Wrestling Hall of Fame.

== Championships and accomplishments ==
- Century Wrestling Alliance
  - CWA Tag Team Championship (1 time) – with Sonny C
- International Championship Wrestling
  - ICW Light Heavyweight Championship (1 time)
  - ICW Tag Team Championship (2 times) – with Phil Apollo
- National Wrestling Alliance
  - NWA World Tag Team Championship (1 time) – with Knuckles Nelson
- NWA New England
  - NWA New England Heavyweight Championship (1 time)
  - NWA New England Brass Knuckles Championship (1 time)
  - NWA New England Tag Team Championship (1 time) – with Knuckles Nelson
- New England Pro Wrestling Hall of Fame
  - Class of 2015
- Pro Wrestling Illustrated
  - PWI ranked Eric Sbraccia # 262 of the 500 best singles wrestlers of the PWI 500 in 1999
