= Curly Moe =

Canadian-American professional wrestler (1962 – 2015)

Personal information
- Born: Donald Chester Zalesky; April 3, 1962 Chicoutimi, Quebec, Canada
- Died: July 1, 2015 (aged 53) Belleville, New Jersey, U.S.

Professional wrestling career
- Ring name(s): Curly Moe; Diesel Don
- Billed height: 6 ft 0 in (1.83 m)
- Billed weight: 394 lb (179 kg)
- Trained by: Johnny Rodz
- Debut: 1990
- Retired: 1994

Donald Chester Zalesky (April 3, 1962 – July 1, 2015), better known by his ring name Curly Moe, was a Canadian-American professional wrestler best known for his time in International World Class Championship Wrestling. He was a popular "babyface" in the promotion during the early 1990s, whose gimmick was based on the character Curly Howard from the comedy team The Three Stooges. Bill Apter's 1Wrestling.com has called Curly Moe one of the "silliest characters" in pro wrestling history.

== Professional wrestling career ==
Zalesky trained under Johnny Rodz at "The World's Famous" Gleason's Gym in Brooklyn. Initially wrestling under the name Diesel, Zalesky's trainer changed his ring name several times, including Curly Man Don, before settling on Diesel Don in late 1989. An agile "big man", Zalesky could perform dropkicks and a double leg enzuigiri despite weighing over 500 lbs. He trained with fellow students such as Big Sweet William, Kid Krush, and Mondo Kleen while at the facility. He was also the first-ever opponent of Tommy Dreamer, a future Extreme Championship Wrestling star, who debuted on October 28, 1989.

The derby-wearing behemoth would "Hulk Up" in much the same way Curly did in several of the short films and then unleash his power onto his victim. The Southern oddity didn't have an extended career but he was fun to watch while he Nyuk Nyuk'd his way around the ring.

— Jay Shannon, 1Wrestling.com (April 1, 2010)

Zalesky made his pro wrestling debut the following year in International World Class Championship Wrestling. He was brought in by the Savoldi family as a "family friendly" character younger wrestling fans could relate to. His "gimmick" or in-ring persona was based on Curly Howard of The Three Stooges. He not only bore a strong resemblance to Howard but skillfully mimicked his mannerisms both in and outside the ring. His finisher was called the Soitenly Splash and celebrated victories by performing the Curly Shuffle in the center of the ring.

The promotion went so far as to claim he was the real-life nephew of Curly and Moe Howard attracting some attention from the media. Zalesky was largely used as a comedy act, who antagonized "Boston Bad Boy" Tony Rumble and other IWCCW "heels" with his zany antics, rather than as a serious competitor. In 1991, Zalesky was ranked #445 of the 500 best singles wrestlers in the country by Pro Wrestling Illustrated; he was also interviewed by PWI senior editor Bill Apter on PWI Conference.

== Post-retirement ==
Weighing in at around 600 lbs. during his career, Zalesky retired due to health problems shortly after IWCCW folded. Following his retirement, Zalesky began teaching ESL (English as a Second Language) to adults in Newark, New Jersey; however, his weight continued to increase over the years. In 2005, his weight reached around 730 lbs. and Zalesky underwent a gastric bypass surgery, resulting in a significant weight loss of 340 lbs. In December 2006, after false reports of his death had circulated the internet, Zalesky issued a public statement to editor Bill Apter regarding his life following his retirement and appeared on 1Wrestling.com. The previous month, he had apparently left a message on the online forums of KayfabeMemories.com to dispel the internet rumors. (Note: "Curly Moe is alive and well. I know because I am Curly. I check the net once in a while. I never wrestled as Gustav the Giant. I trained with Tazz - Pete a great guy. & Tommy Dreamer - His mom made me gym pants one time. Nice people. I am 44 years old and I am living in Northern NJ, in the Newark area where I teach English in the Portuguese and Brazilian community known as the Iron Bound. I have been married for 8 years. So please tell people Curly is alive and well.") 1Wrestling.com later included Zalesky's "Curly Moe" gimmick as one of the "silliest characters in wrestling" for a special April Fools' Day column in 2010.

Zalesky died to liver cancer on July 1, 2015.

== Championships and accomplishments ==
- Pro Wrestling Illustrated
  - PWI ranked Curly Moe # 445 of the 500 best singles wrestlers of the PWI 500 in 1991
