= IWCCW Heavyweight Championship =

Professional wrestling championship

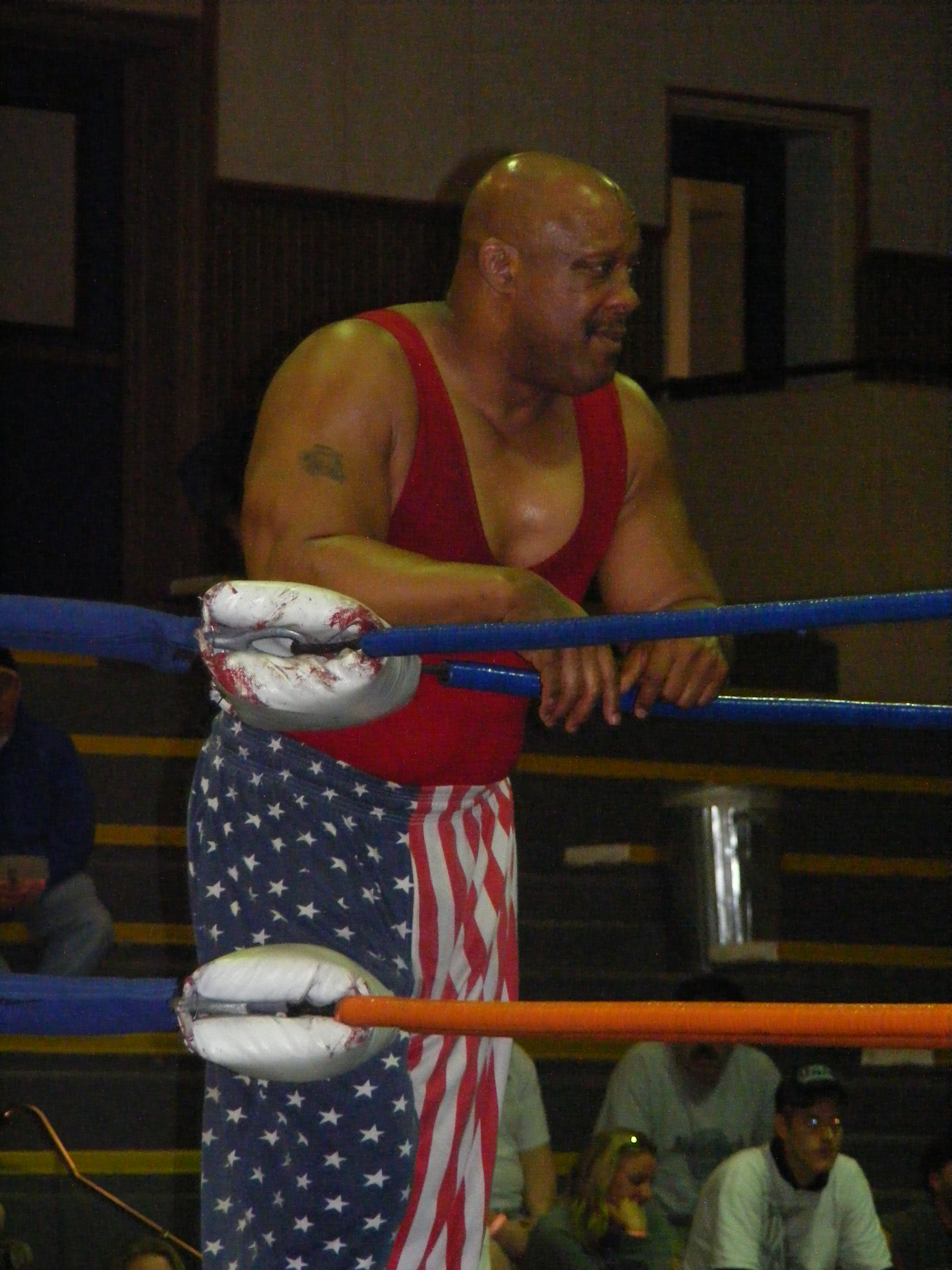
- Tony Atlas the longest reigning IWCCW Heavyweight Champion.

Details
- Promotion: International Championship Wrestling (1985–January 1991); International World Class Championship Wrestling (January 1991–1995)
- Date established: 1985
- Date retired: 1995

Other name(s)
- ICW Heavyweight Championship
Statistics
- First champion(s): Carlos Colón
- Most reigns: Joe Savoldi (4 reigns)
- Longest reign: Tony Atlas (528 days)
- Shortest reign: Dory Funk Jr. (80 days) (Note: Due to some records being incomplete it is possible someone else held the championship for a shorter period of time.)
- Oldest champion: "Lord" Jonathan Boyd (44 years, 52 days)
- Youngest champion: Vic Steamboat (30 years, 97 days)
- Heaviest champion: Moondog Spike (345 lb (156 kg))
- Lightest champion: Joe Savoldi (220 lb (100 kg))

The ICW / IWCCW Heavyweight Championship was the top singles championship of International World Class Championship Wrestling between 1984 and 1995 where IWCCW closed down operations. Initially ICW’s main title was the WWC Universal Heavyweight Championship, through a talent exchange program and a close working relationship between ICW and WWC the Universal Title was promoted in the New England area as the main ICW title without ever mentioning the WWC name, nor was it presented as a title owned by ICW. When the arrangement came to an end in 1985 a specific “ICW Heavyweight Championship” was created with the lineage of the WWC Universal title during the time of the working relationship. In 1993 the then champion Tony Atlas along with a number of IWCCW wrestlers left the company leaving the title vacant and only used sporadically between 1993 and 1995 where the promotion closed. Because the championship is a professional wrestling championship, it is not won or lost competitively but instead by the decision of the bookers of a wrestling promotion. The championship is awarded after the chosen team "wins" a match to maintain the illusion that professional wrestling is a competitive sport.

== Title history ==
Key
No.	Overall reign number
Reign	Reign number for the specific champion
Days	Number of days held

No.	Champion	Championship change			Reign statistics		Notes	Ref.
No.	Champion	Date	Event	Location	Reign	Days	Notes	Ref.
1	Carlos Colón	December 8, 1984	N/A	N/A	1	(Note: The exact date ICW recognizes Colon as the champion is not documented which means the championship reign lasted anywhere between −308 and 57 days)	Carlos Colón was the WWC Universal Heavyweight Champion when ICW was founded and recognized as the first champion to represent ICW.	
2	Dory Funk Jr.	February 27, 1985	ICW show	Bangor, Maine	1	80	This marked the first time that the WWC Universal Heavyweight Championship changed hands outside of Puerto Rico.	
—	Vacated	May 18, 1985	—	—	—	—	Held up after a match against Carlos Colón. This marked the end of the ICW/WWC joint title lineage.	
3	Joe Savoldi	April 1, 1986 (NLT)	ICW show	(Note: The location of the match was not captured as part of the championship documentation.)	1	(Note: The exact date Savoldi won and lost the championship is not documented which means the championship reign lasted anywhere between 1 and 682 days)	Joe Savoldi was the first champion to be recognized as the "ICW Heavyweight Champion".	
4	Phil Apollo	February 10, 1987 (NLT)	ICW show		1	(Note: The exact date Apollo won the championship is not documented which means the championship reign lasted anywhere between 1 and 651 days)		
—	Vacated	October 1, 1987 (NLT)	—	—	—	—	Championship was vacated when Phil Apollo left the promotion.	
5	Joe Savoldi	October 1, 1987	ICW show		2	(Note: The exact date Savoldi lost the championship is not documented which means the championship reign lasted anywhere between 92 and 452 days)	Joe Savoldi won a battle royal to claim the vacant championship.	
6	Moondog Spike	August 15, 1988 (NLT)	ICW show		1	(Note: The exact date Moondog Spike won and lost the championshio is not documented which means the championship reign lasted anywhere between 1 and 359 days)		
7	Joe Savoldi	August 25, 1988 (NLT)	ICW show		3	(Note: The exact date Savlodi won the championshio is not documented which means the championship reign lasted anywhere between 1 and 361 days)		
8	"Lord" Jonathan Boyd	December 28, 1988	ICW show		1	(Note: The exact date Boyd lost the championshiphas not been documented which means the championship reign lasted anywhere between −362 and −332 days)		
9	Joe Savoldi	January 1989	ICW show	Presque Isle, Maine	4	(Note: The exact date Savoldi won the championship is not documented which means the championship reign lasted anywhere between 11 and 41 days)		
10	Tony Atlas	February 11, 1989	ICW show	Presque Isle, Maine	1	528		
11	Vic Steamboat	July 24, 1990	ICW show	Middletown, Delaware County, New York	1	269		
12	Tony Atlas	April 19, 1991	IWCCW show	South China, Maine	2	(Note: The exact date Tony Atlas left IWCCW has not been documented which means the championship reign lasted anywhere between 1 and 682 days)		
—	Vacated	March 1, 1993 (NLT)	—	—	—	—	Championship was vacated when Tony Atlas left ICW.	
13	Tito Santana	February 9, 1994	IWCCW show	Yardville, New Jersey	1	387	Defeated Greg Valentine to win the vacant championship.	
14	Greg Valentine	March 3, 1995	IWCCW show	Orwigsburg, Pennsylvania	1	91		
15	Koko B. Ware	June 2, 1995	IWCCW show	Chattanooga, Tennessee	1	(Note: The exact date IWCCW stopped promoting not documented which means the championship reign lasted anywhere between 1 and 212 days)	Was awarded the championship when Greg Valentine did not show for a scheduled title defense.	
—	Deactivated	1995	—	—	—	—	IWCCW Closed	
