= Tony Rumble =

American professional wrestler (1956–1999)

Personal information
- Born: Anthony David Magliaro; November 6, 1956 Boston, Massachusetts, United States
- Died: November 13, 1999 (aged 43) Natick, Massachusetts, United States
- Cause of death: Heart attack

Professional wrestling career
- Ring name(s): Boston Bad Boy Tony Rumble; Tony Rummell; The Dungeon Master
- Billed height: 6 ft 4 in (1.93 m)
- Billed weight: 245 lb (111 kg)
- Billed from: Combat Zone, Boston
- Debut: 1984

Anthony David Magliaro (November 6, 1956 – November 13, 1999) was an American professional wrestler and manager, known by the ring name Boston Bad Boy Tony Rumble. He competed on the Northeast and Mid-Atlantic independent circuit during the 1980s and 90s. A longtime veteran of Angelo Savoldi's International World Class Championship Wrestling, he also was the owner of the New England–based Century Wrestling Alliance and an independent wrestling promoter until his death in 1999.

== Early life ==
Anthony David Magliaro was born in Boston, Massachusetts on November 6, 1956. Growing up, he would sneak into the Boston Garden as a kid to see the WWWF whenever they came to town.

== Professional wrestling career ==
=== International World Class Championship Wrestling ===
Magliaro competed for then-International Championship Wrestling (ICW) in 1984. As "Tony Rummell", he faced Abdullah the Butcher and Bruiser Brody during his rookie year as well as former WWF wrestlers the Tonga Kid and Superstar Billy Graham during his singles career. In 1986, he briefly teamed with Rocky Raymond as The Boston Bad Boys who together faced The Midnight Rockers in an interpromotional match with the American Wrestling Association before feuding with "Mr. USA" Tony Atlas as the masked "Dungeon Master" the following year.

In 1988, Magliaro began working as a booker, as well as producer for the weekly ICW, which later became International World Class Championship Wrestling (IWCCW), television show. He later hosted the "Rumble Seat" segment whose guests included former WWF wrestlers The Honky Tonk Man and "Ravishing" Rick Rude as well as international stars such as Dory Funk, Jr., Ivan Putski and Mr. Pogo. During the late 1980s, he would also become a successful manager to wrestlers such as former rival and IWCCW Heavyweight Champion "Mr. USA" Tony Atlas, IWCCW Light Heavyweight Champion The Tasmaniac and the IWCCW Tag Team Champions The Undertakers (The Henchman and The Punisher).

=== Century Wrestling Alliance ===
Although establishing Century Wrestling Alliance (CWA) in 1989, Magliaro remained in IWCCW until its decline during the early 1990s until leaving to concentrate on his own promotion in early 1993. Using many of his contacts such as Kevin Sullivan, he was able to bring in former WWF and WCW wrestlers such as Jimmy Snuka, The Iron Sheik, Harley Race, Al Snow, Hugh Morrus, Public Enemy, Scott Taylor and A-Train, as well as many longtime IWCCW veterans including Atlas, The Tasmaniac, Tommy Dreamer, "Mr. Intensity" Erich Sbraccia, Vic Steamboat, "Surfer" Ray Odyssey, The Pink Assassin and The Trouble Makers (formerly The Undertakers) who followed Magliaro to the newly formed promotion.

Magliaro won the CWA's heavyweight title three times before being stripped of the title by CWA President Victoria Van Ellen. The CWA later become a territory of the National Wrestling Alliance (NWA). Magilaro continued to act as promoter for the territory, which was renamed NWA New England.

=== Later years ===
In late 1993 and early 1994 he was a commentator for Extreme Championship Wrestling's ECW Hardcore TV.

As Tony Rumble, Magliaro appeared at WCW's World War 3 pay-per-view event in 1996 as an entrant in the 60-man, three-ring battle royal, which he was not successful in winning.

Representing NWA New England, Magliaro appeared with The Brotherhood (Erich Sbraccia and Knuckles Nelson) who would win the NWA World Tag Team Championship in a four way elimination match against Tully Blanchard and Tom Prichard, then champions The Border Patrol (Agent Gunn and Agent Maxx), and Team Extreme (Kit Carson and Khris Germany) during the NWA's 50th Anniversary Show in October 1998.

Magliaro continued running NWA New England until his death following a heart attack on November 13, 1999. Following Magliaro's death, his wife Victoria Van Ellen Magliaro Rumble took over ownership of the promotion which later became NWA Cold Front and eventually Victory Championship Wrestling. Jason Della Gatta, who both runs live events and competes in the promotion as "Jason Rumble", is the kayfabe (storyline) son of Magliaro's in-ring persona.

VCW runs an annual "Tony Rumble Memorial" show. The Millennium Wrestling Federation has also featured an annual Tony Rumble Memorial Battle Royal with Todd Hanson, Bull Montana, Ox Baker and Rick Fuller winning the most recent held on August 4, 2007. Rumble is frequently mentioned during VCW's Livewire television program.

== Championships and accomplishments ==
- Century Wrestling Alliance
  - CWA New England Heavyweight Championship (3 times)
- International Championship Wrestling (New England)
  - ICW Tag Team Championship (1 time) – with Moondog Spike
- New England Pro Wrestling Hall of Fame
  - Class of 2008
- Pro Wrestling Illustrated
  - PWI ranked him No. 257 of the 500 best singles wrestlers of the PWI 500 in 1994
- Victory Championship Wrestling
  - VCW Hall of Fame (Class of 2018)

== See also ==
- List of premature professional wrestling deaths
