= CWA New England Heavyweight Championship =

Professional wrestling championship

Details
- Promotion: Century Wrestling Alliance
- Date established: April 1, 1993
- Date retired: January 24, 1998
Statistics
- First champion(s): Tony Rumble
- Final champion(s): Tony Rumble
- Most reigns: Tony Rumble (3 reigns)

The CWA New England Heavyweight Championship was a secondary wrestling title in the Century Wrestling Alliance. It was one of two secondary titles in use during the promotion's early years, the other being the CWA Television Championship, and dominated by Tony Rumble for much of its history. Rumble defeated Stanley Raymond in a tournament final held in Boston, Massachusetts on April 1, 1993, to become the first champion and went on to win the title a record three times. He was eventually stripped of the title by CWA President Victoria Van Ellen on January 24, 1998, when the CWA joined the National Wrestling Alliance, and was joined with the CWA Heavyweight Championship to create the NWA New England Heavyweight Championship. The title returned to its original name when the CWA withdrew from the NWA on March 10, 2007.

== Title history ==
Silver areas in the history indicate periods of unknown lineage.

Wrestler:	Times:	Date:	Location:	Notes:
Tony Rumble	1	April 1, 1993	Boston, Massachusetts	Defeated Stanley Raymond in tournament final to become the first recognized champion.
New Hampshire Nightmare	1	June 13, 1993	Gosstown, Massachusetts	
Tony Rumble	2	March 13, 1994	Melrose, Massachusetts	
Big Val	1	October 31, 1995	Gloucester, Massachusetts	
Tony Rumble	3	July 15, 1996	Revere, Massachusetts	
Rumble is stripped of the title by CWA President Victoria Van Ellen on January 24, 1998, after the CWA joins the National Wrestling Alliance. The New England Championship is then merged with the main heavyweight title to create the NWA New England Heavyweight Championship.
