= Val Puccio =

American professional wrestler (1965–2011)

Personal information
- Born: Valentino Puccio; June 9, 1965 Bronx, New York, U.S.
- Died: January 7, 2011 (aged 45) Bronx, New York, U.S.

Professional wrestling career
- Ring name(s): Big Malley; Big Val Puccio; Henchman; Double Trouble #2; Chaos
- Billed height: 5 ft 11 in (1.80 m)
- Billed weight: 475 lb (215 kg) to 530 lb (240 kg)
- Trained by: Johnny Rodz
- Debut: 1989
- Retired: 1999

Valentino Puccio (June 9, 1965 – January 7, 2011) was a professional wrestler best known under the ring names Val Puccio and Henchman and teaming with his brother Tony Pucci as "The Undertakers" and later as "Double Trouble".

== Professional wrestling career ==
Trained by Johnny Rodz, Puccio began his wrestling career in 1989 and worked for various northeast U.S. independent promotions for most of his career.

=== International World Class Championship Wrestling (1989 - 1991) ===
Teaming with his brother Tony the duo formed a tag team called "The Undertakers", with Val using the ring name Henchman and Tony worked as Punisher. The duo started in International Championship Wrestling (ICW; later renamed International World Class Championship Wrestling or IWCCW). On December 11, 1989, the Undertakers defeated a team known as the S & S Express (Vic Steamboat and Joe Savoldi to win the ICW Tag Team Championship. Their run with the championship only lasted 17 days as the Dynamic Duo (Phil Apollo and Eric Sbraccia) defeated them on a show in Portland, Maine. In March 1990 the Undertakers won the championship again, this time renamed the IWCCW Tag Team Championship. Almost a year later, on February 20, 1991, the Undertakers lost the championship to a team known as The Billion Dollar Babies (Mike Sampson and G.Q. Stratus).

=== Japan (1991-1992) ===
After this the twins toured Japan, working for All Japan Pro Wrestling in February and March 1991. Their first match came on February 23, 1991, when they faced "The Land of Giants" duo of Butch Masters and Nitron. They also faced Mighty Inoue & Rusher Kimura, as well as Dean Malenko and Joe Malenko. In November 1992 they wrestled for Wrestle Association R losing the teams of Haku and The Berzerker; and Genichiro Tenryu and Takashi Ishikawa.

=== World Wrestling Federation (1991-1994) ===
At this point in time the team changed their name after the World Wrestling Federation bought the rights to their original name to ensure there would be no confusion between the team and the WWF wrestler Mark Calaway who worked as "the Undertaker". The team took the name "Double Trouble", making their first appearance on September 30, 1991, at a dark match in Wheeling, WV where they defeated a preliminary team at a Wrestling Challenge taping. They won another dark match against preliminary opposition in Huntington, WV at a WWF Superstars taping.

In June 1992 they began teaming regularly on WWF house shows. The tour was part of the settlement that they reached with the WWF over "The Undertaker" name. They were winless in house show encounters with The Bushwhackers. In August they entered a house show series against High Energy, and in September they received title matches against WWF Tag-Team Champions The Natural Disasters. After going winless, Double Trouble finally gained their first victory of the year on October 2, 1992, in Poughkeepsie, NY when they defeated Mark Thomas and Phil Apollo. They finished the year facing Road Warrior Animal in handicap matches.

In 1993 they wrestled only one match, losing to The Steiner Brothers on January 30 in Providence, RI. After a lengthy absence they returned on July 7, 1994, to face the tag-team champions The Headshrinkers in Landover, MD. Following two more matches against The Headshrinkers the duo left the promotion.

=== Century Wrestling Alliance (1993-1994) ===
During their hiatus from the WWF in 1993, the duo also worked in the CWA. On September 23, 1993, the duo defeated The Interns to become the first ever CWA Tag Team Champions for Century Wrestling Alliance. On March 25, 1994, the team of Vic Steamboat and Ray Odyssey defeated Double Trouble to end their title run. In 1994 the team worked as "the Trouble Makers" with Val being known as Chaos and Tony working as Mayhem. Their final match in the CWA came on December 12, 1994, when they defeated Alex Shane & Cherokee Renegade in Elizabethton, Tennessee.

=== Extreme Championship Wrestling (1995) ===
In 1995 Val worked for Extreme Championship Wrestling (ECW), known as Big Val. His run was short lived, losing matches to Mikey Whipwreck and Hack Meyers. Puccio's only ECW victory was a win over Tony Stetson by disqualification. He was one of the founding members of a tag team with JT Smith, which would later evolve into The Full Blooded Italians group.

=== Century Wrestling Alliance (1996) ===
After his ECW Run Val briefly held the CWA New England Heavyweight Championship, winning it from and losing it back to Tony Rumble.

=== NWA New England (1999) ===
Val Puccio joined NWA New England, wrestling under the moniker of "Punisher" losing to The Mercenary on May 28 in Somerville, Massachusetts. He also faced Iron Fist while in the promotion.

== Personal life ==
Puccio's battles against obesity have been chronicled on the TLC series Inside the Brookhaven Obesity Clinic, where he was a patient. Puccio died on January 7, 2011. His brother Tony made the announcement on Facebook. He was 45. His death is thought to have been caused by his obesity.

== Championships and accomplishments ==
- Century Wrestling Alliance
  - CWA New England Heavyweight Championship (1 time)
  - CWA Tag Team Championship (1 time, first) – With Tony Puccio
- International Championship Wrestling / International World Class Championship Wrestling
  - IWCCW Tag Team Championship (2 times) - with Punisher

== See also ==
- List of premature professional wrestling deaths
