= Dynamic Duo (professional wrestling) =

Professional wrestling tag team

Tag team
- Members: Al Snow; Unabomb
- Name: Dynamic Duo
- Billed heights: Al Snow: 6 ft 0 in (1.83 m); Unabomb: 6 ft 7 in (2.02 m)
- Combined billed weight: 560 lb (250 kg)
- Debut: February 6, 1995
- Disbanded: August 12, 1995

The Dynamic Duo was a professional wrestling tag team who wrestled in Smoky Mountain Wrestling from early to mid 1995. The team consisted of Al Snow and Unabomb. This was the fifth version of the Dynamic Duo, following the original team of Gino Hernandez and Tully Blanchard, followed by Hernandez and Chris Adams, Al Madril and Brian Adias, and Eric Sbraccia and Phil Apollo.

== History ==
Al Snow and Unabomb both wrestled for Jim Cornette's Knoxville, Tennessee-based Smoky Mountain Wrestling in 1995 before they formed a tag team in SMW on the February 6, 1995 TV taping of SMW, which was dubbed The Dynamic Duo. They defeated Anthony Michaels and The Wolfman. The same night, they earned a shot at the SMW Tag Team Champions Rock N' Roll Express (Robert Gibson and Ricky Morton). The champions retained their titles after getting disqualified and this started a feud between Dynamic Duo and Rock N' Roll Express.

Al Snow and Unabomb received several shots at Gibson and Morton for the titles but usually got pinned or disqualified. Finally, Al Snow and Unabomb defeated Rock N' Roll Express for the SMW Tag Team Championship in a "coal miner's glove match". Al Snow and Unabomb had short-lived feuds with tag teams such as The Batten Twins (Bart & Brad), The Dirty White Boy and Tracy Smothers, Armstrong Brothers (Steve and Scott) and Robert Gibson & Boo Bradley.

Al Snow and Unabomb started to feud with Rock N' Roll Express again with this time, Snow and Unabomb as the champions. Snow and Unabomb had a series of title defenses against Rock N' Roll Express and they usually retained their titles after getting disqualified. Finally the dynamic reign of Dynamic Duo ended when they were defeated by The Thugs (Dirty White Boy and Tracy Smothers). They would still feud with Rock N' Roll Express and the two had a series of matches with Rock N' Roll Express winning. The two teams would also wrestle in a "thunder cage match" and a "street fight match". After the street fight match, Dynamic Duo ended their long-time feud with Rock N' Roll Express.

Dynamic Duo would now focus on the SMW Tag Team Championship and they started to feud with the then-champions Thugs who defeated them for the titles earlier in the month. Dynamic Duo challenged the Thugs twice for the titles but were unsuccessful in regaining the titles. Thugs dropped the titles but Dynamic Duo would still feud with them so they could take their revenge but would eventually lose to Thugs. Dynamic Duo earned a final shot at the SMW Tag Team Championship in a four corners elimination tag team match which involved themselves, the reigning champions Heavenly Bodies, The Thugs and The Headbangers (Mosh and Thrasher), but failed to win the titles. Their rivalry with Thugs ended when they lost a "loser-of-the-fall leaves town match" to Thugs. As a result of losing the fall, Unabomb was forced to leave SMW. He joined the World Wrestling Federation as Isaac Yankem, DDS, while Snow stayed for another month, until leaving for the WWF, after losing a televised match to Brad Armstrong.

== Championships and accomplishments ==
- Smoky Mountain Wrestling
  - SMW Tag Team Championship (1 time)
