= CWA Heavyweight Championship (New England) =

The CWA Heavyweight Championship is the primary professional wrestling singles title in the Century Wrestling Alliance. The title was first won by Tommy Dreamer who defeated "Mr. USA" Tony Atlas in a tournament final held in Wallingford, Connecticut on November 5, 1992, and defended throughout New England by former World Championship Wrestling and World Wrestling Federation wrestlers as well as some of the top independent wrestlers in the Northeastern United States. The title was combined with the CWA New England title to create the NWA New England Heavyweight Championship when the CWA joined the National Wrestling Alliance and became NWA New England in January 1998. The title returned to its original name when the CWA withdrew from the NWA on March 10, 2007.

== Title history ==
Silver areas in the history indicate periods of unknown lineage.

Wrestler:	Times:	Date:	Location:	Notes:
CWA Heavyweight Championship
Tommy Dreamer	1	November 5, 1992	Wallingford, Connecticut	Defeated Tony Atlas in tournament final to become the first recognized champion.
The Iron Sheik	1	March 21, 1993	Burlington, Vermont	
Vic Steamboat	1	October 23, 1993	Wakefield, Massachusetts	
"Mr. USA" Tony Atlas	1	December 4, 1993	Bar Harbor, Maine	
Vic Steamboat	2	September 19, 1995	Pawtucket, Rhode Island	
Kevin Sullivan	1	October 31, 1995	Gloucester, Massachusetts	
Kevin Sullivan is stripped of the title after losing a "Loser-Must-Retire" match against Chris Benoit on July 14, 1997. The title remains vacant until the CWA joins the National Wrestling Alliance, upon which it is merged with the CWA New England title to create the NWA New England Heavyweight Championship.
Renamed NWA New England Heavyweight Championship
Erich Sbraccia	1	January 17, 1998	Southbridge, Massachusetts	Defeated Vic Steamboat in tournament final to become the first NWA New England champion.
Barry Windham	1	September 20, 1998	Everett, Massachusetts	
Curtis Slamdawg	1	October 10, 1998	Millinocket, Maine	
Trooper Gilmore	1	February 12, 1999	Mansfield, Massachusetts	
Knuckles Nelson	1	February 18, 1999	Mansfield, Massachusetts	
Curtis Slamdawg	2	January 16, 2000	Wethersfield, Connecticut	Defeated Jason Rage and Slick Wagner Brown in a Triangle match.
Title is vacated in June 2000.
Whacko	1	June 22, 2000	Somerville, Massachusetts	Defeated Brian Day, Jay Kobain, and Wagner Brown in a four corners match.
Title is declared vacant on August 24, 2000, when Wacko is stripped of the championship for failing to defend the title within a 30-day period.
"Boston Bad Boy" Jason Rumble	1	October 15, 2000	Nashville, Tennessee	Defeated Beau Douglas at the 52nd NWA Anniversary show to win the vacant title.
"Strangler" Steve King	1	May 6, 2001	Melrose, Massachusetts	Defeated "Boston Bad Boy" Jason Rumble via submission on NWA-NE Spotlite.
Jason Rumble	2	May 20, 2001	Melrose, Massachusetts	Defeated "Strangler" Steve King via submission on NWA-NE Spotlite.
Beau Douglas	1	October 27, 2001	Woburn, Massachusetts	
Rick Fuller	1	July 13, 2002	Woonsocket, Rhode Island	
Title is vacated in March 2003 after Rick Fuller failed to defend the title.
The Outpatient	1	April 6, 2003	Riverside, Rhode Island	Defeated "Diehard" Eddy Edwards at Riverside Middle School to win vacant title.
Title vacant in early 2003 and its history unrecorded until June 2004.
Apocalypse	1	June 19, 2004	Sanford, Maine	Defeated Brian Buffet to become the new NWA New England Heavyweight Champion.
Gino Martino	1	February 4, 2005	Sanford, Maine	Defeated Apocalypse and The Outpatient in a Triple Threat match.
Title vacated in mid-2005.
Luis Ortiz	1	November 25, 2005	Revere, Massachusetts	Defeated Beau Douglas in tournament final to win vacant title at the 2005 Tony Rumble Mainemorial Show held in the Ringside Entertainment Complex.
Jason Rumble	3	November 25, 2006	Saugus, Massachusetts	Defeated Luis Ortiz and Slyck Wagner in a 3-way match to win the title.
Beau Douglas	2	March 10, 2007	Saugus, Massachusetts	The promotion announces its departure from the National Wrestling Alliance at this same event and the title reverts to its original name.
Renamed CWA Heavyweight Championship
