= Phil Apollo =

American professional wrestler

Personal information
- Born: Phil Pantos Massachusetts, U.S.

Professional wrestling career
- Ring name(s): The American Playboy; Apollo the Greek; Phil Apollo; Phil Pantos; The Playboy; Vince Apollo
- Billed height: 5 ft 10 in (1.78 m)
- Billed weight: 290 lb (130 kg)
- Billed from: Boston, Massachusetts
- Trained by: Killer Kowalski
- Debut: 1986
- Retired: December 1995

Phil Pantos, better known by his ring name Phil Apollo, is an American retired professional wrestler who competed in North American independent wrestling promotions including International Championship Wrestling (ICW) and World Class Championship Wrestling (WCCW). During the 1980s, he was part of Gary Hart's "New Age Management" stable in WCCW and teamed with Eric Sbraccia to form a team known as the Dynamic Duo, winning the ICW Heavyweight Championship twice. He also worked in the World Wrestling Federation from 1991 to 1995.

== Professional wrestling career ==
Phil Pantos trained at Killer Kowalski's wrestling school prior to making his professional wrestling debut in 1986. Using the ring name Phil Apollo working for International Championship Wrestling (ICW) in his native Boston, Massachusetts. In March 1987 Apollo defeated Joseph Savoldi to win the ICW Heavyweight Championship. Later that year Apollo left ICW, vacating the championship in the process. He moved on to working in Texas for World Class Championship Wrestling (WCCW) where he became part of manager Gary Hart's "New Age Management" group who also included Abdullah the Butcher, Al Perez, Jeep Swenson and John Nord. His first major show appearance was as part of WCCW's 1987 "Labor Day Star Wars" show on September 7, 1987 where he defeated Vic Steamboat. A few months later, at WCCW's 1987 Christmas Star Wars he lost to The Missing Link. He later wrestled at the 5th Von Erich Memorial Parade of Champions as well as WCCW's 5th Cotton Bowl extravaganza. Following his stint in WCCW Apollo returned to ICW where he was teamed up with Eric Sbraccia to form a tag team known as the Dynamic Duo, a name taken in tribute to the WCCW team of the same name that was made up of Gentleman Chris Adams and Gino Hernandez. On March 5, 1989 the Dynamic Duo defeated the S & S Express (Vic Steamboat and Joe Savoldi) to win the ICW Tag Team Championship Their first run with the championship lasted 118 days until the S & S Express regained the championship. The Dynamic Duo would briefly hold the tag team championship again in December 1989 as they defeated the Undertakers (Henchman and Punisher) on December 28, then lost the titles to The Lethal Weapons (Dennis Condrey and Doug Gilbert) only two days later.

During the early 1990s, Apollo competed as a preliminary wrestler in the World Wrestling Federation (WWF) most notably facing Adam Bomb with manager Johnny Polo in their debut on Monday Night Raw in 1993. Apollo retired from wrestling in 1995.

== Championships and accomplishments ==
- International Championship Wrestling (New England)

- ICW Heavyweight Championship (1 time)
- ICW Tag Team Championship (2 times) - with Eric Sbraccia

- Pro Wrestling Illustrated

- PWI ranked him # 478 of the 500 best singles wrestlers of the PWI 500 in 1992
