= Tony Atlas =

American professional wrestler, bodybuilder, and powerlifter (born 1954)

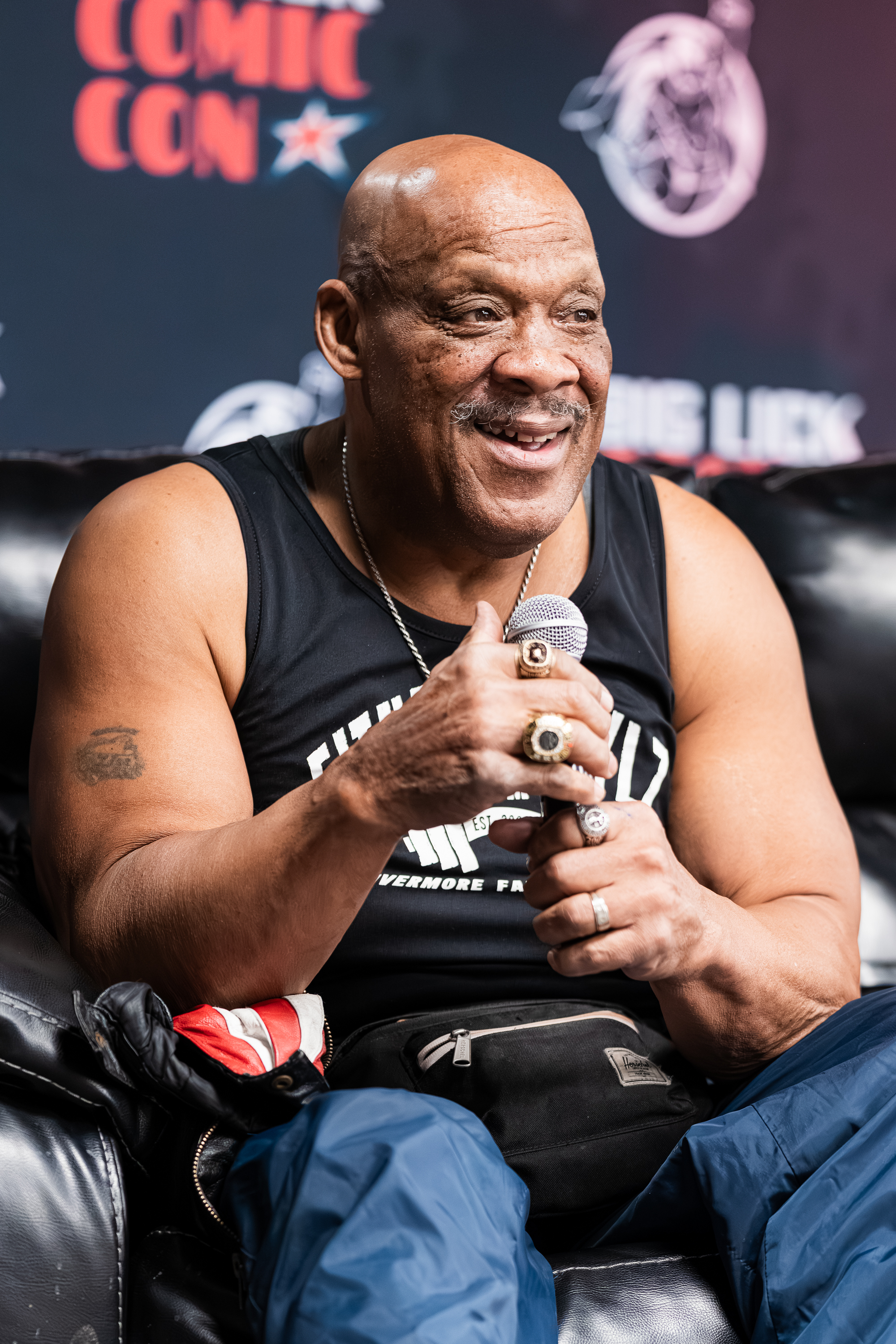
- Atlas in 2026

Personal information
- Born: Anthony White; April 23, 1954 (age 72) Roanoke, Virginia, U.S.
- Spouses: Joyce White (m. 1973; div. 1997) Monika White (m. 2001)
- Children: 1

Professional wrestling career
- Ring name(s): "Mr. USA" Tony Atlas; Saba Simba; Black Atlas; Tony Atlas White; Black Superman
- Billed height: 6 ft 2 in (188 cm)
- Billed weight: 250 lb (113 kg)
- Billed from: Roanoke, Virginia; Jungles of Uganda (as Saba Simba)
- Trained by: Larry Sharpe
- Debut: 1974

Anthony White (born April 23, 1954) better known by his ring name Tony Atlas, is an American bodybuilder, powerlifter, and professional wrestler who has held multiple titles and championships in each sport. He is also known by his bodybuilding title, "Mr. USA", the nom de guerre the "Black Superman", as well as an alter ego named Saba Simba. He returned as an on screen manager for WWE, appearing on its now-defunct ECW brand. He re-signed with WWE on a legends contract in mid-2012.

== Professional wrestling career ==
=== Early career (1974–1984) ===
Following high school, Atlas started wrestling in 1974 for the National Wrestling Alliance World Wide/Mid Atlantic area. His debut, on July 10, was a tag team match with Bob Bruggers against Art Neilson and The Blue Scorpion. The match finished with Atlas winning the fall for his team with a sleeper hold on The Blue Scorpion.

Throughout his career he worked for World Championship Wrestling (WCW), the NWA's Jim Crockett Promotions, the World Wrestling Council (WWC), World Class Championship Wrestling (WCCW), the American Wrestling Association (AWA), and the World Wrestling Federation (WWF). Among his regular partners were Tommy Rich (as "TNT"), Dick Murdoch, and Rocky Johnson. He was also the first man to press slam and pin Hulk Hogan though Hogan's foot was on the rope and the referee did not see it.

During his time with the NWA, Atlas captured the NWA Georgia Tag Team Title with Tommy Rich. He later teamed with Mr. Wrestling II, Thunderbolt Patterson, Kevin Sullivan, and Rocky Johnson.

In 1979, he won the Pro Mr. USA bodybuilding title in the inferior WBBG organization (there were only five competitors). Thereafter, he was frequently promoted as "Mr. USA." That same year, he won a bench press meet, by bench pressing 540 lbs. raw (no bench shirt) in the 242-pound division.

In 1982, he wrestled for New Japan Pro-Wrestling.

From 1982 to 1983 he wrestled for Bill Watts's Universal Wrestling Federation. Then from 1983 to 1984 he returned to Georgia and wrestled in St. Louis.

=== World Wrestling Federation (1979–1984) ===
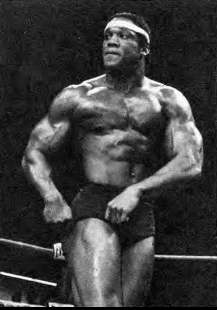
Atlas in 1982

Atlas debuted in the World Wrestling Federation on October 23, 1979, defeating Johnny Rodz at a Championship Wrestling taping. One of his first feuds was with Jesse "The Body" Ventura, over who had the better physique. In 1983, he teamed with Rocky Johnson as The Soul Patrol to defeat The Wild Samoans for the WWF World Tag Team Championship, becoming the company's first black champions. After losing the title to Adrian Adonis and Dick Murdoch and missing shows due to drug addiction, Atlas' final match was on May 16, 1984, in Lacey Township, New Jersey.

=== American Wrestling Association (1984) ===
Two months after departing the World Wrestling Federation, Atlas resurfaced in Verne Gagne's AWA. He made his debut on July 13 at a house show in Denver, Colorado, and defeated Chris Markoff. At the time the AWA was being raided for talent by the WWF; this represented a swing in the opposite direction and Atlas received a push upon joining the promotion. He was undefeated against "Mr Electricity" Steve Regal, Larry Zbyszko, and Jake Milliman in July before finally being defeated by King Kong Bundy on August 11 in Indianapolis, Indiana. This and a disqualification loss to Nick Bockwinkel were Atlas' only defeats in singles competition. On October 10, 1984, he teamed with The Crusher and faced AWA Tag-Team Champions The Road Warriors for a shot at the titles and won by disqualification. Ten days later he teamed with Jim Brunzell for another shot at the Road Warriors, defeating them via pinfall in a non-title match in Las Vegas. His final match with the promotion was a victory against Tom Scott on October 28, after which he returned to the World Wrestling Federation.

=== Return to WWF (1984–1986, 1987) ===
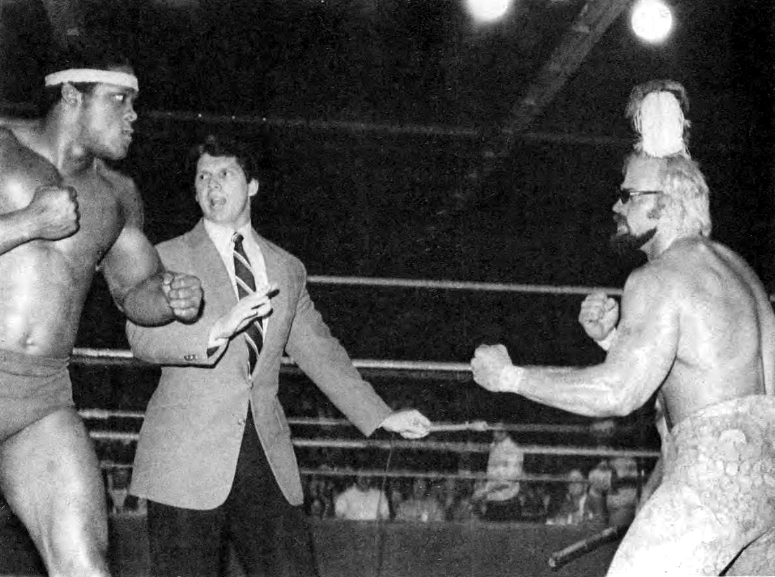
Atlas (left) facing off against Jesse Ventura, with Vince McMahon between the two of them, c. 1982

One day after departing the AWA, Atlas returned to the WWF at a television taping for All Star Wrestling in Hamilton, Ontario, and pinned Rene Goulet in a match that aired on November 17. Upon his return, Atlas was shunted to the mid card in the WWF and was undefeated against competition that included Mr Fuji, The Spoiler, The Iron Sheik, and Moondog Rex. He scored a win against Bob Orton and a non-title victory over WWF Intercontinental Champion Greg Valentine at the Steel Cage Turmoil round robin tournament in Hartford, Connecticut on November 23, 1984 (a predecessor to the King of the Ring tournaments that were held later in the decade as annual house show events), but suffered his first defeat on his comeback when he lost to David Schultz. This would be his only loss for several months, as he would not be pinned again until losing to Paul Orndorff on Prime Time Wrestling on March 19, 1985. At this point Atlas began to transition to a mid-card performer and would lose several matches, including bouts with Bret Hart, Greg Valentine, Don Muraco, and Roddy Piper. The company also programmed him into several short-lived tag-teams with Ivan Putski, Lanny Poffo and George Wells.

Atlas made his PPV debut in 1986 when he appeared in the Battle Royal at Wrestlemania 2 being eliminated by William Perry. He was also used as a jobber to the stars, putting over newly arriving talent like King Kong Bundy and Harley Race, as well as a series of matches with other muscle bound strongmen such as Hercules and "The Worlds Strongest Man" Ted Arcidi, the latter of which in an infamous match at Boston Garden where both men were booed by the crowd and mocked by commentators Gorilla Monsoon & Lord Alfred Hayes for their poor performances. Atlas began to be shunted further down the card, losing to Big John Studd, Iron Sheik, Dory Funk Jr., and Harley Race. His final match was a loss to Adrian Adonis in a bout that took place in Madison Square Garden and which aired on September 8, 1986, on Prime Time Wrestling.

Tony made a one match return on August 28, 1987, when he teamed with The Junkyard Dog to defeat Kamala and Sika at the WWF Paul Boesch Retirement Show.

=== World Class Championship Wrestling (1986–1988) ===
Two months later Tony joined the Texas-based World Class Championship Wrestling (WCCW) where he adopted the moniker of "The Black Superman". He made his initial appearance on November 11, 1986, and defeated Tim Brooks in Fort Worth, Texas. On December 1, Atlas defeated Crusher Yorkoff to win the World Class World Television Championship. In January 1987, Atlas competed in a tournament to crown the Texas Heavyweight Champion, beating Tim Brooks in the opening round but falling to Matt Borne in the quarter-finals. In the summer of 1987 he had almost instant success when he teamed with Skip Young to win the World Class Texas Tag Team Title. Following a match that went to a time limit draw against Al Perez, Atlas left the company in 1988.

=== Puerto Rico and International Championship Wrestling (1988) ===
On July 16, 1988, Atlas was appearing at a WWC event in Bayamón (a city near San Juan), Puerto Rico, where he was one of the 2 witnesses, the other being Dutch Mantel, to the fatal assault on wrestler Bruiser Brody. José Huertas González a.k.a. the Invader, a fellow wrestler and booker, asked Brody to go into the shower to discuss business. Brody entered the shower stall and a few seconds later a scuffle ensued, followed by two groans, loud enough for the entire locker room to hear. Atlas ran to the shower and saw Brody bent over and holding his stomach (Mantel came after him). Atlas and Mantel then looked up at González and saw him holding the knife. When the paramedics arrived, Atlas carried Brody downstairs to the waiting ambulance, as, due to Brody's enormous stature, paramedics were unable to lift him. González, who always maintained his innocence, was initially charged with first-degree murder but was later reduced and tried for involuntary homicide. Both Atlas and Mantel appeared in 2019's Dark Side of the Ring episode on Bruiser Brody and explained what actually happened. Atlas said that he was asked to be in the trial but never got a call back because the case was already finalized.

Atlas then moved on to Southern Ontario area in late 1988. He joined International Championship Wrestling (owned and operated by Mario Savoldi) where he turned heel and under the management of The Duke (not Pete Doherty) won the ICW Heavyweight title from Joe Savoldi. Atlas lost the belt to Vic Steamboat in Middletown, New York. But after a few months, he regained the belt from Steamboat. That match became infamous because of the number of times it was shown on the IWCCW syndicated show. Afterwards he was inactive from wrestling due to being homeless for a year and a half.

=== Third return to WWF (1990–1991) ===
In 1990 Atlas returned to the WWF where he wrestled as "Saba Simba" for the remainder of 1990 and into January 1991. He made his first appearance in his comeback on August 4, 1990, when he pinned Haku at a house show in Augusta, Georgia. On August 28 he participated in a taping for WWF Superstars and Prime Time Wrestling. In his first televised appearance as Simba, Atlas's history in the company was quickly acknowledged, but Vince McMahon claimed Atlas had "rediscovered his roots by legally changing his name". On December 13, 2010, Tony appeared on Right After Wrestling and credited the Saba Simba character with saving his life as he was homeless and living on a park bench before getting a phone call from McMahon. He played a warrior of a Ugandan tribe and was intended to feud with Akeem, but the feud never took place after Akeem departed from the promotion. Atlas was kept at midcard status, losing to Dino Bravo and The Barbarian. The gimmick has been described by one writer as "unpopular at best, and racist at worst." He participated at the 1991 Royal Rumble, where he was eliminated by Rick Martel. After the Royal Rumble, he was taken off television and was inactive with the company. His last match was on September 13, 1991, at a house show in Allentown, Pennsylvania, filling in for Jim Neidhart, losing to Irwin R. Schyster as Saba Simba.

=== Sporadic independent appearances (1991–1992) ===
After he left the WWF he returned to IWCCW shortly thereafter facing Tito Santana and Vic Steamboat. He would regain the IWCCW title. He defeated Jimmy Snuka on an independent show on June 28, 1992, in Wallingford, Connecticut. He later left IWCCW which left the IWCCW title vacant.

=== World Championship Wrestling (1992–1993) ===
Teaming with The Barbarian, Atlas made his debut as a heel for WCW on the October 10, 1992, with a victory over Jeff Daniels and TA McCoy. They were immediately programmed by WCW Vice President Bill Watts into a feud with Barry Windham and Dustin Rhodes. He suffered his first pinfall when he was defeated by Tom Zenk in Chicago, Illinois on October 31, 1992. Atlas entered the King of Cable tournament but was defeated by Big Van Vader in the quarterfinals. On the house show circuit he continued his partnership with the Barbarian and received title matches against Ricky Steamboat and Shane Douglas, but were unsuccessful in obtaining the NWA/WCW Tag-Team Championship.

On January 2, 1993, Atlas entered a tournament to crown a new United States Heavyweight Champion following the vacating of the title by an injured Rick Rude. Atlas pinned Van Hammer in the quarterfinals. In the semi-finals he fell to Dustin Rhodes. Atlas also became part of a storyline where a bounty had been placed on rookie Erik Watts head; Atlas entered a house show series in January 1993 with the young Watts but was winless. He made an appearance on Clash of the Champions XXII in Milwaukee, Wisconsin on January 13, 1993, and lost an arm wrestling contest to Vinnie Vegas. Following a match with Steve Regal on February 5, Atlas left the promotion.

=== Independent circuit (1993–present) ===
Atlas returned to IWCCW in the fall of 1993 and faced Tommy Dreamer, Johnny Gunn, Tito Santana, and Primo Carnera III. He also wrestled for the CWA (Century Wrestling Alliance) in 1994, and in 1995 joined the upstart American Wrestling Federation (AWF). He teamed with Koko B. Ware to face Greg Valentine and Tommy Rich for the vacant AWF Tag-Team Championship. Apart from his AWF appearances Atlas wrestled primarily with the CWA in 1995 through 1997.

On July 11, 1999, he teamed with Tito Santana to defeat Salvatore Bellomo and Jay Love at WXW Sportsfest 1999 in Allentown, Pennsylvania.

He made a return to Puerto Rico's WWC defeating Dutch Mantel on July 16, 2000, at WWC 27th anniversary event. On November 19, 2005, Atlas defeated Tracy Smothers at CCW A Tribute to Starrcade in Spartanburg, South Carolina.

Since 2006 he has made occasional appearances for Big Time Wrestling and Top Rope Promotions both in New England. He teamed with Bushwhacker Luke to defeat Eric Johnson and Thad Hairy Howett at UCW in Kentville, Nova Scotia, on April 28, 2018. On May 25, 2018, he defeated Nathan Banner by disqualification in Pembroke, Ontario, for Great North Wrestling. On May 17, 2019, he teamed with Frankie Flow to defeat Gene Snitsky and Salvatore Sincere Managed by Lance Profit at East Coast Pro wrestling in Manville, New Jersey.

On March 25, 2023, Atlas and Bob Orton Jr. won the SICW Tag Team titles defeating the LA Hustlers – Bradley Driggs and Lamonte Potts in St. Louis, Missouri.Then on May 30, 2026, Atlas won the ISPW Tri-State Championship in Wallington, New Jersey.

=== Later WWF/E appearances (1997, 2006–2014) ===
Atlas made a surprise return to the WWF on the March 10, 1997, edition of Monday Night Raw. Following a victory by Intercontinental Champion Rocky Maivia over Tony Roy, Atlas came out of the crowd to congratulate the son of his former tag-team partner Rocky Johnson. One week later he appeared on Raw again, this time holding Maivia back from attacking The Sultan. At WrestleMania 13 he was spotted in the crowd and cheering for Maivia. Atlas was shown on Raw once more, again cheering for Maivia on the March 31 edition when Maivia wrestled Bret Hart.

Atlas was inducted into the WWE Hall of Fame in 2006 by S. D. Jones.

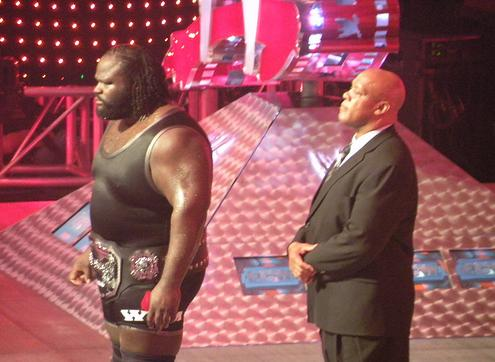
Mark Henry accompanied by Tony Atlas

Atlas appeared on the July 8, 2008, airing of ECW where Theodore Long appointed him the special guest ring announcer for the main event featuring Tommy Dreamer with then-babyface, Colin Delaney in his corner against then-heel, ECW Champion Mark Henry. Atlas attacked Delaney, which in turn distracted Dreamer, allowing Henry to gain the victory. Atlas then announced Henry the winner of the bout, although the official result was a double countout. This is also the first time since his brief stint in WCW in 1992 that Atlas has worked as a heel, as he would then become Henry's manager.

Atlas helped Mark Henry retain his title at SummerSlam by disqualification, attacking Matt Hardy once a win by Hardy appeared to be imminent. Atlas also helped Henry retain his championship on the August 19, 2008, episode of ECW against Hardy. At Unforgiven, Henry lost the title to Hardy. On the December 9 edition of ECW, Atlas wrestled in a WWE ring for the first time in 17 years (along with Mark Henry) in a tag team match, where they defeated Finlay and Hornswoggle. He also wrestled Evan Bourne on the June 9, 2009, episode of ECW in a losing effort. Henry was then traded to the Raw brand on June 29, quietly ending their alliance. Atlas would continue to appear on ECW during The Abraham Washington Show as Abraham Washington's sidekick, until ECW went off air in February 2010. It was during this time, that Atlas became known for his distinctive, 'uh-ha-ha' type laughing.

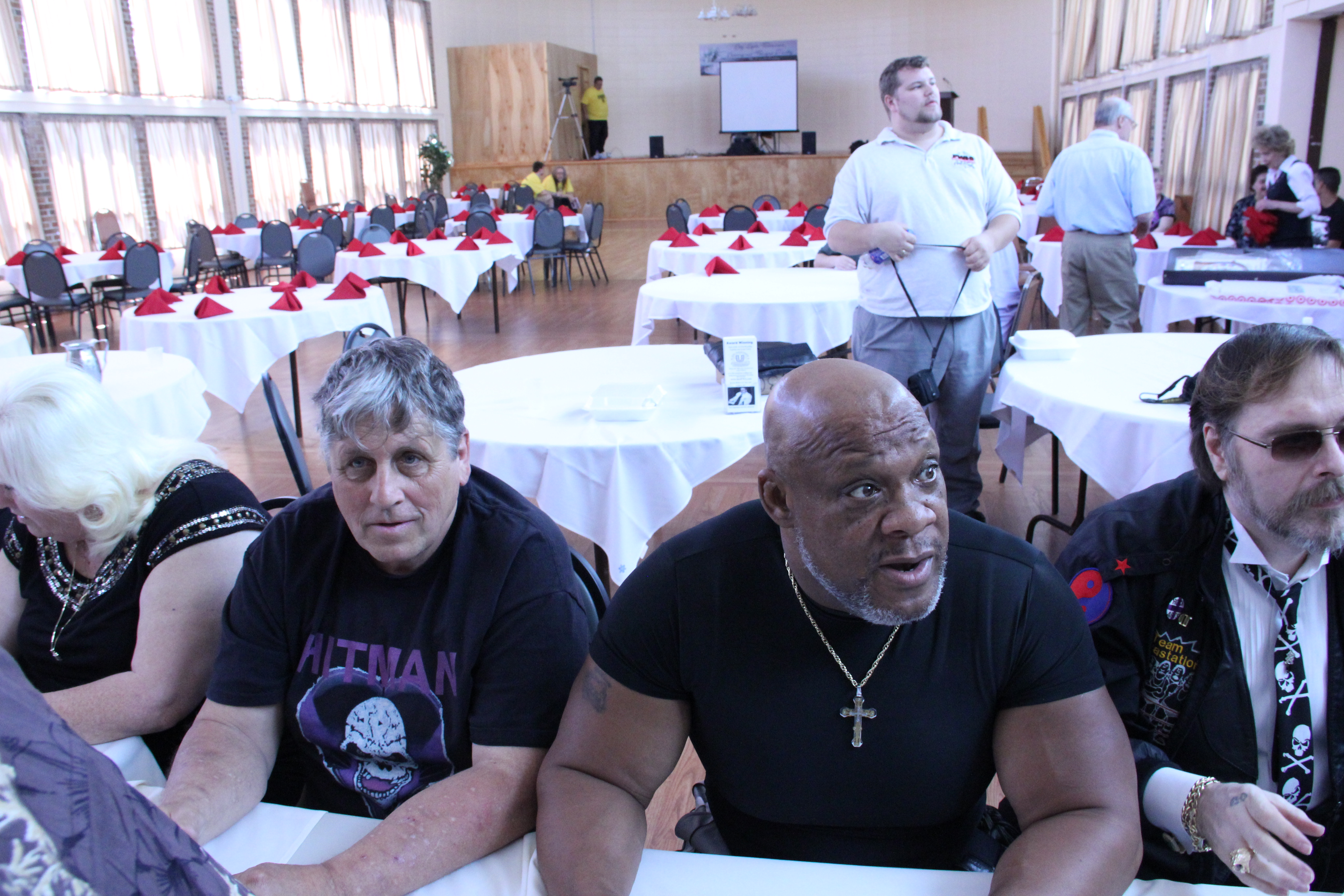
Smith Hart and Tony Atlas in 2012

Atlas was released from his WWE contract on April 30, 2010. However he still made sporadic appearances with the company; he made a brief appearance on the Old School Raw episode on November 15, 2010. On December 12, 2011, he made a brief appearance to co-present the Slammy Award for "Trending Superstar of the Year." On April 10, 2012, Atlas made an appearance on SmackDown: Blast from the Past.

In 2014, Atlas was a regular cast member on the WWE Network original reality show, Legends' House.

== Books ==
ATLAS: Too Much...Too Soon was released in 2010.

== Personal life ==
White was born in Roanoke, Virginia, and attended Patrick Henry High School, graduating in 1974. He now lives with his wife Monika, whom he met during a period of living on a park bench following his first release from WWE, in Auburn, Maine. With his ex-wife Joyce, he has one daughter named Nikki.

White has been open about what he calls his non-sexual shoe fetish, which involves paying women to step on him. He stated in an interview, "I, Tony 'Mr. USA' Atlas, WWE Hall of Famer, am free to be me. And there is nothing greater on this Planet Earth than to get kicked and punched in the face by a big-footed girl."

White was once a frequent co-host of the popular YouTube wrestling interview channel Boston Wrestling MWF. However, following his co-host bringing up the controversial wrestler New Jack, White responded negatively and later left the show. The next episodes were co-hosted by New Jack, who criticized White.

== Championships and accomplishments ==
- Americas Wrestling Federation
  - AWF North America Heavyweight Championship (1 time)
- Cauliflower Alley Club
  - Legends Legacy Award (2026)
- Century Wrestling Alliance
  - CWA Heavyweight Championship (1 time)
- Eastern Wrestling Alliance
  - EWA Heavyweight Championship (1 time)
- Georgia Championship Wrestling
  - NWA Georgia Heavyweight Championship (1 time)
  - NWA Georgia Tag Team Championship (4 times) – with Tommy Rich (1), Mr. Wrestling II (1), Thunderbolt Patterson (1), and Kevin Sullivan (1)
- Independent Superstars Of Pro Wrestling
  - ISPW Tri-State Championship (1 time, current)
- International Professional Wrestling Hall of Fame
  - Class of 2025 – with Rocky Johnson
- International World Class Championship Wrestling
  - IWCCW Heavyweight Championship (2 times)
- International Wrestling (Quebec)
  - WCWA Brass Knuckles Championship (1 time)
- Mid-Atlantic Championship Wrestling
  - NWA Mid-Atlantic Heavyweight Championship (1 time)
  - NWA World Tag Team Championship ( Mid – Atlantic version ) (1 time) – with Thunderbolt Patterson
- NWA Tri-State^{1}
  - NWA West Virginia/Ohio Heavyweight Championship (1 time)
- New England Pro Wrestling
  - NEPW Heavyweight Championship (1 time)
- New England Pro Wrestling Hall of Fame
  - Class of 2009
- Pro Wrestling Illustrated
  - PWI Most Improved Wrestler of the Year (1980)
  - PWI ranked him #64 of the 500 best singles wrestlers of the year on the PWI 500 list in 1996
  - PWI ranked him #171 of the top 500 wrestlers of the "PWI Years" in 2003
- Southern Illinois Championship Wrestling
  - SICW Tag Team Championship (1 time) – with Bob Orton Jr.
- Southwest Championship Wrestling
  - SCW Southwest Brass Knuckles Championship (1 time)
- L&G Promotions
  - L&G Promotions Caribbean Heavyweight Championship (2 times)
- Universal Superstars of America
  - USA Tag Team Championship (1 time) – with S. D. Jones
- World Class Wrestling Association
  - WCWA Television Championship (1 time)
  - WCWA Texas Tag Team Championship (1 time) – with Skip Young
- World Wide Wrestling Alliance
  - WWWA Intercontinental Championship (2 times)
- World Wrestling Council
  - WWC North American Tag Team Championship (1 time) – with Miguel Pérez, Jr.
- World Wrestling Federation / World Wrestling Entertainment
  - WWF Tag Team Championship (1 time) – with Rocky Johnson
  - WWE Hall of Fame (Class of 2006)
- World Bodybuilding Guild
  - WBBG Hall Of Fame (Class of 2007)

^{1}This promotion is not to be confused with the NWA Tri–State promotion founded by Leroy McGuirk in the 1950s. This promotion would eventually be taken over by Bill Watts in 1979 and renamed Mid-South Wrestling Association. The promotion would eventually be renamed Universal Wrestling Federation.

- Wrestling Observer Newsletter
  - Strongest Wrestler (1981)

== Notes ==
- Mick Foley (2000). Have A Nice Day: A Tale of Blood and Sweatsocks. HarperCollins. p. 511. ISBN 0-06-103101-1.
