= Vic Steamboat =

American professional wrestler (born 1960)

Personal information
- Born: Victor Hersey Blood; April 18, 1960 (age 66) Honolulu, Hawaii, U.S.

Professional wrestling career
- Ring name: Vic Steamboat
- Billed height: 6 ft 3 in (1.91 m)
- Billed weight: 235 lb (107 kg)
- Debut: 1986
- Retired: 1998

Victor Hersey Blood (born April 18, 1960) is an American former professional wrestler, best known by his ring name Vic Steamboat. He is the younger brother of professional wrestler Ricky Steamboat, whom he took his ring name after. The majority of Steamboat's wrestling career was spent in the North Eastern United States working for promotions such as International Championship Wrestling / International World Class Championship Wrestling and Century Wrestling Alliance / NWA Cold Front / NWA New England, holding championships on several occasions.

== Professional wrestling career ==
=== World Class Wrestling Association (1986–1988) ===
Victor Blood made his professional wrestling debut on December 7, 1986, adopting the ring name Vic Steamboat from his first match on. In mid-1987 he worked for the Dallas, Texas-based World Class Wrestling Association (WCWA) as a low level wrestler. On September 7, 1987 he was part of the 1987 Labor Day Star Wars major show, losing to Vince Apollo in the second match of the night. A few months later he was part of WCWA's Thanksgiving Star Wars, losing to Killer Tim Brooks in the first match of the show.

=== International Championship Wrestling / International World Class Championship Wrestling (1988–1991) ===
After spending some time wrestling in Texas Blood moved to the North Eastern united states, making his debut as Vic Steamboat for the Boston, Massachusetts based International Championship Wrestling (ICW) promotion. In ICW he formed a regular tag team with Joe Savoldi, known as "The S & S Express". In September 1988 the S & S Express defeated Moondog Spike and The Dungeon Master to win the ICW Tag Team Championship. Their first run with the titles ended on March 5, 1989 where the S & S Express was defeated by a team known as "the Dynamic Duo" (Phil Apollo and Eric Sbraccia). The S & S Express regained the championship on July 1, 1989 and held them until December 11 of that year where they lost to "The Undertakers" (Henchman and Punisher). When then champion Eric Sbraccia did not show up for a scheduled title match Steamboat teamed with Phil Apolo, only to lose the championship to The Lethal Weapons (Dennis Condrey and Doug Gilbert). Later on ICW was renamed International World Class Championship Wrestling (IWCCW). On July 24, 1990 Vic Steamboat won his first singles title, as he defeated Tony Atlas to win the IWCCW Heavyweight Championship, becoming the top wrestler in the federation. His run at the top lasted until April 19, 1991 where Atlas regained the championship.

=== Century Wrestling Alliance (1991–1998) ===
A while later Steamboat and a number of other IWCCW wrestlers left the promotion to form Century Wrestling Alliance (CWA), later known as NWA Cold Front and finally NWA New England. While working for the CWA and subsequent promotions Steamboat held the CWA Heavyweight Championship twice, the CWA Television Championship twice, the CWA Tag Team Championship with Ray Odyssey as well as the NWA Cold Front Heavyweight Championship twice and the NWA New England Television Championship once.

=== World Wrestling Federation (1991) ===
On July 29, 1991 Vic Steamboat wrestled as Jesse Bolt for the World Wrestling Federation on a Superstars taping in Worcester, MA by defeating The Brooklyn Brawler. The following day at the Wrestling Challenge taping in Portland, ME, Steamboat would again defeat the Brawler.

=== World Championship Wrestling (1996) ===
On October 1, 1996 Steamboat wrestled for World Championship Wrestling on their weekly show, WCW Saturday Night against Arn Anderson in a match airing from Canton, OH.

== Championships and accomplishments ==
- Can-Am Wrestling

- Can-Am Heavyweight Championship (1 time)

- Century Wrestling Alliance / NWA Cold Front/ NWA New England

- CWA Heavyweight Championship (2 times)
- CWA Television Championship (2 times)
- CWA Tag Team Championship (1 time) - with Ray Odyssey
- NWA Cold Front Heavyweight Championship (2 times)
- NWA New England Television Championship (1 time)

- International Championship Wrestling / International World Class Championship Wrestling

- IWCCW Heavyweight Championship (1 time)
- ICW Tag Team Championship (2 times) - with Joe Savoldi

- Pro Wrestling Illustrated

- PWI ranked him # 106 of the 500 best singles wrestlers of the PWI 500 in 1993
