= IWCCW Tag Team Championship =

Professional wrestling tag team championship

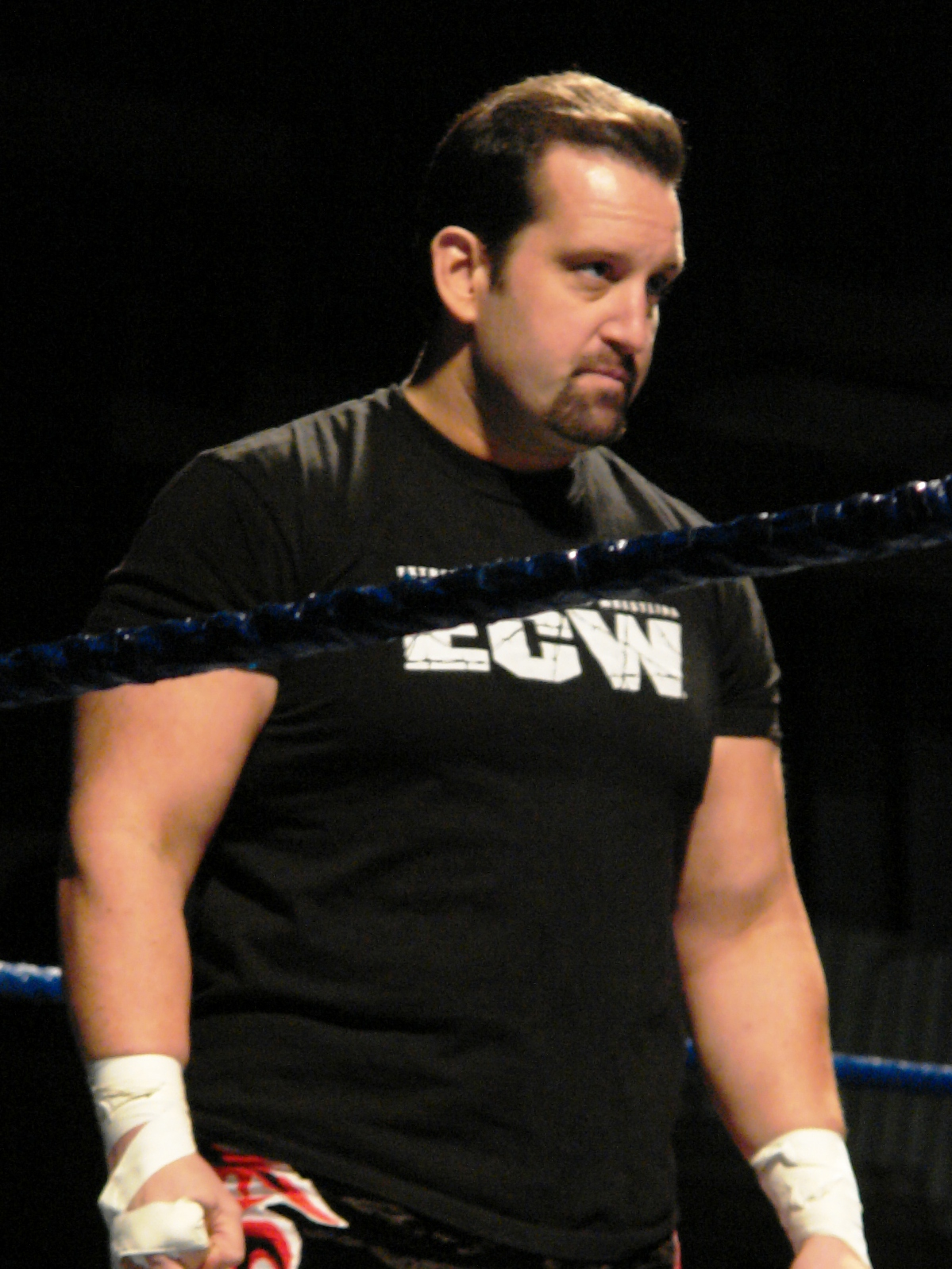
- T.D. Madison as Tommy Dreamer in 2008

Details
- Promotion: International Championship Wrestling (1984–January 1991); International World Class Championship Wrestling (January 1991–1995)
- Date established: 1984
- Date retired: 1995

Other name
- ICW Tag Team Championship
Statistics
- First champion: IWCCW Tag Team Championship
- Most reigns: (As a Tag Team) The Madison Brothers/The Billion Dollar Babies (3 reigns) (As Individual) Joe Savoldi (3 reigns)
- Longest reign: The Masked Russians (639 days+) (Note: The date the championship was won has not been documented which means the championship reign lasted anywhere between 639 days and 921 days)
- Shortest reign: The Billion Dollar Babies/The Equalizers (0 days)

The ICW / IWCCW Tag-Team Championship was the top tag-team championship of International World Class Championship Wrestling between 1984 and 1995 where IWCCW closed down operations. Since the ICW/IWCCW championships were not given "world title" status by Pro Wrestling Illustrated, this championship was seen as a regional championship, although it was considered the top singles championship of the promotion. Initially ICW’s main title was the WWC World Tag Team Championship, through a talent exchange program and a close working relationship between ICW and WWC the Universal Title was promoted in the New England area as the main ICW title without ever mentioning the WWC name, nor was it presented as a title owned by ICW. When the arrangement came to an end in 1985 a specific “ICW Tag-Team Championship” was created with the lineage of the WWC Tag-Team title during the time of the working relationship. Because the championship is a professional wrestling championship, it is not won or lost competitively but instead by the decision of the bookers of a wrestling promotion. The championship is awarded after the chosen team "wins" a match to maintain the illusion that professional wrestling is a competitive sport.

== Title history ==
Key
No.	Overall reign number
Reign	Reign number for the specific team—reign numbers for the individuals are in parentheses, if different
Days	Number of days held

No.	Champion	Championship change			Reign statistics		Notes	Ref.
No.	Champion	Date	Event	Location	Reign	Days	Notes	Ref.
ICW Tag Team Championship
1	Super Médico I and Black Gordman	December 8, 1984	N/A	N/A	1	(Note: The date the championship was won has not been documented which means the championship reign lasted anywhere between 6 days and 371 days)	Super Médico I and Black Gordman were the WWC world tag-team Champions when ICW was founded and recognized as the first tag-team champions to represent ICW.	
2	The New York Rockers (Joe Savoldi and Al Perez)	January 6, 1985	WWC Live event	San Juan, Puerto Rico	1	76		
—	Vacated	March 23, 1985	—	—	—	—	Held up after a match against Fidel Sierra and Mexican Angel. This marked the end of the ICW/WWC joint title lineage.	
3	The Masked Russians	1985	ICW show	(Note: The location of the match was not captured as part of the championship documentation.)	1		The Masked Russians were the first champions to be recognized as the “ICW Tag-Team Champions”.	
4	Tom Brandi and Prince Mike Kaluha	June 1, 1987 (NLT)	ICW show		1	(Note: The date the championship was won has not been documented which means the championship reign lasted anywhere between 1 day and 920 days)		
5	The Moondogs (Spot and Spike)	December 28, 1987	ICW show		1	(Note: The date the championship was won has not been documented which means the championship reign lasted anywhere between 4 days and 247 days)		
6	Moondog Spike (2) and The Dungeon Master	1988	ICW show		1	(Note: The date the championship was won has not been documented which means the championship reign lasted anywhere between 1 day and 244 days)	The Dungeon Master replaced Moondog Spot when he left ICW.	
7	The S & S Express (Vic Steamboat and Joe Savoldi (2))	August 20, 1988 (NLT)	ICW show	Presque Isle, Maine	1	(Note: The date the championship was won has not been documented which means the championship reign lasted anywhere between 185 days and 428 days)		
8	The Dynamic Duo (Phil Apollo and Eric Sbraccia)	March 5, 1989	ICW show	Augusta, Maine	1	118		
9	The S & S Express (Vic Steamboat (2) and Joe Savoldi (3))	July 1, 1989	ICW show	Marlboro, Massachusetts	2	163		
10	The Undertakers (Henchman and Punisher)	December 11, 1989	ICW show	Newark, New Jersey	1	17		
11	The Dynamic Duo (Phil Apollo and Eric Sbraccia)	December 28, 1989	ICW show	Portland, Maine	2	2		
12	The Lethal Weapons (Dennis Condrey and Doug Gilbert)	December 30, 1989	ICW show	Augusta, Maine	1	169	Defeated Phil Apollo and Vic Steamboat when Eric Sbraccia did not show up.	
—	Vacated	March 30, 1990	N/A	N/A	—	—	The Lethal Weapons left ICW.	
IWCCW Tag Team Championship
13	The Undertakers (Henchman and Punisher)	March 31, 1990	IWCCW show	Charlton, Massachusetts	2	326	Defeated Phil Apollo and Eric Sbraccia for the vacant titles.	
14	The Billion Dollar Babies (Mike Sampson and G.Q. Stratus)	February 20, 1991	IWCCW show	Monticello, New York	1	0		
15	The Madison Brothers (T.D. and G.Q.)	February 20, 1991	IWCCW show	Monticello, New York	1	3		
16	The Equalizers (Zip and Zap)	February 23, 1991	IWCCW show	Meriden, Connecticut	1	14		
17	The Madison Brothers (T.D. and G.Q.)	March 9, 1991	IWCCW show	Staten Island, New York	2	41		
18	The Georgia Guerillas	April 19, 1991	IWCCW show	South China, Maine	1	(Note: The date the championship was won has not been documented which means the championship reign lasted anywhere between 1 day and 11 days)		
19	The Madison Brothers (T.D. and G.Q.)	April 30, 1991 (NLT)	IWCCW show		3	(Note: The date the championship was won has not been documented which means the championship reign lasted anywhere between 32 days and 42 days)		
20	The Billion Dollar Babies (Mike Sampson and G.Q. Stratus)	June 1, 1991	IWCCW show	Wolfeboro, New Hampshire	2	4	Defeated T.D. Madison in a handicap match.	
21	The Equalizers (Zip and Zap)	June 5, 1991	IWCCW show	Brooklyn, New York	2	0		
22	The Billion Dollar Babies (Mike Sampson and G.Q. Stratus)	June 5, 1991	IWCCW show	Brooklyn, New York	3	299		
—	Vacated	February 28, 1992	N/A	N/A	—	—	The Million Dollar Babies left the promotion.	
23	The Sioux War Party (Dancing Wolf and White Cloud)	May 2, 1992	IWCCW show	Hamburg, Pennsylvania	1	7	Defeated the Canadians in the finals of an 8 team tournament.	
24	Jimmy Deo and L.A. Gore	May 9, 1992	IWCCW show	Dover, New Hampshire	1	395		
25	The Sioux War Party (Dancing Wolf and White Cloud)	June 8, 1993	IWCCW show	Dover, New Hampshire	2	(Note: The date the championship was vacated has not been documented which means the championship reign lasted anywhere between 207 days and 571 days)		
—	Vacated	1994	N/A	N/A	—	—	The Sioux War Party left the promotion.	
26	The Samoan Gangsters (Mack Daddy Kane and Sammy the Silk)	December 26, 1995	IWCCW show	Hamburg, Pennsylvania	1	(Note: The date IWCCW was closed has not been documented which means the championship reign lasted anywhere between 1 day and 5 days)	Won a Tournament	
—	Deactivated	1995	N/A	N/A	—	—	IWCCW Closed	
