= Angelo Savoldi =

Italian/American professional wrestler (1914–2013)

Personal information
- Born: Mario Louis Fornini; April 21, 1914 Castrocielo, Italy
- Died: September 20, 2013 (aged 99) Parsipanny, New Jersey, U.S.

Professional wrestling career
- Ring name: Angelo Savoldi
- Billed height: 6 ft 3 in (191 cm)
- Billed weight: 210 lb (95 kg)
- Billed from: Hoboken, New Jersey
- Debut: 1937
- Retired: 1972

Mario Louis Fornini (April 21, 1914 – September 20, 2013) was an Italian/American professional wrestler and wrestling promoter, better known professionally as Angelo Savoldi. At the time of his death, he was known as the world's oldest retired wrestler at the age of 99.

== Early life ==
Fornini was born in Castrocielo, Italy in 1914. At the age of five, he and his family moved to the United States, where they lived in Hoboken, New Jersey. As a child, Fornini was reportedly friends with Frank Sinatra. He first began to wrestle at A. J. Demarest High School (since replaced by Hoboken High School), but left during the Great Depression to get a job cutting metal at the Cleveland Container.

== Professional wrestling career ==
Fornini's brother Lou was a professional wrestler in New York, and so Fornini approached New York promoter Jack Pfefer. Pfefer christened him "Angelo Savoldi", and, billed as the brother of Joe Savoldi, he began wrestling in 1937. By 1938, Savoldi was regularly wrestling throughout the Northeastern United States. During World War II, Fornini joined the United States Navy. He later worked in Puerto Rico, becoming the first American to main event in that region.

It was in the 1950s that Savoldi became a star in the Oklahoma region, as a junior heavyweight (a term for lightweight). Wrestling as a heel (villainous character), he held the NWA World Junior Heavyweight Championship three times between 1958 and 1964. In Oklahoma, Savoldi feuded with Danny Hodge. On May 27, 1960, Savoldi and Hodge were facing off in a match, when Savoldi was stabbed with a pen knife by an angry fan that turned out to be Hodge's father.

Savoldi finished his in-ring career with the World Wide Wrestling Federation (now WWE) from 1963 to 1972 putting over the promotion's faces. He was also a trainer of younger wrestlers, with Jack Brisco and Hercules Ayala Cortez among them. In the 1970s Savoldi was a minority business partner in the WWWF.

In 1984 Angelo, with his sons Mario, Tom and Joseph Savoldi, established International Championship Wrestling (ICW) in the Northeastern region. Joseph was a featured wrestler for the promotion. Angelo received the Lifetime Achievement Award from the Cauliflower Alley Club in 2003, and was inducted into the Professional Wrestling Hall of Fame in 2004.

== Personal life ==
Fornini and his wife were married for 74 years, and had four sons. They lived in Parsippany, New Jersey, where Fornini owned a record shop with his son Mario.

== Death ==
Fornini died at his home on September 20, 2013, at the age of 99. On the September 23, 2013, episode of WWE Raw, a short "in memoriam" video narrated by Vince McMahon was aired.

== Championships and accomplishments ==
- Cauliflower Alley Club
  - Art Abrams Lifetime Achievement Award (2003)
- National Wrestling Alliance
  - NWA Hall of Fame (Class of 2011)
- NWA Tri-State
  - NWA World Junior Heavyweight Championship (5 times)
- New England Pro Wrestling Hall of Fame
  - Class of 2010
- Professional Wrestling Hall of Fame and Museum
  - Pioneer Era inductee in 2004

== See also ==
- List of oldest surviving professional wrestlers
