= Joseph Savoldi =

American professional wrestler (born 1957)

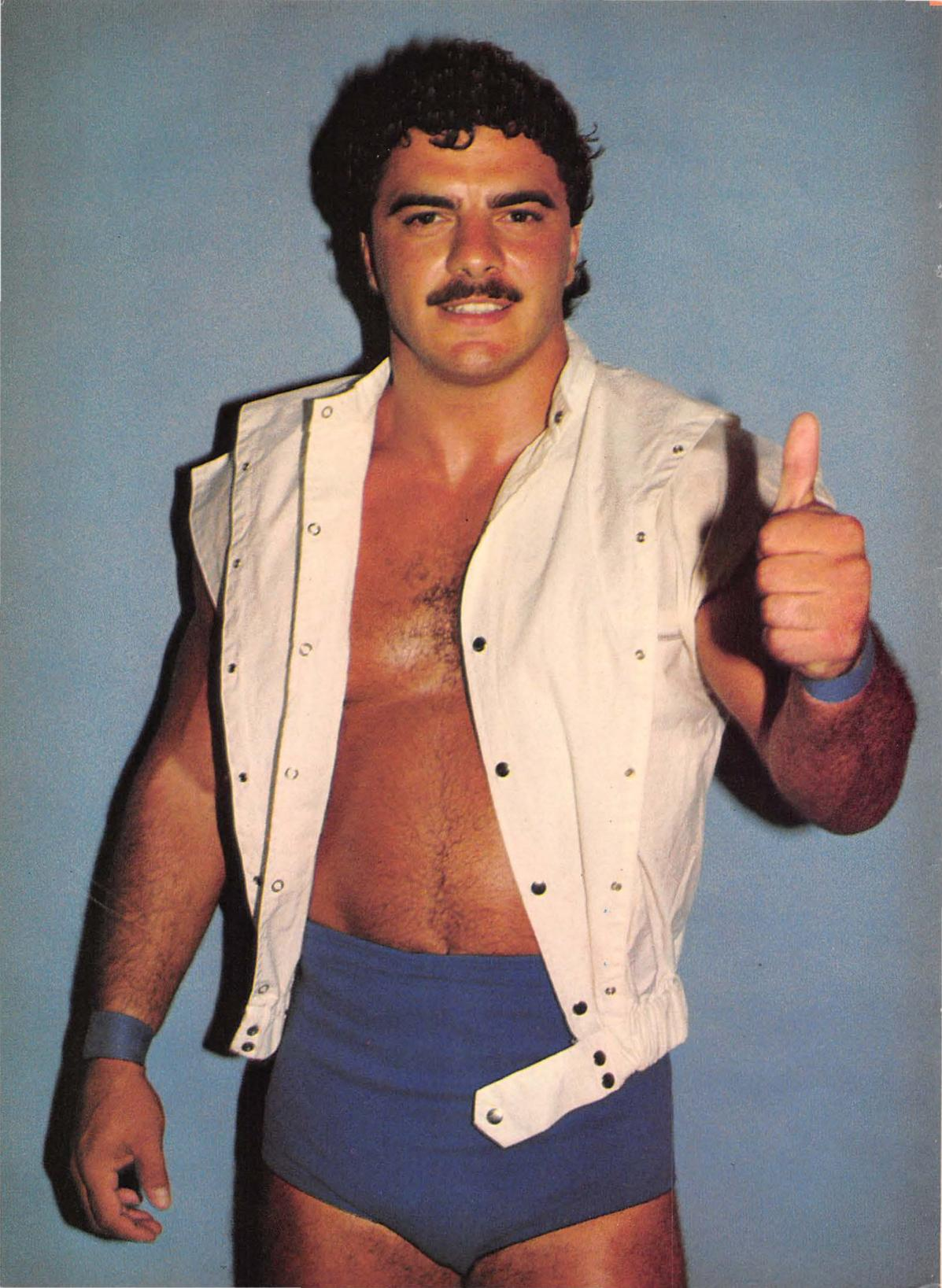
- Savoldi, circa 1985

Personal information
- Born: Joseph Fornini; July 24, 1957 (age 69)

Professional wrestling career
- Ring name: Joe Savoldi
- Billed height: 6 ft 0 in (183 cm)
- Billed weight: 220 lb (100 kg)
- Debut: 1982
- Retired: 1995

Joseph Fornini, better known by his ring name "Jumping" Joe Savoldi (born July 24, 1957) is an American professional wrestler and the son of wrestler Angelo Savoldi. While it has been claimed he is related to the original Joe Savoldi that is not accurate, his father was a storyline brother of Joe Savoldi, but not related by blood. Savoldi was most notable for his time in International Championship Wrestling / International World Class Championship Wrestling owned and operated by his father Angelo and his brother Mario Savoldi. Not related to Joe Savoldi.

== Professional wrestling career ==
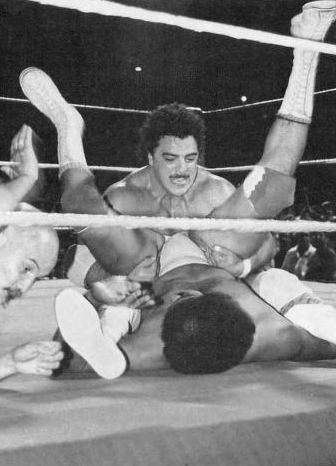
Joseph Savoldi (top) pins Cipriano Armientas (bottom), circa 1985

Fornini made his in ring wrestling debut in 1982 adopting the name "Jumping" Joe Savoldi, adopting the storyline last name of his father, Angelo Savoldi. Savoldi has competed in North American and international promotions since the 1980s, most notably for his father's International World Class Championship Wrestling, the World Wrestling Council in Puerto Rico, Mid-South Wrestling (later Universal Wrestling Federation) and the National Wrestling Alliance. He has been part of two teams, the New York Rockers (also known as the Rock 'N' Roll Rockers) with Al Perez and the S & S Express with Steve Simpson who would later hold the NWA Pacific Northwest Tag Team Championship in 1985. Savoldi later reformed the S & S Express with Vic Steamboat in ICW (the precursor to IWCCW) and would hold the tag-team titles twice during 1988 and 1989.

== Championships and accomplishments ==
- International Championship Wrestling

- ICW Heavyweight Championship (4 times)
- ICW Tag Team Championship (2 times) - with Vic Steamboat

- International World Class Championship Wrestling

- IWCCW Light Heavyweight Championship (2 times)

- Pacific Northwest Wrestling

- NWA Pacific Northwest Tag Team Championship (1 time) with Steve Simpson

- New England Pro Wrestling Hall of Fame

- Class of 2010

- World Wrestling Council

- WWC Tag Team Championship (1 time) with Al Perez

- Pro Wrestling Illustrated

- PWI ranked him # 160 of the 500 best singles wrestlers of the PWI 500 in 1993
