= International World Class Championship Wrestling =

Professional wrestling promotion (1984–1996)

- Acronym: IWCCW
- Founded: 1984
- Defunct: 1996
- Style: American Wrestling
- Headquarters: Boston, Massachusetts (1984–1990); Parsippany, New Jersey (1990); Broward County, Florida (1990)
- Founder: Angelo Savoldi
- Owner(s): Angelo Savoldi (1984–1990); Mario Savoldi (1990)
- Parent: International Championship Wrestling (1985–1991); International World Class; Championship Wrestling (1991–1995)
- Sister: World Class Championship Wrestling
- Formerly: International Championship Wrestling

International World Class Championship Wrestling (IWCCW, originally known as International Championship Wrestling) was an independent professional wrestling promotion based in Boston, Massachusetts. It was promoted by Angelo Savoldi and his sons Mario, Tom, and Joseph Savoldi.

An "outlaw" wrestling promotion in the 1980s, International World Class Championship Wrestling held interpromotional events with the Puerto Rican-based World Wrestling Council, the American Wrestling Association and World Class Championship Wrestling. Many of its former roster would later find success in the World Wrestling Federation, World Championship Wrestling, Extreme Championship Wrestling and elsewhere during the 1990s.

== History ==
=== ICW: 1984−1991 ===
Originally known as International Championship Wrestling (not to be confused with the similarly named ICW promotion run by Angelo Poffo between 1978 and 1984, or the ICW promotion run by George and Gil Culkin from 1977 to 1979), the promotion started holding events the Boston area sometime around 1984 or 1985. Initially ICW was affiliated with the Puerto Rico-based World Wrestling Council, recognizing the WWC Universal Heavyweight Championship and the WWC Tag Team Championship as the top championships in the promotion. The titles were never clearly named as “WWC” titles on ICW television, nor were they presented as being owned by ICW. On February 27, 1985, Dory Funk, Jr. defeated Carlos Colón for the WWC Universal Heavyweight Title in Bangor, Maine. It marked the first time that the WWC Universal Title changed hands outside of Puerto Rico. During the time WWC and ICW had a working relationship talent from both federations travelled to the other federation to compete. The working relationship brought such superstars as Abdullah the Butcher, the Invaders and Hercules Ayala to the New England Area. Angelo Savoldi’s grandson ”Jumping” Joe Savoldi won the WWC Tag-Team Championship alongside Al Perez (known as the New York Rockers) on January 6, 1985 when they beat Super Medico I and Black Gorman. During that period, these matches were shown on ICW television with Gordon Solie providing voice-over commentary to the taped matches.

Sometime in 1985 the working relation between ICW and WWC ended, which led to ICW creating both a Heavyweight and a tag-team title with their own names on them in 1985-86. These matches were initially taped in what appeared to be a high school gymnasium, with Lou Thesz and Les Thatcher providing color commentary. ICW next worked out another working relationship with Championship Wrestling from Florida which saw several Florida stars come to ICW such as Kevin Sullivan (who also acted as a booker for ICW) as well as top stars Blackjack Mulligan, Mark Lewin, Austin Idol and Bruiser Brody. ICW also had a history of working with the American Wrestling Association, promoting joint cards in New England as well as AWA talent appearing on ICW shows from time to time.

The ICW would expand beyond New England and produced cards in New Jersey, Pennsylvania and New York State. In the late 1980s and early 1990s, ICW cards occurred in towns like Harrisburgh, Middletown and Monticello, New York. This model was differentiated ICW from other regional federations, in that ICW was a very large territory that didn't have one town or city to act as its local base. So while the company had a presence in a wide area, it never got that strong local following of World Class, the PNW or the USWA.

Over the years ICW established a kind of “open door” policy, working with any federation or any individual competitor who was interested in working in the federation; this open door policy even saw the Japanese Frontier Martial-Arts Wrestling Brass Knuckles Champion Atsushi Onita challenge the ICW Heavyweight champion Tony Atlas to a Title Vs Title Match. Onita lost the match by Disqualification to keep the titles separate.

Around 1989–90 ICW began using more “kid oriented” gimmicks like “Super Duper Mario” (a wrestling version of Super Mario) as well as Curly Moe, the Equalizers: Zip, Zap and Zoom and even had a “Teen Report” segment hosted by kids.

Paul E. Dangerously, after being fired from WCW, went to work for the company as a writer, but was fired on his first day in the middle of his first TV taping.

=== IWCCW: 1991−1995 ===
In 1991, the promotion entered into a working agreement with Kevin Von Erich to use the World Class Championship Wrestling name. Von Erich had sold the WCCW territory to Jerry Jarrett and Jerry Lawler in 1989 but retained the rights to the World Class name (which is why Jarrett and Lawler created the United States Wrestling Association). Since there was no real “home promotion” of WCCW the “merger” was only really felt in ICW and mainly as a way to re-brand the federation so that it did not have the same name as Angelo Poffo’s old ICW territory. Due to this working agreement, ICW changed the name of the promotion to International World Class Championship Wrestling (IWCCW), using the same opening sequence as WCCW did in the 1980s, with Earth from the Apollo 16 mission in the background.

Kevin Von Erich had won the WCCW Texas Title and appeared in several promos with the belt to announce the merger of the two federations. Kevin was billed as the “World Class” champion. The idea was that down the road the two champions (Tony Atlas and Kevin Von Erich) would meet to create an IWCCW title. Kevin appeared a couple of times in New England, wrestling at 2 or 3 TV tapings. He participated in a memorable interview with wrestler Tony Rumble, aka The Boston Bad Boy. During that interview, Rumble berated the Von Erichs, and Kevin in return ran Rumble out of the studio when he signalled for the iron claw. Another World Class mainstay, Chris Adams, was to have been a part of IWCCW, but was not able to join the federation due to his legal troubles. After a short while Kevin Von Erich returned to Texas, effectively ending any plans to merge the two titles, but the name was kept. The IWCCW name lasted until the promotion closed down in 1995.

A video series, All Star American Wrestling' was released during 1992 and 1993 which featured matches from IWCCW. In early 1993 however, many of its longtime veterans left the promotion to join the newly formed Century Wrestling Alliance (the present day NWA Cold Front) promoted by former manager and booker Tony Rumble. Among those jumping to Rumble's promotion included then Heavyweight Champion Tony Atlas, Light heavyweight champion Joe Savoldi and Tag Team champions the Billion Dollar Babies, leaving many of its titles vacant. IWCCW began to decline as its events were held irregularly throughout 1994 and early 1995. Despite a short lived revival in 1995 that saw former WWF stars such as Tito Santana and Koko B. Ware hold the IWCCW title, the promotion folded in the latter part of 1995.

Mario Savoldi kept promoting cards in the New England area after the demise of ICW/IWCCW. In 1999 Savoldi was involved in a promotion called Ultimate Professional Wrestling (not to be mistaken for Ultimate Pro Wrestling) which continued IWCCW’s tradition of mixing current wrestling with classic matches on their TV shows. UPW's website claims to be a direct continuation of ICW.

=== Television ===
Despite being a small promotion that mainly toured in the New England area ICW/IWCCW had a nationally syndicated show from its inception. The show, simply called International Championship Wrestling was even seen on Satellite channels in the United Kingdom. The ICW shows usually featured a combination of original ICW/IWCCW footage and repeats of footage from other territories such as WWC, Florida Wrestling, Memphis, the National Wrestling Alliance and vintage footage of the World Wrestling Federation. During its existence, the first over-the-air video music channel V66 added the syndicated show to daily rotation Monday through Friday at 7pm. From around 1990 and on ICW Television often repeated old ICW matches, sometimes presenting them as brand new, other times repeating the same match for weeks in a row – Vic Steamboat’s title victory over Tony Atlas and Joe Savoldi beating the Tasmaniac for the IWCCW Lightheavyweight title were two of the matches that were shown repeatedly.

IWCCW’s “Revolving door” policy often meant that events would be hyped on Television, but never actually happened in real life, the best example of this was an angle between ”Ravishing” Rick Rude and The Honky Tonk Man over who was the best Intercontinental Champion of all time. Vignettes were aired for months on end, but neither Rude nor the Honky Tonk Man ever worked in an ICW ring to settle the issue. However, after quite a number of years, the owners of the IWCCW footage released this very match, long rumored to have never taken place, via their streaming service called Ultimate Classic Wrestling Network

In addition to its television series, IWCCW owns the rights to WCCW footage produced following its buyout by promoter Jerry Jarrett in 1988 and includes the video libraries of USWA Dallas, Wild West Wrestling and the Global Wrestling Federation, and IWCCW remains one of the few North American regional promotions whose collection is not owned by the World Wrestling Entertainment video library. During the late 1990s, the Savoldi family released several low cost DVD series including Classic Superstars of Wrestling which includes early matches from Steve Austin, Mick Foley and Booker T.

== Stars of the future ==
IWCCW gave many future superstars their first breaks in wrestling and their first television exposure. The federation was in many ways the breeding ground for future Eastern Championship Wrestling (later “Extreme Championship Wrestling”) performers due to the fact that Paul Heyman worked for the company as head booker in late 1989 and early 1990 and got to know quite a few of the people involved, such as Rocco Rock and Johnny Grunge who both competed in IWCCW under different gimmicks. Rocco Rock was a masked high flier known as “The Cheetah Kid” while Johnny Grunge worked both as “Johnny Rotten” and “Equalizer Zap”. Heyman would repackage both men as The Public Enemy.

Peter Senerchia, a former IWCCW Light Heavyweight Champion who had been wrestling in the promotion as The Tasmaniac, agreed to appear at an IWCCW taping in Worcester, Massachusetts in 1990. However, after a disagreement between him and promoters Mario and Tom Savoldi, he left the promotion and eventually began competing in Eastern Championship Wrestling during the early 1990s.

Val Puccio had a brief run in ECW as “Big” Val Puccio. Dudley Family member Dances with Dudley worked in IWCCW as a member of the “Sioux War Party” known as Dancing Wolf. Another Dudley Family member, Big Dick Dudley, also worked in IWCCW under the gimmick “Alexander the Great”

IWCCW mainstay Mondo Kleen is one of the few stars to be signed by the World Wrestling Federation directly. Mondo was repackaged as "Damien Demento” in the WWF.

Another ECW star who got his start in IWCCW was Tommy Dreamer who briefly was the promotion's World Champion. This led to a very awkward moment for Dreamer who was briefly working as a pizza deliveryman. According to Dreamer (interviewed in WWE Magazine), he delivered some food to a person's house, who just so happened to be watching Dreamer win the IWCCW title on TV at the same time. Dreamer had to very quickly assert that he wasn't, in fact, himself, so as not to break kayfabe.

== Former personnel ==
see List of former International World Class Championship Wrestling personnel

== Championships ==
- WWC Universal Heavyweight Championship (1984–1985)
- WWC World Tag Team Championship (1984–1985)
- IWCCW Heavyweight Championship
- IWCCW Light Heavyweight Championship
- IWCCW Tag Team Championship
- IWCCW Women's Championship
- IWCCW Television Championship
