= Tommy Taylor (wrestler) =

Personal information
- Born: Steven Taylor; 25 January 1986 (age 40) Leeds, England

Professional wrestling career
- Ring name(s): Mr Attitude; Steve Taylor; Taylor Phoenix; Tommy Pride; Tommy Taylor
- Billed height: 5 ft 11 in (1.80 m)
- Billed weight: 225 lb (102 kg)
- Billed from: Leeds, England
- Trained by: Jeff Kaye; Tom Prichard; Steve Keirn; Drew McDonald
- Debut: 2003

Steven Taylor (born 25 January 1986) is an English professional wrestler currently competing on the independent circuit. He is also known for working in WWE's developmental territories Florida Championship Wrestling under the ring name Tommy Taylor.

== Professional wrestling career ==
=== United Kingdom ===
Taylor started training at Jeff Kaye's Wrestling School in Leeds, England in May 2002, with his first professional match taking place on 24 January 2003. Working for promotions such as All Star Wrestling, Orig Williams Promotions and Premier Promotions, he would continue to tour the United Kingdom and the rest of Europe, often facing long time rival and eventual tag team partner Chris Gray. In November 2005, Taylor wrestled two tryout matches for WWE during a tour of the UK, losing to Carlito and Simon Dean on Sunday night Heat.

=== United States ===
On 16 April 2007 Taylor signed a WWE developmental contract with Florida Championship Wrestling, winning his debut match where he teamed with Robert Anthony against Shawn Osborne and Chris Gray. He would go on to have a number of singles matches throughout the rest of the year and into 2008, before forming a tag team with Gray called the British Lions to try to capture the Florida Tag Team Championship. On 22 April 2008 Taylor was released from his contract.

In August, Taylor and Gray made their debut for Full Impact Pro wrestling with a loss to Rex Sterling and Damien Wayne. This led to a long-running feud which would continue through the rest of the year, with both teams trading victories. On 3 October, at Fallout 2009, Taylor and Gray would defeat Erick Stevens and Roderick Strong to win the FIP Tag Team Championship. They would hold the title for just over 300 days before losing it to The Dark City Fight Club (Jon Davis and Kory Chavis) on 31 July 2010.

After some time away from the ring, Taylor would return to FIP on 1 February 2013, defeating Johnny Vandal in a match. Over the next few weeks he would go on form a tag team with Kenneth Cameron to aid him in his feud with The Scene.

On 14 November 2013 Kenneth and Taylor debuted in Ring Warriors but they were defeated by Los Ben Dejos. On 25 November 2013 Taylor had a shot for the Ring Warriors Bahamian Championship, but he was defeated by Alex Chamberlain.

== Championship and accomplishments ==
- Full Impact Pro
  - FIP Tag Team Championship (1 time) - with Chris Gray
- Go Wrestle
  - GW Speedweight Championship (1 time)
- Midlands Wrestling
  - Midlands Wrestling Tag Team Championship (1 time) - with Chris Gray
- NWA Florida
  - NWA Florida Heavyweight Championship (1 time)
  - NWA Florida Tag Team Championship (1 time) - with Andreas Rossi
- Ultimate Championship Wrestling
  - UCW Tag Team Championship (1 time) - with Chris Gray

Winner of rear of the year 2007
