= The Skulk =

Professional wrestling tag team

(The) Skulk
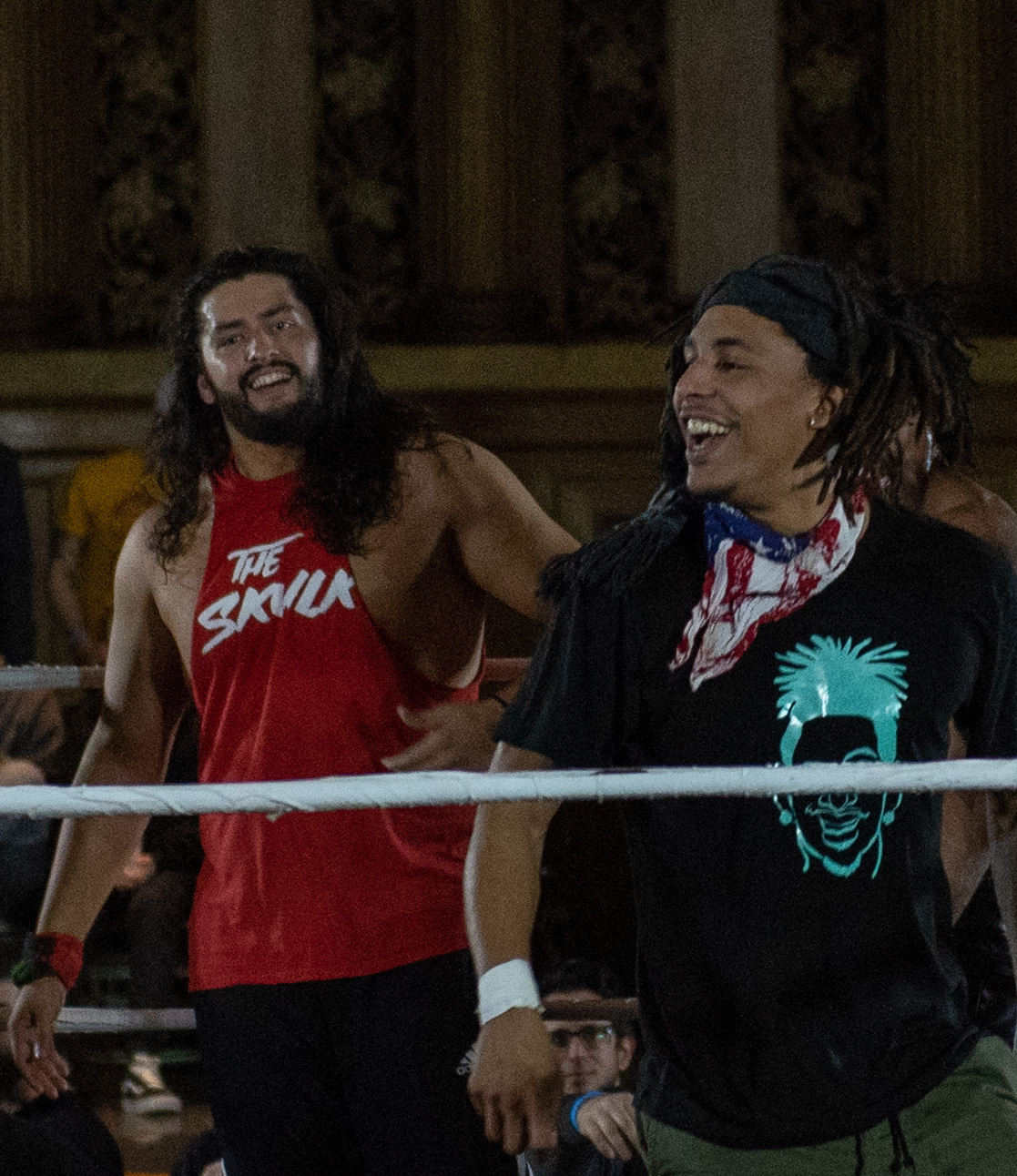
- Adrian Alanis (left) and Liam Gray (right) in March 2019

Tag team
- Members: Adrian Alanis; Liam Gray
- Name: (The) Skulk
- Billed from: Atlanta, Georgia, United States
- Former members: A. R. Fox; Leon Ruff; Tommy Maserati
- Debut: May 27, 2018
- Years active: 2018–present
- Trained by: A. R. Fox

(The) Skulk is an American professional wrestling tag team composed of Adrian Alanis (born Anthony Alanis on August 17, 1996) and Liam Gray. They are best known for their work in various promotion of the American independent scene such as Full Impact Pro (FIP), All Elite Wrestling (AEW), World Wrestling Network (WWN) and Evolve.

== Professional wrestling career ==
=== American independent circuit (2018–present) ===
The Skulk originally debuted under a namesake stable banner which consisted of Adrian Alanis, Liam Gray, Leon Ruff and Tommy Maserati. They made their debut at Beyond All Day, and event promoted by Beyond Wrestling on May 27, 2018, where they fell short to Team Pazuzu (Chris Dickinson, Jaka, Ortiz and Santana) in eight-man tag team competition.

At CZW 21st Anniversary, an event promoted by Combat Zone Wrestling on February 8, 2020, Alanis and Gray unsuccessfully challenged The REP (Dave McCall and Nate Carter) for the CZW World Tag Team Championship.

Alanis and Gray made their All Elite Wrestling debut at AEW Dark #86 on April 27, 2021, where they fell short to SoCal Uncensored (Christopher Daniels and Frankie Kazarian). At AEW Collision #37 on March 9, 2024, Alanis and Gray teamed up with Jon Cruz in a losing effort against The Elite (Kazuchika Okada, Matthew Jackson and Nicholas Jackson).

=== Evolve/World Wrestling Network and WWE (2018–2021) ===
The Skulk competed under the stable incarnation of Alanis, Gray, Ruff, Fox and Maserati in the Evolve/World Wrestling Network tandem for roughly three years. They made their debut at Evolve 106 on June 23, 2018, where they defeated Leon Ruff and Tommy Maserati in tag team competition. At Evolve 129 on June 29, 2019, they unsuccessfully challenged Milk Chocolate (Brandon Watts and Randy Summers) in a number of one contenders hip match for the Evolve Tag Team Championship. At the last episode of WWNLive Mercury Rising from April 5, 2019, Alanis, Fox and Ruff fell short to Damnation (Daisuke Sasaki, Soma Takao and Tetsuya Endo) in six-man tag team competition.

Due to Evolve and WWN acting as developmental grounds for WWE, Alanis, Gray and Leon Ruff made several appearances in the NXT brand. Alanis and Ruff made their first appearance at WWE NXT #502 on December 4, 2019, where they fell short to The Forgotten Sons (Steve Cutler and Wesley Blake).

Alanis made his debut during the 2023 WWE Draft episode of Monday Night Raw from May 1, 2023, under the ring name of "Anthony Alanis", falling short to Omos in singles competition.

=== Full Impact Pro (2018–2022) ===
Alanis and Gray are best known for their tenure with Full Impact Pro. They won the FIP World Tag Team Championship at In Full Force on November 1, 2019, by defeating The Precipice (Chance Auren and Omar Amir). They dropped the titles after a 744-day long reign to The Island Kings (Jaka and Sean Maluta) at WWN Supershow: Battle Of The Belts on November 14, 2021, in a four-way match, also including OAO (Hunter Law and Snoop Strikes) and The NYC Crew (Nino Cruz and Steve Pena).

== Championships and accomplishments ==
- ACTION Wrestling
  - ACTION Tag Team Championship (1 time)
- Full Impact Pro
  - FIP World Tag Team Championship (1 time)
- Southern Honor Wrestling
  - SHW Tag Team Championship (1 time)
