= Dark City Fight Club =

Professional wrestling tag team

Tag team
- Members: Jon Davis; Kory Chavis
- Name: Dark Fight Club
- Billed from: The Dark City
- Former members: Mia Yim
- Debut: March 2008
- Years active: 2008-present

The Dark City Fight Club are a professional wrestling tag team consisting of Jon Davis and Kory Chavis.

== History ==
In March 2008, Jon Davis teamed with up Kory Chavis as The Dark City Fight Club (DCFC) in Full Impact Pro (FIP). They were revealed as a team on March 22, when they defeated Shayne Swift and Myles Long, and were revealed to have been the masked team that had attacked the Black Market tag team. The following month DCFC faced Black Market in a match that ended in a no contest when DCFC poured gasoline onto Black Market member Joey Machete and threatened to set him on fire. In an Anything Goes match in May, DCFC defeated Black Market, which was followed by Black Market's Shawn Murphy defeating Davis via disqualification and Machete defeating Chavis in a No Disqualification match on July 19. The following month at Heatstroke '08, DCFC defeated Black Market in a weapons match to end the feud. Throughout 2009, DCFC competed sporadically for FIP. On March 28, they defeated Bumz R' Us in a street fight. At the first night of the Jeff Peterson Memorial Cup on November 20, they competed in a 'tag team rumble', which was won by Bumz R' Us. In 2010 DCFC moved into FIP Tag Team Championship contention. They faced the champions, The British Lions and The Irish Airborne in a three-way match for the championship on June 26, but were unsuccessful. On July 31, 2010, DCFC won the FIP Tag Team Championship in Crystal River, Florida by defeating The British Lions.

On January 16, 2010, DCFC made their debut for the Evolve promotion, by defeating Aeroform (Flip Kendrick and Louis Lyndon). They also compete for Pro Wrestling Fusion, where they won the NWA Florida Tag Team Championship on August 22, 2009 by defeating Dagon and Sinn Bodhi for the vacant championship. They held the championship for 225 days, successfully defending it against The Network, Bumz R' Us, and The Poppers, before losing it to The New Heavenly Bodies (Chris Nelson and Vito DeNucci) on April 4, 2010. They regained the championship from The New Heavenly Bodies on April 16, 2010. On November 20, 2010, the Dark City Fight Club defeated Rasche Brown and Keith Walker to win the NWA World Tag Team Championship for the first time. With the win, the Dark City Fight Club vacated the NWA Florida tag title. They would lose the title to the Usual Suspects (A.J. Steele and Murder One) on May 1, 2011. They would regain the title two weeks later on May 15. Davis did not participate in the match where the Dark City Fight Club lost the titles, in San Antonio, TX on December 15, 2012. Lance Hoyt filled in for Davis, as the Dark City Fight Club had stopped taking bookings together earlier in 2012.

=== Ring of Honor (2009–2010) ===
On February 6, 2009, Davis and Chavis made their Ring of Honor debut at Proving Ground 2009: Night 1. They appeared at the Ring of Honor Wrestling television tapings on March 1, where they defeated Grizzly Redwood and Andy Ridge in a squash match. On April 24, Davis dislocated his wrist during a tag team match. He suffered four dislocated bones and "destroyed ligaments and tendons" in his left wrist, and underwent surgery for the injury during the first week of May. DCFC returned as a team at the Ring of Honor Wrestling tapings in August. At the November 5 television tapings, DCFC fought the Briscoe Brothers to a no contest.

At the January 8, 2010, tapings of Ring of Honor Wrestling DCFC squashed the Bravado Brothers (Harlem and Lance), and at the tapings the following night they defeated the former ROH World Tag Team Champions The American Wolves (Davey Richards and Eddie Edwards). They challenged the Briscoe Brothers for the ROH World Tag Team Championship at ROH's Eight Anniversary Show in New York City on February 13, but were unsuccessful. At the March 6, 2010 tapings, they won a squash match, before they lost to the Briscoes. At the tapings themselves, the match was billed as a non-title match, but by the time the match aired on May 10, the Briscoes had lost the Tag Team Championship, and the match was instead billed as a number one contender's match. On the July 5 episode of Ring of Honor Wrestling, DCFC defeated The Kings of Wrestling (Chris Hero and Claudio Castagnoli) via disqualification when the Briscoes interfered.

In July 2010, ROH announced the teams that would be participating in the Tag Wars tournament, to determine three teams which would challenge the Kings of Wrestling in the final Ultimate Endurance match. Chavis and Davis faced and defeated The Embassy team of Shawn Daivari and Ernesto Osiris in the first round and defeated the Bravado Brothers in the semi-finals on August 27. The following night, on August 28, DCFC faced the Kings of Wrestling, The All Night Express (Kenny King and Rhett Titus) and The Briscoe Brothers in the Ultimate Endurance match, but were unsuccessful as the Kings of Wrestling won the match to retain the ROH World Tag Team Championship and win Tag Wars.

=== Dragon Gate USA and Evolve Wrestling (2011–2012) ===
On April 3, 2011, at Open the Ultimate Gate, the Dark City Fight Club was presented as Dragon Gate USA's newest tag team. In their first match in the promotion, Davis and Chavis were defeated by the Dirty Ugly Fucks (Arik Cannon and Sami Callihan).

Davis won the EVOLVE 2012 Style Battle Round-Robin Tournament by defeating A. R. Fox, Tommy Taylor, and Bobby Fish over 3 nights June 28–30 in Ybor City, St. Petersburg, and Jacksonville, FL.

== Championships and accomplishments ==
- Full Impact Pro
  - FIP Tag Team Championship (1 time)
- National Wrestling Alliance
  - NWA World Tag Team Championship (2 times)
- Pro Wrestling Fusion
  - NWA Florida Tag Team Championship (2 times)
  - PWF Tag Team Championship (1 time)
- United States Wrestling Alliance
  - USWA Tag Team Championship (2 times)
