= Amy Vitale =

American model, actress, and wrestling valet

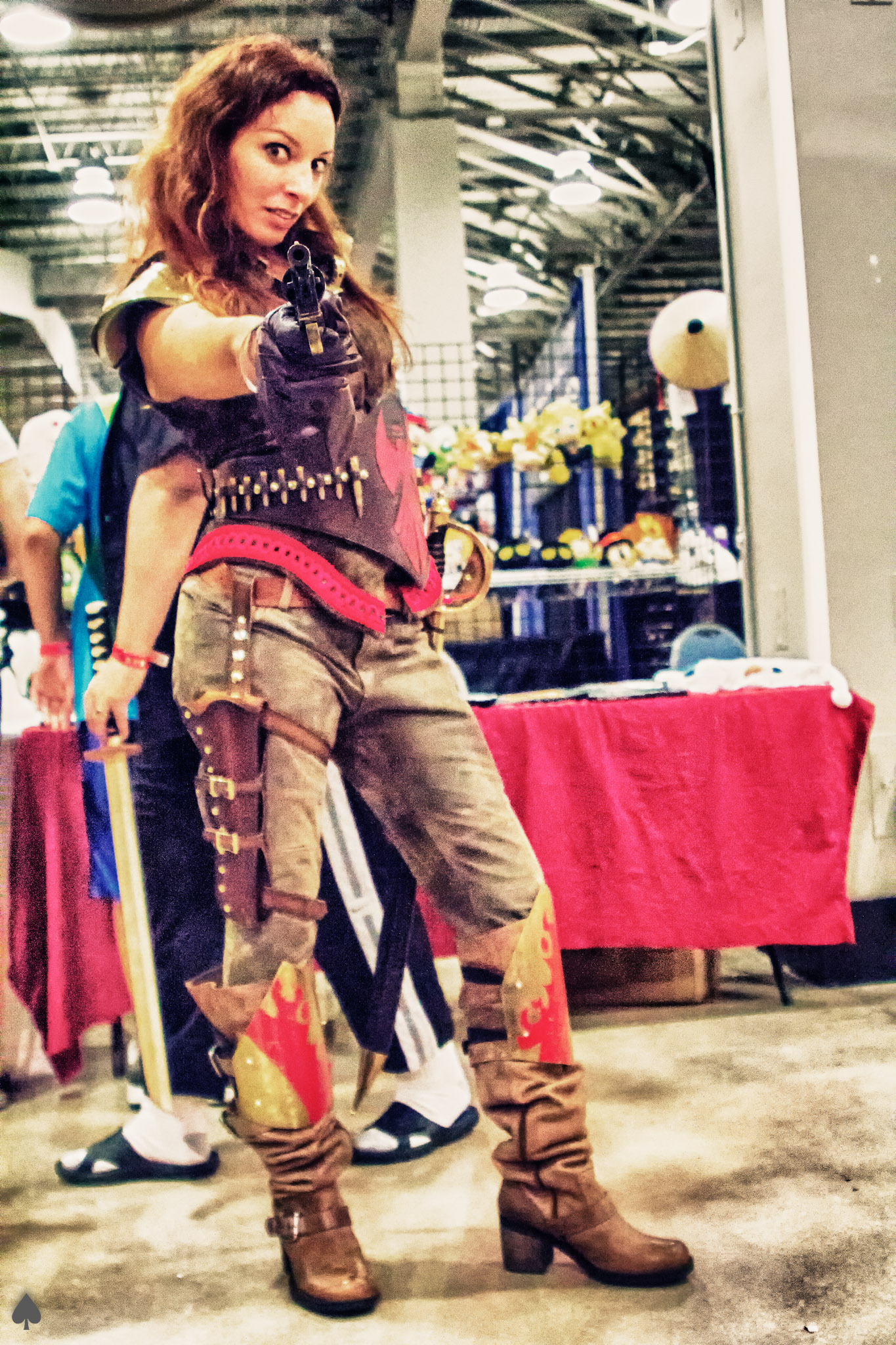
- Amy Vitale in 2012

Personal information
- Born: June 12, 1977 (age 49) Tampa, Florida, United States

Professional wrestling career
- Ring name(s): Amy Vitale; Ms. Amy
- Billed height: 5 ft 6 in (1.68 m)
- Billed weight: 118 lb (54 kg)
- Debut: 1995

Amy Vitale (born June 12, 1977) is an American model, actress, and professional wrestling manager/valet, best known under her nickname "The Italian Princess of Wrestling". She works for such promotions as the Sunshine Wrestling Federation, Future of Wrestling, Full Impact Pro, Florida Championship Wrestling, the Independent Professional Wrestling Association and the National Wrestling Alliance. She has managed a number of professional wrestlers on the Florida independent circuit including Francisco Ciatso, Jerry Lynn, New Jack, Alex Porteau and The Heartbreak Express. Vitale has been profiled in Pro Wrestling Illustrated and Wrestling World Magazine on several occasions, as well as Fighting Females Magazine; she has been voted as "Florida Woman of the Year" three years in a row, and "Pro Wrestling Manager of the Year" two years in a row.

Vitale has also had a successful modeling and acting career. She has appeared in the movie There's Something About Mary, USA Network Series Burn Notice, and on CW Network's The Daily Buzz. Vitale is also portrayed in the Red Skye Comics series Aurora Stone, Red Angel for What the Flux Comics! and is the lead female model for Black Art Beer. In 2009, she was featured by Fox News for her work as a spokesmodel for "Patriot Girls for the Troops", a group that raises money for American servicemen through posing for military-themed merchandise such as calendars and photos as well as holding charity car washes.

== Professional wrestling career ==
Born in Tampa, Florida, Amy Vitale grew up as an instant fan the moment her grandfather introduced her to professional wrestling. Seeing wrestling divas like Miss Elizabeth, Missy Hyatt, and Woman greatly inspired her to become like them; a strong, sexy, and confident woman. After watching her first wrestling show and seeing how the wrestlers interacted with their fans, Vitale knew that's what she wanted to do.

In her teenage years, she started writing for wrestling newsletters and even started her own for a while. She was on wrestling hotlines giving news and feedback on the wrestling universe, then venturing on to managing her high school wrestling team as a senior. She officially debuted her wrestling career at Sunshine Wrestling Federation in Florida in 1995, then at Future of Wrestling She later publicly fired one of her charges, "Playboy" Bobby Davis, leaving for Florida Championship Wrestling and resulting in a promotional dispute between the two promotions.

Under her in-ring persona as "The Italian Princess of Wrestling", a spoiled "Mafia princess" (somewhat modeled after Victoria Gotti and Paris Hilton), Vitale eventually established herself as one of the top managers on the Florida independent circuit by the late 1990s. She has worked in numerous promotions since then, such as AWA World 1 South, Florida Championship Wrestling, Full Impact Pro, the Independent Professional Wrestling Association, and Pro Wrestling Riot, and has made appearances outside Florida with the National Wrestling Alliance traveling as far as NWA New York where she feuded with Rick O'Brian hoping to take his position as NWA New York Commissioner.

On August 26, 2005, Vitale made her debut in Pro Wrestling Warfare as the manager of Chasyn Rance, and later added Tom Lawlor & J.P. Ace to her stable; she led the two men to victory over Buck Quartermaine & Lex Lovett on March 11, 2006. A year later, she started managing The Heartbreak Express in AWA World 1 South and took them to the finals of the $10,000 Old School Tag Tournament in March 2007, and the Jeff Peterson Memorial Cup in November 2009.

Vitale has been profiled Lords Of The Ring, The Wrestling Hotseat, Pro Wrestling Illustrated and Wrestling World Magazine on several occasions, as well as Fighting Females Magazine. She was named as the #2 manager/valet in Florida wrestling in 1998, and has been voted as "Florida Woman of the Year" three years in a row, "Pro Wrestling Manager of the Year" two years in a row, and Pro Wrestling Digest's "Babe of the Day" multiple times.

== Modeling and acting ==
Amy Vitale begun her modeling career after being noticed by a photographer at the sprite age of 16 and began doing catalog work for local clothing companies and appearing in commercials and music videos. She is not the first in her family to model. One of her aunts were a swimsuit model, while the other is Karen Velez, the 1985 Playboy Playmate of the Year, who is also known to have been married to actor, Lee Majors. In the April 2010 edition of Playboy Magazine, Amy appeared in the publication as a "Featured Celebrity Commentator" for her pick as "My Favorite Playmate".

Vitale is also a fitness model and made fitness a primary factor in her life after her mother died from breast cancer and her younger sister died from a very rare form of Sarcoma. She says that after her younger sister died, she became dedicated to her health and fitness. On October 16, 2010, Vitale participated in the American Cancer Society's "Making Strides against Breast Cancer of Martin County Walk" at Flagler Park in Stuart, Florida. With "The Dazzling Diamonds", they helped raise money in their walk for the event.

== Current projects ==
Although Amy Vitale left wrestling in 2012 she still continues her modeling and acting career. On March 6, 2010, Vitale and Francisco Ciatso appeared at a show for NWA Pro Wrestling Fusion in which Ciatso defeated The Saint. More recently, she has had a significant role in an independent film called Planeta Desconocido.

“Planeta Desconocido”, directed by Troy Bernier and Eric Swain, is about a research crew being trapped on a distant moon by an outbreak of war. The movie was released in 25 film festivals across the nation early in the 1st quarter of 2011.
