= FIP World Tag Team Championship =

Professional wrestling tag team championship

Details
- Promotion: Full Impact Pro
- Date established: April 22, 2005
- Current champions: Annihiliation (Chungus and Syther)
- Date won: December 14, 2025
Statistics
- First champions: Eddie Vegas and Jimmy Rave
- Most reigns: As Tag Team (3 reigns): Annihilation; As Individual (3 reigns): Chungus; Syther
- Longest reign: The Hooligans (Devin Cutter and Mason Cutter) (910 days)
- Shortest reign: Sal Rinauro and Spanky (27 days)
- Oldest champion: Roderick Strong (30 years)
- Youngest champion: Mark Briscoe (21 years old, 260 days)

The FIP World Tag Team Championship is a professional wrestling world tag team championship owned by the independent professional wrestling promotion Full Impact Pro (FIP). It was created and debuted on April 22, 2005, at FIP's The Usual Suspects event.

== History ==
One-half of the inaugural champions Jimmy Rave.

On April 22, 2005 at The Usual Suspects as the DP Associates Eddie Vegas and Jimmy Rave became the inaugural champions after defeating the teams of (Roderick Strong & Jerrelle Clark) and (CM Punk & Don Juan) in a three-way tag team elimination match in the tournament finals.

== Reigns ==
As of 20 March 2026, there have been 26 reigns between 23 teams composed of 45 individual champions. The inaugural champions were DP Associates (Eddie Vegas and Jimmy Rave). At 910 days, The Hooligans (Devin Cutter and Mason Cutter) hold the record for the longest reign in the title's history. Sal Rinauro's and Spanky's reign holds the record for the shortest reign in the title's history at 27 days.

Annihilation (Chungus and Syther) are the current champions in their record-setting third reign as a team and individual. They won the titles by defeating The Emerald Empire (Devin Diaz and Jonathan Hudson) on December 14, 2025 at WWN Supershow: Battle Of The Belts in Clearwater, FL.

Key
No.	Overall reign number
Reign	Reign number for the specific team—reign numbers for the individuals are in parentheses, if different
Days	Number of days held
+	Current reign is changing daily

No.	Champion	Championship change			Reign statistics		Notes	Ref.
No.	Champion	Date	Event	Location	Reign	Days	Notes	Ref.
World Wrestling Network (WWNLive): Full Impact Pro (FIP) and Independent circuit
1	DP Associates (Eddie Vegas and Jimmy Rave)	April 22, 2005	The Usual Suspects	Brandon, FL	1	106	Defeated the teams of (Roderick Strong & Jerrelle Clark) and (CM Punk & Don Juan) in a three-way tag team elimination match in the tournament final to become the inaugural champions.	
2	Sal Rinauro and Spanky	August 6, 2005	Heatstroke: Night Two	Bushnell, FL	1	27		
3	The Heartbreak Express (Phil Davis and Sean Davis)	September 2, 2005	Big Year One Bash: Night One	Arcadia, FL	1	267		
4	The Black Market (Joey Machete and Shawn Murphy)	May 27, 2006	FIP	Crystal River, FL	1	105		
5	The Heartbreak Express (Phil Davis and Sean Davis)	September 9, 2006	Second Year Spectacular: Night Two	Arcadia, FL	2	35		
6	The Briscoe Brothers (Jay Briscoe and Mark Briscoe)	October 14, 2006	Southern Justice	Brandon, FL	1	391		
7	The YRR (Jason Blade and Kenny King)	November 9, 2007	Unstoppable	Crystal River, FL	1	407		
8	Erick Stevens and Roderick Strong	December 20, 2008	Unstoppable	Crystal River, FL	1	287		
9	The British Lions (Chris Gray and Tommy Taylor)	October 3, 2009	Fallout	Crystal River, FL	1	301	This was a steel cage match.	
10	The Dark City Fight Club (Jon Davis and Kory Chavis)	July 31, 2010	Cage of Pain III	Crystal River, FL	1	454		
11	The Scene (Caleb Konley and Scott Reed)	October 28, 2011	Jeff Peterson Memorial Cup: Night 1	Brooksville, FL	1	462		
12	Dos Ben Dejos (Eddie Cruz and Jay Rios)	February 1, 2013	Everything Burns	Tampa, FL	1	154		
13	The Bravado Brothers (Harlem Bravado and Lance Bravado)	July 5, 2013	Declaration of Independence	Ybor City, FL	1	154	This was a three-way match, which also involving KOA (Aaron Epic and Sugar Dunkerton).	
14	Rich Swann and Roderick Strong (2)	December 6, 2013	In Full Force	Ybor City, FL	1	147		
15	The Juicy Product (David Starr and J. T. Dunn)	May 2, 2014	Establish Dominance	Ybor City, FL	1	253		
16	Savages (Eddie Graves and Teddy Stigma)	January 10, 2015	Everything Burns	Winter Park, FL	1	209		
17	The Hooligans (Devin Cutter and Mason Cutter)	August 7, 2015	Heatstroke	Ybor City, FL	1	910	This was a no disqualification match.	
18	The End (Odinson and Parrow)	February 2, 2018	Everything Burns	Ybor City, FL	1	394		
19	The Precipice (Chance Auren and Omar Amir)	March 3, 2019	Ascension	Ybor City, FL	1	243		
20	The Skulk (Adrian Alanis and Liam Gray)	November 1, 2019	In Full Force	Ybor City, FL	1	744		
21	The Island Kings (Jaka and Sean Maluta)	November 14, 2021	WWN Supershow: Battle Of The Belts	Clearwater, FL	1	238	This was a four-way match, also including OAO (Hunter Law & Snoop Strikes) and The NYC Crew (Nino Cruz & Steve Pena).	
22	OAO (Hunter Law and Snoop Strikes)	July 10, 2022	In Full Force 2022	Clearwater, FL	1	413		
23	The Metro Brothers (Chris Metro and JC Metro)	August 27, 2023	WWNLive SuperShow - Mercury Rising 2023	Clearwater, FL	1	364	This was a two-out-of-three falls match.	
24	Annihilation (Chungus and Syther)	August 25, 2024	Heatstroke 2024	Clearwater, FL	1	140		
25	The Metro Brothers (Chris Metro and JC Metro)	January 12, 2025	Everything Burns 2025	Clearwater, FL	2	56	This was a street fight.	
26	Annihilation (Chungus and Syther)	March 9, 2025	WWN Supershow: Uprising	Clearwater, FL	2	35	This was a six-man tag team match, where for Annihilation's side was Simon Sez, and on The Metro Brothers' side was Skinny Vinny.	
27	LJ Cleary and Rich Swann (2)	April 13, 2025	Establish Dominance 2025	Clearwater, FL	1	56		
28	The Emerald Empire (Devin Diaz and Jonathan Hudson)	June 8, 2025	WWNLive SuperShow - Mercury Rising 2025	Clearwater, FL	1	189		
29	Annihiliation (Chungus and Syther)	December 14, 2025	WWN Supershow: Battle Of The Belts	Clearwater, FL	3	329+		

== Combined reigns ==
As of 8 November 2026

Key
†	Indicates the current champion

=== By team ===
Rank	Team	No. of reigns	Combined days
1	The Hooligans (Devin Cutter and Mason Cutter)	1	910
2	The Skulk (Adrian Alanis and Liam Gray)	1	744
3	Annihilation (Chungus and Syther) †	3	504+
4	The Scene (Caleb Konley and Scott Reed)	1	462
5	The Dark City Fight Club (Jon Davis and Kory Chavis)	1	454
6	The Metro Brothers (Chris Metro and JC Metro)	2	420
7	OAO (Hunter Law and Snoop Strikes)	1	413
8	The YRR (Jason Blade and Kenny King)	1	407
9	The End (Odinson and Parrow)	1	394
10	The Briscoe Brothers (Jay Briscoe and Mark Briscoe)	1	391
11	The Heartbreak Express (Phil Davis and Sean Davis)	2	302
12	The British Lions (Chris Gray and Tommy Taylor)	1	301
13	Erick Stevens and Roderick Strong	1	287
14	The Juicy Product (David Starr and J. T. Dunn)	1	253
15	The Precipice (Chance Auren and Omar Amir)	1	243
16	The Island Kings (Jaka and Sean Maluta)	1	238
17	Savages (Eddie Graves and Teddy Stigma)	1	209
18	The Emerald Empire (Devin Diaz and Jonathan Hudson)	1	189
19	Dos Ben Dejos (Eddie Cruz and Jay Rios)	1	154
19	The Bravado Brothers (Harlem Bravado and Lance Bravado)	1	154
21	Rich Swann and Roderick Strong	1	147
22	Eddie Vegas and Jimmy Rave	1	106
23	The Black Market (Joey Machete and Shawn Murphy)	1	105
24	LJ Cleary and Rich Swann	1	56
25	Sal Rinauro and Spanky	1	27

=== By wrestler ===
Rank	Wrestler	No. of reigns	Combined days
1	Devin Cutter	1	910
1	Mason Cutter	1	910
3	Adrian Alanis	1	744
3	Liam Gray	1	744
4	Chungus †	3	504+
4	Syther †	3	504+
6	Caleb Konley	1	462
6	Scott Reed	1	462
8	Jon Davis	1	454
8	Kory Chavis	1	454
10	Roderick Strong	2	434
11	Chris Metro	2	420
11	JC Metro	2	420
13	Hunter Law	1	413
13	Snoop Strikes	1	413
15	Jason Blade	1	407
15	Kenny King	1	407
17	Odinson	1	394
17	Parrow	1	394
19	Jay Briscoe	1	391
19	Mark Briscoe	1	391
21	Phil Davis	2	302
21	Sean Davis	2	302
23	Chris Grey	1	301
23	Tommy Taylor	1	301
25	Erick Stevens	1	287
26	David Starr	1	253
26	J. T. Dunn	1	253
28	Chance Auren	1	243
28	Omar Amir	1	243
30	Jaka	1	238
30	Sean Maluta	1	238
32	Eddie Graves	1	209
32	Teddy Stigma	1	209
34	Rich Swann	1	203
35	Devin Diaz	1	189
35	Jonathan Hudson	1	189
37	Eddie Cruz	1	154
37	Harlem Bravado	1	154
37	Jay Rios	1	154
37	Lance Bravado	1	154
42	Eddie Vegas	1	106
42	Jimmy Rave	1	106
44	Joey Machete	1	105
44	Shawn Murphy	1	105
46	LJ Cleary	1	56
47	Sal Rinauro	1	27
47	Spanky	1	27
