= Bravado Brothers =

Professional wrestling tag team

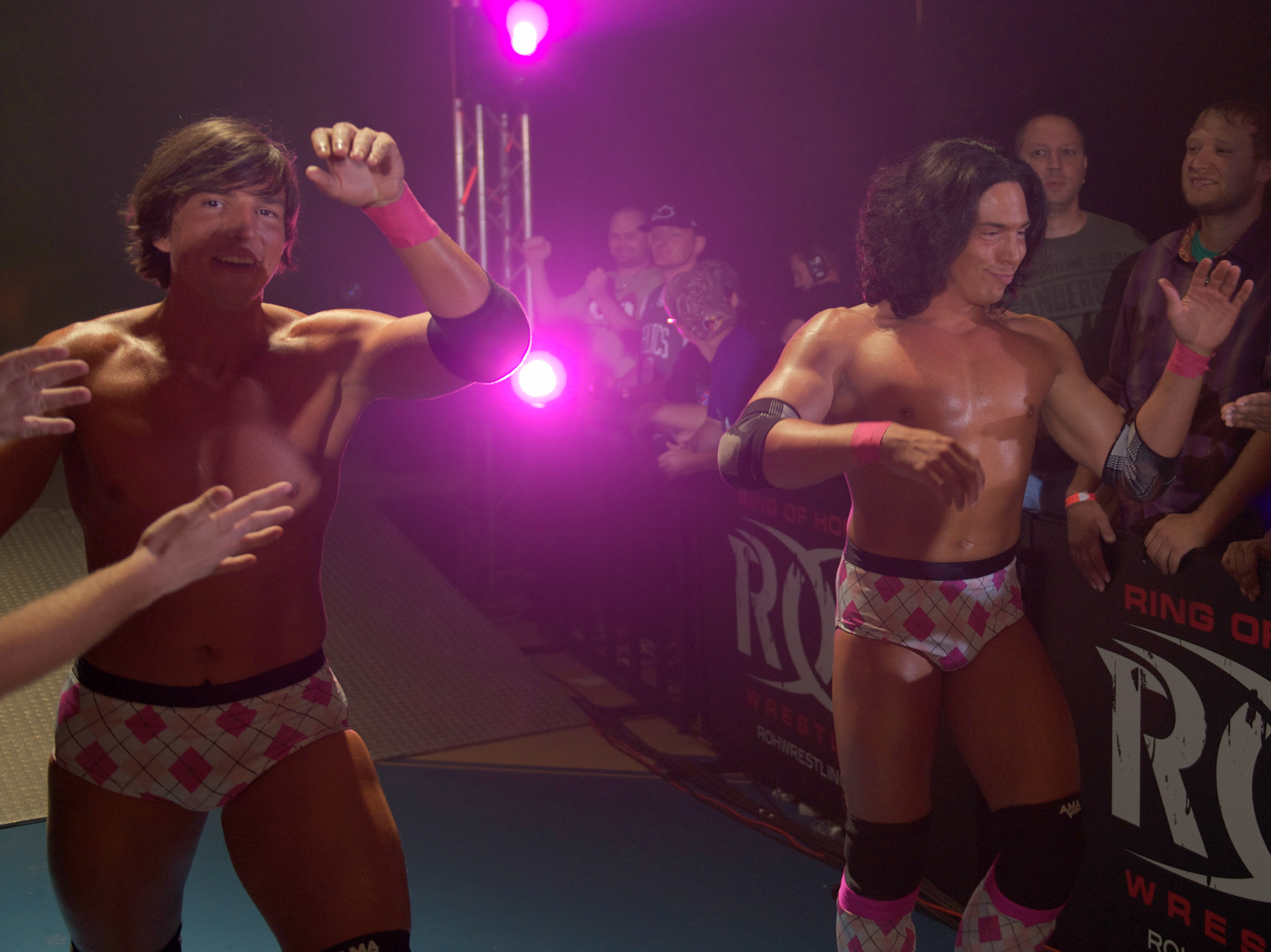
- Harlem (left) and Lance Bravado in 2011

Tag team
- Members: Harlem Bravado; Lance Bravado / Lancelot Bravado
- Name(s): The Bravado Brothers; The Bravados
- Billed heights: Harlem Bravado: 6 ft 02 in (1.88 m); Lancelot Bravado: 5 ft 11 in (1.80 m)
- Combined billed weight: Harlem Bravado: 216 lb (98 kg); Lancelot Bravado: 205 lb (93 kg)
- Hometown: Eden, North Carolina
- Billed from: Draper, North Carolina
- Debut: 2008
- Disbanded: 2017
- Trained by: Delirious

The Bravado Brothers were an American professional wrestling tag team consisting of real-life brothers Harlem Bravado (born Chance Barrow on April 22, 1989) and Lancelot Bravado (born Houston Barrow on September 16, 1985). The duo have worked for several independent promotions, including Ring of Honor, Chikara, and Full Impact Pro, and have also appeared in Japan for Pro Wrestling Noah.

In 2017, Houston retired from wrestling while Chance continued to compete on the independent circuit, mainly for Evolve Wrestling. In February 2021, Chance signed with WWE and performed on NXT regularly under the ring name Andre Chase, before being released April 24, 2026.

== Professional wrestling career ==
=== Ring of Honor (2008–2012) ===
The Bravado Brothers of Harlem Bravado (Chance Barrow, born 1989) and Lancelot Bravado (Houston Barrow, born 1985) trained at Ring of Honor (ROH)'s Wrestling Academy under the tutelage of Delirious in 2008.

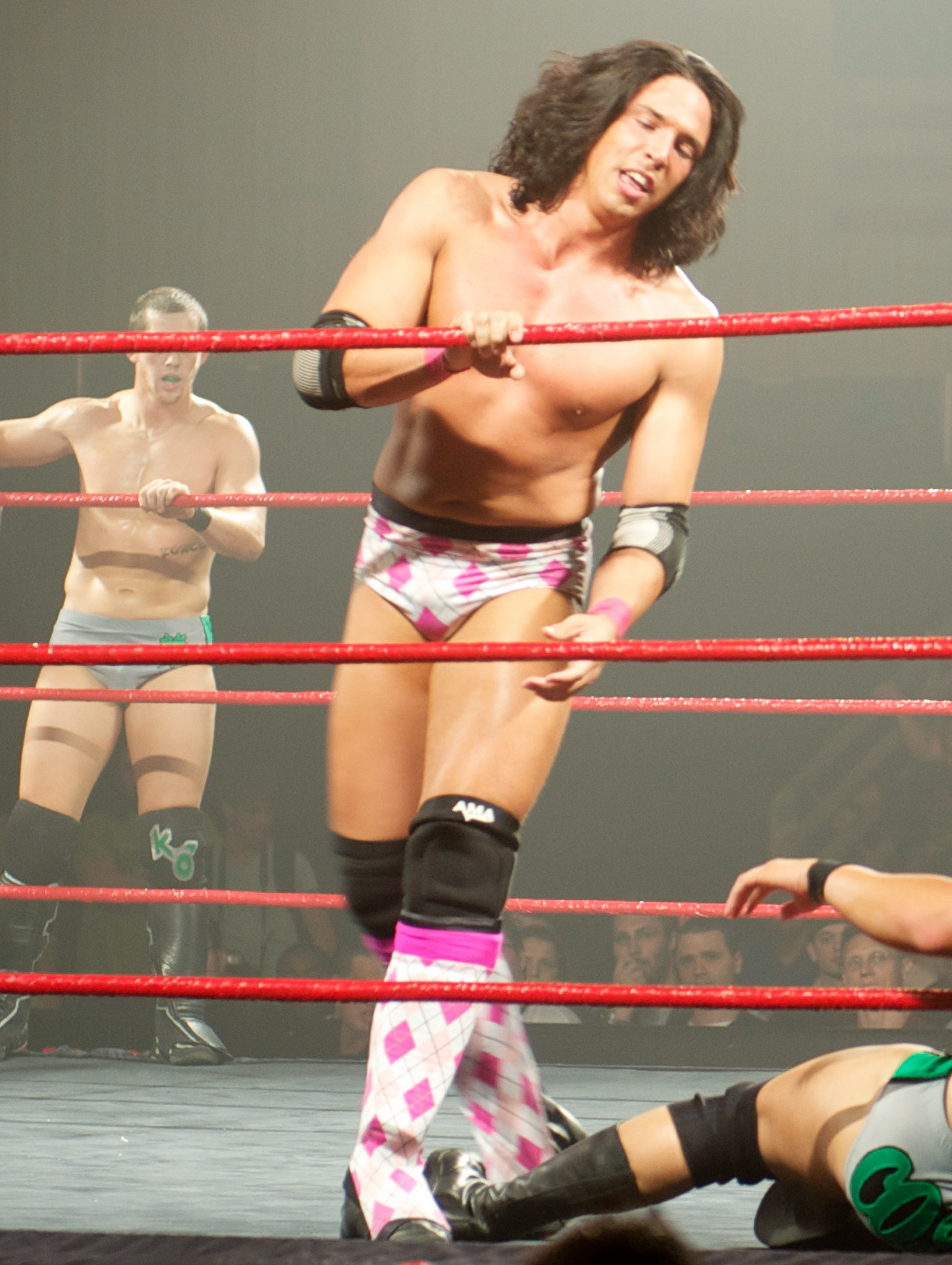
Lance Bravado in the ring in 2011

The duo debuted for ROH in September 2009, and over the next several months they competed in dark matches, facing wrestlers including Tony Kozina and Anthony Nese. Their first match as part of the main roster was at the 8th Anniversary Show, where they were defeated by The Kings of Wrestling (Chris Hero and Claudio Castagnoli). They entered the Tag Wars 2010 tournament, reaching the semi-finals before losing to the Dark City Fight Club of Kory Chavis and Jon Davis. Following losses to teams including Future Shock (Adam Cole and Kyle O'Reilly) and Grizzly Redwood and Andy Ridge, they developed a winning streak beginning in January 2011, which lasted until they were beaten by Future Shock at Supercard of Honor VI on May 21. At Tag Team Turmoil 2011, the Bravados entered the tournament to determine the next challengers to the ROH World Tag Team Championship. They defeated the Briscoe Brothers (Jay and Mark Briscoe), but lost to Future Shock in the final. On September 17, the Bravado Brothers appeared on their first ROH pay-per-view Death Before Dishonor IX, when they were part of a three-way elimination match against The Young Bucks and Future Shock; the Bravados were the first team eliminated. In November, the duo lost to the Briscoe Brothers in a qualifying match for the Survival of the Fittest tournament. At the Final Battle 2011 pay-per-view, the Bravado Brothers were part of a tag team gauntlet match to determine the number one contenders to the ROH World Tag Team Championship, but were the first team eliminated by Caprice Coleman and Cedric Alexander.

Following a tour of Japan, the Bravado Brothers returned to ROH at Unity in April 2012, defeating The Young Bucks. The following month, the pair challenged Wrestling's Greatest Tag Team (Shelton Benjamin and Charlie Haas) for the ROH World Tag Team Championship. They won the match by disqualification, and so did not win the championship. They competed only sporadically for ROH throughout mid-2012, including a loss to Coleman and Alexander at Glory By Honor XI, which was their last ROH appearance.

=== Independent promotions (2011–2017) ===
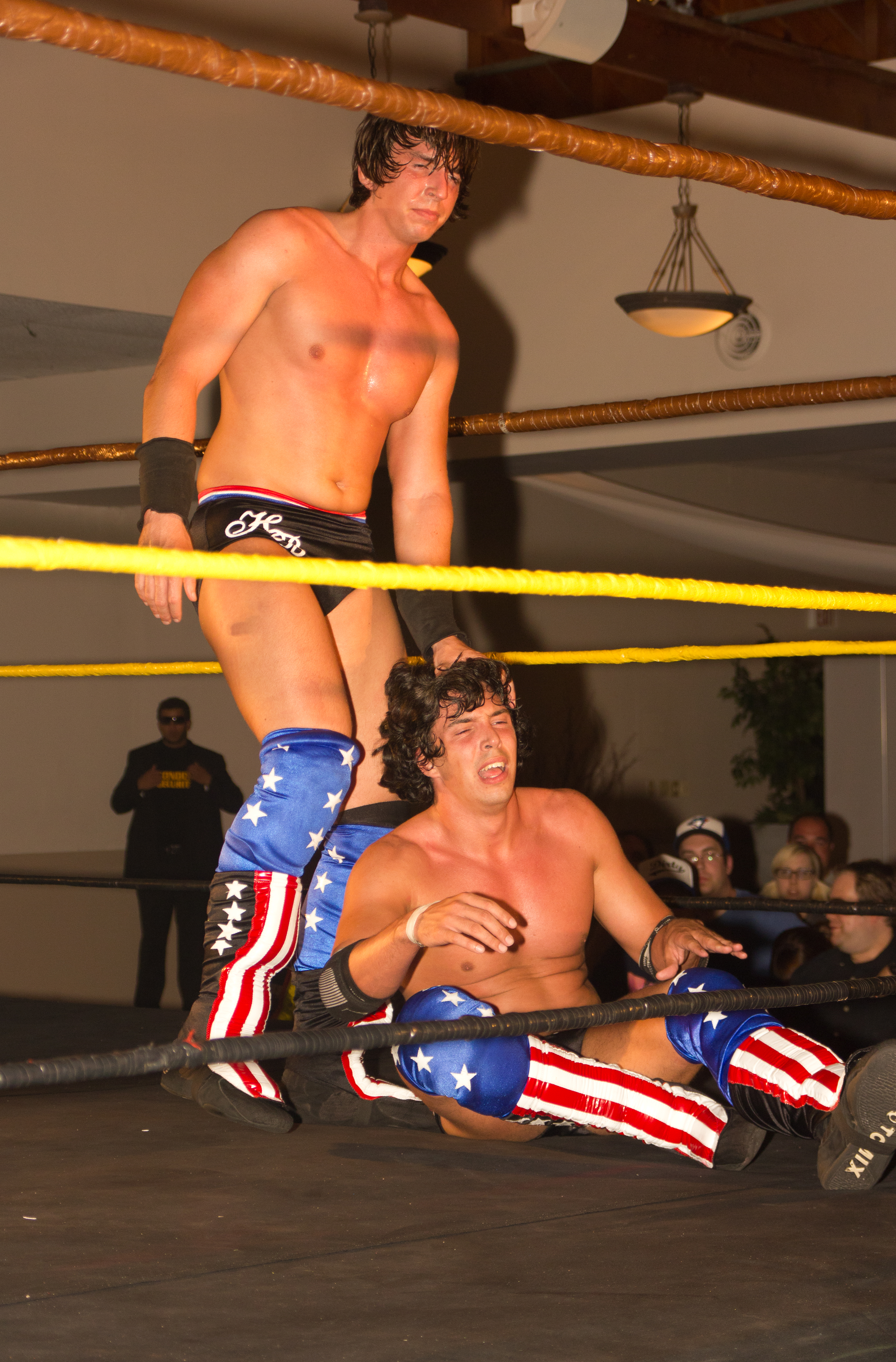
Harlem (standing) and Lance Bravado in the ring at a Chikara show in June 2012

On November 12, 2011, they debuted for Chikara, losing to 3.0 (Scott Parker and Shane Matthews). Throughout 2012, they made sporadic appearances for the promotion, including participating in the 2012 torneo cibernetico on November 18, as part of Team Kevin Steen. On May 18, 2013, the Bravados returned to take part in the 2013 Tag World Grand Prix, but were eliminated in the first round by The Batiri (Kodama and Obariyon).

In 2013, the duo began working for the Evolve promotion. On May 30, they defeated Maxwell Chicago and Sugar Dunkerton at Evolve 20 and the following day at Evolve 21, they defeated Derek Ryze and Andrew Everett. On June 2, at Evolve 22, they teamed with Everett in a loss to Dos Ben Dejos and Shane Strickland.

In 2013, the Bravados also began working for Full Impact Pro (FIP). They debuted at Ascension in April, where they defeated Tommy Taylor and Kenneth Cameron, before attacking the FIP Tag Team Champions Dos Ben Dejos. On July 5, at the Declaration of Independence internet pay-per-view, the Bravado Brothers won a three-way match against Dos Ben Dejos and KOA (Sugar Dunkerton and Aaron Epic) to win the FIP Tag Team Championship. On November 16, the Bravado Brothers defeated The Young Bucks to win Dragon Gate USA's Open the United Gate Championship. On December 6, they lost the FIP Tag Team Championship to Rich Swann and Roderick Strong. On September 14, 2014, at Evolve 35, The Bravado Brothers lost the Open the United Gate Championship to Anthony Nese and Caleb Konley in a three-way match, also involving A. R. Fox and Rich Swann. In 2017, Lance Bravado retired from wrestling thus disbanding the team. Harlem Bravado continued to wrestle on the independent circuit mainly for Evolve Wrestling before he signed with WWE in 2021. He was released April 24, 2026.

=== Pro Wrestling Noah (2012–2013) ===
In January 2012 the Bravado Brothers moved to Japan for three months to train with and compete for Pro Wrestling Noah. Lance's first match in Japan was against Yoshinobu Kanemaru in Korakuen Hall. While at Noah, the pair mostly competed in singles matches, but also teamed up sporadically. They returned to Noah in January 2013.

=== Total Nonstop Action Wrestling (2016) ===
In December 2016, the Bravado Brothers appeared in the special Impact Wrestling episode "Total Nonstop Deletion" as entrants in the Tag Team Apocalypto for the TNA Tag Team Championship.

== Outside of professional wrestling ==
In 2018, Houston Barrow (Lancelot Bravado) was the Libertarian candidate for the District 65 seat in the North Carolina House of Representatives. He placed third in the general election with 2,220 votes (7.74%), as the seat was held by the Republican Party, with Jerry Carter the overall winner.

== Championships and accomplishments ==
- Battle Zone
  - Battle Zone United States Championship (1 time) – Harlem
- Dragon Gate USA
  - Open the United Gate Championship (1 time)
- Full Impact Pro
  - FIP Tag Team Championship (1 time)
- Pro Wrestling Illustrated
  - Ranked Harlem No. 281 of the top 500 wrestlers in the PWI 500 in 2012
  - Ranked Lance No. 284 of the top 500 wrestlers in the PWI 500 in 2012
- Premiere Wrestling Xperience
  - PWX Tag Team Championship (2 times)
- Wrestle Force
  - Wrestle Force Tag Team Championship (1 time)
