= FOW Tag Team Championship =

Professional wrestling tag team championship

Details
- Promotion: Future of Wrestling
- Date established: May 20, 1998
- Date retired: December, 2013
Statistics
- First champion(s): The Masked Assassins (Bobby and Rusty Brooks)
- Final champion(s): Red Devil Fight Team (Mikhail Ivanov and Aleksander Chekov)
- Most reigns: The Vandalz (Tommy and Johnny Vandal) (5 reigns)

The FOW Tag Team Championship was a professional wrestling tag team title in American independent promotion Future of Wrestling. The title was created when The Masked Assassins (Bobby and Rusty Brooks) won the titles in Miami, Florida on May 20, 1998. It was defended throughout southern Florida, most often in Davie, Oakland Park, Pembroke Pines and occasionally in Ft. Lauderdale and Miami, Florida. There have been a total of 33 recognized individual champions and 16 recognized teams, who have had a combined 24 official reigns.

== Title History ==
Wrestlers	Reigns	Date	Place	Notes
The Masked Assassins (Bobby and Rusty Brooks)	1	May 20, 1998	Miami, FL	
Bobby and Blare Rogers	1	June 30, 1998	Atlanta, GA	
The Dudleys (Snot and Schmuck Dudley)	1	October 10, 1998	Oakland Park, FL	
Extreme Militia ("Sycho" Sean Allen and Flex Magnum)	1	August 14, 1999	Pembroke Pines, FL	
Wildside (Jeff Roth and Anthony Michaels)	2	September 25, 1999	Pembroke Pines, FL	
FP&L (Tony Apollo, Anthony Adonis and Billy Fives)	1	December 30, 1999	Davie, FL	
Suicidal Tendencies (Dennis and Sean Allen)	1	February 12, 2000	Fort Lauderdale, FL	
The Waverunners (Shred and Wet Willie)	1	March 26, 2000	Fort Lauderdale, FL	
The Market Crashers (Dow Jones and NASDAQ)	1	April 22, 2000	Fort Lauderdale, FL	
Suicidal Tendencies (Dennis and Sean Allen)	2	July 8, 2000	Fort Lauderdale, FL	
Chris Charger and Al Bino	1	March 10, 2001	Oakland Park, FL	
Chris Charger (2) and Jeff Roth (3)	1	May 12, 2001	Davie, FL	Chris Charger and Jeff Roth are forced to team together when each retrieves the titles during a ladder match between Chris Charger and Al Bino against Anthony Michaels and Jeff Roth.
The Vandalz (Ricky and Tommy Vandal)	1	June 17, 2001	Davie, FL	
The Market Crashers (Dow Jones and NASDAQ)	2	August 18, 2001	Miami, FL	
The Vandalz (Ricky and Tommy Vandal)	2	September 22, 2001	Miami, FL	
Dave Johnson and Hack Meyers	1	December 20, 2001	Davie, FL	
The Vandalz (Ricky and Tommy Vandal)	3	February 8, 2002	Tampa, FL	
Redneck Mafia (Big Daddy Gonzo and J.J. Kodiak)	1	March 23, 2002	Oakland Park, FL	Match held at the American Legion Post #222.
The Vandalz (Ricky and Tommy Vandal)	4	April 13, 2002	Davie, FL	
Animal House (Jeff Roth (4) and Anthony Michaels)	3	June 29, 2002	Davie, FL	
Antonio Banks and Punisher	1	August 31, 2002	Plantation, FL	Antonio Banks and Punisher remain champions until the promotion closes in early 2003.
The Vandalz (Tommy Vandal and Johnny Vandal )	5	January 29, 2011	Davie, FL	
1.21 Jiggawatts (Chris Jones and E.R.A. III)	1	June 18, 2011	Hollywood, FL	Jones and E.R.A. win titles in a Gauntlet match.
Red Devil Fight Team (Mikhail Ivanov and Aleksander Chekov)	1	August 6, 2011	Hollywood, FL	
T.E.C.H. (Mike Monroe and TC Read)	1	August 14, 2013	Hollywood, FL	
Tony Amir Bloomingfield & "The Reaper" Matt Craven	1	February 15, 2014	Dania Beach, FL	Defeated T.E.C.H. via Island Shot
"The Reaper" Matt Craven and Señor Ronjay	1	November 15, 2014	Dania Beach, FL	Tony Amir Bloomingfield vacated the title to Señor Ronjay after contracting AIDS.
Tony Amir Bloomingfield & "The Reaper" Matt Craven	2	November 16, 2014	Dania Beach, FL	Tony Amir Bloomingfield defeated Señor Ronjay in a thumb wrestling match to regain his belt accidentally.
VACANT	-	December 4, 2018	Dania Beach, FL	Tony Amir Bloomingfield vacated his Tag Team Championship due to undergoing foot reconstruction surgery. "The Reaper" Matt Craven vacated his Tag Team Championship after contracting AIDS from Señor Ronjay.

.
