= NWA Midwest Heavyweight Championship =

American professional wrestling championship

The NWA Midwest Heavyweight Championship is the top professional wrestling title in the NWA Midwest promotion. The title has been in use since 2001. On November 1, 2011, the title was renamed Zero1 Pro Wrestling USA Midwest Heavyweight Championship, when NWA Midwest left the National Wrestling Alliance (NWA).

== Title history ==
| Wrestler: | Times: | Date: | Location: | Notes: |
|---|---|---|---|---|
| Mike Samson | 1 | March 17, 2001 | Hillside, Illinois | Defeated Turbo to become the first champion. The two had been the final men remaining in a 20-man battle royal. |
Samson was stripped of the title on September 5, 2002.
| Danny Dominion | 1 | October 28, 2002 | Grayslake, IL | Defeated Donovan Morgan. |
Dominion was stripped of the title on January 17, 2004 in Green Bay, Wisconsin due to no-showing a title defense.
| Adam Evans | 1 | January 17, 2004 | Green Bay, WI | Defeated Chris Jordan and Eric Priest in a three-way match. |
| Silas Young | 1 | February 22, 2004 | Wheaton, IL | |
| Ken Anderson | 1 | July 16, 2004 | Milwaukee, WI | Defeated Silas Young and Colt Cabana in a three-way match. |
| Chris Candido | 1 | November 12, 2004 | Milwaukee, WI | |
Title vacated after Chris Candido died on April 28, 2005.
| Johnny Candido | 1 | September 17, 2005 | Streamwood, IL | Defeated Danny Daniels to win the vacant championship. |
Title vacated in January 2007.
| Jay Ryan | 1 | May 5, 2007 | Streamwood, IL | Defeated Marek Brave. |
| Silas Young | 2 | August 15, 2008 | Milwaukee, WI | On February 13, 2009 the NWA Midwest Heavyweight Championship was unified with the ICW Midwest Championship. |
| The Sheik | 1 | October 23, 2009 | Ashton, Illinois | Defeated Silas Young |
| Silas Young | 3 | December 4, 2009 | Green Bay, WI | |
| The Sheik | 2 | December 5, 2009 | Pulaski, WI | |
| Sadist | 1 | January 14, 2011 | West Allis, WI | |
| Steve Corino | 1 | August 20, 2011 | West Allis, WI | |
| Sebastian Rose | 1 | June 23, 2013 | Toledo, OH | |
| Nitro | 1 | March 23, 2014 | Oregon, OH | Sebastian gave Nitro to win due to his retirement |
