= Kory Chavis =

American professional wrestler

Personal information
- Born: Richmond, Virginia, U.S.

Professional wrestling career
- Ring name(s): Kory Chavis; Rainman
- Billed height: 6 ft 3 in (1.91 m)
- Billed weight: 224 lb (102 kg)
- Billed from: The Dark City
- Trained by: New Jack; Murder One
- Debut: March 1, 1998

Kory Chavis is an American professional wrestler, also known by the ring name Rainman. He works for several independent promotions, including Dragon Gate USA, Full Impact Pro, and Evolve. Chavis wrestled with tag team partner Jon Davis as The Dark City Fight Club , and with Davis is a former co-holder of both the NWA Florida Tag Team Championship and the NWA World Tag Team Championship.

== Early life ==
In high school, Chavis played football for one year, and played basketball and participated in wrestling for three years.

== Professional wrestling career ==
After being trained by New Jack and Murder One in Atlanta, Georgia, Chavis made his professional wrestling debut on March 1, 1998.

=== Rainman (2001–2007) ===
Chavis quickly began using the name Rainman, and began competing for NWA Wildside. He began teaming with Murder One (Then known as Homicide) as Blackout, and the pair won the NWA Wildside Tag Team Championship by defeating Tony Stradlin and Todd Sexton on August 10, 2001. They won the championship for the second time on November 17, 2001, when they won a four-way match for the championship. Rainman then moved into singles competition in NWA Wildside, and won the NWA Wildside Television Championship on December 28, 2002, by defeating Tony Mamaluke in a tournament. He was the awarded the championship on September 6, 2003, after Jeremy V was stripped of it, to begin his second reign. On March 26, 2005, he won the NWA Wildside Heavyweight Championship for the first time by defeating Ray Gordy and Onyx in a three-way match.

Rainman began competing in Full Impact Pro (FIP) in 2004. On September 24 and 25, he participated in a tournament for the FIP World Heavyweight Championship, defeating Jason Cross and Kahagas before losing to CM Punk in the semi-finals. He continued to compete for FIP throughout the rest of 2004 and 2005, competing against wrestlers including Dan Maff, Azrieal, Sal Rinauro, Samoa Joe, Antonio Banks.

In 2006, Rainman began competing in Combat Zone Wrestling (CZW), and on December 12, at Cage of Death 8, he and Onyx won the CZW World Tag Team Championship by defeating BLK-OUT (Sabian and Robbie Mireno). They held the championship for a month, before losing it back to a different combination of BLK-OUT members, Ruckus and Sabian, at New Year, New Opportunities on January 13, 2007.

=== Kory Chavis (2005–2008) ===
At the end of 2005, Rainman changed his ring name to Kory Chavis in FIP, and became the bodyguard of SoCal Val. He gained the nickname "The Soul Assassin" in early 2006, and continued to wrestle in FIP. He also competed for NWA Anarchy and !Bang! during this time.

In 2008, Chavis made three appearances on Total Nonstop Action Wrestling's Impact! television program, losing to Judas Mesias, Kurt Angle and Matt Morgan.

=== Dark City Fight Club (2008— ) ===
In March 2008, Chavis teamed with up Jon Davis as The Dark City Fight Club (DCFC) in FIP. They were revealed as a team on March 22, when they defeated Shayne Swift and Myles Long, and were revealed to have been the masked team that had attacked the Black Market tag team. The following month DCFC faced Black Market in a match that ended in a no contest when DCFC poured gasoline onto Black Market member Joey Machete and threatened to set him on fire. In an Anything Goes match in May, DCFC defeated Black Market, which was followed by Black Market's Shawn Murphy defeating Davis via disqualification and Machete defeating Chavis in a No Disqualification match on July 19. The following month at Heatstroke '08, DCFC defeated Black Market in a weapons match to end the feud. Throughout 2009, DCFC competed sporadically for FIP. On March 28, they defeated Bumz R' Us in a street fight. At the first night of the Jeff Peterson Memorial Cup on November 20, they competed in a 'tag team rumble', which was won by Bumz R' Us. In 2010 DCFC moved into FIP Tag Team Championship contention. They faced the champions, The British Lions and The Irish Airborne in a three-way match for the championship on June 26, but were unsuccessful. On July 31, 2010, DCFC won the FIP Tag Team Championship in Crystal River, Florida by defeating The British Lions.

On January 16, 2010, DCFC made their debut for the Evolve promotion, by defeating Aeroform (Flip Kendrick and Louis Lyndon). They also compete for Pro Wrestling Fusion, where they won the NWA Florida Tag Team Championship on August 22, 2009 by defeating Dagon and Sinn Bodhi for the vacant championship. They held the championship for 225 days, successfully defending it against The Network, Bumz R' Us, and The Poppers, before losing it to The New Heavenly Bodies (Chris Nelson and Vito DeNucci) on April 4, 2010. They regained the championship from The New Heavenly Bodies on April 16, 2010. On November 20, 2010, the Dark City Fight Club defeated Rasche Brown and Keith Walker to win the NWA World Tag Team Championship for the first time. Chavis and his D.C.F.C. team member Jon Davis made their debut for NWA Rampage in December 2010 where they faced the RPW tag team champions the Usual Suspects. The match ended in a Time Limit Draw. On January 29 at RPW's Reloaded the fight club returned to NWA Rampage where they defeated the Suspects in a rematch after interference from Charlie Cash's group, The Hate Junkies. On April 17 the fight club successfully defended the NWA tag team titles against Caleb Konley and Cedric Alexander. They would lose the title to the Usual Suspects (A.J. Steele and Murder One) on May 1, 2011 at Memorial Mayhem 2011. They would regain the title two weeks later on May 15. The team is believed to have broken up in 2012 (there were no NWA tag title defenses with both Chavis & Davis during the last half of 2012 - one would appear with a local substitute). Chavis teamed with Lance Hoyt to drop the titles to the Kingz of the Underground in San Antonio, Texas on December 15, 2012.

==== Ring of Honor (2009–2010) ====
On February 6, 2009, Chavis and Davis made their Ring of Honor debut at Proving Ground 2009: Night 1. They appeared at the Ring of Honor Wrestling television tapings on March 1, where they defeated Grizzly Redwood and Andy Ridge in a squash match. On April 24, Davis dislocated his wrist during a tag team match, which kept him out of action for three months. At the November 5 television tapings, DCFC fought the Briscoe Brothers to a no contest.

At the January 8, 2010, tapings of Ring of Honor Wrestling DCFC squashed the Bravado Brothers (Harlem and Lance), and at the tapings the following night they defeated the former ROH World Tag Team Champions The American Wolves (Davey Richards and Eddie Edwards). They challenged the Briscoe Brothers for the ROH World Tag Team Championship at ROH's Eight Anniversary Show in New York City on February 13, but were unsuccessful. At the March 6, 2010 tapings, they won a squash match, before they lost to the Briscoes. At the tapings themselves, the match was billed as a non-title match, but by the time the match aired on May 10, the Briscoes had lost the Tag Team Championship, and the match was instead billed as a number one contender's match. On the July 5 episode of Ring of Honor Wrestling, DCFC defeated The Kings of Wrestling (Chris Hero and Claudio Castagnoli) via disqualification when the Briscoes interfered.

In July 2010, ROH announced the teams that would be participating in the Tag Wars tournament, to determine three teams which would challenge the Kings of Wrestling in the final Ultimate Endurance match. Chavis and Davis faced and defeated The Embassy team of Shawn Daivari and Ernesto Osiris in the first round and defeated the Bravado Brothers in the semi-finals on August 27. The following night, on August 28, DCFC faced the Kings of Wrestling, The All Night Express (Kenny King and Rhett Titus) and the Briscoe Brothers in the Ultimate Endurance match, but were unsuccessful as the Kings of Wrestling won the match to retain the ROH World Tag Team Championship and win Tag Wars.

==== Dragon Gate USA (2011) ====
On April 3, 2011, at Open the Ultimate Gate, the Dark City Fight Club was presented as Dragon Gate USA's newest tag team. In their first match in the promotion, Chavis and Davis were defeated by the Dirty Ugly Fucks (Arik Cannon and Sami Callihan).

==== Ring Warriors (2012—2013) ====
Chavis started to wrestled in Ring Warriors in 2012. In 2013, he started a tag team with Frank Stone. On September 28, 2013, New Jack revealed as his manager.

== Championships and accomplishments ==
- Combat Zone Wrestling
  - CZW World Tag Team Championship (1 time) – with Onyx
- Full Impact Pro
  - FIP Tag Team Championship (1 time) – with Jon Davis
- Funkin' Conservatory
  - FC Tag Team Championships (1 time) - with Murder-1
- Go Wrestle
  - GW Openweight Championship (1 time, inaugural)
  - GW Openweight Championship Tournament (2016)
  - GW Powerweight Championship (1 time, current)
- National Wrestling Alliance
  - NWA World Tag Team Championship (2 times) - with Jon Davis
- NWA Anarchy
  - NWA Anarchy Heavyweight Championship (1 time)
- NWA Wildside
  - NWA Wildside Heavyweight Championship (1 time)
  - NWA Wildside Tag Team Championship (2 times) – with Homicide
  - NWA Wildside Television Championship (2 times)
- Pro Wrestling Fusion
  - NWA Florida Tag Team Championship (2 times) – with Jon Davis
- Pro Wrestling Illustrated
  - PWI ranked him #198 of the top 500 singles wrestlers in the PWI 500 in 2011
- Pro Wrestling Riot
  - PWR Tag Team Championship (1 time) – with Jon Davis
- United States Wrestling Alliance
  - USWA Tag Team Championship (2 times) - with Jon Davis
- Vintage Wrestling
  - Vintage Heavyweight Championship (1 time)
