= Jeff Peterson Memorial Cup =

US annual professional wrestling show

- Promotion(s): Full Impact Pro (2006–2011); NWA Florida (2003–2005)
- Date: 2003–2012

The Jeff Peterson Memorial Cup was an annual professional wrestling memorial show produced by Full Impact Pro (FIP) promotion, typically between October and December. The event was established to honor the memory of independent wrestler "All American" Jeff Peterson who died at age 21 after a two-year battle with leukemia. A rising star in the National Wrestling Alliance at the time of his death, his home promotion NWA Florida held a memorial tournament, co-hosted by IPW Hardcore, presented by his friends and fellow Florida wrestlers. The first show was held on May 16–17, 2003, at the Florida WrestlePlex in St. Petersburg, Florida. It is the longest-running tournament in the Southeastern United States followed by CWF Mid-Atlantic's Johnny Weaver Memorial Tournament.

It was a standard 16-man single-elimination tournament intended to showcase the top junior heavyweight wrestlers from independent promotions throughout the United States and Japan. Many top "indy" wrestlers have participated in the event with former winners including Reckless Youth (2003), Justice (2004), Chris Sabin (2005), Milano Collection AT (2006), Chris Hero (2007), Erick Stevens (2008), Davey Richards (2009), and Sami Callihan (2010). The tournament was originally held by NWA Florida from 2003 to 2005, when it closed, and was continued by Full Impact Pro the following year. Both promotions held a combined 9 Memorial Cup tournaments. The tenth tournament on December 14 and 15, 2012, was billed as the last ever Jeff Peterson Memorial Cup and was an independent internet pay-per-view not officially held by any promotion. No wrestler has ever won the tournament twice, but multiple wrestlers have participated in the event more than once.

The event has also featured other wrestling personalities. The 2007 and 2008 editions were hosted by Lenny Leonard and Scott Hudson, former commentators for Ring of Honor and World Championship Wrestling respectively. In 2009, "Outlaw" Ron Bass came out of retirement to wrestle Sean Davis (with Amy Vitale and Phil Davis) in a Texas Bullrope match. Gabe Sapolsky claimed that he used the 2009 tournament to scout talent prior to starting EVOLVE two months later. The following year, five champions took part in the 2010 Jeff Peterson Memorial Cup; FIP World Heavyweight Champion Jon Moxley, FIP Florida Heritage Champion Jake Manning, NWA World Junior Heavyweight Champion Craig Classic, PWR Heavyweight Champion Bruce Santee, and PWR Tag Team Champion Milo Beasley. Aaron Epic, Peterson's last opponent before his death, also competed in the 2011 tournament. It was his first appearance with the company in several years and, though he was eliminated by Jerrelle Clark in the opening round, he praised the event commenting in a later interview for 411mania.com that "there has not been a lot of things that people remember from Florida wrestling but people always remember JPC and to be part of it was an honor".

Since its beginning in 2003, the Jeff Peterson Memorial Cup has been specifically used to raise money for various charities in the state of Florida. The recipient for the 2008 edition, for example, was a two-year-old child diagnosed with a rare form of cancer while proceeds from the 2009 edition went to St. Petersburg's All Children's Hospital.

== Tournament winners ==
Tournament	Year	Winner	Total won	Reference
JPM-Cup I	2003	Reckless Youth	1	
JPM-Cup II	2004	Justice	1	
JPM-Cup III	2005	Chris Sabin	1	
JPM-Cup IV	2006	Milano Collection A.T.	1	
JPM-Cup V	2007	Chris Hero	1	
JPM-Cup VI	2008	Erick Stevens	1	
JPM-Cup VII	2009	Davey Richards	1	
JPM-Cup VIII	2010	Sami Callihan	1	
JPM-Cup IX	2011	A. R. Fox	1	
JPM-Cup X	2012	Samuray del Sol	1	

== Jeff Peterson Memorial Cup (2003) ==
=== Jeff Peterson Memorial Cup, Night 1 ===
May 16, 2003 in St. Petersburg, Florida (Florida WrestlePlex)

#	Results	Stipulations	Times
1	Naphtali defeated Seijin Akki	First round tournament match	n/a
2	B-Boy defeated Steve Madison	First round tournament match	n/a
3	Tony Mamaluke defeated Jerrelle Clark	First round tournament match	n/a
4	Reckless Youth defeated Sonjay Dutt	First round tournament match	n/a
5	Jason Cross defeated CM Punk	First round tournament match	n/a
6	Ruckus defeated Roderick Strong	First round tournament match	n/a
7	Sedrick Strong defeated David Babylon	First round tournament match	n/a
8	Justice defeated Colt Cabana	First round tournament match	n/a
9	Chaos defeated Havoc and Kubiak	Three-Way Dance	n/a
10	Lex Lovett defeated Agent Steele	Singles match; Due to a prematch stipulation, Lovett earned a title shot against IPW Heavyweight Champion Billy Fives.	n/a
11	Mike Sullivan and Scoot Andrews defeated Danny Doring and Mikey Tenderfoot	Tag team match	n/a

=== Jeff Peterson Memorial Cup, Night 2 ===
May 17, 2003 in St. Petersburg, Florida (Florida WrestlePlex)

#	Results	Stipulations	Times
1	Naphtali defeated B-Boy	Quarter Final Tournament Match	n/a
2	Reckless Youth defeated Tony Mamaluke	Quarter Final Tournament Match	n/a
11	Ruckus defeated Jason Cross	Quarter Final Tournament Match	n/a
12	Sedrick Strong defeated Justice	Quarter Final Tournament Match	n/a
13	Reckless Youth defeated Naphtali	Semi Final Tournament match	n/a
14	Sedrick Strong defeated Ruckus	Semi Final Tournament match	n/a
15	Reckless Youth defeated Roderick Strong	Tournament Finals match with Special Guest Referee Jet Jaguar	n/a
16	Frankie Capone, Pat Powers, and Pat McGroin defeated Pretty Fly, Comic Book Guy Anderson, and Mark Zout	Six-man tag team match	n/a
17	Agent Steele and Navy Seal fought to a no-contest	Singles match	n/a
18	Sonjay Dutt and Steve Madison defeated Jerrelle Clark and Roderick Strong	Tag team match	n/a
19	Billy Fives defeated Lex Lovett	Singles match for the IPW Heavyweight Championship	n/a
20	The Shane Twins (Mike Shane and Todd Shane) (c) defeated Danny Doring and Steve Corino	Tag team match for the NWA Tag Team Championship	n/a

=== Tournament bracket ===
The tournament took place from May 16–17, 2003. The tournament brackets were:

Pin-Pinfall; Sub-Submission; CO-Countout; DCO-Double countout; DQ-Disqualification; Ref-Referee's decision

First round
B-Boy
Steve Madison
Naphtali
Seijin Akki
Reckless Youth
Sonjay Dutt
Tony Mamaluke
Jerrelle Clark
Jason Cross
CM Punk
Ruckus
Roderick Strong
Sedrick Strong
David Babylon
Justice
Colt Cabana

Quarterfinals
B-Boy
Naphtali
Reckless Youth
Tony Mamaluke
Jason Cross
Ruckus
Sedrick Strong
Justice

Semi-finals
Naphtali
Reckless Youth
Ruckus
Sedrick Strong

Final
Reckless Youth
Sedrick Strong

== Jeff Peterson Memorial Cup (2004) ==
=== Jeff Peterson Memorial Cup, Night 1 ===
June 4, 2004 in Brandon, Florida (Brandon Allstars)

#	Results	Stipulations	Times
1	Roderick Strong (NWA Florida) defeated Sedrick Strong (NWA Florida)	First round tournament match	n/a
2	Alex Shelley (IWA Mid-South) defeated Jimmy Jacobs (CZW)	First round tournament match	n/a
3	Chris Hero (IWA Mid-South) defeated Matt Striker (ECWA)	First round tournament match	n/a
4	Homicide (JAPW) defeated Black Tigers (NWA Florida)	First round tournament match	n/a
5	Teddy Hart (H2wrestling) defeated Azrieal (JAPW)	First round tournament match	n/a
6	Mikey Tenderfoot (NWA Florida) defeated Puma (PWG)	First round tournament match	n/a
7	Petey Williams (BCW) defeated Naphtali (NWA Florida)	First round tournament match	n/a
8	Justice (NWA Florida) defeated Jack Evans (ROH)	First round tournament match	n/a
9	Danny Doring (with Vudu) defeated Z-Barr and Slyk Wagner Brown (with April Hunter)	Three-Way Dance	n/a
10	Lex Lovett defeated Colt Cabana	Singles match; Due to a prematch stipulation, Lovett earned a title shot against IPW Heavyweight Champion Billy Fives.	n/a
11	Zach Gowen, Chi Chi Cruz and Jerrelle Clark defeated The Bug, Erick Stevens and OG Scarface (with Ana Mosity)	Six-man tag team match	n/a
12	The Shane Twins (Mike Shane and Todd Shane) (with Eric Loi and Ron Niemi) defeated Steve Madison and Mike Sullivan (with XTC Jenni Lee)	Tag team	n/a

=== Jeff Peterson Memorial Cup, Night 2 (Afternoon) ===
June 5, 2004 in St. Petersburg, Florida (National Guard Armory)

#	Results	Stipulations	Times
1	Teddy Hart defeated Mikey Tenderfoot	Semi Final Tournament Match	n/a
2	Justice defeated Petey Williams	Semi Final Tournament Match	n/a
11	Roderick Strong defeated Alex Shelley	Semi Final Tournament Match	n/a
12	Chris Hero received a bye	Semi Final Tournament Match	n/a
13	April Hunter defeated Jenni Taylor and Chrissy Daine	Three-Way Dance	n/a
14	Luther Jackson defeated OG Scarface (with Ana Mosity)	Singles match	n/a
15	Naphtali defeated Andre Lyonz, Chasyn Rance, David Babylon, Krazy K, Lit, and Mikey Batts	Last Man Standing match	n/a
16	The Cuban Assassin (with Fantasy) (c) defeated Jeremy Lopez	Singles match for the Pacific Northwest Heavyweight Championship	n/a
17	John Brooks, Chi Chi Cruz, and Azrieal defeated Puma, Matt Striker, and Sedrick Strong	Six-man tag team match	n/a
18	Jeff Bradley and Jimmy Jacobs defeated Bug and Z-Barr	Tag team match	n/a

=== Jeff Peterson Memorial Cup, Night 2 (Evening) ===
June 5, 2004 in St. Petersburg, Florida (National Guard Armory)

#	Results	Stipulations	Times
1	Justice defeated Chris Hero and Roderick Strong	Tournament Finals match with Special Guest Referee Jet Jaguar	n/a
2	Alex Shelley and Petey Williams defeated Mikey Tenderfoot and Black Tigers	Tag team match	n/a
3	Bruce Steele defeated Slyk Wagner Brown	Singles match	n/a
4	Zach Gowen defeated Rod Steel (with Eric Loy)	Singles match	n/a
5	Scoot Andrews (with Robby Mireno) defeated Colt Cabana	Singles match	n/a
6	Mike Sullivan defeated Danny Doring	Singles match for the NWA Southern Heavyweight Championship	n/a
7	Jerrelle Clark (c) defeated Azrieal (with Jack Evans)	Singles match for the NWA World Junior Heavyweight Championship	n/a
8	Lex Lovett and Steve Madison defeated The Shane Twins (Mike Shane and Todd Shane)	Tag team match with Special Guest Referee "Honest" Eddie Edwards	n/a
9	Double Deuce Inc. (Frankie Capone and Marcus Dillon) (with Cannon) defeated Clinically Inclined (Dr. Heresy and Andre Lyons)	Tag team match	n/a

=== Tournament brackets ===
The tournament took place from June 4–5, 2004. The tournament brackets were:

Pin-Pinfall; Sub-Submission; CO-Countout; DCO-Double countout; DQ-Disqualification; Ref-Referee's decision

First round
Roderick Strong
Sedrick Strong
Alex Shelley
Jimmy Jacobs

Semifinals
Roderick Strong
Alex Shelley

First round
Chris Hero
Matt Striker
Homicide
Black Tigers

Semifinals
Chris Hero
BYE

First round
Teddy Hart
Azrieal
Mikey Tenderfoot
Puma

Semifinals
Teddy Hart
Mikey Tenderfoot

First round
Petey Williams
Naphtali
Justice
Jack Evans

Semifinals
Petey Williams
Justice

=== Finals ===
Semi-Finals
Roderick Strong
Alex Shelley
Chris Hero
Bye
Justice
Petey Williams

Finals^{1}
1	Roderick Strong
2	Chris Hero
3	Justice

1. A fourth semi-final match was held between Teddy Hart and Mikey Tenderfoot, which Hart won. He suffered a knee injury during the bout, however, and was forced to leave the tournament. Chris Hero had also received a bye for his semi-final match against Homicide and officials ordered the tournament to be decided among the three remaining participants in a final three-way elimination match.

== Jeff Peterson Memorial Cup (2005) ==
=== Jeff Peterson Memorial Cup, Night 1 ===
June 10, 2005 in Brandon, Florida (Brandon All Stars)

#	Results	Stipulations	Times
1	Ricky Reyes defeated Jay Fury	First round tournament match	n/a
2	Matt Sydal defeated Tony Kozina	First round tournament match	n/a
3	Petey Williams defeated Jerrelle Clark	First round tournament match	n/a
4	Vordell Walker defeated Tony Mamaluke	First round tournament match	n/a
5	The Strong Brothers (Roderick Strong and Sedrick Strong) defeated Steve Madison and Erick Stevens	Tag team match	n/a
6	Sonjay Dutt defeated Todd Sexton	First round tournament match	n/a
7	Chris Sabin defeated Delirious	First round tournament match	n/a
8	Jimmy Rave defeated Fast Eddie	First round tournament match	n/a
9	Mikey Batts (with Billy Kidman) defeated James Gibson	First round tournament match	n/a
10	A.J. Styles (c) defeated Lex Lovett	Singles match for the NWA World Heavyweight Championship; As per the pre-match stipulation, Lovett was forced to retire.	n/a

=== Jeff Peterson Memorial Cup, Night 2 ===
June 11, 2005 in Brandon, Florida (Brandon All Stars)

#	Results	Stipulations	Times
1	Jay Fury defeated Jerrelle Clark, Chasyn Rance, and Aaron Epic	Fatal 4 Way match	n/a
2	Vordell Walker defeated Matt Sydal	Quarter Final Tournament match	n/a
3	Jimmy Rave defeated Petey Williams	Quarter Final Tournament match	n/a
4	Antonio Banks defeated Rod Steel (with Ron Niemi)	Singles match	n/a
5	Chris Sabin defeated Mikey Batts	Quarter Final Tournament match	n/a
6	Sonjay Dutt defeated Ricky Reyes	Quarter Final Tournament match	n/a
7	Double Deuce Inc. (Frankie Capone and Marcus Dillon) (c) defeated The Vandalz (Johnny and Tommy Vandal), The Market Crashers (Joey Machete and Shawn Murphy), and The Heartbreak Express (Phil and Sean Davis)	Fatal 4 Way tag team match for the NWA Florida Tag Team Championship	n/a
8	Chris Sabin defeated Vordell Walker	Semi Final Tournament match	n/a
9	Sonjay Dutt defeated Jimmy Rave	Semi Final Tournament match	n/a
10	Tony Kozina and Sal Rinauro defeated Fast Eddie and Todd Sexton	Tag team match	n/a
11	Bruce Steele (with Ron Niemi) (c) defeated Roderick Strong	Single match for the NWA Florida Heavyweight Championship	n/a
12	Chris Sabin defeated Sonjay Dutt	Final Tournament match	n/a

=== Tournament bracket ===
The tournament took place from June 10–11, 2005. The tournament brackets were:

Pin-Pinfall; Sub-Submission; CO-Countout; DCO-Double countout; DQ-Disqualification; Ref-Referee's decision

First round
Sonjay Dutt
Todd Sexton	Pin
Ricky Reyes
Jay Fury	Sub
Jimmy Rave
Fast Eddie	Pin
Petey Williams
Jerrelle Clark	Pin
Vordell Walker
Tony Mamaluke	Pin
Matt Sydal
Tony Kozina	Pin
Chris Sabin
Delirious	Pin
Mikey Batts
James Gibson	Pin

Quarterfinals
Sonjay Dutt
Ricky Reyes	Pin
Jimmy Rave
Petey Williams	Sub
Vordell Walker
Matt Sydal
Chris Sabin
Mikey Batts	Pin

Semi-finals
Sonjay Dutt
Jimmy Rave	Pin
Chris Sabin
Vordell Walker	Pin

Final
Chris Sabin
Sonjay Dutt	Pin

== Jeff Peterson Memorial Cup (2006) ==
=== Jeff Peterson Memorial Cup, Night 1 ===
June 16, 2006 in Sanford, Florida (Sanford Civic Center)

#	Results	Stipulations	Times
1	Jerrelle Clark defeated Dagon (with Naphtali) and Ryan Drago	Three-Way Dance	9:03
2	Ruckus defeated T.J. Mack	First round tournament match	8:44
3	The Canadian Cougar defeated Jake Manning	First round tournament match	8:00
4	Frankie Ciatso (with Molly Holly) defeated Erick Stevens (with SoCal Val)	Singles match	10:37
5	Joey Ryan defeated El Generico	First round tournament match	11:03
6	Milano Collection A.T. defeated Arik Cannon	First round tournament match	13:48
7	Rod Steel defeated Davey Richards	First round tournament match	13:47
8	Reckless Youth defeated Chasyn Rance	First round tournament match	10:47
9	Billy Kidman defeated Naphtali	Singles match	10:26
10	Krazy K defeated T.J. Wilson	First round tournament match	10:37
11	Delirious defeated Human Tornado	First round tournament match	15:04
12	Christopher Daniels defeated Roderick Strong	Singles match	15:18

=== Jeff Peterson Memorial Cup, Night 2 ===
June 17, 2006 in Pinellas Park, Florida (The Boys and Girls Club)

#	Results	Stipulations	Times
1	T.J. Wilson defeated Human Tornado, Jake Manning, Arik Cannon, El Generico and T.J. Mack	Six-Way Dance	n/a
2	Ruckus defeated Canadian Cougar	Quarter Final Tournament match	n/a
3	Joey Ryan defeated Rod Steel	Quarter Final Tournament match	n/a
4	Naphtali defeated OG Scarface and Havok	Three-Way Dance; this was a special "tribute match" to Jeff Peterson	n/a
5	Delirious defeated Krazy K	Quarter Final Tournament match	n/a
6	Milano Collection A.T. defeated T.J. Wilson	Quarter Final Tournament match	n/a
7	Modern Day Theory (Scott Commodity and Preston James) (with Molly Holly) defeated Bruce Santee and Pretty Fly (with Amy Love)	Tag team match	n/a
8	Ruckus defeated Joey Ryan	Semi Final Tournament match	n/a
9	Milano Collection A.T. defeated Delirious	Semi Final Tournament match	n/a
10	Billy Kidman defeated Lex Lovett	Singles match	n/a
11	Christopher Daniels defeated Sedrick Strong	Singles match	n/a
12	Milano Collection A.T. defeated Ruckus	Final Tournament match	n/a

=== Tournament bracket ===
The tournament took place from June 16–17, 2006. The tournament brackets were:

Pin-Pinfall; Sub-Submission; CO-Countout; DCO-Double countout; DQ-Disqualification; Ref-Referee's decision

First round
Ruckus
T.J. Mack	Pin
Canadian Cougar
Jake Manning	Pin
Joey Ryan
El Generico	Pin
Rod Steel
Davey Richards	Pin
Milano Collection AT
Arik Cannon	Pin
Reckless Youth
Chasyn Rance	Pin
Krazy K
T.J. Wilson	Pin
Delirious
Human Tornado	Pin

Quarterfinals
Ruckus
Canadian Cougar
Joey Ryan
Rod Steel
Milano Collection AT
TJ Wilson^{1}
Krazy K
Delirious

Semi-finals
Ruckus
Joey Ryan
Milano Collection AT
Delirious

Final
Milano Collection AT
Ruckus

1. Reckless Youth had to leave the event for unspecified reasons. Instead of his opponent receiving a bye to the semi-finals, a six-way match was held among the already eliminated participants to replace Youth in the tournament which was won by TJ Wilson.

== Jeff Peterson Memorial Cup (2007) ==
=== Jeff Peterson Memorial Cup, Night 1 ===
July 13, 2007 in Orlando, Florida (Downtown Orlando Recreation Center)

#	Results	Stipulations	Times
1	Matt Cross (ROH) defeated Sal Rinauro (FIP)	First round tournament match	10:22
2	Billy Roc (NWA Indiana) defeated Seth Delay (APW-GA)	First round tournament match	6:53
3	Kahagas, Leon Scott and The Sheik (with Larry Zbyszko and Mister Saint Laurent) defeated Heater, Pretty Fly and Ray Beez	Six-man tag team match	8:48
4	Erick Stevens (FIP) defeated Nooie Lee (FPWA)	First round tournament match	12:48
5	Chasyn Rance (FIP) defeated Chi Chi Cruz (EWA)	First round tournament match	5:46
6	Double Deuce (Frankie Capone and Pete Cannon) defeated Wrongful Death (Dagon Briggs and Naphtali)	Tag team match	7:30
7	Chris Hero (Chikara) defeated Trik Davis (NWA-FSM)	First round tournament match	12:19
8	The Bug defeated Dr. Reginald Heresy, Jack Manley, and Jerrelle Clark	Four Corners match	7:20
9	Krazy K (GOUGE) defeated Scott Commodity (FIP)	First round tournament match	10:10
10	Bruce Santee (FIP) defeated TJ Mack (AWA Superstars)	First round tournament match	5:42
11	The Strong Brothers (Roderick Strong and Sedrick Strong) defeat The New Heavenly Bodies (Chris Nelson and Vito DeNucci)	Tag team match	10:05
12	Adam Flash (MCW) defeated Sideshow (ACW)	First round Tournament steel cage match	4:03
13	Mister Saint Laurent (with Larry Zbyszko) won a 19-man battle royal (Note: The other participants included were: Dagon Briggs, Dany Only, Dr. Reginald Heresy, Heater, Jay Sorrow, Kahagas, Leon Scott, Pete Cannon, Pretty Fly, Ray Beez, Shooter Storm, SNOW, The Bug, The Sheik, The Anarchy Suicide Squad (Havoc & Naphtali), and Inner Aggression (Bull Pain and Butch Long).)	Rage In The Cage IX Weapons Battle Royal	n/a

=== Jeff Peterson Memorial Cup, Night 2 ===
July 14, 2007 in Port Richey, Florida (Jewish Community Center)

#	Results	Stipulations	Times
1	Krazy K (GOUGE) defeated Billy Roc (NWA Indiana)	Quarter Final Tournament match	n/a
2	Matt Cross (ROH) defeated Bruce Santee (FIP)	Quarter Final Tournament match	n/a
3	Lex Lovett and Steve Madison defeated Chi Chi Cruz and Sedrick Strong	Tag team match	n/a
4	Chris Hero (Chikara) defeated Erick Stevens (FIP)	Quarter Final Tournament match	n/a
5	Chasyn Rance (ROH) defeated Adam Flash (MCW)	Quarter Final Tournament match	n/a
6	Amy Love defeated Dr. Reginald Heresy	Intergender match	n/a
7	The Freak Foundation (Dagon Briggs & OG Scarface) defeat The Anarchy Suicide Squad (Havoc & Naphtali)	Tag team match	n/a
8	Chris Hero (Chikara) defeated Krazy K (GOUGE)	Semi Final Tournament match	n/a
9	Matt Cross (ROH) defeated Chasyn Rance (FIP)	Semi Final Tournament match	n/a
10	TJ Mack defeated Nooie Lee and Seth Delay	Three Way Dance	n/a
11	Sal Rinauro & Trik Davis defeated Inner Aggression (Bull Pain & Butch Long) and Scott Commodity & Shan Hill	Three-Way Dance	n/a
12	Chris Hero (Chikara) defeated Matt Cross (ROH)	Final Tournament match	n/a

=== Tournament bracket ===
The tournament took place from July 13–14, 2007. The tournament brackets were:

Pin-Pinfall; Sub-Submission; CO-Countout; DCO-Double countout; DQ-Disqualification; Ref-Referee's decision

First round
Krazy K
Scott Commodity	Pin
Billy Roc
Seth Delay	Pin
Chris Hero
Trik Davis	Sub
Erick Stevens
Nooie Lee	Pin
Chasyn Rance
Chi Chi Cruz	Pin
Adam Flash
Sideshow	Pin
Bruce Santee
TJ Mack	Pin
Matt Cross
Sal Rinauro	Pin

Quarterfinals
Krazy K
Billy Roc	Pin
Chris Hero
Erick Stevens	Pin
Chasyn Rance
Adam Flash	Pin
Bruce Santee
Matt Cross	Pin

Semi-finals
Krazy K
Chris Hero	Sub
Chasyn Rance
Matt Cross	Pin

Final
Chris Hero
Matt Cross	Sub

== Jeff Peterson Memorial Cup (2008) ==
=== Jeff Peterson Memorial Cup, Night 1 ===
September 26, 2008 in Port Richey, Florida (New Lakes in Regency Park Civic Center)

#	Results	Stipulations	Times
1	Larry Sweeney defeated Tommy Taylor	First round tournament match	n/a
2	Jaison Moore defeats Rhett Titus	First round tournament match	n/a
3	Chasyn Rance defeated Icarus and Jerrelle Clark	Three Way match	n/a
4	Jon Davis defeats CJ O'Doyle	First round tournament match	n/a
5	Gran Akuma defeated Craig Classic	First round tournament match	n/a
6	The Heartbreak Express (Phil Davis and Sean Davis) and Scott Davis (with Amy Vitale and Raymond Snow) defeated The Lifeguards (Daron Smythe and Wade Koverly) and Austin Amadeus	Six-man tag team match	n/a
7	Brad Attitude defeated Nooie Lee	First round tournament match	n/a
8	Sal Rinauro defeated Chris Gray	First round tournament match	n/a
9	911 Incorporated (Frankie Capone, Kory Chavis, and Shawn Osbourne) (with Ron Niemi) defeated Bruce Santee and Sideshow	This was a 3-on-2 handicap match	n/a
10	Kenny King defeats Jigsaw	First round tournament match	n/a
12	Erick Stevens defeats Chris Jones	First round tournament match	n/a

=== Jeff Peterson Memorial Cup, Night 2 ===
September 27, 2008 in Brooksville, Florida (National Guard Armory)

#	Results	Stipulations	Times
1	Brad Attitude defeated Jaison Moore	Quarter Final Tournament match	n/a
2	Larry Sweeney defeats Sal Rinauro	Quarter Final Tournament match	n/a
3	Gran Akuma defeated Jon Davis	Quarter Final Tournament match	n/a
4	Erick Stevens defeated Kenny King	Quarter Final Tournament match	n/a
5	Bumz R' Us (Mr. Milo Beasley and Ray Beez) defeated The House of Vitale (Lou The Fixer and Raymond Snow) (with Amy Vitale)	Tables, Ladders & Chairs tag team match	n/a
6	CJ O'Doyle, Craig Classic, J-Rod and Jigsaw defeated Chasyn Rance, Icarus, Moonshine McCoy, and Rhett Titus	Eight-man tag team match	n/a
7	Erick Stevens defeated Larry Sweeney	Semi Final Tournament match	n/a
8	Brad Attitude defeats Gran Akuma	Semi Final Tournament match	n/a
9	The British Lions (Chris Gray and Tommy Taylor) defeated Damballah and Mad Man Mandrake (with Amy Vitale), Fantastic Dantastic and K-Dizzy, Jerrelle Clark and Nooie Lee, The Heartbreak Express (Phil and Sean Davis), The Lifeguards (Daron Smythe and Wade Koverly), and The Loggers (Dagon Briggs and Jack Manley)	Tag Team Gauntlet match	n/a
10	Erick Stevens defeats Brad Attitude	Final Tournament match	n/a
11	Bruce Santee, Sedrick Strong, Sideshow, and Black Market (Joey Machete and Shawn Murphy) (with Amy Love and Danielle) defeated 911 Incorporated (Francisco Ciatso, Kory Chavis, Mike Shane, Ron Niemi, and Shawn Osbourne)	Ten-man War Games match	n/a

=== Tournament bracket ===
The tournament took place from September 26–27, 2008. The tournament brackets were:

Pin-Pinfall; Sub-Submission; CO-Countout; DCO-Double countout; DQ-Disqualification; Ref-Referee's decision

First round
Brad Attitude
Nooie Lee	Pin
Jaison Moore
Rhett Titus	Pin
Jon Davis
CJ O'Doyle	Pin
Gran Akuma
Craig Classic	Pin
Larry Sweeney
Tommy Taylor	Pin
Sal Rinauro
Chris Gray	Pin
Kenny King
Jigsaw	Pin
Erick Stevens
Chris Jones	Sub

Quarterfinals
Brad Attitude
Jaison Moore	Pin
Jon Davis
Gran Akuma	Pin
Larry Sweeney
Sal Rinauro	Ref
Kenny King
Erick Stevens	Pin

Semi-finals
Brad Attitude
Gran Akuma	Pin
Larry Sweeney
Erick Stevens	Pin

Final
Brad Attitude
Erick Stevens	Pin

== Jeff Peterson Memorial Cup (2009) ==
=== Jeff Peterson Memorial Cup, Night 1 ===
November 20, 2009 in Brooksville, Florida (National Guard Armory)

#	Results	Stipulations	Times
1	Louis Lyndon (HYBRID) defeated Marion Fontaine (HYBRID)	First round tournament match	11:05
2	Johnny Gargano (AAW) defeated Chris Jones (FIP)	First round tournament match	13:30
3	Jon Moxley (CZW) defeated Brad Attitude (FIP)	First round tournament match	12:00
4	Silas Young (AAW) defeated Dave Cole (HYBRID)	First round tournament match	12:00
5	Shane Hollister (AAW) defeated Flip Kendrick (HYBRID)	First round tournament match	12:15
6	T. J. Perkins (FIP) defeated Arik Cannon (AAW)	First round tournament match	13:12
7	Egotistico Fantastico (CZW) defeated Scotty Vortekz (CZW)	First round tournament match	16:00
8	Davey Richards (FIP) defeated Drake Younger (CZW)	First round tournament match	22:47

=== Jeff Peterson Memorial Cup, Night 2 ===
November 21, 2009 in Crystal River, Florida (National Guard Armory)

#	Results	Stipulations	Times
1	Davey Richards (FIP) defeated Egotistico Fantastico (CZW)	Quarter Round Tournament match	10:20
2	T. J. Perkins (FIP) defeated Shane Hollister (AAW)	Quarter Round Tournament match	10:08
3	Johnny Gargano (AAW) defeated Louis Lyndon (HYBRID)	Quarter Round Tournament match	8:08
4	Silas Young (AAW) defeated Jon Moxley (CZW)	Quarter Round Tournament match	14:08
5	The Dark City Fight Club (Jon Davis and Kory Chavis) defeated The James Boys (Luke and Rich James)	Tag team match	n/a
6	Davey Richards (FIP) defeated T. J. Perkins (FIP)	Semi Final Tournament match	11:44
7	Silas Young (AAW) defeated Johnny Gargano (AAW)	Semi Final Tournament match	6:19
8	Drake Younger defeated Arik Cannon, Brad Attitude, Chris Jones, Dave Cole, Flip Kendrick, Marion Fontaine, and Scotty Vortekz	Eight-Way Fray elimination match	19:00
9	Ron Bass defeated Sean Davis (with Amy Vitale and Phil Davis)	Texas Bullrope match	n/a
10	Davey Richards (FIP) defeated Silas Young (AAW)	Final Tournament match	12:40

=== Tournament bracket ===
The tournament took place from November 20–21, 2009. The tournament brackets were:

Pin-Pinfall; Sub-Submission; CO-Countout; DCO-Double countout; DQ-Disqualification; Ref-Referee's decision

First round
Louis Lyndon
Marion Fontaine	Pin
Johnny Gargano
Chris Jones	Pin
Jon Moxley
Brad Attitude	Sub
Silas Young
Dave Cole	Pin
Shane Hollister
Flip Kendrick	Pin
T. J. Perkins
Arik Cannon	Sub
Egotistico Fantastico
Scotty Vortekz	Pin
Davey Richards
Drake Younger	Sub

Quarterfinals
Louis Lyndon
Johnny Gargano	Sub
Jon Moxley
Silas Young	Sub
Shane Hollister
T. J. Perkins	Pin
Egotistico Fantastico
Davey Richards	Pin

Semi-finals
Johnny Gargano
Silas Young	Sub
T. J. Perkins
Davey Richards	Sub

Final
Silas Young
Davey Richards	Sub

== Jeff Peterson Memorial Cup (2010) ==
=== Jeff Peterson Memorial Cup, Night 1 ===
December 3, 2010 in Brooksville, Florida (National Guard Armory)

#	Results	Stipulations	Times
1	Sami Callihan defeated Chris Dickinson	First round tournament match	n/a
2	Sugar Dunkerton defeated Scott Reed (with Larry Dallas)	First round tournament match	n/a
3	Craig Classic defeated Lince Dorado	First round tournament match	n/a
4	Arik Cannon defeated Brad Allen	First round tournament match	n/a
5	Bruce Santee defeated Milo Beasley	Singles match	n/a
6	Frightmare defeated Jake Manning (with Christopher Gray and Ron Niemi)	First round tournament match	n/a
7	Jigsaw defeated Christopher Gray	First round tournament match	n/a
8	Rich Swann defeated Grizzly Redwood	First round tournament match	n/a
9	Jon Moxley defeated A. R. Fox	First round tournament match	n/a
10	The Dark City Fight Club (Jon Davis and Kory Chavis) (c) defeated The Strong Brothers (Roderick Strong and Sedrick Strong)	Tag team match for the FIP Tag Team Championship	n/a

=== Jeff Peterson Memorial Cup, Night 2 ===
December 4, 2010 in Crystal River, Florida (National Guard Armory)

#	Results	Stipulations	Times
1	Jon Moxley defeated Sugar Dunkerton	Quarter Final Tournament match	n/a
2	Sami Callihan defeated Frightmare	Quarter Final Tournament match	n/a
3	Arik Cannon defeated Craig Classic	Quarter Final Tournament match	n/a
4	Rich Swann defeated Jigsaw	Quarter Final Tournament match	n/a
5	Jon Moxley defeated Arik Cannon	Semi Final Tournament match	n/a
6	Sami Callihan defeated Rich Swann	Semi Final Tournament match	n/a
7	Chris Dickinson, Christopher Gray, Jake Manning and Scott Reed (with Christina, Larry Dallas and Ron Niemi) defeated A. R. Fox, Brad Allen, Grizzly Redwood and Lince Dorado	Eight-man tag team match	n/a
8	Sami Callihan defeated Jon Moxley	Final Tournament match	n/a

=== Tournament bracket ===
The tournament took place from December 3–4, 2010. The tournament brackets were:

Pin-Pinfall; Sub-Submission; CO-Countout; DCO-Double countout; DQ-Disqualification; Ref-Referee's decision

First round
Sugar Dunkerton
Scott Reed	Pin
Jon Moxley
A. R. Fox	Pin
Craig Classic
Lince Dorado	Pin
Arik Cannon
Brad Allen	Pin
Sami Callihan
Chris Dickinson	Sub
Frightmare
Jake Manning	Pin
Jigsaw
Christopher Gray	Pin
Rich Swann
Grizzly Redwood	Pin

Quarterfinals
Sugar Dunkerton
Jon Moxley	Pin
Craig Classic
Arik Cannon	Pin
Sami Callihan
Frightmare	Sub
Jigsaw
Rich Swann	Pin

Semi-finals
Jon Moxley
Arik Cannon	Pin
Sami Callihan
Rich Swann	Sub

Final
Jon Moxley
Sami Callihan	Pin

== Jeff Peterson Memorial Cup (2011) ==
=== Jeff Peterson Memorial Cup, Night 1 ===
October 28, 2011 in Brooksville, Florida (National Guard Armory): Ring Announcer- Sean LaFlash

#	Results	Stipulations	Times
1	The Scene (Caleb Konley & Scott Reed) won an 11-team battle royal. (Note: The other participants included were: Bryan Maddox & CJ O'Doyle, Brooklyn Shore (Francisco Ciatso & Mickael Zaki), Bumz R' Us (Milo Beasley & Ray Beez), Josh Rayne & Matt Ripley, Los Ben Dejos (Ben Dejo & Marty Con Dejo), Moco Loco & South Bronx Sadist, Ninja With Attitudes (Eddie Taurus & Kaotic Romeo), The Highwaymen (Butch Long & Marc Mandrake), The Misled Youth (Joshua Masters & Jude McKenzie), and The Worlds Largest All Knighters (Joey Knight & Shooter Storm).)	Eleven-team battle royal; as per the pre-match stipulations, the winning team earned a title shot against FIP Tag Team Champions The Dark City Fight Club (Jon Davis and Kory Chavis) in the semi-main event.	n/a
2	Lince Dorado defeated Louis Lyndon	First round tournament match	n/a
3	Jerrelle Clark defeated Aaron Epic	First round tournament match	n/a
4	Mike Cruz defeated Pinkie Sanchez	First round tournament match	n/a
5	Bobby Fish defeated Jonathan Gresham	First round tournament match	n/a
6	Flip Kendrick defeated Johnny Vandal	First round tournament match	n/a
7	Papadon defeated Chris Jones	First round tournament match	n/a
8	A. R. Fox defeated Jake Manning	First round tournament match	n/a
9	The Scene (Caleb Konley and Scott Reed) defeated The Dark City Fight Club (Jon Davis and Kory Chavis) (c)	Tag team match for the FIP Tag Team Championship	n/a
10	Johnny Gargano defeated John Silver	First round tournament match	n/a

=== Jeff Peterson Memorial Cup, Night 2 ===
October 29, 2011 in Crystal River, Florida (National Guard Armory): Ring Announcer- Sean LaFlash

#	Results	Stipulations	Times
1	Jonathan Gresham defeated Aaron Epic, Chris Jones, Johnny Vandal, John Silver, and Louis Lyndon	Six-Way match	n/a
2	Mike Cruz defeated Jerrelle Clark	Quarter Final Tournament match	n/a
3	A. R. Fox defeated Flip Kendrick	Quarter Final Tournament match	n/a
4	Bobby Fish defeated Papadon	Quarter Final Tournament match	n/a
5	Johnny Gargano defeated Jonathan Gresham	Quarter Final Tournament match	n/a
6	Uhaa Nation defeated Jake Manning (c)	Singles match for the FIP Florida Heritage Championship	n/a
7	A. R. Fox defeated Bobby Fish	Semi Final Tournament match	n/a
8	Johnny Gargano defeated Mike Cruz	Semi Final Tournament match	n/a
9	The Dark City Fight Club (Jon Davis and Kory Chavis) defeated The Scene (Caleb Konley and Scott Reed) and Pinkie Sanchez (with Larry Dallas)	This was a 3-on-2 handicap match	n/a
10	A. R. Fox defeated Johnny Gargano	Final Tournament match	n/a

=== Tournament bracket ===
The tournament took place on October 28–29, 2011. The tournament brackets were:

Pin-Pinfall; Sub-Submission; CO-Countout; DCO-Double countout; DQ-Disqualification; Ref-Referee's decision

First round
Bobby Fish
Jonathan Gresham	Pin
Papadon
Chris Jones	Pin
A. R. Fox
Jake Manning	Pin
Flip Kendrick
Johnny Vandal	Pin
Jerrelle Clark
Aaron Epic	Pin
Mike Cruz
Pinkie Sanchez	Pin
Lince Dorado
Louis Lyndon	Pin
Johnny Gargano
John Silver	Sub

Quarterfinals
Bobby Fish
Papadon	Pin
A. R. Fox
Flip Kendrick	Pin
Jerrelle Clark
Mike Cruz	Pin
Jonathan Gresham^{1}
Johnny Gargano	Pin

Semi-finals
A. R. Fox
Bobby Fish	Pin
Mike Cruz
Johnny Gargano	Sub

Final
A. R. Fox
Johnny Gargano	Pin

1. Lince Dorado had to leave the event due to a family emergency. Instead of his opponent receiving a bye to the semi-finals, a six-way match was held among the already eliminated participants to replace Dorado in the tournament, which was won by Jonathan Gresham.

== Jeff Peterson Memorial Cup (2012) ==
=== Jeff Peterson Memorial Cup, Night 1 ===
December 14, 2012 in Ybor City, Tampa, Florida

#	Results	Stipulations	Times
1	Samuray del Sol defeated Eddie Rios	First round tournament match	n/a
2	Shane Strickland defeated Joey Janela	First round tournament match	n/a
3	Jonathan Gresham defeated Derek Ryze	First round tournament match	n/a
4	A. R. Fox defeated Jay Cruz	First round tournament match	n/a
5	Mike Cruz defeated Maxwell Chicago	First round tournament match	n/a
6	Lince Dorado defeated Johnny Vandal	First round tournament match	n/a
7	Jon Davis defeated John Silver	First round tournament match	n/a
8	Papadon (with Larry Dallas and Trina Michaels) defeated Charles Cardwell	First round tournament match	n/a

=== Jeff Peterson Memorial Cup, Night 2 ===
December 15, 2012 in Ybor City, Tampa, Florida

#	Results	Stipulations	Times
1	Samuray del Sol defeated Jonathan Gresham	Quarter Final Tournament match	n/a
2	A. R. Fox defeated Shane Strickland	Quarter Final Tournament match	n/a
3	Jon Davis defeated Mike Cruz	Quarter Final Tournament match	n/a
4	Lince Dorado defeated Papadon (with Larry Dallas and Trina Michaels)	Quarter Final Tournament match	n/a
5	John Silver defeated BJ Hancock, Black Baron, Derek Ryze, Eddie Rios, Jay Cruz, Joey Janela, Johnny Vandal and Maxwell Chicago	Nine-man fray	n/a
6	Samuray del Sol defeated Jon Davis	Semi Final Tournament match	n/a
7	A. R. Fox defeated Lince Dorado	Semi Final Tournament match	n/a
8	Milo Beasley defeated Larry Dallas (with Papadon and Trina Michaels)	Ybor City Street Fight	n/a
9	Samuray del Sol defeated A. R. Fox	Final Tournament match	n/a

=== Tournament bracket ===
The tournament took place on December 14–15, 2012. The tournament brackets were:

Pin-Pinfall; Sub-Submission; CO-Countout; DCO-Double countout; DQ-Disqualification; Ref-Referee's decision

First round
Eddie Rios
Samuray del Sol	Pin
Derek Ryze
Jonathan Gresham	Pin
Maxwell Chicago
Mike Cruz	Pin
Jon Davis
John Silver	Pin
A. R. Fox
Jay Cruz	Pin
Joey Janela
Shane Strickland	Pin
Johnny Vandal
Lince Dorado	Pin
Charles Cardwell
Papadon	Pin

Quarterfinals
Samuray del Sol
Jonathan Gresham	Pin
Mike Cruz
Jon Davis
A. R. Fox
Shane Strickland	Pin
Lince Dorado
Papadon	Pin

Semi-finals
Samuray del Sol
Jon Davis	Pin
A. R. Fox
Lince Dorado	Pin

Final
Samuray del Sol
A. R. Fox	Pin
