= Josef Samael =

American professional wrestler (born 1974)

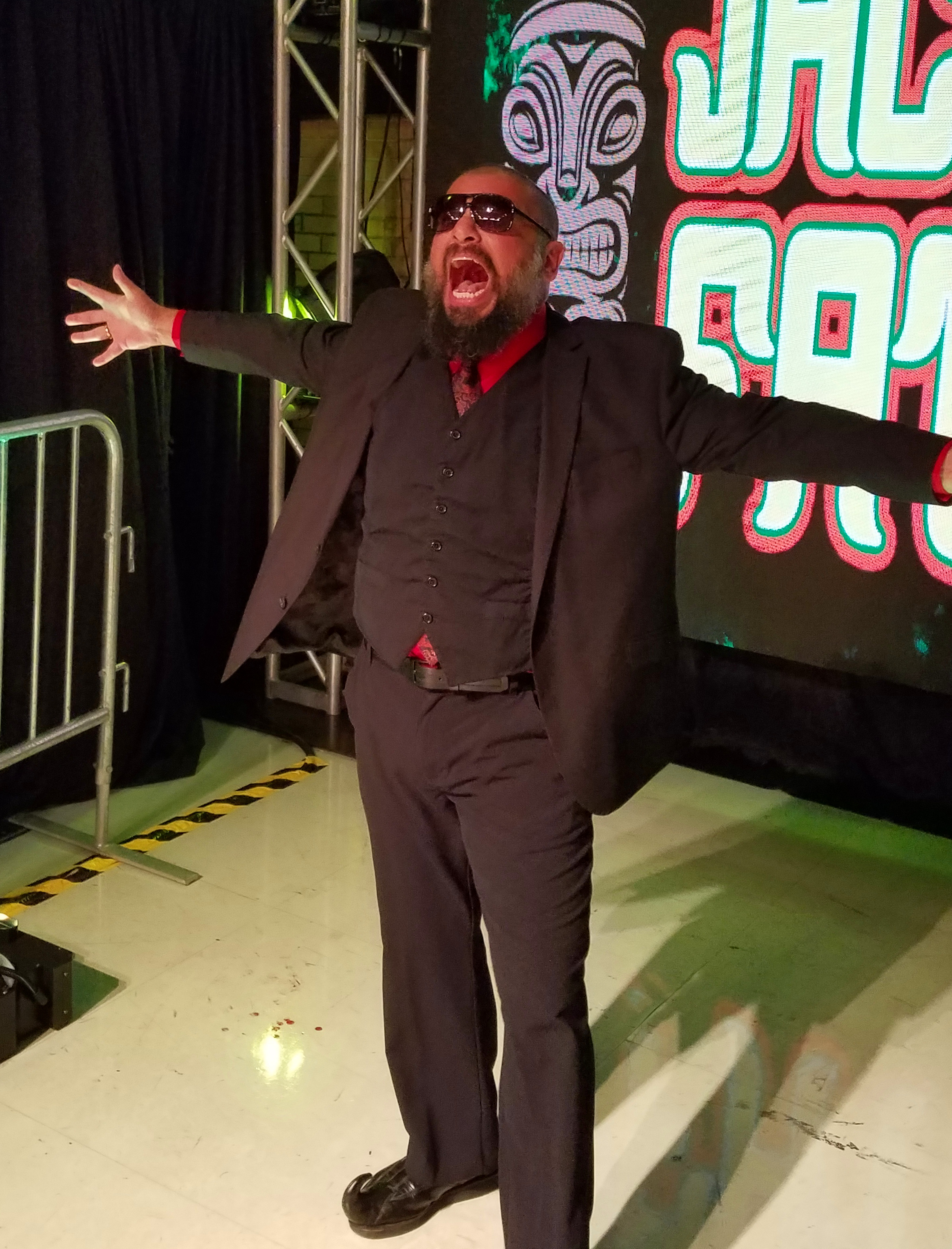
- Josef Samael at MLW Saturday Night SuperFight in 2019

Personal information
- Born: Joseph Cabibbo; May 21, 1974 (age 52)

Professional wrestling career
- Ring name(s): The Almighty Sheik; Joey Machete; Josef; Josef Samael; The Sheik (II); Sheik Ali Azzad; NASDAQ
- Billed height: 5 ft 10 in (1.78 m)
- Billed weight: 225 lb (102 kg)
- Billed from: New York City, New York; Damascus, Syria
- Trained by: The Blackharts
- Debut: August 1998

Joseph Cabibbo (born May 21, 1974) is an American professional wrestler. He is signed to Major League Wrestling (MLW), where he performs under the ring name Josef Samael and is the leader and on-screen manager of Contra Unit.

== Professional wrestling career ==
=== Early career (1998–2005) ===
Cabibbo worked early in his career in Florida independent promotions such as Future Of Wrestling, IPW Hardcore Wrestling, Maximum Xtreme Pro Wrestling and Coastal Championship Wrestling. In 2001, he made his debut in Puerto Rico for World Wrestling Council (WWC) as NASDAQ.

=== Full Impact Pro Wrestling (2005–2008) ===
Cabibbo debuted in Full Impact Pro (FIP) as Joey Machete in November 2005, teaming up with Shawn Murphy and losing to Seth Delay and Chasyn Rance. They won their first match against Tony Mamaluke and Chad Parham the following day. In April, they won a three-way tag team match, featuring the Heartbreak Express and the Y.R.R. They began a streak of victories and beat the Heartbreak Express to become tag team champions. They lost their titles against the Heartbreak Express. They left the promotion in August 2008, after losing a hardcore match against The Dark City Fight Club.

=== Pro Wrestling Fusion (2008–2010) ===
Cabibbo, working under the ring name The Sheik, has made the Florida promotion Pro Wrestling Fusion his home. Originally going by the new Sheik Ali Azzad, Cabibbo shortened the name, after receiving the blessing of Sabu, the nephew of the original Sheik. He won the NWA Florida Heavyweight Title by defeating Freedom Ryder on the inaugural show on May 3, 2008, in Ft. Pierce Florida. He also developed a feud with Steve Madison, who defeated the Sheik for the NWA Florida Heavyweight Title on February 2, 2009, inside a steel cage. The Sheik regained the NWA Florida Heavyweight Title from Madison on August 1, 2009.

=== National Wrestling Alliance (2009–2011) ===
The Sheik debuted in the National Wrestling Alliance's NWA Midwest in September 2009, attacking NWA Midwest Heavyweight champion, Silas Young at a RWF (Rebellious Wrestling Federation) show in Ashton IL. He then defeated Silas to win the championship. He was scheduled for a World Title match against Blue Demon, Jr. to be held in Cicero Stadium in Chicago Illinois, but Blue Demon backed out of the match. Silas Young, on the other hand, did sign up to wrestle the Sheik and defeated him in Green Bay, Wisconsin, on December 4, 2009, at ACW Homecoming. Sheik defeated Young to become a two-time NWA Midwest Heavyweight Champion on December 5, 2009.

On January 30, 2010, The Sheik defeated "El Gran" Apollo to become the new NWA North American Heavyweight Champion. On April 23, 2011, he defeated Colt Cabana in Jacksonville, Florida to become the 44th officially recognized NWA World Heavyweight Champion. He was stripped of the title on July 11, 2011. Officially, the NWA announced that Sheik had refused to defend the title on July 31, 2011, in Ohio, however Sheik's camp says he was never scheduled for the title defense.

=== Pro Wrestling Zero1 (2011–2012) ===
On May 23, 2011, The Sheik made his debut in Japan for Pro Wrestling Zero1. He returned to the promotion on July 3, defeating Ryouji Sai in a match, where both his NWA World Heavyweight Championship and Sai's World Heavyweight Championship were on the line, to become the new World Heavyweight Champion. He would go on to lose the title to Kohei Sato on November 6, 2011.

=== Independent circuit (2013–present) ===
Sheik only wrestled about a dozen matches between 2013 and the end of 2015. Starting in January 2016 he started wrestling frequently for a newly founded Southern California promotion PCW Ultra. His first matches for the promotion involved a feud between himself and Montel Vontavious Porter. On January 20, 2017, his newly formed team Warbeast, with Jacob Fatu won the PCW Tag Team Championship. The faction would grow to include Brody King and they would defend them under Freebirds rules. King has since left the promotion, signing with Ring of Honor in 2019, but Fatu and Sheik still hold the tag titles to this day.

=== Major League Wrestling (2019–2021) ===
Sheik debuted for Major League Wrestling (MLW) under the name Josef Samael, in February 2019 at SuperFight, alongside his frequent tag team partner Jacob Fatu. However, this match would not be aired on MLW Fusion. The duo of Fatu and Josef would make their debut appearance on Fusion on March 2, 2019, forming the heel stable Contra Unit with Simon Gotch. They debuted by attacking MLW World Heavyweight Champion Tom Lawlor following his cage match against Low Ki. The following week, Contra Unit attacked Ace Romero during his match with Gotch. After that, they had various feuds, but suddenly disappeared before War Chamber, not witnessing the end of his stable. He returned to MLW television in the Summer of 2026 as the Serpent of Contra Unit who had also returned in recent years. Once again Sheik seems to be the leader of the group.

=== Return to Major League Wrestling (2026–present) ===
On the August 1, 2026 episode of Fusion, Samael made his return to MLW, attacking Mads Krule Krügger before rejoining Contra Unit.

== Championships and accomplishments ==
- All Pro Wrestling
  - APW Tag Team Championship (1 time) – with Jacob Fatu
- American Wrestling Federation
  - AWF Tag Team Championship (1 time) – with Shawn Murphy
- Cauliflower Alley Club
  - Men's Wrestling Award (2015)
- Coastal Championship Wrestling
  - CCW South Eastern Championship (1 time)
  - CCW Tag Team Championship (2 times) – with Shawn Murphy
- DEFY Wrestling
  - DEFY Tag Team Championship (1 time) – with Jacob Fatu
- Florida Wrestling Alliance
  - FWA Tag Team Championship (3 times) – with Shawn Murphy
- Four Star Championship Wrestling
  - FSCW Tag Team Championship (1 time) – with Shawn Murphy
- Full Impact Pro
  - FIP Tag Team Championship (1 time) – with Shawn Murphy
- Future of Wrestling
  - FOW Heavyweight Championship (1 time)
  - FOW Tag Team Championship (3 times) – with Shawn Murphy
- Intense Florida Wrestling
  - IFW Tag Team Championship (2 times) – with Shawn Murphy
- Maximum Xtreme Pro Wrestling
  - MXPW Television Championship (1 time)
  - MXPW Tag Team Championship (1 time, inaugural) – with Shawn Murphy
  - Lords of the Ring Tournament (2006) – with Shawn Murphy
  - MXPW Tag Team Title Tournament (2004) – with Shawn Murphy
- NWA Florida
  - NWA Florida Heavyweight Championship (2 times)
  - NWA Florida Tag Team Championship (1 time) – with Christopher Gray
- NWA Midwest
  - NWA Midwest Heavyweight Championship (2 times)
- Pacific Coast Wrestling/PCW Ultra
  - PCW Ultra Tag Team Championship (1 time, final) – with Jacob Fatu and Brody King
- Pro Wrestling Fusion
  - NWA North American Heavyweight Championship (1 time)
  - NWA World Heavyweight Championship (1 time)
- Pro Wrestling Illustrated
  - PWI ranked him #103 of the 500 best singles wrestlers of the PWI 500 in 2011
- Pro Wrestling Zero1
  - World Heavyweight Championship (1 time)
  - NWA World Heavyweight Championship (1 time)
- Pro Wrestling Zero1 USA
  - NWA/AWA/Zero1 USA Unified World Heavyweight Championship (1 time)
- United States Xtreme Wrestling
  - USXW Tag Team Championship (1 time) – with Shawn Murphy
- Division One Pro Wrestling
  - D1PW Tag Team Championship (1 time) – with Shawn Murphy
