= World Wrestling Network =

Professional wrestling promotion

- Acronym: WWN
- Founded: 1993
- Style: American Wrestling
- Founder: Jim Crockett Jr.
- Owner(s): Jim Crockett Jr. (1993–1994); Paul Heyman (1993–1994)

The World Wrestling Network was a National Wrestling Alliance-affiliated professional wrestling promotion which was owned by promoter Jim Crockett, Jr., his last attempt to rebuild a national wrestling promotion after selling Jim Crockett Promotions to Ted Turner in 1988. As part of a non-compete clause in the agreement he signed with Turner, Crockett was unable to promote professional wrestling events for three years.

== History ==
In 1993, Crockett began contacting former World Championship Wrestling and World Wrestling Federation veterans such as Road Warrior Hawk, Jake "The Snake" Roberts and Paul Heyman. Heyman, who had recently left on bad terms with WCW, eventually became head booker for the promotion although he and Crockett would eventually part ways due to his commitments to then Eastern Championship Wrestling and ECW's eventual breakaway from the National Wrestling Alliance.

Holding its first event in Killeen, Texas in August 1993, the show proved moderately successful with 2,156 in attendance. The following year, the promotion held its first televised event at the Manhattan Center in New York City on February 28, 1994 which featured Road Warrior Hawk and Jake Roberts as well as Public Enemy, Sabu, Terry Funk, Shane Douglas and Missy Hyatt in her first appearance since being fired by WCW.

Both Crockett and Heyman had hoped to provide a unique concept of producing televised matches in high-definition television via Internet broadcast, using much of ECW's television production and other resources to do so (this is one of the reasons that Eddie Gilbert resigned his position as head booker and left the promotion in September 1993), however, the event was the only HDTV-television taping broadcast and eventually Crockett closed the promotion by the end of the year.

== World Wrestling Network in New York ==
World Wrestling Network in New York
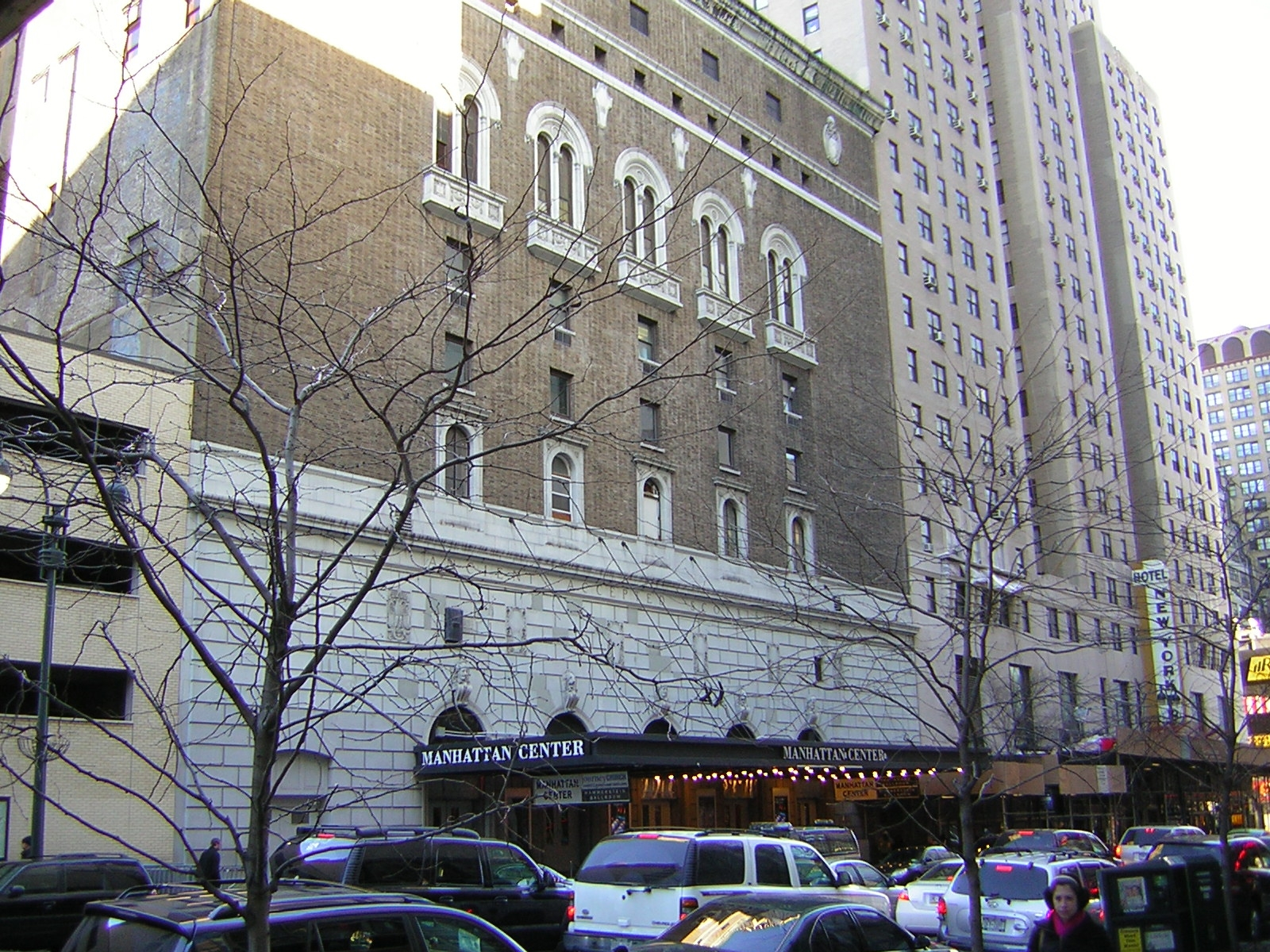
- The Manhattan Center.
- Promotion: World Wrestling Network
- Date: February 28, 1994
- City: New York City, New York, US
- Venue: Manhattan Center

On February 28, 1994, the World Wrestling Network carried out a television taping in the Manhattan Center in New York City, New York in the United States. The event featured multiple World Championship Wrestling and World Wrestling Federation alumni as well as wrestlers from Paul Heyman's Eastern Championship Wrestling promotion.

=== Event ===
During the event, Shane Douglas (accompanied by Missy Hyatt and multiple cheerleaders) gave a promo in which he declared he would be the inaugural World Wrestling Network Heavyweight Champion.

The main event was a single match between Sabu and Terry Funk which ended in a double disqualification. The bout saw multiple spectacles, including Funk throwing Sabu into a dumpster and pushing it around the Manhattan Center; Sabu dismantling a concession stand and then moonsaulting through the table; Funk breaking a glass bottle; and the two men brawling into the audience.

=== Results ===
No.	Results	Stipulations
1	Jake "The Snake" Roberts defeated "Cowboy" Bob Orton by pinfall	Singles match
2	The Bruise Brothers (Don Bruise and Ron Bruise) defeated Keith Scherer and The Kodiak Bear by pinfall	Tag team match
3	The Convict (with Sherri Martel) defeated Jason Knight by pinfall	Singles match
4	911 defeated Mikey Watson and Paul Lauria by pinfall	Handicap match
5	The Public Enemy (Rocco Rock and Johnny Grunge) defeated Badd Company (Pat Tanaka and Paul Diamond) by pinfall	Tag team match
6	Tommy Dreamer defeated Gino Caruso by pinfall	Singles match
7	Terry Funk defeated The Kodiak Bear by submission	Singles match
8	J.T. Smith and Tommy Cairo defeated The Captain and Mike B by pinfall	Tag team match
9	Road Warrior Hawk defeated Keith Scherer by pinfall	Singles match
10	Mikey Watson defeated Jason Knight by disqualification	Singles match
11	The Convict defeated Mikey Watson by submission	Singles match
12	The Tasmaniac defeated "Surfer" Ray Odyssey by pinfall	Singles match
13	The Public Enemy (Johnny Grunge and Rocco Rock) defeated Mikey Watson and Paul Lauria by pinfall	Tag team match
14	"Cowboy" Bob Orton defeated Tommy Dreamer by pinfall	Singles match
15	Keith Scherer defeated Jake "The Snake" Roberts by pinfall	Singles match
16	Sabu (with Paul E. Dangerously) vs. Terry Funk ended in a double-disqualification	Singles match
