= Full Impact Pro =

American professional wrestling promotion

- Type: Subsidiary
- Industry: Professional wrestling
- Founded: August 2, 2003; 23 years ago
- Founder: Sal Hamaoui
- Headquarters: Largo, Florida, U.S.
- Key people: Sal Hamaoui – President; Trevin Adams – VP
- Parent: WWNLive
- Website: Official website

Full Impact Pro (FIP) is an American professional wrestling promotion. It is currently part of the World Wrestling Network (WWN) along with Shine Wrestling. Sal Hamaoui founded the company and serves as the president, while Trevin Adams is the vice president of FIP.

FIP was founded in 2003 and has run the majority of their shows in Florida. The promotion was inactive from late 2011 until early 2013. They currently promote the FIP World Heavyweight Championship, FIP Tag Team Championship, and the FIP Florida Heritage Championship.

== History ==
Homicide, the first FIP Heavyweight Champion

Full Impact Pro was founded in 2003 by Sal Hamaoui. It was originally the sister promotion of Ring of Honor. The first show was held on August 2, 2003. The main event saw Mike Awesome defeat Justin Credible and New Jack. On September 25, 2004, FIP introduced the FIP Heavyweight Championship at Emergence: Part Two, where Homicide defeated CM Punk in the finals of a tournament.

On April 22, 2005, FIP introduced the FIP Tag Team Championship. Eddie Vegas and Jimmy Rave defeated the teams of Roderick Strong and Jerrelle Clark and CM Punk and Don Juan to become the inaugural champions. On March 3, 2007, Roderick Strong successfully defended the FIP Heavyweight Championship against Pac in Liverpool, England at ROH's "Fifth Year Festival: Liverpool" event, after which the title was renamed the "FIP World Heavyweight Championship". On March 10, 2007, FIP introduced their third championship, the FIP Florida Heritage Championship. Erick Stevens defeated Roderick Strong at Battle for the Belts to win the championship. In 2009, FIP and ROH parted ways.

After the partnership with ROH was dissolved, FIP became part of the World Wrestling Network (WWN), a governing body for various independent promotions in the United States. WWN was founded by FIP founder Sal Hamaoui and Gabe Sapolsky, formerly of Ring of Honor. In 2011, WWN launched "WWNLive", a web based, live-streaming service that featured internet pay-per-views from all its affiliated promotions. On October 29, 2011, FIP held the 2011 Jeff Peterson Memorial Cup, its last show before its hiatus, which lasted until 2013. FIP returned to running events regularly in Florida on February 1, 2013.

In November 2014, FIP, Evolve, Dragon Gate USA and Shine Wrestling participated in a WWNLive-organized tour of China. The following month, WWNLive announced a long-term deal with Great-Wall International Sports Management for regular tours of Asia. During the tour of China, Rich Swann defeated Trent Barretta to win the FIP World Heavyweight Championship and later defended it against A. R. Fox while still in China.

FIP has a training facility in Trinity, Florida, which they share with Evolve and Shine under the name "World Wrestling Network Academy".

On October 24, 2016, WWNLive and FloSports announced a new streaming service, Club WWN, which would host events held by the WWNLive promotions, including FIP.

== Recurring shows ==
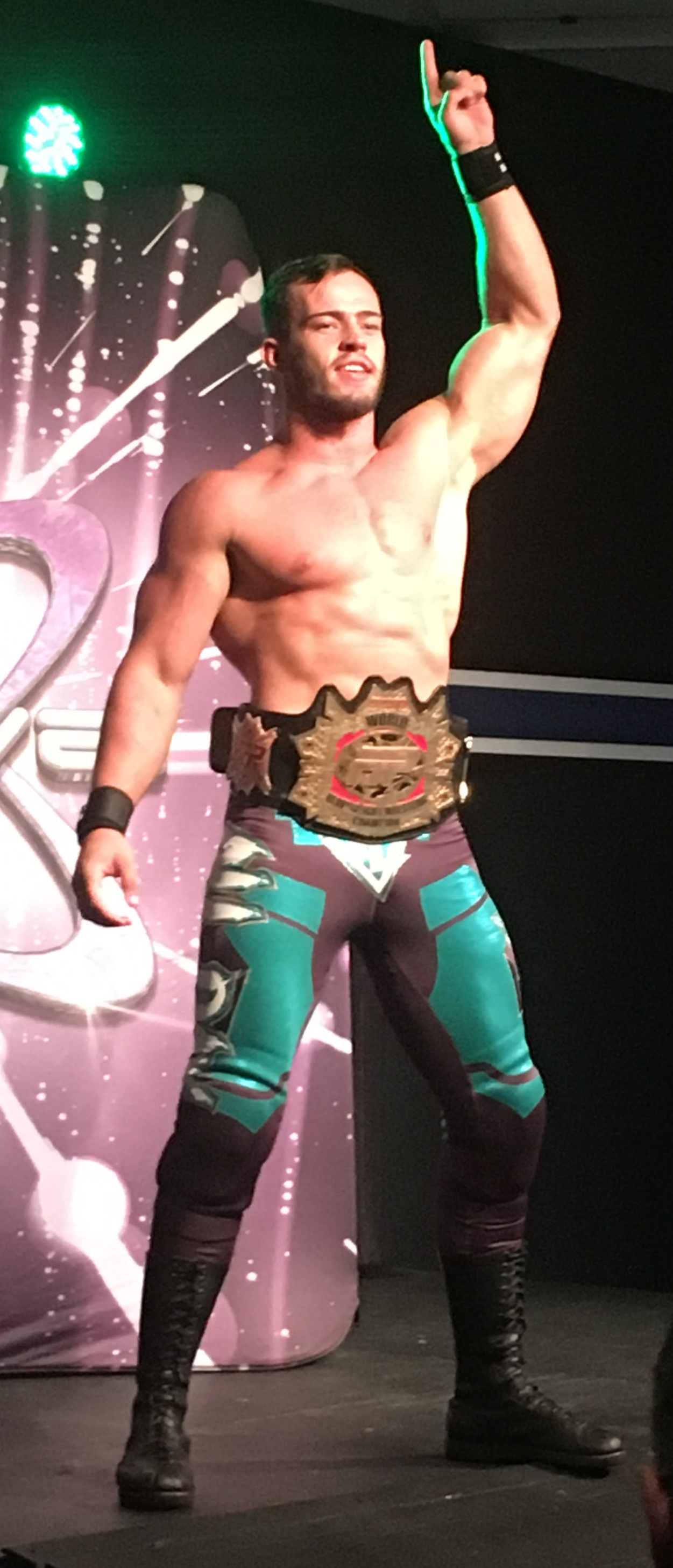
Austin Theory wearing the FIP World Heavyweight Championship in 2018

Over the years, Full Impact Pro has established a series of recurring shows that they produce almost every year they have been active. Starting in 2004, FIP has held the "Florida Rumble," often highlighted by FIP's version of the Royal Rumble match, with the winner becoming the number one contender for the FIP World Heavyweight Championship. Early in the year they usually hold a show billed as "New Year's Class" and also used show names such as "Fallout," "Everything Burns," "Heatstroke," "Declaration of Independence" and "Violence is the Answer" on multiple occasions.

From 2009 through 2011, FIP hosted the annual Jeff Peterson Memorial Cup tournament, an annual tournament held over several nights. In 2009, Davey Richards defeated Silas Young to win the tournament. In 2010, Sami Callihan won the 32-man tournament by defeating Jon Moxley in the finals. A. R. Fox defeat Johnny Gargano to win the 2011 tournament. In both 2007 and 2009, honored long time Championship Wrestling from Florida promoter Eddie Graham by holding the "Eddie Graham Memorial Battle of the Belts," using the name of one of Graham's major shows. While working with Ring of Honor, FIP co-promoted the show "Impact of Honor" on June 10, 2006. In 2006, 2007 and 2010, FIP promoted a show called "Cage of Pain" (I, II and III respectively) with each show featuring a steel cage match.

== Championships ==
Championship	Current champion(s)	Reign	Date won	Days held	Location	Notes	Ref.
World Heavyweight Championship	August Artois	1	December 10, 2023	1,046	Clearwater, FL	Defeated Brian Brock in a bullrope match at WWN Supershow: Battle of the Belts.	
Florida Heritage Championship	Sage Scott	1	December 14, 2025	311	Clearwater, FL	Defeated Rich Port Ayala in a Ecstasy Of Gold match at WWN Supershow: Battle Of The Belts.	
World Tag Team Championship	Annihiliation (Chungus and Syther)	3	December 14, 2025	311	Clearwater, FL	Defeated The Emerald Empire (Devin Diaz & Jonathan Hudson) at WWN Supershow: Battle Of The Belts.	

== Triple Crown ==
Full Impact Pro defines a "Triple Crown" winner as someone who has held every championship in Full Impact Pro at some point in their career. To date, only two wrestlers have won the FIP Triple Crown, Erick Stevens, achieving it when he won the FIP Florida Heritage Championship on December 20, 2008, and Jon Davis.

Champion	World Heavyweight Championship	World Tag Team Championship	Florida Heritage Championship
Erick Stevens	December 30, 2007	December 20, 2008 (with Roderick Strong)	March 10, 2007
Jon Davis	February 1, 2013	July 31, 2010 (with Kory Chavis)	April 2, 2017

== See also ==
- List of independent wrestling promotions in the United States
