= List of former Future of Wrestling personnel =

Future of Wrestling was a professional wrestling promotion based in Fort Lauderdale, Florida from 1998 to 2003 and in Davie, Florida from 2011 to 2013. Former employees in FOW consisted of professional wrestlers, managers, play-by-play and color commentators, announcers, interviewers and referees.

== Alumni ==
=== Male wrestlers ===
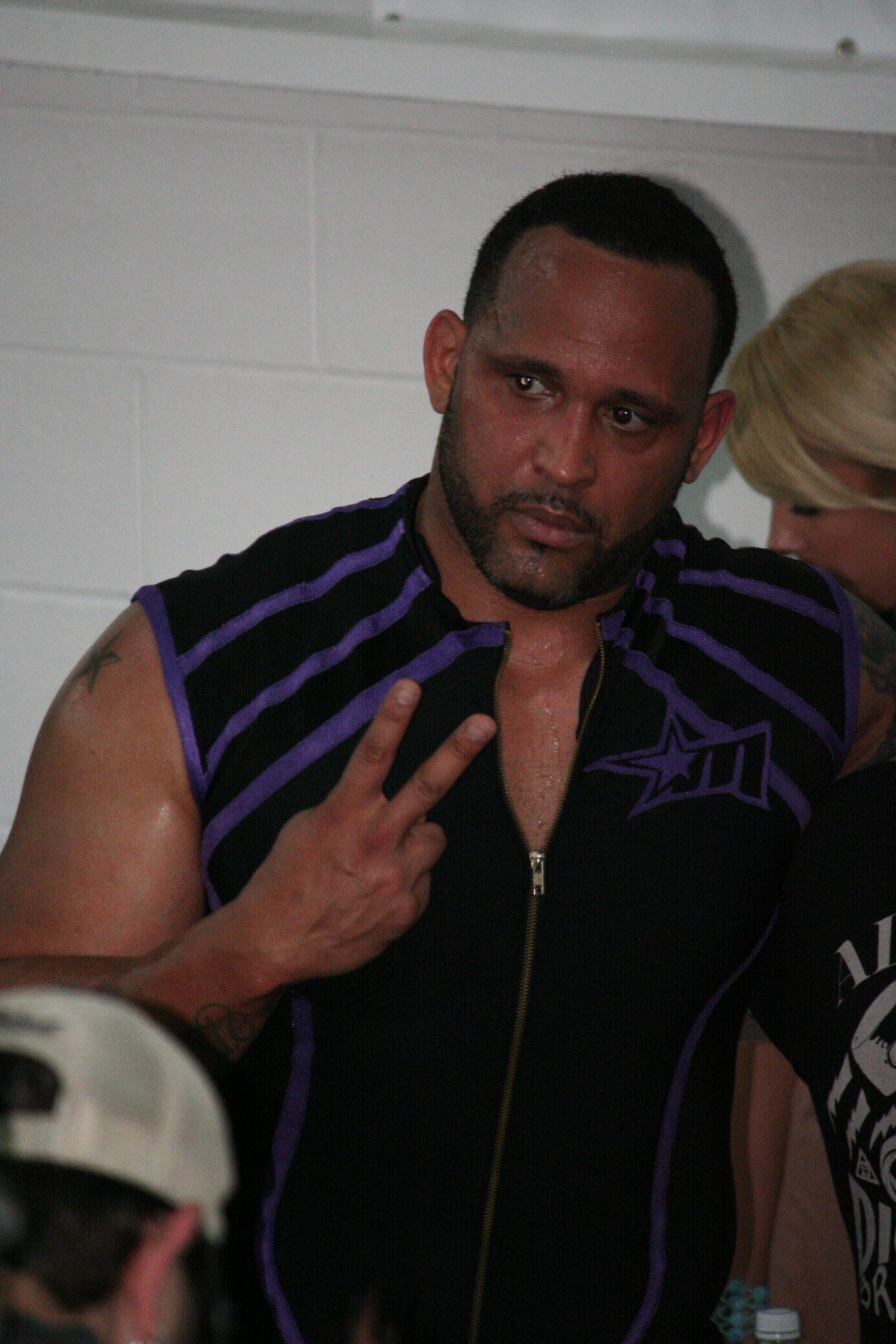
Antonio Banks

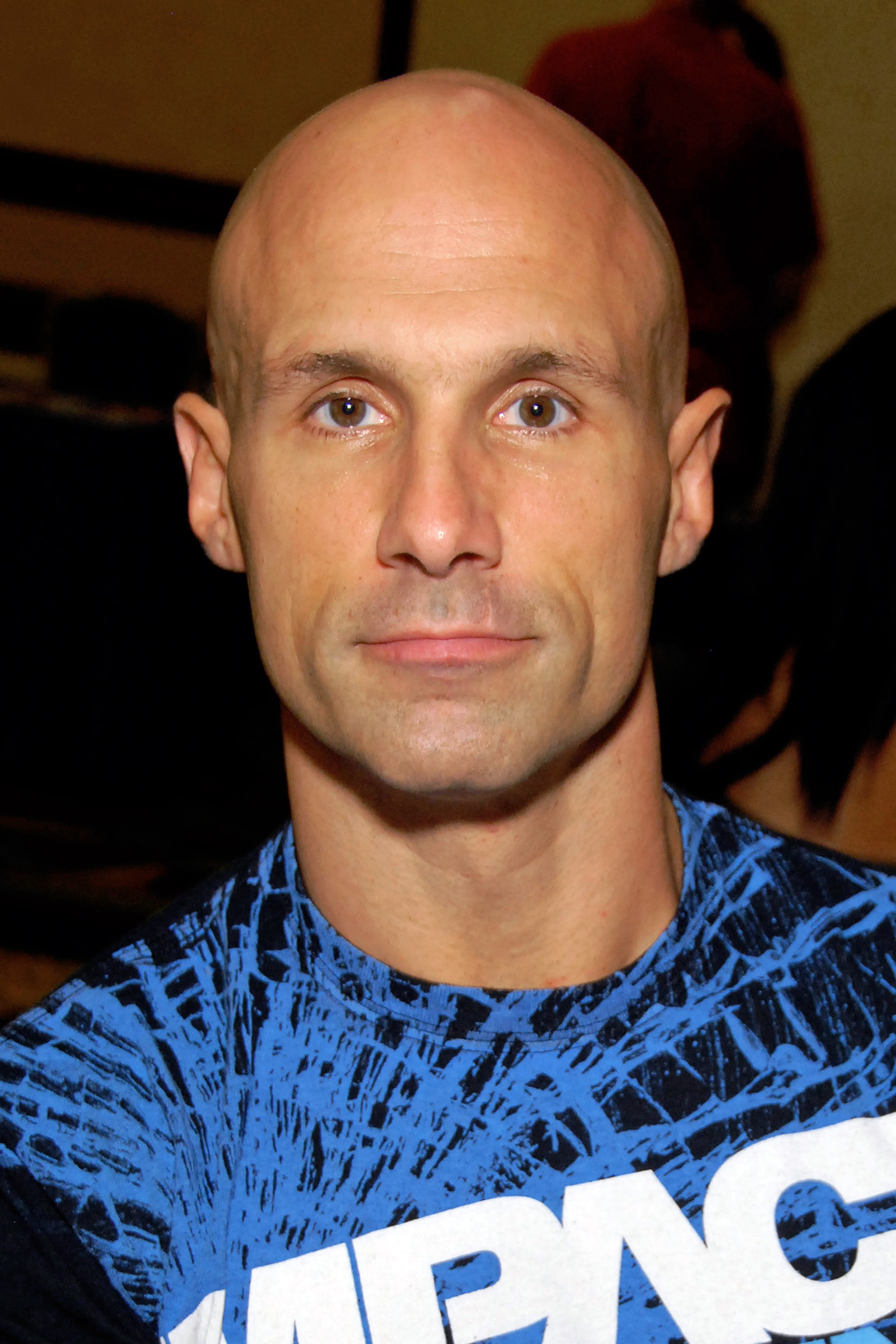
Christopher Daniels

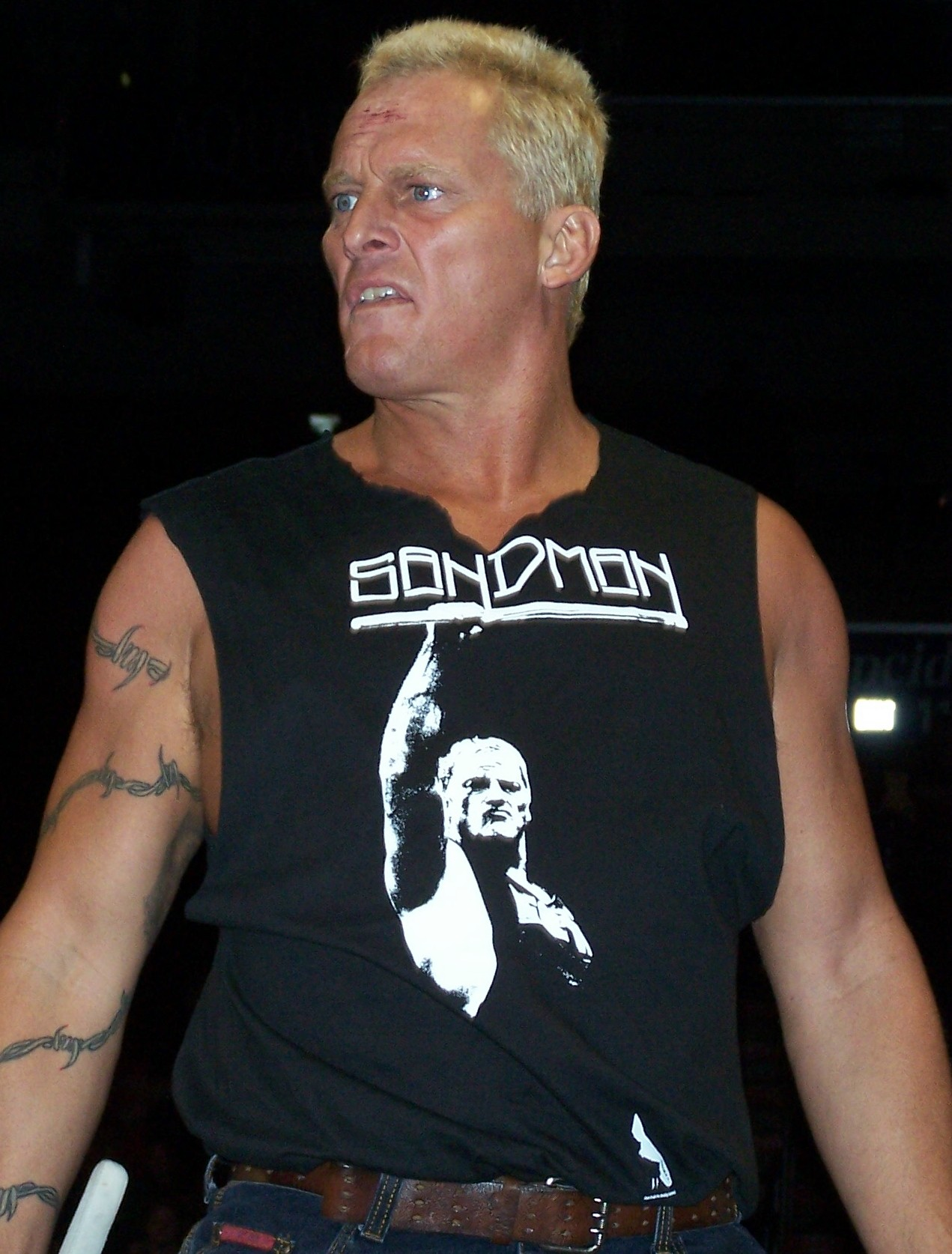
The Sandman

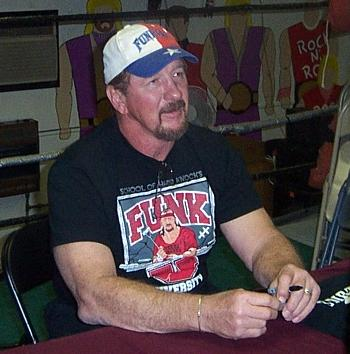
Terry Funk

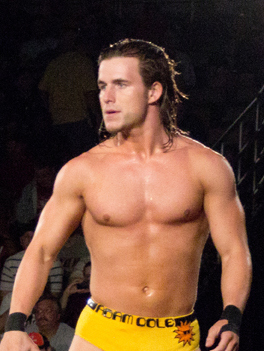
Adam Cole

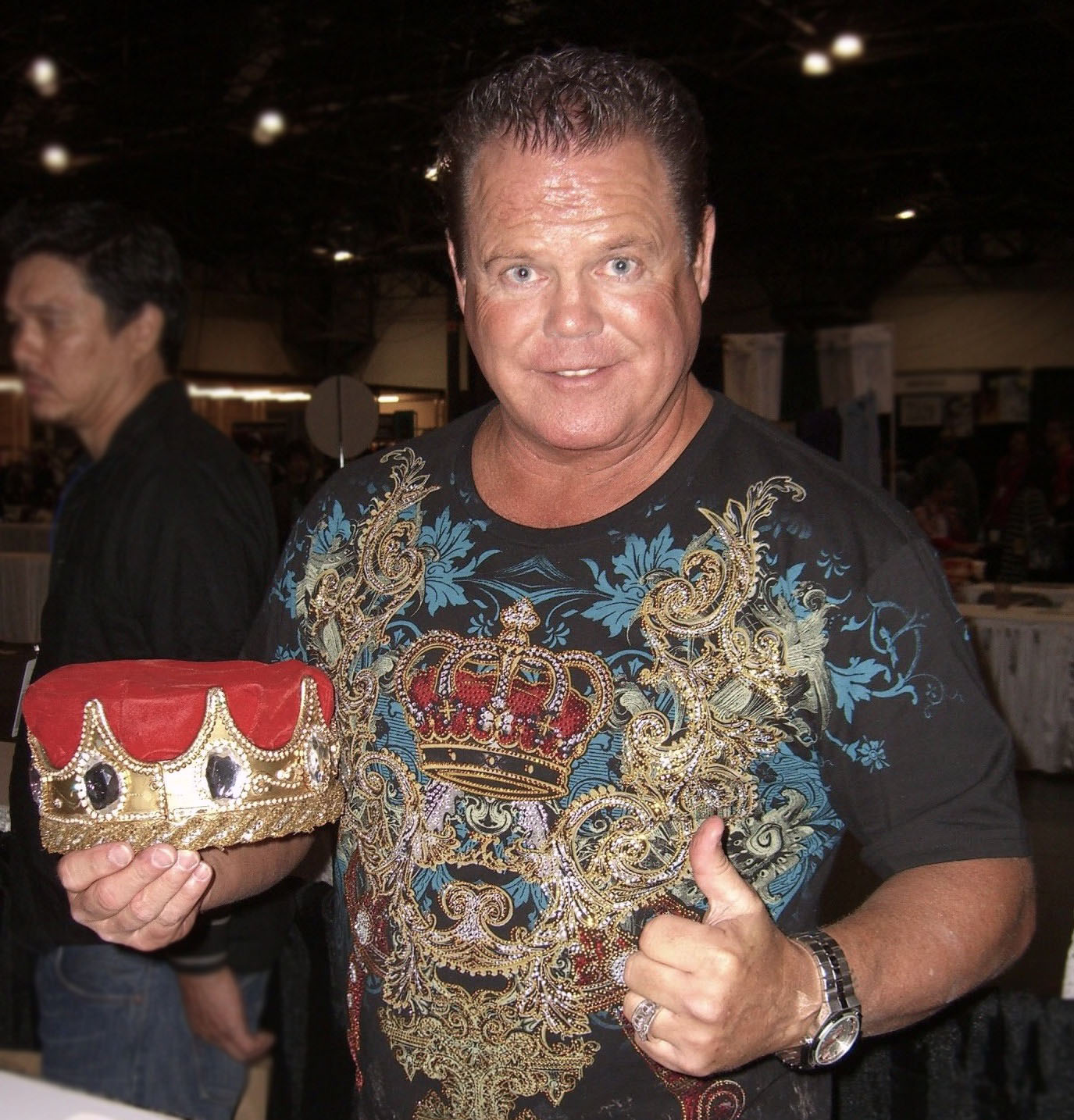
Jerry Lawler

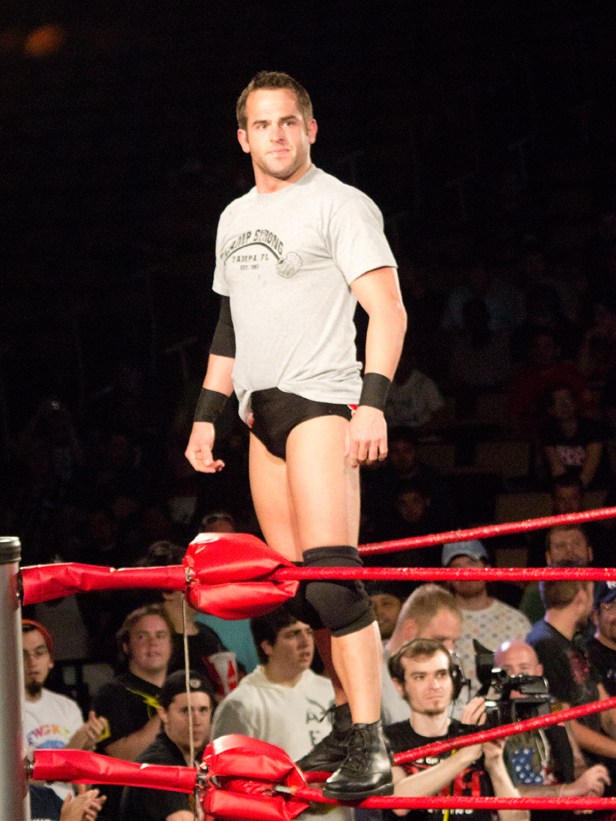
Roderick Strong

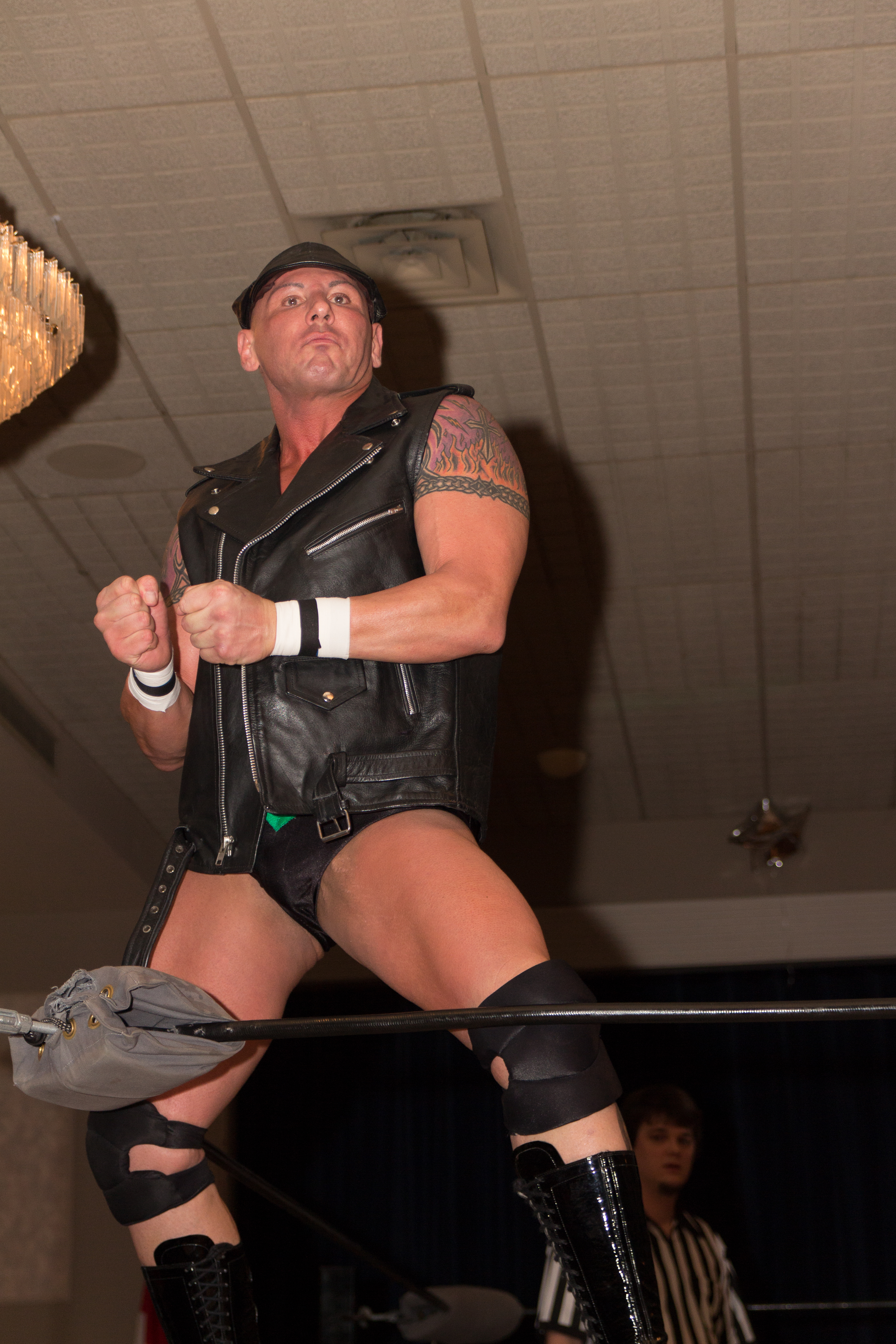
Big Vito

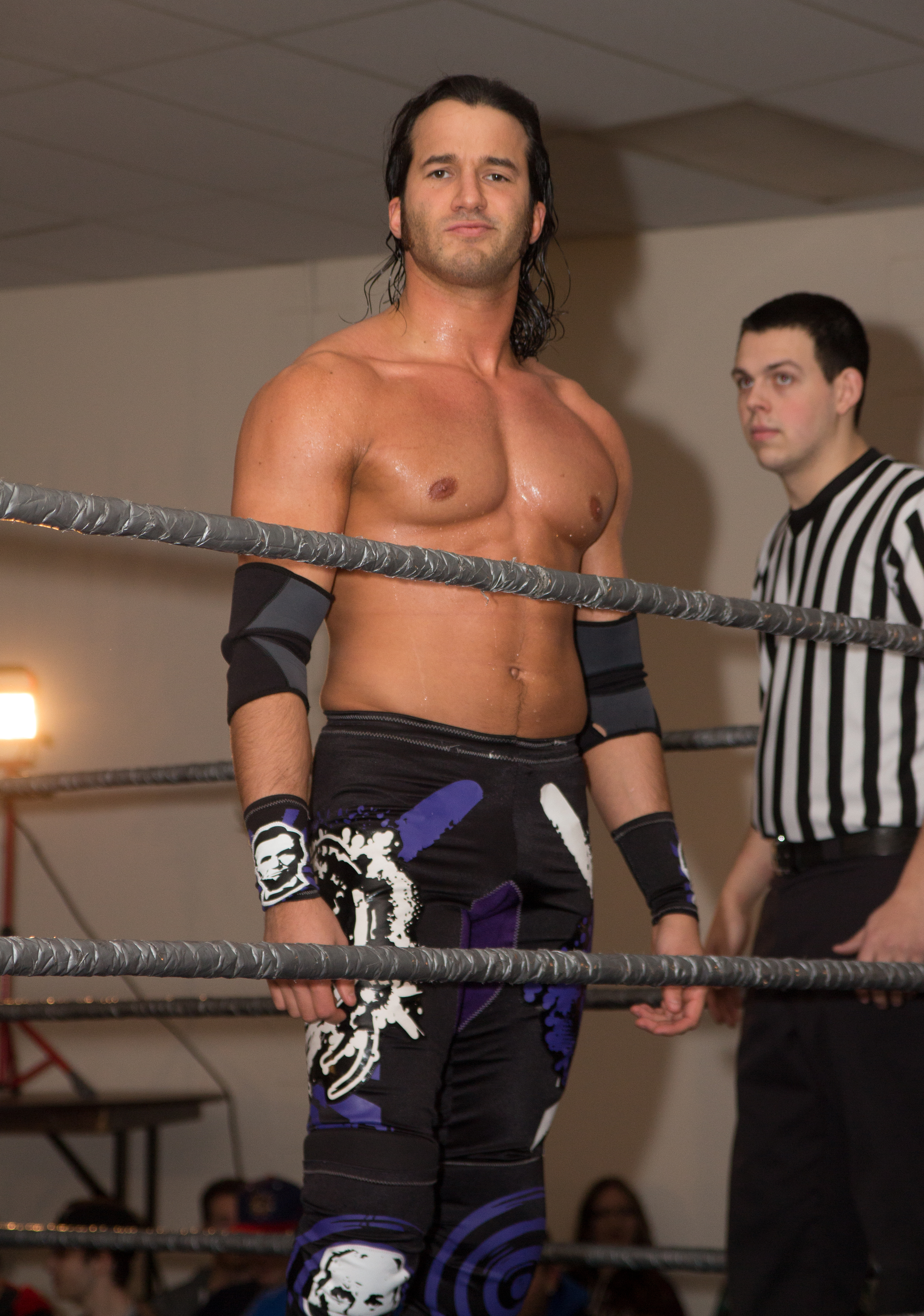
Trent Barreta

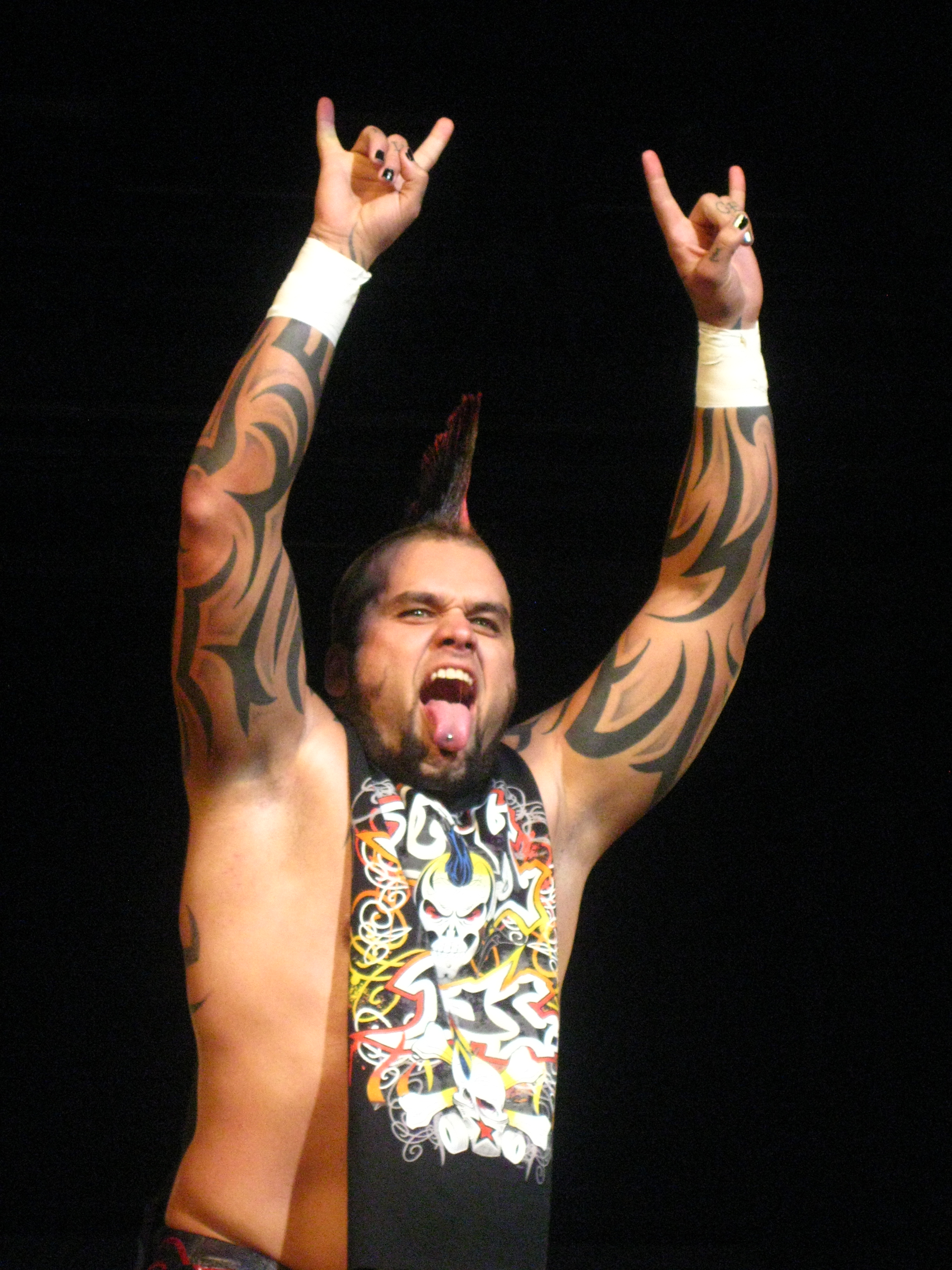
Jesse Neal

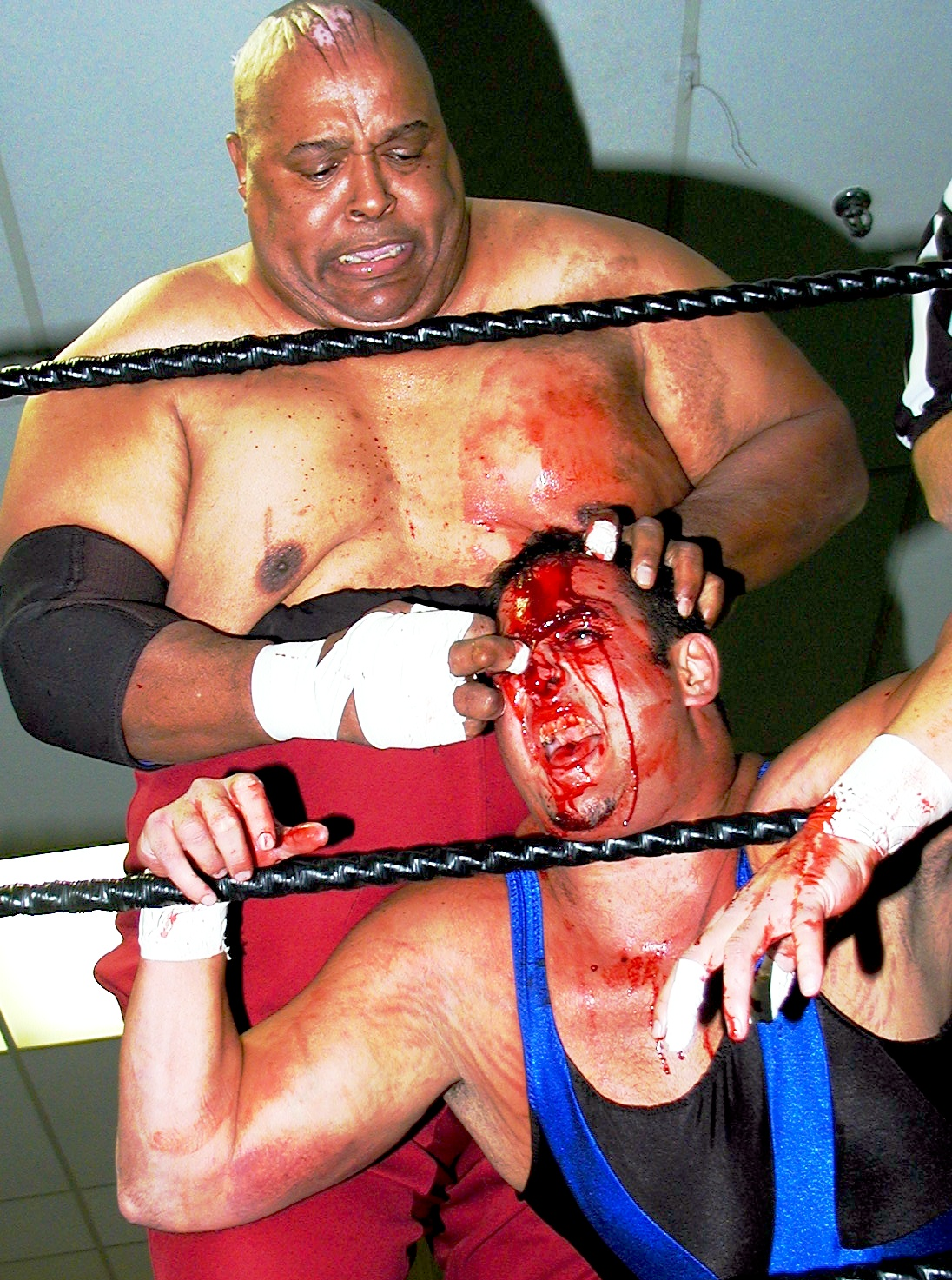
Abdullah the Butcher

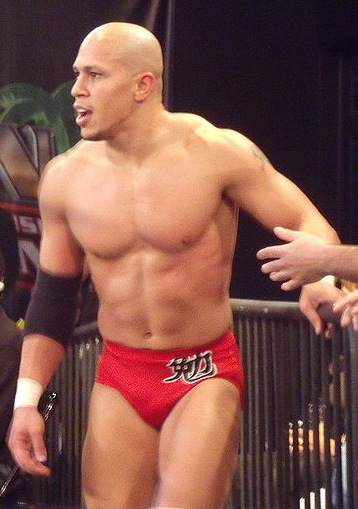
Low Ki

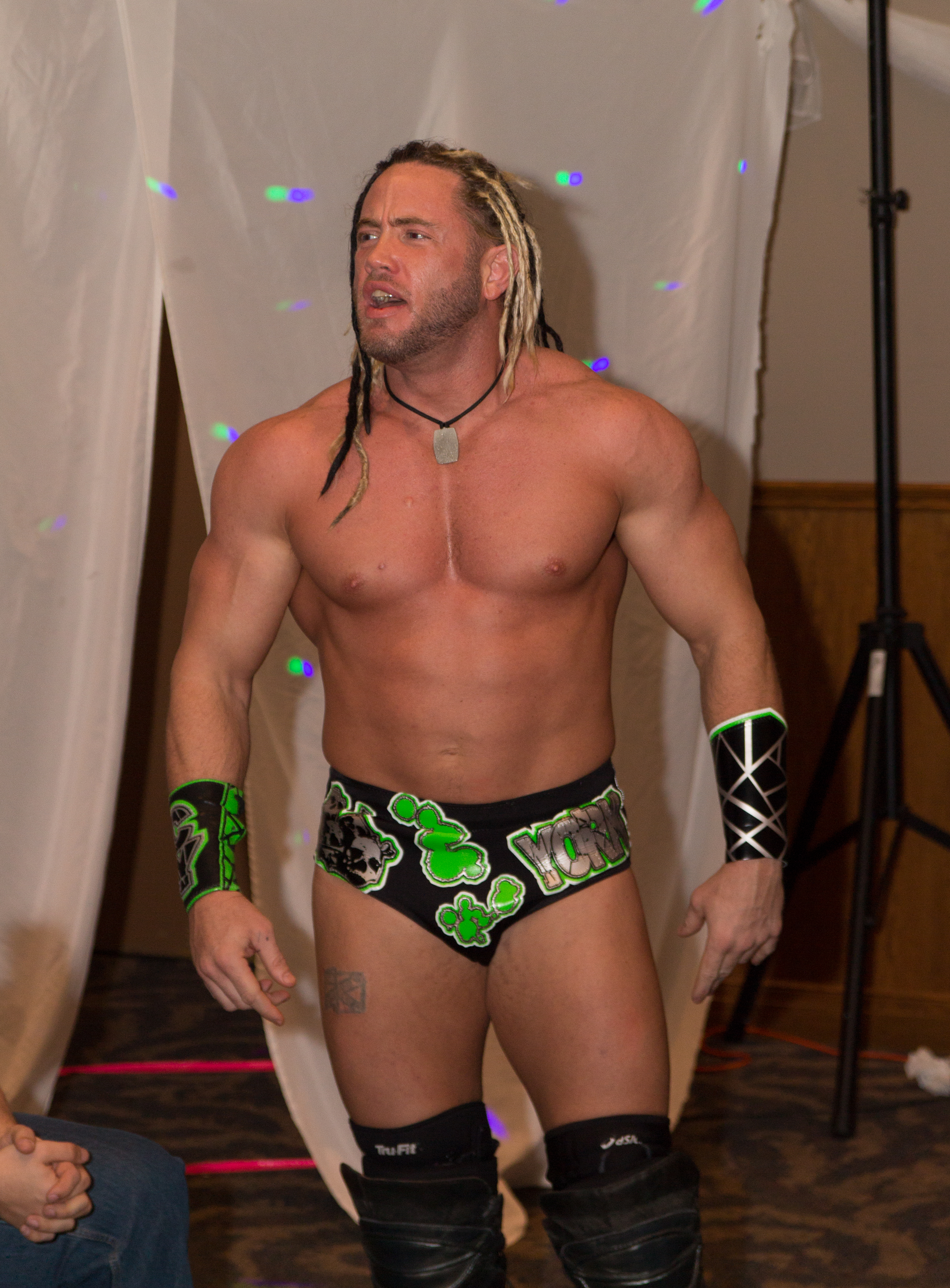
Christian York

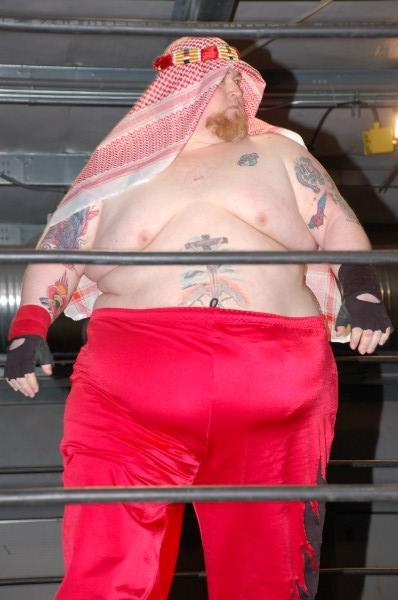
Maximum Capacity

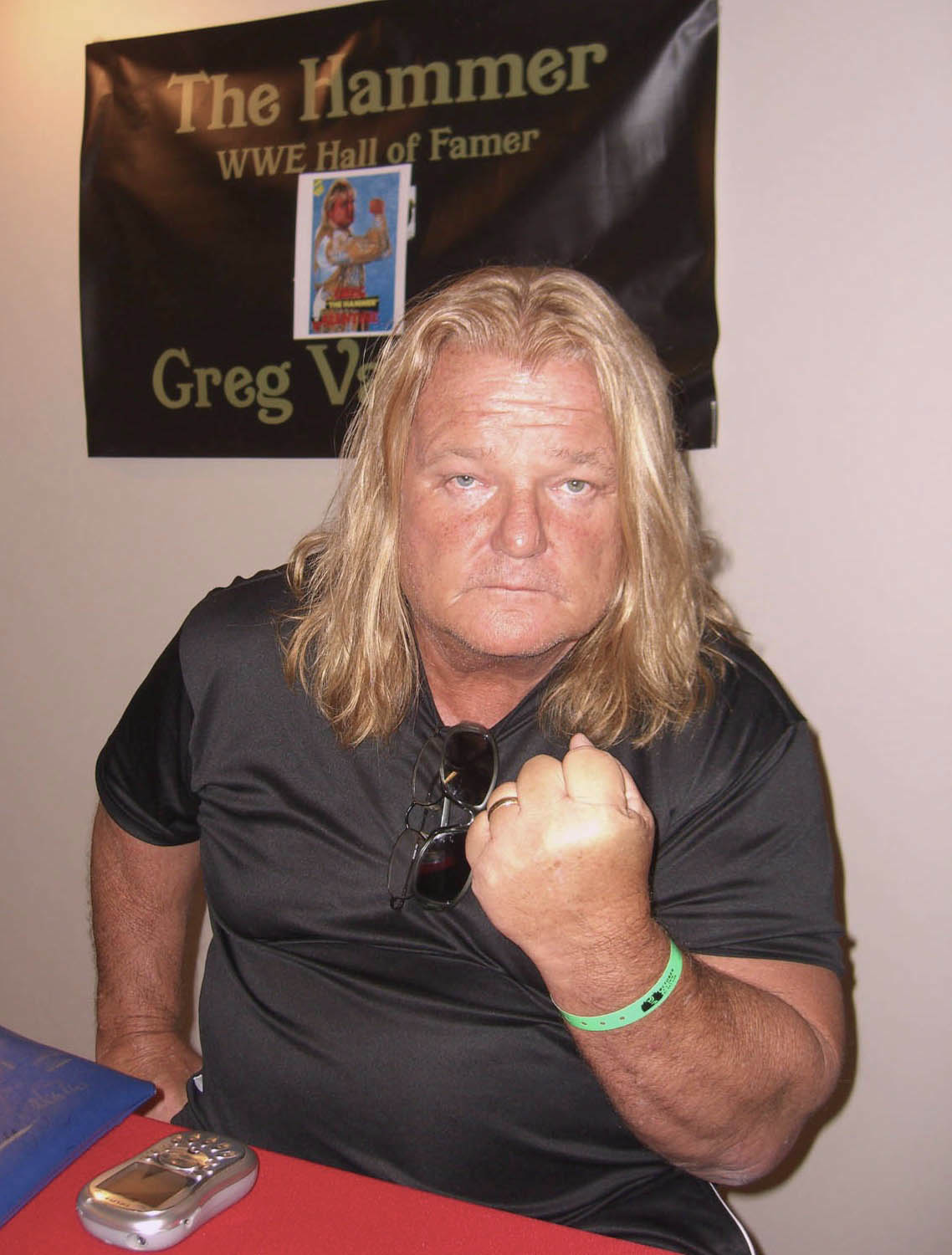
Greg Valentine

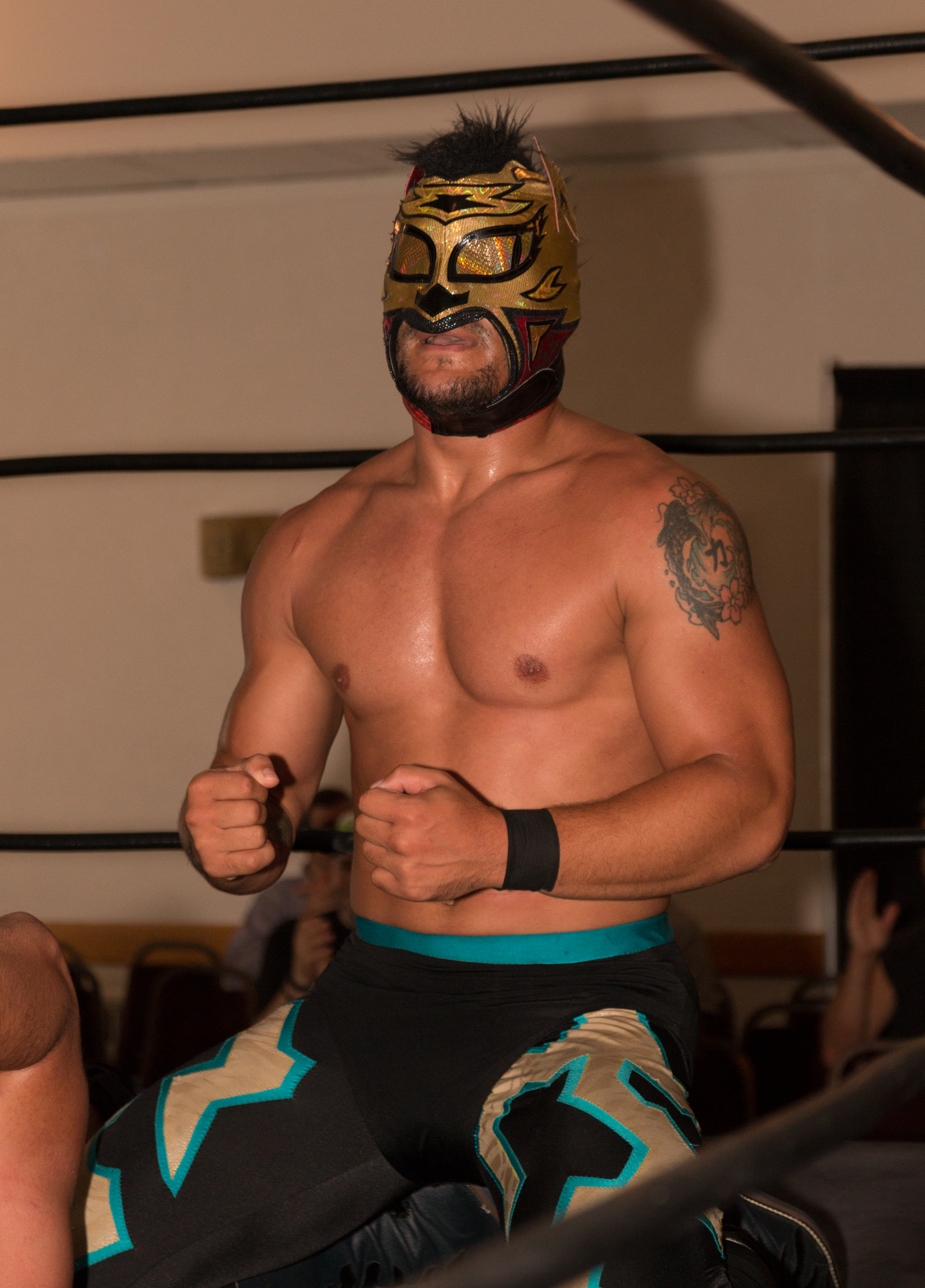
Lince Dorado

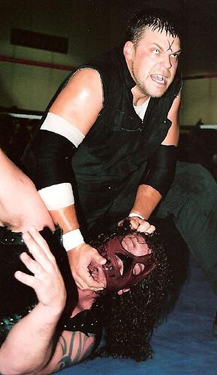
Michael Sain

Birth name:	Ring name(s):	Tenure:	Notes
Shawn Ambrosino	NASDAQ	1999–2002	
Nick Berger	Tony Apollo	1999	
Adam Birch	Joey Matthews	2002	
Larry Brannon	Vivacious Vito	2001	
Jeff Brazzle	JB Cool	1999, 2012	
Dennis Bunt	Dirty Dennis Allen	1998–2002, 2011–2012	
Alvin Burke Jr.	Antonio Banks	2001–2002	
Joseph Cabibbo	Dow Jones	1999–2002	
David Canal	The Cuban Assassin	1999, 2002	
Christopher Chavis	Tatanka	1998–2000	
Aleksander Chekov	Aleksander Chekov / Alex Chamberlain	2011–2013	
Craig Cohn	Craig Classic	2011	
Daniel Covell	Christopher Daniels	2002	
Michael Deek	Anthony Michaels / Snot Dudley	1998–2002, 2011–2013	
Drake Dexton	Warlock	1999–2001	
Michael Droese	Duke Droese	1999–2000	
Jim Fullington	The Sandman	2001–2002	
Terry Funk	Terry Funk	2002	
Jeff Gardner	Abudadein	2001–2002, 2012	
Alex Gibson	Alex G	1998–2000	
Michael Gossett^{†}	Mike Graham	2002	
Donald Haviland^{†}	Hack Meyers	1998–2002	
Curtis Hennig^{‡}	Curt Hennig	2002	
Barry Horowitz	Barry Horowitz	2001–2002	
Fredrick Jannetty	Marty Jannetty	1999, 2001	
Austin Jenkins	Adam Cole	2013	
Dave Johnson	The Blackheart / Dave Johnson	1999–2002	
Steve Keirn	Steve Keirn	2000	
Kurt Koski^{†}	Rusty Brooks / Masked Assassin I	1998–2002	
Neil Krause	Blain Rage	2012	
Stan Lane	Stan Lane	2000	
Ernesto Lara	Mykal Manix	2011–2012	
Jerry Lawler	Jerry "The King" Lawler	2001	
Chris Lindsey	Roderick Strong	2013	
Vito LoGrasso	Big Vito	2013	
Alex Lovett	Yuel Lovett	1999	
Gregory Marasciulo	Trent Barreta	2013	
Aron McCoy	Aron Agony / Justin Sain	2012–2013	
Mike Moran	Mean Mike	1998–2000	
Dan Morrison	Danny Doring	2002	
Jesse Neal	Jesse Neal	2012–2013	
Jonathan Ortagun	Johnny Vandal	2001–2002, 2011–2013	
Fred Ottman	Typhoon	2000	
Frankie Pérez	Frankie Pérez	2012–2013	
Luc Poirier	Sniper	1999	
Chasyn Rance	Chasyn Rance	1999, 2002, 2012–2013	
Patrick Richmond	Pat McGuire	1998–2001	
Johnny Rivera	Johnny Rivera	1998	
Bryan Rogers	Triple B	2012	
Christopher Rogers	CPR	2012	
Jeff Roth	Jeff Roth / Schmuck Dudley	1998–2002	
Virgil Runnels Jr.^{†}	Dusty Rhodes	2002	
Michael Rapuano	Bobby Rogers	1998–2002, 2012	
Glen Ruth	Thrasher	2011–2013	
Bruce Santee	Agent Steele	2002	
Bruno Sassi	Bruno Sassi	1998–2002	
Jeff Schniers	J-Dawg	1998–1999, 2001–2002, 2011–2012	
Mike Shane	Biff Wentworth / Mike Shane	1999, 2002	
Todd Shane	Chaz Wentworth / Todd Shane	1999, 2002	
Larry Shreve	Abdullah the Butcher	2002	
Brandon Silvestry	Low Ki	2001–2002	
Norman Smiley	Norman Smiley	2002	
Peter Sobieski Jr.	Flex Armstrong	1998–1999	
Jason Spence	Christian York	2002	
Michael Stanco^{†}	Maximum Capacity	2001–2002, 2011	
David Strawn	Skull Murphy Jr.	1999	
Kevin Sullivan	Kevin Sullivan	2002	
James Tilquist	Big Tilly	1998–2002	
John Tenta^{†}	Earthquake	2000	
Christopher Tipton	Casanova Chris	2001	
Jayson Villanueva	JoJo	2012–2013	
Andrew Warner	Scoot Andrews	1998–2002	
Charles Warrington	Mosh	2011–2013	
Jonathan Wisniski	Greg "The Hammer" Valentine	1998–1999	
Unknown	Adrian Alex	2013	
Unknown	Adrian Marx	2011–2012	
Unknown	Aero Italiano	2011	
Unknown	Al Bino / Milo Beasley / Naphtali	2000–2002, 2012–2013	
Unknown	Amazing Puma	2012	
Unknown	Andrew D. Dawson	2011–2012	
Unknown	Anthony Adonis	1998–2001	
Unknown	Bad Dog / Bad Dog Bullock	2002, 2012	
Unknown	Barney Rumble	2011	
Unknown	Barrington Hughes	2012–2013	
Unknown	Beast / Beastly Brody	2011–2013	
Unknown	Big Daddy Gonzo	2001–2002, 2011–2012	
Unknown	Big Mac Daddy	2000–2001	
Unknown	Biggs	2011	
Unknown	Billy Fives	1998–2002, 2011	
Unknown	Blare Rogers	1998–1999, 2002, 2012	
Victor McConnell	Bobby Brooks / Masked Assassin II	1998–2002	
Unknown	Bobby Sanford	2011	
Unknown	Bobby Wohlfert	2012	
Unknown	The Bomb	1999	
Unknown	Bryan Jordan	2002	
Unknown	Bucky Wells	2012–2013	
Unknown	Casey Thompson / Pesticide Pete	1999–2002, 2011	
Unknown	Chaka	2002	
Unknown	Charlie Lyle	2001	
Unknown	Chico Adams	2012–2013	
Unknown	Chief Whitecloud	1998	
Unknown	Chris Charger	1999–2002, 2011	
Unknown	Chris Jones	2011	
Unknown	Chris Solar	2012	
Unknown	Chunk	2012	
Unknown	Cliff Anderson / Dead Bug Joe	1999–2002	
Unknown	Commander Magnum	1999–2000	
Unknown	Corporal Mayham	1998	
Unknown	Cyborg	1999	
Unknown	Dale	2012	
Unknown	Damien Demura	2012	
Unknown	Dan Evans	2000, 2002	
Unknown	Daniel Modem	2011–2012	
Unknown	Daron Smythe	2013	
Unknown	Dash Maverick	2011–2012	
Unknown	David Babylon	2002	
Unknown	David Sun	1999	
Unknown	Derek Allen	2000–2001	
Unknown	Derek Drexl	2012–2013	
Unknown	Diablo Blanco	2013	
Unknown	Dirty Man Dempsey	2002	
Unknown	Doink the Clown	2000	
Unknown	Dok Rivers	2002	
Unknown	El Niche	2013	
Unknown	ERA / Ernest R. Alexander III	2011–2013	
Unknown	Eric Star	2001	
Unknown	Eric Storm	1999–2000, 2002, 2011–2012	
Unknown	Flex Magnum	1999–2002, 2011–2012	
Unknown	Frankie Capone / Francisco Ciatso	2002, 2011, 2013	
Unknown	Frankie Lancaster	2002	
Unknown	Freddie Laguardia	2002	
Unknown	Freedom Warrior	1999	
Unknown	Gary Steele	2000	
Unknown	Gary Thunder	2000, 2011	
Unknown	Gator B. Long	1999–2000	
Unknown	The Giant Puma	2013	
Unknown	Harry Venis	1998–2002	
Unknown	I Believe Student #1	2012	
Unknown	Iron	1999	
Unknown	Jack Zero	2011	
Unknown	Jason Rage	1998–1999	
Unknown	Jason Trade	2011	
Unknown	Jay Hargrave	2002	
Unknown	Jay Kraken	2011–2012	
Unknown	JD Amazing	2012	
Unknown	Jed Diamond	1998	
Unknown	Jim Jordan	2012–2013	
Unknown	Jim Varsallone	2001	
Unknown	Jimmy Love	2001	
Unknown	JJ Kodiak	2001–2002	
Unknown	Joey Saint	2011–2012	
Unknown	Johnny Craze	2000	
Unknown	Johnny Evans / Ram Man	1998, 2001–2002, 2011	
Unknown	Johnny Velvet	2011	
Unknown	The Joker	2011–2012	
Unknown	Jon Elias	1998–2001	
Unknown	Jordan Rayner	2011–2013	
Unknown	J.R. James	1998–2000, 2011	
Unknown	JR Ryder	2001	
Unknown	JT Flash	2011–2013	
Unknown	Justice	2002	
Unknown	Kennedy Kendrick	2012	
Unknown	Kory Chavis	2013	
Unknown	Larry Lane	1999–2002, 2011	
Unknown	Les Adams	2000	
Unknown	Lince Dorado	2012	
Unknown	Lowell Brown	2002	
Unknown	Lynx	2013	
Unknown	Major Havoc	1998	
Unknown	Mario	1999	
Unknown	Mark Zout	2011	
Unknown	Martial Law	1999	
Unknown	Maxx Stardom	2011–2013	
Unknown	MDK	2012–2013	
Unknown	Mike Cruz	2013	
Unknown	Mike Monroe	1999, 2011–2013	
Unknown	Mike Styles	2002	
Unknown	Mike Sullivan	2001–2002	
Unknown	Mikhail Ivanov / Michael Sain	2011–2013	
Unknown	Mr. America	1999	
Unknown	Mr. New York	1998–1999, 2012	
Unknown	Motown Moore	1998	
Unknown	Mystic Warrior	2012	
Unknown	Nick Narcisstic	2002	
Unknown	Niedaduba	2012	
Unknown	Noel Mercy	1999–2000	
Unknown	Patrick Leizer	2000	
Unknown	The Perfect Creation	2000	
Unknown	Pete Cannon	2011	
Unknown	Phil Davis	2011–2012	
Unknown	The Postman	1999	
Unknown	Prince Ali Khan	1998–1999	
Unknown	Punisher	2001–2002	
Unknown	Randy Crosswell	1999	
Unknown	Richard Hogan	1999	
Unknown	Ricky Turbo	2012–2013	
Unknown	Ricky Vandal	2000–2002, 2011–2012	
Unknown	Robin	2012	
Unknown	Rod Steel	2002	
Unknown	Roo-D Lewis	2012	
Unknown	Sean Allen / Tank Morgan	1998–2002, 2011–2013	
Unknown	Scott Sodergren	1999	
Unknown	Shane McLane	2011–2013	
Unknown	Shawn Prime	2011–2013	
Unknown	Sean Davis	2011–2012	
Unknown	Sean Phoenix	2011–2012	
Unknown	Shooter Storm	2011	
Unknown	Showtime	2002	
Unknown	Shred	1999–2001	
Unknown	Simon Sez	2013	
Unknown	The Soldier of Fortune	1999	
Unknown	Steel	1999	
Unknown	The Super Destroyer	1999	
Unknown	Terry Davis	2000–2001	
Unknown	T.J. Jackson	1998, 2011	
Unknown	Tommy Vandal	2000–2002, 2011–2013	
Unknown	Tony DeNucci	2002	
Unknown	Tre G	2012	
Unknown	Trevor Read	2011–2013	
Unknown	Trikki Nikki	1999	
Unknown	UNIT	2000	
Unknown	The Varsity Kid	2001	
Unknown	Victor Romanoff	2013	
Unknown	Vinnie Ramagucci	2011–2013	
Unknown	Vinny Vega	2012–2013	
Unknown	Walter Eaton	2012	
Unknown	Wayne Van Dyke	2011–2013	
Unknown	Wayne Wonder	2012	
Unknown	Wet Willie	1999–2001	

=== Female wrestlers ===
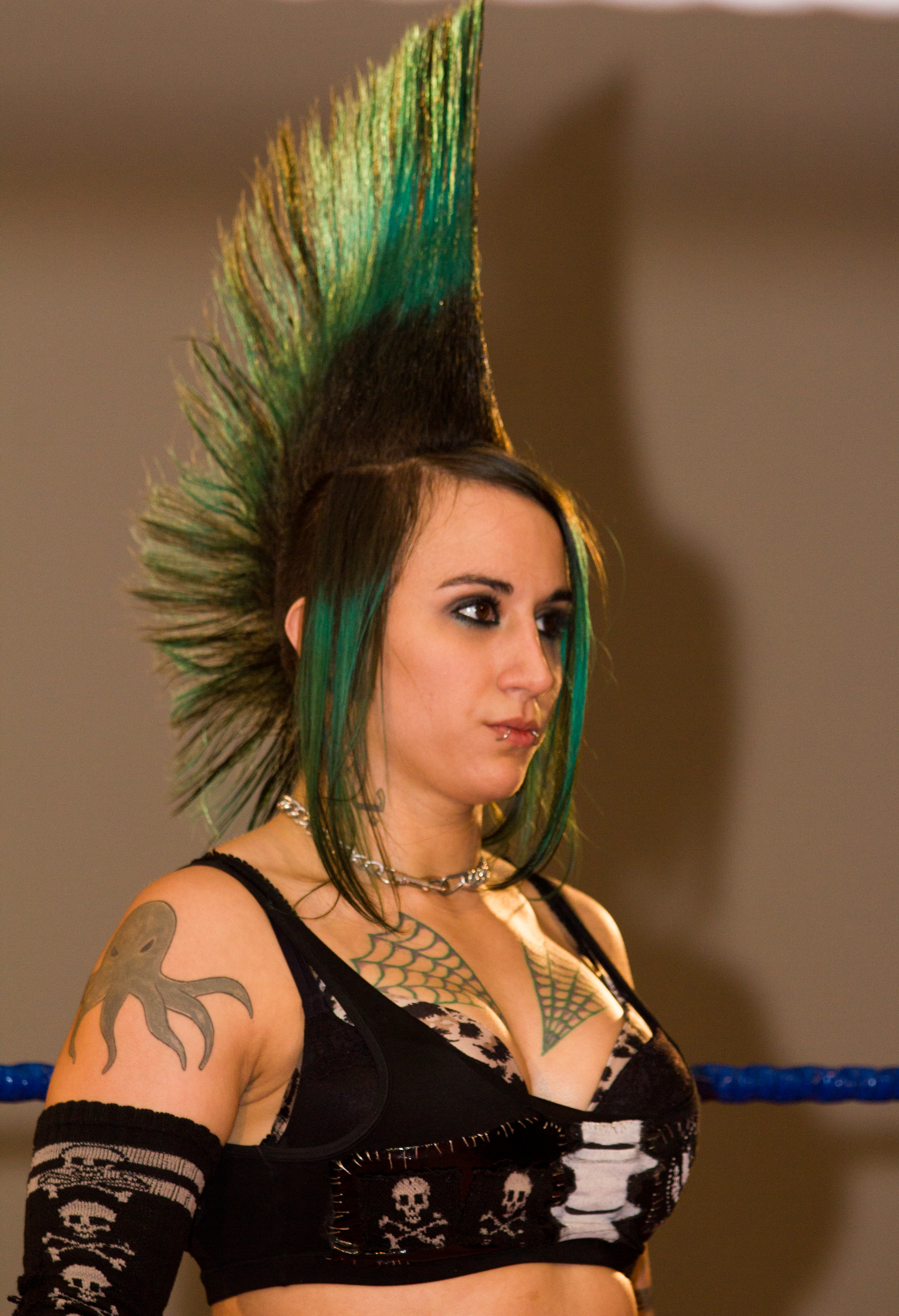
Christina Von Eerie

Birth name:	Ring name(s):	Tenure:	Notes
Stephanie Bell	Mia Yim	2013	
Amy Dumas	Angelica	1999	
Santana Garrett	Santana / Santana Garrett	2011–2013	
Mickie James	Alexis Laree	2002	
Christina Kardooni	Christina Von Eerie	2012	
Angel Orsini	Riptide	1999	
Nilka García Solís	La Rosa Negra	2012–2013	
Erika Shishido	Erica	1998	
Unknown	Amazona	2013	
Unknown	Angel Rose	2011, 2013	
Unknown	Dynamite DiDi	2013	
Unknown	Justine Silver	2012	
Unknown	Sienna DuVall	2012	
Unknown	Silhouette	2001–2002	

=== Stables and tag teams ===
Tag team/Stable(s)	Members	Tenure(s)
The Angry Nerds	Andrew D. Dawson and Daniel Modem	2011–2012
AOD	Sean Allen and Beast	2012
Animal House	Billy Fives, Chris Charger and Wildside	2001–2002
The Bushwhackers	Bushwhacker Luke and Bushwhacker Butch	
The Bad Street Boys	Christian York and Joey Matthews	2002
The Carolina Bombers	CPR and Triple B	2012
The Dirty Outlaws	Dennis Allen and JR James	2011
Double Deuce	Francisco Ciatso and Pete Cannon	2011
The Dudleys	Snot Dudley and Schmuck Dudley	1998–1999
The Exterminators	Casey Thompson and Cliff Anderson	1999–2001
The Extreme Militia	"Sycho" Sean Allen and Commodore Flex Magnum	1999
The Fabulous Ones	Stan Lane and Steve Keirn	2000
Florida Power & Lovin'	Tony Apollo, Anthony Adonis and Billy Fives	1999–2000
The Hardliners	Barrington Hughes and Jordan Rayner	2012
The Headbangers	Mosh and Thrasher	2011–2013
The Heartbreak Express	Phil Davis and Sean Davis	2011–2012
The Illuminati	Eric Storm, MDK, Shane McLane and Bucky Wells	2012–2013
The Latin Express		1998
Los Fugitivos de la Calle	El Niche and Lynx	2013
The Mad Crew	Alex Chamberlain and Michael Sain	2012
The Market Crashers	Dow Jones and NASDAQ	1999–2002
The Masked Assassins	Masked Assassin I and Masked Assassin II	1998
The Midnight Studs	Bobby Sanford and JT Flash	2011
The Natural Disasters	Earthquake and Typhoon	2000
The New Heavenly Bodies	Casanova Chris and Vivacious Vito	2001
1.21 Jiggawatts	Chris Jones and Ernest R. Alexander III	2011
Phi Delta Slam	Big Tilly and Bruno Sassi	1998–2002
Phi De Kappa U	Biff Wentworth and Chaz Wentworth	1999
Red Devil Fight Team	Mikhail Ivanov and Aleksander Chekov	2012–2013
Redneck Mafia	Big Daddy Gonzo and J.J. Kodiak	2002
The Rogers Brothers	Bobby Rogers and Blare Rogers	1998
The Royal Empire	Francisco Ciatso and Simon Sez	2013
The Scum of the Earth	Brian Brody and Joey Saint	2011
The Shane Twins	Mike Shane and Todd Shane	2002
The Sin City Sex Bombs	Ricky Turbo and Vinny Vega	2012–2013
Suicidal Tendencies	Dennis Allen and Sean Allen	2002, 2011–2012
The System	Maxx Stardom and Mykal Manix	2011–2012
The TECH Squad	Mike Monroe and Trevor Read	2011–2013
Thunder Storm	Eric Storm and Gary Thunder	2011
The TradeMarx	Adrian Marx and Jason Trade	2011
The Vandalz	Ricky Vandal and Tommy Vandal	2000–2002
The Waverunners	Shred and Wet Willie	1999–2001
Wildside	Jeff Roth and Anthony Michaels	1999–2002

=== Managers and valets ===
Birth name:	Ring name(s):	Tenure:	Notes
Bill Alfonso	Bill Alfonso	2001	
Stacy Carter	The Kat	2001	
Nick Mayberry	Nick Mayberry	2001–2002	
Amy Vitale	Amy Vitale	1998–2000	
Unknown	Fabulous Frank	1998–2001	
Unknown	Jodi X	1999–2002	
Unknown	"Honest" John Cheatum	2002	
Unknown	Lew Spectre	2000, 2002	
Unknown	Seth Gregg	2002, 2012	
Unknown	Silhouette	2001–2002	
Jeff Gardiner	Snakemaster Abudadein	2002	
Philip Kruh	Phil the Scumdog	1999	
Unknown	"Trillionaire" Ted Vernon	2012	

=== Commentators and interviewers ===
Birth name:	Ring name(s):	Tenure:	Notes
Rob Bitterman	Rob Bitterman		
Michael Faust	Fluff Michaels	1998	Ring announcer
Unknown	Fabulous Frank		
Unknown	Shannon Rose	2001–2002	

=== Referees ===
Birth name:	Ring name(s):	Tenure:	Notes
Unknown	Bruce Michaels		
Unknown	Chuck Aurin	2002, 2011–2012	
Unknown	Fernando The Ref		
Unknown	Joey Ska		Head referee

=== Other personnel ===
Birth name:	Ring name(s):	Tenure:	Notes
Lenny Berstein	Lenny Berstein		Official timekeeper
Mike Blake	Mike Blake	2002	FOW Commissioner
Duane Long	Duane Long		Official staff photographer
Michael Rapuano	Bobby Rogers	1998–2003, 2011–2013	Promoter

Notes
^{†} Indicates they are deceased
^{‡} Indicates they died while they were employed with Future of Wrestling
^{1} Indicates they were graduates from the School of Hard Knocks
