= Snot Dudley =

American professional wrestler (born 1970)

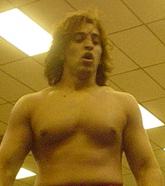
- Snot Dudley in September 2005

Personal information
- Born: Anthony LoMonaco; June 21, 1970 (age 56) Copiague, New York, US

Professional wrestling career
- Ring name(s): Anthony Michaels; Fire Snot Dudley
- Billed height: 6 ft 2 in (1.88 m)
- Billed weight: 253 lb (115 kg)
- Billed from: New York City, New York "The hills of Charleston, Pennsylvania" (ECW)
- Trained by: Tim Horner
- Debut: August 21, 1993
- Retired: 2020

Anthony LoMonaco (born June 21, 1970) is an American professional wrestler, currently wrestling on the independent circuit under the ring name Anthony Michaels. He is best known for his appearances with Extreme Championship Wrestling as a member of The Dudley Brothers under the ring name Snot Dudley in summer 1995. He is also known for his appearances with Smoky Mountain Wrestling in Tennessee and on the independent circuit in Florida and the northeastern United States.

== Professional wrestling career ==
=== Smoky Mountain Wrestling (1993–1995) ===
LoMonaco relocated from New York City to Morristown, Tennessee to train as a professional wrestler under Tim Horner at the Smoky Mountain Wrestling training camp. He made his debut with Smoky Mountain Wrestling on August 21, 1993 as "Anthony Michaels", losing to Joe Cazana.

In March 1994, LoMonaco was repackaged as the masked "Fire" and placed in a tag team with Brimstone called "The Infernos". The Infernos went on to compete in the SMW tag team division, competing against teams such as The Thrillseekers (Chris Jericho and Lance Storm) and The Rock 'n' Roll Express. LoMonaco alternated between the two ring names until leaving SMW in February 1995.

=== Extreme Championship Wrestling (1995) ===
LoMonaco debuted in the Philadelphia, Pennsylvania-based promotion Extreme Championship Wrestling on July 1, 1995 at Hardcore Heaven. Wearing overalls, a tie-dyed shirt, high-tops and glasses, LoMonaco was given the gimmick of "Lil' Snot Dudley", one of the three original members of The Dudley Brothers along with Dudley Dudley and Big Dick Dudley. In their debut match, Snot Dudley and Dudley Dudley scored an upset victory over The Pitbulls.

Shortly after their debut, the Dudley family aligned themselves with Raven, joining Raven's Nest and feuding with The Pitbulls. At Heat Wave on July 15, 1995, Dudley Dudley and Snot Dudley teamed with Raven in a loss to Tommy Dreamer and The Pitbulls. Shortly thereafter, LoMonaco was injured in a jet ski accident and left ECW, with his departure attributed to a broken pelvis resulting from a superbomb delivered by The Pitbulls at Heat Wave.

=== Florida promotions (1995–2003) ===
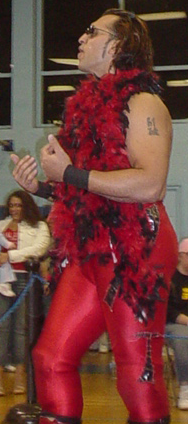
Dudley approaching the ring in September 2005

After recovering from his injury, LoMonaco returned to wrestling on the independent circuit in Florida. In 1998, LoMonaco formed a tag team with Jeff Roth, who adopted the ring name "Schmuck Dudley". The duo wrestled for the Florida-based Future of Wrestling promotion as "The Dudleys". In 1999, LoMonaco reverted to the ring name Anthony Michaels and Schmuck to Jeff Roth, changing the name of their tag team to "Wildside", then to "Animal House". The duo won the FOW Tag Team Championship on three occasions between 1998 and 2002. LoMonaco remained with FOW until the promotion folded in 2003. LoMonaco also wrestled for other independent promotions in Florida such as Florida Championship Wrestling and Coastal Championship Wrestling.

=== Later career (2003–2020) ===
In 2003, LoMonaco joined the Pennsylvania-based promotion World Xtreme Wrestling, where he formed a tag team with Mark Gore called "The Untouchables". The duo won the WXW Tag Team Championship in May 2004, holding the titles until August of that year. The Untouchables continued to wrestled intermittently for WXW over the following eight years. The duo also performed for other independent promotions in the northeastern United States such as the Connecticut-based Defiant Pro Wrestling and the Massachusetts-based Powerhouse Wrestling.

In 2010, LoMonaco returned to the Future of Wrestling promotion after it was resurrected, repeatedly challenging for the FOW Heavyweight Championship and the FOW International Heavyweight Championship. In December 2012, LoMonaco and The Beast won the FOW Tag Team Championship, marking LoMonaco's fourth reign with the championship.

On November 9, 2013, LoMonaco and several other ECW alumni took part in a 22 wrestler "hardcore rumble" for Tommy Dreamer's House of Hardcore promotion in Poughkeepsie, New York. Afterwards, he took a hiatus from wrestling.

In 2018, LoMonaco returned to wrestling as Anthony Michaels with Mark Gore as the Untouchables. LoMonaco retired from wrestling in 2020.

== Personal life ==
LoMonaco is an avid guitar player. While wrestling for Smoky Mountain Wrestling in Tennessee in the early 1990s, he formed a two-piece glam rock band called "Slippery Nipple" with his roommate and fellow wrestler Chris Jericho as bassist.

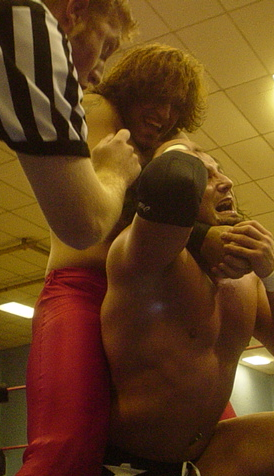
Dudley applying a chinlock to Bobby Fish

== Championships and accomplishments ==
- Coastal Championship Wrestling
  - CCW Tag Team Championship (2 times) – with Jeff Roth
- Defiant Pro Wrestling
  - DPW Tag Team Championship (2 times) - with Mark Gore
- Florida Championship Wrestling
  - FCW Caribbean Islands Championship (1 time)
  - FCW Heavyweight Championship (1 time)
  - FCW Tag Team Championship (3 times) – with Schmuck Dudley / Jeff Roth
- Future of Wrestling
  - FOW Tag Team Championship (4 times) – with Schmuck Dudley / Jeff Roth (3 times) and The Beast (1 time)
- World Xtreme Wrestling
  - WXW Tag Team Championship (1 time) – with Mark Gore
