= Soulman Alex G =

American professional wrestler (born 1970)

Personal information
- Born: Alex Gibson Miami, Florida, U.S.
- Education: University of Michigan

Professional wrestling career
- Ring name: Alex G
- Billed height: 5 ft 8 in (1.73 m)
- Billed weight: 220 lb (100 kg)
- Billed from: Miami, Florida
- Trained by: Boris Malenko
- Debut: 1987

Alex Gibson (April 21, 1970) is an American professional wrestler better known as "Soulman" Alex G. He is one of the two trainers who trained former WWE United States champion Montel Vontavious Porter and former NXT Tag Team champion Konnor.

== Amateur career ==
Gibson first started out as an amateur wrestler in Middle School. By the time he got to North Miami High School he was ready to succeed in the high school ranks. He made it to the state tournament his sophomore year, and eventually went on to win the state championship in the 140-pound weight class. He then attended the University of Michigan on a wrestling scholarship.

== Professional wrestling career ==
He started his professional wrestling training in his 20s under "The littlest man" Boris Malenko in Tampa, Florida, making the drive every weekend from Miami. Gibson trained alongside legends like X-Pac, Dean and Joe Malenko, Dynamite Dave Perry, Tom Nash (1/2 of the Blackhearts), “Black Magic” Norman Smiley, and Gangrel.

On May 5, 1995, Soulman made an appearance at the War Memorial Auditorium for Extreme Championship Wrestling in a losing effort against Joe Malenko. Other promotions that he has worked for include World Championship Wrestling, the Global Wrestling Alliance (an outlaw promotion of the Global Wrestling Federation) in Florida, World Class Championship Wrestling in Texas, Union of Wrestling Forces International in Japan, Future of Wrestling, Four Star Championship Wrestling, Nick Mayberry's Hardkore Championship Wrestling, Florida Championship Wrestling, as well as numerous tours of Mexico, Puerto Rico (World Wrestling Council), and Japan.

Alex G is regarded as one of the best wrestling trainers in Florida. As a trainer, he worked in several schools alongside other wrestlers such as Duke "The Dumpster" Droese, "Screamin'" Norman Smiley, Bruno Sassi, and Rusty Brooks. He is currently a trainer at Coastal Championship Wrestling's "Bodyslam University" and has a side tattoo business.

He has been responsible for training several wrestlers who have been to or are currently in World Wrestling Entertainment's Deep South Wrestling territory, such as former DSW Champion Ryan O'Reilly, and SmackDown! wrestler Montel Vontavious Porter and former developmental wrestler [ OVW / DSW ] Ken Theissen. He also had a hand in the training of several popular mainstays on the Florida independent scene including Chris Jones, Dave Perry, Logan Fernandez, Norge Alvarez, Big Japan Pro Wrestling star Craig Classic, Slapnuts Fred, The Lifeguards (Daron Smythe and Wade Kovely), Brian Burly, and the tag team of "The Modern Day Theory" Scott Commodity and Preston James.

== Coastal Championship Wrestling and other indies ==
He is still semi-active as a wrestler in South Florida.

On August 12, 2006 at "Summer Heat," the Cash Money Brothers faced off against CCW tag team champions The Syrian Slasher and American Taliban, managed by Snakemaster Abudadein. The match ended when Abudadein had thrown a pair of brass knuckles into the ring with the intention of his wrestlers to use them, but Alex G. picked them up, knocked Slasher out when the referee was distracted, concealed the knux under his arm, then pinned him for the three. However, when celebrating the victory, the knux fell to the mat, leading the referee to discover them and reverse the decision. Despite the Soul Man's insistence that Abudadein had thrown it in the ring, the referee's decision stood, keeping the belts around the waists of the champions.

On October 27, 2006 at Division 1 Pro Wrestling's first show in Davie, Florida, "Open For Business", "Cash Money" Alex G teamed with partner, "Big Money" Ram, to take on the Black Market for the then vacant D1PW Tag Team Championships. The Black Market went on to defeat the Cash Money Brothers, and slept with two ring rats after the match. The Cash Money Brothers have faced more defeat in Division 1 Pro Wrestling having lost to the Lifeguards at the Hialeah Fleamarket on November 25, 2006 and The Heartbreak Express on January 6 due to interference from Amy Vitale.

== Championships and accomplishments ==
- Coastal Championship Wrestling

- CCW Tag Team Championship (1 time) - with "Big Money" Ram

- Florida Wrestling Federation

- FWF Light Heavyweight Championship (1 time)

- Four Star Championship Wrestling

- FSCW Light Heavyweight Championship (1 time)

- Global Wrestling Alliance

- GWA Tag Team Championship (1 time) - with "Ram Man" Johnny Evans
- GWA Television Championship (1 time)

- Independent Championship Wrestling Association (Florida)

- ICWA United States Tag Team Championship (1 time)

- Pan-American Championship Wrestling

- PACW Junior Heavyweight Championship (1 time)

- Pro Wrestling Illustrated

- PWI ranked him # 486 of the 500 best singles wrestlers of the PWI Years in 1993.

- World Wrestling Council

- WWC World Junior Heavyweight Championship (1 time)

- World Wide Wrestling

- WWW Tag Team Championship (1 time)
