= Mike Sullivan (wrestler) =

American professional wrestler (born 1971)

Personal information
- Born: 1971 (age 54–55) Long Island, New York

Professional wrestling career
- Ring name(s): Mike Sullivan; Freedom Ryder
- Billed height: 5 ft 10 in (1.78 m)
- Billed weight: 220 lb (100 kg)
- Trained by: Brett Sawyer; Dory Funk, Jr. Steve Keirn; Jimmy Del Ray; Tommy Rogers; Pat Tanaka; Luke Williams; Butch Miller
- Debut: 1998

Mike Sullivan (born 1971) is an American professional wrestler who competes in Southeastern independent promotions including Full Impact Pro, Future of Wrestling, International Professional Wrestling and NWA Florida. He also had several brief appearances in the X Wrestling Federation, World Championship Wrestling and the World Wrestling Federation.

One half of Naturally Marvelous with Scoot Andrews, he and Andrews were part of the stable Tampa Clique with Buck Quartermain and Pepi Prado and later Kevin Kelly's Alliance of Defiance with Billy Fives and Rod Steel during the early 2000s.

== Career ==
=== Early life and career ===
Growing up in Long Island, New York, Sullivan was a fan of professional wrestling as a child watching the World Wrestling Federation's Saturday morning television show Superstars of Wrestling on local WOR-TV. He later attended live events at the Nassau Coliseum and Madison Square Garden as well as a rare American Wrestling Association card at Ward Melville High School, where wrestler Mick Foley graduated from. Sullivan also attended Foley's first show in June 1986.

Sullivan was initially trained by Brett Sawyer, the brother of Mad Dog Sawyer, at his wrestling school in Pinellas Park. After three months, he began training on his own and was later trained under Dory Funk, Jr., Steve Keirn, Jimmy Del Ray, Tommy Rogers, Pat Tanaka and The Bushwhackers (Luke Williams and Butch Miller). Sullivan eventually made his debut with his brother as the Freedom Ryders facing his future tag team partner Emory Hale and another wrestler in Bradenton, Florida. The match lasted up to 20 minutes.

He continued using the Freedom Ryder gimmick during his early career and eventually made his debut in IPW Hardcore for promoter Ron Niemi. On May 12, he defeated Pat Tanaka in the tournament finals to crown the first IPW Heavyweight Champion. His reign lasted a little more than a month before losing the title to "Iceman" Buck Quartermain in Pinellas Park on June 26.

=== World Championship Wrestling and the World Wrestling Federation ===
That same year, he was brought into World Championship Wrestling by manager Jimmy Hart. During his brief stint, he wrestled against Glacier and teamed with Nick Dinsmore against Scott and Steve Armstrong. During a match with Scott Hall, he was attacked by members of the New World Order. Returning to the independent circuit the following year, he participated in the 2001 ECWA Super 8 Tournament losing to Reckless Youth in the opening rounds. His performance in the tournament later resulted in East Coast Wrestling Alliance promoter Jim Ketner and announcer Kevin Kelly to arrange a tryout match for the World Wrestling Federation later facing Low Ki at Madison Square Garden. He would appear on WWF Jakked three times between 2000 and 2001 facing Raven, Hardcore Holly and Test. He also took part in television tapings for Jimmy Hart's X Wrestling Federation in matches against The Wall and Lenny Lane.

=== Return to Florida ===
Competing under his real name, he eventually returned to IPW Hardcore where he regained the IPW Heavyweight Championship winning the title a record four times. He also made several unsuccessful attempts to win the NWA Florida Heavyweight Championship. When the title was vacant in November 2000, he lost to Buck Quartermain in a four-way match with Pepe Prado and Scoot Andrews on January 23, 2001. Three months later, he and Buck Quartermain lost their titles to Scoot Andrews who became a triple crown winner with the IPW, FOW and NWA Florida Heavyweight Championships. At the NWA 53rd Anniversary show in St. Petersburg on October 13, he and Andrews took part in the main event, an interpromotional match between IPW Hardcore and NWA Florida, which had (Scoot Andrews, Mike Sullivan, Jet Jaguar, Chaos and The Shane Twins) in a "Wargames"-style match against Team NWA Florida (Buck Q, Rod Steel, Lex Lovett and The New Heavenly Bodies). The match ended in a no-contest. He also lost to Christopher Daniels in a four-way elimination match with Scoot Andrews and Danny Doring at the Florida WrestlePlex on June 28, 2002.

He and Scoot Andrews soon joined forces in their feud with IPW Tag Team Champions The Strong Brothers (Roderick and Sedrick Strong). During an interpromotional event between IPW Hardcore and NWA Florida held at the Fort Homer W. Hesterly Armory on April 24, 2001, he and Andrews defeated NWA Florida's Pepe Prado and Billy Fives. After the match, they turned "heel" upset at the fans who were cheering for the Strong Brothers while they were "babyfaces".

Forming Naturally Marvelous, they joined Buck Quartermain and Pepi Prado in the Tampa Clique which would dominate the promotion during the next year. The two eventually defeated the Strong Brothers for the titles in a steel cage match at the supercard Extreme Intentions on September 20, 2002. The following month at No More Games, he and Andrews defeated The Shane Twins (Mike and Todd Shane) to unify the IPW and NWA Florida Tag Team Championship on October 11, 2002. He and Andrews were scheduled to meet the Shane Twins at Valentine's Massacre on February 8, 2003. Sullivan was unable to compete due to a family emergency, however, and he was replaced by referee turned wrestler Mikey Tenderfoot and lost the unified titles to the Shane Twins.

He and Andrews became founding members of the Alliance of Defiance with Billy Fives, Rod Steel and later Sullivan's valet Jenni Lee. Defeated Rod Steel to become the number one contender for the NWA Southern Heavyweight Championship, he also won a five-way match between Sedrick Strong, David Babylon, Lex Lovett and Danny Doring on February 28, 2004. After pursuing him for over three months, Sullivan finally defeated Steve Corino for the title on March 20. He was forced to vacate the title five months later due to injury.

At a NWA Florida card, Sullivan faced Scoot Andrews and Billy Fives in a three-way match on February 26, 2005 and which went to a 30 min. time limit draw. This was Andrews final match as he had officially announced his retirement earlier that night. Later that year, he defeated Lex Lovett, Buck Quartermain and Bruce Steel in a four-way match at an IPW Hardcore show on September 17.

On December 17, he made his debut for Elite Wrestling Entertainment and fought to a no-contest with Buck Quartermain. During early 2006, Sullivan faced Donovan Morgan and Steve Madison and, on April 28, he defeated D'Lo Brown in a grudge match and who was accompanied by Scoot Andrews in Brown's corner.

== Championships and accomplishments ==
- Independent Pro Wrestling

- IPW Heavyweight Championship (4 times)
- IPW Tag Team Championship (2 times) - with Buck Quartermain and Scoot Andrews

- Future of Wrestling

- FOW Heavyweight Championship (1 time)

- NWA Florida

- NWA Florida Tag Team Championship (1 time) - with Scoot Andrews
- NWA Southern Heavyweight Championship (Florida version) (1 time)

- Pro Wrestling Illustrated

- PWI ranked him # 253 of the 500 best singles wrestlers of the PWI 500 in 2006
