= FOW Heavyweight Championship =

Professional wrestling championship

FOW world Heavyweight Championship

Details
- Promotion: Future of Wrestling
- Date established: May 1, 1998
- Date retired: December 2013
Statistics
- First champion: Johnny Evans
- Final champion: Sean Allen
- Most reigns: Billy Fives (6 reigns)
- Longest reign: Sean Allen (435-465 days)
- Shortest reign: T.J. Jackson (<1 day)

The FOW World Heavyweight Championship was a professional wrestling title in American independent promotion Future of Wrestling. The title was created when "Ram Man" Johnny Evans won the title in Miami, Florida on May 1, 1998. It was defended throughout southern Florida, most often in Davie, Oakland Park, Pembroke Pines and occasionally in Ft. Lauderdale and Tampa, Florida. The title was also defended outside the United States during international tours to Peru and Saudi Arabia in 1999 and 2002 respectively. There have been a total of 21 recognized individual champions, who have had a combined 30 official reigns.

== Title history ==
No.	Wrestlers	Reigns	Date	Days held	Place	Notes
1	Johnny Evans	1	May 1, 1998	92	Miami, Florida	
2	T.J. Jackson	1	August 1, 1998	<1	Oakland Park, Florida	
Title vacant.
3	Rusty Brooks	1	October 10, 1998	63	Oakland Park, Florida	Won title in a battle royal.
4	J.R. James	1	December 12, 1998	38	Oakland Park, Florida	
5	Gator B. Long	1	January 19, 1999	11	Tampa, Florida	
6	Pat McGuire	1	January 30, 1999	91	Oakland Park, Florida	Pat McGuire also holds the FOW Hardcore Championship during this time.
7	Bobby Rogers	1	May 1, 1999	19	Cooper City, Florida	
8	Prince Ali Khan	1	May 20, 1999	2	Lima, Peru	
9	Bobby Rogers	2	May 22, 1999	35	Lima, Peru	
10	Dennis Allen	1	June 26, 1999	91	Pembroke Pines, Florida	Won title in a 10-man "Table Death Match".
11	Pat McGuire	2	September 25, 1999	–	Pembroke Pines, Florida	
Title vacant.
12	Chris Charger	1	March 26, 2000	27	Ft. Lauderdale, Florida	Defeated Billy Fives in a tournament final at Chairshots and Champions.
13	Pat McGuire	3	April 22, 2000	273	Ft. Lauderdale, Florida	
14	Billy Fives	1	January 20, 2001	75	Ft. Lauderdale, Florida	
15	Scoot Andrews	1	April 5, 2001	37	Tampa, Florida	
16	Billy Fives	2	May 12, 2001	35	Davie, Florida	
17	Low Ki	1	June 16, 2001	1	Davie, Florida	
18	Billy Fives	3	June 17, 2001	300	Hollywood, Florida	
19	Norman Smiley	1	April 13, 2002	77	Davie, Florida	
20	Billy Fives	4	June 29, 2002	26	Davie, Florida	
21	Mike Sullivan	1	July 25, 2002	1	Saudi Arabia	
22	Billy Fives	5	July 26, 2002	36	Saudi Arabia	
23	Bruno Sassi	1	August 31, 2002	105	Plantation, Florida	Sassi also holds the FOW International Heavyweight Championship.
24	Curt Hennig	1	December 14, 2002	58	Pembroke Pines, Florida	Curt Hennig died as champion prior to the FOW closing.
Title vacant.
25	The Sheik	1	October 10, 2009	–	Davie, Florida	Sheik defeated Big Daddy Gonzo, Casey Thompson, Craig Classic, Dirty White Boy, J-Dawg, Jason Trade, Joey Saint, Jordan Rayner and The Beast in a Ten Man Elimination Tables Match for the vacant Championship
Title vacant.
26	Billy Fives	6	January 29, 2011	189	Davie, Florida	Billy Fives defeated ERA III in a tournament final in the FOW Relaunch event.
27	Tommy Vandal	1	August 6, 2011	350	Hollywood, Florida	
28	Aron Agony	1	July 21, 2012	21	Miami, Florida	
29	Tommy Vandal	2	August 11, 2012	42	Deerfield Beach, Florida	
30	Sean Allen	1	September 22, 2012	435 - 465	Deerfield Beach, Florida	Ended December 2013

== Combined reigns ==
Rank	Wrestler	No. of reigns	Combined days
1	Billy Fives	6	661
2	Sean Allen	1	435–465
3	Tommy Vandal	2	392
4	Pat McGuire	3	364 -
5	Bruno Sassi	1	105
6	Johnny Evans	1	92
7	Dennis Allen	1	91
8	Norman Smiley	1	77
9	Rusty Brooks	1	63
10	Curt Hennig	1	58
11	Bobby Rogers	2	54
12	J.R. James	1	38
13	Scoot Andrews	1	37
14	Chris Charger	1	27
15	Aron Agony	1	21
16	Gator B. Long	1	11
17	Prince Ali Khan	1	2
18	Low Ki	1	1
18	Mike Sullivan	1	1
20	T.J. Jackson	1	<1
21	The Sheik	1	–
