= FOW Hardcore Championship =

Professional wrestling championship

Details
- Promotion: Future of Wrestling
- Date established: October 8, 1998
- Date retired: July 6, 2002
Statistics
- First champion(s): Pat McGuire
- Final champion(s): Chris Charger
- Most reigns: Bobby Rogers, Pat McGuire and Barry Horowitz (2 reigns)
- Longest reign: Bobby Rogers (98 days)
- Shortest reign: Rusty Brooks, Bobby Rogers, Pat McGuire and Barry Horowitz (<1 day)

The FOW Hardcore Championship was a professional wrestling title in American independent promotion Future of Wrestling. The title was created when "Mr. Extreme" Pat McGuire won the title in Oakland Park, Florida on October 8, 1998. It was defended throughout southern Florida, most often in Oakland Park, Davie and Plantation, Florida. There have been a total of 9 recognized individual champions, who have had a combined 10 official reigns.

== Title History ==
No.	Wrestlers	Reigns	Date	Days held	Place	Notes
1	Pat McGuire	1	October 8, 1998	65	Oakland Park, Florida	
2	Bobby Rogers	1	December 12, 1998	98	Oakland Park, Florida	
3	Pat McGuire	2	March 20, 1999	<1	Oakland Park, Florida	Title unified with the FOW Heavyweight Championship.
Title inactive on March 20, 1999.
4	Bobby Rogers	2	December 1, 2001	<1	Davie, Florida	The title is revived in a "Xtreme Xmas Tree" mixed tag team match between Buddy Rogers and Jodi X vs. Silhouette and Nick Mayberry at "Hardcore Holiday 4". Bobby Rogers pins Nick Mayberry for the title.
5	Maximum Capacity	1	December 1, 2001	70	Davie, Florida	Defeated Bobby Rogers for the title moments after the "Xtreme Xmas Tree" match.
6	Barry Horowitz	1	February 9, 2002	63	Davie, Florida	
7	Rusty Brooks	1	April 13, 2002	<1	Davie, Florida	
8	Barry Horowitz	2	April 13, 2002	<1	Davie, Florida	
9	The Sandman	1	April 13, 2002	56	Davie, Florida	
10	Chris Charger	1	June 8, 2002	28	Plantation, Florida	
Title retired after Chris Charger won the FOW Light Heavyweight Championship from Al Bino in Plantation, Florida on July 6, 2002.'

== Combined reigns ==
Rank	Wrestler	No. of reigns	Combined days
1	Bobby Rogers	2	98
2	Pat McGuire	2	65
3	Maximum Capacity	1	70
4	Barry Horowitz	2	63
5	The Sandman	1	56
6	Chris Charger	1	28
7	Rusty Brooks	1	<1
