= Rusty Brooks =

American professional wrestler (1958–2021)

Personal information
- Born: Kurt Koski; February 7, 1958 Denton, Texas, U.S.
- Died: February 11, 2021 (aged 63)

Professional wrestling career
- Ring name(s): Masked Assassin; Rusty Brooks; Super Duper Mario
- Billed height: 6 ft 0 in (1.83 m)
- Billed weight: 345 lb (156 kg)
- Trained by: Jim Isler; Boris Malenko
- Debut: October 31, 1982
- Retired: 2013

Kurt Koski (February 7, 1958 – February 11, 2021) was an American professional wrestler, known by his ring name Rusty Brooks. He competed in several North American independent promotions, including International World Class Championship Wrestling (IWCCW), Florida Championship Wrestling (FCW) and the National Wrestling Alliance (NWA). He also appeared in the World Wrestling Federation (WWF) during the mid-1980s as a preliminary wrestler.

== Professional wrestling career ==
Koski was trained by "Gentleman" Jim Isler and Boris Malenko. Brooks made his wrestling debut in Buddy Gilbert's World Wrestling Association against Steve Brody on October 31, 1982.

Within two years, he signed with the World Wrestling Federation (WWF) and was used extensively on WWF Championship Wrestling against Tony Parisi, André the Giant, Junkyard Dog and Ricky Steamboat. In 1985 Brooks had a nationally televised match with WWF World Champion Hulk Hogan. On television he also faced then World Tag Team Champions Barry Windham and Mike Rotunda and The British Bulldogs. In the WWF, Brooks primarily played a heel jobber (a wrestler who was used to make the top stars look good). Brooks often teamed with fellow preliminary wrestlers Steve Lombardi, Barry O, and Mr. X in tag team competition, and Brooks also scored upset wins over his former partners.

After leaving the WWF in late 1985, he competed on the independent circuit in Florida, including a stint in International Championship Wrestling (ICW) as Super Duper Mario. He spent the next decade in various independent promotions, where he won several tag team titles with Dr. Red Roberts, Matt Otto, Jumbo Baretta, "Pretty Boy" Aldo Lane (Ricky Santana), Soulman Alex G and Gangrel. In 1986, he worked for Championship Wrestling from Florida in 1986. From 1986 to 1987, he competed in Florida for Global Championship Wrestling, capturing the Global tag team title with Jumbo Baretta from Dean and Joe Malenko. Brooks and Baretta were managed by wrestling veteran Ox Baker and later Boris Malenko. They feuded with The Soul Patrol and Malenko brothers.

In December 1988, Brooks returned to the WWF, teaming with Iron Mike Sharpe losing to Demolition on WWF Superstars and also losing to Jake Roberts on WWF Wrestling Challenge.

In 1991, he competed in Herb Abrams's Universal Wrestling Federation where he had matches with B. Brian Blair and Bam Bam Bigelow.

He later wrestled for Future of Wrestling (FOW), where he won the heavyweight and hardcore titles around 2000. He was named "Wrestler of the Year" by FOW. In 2001, he began teaming with Bobby Brooks as The Brooks and later The Masked Assassins in FOW and the Independent Professional Wrestling Association. In 2002, he went to Peru with FOW as they were doing a tour there. During his time in southern Florida, he also faced Hack Meyers, Barry Horowitz, and Greg "The Hammer" Valentine before his retirement in 2002.

On July 31, 2004, Brooks refereed a match during the HCW Incredible 8 Tournament in Davie, Florida. He called a bout between his son, Jeff "J-Dawg" Brooks and Jimmy Rave. On February 4, 2006, he was honored by Nick Mayberry with an HCW Award, along with three other Florida wrestlers.

He returned to wrestling in 2009 and competed in the independent circuit in Florida. He wrestled his last match in 2013.

== Promoting and training ==
Koski trained students in his Rusty Brooks Pro-Wrestling Academy, which operated in his backyard in the late 1980s and in a warehouse in the 1990s. He later operated the School of Hard Knocks wrestling school with Boris Malenko in Florida. Students trained in the school include Konnor, Luna Vachon, MVP, Gangrel, Angel Rose, and Norman Smiley.

In addition, he was also a trainer from 2017-2019 at G.W.A. (Gangrel's Wrestling Asylum) in Dania Beach, FL. The wrestling school was run by former WWE wrestler Gangrel.

He also worked as the Commissioner of L.I.V.E. Pro Wrestling. He was also the former Director of Authority for Independent Championship Wrestling and has also managed a few of his students in the now defunct Division 1 Pro Wrestling (D1PW).

== Personal life ==
Koski was born in Denton, Texas, but later moved to Florida. He attended Miramar High School, and he was a football player for North Texas State. He is the father of Jeff "J-Dawg" Brooks, who wrestles on the independent circuit in Florida.

== Death ==
Brooks died on February 11, 2021, aged 63, four days after his birthday. He underwent amputation on several toes in January, a few weeks prior to his death.

== Championships and accomplishments ==
- Championship Wrestling Entertainment
  - Hall of Honors (2014)
- Florida Wrestling Alliance
  - FWA Heavyweight Championship (2 times)
- Future of Wrestling
  - FOW Heavyweight Championship (1 time)
  - FOW Tag Team Championship - with Bobby Brooks (1 time)
  - FOW Hardcore Championship (1 time)
- Global Championship Wrestling
  - GCW Tag Team Championship (2 times) - with Jumbo Baretta
- Independent Pro Wrestling Association
  - IPWA Southern Heavyweight Championship (1 time)
  - IPWA Brass Knuckles Championship (1 time)
  - IPWA Tag Team Championship (5 times) - with David Heath (2), Bobby Brooks (2), and Soulman Alex G
- Other titles
  - WWA Atlantic Coast Heavyweight Championship (1 time)
  - DSWA Southeastern Heavyweight Championship (1 time)
- Pro Wrestling Illustrated
  - PWI ranked him # 391 of the 500 best singles wrestlers of the PWI 500 in 1993

== See also ==
- List of professional wrestling promoters
