= Low Ki =

American professional wrestler

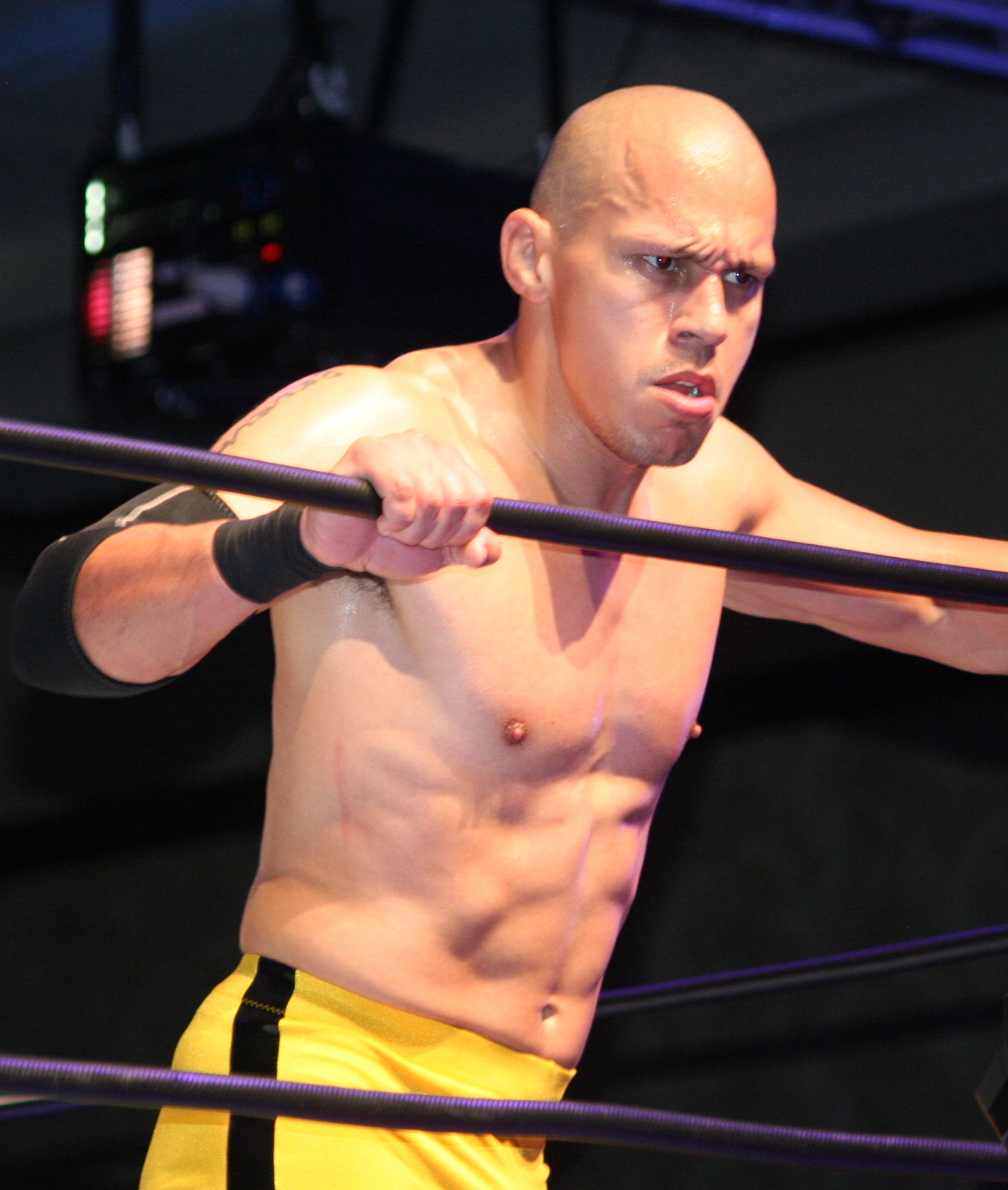
- Low Ki in 2017

Personal information
- Born: Brandon Silvestry; September 6, 1979 (age 47) Brooklyn, New York, U.S.
- Website: low-ki.com

Professional wrestling career
- Ring name(s): Kaval; Kawal; Loki; Lo-Ki; Low Ki; Quick Kick; Senshi
- Billed height: 5 ft 7 in (1.70 m)
- Billed weight: 174 lb (79 kg)
- Billed from: Brooklyn, New York
- Trained by: Homicide; Jim Kettner
- Debut: September 25, 1998

Brandon Silvestry (born September 6, 1979) is an American professional wrestler, better known by his ring name Low Ki. He is best known for his time in TNA Wrestling, Ring of Honor (ROH) and Major League Wrestling (MLW) as Low Ki and Senshi and with WWE as Kaval.

He is a one-time PWG World Champion, the inaugural ROH World Champion, one-time MLW World Heavyweight Champion and a three-time NWA World Tag Team Champion, and has won a number of tournaments and other championships on the independent circuit, and was the winner of the second season of NXT in 2010. Silvestry has also worked extensively in Japan, most notably for New Japan Pro-Wrestling (NJPW), where he was a three-time IWGP Junior Heavyweight Champion, and Pro Wrestling Zero-One (Zero-One), where he was a one-time Zero-One International Junior Heavyweight and NWA International Lightweight Tag Team Champion. He is a three time world champion, and is the only wrestler in history to have been ROH, PWG, and MLW World Champion.

== Professional wrestling career ==
=== Early career (1998–2002) ===
Silvestry began wrestling in late 1998 under the ring name Low Ki, which he derived from the lyrics of the song "No Diggity". He began wrestling for Jersey All Pro Wrestling (JAPW) in 1998, challenging Homicide and Kane D for the JAPW Tag Team Championship. The following year he challenged for the JAPW Light Heavyweight Championship twice, unsuccessfully, but defeated Crazy Ivan and Judas Young to win the second Best of the Light Heavyweights tournament.

In 2000, he began making several appearances in the World Wrestling Federation on their programs Metal and Jakked, where he competed against the likes of Raven, Crash Holly, Christian and Essa Ríos. The following year he made it through to the finals of All Pro Wrestling's King of the Indies tournament, losing the crown to American Dragon. It was also during 2001 that he defeated Nick Berk and Homicide in separate matches on the same evening to win both the JAPW Heavyweight and Light Heavyweight Titles; he would successfully defend both titles in separate matches at their Fourth Anniversary Show later that month in July. He lost both titles in a Three Way match the following month to Homicide, with Xavier as the other competitor.

=== Ring of Honor (2002–2006) ===
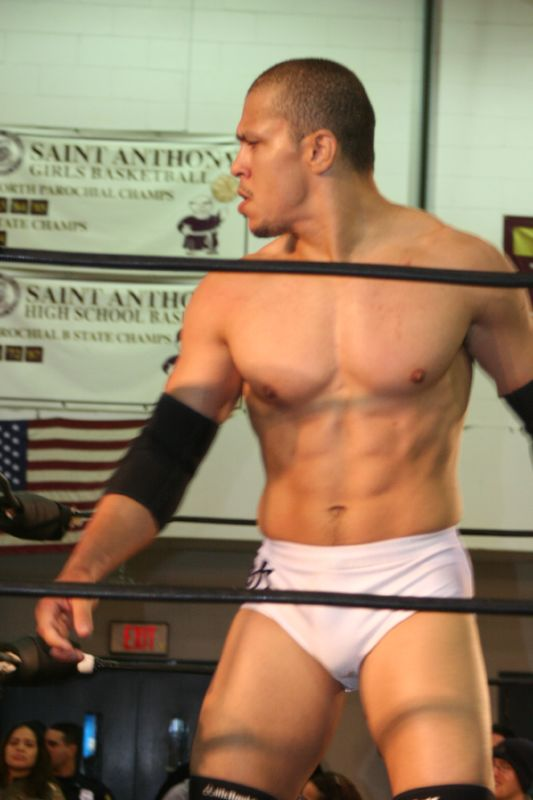
Low Ki in the ring in 2008.

Low Ki made his Ring of Honor (ROH) debut at its first show, The Era of Honor Begins, on February 23. In the show's main event, he defeated Bryan Danielson and "The Fallen Angel" Christopher Daniels. On July 27, 2002, at Crowning a Champion, he became the first ever ROH Champion by defeating Daniels, Spanky and Doug Williams in a Four Way Ironman match. On August 24, Low Ki successfully defended his title against A.J. Styles. On September 21, at Unscripted, he lost the title to Xavier, who, after winning the title, became a member of Daniels's faction The Prophecy. Low Ki then faced Samoa Joe on October 5 in what was Joe's official ROH debut in a "Fight Without Honor". In what resembled more of an MMA fight, Low Ki won the match and they shook hands after the match. Low Ki left the promotion in 2004 due to the Feinstein incident, but he returned on July 17, 2004, during a match, where Samoa Joe and the Briscoe Brothers fought against The Rottweilers (Homicide and the Havana Pitbulls). It looked like Low Ki would save Samoa Joe from a beatdown by The Rottweilers, but instead he spat on the ROH Championship, which was then held by Joe, and joined The Rottweilers.

At Weekend of Thunder Night 2 on November 6, 2004, he started a feud with Bryan Danielson, who was Low Ki's partner in a match against Samoa Joe and Jushin Thunder Liger. Low Ki and Danielson lost the match and Low Ki blamed his partner for that, so The Rottweilers started a beatdown on Danielson. On December 4, at All Star Extravaganza II, Danielson defeated Homicide of The Rottweilers. In that same event, Low Ki wrestled Austin Aries in a number one contender's match to determine who would face ROH Champion Samoa Joe for the title. The match ended in a draw. Officials extended the match, but Low Ki refused to wrestle, so Aries was declared the winner. Instead of facing Joe at Final Battle 2004, Low Ki wrestled Danielson, but got himself disqualified and then attacked the referee. This was enough for ROH officials to suspend him indefinitely as a result.

Low Ki returned on May 7, 2005, and immediately attacked Jay Lethal and Samoa Joe at Manhattan Mayhem with his fellow Rottweilers, Homicide, Julius Smokes, Monsta Mack and Rocky Romero. The impromptu tag team match was made: The Rottweilers vs. Samoa Joe and Jay Lethal. Low Ki and Homicide won the match and injured Lethal with a Ghetto Stomp/Cop Killa combination. The feud continued on June 18 at Death Before Dishonor III, where he and Lethal faced each other in a singles match, but it ended in a no contest. They had a rematch on August 12 at Redemption, but the ending was the same and Rottweilers beat Lethal down after the match. Finally, on September 17 at Glory By Honor IV, a "Fight Without Honor" between the two ended with Low Ki getting a pinfall victory over Lethal. After Samoa Joe went on to save Colt Cabana from a beatdown by The Rottweilers, Lethal came out to even the odds and said that he wanted yet another rematch with Low Ki, which Lethal won this time, ending the feud. Later in the year, Low Ki helped Homicide in his feud against Colt Cabana. On December 17, 2005, at Final Battle 2005, he challenged Kenta for his GHC Junior Heavyweight Championship, but came up short. Low Ki left ROH once again in January 2006 due to a "disagreement in business arrangements". He won his last match on January 28 against Jack Evans. ROH covered his leaving by having the ROH commissioner Jim Cornette ban Low Ki from Ring of Honor for life after it was discovered that he was the one who knocked Cornette's tooth out at that show. He was also used as a focus point (in name only) in the Cornette/Homicide feud in the summer of 2006, with Cornette refusing to reinstate Low Ki as Homicide's "third wish."

=== NWA Total Nonstop Action (2002–2004) ===
Low Ki's first stint with NWA Total Nonstop Action (NWA TNA) was for its debut show on June 19, 2002, in a six-man tag team match alongside A.J. Styles and Jerry Lynn against the Flying Elvises. On June 26, he attempted to become the first X Division Champion, but was beaten by Styles. He would, though, eventually go on to win the title from Styles on August 7, but lost it three weeks later to Lynn. He would later form the Triple X faction with Christopher Daniels and Elix Skipper that year and hold the NWA World Tag Team Championship three times under the "Freebird Rule". Low Ki wrestled beside Skipper when Triple X defeated America's Most Wanted (Chris Harris and James Storm) for the title on January 22, 2003. When Daniels's greed for the X Division Championship initially forced Low Ki out of Triple X, Low Ki would go on to battle Daniels in Ultimate X, but his pursuit was unsuccessful. He left NWA TNA in July 2004 and made his return to ROH.

=== Japan (2002–2009) ===
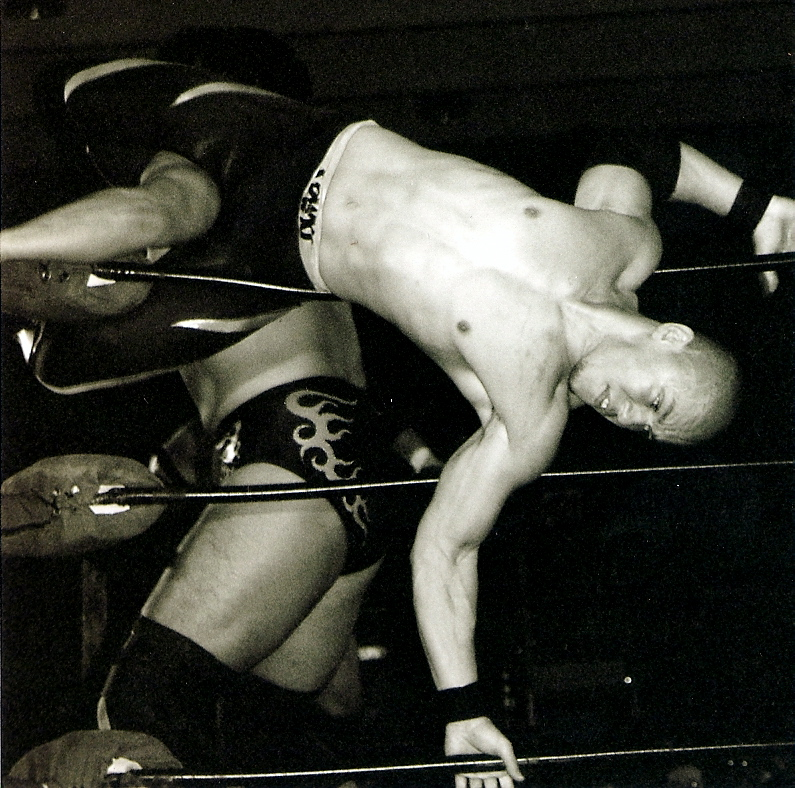
Low Ki wrestling Kenta Kobashi in November 2007.

Low Ki made his first trip to Japan with Pro Wrestling Zero-One in 2002. On September 16, he defeated Leonardo Spanky for the International Junior Heavyweight Championship from him. He held the championship until August 31, 2003, when he lost it to Wataru Sakata. During 2003, Low Ki also made several appearances for All Japan Pro Wrestling (AJPW).

Low Ki left Zero-One in mid-2004 to join Pro Wrestling Noah, where he was instantly given a title shot against Global Honored Crown (GHC) Junior Heavyweight Champion Yoshinobu Kanemaru, which he was unable to win. During this period, he represented Noah in MXW Pro Wrestling's Gaijin Battle Series.

Low Ki later joined New Japan Pro-Wrestling (NJPW) and joined Shinsuke Nakamura's stable RISE, replacing the injured Milano Collection A.T.; in his first match back, he suffered a knee injury, which required surgery. Low Ki returned to the promotion in September, defecting from RISE to join New Japan's main villainous faction, Great Bash Heel (GBH).

After joining GBH, he captured the International Wrestling Grand Prix (IWGP) Junior Heavyweight Championship from Tiger Mask on September 21, 2008, on NJPW's Circuit 2008 New Japan Generation tour. He subsequently lost it back to Tiger Mask on NJPW's Wrestle Kingdom III show in Tokyo on January 4, 2009. After losing the championship, Low Ki made several appearances for Hustle.

=== Return to TNA (2006–2008) ===
At Lockdown, Christopher Daniels's mystery opponent was revealed to be the returning Low Ki, who wrestled under the name of Senshi (Japanese for "warrior" or "soldier"). Following Lockdown, Senshi was not seen in action for several weeks. Instead, he was built up with a series of vignettes hyping his background, training, and desire to dominate the X Division once more, hinting at the possibility of challenging the X Division Champion, the undefeated Samoa Joe.

Senshi defeated Alex Shelley, Jay Lethal, Petey Williams, Shark Boy, and Sonjay Dutt at Slammiversary to become the number one contender to the X Division Championship. Senshi went on to become X Division Champion again on the June 22, 2006, episode of Impact!, defeating Joe and Dutt after he pinned Dutt. He remained undefeated for six months, successfully defending the X Division Championship against Kazarian at Victory Road, Jay Lethal and Petey Williams in a three-way match at Hard Justice, and Chris Sabin at No Surrender, before losing the title to Sabin in October at Bound for Glory.

Senshi later feuded with Austin Starr. Their feud would continue until Lockdown in a Six Sides of Steel match, which he won. At Slammiversary, he teamed with Rhino to defeat The Latin American Xchange (LAX). At Victory Road, Senshi competed in a 10-Man Ultimate X Match, which he lost. After the match, however, Triple X was reformed with Daniels, Senshi, and the returning Skipper. They won their reunion match on the July 19, 2007, episode of Impact! against Serotonin.

Triple X faced Lethal and Dutt and The Motor City Machine Guns at Hard Justice in a losing effort. Skipper and Senshi also went on to face LAX at Bound for Glory in Ultimate X, ultimately losing.

At Turning Point, Senshi competed in the Feast or Fired match in which he one of four briefcases. On the following episode of Impact, it was revealed that Senshi's case contained a pink slip which meant he was fired.

In December 2007, it was reported that Senshi had submitted his resignation to TNA and he left the promotion shortly after.

Despite his release from TNA, Silvestry remained in the TNA Impact! video game as Senshi, which was released in September 2008. Silvestry had provided the voice and motion capture for the game's fictional protagonist, Suicide.

=== Pro Wrestling Guerrilla (2007–2008, 2011) ===
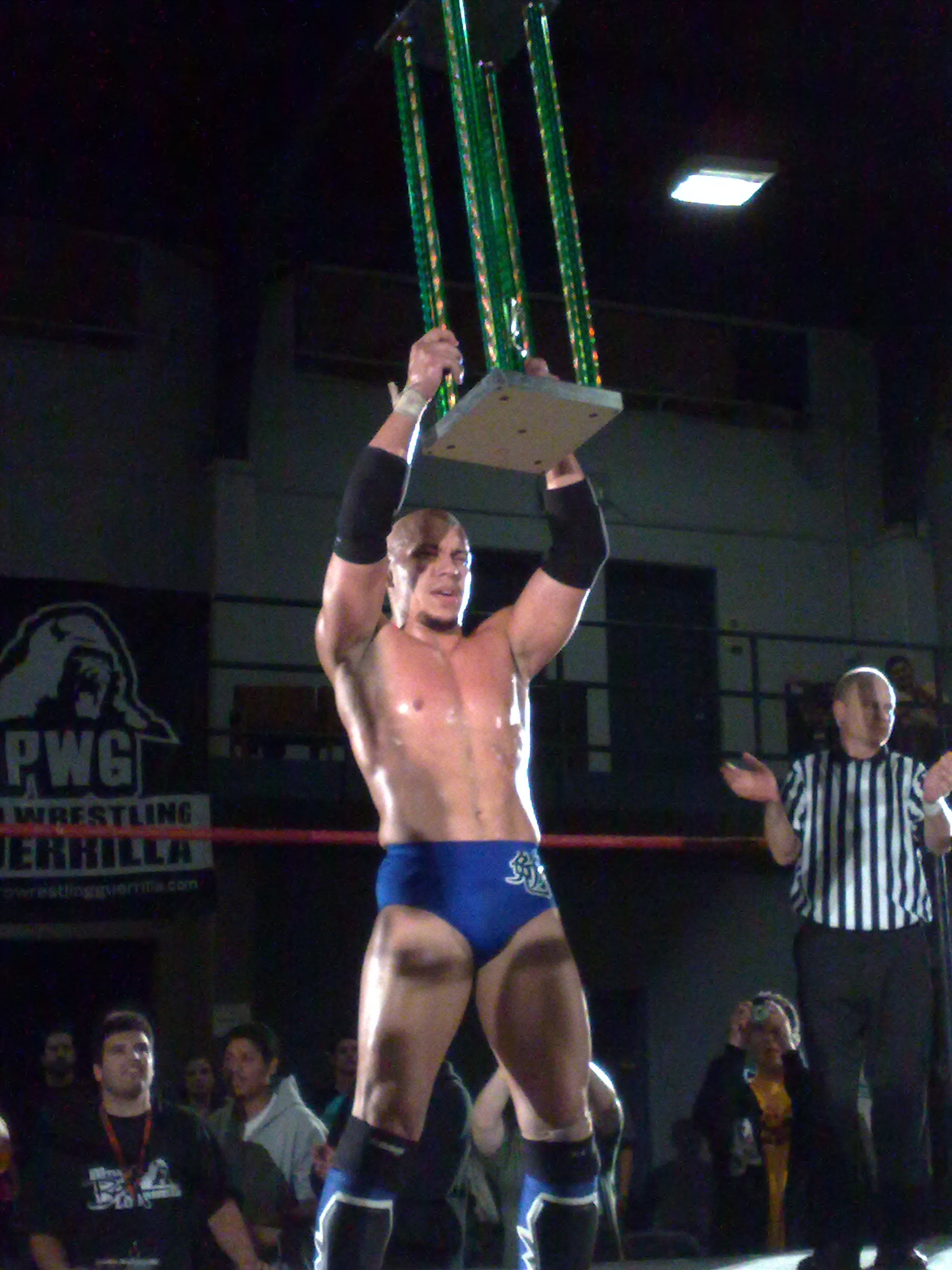
Low Ki with the 2008 Battle of Los Angeles trophy.

Low Ki made his debut for Pro Wrestling Guerrilla (PWG) on April 7, 2007, defeating Davey Richards at All Star Weekend V – Night One. On January 5, 2008, Low Ki won the PWG World Championship after defeating Bryan Danielson in an unannounced match. He had one successful title defense against El Generico, before a knee injury forced him to forfeit the championship just a month later.

Low Ki returned to PWG at All Star Weekend 7 – Night One on August 30, 2008, where he was a part of a four-way match for the World Championship; the bout also featured Eddie Kingston, Necro Butcher, and defending champion Chris Hero, who retained by pinning Kingston. On November 1 and 2 in Burbank, California, Low Ki defeated Roderick Strong in the opening round, Masato Yoshino in the quarterfinals, Nigel McGuinness in the semifinals, and Chris Hero in a non-title final match to win the 2008 Battle of Los Angeles tournament.

After his World Wrestling Entertainment tenure, Low Ki returned to PWG on January 29, 2011, during the WrestleReunion 5 weekend, in a rematch from 2007, where he defeated Davey Richards. In his next appearance on April 9, Low Ki defeated Akira Tozawa. On May 28, during the second night of All Star Weekend 8, Low Ki unsuccessfully challenged Claudio Castagnoli for the World Championship.

=== World Wrestling Entertainment (2008–2010) ===
Low Ki appeared on the November 7, 2008, edition of SmackDown in a dark match, losing to then-WWE Tag Team Champion Primo. Low Ki then won a match against Trent Beretta at the Florida Championship Wrestling (FCW) tapings on January 8. It was later announced on his official website that he had signed a contract with World Wrestling Entertainment (WWE). Initially, he wrestled under the name Kawal – "soldier" in the Tagalog language – in FCW, WWE's development territory, but later changed it to Kaval. In January 2009, he took a hiatus from FCW due to a leg injury, which would keep him sidelined until late October. On November 24, Kaval defeated Paul Burchill in a dark match prior to the SmackDown/ECW tapings. At the December 8 tapings, he lost to Goldust in another dark match. On the February 7 episode of FCW, he won against Bryan Danielson, for whom this was a debut match, after hitting him with Warrior's Way, and on February 8 won a fatal four-way match against Alberto Banderas, Wade Barrett and Michael Tarver to become the number one contender for the Florida Heavyweight Championship. Kaval received his title shot two weeks later, but was defeated by the defending champion, Justin Gabriel. On July 15, Kaval and Michael McGillicutty defeated Los Aviadores (Hunico and Epico) to win the Florida Tag Team Championship. Kaval and McGillicutty only held the championship for a single day before losing it back to Los Aviadores.

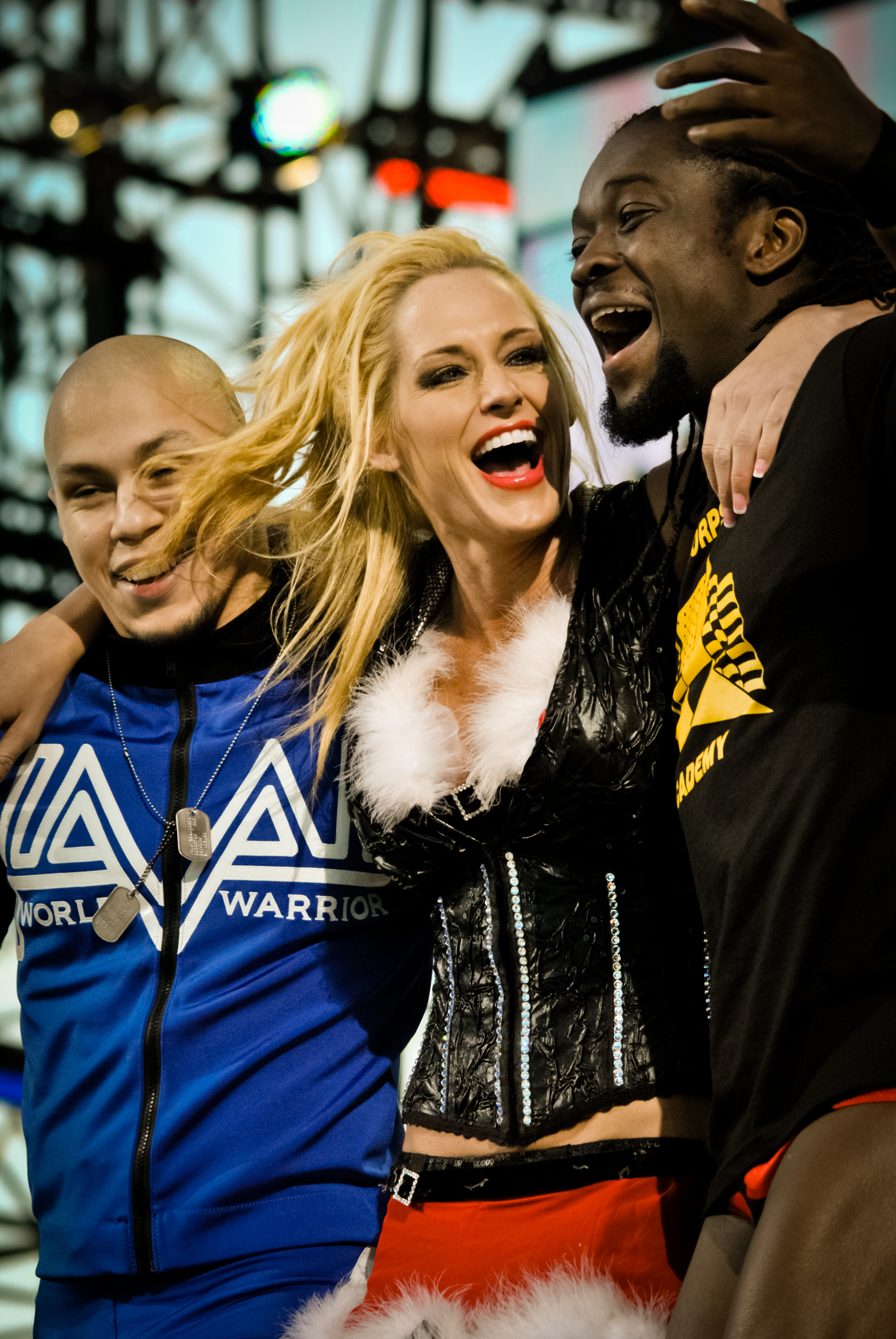
Kaval (left) with Michelle McCool, his NXT mentor (middle), and Kofi Kingston (right) at Tribute to the Troops in December 2010.

It was announced on June 1 that Kaval would be a participant in the second season of NXT, with Team Lay-Cool (Michelle McCool and Layla) as his storyline mentors. He debuted on the June 8 episode of NXT, but did not compete in a match. On the June 15 episode of NXT, he was defeated by Alex Riley in his debut, and the following week he was defeated by Eli Cottonwood. On the June 29 episode of NXT, Kaval teamed with Michael McGillicutty and Lucky Cannon against Riley, Cottonwood and Titus O'Neil, which his team won when he pinned Riley, giving Kaval his first win on NXT. Later that night, he was ranked first in the poll. Four weeks later on July 27, he fell to second place in the second poll, behind McGillicutty. On August 9, the rookies appeared in a six-man tag team match on Raw, which Kaval's team lost when he was pinned by Husky Harris. Following the match, he was attacked by Sheamus. The following night on NXT, Kaval's team won a rematch when Kaval pinned McGillicutty. In the poll later that night, Kaval regained the number one ranking. On the August 30 episode of Raw, Kaval and Daniel Bryan lost a triple threat tag team match to The Miz and Alex Riley. On August 31, Kaval won the second season of NXT, with McGillicutty ranked second and Riley in third place. Following the announcement of his victory, he was attacked by all the former season two rookies. In 2024, Silvestry revealed that he was not informed beforehand that he would be jumped on national television, believing the segment to be a shoot before finding out that John Laurinaitis told the other rookies not to inform him of the angle prior.

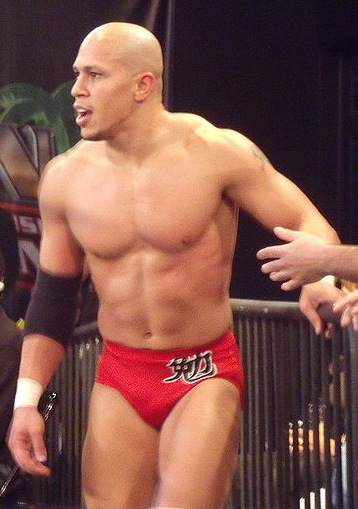
Kaval in 2010

Following his NXT victory, Kaval was moved to the SmackDown brand, making his debut during the September 7 tapings in a loss to Drew McIntyre, which aired on September 10. On the September 24 episode of SmackDown, Kaval lost to Chavo Guerrero Jr. On the October 8 episode of SmackDown, Kaval and Kofi Kingston lost to Drew McIntyre and Cody Rhodes when Rhodes pinned Kaval. On the October 15 episode of SmackDown Kaval lasted five minutes in the ring with Big Show and in doing so earned a spot on Team SmackDown at Bragging Rights. However, after the match, Kaval was challenged by Tyler Reks, who ultimately went on to defeat him for his spot at the pay-per-view. On the October 18 episode of Raw, Kaval competed in a SmackDown vs. Raw Battle Royal where he was eliminated by Mark Henry. On the October 29 episode of Smackdown, Kaval lost to Jack Swagger. Kaval then lost a rematch on the November 4 episode of WWE Superstars. On the November 11 episode of Superstars, Kaval lost to Drew McIntyre.

Kaval won his first match on the November 19 episode of SmackDown, by defeating the Intercontinental Champion Dolph Ziggler in a non-title match. Following his victory, Kaval announced that he would be using his guaranteed title opportunity that he earned by winning NXT at the Survivor Series pay-per-view against Ziggler for the Intercontinental Championship. At the pay-per-view, Kaval was unsuccessful in his attempt to win the Intercontinental Championship. On the December 3 episode of Smackdown, Kaval and MVP lost to Dolph Ziggler and Drew McIntyre. Both him and MVP were attacked by Kane. On the December 10 episode of Smackdown, Kaval lost to Jack Swagger by submission. On the December 17 episode of Smackdown, Kaval and Kofi Kingston defeated Jack Swagger and Dolph Ziggler.

Kaval's final appearance in WWE was a loss to Drew McIntyre on the live December 21 episode of SmackDown, and he was released from his contract on December 23.

=== Return to NJPW and second return to TNA (2011–2013) ===
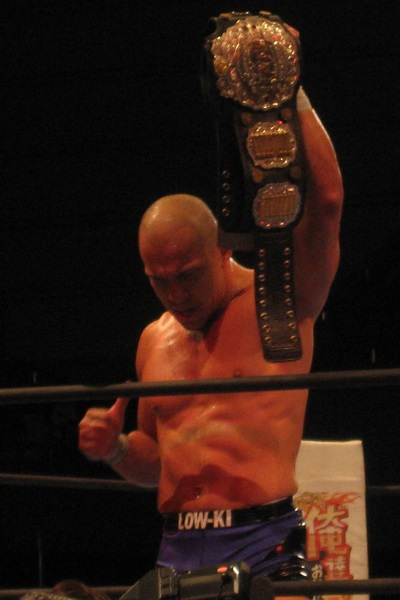
Low Ki holding the IWGP Junior Heavyweight Championship belt in June 2012.

On May 13, 2011, Silvestry, under the name Low Ki, made his return to NJPW, during the Invasion Tour 2011, the promotion's first tour of the United States, teaming with Homicide in a tag team match, where they defeated Jushin Thunder Liger and Tiger Mask. The following day, Low Ki unsuccessfully challenged Prince Devitt for the IWGP Junior Heavyweight Championship. On the third and final day of the tour in Philadelphia, Pennsylvania, Low Ki and Homicide unsuccessfully challenged Devitt and Ryusuke Taguchi for the IWGP Junior Heavyweight Tag Team Championship.

On June 27, 2011, Low Ki returned to TNA at the tapings of the June 30 edition of Impact Wrestling, defeating Jimmy Yang and Matt Bentley in a three-way match to advance to a four-way match for a TNA contract at Destination X. At the pay-per-view, Low Ki was defeated in the finals by Austin Aries.

In the year April 21, 2012, Low Ki returned to NJPW, aligning himself with the Chaos stable and teaming with Gedo, Jado and Rocky Romero in an eight-man tag team match, where they defeated Jushin Thunder Liger, Prince Devitt, Ryusuke Taguchi and Tiger Mask, with Ki pinning IWGP Junior Heavyweight Champion Devitt for the win. On May 3 at Wrestling Dontaku 2012, Low Ki defeated Devitt to win the IWGP Junior Heavyweight Championship for the second time. On May 27, Low Ki entered New Japan's 2012 Best of the Super Juniors tournament. When the round-robin stage of the tournament concluded on June 9, Low Ki finished with eight wins out of his eight matches, winning his block and advancing to the semifinals of the tournament. The following day, Low Ki defeated Prince Devitt in the semifinals, before losing to Ryusuke Taguchi in the finals of the tournament. On June 16 at Dominion 6.16, Low Ki defeated Taguchi in a rematch to retain the IWGP Junior Heavyweight Championship. On July 29, Low Ki lost the title to Kota Ibushi in his second defense. Low Ki regained the title from Ibushi on October 8 at King of Pro-Wrestling. On October 21, Low Ki and Brian Kendrick entered the 2012 Super Jr. Tag Tournament as "Chaos World Wrestling Warriors". However, the team was eliminated from the tournament in the first round by Apollo 55 (Prince Devitt and Ryusuke Taguchi). On November 11 at Power Struggle, Low Ki lost the IWGP Junior Heavyweight Championship to Prince Devitt in his first title defense.

On January 4, 2013, at Wrestle Kingdom 7 in Tokyo Dome, Low Ki unsuccessfully challenged Devitt for the title in a three-way match, which also included Kota Ibushi. Low Ki wrestled the entire match in a suit. The following month, New Japan removed Low Ki's profile from its official website, signaling the end of his run with the promotion. Low Ki had told New Japan office that he did not want to wrestle at an upcoming event in Fukushima because of health and safety reasons stemming from the Fukushima Daiichi nuclear disaster. Low Ki wrestled the WK7 match in the suit in protest. NJPW was reportedly "furious" over Low Ki wrestling a title match in a suit without clearing it with them first to the point that even years later, the company was said to be open to bringing anyone back "with the exception of Low Ki".

=== Return to the independent circuit (2012–present) ===
On January 14, 2012, Low Ki made his unadvertised debut for Evolve, defeating Ahtu at the final professional wrestling event in the Asylum Arena. Afterwards, it was announced that Low Ki had joined both Evolve and Dragon Gate USA full-time. Low Ki made his debut for Dragon Gate USA on January 27, when he defeated BxB Hulk in a singles match. Among speculations regarding his retirement from wrestling, Low Ki worked for Right Coast Pro's July 13, 2013, "Festivus" event, defeating Billy Bax in a singles match.

On March 30, 2014, Pro Wrestling Syndicate (PWS) announced that Low Ki was coming out of retirement to work an event for the promotion on June 7. The following day, he was also announced for Dragon Gate USA's April events. On April 4, Ki was defeated by Trent Baretta in his Dragon Gate USA return match.

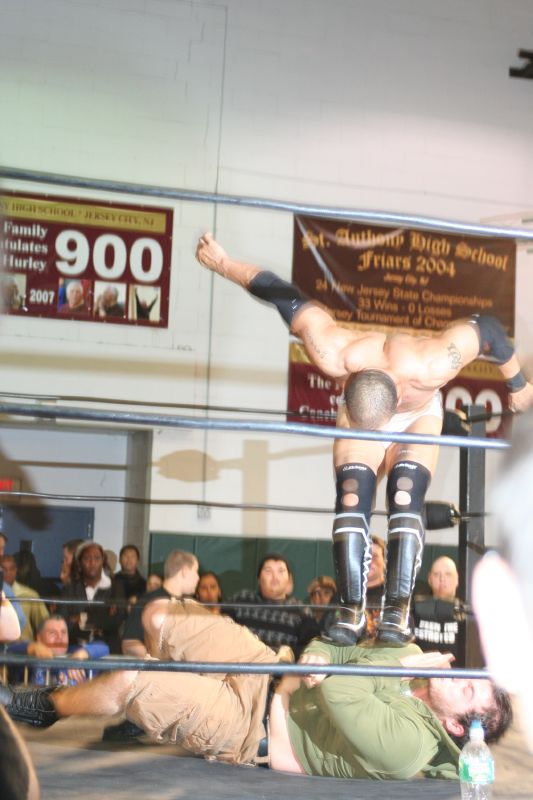
Low Ki performing the Ghetto Stomp in Jersey All Pro Wrestling.

=== All Japan Pro Wrestling (2013) ===
On August 11, 2013, AJPW announced that Low Ki would be returning to the promotion the following month to take part in the 2013 Ōdō Tournament. Low Ki entered the tournament on September 11, defeating Dark Cuervo in his first round match. Five days later, Low Ki was eliminated from the tournament in the second round by Akebono. Following the match, Low Ki was sidelined with an abdominal injury for the rest of the tour. On October 14, Silvestry announced his retirement from professional wrestling due to All Japan supposedly not honoring their contractual obligation of medical care following his injury.

=== Third return to TNA (2014–2015) ===
Low Ki returned to TNA in 2014, starting a rivalry against Samoa Joe over the X Division Championship. On the August 7 episode of Impact Wrestling, Low Ki was defeated by Samoa Joe in the finals of a tournament for the vacant title, which also included Sanada. Ki would face Joe again at Hardcore Justice in a losing effort. However, on September 19, Joe vacated the title due medical issues. On the November 12 episode of Impact Wrestling, Low Ki defeated Tigre Uno, Manik and DJ Z in a Four-Way match to win the vacant X Division Championship, becoming a three-time champion. Then, he started a storyline with Austin Aries. On January 7, 2015, episode of Impact Wrestling Ki lost the title against Aries, turned heel and joining the newly formed, villainous stable led by MVP known as The Beat Down Clan. On the following episode of Impact Wrestling, Low Ki defeated Austin Aries in a rematch to reclaim the X Division title, with help from interference of The Beat Down Clan. On the March 20 episode of Impact Wrestling, Low Ki lost the title to Rockstar Spud. In April, The Beat Down Clan started a feud with The Rising (Drew Galloway, Eli Drake and Micah) culminating in a match between both stables on the July 1 episode of Impact Wrestling, The Beat Down Clan defeated The Rising in a 4-on-3 Handicap match, forcing The Rising to dissolve. On June 25, 2015, Low Ki announced that he had parted ways with the company.

=== Fourth return to Impact (2017) ===
On the April 20 episode of Impact Wrestling, Low Ki made his return, committing to the Hitman / Agent 47 -inspired gimmick concept that had gotten him fired from NJPW 4 years prior. He defeated Trevor Lee, Andrew Everett, Sonjay Dutt, Dezmond Xavier and Suicide in a six-way match to win his fifth Impact Wrestling X Division Championship. As champion, he would make appearances in the United Kingdom, defeating Mark Haskins for 4 Front Wrestling and Ultimo Tiger for Pro Wrestling Pride. At the Impact Wrestling taping that occurred in Mumbai, India, on May 30 Dutt pinned then X Division Champion Low Ki to win his championship. At the July 6 Impact Wrestling tapings, Low Ki turned heel again by attacking Dutt during his Championship celebration, leading to a two out of three falls match at Slammiversary XV in which Ki was unsuccessful in regaining the X-Division Championship. After that, he was joined with the Latin American Xchange (LAX), starting a storyline with the Impact World Champion Alberto El Patron. Ki was scheduled to face Alberto for the title at Bound for Glory, but since Impact stripped him from the title, the match was cancelled. Instead, Eli Drake was crowned new champion and Johnny Impact was pointed as the challenger at Bound for Glory. On August 23, it was reported that Silvestry had parted ways with Impact. Sources agreed that Silvestry had made the decision to leave, but disagreed whether the departure was over financial or creative differences.

=== Major League Wrestling (2018–2021) ===
Low Ki debuted in Major League Wrestling (MLW) in 2018 as a heel, where Salina de la Renta became his manager. His first match for the promotion was on January 11, where he and MVP went to a draw. On the July 20 episode of Fusion, Low Ki defeated Shane Strickland to win the MLW World Heavyweight Championship He would follow that win with successful defences against John Hennigan and Fenix. On November 10 Low Ki defended his championship against Daga, where he won after ripping a portion of Daga's ear off. Low Ki would also defeat Strickland in a rematch on November 23, where Ki ripped out a piece of Strickland's hair before pinning him. He would hold the title 205 days, losing it to Tom Lawlor at SuperFight on February 2, 2019. Low Ki was announced as part of the MLW roster that would be present at the company's relaunch following their hiatus due to the COVID-19 pandemic.

== Other media ==
Silvestry has also made an appearance in the TNA Impact video game as Senshi, where he also did the voice and motion-capture of the fictional wrestling character, Suicide.

=== Video games ===
Year	Title	Role	Notes
2008	TNA Impact!	Suicide and Senshi	Voice and motion-capture

== Personal life ==
Silvestry is an avid Twitter user, and has been criticized for spreading conspiracy theories and anti-vaccine misinformation, particularly about the Fukushima disaster, mRNA and COVID-19 related vaccines, and on mask usage. He has re-posted and has commented on numerous statements surrounding Disney (including one stating that the people working there are satanic pedophiles), weather modification, the LGBT+ groomer theory (including a reference to LGBT+ people as "perverts"), and a desire to execute doctors who promoted the COVID-19 vaccine.

Silvestry is fluent in Spanish and is of Italian and Puerto Rican descent.

== Championships and accomplishments ==
- AAA
  - Tag Team Tournament (2006) – with Homicide, AJ Styles and Samoa Joe
- East Coast Wrestling Association
  - ECWA Tag Team Championship (2 times) – with American Dragon (1) and Xavier (1)
  - ECWA Hall of Fame (Class of 2007)
  - Super 8 Tournament (2001)
- Florida Championship Wrestling
  - FCW Florida Tag Team Championship (1 time) – with Michael McGillicutty
- Future of Wrestling
  - FOW Heavyweight Championship (1 time)
- Future Wrestling Alliance
  - FWA Heavyweight Championship (1 time)
- House of Glory
  - HOG Crown Jewel Championship (1 time)
- Impact Championship Wrestling
  - ICW Championship (1 time)
- Independent Wrestling Association Mid-South
  - Ted Petty Invitational (2006)
- International Wrestling Cartel
  - IWC Super Indies Championship (1 time)
- Jersey All Pro Wrestling
  - JAPW Heavyweight Championship (3 times)
  - JAPW Light Heavyweight Championship (1 time)
  - JAPW Hall of Fame (2016)
- Jersey Championship Wrestling
  - JCW Championship (1 time)
  - JCW Tag Team Championships (1 time) – with Mafia
- Long Island Wrestling Federation
  - LIWF Light Heavyweight Championship (1 time)
- Major League Wrestling
  - MLW World Heavyweight Championship (1 time)
- Midwest Championship Wrestling
  - MCW Tag Team Championship (1 time) – with Airborne
- Millennium Wrestling Federation
  - MWF Heavyweight Championship (1 time, final)
- New Japan Pro-Wrestling
  - IWGP Junior Heavyweight Championship (3 times)
- Pro Wrestling Zero-One
  - NWA International Lightweight Tag Team Championship (1 time) – with Leonardo Spanky
  - NWA/UPW/Zero-One International Junior Heavyweight Championship (1 time)
- Premiere Wrestling Federation
  - PWF Heavyweight Championship (1 time)
- Pro Wrestling Guerrilla
  - PWG World Championship (1 time)
  - Battle of Los Angeles (2008)
- Pro Wrestling Illustrated
  - Ranked No. 26 of the top 500 singles wrestlers in the PWI 500 in 2003
- Pro Wrestling World-1
  - World-1 Openweight Championship (1 time)
- Ring of Honor
  - ROH Championship (1 time, inaugural)
  - ROH Championship Tournament (2002)
- NWA: Total Nonstop Action/Total Nonstop Action/Impact Wrestling
  - NWA World Tag Team Championship (3 times) – with Christopher Daniels and Elix Skipper^{1}
  - TNA / Impact X Division Championship (5 times)
  - NWA World Tag Team Championship Tournament (2003) – with Christopher Daniels
  - Feast or Fired (2007 – Pink Slip)
- USA Pro Wrestling
  - USA Tag Team Championship (1 time) – with Xavier
- World Wrestling Entertainment
  - NXT winner (season two)
- World Xtreme Wrestling
  - WXW Cruiserweight Championship (1 time)
- Wrecking Ball Wrestling
  - Match of the Year (2011) vs. Charlie Haas
  - Superstar of the Year (2011)
- Wrestling Observer Newsletter
  - Most Underrated (2010)
  - Worst Worked Match of the Year (2006) TNA Reverse Battle Royal on TNA Impact!

== Notes ==
^{1} Low Ki defended the title with either Daniels or Skipper under the Freebird Rule.
