= FOW International Heavyweight Championship =

Professional wrestling championship

Details
- Promotion: Future of Wrestling
- Date established: April 24, 1999
- Date retired: December 08, 2012
Statistics
- First champion(s): Cyborg
- Final champion(s): Johnny Vandal
- Most reigns: Johnny Vandal (3 reigns)
- Longest reign: Bruno Sassi (483 days)
- Shortest reign: Chasyn Rance (1 day)

The FOW International Heavyweight Championship was a professional wrestling title in American independent promotion Future of Wrestling. The title was created when Cyborg won the title in Lima, Peru on April 24, 1999. It was defended throughout southern Florida, most often in Davie, Plantation, Pembroke Pines and occasionally in Ft. Lauderdale and Tampa, Florida. During the first half of 1999, the title was also defended in Lima and during later international tours to Peru and Saudi Arabia. There have been a total of 13 recognized individual champions, who have had a combined 15 official reigns.

== Title history ==
| No. | Wrestlers | Reigns together | Date | Days held | Place | Notes |
|---|---|---|---|---|---|---|
| 1 | Cyborg | 1 | April 24, 1999 | 31 | Lima, Peru | |
| 2 | Anthony Adonis | 1 | May 25, 1999 | 68 | Tampa, Florida | |
| 3 | J-Dawg | 1 | August 1, 1999 | 55 | Lima, Peru | |
| 4 | Billy Fives | 1 | September 25, 1999 | 42 | Pembroke Pines, Florida | |
| 5 | Chasyn Rance | 1 | November 6, 1999 | 1 | Davie, Florida | Fabulous Frank, Fives' manager, defended the title against Rance. |
| 6 | Billy Fives | 1^{(2)} | November 7, 1999 | 53 | N/A | FOW changed their minds on letting a manager defend a title for their competitor and returned the title to Fives. |
| 7 | Warlock | 1 | December 30, 1999 | 44 | Davie, Florida | |
| 8 | Bobby Brooks | 1 | February 12, 2000 | 43 | Ft. Lauderdale, Florida | |
| 9 | The Blackhart | 1 | March 26, 2000 | 475 | Ft. Lauderdale, Florida | |
| 10 | Bruno Sassi | 1 | July 14, 2001 | 483 | Davie, Florida | |
| 11 | David Babylon | 1 | November 9, 2002 | – | Plantation, Florida | David Babylon remains champion until the promotion closes in early 2003. |
Title vacant.
| 12 | Maxx Stardom | 1 | October 21, 2011 | 134 | Boca Raton, Florida | Win's championship in a Rumble. |
| 13 | Johnny Vandal | 1 | March 03, 2012 | 63 | Hollywood, Florida | |
| 14 | Lince Dorado | 1 | May 05, 2012 | 14 | Orlando, Florida | |
| 15 | Johnny Vandal | 2 | May 19, 2012 | 85 | Orlando, Florida | |
| 16 | Craig Classic | 1 | August 12, 2012 | 17 | Tokyo, Japan | |
| 17 | Johnny Vandal | 3 | August 29, 2012 | 101 | Tokyo, Japan | |
Title Retired On December 08, 2012.

== Combined reigns ==
| Rank | Wrestler | No. of reigns | Combined days |
|---|---|---|---|
| 1 | Bruno Sassi | 1 | 483 |
| 2 | The Blackhart | 1 | 473 |
| 3 | Johnny Vandal | 3 | 249 |
| 4 | Maxx Stardom | 1 | 134 |
| 5 | Billy Fives | 1^{(2)} | 95 |
| 6 | Anthony Adonis | 1 | 68 |
| 7 | J-Dawg | 1 | 55 |
| 8 | Warlock | 1 | 44 |
| 9 | Bobby Brooks | 1 | 43 |
| 10 | Cyborg | 1 | 31 |
| 11 | Craig Classic | 1 | 17 |
| 12 | Lince Dorado | 1 | 14 |
| 13 | Chasyn Rance | 1 | 1 |
| 14 | David Babylon | 1 | – |
