= Future of Wrestling =

American wrestling promotion

- Acronym: FOW
- Founded: 1998
- Style: American Wrestling; Hardcore wrestling
- Headquarters: Fort Lauderdale, Florida
- Founder: Bobby Rogers
- Owner: Bobby Rogers (1998–2003)
- Website: TheFOW.com; FutureofWrestling.com (original website)

Future of Wrestling was an American independent wrestling promotion based in southern Florida starting during the late 1990s. Founded by Bobby Rogers, the promotion was a predecessor of Full Impact Pro, Independent Pro Wrestling and NWA Florida and featured independent wrestlers as well as World Championship Wrestling veterans Dusty Rhodes, Kevin Sullivan, Norman Smiley and Curt Hennig, the latter holding the FOW Heavyweight Championship at the time of his death in February 2003, just prior to the promotions closure.

The promotion was associated with Rusty Brooks's School of Hard Knocks, which acted as its training school throughout its five-year history. Former mainstays such as Low Ki, The Shane Twins and Phi Delta Slam (Bruno Sassi & Big Tilly) have since signed with Total Nonstop Action Wrestling. In 2005, former FOW Tag Team Champion Hassan Assad signed a developmental contract with World Wrestling Entertainment to compete in its developmental territory Ohio Valley Wrestling.

== History ==
In early 1998, Bobby Rogers began promoting in local gyms and small auditoriums in the Broward-Palm Beach area with |Johnny Evans being crowned as the first FOW Heavyweight Champion in May while The Masked Assassins (Masked Assassin I & Masked Assassin II) won the FOW Tag Team Championship later that month. During the next year, he soon developed a talented roster of local independent wrestlers which included Antonio Banks, best known as MontelVontavious Porter.

The following year, the promotion toured South America during which time the FOW International Championship was created with Cyborg winning the title in Lima, Peru on April 24, 1999. The promotion would also begin broadcasting its local televised events through its website and eventually DVD releases.

On March 13, the promotion held one of its biggest shows, King of Carnage, at the Davie Rodeo Arena in Fort Lauderdale, Florida. With over 3,000 in attendance, the supercard included Barry Horowitz, The Sandman, Christopher Daniels, The Bad Street Boys (Joey Matthews & Christian York) and ECWA Heavyweight Champion Scoot Andrews defending his title against Low Ki and Mike Sullivan in a "Three Way Dance". In the semi-main event, Kevin Sullivan defeated Dusty Rhodes, Terry Funk and Abdullah the Butcher in a "Fatal Four Way" match while Al Bino defeated FOW Light Heavyweight Champion J-Dawg for the title in a match including Johnny Vandal. The promotion received further exposure from the show which was released on dvd soon after. In July, the promotion also toured Saudi Arabia.

Its success was short-lived however as the promotion began experiencing financial difficulties, which worsened as promoter Bobby Rogers would be involved in legal problems during this time. The promotion was forced to close in early 2003.

== Revival ==
In the ending weeks of 2010, original founder, Bobby Rogers surfaced after years away and announced the relaunch of Future Of Wrestling. The FOW held an event on January 29, 2011, in Davie, Florida with many of the promotions former stars, combined with the next generation of wrestlers in this territory. Billy Fives won a single elimination tournament to become a 6 time FOW Champion and Tommy & Johnny Vandal won a Tag Team scramble to become the NEW FOW Tag Team Champions. Later that night, Tommy Vandal was named the #1 Contender for the FOW championship. At the following event, Atomic August on August 6, Tommy Vandal Captured the title from mentor Billy Fives.

== Championships ==
- FOW Heavyweight Championship
- FOW International Heavyweight Championship
- FOW Hardcore Championship
- FOW Light Heavyweight Championship
- FOW Tag Team Championship

== Media ==
- FOW King of Carnage. Prod. Bobby Rogers. DVD. Future of Wrestling/World Wrestling Network, 2003.
