= Eddie Graham Memorial Battle of the Belts =

- Promotion: Full Impact Pro
- Date: 2007, 2009

The Eddie Graham Memorial Battle of the Belts was an annual professional wrestling memorial show produced by the Full Impact Pro (FIP) promotion, typically held between February or March. The event was held in memory of Eddie Graham, longtime promoter of the Championship Wrestling from Florida (CWF), the first held for Graham since the original Eddie Graham Memorial Shows in 1987-88. The event's title, in particular, was used as a homage to the popular Battle of the Belts supercards promoted by Graham during the 1980s. Mike Graham, Eddie's son and organizer of the original "Eddie Graham Memorial Show", opened for the show to speak about his father's legacy and introduced the FIP Florida Heritage Championship.

This version, unlike the previous memorial supercard, was held as a one-night 8-man single-elimination tournament. The first edition was held on March 10, 2007, at the National Guard Armory in Crystal River, Florida and which saw the winner, Erick Stevens being crowned the first-ever FIP Florida Heritage Champion. Dave Prazak and Lenny Leonard were commentators for the first show while Leonard was involved in booking for the second and final "Battle of the Belts". The inaugural show received generally positive reviews. Brad Garoon of 411mania.com rated the event an 8.5, calling it "Stevens' coming out party", and earned the website's "Elite Award".

== Tournament winners ==
Tournament	Year	Winner	Total won
EGM-Cup I	2007	Erick Stevens	1
EGM-Cup II	2009	Davey Richards	1

== Show results ==
=== Eddie Graham Memorial Battle of the Belts (2007) ===
March 10, 2007 in Crystal River, Florida (National Guard Armory)

No.	Results	Stipulations	Times
1	Roderick Strong defeated Jimmy Rave	First Round Tournament match	09:02
2	Jay Briscoe defeated Larry Sweeney	First Round Tournament match	10:11
3	Erick Stevens defeated SHINGO	First Round Tournament match	02:12
4	Delirious defeated Mark Briscoe	First Round Tournament match	03:51
5	Roderick Strong defeated Jay Briscoe	Semi Final Tournament match	13:25
6	Erick Stevens defeated Delirious	Semi Final Tournament match	15:12
7	The YRR (Chasyn Rance, Kenny King and Sal Rinauro) defeated Jerrelle Clark, Kory Chavis and Seth Delay	Six-man tag team match	17:11
8	Erick Stevens defeated Roderick Strong	Tournament Finals match	21:16

==== Tournament brackets ====
This was a one-night tournament which took place on March 10, 2007. The tournament brackets were:

Quarterfinals
Roderick Strong	Pin
Jimmy Rave
Jay Briscoe	Pin
Larry Sweeney
SHINGO	Pin
Erick Stevens
Delirious	Sub
Mark Briscoe

Semifinals
Roderick Strong	Pin
Jay Briscoe
Erick Stevens
Delirious	Pin

Finals
Roderick Strong
Erick Stevens	Pin

=== Eddie Graham Memorial Battle of the Belts (2009) ===
February 8, 2009 in Brooksville, Florida (National Guard Armory)

No.	Results	Stipulations
1	Roderick Strong defeated Necro Butcher	First Round Tournament match
2	Chris Jones defeated Austin Aries	First Round Tournament match
3	Davey Richards defeated Erick Stevens	First Round Tournament match
4	El Generico defeated Nigel McGuinness	First Round Tournament match
5	Roderick Strong defeated Chris Jones	Semi Final Tournament match
6	Davey Richards defeated El Generico	Semi Final Tournament match
7	MsChif (c) defeated Mercedes Martinez	Singles match for the SHIMMER Championship
8	Tyler Black (c) defeated Delirious	Single match for the FIP Heavyweight Championship
9	Davey Richards defeated Roderick Strong	Tournament Finals match
(c) / – the champion(s) heading into the match

==== Tournament brackets ====
This was a one-night tournament which took place on February 8, 2009. The tournament brackets were:

Quarterfinals
Roderick Strong	Pin
Necro Butcher
Chris Jones	Pin
Austin Aries
Davey Richards	Pin
Erick Stevens
El Generico	Pin
Nigel McGuinness

Semifinals
Roderick Strong	Pin
Chris Jones
Davey Richards
El Generico	Pin

Finals
Roderick Strong
Davey Richards	Pin
