= Briscoe Brothers =

Professional wrestling tag team

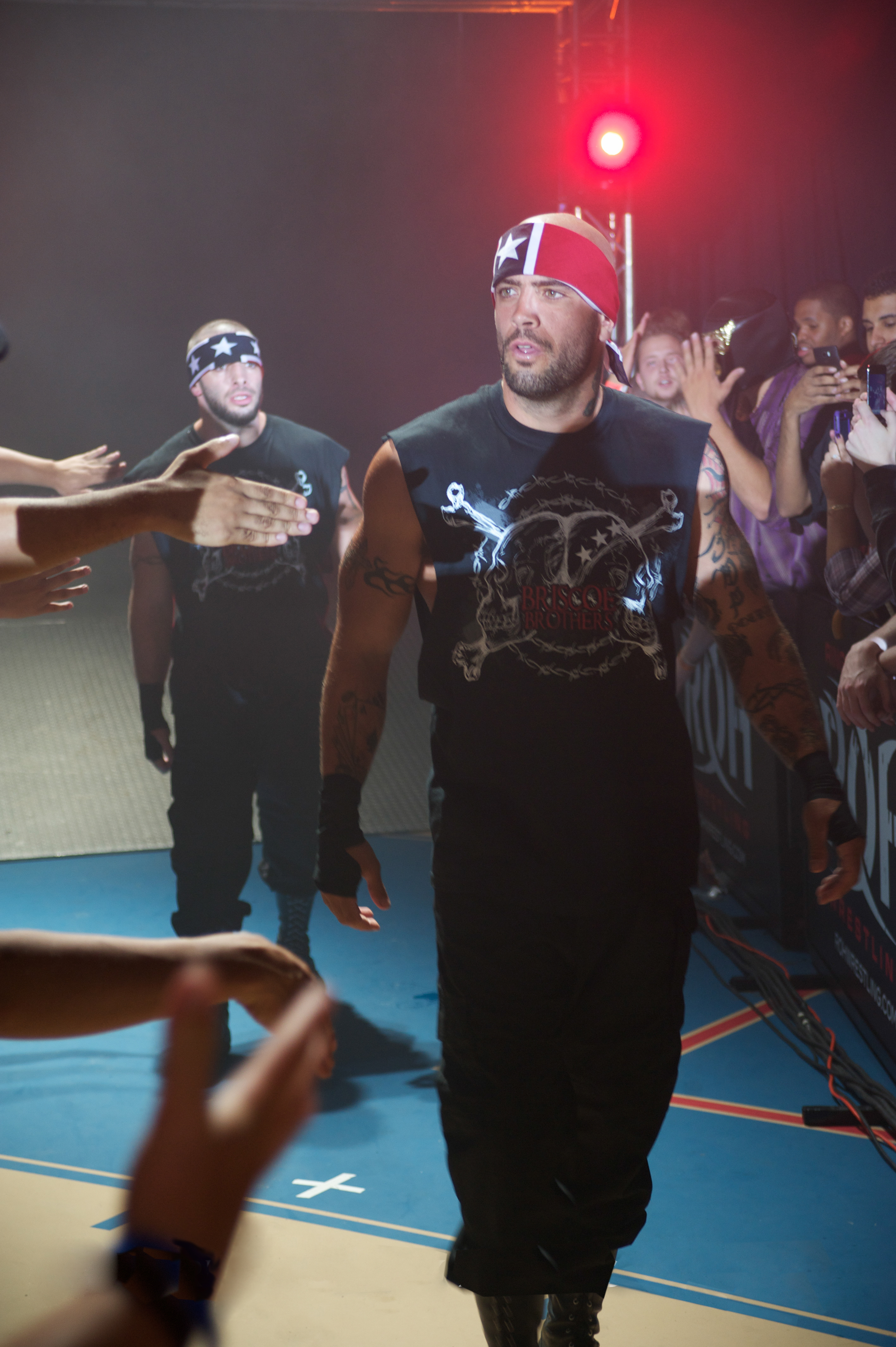
- Jay (front) and Mark (back) in 2011

Tag team
- Members: Jay Briscoe; Mark Briscoe
- Name(s): The Briscoe Brothers; The Briscoes; The Briscoe Brothers 2000; The Midnight Outlaws
- Combined billed weight: 460 lb (210 kg)
- Hometown: Laurel, Delaware, U.S. Sandy Fork, Delaware, U.S. Southern Delaware
- Debut: May 20, 2000
- Years active: 2000–2023
- Trained by: CZW Training School; ECWA Wrestletech; Glenn Osborne; Jon Dahmer; Van Hammer

The Briscoe Brothers, also called The Briscoes, were a professional wrestling tag team consisting of American brothers Jay Briscoe (Jamin Pugh, 1984–2023) and Mark Briscoe (Mark Pugh, born 1985). They were known for their 20-year tenure with the American professional wrestling promotion Ring of Honor (ROH), where they were record-setting 13-time ROH World Tag Team Champions.

The duo were featured on Ring of Honor's first-ever event on February 23, 2002, and other than an 18-month hiatus from August 2004 to February 2006, the brothers were focal points of the company throughout its history, feuding with some of its biggest stars. The Briscoes were 15-time world tag team champions overall with a record 13 ROH World Tag Team Championship reigns, one IWGP Tag Team Championship reign in New Japan Pro-Wrestling (NJPW), and one Impact World Tag Team Championship reign. They also held Pro Wrestling Noah's GHC Junior Heavyweight Tag Team Championship once, were winners of the 2022 Crockett Cup in the National Wrestling Alliance (NWA), and held numerous titles on the independent circuit.

They were also part of three Six-Man Tag Team Championship teams - winning the ROH World Six-Man Tag Team Championship once with Bully Ray and NJPW's NEVER Openweight 6-Man Tag Team Championship twice (with Toru Yano). On January 31, 2022, they were the inaugural inductees into the ROH Hall of Fame. As singles competitors, Jay Briscoe was a two-time ROH World Champion, while Mark Briscoe won the 2013 Honor Rumble.

The Briscoe Brothers teamed together from 2000 until Jay Briscoe's sudden death in a car accident on January 17, 2023.

== Early life ==
The Pugh brothers, Jamin (Jay) (January 25, 1984 – January 17, 2023) and Mark (born January 18, 1985) grew up in Laurel, Delaware. As high schoolers, both received honorable mention All-State honors their junior and senior years for football, Jay as a fullback and a linebacker and Mark as a tight end and a linebacker. At one point, both were signed to play for Wesley College (Delaware), a fact even used in wrestling storyline at one point, at ROH Beating the Odds, to explain an absence from which they were returning.

The brothers first became interested in wrestling in their youth by watching the World Wrestling Federation on one of the two channels their television could receive. Originally, they practiced wrestling moves with one another on a trampoline before the family built a wrestling ring in their backyard. From the beginning, the two of them worked on honing their craft, taping their moves and trying to improve them. Despite the fact that their dad was a coach for their high school's wrestling team, they did not participate in amateur wrestling in their high school years. Their first foray into professional wrestling came with the East Coast Wrestling Association (ECWA), while they were still in high school. While their mother, Jana, was in line to purchase tickets to attend a wrestling event, a promoter for the ECWA approached her and asked if her sons had a tape of themselves wrestling. This led to the brothers debuting for ECWA on May 20, 2000, under the ring names "Jay and Mark Briscoe".

== Professional wrestling career ==
=== Combat Zone Wrestling (2001–2002, 2003) ===
Jay and Mark Briscoe made their debuts for Combat Zone Wrestling (CZW) at Delaware Invasion on January 20, 2001, being brought in, teaming with independent wrestler Eddie Valentine, to job as part of a three-on-one handicap match against Trent Acid. At the inaugural Best of the Best event, a show somewhat atypical of CZW in that it is a tournament spotlighting athletic junior heavyweight wrestling as opposed to violent hardcore matches, the two advanced past the first round in a three-way match with Nick Mondo where the stipulation was whoever took the fall would be eliminated. They were then matched against each other in the second round, with Jay winning and advancing further. This match was seen by fans as the best of the tournament, and seen in retrospect as having been responsible in large part for helping launch the brothers' careers, as they were new to the independent circuit and very young at the time.

After losing in title opportunities at Breakaway Brawl and A New Beginning, the brothers won the CZW Tag Team Championship on July 14, 2001, as they defeated the original H8 Club at H8 Club: Dead? They lost it, however, in their first defense, to Johnny Kashmere and Justice Pain on July 28, 2001, at What About Lobo? Mark wasn't used for several months after that, but Jay continued on as a singles wrestler in that time, even facing Justice Pain for the CZW Heavyweight Championship at September Slam on September 8, which he did not win.

At the end of 2001 and into 2002, CZW's territory (that is, the area at which they held the majority of their events) was shifting from Sewell, New Jersey, to Philadelphia, Pennsylvania, in order to hold events regularly at the old ECW arena, beginning with December 15's Cage of Death 3. At this event, they faced Nick Gage and Nate Hatred, but wore masks and were identified as The Midnight Outlaws. This was likely to get around the fact that Jay was only 17 and Mark only 16 at the time; this meant, as they were under 18 years of age, that they could not legally work in a sport wrestling exhibition in the state of Pennsylvania. As CZW regularly began holding shows in the Philadelphia area, the Midnight Outlaws made appearances at the next four CZW events. At A Higher Level of Pain on April 13, 2002, Jay appeared across the ring from the Midnight Outlaws, tagging with Ruckus against Mark and someone else. By this time, he had turned 18. Jay and Ruckus were won the match, and this was the last time either Jay or Mark appeared for CZW until April 12, 2003, where Jay and Mark both returned for Best of the Best 3. Jay was a surprise entrant after being taunted by A.J. Styles, and Mark filling in for the injured Ruckus. Jay advanced to the semi-finals, where he lost to B-Boy, and Mark lost his fill-in match to Sonjay Dutt. The two faced off with the Backseat Boyz for the CZW World Tag Team Championship at Truth or Consequences on June 14, but failed to win the belts.

=== Jersey All Pro Wrestling (2001, 2002, 2005) ===
The Brothers appeared for Jersey All Pro Wrestling (JAPW), in the ECW arena, on March 24, 2001, at March Madness Night 2, losing to Insane Dragon and Dixie in the opener. It is unclear how, if at all, JAPW's ownership and management worked around Pennsylvania's child labor law, as both brothers were underage at the time of this and two subsequent appearances in the old ECW arena. They made three other appearances in JAPW in 2001, all against Insane Dragon & Dixie – one a victory, one that ended in a no contest due to outside interference, and the last an unsuccessful challenge for Dragon and Dixie's JAPW Tag Team Championship on June 15 at Here to Stay.

They made subsequent appearances for JAPW in 2002, first losing to The S.A.T. on May 3 at May Madness. They then re-entered the JAPW Tag Team Championship picture, wrestling in a three-team match against Da Hit Squad and Wasted Youth, the team of Insane Dragon & Deranged, to fill the vacant championship at Unfinished Business on July 13, 2002. It was Jay and Insane Dragon, however, who emerged as champions, after scoring simultaneous pinfalls on the members of Da Hit Squad. The six men went on to meet in a rematch of sorts at the next event, Royal Consequences 2 on August 10. Jay and Dragon defended the title against Da Hit Squad and the team of Mark and Deranged in a tables, ladders, and chairs match, which Da Hit Squad won. Two shows later, on September 20 at Family Crisis 2, Da Hit Squad successfully retained the title over the Briscoes in a regular match.

The Brothers did not appear for JAPW again until late 2005, again in a tables, ladders, and chairs match for the tag team title, this time against the teams of Teddy Hart and Homicide, the Backseat Boyz, and The S.A.T. The match, which took place at JAPW's 8th Year Anniversary Show, was won Hart and Homicide. At the next show, Fall Out, the S.A.T. defeated them and thus became number one contenders to the tag team championship. More recent JAPW appearances came in early 2006, losing along with the Outcast Killers to the S.A.T. once again at Wild Card II in a tag team title match, and then at Brotherly Love to the team of Sabu and Sonjay Dutt, a match they also lost. In October 2008, the Briscoes competed at JAPW's 11th Anniversary Show against LAX (Homicide and Hernandez). During a brawl outside the ring, Mark suffered a large gash on the side of his head.

=== Ring of Honor (2002–2004) ===
The Briscoe Brothers have wrestled most extensively for Ring of Honor. Jay wrestled on ROH's first-ever show, The Era of Honor Begins, losing to Amazing Red. Mark seconded him to the ring but could not wrestle because of Pennsylvania's child labor law (most of ROH's earliest shows took place in Philadelphia). Jay wrestled each of ROH's next four shows, against Spanky, Tony Mamaluke, Doug Williams, and James Maritato, losing to all but Mamaluke. At Honor Invades Boston, when Mark was able to perform, he defeated his brother, in the second-to-last match of the night. The Brothers went on briefly to feud against each other, during which time Jay scored a non-title win over ROH Champion Xavier at Glory By Honor. This earned him a title shot at All-Star Extravaganza, which he did not win. At Scramble Madness, back in Boston, the brothers' storyline involved them picking their own partners for a tag team match. Jay picked past foe Amazing Red, whereas Mark's partner was Christopher Daniels, as he seemingly joined The Prophecy. Daniels pinned Red to win the match. The Brothers' feud against one another concluded at the First Anniversary Show, when Jay defeated Mark in a match, and the two hugged afterward to signify their reunion. Mark never explicitly left the Prophecy, but in forming a team with his brother, he stopped teaming with them.

Newly united as a team in ROH, the Briscoes began, in 2003, to feud with A.J. Styles and Amazing Red, then holders of the ROH Tag Team Championship, losing in title matches at Night of Champions, The Epic Encounter, and Death Before Dishonor, which by stipulation was their last match for the title for as long as Styles and Red held it. Before the last match, a poll was held on ROH's website, asking the fans if they wanted to see a third match between the two teams. Over 80% of respondents voted 'yes'. At Beating the Odds, they returned from a brief absence to score a pair of wins which were depicted in the storyline as being improbable, Mark over ROH veteran B. J. Whitmer and Jay in a Four Corner Survival match with ROH World Champion Samoa Joe, NWA World Heavyweight Champion A.J. Styles, and Chris Sabin, pinning Sabin to earn a future title shot at Joe. At ROH's Maryland debut, Tradition Continues, Joe retained over Jay.

The Brothers took part in the gauntlet match at Glory By Honor 2, which was held to fill the tag team championship left vacant by Red suffering a serious knee injury. They defeated and eliminated the Special K team of Hydro and Angeldust as well as The Ring Crew Express, before being eliminated by the other Special K team in the match, Izzy and Dixie, due to outside interference from Angeldust. After Izzy and Dixie later won the tag team title, the Brothers were granted a shot at it, at Main Event Spectacles. The reason given in the storyline was they were given the shot since they only lost in the gauntlet match because Special K cheated. In the opening segment of that event, they were aligned with Jim Cornette, because, in the storyline, Cornette wanted to create new champions. They attacked his former client, Samoa Joe, who Cornette abandoned since he already was a champion. They went on to win the belts later in the show. At The Conclusion, The Battle Lines Are Drawn, and The Last Stand, which was by stipulation Joe's last shot at the tag team title for as long as the Briscoe Brothers held it, they retained the belts over Joe and a different partner each time, A.J. Styles, Bryan Danielson, and Jerry Lynn respectively. Since Joe took pinfalls at The Conclusion (to Mark) and The Last Stand (to Jay), both brothers subsequently earned shots at his world title. Both fell; Mark at Final Battle 2003 and Jay at At Our Best in a memorable and bloody steel cage match.

They dropped the tag team title to the CM Punk and Colt Cabana at ROH's Chicago-area debut, ROH Reborn: Stage Two, working in ROH for the first time as outward heels. At the next show, Round Robin Challenge III, the title switched three times among the teams in the round robin challenge, the Second City Saints (Punk and Cabana), the Briscoe Brothers, and the Prophecy team of Dan Maff and B. J. Whitmer. The Briscoes defeated Maff and Whitmer in the fourth match of the night to win the title for a second time, and then lost it back to Punk and Cabana in the main event. The Brothers both participated in ROH's inaugural Survival of the Fittest tournament, with Mark going over Alex Shelley in his qualifier and Jay falling to Homicide. Mark did not, however, win the elimination final. After losing a two out of three falls tag team title match to Punk and Cabana at Death Before Dishonor II Part 1, ending that feud, they lost in separate singles matches to members of The Rottweilers the next night. Between that and their victory in tag team action at Testing the Limit, it is likely that a feud was planned between the Briscoes and the Rottweilers.

=== Pro Wrestling Guerrilla (2003, 2006, 2007, 2010, 2011) ===
The Briscoe Brothers have a somewhat checkered history with Pro Wrestling Guerrilla (PWG). They have, numerous times, been announced for events at which they ultimately did not perform, such as when they were scheduled for a PWG World Tag Team Championship match against Roderick Strong and PAC at Giant-Size Annual #4, but wound up being replaced by then-PWG World Champion El Generico and Kevin Steen.

The Briscoes have been involved with the promotion since its early days, debuting at PWG's fourth-ever show Are You Adequately Prepared to Rock? in October 2003, losing to Super Dragon and B-Boy. Due to the costs of bringing them in from the East coast and the sabbatical from the sport the brothers took, they would not appear again until May 20, 2006, at Enchantment Under the Sea, falling to Cape Fear (Quicksilver and El Generico). At the 2006 Battle of Los Angeles, the Briscoes' numerous no-shows were worked into the company's kayfabe when PWG announced days before that they had been pulled from the tournament as punishment. They wound up appearing anyway, attacking Commissioner Dino Winwood on the night one. The next night, they wrestled in a three-way tag team match for the PWG World Tag Team Championship against Homicide and B-Boy and defending champions Arrogance (Chris Bosh and Scott Lost), who went on to retain the titles.

The Briscoes next appeared on May 19 and May 20, 2007, to participate in the inaugural Dynamite Duumvirate Tag Team Title Tournament, created to declare new World Tag Team Champions. After defeating the Kings of Wrestling (Chris Hero and Claudio Castagnoli) in the Opening Round and the Havana Pitbulls (Ricky Reyes and Rocky Romero) in the semifinals, they lost in the Final Round to Roderick Strong and PAC. At ¡Dia de los Dangerous! on February 24, 2008, "Commissioner of Food and Beverage" Excalibur announced that the Briscoe Brothers would return on March 7. That night, the Briscoes challenged for the World Tag Team Championship, but were unable to defeat The Dynasty (Joey Ryan and Scott Lost), following interference from Eddie Kingston and Claudio Castagnoli, members of Human Tornado's stable. The Briscoes were scheduled for the 2008 DDT4, but Mark was unable to perform, causing Jay to wrestle in singles matches against Austin Aries on night one and a Necro Butcher Rules match against Necro Butcher on night two.

After failing to show up to the fifth anniversary show, Life During Wartime on July 6, 2008, Excalibur announced that Jay was "fired" from the company (even though PWG has never been contractual) and wouldn't be allowed to come back. However, nearly two years later on March 20, 2010, it was announced that the Briscoe Brothers would return to the company on April 10 to challenge The Young Bucks (Matt and Nick Jackson) for the World Tag Team Championship. On April 10 at Titannica, the Briscoes made their long-awaited return to the promotion, but were defeated by The Young Bucks. The next month, the brothers competed in the fourth annual DDT4, defeating Kamikaze (Akira Tozawa and Yamato) in the opening round before being eliminated by eventual winners ¡Peligro Abejas! (Paul London and El Generico). On March 4, 2011, the Briscoe Brothers were entered into DDT4 once more, this time losing to the Nightmare Violence Connection (Akira Tozawa and Kevin Steen) in the first round.

=== Sabbatical from wrestling (2004–2005) ===
The brothers went on an extensive hiatus from professional wrestling, beginning in August 2004. As was announced before ROH's Scramble Cage Melee, Mark was injured in a motorcycle accident between Testing the Limit and that show, and thus both brothers had left Ring of Honor. As Jay didn't wish to return to wrestling without his brother, they stopped taking bookings from any company. After making their returns in mid-2005 to Pro Wrestling Unplugged, followed in late 2005 at ROH, the company they had regularly been working for at the time of Mark's accident, hyped their return at the Fourth Anniversary Show in February 2006.

=== Pro Wrestling Unplugged (2005–2006) ===
The Brothers worked for Philadelphia-based Pro Wrestling Unplugged (PWU) since at least September 17, 2005, when they defeated The S.A.T. and All Money is Legal to win the then-vacant PWU Tag Team Championship. They held that title until April 22, 2006, when they dropped it to the S.A.T. After further appearances in 2006, which were all matches they lost, the Briscoe Brothers entered PWU's Pitbull/Public Enemy Memorial Cup on October 20. They advanced past the first round match, winning over the Krash Krew, but in the course of this match, Mark was injured when Jay inadvertently struck him in the mouth with the backswing of a chairshot. Mark was taken to the hospital after the match and subsequently lost a number of teeth and sustained damage to his gums as well.

In their second-round match of the tournament, against Homicide and Ricky Reyes, Mark was replaced by Joker, who subsequently turned on Jay to cost them the match. They made one further appearance, at an event cross-promoted by PWU and Juggalo Championship Wrestling. This was a four-way singles match involving Jay and Mark and the members of the S.A.T. to determine the number-one contender to the PWU World Heavyweight Championship, won by Jose Maximo.

=== Return to ROH (2005–2023) ===
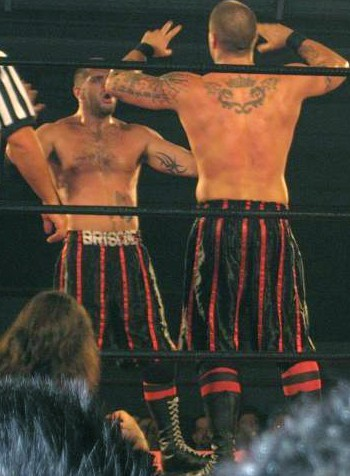
Mark (left) and Jay (right) at a Ring of Honor show in 2006.

The Briscoe Brothers returned to ROH at the Fourth Anniversary Show in 2006, forcibly including themselves in a match that was at first between the teams of Tony Mamaluke and Sal Rinauro and Jason Blade and Kid Mikaze. They won in their re-debut. They then feuded for the tag team championship again, but much as they had against Styles and Red three years earlier, they lost in three shots against the champions at the time, Austin Aries and Roderick Strong, at Ring of Homicide, Destiny, and Unified. As before, the storyline was that this cost them any chance at the belts for as long as those champs held them. It was around this time that the Brothers became enforcers for Jim Cornette, the ROH Commissioner, fighting battles against his enemies, most notably Homicide and his partner Samoa Joe at Glory By Honor V: Night Two and in anything goes, falls count anywhere, elimination match at Dethroned. During this time, they also feuded with Kenta and his partners Davey Richards and Naomichi Marufuji, facing Kenta and Richards at Time to Man Up and Kenta and Marufuji at Glory By Honor V: Night One.

At Fifth Year Festival: Chicago, the Brothers finally reached the top of the mountain again, defeating Christopher Daniels and Matt Sydal to win the tag team championship. Their reign, however, proved to be brief, as they in turn to dropped the belts to Naruki Doi and Shingo Takagi in their first defense, at Fifth Year Festival: Liverpool. After this match, the storyline was that the brothers felt they needed to "man up" due to losing the title in their first defense, just as they had the GHC Junior Heavyweight Tag Team Championship earlier in the year. Thus, the two faced off what was described as "one time only" at Fifth Year Festival: Finale. The match ended in a draw, with both of them unable to answer the referee's standing ten-count. At the next event, All Star Extravaganza III, they won the title back from Doi and Shingo, but in the course of the match Mark was seriously injured attempting a Shooting Star Press to the floor. Mark was kept in the ICU of hospital for two nights, and suffered a seizure there before eventually being released. Two weeks later, at Fighting Spirit, Mark made an unannounced return, entering through the crowd to come to his brother's side during his match with Erick Stevens against Kevin Steen and El Generico. The storyline was that with Mark injured, Jay was tagging with Stevens as a replacement. The No Remorse Corps then ran in and attacked Stevens, and Jay was momentarily left without a partner until Mark entered. Mark eventually suffered the fall in the match after several bumps to the head. They then began to feud with Steen and Generico. After successfully retaining the tag title over Claudio Castagnoli and Matt Sydal at ROH's first pay-per-view Respect is Earned, Steen and Generico showed up and immediately demanded their title shot; the scene followed with a wild brawl all over the building. The feud was followed on both ROH's standard canon, with Steen defeating Mark at A Fight at the Roxbury, and the PPV series, with the Brothers successfully retaining the tag team title against Steen and Generico at Driven, after which Steen repeatedly attacked both brothers with a ladder. The Briscoes then retained over Steen and Generico in a steel cage match at Caged Rage and in ROH's first-ever ladder match at Man Up.

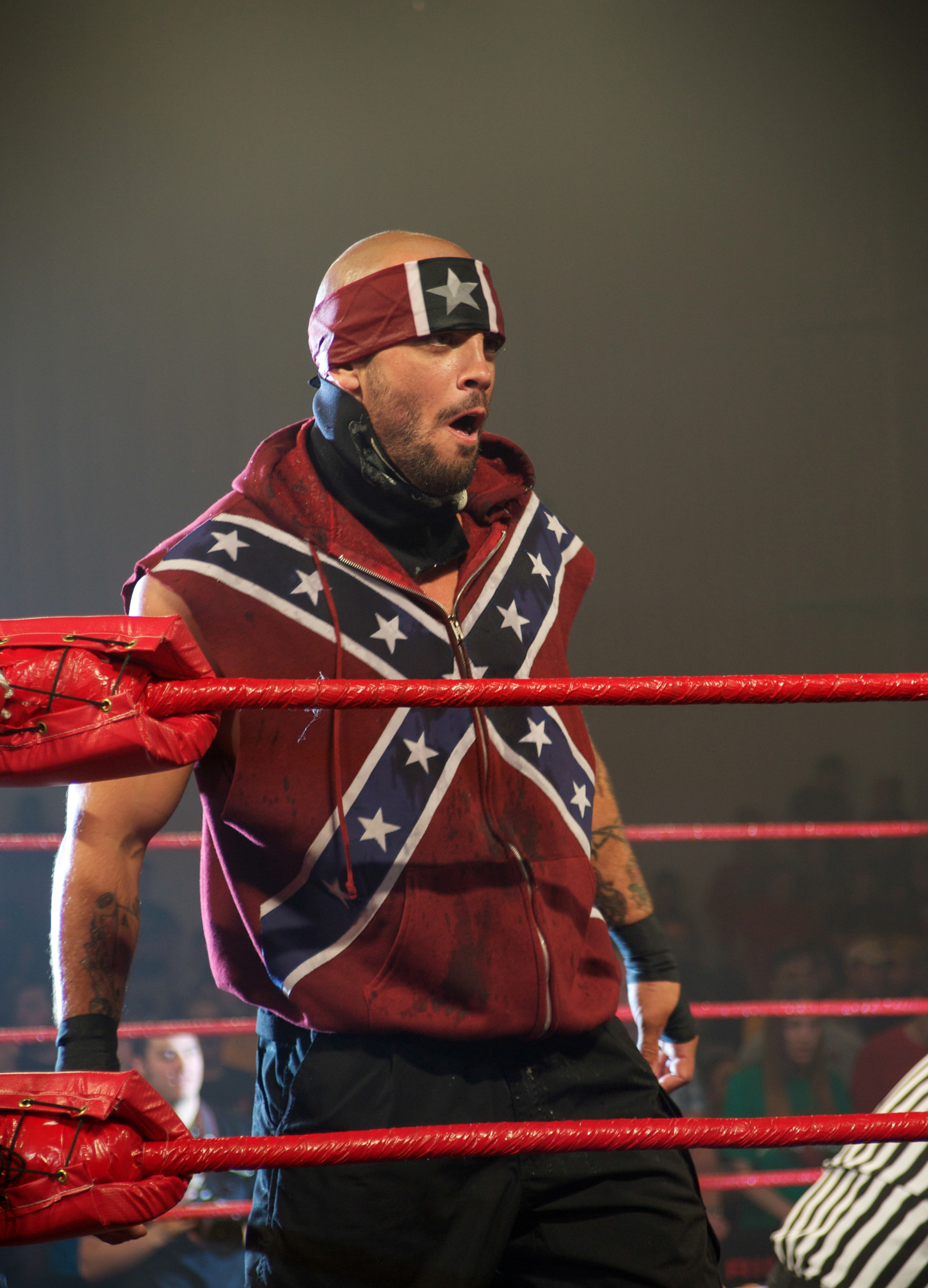
Jay Briscoe in 2011

After the ladder match, Jimmy Jacobs and the other members of The Age of the Fall attacked the Brothers and hanged Jay upside-down from the apparatus which held up the belts. It was announced that this would not be included in the footage shown on PPV. After Mark was again injured in a motorcycle accident, though considerably less serious, Jay was alone in a match held at the taping for ROH's fourth PPV, Undeniable. This was an anything goes match against Necro Butcher of the Age of the Fall, which he did not win. On November 30, the Briscoes had a match which was taped to be included in Undeniable, a tag team title defense against Davey Richards and Rocky Romero, which they won. At Final Battle 2007, the Briscoes lost the ROH World Tag Team Championship to Jimmy Jacobs and Tyler Black of The Age of the Fall, but won it back on April 12, 2008, at Injustice, defeating Richards and Romero, who had since won the championship from Jacobs and Black. On April 20, ROH's official website reported that Mark had sustained a wrist injury due to Jacobs stabbing him with his trademark rail spike and stood to miss up to six months. The next day, the company announced that Jay and a partner of his choosing would continue to be recognized as the tag team champions. This partner was later revealed to be Austin Aries. After their successful defense against Jacobs & Black on May 10 at A New Level, the championship was declared vacant. Mark returned to active competition at Northern Navigation on July 25, teaming with Jay and Aries to defeat The Age of the Fall in a no disqualification match. On December 19, 2009, at Final Battle 2009, the Briscoes won the ROH World Tag Team Championship for a sixth time by defeating The American Wolves (Davey Richards and Eddie Edwards). They lost the championship to the Kings of Wrestling (Chris Hero and Claudio Castagnoli) at The Big Bang! pay-per-view on April 3. The Briscoe Brothers ended their feud with the Kings of Wrestling on December 18 at Final Battle 2010, where they teamed with their father Mike "Papa" Briscoe in a six man tag team match, where they defeated Hero, Castagnoli and their manager Shane Hagadorn. On March 19 at Manhattan Mayhem IV, the Briscoe Brothers suffered an upset loss against the All Night Xpress (Kenny King and Rhett Titus). On September 17 at Death Before Dishonor IX, the All Night Xpress defeated the Briscoe Brothers in a ladder match to become the number one contenders to the ROH World Tag Team Championship. At Final Battle 2011 on December 23, the Briscoes defeated Wrestling's Greatest Tag Team (Charlie Haas and Shelton Benjamin) to win the ROH World Tag Team Championship for the seventh time. On May 12, 2012, at Border Wars, the Briscoe Brothers lost the title back to Haas and Benjamin. On December 16 at Final Battle 2012: Doomsday, the Briscoe Brothers defeated S.C.U.M. (Jimmy Jacobs and Steve Corino) and Caprice Coleman and Cedric Alexander in a three-way match to win the ROH World Tag Team Championship for the eighth time. They lost the title to Bobby Fish and Kyle O'Reilly on March 2, 2013, at the 11th Anniversary Show.

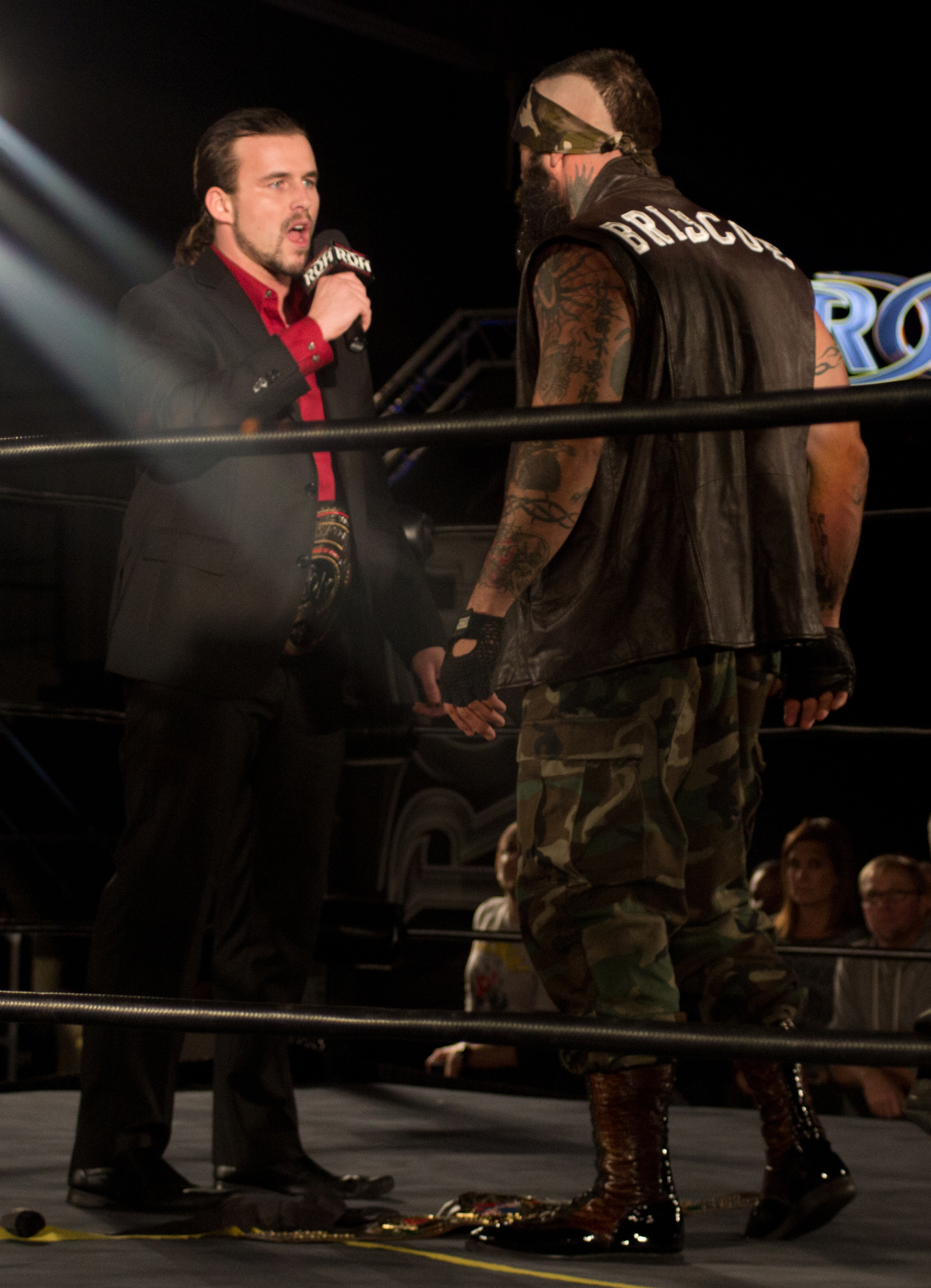
Jay Briscoe confronting Adam Cole over which of them is the real ROH World Champion; Briscoe's title belt is on the floor between them, while Cole is wearing his.

On April 5 at Supercard of Honor VII, Jay defeated Kevin Steen to become the ROH World Champion. Jay made his first successful title defense on May 4 at Border Wars 2013 against Adam Cole. On June 22 at Best in the World 2013, Jay successfully defended the ROH World Championship against Mark. The following day, Jay made another successful title defense against Matt Hardy. During the weekend ROH shot injury angles with both Briscoes. On June 25, it was reported that both Jay's and Mark's contracts with ROH had expired and would not be renewed. On July 3, Ring of Honor stripped Jay of the ROH World Championship. On July 16, ROH announced Mark as the sixteenth and final entrant in a tournament to determine the new ROH World Champion, while also noting that Jay was slated to be out of action for three to six months. Mark was eliminated from the tournament in his first round match on July 27 by Adam Cole. Jay returned to ROH on September 20 at Death Before Dishonor XI to hand the title belt to the winner of the tournament, Adam Cole, who proceeded to attack him afterwards. On September 28, Mark won the Honor Rumble to earn a shot at the ROH World Championship, but was later that same event defeated by Cole. On October 26 at Glory By Honor XII, Jay entered a storyline, where he introduced his own ROH World Championship belt titled the "Real World Title", claiming that he was the true champion since he had never been defeated for the title. Jay received his shot at the ROH World Championship on December 14 at Final Battle 2013, but was defeated by Cole in a three-way match, which also included Michael Elgin. On February 8, 2014, Jay defeated Cole to retain his version of the ROH World Championship. The two world titles were unified in a ladder match on April 4 at Supercard of Honor VIII, where Cole was victorious, following outside interference from Matt Hardy and Michael Bennett. On May 17, the Briscoe Brothers took part in the ROH/New Japan Pro-Wrestling co-produced War of the Worlds iPPV, where they unsuccessfully challenged Bullet Club (Doc Gallows and Karl Anderson) for the IWGP Tag Team Championship. On September 6 at All Star Extravaganza 6, Jay recaptured the ROH World Championship from Michael Elgin, becoming only the second two-time holder of the title. He lost the title to Jay Lethal on June 19, 2015.

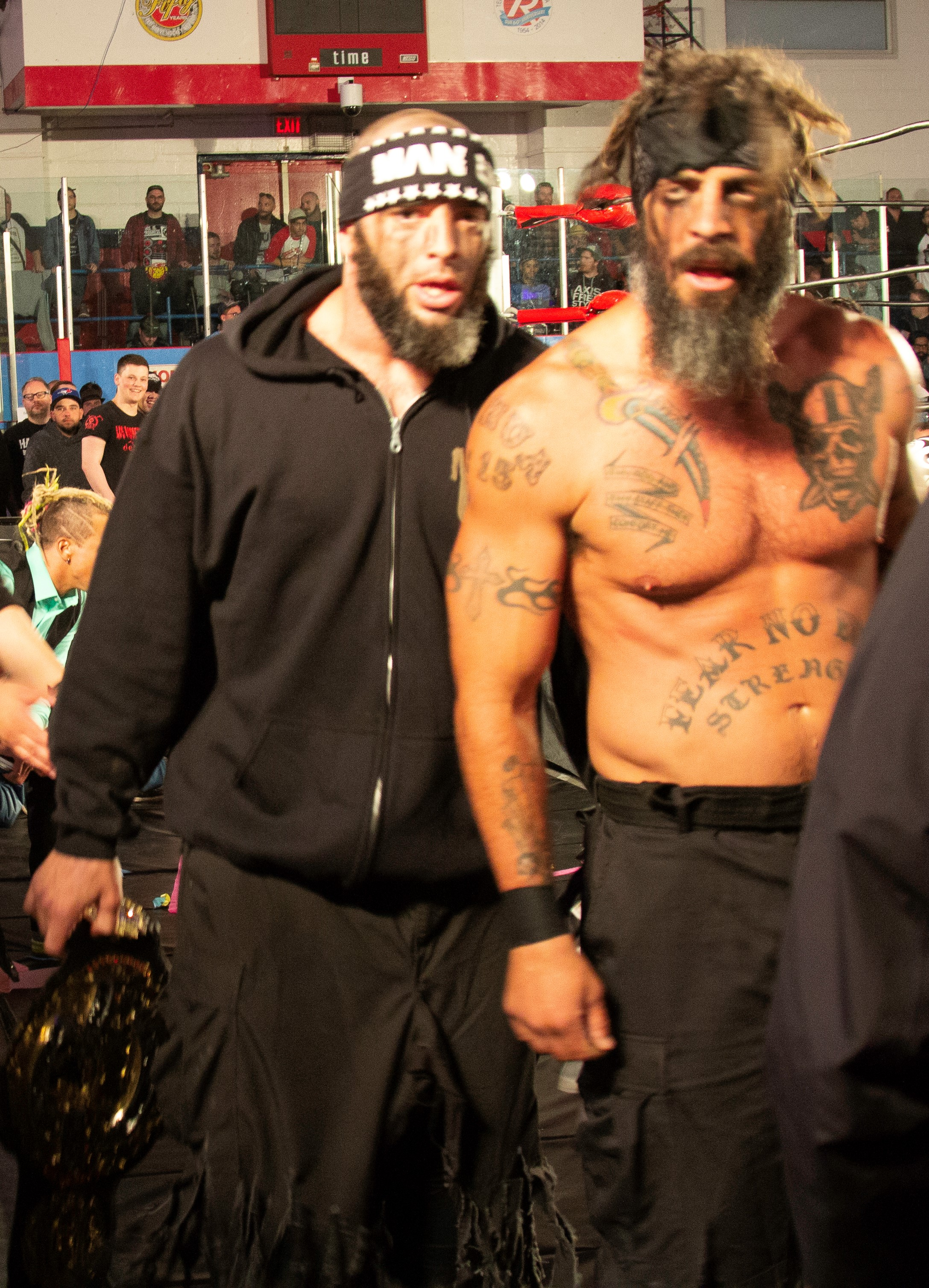
The Briscoes in 2018

At Field of Honor, The Briscoes were in a Tag Team Gauntlet match where they were unsuccessful in winning the ROH World Tag Team Championship. The match included The Addiction (Christopher Daniels and Frankie Kazarian), War Machine (Hanson and Ray Rowe), The All Night Express (Rhett Titus and Kenny King), Chaos (Gedo and Toru Yano), Cheeseburger and Will Ferrara and Leon St. Giovanni and Shaheem Ali. At All Star Extravaganza VIII, The Briscoes teamed with Toru Yano and were defeated by Kushida, A. C. H. and Jay White in the first round of the ROH World Six-Man Tag Team Championship Tournament. At Final Battle, The Briscoes challenged The Young Bucks (Matt Jackson and Nick Jackson) for the ROH World Tag Team Championship, but were unsuccessful. On March 11, 2017, The Briscoes and Bully Ray defeated The Kingdom to win the ROH World Six-Man Tag Team Championship. They lost the title to Dalton Castle and The Boys on June 23 at Best in the World. The Briscoes and Bully Ray challenged for the title again on September 22 at Death Before Dishonor XV, but were defeated by Hangman Page and The Young Bucks, when Jay turned on Ray. On October 20, Mark also turned on Ray, attacking him and Tommy Dreamer with his brother. On December 15, 2017, at Final Battle The Briscoe Brothers won against Bully Ray and Tommy Dreamer in a New York Street Fight.

On March 9, 2018, at ROH 16th Anniversary Show, The Briscoes defeated The Motor City Machine Guns to win the ROH World Tag Team Championship for the ninth time. They lost the titles on October 14, 2018, against So Cal Uncensored (Frankie Kazarian and Scorpio Sky). They won the titles back on December 14, 2018, for the tenth time, but lost them to Villain Enterprises at the ROH 17th Anniversary Show. The Briscoes failed to win the titles and additionally the IWGP Tag Team Championships at G1 Supercard in April, losing to Guerrillas of Destiny in a four-way tag match also involving Villain Enterprises and Los Ingobernables de Japon. At ROH/NJPW War of the Worlds in May, The Briscoes lost to Guerillas of Destiny once more, failing to win the ROH World Tag Team Championships. In July, The Briscoes defeated Guerillas of Destiny in a New York City Street Fight, to win the ROH World Tag Team Championships for the eleventh time. At Death Before Dishonor XVII, The Briscoes retained the titles against LifeBlood (Bandido and Mark Haskins). At Final Battle, the Briscoes lost the titles to Jay Lethal and Jonathan Gresham, ending their eleventh reign at 146 days.

The following year at Gateway to Honor, The Briscoes teamed with Slex, losing to Villain Enterprises. This match would turn out to be the Briscoes and many other ROH talent's last match with the company for the majority of 2020, due to the suspension of all ROH events in response to the COVID-19 pandemic. The Briscoes returned to ROH events in October, with no fans in attendance. In December, The Briscoes competed separately at Final Battle, the only ROH PPV of the year. The following year at Best in the World, The Briscoes defeated Brian Johnson and PJ Black, with events returning to having fans in attendance.

On October 27, 2021, Ring of Honor announced that it would go on a hiatus after Final Battle in December, with a return tentatively scheduled for April 2022. All personnel, including The Briscoes, would also be released from their contracts, but still paid till their contracts expired. It was also announced that champions would be able to defend ROH championships in other promotions. Due to this, The Briscoes worked for many independent companies, such as Game Changer Wrestling and for the National Wrestling Alliance for the remainder of 2021. At Final Battle in December, The Briscoes wrestled their final match for ROH defeating The Kingdom to win the ROH World Tag Team Championships for the twelfth time. After the match, The Briscoes thanked the ROH fans for their support and challenged any team to face them for the titles, but were interrupted by AEW's FTR who attacked the Briscoes.

During the remainder of 2021 and early 2022, The Briscoes successfully defended the ROH World Tag Team Championships at various independent shows. On March 2, 2022, during All Elite Wrestling (AEW)'s live weekly series, AEW Dynamite, owner & executive Tony Khan announced that he had acquired Ring of Honor from the Sinclair Broadcast Group. Following this, ROH returned for the first time since Final Battle at Supercard of Honor XV, where The Briscoes finally faced FTR for the ROH World Tag Team Championships, losing the titles, ending their twelfth reign at 111 days. The Briscoes next appeared in July at Death Before Dishonor, facing FTR for the titles in a two out of three falls match. The match ended with FTR defeating The Briscoes 2-1 after 43 minutes and 26 seconds, retaining the titles in another highly praised match. On December 10, at Final Battle, The Briscoes and FTR faced each other in a third match, which was a Dog Collar match, where The Briscoes finally defeated FTR, winning the ROH World Tag Team Titles for the thirteenth time. Post match, FTR were attacked by Colten and Austin Gunn, who had targeted FTR for weeks on AEW programming, causing The Briscoes to return to the ring to chase off the Gunns. In the ring, The Briscoes and FTR embraced, ending their year-long feud.

=== Independent circuit (2006–2018) ===
The Briscoe Brothers began regularly working for ROH's sister promotion, Full Impact Pro (FIP), in September 2006, after two appearances in May. They won the FIP Tag Team Championship from The Heartbreak Express in their fourth event with the promotion, Southern Justice, after previously winning a number one contenders match over Davey Richards and Colt Cabana. On November 11, at Evening the Odds, the Briscoes were aligned with newly crowned FIP Heavyweight Champion Roderick Strong as members of his team for a five-on-five elimination match, where the three of them were the only survivors. After Necro Butcher beat Mark and Mad Man Pondo fought Jay to a no contest on February 2 at Dangerous Intentions '07, the two of them, known as a team as The Deathmatch Kings, fell in a tag title match the next night at In Full Force '07. Both brothers competed in the FIP Florida Heritage Title Tournament held at the next event, the Eddie Graham Memorial Battle of the Belts, but Mark fell to Delirious in the first round and Jay to Roderick Strong in the semifinals. Their feud with the Deathmatch Kings continued at International Impact weekend, April 20 and April 21, culminating in the Brothers retaining the tag team title in a bar room brawl on night two. The Briscoes further went on in 2007 to retain the title in matches over the likes of Tyler Black & Marek Brave, Black & Trik Davis, and The Irish Airborne. On November 9, at Unstoppable 2007, their year-long title reign ended, when they dropped the belts to Kenny King and Jason Blade.

The Briscoe Brothers toured with ROH Japanese partner Noah in 2007, winning the GHC Junior Heavyweight Tag Team Championship on January 7, 2007, from the team of Takashi Sugiura and Yoshinobu Kanemaru. However, they quickly dropped it two weeks later to Ricky Marvin and Kotaro Suzuki, essentially making them transitional champions. They returned for three shows in July, the first a time limit draw against Kenta and Taiji Ishimori, the second a victory alongside Nigel McGuinness over Takuma Sano, Takashi Sugiura, and Tsutomu Hirayanagi, and the third a loss with McGuinness to Mitsuharu Misawa (Noah's owner), Yoshinari Ogawa, and Ricky Marvin. They have since gone back for further tours.

On December 11, 2010, at Cage of Death XII The Briscoes Returned to CZW challenging newly crowned CZW World Tag Team Champions Philly's Most Wanted of Blk Jeez and Joker to a title match in January. On January 7, 2011, at "From Small Beginnings Come Great Things" Philly's Most Wanted retained the CZW World Tag Team Championships against the Briscoe Brothers in a no contest. The Briscoes then challenged Philly's Most Wanted to a no disqualification rematch. On February 12, 2011, at "Twelve: The Twelfth Anniversary Event" The Briscoe Brothers defeated Philly's Most Wanted to become the new CZW World Tag Team Champions. They lost the title back to Philly's Most Wanted on May 14, 2011. The Briscoes returned to CZW again on November 10, 2012, facing Dave and Jake Crist in a losing effort.

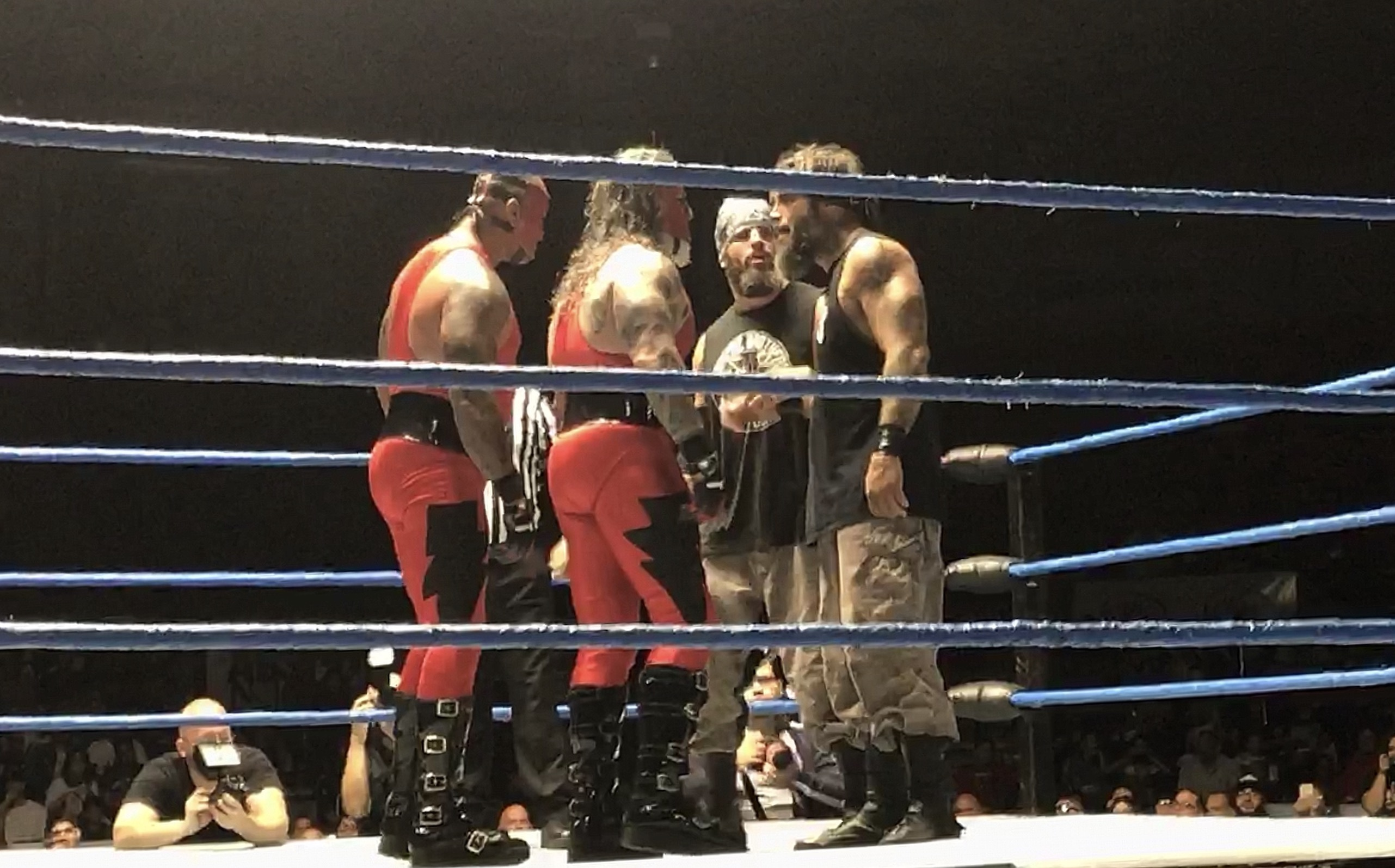
The Briscoes in Puerto Rico (July 2018).

The Briscoes opened a tour of Latin America by participating in the World Wrestling Council's (WWC) in Puerto Rico, eponymous anniversary series. The main night of Aniversario, The Briscoes lost to Thunder and Lightning.

On August 3, 2018, The Briscoes made their debuts for Consejo Mundial de Lucha Libre (CMLL) in Mexico, with Rush were defeated LA Park, Penta el Zero M and Rey Fénix. In the promotion Pura Raza defeated Volador Jr. and Rey Cometa of Consejo Mundial de Lucha Libre On September 5, both participated in the International Gran Prix torneo cibernetico and were eliminated the same day; Jay was defeated by Último Guerrero and Mark lost to Carístico.

=== WWE tryout (2009) ===
On November 24, 2009, the Briscoe Brothers had a tryout for World Wrestling Entertainment at their SmackDown! and ECW tapings. The following month they were invited for a tryout at Florida Championship Wrestling, WWE's developmental territory. As revealed by the Briscoes in a YouTube video promo, they were eventually turned down by WWE as they were not "cosmetically pleasing" to suit WWE's programming. Any future tryouts for the WWE for the brothers were nixed after a series of anti-LGBTQ tweets by Jay from 2011 to 2013.

=== New Japan Pro-Wrestling (2016) ===
The Briscoes made their debuts for New Japan Pro-Wrestling at Wrestle Kingdom 10 in Tokyo Dome, teaming with Toru Yano in a victory over Bullet Club members Bad Luck Fale, Tama Tonga, and Yujiro Takahashi to become the first NEVER Openweight 6-Man Tag Team Champions. Through their affiliation with Yano, the Briscoes also became part of the Chaos stable. The three made their first successful title defense the following day against another Bullet Club trio of Fale, Matt Jackson and Nick Jackson. On February 11 at The New Beginning in Osaka, the Briscoes and Yano lost the NEVER Openweight 6-Man Tag Team Championship to Fale, Tonga and Takahashi in their second defense. The Briscoes and Yano regained the title three days later at The New Beginning in Niigata. On February 20 at Honor Rising: Japan 2016, the Briscoes and Yano lost the title to The Elite (Kenny Omega and The Young Bucks).

The Briscoes returned to NJPW on June 19 at Dominion 6.19 in Osaka-jo Hall, where they defeated Guerrillas of Destiny (Tama Tonga and Tanga Loa) to win the IWGP Tag Team Championship. They made their first successful title defense on August 14 against the Bullet Club team of Hangman Page and Yujiro Takahashi. On September 22 at Destruction in Hiroshima, The Briscoe Brothers defeated reigning IWGP Junior Heavyweight Tag Team Champions The Young Bucks for their second successful title defense. On October 10 at King of Pro-Wrestling, they lost the title back to Tonga and Loa.

=== National Wrestling Alliance (2022) ===
In March 2022, The Briscoes participated in the 2022 Crockett Cup tournament, which they would end up winning after defeating The Commonwealth Connection (Doug Williams and Harry Smith) in the finals.

=== Impact Wrestling (2022) ===
On April 1, 2022, at Multiverse of Matches, The Briscoe Brothers made their Impact Wrestling debut, losing to The Good Brothers (Doc Gallows and Karl Anderson). on the April 28 episode of Impact, The Briscoe Brothers returned and defeated Heath and Rhino.

On May 7, 2022, they defeated Violent By Design (represented by Eric Young and Deaner) at Under Siege to win the Impact World Tag Team Championship for the first time. on the May 19 episode of Impact, The Briscoe Brothers defeated Violent By Design (Deaner and Joe Doering) to retain the titles. On the May 26 episode of Impact, The Briscoe Brothers and Josh Alexander defeated Violent By Design (Deaner, Eric Young and Joe Doering) in a six man tag team match. On the June 16 episode of Impact, The Briscoe Brothers defeated Bullet Club (Jay White and Chris Bey).

At Slammiversary, The Briscoe Brothers lost the titles to The Good Brothers (Doc Gallows and Karl Anderson) ending their reign at 43 days. On the June 23 episode of Impact, The Briscoe Brothers and James Storm lost to Honor No More (Eddie Edwards, Matt Taven and Mike Bennett) in a six man tag team match.

== Championships and accomplishments ==
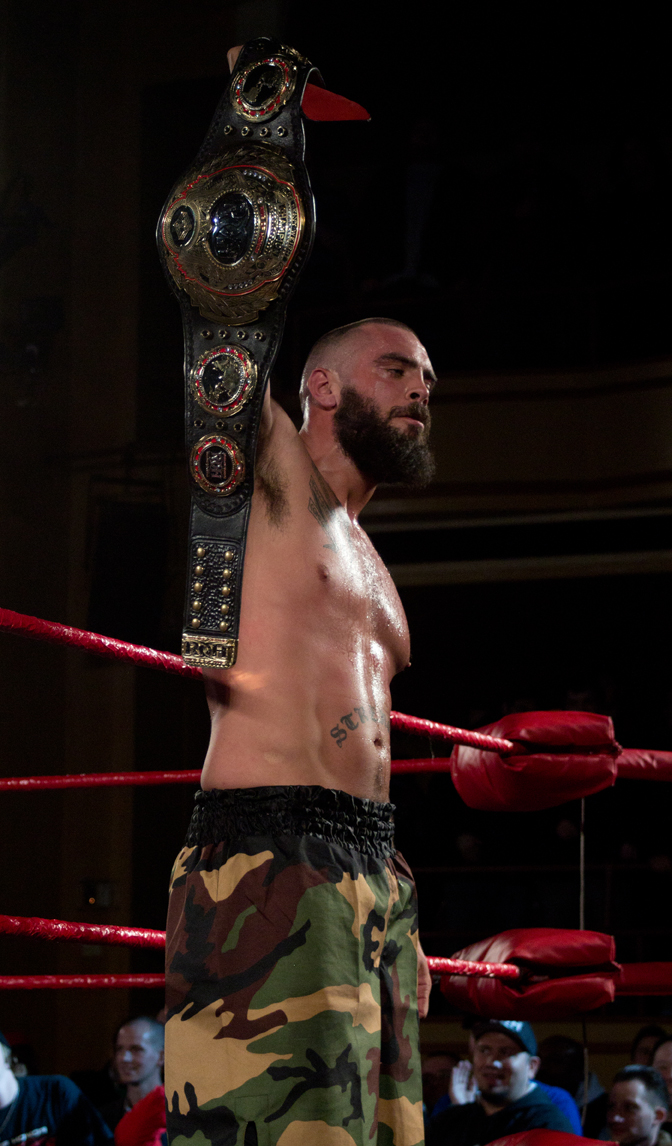
Jay Briscoe was a two-time ROH World Champion, as well as a record 13-time ROH World Tag Team Champion with his brother Mark.

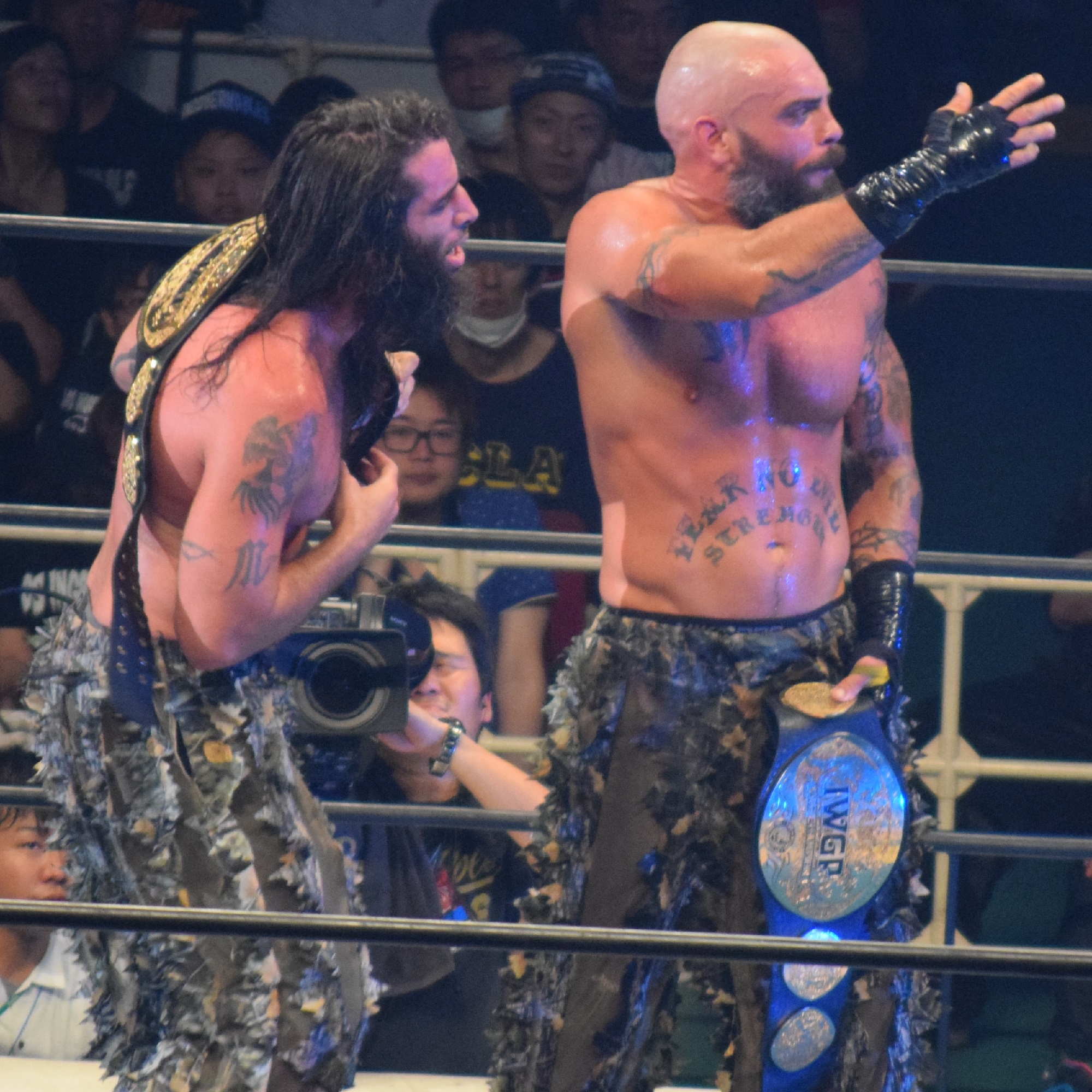
The Briscoe Brothers as the IWGP Tag Team Champions in June 2016.

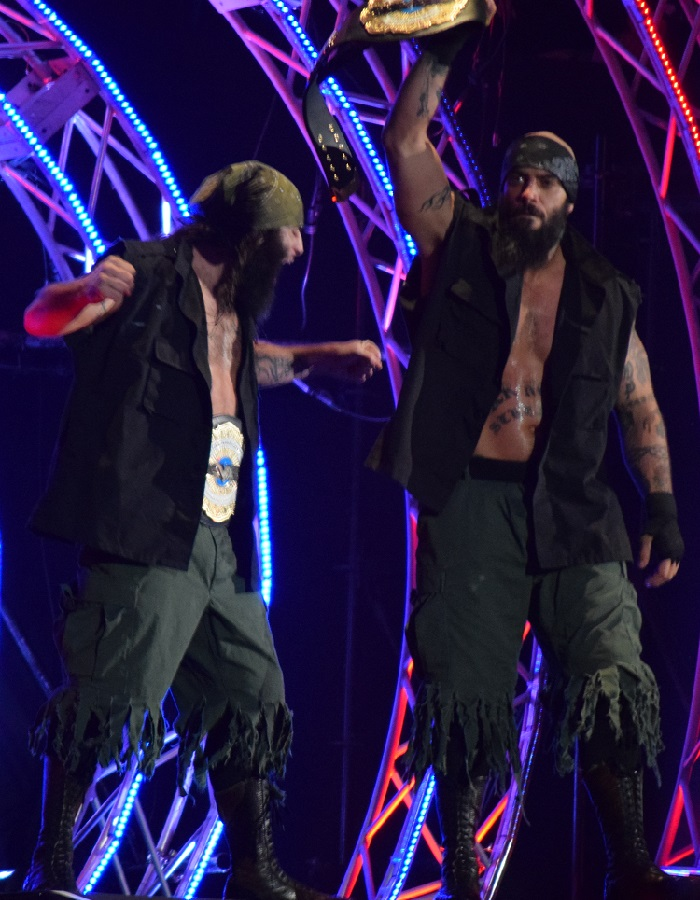
The Briscoes were two-time NEVER Openweight 6-Man Tag Team Champions (with Toru Yano)

- Combat Zone Wrestling
  - CZW World Tag Team Championship (2 times)
- Extreme Rising
  - Match of the Year (2012) vs. The Blk Out vs. Los Dramáticos
  - Extreme Rising Moment of the Year (2012) Debut in a Cage match against Blk Out and Los Fantásticos.
- Full Impact Pro
  - FIP Tag Team Championship (1 time)
- Game Changer Wrestling
  - GCW Tag Team Championship (3 times)
- House of Glory
  - HOG Tag Team Championship (1 time)
- Impact Wrestling
  - Impact World Tag Team Championship (1 time)
- Indie Wrestling Hall of Fame
  - Class of 2024
- Jersey Championship Wrestling
  - JCW Light Heavyweight Championship (1 time) – Mark
- Juggalo Championship Wrestling
  - JCW Tag Team Championship (1 time)
- National Wrestling Alliance
  - Crockett Cup (2022)
- New Japan Pro-Wrestling
  - IWGP Tag Team Championship (1 time)
  - NEVER Openweight 6-Man Tag Team Championship (2 times) – with Toru Yano
- NWA Wildside
  - NWA Wildside Tag Team Championship (1 time)
- Pro Wrestling Illustrated
  - Ranked Jay #7 of the top 500 singles wrestlers in the PWI 500 in 2015
  - Ranked Mark #49 of the top 500 singles wrestlers in the PWI 500 in 2013
  - Ranked #3 of the top 50 Tag Teams in the PWI Tag Team 50 in 2022
- Pro Wrestling Noah
  - GHC Junior Heavyweight Tag Team Championship (1 time)
- Pro Wrestling Unplugged
  - PWU Tag Team Championship (1 time)
- Real Championship Wrestling
  - RCW Tag Team Championship (1 time)
  - RCW Tag Team Championship Tournament (2009)
- Ring of Honor
  - ROH World Championship (3 times) – Jay Briscoe (2 times), Mark Briscoe (1 time)
  - ROH World Six-Man Tag Team Championship (1 time) – with Bully Ray
  - ROH World Tag Team Championship (13 times)
  - Honor Rumble (2009, 2013) (Note: ^{1}The Briscoe Brothers were the co-winners of the 2009 Honor Rumble due to it using a tag team-oriented format rather than a singles wrestler-oriented format. Mark won the 2013 Honor Rumble.)
  - ROH Year-End Award (3 times)
    - Tag Team of the Year (2019)
    - Tag Team of the Decade (2010s)
    - Tag Team of the Year (2021)
  - ROH Hall of Fame (class of 2022)
- Squared Circle Wrestling
  - 2CW Tag Team Championship (1 time)
- USA Xtreme Wrestling
  - UXW Tag Team Championship (1 time)
- Wrestling Observer Newsletter
  - Tag Team of the Year (2007)
  - Feud of the Year (2022) vs. FTR
  - Shad Gaspard/Jon Huber Memorial Award (2023) as the part of the Pugh family
