= Danhausen =

American professional wrestler (born 1990)

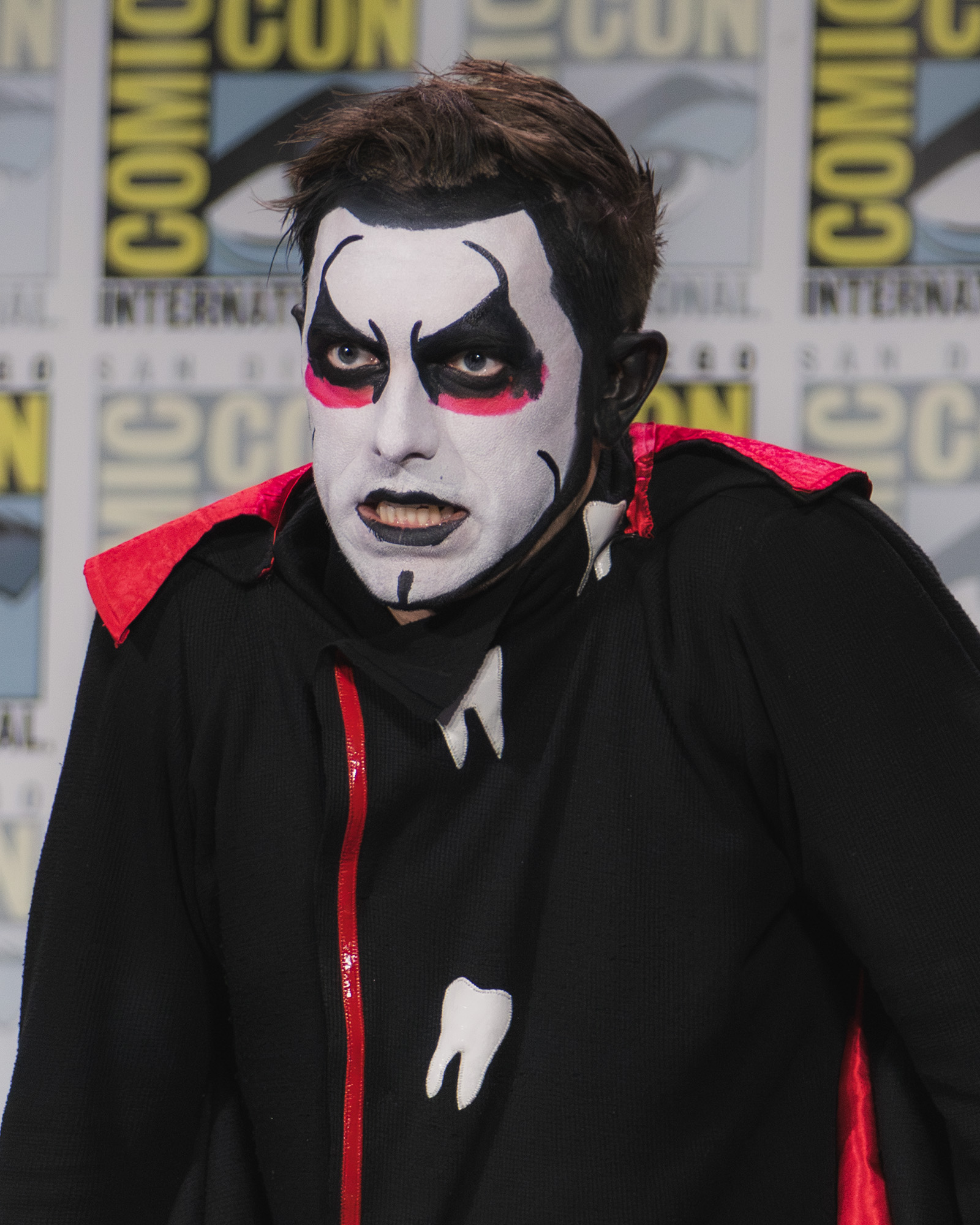
- Danhausen in 2026

Personal information
- Born: Donovan Andrew Danhausen; August 17, 1990 (age 36) Detroit, Michigan, U.S.
- Spouse: Lauren Jiles (m. 2018)
- Children: 2

Professional wrestling career
- Ring name(s): Danhausen; Kid Gorgeous; Dan Danhausen; Steve Austinhausen
- Billed height: 6 ft 7 in (201 cm) (Note: Out of kayfabe, Danhausen is 5 ft 10 in (178 cm) and approximately 175 lb (79 kg).)
- Billed weight: 300 lb (136 kg)
- Billed from: "Someplace far away" "1311 Mockingbird Lane"
- Trained by: Jimmy Jacobs; Truth Martini
- Debut: October 18, 2013

Donovan Andrew Danhausen (born August 17, 1990), better known mononymously as Danhausen, is an American professional wrestler. As of February 2026, he is signed to WWE. He is also known for his tenures in All Elite Wrestling (AEW) and Ring of Honor (ROH), as well as his appearances on the independent circuit.

== Early life ==
Donovan Danhausen was born in Detroit, Michigan on August 17, 1990. He has one sister. He attended university for two semesters before dropping out because he felt it was not the right path for him. He later worked at a movie theater, where he met his friends Davis and Nick, who have since appeared on his YouTube vlog. Danhausen also worked as a nursing assistant while taking wrestling bookings before eventually transitioning to professional wrestling full-time.

== Professional wrestling career ==
=== Early career (2013–2019) ===
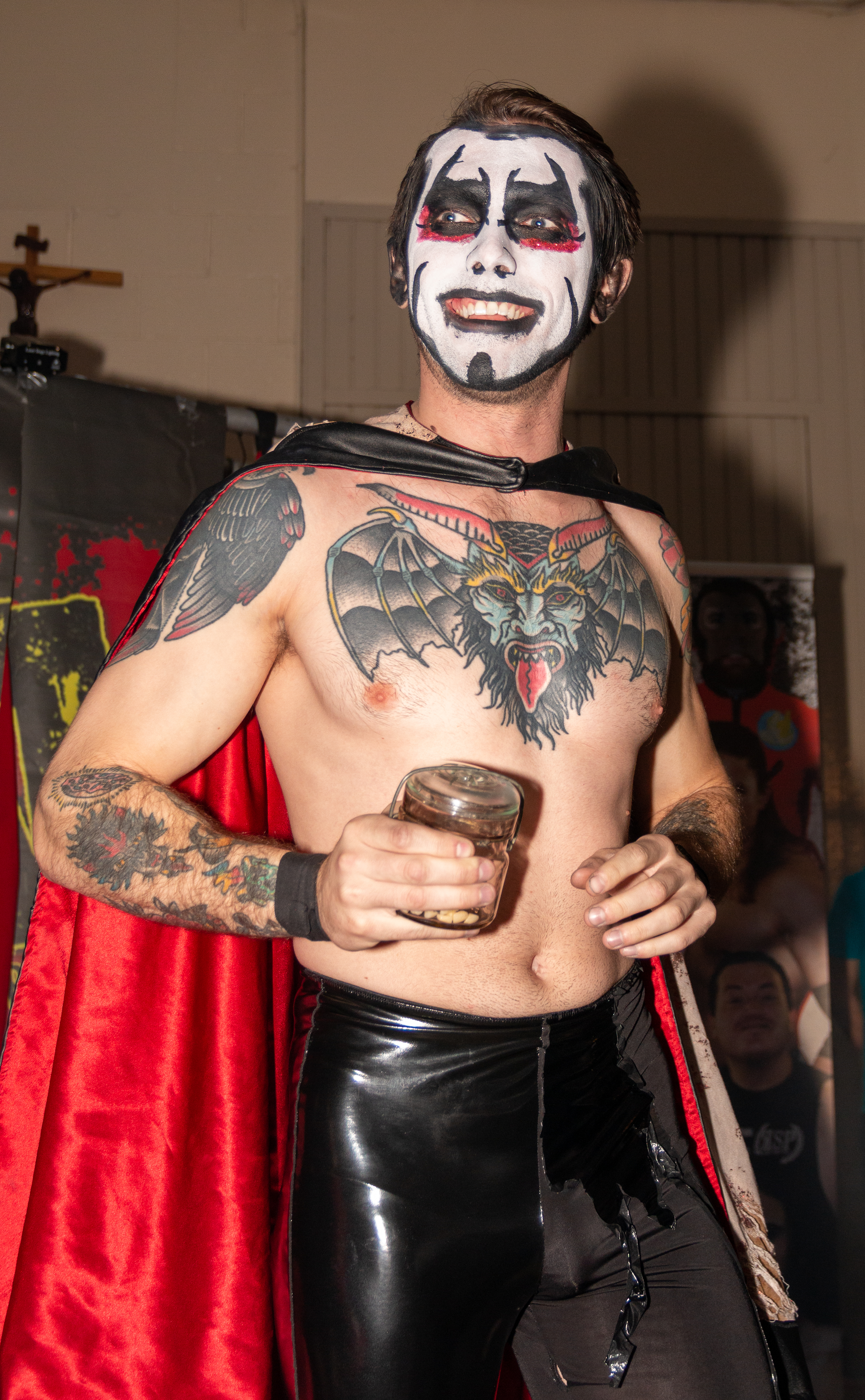
Danhausen in 2019

Danhausen was trained by Jimmy Jacobs and Truth Martini. He made his debut on October 18, 2013, becoming known for sticking to a gimmick illustrated by his spooky attire and painted face. He competed at BLP Slamilton 2, an event produced by Black Label Pro Wrestling, where he teamed up with Ethan Page and Swoggle to defeat Blood Diamond (Jake Lander, Joshua Bishop and Tre Lamar) for the BLP Tag Team Championship. He competed for Capital City Championship Combat at C4 Combat Shock - 12th Anniversary on November 21, 2019, where he defeated Tony Deppen.

=== Ring of Honor (2019–2021) ===
Danhausen made his first appearance for Ring Of Honor at ROH Wrestling #429 on November 2, 2019, where he unsuccessfully challenged Shane Taylor for the ROH World Television Championship. He continued to make sporadic appearances such as at ROH Wrestling #437 where he fell short to Rhett Titus on January 11, 2020, and at ROH Honor Reigns Supreme 2020 on January 12, where he scored a defeat against Dak Draper. At ROH Free Enterprise on February 9, 2020, Danhausen participated in a 20-man battle royal to determine the no.1 contendership for the ROH World Championship, where he competed against the winner Flip Gordon, Gangrel, PJ Black, Tracy Williams and others. At ROH Final Battle 2020 on December 18, he defeated Brian Johnson by disqualification, earning him an ROH contract. Behind the scenes, Danhausen credits Alex Shelley with convincing ROH to sign him. At ROH 19th Anniversary Show on March 26, 2021, Danhausen competed in a four-way match, falling short to the winner, Brian Johnson, Eli Isom and LSG.

=== All Elite Wrestling / Return to ROH (2022–2026) ===
Danhausen made his All Elite Wrestling (AEW) debut during a special episode of Dynamite called Beach Break on January 26, 2022. He appeared during the Lights Out match between Orange Cassidy and Adam Cole. Hours later, AEW President Tony Khan announced that Danhausen had signed with the company. He began having interactions with Hook. On the May 11, 2022, episode of Dynamite, Danhausen wrestled in his first ever AEW match, losing to Tony Nese following a distraction from Mark Sterling. After the match, Hook would align with Danhausen after saving him from a beatdown from Nese and Sterling. The new tag team would make their debut on May 29 at the Double or Nothing Buy-In, defeating Nese and Sterling, after which Danhausen allied himself with Orange Cassidy and the Best Friends.

Danhausen was off AEW and ROH TV for all of 2024, but returned at ROH Final Battle at the Hammerstein Ballroom in what would be his final appearance in AEW/ROH. In August 2025, Danhausen requested his release from AEW, but the company extended his contract into early 2026 to cover the time he missed due to a torn pectoral muscle in 2023. On February 28, 2026, Danhausen's profile was removed from AEW's official roster page, signaling his departure from the promotion.

=== WWE (2026–present) ===
When Danhausen went to WWE, he became one of the top sellers in the company. Pictured with WWE Champion Cody Rhodes.

In February 2026 during episodes of WWE's Raw and SmackDown television programs, a large wooden crate appeared with instructions printed on it stating the crate must not to be opened until February 28, 2026, the date of Elimination Chamber. At the pay-per-view, the crate was opened with Danhausen emerging from a coffin inside. Over the next several weeks, Danhausen appeared on Raw and SmackDown television shows. Despite an initial negative reception during his debut, he quickly grew in popularity and became a top merch seller in WWE in the following weeks, including being one of the top sellers at WrestleMania 42. Danhausen made his WWE in-ring debut on the April 10 episode of SmackDown, defeating Kit Wilson. He made his first WrestleMania appearance on the second night of WrestleMania 42 on April 19, in a segment with Wilson, The Miz, and the host of the event John Cena. At Backlash on May 9, Danhausen teamed with Minihausen to defeat Wilson and The Miz.

Danhausen would then enter a feud with The Judgment Day after they tried to pay him $100,000 to curse Oba Femi. Danhausen would refuse to curse Femi, but kept the money. This would lead to a match at Saturday Night's Main Event on July 18, where Danhausen defeated JD McDonagh in a No Disqualification match after assistance from Karl-Anthony Towns. At Night 2 of SummerSlam on August 2, Danhausen would defeat Dominik Mysterio in a "Human Monies" on a Pole match to keep the money.

== Professional wrestling style and persona ==
Danhausen performing his finisher on The Miz. Before the kick, he taunts the fans while they say "You are cursed".

The character of Danhausen is an eccentric, theatrical professional wrestling persona defined by humor, absurdity, and self-aware performance rather than athletic prowess. The New York Times has described Danhausen as "a ghoul, maybe, or some kind of gremlin" who "wears makeup that looks as if he's in a silent film about KISS". Danhausen has described his character as "Conan O'Brien possessed by a demon", which led Danhausen in April 2021 to appear as a guest on O'Brien's podcast Conan O'Brien Needs a Friend to explain the character. The character wears horror-themed face paint and believes he has supernatural powers, such as shooting lightning from his fingers and the ability to put curses on his enemies. Initially, the "curses" seem not to work, but inevitably, in camp fashion, some terrible, improbable mishap occurs to his opponents. The voice for his character is based on O'Brien and Mark Hamill's Joker. He often refers to himself in the third person, adds the suffix "-hausen" to words, is interested and motivated by money and power, chastises other wrestlers if they use profanity, and describes himself and things he likes as "very nice, very evil". He is also known for nonchalantly dancing a "Pee-wee Herman dance" to the song "Tequila" in the middle of matches. His movements are deliberately awkward and exaggerated, and he engages audiences through pop-culture references and showmanship. Physically unimposing at 5-foot-10 and 175 pounds, his persona contrasts this with exaggerated claims of size and power, his most notable claims being that he stood at 6-foot-7 and weighed "over 300 pounds".

Danhausen's facepaint was inspired by Pazuzu of The Exorcist. He became the first wrestler to trademark his facepaint design before Sting did.

== Other ventures ==
=== Coffee collaboration ===
In collaboration with the Rootless Coffee Company, Danhausen launched a signature coffee blend called Danhausen Coffeehausen in 2021. Like many wrestlers, Danhausen has trademarked his ring name and catchphrases ("Love that Danhausen" and “Very Nice Very Evil.” In addition, he has trademarked the design of his face paint. The attorney who represented him in this matter, Michael Dockins (who works in conjunction with wrestlers so often he is nicknamed the "Gimmick Attorney"), believes this is one of the first times a wrestler has trademarked his physical appearance.

=== Crossover with basketball ===
From April to June 2026, Danhausen expressed a strong passion for basketball, initially he "cursed" the New York Knicks then he "uncursed" the Knicks to allow the Knicks to win their first NBA championship title after a 53-year wait. During the July 18, 2026 Saturday Night's Main Event show at the Knicks' home arena of Madison Square Garden, Knicks center Karl-Anthony Towns was physically involved in Danhausen's no-disqualification match against JD McDonagh. Towns chokeslammed both McDonagh and Dominik Mysterio, sending the latter through a table.

== Personal life ==
Danhausen married Canadian burlesque dancer Lauren Jiles, known professionally as Lou Lou la Duchesse de Rière, in 2018. He is the stepfather of her daughter. In July 2025, Jiles gave birth to their son. He is a fan of horror films, comic books, and cartoons. He is particularly fond of The Simpsons and has tattoos inspired by the show. He is close friends with fellow professional wrestlers Ethan Page, CM Punk, and Brody King. He is represented by Bryan Diperstein of Adventure Media, who also represents other wrestlers such as Seth Rollins, Becky Lynch, and Oba Femi among others.

== Championships and accomplishments ==
- All Elite Wrestling
  - Casino Tag Team Battle Royale (2023) – with Orange Cassidy
- Black Label Pro
  - BLP Tag Team Championship (1 time) – with Ethan Page and Swoggle
- Full Impact Pro
  - FIP Florida Heritage Championship (1 time)
- Figure Wrestling Federation
  - FWF Tag Team Championship (1 time) – with Bobby Orlando
- Insane Wrestling Revolution
  - IWR Tag Team Championship (1 time) – with PCO
- Metro Wrestling Alliance
  - MWA Michigan Championship (1 time)
- Pro Wrestling Illustrated
  - Ranked No. 69 of the top 500 singles wrestlers in the PWI 500 in 2026
- Ring of Honor
  - ROH Year-End Award (1 time)
    - Best New Star (2020)
- Slammasters Wrestling
  - SMW Championship (1 time)

== Luchas de Apuestas record ==
Winner (wager)	Loser (wager)	Location	Event	Date	Notes
Microman (mask)	Danhausen (mask)	Dallas, Texas	GCW Crime Wave 2024	June 9, 2024	
