= FIP Florida Heritage Championship =

Professional wrestling championship

Details
- Promotion: Full Impact Pro
- Date established: March 10, 2007
- Current champion: Sage Scott
- Date won: December 14, 2025
Statistics
- First champion: Erick Stevens
- Most reigns: Jon Davis (2 reigns)
- Longest reign: Jon Davis (1092 days)
- Shortest reign: Donovan Danhausen (1 day)
- Oldest champion: Sideshow (45 years, 548 days)
- Youngest champion: Chris Jones (19 years)
- Heaviest champion: Erick Stevens (235 lb (107 kg))
- Lightest champion: Chasyn Rance (163 lb (74 kg))

The Full Impact Pro (FIP) Florida Championship is a professional wrestling championship created and promoted by the American independent professional wrestling promotion Full Impact Pro.

== History ==
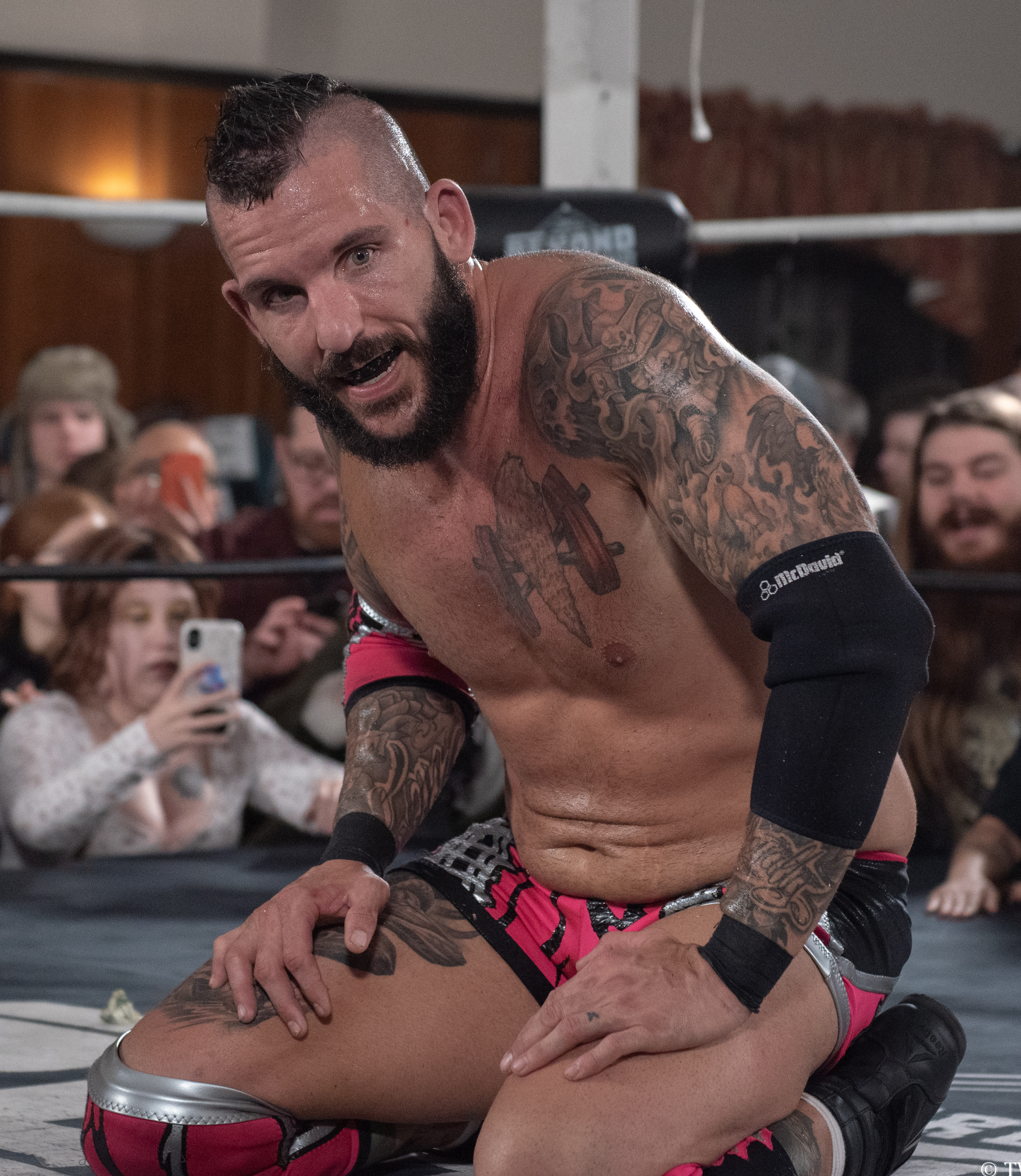
Inaugural champion Erick Stevens.

The first FIP Florida Heritage Champion was crowned on March 10, 2007, when Erick Stevens defeated Roderick Strong in the finals of a one night tournament in Crystal River, Florida, at the Eddie Graham Memorial Battle for the Belts.

=== Eddie Graham Memorial Battle Of The Belts (2007) ===
First Round
Roderick Strong	Pin
Jimmy Rave	9:02
Larry Sweeney	10:11
Jay Briscoe	Pin
Delirious	Pin
Mark Briscoe	3:51
SHINGO	9:12
Erick Stevens	Pin

Semifinals
Roderick Strong	Pin
Jay Briscoe	13:25
Delirious	15:12
Erick Stevens	Pin

Finals
Roderick Strong	21:16
Erick Stevens	Pin

== Reigns ==
As of 12 February 2026, there have been 22 reigns among 21 different champions and two vacancies. Erick Stevens was the inaugural champion. Jon Davis holds three records with the title: he record for most reigns at two, his second reign is the longest reign at 1,092 days, and he is the only wrestler to have held the title for a consecutive two years. Danhausen's second reign of 1 day is the shortest in the title's history. Davis also has the longest combined reign at 1469 days. Gran Akuma is the oldest champion when he won it at 38 years old while Chris Jones is the youngest champion at 19 years old.

Sage Scott is the current champion in his first reign. He defeated Rich Port Ayala in a Ecstasy Of Gold match at WWN Supershow: Battle Of The Belts on December 14, 2025, in Clearwater, Florida.

Key
No.	Overall reign number
Reign	Reign number for the specific champion
Days	Number of days held
+	Current reign is changing daily

No.	Champion	Championship change			Reign statistics		Notes	Ref.
No.	Champion	Date	Event	Location	Reign	Days	Notes	Ref.
World Wrestling Network (WWNLive): Full Impact Pro (FIP) and Independent circuit
1	Erick Stevens	March 10, 2007	Eddie Graham Memorial Battle of the Belts	Crystal River, FL	1	244	Stevens defeated Roderick Strong in a Eddie Graham Memorial Battle Of The Belts tournament final to become the inaugural champion.	
2	Sal Rinauro	November 9, 2007	Unstoppable	Crystal River, FL	1	337		
3	Chris Jones	October 11, 2008	Fallout	Crystal River, FL	1	168		
4	Rhett Titus	March 28, 2009	FIP	Crystal River, FL	1	189		
5	Brad Allen	October 3, 2009	Fallout	Crystal River, FL	1	301		
6	Jake Manning	July 31, 2010	Cage of Pain III	Crystal River, FL	1	455		
7	Uhaa Nation	October 29, 2011	Jeff Peterson Memorial Cup	Crystal River, FL	1	650		
8	Gran Akuma	August 9, 2013	Headstroke	Tampa, FL	1	217		
9	Lince Dorado	March 14, 2014	Everything Burns	Tampa, FL	1	72		
10	Chasyn Rance	May 25, 2014	BELIEVE 70 Florida J Cup	Orlando, FL	1	343	Rance defeated Lince Dorado in the finals of the 2014 Florida J Cup. The match was also for Rance's SCW Florida Cruiserweight Championship.	
11	Maxwell Chicago	February 20, 2015	Ascension	Tampa, FL	1	437	This was a Title vs. Tux match.	
—	Vacated	May 2, 2016	—	—	—	—	The championship was vacated after Maxwell Chicago announced his retirement.	
12	Donovan Danhausen	May 27, 2016	Accelerate	Orlando, FL	1	1	This was a four-way match, also involving Aaron Solo, Lince Dorado and Martin Stone for the vacant championship.	
13	Martin Stone	May 28, 2016	ACW Tradition Continues	New Port Richey, FL	1	309		
14	Jon Davis	April 2, 2017	Broken Tailgate Party	New Port Richey, FL	1	377		
15	Eddie Taurus	April 14, 2018	ACW Proving Ground Supershow!	New Port Richey, FL	1	41		
16	Jon Davis	May 25, 2018	Ascension	Ybor City, FL	2	1,092		
—	Vacated	May 21, 2021	—	—	—	—	The championship was vacated.	
17	Troy Hollywood	May 22, 2021	Everything Burns	Ybor City, FL	1	176	Defeated Snoop Strikes in a tournament final to win the vacant title.	
18	Anthony Greene	November 14, 2021	WWN Supershow: Battle Of The Belts	Crystal River, FL	1	336		
19	Sideshow	October 16, 2022	Fallout 2022	Clearwater, FL	1	819		
20	Steven Frick	January 12, 2025	Everything Burns 2025	Clearwater, FL	1	182		
21	Rich Port Ayala	July 13, 2025	FIP Heatstroke 2025	Clearwater, FL	1	154		
22	Sage Scott	December 14, 2025	WWN Supershow: Battle Of The Belts	Clearwater, FL	1	329+		

== Combined reigns ==
As of 8 November 2026

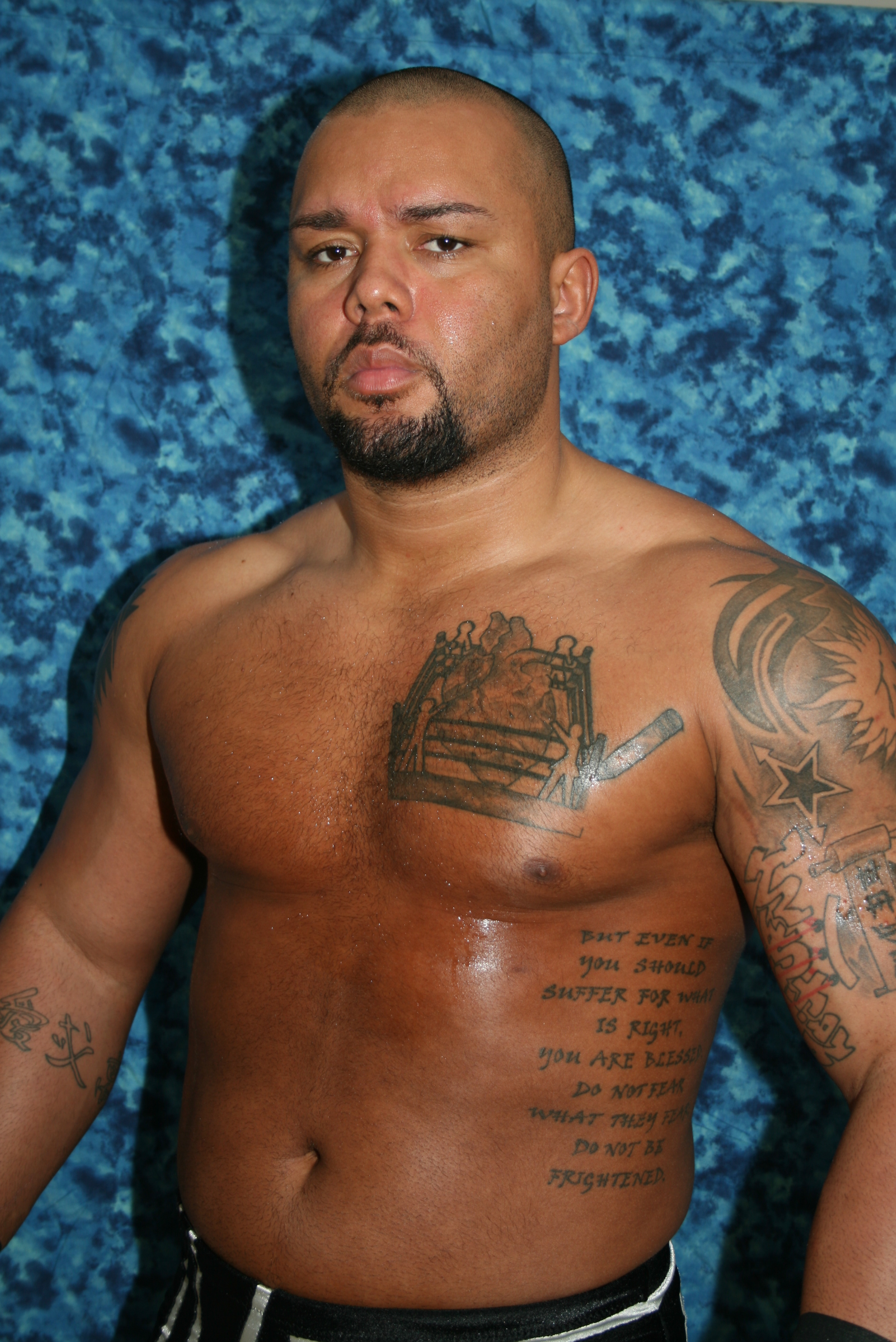
Record-setting two-time champion Jon Davis; he has the longest singular reign for the title at 1092 days, and he also has the longest combined reign at 1469 days

†	Indicates the current champion(s)

Rank	Wrestler	No. of reigns	Combined days
1	Jon Davis	2	1,469
2	Sideshow	1	819
3	Uhaa Nation	1	650
4	Jake Manning	1	455
5	Maxwell Chicago	1	437
6	Sal Rinauro	1	337
7	Anthony Greene	1	336
8	Sage Scott †	1	329+
9	Martin Stone	1	309
10	Brad Allen	1	301
11	Chasyn Rance	1	271
12	Erick Stevens	1	244
13	Gran Akuma	1	217
14	Rhett Titus	1	189
15	Steven Frick	1	182
16	Troy Hollywood	1	176
17	Chris Jones	1	168
18	Rich Port Ayala	1	154
19	Lince Dorado	1	72
20	Eddie Taurus	1	41
21	Donovan Danhausen	1	1
