= Erick Stevens =

American retired professional wrestler (born 1982)

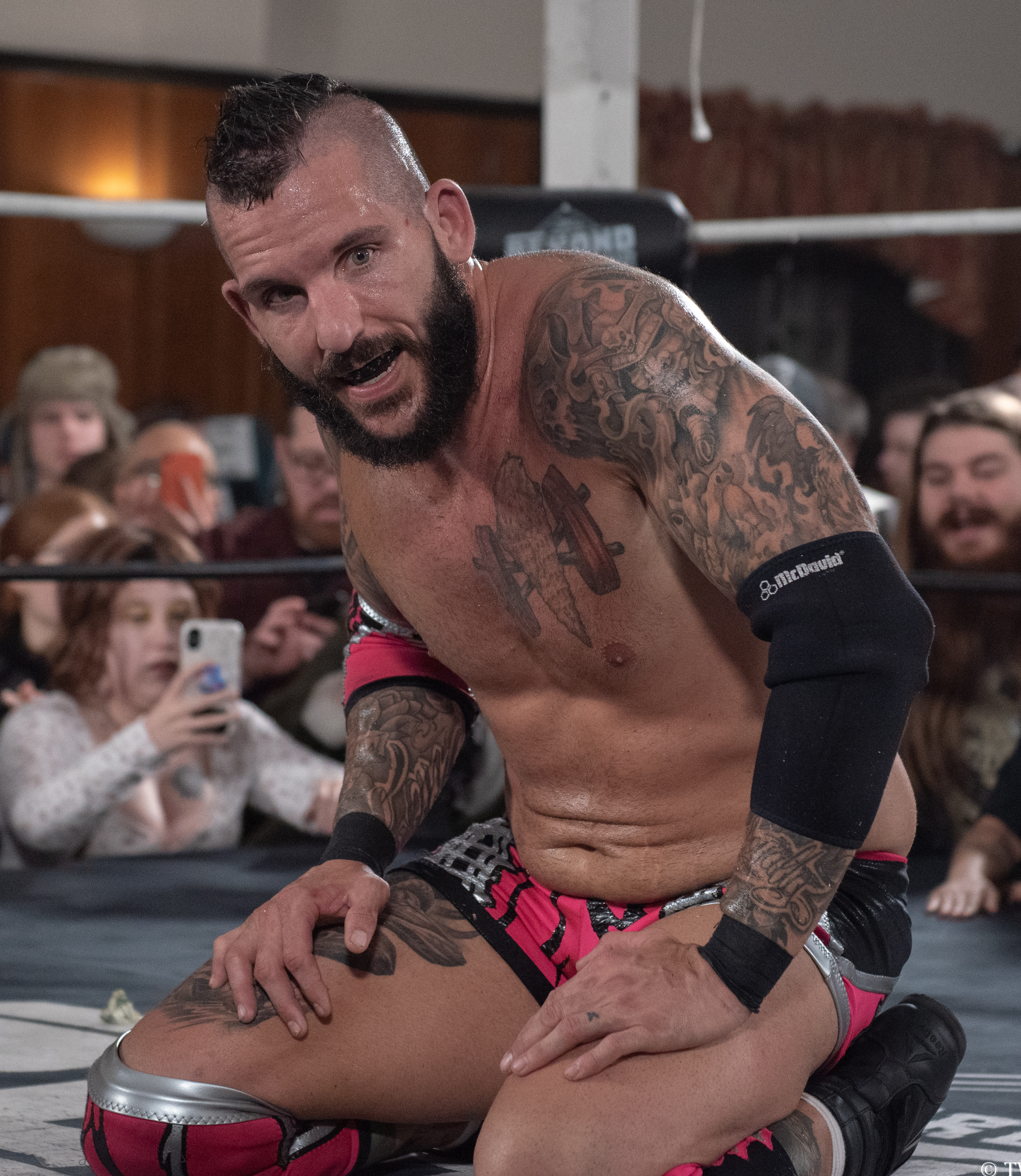
- Stevens in December 2019

Personal information
- Born: Eric Koenreich; March 12, 1982 (age 44) Sarasota, Florida, U.S.

Professional wrestling career
- Ring name: Erick Stevens
- Billed height: 6 ft 0 in (1.83 m)
- Billed weight: 248 lb (112 kg); 250 lb (113 kg)
- Billed from: Sarasota, Florida
- Trained by: Roderick Strong
- Debut: 2003

Eric Koenreich (born March 12, 1982), better known by his ring name Erick Stevens, is an American professional wrestler. He currently performs on the independent circuit.

== Career ==
=== NWA Florida (2003–2004) ===
Stevens debuted in May 2003 after completing his training with Roderick Strong. He began working for the now defunct NWA Florida promotion and eventually won the 2005 Rage in the Cage, an annual cage match battle royal that rewarded the winner with a heavyweight championship shot. Before Stevens could capitalize and challenge then champion Bruce Santee for the belt, however, the promotion folded. Shortly after Stevens was involved in rivalries with both Sedrick Strong and Vordell Walker.

=== Full Impact Pro (2005–2009) ===
In 2005 Stevens debuted for Full Impact Pro as Steve Madison's tag partner as The Miracle Violence Connection 2005/2006. After feuding with The Fast and The Furious (Jerrelle Clark and Jay Fury), the Miracle Violence Connection 2006 took on Sal Rinauro and Colt Cabana in a series of matches that culminated in a loss during a Crystal River Street Fight in May 2006. After losing the match, Madison turned on Stevens, giving him a piledriver. Stevens and Madison, along with his YRR stable, feuded for the better part of 2006 and capped their bitter rivalry off with a Dog Collar Match in Crystal River, where Stevens was victorious.

On March 10, 2007 during the Eddie Graham Memorial Battle for the Belts, Stevens defeated Shingo, Delirious, and Roderick Strong on his way to becoming the first FIP Florida Heritage Champion. Stevens claimed his entire purpose for winning and defending the belt was to bring back the prestige Florida had lost since its Golden Age. After becoming champion he defended it against the likes of Nigel McGuinness, Claudio Castagnoli, and Delirious. After months of successful defenses, Sal Rinauro became the new champion after hitting Stevens with his own belt.

At ROH's Final Battle 2007, Stevens defeated Roderick Strong to win the FIP World Heavyweight Championship. Stevens would make successful defenses of the title in ROH against the likes Austin Aries and Bryan Danielson before losing it back to Strong at FIP's Redefined. Stevens then came up short in a rematch for the title at "Dangerous Intentions 2008" on April 26, 2008, in a Last Man Standing match. Three months later, on July 19, Stevens regained the FIP World Heavyweight Championship from Strong in a Dog Collar match.

Stevens was defeated for the FIP World Heavyweight Championship by Go Shiozaki at FIP's Heatstroke 2008 on August 23, 2008.

On December 20, 2008, Stevens teamed with former rival Roderick Strong to defeat Kenny King and Jason Blade of The YRR to win the FIP Tag Team Championship, making Stevens the first triple crown champion in FIP. On October 3, 2009, Strong turned on Stevens in a match where they lost the Tag Team Championship to Chris Gray and Tommy Taylor of The British Lions.

=== Ring of Honor and retirement (2007–2010) ===
On March 31, 2007 Stevens made his debut for Ring of Honor (ROH) in Detroit, Michigan at All Star Extravaganza III. Shortly after this, he was contacted by Austin Aries to join The Resilience. Doing so, Stevens aligned himself against Roderick Strong and his No Remorse Corps (NRC). The NRC and The Resilience were currently engulfed in a heated feud, until Aries disbanded The Resilience at Glory By Honor VI Night 2, which left Stevens' position in ROH uncertain. Stevens returned to Ring of Honor on November 30 in Dayton and December 1 in Chicago. Stevens made a giant impact in ROH as he defeated Roderick Strong for the FIP World Championship ending Roderick's 13-month reign. Stevens occasionally teamed with The Briscoe Brothers against the NRC and The Age of the Fall.

On June 6, 2008, Stevens defeated Necro Butcher and Brent Albright in a three-way dance. The following night, however, he lost the final match in his feud with Strong when Strong defeated him in a Fight Without Honor.

On July 25, 2008, Stevens fought Go Shiozaki to a 15-minute time-limit draw. Shiozaki's manager, Larry Sweeney, refused to allow the match to continue for an additional five minutes, which resulted in a brawl between Stevens and Sweeney's faction, Sweet N' Sour Incorporated. On July 26, 2008, he won a Four Corners Survival Match after defeating Shane Hagadorn, Delirious and Ruckus when he pinned Delirious.

On November 6, 2009, Stevens turned heel and joined Prince Nana's Embassy stable. ROH stopped using Stevens in the Fall of 2010 and he retired from professional wrestling soon after. He's now a strength coach who primarily works with women and owns his own powerlifting gym in Sarasota, FL.

=== Return to wrestling (2019–present) ===
On May 19, 2019 Stevens returned to pro-wrestling having his comeback match for Beyond Wrestling in a losing effort against Chris Dickinson. Stevens later began competing for smaller indies such as IPW. On December 20, 2019 it was announced that Stevens would be debuting for MLW on January 11 at their Zero Hour event. Stevens was victorious in his debut match against Douglas James. Later that night he joined Tom Lawlor's Team Filthy stable and assisted in an attack on the Von Erichs. On March 17, 2020 Erick Stevens announced on Twitter that he was once again retiring. Stevens planned to retire from wrestling in April, but due to the COVID pandemic, he delayed his retirement to October 12, 2020.

== Personal life ==
Stevens operates a YouTube channel and Instagram account with his family, where he is known as the Family Food Dude. As of September 2020, Stevens has 17,000 YouTube subscribers and 100,000 Instagram followers.

== Championships and accomplishments ==
- Alliance Wrestling Force
  - AWF Florida Championship (1 time)
  - AWF Universal Championship (1 time)
  - Yapro Cup (2009)
- Black Label Pro
  - BLP Heavyweight Championship (1 time)
- Freelance Wrestling
  - Jeff Peterson Memorial Cup (2008)
- Full Impact Pro
  - Eddie Graham Memorial Battle of the Belts (2007)
  - FIP Florida Heritage Championship (1 time)
  - FIP World Tag Team Championship (1 time) – with Roderick Strong
  - FIP World Heavyweight Championship (2 times)
  - First Triple Crown Champion
- IndependentWrestling.tv
  - IWTV Independent Wrestling Championship (1 time)
- No Name Wrestling
  - NNW Overall Championship (1 time)
- Pro Wrestling Illustrated
  - PWI ranked him #128 of the top 500 singles wrestlers in the PWI 500 in 2010
- Wrestling Observer Newsletter
  - Rookie of the Year (2007)
