= Sal Rinauro =

American professional wrestler (born 1982)

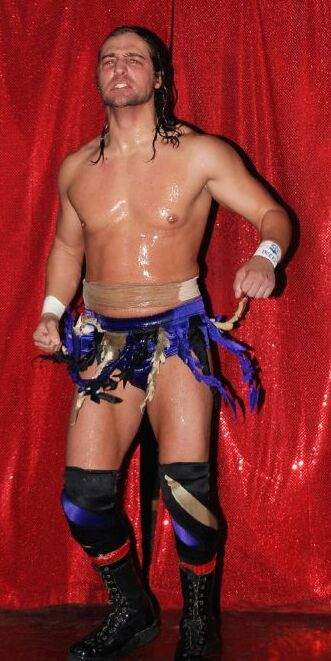
- Rinauro in 2007

Personal information
- Born: Salvatore Rinauro; September 12, 1982 (age 43) Los Angeles, California, U.S.

Professional wrestling career
- Ring name(s): El Chico Loco; Kid Xtasy; Mellow; Sal Del Rio; Sal Rinauro; Sal the Pizza Boy; Sal Vation
- Billed height: 5 ft 9 in (175 cm)
- Billed weight: 185 lb (84 kg)
- Billed from: Los Angeles, California
- Trained by: John Phoenix
- Debut: 2000

Salvatore Rinauro (born September 12, 1982) is an American professional wrestler, He is performing for the National Wrestling Alliance (NWA). He is best known for his work in Ring of Honor (ROH) and Full Impact Pro (FIP). in addition to being a member of The Embassy. He also makes appearances on the independent circuit.

== Professional wrestling career ==
=== Ring of Honor (2005–2006) ===
After honing his skills at NWA Wildside as well as winning the promotion's Junior Heavyweight Championship, Rinauro debuted under the name "Mellow" as a member of Special K in Ring of Honor. After beating Antonio Blanca earlier in the show, Rinauro (now using his real name) competed for and won a Ring of Honor Contract by defeating Steve Madison, Claudio Castagnoli, and Jerrelle Clark at Do or Die 5 on August 20, 2005. Rinauro, along with Tony Mamaluke, won the ROH World Tag Team Championship at the show Joe vs. Kobashi on October 1, 2005, by defeating B. J. Whitmer and Jimmy Jacobs. During their reign, they successfully defended against teams such as Whitmer and Jacobs, Homicide and Ricky Reyes, and Colt Cabana and Milano Collection A.T. They lost the title to Austin Aries and Roderick Strong of Generation Next at Final Battle 2005 on December 17, 2005. Rinauro also appeared at Total Nonstop Action Wrestling's Slammiversary event in 2005, as a fan who was attacked by Jeff Jarrett before the King of the Mountain match, causing Jarrett to be (storyline) arrested.

After losing the title, Rinauro competed in the 2006 Trios Tournament at Tag Wars 2006 with Tony Mamaluke and Jay Fury, competing against the likes of The Briscoe Brothers. In 2006, Rinauro's partner Tony Mamaluke signed with World Wrestling Entertainment to be a part of the new ECW brand, leaving Rinauro to start a singles career once more. At Death Before Dishonor IV, it was revealed that Rinauro was the newest member of The Embassy. That night, he teamed with fellow Embassy member Jimmy Rave and they successfully defeated Colt Cabana and Jay Lethal.

The two continued teaming for a few months, but after the Embassy disbanded, the team suffered a roadblock. On October 28, 2006, Rave split the team up. Since then, Rinauro makes occasional appearances in ROH.

=== Full Impact Pro (2005–2008) ===
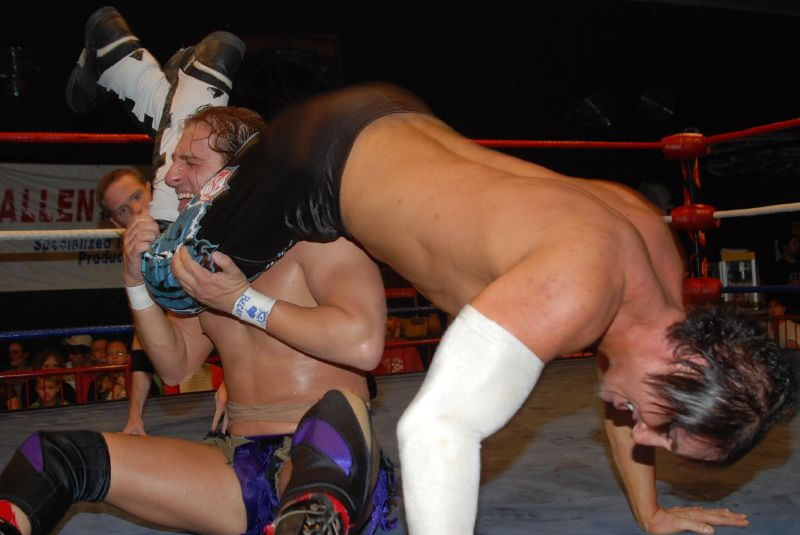
Rinauro (left) wrestling Tony Santarelli in 2007

Rinauro also worked for ROH's sister promotion Full Impact Pro. He achieved tag team success in FIP after winning the Tag Team Championship once with Spanky by defeating Jimmy Rave and "Fast" Eddie Vegas on August 6, 2005. After a singular title defense against Rave and his new tag partner Jay Lethal on September 2, they lost the title to The Heartbreak Express that same night. He also won the Florida Heritage Championship by defeating Erick Stevens on November 9, 2007. After successful title defenses against Tyler Black, Delirious, and Joey Ryan, he dropped the title to Chris Jones on October 11, 2008.

=== Deep South Wrestling (2007) ===
On July 26, 2007, Rinauro and Caleb Konley defeated Simon Sermon and "Pretty Boy" Floyd to win the vacant Tag Team Championship. Rinauro and Konely would end up being the final DSW Tag Team Champions after DSW closed down on October 11, 2007.

=== Independent circuit ===
Currently, Rinauro can be found wrestling throughout the Georgia independent circuit, including Rampage Pro Wrestling, Great Championship Wrestling, NWA Anarchy, Independent Wrestling Network and Southern Extreme Championship Wrestling.

He appeared as an enhancement talent on the November 18, 2008 edition of ECW where he was defeated by the debuting DJ Gabriel.

In October 2009, Rinauro wrestled on two shows for Chikara, being defeated by Mike Quackenbush and Claudio Castagnoli.

Sal Rinauro made a volunteer appearance for Great Championship Wrestling in Phenix City on February 12, 2009, as part of the Miracle of Maegan event to benefit Maegan Johnson, a local girl who suffered a brain trama just several weeks prior. Rinauro teamed with another volunteer, Austin "Consequences" Creed as part of the Road to Goad Tournament, defeating John Bogie & Kareem Abdul Jamar (now Chikara's Sugar Dunkerton) before falling to the Southside Trash.

Rinauro became a permanent fixture in Great Championship Wrestling based on his initial appearance, and now wrestles weekly for the promotion. Currently the GCW Interstate Champion, Rinauro has embroiled in several feuds, with "Suicidal All Star" Mike Kross, "The Urban Legend" Murder One, and former Embassy associate and tag team partner in ROH, Jimmy Rave. Recently GCW secured a television deal to broadcast on cable 24 in Atlanta Georgia; the Pilot broadcast featured the main event of Sal Rinauro vs. Murder One, and the second broadcast featured a main event of him vs. Mike Kross.

Rinauro also wrestles for RAMPAGE Pro Wrestling, a promotion based out of Warner Robins Georgia. He has held the RPW Intercontinental Championship, continued his feud with Jimmy Rave, and also has had several outstanding matches with Austin "Consequences" Creed, who also appears as a regular of the promotion. He has also held the RPW heavy-weight and cruiserweight titles. In summer 2010 Rinauro was named Commissioner of RPW after Nick Patrick left. Rinauro was involved in the 4-corners match to crown the 1st ever RPW T.V. champion where he was unsuccessful. Rinauro faced heavy-weight champion Shaun Banks at Sizzlin Summer Bash 2 where he was unsuccessful. He joined the feud between Jimmy Rave & Kyle Matthews in a non-wrestling role until he resigned in December. On December 18 Rinauro returned as GM to team with Matthews, Drew Adler, Michael Stevens, & Adrian Hawkins against Jimmy Rave, Chip Day, Corey Hollis, Mike Posey, & Jeremy Vain where he was eventually eliminated although his team was victorious. Rinauro participated in a few matches over the next few weeks. On April 2 he challenged Jeremy Vain for the NWA RPW T.V. title where he was unsuccessful. On May 1 Rinauro was the special enforcer in the cage match between Rave & Matthews. Rinauro turned heel joining Rave and costing Matthews the match. On May 15 Rinauro teamed with Vain in a semi-final match in the NWA RPW tag team title tournament against Frankie Valentine and Matthews where they were unsuccessful. Earlier in the night Rinauro teamed with Hollis, Day, & Rave in a losing effort against the NWA RPW tag team champions the Usual Suspects & the NWA world tag team champions the Dark City Fight Club. On May 29 Rinauro faced off against his old rival J-Rod in a losing effort.

Sal is currently working on his self-proclaimed auto biography. " It's hard being a Salifornia kid". The book should be available everywhere books are sold September 23, 2016. He will be signing books the day of release in Daytona Beach, where he currently resides. Sal Rinauro made his last appearance for NWA on January 21, 2020, now he is working for WrestleMerica and Anarchy Wrestling.

== Wrestling Road Diaries ==
In 2011, Roundtable Creations released The Wrestling Road Diaries, a wrestling documentary that features Sal, Colt Cabana and Bryan Danielson. The film was shot over a period of 10 days in September 2009, and follows the wrestlers as they travel from show to show. It also shows them performing for various wrestling companies and training aspiring wrestlers. (Wrestling Road Diaries. Dir. Eric Santamaria. Perf. Colt Cabana, Bryan Danielson, Sal Rinauro. DVD. Roundtable Creations, 2011.)

== Championships and accomplishments ==
- All-Star Wrestling Network
  - AWN Tag Team Championship (1 time) - Fry Daddy
- Deep South Wrestling
  - DSW Tag Team Championship (1 time, final) – with Caleb Konley
- Full Impact Pro
  - FIP Florida Heritage Championship (1 time)
  - FIP Tag Team Championship (1 time) – with Spanky
- Great Championship Wrestling
  - Great Championship Wrestling Interstate Championship (3 times)
- NWA Anarchy
  - NWA Anarchy Tag Team Championship (1 time) – with Seth Delay
- NWA Wildside
  - NWA Wildside Junior Heavyweight Championship (1 time)
  - NWA Beat the Champ Championship (1 time)
- Peachstate Wrestling Alliance
  - PWA No Limits Championship (1 time)
  - PWA Heritage Championship (3 times)
  - PWA Tag Team Championship (1 time) - with Nigel Sherrod
- Pro Wrestling Illustrated
  - Ranked No. 424 of the top 500 singles wrestlers in the PWI 500 in 2021
- Rampage Pro Wrestling
  - RPW Cruiserweight Championship (2 times)
  - RPW Intercontinental Championship (1 time)
  - RPW Heavyweight Championship (1 time)
- Ring of Honor
  - ROH Tag Team Championship (1 time) – with Tony Mamaluke
- Southern Fried Championship Wrestling
  - SFCW Heavyweight Championship (1 time, current)
  - SFCW Classic Championship (1 time)
  - SFCW Tag Team Championship (2 times) - with Sunny Daze
  - Charles William Anschutz Memorial Tournament (2021)
- Southern Honor Wrestling
  - SHW Tag Team Championship (1 time) - with Sunny Daze
- Ultimate Christian Wrestling
  - UCW Heavyweight Championship (1 time)
- Why We Wrestle
  - Anarchy Triple Crown Championship (1 time)
  - Anarchy Tag Team Championship (1 time)– with Seth Delay

== Luchas de Apuestas record ==
Winner (wager)	Loser (wager)	Location	Event	Date	Notes
Sal Rinauro (hair) vs. Gaagz the Gymp (mask) (DRAW)		Tampa, FL	NWA Powerrr	March 7, 2023	
Gaagz the Gymp (mask)	Sal Rinauro (hair)	Highland Park, Illinois	NWA 312	April 7, 2023	
