= FIP World Heavyweight Championship =

Professional wrestling championship

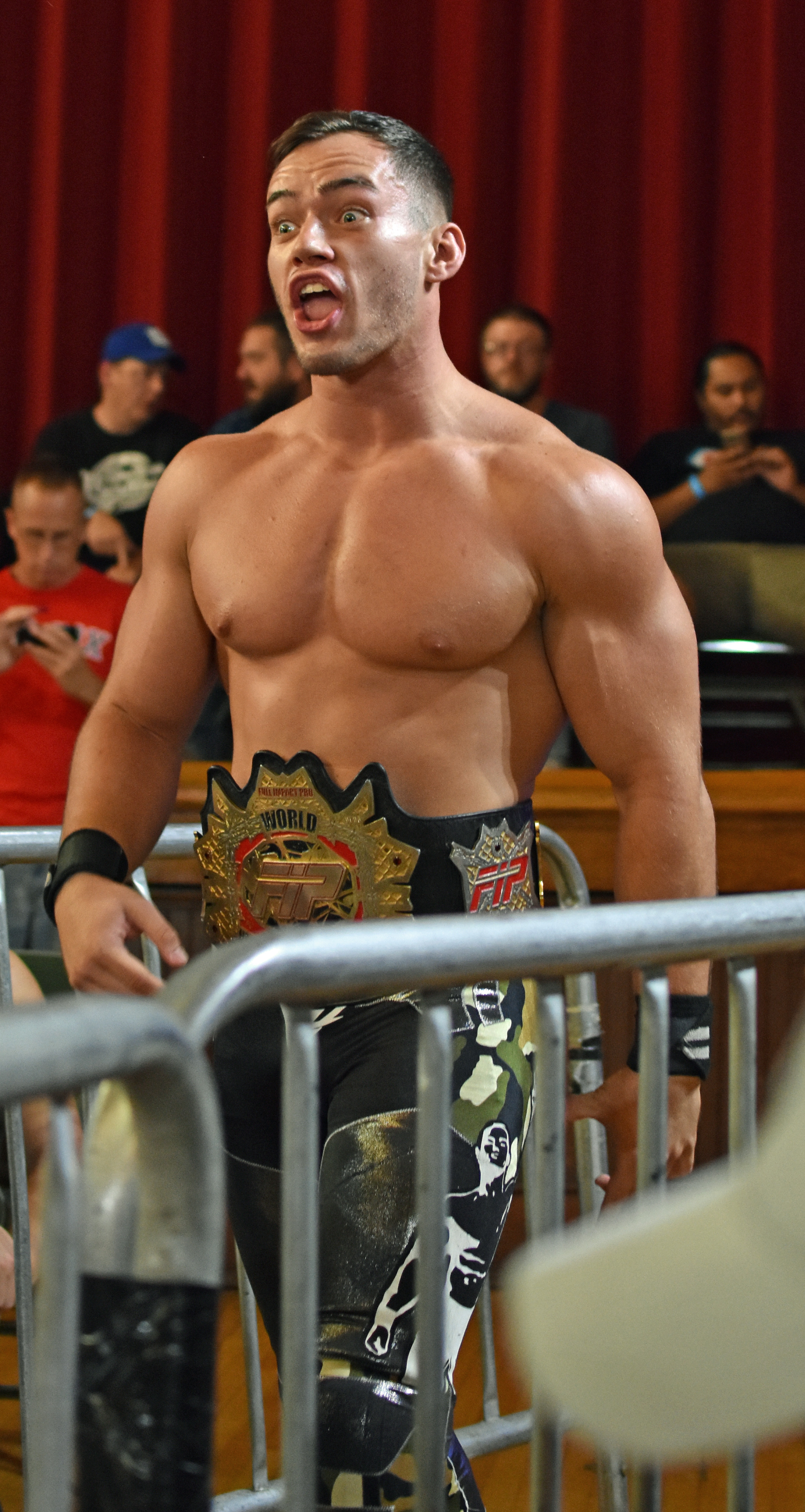
- Former FIP World Heavyweight Champion Austin Theory with the belt, at EVOLVE 112, September 2018.

Details
- Promotion: World Wrestling Network
- Brand: Full Impact Pro (FIP)
- Date established: September 25, 2004
- Current champion: August Artois
- Date won: December 10, 2023

Other names
- FIP Heavyweight Championship (September 25, 2004 – March 3, 2007); FIP World Heavyweight Championship (March 3, 2007 – present)
Statistics
- First champion: Homicide
- Most reigns: Roderick Strong (3 reigns)
- Longest reign: Jon Davis (632 days)
- Shortest reign: Florenz De La Hunt (1 day)
- Oldest champion: Jon Davis (40 years, 189 days)
- Youngest champion: Austin Theory (20 years, 130 days)
- Heaviest champion: Erick Stevens (247 lb (112 kg))
- Lightest champion: Rich Swann (165 lb (75 kg))

The FIP World Heavyweight Championship is a professional wrestling world heavyweight championship held by the Full Impact Pro (FIP), a promotion owned by the World Wrestling Network. It is currently the highest ranked championship in FIP.

== History ==
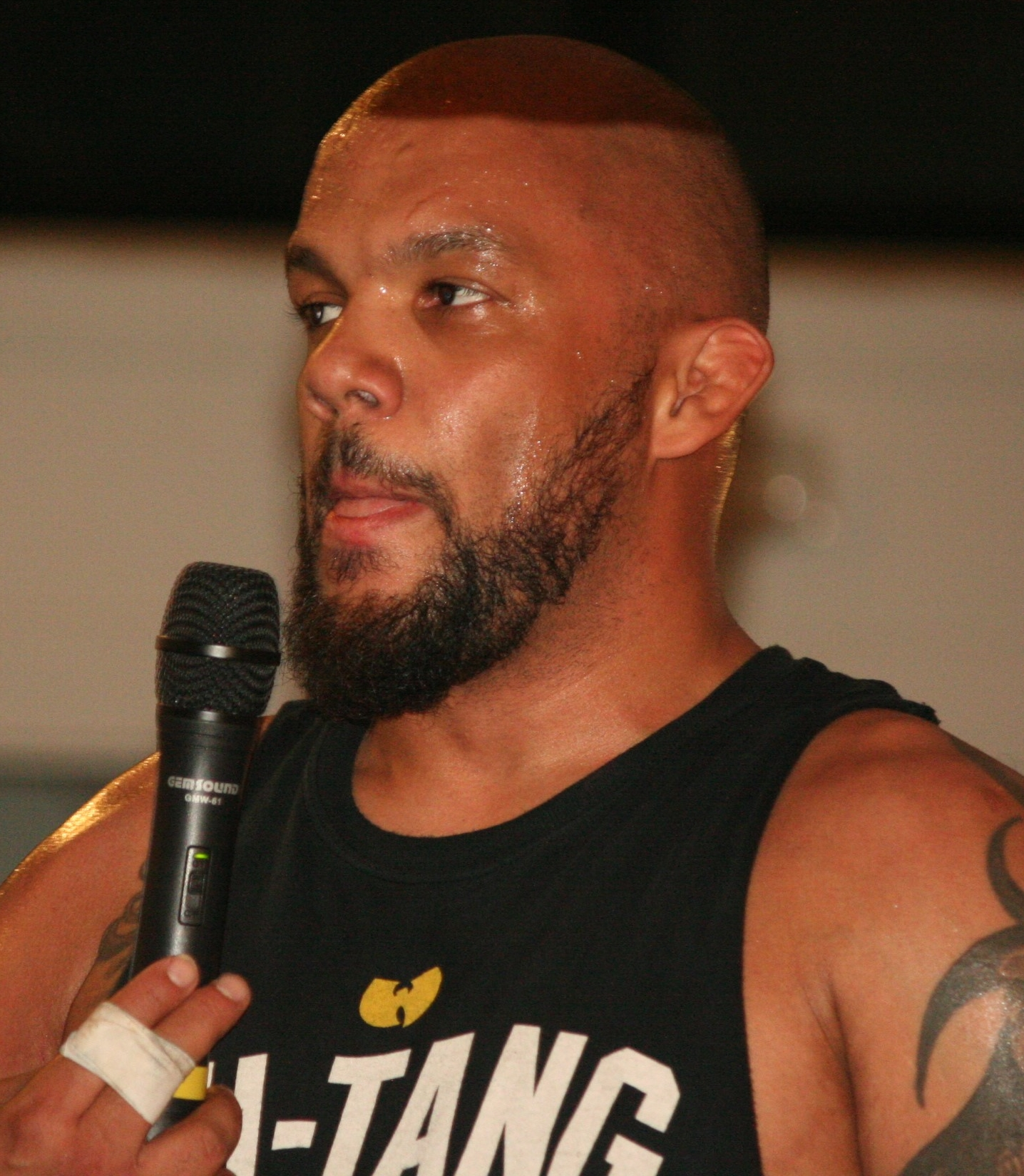
Inaugural champion Homicide.

The title was introduced on September 25, 2004, at FIP's "Emergence: Part Two" event as the FIP Heavyweight Championship. It was renamed the FIP World Heavyweight Championship on March 3, 2007, when then-champion Roderick Strong defeated Pac in Liverpool, England, at the Ring of Honor (ROH) promotion's "Fifth Year Festival: Liverpool" event. Overall, there have been 23 reigns shared among 17 wrestlers. Title changes happen mostly at FIP-promoted events, which are usually released on DVD. The title has changed hands four times at non-FIP events. Reigns two and four occurred at ROH-promoted events, while reigns 10 and 11 happened at Dragon Gate events.

Since being renamed as a "World Championship" after a UK defense in March 2007, the title has been defended internationally multiple times. Not only has the championship been successfully defended in Japan, China, Canada, Mexico but the title has also changed hands in both Japan and China.

On September 25, 2004, at FIP's "Emergence: Part Two" event Homicide became The inaugural champion by defeating CM Punk in the finals of a two-night tournament that concluded.

=== Inaugural FIP Heavyweight Champion Tournament (2004) ===
First Round
Rainman	Pin
Jason Cross	11:15
Scoot Andrews	4:39
Kahagas	Pin
Justin Credible	Pin
Ralph Mosca	3:37
Vordell Walker	13:01
CM Punk	Pin
Austin Aries	Pin
Roderick Strong	17:00
Slim J	6:27
Jerrelle Clark	Pin
Joshua Masters	Pin
Lex Lovett	3:45
AJ Styles	18:04
Homicide	by DQ

Second Round
Rainman	Pin
Kahagas	4:18
Justin Credible	10:51
CM Punk	Pin
Austin Aries	Pin
Jerrelle Clark	7:57
Joshua Masters	1:28
Homicide	Pin

Semi Final
Rainman	13:36
CM Punk	Pin
Austin Aries	15:30
Homicide	Pin

Final
CM Punk	13:23
Homicide	Pin

== Reigns ==
The inaugural champion was Homicide, who defeated CM Punk in the finals of a two-night tournament that concluded on September 25, 2004, at FIP's "Emergence: Part Two" event. Roderick Strong holds the record of most reigns, with three. Jon Davis's second reign is the longest singular reign at 632 days, while Erick Stevens reign is the shortest at 35 days. Davis also holds the record for longest combined reign at 821 days. Davis is also the oldest champion at 40, while Austin Theory is the youngest, having won it at 20.

August Artois is the current champion in his first reign. He defeated Lucky Ali in a bullrope match at WWN Supershow: Mercury Rising on August 27, 2023, in Clearwater, FL.

=== Title Reigns ===
Key
No.	Overall reign number
Reign	Reign number for the specific champion
Days	Number of days held
+	Current reign is changing daily

No.	Champion	Championship change			Reign statistics		Notes	Ref.
No.	Champion	Date	Event	Location	Reign	Days	Notes	Ref.
World Wrestling Network (WWNLive): Full Impact Pro (FIP) and Independent circuit
1	Homicide	September 25, 2004	Emergence: Part Two	Tampa, FL	1	476	Homicide defeated CM Punk in a tournament final to become the first champion.	
2	Bryan Danielson	January 14, 2006	ROH Hell Freezes Over	Philadelphia, PA	1	300	This was a three-way dance also involving Roderick Strong.	
3	Roderick Strong	November 10, 2006	All or Nothing	Inverness, FL	1	415	The title was renamed the "FIP World Heavyweight Championship" on March 3, 2007, when Strong defeated Pac in Liverpool, England, at ROH's Fifth Year Festival: Liverpool event.	
4	Erick Stevens	December 30, 2007	Final Battle	New York City, NY	1	48		
5	Roderick Strong	February 16, 2008	Redefined	Crystal River, FL	2	154		
6	Erick Stevens	July 19, 2008	Hot Summer Nights	Crystal River, FL	2	35	This was a Dog Collar match.	
7	Go Shiozaki	August 23, 2008	Heatstroke	Crystal River, FL	1	119		
8	Tyler Black	December 20, 2008	Unstoppable	Crystal River, FL	1	133		
9	Davey Richards	May 2, 2009	Unfinished Business	Crystal River, FL	1	218	Richards was awarded the championship by forfeit after Tyler Black suffered a neck injury the previous night in Berwyn, IL and was forced to relinquish the title.	
10	Masaaki Mochizuki	December 6, 2009	Dragon Gate The Gate of Generation	Sapporo, Japan	1	48		
11	Davey Richards	January 23, 2010	DGUSA Fearless	Chicago, IL	2	58		
—	Vacated	March 22, 2010	—	—	—	—	The championship was vacated by the FIP Championship Committee due to "an unforeseen contractual situation" with Davey Richards.	
12	Jon Moxley	April 17, 2010	Southern Stampede	Crystal River, FL	1	360	Moxley defeated Roderick Strong to win the vacant title.	
—	Vacated	April 12, 2011	—	—	—	—	The championship was vacated by the FIP Championship Committee due to Jon Moxley signing with WWE.	
13	Jon Davis	February 1, 2013	Everything Burns	Tampa, FL	1	189	Davis defeated A. R. Fox to win the vacant title.	
14	Trent Baretta	August 9, 2013	Heatstroke	Tampa, FL	1	462		
15	Rich Swann	November 14, 2014	WWNLive in China	Chengdu, Sichuan	1	98		
—	Vacated	February 20, 2015	Ascension	Tampa, FL	—	—	The championship was vacated due to Rich Swann being sidelined with an injury.	
16	Roderick Strong	February 20, 2015	Ascension	Tampa, FL	3	57	Strong defeated Trent Baretta in a no disqualification match to win the vacant championship.	
17	Rich Swann	April 18, 2015	Establish Dominance	Orlando, FL	2	76		
18	Caleb Konley	July 3, 2015	Declaration of Independence	Tampa, FL	1	329		
19	Fred Yehi	May 27, 2016	Accelerate	Orlando, FL	1	562		
20	Austin Theory	December 10, 2017	Evolve 97	Melrose, MA	1	294		
21	Anthony Henry	September 30, 2018	Accelerate	Ybor City, FL	1	509		
22	Jon Davis	February 21, 2020	Everything Burns	Ybor City, FL	2	632		
23	Karam	November 14, 2021	WWN Supershow: Battle of the Belts	Clearwater, FL	1	292		
24	Florenz De La Hunt	September 2, 2022	POW Wrestling Rumble	Geesthacht, Germany	1	1		
25	Karam	September 3, 2022	POW Wrestling Rumble	Hamburg, Germany	2	330		
26	Lucky Ali	July 30, 2023	Heatstroke	Clearwater, FL	1	28	It was in a winner takes all match where Ali's WWN Proving Ground Heavyweight Championship and ACW Heavyweight Championship were also at stake.	
27	Brian Brock	August 27, 2023	WWN SuperShow: Mercury Rising	Clearwater, FL	1	105		
28	August Artois	December 10, 2023	WWN First Annual Heath D. Schneider Memorial Battle For The Belts	Clearwater, FL	1	1,064+	This was a bullrope match.	

== Combined reigns ==
As of 8 November 2026

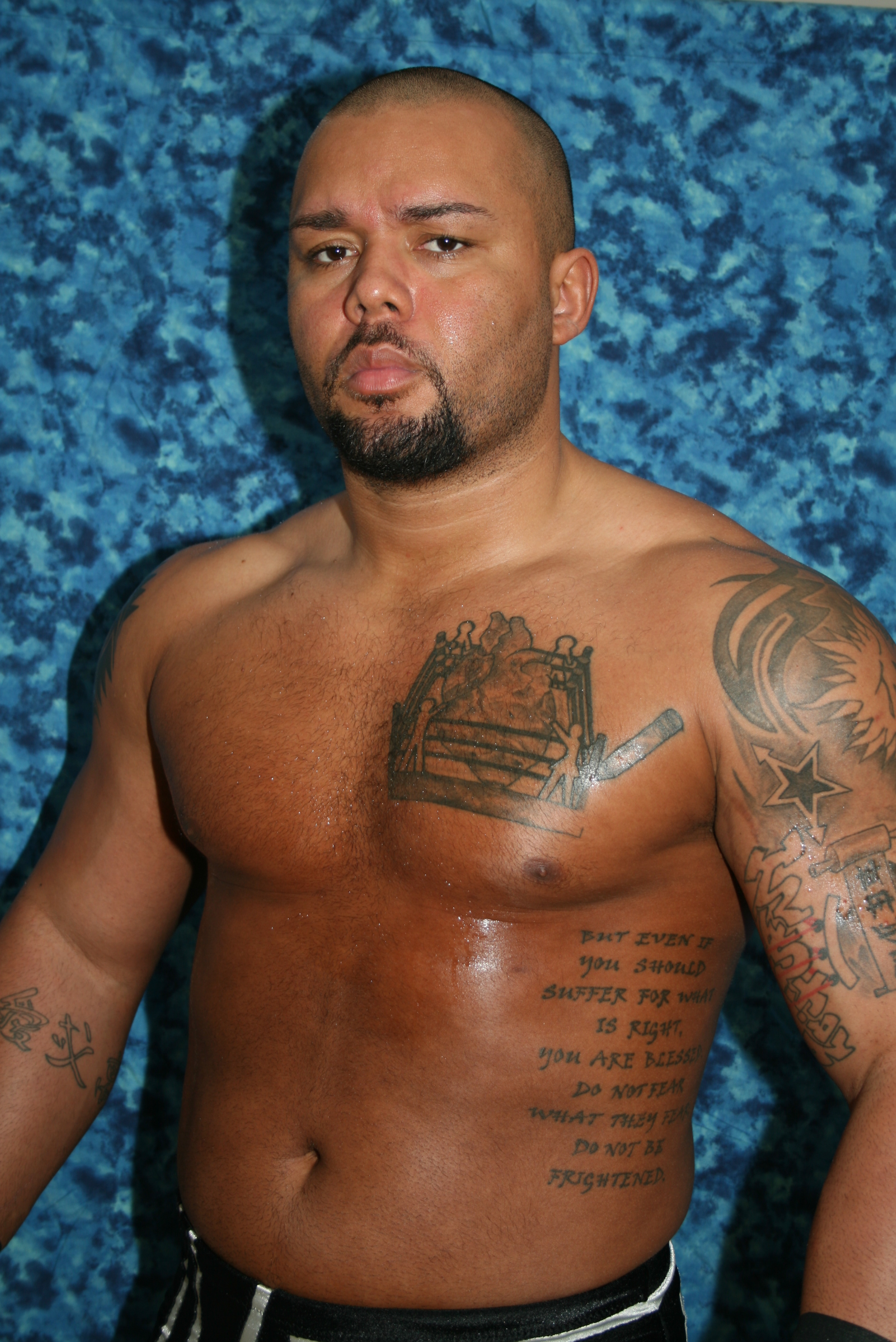
Two-time champion Jon Davis, who holds the records for longest singular reign at 632 days and longest combined reign at 821 days

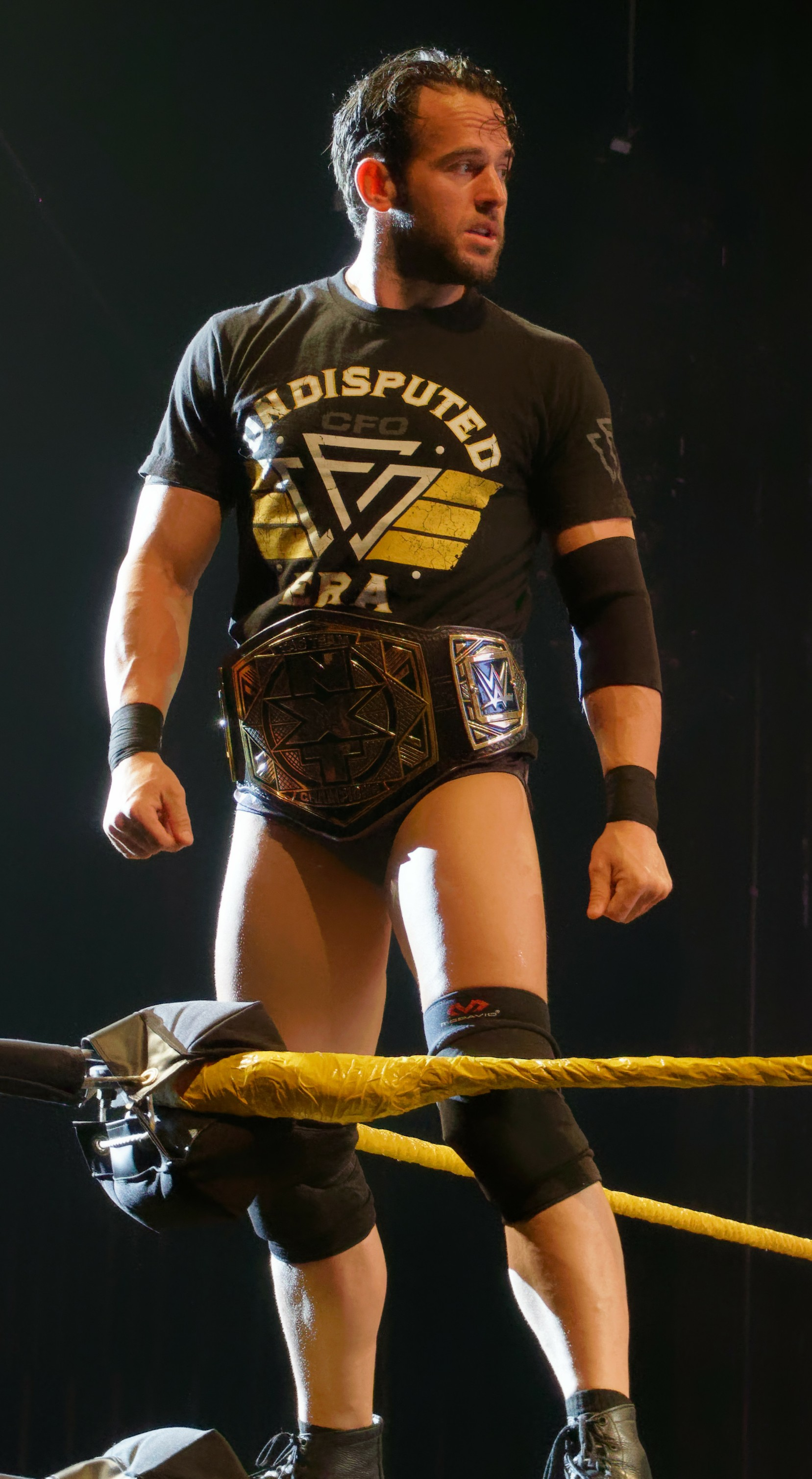
Record three-time champion Roderick Strong.

Key
†	Indicates the current champion(s)

Rank	Wrestler	No. of reigns	Combined days
1	August Artois †	1	1,064+
2	Jon Davis	2	821
3	Roderick Strong	3	626
4	Karam	2	622
5	Fred Yehi	1	562
6	Anthony Henry	1	509
7	Homicide	1	476
8	Trent Baretta	1	462
9	Jon Moxley	1	360
10	Caleb Konley	1	329
11	Bryan Danielson	1	300
12	Austin Theory	1	294
13	Davey Richards	2	276
14	Rich Swann	2	174
15	Tyler Black	1	133
16	Go Shiozaki	1	119
17	Brian Brock	1	105
18	Erick Stevens	2	83
19	Masaaki Mochizuki	1	49
20	Lucky Ali	1	28
21	Florenz De La Hunt	1	1
