= Oak Grove =

Oak Grove may refer to:

== Places in the United States ==
=== Alabama ===
- McGehee–Stringfellow House, also known as "Oak Grove", Hale County
- Bessemer, Alabama, also known as "Oak Grove", Jefferson County, Alabama and home of schools named Oak Grove
- Oak Grove, Alabama

=== Arizona ===
- Oak Grove, Arizona

=== Arkansas ===
- Oak Grove, Arkansas (disambiguation), multiple places
- Oak Grove Township, Lonoke County, Arkansas

=== California ===
- Oak Grove, Butte County, California
- Oak Grove, former name of El Sobrante in Contra Costa County
- Oak Grove, San Diego County, California, site of Oak Grove Butterfield Stage Station, Warner Springs, and 2nd location of Camp Wright

=== Colorado ===
- Oak Grove, Colorado, in Montrose County, Colorado

=== Delaware ===
- Oak Grove, Delaware, a number of places in Delaware

=== Florida ===
- Oak Grove, Citrus County, Florida, a place in Florida
- Oak Grove, Escambia County, Florida
- Oak Grove, Gadsden County, Florida
- Oak Grove, Gulf County, Florida
- Oak Grove, Hardee County, Florida
- Oak Grove, Okaloosa County, Florida
- Oak Grove, Sumter County, Florida

=== Georgia ===
- Oak Grove, Georgia

=== Illinois ===
- Oak Grove, Illinois

=== Indiana ===
- Oak Grove, Posey County, Indiana, in Posey County
- Oak Grove, Starke County, Indiana, in Starke County
- Oak Grove Township, Benton County, Indiana

=== Kentucky ===
- Oak Grove, Kentucky
- Oak Grove, Trigg County, Kentucky

=== Louisiana ===
- Oak Grove, Ascension Parish, Louisiana, an unincorporated community in Ascension Parish, Louisiana
- Oak Grove, Cameron Parish, Louisiana, an unincorporated community in Cameron Parish, Louisiana
- Oak Grove, Grant Parish, an unincorporated community in Grant Parish, Louisiana
- Oak Grove, West Carroll Parish, Louisiana

=== Maryland ===
- Oak Grove (La Plata, Maryland), in Charles County

=== Massachusetts ===
- Oak Grove (MBTA station), a stop on Boston's Orange Line subway, straddling Malden and Melrose
- Oak Grove Farm, Millis

=== Michigan ===
- Oak Grove, Livingston County, Michigan, a community in Cohoctah Township
- Oak Grove, Oakland County, Michigan, a community in Bloomfield Township & Auburn Hills
- Oak Grove, Otsego County, Michigan, a community in Bagley Township

=== Minnesota ===
- Oak Grove, Minnesota (formerly Oak Grove Township, Anoka County, Minnesota)

=== Mississippi ===
- Oak Grove, Mississippi, suburb of Hattiesburg
- Oak Grove (Church Hill, Mississippi), in Jefferson County

=== Missouri ===
- Oak Grove, Jackson County, Missouri, a city
- Oak Grove, Madison County, Missouri, an unincorporated community
- Oak Grove Village, Missouri, a village in Franklin County
- Oak Grove Heights, Missouri, an unincorporated community in Greene County

=== New Jersey ===
- Oak Grove, New Jersey

=== North Carolina ===
- Oak Grove (Erwin, North Carolina), in Cumberland County
- Oak Grove, Durham County, North Carolina
- Oak Grove Township, Durham County, North Carolina
- Oak Grove, Jones County, North Carolina
- Oak Grove, Macon County, North Carolina
- Oak Grove, Surry County, North Carolina

=== Ohio ===
- Oak Grove, Ohio

=== Oklahoma ===
- Oak Grove, Murray County, Oklahoma
- Oak Grove, Pawnee County, Oklahoma
- Oak Grove, Payne County, Oklahoma, in Payne County, Oklahoma

=== Oregon ===
- Oak Grove, Oregon

=== Pennsylvania ===
- Oak Grove, Pennsylvania, a community at the start of PA Route 271 in Ligonier Township, Westmoreland County, Pennsylvania

=== South Carolina ===
- Oak Grove, South Carolina
- Oak Grove, Hampton County, South Carolina, in Hampton County

=== Tennessee ===
- Oak Grove, Clay County, Tennessee, an unincorporated community in Clay County, Tennessee
- Oak Grove, Hardin County, Tennessee, an unincorporated community
- Oak Grove, Sumner County, Tennessee, a census-designated place
- Oak Grove, Washington County, Tennessee, a census-designated place

=== Texas ===
- Oak Grove, Bowie County, Texas, an unincorporated community
- Oak Grove, Kaufman County, Texas, a town
- Oak Grove, Tarrant County, Texas, a suburb of Fort Worth
- Oak Grove Power Plant, a power plant in Robertson County

=== Virginia ===
- Oak Grove, Westmoreland County, Virginia
- Oak Grove, Northumberland County, Virginia
- Oak Grove, Loudoun County, Virginia
- Oak Grove, Chesapeake, Virginia, in Chesapeake, Virginia
- Oak Grove (Altavista, Virginia), in Campbell County
- Oak Grove (Eastville, Virginia), in Northampton County
- Oak Grove (Manakin-Sabot, Virginia)
- Oak Grove United Methodist Church, Chesapeake

=== West Virginia ===
- Oak Grove, Mercer County, West Virginia
- Oak Grove, Pendleton County, West Virginia

=== Wisconsin ===
- Oak Grove, Barron County, Wisconsin, a town
- Oak Grove, Dodge County, Wisconsin, a town
- Oak Grove (community), Wisconsin, an unincorporated community
- Oak Grove, Eau Claire County, Wisconsin, a ghost town
- Oak Grove, Pierce County, Wisconsin, a town

== Other uses ==
- Battle of Oak Grove, Civil War battle that took place on June 25, 1862 in Henrico County, Virginia
- Oak forest, a plant community with a tree canopy dominated by oaks

== See also ==
- Oakgrove (disambiguation)
- Oak Grove School (disambiguation)
  - Oak Grove High School (disambiguation)
  - Oak Grove Elementary School (disambiguation)
  - Oak Grove School District (disambiguation)
- Oak Grove Cemetery (disambiguation)
- Oak Grove Township (disambiguation)
