= List of places in Arizona (O) =

This is a list of cities, towns, unincorporated communities, counties, and other places in the U.S. state of Arizona, which start with the letter O. This list is derived from the Geographic Names Information System, which has numerous errors, so it also includes many ghost towns and historical places that are not necessarily communities or actual populated places. This list also includes information on the number and names of counties in which the place lies, its lower and upper ZIP code bounds, if applicable, its U.S. Geological Survey (USGS) reference number(s) (called the GNIS), class as designated by the USGS, and incorporated community located in (if applicable).

== O ==
Name of place	Number of counties	Principal county	GNIS #(s)	Class	Located in	ZIP code	
Name of place	Number of counties	Principal county	GNIS #(s)	Class	Located in	Lower	Upper
Oak Creek	1	Yavapai	32426	Populated Place			
Oak Grove	1	Mohave	24541	Populated Place			
Oak Springs	1	Apache	2582834	CDP		86506	
Oatman	1	Mohave	2582835	CDP		86433	
Octave	1	Yavapai	25258	Populated Place		85332	
Oit Ihuk	1	Pima	32483	Populated Place			
Olberg	1	Pinal	24543	Populated Place		85247	
Old Columbine	1	Graham	8941	Populated Place		85546	
Old Glory	1	Santa Cruz	32501	Populated Place			
Old Leupp	1	Coconino	6981	Populated Place			
Oljato-Monument Valley	1	Navajo	2408987	CDP			
Oracle	1	Pinal	2408994	CDP		85623	
Oracle Junction	1	Pinal	24547	Populated Place			
Oraibi	1	Navajo	45584	Populated Place	Kykotsmovi Village	86039	
Orange Grove Mobile Manor	1	Yuma	2582836	CDP			
Oro Blanco	1	Santa Cruz	36757	Populated Place			
Oro Valley	1	Pima	2413092	Civil (town)		85737	
Overgaard	1	Navajo	32586	Populated Place		85933	
Oxbow Estates	1	Gila	2582837	CDP		85623	
