= List of places in Florida: N-O =

This list of current cities, towns, unincorporated communities, counties, and other recognized places in the U.S. state of Florida also includes information on the number and names of counties in which the place lies, and its lower and upper zip code bounds, if applicable.

Name of place	Number of counties	Counties	Lower zip code	Upper zip code
Nalcrest	1	Polk	33856	
Naples	1	Collier	33939	99
Naples Manor	1	Collier	33940	
Naples Park	1	Collier	33940	
Naranja	1	Miami-Dade	33092	
Naranja-Princeton	1	Miami-Dade		
Narcoossee	1	Osceola	32769	
Nash	1	Jefferson	32336	
Nashua	1	Putnam		
Nassau Village	1	Nassau	32034	
Nassau Village-Ratliff	1	Nassau		
Nassauville	1	Nassau		
National Gardens	1	Volusia	32074	
Nautilus	1	Miami-Dade		
Navair	1	Columbia		
Naval Air Medical Center	1	Escambia		
Naval Air Station	1	Escambia		
Naval Air Station Unit	1	Monroe	33040	
Naval Coastal Systems Laboratory	1	Bay	32407	
Naval Education and Training Program Development Center	1	Escambia	32509	
Naval Hospital	1	Duval		
Naval Regional Medical Clinic	1	Monroe	33040	
Naval Station	1	Escambia	32508	
Naval Technical Training Center	1	Escambia	32511	
Naval Training Center	1	Orange	32813	
Navarre	1	Santa Rosa	32566	
Navarre Beach	1	Santa Rosa		
Navy Point	1	Escambia		
Neals	1	Gilchrist		
Neals Landing	1	Jackson		
Neheb	1	Seminole		
Neilhurst	1	Clay		
Neilson	1	Polk		
Neoga	1	Flagler		
Neptune Beach	1	Duval	32266	
Neukons	1	Pasco	34248	
Nevins	1	Indian River		
New Berlin	1	Duval	32226	
Newbern	1	Hillsborough	33549	
Newberry	1	Alachua	32669	
Newburn	1	Suwannee	32060	
Newcastle	1	Duval		
Newco	1	Columbia		
New Eden	1	Osceola		
New Harmony	1	Walton	32433	
New Home	1	Walton		
New Hope	1	Calhoun		
New Hope	1	Holmes	32464	
New Hope	1	Washington	32462	
New Liberty City	1	Miami-Dade	33054	
Newnans Lake Homesites	1	Alachua		
Newnansville	1	Alachua	32615	
New Pierce	1	Manatee	33588	
New Point Comfort	1	Charlotte	33533	
Newport	1	Monroe	33037	
Newport	1	Wakulla	32327	
New Port of Miami	1	Miami-Dade		
New Port Richey	1	Pasco	34653	91
New Port Richey East	1	Pasco	33552	
New River	1	Bradford	32054	
New River	1	Broward	33312	
New Smyrna Beach	1	Volusia	32169	
New Tampa	1	Hillsborough		
Newton	1	Levy		
Newtown Heights	1	Sarasota	33580	
New Upsala	1	Seminole	32771	
New Wales	1	Polk		
New York	1	Santa Rosa	32565	
Niceville	1	Okaloosa	32578	
Nichols	1	Polk	33863	
Niles	1	Gulf		
Nine Mile	1	Franklin		
Ninemile Bend	1	Palm Beach		
Nixon	1	Bay		
Nob Hill	1	Broward	33322	
Nobles	1	Escambia	32504	
Nobleton	1	Hernando	34661	
Nocatee	1	DeSoto	33864	
Nocatee	1	St. Johns	32081	
Nokomis	1	Sarasota	34275	
Nokomis Beach	1	Sarasota		
Noma	1	Holmes	32452	
Noma Junction	1	Holmes		
No Name Key	1	Monroe		
Noralyn	1	Polk		
Norfleet	1	Leon	32304	
Norin Plaza	1	Miami-Dade	33161	
Norland	1	Miami-Dade	33169	
Normandy	1	Duval	32205	
Normandy	1	Miami-Dade	33141	
Normandy Isle	1	Miami-Dade	33141	
Normandy Manor	1	Duval	32205	
Normandy Shores	1	Miami-Dade		
Normandy Village	1	Duval	32222	
North Andrews Gardens	1	Broward	33308	
North Andrews Terrace	1	Broward		
North Babcock	1	Brevard	32901	
North Bal Harbor	1	Broward		
North Bay Village	1	Miami-Dade	33141	
North Beach	1	Indian River		
North Brooksville	1	Hernando		
North Cocoa	1	Brevard	32922	
North Crest	1	Orange	32703	
Northdale	1	Hillsborough	33624	
North DeLand	1	Volusia		
Northeast Florida State Hospital	1	Baker	32063	
Northeast Park	1	Pinellas	33704	
North Fort Myers	1	Lee	33903	
North Gainesville	1	Alachua		
North Inverness	1	Citrus		
North Key Largo	1	Monroe		
North Key Largo Beach	1	Monroe	33054	59
North LaBelle	1	Hendry		
North Lauderdale	1	Broward	33068	
North Meadowbrook Terrace	1	Clay		
North Merritt Island	1	Brevard	32953	
North Miami	1	Miami-Dade	33161	
North Miami Beach	1	Miami-Dade	33160	
North Naples	1	Collier	33940	
North Oak Hill	1	Duval	32210	
North Orlando	1	Seminole		
North Palm Beach	1	Palm Beach	33408	
North Peninsula	1	Volusia		
North Pompano Beach	1	Broward		
North Port	1	Sarasota	34287	
North Port Charlotte	1	Sarasota		
North Redington Beach	1	Pinellas	33708	
North River Shores	1	Martin	33494	
North Ruskin	1	Hillsborough		
North Sarasota	1	Sarasota		
North Shore	1	Duval	32208	
North Shore Junction	1	Duval	32208	
North Side	1	Bay	32405	
Northside	1	Miami-Dade	33147	
Northside	1	Sarasota	33580	
North Weeki Wachee	1	Hernando		
Northwest	1	Miami-Dade	33147	
North Winter Haven	1	Polk	33880	
Northwood	1	Alachua	32605	
Northwood	1	Palm Beach	33407	
Northwood Plaza	1	Pinellas	33519	
Norwalk	1	Putnam		
Norwood	1	Miami-Dade	33169	
Nova Road	1	Volusia	32074	
Nowatney	1	Hillsborough		
Nubbin Ridge	1	Okaloosa		
Nurmi Isles	1	Broward		
Nutall Rise	1	Taylor	32347	
Oak	1	Marion	32670	
Oakbrook Square	1	Palm Beach	33408	
Oak Crest	1	Alachua	32640	
Oakcrest	1	Marion	32670	
Oakdale	1	Jackson	32446	
Oak Forest	1	Miami-Dade		
Oak Grove	1	Citrus	34461	
Oak Grove	1	Escambia	32568	
Oak Grove	1	Gadsden	32324	
Oak Grove	1	Gulf	32456	
Oak Grove	1	Hardee	33873	
Oak Grove	1	Okaloosa	32531	
Oak Grove	1	Sumter		
Oak Harbor	1	Duval	32233	
Oak Haven	1	Duval	32216	
Oak Hill	1	Duval		
Oak Hill	1	Volusia	32759	
Oak Hill Park	1	Duval	32210	
Oakhurst	1	Pinellas	33540	
Oak Knoll	1	Manatee		
Oak Knoll Estates	1	Leon		
Oak Lake	1	Okeechobee		
Oakland	1	Orange	34760	
Oakland Hills	1	Seminole	32810	
Oakland Park	1	Broward	33334	
Oakland Park	1	Lake	32757	
Oakland Shores	1	Orange	32751	
OakLeaf Plantation	2	Clay, Duval		
Oak Park	1	Wakulla		
Oak Point	1	Broward		
Oak Ridge	1	Orange		
Oak Ridge	1	Polk		
Oak Terrace	1	Polk	33860	
Oakwood Villa	1	Duval	32211	
O'Brien	1	Suwannee	32071	
Ocala	1	Marion	34470	82
Ocala Estates	1	Marion		
Ocala Ridge	1	Marion	32670	
Ocala West	1	Marion	32670	
Occidental	1	Hamilton		
Ocean Beach	1	Brevard	32931	
Ocean Breeze	1	Martin	33457	
Ocean Breeze Park	1	Martin	33457	
Ocean City	1	Okaloosa	32548	
Ocean Ridge	1	Palm Beach	33435	
Ocean View	1	Miami-Dade	33140	
Ocean View Heights	1	Miami-Dade		
Ocean Vue	1	Broward		
Oceanway	1	Duval	32218	
Ocheesee	1	Calhoun		
Ocheesee Landing	1	Calhoun		
Ocheeseulga	1	Calhoun		
Ochlockonee	1	Leon		
Ochlockonee	1	Wakulla		
Ochlockonee Bay	1	Wakulla		
Ochopee	1	Collier	33943	
Ocklawaha	1	Marion		
Ocoee	1	Orange	34761	
Octahatchee	1	Hamilton		
Odena	1	Gulf		
Odessa	1	Pasco	33556	
Ohio Key	1	Monroe		
Ojus	1	Miami-Dade	33180	
Okahumpka	1	Lake	34762	
Okaloo	1	Okaloosa		
Okaloosa Island	1	Okaloosa	32548	
Okeechobee	1	Okeechobee	34972	74
Okeechobee Farm Labor Supply Center	1	Palm Beach		
Okeelanta	1	Palm Beach	33493	
Oklawaha	1	Marion	32179	
Old Callaway	1	Bay	32401	
Old Fernandina	1	Nassau		
Old Grove	1	Collier		
Old Marco Junction	1	Collier		
Old Myakka	1	Sarasota		
Old Palm Golf Club	1	Palm Beach		
Oldsmar	1	Pinellas	34677	
Old Town	1	Dixie	32680	
Old Venus	1	Highlands		
Olga	1	Lee		
Olive	1	Escambia		
Olustee	1	Baker	32072	
Olympia Heights	1	Miami-Dade	33175	
Omni Plaza	1	Miami-Dade	33132	
Ona	1	Hardee	33865	
Oneco	1	Manatee	34264	
One Hundred Sixty-third Street	1	Miami-Dade	33162	
O'Neil	1	Nassau	32034	
Oolite	1	Miami-Dade		
Opa-locka	1	Miami-Dade	33054	56
Opa-locka North	1	Miami-Dade		
Open Air	1	Pinellas	33701	
Open Sands	1	Bay		
Orange	1	Liberty	32321	
Orange Bend	1	Lake	32748	
Orange Blossom	1	Lake	32737	
Orange Blossom	1	Orange	32855	
Orange Blossom Gardens	1	Lake		
Orange Blossom Hills	1	Marion	32691	
Orange Blossom Hills South	1	Lake		
Orange City	1	Volusia	32725	74
Orange City Hills	1	Volusia	32763	
Orangedale	1	Polk	33801	
Orangedale	1	St. Johns	32043	
Orange Grove Villas	1	Pasco		
Orange Hammock	1	Flagler	32010	
Orange Heights	1	Alachua	32640	
Orange Hill	1	Washington	32428	
Orange Home	1	Sumter	32786	
Orange Lake	1	Marion	32681	
Orange Lake Village	1	Pinellas	33542	
Orange Mills	1	Putnam	32031	
Orange Mountain	1	Lake		
Orange Park	1	Clay	32073	
Orange Springs	1	Marion	32182	
Orangetree	1	Collier		
Orchid	1	Indian River	32960	
Orienta Gardens	1	Seminole	32701	
Orient Park	1	Hillsborough	33614	
Oriole Beach	1	Santa Rosa	32561	
Orlampa	1	Polk		
Orlando	1	Orange	32801	72
Orlando Beach	1	Brevard		
Orlando Naval Hospital	1	Orange	32813	
Orlando Naval Training Center	1	Orange	32813	
Orlo Vista	1	Orange	32811	
Ormond	1	Volusia		
Ormond Beach	1	Volusia	32174	
Ormond by the Sea	1	Volusia	32174	
Ormond-by-the-Sea	1	Volusia		
Orsino	1	Brevard		
Ortega	1	Duval	32210	
Ortega Farms	1	Duval		
Ortega Forest	1	Duval	32230	
Ortega Hills	1	Duval	32230	
Ortega Terrace	1	Duval		
Ortona	1	Glades		
Ortona	1	Volusia		
Osceola	1	Seminole		
Osceola Forest	1	Duval	32208	
Osceola Park	1	Broward		
Oslo	1	Indian River		
Osowaw Junction	1	Okeechobee		
Osprey	1	Sarasota	34229	
Osteen	1	Volusia	32764	
Otis	1	Duval	32220	
Otter Creek	1	Levy	32683	
Otter Springs	1	Gilchrist		
Overbrook Gardens	1	Sarasota	33533	
Overstreet	1	Gulf	32453	
Oviedo	1	Seminole	32765	
Owensboro	1	Pasco		
Owl's Head	1	Walton		
Oxford	1	Sumter	34484	
Oyster Bayou	1	Pasco	33552	
Ozello	1	Citrus	32629	
Ozona	1	Pinellas	34660	

== See also ==
- Florida
- List of municipalities in Florida
- List of former municipalities in Florida
- List of counties in Florida
- List of census-designated places in Florida
