= Oak Grove School District 68 =

Oak Grove School District could refer to:

- Oak Grove School District 68 (Bartonville, Illinois), with two primary schools in Peoria County
- Oak Grove School District 68 (Lake County, Illinois), with one primary school in Oak Grove

== See also ==
- Oak Grove School (disambiguation)
- Oak Grove School District (disambiguation)
