= Oakgrove =

Oakgrove may refer to:

in England

- Oakgrove, Cheshire
- Oakgrove, Milton Keynes

in Ireland

- Oakgrove Integrated College, Derry, Northern Ireland

in the United States

- McGehee-Stringfellow House, a former plantation known as Oakgrove, near Greensboro, Alabama

== See also ==
- Oak Grove (disambiguation)
