= FOW Light Heavyweight Championship =

Professional wrestling championship

Details
- Promotion: Future of Wrestling
- Date established: December 1, 2001
- Date retired: 2003
Statistics
- First champion(s): Johnny Vandal
- Final champion(s): Justice
- Most reigns: David Babylon (6 reigns)
- Longest reign: Johnny Vandal (70 days)

The FOW Light Heavyweight Championship was a professional wrestling title in American independent promotion Future of Wrestling. The title was created when Johnny Vandal won the title in Davie, Florida on December 1, 2001. It was defended throughout southern Florida, most often in Davie, Plantation, Boca Raton and occasionally in Orlando, Florida. The title was abandoned shortly before the promotion closed in early 2003. There have been a total of 9 recognized individual champions, who have had a combined 22 official reigns.

== Title history ==
No.	Wrestlers	Reigns	Date	Days held	Place	Notes
1	Johnny Vandal	1	December 1, 2001	70	Davie, Florida	Defeated Al Bino
2	J-Dawg	1	February 9, 2002	63	Davie, Florida	Defeated previous champion Johnny Vandal, Ricky Vandal and Tommy Vandal in a four-way Ladder match.
3	Al Bino	1	April 13, 2002	35	Davie, Florida	Defeated previous champion J-Dawg and Johnny Vandal in a Three-way match.
4	Jeff Roth	1	May 18, 2002	29	Plantation, Florida	
5	Al Bino	2	June 16, 2002	20	Hollywood, Florida	
6	Chris Charger	1	July 6, 2002	<1	Plantation, Florida	Title is unified with the FOW Hardcore Championship.
7	Tommy Vandal	1	July 6, 2002	14	Plantation, Florida	
8	David Babylon	1	July 20, 2002	7	Orlando, Florida	
9	J-Dawg	2	July 27, 2002	14	Oakland Park, Florida	
10	Tommy Vandal	2	August 10, 2002	<1	Plantation, Florida	Defeated previous champion J-Dawg and David Babylon in a Three-way Dance match.
11	Johnny Vandal	2	August 10, 2002	21	Plantation, Florida	
12	David Babylon	2	August 31, 2002	34	Plantation, Florida	
13	Al Bino	3	October 4, 2002	<1	Boca Raton, Florida	
14	David Babylon	3	October 4, 2002	<1	Boca Raton, Florida	
15	Johnny Vandal	3	October 4, 2002	<1	Boca Raton, Florida	
16	David Babylon	4	October 4, 2002	<1	Boca Raton, Florida	
17	Dan Evans	1	October 4, 2002	<1	Boca Raton, Florida	
18	David Babylon	5	October 4, 2002	<1	Boca Raton, Florida	
19	Johnny Vandal	4	October 4, 2002	<1	Boca Raton, Florida	
20	David Babylon	6	October 4, 2002	36	Boca Raton, Florida	
21	Naphtali	4	November 9, 2002	35	Plantation, Florida	
22	Justice	1	December 14, 2002	–	Pembroke Pines, Florida	Justice remains champion until the promotion closes in early 2003.

== Combined reigns ==
Rank	Wrestler	No. of reigns	Combined days
1	Johnny Vandal	4	91
2	Al Bino/Naphtali	4	90
3	David Babylon	6	77
3	J-Dawg	2	77
5	Jeff Roth	1	29
6	Tommy Vandal	2	14
7	Chris Charger	1	<1
7	Dan Evans	1	<1
9	Justice	1	–
