= Apollo Beach, Florida =

Unincorporated community in Florida, US

- Census-designated place
- Location of Apollo Beach in Hillsborough County, Florida.
- Coordinates: 27°45′19″N 82°23′49″W
- Country: United States
- State: Florida
- County: Hillsborough
- Established: 1923

Area
  - Total: 22.29 sq mi (57.73 km^{2})
  - Land: 19.68 sq mi (50.97 km^{2})
  - Water: 2.61 sq mi (6.77 km^{2})
- Elevation: 7 ft (2.1 m)

Population (2020)
  - Total: 26,002
  - Density: 1,321.3/sq mi (510.16/km^{2})
- Time zone: UTC-5 (Eastern (EST))
  - Summer (DST): UTC-4 (EDT)
- ZIP codes: 33570, 33572
- Area codes: 813, 656
- FIPS code: 12-01675
- GNIS feature ID: 2402649

Apollo Beach is an unincorporated census-designated place in Hillsborough County, Florida, United States. As of the 2020 census, Apollo Beach had a population of 26,002.

== Geography ==
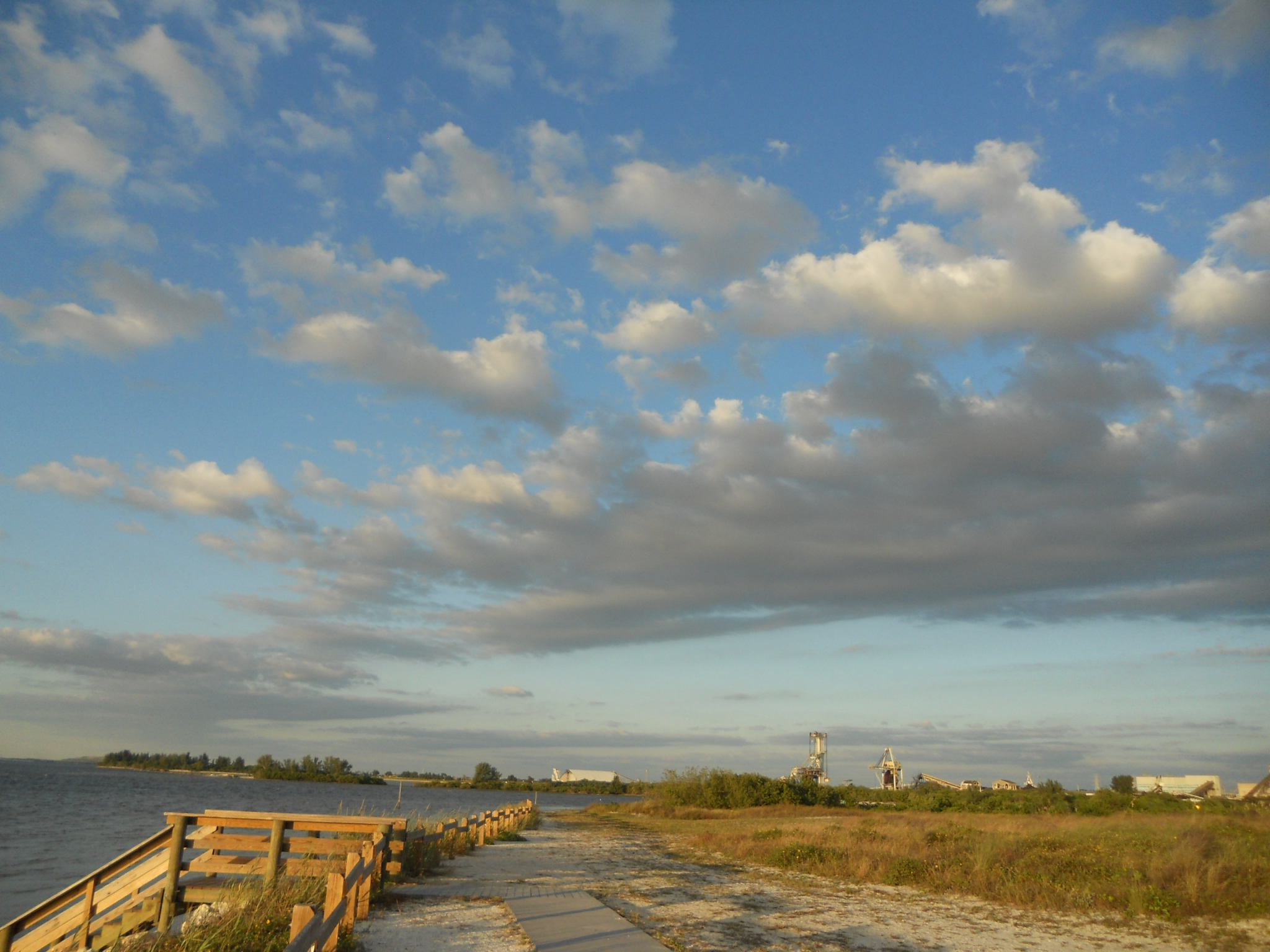
Apollo Beach

Apollo Beach is located in southern Hillsborough County and bordered to the north by Gibsonton, to the northeast by Riverview, to the east by Balm, to the southeast by Sun City Center, to the south by Ruskin, and to the west by Tampa Bay. The unincorporated community of North Ruskin is in the northern part of the CDP. U.S. Route 41 crosses the center of the CDP, and Interstate 75 passes through the eastern portion, with access from Exit 246 at the northern edge of the CDP. Downtown Tampa is 17 miles (27 km) to the north, and Bradenton is 25 miles (40 km) to the south.

According to the United States Census Bureau, Apollo Beach CDP has a total area of 22.3 square miles (57.7 km^{2}), of which 19.8 square miles (51.4 km^{2}) are land and 2.4 square miles (6.3 km^{2}), or 10.97%, are water.

=== Climate ===
The climate in this area is characterized by hot, humid summers and generally mild to cool winters. According to the Köppen Climate Classification system, Apollo Beach has a humid subtropical climate, abbreviated "Cfa" on climate maps.

== Demographics ==
Historical population
Census	Pop.	Note	%±
1970	1,042		—
1980	4,014		285.2%
1990	6,025		50.1%
2000	7,444		23.6%
2010	14,055		88.8%
2020	26,002		85.0%

=== Racial and ethnic composition ===
Apollo Beach CDP, Florida – Racial and ethnic composition Note: the US Census treats Hispanic/Latino as an ethnic category. This table excludes Latinos from the racial categories and assigns them to a separate category. Hispanics/Latinos may be of any race.
Race / Ethnicity (NH = Non-Hispanic)	Pop 2000	Pop 2010	Pop 2020	% 2000	% 2010	% 2020
White alone (NH)	6,631	10,869	16,910	89.08%	77.33%	65.03%
Black or African American alone (NH)	59	786	2,338	0.79%	5.59%	8.99%
Native American or Alaska Native alone (NH)	29	33	48	0.39%	0.23%	0.18%
Asian alone (NH)	104	354	844	1.40%	2.52%	3.25%
Native Hawaiian or Pacific Islander alone (NH)	0	5	21	0.00%	0.04%	0.08%
Other race alone (NH)	6	27	148	0.08%	0.19%	0.57%
Mixed race or Multiracial (NH)	62	201	1,200	0.83%	1.43%	4.62%
Hispanic or Latino (any race)	553	1,780	4,493	7.43%	12.66%	17.28%
Total	7,444	14,055	26,002	100.00%	100.00%	100.00%

=== 2020 census ===
As of the 2020 census, Apollo Beach had a population of 26,002. The median age was 44.8 years. 21.2% of residents were under the age of 18 and 19.7% of residents were 65 years of age or older. For every 100 females there were 97.9 males, and for every 100 females age 18 and over there were 95.2 males age 18 and over.

99.1% of residents lived in urban areas, while 0.9% lived in rural areas.

There were 10,067 households in Apollo Beach, of which 29.4% had children under the age of 18 living in them. Of all households, 63.6% were married-couple households, 12.1% were households with a male householder and no spouse or partner present, and 17.7% were households with a female householder and no spouse or partner present. About 18.6% of all households were made up of individuals and 9.1% had someone living alone who was 65 years of age or older.

There were 11,100 housing units, of which 9.3% were vacant. The homeowner vacancy rate was 3.7% and the rental vacancy rate was 7.7%.

Racial composition as of the 2020 census
Race	Number	Percent
White	17,947	69.0%
Black or African American	2,489	9.6%
American Indian and Alaska Native	83	0.3%
Asian	864	3.3%
Native Hawaiian and Other Pacific Islander	27	0.1%
Some other race	1,137	4.4%
Two or more races	3,455	13.3%

=== 2010 census ===
As of the 2010 census, there were 14,701 people in Apollo Beach and 5,886 households, an increase of nearly 75% in both categories over the 2000 census. New families came in with new construction, with the population of aged five years and under increasing by over 150%. The racial makeup of the community was 87% White, 6% African American, 0% Native American, 2% Asian, 3% from other races, and 2% from two or more races. Hispanic or Latino of any race were 14% of the population.

Of these households, 27% had children under the age of 18 living with them, and 63% were married couples living together, both higher than the state average.

== History ==
The history of Apollo Beach started in 1923 on land owned by the Dickman family, then used annually for farming and grazing pasture. Much of the land was mangrove and low-elevation and was considered uninhabitable.

In the 1930s, Paul Dickman conceived the idea of a waterfront community. He felt the location was ideally located equidistant between Tampa and Bradenton along U.S. Route 41.

The Dickmans secured the services of Radar Engineering of Miami to design a subdivision including roads, canals, schools, recreation areas, and community services.

In the early 1950s, Dickman negotiated the sale of the land to three men from New York: Turner, Dean and Clark. They named the land "Tampa Beach", believing the association with Tampa would attract interested persons more readily than a name which did not properly locate the area geographically.

Construction began on the Flamingo Canal near U.S. 41 and proceeded toward Fairway Boulevard. It was their intention to extend the canal to Tampa Bay so as to achieve access to open water. The task became too large for the amount of capital they had invested and for the abilities of the persons involved, and in 1956 they notified Dickman they could not go through with the project.

In 1957, Francis Corr, a retired businessman from Michigan, purchased the land. Corr renamed the area "La Vida Beach". Legend has it that in 1958 Corr's wife Dorothy suggested a new name, "Apollo Beach", for the area's greatest benefit — sunshine. Mr. Corr started construction of 50 homes in the area between U.S. 41 and Golf & Sea Boulevard.

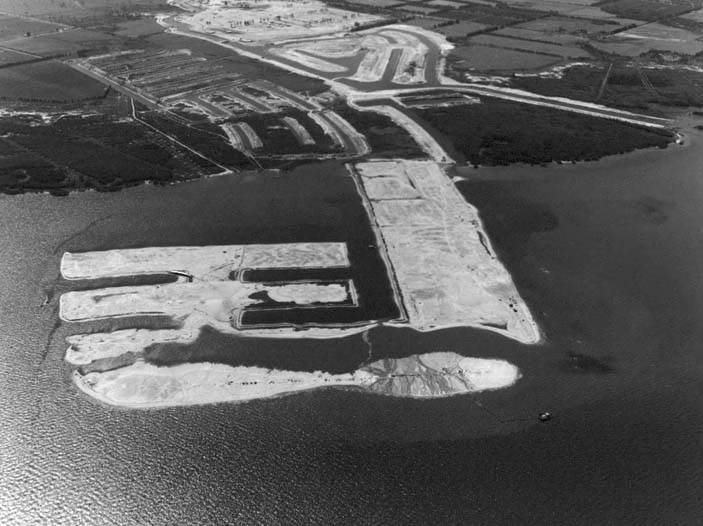
1959 Looking East towards Apollo Beach

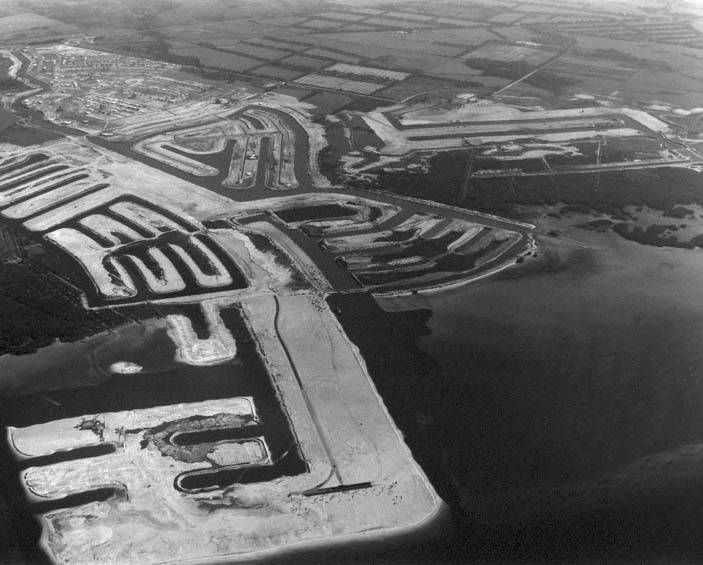
1959 Looking Southeast at Apollo Beach

In early 1958, Corr reached an agreement with Robert E. Lee, a South Carolina contractor, to join in the development. Lee was to continue the dredging of canals, and in exchange was to receive parcels of land.

In the early 1960s, Francis Corr sold his company and the Apollo Beach land to a Miami company known as Flora Sun Corporation. Flora Sun sold some of the land on the northern end to the Tampa Electric Company for a power plant site on the land's northern border, which is now the Big Bend Power Station. Flora Sun failed in its obligations in the purchase of the land from the Corr family, and about seven years later the family got the land back out of bankruptcy court.

In the mid-1960s, Corr's son Thomas moved his young family to the area to continue work on the Apollo Beach project; however, while the land was in bankruptcy proceedings from Flora Sun, the dredge and fill permits required to construct the canal system expired.

The Corr family continued to struggle with the development over the years, facing regulatory hurdles and tightening growth policy in Florida with the passage of the growth management act in 1972 and expanded policies in 1984.

Thomas Corr continued to develop the community and donated land for parks and schools and preserving hundreds of acres of mangrove swamps and environmental areas. He started a community bank, a chamber of commerce, civic clubs and festivals. Thomas Corr died in 1998. In 2006, Hillsborough County honored the work of Thomas Corr by naming the new elementary school on Big Bend Road the Thomas P. Corr Elementary School.

Today Apollo Beach is a waterfront community with year-round boating, fishing, and other water activities. The estimated 55 miles (89 km) of canals lead to Tampa Bay.

== Education ==
The schools that serve Apollo Beach are:

- Apollo Beach K - 8 School
- Inez Doby Elementary
- Waterset Charter School (K-8)
- Eisenhower Middle School
- East Bay High School
- Dorothy C. York Innovation Academy
- SLAM! Apollo Beach (K-12 as of January, 2026)

== Famous Landmark: Big Bend ==
Apollo Beach is famous for the Big Bend Power Station which provides power to the Tampa Bay area. The power plant is visible across Tampa Bay and especially in Apollo Beach.

== Notable people ==
- Nick Carter, singer-songwriter and actor grew up in Apollo Beach
- Debra Lafave, teacher who pleaded guilty to lewd or lascivious battery
- Tessa Ludwick, actress, attended first grade at Apollo Beach Elementary
