= Oak Grove School =

Oak Grove School may refer to:

in India

- Oak Grove School, Mussoorie

in the United States

(by state)

- Oak Grove School (Prairieville, Alabama), listed on the NRHP in Alabama
- Oak Grove Rosenwald School, Oak Grove, Arkansas, listed on the NRHP in Sevier County, Arkansas
- Oak Grove School (Oak Grove Community, Arkansas), listed on the NRHP in Grant County, Arkansas
- Oak Grove School (Ojai, California)
- Oak Grove School (Winston-Salem, North Carolina), listed on the NRHP in North Carolina
- Oak Grove School (Fargo, North Dakota)
- Oak Grove Schoolhouse (Hood River, Oregon), near Hood River, Oregon, listed on the NRHP in Hood River County, Oregon

== See also ==
- Oak Grove (disambiguation)
- Oak Grove High School (disambiguation)
- Oak Grove Elementary School (disambiguation)
- Oak Grove School District (disambiguation)
