= Samuel Leslie =

- Born: c. 1740
- Died: 1794 (aged 53-54)
- Military career
- Allegiance: (United Kingdom) Kingdom of Great Britain
- Branch: British Army
- Rank: Captain
- Conflicts: American Revolutionary War * Boston Massacre (witness) * Battle of Great Bridge * Burning of Norfolk

Samuel Leslie (c. 1740 – 1794) was a British military officer. He commanded the 14th Regiment of Foot during the American Revolutionary War and witnessed the Boston Massacre.

== Early service and Boston ==
Leslie was stationed in Boston, during the Boston Massacre. He provided a sworn affidavit about the events of the massacre.

== Revolutionary War ==
In late 1775, Leslie's regiment moved to the Colony of Virginia to support the royal governor, Lord Dunmore. As a senior officer, Leslie commanded raids along the local waterways to seize supplies.

On December 9, 1775, Leslie led a British force to attack Patriot earthworks at the Battle of Great Bridge. His regiment took heavy casualties, and Captain of the grenadier company Charles Fordyce was killed. Leslie then ordered a retreat back to Fort Murray. On January 1, 1776, Leslie took part in the Burning of Norfolk.

== Later life ==
Leslie survived the American Revolutionary War and moved back to Great Britain. He died there in 1794.

== See also ==
- 14th Regiment of Foot
