= Big Bend Power Station =

Coal-fired power plant in Apollo Beach, Florida

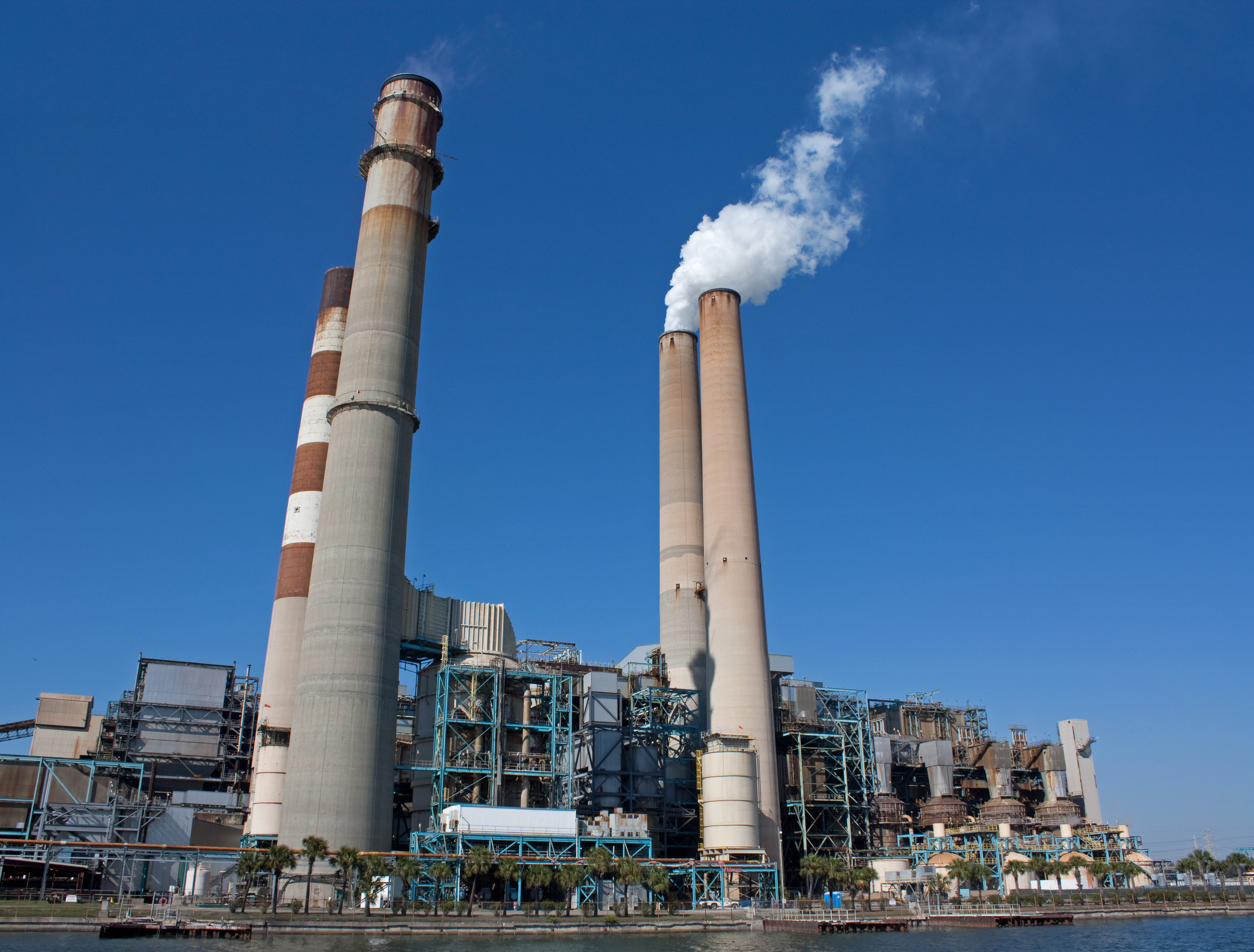
- Big Bend Power Station
- Location of the Big Bend Power Station in Florida
- Country: United States
- Location: Apollo Beach, Florida
- Coordinates: 27°47′45″N 82°24′13″W
- Status: Operational
- Commission date: 1969, last unit: 1985
- Owner: TECO Energy

Solar farm
- Type: Standard PV

Thermal power station
- Primary fuel: Bituminous coal
- Secondary fuel: Distillate fuel oil

Power generation
- Nameplate capacity: 1,892 MW

External links
- Commons: Related media on Commons

Big Bend Power Station is a major coal-fired power plant, located across Tampa Bay from Tampa, Florida, United States, on nearly 1,500 acres (6 km^{2}) in southwestern Hillsborough County, close to Apollo Beach. It is owned and operated by TECO Energy. Three similar units (each 445.5 MWe nameplate capacity) were launched in the early 1970s, followed by a newer 486-MWe unit 4 in 1985.

== Flue-gas desulfurization ==
The scrubber for Unit 4 began operation in 1984, and since 1995, has simultaneously scrubbed Unit 3 as well. The scrubber for Units 1 and 2 began operation at the end of 1999. According to TECO Energy, the scrubber system removes 95% of sulfur dioxide from all four units.

== Manatees ==
During the winter months, warm-water outfalls from the station draw dozens of West Indian manatees, an endangered species, to the immediate vicinity of the plant. In 1986, TECO set aside a manatee viewing area which is accessible to the public.

== Upgrade to Big Bend Unit 1 and retirement of Unit 2 ==
In 2018, Tampa Electric announced several major upgrades for Big Bend Power Station. The company modernized Unit 1 to use natural gas combined-cycle technology in 2023, which enabled the unit to generate 1,090 MW while eliminating coal as a fuel source. Big Bend Unit 2 was retired in 2021 after nearly 50 years of service. This upgrade gave Tampa Electric a 2023 generation portfolio of 75 percent natural gas, 12 percent coal, about 7 percent solar, and about 6 percent other sources. The clean, warm-water discharge at the station that provides a sanctuary for manatees at the adjacent Manatee Viewing Center remained.

== Solar power ==
Directly to the southeast of Big Bend Power Station, Tampa Electric’s 23 MW photovoltaic array features more than 200,000 thin-film solar panels. Built on 106 acres of company-owned land, the solar array was the largest of its kind in the Tampa Bay area when it was completed in 2017. This was part of the company’s large-scale solar power initiative that calls for a total of 600 MW of new solar power to be operational at photovoltaic sites around the Tampa Bay area by 2023. TECO has also built a 1 MW floating solar array on a pond at the plant.

== Accident ==
On 29 June 2017, molten slag from a coal boiler killed 5 and injured 1. Safety rules were ignored as they tried to clear a blockage. The blockage burst and rained down molten slag upon them.

== See also ==
- List of power stations in Florida
- List of largest power stations in the United States
