= Oakland Park Elementary School =

U.S. historic place in Florida

- U.S. National Register of Historic Places
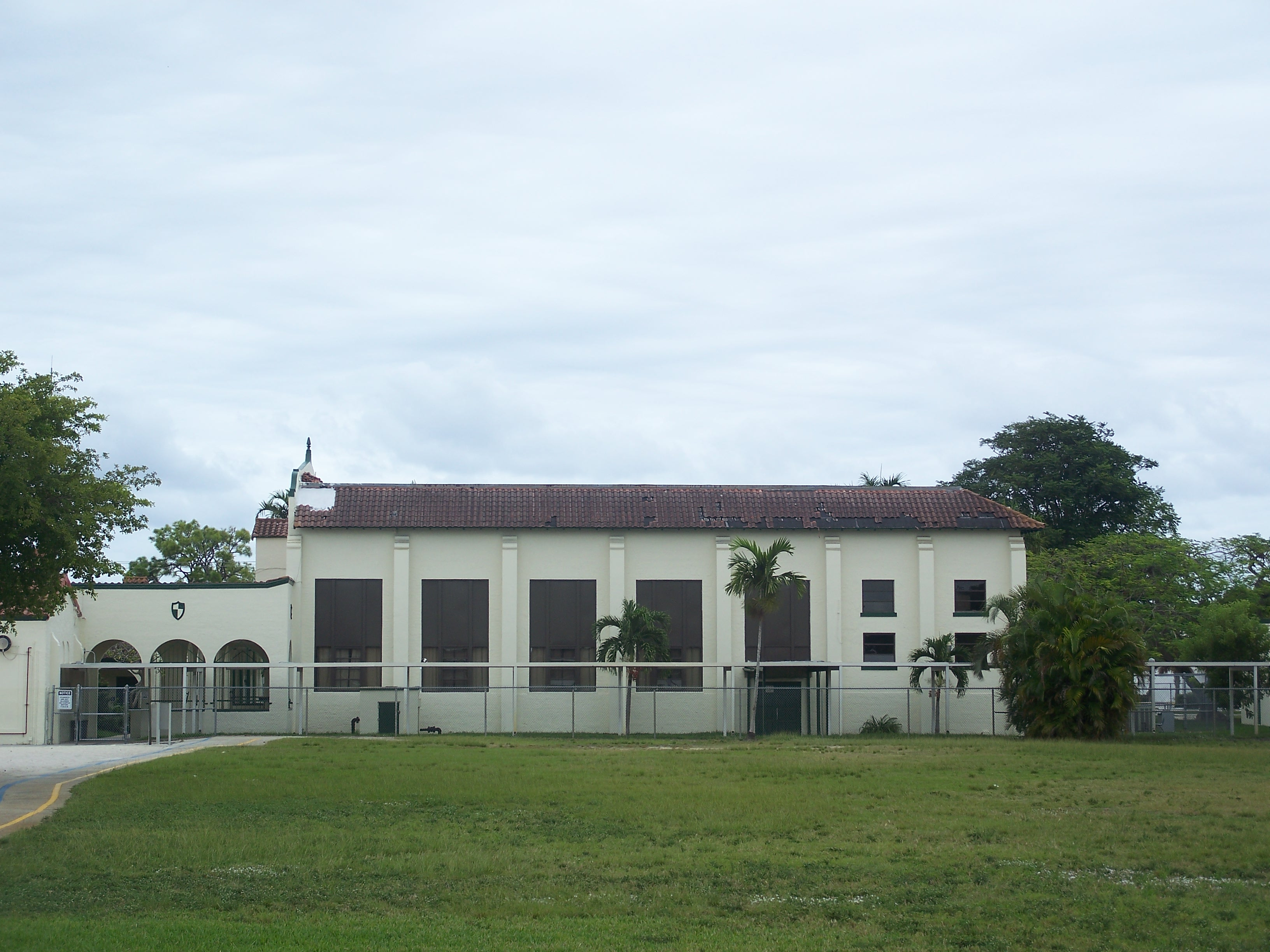
- Home of the Eagles

- Location within Florida Location within the United States
- Location: Oakland Park, Florida
- Coordinates: 26°10′05″N 80°08′06″W
- Built by: Frank Norton: Charles Mills
- Architect: Thomas D. McLaughlin
- Architectural style: Mission/Spanish Revival
- NRHP reference No.: 88000714
- Added to NRHP: 9 June 1988

The Oakland Park Elementary School is a historic school in Oakland Park, Florida, United States. The school, part of Broward County Public Schools, is located at 936 Northeast 33rd Street. On June 9, 1988, it was added to the U.S. National Register of Historic Places. The mascot of the school is an eagle. Grades are Pre-K, K, 1st, 2nd, 3rd, 4th, and 5th. There are English for Speakers of Other Languages students in this school who typically natively speak Spanish or Creole.

== History ==
The school was built in 1926 before the city was incorporated as Oakland Park (1929) when it was Floranada. Local residents sheltered in the school during hurricanes. It was expanded in 1949 with the addition of three rooms. It is the oldest Broward County school in continuous use. In 1951 the school had 275 students. In 1988 enrollment was 458.

== Layout ==
The main classroom building, built in 1926 is U-shaped and has arcaded walkways and an open courtyard. The vaulted rectangular two story auditorium was built in 1927.
