= Twin Lakes (Fort Lauderdale) =

- Neighborhood
- Location within Florida Location within the United States
- Coordinates: 26°10′58″N 80°9′33″W
- Country: United States
- State: Florida
- County: Broward

Area
  - Total: 0.27 sq mi (0.7 km^{2})
  - Land: 0.27 sq mi (0.7 km^{2})
  - Water: 0 sq mi (0.0 km^{2})
- Elevation: 3.3 ft (1 m)

Population (2000)
  - Total: 1,875
  - Density: 7,211/sq mi (2,784.2/km^{2})
- Time zone: UTC-5 (Eastern (EST))
  - Summer (DST): UTC-4 (EDT)
- FIPS code: 12-72812
- GNIS feature ID: 0301155

Twin Lakes was a census-designated place (CDP) in Broward County, Florida, United States, which was divided into Twin Lakes North and Twin Lakes South. The population was 1,875 at the 2000 census.

On November 2, 2004, residents of the Twin Lakes North voted to join the City of Fort Lauderdale. The annexation became effective on September 15, 2005, and it now serves as a Fort Lauderdale neighborhood. Twin Lakes South became a neighborhood of Oakland Park, Florida in 2005.

== Geography ==
Twin Lakes is located at 26°10′58″N 80°9′33″W (26.182661, -80.159252).

According to the United States Census Bureau, the CDP has a total area of 0.7 km^{2} (0.27 sq mi). 0.7 km^{2} (0.27 sq mi) of it is land and 3.70% is water.

== Demographics ==
As of the census of 2000, there were 1,875 people, 656 households, and 446 families residing in the CDP. The population density was 2,784.4 people/km^{2} (7,212 people/mi^{2}). There were 680 housing units at an average density of 1,009.8 units/km^{2} (2,615 units/mi^{2}). The racial makeup of the CDP was 79.47% White (66.6% were Non-Hispanic White,) 13.87% African American, 0.37% Native American, 1.76% Asian, 2.51% from other races, and 2.03% from two or more races. Hispanic or Latino of any race were 16.11% of the population.

There were 656 households, out of which 35.4% had children under the age of 18 living with them, 49.7% were married couples living together, 12.0% had a female householder with no husband present, and 31.9% were non-families. 18.1% of all households were made up of individuals, and 4.1% had someone living alone who was 65 years of age or older. The average household size was 2.86 and the average family size was 3.24.

In the CDP, the population was spread out, with 25.0% under the age of 18, 6.0% from 18 to 24, 37.4% from 25 to 44, 23.0% from 45 to 64, and 8.5% who were 65 years of age or older. The median age was 37 years. For every 100 females, there were 114.3 males. For every 100 females age 18 and over, there were 121.4 males.

The median income for a household in the CDP was $40,433, and the median income for a family was $42,431. Males had a median income of $31,622 versus $21,889 for females. The per capita income for the CDP was $19,284. About 2.4% of families and 8.9% of the population were below the poverty line, including 7.0% of those under age 18 and 3.0% of those age 65 or over.

As of 2000, English was the first language of 79.59% of residents, while Spanish was at 14.62%, and French Creole as a mother tongue made up 5.78% of the population.

== See also ==
City of Oakland Park
