= Oak Grove Township =

Oak Grove Township may refer to one of the following places in the United States:

- Oak Grove Township, Lonoke County, Arkansas
- Oak Grove Township, Benton County, Indiana
- Oak Grove Township, Durham County, North Carolina
- Oak Grove Township, Anoka County, Minnesota, now the city of Oak Grove
