= Great Bridge, Virginia =

Great Bridge
- Community
- Location within the state of Virginia Great Bridge (the United States)
- Coordinates: 36°42′50″N 76°14′20″W
- Country: United States
- State: Virginia
- Independent city: Chesapeake
- Time zone: UTC−5 (Eastern (EST))
  - Summer (DST): UTC−4 (EDT)

Great Bridge is a community located in the independent city of Chesapeake in the U.S. state of Virginia. Its name is derived from the American Revolutionary War Battle of Great Bridge, which took place on December 9, 1775, and resulted in the final removal of British government from the Colony and Dominion of Virginia.

The main branch of the Chesapeake Public Library named the Central Library, which itself is located in Great Bridge, displays a 12-pound cannonball, labeled as having been fired at the Battle of Great Bridge. The written histories of the battle are specific in stating that there were only two cannon at the battle, both British "four pounders."

Though the battles of Lexington and Concord took place months earlier, and are historically more memorable, the Battle of Great Bridge can be seen as the first strategically important colonial victory over the British, forcing Lord Dunmore's 200 redcoats to evacuate Fort Murray and withdraw to Norfolk.

The city hall as well as other major municipal buildings for Chesapeake lie within Great Bridge. Great Bridge was essentially a small town or crossroads until the late 1980s and 1990s, when it experienced significant growth. It contains large residential areas as well as many large shopping centers. Also, Great Bridge was the home of professional baseball players, Michael Cuddyer, David Wright, B.J. Upton, and Justin Upton. Former Virginia Tech, Denver Broncos, and Cleveland Browns defensive lineman Carlton Powell also hails from Great Bridge. Lawrence Johnson, the 2000 Summer Olympics pole vault silver medalist, is also from Great Bridge. Other local notable celebrities include Larry Bergman who in the 1956 Olympics in Melbourne, Australia won a gold medal in fencing and Thompson Mann, who won a gold medal for swimming in the 1964 Summer Olympics in Tokyo, Japan.

== Schools ==
- Great Bridge High School is known for its high school wrestling.

== Religion ==
Great Bridge is home to Oak Grove United Methodist Church. It is also home to Great Bridge Baptist Church. Many large funerals, especially for fallen first responders have been held there because of their 1500 seat capacity. They perform a community wide Christmas program every year that draws crowds from all around the area.

== See also ==
- Chesapeake, Virginia
- Borough (Virginia)
