= Oit Ihuk, Arizona =

- Populated place
- Location within the state of Arizona Oit Ihuk (the United States)
- Coordinates: 32°18′56″N 112°14′44″W
- Country: United States
- State: Arizona
- County: Pima
- Elevation: 2,126 ft (648 m)
- Time zone: UTC-7 (Mountain (MST))
  - Summer (DST): UTC-7 (MST)
- Area code: 520
- FIPS code: 04-50795
- GNIS feature ID: 32483

Oit Ihuk is a temporary and populated village in the Gu Achi district of the Papago Indian Reservation in Pima County, Arizona, United States. It has an estimated elevation of 2,126 feet (648 m) above sea level. It is situated close to the hamlets Komak Wuacho and Ventana.

== Origin ==
The name "Oit Ihuk" means "devil's claw field".
