= North Ruskin, Florida =

Unincorporated community in Florida, US

- Unincorporated community
- Location within Florida Location within the United States
- Coordinates: 27°45′54″N 82°23′42″W
- Country: United States
- State: Florida
- County: Hillsborough
- Time zone: UTC-5 (Eastern (EST))
  - Summer (DST): UTC-4 (EDT)
- ZIP code: 33572
- Area code: 813
- GNIS feature ID: 287863

North Ruskin is an unincorporated community located in southeastern Hillsborough County, Florida, United States, north of Ruskin. It is part of the census-designated place of Apollo Beach.

== Education ==
The community of North Ruskin is served by Hillsborough County Schools, which serves the entire county.
