= North Andrews Gardens, Florida =

- neighborhood
- Interactive map of North Andrews Gardens, Florida
- Coordinates: 26°11′29″N 80°8′40″W
- Country: United States
- State: Florida
- County: Broward

Area
  - Total: 1.1 sq mi (2.8 km^{2})
  - Land: 1.1 sq mi (2.8 km^{2})
  - Water: 0 sq mi (0.0 km^{2})
- Elevation: 6.6 ft (2 m)

Population (2000)
  - Total: 9,656
  - Density: 8,883/sq mi (3,429.8/km^{2})
- Time zone: UTC-5 (Eastern (EST))
  - Summer (DST): UTC-4 (EDT)
- FIPS code: 12-49150
- GNIS feature ID: 1867178

North Andrews Gardens was a census-designated place (CDP) in Broward County, Florida, United States. The population was 9,656 at the 2000 census. It is now annexed to Oakland Park, Florida.

== Geography ==
North Andrews Gardens is located at 26°11′29″N 80°8′40″W (26.191461, -80.144341).

According to the United States Census Bureau, the CDP had a total area of 2.8 square kilometres (1.1 sq mi), all land.

== Demographics ==
At the 2000 census, of 2000, there were 9,656 people, 3,518 households and 2,409 families residing in the CDP. The population density was 3,420.4 per square kilometre (8,859/sq mi). There were 3,645 housing units at an average density of 1,291.1 per square kilometre (3,344/sq mi). The racial make-up of the CDP was 84.00% White (63.7% were Non-Hispanic White,) 4.83% African American, 0.37% Native American, 1.44% Asian, 0.03% Pacific Islander, 5.58% from other races and 3.75% from two or more races. Hispanic or Latino of any race were 27.78% of the population.

There were 3,518 households, of which 36.7% had children under the age of 18 living with them, 49.1% were married couples living together, 13.6% had a female householder with no husband present, and 31.5% were non-families. 22.3% of all households were made up of individuals, and 6.7% had someone living alone who was 65 years of age or older. The average household size was 2.74 and the average family size was 3.24.

26.3% of the population were under the age of 18, 6.6% from 18 to 24, 35.6% from 25 to 44, 21.8% from 45 to 6, and 9.8% 65 years of age or older. The median age was 36 years. For every 100 females, there were 104.3 males. For every 100 females age 18 and over, there were 101.1 males.

The median household income was $41,675 and the median family income was $44,231. Males had a median income of $31,523 and females $25,469. The per capita income was $16,951. About 5.8% of families and 8.6% of the population were below the poverty line, including 11.4% of those under age 18 and 4.5% of those age 65 or over.

In 2000, the North Andrews Gardens section of Oakland Park was the sixty-third most Cuban-populated area in the US at 5.76%, and the rest of Oakland Park had the 113th highest percentage of Cubans with 2.03% of all residents. The North Andrews Gardens section was also the thirty-third most Peruvian-populated area in the US, at 1.51% of the population, as well as having the seventy-fourth highest percentage of Colombians in the US, at 2.03% of all residents.
