= Oak Grove United Methodist Church =

Methodist church in Chesapeake, Virginia, U.S.

Coordinates: 36.733398°N 76.241181°W

Oak Grove United Methodist Church is located in Chesapeake, Virginia, and is known as "the mother of all Methodist congregations in Hampton Roads". It has helped found four other Methodist churches in the area: Community United Methodist, Great Bridge United Methodist, Messiah United Methodist, and Oaklette United Methodist It is located on the corner of North Battlefield and Great Bridge boulevards, and was the fourth Methodist church established in the Northampton County. The church's history dates back to the 1700s, and since then the church has established a wide variety of ministries and has been declared a historical structure. The church follows Methodism, a movement started by John Wesley in an effort to reform the Church of England from within.

== History ==
The Cutherell family were the first Methodists in Tidewater Virginia. In 1770, one member of the Cutherell family, Daniel Cutherell, allowed his friends and relatives into his home so that they could pray and sing together in praise. Reverend Francis Asbury, the first American bishop of the Methodist Church, preached at Cutherell's house in 1800. In 1804, Bennet and Jinny Armstrong sold one half-acre lot of land for a place of worship to be built upon, and in 1808, a building for the new Cutherell Meeting House was constructed there.

In 1840, the Cutherell Meeting House became a Methodist charge on a preaching circuit.

In 1842, the building was lifted and moved on rollers with the use of mules to the intersection of Kempsville Road and Battlefield Boulevard. Ten years later, the name of the church was changed from Cutherell's Meeting House to Oak Grove Church, largely due to the grove of oak trees surrounding the location.

Norfolk and Portsmouth experienced a yellow fever epidemic in 1855, sometimes referred to as the "Upshur fever," that originated from the steamer Benjamin Franklin, and a temporary Oak Grove hospital was constructed so that church members could aid the community during that time.

Volunteer companies of Virginia soldiers held drills and parades at the Oak Grove Church in 1861, and the Sixth Regiment of Virginia Volunteers was temporarily stationed on the church grounds.

In 1862, Federal troops set up occupation and were stationed in most of the Hampton Roads area. Oak Grove Church was occupied from then until after the end of the Civil War in 1865. The interior was destroyed by the troops as they used the furniture and the surrounding grove of trees for firewood.

In 1868, Oak Grove became a part of the East Norfolk Circuit.

Three acres next to the church were bought in 1871, expanding the church's grounds.

The church became a part of the South Norfolk Circuit in 1873.

In 1890, Oak Grove was reimbursed by the United States government for damage done to the church and the surrounding trees during the Union Army's occupation of the building in the 1860s.

In 1935, a church school was added to the sanctuary, and a fellowship hall was constructed in 1950.

In 1976, the Oak Grove Church sanctuary was designated a "Historical Structure".

A new building for the church finished construction and was opened in 2007.

=== Historical significance ===
Oak Grove United Methodist Church finds its roots in the family of the first Methodists in the Tidewater area, and has served to help establish multiple other churches within the area.

The church has also served as a place for the volunteer companies of Virginia soldiers to hold drills and parades on, and has served as a building of occupation for the Union army. Before the Union army took hold of the structure, it functioned as a hospital for Confederate soldiers. Members of the church, including a mix of youth and adults, have helped to refurbish an orphanage in Costa Rica.

== Ministries ==
The church hosts a variety of ministries.

=== Adult ministries ===
The adult ministries include different small groups, such as the Golden Oaks and the United Methodist Women. The United Methodist Men, a small group for the men of the church, promote fellowship and spiritual growth.

=== Children's ministries ===
Children's ministries include childcare, preschool, a Sunday school class for preschoolers and kindergartners called "Critterland," and a Sunday school class for first through fifth graders called "The Treehouse".

=== Evangelism ministries ===
The evangelism ministries include Sunday servant teams, greeter ministries, usher ministries, hospitality station hosts, information desk hosts, and welcome gift deliverers.

=== Mission ministries ===
The Angel Tree is a program that allows members of the church to pick tags dedicated to specific children off of a Christmas tree and to bring a gift for that child back to the church, where other members will deliver it. C.A.S.T., the Chesapeake Area Shelter Team, allows members to donate items, food, or time to the homeless for a set week during the year. The church sends a check to the VA Methodist Annual Conference every year to help fund different projects, missions, and programs. The Chesapeake Care Free Clinic is a facility that is gives free medical and dental care to families that struggle to afford health insurance, and the church donates an annual check to help keep the clinic running. Oak Grove also gives a yearly check to the Chesapeake Jail Ministry, which provides counseling and Bible studies for inmates within the Chesapeake Prison System.

A Chesapeake Point-in-Time Homeless Count is conducted biennially to count the number of homeless individuals in Chesapeake to determine the main causes of homelessness in the area, and Oak Grove partners with the program by having church members donate various items needed by those individuals. Senior high youth and adult leaders also often travel for a week long mission trip in Alajuela, Costa Rica, partnering with Strong Missions. A community dinner is held once a week at Oak Grove to serve families with low-income.

Heart Havens provides a safe environment for adults with intellectual disabilities to live in, and the church regularly donates and volunteers within the community. Oak Grove serves a partnership with the Heart of Compassion Partnerships, an outreach program for the area. Paint Your Heart Out is an event sponsored by the Chesapeake Rotary Club that Oak Grove regularly participates in.

The church also helps with many other ministries, including Chesapeake Serve the City, communion fund, disaster shelter team, faith works, Gideons, Great Bridge Food closet, House of Blessings Food Pantry, Meals on Wheels, missionary support, N.E.S.T., Park Place Soup Kitchen, Plant a Row, Project Homeless Connect, Providence Mobile Home Park, Red Cross Bloodmobile, and the Samaritan Fund.

=== Scouting ministries ===
Scouting ministries include Cub Scouts, Boy Scouts, and Girl Scouts.

=== Youth ministries ===
Youth ministries include lounge and gym nights, youth small groups, confirmation class, and youth mission trips.
