= Oak Grove High School =

Oak Grove High School can refer to:

- Oak Grove High School (Jefferson County, Alabama)
- Oak Grove High School (Pulaski County, Arkansas)
- Oak Grove High School (San Jose, California)
- Oak Grove High School (Louisiana), in Oak Grove, West Carroll Parish, Louisiana
- Oak Grove High School (Hattiesburg, Mississippi)
- Oak Grove High School (North Carolina)

== See also ==
- Grove High School (disambiguation)
- Oak Grove School (disambiguation)
