= Oak Grove Farm =

Historic house in Massachusetts, United States

- U.S. National Register of Historic Places
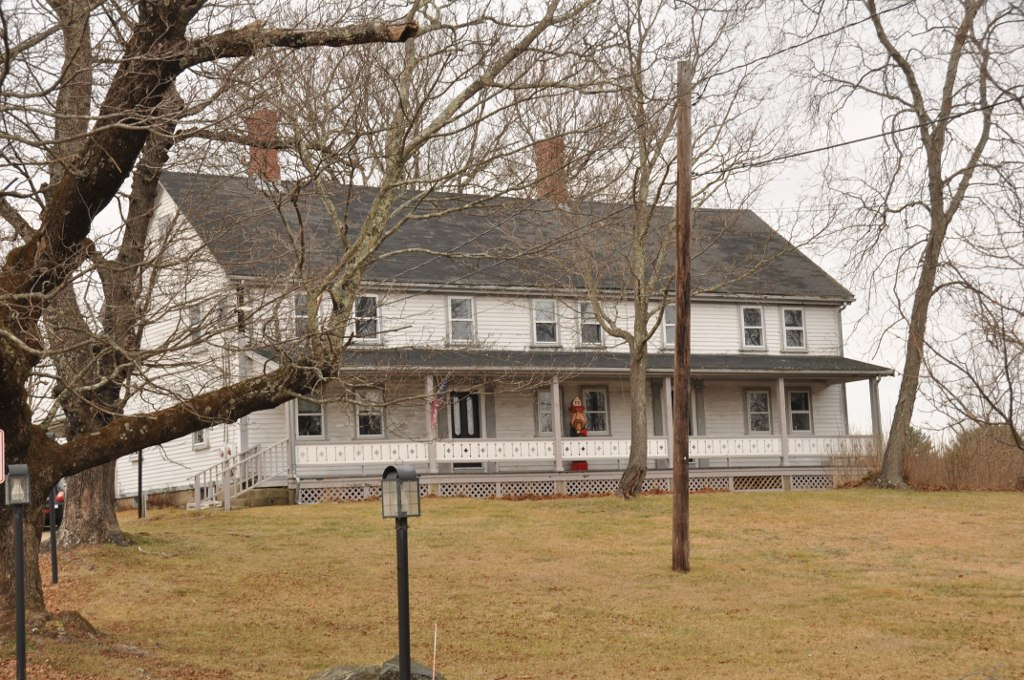

- Location within Massachusetts Location within the United States
- Location: 410 Exchange Street, Millis, Massachusetts
- Coordinates: 42°10′52″N 71°21′46″W
- Area: 108 acres (44 ha)
- Built: early 18th century
- Architectural style: Colonial
- NRHP reference No.: 11000247
- Added to NRHP: May 4, 2011

Oak Grove Farm is a historic First Period farmstead in Millis, Massachusetts. The 2 1/2-story wood-frame farmhouse was probably built in three phases, the first of which was in the early 18th century. Around this time, the left five bays of the house were built, as was a central chimney. In the second quarter of the 19th century, three bays were added to the right, giving the building its current asymmetrical eight-bay facade. Finally, in 1884 a series of modifications and additions were made. The central chimney was removed, a leanto section was added to the rear of the house, and the front porch was added. A second porch was also built onto the rear ell around this time.

The land on which the farmhouse stands has been farmed by English settlers since at least 1677, when Josiah Rockwood (also sometimes referred to as "Rockett") owned the property. Although maps show a house at the site in 1713, there is no other documentary evidence of the house until 1783, when a deed transferring the farm, with house, was recorded. For much of the 19th century the farm was owned by the Lovell family; it was purchased by Lansing Millis (the namesake of the town) in 1879. Millis, a railroad executive, established a dairy farm on the property, and gave it the name "Oak Grove Farm". His family used the property as a summer residence until 1883, after which he converted the house into a boarding house for the farm workers. By 1893 (after Millis' death) the farm was reported to be the largest dairy farm in New England.

In the 20th century the property changed hands a few times, but remained in use as a dairy farm. In 1984, with a sale planned to a developer, the town purchased the property as one of the last open spaces near the town center. The farmland has been converted for use as recreational facilities, and the house has been restored and is managed by the town as a rental property.

The farm was listed on the National Register of Historic Places in 2011.

== See also ==
- National Register of Historic Places listings in Norfolk County, Massachusetts
- List of the oldest buildings in Massachusetts
