= Olberg, Arizona =

- Populated place
- Location within the state of Arizona Olberg (the United States)
- Coordinates: 33°05′32″N 111°41′10″W
- Country: United States
- State: Arizona
- County: Pinal
- Elevation: 1,309 ft (399 m)
- Time zone: UTC-7 (Mountain (MST))
  - Summer (DST): UTC-7 (MST)
- Area code: 520
- FIPS code: 04-50830
- GNIS feature ID: 24543

Olberg is a populated place situated in Pinal County, Arizona, United States. The settlement was founded in 1903, and named after Colonel C.R. Olberg, the chief engineer of the Bureau of Indian Affairs (BIA), and as such supervised the construction of the Coolidge Dam which was built by the BIA. It has an estimated elevation of 1,309 feet (399 m) above sea level.
