= Oak Grove, Arkansas =

Oak Grove, Arkansas may refer to one of the following places in the US state of Arkansas:

- Oak Grove, Carroll County, Arkansas
- Oak Grove, Cleveland County, Arkansas
- Oak Grove, Crawford County, Arkansas
- Oak Grove, Hot Spring County, Arkansas
- Oak Grove, Lonoke County, Arkansas
- Oak Grove, Nevada County, Arkansas
- Oak Grove, Pope County, Arkansas
- Oak Grove, Pulaski County, Arkansas
- Oak Grove, Sevier County, Arkansas
- Oak Grove, Washington County, Arkansas

or

- Oakgrove, Carroll County, Arkansas
- Oakgrove, Perry County, Arkansas
- Oak Grove Heights, Arkansas
