= Oak Grove Cemetery =

Oak Grove Cemetery may refer to:

- Oak Grove Cemetery (Conway, Arkansas); listed on the US National Register of Historic Places (NRHP)
- Oak Grove Cemetery (Des Arc, Arkansas); NRHP-listed
- Oak Grove Cemetery (Americus, Georgia); NRHP-listed as a contributing property
- Oak Grove Cemetery (Jerseyville, Illinois)
- Oak Grove Cemetery (Bath, Maine)
- Oak Grove Cemetery (Fall River, Massachusetts); NRHP-listed
- Oak Grove Cemetery (Falmouth, Massachusetts); NRHP-listed
- Oak Grove Cemetery (Gloucester, Massachusetts); NRHP-listed
- Oak Grove Cemetery (New Bedford, Massachusetts); NRHP-listed
- Oak Grove Cemetery (Lexington, Virginia)

== See also ==
- Oak Grove-Freedman's Cemetery, Salisbury, North Carolina, listed on the NRHP
