= East Bay High School =

Location
- 7710 Old Big Bend Road; Gibsonton, Florida 33534; United States; 27°47′38″N 82°21′48″W

Information
- Type: Public high school
- Motto: Aiming for Excellence!
- Established: 1957
- School district: Hillsborough County Public Schools
- Principal: Amy Stevens-Cox
- Teaching staff: 90.50 (FTE)
- Grades: 9–12
- Enrollment: 1,891 (2023–2024)
- Student to teacher ratio: 20.90
- Colors: Red and Grey
- Nickname: Indians
- Accreditation: Florida State Department of Education
- Website: www.hillsboroughschools.org/o/eastbay

East Bay High School is a public high school in Gibsonton, Florida, United States. It was chartered in 1957 on Big Bend Road in Gibsonton. The school's current facility was established in 1972 on a new campus adjacent to the east of the old one. Its former campus is now the campus of Eisenhower Middle School.

== Demographics ==
East Bay High ethnic enrollment
Race	2022-2023		2023-2024		2024-2025	
Hispanic or Latino	709	35.72%	696	37.24%	664	38.29%
White (NH)	601	30.28%	536	28.68%	479	27.62%
Black (NH)	519	26.15%	504	26.97%	478	27.57%
Mixed/Multi-Racial (NH)	116	5.84%	101	5.40%	80	4.61%
Asian (NH)	31	1.56%	26	1.39%	27	1.56%
Native American (NH)	9	0.45%	6	0.32%	6	0.35%
Total	1,985	100.00%	1,869	100.00%	1,734	100.00%
