= Old Leupp, Arizona =

Populated place in Coconino County, Arizona, US

- Populated place
- Location within the state of Arizona Old Leupp (the United States)
- Coordinates: 35°17′02″N 110°57′55″W
- Country: United States
- State: Arizona
- County: Coconino
- Elevation: 4,701 ft (1,433 m)
- Time zone: UTC-7 (Mountain (MST))
  - Summer (DST): UTC-7 (MST)
- Area code: 928
- GNIS feature ID: 6981

Old Leupp is a populated place situated in Coconino County, Arizona, United States. It has an estimated elevation of 4,701 feet (1,433 m) above sea level.
