= Oak Grove, Northumberland County, Virginia =

Unincorporated community in Virginia, US

Coordinates: 37°50′31″N 76°25′25″W

Oak Grove is an unincorporated community in Northumberland County, in the U.S. state of Virginia.
