= Oak Grove, Mercer County, West Virginia =

Oak Grove, West Virginia
- Unincorporated community
- Location within the state of West Virginia Oak Grove, West Virginia (the United States)
- Coordinates: 37°23′14″N 81°03′48″W
- Country: United States
- State: West Virginia
- County: Mercer
- Elevation: 2,598 ft (792 m)
- Time zone: UTC-5 (Eastern (EST))
  - Summer (DST): UTC-4 (EDT)
- Area codes: 304 & 681
- GNIS feature ID: 1555251

Oak Grove is an unincorporated community in Mercer County, West Virginia, United States. Oak Grove is 2.6 miles (4.2 km) east-northeast of Princeton.
