= Oak Grove Township, Durham County, North Carolina =

Township in Durham County, North Carolina, U.S.

Coordinates: 36°00′03″N 78°49′43″W

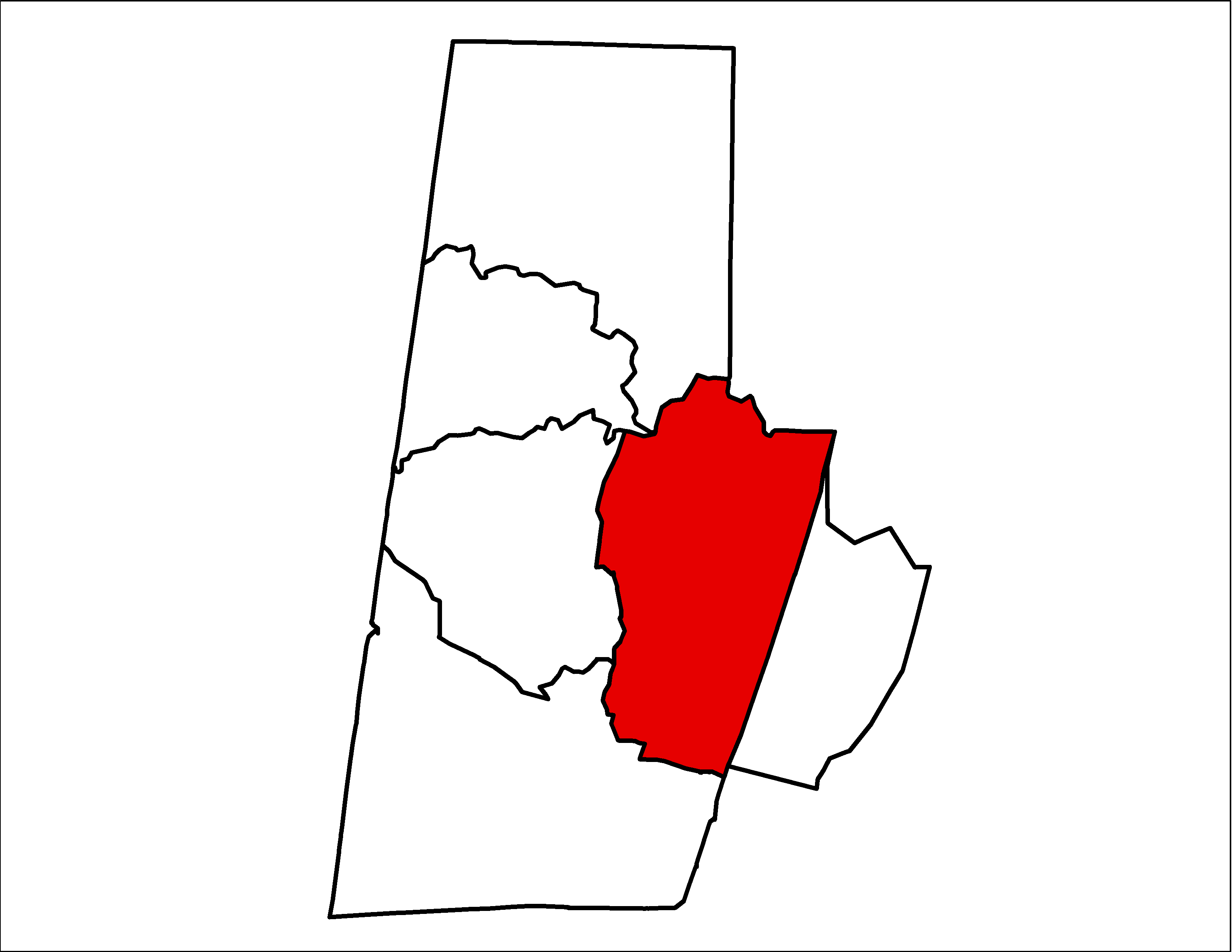
Location of Oak Grove Township in Durham County, N.C.

Oak Grove Township is one of six townships in Durham County, North Carolina, United States. The township had a population of 27,569 according to the 2000 census.

Oak Grove Township occupies 53.97 square miles (139.8 km^{2}) in central Durham County. The township contains portions of the city of Durham, as well as the unincorporated communities of Gorman and Oak Grove.
