= Oak Grove, Durham County, North Carolina =

- Unincorporated community
- Location within the state of North Carolina
- Coordinates: 35°58′54″N 78°49′14″W
- Country: United States
- State: North Carolina
- County: Durham
- Time zone: UTC-5 (Eastern (EST))
  - Summer (DST): UTC-4 (EDT)
- GNIS feature ID: 991350

Oak Grove is an unincorporated community in Durham County, North Carolina, United States, off North Carolina Highway 98.
