= Oak Grove, Okaloosa County, Florida =

Oak Grove, Florida
- Unincorporated community
- Location within Florida
- Coordinates: 30°55′30″N 86°34′03″W
- Country: United States
- State: Florida
- County: Okaloosa
- Elevation: 157 ft (48 m)
- Time zone: UTC-6 (Central (CST))
  - Summer (DST): UTC-5 (CDT)
- Area code: 850
- GNIS feature ID: 306132

Oak Grove is an unincorporated community in Okaloosa County, United States.
