= Oakland Park, Florida =

- City
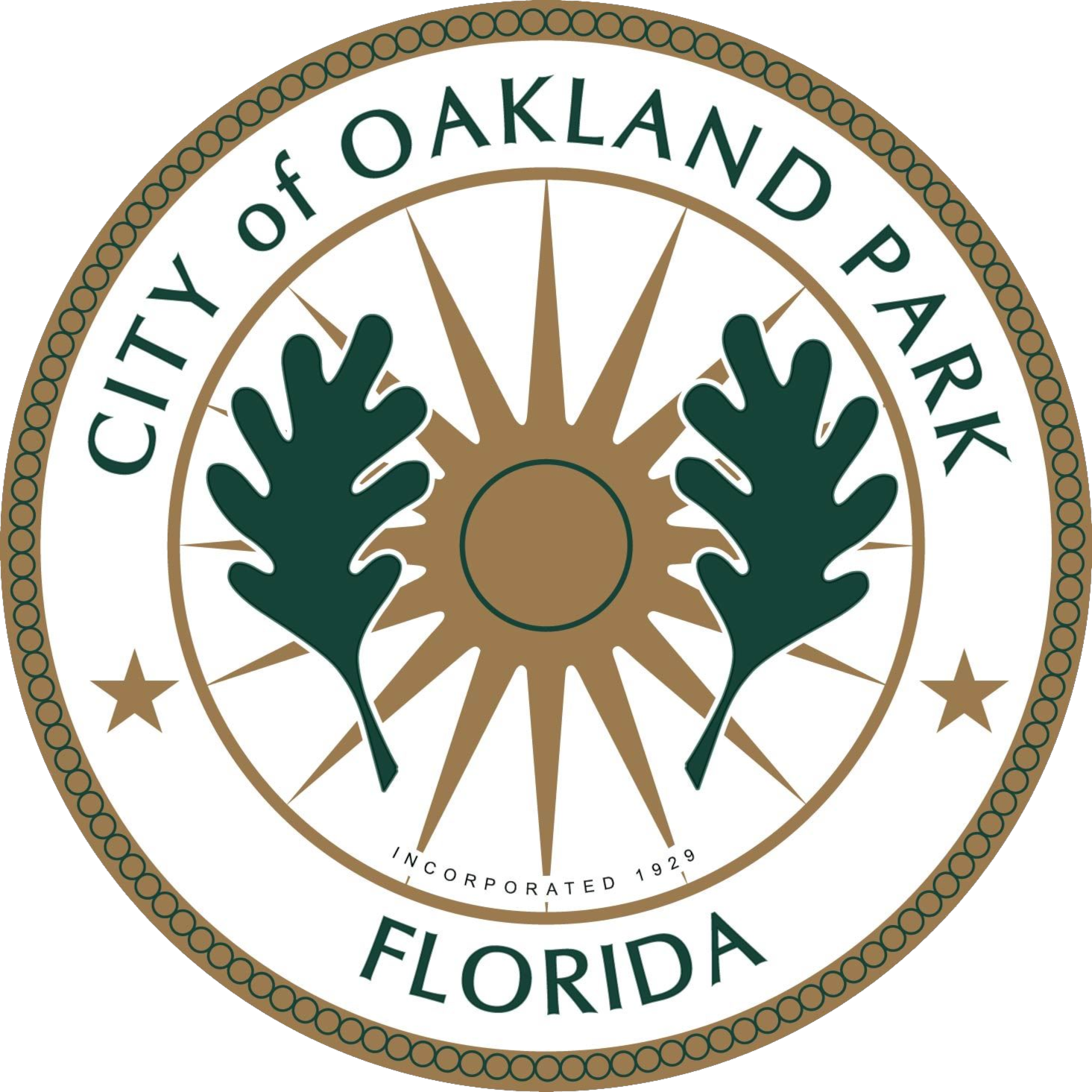
- Flag Seal
- Motto: "Engaged·Inspired·United: A City on the Move"
- Location of Oakland Park in Broward County, Florida

- Location within the United States
- Coordinates: 26°10′35″N 80°08′30″W
- Country: United States
- State: Florida
- County: Broward
- Settled (Colohatchee Settlement): Late 1800s–Early 1900s
- Incorporated (Town of Floranada): November 25, 1925
- Incorporated (City of Oakland Park): July 1, 1929

Government
  - Type: City Commission
  - Mayor: Aisha Gordon
  - Vice Mayor: Letitia Newbold
  - Commissioners: Tim Lonergan; Fitz Budhoo; Chris Fischer
  - City Manager: David Hebert
  - City Clerk: Renee M. Shrout

Area
  - Total: 8.20 sq mi (21.24 km^{2})
  - Land: 7.53 sq mi (19.51 km^{2})
  - Water: 0.67 sq mi (1.73 km^{2})
- Elevation: 7 ft (2.1 m)

Population (2020)
  - Total: 44,229
  - Density: 5,870.5/sq mi (2,266.62/km^{2})
- Time zone: UTC-5 (EST)
  - Summer (DST): UTC-4 (EDT)
- ZIP codes: 33304-33309, 33311, 33334
- Area codes: 754, 954
- FIPS code: 12-50575
- GNIS feature ID: 2404413
- Website: www.oaklandparkfl.gov

Oakland Park, officially the City of Oakland Park, is a city in Broward County, Florida, United States. As of the 2020 United States census, the city's population was 44,229. It is part of the Miami metropolitan area, which was home to 6,166,488 people at the 2020 census. City Hall is now located at the Sky Building at 1100 Park Lane East, Oakland Park, FL 33334

== History ==
Originally named Floranada (a blend of Florida and Canada), the town was forced into bankruptcy after the hurricane of 1926. When the municipality reincorporated in 1929, residents chose to make it a city and voted for the name Oakland Park. The original boundaries went from the Atlantic Ocean, west to what is now U.S. 441, and from the north fork of Middle River north to Cypress Creek Boulevard, but when the boundaries were reestablished, it was to approximately the west side of U.S. 1, west to Northeast 3rd Avenue and the north fork of Middle River north to what is now Prospect Road. Over time, it has expanded to its current boundaries, mainly due to acquiring a few other areas, such as recent annexations of previously unincorporated neighborhoods of Twin Lakes South and North Andrews Gardens.

== Geography ==
According to the United States Census Bureau, the city has a total area of 8.1 square miles (21.1 km^{2}), of which 7.5 square miles (19.3 km^{2}) is land and 0.69 square miles (1.8 km^{2}) (8.40%) is water.

Oakland Park is bisected by the Florida East Coast Railway, which runs parallel to Dixie Highway through the city's downtown. The City of Oakland Park has put into place new zoning regulations intended to transform downtown Oakland Park into a mixed-use pedestrian community. One element of the proposal is the creation of a new commuter rail station on the FEC rail line.

Oakland Park borders the city of Wilton Manors. Increased property prices in Wilton Manors have pushed up prices in Oakland Park and spurred interest in the city's downtown redevelopment plan.

== Climate ==
Oakland Park has a tropical climate, similar to the climate found in much of the Caribbean. It is part of the only region in the 48 contiguous states that falls under that category. More specifically, it generally has a tropical monsoon climate (Köppen climate classification, Am).

== Demographics ==
Historical population
Census	Pop.	Note	%±
1930	463		—
1940	815		76.0%
1950	1,295		58.9%
1960	5,331		311.7%
1970	16,261		205.0%
1980	22,944		41.1%
1990	26,326		14.7%
2000	30,966		17.6%
2010	41,363		33.6%
2020	44,229		6.9%
U.S. Decennial Census

=== Racial and ethnic composition ===
Oakland Park racial composition (Hispanics excluded from racial categories) (NH = Non-Hispanic)
Race	Pop 2010	Pop 2020	% 2010	% 2020
White (NH)	18,650	16,472	45.09%	37.24%
Black or African American (NH)	10,306	11,143	24.92%	25.19%
Native American or Alaska Native (NH)	74	64	0.18%	0.12%
Asian (NH)	796	958	1.92%	2.17%
Pacific Islander or Native Hawaiian (NH)	29	32	0.07%	0.07%
Some other race (NH)	152	332	0.37%	0.75%
Two or more races/Multiracial (NH)	772	1,745	1.87%	3.95%
Hispanic or Latino (any race)	10,584	13,483	25.59%	30.48%
Total	41,363	44,229		

=== 2020 census ===
As of the 2020 census, Oakland Park had a population of 44,229. The median age was 41.1 years. 18.3% of residents were under the age of 18 and 13.9% of residents were 65 years of age or older. For every 100 females there were 116.4 males, and for every 100 females age 18 and over there were 119.1 males age 18 and over.

100.0% of residents lived in urban areas, while 0.0% lived in rural areas.

There were 19,091 households in Oakland Park, of which 24.4% had children under the age of 18 living in them. Of all households, 32.6% were married-couple households, 29.3% were households with a male householder and no spouse or partner present, and 28.0% were households with a female householder and no spouse or partner present. About 33.5% of all households were made up of individuals and 9.6% had someone living alone who was 65 years of age or older.

There were 20,596 housing units, of which 7.3% were vacant. The homeowner vacancy rate was 1.3% and the rental vacancy rate was 6.9%.

Racial composition as of the 2020 census
Race	Number	Percent
White	19,100	43.2%
Black or African American	11,426	25.8%
American Indian and Alaska Native	187	0.4%
Asian	1,002	2.3%
Native Hawaiian and Other Pacific Islander	38	0.1%
Some other race	4,960	11.2%
Two or more races	7,516	17.0%
Hispanic or Latino (of any race)	13,483	30.5%

=== 2010 census ===
As of the 2010 United States census, there were 41,363 people, 18,027 households, and 8,768 families residing in the city.

=== 2000 census ===
As of 2000, 24.5% had children under the age of 18 living with them, 32.3% were married couples living together, 13.3% had a female householder with no husband present, and 48.6% were non-families. 35.1% of all households were made up of individuals, and 7.4% had someone living alone who was 65 years of age or older. The average household size was 2.26 and the average family size was 3.00.

In 2000, the city the population was spread out, with 20.9% under the age of 18, 9.0% from 18 to 24, 38.7% from 25 to 44, 21.3% from 45 to 64, and 10.2% who were 65 years of age or older. The median age was 36 years. For every 100 females, there were 109.1 males. For every 100 females age 18 and over, there were 109.8 males.

In 2000, the median income for a household in the city was $35,493, and the median income for a family was $38,571. Males had a median income of $30,269 versus $25,514 for females. The per capita income for the city was $18,873. About 13.3% of families and 16.5% of the population were below the poverty line, including 22.1% of those under age 18 and 11.3% of those age 65 or over.

As of 2000, English as a first language comprised 66.52%, while 18.16% spoke Spanish, 6.95% spoke French Creole as theirs, 3.32% spoke Portuguese, 1.99% spoke French, Italian was at 0.64%, and German as a mother tongue made up 0.52% of the population.

As of 2000, Oakland Park was the fifteenth most Brazilian-populated area in the US (tied with several other areas) at 2.1%, and it had the twenty-fifth highest percentage of Haitians in the US, with 7% of the population (tied with Ramapo, New York.)

Also, as of 2000, the North Andrews Gardens section of Oakland Park is the sixty-third most Cuban-populated area in the US at 5.76%, while the rest of Oakland Park had the 113th highest percentage of Cubans with 2.03% of all residents. The North Andrews Gardens section was also the thirty-third most Peruvian-populated area in the US, at 1.51% of the population, as well as having the seventy-fourth highest percentage of Colombians in the US, at 2.03% of all residents.

== Neighborhoods ==
These are the neighborhoods and communities that are officially recognized by the City of Oakland Park.

- Andrews Gardens
- Central Business District (Downtown Oakland Park-Main Street)
- Central Corals
- Central Oakland Park
- Coral Brook
- East Lakeside
- Garden Acres
- Harlem McBride
- I-95 Business Corridor Central
- I-95 Business Corridor North
- I-95 Business Corridor South
- Lake Emerald
- Lloyd Estates
- North Andrews Gardens
- North Corals
- North Ridge
- Oakland Forest
- Oakland Grove
- Oakland Hills
- Oaktree Estates
- Orange Grove Manors
- Prospect Gardens
- Rivers Edge
- Royal Palm Acres
- Royal Palm Isles
- Sailboat Lake Pointe
- Sleepy River
- South Corals
- Three Lakes
- Twin Lakes South
- West Lakeside

== Government and infrastructure ==
Oakland Park is represented by 5 City Commissioners, elected to 4-year terms. Commission Members may only serve for 2 consecutive terms. A Commission Member who has served 2 consecutive terms may not run for election for a 2-year period. The City operates under a commission-manager form of government in which the City Manager is appointed by the City Commission and serves as the head of the City's administration. The City Manager's goals are to provide capable and inspiring leadership for City staff, to make day-to-day decisions that allow for the most effective use of resources, and to operate in a manner that improves the quality of life for Oakland Park's business and residents. The United States Postal Service operates post offices in Oakland Park, including the Oakland Park Post Office at 3350 NE 12th Avenue, and the Fort Lauderdale Main Post Office at 1900 West Oakland Park Boulevard.

== Economy ==
Oakland Park is home to Funky Buddha Brewery.^{29]} [30]. The brewery also supports many of the City's events, such as the annual Oakland Park Oktoberfest .

The movie theater chain Muvico had its headquarters in Oakland Park before going defunct in 2017.

== Media ==
Oakland Park is a part of the Miami-Fort Lauderdale-Hollywood media market, which is the twelfth largest radio market and the seventeenth largest television market in the United States. Its primary daily newspapers are the South Florida Sun-Sentinel and The Miami Herald, and their Spanish language counterparts El Sentinel and El Nuevo Herald.

== Libraries ==
The Oakland Park Library, officially named the Ethel M. Gordon Oakland Park Library, is a public library in Oakland Park, Florida.

In 1951, Gordon donated her personal book collection and housed the collection in the Oakland Park Women's Clubhouse. Gordon later won a seat on the City Commission after campaigning on the promise to create a municipal library. On February 10, 1958 the City of Oakland Park Library was officially opened.

On October 16, 2013, the Oakland Park City Commission voted to officially re-name the Library in honor of Ethel M. Gordon.

== Education ==
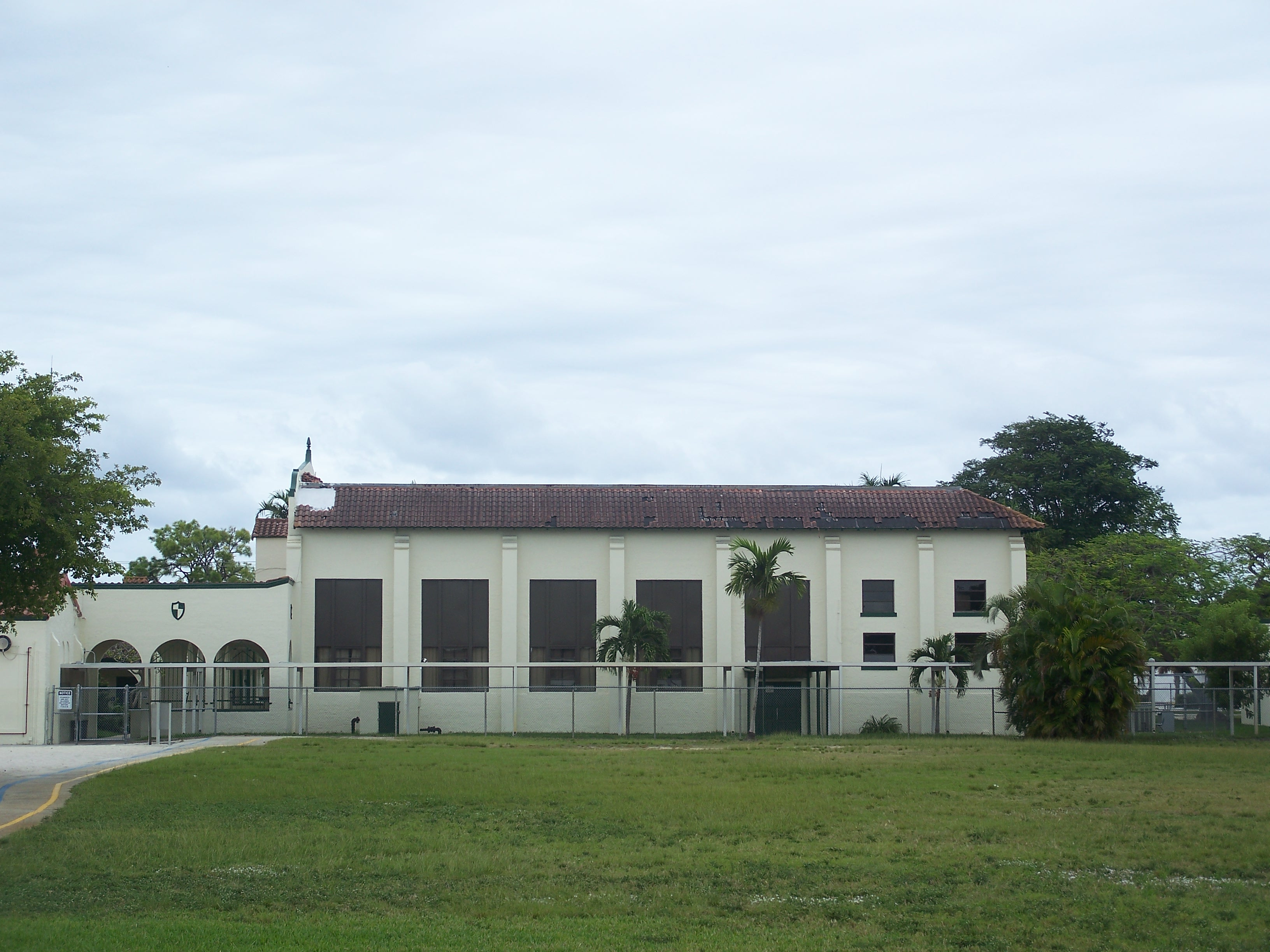
Oakland Park Elementary School

The city is served by Broward County Public Schools.

Public schools within the city limits:

- Lloyd Estates Elementary School – Southwestern Oakland Park
- North Andrews Gardens Elementary School – Northern Oakland Park
- Oakland Park Elementary School – Central and Southern Oakland Park (It is a 1925 school building on the National Register of Historic Places.)
- James S. Rickards Middle School – Serves most of the city
- Northeast High School – Serves most of the city

Public schools outside of the city limits zoned to Oakland Park students:

- Floranada Elementary School (Fort Lauderdale)
- Oriole Elementary School (Lauderdale Lakes)
- Rock Island Elementary School (Fort Lauderdale)
- William Dandy Elementary School (Fort Lauderdale)
- Wilton Manors Elementary School (Wilton Manors).
- Lauderdale Lakes Middle School (Lauderdale Lakes)
- Sunrise Middle School (Fort Lauderdale).
- Boyd Anderson High School (Lauderdale Lakes)
- Fort Lauderdale High School (Fort Lauderdale)
