= Oak Grove Elementary School =

Oak Grove Elementary School can refer to:

- Oak Grove Elementary School (California)
- Oak Grove Elementary School (Georgia)
- Oak Grove Elementary School (Raleigh, North Carolina)
- Oak Grove Elementary School (Chattanooga, Tennessee), listed on the National Register of Historic Places (NRHP) in Hamilton County, Tennessee
