= Oak Grove, Arizona =

- Ghost town
- Location within the state of Arizona Oak Grove (the United States)
- Coordinates: 36°09′10″N 113°35′02″W
- Country: United States
- State: Arizona
- County: Mohave
- Elevation: 5,945 ft (1,812 m)
- Time zone: UTC-7 (Mountain (MST))
  - Summer (DST): UTC-7 (MST)
- Area code: 928
- FIPS code: 04-50370
- GNIS feature ID: 24541

Oak Grove is a ghost town in Mohave County, Arizona, United States. It has an estimated elevation of 5,945 feet (1,812 m) above sea level.
