= McGehee–Stringfellow House =

Historic house in Alabama, United States

- U.S. National Register of Historic Places
- The house in September 1979

- Location within Alabama Location within the United States
- Nearest city: Greensboro, Alabama
- Coordinates: 32°45′7″N 87°40′41″W
- Built: 1824
- Architectural style: Federal
- NRHP reference No.: 80000686
- Added to NRHP: September 17, 1980

The McGehee–Stringfellow House, also known as Oak Grove, was a historic plantation house near Greensboro, Alabama, United States. It was added to the National Register of Historic Places on September 17, 1980, due to its architectural significance. It was accidentally destroyed in the 1980s during an attempt to move it to another location.

== History ==
The house was built by Abraham and Harriet Hill McGehee. Abraham McGehee was born in Oglethorpe County, Georgia in 1791; Harriet was born in 1798. They married in 1817.

By 1824 they had relocated to Alabama and were building the house. Construction on the house stopped after Harriet's death on February 25, 1826. She was the first burial in the family cemetery on the property. McGehee sold the house and the 800-acre (3.2 km^{2}) plantation property to Enoch Stringfellow, and migrated west to Mississippi. Enoch Stringfellow died in 1839 and the house was inherited by his son, McDonald.

McDonald Stringfellow died in 1875, but the house remained in the Stringfellow family until the late 1970s. But deferred maintenance had resulted in the house beginning to deteriorate in the 1940s. The decline in the agricultural company had left the family without resources to maintain the house.

The house and surrounding property were sold in the 1970s to MacMillan Bloedel, a forestry company. The company attempted to move the house from the property in the 1980s, but the brick structure collapsed while still on its original site. The house site remains on the National Register of Historic Places.

== Architecture ==
The McGehee–Stringfellow House was built in the Federal-style. It was a two-story structure with two rooms and a central hall on each floor. The entire house was built from brick that was handmade on the plantation by McGehee's enslaved African-American workers. It featured side gables and a symmetrical three-bay facade. Both sides of the house had large external chimneys centered in the wall, with windows to either side on both floors. The original woodwork in the house was joined using the older technique of wooden pegs, rather than nails.

McGehee had planned a two-story brick ell for the rear of the house, but it was not built due to the interruption of Harriet's death. Instead, Enoch Stringfellow added a frame addition to the rear of the house, as well as a detached one-story log kitchen. McDonald Stringfellow replaced the log kitchen with a frame building housing the kitchen and dining room. It was connected to the house by a covered breezeway.
