= Oak Grove School District =

Oak Grove School District could refer to:

- Oak Grove School District (San Jose, California)
- Oak Grove Union School District (Sonoma County, California)
- Oak Grove School District 68 (Bartonville, Illinois), with two primary schools in Peoria County
- Oak Grove School District 68 (Lake County, Illinois), with one primary school in Green Oaks
- Oak Grove R-VI School District (Oak Grove, Missouri), in Jackson County
- Oak Grove School District No. 10 (Ray County, Missouri), which consolidated in 1950 with what became Hardin-Central School District
- Oak Grove Public School (Cushing, Oklahoma), a primary single-school district in Payne County
- Oak Grove School District (Arkansas), former school district in Arkansas

== See also ==
- Oak Grove School (disambiguation)
