= Brian Mailhot =

American professional wrestler

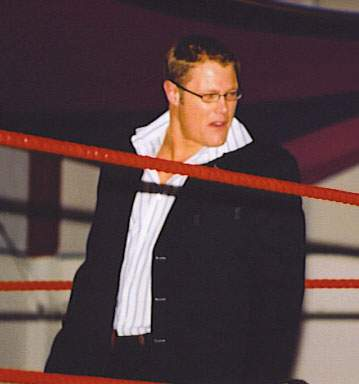
- Mailhot in 2006

Personal information
- Born: August 12, 1975 (age 50) Portland, Maine, U.S.

Professional wrestling career
- Ring name(s): Palmer Canon; Brian Black
- Billed height: 6 ft 4 in (1.93 m)
- Billed weight: 260 lb (120 kg)
- Billed from: Portland, Maine
- Trained by: Mike Hollow; Killer Kowalski
- Debut: 1999
- Retired: 2010

Brian Mailhot (born August 12, 1975) is an American professional wrestler and mixed martial arts fighter, better known for his short stint in World Wrestling Entertainment's SmackDown! brand under the ring name of Palmer Canon.

== Professional Wrestling career ==
=== Early career (1999-2002) ===
Mailhot debuted in 1999 for the Eastern Wrestling Alliance, losing to Larry Huntley in a match in Portland, Maine. After his first match Mailhot elected to take more time to focus on his in ring training and worked for the Eastern Wrestling Alliance in a character role as their commissioner. As commissioner he feuded with Alexander Worthington III, often countering Worthington's devious exploits with his power as commissioner although he did not wrestle a match again until early 2002 when his dealings with Worthington finally escalated to an in ring encounter.

=== Chaotic Wrestling (2002-2005) ===
In 2002 he began working for Chaotic Wrestling in Massachusetts as "Big League" Brian Black. He formed a tag team with The Mighty Mini, and the partners won the CW Tag Team Championships on two occasions, in 2003 defeating Atrition and 2004, defeating Peter Mulloy and Brian Buffet. Mailhot won his first singles championship, the vacant New England Championship, on April 30, 2004, in a twenty-eight man royal rumble. He won the Heavyweight Championship on March 18, 2005, defeating Maverick Wild, but vacated the title on April 1 after signing a contract with World Wrestling Entertainment in March 2005.

=== All-Star Wrestling Association (2004-2005) ===
During this time Mailhot was also wrestling for the now sold and renamed All-Star Wrestling Association based in Nashua, New Hampshire. He debuted as Brian Black on February 21, 2004, in a loss to Adam Booker, which led to a short feud between the two. Following that he captured the AWA Tag Team Championship on May 15, 2004, in Claremont, New Hampshire, with The Mighty Mini, his tag partner from Chaotic Wrestling. This turned into a phantom switch, though, when Mailhot changed to a new persona the next show. Since the switch took place outside of their typical venue in Nashua it was simply ignored and the titles were returned to The Swerve. On May 22, 2004, he debuted a German character of his own creation, Otto Von Schwartz. Taking full advantage of his German heritage and ability to speak German, he worked as a heel, feuding primarily with Greg "The Hammer" Valentine. He captured the AWA Heavyweight Championship from Valentine on September 25, 2004, but dropped it on April 9, 2005. He then departed to the WWE developmental Deep South Wrestling.

=== World Wrestling Entertainment (2005-2006) ===
==== Deep South Wrestling (2005) ====
Mailhot began training in WWE's auxiliary developmental territory, Deep South Wrestling. On May 2, 2005, he had a dark match against Todd Hansen, with Hansen gaining the victory.

==== SmackDown! (2005–2006) ====
Mailhot debuted on WWE television on the January 6, 2005 episode of SmackDown! as a local competitor under the Brian Black name, where he was quickly defeated by Kurt Angle as part of Angle's Kurt Angle Invitational challenge. Later that year, he appeared as an authority figure called Palmer Canon. His character was ostensibly a representative of the oppressive "Network". This gimmick reflected what WWE perceived as increasing interference by UPN regarding the content of SmackDown!, most notably UPN's demand that WWE remove Mark Copani's controversial Muhammad Hassan character from television. His character and booking of matches that the fans disliked led to mainly heel reactions. The gimmick was reminiscent of both Right to Censor, a stable created to parody the Parents Television Council, and The Network, an ECW stable led by Cyrus which claimed to represent TNN. The name Palmer Canon might have been a play with the initials "P.C.". This connection between his name and political correctness was made more evident when commentator Tazz called him P.C. when Canon came to do ringside commentary. His character also consisted of booking matches behind the back of Theodore Long (e.g. he made Eddie Guerrero the number one contender, despite Long's wishes to have that right go to Rey Mysterio). He also introduced Marty Wright as "The Boogeyman" as a decision by the network for ratings, added "The Juniors", a midget wrestling division and the tag team "The Dicks" (John Toland and Chad Wicks), though all were later released. Wright's release only lasted two weeks, however.

On the February 3, 2006, edition of SmackDown!, William Regal and Paul Burchill told Canon that they no longer wanted to be a tag team so they could go their separate ways. During this discussion Burchill informed Canon that his family heritage traces back to pirates, and that he wanted to do a pirate gimmick on SmackDown! Later, on the April 21, 2006, edition of SmackDown!, Canon remarked that The Miz was acting inappropriately, and had him escorted from the arena by security.

On April 20, 2006, Mailhot abruptly flew himself home from a WWE tour in Italy and gave his notice to WWE officials, citing harassment from John "Bradshaw" Layfield (JBL) and his "Wrestler's Court" as the reason for his resignation. He was granted his release on April 27, 2006. This forced the postponement of the Miz's planned wrestling debut, as the Palmer Canon/Miz feud had to be canceled.

=== Later Career (2006-2010) ===
Mailhot returned to Portland, Maine.

Brian made his amateur MMA debut on August 23, 2008, at Untamed 22 as Brian "Hacksaw" Mailhot. It was promoted by Full Force Fighting Championships, at the Plymouth Memorial Hall. He defeated Tony Rea via KO by slam in 1:01 of the second round.

He has wrestled for All Out Mayhem in southern and eastern Maine since his departure from WWE in 2006. He won the AOM Heavyweight Championship from Captain Freedom in South Portland, Maine on November 20, 2010, only to lose it later in the night to Larry Zbyszko.

== Championships and accomplishments ==
- All Out Mayhem
  - AOM Heavyweight Championship (1 time)
- All-Star Wrestling Association
  - AWA Heavyweight Championship (1 time)
  - AWA Tag Team Championship (1 time) – with The Mighty Mini
- Chaotic Wrestling
  - Chaotic Wrestling Heavyweight Championship (1 time)
  - Chaotic Wrestling New England Championship (1 time)
  - Chaotic Wrestling Tag Team Championship (2 times) – with The Mighty Mini
  - Third Triple Crown Champion
