= Royal Rumble (2006) =

World Wrestling Entertainment pay-per-view event

- Promotional poster featuring the McMahon family (Shane McMahon, Vince McMahon, Linda McMahon, and Stephanie McMahon) dressed as Greek royalty.
- Promotion: World Wrestling Entertainment
- Brand(s): Raw; SmackDown!
- Date: January 29, 2006
- City: Miami, Florida
- Venue: American Airlines Arena
- Attendance: 16,000
- Buy rate: 585,000

Pay-per-view chronology
← Previous; New Year's Revolution	Next → No Way Out

Royal Rumble chronology
← Previous; 2005	Next → 2007

The 2006 Royal Rumble was a professional wrestling pay-per-view (PPV) event produced by World Wrestling Entertainment (WWE), held for wrestlers from the promotion's Raw and SmackDown! brand divisions. It was the 19th annual Royal Rumble event and took place on January 29, 2006, in the American Airlines Arena in Miami, Florida.

The event was based around the men's Royal Rumble match, a modified 30-man battle royal in which the participants enter at timed intervals instead of all beginning in the ring at the same time and the winner received a world championship match at WrestleMania. For the 2006 event, the winner received their choice to challenge for either Raw's WWE Championship or SmackDown!'s World Heavyweight Championship at WrestleMania 22. This was the fifth Royal Rumble event in which the titular match was not the main event (final match), after the inaugural 1988 event and the events in 1996, 1997, and 1998.

Six professional wrestling matches were featured on the event's supercard, a scheduling of more than one main event. The main event was the main match from SmackDown! and saw Kurt Angle defend the World Heavyweight Championship against Mark Henry, which Angle won to retain. The main match on the undercard was the 2006 Royal Rumble match, which featured wrestlers from both brands. SmackDown!'s Rey Mysterio, the second entrant, won the match by last eliminating Randy Orton, the 30th entrant, also from SmackDown!. The predominant match on the Raw brand was Edge versus John Cena for the WWE Championship, which Cena won to win the title.

== Production ==
=== Background ===
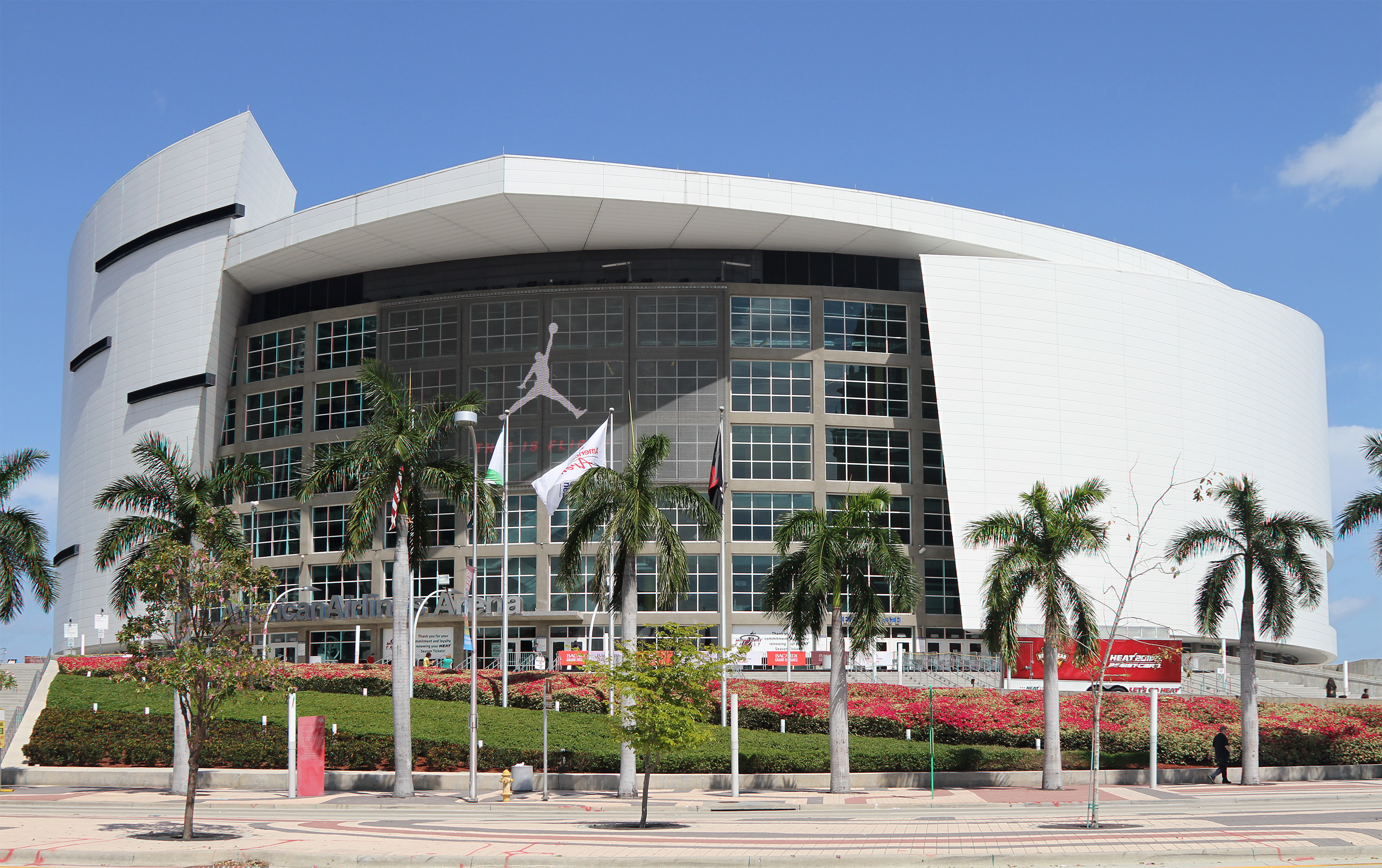
The 19th annual Royal Rumble event was held at the American Airlines Arena in Miami, Florida.

The Royal Rumble is an annual professional wrestling event, produced every January by World Wrestling Entertainment (WWE) since 1988; that first event was a television special before it became an annual pay-per-view (PPV) beginning in 1989. It is one of the promotion's original four pay-per-views, along with WrestleMania, SummerSlam, and Survivor Series, referred to as the "Big Four". It is named after and centered on the men's Royal Rumble match. The 19th Royal Rumble event was scheduled to be held on January 29, 2006, at the American Airlines Arena in Miami, Florida and it featured wrestlers from the Raw and SmackDown! brands.

The Royal Rumble match is a modified battle royal in which the participants enter at timed intervals instead of all beginning in the ring at the same time, and the match generally features 30 wrestlers. Since 1993, the winner earns a world championship match at that year's WrestleMania. For 2006, the winner could choose to challenge for either Raw's WWE Championship or SmackDown!'s World Heavyweight Championship at WrestleMania 22. At the prior three events, the World Heavyweight Championship was Raw's top title while the WWE Championship was SmackDown!'s, but as a result of the 2005 WWE Draft Lottery, the titles switched brands.

=== Storylines ===
The event included matches that resulted from scripted storylines. Results were predetermined by WWE's writers on the Raw and SmackDown! brands, while storylines were produced on WWE's weekly television shows, Raw and SmackDown!.

Prior to the annual Royal Rumble match, several qualifying matches for the match took place on WWE's flagship television programs. The first three qualifying matches were held on the January 9 episode of Raw. Chavo Guerrero defeated Rob Conway, Shelton Benjamin defeated Val Venis, and Kane defeated Snitsky, meaning they had earned a place in the Rumble. A Battle Royal also took place on the January 16 episode of WWE Heat in addition to a Singles match between Trevor Murdoch and Antonio Thomas, which Murdoch won.

Royal Rumble qualification matches

- Chavo Guerrero defeated Rob Conway – Raw, January 9
- Shelton Benjamin defeated Val Venis – Raw, January 9
- Kane defeated Snitsky – Raw, January 9
- Sylvan defeated Scotty 2 Hotty – WWE Velocity, January 15 (aired January 21)
- Trevor Murdoch defeated Antonio – WWE Heat, January 16 (aired January 20)
- Viscera defeated Lance Cade, Gregory Helms and Tyson Tomko in a Battle Royal – WWE Heat, January 16 (aired January 20)
- Jonathan Coachman defeated Jerry Lawler – Raw, January 23
- Big Show defeated Gregory Helms, Lance Cade and Rob Conway in a Battle Royal Raw, January 23
- Mexicools (Psicosis and Super Crazy) defeated The Dicks (Chad and James) and Full Blooded Italians (Nunzio and Vito) in a Triple Threat tag team match – SmackDown!, January 24 (aired January 27)

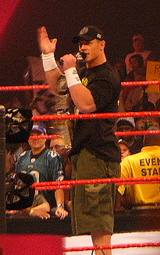
John Cena challenged Edge for Raw's WWE Championship.

The main feud heading into the Royal Rumble on the Raw brand was between Edge and John Cena, with the two feuding over the WWE Championship. The feud started at New Year's Revolution when Cena won an Elimination Chamber match also involving 5 other superstars to retain the WWE title. Immediately after the match, however, Vince McMahon came out and stated that Edge was cashing in his Money in the Bank contract that he won at WrestleMania 21. Edge then came out with Lita and, two spears later, he pinned Cena to become WWE Champion. Then the next night, Edge held a live sex celebration which got smashed up by Cena and Cena delivered an FU on Lita and sent a message to Edge.

The main feud heading into the Royal Rumble on the SmackDown! brand was between Kurt Angle and Mark Henry over the World Heavyweight Championship. The World Heavyweight Championship was originally held by Batista. He defended the title against Henry at a SmackDown! live event in a steel cage match. Henry was disqualified in the match and Batista retained the title but his triceps were injured. As a result, he was forced to vacate the title on the January 13 episode of SmackDown!. Later on, a 20-man battle royal was arranged to determine the new World Heavyweight Champion. Raw superstar Kurt Angle won the battle royal last eliminating Mark Henry and winning the vacant title thus also starting a rivalry between the two. This also made Angle leave Raw and move to SmackDown!. The next week, Henry defeated Rey Mysterio to become the Number One Contender to Angle's title.

== Event ==
Other on-screen personnel
Role:	Name:
English commentators	Joey Styles (Raw)
English commentators	Jerry Lawler (Raw/Royal Rumble Match)
English commentators	Michael Cole (SmackDown/Royal Rumble Match)
English commentators	Tazz (SmackDown)
Spanish commentators	Carlos Cabrera
Spanish commentators	Hugo Savinovich
Interviewers	Todd Grisham
Interviewers	Josh Mathews
Ring announcer	Lilian Garcia (Raw/Royal Rumble Match)
Ring announcer	Tony Chimel (SmackDown)
Referees	Nick Patrick
Referees	Charles Robinson
Referees	Mike Chioda
Referees	Mickie Henson
Referees	Chris Kay
Referees	Jim Korderas

=== Dark match ===
Before the event went live on pay-per-view, Finlay defeated Brian Kendrick in a match that aired on Heat.

=== Preliminary matches ===
The opening match was a 6-Way Cruiserweight Open match for the WWE Cruiserweight Championship which was held by Kid Kash at the time. Funaki, Jamie Noble, Nunzio, Paul London, and Raw superstar Gregory Helms joined the match to challenge Kash for the Cruiserweight Championship. A memorable spot from this match was Paul London executing a shooting star press onto all of the challengers. Gregory Helms executed a flying neckbreaker on London. Kid Kash nailed London with a Dead Level. He covered London but Nunzio and Funaki broke up the count. Noble held Funaki in the dragon sleeper. Helms attempted a shining wizard on Noble, but he avoided the move. Helms threw Noble out of the ring and then pinned Funaki after a shining wizard to win the Cruiserweight title.

The second match was a divas match between Mickie James and Ashley Massaro. Trish Stratus was the special guest referee for this match. Before the match started, James told Stratus backstage that she loved her. While the match started, Massaro worked over James's arm. While Massaro pounded James into the corner, Stratus pulled James. James would later up work out on Massaro's back and neck. Massaro made a comeback in the match, but finally, James powerbombed her to win the match.

In the third match, The Boogeyman faced John "Bradshaw" Layfield (with his valet Jillian Hall). In the match, JBL tried to do everything to measure out Boogeyman. Finally, JBL had Boogeyman measured and went for the Clothesline from Hell but he missed the move and was sent crashing shoulder first into the post. Boogeyman nailed JBL with a pumphandle slam to win the match. After the match, he tried to throw worms in JBL's mouth but JBL threw his valet Jillian into the ring and Boogeyman threw worms in her mouth.

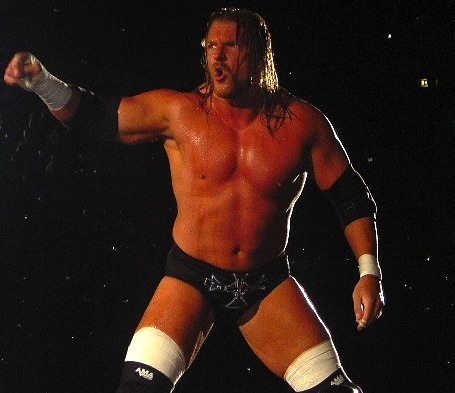
Triple H, the first entrant in the 2006 Royal Rumble match.

The fourth match was the 2006 Royal Rumble match. Triple H drew as the No. 1 entrant while Rey Mysterio drew No. 2. Mysterio and Triple H fought off each other in the beginning of the match. Later on, the two teamed up to eliminate No. 3 entrant Simon Dean. Mysterio eliminated No. 4 entrant Psicosis on his own. Ric Flair drew No. 5 but he made a mistake by charging Triple H near the ropes. Triple H simply sidestepped the charge and eliminated Flair from the match. No. 6 entrant was Big Show and No. 7 entrant was Jonathan Coachman. Coach was quickly eliminated with a swat of Big Show's hand. Bobby Lashley drew No. 8 while Big Show's World Tag Team Championship partner at the time, Kane drew No. 9, while making made his tenth appearance in a Royal Rumble match, tying the record for most Royal Rumble appearances with Rikishi. It also marked his eighth consecutive appearance in the Royal Rumble as Kane, breaking the previous record of seven consecutive appearances held by himself, Owen Hart and Rick Martel.

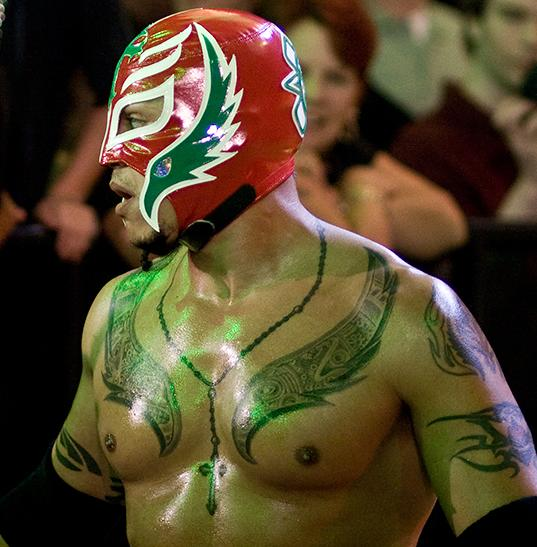
Rey Mysterio lasted 62 minutes in the Royal Rumble match to win it from the #2 spot.

Big Show and Kane teamed up to eliminate Lashley and then the two targeted each other trying to eliminate each other at the ropes. Triple H took the advantage and eliminated both men from behind. In addition, Tatanka and Rob Van Dam returned to WWE television in this Royal Rumble match with Tatanka drawing No. 15 while Van Dam drawing No. 20. Van Dam took down all superstars in the ring (except Mysterio). He went to eliminate Road Warrior Animal, Goldust, and later Carlito. Shawn Michaels entered No. 25 into the match and started attacking his enemies. He went on to eliminate Trevor Murdoch, Johnny Nitro, and Shelton Benjamin.

As Michaels eliminated Benjamin from the match, Mr. McMahon's music played which distracted Michaels. McMahon made his way to the ring while Shane McMahon (not an official entrant) eliminated Michaels from behind. Michaels returned to the ring and tried to attack Shane until Triple H beat him and Michaels delivered Sweet Chin Music to Triple H. As a result, Triple H, Mysterio, Carlito, Van Dam and Randy Orton remained the final five participants. Carlito worked on Van Dam but Van Dam countered and threw him out of the ring with the final four participants remaining. Mysterio and Van Dam formed an alliance against two former Evolution partners Triple H and Orton. Van Dam tried to perform a five-star frog splash on Orton, but Triple H attacked Van Dam and then threw Mysterio into Van Dam which sent Van Dam crashing to the floor.

Triple H, Mysterio and Orton were the final three participants. Triple H and Orton teamed to eliminate Mysterio but failed to do so, instead, Mysterio performed a 619 on both men, and then eliminated Triple H from the match. As retaliation, Triple H assaulted Mysterio and threw him into the steel steps, before rolling him back into the ring for Orton to eliminate. Orton tried to eliminate Mysterio, but Mysterio countered and was able to eliminate Orton to win the 2006 Royal Rumble match. Mysterio paid tribute to Guerrero by winning the match saying that he had won the match for Guerrero. Mysterio broke the record for lasting the longest in a Royal Rumble match, 1:02:12. The previous record was 1:01:30, set by Chris Benoit at the 2004 Royal Rumble. Finally, Mysterio was the second person to win from the #2 slot, the first being Vince McMahon in the 1999 Royal Rumble.

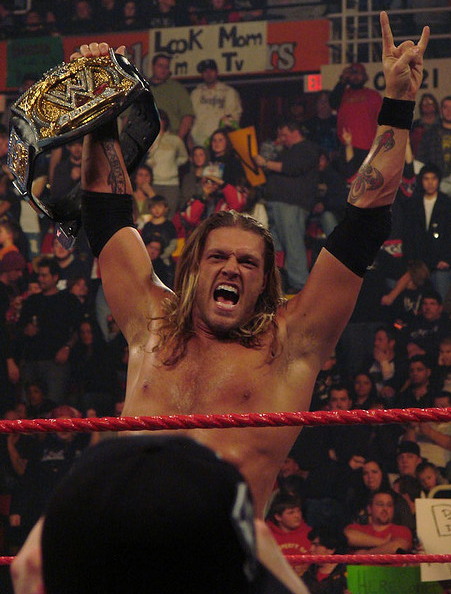
Edge as Raw's WWE Champion.

The fifth match was between Edge and John Cena for the WWE Championship, with Edge defending the title in their New Year's Revolution rematch. Cena entered the ring on a large steel catwalk-like scaffold that had been lowered from the ceiling. Before Cena's entrance, fireworks started throughout the arena. Cena had the match in control in the beginning but later on he was forced to retreat to the floor on multiple occasions. Finally, Cena had enough and followed him, but Edge used Lita as a decoy. Edge speared Cena into the steel ring steps and following a baseball slide which threw Cena into the crowd. Edge remained in control and set Cena on the top rope but was subsequently pushed down. Cena went for a top rope splash but Edge moved away. Cena would make a comeback and try an FU but failed. Cena made a comeback during the conclusion of the match. He went for a Five Knuckle Shuffle but was distracted when Lita jumped on the apron to draw Cena's attention. Edge recovered as Cena and Lita argued, but when Edge charged, Cena sidestepped and Edge ran into Lita. Cena took advantage of the situation and quickly executed an FU on Edge and then put him into an STFU. Edge couldn't escape, so he submitted, making Cena the new WWE Champion.

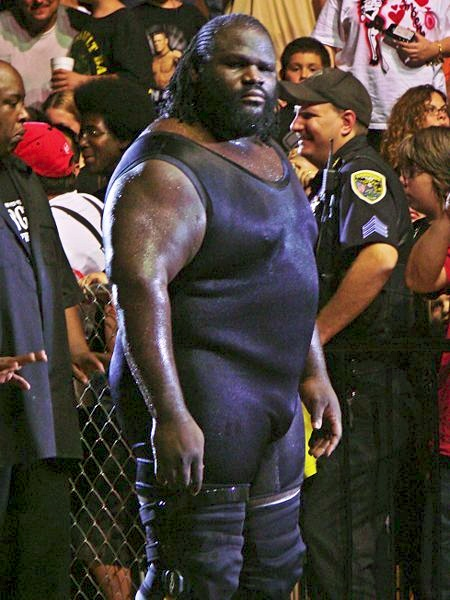
Mark Henry challenged Kurt Angle for SmackDown!'s World Heavyweight Championship in the main event.

The main event was between Kurt Angle and Mark Henry for the World Heavyweight Championship. Angle defended the title in this match against Henry. The match marked the first time that two former Olympians battled for a world title in history. Angle began the match in trying to put Henry down but instead, Henry dumped him to the floor, where Angle was beaten by former manager Daivari. Henry controlled Angle using his power but Angle managed to apply the ankle lock. After Henry kicked out after an Angle Slam, Angle locked in an ankle lock once more. Daivari distracted the referee and when Henry broke the hold again, he sent Angle crashing into the referee. At that point, Kurt got a chair. Daivari tried to stop him but Angle hit Daivari with the chair. When Angle tried to use the chair, Henry blocked the attempt and tossed Angle to the mat. As Henry advanced though, Angle low blowed Henry, which was followed by two chair shots. Angle went for the pin, but Henry kicked out. Angle untied one of the turnbuckle pads on the middle rope. Angle ended up in that corner, but as Henry charged, Angle sidestepped and tripped him into the exposed steel. Angle rolled up Henry to retain the World Heavyweight Championship but as Angle celebrated, there was all darkness and The Undertaker's music played. The Undertaker made his return to WWE television, in his first appearance since Armageddon, entering on a horse-drawn chariot. He intimidated Angle and then the ropes went down and the ring collapsed.

== Aftermath ==
Chris Benoit and Booker T continued their feud over the WWE United States Championship. Benoit went on to win the title from Booker T at No Way Out. Rey Mysterio was awarded a match against Kurt Angle for the World Heavyweight Championship which was scheduled to take place at WrestleMania 22, but before that, Mysterio defended his spot against Randy Orton at No Way Out. Orton won the match and Rey's title shot. Mysterio would later be readded to the match, forming a Triple Threat match between Angle, Mysterio and Orton. At No Way Out, Angle successfully defended the World Heavyweight Championship against The Undertaker, but lost the title to Mysterio at WrestleMania.

In February, the Road to WrestleMania tournament was arranged to determine a new number one contender to John Cena's WWE Championship. This was an eight-man tournament on Raw. Triple H, Rob Van Dam, and Big Show faced each other in the final round of the tournament which was a triple threat match. Van Dam performed a Five Star Frog Splash on Big Show, but when he made the pin, Triple H pulled the referee. While the referee was distracted, Big Show was able to kick out. Triple H took advantage and performed a Pedigree on Van Dam to win the tournament and become the number one contender to the WWE Championship. At WrestleMania 22, Cena defeated Triple H to retain the WWE Championship via submission after forcing Triple H to submit to the STFU.

In mid-2006, WWE launched a third brand dubbed ECW, which featured wrestlers from the former Extreme Championship Wrestling (ECW) promotion, as well as newer talent. Additionally, the ECW World Heavyweight Championship was reactivated to be the brand's top championship, and third concurrently active world title in WWE.

== Results ==
No.	Results	Stipulations	Times
1^{H}	Finlay defeated Brian Kendrick	Singles match	2:07
2	Gregory Helms defeated Kid Kash (c), Funaki, Jamie Noble, Nunzio, and Paul London	Cruiserweight Open for the WWE Cruiserweight Championship	7:40
3	Mickie James defeated Ashley	Singles match with Trish Stratus as special guest referee	7:44
4	The Boogeyman defeated John "Bradshaw" Layfield (with Jillian Hall)	Singles match	1:54
5	Rey Mysterio won by last eliminating Randy Orton	30-man Royal Rumble match for a world championship match at WrestleMania 22	1:02:15
6	John Cena defeated Edge (c) (with Lita)	Singles match for the WWE Championship	14:03
7	Kurt Angle (c) defeated Mark Henry (with Daivari)	Singles match for the World Heavyweight Championship	9:29
(c) / – the champion(s) heading into the match; H / – the match was broadcast prior to the pay-per-view on Sunday Night Heat

=== Royal Rumble entrances and eliminations ===
– Raw
– SmackDown!
– Winner

Draw	Entrant	Brand	Order of elimination	Eliminated by	Time	Eliminations
1	Triple H	Raw	28	Rey Mysterio	1:00:16	6
2	Rey Mysterio	SmackDown!	—	Winner	1:02:15*	6
3	Simon Dean	SmackDown!	1	Rey Mysterio and Triple H	00:45	0
4	Psicosis	SmackDown!	2	Rey Mysterio	01:15	0
5	Ric Flair	Raw	3	Triple H	01:20	0
6	Big Show	Raw	7	Triple H	09:02	2
7	Jonathan Coachman	Raw	4	Big Show	00:30	0
8	Bobby Lashley	SmackDown!	6	Big Show and Kane	04:17	1
9	Kane	Raw	8	Triple H	03:33	1
10	Sylvan	SmackDown!	5	Bobby Lashley	00:18	0
11	Carlito	Raw	26	Rob Van Dam	38:29	2
12	Chris Benoit	SmackDown!	17	Randy Orton	30:31	2
13	Booker T	SmackDown!	9	Chris Benoit	00:18	0
14	Joey Mercury	SmackDown!	22	Shawn Michaels and Johnny Nitro	29:14	1
15	Tatanka	SmackDown!	12	Joey Mercury and Johnny Nitro	14:09	0
16	Johnny Nitro	SmackDown!	23	Shawn Michaels	25:45	2
17	Trevor Murdoch	Raw	13	Shawn Michaels	13:41	0
18	Eugene	Raw	15	Chris Benoit	16:25	0
19	Road Warrior Animal	SmackDown!	10	Rob Van Dam	02:49	0
20	Rob Van Dam	Raw	27	Triple H and Rey Mysterio	23:52	4
21	Orlando Jordan	SmackDown!	21	Randy Orton	16:09	0
22	Chavo Guerrero	Raw	11	Triple H	00:59	0
23	Matt Hardy	SmackDown!	14	Viscera	07:42	0
24	Super Crazy	SmackDown!	16	Rey Mysterio and Rob Van Dam	07:40	0
25	Shawn Michaels	Raw	25	Shane McMahon**	12:55	4
26	Chris Masters	Raw	19	Carlito	07:01	1
27	Viscera	Raw	18	Carlito & Chris Masters	05:20	1
28	Shelton Benjamin	Raw	24	Shawn Michaels	06:51	0
29	Goldust	Raw	20	Rob Van Dam	03:09	0
30	Randy Orton	SmackDown!	29	Rey Mysterio	13:04	2

(*) Rey Mysterio broke the longevity record for lasting 1:02:15, previous record held by Chris Benoit (lasting 1:01:35) in Royal Rumble 2004. This record would stand for 17 years (not counting Daniel Bryan lasting for 1:16:05 since it happened in a 50-man version of the Royal Rumble match at the Greatest Royal Rumble) before it would be broken by Gunther (lasting 1:11:40) in 2023.

(**) Shane McMahon was not a participant in the match.
