= Chaotic Wrestling Television Championship =

Professional wrestling championship

Details
- Promotion: Chaotic Wrestling
- Date established: February 23, 2001
- Date retired: February 16, 2002
Statistics
- First champion(s): Luis Ortiz
- Final champion(s): Dukes Dalton
- Most reigns: Dukes Dalton and "Latin Fury" Luis Ortiz (2 reigns)
- Longest reign: R. J. Brewer (148 days)
- Shortest reign: Dukes Dalton (7 days)

The Chaotic Wrestling (CW) Television Championship was a professional wrestling title in American independent promotion Chaotic Wrestling. The title was first won by "Latin Fury" Luis Ortiz in Revere, Massachusetts on February 23, 2001. There have been a total of 4 recognized individual champions, who have had a combined 6 official reigns. On February 2, 2002, after being unified with the CW Light Heavyweight Championship, Dukes Dalton retires both titles after winning the New England Championship on February 16.

== Title history ==
Key
No.	Overall reign number
Reign	Reign number for the specific champion
Days	Number of days held

No.	Champion	Championship change			Reign statistics		Notes	Ref.
No.	Champion	Date	Event	Location	Reign	Days	Notes	Ref.
1	"Latin Fury" Luis Ortiz	February 23, 2001	N/A	Revere, Massachusetts	1	84	Defeated Edward G, Xtasy and Master Sandy in three-way match to become first champion..	
2	Dukes Dalton	May 18, 2001	N/A	Revere, Massachusetts	1	7		
3	"Latin Fury" Luis Ortiz	May 25, 2001	N/A	Lawrence, Massachusetts	2	49		
4	Slyk Wagner Brown	July 13, 2001	N/A	Lawrence, Massachusetts	1	56	Defeated Luis Ortiz and Kyle Storm in a Three-way match.	
5	"Hurricane" John Walters	September 7, 2001	CW	Lawrence, Massachusetts	1	148		
6	Dukes Dalton	February 2, 2002	N/A	Lawrence, Massachusetts	2	14	Unifies the title with the Light Heavyweight Championship.	
—	Unified	February 16, 2002	—	Lowell, Massachusetts	—	—	Both titles retired immediately after Dalton wins the New England Championship.	
