= Evan Markopoulos =

American professional wrestler

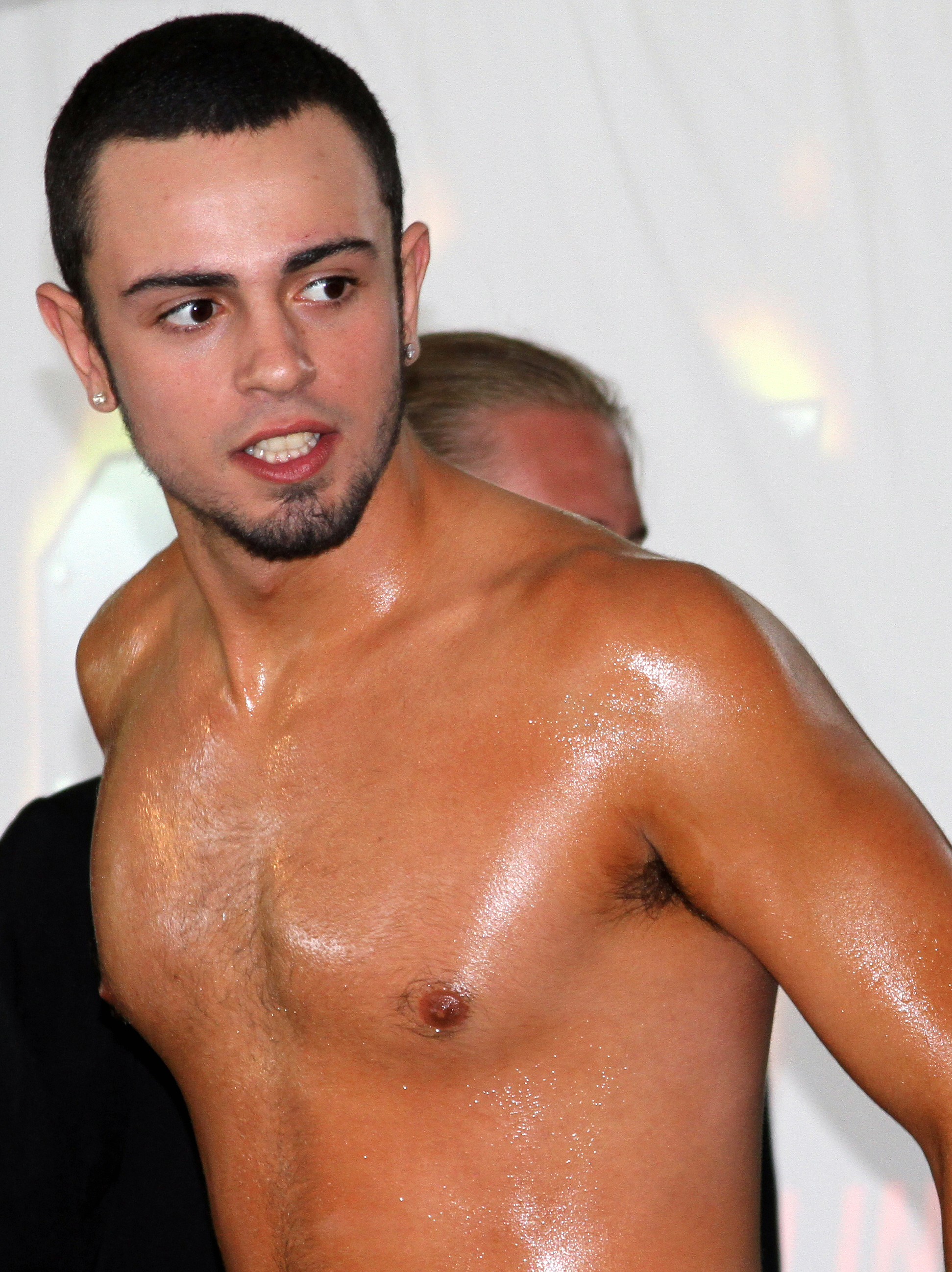
- Elia Markopoulos in 2012

Personal information
- Born: Elias Evan Markopoulos; April 13, 1994 (age 32) Hudson, Massachusetts

Professional wrestling career
- Ring name(s): Ari Cohen; Elia Markopoulos; Elia The Great; Evan Markopoulos; Evan Wallbridge
- Billed height: 6 ft 2 in (1.88 m)
- Billed weight: 205 lb (93 kg)
- Billed from: Kalamata, Greece
- Trained by: Al Snow; Killer Kowalski; OVW; Ivar
- Debut: 2008

Elias Evan Markopoulos (Greek: Ηλιας Εβαν Μαρκόπουλος; born April 13, 1994), better known by his ring name Elia Markopoulos, and sometimes referred to as Evan, is a Greek American professional wrestler from Hudson, Massachusetts. Elia wrestles on the independent circuit, mainly for Ohio Valley Wrestling in Louisville, Kentucky, and formerly in the Northeast United States. At the age of 18 Elias appeared at TNA Wrestling's TNA Gut Check in a match against Doug Williams on the September 20, 2012, episode of Impact Wrestling, making him the youngest person to appear on Impact television.

== Professional wrestling career ==
=== Early years and training ===
Markopoulos grew up in Hudson, Massachusetts. He graduated from Hudson High School in 2012. The summer after seventh grade, at the age of 13, he decided to begin professional wrestling training. In 2007 he began training at the Killer Kowalski School of Wrestling (today the New England Pro Wrestling Academy). Elia has trained under Mike Hollow, Todd Hansen, Brian Milonas, and Brian Fury. However, he credits the Chaotic Training Center as a whole, Ohio Valley Wrestling, and Al Snow as his trainers.

=== Independent circuit (2008–present) ===
Elias has worked for a number of different independent professional wrestling promotions across the Northeast United States. Elia fought his first match at the age of 14 against Nick Gamma. He has worked for such promotions as Chaotic Wrestling, New England Championship Wrestling, Millennium Wrestling Federation, Top Rope Promotions, Beyond Wrestling, NWA On Fire, CTWE, Eastern Wrestling Alliance, NWA Vintage Pro, East Coast Wrestling Association, Showcase Pro Wrestling, UFO Wrestling, PWF Northeast, and Big Time Wrestling. Markopolous stated in an interview that he considers capturing the Chaotic Wrestling New England Championship at just 15 years old his greatest achievement as a wrestler. Elia has been a standout performer in his area since 2009. Before taking on his Chaotic Wrestling alias of Elia Markopoulos, he was known as The Masked Vortex and Evan Young.

In late 2009, after winning the New England Championship with the help of Alex Arion, Elias started teamed up with Arion, a long-time heel in New England. The duo dubbed themselves the Greek Squad. The babyface team failed to capture the Chaotic Wrestling Tag Team Championship numerous times, causing Elia to turn heel on Arion in late 2011. The former tag partners then had a match at Cold Fury 10 in 2012, with Arion leaving victorious. Later in 2012, after Arion had been taken out due to injury by Elia, Markopoulos joined forces with Frankie Arion (Alex's kayfabe brother) and named themselves the Greek Squad. In August 2012 Arion returned and ultimately joined the heel faction again, though this time with Elia as the leader.

On the June 15, 2012, episode of WWE Smackdown, under the ring name Ari Cohen, Elias competed on WWE television. Elias tagged with Mike Testa, losing in a handicap match to Ryback.

On January 18, 2013, at Chaotic's first event of the year, Elias returned after a three-month hiatus and defeated Mark Shurman, and joined Sean Gorman's empire along with his former trainer Todd Hansen.

At Cold Fury 12, on March 1, 2013, Elias captured the vacant Chaotic Wrestling New England Championship in a four-way match, winning the championship for the second time in his career. He later vacated the title in early June 2013.

In July 2013 Markopoulos was kayfabe fired from Chaotic Wrestling by then heel president Sean Gorman because Markopoulos was moving to Louisville to further his wrestling training with Ohio Valley Wrestling.

Markopoulos did return to Chaotic Wrestling in April 2014.

On September 10, 2016, Markopoulos appeared on the Evolve Wrestling 68 show in Deer Park, New York.

On July 19, 2019, Markopoulos made his return after a four-month hiatus from Chaotic Wrestling, this time under the moniker Evan Wallbridge.

As of November 2021, Markopoulos has been a coach at the Top Rope Promotions Lock-up academy in Fall River, MA.

=== Total Nonstop Action Wrestling (2012) ===
Elias received national recognition after appearing as a contestant on TNA Gut Check using the ring name Evan Markopoulos. He competed in a try out against Douglas Williams on the September 20, 2012 episode of Impact Wrestling. Evan would lose and was ultimately not awarded a contract (though he was given a developmental contract). At only 18 years old, Evan became the youngest TNA Gut Check contestant ever.

On August 28, 2013, Markopoulos made his Ohio Valley Wrestling (OVW) debut as a heel in a dark match losing to Dylan Bostic. A few months after starting a friendly heel versus heel feud with Bostic, the two ended the feud and began teaming together due to their cheating and lying antics.

Markopoulos was waived from his TNA contract in June 2015.

== Championships and accomplishments ==
- Atlantic Pro Wrestling
  - APW Heavyweight Championship (2 times)
  - APW Tag-Team Championship (1 time) – with Kid V
- Chaotic Wrestling
  - Chaotic Wrestling Heavyweight Championship (1 time)
  - Chaotic Wrestling New England Championship (3 times)
  - Chase for the Gold Tournament (2017)
  - King of Chaos (2015)
- Lucky Pro Wrestling
  - LPW Tag Team Championship (1 time) – with Christian Casanova
- Pro Wrestling Illustrated
  - Ranked No. 481 of the top 500 wrestlers in the PWI 500 in 2012
  - Ranked No. 364 of the top 500 wrestlers in the PWI 500 in 2013.
- Top Rope Promotions
  - TRP Interstate Championship (1 time, current)
- ZMAK
  - ZMAK International Championship (1 time)
