= Oney Lorcan =

American professional wrestler (born 1985)

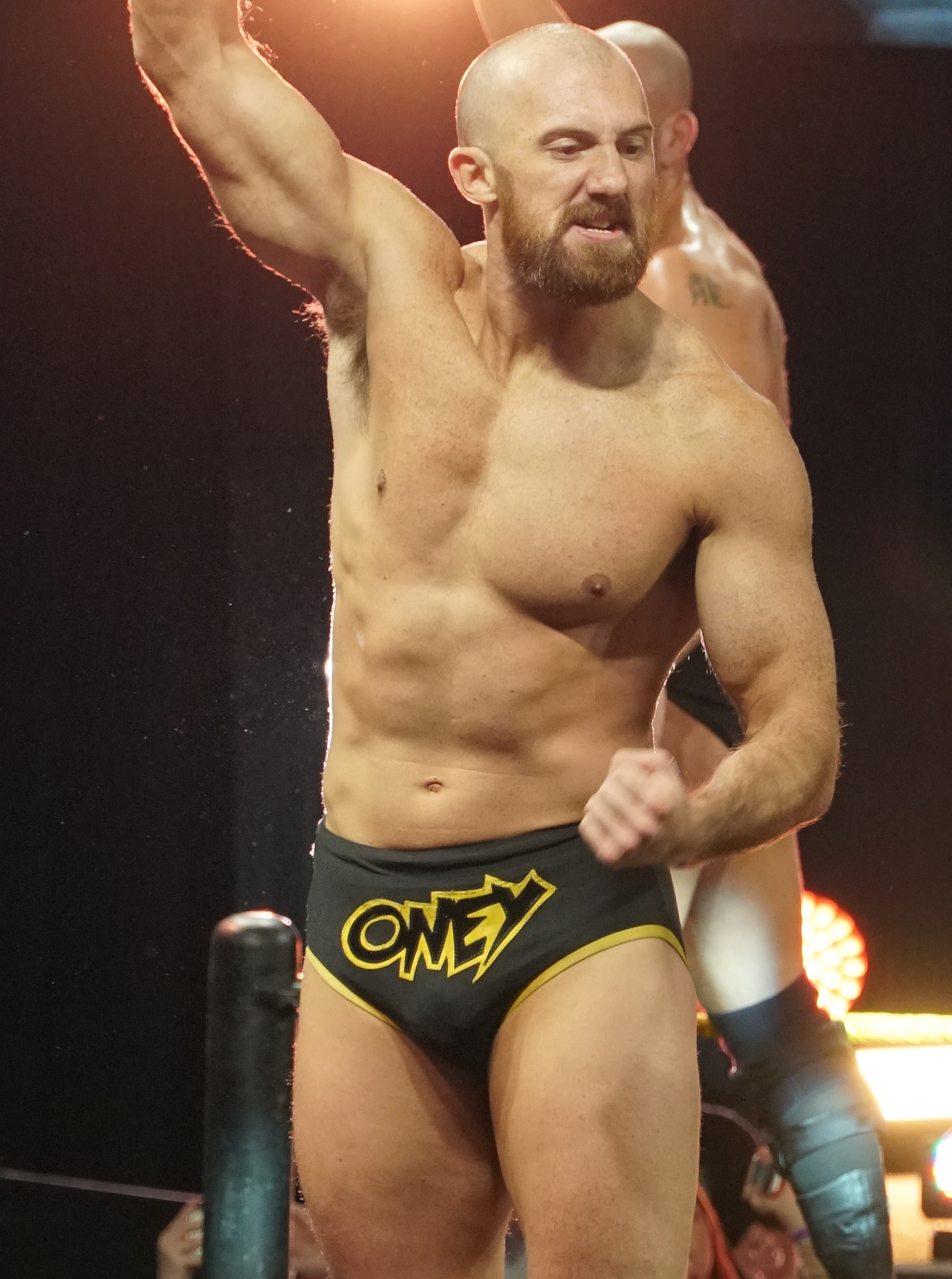
- Lorcan in 2018

Personal information
- Born: Christopher Girard; December 21, 1985 (age 40) Walpole, Massachusetts, U.S.

Professional wrestling career
- Ring name(s): Biff Busick; The Carolina Panther; Christopher Girard; Frank O'Rourke; Girard St. Christopher; Oney Lorcan; Vortex
- Billed height: 6 ft 1 in (185 cm)
- Billed weight: 190 lb (86 kg)
- Billed from: Boston, Massachusetts
- Trained by: Chaotic Wrestling; Lance Storm; WWE Performance Center
- Debut: 2008
- Retired: 2023

Christopher Girard (born December 21, 1985) is an American retired professional wrestler. He is signed to WWE as a coach at the Performance Center as well as a producer for NXT, having previously performed on said brand under the ring name Oney Lorcan. He is a former NXT Tag Team Champion with Danny Burch. He has worked frequently for independent promotions including Combat Zone Wrestling (CZW), Pro Wrestling Guerrilla (PWG), Top Rope Promotions (TRP), and Chaotic Wrestling (CW) under the ring name Biff Busick. He is a one-time CZW World Heavyweight Champion. In addition, he has appeared in notable independent promotions like Westside Xtreme Wrestling (wXw), Evolve, and Dragon Gate USA (DGUSA).

== Early life ==
Christopher Girard was born on December 21, 1985, in Boston, Massachusetts.

== Professional wrestling career ==
=== Early career (2008–2012) ===
Girard began training at the Chaotic Training Center in August 2008. After two years of training and working for Chaotic Wrestling, he moved to Calgary, Alberta, Canada and Lorcan enrolled in the Storm Wrestling Academy in September 2010. After training with Lance Storm for three months, he moved to Dallas, Texas, and received additional training from Sho Funaki.

=== Combat Zone Wrestling (2012–2015) ===
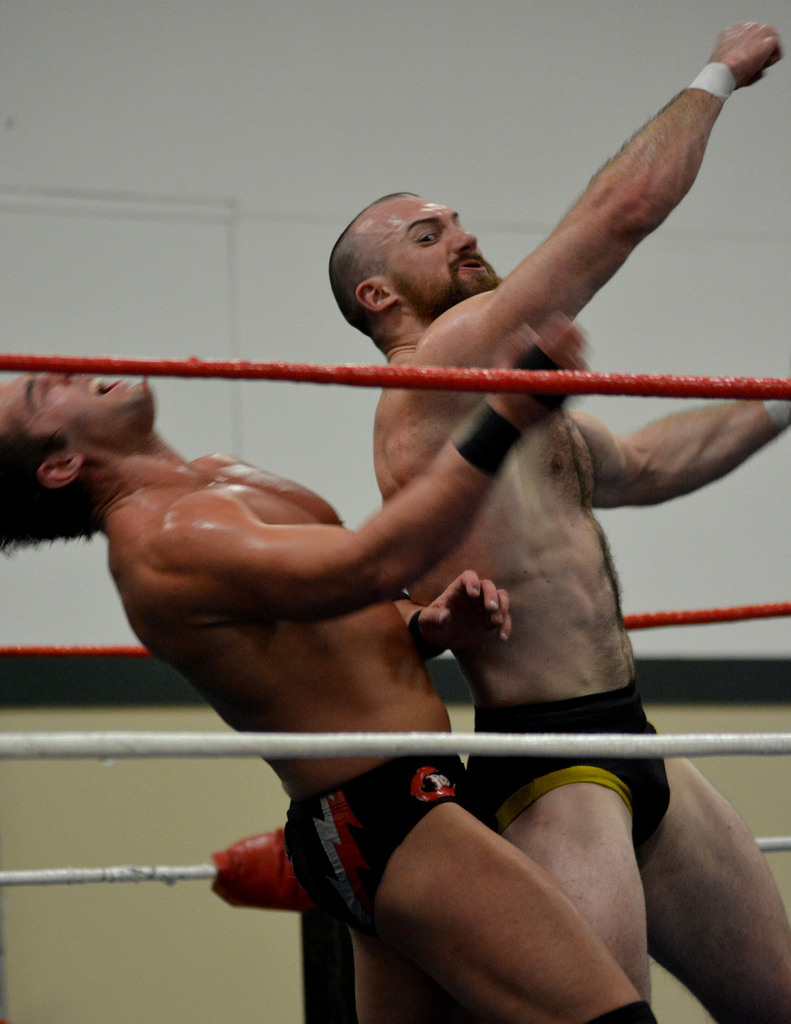
Biff Busick uppercuts Roderick Strong at an XWA event

Using the ring name Biff Busick, he debuted in Combat Zone Wrestling at CZW Cerebral, on October 13, 2012, in a dark match and he joined The Front. Busick gained exposure in 2014 at the CZW Best of the Best XIII tournament, where Busick defeated Azrieal, Caleb Konley, and Chuck Taylor to advance to the finals. However, Busick was defeated by Drake Younger. Next, Busick feuded with the CZW World Heavyweight Champion Drew Gulak. At CZW To Infinity, on April 27, 2014, Busick was defeated by Gulak in a title match. The following month, at CZW Proving Grounds, Busick defeated Gulak to win the CZW World Heavyweight Championship. Over 161 days, Busick defended the title against wrestlers including Danny Havoc, Mike Bailey, and Dave Crist. At CZW Tangled Web 7, Bussick defeated Chris Dickinson to retain the title. After the match, his stablemate Sozio turned on him and challenged him to a match. Sozio defeated Busick to win the title. On November 11, 2014, at CZW Cerebral, Busick challenged Sozio for the title in a No Rope Barbed Wire match, but he was defeated. At CZW Cage of Death XVI, Busick participated in a four-way Cage of Death match for the title against Sozio, BLK Jeez, and Drew Gulak, but the match was won by Jeez.

=== Evolve (2013–2015) ===
Busick made his debut in Evolve at "Evolve 23" winning a four-way elimination match against Green Ant, Josh Alexander, and Maxwell Chicago advancing in the "Style Battle 2013 Tournament". At "Evolve 24" Busick was defeated by Drew Gulak in the finals of the "Style Battle 2013 Tournament". At "Evolve 28", Busick defeated Drew Gulak. From November 10 to 16, 2014, Evolve's parent company, WWNLive, held four events in a ten-day tour of China. Busick ended the tour with a record of 2 wins (against Timothy Thatcher and Jody Kristofferson) and 2 losses (to Johnny Gargano and Thatcher).

=== Pro Wrestling Guerrilla (2014–2015) ===
On August 29, 2014, Busick made his debut for Pro Wrestling Guerrilla (PWG), participating in their annual Battle of Los Angeles tournament losing to Roderick Strong in the first round. He also wrestled the following night teaming with Drew Gulak coming up short against ReDRagon. He returned the following show at Untitled II losing to Tommaso Ciampa and Black Cole Sun losing a four-way to Brian Cage which also involved Uhaa Nation and Ciampa. On February 27, 2015, at From Out of Nowhere, Busick picked up his first win in PWG by defeating old rival "Speedball" Mike Bailey, before losing to Brian Cage at Don't Sweat the Technique. He also reunited with Gulak to compete in DDT4 losing in the first round to Ricochet and Rich Swann. He appeared at Mystery Vortex III defeating Timothy Thatcher before getting into a confrontation with the newly formed Mount Rushmore 2.0 and specifically Super Dragon before getting superkicked by The Young Bucks. He then participated in the 2015 Battle of Los Angeles defeating Andrew Everett in the first round. The following night, he would team with Everett and Trevor Lee in a losing effort against Super Dragon and The Young Bucks in the first six-man tag team Guerilla Warfare match. He would then wrestle his final PWG match losing to Chris Hero the next night in the second round.

=== WWE ===
==== Sporadic appearances (2015–2017) ====
Girard appeared on January 1, 2010, episode of SmackDown under the ring name The Carolina Panther, losing to The Great Khali. He also appeared on the October 10, 2011 episode of Raw and October 28, 2011, episode of SmackDown, as a paper bags assistant during Cody Rhodes' undashing gimmick.

On September 1, 2015, it was reported that Girard had signed a developmental contract with WWE and would be reporting to NXT the following month. He made his debut at an NXT house show on October 30, in a Halloween battle royal, which was won by Bayley. On January 9, 2016, he made his singles match debut under his real name, losing to Rich Swann. At a set of television tapings held on January 22, he made his televised debut (which aired on February 24), in a losing effort against Apollo Crews. He then wrestled in a dark match before NXT TakeOver: Dallas, where he lost to Manny Andrade. In June, Girard debuted the new ring name Oney Lorcan.

==== Teaming with Danny Burch (2017–2021) ====
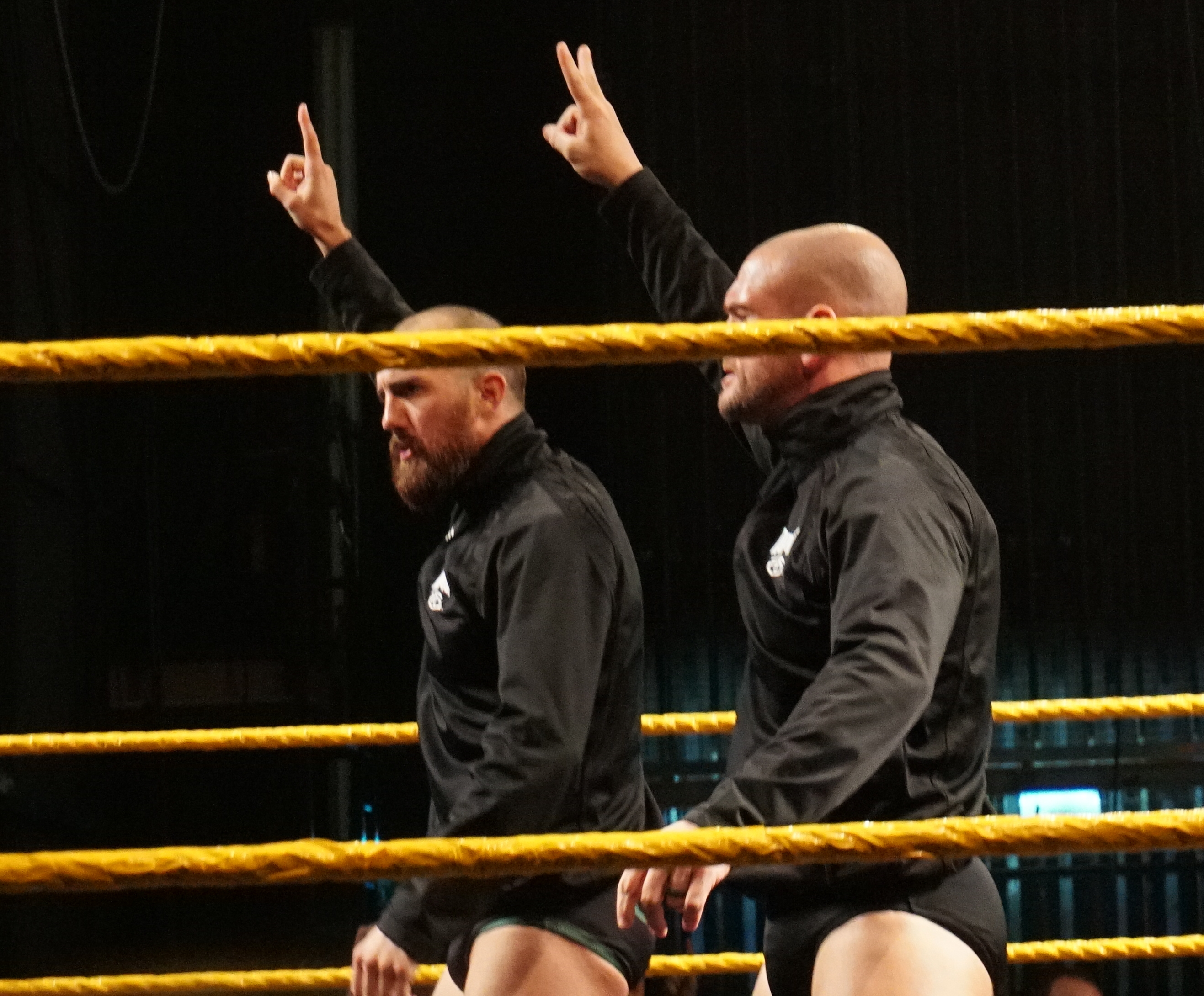
Lorcan (left) and Danny Burch performing their signature pose in June 2018

From August, Lorcan feuded with Danny Burch; after the two traded victories, they formed a tag team and feuded with Riddick Moss and Tino Sabbatelli. In early 2018, they took part in the Dusty Rhodes Tag Team Classic, but were eliminated in the first round by team of Roderick Strong and Pete Dunne. Lorcan suffered an orbital bone fracture during his tag team match with Burch against The Undisputed Era (Kyle O'Reilly and Roderick Strong) at NXT Takeover: Chicago, requiring facial surgery. Lorcan returned two months to the day of his injury on August 16, losing to War Raiders at an NXT live event. Lorcan spent the latter part of 2018 bouncing between the NXT and NXT UK brands. In February 2019, Lorcan and Burch were participants in the Dusty Rhodes Tag Team Classic tournament, but were eliminated in the first round by The Forgotten Sons.

In March 2019, Lorcan took part in a tournament on 205 Live to name a challenger for the WWE Cruiserweight Championship at WrestleMania 35. He defeated Humberto Carrillo in the first round, but lost to Cedric Alexander in the second round. On March 26, 2019, it was announced that he was moving to the 205 Live brand, but would still wrestle for NXT. He then redebuted on that night's episode of 205 Live, costing Alexander a match against Ariya Daivari and attacking him after the match, establishing himself as a heel in the process. On the April 16 episode of 205 Live, he defeated Alexander in Alexander's final match on 205 Live. After the match, Lorcan shook Alexander's hand as a sign of respect, turning Lorcan face in the process.

On the September 18 episode of NXT, Lorcan was defeated by Lio Rush in a number one contender's match for the Cruiserweight Championship. On December 6, 2019, Oney Lorcan announced on his Twitter that he signed a multi-year contract with WWE. On the February 13, 2020 episode of NXT UK, Lorcan teamed up with Danny Burch in a tag team match defeating The Hunt (Primate and Wild Boar). They then teamed up again on the February 13 episode of NXT UK in a non-title match against the NXT UK Tag Team Champions Gallus (Mark Coffey and Wolfgang) but failed to beat them. On the May 20 episode of NXT, Lorcan and Burch defeated Ever-Rise and proceeded to call out the NXT Tag Team Champions Imperium (Marcel Barthel and Fabian Aichner) afterwards by mocking their signature pose. The following week, they challenged them for the NXT Tag Team Championship, but were defeated by Breezango (Tyler Breeze and Fandango) in a number one contender's match.

On the October 21 episode of NXT, after Undisputed Era members Bobby Fish and Roderick Strong were taken out, Lorcan and Burch replaced them in an NXT Tag Team Championship match. They won the titles by defeating Breezango (Tyler Breeze and Fandango) with help from Pat McAfee, turning heel for the second time in his WWE career. On March 23, 2021, William Regal vacated the NXT Tag Team Championship after Burch suffered a shoulder injury in a title defense vs Finn Balor and Karrion Kross on the March 17, 2021 edition of NXT. They failed to reclaim the titles against new champions, MSK, on the September 7 edition of NXT. After "NXT 2.0" debuted the following week, Burch was taken off television, ending the team with Lorcan. Lorcan wrestled his final match in a losing effort against Xyon Quinn in October, before being released in November.

==== Coaching role and in-ring retirement (2022–present) ====
On 8 October 2022, it was announced that Lorcan returned to WWE as a coach at their Performance Center. In 2023, Girard confirmed that he had retired from in-ring competition.

== Other media ==
As Oney Lorcan, he made his video game debut as a playable character in WWE 2K19 and also appears in WWE 2K20 and WWE 2K22. The NHL's Washington Capitals used his WWE song "Combative" by CFO$ as its official goal song from 2017 to 2019.

== Championships and accomplishments ==
- Beyond Wrestling
  - Greatest Rivals Round Robin Tournament (2015)
  - Tournament For Tomorrow 3:16 (2014) – with Drew Gulak
- Combat Zone Wrestling
  - CZW World Heavyweight Championship (1 time)
- Premier Wrestling Federation Northeast
  - PWF Northeast Lightning Cup Championship (1 time)
- Pro Wrestling Illustrated
  - Ranked No. 157 of the top 500 singles wrestlers in the PWI 500 in 2014
- River City Wrestling
  - RCW Championship (1 time)
- Top Rope Promotions
  - TRP Heavyweight Championship (1 time)
  - TRP Interstate Championship (1 time)
  - TRP Kowalski Cup Tournament (2013)
- Wrestling Is Respect
  - Quest to the Best (2013)
- WWE
  - NXT Tag Team Championship (1 time) – with Danny Burch
