= Caylen Croft =

American retired professional wrestler (born 1980)

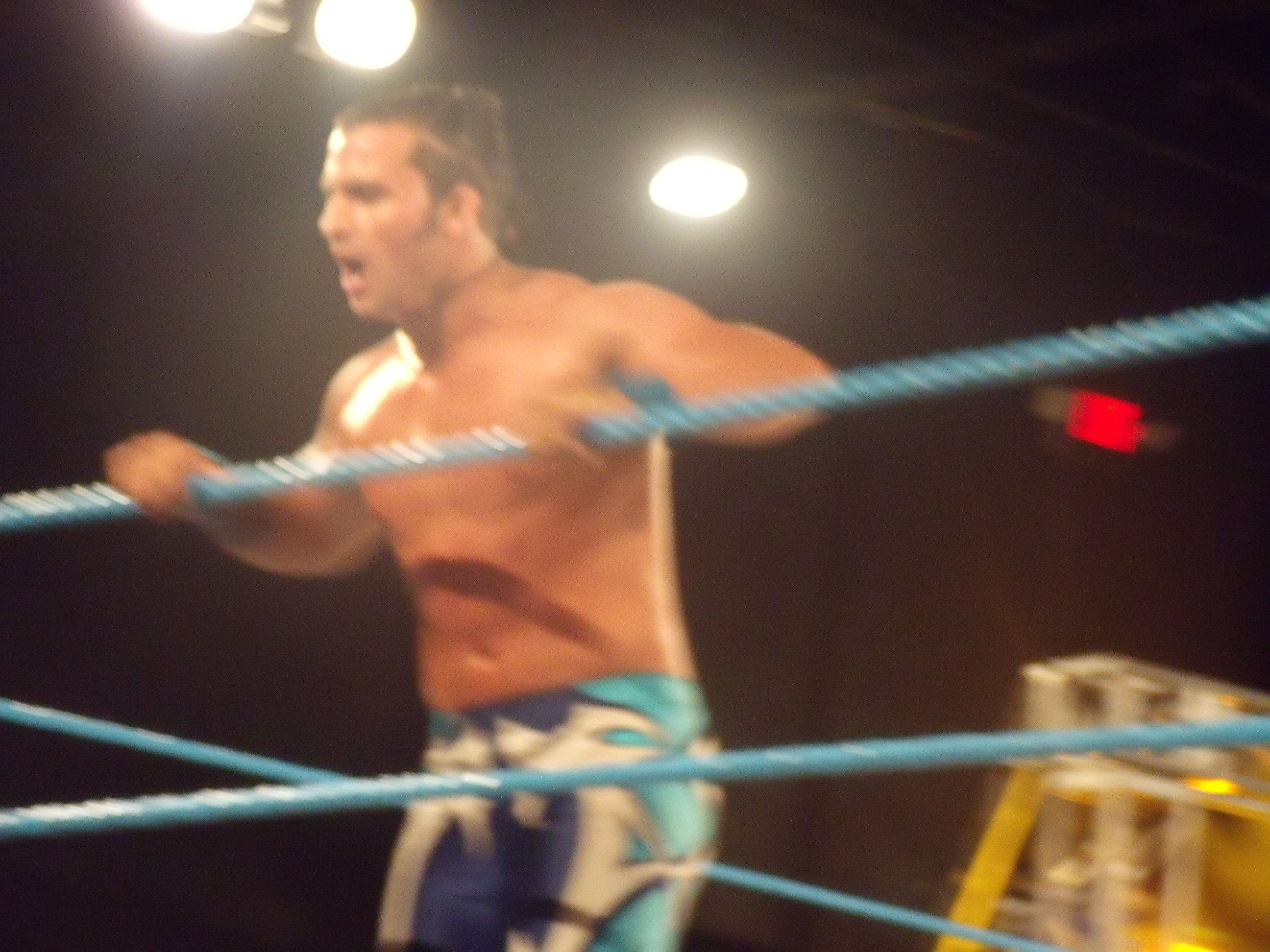
- Croft in 2009

Personal information
- Born: Kris Pavone; May 2, 1980 (age 46) Youngstown, Ohio, U.S.
- Education: Youngstown State University

Professional wrestling career
- Ring name(s): Caylen Croft; Chris Banks; Chris Cage; Chris Pavone; French Man Deux
- Billed height: 5 ft 11 in (1.80 m)
- Billed weight: 210 lb (95 kg)
- Trained by: Nightmare Danny Davis; Nick Dinsmore
- Debut: 2001
- Retired: November 19, 2010

Kris Pavone (born May 2, 1980) is an American retired professional wrestler. He is best known for his time in World Wrestling Entertainment (WWE), where he wrestled under the ring name Caylen Croft. He was one half of the DudeBusters tag team with Trent Barreta.

Pavone debuted in 2001 using the name Chris Cage. After two years on the independent circuit, he signed a contract with World Wrestling Entertainment (WWE) and was assigned to the Ohio Valley Wrestling (OVW) territory. In OVW, he won the Southern Tag Team Championship four times (three times with Tank Toland and once with Mike Mizanin) and the Heavyweight Championship once. He was released from his WWE developmental contract in March 2006 before being re-signed in 2008. He competed for the Florida Championship Wrestling developmental territory, where he won the FCW Florida Tag Team Championship twice, and debuted for the ECW brand in December 2009.

== Professional wrestling career ==
=== Early career (1999–2003) ===
Pavone made his debut in 2001 as a student of Nightmare Danny Davis and Nick Dinsmore. Within two years, he appeared at the ECWA Super 8 Tournament in April 2003 and began competing in Ohio Valley Wrestling (OVW) several weeks later.

=== World Wrestling Entertainment (2003–2006) ===
After forming a brief tag team with Nova, using the ring name Chris Cage, Pavone later teamed up with Tank Toland to form Adrenaline. Together, they went on to win the OVW Southern Tag Team Championship three times during 2003 and 2004. He later won his first and only OVW Heavyweight Championship after defeating Matt Morgan, before losing it a few months later to Chad Toland, the on-screen cousin of his tag partner Tank. He later won his fourth and final OVW Southern Tag Team Championship, this time with newcomer Mike Mizanin. Together, they feuded with the Toland Cousins (Tank and Chad) and The Throwbacks. Pavone, however, was released from his contract due to behavior problems, leaving Mizanin to defend and ultimately lose the Tag Team Championship to The Throwbacks.

Pavone would return to OVW and the independents. In 2007, he worked for Ring Of Honor.

=== Return to WWE (2008–2010) ===
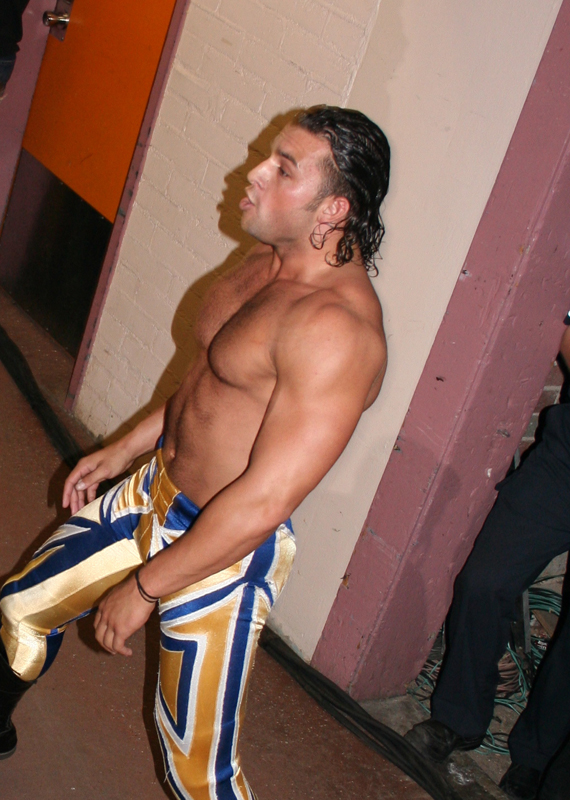
Pavone in FCW as Caylen Croft

After wrestling on the independent circuit, including a one-time appearance in Ring of Honor, throughout 2006 and 2007, Pavone was re-signed to a development deal by WWE, and he began working in their development territory Florida Championship Wrestling (FCW) under the name Caylen Croft. Soon after debuting in FCW, he formed a tag team with Trent Barreta called The Dude Busters. On May 30, 2009, Barreta and Croft won the FCW Florida Tag Team Championship from Tyler Reks in a handicap match when his partner Johnny Curtis failed to appear. On July 23, Croft and Barreta lost the championship to Justin Angel and Kris Logan. On November 19, Croft won his second FCW Florida Tag Team Championship, this time with Curt Hawkins, after they defeated The Rotundos (Bo and Duke). While they were champions, Croft and Hawkins would defend the title with Barreta via the Freebird Rule. On January 14, 2010, at an FCW television taping, the Dude Busters lost the Florida Tag Team Championship to The Fortunate Sons (Brett DiBiase and Joe Hennig).

On the December 1, 2009 episode of ECW on SyFy, Croft and Barreta, no longer using the Dude Busters name, debuted as villains, defeating Tyler Hilton and Bobby Shields, two local competitors. The duo would then feud with Goldust and Yoshi Tatsu, which culminated in a loss to Goldust and Tatsu in a match to determine the number one contenders to the Unified WWE Tag Team Championship on the February 9, 2010 episode of ECW.

When the ECW brand ended in February 2010, its roster became free agents. Barreta and Croft signed with SmackDown, making their debut for the brand on February 19 in a losing effort against Cryme Tyme. Baretta and Croft would then feud with The Hart Dynasty, but could never manage a win against them. In April, they began using their Dude Busters name again, which they had seemingly dropped since debuting in ECW.

The Dude Busters then turned face when they entered into a feud with the Gatecrashers (Curt Hawkins and Vance Archer) in August. The Dude Busters then earned their first tag team victory since joining the SmackDown roster when they defeated the Gatecrashers on the August 26 episode of Superstars. On November 19, 2010, Pavone was released from his contract. He retired from professional wrestling shortly after.

== Personal life ==
Pavone grew up in Youngstown, Ohio. He was influenced by Bret Hart and Shawn Michaels. Pavone attended Youngstown State University graduating with a Bachelor of Arts. After leaving WWE, Pavone became an elementary school art teacher in the Hillsborough County School District in Florida. Pavone is also the illustrator and author of the children's book No Beard The Pirate.

== Championships and accomplishments ==
- Florida Championship Wrestling
  - FCW Florida Tag Team Championship (2 times) – with Trent Barreta (2) and Curt Hawkins (1)^{[a]}
- Funkin' Conservatory
  - FC Tag Team Championship (1 time) – with Sterling James Keenan
- Ohio Valley Wrestling
  - OVW Heavyweight Championship (1 time)
  - OVW Southern Tag Team Championship (4 times) – with Tank Toland (3) and The Miz (1)
  - Blueprint Invitational (2005)
- Pro Wrestling Illustrated
  - PWI ranked him #133 of the 500 best singles wrestlers of the PWI 500 in 2004

== Footnotes ==
^{1} During his reign with Hawkins, Croft could defend the title with either Hawkins or Barreta under the Freebird Rule.
