= Top Rope Promotions =

Professional wrestling promotion

- Acronym: TRP
- Founded: 1981
- Style: Professional wrestling
- Headquarters: New Bedford, Massachusetts (1996–2000); Fall River, Massachusetts (2000–2017)
- Founder: Joe Eugenio
- Owner: Steve Ricard (2000–2017)
- Formerly: Yankee Pro Wrestling (1994–2004); South Coast Championship Wrestling; New England Wrestling (1988–1994); Whaling City Wrestling (1981–1984)
- Website: www.topropepromotions.com

Top Rope Promotions (formerly known as Yankee Pro Wrestling and South Coast Championship Wrestling) is a North Eastern independent professional wrestling promotion based in New Bedford, Massachusetts and is the largest promotion in the Southern New England area rivaling other North Eastern promotions including Chaotic Wrestling, the Millennium Wrestling Federation and New England Championship Wrestling. Along with its former head trainer Matt Hyson (Spike Dudley), their seminars have been hosted by Ring of Honor alumni Jamie Noble and A.J. Styles. A number of independent wrestling stars have competed in Top Rope Pro Wrestling during their careers including Amanda Storm, Andy Jaxx, D. C. Drake, Slyck Wagner Brown, Johnny Heartbreaker, Shark Boy, Christian York, The Metal Maniac, Robbie Ellis, Rick Fuller, Dan "The Beast" Severn, Anthony Greene, and "Brutal" Bob Evans.

Following the close of Extreme Championship Wrestling, several ECW mainstays such as Amish Roadkill, Dawn Marie, Simon Diamond, Perry Saturn, Tony DeVito, Little Guido, Jerry Lynn, Steve Corino, Justin Credible, Julio Dinero, Chris Hamrick, Big Dick Dudley and Joel Gertner had brief stints in the promotion. In recent years, TNA wrestlers Christy Hemme, Talia, Abyss, Jay Lethal, Joey Matthews, Ron "The Truth" Killings, Bubba Ray Dudley, and D-Von Dudley have also made appearances.

== History ==
The promotion began holding events in the Fall River-New Bedford area during the early-1980s, picking up the old territorial area previously run by the World Wide Wrestling Federation during the 1970s. After going through several name changes and owners, the promotion changed its name from New England Wrestling Association to Yankee Pro Wrestling during the 1990s. During this time, the promotion gained a strong following in southern New England regularly bringing in former WWF stars from the 1980s and 90s.

The promotion was purchased by head booker Steve Ricard in 2000. Under the Top Rope Promotions banner, he continued running monthly shows in the Fall River-New Bedford area as both Yankee Pro Wrestling and South Coast Championship Wrestling, successfully making between $500–$5,000 a show. The majority of its shows are held at the PAL Hall in Fall River, Massachusetts and the Top Rope Arena in New Bedford, Massachusetts. The promotion also ran a weekly cable television program in the local area. In 2007, the names Yankee Pro Wrestling and South Coast Championship Wrestling ceased to be used and all events were now exclusively under the name Top Rope Promotions.

In addition to monthly events at the PAL Hall in Fall River, Top Rope Promotions runs events at the Creative Auction Centers in Fall River and New Bedford, the Adams-Turners Hall in Adams and the Elks Lodge in Franklin. Top Rope Promotions also appears at the annual Whaling City Festival at Buttonwood Park in New Bedford and at the annual Wolcott Country Fair in Wolcott, Connecticut. The promotion also holds annual events at Outdoor World campground in Sturbridge, Massachusetts.

The Lock-Up Wrestling School

The school was founded by Top Rope Promotions owner Steve Ricard and former head trainer Matt Hyson (formerly known as Spike Dudley) in 2005. Hyson had been the school's head trainer from 2005 to 2013, The school is responsible for training several independent stars such as Teddy Goodz, T. K. O'Ryan, former Ring of Honor Television Champion, former Ring of Honor Tag Team Champion, former IWGP Tag Team Champion Matt Taven and Ring of Honor wrestler Vinny Marseglia. Top Rope Promotions veteran "H2O" Ryan Waters became one of the school's trainers in 2013 after Hyson left the promotion. In 2021 Lock-up graduate Nico Silva and New England veteran Elia Markopoulos joined Waters as co-trainers. In 2022, both Ryan Waters and Nico Silva stepped down as trainers, making Elia Markopoulos head trainer. In July 2023 Bob Evans became a trainer at the Lock-Up.

== Championships and accomplishments ==
Championship	Current champion(s)	Date won	Event	Previous champion(s)	Days held	Notes
TRP Heavyweight Championship	"Heavy Metalweight" Moshpit	April 19, 2024	Spring Fling 2024	”World Class” Channing Thomas	565+ days	
TRP Interstate Championship	"Kid USA" Jay Jailet	May 23, 2026	May Mayhem 2026	”The Great” Elia Markopoulos	1+ days	
TRP Tag Team Championship	Guapo Suave (Diego Alvarez and Lex Lozano)	May 9, 2025	Spring Retaliation 2025	Tough Guy Inc	179+ Days	

=== Accomplishments ===
Accomplishment	Previous winner	Date won	Event	Notes
Spindle City Rumble	Moshpit	December 27, 2024	Spindle City Rumble: Rise and Fall	
Kowalski Cup	PPH{Portuguese Power House}	November 15, 2024	Kowalski Cup Tournament: 18th Annual	
Gold Rush	Moshpit	July 14, 2023	Summer Showdown 2023	None Since

== See also ==
- List of independent wrestling promotions in the United States
