= Chaotic Wrestling Heavyweight Championship =

Professional wrestling championship

- Current design of the championship

Details
- Promotion: Chaotic Wrestling
- Date established: September 17, 2000
- Current champion: Tyree Taylor
- Date won: August 7, 2026
Statistics
- First champion: Jay Jailette
- Most reigns: J. T. Dunn (4 reigns)
- Longest reign: Chase Del Monte (517 days)
- Shortest reign: Sean Burke (<1 days)

The Chaotic Wrestling (CW) Heavyweight Championship is a professional wrestling championship in Chaotic Wrestling. The current champion is Tyree Taylor, who is in his first reign.

== Title history ==
Jay Jaillet became the inaugural champion after defeating Donnie Rotten on September 17, 2000. Chase Del Monte's third reign is the longest at 517 days, while Sean Burke's second reign is the shortest at less than a day. J.T. Dunn holds the record for having the most reigns at four.

Key
| No. | Overall reign number |
| Reign | Reign number for the specific champion |
| Days | Number of days held |
| + | Current reign is changing daily |

| No. | Champion | Championship change | | | Reign statistics | | Notes | Ref. |
| No. | Champion | Date | Event | Location | Reign | Days | Notes | Ref. |
|---|---|---|---|---|---|---|---|---|
| 1 | Jay Jaillet | September 17, 2000 | Chaotic Wrestling | Worcester, MA | 1 | 33 | Jaillet defeated Donnie Rotten to become the inaugural champion. | |
| 2 | Gino Martino | October 20, 2000 | Chaotic Wrestling | Worcester, MA | 1 | 210 | | |
| 3 | Rick Fuller | May 18, 2001 | Chaotic Wrestling | Revere, MA | 1 | 42 | | |
| 4 | Gino Martino | June 29, 2001 | Chaotic Wrestling | Revere, MA | 2 | 70 | | |
| 5 | Ronnie D. Lishus | September 7, 2001 | Chaotic Wrestling | Lawrence, MA | 1 | 98 | | |
| 6 | Luis Ortiz | December 14, 2001 | Cold Fury 1 | Lawrence, MA | 1 | 155 | This was a lumberjack match. | |
| 7 | Aaron Stevens | May 18, 2002 | Chaotic Wrestling | Methuen, MA | 1 | 90 | | |
| 8 | John Walters | August 16, 2002 | Chaotic Wrestling | Methuen, MA | 1 | 232 | | |
| 9 | Luis Ortiz | April 5, 2003 | Breaking Point | Methuen, MA | 2 | 126 | Tom Prichard served as the special guest referee. | |
| 10 | Billy Kryptonite | August 9, 2003 | Summer Chaos | Tewksbury, MA | 1 | 160 | This was a last man standing match. | |
| 11 | John Walters | January 16, 2004 | Chaotic Wrestling | Methuen, MA | 2 | 56 | This was a loser leaves Chaotic Wrestling match. | |
| 12 | Arch Kincaid | March 12, 2004 | Chaotic Wrestling | Methuen, MA | 1 | 105 | | |
| 13 | Maverick Wild | June 25, 2004 | Chaotic Wrestling | Lowell, MA | 1 | 266 | | |
| 14 | Brian Black | March 18, 2005 | Chaotic Wrestling | Methuen, MA | 1 | 77 | | |
| — | Vacated | June 3, 2005 | Breaking Point | Lowell, MA | — | — | The championship was declared vacant after Brian Black was signed to World Wrestling Entertainment (WWE). | |
| 15 | Mike Kruel | June 3, 2005 | Breaking Point | Lowell, MA | 1 | 98 | Kruel defeated Handsome Johnny in the finals of an eight-man tournament to win the vacant championship. | |
| 16 | Handsome Johnny | September 9, 2005 | Chaotic Wrestling | Methuen, MA | 1 | 252 | | |
| 17 | Thomas Penmanship | May 19, 2006 | Chaotic Wrestling | Methuen, MA | 1 | 259 | | |
| 18 | Brian Milonas | February 2, 2007 | Cold Fury 6: Into the Fire | Lowell, MA | 1 | 217 | This was a loser leaves Chaotic Wrestling match. | |
| 19 | Bryan Logan | September 7, 2007 | Summer Chaos | Lowell, MA | 1 | 98 | | |
| 20 | Handsome Johnny | December 14, 2007 | Chaotic Wrestling | Lowell, MA | 2 | 56 | | |
| 21 | Bryan Logan | February 8, 2008 | Cold Fury 7 | Lowell, MA | 2 | 119 | This was a three-way match also involving Brian Milonas. Thomas Penmanship served as the special guest referee. | |
| 22 | Alex Arion | June 6, 2008 | Chaotic Wrestling | Lowell, MA | 1 | 245 | This was a winner takes all match in which Arion also defended the New England Championship. | |
| 23 | Chase Del Monte | February 6, 2009 | Cold Fury 8: Infinite Possibilities | Lowell, MA | 1 | 378 | | |
| 24 | Brian Milonas | February 19, 2010 | Cold Fury 9: The Never-ending Chase | Lowell, MA | 2 | 490 | | |
| 25 | Handsome Johnny | June 24, 2011 | Breaking Point | Woburn, MA | 3 | 61 | This was a three-way match, which also involving Brian Fury. | |
| — | Vacated | August 24, 2011 | — | — | — | — | | |
| 26 | Mikaze | September 9, 2011 | Chaotic Wrestling | Lowell, MA | 1 | 168 | Defeated Max Bauer to win the vacant championship. | |
| 27 | Brian Fury | February 24, 2012 | Cold Fury 11 | Lowell, MA | 1 | 259 | | |
| 28 | Sean Burke | November 9, 2012 | Chaotic Wrestling | Lowell, MA | 1 | 61 | | |
| — | Vacated | January 9, 2013 | — | — | — | — | The championship was vacated after Sean Burke suffered a leg injury. | |
| 29 | Brian Milonas | March 1, 2013 | Cold Fury 12: All Or Nothing | Lowell, MA | 3 | 189 | Defeated Brian Fury and Todd Hanson in a three-way ladder match to win the vacant championship. | |
| 30 | Sean Burke | September 6, 2013 | Chaotic Wrestling | Lowell, MA | 2 | <1 | | |
| 31 | Mark Shurman | September 6, 2013 | Chaotic Wrestling | Lowell, MA | 1 | 196 | Shurman cashed in his contract on Sean Burke, who has just defeated Brian Milonas and was subsequently subdued. | |
| 32 | Brian Fury | March 21, 2014 | Cold Fury 13 | Dracut, MA | 2 | 71 | This was a three-way match, which also involving Scotty Slade. | |
| 33 | Mark Shurman | May 31, 2014 | Chaotic Wrestling | Stoneham, MA | 2 | 146 | Brian Fury originally pinned Shurman after a title belt shot to the head. The referee restarted the match after Stoneham football coaches told him what happened. | |
| 34 | Donovan Dijak | October 24, 2014 | A Chaotic Halloween | Lowell, MA | 1 | 148 | | |
| 35 | Chase Del Monte | March 21, 2015 | Cold Fury 14: Divide and Conquer | Dracut, MA | 2 | 174 | | |
| 36 | Julian Starr | March 21, 2015 | Chaotic Wrestling | Woburn, MA | 1 | 36 | | |
| 37 | Chase Del Monte | October 17, 2015 | Breaking Point | Stoneham, MA | 3 | 517 | This was a four-way match, which also involving Adam Booker and Donovan Dijak. | |
| 38 | Elia Markopoulos | March 17, 2017 | Cold Fury 16: Unstoppable | Haverhill, MA | 1 | 364 | This was a No Disqualification match. | |
| 39 | J. T. Dunn | March 16, 2018 | Cold Fury 17: Resurrection | Haverhill, MA | 1 | 378 | | |
| 40 | Christian Casanova | March 29, 2019 | Elevated | Woburn, MA | 1 | 112 | | |
| 41 | Anthony Greene | July 19, 2019 | Elevated | Lowell, MA | 1 | 42 | | |
| 42 | Christian Casanova | August 30, 2019 | Summer Chaos | Haverhill, MA | 2 | 489 | | |
| 43 | Mike Verna | December 30, 2020 | New Years Eve: Reloaded | North Andover, MA | 1 | 113 | This was a four-way match also involving Max Smashmaster and Tripleicious. | |
| 44 | J. T. Dunn | April 22, 2021 | Reloaded | North Andover, MA | 2 | 127 | | |
| 45 | Davienne | August 27, 2021 | Summer Chaos | Burlington, MA | 1 | 140 | | |
| 46 | J. T. Dunn | January 14, 2022 | Pandemonium | Burlington, MA | 3 | 91 | | |
| 47 | Davienne | April 15, 2022 | Cold Fury XX | Lowell, MA | 2 | 245 | This was a steel cage match. | |
| 48 | The Mecca | December 16, 2022 | Dead End | Tewksbury, MA | 1 | 91 | This was a four-way elimination match also involving Anthony Greene and Brad Cashew. | |
| 49 | Brad Cashew | March 17, 2023 | Cold Fury XXI: Out For Blood | Haverhill, MA | 1 | 126 | | |
| 50 | The Mecca | July 21, 2023 | On Anarchy's Doorstep | Watertown, MA | 2 | 112 | | |
| 51 | Aaron Rourke | November 10, 2023 | Breaking Point 2023 | Lowell, MA | 1 | 126 | This was a strap match. | |
| — | Vacated | March 2024 | Unknown | — | — | — | | |
| 52 | Danny Miles | March 15, 2024 | Cold Fury XXII | Lowell, MA | 1 | 105 | Defeated J.T. Dunn for the vacant championship. | |
| 53 | J.T. Dunn | June 28, 2024 | Chaotic Countdown 2024 | Lowell, MA | 4 | 143 | | |
| 54 | Ricky Smokes | November 15, 2024 | Breaking Point 2024 | Andover, MA | 1 | 133 | This was Smokes's Chaotic Countdown cash-in. | |
| 55 | Mortar | March 28, 2025 | Cold Fury XXIII | Lowell, MA | 1 | 294 | | |
| 56 | Armani Kayos | January 16, 2026 | Pandemonium 2026 | Lowell, MA | 1 | 203 | Defeated Mortar, Ricky Smokes, Tyree Taylor, Kalvin Dumont, and Shannon Levangie in a Pandemonium match. | |
| 57 | Tyree Taylor | August 7, 2026 | Under Siege | Malden, MA | 1 | 106+ | At the beginning of the show, Taylor took out Kayos backstage and threw him through the entrance way. Taylor then successfully cashed in his Chaotic Countdown contract. | |

== Combined reigns ==
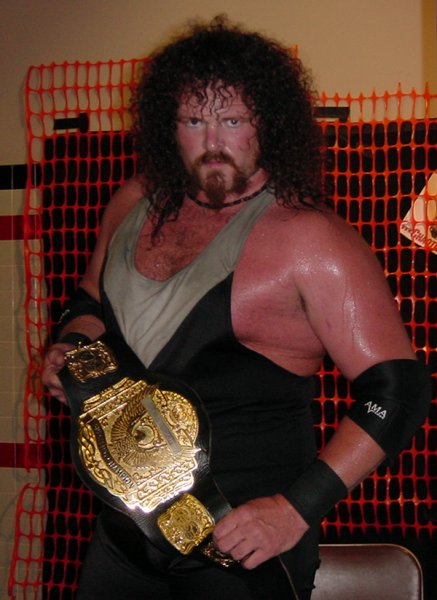
Former champion Rick Fuller, shown here with the original design of the title.

As of November 21, 2026.

| † | Indicates the current champion |

| Rank | Wrestler | No. of reigns | Combined days |
|---|---|---|---|
| 1 | Chase Del Monte | 3 | 1,069 |
| 2 | Brian Milonas | 3 | 896 |
| 3 | J. T. Dunn | 4 | 739 |
| 4 | Christian Casanova | 2 | 601 |
| 5 | Davienne | 2 | 385 |
| 6 | Handsome Johnny | 3 | 369 |
| 7 | Elia Markopoulos | 1 | 364 |
| 8 | Mark Shurman | 2 | 342 |
| 9 | Brian Fury | 2 | 330 |
| 10 | Mortar | 1 | 294 |
| 11 | John Walters | 2 | 288 |
| 12 | Luis Ortiz | 2 | 281 |
| 13 | Gino Martino | 2 | 280 |
| 14 | Maverick Wild | 1 | 266 |
| 15 | Thomas Penmanship | 1 | 259 |
| 16 | Alex Arion | 1 | 245 |
| 17 | Bryan Logan | 2 | 217 |
| 18 | Armani Kayos | 1 | 203 |
| 18 | The Mecca | 2 | 203 |
| 20 | Mikaze | 1 | 168 |
| 21 | Billy Kryptonite | 1 | 160 |
| 22 | Donovan Dijak | 1 | 148 |
| 23 | Ricky Smokes | 1 | 133 |
| 24 | Brad Cashew | 1 | 126 |
| 25 | Mike Verna | 1 | 113 |
| 26 | Tyree Taylor † | 1 | 106+ |
| 27 | Arch Kincaid | 1 | 105 |
| 27 | Danny Miles | 1 | 105 |
| 29 | Mike Kruel | 1 | 98 |
| 29 | Ronnie D. Lishus | 1 | 98 |
| 31 | Aron Stevens | 1 | 90 |
| 32 | Brian Black | 1 | 77 |
| 33 | Sean Burke | 2 | 61 |
| 34 | Anthony Greene | 1 | 42 |
| 35 | Rick Fuller | 1 | 42 |
| 36 | Julian Starr | 1 | 36 |
| 37 | Jay Jailette | 1 | 33 |

== See also ==
- Chaotic Wrestling New England Championship
- Chaotic Wrestling Tag Team Championship
- Chaotic Wrestling Pan Optic Championship
