= Tank Toland =

American professional wrestler (born 1973)

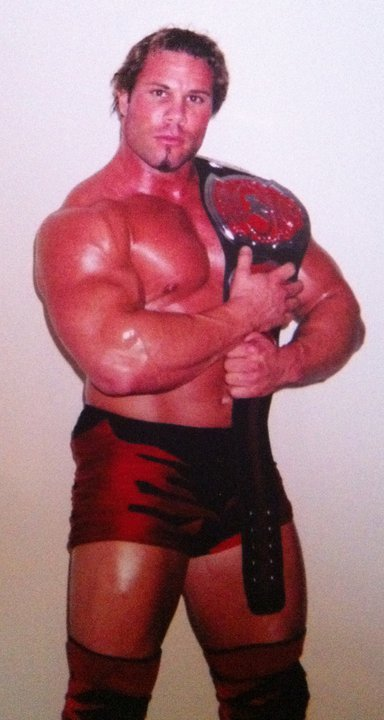
- Toland in 2003 holding an OVW Southern Tag Team Championship title belt

Personal information
- Born: John Michael Toland; August 31, 1973 (age 52) Atlantic City, New Jersey, U.S.

Professional wrestling career
- Ring name(s): James Dick; Tank Toland
- Billed height: 5 ft 8 in (1.73 m)
- Billed weight: 225 lb (102 kg)
- Billed from: Margate City, New Jersey
- Trained by: Ohio Valley Wrestling; Larry Sharpe and Bill Granatt
- Debut: 2000

John Joseph Toland (born August 31, 1980) is an American former professional wrestler, better known by his ring name, Tank Toland. Toland is best known for his appearances on the independent circuit with promotions such as Ring of Honor, Ohio Valley Wrestling as well as his appearances with World Wrestling Entertainment on its SmackDown! brand in 2005 to 2006 as James Dick.

== Professional wrestling career ==
=== Early career (2000–2003) ===
Toland was trained at Monster Factory and made his debut in 2000. He mainly worked for Phoenix Championship Wrestling in New Jersey.

=== World Wrestling Entertainment (2003–2006) ===
Toland wrestled in World Wrestling Entertainment's developmental territory Ohio Valley Wrestling starting in May 2003, teaming with Chris Cage. The babyface duo won the Tag title three times from 2003 to 2004. Her lost to Val Venis on Sunday Night Heat on October 13, 2003. During 2005 Toland turned heel and began to team with Chad Wicks, who posed as his cousin, Chad Toland they wrestled as the Blond Bombers and on April 12, 2005, the team won the OVW Southern Tag Team Title from the Thrillseekers (Matt Cappotelli and Johnny Jeter). Toland also went on to hold the OVW Heavyweight Title which he won from his former partner Chris Cage on December 1, 2004. He held it until he had to surrender it due to his first torn biceps that required surgery. While in OVW Toland was voted by the fans to be both the most popular babyface as well as most popular heel, which made him one of the major draws for the company.

Toland made his debut as a heel on SmackDown! as James Dick along with his partner, Chad Toland who was now using the name Chad Dick on October 14, 2005, as The Dicks. Their gimmick was dressing up like chippendales and using body oil (which was really water) to spray in their baby-face opponents eyes. After The Mexicools won their 8-man tag match with their partners Road Warrior Animal and Heidenreich by defeating Paul Burchill and William Regal and MNM, The Mexicools were ambushed by the Dicks, and in the process they threw the then current WWE Cruiserweight Champion, Juventud out of the ring and laid out Super Crazy and Psicosis using two of their signature tag team finishers.

On the October 28 episode of SmackDown!, The Dicks appeared once again, helping MNM capture the WWE Tag Team Championship when they attacked Heidenreich before Paul Burchill was about to receive the Doomsday Device finisher. This began a brawl with all the teams as the Dicks began attacking Road Warrior Animal. This allowed MNM to hit the Snapshot on Heidenreich and win the titles.

On the November 5 episode of Velocity, The Dicks made their in-ring debut in WWE defeating jobbers James Prentice and Kevin Antonio. On the November 25 episode of SmackDown!, The Dicks made their official SmackDown! debuts, defeating Heidenreich and Road Warrior Animal after blinding Road Warrior Animal with body oil.

On February 22, 2006, however, The Dicks were released from their WWE contracts. Their last match in WWE was on SmackDown! which was broadcast on February 24, 2006, where The Dicks were defeated by The Boogeyman. Both men returned to Ohio Valley Wrestling, where Toland and Wicks began an angle together.

In May 2006, while still wrestling for OVW, ROH and other promotions, Toland became the head instructor for OVW/WWE's developmental amateur class. He was responsible for training new students as well as WWE contracted wrestlers who were new to the wrestling business.

=== Independent Circuit (2006–2009) ===
After WWE and OVW, Toland worked in the independent circuit. In April 2007, he won the Xtreme 8 Tournament, defeating Brent Albright.

=== Ring of Honor (2006–2009) ===
In late 2006, Toland began wrestling for the Philadelphia based promotion Ring of Honor, being called "The All Natural Superior Athlete" Tank Toland. He made his debut at Suffocation on October 17, competing in a Four Corners Survival match against Roderick Strong, Chris Hero and Mark Briscoe. Toland wrestled several shows for ROH in 2006, his final being at The Chicago Spectacular: Night Two, before taking time off from the company due to a torn biceps that required surgery.

At the Fifth Year Festival: Dayton on February 23, 2007, Toland returned to ROH after being hired by Larry Sweeney as the new personal trainer to his client, Chris Hero. In his return match, he defeated Mitch Franklin, a student from the ROH Wrestling School. He was a member of Sweeney's Sweet 'n' Sour Inc. faction. On June 27, 2008, he made his return to the faction, teaming with Shane Hagadorn. He retired from wrestling in 2009.

=== Independent Circuit (2015–present) ===
In 2015, Toland came out of retirement and returned to wrestling. He currently works for promotions in New Jersey.

== Personal life ==
Toland grew up on the beaches of Margate City, New Jersey where he is a Lieutenant lifeguard on the Beach Patrol. He attended Atlantic City High School where he was a captain of both his football and baseball teams. He was also active in both school programs and community charity work. Toland continues to stay active within the community and the support of various charities.

Along with being a professional wrestler, Toland holds multiple degrees in Exercise Physiology, Kinesiology, Teaching Health and Physical Education and has a minor in Psychology from West Chester University. Toland was a successful teacher of health and physical education before making the transition to professional wrestling. He is now back to pursuing his teaching career, working full-time as a physical education teacher at Atlantic City High School while still wrestling.

== Championships and accomplishments ==
- Extreme Wrestling Federation
  - Xtreme 8 Tournament (2007)
- Ohio Valley Wrestling
  - OVW Southern Tag Team Championship (4 times) – with Chris Cage (3) and Chad Toland (1)
- Pro Wrestling Illustrated
  - PWI ranked him #141 of the 500 best singles wrestlers of the PWI 500 in 2006
