= Chaotic Wrestling New England Championship =

Professional wrestling championship

- Current design of the title

Details
- Promotion: Chaotic Wrestling
- Date established: February 23, 2001
- Current champion: Mr. Bacon
- Date won: August 21, 2026
Statistics
- First champion: Luis Ortiz
- Most reigns: Chase Del Monte/Chester Furnacola, Elia Markopoulos, Demon Ortiz/Luis Ortizand and Julian Starr (3 reigns)
- Longest reign: Mortar (507 days)
- Shortest reign: Tony Omega and Donovan Dijak (<1 day)

The Chaotic Wrestling (CW) New England Championship is a professional wrestling title in American independent promotion Chaotic Wrestling. The title was first won by "Latin Fury" Luis Ortiz in Revere, Massachusetts on February 23, 2001. There have been a total of 46 recognized individual champions, who have had a combined 68 official reigns.

== Title history ==
Key
No.	Overall reign number
Reign	Reign number for the specific champion
N/A	The information is not available or is unknown
+	Current reign is changing daily

No.	Champion	Championship change			Reign statistics		Notes	Ref.
No.	Champion	Date	Event	Location	Reign	Days	Notes	Ref.
1	Luis Ortiz	February 23, 2001	Chaotic Wrestling	Revere, MA	1	84		
2	Dukes Dalton	May 18, 2001	Chaotic Wrestling	Revere, MA	1	7		
3	Luis Ortiz	May 25, 2001	Chaotic Wrestling	Lawrence, MA	2	49		
4	Slyk Wagner Brown	July 13, 2001	Chaotic Wrestling	Lawrence, MA	1	56		
5	John Walters	September 7, 2001	Chaotic Wrestling	Lawrence, MA	1	162		
6	Dukes Dalton	February 16, 2002	Chaotic Wrestling	Lowell, MA	2	329		
7	Billy Kryptonite	January 11, 2003	Cold Fury 2: Last Call	North Andover, MA	1	55		
8	Vince Vicallo	March 7, 2003	Chaotic Wrestling	Methuen, MA	1	29		
9	Billy Kryptonite	April 5, 2003	Breaking Point	Methuen, MA	2	62		
10	Vince Vicallo	June 6, 2003	Chaotic Wrestling	Tewksbury, MA	2	120	This was a Bar Room Brawl match.	
11	Arch Kincaid	October 4, 2003	Chaotic Wrestling	Methuen, MA	1	209	Defeated previous champion Vince Vicallo, Billy Kryptonite and Luis Ortiz in a four-way match.	
12	Brian Black	April 30, 2004	Chaotic Wrestling	Methuen, MA	1	182		
13	Tony Omega	October 29, 2004	Chaotic Wrestling	Lowell, MA	1	<1		
14	Brian Milonas	October 29, 2004	Chaotic Wrestling	Lowell, MA	1	238		
15	Chase Del Monte	June 24, 2005	Chaotic Wrestling	Lowell, MA	1	43		
16	Thomas Penmanship	August 6, 2005	Chaotic Wrestling	Methuen, MA	1	181		
17	Psycho	February 3, 2006	Cold Fury 5: Five Years Of Fury	Lowell, MA	1	217		
18	Fred Sampson	September 8, 2006	Summer Chaos	Lowell, MA	1	168		
19	Brian Fury	February 23, 2007	Chaotic Wrestling	Derry, New Hampshire	1	239		
20	Alex Arion	October 20, 2007	Chaotic Wrestling	Derry, New Hampshire	1	257		
—	Vacated	July 3, 2008	—	—	—			
21	Scott Reed	August 15, 2008	Summer Chaos	Lowell, MA	1	175		
22	Demon Ortiz	February 6, 2009	Cold Fury 8: Infinite Possibilities	Lowell, MA	3	112		
23	Scott Reed	May 29, 2009	Breaking Point	Lowell, MA	2	112	This was a Ladder match.	
24	Elia Markopoulos	September 18, 2009	Chaotic Wrestling	Lowell, MA	1	56		
25	Danny E.	November 13, 2009	Night of Chaos	Lowell, MA	1	119	This was a Championship Scramble match which also involves Alex Arion, Demon Ortiz, Psycho and Scott Reed.	
26	Julian Starr	March 12, 2010	Cold Fury Fallout	Lowell, MA	1	98		
27	Brian Milonas	June 18, 2010	Breaking Point	Lowell, MA	2	106	This was a triple threat winner takes all match, where Milonas's Heavyweight title was also on the line.	
28	Mikaze	October 2, 2010	Chaotic Wrestling	Lawrence, MA	1	97		
29	Max Bauer	January 7, 2011	Chaotic Wrestling	Woburn, MA	1	14		
30	Mikaze	January 21, 2011	Chaotic Wrestling	Lowell, MA	2	21		
31	Max Bauer	February 11, 2011	Cold Fury 10	Lowell, MA	2	252		
32	Alex Arion	October 21, 2011	A Chaotic Halloween	Lowell, MA	2	136		
—	Vacated	March 5, 2012	—	—	—			
33	Matt Taven	March 16, 2012	Cold Fury Fallout Tour	Woburn, MA	1	156	Defeated Taka Suzuki in a tournament final to win the vacant title.	
34	Julian Starr	August 19, 2012	Cookout & Chaos II: Hardcore Volleyball	Hudson, MA	2	19		
35	Matt Taven	September 7, 2012	Chaotic Wrestling	Woburn, MA	2	22		
36	Julian Starr	September 29, 2012	Night Of Chaos	Littleton, NH	3	123	This was a Ladder match.	
—	Vacated	January 30, 2013	—	—	—			
37	Elia Markopoulos	March 1, 2013	Cold Fury 12: All Or Nothing	Lowell, MA	2	82		
—	Vacated	May 22, 2013	—	—	—			
38	Mikey Webb	June 7, 2013	Breaking Point	Woburn, MA	1	126	Defeated Alex Arion, Jimmy James, MPG, Slyck Wagner Brown and Vinny Marseglia in a six man gauntlet match for the vacant title.	
39	Chester Furnacola	October 11, 2013	A Chaotic Halloween	Woburn, MA	2	259	This was a House of Horrors match.	
40	Adam Booker	June 27, 2014	Breaking Point	Woburn, MA	1	21		
41	Chase Del Monte	July 18, 2014	Chaotic Wrestling	Lowell, MA	56	3	This was a Ladder match	
42	Elia Markopoulos	September 12, 2014	Chaotic Wrestling	Lowell, MA	3	140		
43	Cam Zagami	January 30, 2015	Chaotic Wrestling	Lowell, MA	1	50		
44	Sean Burke	March 21, 2015	Cold Fury 14: Divide & Conquer	Dracut, MA	1	69	This was a four-way match which involves Brandon Locke and Elia The Great.	
45	Brandon Locke	May 29, 2015	Chaotic Wrestling	Woburn, MA	1	420		
46	Scotty Slade	July 22, 2016	Chaotic Wrestling	Woburn, MA	1	49	This was a Brass Knuckles on a Pole match.	
47	Travis Gordon	September 9, 2016	A Night Of Grand Slams	Lowell, MA	1	147	This was a six man gauntlet match which involves Adam Booker, Kris Pyro, Sean Burke, Brandon Locke, and Scotty Slade	
48	Mike Verna	February 3, 2017	Chaotic Wrestling	Lawrence, MA	1	42		
49	Christian Casanova	March 17, 2017	Cold Fury 16: Unstoppable	Haverhill, MA	1	140	This was a Triple Threat match which also includes Travis "Flip" Gordon	
50	Donovan Dijak	August 4, 2017	Rhodes Of Gold	Danvers, MA	1	<1	This was a Triple Threat match which featured Josh Briggs and Christian Casanova. Upon winning this match in his final night with Chaotic Wrestling, Donovan Dijak immediately vacated the CW New England Championship	
—	Vacated	August 4, 2017	Rhodes Of Gold	Danvers, MA	—		Dijak vacated the championship upon winning the title in his final night with Chaotic Wrestling. A one night tournament was announced to determine a new CW New England Champion	
51	Josh Briggs	September 15, 2017	New England Title Tournament	Woburn, MA	1	322	Won a one night tournament to win the vacant CW New England Championship; the tournament featured J. T. Dunn, Mike Verna, Adam Booker, Christian Casanova, Chase Del Monte, and Brett Domino	
52	Anthony Greene	August 3, 2018	Chaotic Wrestling	Woburn, MA	1	126		
53	Mike Verna	December 7, 2018	Fury Vs. Dunn	Woburn, MA	2	189		
54	Brandon Locke	June 14, 2019	Chaotic Countdown	Lowell, MA	2	77	This was a No Disqualification match.	
55	DL Hurst	August 30, 2019	Summer Chaos	Haverhill, MA	1	305		
—	Vacated	June 30, 2020	—	—	—		Relinquished the championship upon retiring during the pandemic	
56	Bear Bronson	December 30, 2020	New Year's Eve: Reloaded	North Andover, MA	1	28	Defeated Ricky Archer in a Tournament Final for the vacant title.	
—	Vacated	—	January 28, 2021	—	—			
57	Adam Booker	January 28, 2021	Reloaded	North Andover, MA	2	154	Defeated CJ Cruz and Ricky Archer in a Three-way match to win the vacant title.	
58	Brad Cashew	July 1, 2021	Chaotic Wrestling	North Andover, MA	1	141		
59	Ricky Smokes	November 19, 2021	Breaking Point	Boxborough, MA	1	189		
60	Mortar	May 27, 2022	Chaotic Boston Brawl	Boston, MA	1		This was a ladder match.	
—	Vacated	2023	—	—	—		Exact date of the vacancy was not recorded (via cagematch.net), the 507 day figure is from the date of the original title win to the day Che Long won the vacated title, November 10, 2023.	
61	Che Long	November 10, 2023	Breaking Point 2023	Lowell, MA	1	126	This was a tournament final for the vacated championship - Landon Hale and Tyree Taylor were also in this match.	
62	Shannon LeVangie	March 15, 2024	Cold Fury XXII	Lowell, MA	1	85	This was a Tables, Doors, Ladders & Chairs match.	
—	Vacated	June 8, 2024	—	—	—			
63	Trigga the OG	August 29, 2024	Iron 4 Gold	Malden, MA	1	211	Iron Man Four Way Match for the vacant title - Aaron Rourke, Milo Mirra and TJ Crawford were also in the match.	
64	Arcturus	March 28, 2025	Cold Fury XXIII	Lowell, MA	1	84		
65	Trigga the OG	June 20, 2025	Charged Up 2025	Watertown, MA	2	84	Milo Mirra replaced Arcturus in this match.	
66	Arcturus	September 12, 2025	Summer Chaos 2025	Lowell, MA	2	98	This was a tables match.	
67	Milo Mirra	December 19, 2025	Holiday Hijack	Watertown, MA	1	245	This was a Street Fight match.	
68	Mr. Bacon	August 21, 2026	Locked & Loaded	Tewksbury, MA	1	70+	This was a Schoolyard Brawl match.	

== Combined reigns ==
As of October 30, 2026.

†	Indicates the current champion

Rank	Wrestler	No. of reigns	Combined days
1	Mortar	1	507
2	Brandon Locke	2	497
3	Alex Arion	2	393
4	Chase Del Monte/Chester Furnacola	3	358
5	Brian Milonas	2	344
6	Dukes Dalton	2	336
7	Josh Briggs	1	322
8	DL Hurst	1	305
9	Trigga the OG	2	295
10	Scott Reed	2	287
11	Elia Markopoulos	3	278
12	Max Bauer	2	266
13	Demon Ortiz/Luis Ortiz	3	245
13	Milo Mirra	1	245
15	Julian Starr	3	240
16	Brian Fury	1	239
17	Mike Verna	2	231
18	Psycho	1	217
19	Arch Kincaid	1	209
20	Ricky Smokes	1	189
21	Brian Black	1	182
21	Arcturus	2	182
22	Thomas Penmanship	1	181
23	Matt Taven	2	178
24	Adam Booker	2	175
25	Fred Sampson	1	168
26	John Walters	1	162
27	Vince Vicallo	2	149
28	Travis Gordon	1	147
29	Brad Cashew	1	141
30	Christian Casanova	1	140
31	Anthony Greene	1	126
31	Mike Webb	1	126
31	Che Long	1	126
32	Danny E.	1	119
33	Mikaze	2	118
34	Billy Kryptonite	2	117
35	Shannon LeVangie	1	105
36	Mr. Bacon †	1	70+
37	Sean Burke	1	69
38	Slyk Wagner Brown	1	56
39	Cam Zagami	1	50
40	Scotty Slade	1	49
41	Bear Bronson	1	29
42	Donovan Dijak	1	<1
42	Tony Omega	1	<1

== See also ==
- Chaotic Wrestling Heavyweight Championship
- Chaotic Wrestling Tag Team Championship
- Chaotic Wrestling Pan Optic Championship
