= Chad Wicks =

American professional wrestler

Personal information
- Born: Charles Wicks; March 6, 1978 (age 48) Mason City, Iowa, U.S.

Professional wrestling career
- Ring name(s): Billy Kryptonite; Chad Dick; Chad Toland; Charming Chad
- Billed height: 5 ft 8 in (173 cm)
- Billed weight: 235 lb (107 kg)
- Billed from: Margate, New Jersey
- Trained by: Chaotic Wrestling; Inoki Dojo; Ohio Valley Wrestling
- Debut: 2000
- Retired: 2006

Charles Wicks (born March 6, 1978) is an American retired professional wrestler best known for his time with World Wrestling Entertainment (WWE), where he wrestled as Chad Toland in its Ohio Valley Wrestling affiliate and later as Chad Dick on its SmackDown! brand.

== Professional wrestling career ==
In 2000, Wicks started his training at the Chaotic Training Center in North Andover, Massachusetts as "Lifesaver" Billy Kryptonite. He began his career in the Chaotic Wrestling promotion, but was called on by the Inoki Dojo after they had seen a shoot style match between Wicks and John Brooks. On January 16, 2004, John Walters defeated him in a "Loser Leaves Chaotic Wrestling" match. In early 2004 Wicks began to train at the Inoki Dojo in California. He also competed for the New Japan Pro-Wrestling Young Lions Cup and teamed with Jushin Thunder Liger.

In May 2004, Wicks signed a developmental deal and reported to Ohio Valley Wrestling (OVW) in June. On December 1, 2004, he began appearing on OVW programming under the name Chad Toland (sub for Tank Toland) and defeated Chris Cage to capture the OVW Heavyweight Championship. The next year he began to team with Tank Toland as The Blond Bombers and on April 12, 2005, the team won the OVW Southern Tag Team Title from the Thrillseekers.

He made his WWE debut as Chad Dick along with his partner Toland, now known as James Dick, on the October 14, 2005 of SmackDown! as the tag team The Dicks. After The Mexicools won their 8-man tag match with Road Warrior Animal and Heidenreich by defeating Paul Burchill and William Regal and MNM, the winners were ambushed by the Dicks, laying out Super Crazy and Psicosis with two of their signature tag team maneuvers. They made their in-ring debut November 5 on Velocity, defeating jobbers and expanding on their gimmick as Chippendale dancers. On the November 25 episode of SmackDown!, they made their official SmackDown! debuts, defeating Heidenreich and Road Warrior Animal. They ultimately became regulars on Velocity before a final appearance on the February 24, 2006 edition of SmackDown! where they were defeated by The Boogeyman in a handicap match. Shortly after the taping, they were released.

After WWE, Wicks worked in the independents and later retired that year.

== Personal life ==
On November 14, 2016, Wicks joined a class action lawsuit against WWE, litigated by Konstantine Kyros, who has been involved in a number of other lawsuits against them, alleging that "he is suffering from multiple symptoms of repetitive traumatic brain injuries and is undergoing neurological care." US District Judge Vanessa Lynne Bryant dismissed the lawsuit in September 2018.

On September 29, 2026, Wicks was arrested in Mason City, Iowa at 6:19 local time on a number of charges including driving with a suspended license. On November 4, 2026, Wicks was arrested again, by the Cerro Gordo County Sheriff's Office, for failure to appear in court. He was released the following day on bail. On November 12, 2026, Wicks was arrested for driving without a license and jailed at the Winnebago County Jail in Forest City, Iowa.

Wicks made his mixed martial arts debut on June 2, 2012, at Ring of Fire 43: Bad Blood, losing to former NFL player Demetrin Veal.

== Championships and accomplishments ==
- AWA Superstars of Wrestling
  - AWA Superstars of Wrestling World Tag Team Championship (1 time) - GQ Gallo
- Chaotic Wrestling
  - Chaotic Wrestling Heavyweight Championship (1 time)
  - Chaotic Wrestling New England Championship (2 times)
- Ohio Valley Wrestling
  - OVW Heavyweight Championship (1 time)
  - OVW Southern Tag Team Championship (1 time) - with Tank Toland
