= The Boogeyman (wrestler) =

American professional wrestler (born 1964)

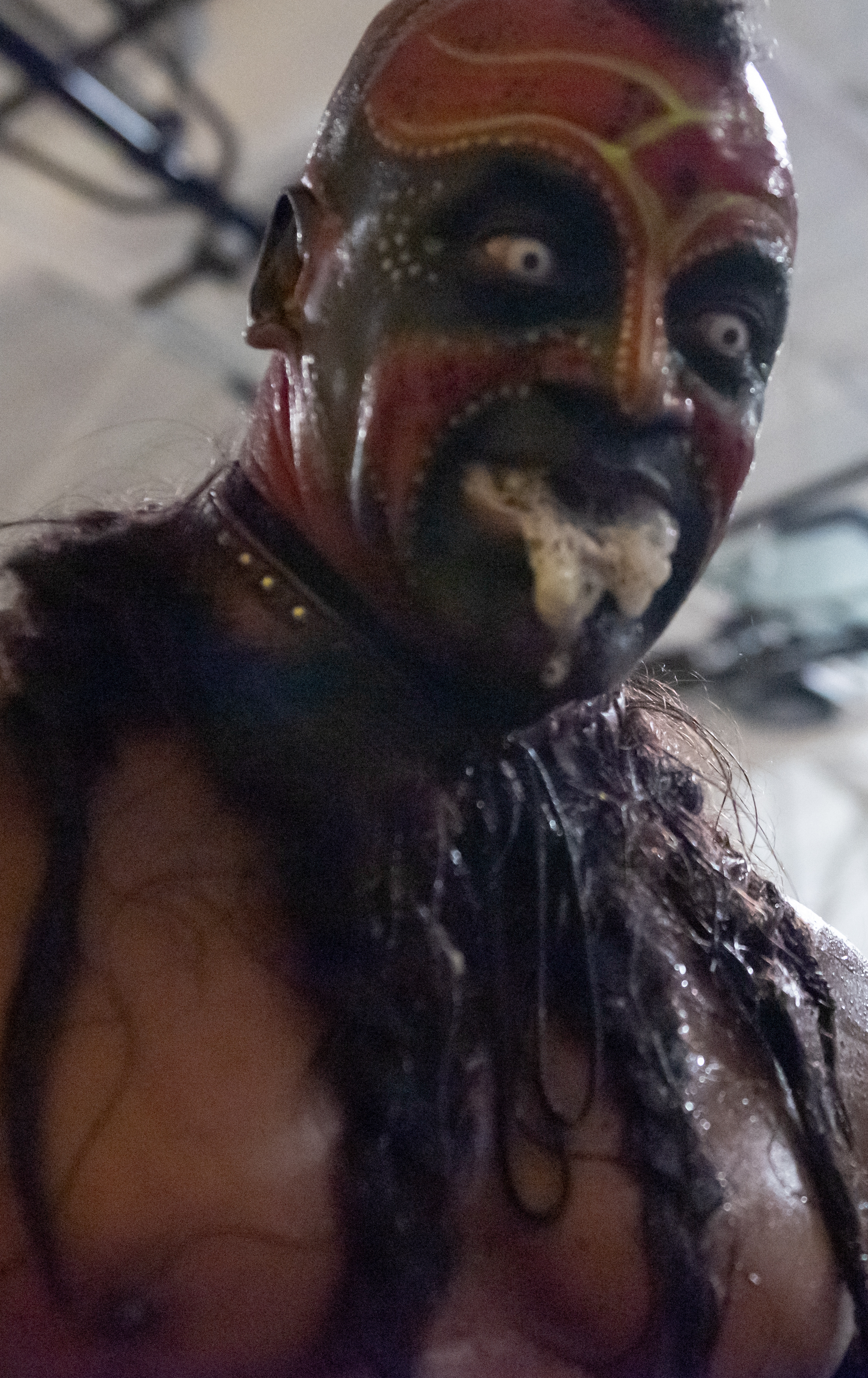
- The Boogeyman in 2019

Personal information
- Born: Martin Wright; July 15, 1964 (age 62) Miami-Dade County, Florida, U.S.

Professional wrestling career
- Ring name(s): The Boogeyman "Liar" Marty Wright; The Nightcrawler; Slither
- Billed height: 6 ft 2 in (1.88 m)
- Billed weight: 260 lb (118 kg)
- Billed from: The Bottomless Pit
- Trained by: Ohio Valley Wrestling; Stevie Ray; Booker T
- Debut: October 15, 2004

Martin Wright (born July 15, 1964), better known by the ring name The Boogeyman, is an American professional wrestler and fitness instructor. He is signed to WWE under a legends contract.

Wright debuted into professional wrestling in 2004 through Tough Enough but not long after being cut due to his age, he was sent to Ohio Valley Wrestling developmental territory in 2005 where he would later debut as The Boogeyman, a horror-themed wrestler donning red face paint who consumes worms through his opponents. After his WWE run ended in 2009, Wright would continue to wrestle in the independent circuit before returning to the company for a one-off appearance in the 2015 Royal Rumble, and has made sporadic appearances since.

== Professional wrestling career ==
=== World Wrestling Entertainment (2004–2009) ===
==== Tough Enough and Ohio Valley Wrestling (2004–2005) ====
Wright first entered the world of professional wrestling to take part in the fourth season of the World Wrestling Entertainment (WWE) produced reality television competition Tough Enough. On October 15, 2004, he attended the two-day event in Venice Beach, California, where he was among eight finalists chosen. After surviving the first day of eliminations he admitted that he was actually 40 years old—five years over the competition's cut off point—and not 30 as he had claimed. As a result, he was cut from the competition.

Though he had been cut from Tough Enough, WWE officials invited him to come to their developmental territory Ohio Valley Wrestling (OVW) for possible training. He trained between January and June 2005, making his OVW debut on June 25, 2005. During a dark match pitting the team of Seth Skyfire and Robert Fury against Robbie Dawber and his partner, Wright entered the ring and squashed all three men, no-selling the offense of Skyfire in the process. He then announced that he was "The Boogeyman" before leaving the building. The Boogeyman gimmick further evolved into a "monster" face who would appear when another wrestler said his name and attack him, while not selling any offense he received.

==== SmackDown! (2005–2007) ====
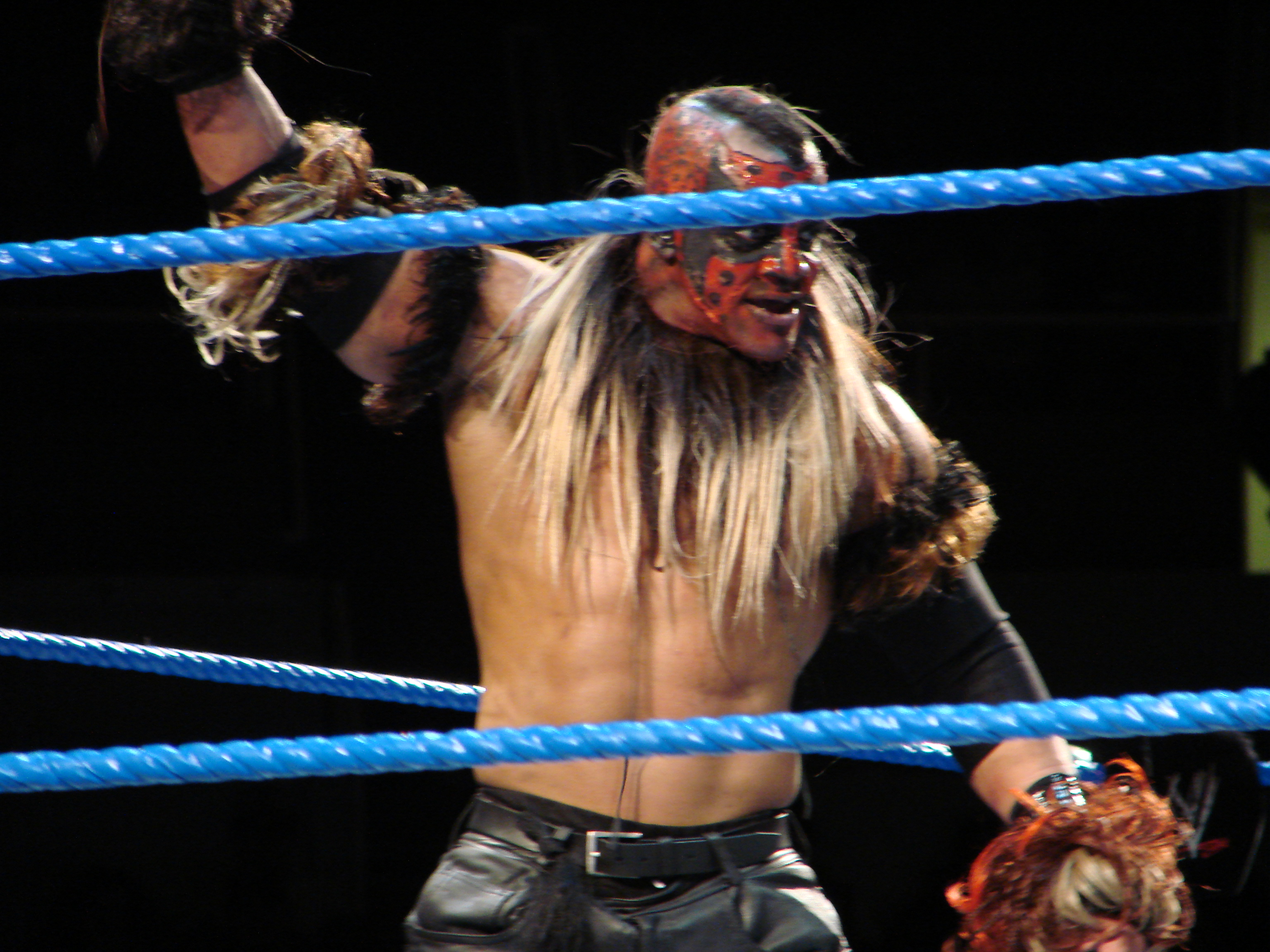
The Boogeyman in 2007

On the July 11, 2005 episode of Raw, horror movie-style vignettes began airing to promote the debut of his "The Boogeyman" gimmick, a horror-themed, disturbing, worm-devouring, Beetlejuice-like freak of nature. After a few weeks, the vignettes were moved from Raw to SmackDown!, but the planned debut was delayed when Wright hyperextended both knees and needed time to recover. He made his debut on the October 14, 2005 episode of SmackDown!, being brought in by network executive Palmer Canon as part of a "new talent initiative". The storyline referenced to vignettes months ago as promos for a television series on the network called "The Boogeyman". The show was cancelled before it could air, but they still had the actor under contract, so he was brought to SmackDown! to wrestle. The Boogeyman then proceeded to recite a modified version of the chant One, two, Freddy's coming for you from the movie A Nightmare on Elm Street before smashing an oversized alarm clock on his own head. For the next few weeks, The Boogeyman appeared in unexpected places backstage (closets, vans, et cetera), reciting different nursery rhymes and holding up clocks before screaming his catchphrase "I'm The Boogeyman and I'm comin' to get'cha!" and laughing maniacally.

At Survivor Series, The Boogeyman helped SmackDown! general manager Theodore Long defeat his Raw counterpart, Eric Bischoff. He made his official in-ring debut on the December 2 episode of SmackDown!, defeating Simon Dean in a squash. During this match, he took a handful of live worms from his pocket and stuffed them into his mouth. Over the next few weeks, The Boogeyman's opponents were generally "flattened" in the ring, left with worms in their mouths and/or spit on their faces. His official pay-per-view debut was at December's Armageddon when he came to the ring to confront Vito and Nunzio who were dressed as Santa Claus and an elf.

The Boogeyman's first major feud occurred with John Bradshaw Layfield (JBL) and his "fixer" Jillian Hall, and it began when he stalked the duo throughout a number of shows. During the January 6 episode of SmackDown!, he caught a fleeing Hall and shoved worms down the back of her skirt. On the January 13 taping of SmackDown!, during a Piper's Pit segment, The Boogeyman not only sniffed a "growth" on Jillian's face, but then licked it, bit it off and ate it. The Boogeyman faced JBL at the Royal Rumble, winning in under two minutes.

After defeating The Dicks in a handicap match on the February 24 episode of SmackDown!, The Boogeyman dumped a bucket of worms on the announce table, frightening special guest commentators Booker T and his wife Sharmell. The Boogeyman subsequently began to stalk Booker T and Sharmell over the next few weeks. He and Booker T were set to face off on the March 18 Saturday Night's Main Event XXXII, but the match was canceled due to Booker T faking a knee injury to escape competition. The feud eventually culminated at WrestleMania 22, with The Boogeyman defeating Booker T and Sharmell in a handicap match. During the match, The Boogeyman kissed Sharmell with a mouthful of worms. The match had to be cut short because of a biceps tear at a house show. To explain his absence to rehab his injury, Booker T and Sharmell obtained a restraining order against The Boogeyman on the April 7 episode of SmackDown!.

As SummerSlam approached, The Boogeyman began appearing in TV spots to promote the event. Vignettes also began airing advertising his return to SmackDown!. On September 20, WWE.com reported that Wright had been released from the company, however, on October 6, WWE.com announced that Wright had re-signed with the company and would be sent to be trained at Booker T and Stevie Ray's wrestling school in Houston, Texas. Wright returned on the October 27 episode of SmackDown!, attacking and spitting worms into the faces of The Miz and Kristal Marshall. During the feud he again terrorized and stalked his opponents, and eventually ended The Miz's undefeated streak at the Armageddon pay-per-view on December 17.

Wright then feuded with Finlay, who ended The Boogeyman's undefeated streak when Hornswoggle interfered. On the February 2 edition of SmackDown! during a match against Chris Benoit for the WWE United States Championship, The Boogeyman abducted Hornswoggle, distracting Finlay and giving Benoit a chance to win the match with a roll-up. On the February 16 edition of SmackDown! The Boogeyman appeared with a little person of his own, Little Boogeyman, who was portrayed by an actor named Chris Hollyfield. His purpose was to counteract Hornswoggle, who was proving a problem in one-on-one matches with Finlay. The Boogeyman and Little Boogeyman lost to Finlay and Hornswoggle in a mixed tag team match at No Way Out. The team lost a rematch the following week on SmackDown!; Little Boogeyman was pinned by Finlay, after Wright had chased away Hornswoggle.

On OVW's 400th anniversary show, The Boogeyman made an appearance, losing to Ryan Wilson in a tables match. The Boogeyman returned to in ring action when teamed with Kane during his feud with William Regal and Dave Taylor. This also marked the return of Little Boogeyman. The feud would be short lived as The Boogeyman and Little Boogeyman would then start another feud with Finlay and Hornswoggle. The Boogeyman and Little Boogeyman were defeated in a mixed tag team match by Finlay and Hornswoggle at Saturday Night's Main Event XXXIV on June 2.

The Boogeyman ended his tenure on SmackDown! with a loss to Mark Henry in a squash match, as part of Henry's new "Path of Destruction" gimmick. After that match, Mark Henry then beat up Little Boogeyman who was at ringside, and Henry gave him a body splash, (kayfabe) severely injuring him.

==== ECW and departure (2007–2009) ====
On the June 11 edition of Raw, The Boogeyman was drafted to the ECW brand in the annual WWE draft. The next day he debuted for the brand and defeated Matt Striker, beginning a feud with him. On July 10 in New Orleans, The Boogeyman was a guest during a Striker's Classroom segment, ostensibly to be educated on worms, only to be attacked by Striker's debuting enforcer, Big Daddy V. The Boogeyman was not seen for the next three weeks, finally re-emerging on the July 31 episode—with a new face paint design and black contact lenses—to scare Big Daddy V off after he finished a match. The Boogeyman was taken out by Big Daddy V from behind after a distraction from Striker a week later.

On the August 14 episode of ECW, The Boogeyman scored a disqualification victory over ECW Champion John Morrison after Morrison shoved the referee. The Boogeyman went on to successfully team with CM Punk at Saturday Night's Main Event XXXV on August 18 against Morrison and Big Daddy V. On the August 28 episode of ECW, The Boogeyman was one of the participants in the Fatal Four Way match for a shot at Morrison's title; however, CM Punk was the victor. On September 4, on ECW, The Boogeyman defeated Matt Striker by disqualification when Big Daddy V interfered, and went on to hit The Boogeyman with a ghetto drop on the outside of the ring. On the September 18 episode of ECW, The Boogeyman and Big Daddy V finally faced off in their first one-on-one match, which The Boogeyman lost.

The Boogeyman's return to wrestling action was initially delayed due to a torn calf muscle, but it had also been reported that he was having dental surgery done to replace missing teeth. On the October 7 episode of ECW a vignette was aired promoting The Boogeyman's return. Additional vignettes aired for a few weeks after that. On the October 13, 2008 edition of Raw, The Boogeyman made his return, appearing during a segment with Jackass's Johnny Knoxville, Chris Pontius, and Big Dick Johnson ending with The Boogeyman bringing live worms out of a bag and after putting them in his own mouth spat them into the mouth of Pontius.

The Boogeyman made his ECW return on the November 25 episode, in a segment with John Morrison and the Miz. He made his return to in ring competition on December 9 against Scott Reed, a local talent, who he defeated with ease. On the December 30 episode of ECW, he lost to John Morrison and The Miz in a No DQ match with Finlay as his partner. On the January 20, 2009 edition of ECW, he defeated Paul Burchill by disqualification, his first victory over a non-enhancement talent since returning to the brand. His last appearance on WWE programming was on the March 3 episode of ECW where he lost in a match against Kane. The next day on March 4, 2009, WWE announced that they had released Wright from his WWE contract.

=== Independent circuit (2010–present) ===
After WWE, Wright returned to the Pro Wrestling Alliance using his Boogeyman gimmick. He wrestled at the Cyberstarz event of Millennium Wrestling Federation in February 2012, where he defeated Lukas Sharp.

In September 2023, Wright faced Robbie Superstar in a singles match at a World Classic Professional Big Time Wrestling event. In March 2024, he competed in a 30-man Last Stand Rumble for Booker T's Reality of Wrestling promotion.

=== Return to WWE (2012–present) ===
On the December 16, 2012 episode of Raw, Wright returned as The Boogeyman during the Slammy Awards, sneaking up on former rival Booker T.

Boogeyman appeared in Halloween themed videos on the WWE YouTube channel in both November 2013 and October 2014. On the December 22, 2014 episode of Raw, Boogeyman appeared in a segment on the WWE App.

On January 25, 2015, at the Royal Rumble, Boogeyman entered the Royal Rumble match as a surprise entrant at number 7, marking his first WWE in–ring performance in almost six years, but he was quickly eliminated by Bray Wyatt. On November 6, it was announced that Wright has signed a legends contract (a long-term deal to make infrequent, non-wrestling appearances) with WWE. On January 22, 2018, Boogeyman made an appearance on Raw 25 Years. On July 22, 2019, Boogeyman appeared at the Raw Reunion show, and scared Drake Maverick in the locker room, helping Pat Patterson pin Maverick and win the WWE 24/7 Championship.

On January 4, 2021, Boogeyman once again appeared on the Raw Legends Night special and scared 24/7 Champion Angel Garza, allowing R-Truth to pin him and win the title.

== Personal life ==
As of 2018, Wright was working as a fitness instructor in Denver, Colorado. Wright has his own training facility in Boulder, Colorado, from which he regularly posts videos of himself helping others lose weight and get in shape.

== Other media ==
=== Video games ===
Logan Paul in video games
| Year | Title | Notes | Ref. |
|---|---|---|---|
| 2006 | WWE SmackDown vs. Raw 2007 | Video game debut | |
| 2008 | WWE SmackDown vs. Raw 2009 | Unlockable using Cheat Codes | |
| 2009 | WWE Legends of WrestleMania | Importable from Smackdown vs. Raw 2009 | —N/a |
| 2020 | WWE 2K Battlegrounds | DLC – "Free Post-Launch DLC" | |
| 2022 | WWE 2K22 | DLC – "The Most Wanted Pack" | |
| 2023 | WWE 2K23 | | |
| 2024 | WWE 2K24 | | |
| 2025 | WWE 2K25 | | |
| 2026 | WWE 2K26 | | |

In January 2013, Wright appeared on two short promos featuring Bobby Lashley to promote Lashley's family fitness center in Aurora, Colorado, named American Top Team Altitude.

In 2015, Wright appeared in two episodes of the WWE Network series, Swerved, a hidden camera prank show by Jackass co-creator Jeff Tremaine. In 2018, he appeared on the House Hardy Halloween special that aired on WWE Network.

== Championships and accomplishments ==
- Alabama Wrestling Federation
  - AWF Tag Team Championship (1 time) – with Bobby Lashley
- Pro Wrestling Illustrated
  - Rookie of the Year (2006)
  - Ranked No. 114 of the top 500 singles wrestlers in the PWI 500 in 2007
