= Chaotic Wrestling =

American independent wrestling promotion

- Founded: 2000
- Style: Professional wrestling
- Headquarters: North Andover, MA
- Owner: Kevin Bowe (2020–present) Brian Phillips (2017–2020) Jamie Jamitkowski (2000–2017)
- Website: www.chaoticwrestling.com

Chaotic Wrestling, stylized as CHAOTIC, is an American independent wrestling promotion, which has been operating throughout New England since 2000; with its current home base in North Andover, Massachusetts.

Chaotic Wrestling is known for producing successful, homegrown talent through their professional wrestling school, the New England Pro Wrestling Academy (formerly known as the Chaotic Training Center). Graduates of the school include Mercedes Moné, Kofi Kingston, Tommaso Ciampa, Oney Lorcan, Ivar (War Raiders) (later becoming head trainer), among others.

== History ==
Originally Chaotic World Wrestling, the Chaotic Wrestling roster is composed mainly of independent wrestlers and established veterans from major wrestling promotions. Chaotic Wrestling has run events every two or three weeks since opening in 2000. Founded by Tom Davidson (aka The Missionary Man) and Joshua Opper (aka Kid Anarchy) two native Massachusetts residents who worked small independent outfits on the west coast most notably, Incredibly Strange Wrestling. In the promotion's first year of operation, Chaotic Wrestling was featured at New England's Locobazooka music festival. The wrestlers competed alongside musical acts such as Days of the New and Disturbed at the event, which was attended by an estimated 15,000 people.

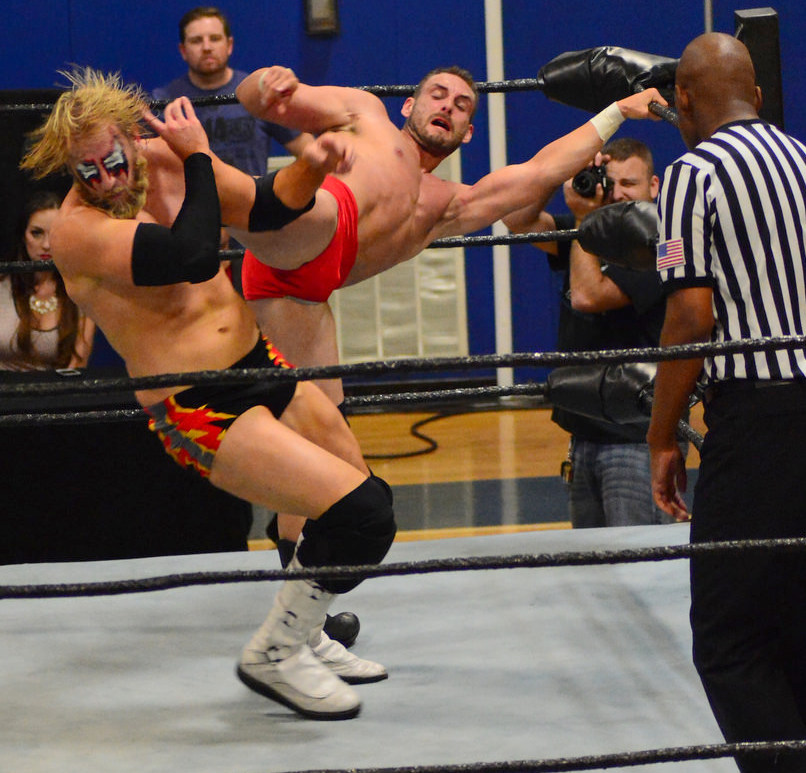
Brandon Locke's superkick on Sean Burke at CW's Breaking Point in Stoneham, MA

Chaotic Wrestling has been described as a “feeder fed[eration]” for World Wrestling Entertainment (WWE). Because of this relationship, WWE has been known to contact CW when they are in need of people to appear on WWE programming. Chaotic Wrestling was selected in 2006 to host a large WWE tryout session, and several Chaotic Wrestling competitors, including Kofi Kingston, were later employed by WWE. Former Chaotic Wrestling referee and booker Todd "The Bod" Sinclair has also worked for WWE and currently works for Ring of Honor.

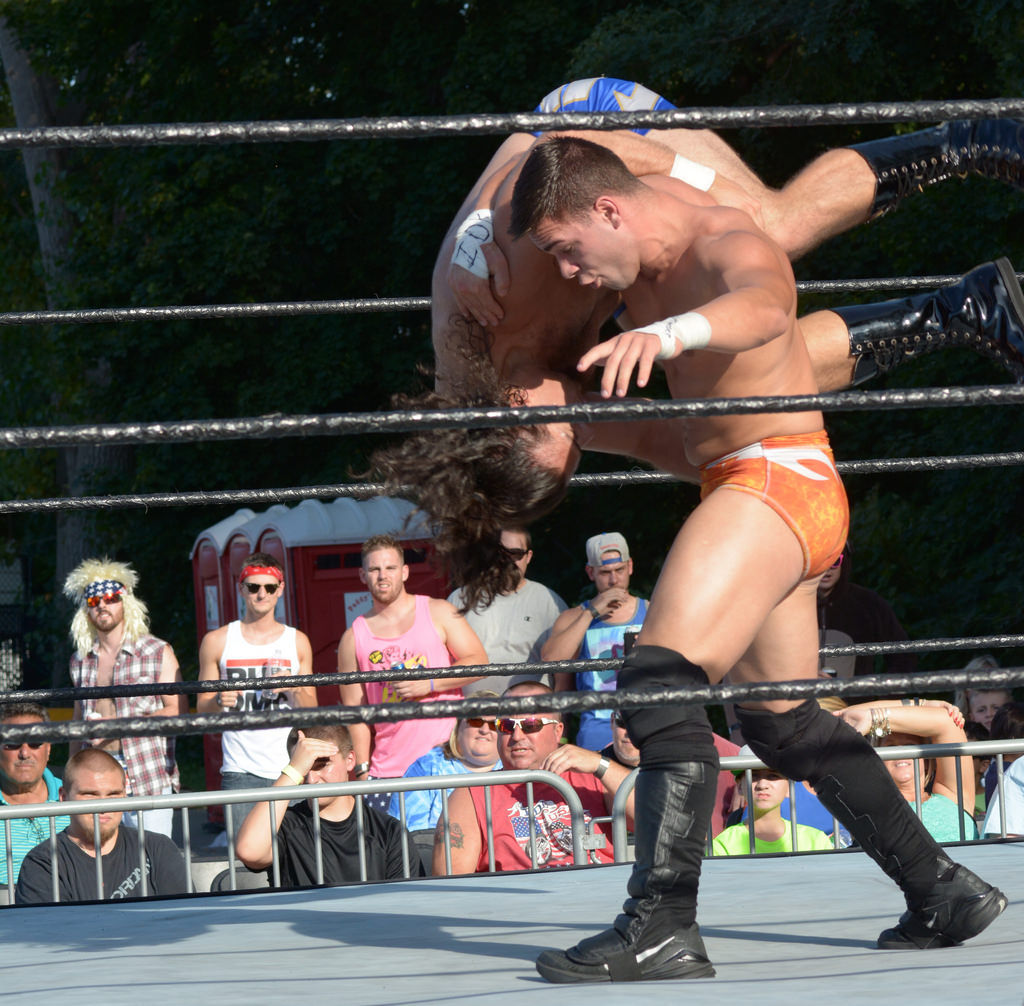
Newcomers, Flip Gordon and Brick Mastone wrestle at an outdoor event in 2015 to benefit wounded vets.

Chaotic Wrestling has also employed several wrestlers who had previously gained fame with major promotions. World Wrestling Entertainment Hall of Famer Tony Atlas has competed for the promotion. After his previous employer, Extreme Championship Wrestling, went out of business, Spike Dudley joined Chaotic Wrestling and held the tag team championship before signing with WWE. Other notable wrestlers that have appeared for Chaotic Wrestling include Brutus Beefcake, King Kong Bundy, and WWE Hall of Famers Bret Hart, Tito Santana, Jimmy Snuka, and Ricky Steamboat. Chaotic Wrestling has also participated in a talent exchange program with the East Coast Wrestling Association, an independent promotion that has been operating since 1967. This program allowed wrestlers from each promotion to compete in both CW and ECWA.

Some wrestlers competing for Chaotic Wrestling have been noted for their unusual gimmicks. Writing for The Boston Phoenix, columnist Sean Bartlett commented on the "baroque characters" and wrestlers wearing "vinyl boots and fluorescent hot pants". Boston Magazine's Benoit Denizet-Lewis pointed to the "ambiguously gay" two-time Chaotic Wrestling Tag Team Champions One Night Stand (Ronnie D. Lishus & Edward G. Xtasy) as well as Arch Kincaid, a man resembling a "1980s porn star" who "lectures about existentialism and philosophical theory" at Chaotic Wrestling events, as an example of the promotion's appeal. In a story about the promotion for The Boston Globe, Danielle Dreilinger described how a referee searched a wrestler named Psycho for foreign objects prior to a match. The referee was forced to confiscate many weapons, including a hula hoop and a slice of pizza.

Chaotic Wrestling owner Jamie Jamitkowski states that the promotion has no desire to compete with Vince McMahon's World Wrestling Entertainment, preferring the "tight-knit community of wrestlers and fans". He views Chaotic Wrestling as an affordable alternative to major promotions and says that fans are able to feel more involved at independent wrestling shows. He also states that the promotion has benefited in some ways from the late-2000s recession, as more fans are attending independent shows run by independent promotions like CW rather than paying for more expensive tickets to attend WWE events. This increase in ticket sales has allowed Chaotic Wrestling to operate more shows and expand their market into new cities.

In May 2007, Chaotic Wrestling and Fabulous Productions announced a special charity event featuring then-World Wrestling Entertainment Champion John Cena acting as special guest referee between two of CW's wrestlers, Brian Milonas and "Big" Rick Fuller. Cena's father, who works for Chaotic Wrestling as an announcer, was in Fuller's corner. During the match, WWE CEO Vince McMahon made a surprise appearance, attacking Cena, only to receive an FU from him. The event also featured WWE wrestler Eugene competing against Handsome Johnny. Funds from the event went to the Newbury Police Association and several other charities.

Chaotic Wrestling later hosted another fundraiser event to help with the medical bills for WWE Hall of Famer and former Chaotic Training Center operator Killer Kowalski.

== Pro Wrestling Academy (NEPWA) ==
Chaotic Wrestling also operates a successful professional wrestling school known as the New England Pro Wrestling Academy (NEPWA), which operated as the Chaotic Training Center until July 1, 2011. The school was established in the early 2000s, when it merged with the Killer Kowalski School of Wrestling. Kowalski, who was described as one of the “most respected trainers” in the world and trained such wrestlers as Big John Studd, Triple H, Perry Saturn, and Chyna, oversaw training at the school prior to his death.

The school is owned by Chaotic Wrestling owner, Kevin Bowe (Chase Del Monte), as well as Scott Guerin (Max Smashmaster) former Chikara star. The school has also hosted many guests from the wrestling industry including John Cena, Triple H and Stephanie McMahon, The Rock and Goldberg, Tom Prichard, Tommy Dreamer, Percy Pringle, Nunzio, Charlie Haas and many others.

While forced to shut down for several months during the COVID-19 pandemic, the school underwent numerous renovations to improve the facilities provided to their students. Post-renovations, the school now is equipped with a full gym/workout area, as well as a "collapsible" studio, so that they can also utilize the facility to record full wrestling shows during the pandemic.

=== Notable graduates ===
Numerous graduates have appeared on WWE/AEW television, performed tryout matches, and/or signed developmental contracts, including:

- Kofi Kingston
- Damien Sandow
- Dominik Dijakovic
- Flip Gordon
- R. J. Brewer
- Chad Wicks
- Ivar
- Mercedes Moné
- Darren Young
- Roxxi
- Kenny Dykstra
- Oney Lorcan
- Tommaso Ciampa
- Carmelo Hayes

== Championships ==
=== Current champions ===
Championship	Current champion(s)	Reign	Date won	Days held	Location	Notes	Ref.
Heavyweight Championship	Tyree Taylor	1	August 7, 2026	7+	Malden, MA	Defeated Armani Kayos at Under Siege by cashing in his Countdown Contract.	
New England Championship	Milo Mirra	1	December 19, 2025	237+	Watertown, MA	Defeated Arcturus at Holiday Hijack in a street fight.	
Tag Team Championship	The Breadwinners (Patrick Wheatman and Cash McGuiness)	1	September 11, 2026	31+	Lowell, MA	Defeated Vegan Society (Seabass Finn and Sean Keegan) at Summer Chaos.	
Pan Optic Championship	Dante Drago	1	October 9, 2026	3+	Malden, MA	Defeated then-champion Shannon LeVangie, Milo Mirra, Omar La Casa, Paris Van Dale, and Trigga the OG in a six-way match at The Devil In Me.	

=== Retired and defunct championships ===
Championship	Final champion(s)	Date retired
Chaotic Wrestling Television Championship	Dukes Dalton	February 16, 2002
Chaotic Wrestling Light Heavyweight Championship	Dukes Dalton	February 16, 2002

== Chaotic Wrestling Hall of Fame ==
The Chaotic Wrestling Hall of Fame is an American professional wrestling hall of fame maintained by the Lowell-based promotion Chaotic Wrestling (CW). It was established in 2006 to honor wrestlers who have wrestled for the promotion.

Inductees

#	Year	Ring name (Birth name) (Note: Entries without a birth name indicates that the inductee did not perform under a ring name.)	Notes (Note: This section mainly lists the major accomplishments of each inductee in Chaotic Wrestling.)
1	2006	Luis Ortiz	Won the Chaotic Wrestling Heavyweight Championship (2 times), Chaotic Wrestling New England Championship (3 times), and Chaotic Wrestling Tag Team Championship (1 time)
2	2008	Arch Kincaid (Nick Dealy)	Won the Chaotic Wrestling Heavyweight Championship (1 time), Chaotic Wrestling New England Championship (1 time), Chaotic Wrestling Light Heavyweight Championship (1 time), and Chaotic Wrestling Tag Team Championship (2 times)
3	2008	Dukes Dalton (James McCarthy)	Won the Chaotic Wrestling New England Championship (2 times) and Chaotic Wrestling Light Heavyweight Championship (1 time)
4	2009	Mike Hollow	Head instructor at Chaotic Wrestling's training facility
5	2009	John Walters (John Stagikas)	Won the Chaotic Wrestling Heavyweight Championship (2 times), Chaotic Wrestling New England Championship (1 time), and Chaotic Wrestling Tag Team Championship (1 time)
6	2010	Gino Martino (John Ferraro)	Won the Chaotic Wrestling Heavyweight Championship (2 times)
7	2011	Killer Kowalski (Walter Kowalski)	Trained many of Chaotic Wrestling's top stars through his "School of Professional Wrestling".
8	2015	Psycho (Jarod Ceres)	Won the Chaotic Wrestling New England Championship (1 time) and Chaotic Wrestling Tag Team Championship (2 times)

== See also ==
- List of independent wrestling promotions in the United States
