= List of NWA World Tag Team Champions =

List of professional wrestling tag team champions

The NWA World Tag Team Championship is a professional wrestling world tag team championship promoted by the National Wrestling Alliance (NWA). The NWA did not officially recognize any tag team champions until 1992; prior to 1992, the various NWA affiliates recognized and promoted their own versions of the world tag team championship.

== Reigns ==
Key
| No. | Overall reign number |
| Reign | Reign number for the specific team—reign numbers for the individuals are in parentheses, if different |
| Days | Number of days held |
| N/A | Unknown information |
| † | Championship change is unrecognized by the promotion |
| <1 | Reign lasted less than a day |

| No. | Champion | Championship change | | | Reign statistics | | Notes | Ref. |
| No. | Champion | Date | Event | Location | Reign | Days | Notes | Ref. |
|---|---|---|---|---|---|---|---|---|
World Championship Wrestling (WCW)
| 1 | Miracle Violence Connection (Steve Williams and Terry Gordy) | July 12, 1992 | The Great American Bash | Albany, GA | 1 | 71 | The Miracle Violence Connection defeated Barry Windham and Dustin Rhodes in a tournament final. Gordy and Williams were also the reigning WCW World Tag Team Champions, having defeated the Steiner Brothers on July 5; from then until the withdrawal of WCW from the NWA, the WCW and NWA World Tag Team Championships are defended together. | |
| 2 | Barry Windham and Dustin Rhodes | September 21, 1992 | Saturday Night | Atlanta, GA | 1 | 58 | The match aired on tape delay on October 3, 1992. | |
| 3 | Ricky Steamboat and Shane Douglas | November 18, 1992 | Clash of the Champions XXI | Macon, GA | 1 | 104 | | |
| 4 | The Hollywood Blondes (Brian Pillman and Steve Austin) | March 2, 1993 | WorldWide | Macon, GA | 1 | 169 | The match aired on tape delay on March 27, 1993. | |
| 5 | Arn Anderson and Paul Roma | August 18, 1993 | Clash of the Champions XXIV | Daytona Beach, FL | 1 | 14 | Defeated Steve Austin and Lord Steven Regal, who was subbing for Brian Pillman. | |
| — | Vacated | September 1, 1993 | — | — | — | — | The championship was vacated after WCW withdrew from the NWA. | |
National Wrestling Alliance (NWA)
| 6 | Rock 'n' Roll Express (Ricky Morton and Robert Gibson) | April 11, 1995 | Live event | Dallas, TX | 1 | 76 | The Rock 'n' Roll Express defeated Dick Murdoch and Randy Rhodes in an eight-team tournament final. | |
| — | Vacated | June 26, 1995 | USWA live event | Memphis, TN | — | — | The championship held up after match with PG-13 (J. C. Ice and Wolfie D). | |
| 7 | Rock 'n' Roll Express (Ricky Morton and Robert Gibson) | July 3, 1995 | USWA live event | Memphis, TN | 2 | 32 | The Rock 'n' Roll Express defeated PG-13 (J. C. Ice and Wolfie D) in rematch. | |
| — | Vacated | August 4, 1995 | — | — | — | — | The championship vacated due to The Rock 'n' Roll Express splitting up, due to Ricky Morton's suspension from NWA affiliate Smoky Mountain Wrestling. | |
| 8 | Mr. Gannosuke and Tarzan Goto | December 9, 1995 | IWA Japan live event | Saitama, Japan | 1 | 255 | Gannosuke and Goto defeated Cactus Jack and Tiger Jeet Singh in a tournament final. Also hold IWA World Tag Team Championship and defend the titles simultaneously until June 10, 1996. | |
| — | Vacated | June 10, 1996 | — | — | — | — | The championship vacated when Mr. Gannosuke and Tarzan Goto leave NWA affiliate IWA Japan. | |
| 9 | Andersons (C. W. Anderson and Pat Anderson) | September 14, 1996 | Live event | Goldston, NC | 1 | 389 | The Andersons defeated The Fantastics (Bobby Fulton and Tommy Rogers) to win the vacant championship. | |
| — | Vacated | October 8, 1997 | — | — | — | — | The championship vacated due to agreement with the World Wrestling Federation (WWF) to have the belts defended in that promotion; C. W. Anderson and Pat Anderson were not a part of the WWF at the time. | |
World Wrestling Federation (WWF)
| 10 | Rock 'n' Roll Express (Ricky Morton and Robert Gibson) | January 12, 1998 | Raw Is War | State College, PA | 3 | 36 | The championship was awarded to The Rock 'n' Roll Express. | |
| 11 | The Headbangers (Mosh and Thrasher) | February 17, 1998 | Raw Is War | Waco, TX | 1 | 41 | Aired on tape delay on February 23, 1998. The match was contested under WWF rules. | |
| 12 | The Midnight Express (Bodacious Bart and Bombastic Bob) | March 30, 1998 | Raw Is War | Albany, NY | 1 | 137 | | |
National Wrestling Alliance (NWA)
| 13 | The Border Patrol (Agent Gunn and Agent Maxx) | August 14, 1998 | Live event | Greenville, NC | 1 | 29 | | |
| 14 | Barry Windham and Tully Blanchard | September 12, 1998 | Live event | Lincolnton, NC | 1 (2, 1) | 28 | | |
| 15 | The Border Patrol (Agent Gunn and Agent Maxx) | October 10, 1998 | Live event | Cameron, NC | 2 | 14 | | |
| 16 | The Brotherhood (Eric Sbraccia and Knuckles Nelson) | October 24, 1998 | 50th Anniversary Show | Cherry Hill, NJ | 1 | 130 | This was a four corners match, also involving The Border Patrol (Agent Gunn and Agent Maxx), Team Extreme (Khris Germany and Kit Carson) and Tom Prichard and Tully Blanchard. | |
| — | Vacated | March 3, 1999 | — | — | — | — | The championship held up after The Brotherhood (Eric Sbraccia and Knuckles Nelson) failed to defend the titles on February 26, 1999. | |
| 17 | The Brotherhood (Knuckles Nelson and Rick Fuller) | June 10, 1999 | Live event | Dallas, TX | 1 (2, 1) | 7 | The Brotherhood defeated Team Extreme (Khris Germany and Kit Carson) to win the vacant championship. | |
| 18 | The Public Enemy (Johnny Grunge and Rocco Rock) | June 17, 1999 | Live event | Bolton, MA | 1 | 2 | | |
| 19 | The Brotherhood (Dukes Dalton and Knuckles Nelson) | June 19, 1999 | Live event | Dorchester, MA | 1 (1, 3) | 98 | | |
| 20 | Team Extreme (Khris Germany and Kit Carson) | September 25, 1999 | 51st Anniversary Show | Charlotte, NC | 1 | 62 | | |
| 21 | Murder Incorporated (Jimmy James and Kevin Northcutt) | November 26, 1999 | Live event | North Richland Hills, TX | 1 | 21 | | |
| 22 | Team Extreme (Khris Germany and Kit Carson) | December 17, 1999 | Live event | North Richland Hills, TX | 2 | 78 | | |
| 23 | xXx (Curtis Thompson and Drake Dawson) | March 4, 2000 | Live event | Cornelia, GA | 1 | 34 | | |
| 24 | The Main Event (Reno Riggins and Steven Dunn) | April 7, 2000 | Live event | Eskan, Saudi Arabia | 1 | 5 | | |
| 25 | Rock 'n' Roll Express (Ricky Morton and Robert Gibson) | April 12, 2000 | Live event | Waegwan, South Korea | 4 | 5 | The Rock 'n' Roll Express defeated Steven Dunn and Jackie Fulton, who was subbing for Reno Riggins. | |
| 26 | Big Bubba Pain and L.A. Stephens | April 17, 2000 | Live event | Osan, South Korea | 1 | 2 | | |
| 27 | xXx (Curtis Thompson and Drake Dawson) | April 19, 2000 | Live event | Okinawa, Japan | 2 | 118 | | |
| 28 | Bad Attitude (David Young and Rick Michaels) | August 15, 2000 | Live event | Tampa, FL | 1 | 172 | Bad Attitude defeated Curtis Thompson and Jeff Justice, who was subbing for Drake Dawson. | |
| † | Air Paris and Rob Williams | December 9, 2000 | Live event | Nashville, TN | – | 13 | Defeated Bad Attitude at an NWA Nashville event. NWA Nashville announced a title change; however, the NWA's main office considered this a non-title match. | |
| † | Bad Attitude (David Young and Rick Michaels) | December 22, 2000 | NWA Nashville Christmas Chaos | Nashville, TN | – | 43 | This was a ladder match. NWA considers Bad Attitude's first reign to be unbroken. | |
| 29 | Bad Street Boys (Christian York and Joey Matthews) | February 3, 2001 | Live event | Nashville, TN | 1 | 14 | | |
| 30 | Bad Attitude (David Young and Rick Michaels) | February 17, 2001 | Live event | Cornelia, GA | 2 | 33 | | |
| 31 | Dan Factor and David Flair | March 22, 2001 | Live event | Athens, GA | 1 | 1 | | |
| 32 | Bad Attitude (David Young and Rick Michaels) | March 23, 2001 | Live event | Toccoa, GA | 3 | 32 | | |
| 33 | Heavenly Bodies (Chris Nelson and Vito DeNucci) | April 24, 2001 | Live event | Tampa, FL | 1 | 248 | | |
| 34 | Glacier and Jason Sugarman | December 28, 2001 | Live event | DeLand, FL | 1 | 1 | | |
| 35 | Heavenly Bodies (Chris Nelson and Vito DeNucci) | December 29, 2001 | Live event | Live Oak, FL | 2 | 28 | | |
| 36 | Disturbing Behavior (Jeff Daniels and Tim Renesto) | January 26, 2002 | Live event | Columbia, TN | 1 | 81 | | |
| 37 | Heavenly Bodies (Chris Nelson and Vito DeNucci) | April 17, 2002 | Live event | Winter Haven, FL | 3 | 52 | | |
| 38 | Shane Twins (Mike Shane and Todd Shane) | June 8, 2002 | Live event | Lima, Peru | 1 | 20 | | |
| — | Vacated | June 28, 2002 | Live event | St. Petersburg, FL | — | — | The Shane Twins vacated the titles per request of Total Nonstop Action Wrestling (TNA), which gained full control over the titles. | |
Total Nonstop Action Wrestling (NWA)
| 39 | A.J. Styles and Jerry Lynn | July 3, 2002 | Weekly pay-per-view event #3 | Nashville, TN | 1 | 42 | Lynn and Styles defeated the Rainbow Express (Bruce and Lenny Lane) in a tournament final to win the vacant championship. | |
| — | Vacated | August 14, 2002 | Weekly pay-per-view event #9 | Nashville, TN | — | — | A.J. Styles and Jerry Lynn were stripped of the championship by "Bullet" Bob Armstrong after a double-pin against Jeff Jarrett and Ron Killings. | |
| 40 | America's Most Wanted (Chris Harris and James Storm) | September 18, 2002 | Weekly pay-per-view event #13 | Nashville, TN | 1 | 56 | America's Most Wanted won a Gauntlet for the Gold match to win the vacant championship. | |
| 41 | Disciples of The New Church (Brian Lee and Slash) | November 13, 2002 | Weekly pay-per-view event #21 | Nashville, TN | 1 | 56 | | |
| 42 | America's Most Wanted (Chris Harris and James Storm) | January 8, 2003 | Weekly pay-per-view event #27 | Nashville, TN | 2 | 14 | | |
| 43 | Triple X (Christopher Daniels, Low Ki and Elix Skipper) | January 22, 2003 | Weekly pay-per-view event #29 | Nashville, TN | 1 | 14 | Although Low Ki and Skipper won the title, all three members were recognized as champions under the Freebird Rule. | |
| — | Vacated | February 5, 2003 | Weekly pay-per-view event #31 | Nashville, TN | — | — | Triple X were stripped from the championship after a double-pin against The Disciples of the New Church (Brian Lee and Slash). | |
| 44 | Triple X (Christopher Daniels, Low Ki and Elix Skipper) | March 12, 2003 | Weekly pay-per-view event #36 | Nashville, TN | 2 | 35 | Daniels and Low Ki defeated America's Most Wanted (Chris Harris and James Storm) to win the vacant championship. | |
| 45 | Amazing Red and Jerry Lynn | April 16, 2003 | Weekly pay-per-view event #41 | Nashville, TN | 1 (1, 2) | 21 | Lynn and Red defeated Christopher Daniels and Elix Skipper. | |
| 46 | Triple X (Christopher Daniels, Low Ki and Elix Skipper) | May 7, 2003 | Weekly pay-per-view event #44 | Nashville, TN | 3 | 49 | Daniels won a handicap match by disqualification. | |
| 47 | America's Most Wanted (Chris Harris and James Storm) | June 25, 2003 | Weekly pay-per-view event #51 | Nashville, TN | 3 | 63 | America's Most Wanted defeated Christopher Daniels and Elix Skipper in a steel cage match. | |
| 48 | Simon Diamond and Johnny Swinger | August 27, 2003 | Weekly pay-per-view event #60 | Nashville, TN | 1 | 84 | | |
| — | Vacated | November 19, 2003 | Weekly pay-per-view event #71 | Nashville, TN | — | — | Senior referee Rudy Charles declared the titles held up after a double pin when Ron Killings hit a German suplex into a bridge and referees Andrew Thomas and Mike Posey made simultaneous three counts. | |
| 49 | 3Live Kru (B.G. James, Konnan and Ron Killings) | November 26, 2003 | Weekly pay-per-view event #72 | Nashville, TN | 1 | 63 | 3Live Kru defeated Johnny Swinger, Glenn Gilberti and Simon Diamond in a six-man tag team match to win the vacant championship. 3LK defended the titles under the Freebird Rule. | |
| 50 | The Red Shirt Security (Joe Legend and Kevin Northcutt) | January 28, 2004 | Weekly pay-per-view event #79 | Nashville, TN | 1 (1, 2) | 7 | The Red Shirt Security defeated B.G. James and Ron Killings. | |
| 51 | Abyss and A.J. Styles | February 4, 2004 | Weekly pay-per-view event #80 | Nashville, TN | 1 (1, 2) | 28 | | |
| — | Vacated | March 3, 2004 | Weekly pay-per-view event #84 | Nashville, TN | — | — | Abyss and A.J. Styles were stripped from the championship by Vince Russo for failure to defend the title. | |
| 52 | Dallas and Kid Kash | March 31, 2004 | Weekly pay-per-view event #88 | Nashville, TN | 1 | 14 | Dallas and Kash defeated Triple X (Christopher Daniels and Low Ki) in a tournament final to win the vacant championship. This aired on April 7, 2004. | |
| 53 | D-Lo Brown and Apolo | April 14, 2004 | Weekly pay-per-view event #90 | Nashville, TN | 1 | 7 | Apolo and Brown won the championship by disqualification. | |
| 54 | Dallas and Kid Kash | April 21, 2004 | Weekly pay-per-view event #91 | Nashville, TN | 2 | 43 | Dallas and Kash won the championship by disqualification. | |
| 55 | America's Most Wanted (Chris Harris and James Storm) | June 3, 2004 | Impact! | Orlando, FL | 4 | 34 | This episode aired on tape delay on June 4, 2004. | |
| 56 | The Naturals (Andy Douglas and Chase Stevens) | July 7, 2004 | Weekly pay-per-view event #102 | Nashville, TN | 1 | 63 | | |
| 57 | Chris Harris and Elix Skipper | September 8, 2004 | Weekly pay-per-view event #111 | Nashville, TN | 1 (5, 4) | 13 | | |
| 58 | Christopher Daniels and James Storm | September 21, 2004 | Impact! | Orlando, FL | 1 (4, 5) | 21 | This episode aired on tape delay on September 24, 2004. | |
| 59 | Team Canada (Bobby Roode and Eric Young) | October 12, 2004 | Impact! | Orlando, FL | 1 | 26 | This episode aired on tape delay on October 15, 2004. | |
| 60 | 3Live Kru (B.G. James, Konnan and Ron Killings) | November 7, 2004 | Victory Road | Orlando, FL | 2 | 28 | James and Konnan won the championship. | |
| 61 | Team Canada (Bobby Roode and Eric Young) | December 5, 2004 | Turning Point | Orlando, FL | 2 | 42 | Team Canada defeated B.G. James and Ron Killings to win the championship. | |
| 62 | America's Most Wanted (Chris Harris and James Storm) | January 16, 2005 | Final Resolution | Orlando, FL | 5 (6, 6) | 100 | | |
| 63 | The Naturals (Andy Douglas and Chase Stevens) | April 26, 2005 | Impact! | Orlando, FL | 2 | 162 | This episode aired on tape delay on April 29, 2005. | |
| — | Vacated | October 5, 2005 | Live event | Springfield, TN | — | — | The championship is held up after a match against Eric Young and Cassidy Riley. | |
| 64 | The Naturals (Andy Douglas and Chase Stevens) | October 8, 2005 | 57th Anniversary Show | Nashville, TN | 3 | 3 | The Naturals defeated Eric Young and Cassidy Riley in a "Nashville Street Fight". | |
| 65 | America's Most Wanted (Chris Harris and James Storm) | October 11, 2005 | Impact! | Orlando, FL | 6 (7, 7) | 250 | This episode aired on tape delay on October 22, 2005. | |
| 66 | A.J. Styles and Christopher Daniels | June 18, 2006 | Slammiversary | Orlando, FL | 1 (3, 5) | 57 | This was a Last Chance match | |
| 67 | The Latin American Xchange (Hernandez and Homicide) | August 14, 2006 | Impact! | Orlando, FL | 1 | 41 | This was a Border Brawl match. Aired on tape delay August 24, 2006. | |
| 68 | A.J. Styles and Christopher Daniels | September 24, 2006 | No Surrender | Orlando, FL | 2 (4, 6) | 28 | This was an Ultimate X match. | |
| 69 | The Latin American Xchange (Hernandez and Homicide) | October 22, 2006 | Bound for Glory | Plymouth Township, MI | 2 | 175 | This was a Six Sides of Steel match. | |
| 70 | Team 3D (Brother Devon and Brother Ray) | April 15, 2007 | Lockdown | St. Charles, MO | 1 | 28 | This was an Electrified Six Sides of Steel match. | |
| — | Vacated | May 13, 2007 | Live event | Charlotte, NC | — | — | Team 3D (Brother Devon and Brother Ray) is stripped of the championship when NWA and TNA sever their business relationship. NWA regains control of the titles while TNA creates the new TNA World Tag Team Championship. | |
National Wrestling Alliance (NWA)
| 71 | The Real American Heroes (Joey Ryan and Karl Anderson) | July 8, 2007 | Live event | McAllen, TX | 1 | 217 | The Real American Heroes defeated Billy Kidman and Sean Waltman, Incognito and Sicodelico Jr. in a three-way tag team match. | |
| 72 | Los Luchas (Phoenix Star and Zokre) | February 10, 2008 | Live event | Las Vegas, NV | 1 | 237 | | |
| 73 | The Skullkrushers (Keith Walker and Rasche Brown) | October 4, 2008 | Live event | Robstown, TX | 1 | 777 | | |
| 74 | Dark City Fight Club (Jon Davis and Kory Chavis) | November 20, 2010 | Live event | Milwaukee, WI | 1 | 162 | | |
| 75 | The Usual Suspects (A.J. Steele and Murder One) | May 1, 2011 | NWA RPW Memorial Mayhem (2011) | Warner Robins, GA | 1 | 14 | | |
| 76 | Dark City Fight Club (Jon Davis and Kory Chavis) | May 15, 2011 | NWA RPW live event | Warner Robins, GA | 2 | 580 | | |
| 77 | The Kingz of the Underground (Ryan Genesis and Scot Summers) | December 15, 2012 | NWA BOW December to Remember | San Antonio, TX | 1 | 126 | The Kingz of the Underground defeated Lance Hoyt and Kory Chavis for the title; Jon Davis was absent for "personal reasons" and had not teamed with Chavis in quite some time but the NWA never stripped the Dark City Fight Club of their championship. | |
| 78 | Killer Elite Squad (Davey Boy Smith Jr. and Lance Archer) | April 20, 2013 | NWA Houston Parade of Champions | Houston, TX | 1 (1, 3) | 203 | Archer and Smith's IWGP Tag Team Championship was also at stake in this match. | |
| 79 | IronGodz (Jax Dane and Rob Conway) | November 9, 2013 | Power Struggle | Osaka, Japan | 1 | 148 | This was a three-way tag team match, also involving Tencozy. The IronGodz won the first fall of a two-fall match; K.E.S (Davey Boy Smith Jr. and Lance Archer) regained the IWGP Tag Team Championship in the other. Conway was also the reigning NWA World Heavyweight Champion, making him the first wrestler to hold both championships simultaneously. | |
| 80 | Tencozy (Hiroyoshi Tenzan and Satoshi Kojima) | April 6, 2014 | Invasion Attack | Tokyo, Japan | 1 | 190 | | |
| 81 | Killer Elite Squad (Davey Boy Smith Jr. and Lance Archer) | October 13, 2014 | King of Pro-Wrestling | Tokyo, Japan | 2 (2, 4) | 362 | | |
| 82 | The Heatseekers (Elliott Russell and Sigmon) | October 10, 2015 | NWA Mid-South Presents Glory Lasts Forever | Dyersburg, TN | 1 | 55 | The Heatseekers defeated K.E.S (Davey Boy Smith Jr. and Lance Archer) and The Illuminati (Chase Owens and Chris Richards)/ | |
| 83 | The Iron Empire (Matt Riviera and Rob Conway) | December 4, 2015 | NWA Mid-South Presents: Wrestling at the Resorts Casino | Robinsonville, MS | 1 (1, 2) | 280 | | |
| 84 | The Heatseekers (Elliott Russell and Sigmon) | September 9, 2016 | NWA Mid-South | Ripley, TN | 2 | 1 | | |
| 85 | The Iron Empire (Matt Riviera and Rob Conway) | September 10, 2016 | NWA Mid-South | Dyersburg, TN | 2 (2, 3) | 90 | | |
| 86 | The Heatseekers (Elliott Russell and Sigmon) | December 9, 2016 | NWA Mid-South | Ripley, TN | 3 | 28 | | |
| 87 | The Iron Empire (Matt Riviera and Rob Conway) | January 6, 2017 | NWA Mid-South | Ripley, TN | 3 (3, 4) | 48 | | |
| 88 | Kazushi Miyamoto and Rob Terry | February 23, 2017 | Diamond Stars Wrestling | Tokyo, Japan | 1 | 114 | | |
| 89 | The Heatseekers (Elliott Russell and Sigmon) | June 17, 2017 | NWA Mid-South | Dyersburg, TN | 4 | 105 | | |
National Wrestling Alliance/Lightning One Inc.
| — | Vacated | September 30, 2017 | — | — | — | — | The championship was vacated when NWA terminated the contracts with its licenses. | |
| 90 | Villain Enterprises (Brody King and PCO) | April 27, 2019 | Crockett Cup | Concord, NC | 1 | 133 | This was the finals of the 2019 Crockett Cup tournament for the vacant championship | |
| 91 | The Wild Cards (Royce Isaacs and Thomas Latimer) | September 7, 2019 | Global Wars Espectacular | Villa Park, IL | 1 | 24 | | |
| 92 | Rock 'n' Roll Express (Ricky Morton and Robert Gibson) | October 1, 2019 | NWA Power | Atlanta, GA | 5 | 115 | This episode aired on tape delay on December 3, 2019. | |
| 93 | Eli Drake and James Storm | January 24, 2020 | Hard Times | Atlanta, GA | 1 (1, 8) | 291 | This was a Triple threat tag team match, also involving The Wild Cards (Royce Isaacs and Thomas Latimer). | |
| 94 | Aron Stevens and J. R. Kratos | November 10, 2020 | UWN Primetime Live #9 | Long Beach, CA | 1 | 292 | | |
| 95 | La Rebelión (Bestia 666 and Mecha Wolf 450) | August 29, 2021 | NWA 73rd Anniversary Show | St. Louis, MO | 1 | 286 | | |
| 96 | The Commonwealth Connection (Doug Williams and Harry Smith) | June 11, 2022 | Alwayz Ready | Knoxville, TN | 1 (1, 3) | 77 | | |
| — | Vacated | August 27, 2022 | — | — | — | — | The championship was vacated after Harry Smith suffered an illness that prevented him from defending the titles. | |
| 97 | La Rebelión (Bestia 666 and Mecha Wolf) | August 27, 2022 | NWA 74th Anniversary Show Night 1 | St. Louis, MO | 2 | 364 | Defeated Hawx Aerie (Luke Hawx and PJ Hawx) to win the vacant titles. | |
| 98 | Blunt Force Trauma (Carnage and Damage) | August 26, 2023 | NWA 75th Anniversary Show Night 1 | St. Louis, MO | 1 | 280 | | |
| 99 | Knox and Murdoch | June 1, 2024 | NWA Back To The Territories | Knoxville, TN | 1 | 441 | Aired on tape delay on September 3, 2024. | |
| 100 | The Immortals (JR Kratos and Odinson) | August 16, 2025 | NWA 77th Anniversary Show | Huntington, NY | 1 (2,1) | 243 | Aired on tape delay on November 18, 2025 as a special episode of Powerrr. | |
| 101 | The Country Gentlemen (AJ Cazana and KC Cazana) | April 25, 2026 | NWA Powerrr | Tampa, Florida | 1 | 204+ | Aired on tape delay on May 30, 2026. | |

== Combined reigns ==
As of November 15, 2026.

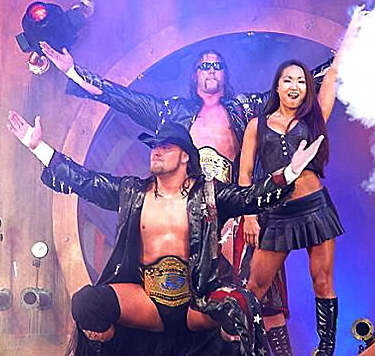
Record six-time champions America's Most Wanted (Chris Harris and James Storm)

Key

| † | Indicates the current champions |
| ¤ | The exact length of at least one title reign is uncertain; the combined length may not be correct. |

=== By team ===
| Rank | Team | No. of reigns | Combined days |
|---|---|---|---|
| 1 | The Skullkrushers (Keith Walker and Rasche Brown) | 1 | 777 |
| 2 | Dark City Fight Club (Jon Davis and Kory Chavis) | 2 | 742 |
| 3 | La Rebelión (Bestia 666 and Mecha Wolf 450) | 2 | 650 |
| 4 | Killer Elite Squad (Davey Boy Smith, Jr. and Lance Archer) | 2 | 565 |
| 5 | America's Most Wanted (Chris Harris and James Storm) | 6 | 517 |
| 6 | Knox and Murdoch | 1 | 441 |
| 7 | The Iron Empire (Matt Riviera and Rob Conway) | 3 | 418 |
| 8 | Heavenly Bodies (Chris Nelson and Vito DeNucci) | 3 | 328 |
| 9 | Aron Stevens and J. R. Kratos | 1 | 292 |
| 10 | Eli Drake and James Storm | 1 | 291 |
| 11 | Blunt Force Trauma (Carnage and Damage) | 1 | 280 |
| 12 | Rock 'n' Roll Express (Ricky Morton and Robert Gibson) | 5 | 264 |
| 13 | The Immortals (JR Kratos and Odinson) | 1 | 243 |
| 14 | Bad Attitude (David Young and Rick Michaels) | 3 | 237 |
| 14 | Los Luchas (Phoenix Star and Zokre) | 1 | 237 |
| 16 | Mr. Gannosuke and Tarzan Goto | 1 | 236¤ |
| 17 | The Brotherhood (Eric Sbraccia, Dukes Dalton, Knuckles Nelson and Rick Fuller) | 3 | 235 |
| 18 | The Naturals (Andy Douglas and Chase Stevens) | 3 | 228 |
| 19 | The Real American Heroes (Joey Ryan and Karl Anderson) | 1 | 217 |
| 20 | The Latin American Xchange (Hernandez and Homicide) | 2 | 216 |
| 21 | The Country Gentlemen † (AJ Cazana and KC Cazana) | 1 | 204+ |
| 22 | Tencozy (Hiroyoshi Tenzan and Satoshi Kojima) | 1 | 190 |
| 23 | The Heatseekers (Elliot Russell and Sigmon) | 4 | 189 |
| 24 | The Hollywood Blonds (Brian Pillman and Steve Austin) | 1 | 169 |
| 25 | xXx (Curtis Thompson and Drake Dawson) | 2 | 152 |
| 26 | IronGodz (Jax Dane and Rob Conway) | 1 | 148 |
| 27 | Team Extreme (Khris Germany and Kit Carson) | 2 | 140 |
| 28 | The Midnight Express (Bodacious Bart and Bombastic Bob) | 1 | 137 |
| 29 | Villain Enterprises (Brody King and PCO) | 1 | 133 |
| 30 | The Kingz of the Underground (Ryan Genesis and Scot Summers) | 1 | 126 |
| 31 | Kazushi Miyamoto and Rob Terry | 1 | 114 |
| 32 | Andersons (Pat Anderson and C. W. Anderson) | 1 | 109¤ |
| 33 | Ricky Steamboat and Shane Douglas | 1 | 104 |
| 34 | Triple X (Christopher Daniels, Elix Skipper and Low Ki) | 3 | 98 |
| 35 | 3Live Kru (B.G. James, Konnan and Ron Killings) | 2 | 91 |
| 35 | Simon and Swinger (Johnny Swinger and Simon Diamond) | 1 | 91 |
| 37 | A.J. Styles and Christopher Daniels | 2 | 85 |
| 38 | Disturbing Behavior (Jeff Daniels and Tim Renesto) | 1 | 81 |
| 39 | The Commonwealth Connection (Doug Williams and Harry Smith) | 1 | 77 |
| 40 | Miracle Violence Connection (Steve Williams and Terry Gordy) | 1 | 71 |
| 41 | Team Canada (Bobby Roode and Eric Young) | 2 | 68 |
| 42 | Barry Windham and Dustin Rhodes | 1 | 58 |
| 43 | Dallas and Kid Kash | 2 | 57 |
| 44 | Disciples of The New Church (Brian Lee and Slash) | 1 | 56 |
| 45 | The Border Patrol (Agent Gunn and Agent Maxx) | 2 | 43 |
| 45 | A.J. Styles and Jerry Lynn | 1 | 42 |
| 46 | The Headbangers (Mosh and Thrasher) | 1 | 41 |
| 47 | A.J. Styles and Abyss | 1 | 28 |
| 47 | Barry Windham and Tully Blanchard | 1 | 28 |
| 47 | Team 3D (Brother Devon and Brother Ray) | 1 | 28 |
| 50 | The Wild Cards (Royce Isaacs and Thomas Latimer) | 1 | 24 |
| 51 | Christopher Daniels and James Storm | 1 | 21 |
| 51 | Amazing Red and Jerry Lynn | 1 | 21 |
| 51 | Murder Incorporated (Jimmy James and Kevin Northcutt) | 1 | 21 |
| 54 | Shane Twins (Mike and Todd) | 1 | 20 |
| 55 | Arn Anderson and Paul Roma | 1 | 14¤ |
| 55 | Bad Street Boys (Christian York and Joey Matthews) | 1 | 14 |
| 55 | The Usual Suspects (A.J. Steele and Murder One) | 1 | 14 |
| 58 | Chris Harris and Elix Skipper | 1 | 13 |
| 59 | D-Lo Brown and Apolo | 1 | 7 |
| 59 | The Red Shirt Security (Joe Legend and Kevin Northcutt) | 1 | 7 |
| 61 | The Main Event (Reno Riggins and Steven Dunn) | 1 | 5 |
| 62 | Big Bubba Pain and L.A. Stephens | 1 | 2 |
| 62 | The Public Enemy (Johnny Grunge and Rocco Rock) | 1 | 2 |
| 64 | Dan Factor and David Flair | 1 | 1 |
| 64 | Glacier and Jason Sugarman | 1 | 1 |

=== By wrestler ===
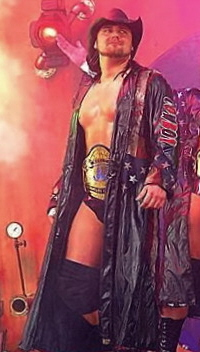
Record eight-time champion as an individual James Storm

| Rank | Wrestler | No. of reigns | Combined days |
|---|---|---|---|
| 1 | James Storm | 8 | 829 |
| 2 | Keith Walker | 1 | 777 |
| 2 | Rasche Brown | 1 | 777 |
| 4 | Jon Davis | 2 | 742 |
| 4 | Kory Chavis | 2 | 742 |
| 6 | Bestia 666 | 2 | 652 |
| 6 | Mecha Wolf 450 | 2 | 652 |
| 8 | Davey Boy Smith Jr./Harry Smith | 3 | 642 |
| 9 | Dallas/Lance Archer | 4 | 622 |
| 10 | Rob Conway | 4 | 566 |
| 11 | J. R. Kratos | 2 | 535 |
| 12 | Chris Harris | 7 | 530 |
| 13 | Knox | 1 | 441 |
| 13 | Murdoch | 1 | 441 |
| 15 | Matt Riviera | 3 | 418 |
| 16 | Vito DeNucci | 3 | 328 |
| 16 | Chris Nelson | 3 | 328 |
| 18 | Aron Stevens | 1 | 292 |
| 19 | Eli Drake | 1 | 291 |
| 20 | Carnage | 1 | 280 |
| 20 | Damage | 1 | 280 |
| 22 | Ricky Morton | 5 | 264 |
| 22 | Robert Gibson | 5 | 264 |
| 24 | Odinson | 1 | 243 |
| 25 | David Young | 3 | 237 |
| 25 | Rick Michaels | 3 | 237 |
| 25 | Phoenix Star | 1 | 237 |
| 25 | Zokre | 1 | 237 |
| 29 | Mr. Gannosuke | 1 | 236¤ |
| 29 | Tarzan Goto | 1 | 236¤ |
| 31 | Knuckles Nelson | 3 | 235 |
| 32 | Andy Douglas | 3 | 228 |
| 32 | Chase Stevens | 3 | 228 |
| 34 | Joey Ryan | 1 | 217 |
| 34 | Karl Anderson | 1 | 217 |
| 36 | Hernandez | 2 | 216 |
| 36 | Homicide | 2 | 216 |
| 38 | AJ Cazana † | 1 | 204+ |
| 38 | KC Cazana † | 1 | 204+ |
| 40 | Christopher Daniels | 6 | 204 |
| 41 | Hiroyoshi Tenzan | 1 | 190 |
| 41 | Satoshi Kojima | 1 | 190 |
| 43 | Elliot Russell | 4 | 189 |
| 43 | Sigmon Russell | 4 | 189 |
| 45 | Brian Pillman | 1 | 169 |
| 45 | Steve Austin | 1 | 169 |
| 47 | A.J. Styles | 4 | 155 |
| 48 | Curtis Thompson | 2 | 152 |
| 48 | Drake Dawson | 2 | 152 |
| 50 | Jax Dane | 1 | 148 |
| 51 | Khris Germany | 2 | 140 |
| 51 | Kit Carson | 2 | 140 |
| 53 | Bodacious Bart | 1 | 137 |
| 53 | Bombastic Bob | 1 | 137 |
| 55 | Brody King | 1 | 133 |
| 55 | PCO | 1 | 133 |
| 57 | Eric Sbraccia | 1 | 130 |
| 58 | Ryan Genesis | 1 | 126 |
| 58 | Scot Summers | 1 | 126 |
| 60 | Kazushi Miyamoto | 1 | 114 |
| 60 | Rob Terry | 1 | 114 |
| 62 | Elix Skipper | 4 | 111 |
| 63 | C. W. Anderson | 1 | 109¤ |
| 63 | Pat Anderson | 1 | 109¤ |
| 65 | Ricky Steamboat | 1 | 104 |
| 65 | Shane Douglas | 1 | 104 |
| 67 | Dukes Dalton | 1 | 98 |
| 67 | Low Ki | 3 | 98 |
| 69 | B.G. James | 2 | 91 |
| 69 | Konnan | 2 | 91 |
| 69 | Johnny Swinger | 1 | 91 |
| 69 | Simon Diamond | 1 | 91 |
| 69 | Ron Killings | 2 | 91 |
| 74 | Barry Windham | 2 | 86 |
| 75 | Jeff Daniels | 1 | 81 |
| 75 | Tim Renesto | 1 | 81 |
| 77 | Doug Williams | 1 | 77 |
| 78 | Steve Williams | 1 | 71 |
| 78 | Terry Gordy | 1 | 71 |
| 80 | Bobby Roode | 2 | 68 |
| 80 | Eric Young | 2 | 68 |
| 82 | Jerry Lynn | 2 | 63 |
| 83 | Dustin Rhodes | 1 | 58 |
| 84 | Kid Kash | 2 | 57 |
| 85 | Brian Lee | 1 | 56 |
| 85 | Slash | 1 | 56 |
| 87 | Agent Gunn | 2 | 43 |
| 87 | Agent Maxx | 2 | 43 |
| 89 | Mosh | 1 | 41 |
| 89 | Thrasher | 1 | 41 |
| 91 | Kevin Northcutt | 2 | 28 |
| 91 | Abyss | 1 | 28 |
| 91 | Brother Devon | 1 | 28 |
| 91 | Brother Ray | 1 | 28 |
| 91 | Tully Blanchard | 1 | 28 |
| 96 | Royce Isaacs | 1 | 24 |
| 96 | Thomas Latimer | 1 | 24 |
| 98 | Amazing Red | 1 | 21 |
| 98 | Jimmy James | 1 | 21 |
| 100 | Mike Shane | 1 | 20 |
| 100 | Todd Shane | 1 | 20 |
| 102 | A.J. Steele | 1 | 14 |
| 102 | Arn Anderson | 1 | 14¤ |
| 102 | Christian York | 1 | 14 |
| 102 | Joey Matthews | 1 | 14 |
| 102 | Murder One | 1 | 14 |
| 102 | Paul Roma | 1 | 14¤ |
| 108 | D-Lo Brown | 1 | 7 |
| 108 | Apolo | 1 | 7 |
| 108 | Joe Legend | 1 | 7 |
| 108 | Rick Fuller | 1 | 7 |
| 112 | Reno Riggins | 1 | 5 |
| 112 | Steven Dunn | 1 | 5 |
| 114 | Big Bubba Pain | 1 | 2 |
| 114 | Johnny Grunge | 1 | 2 |
| 114 | L.A. Stephens | 1 | 2 |
| 114 | Rocco Rock | 1 | 2 |
| 118 | Dan Factor | 1 | 1 |
| 118 | David Flair | 1 | 1 |
| 118 | Glacier | 1 | 1 |
| 118 | Jason Sugarman | 1 | 1 |

== See also ==
- NWA World Tag Team Championship
- National Wrestling Alliance (NWA)
- Jim Crockett Promotions
- Impact Wrestling
