= Bad Street Boys =

Professional wrestling tag team

Stable
- Members: Gregory Helms; Christian York; Joey Matthews; Shannon Moore
- Name(s): Bad Street Boys
- Debut: 1997
- Years active: 1997–2008

In professional wrestling, the Bad Street Boys was a stable and tag team that competed on the independent circuit. It was initially composed of Gregory Helms, Shannon Moore, Joey Matthews, and Christian York, being reduced to York and Matthews when Helms and Moore were signed by World Championship Wrestling (WCW).

== History ==
=== Independent circuit (1997–1999) ===
In 1997, four young independent circuit wrestlers - Gregory Helms, Shannon Moore, Joey Matthews and Christian York - formed a stable Badstreet Boys that wrestled in many independent promotions, including Organization of Modern Extreme Grappling Arts (OMEGA).

York and Matthews would often team up with each other and won the Mid-Eastern Wrestling Federation (MEWF) Tag Team Championship on October 23, 1997, defeating Steve Corino and Jimmy Cicero and fellow challengers Mark Schrader and Corporal Punishment in a Three Way Match. On November 13, York and Matthews were beaten for the titles by Jimmy Cicero and Julio Sanchez. On December 20, 1998, York and Matthews won their second tag team championship by defeating The Blue Meanie and Super Nova for the Steel City Wrestling (SCW) Tag Team Championship. On April 1, 1999, they lost the titles to Lou Marconi and Dennis Gregory.

=== WCW, WWF and ECW (1999–2001) ===
In May 1999, all the four members of Badstreet Boys signed contracts with World Championship Wrestling (WCW). They all were given tryout matches on Monday Nitro. Helms and Moore were given full-time contracts. York and Matthews were released. They continued to use the Bad Street Boys name and would win the Atlantic Terror City Wrestling (ATCW) Tag Team Championship on January 15, 2000. On May 17, York and Matthews won their first Maryland Championship Wrestling (MCW) Tag Team Championship, by defeating The Holy Rollers (Rich Myers and Earl the Pearl). They lost the ATCW Tag Team Titles to Jimmy Cicero and Dino Divine on July 15. On August 2, they lost the MCW Tag Team Title to Christopher Carmichael and Dino Divine.

Back in April 2000, York and Matthews signed contracts with World Wrestling Federation (WWF). The team were sent to WWF's partner, Extreme Championship Wrestling (ECW). They worked in ECW as a fan favorite tag team. In ECW, Bad Street Boys had their first rivalry with Danny Doring and Roadkill, that culminated in a match at Anarchy Rulz, which Doring and Roadkill won. Bad Street Boys' next feud was with Simon Diamond and Johnny Swinger. They lost to Diamond and Swinger at November to Remember. However, they defeated Diamond and Swinger in a rematch at Massacre on 34th Street. At ECW's final pay-per-view Guilty as Charged, Bad Street Boys lost to Jerry Lynn and Cyrus.

=== Return to the independent circuit (2001–2008) ===
After ECW's closure, Bad Street Boys returned to wrestling in the independent circuit. On February 3, 2001, Bad Street Boys defeated Bad Attitude (David Young and Rick Michaels) for the National Wrestling Alliance (NWA) World Tag Team Championship. On February 17, Bad Street Boys lost the titles back to Bad Attitude. Shortly thereafter, they returned to Maryland Championship Wrestling. On November 23, Bad Street Boys defeated The Holy Rollers (Rich Myers and Earl the Pearl) for their second MCW Tag Team Championship. On December 1, they defeated Ray Storm and Mark Anthony for the Virginia Championship Wrestling (VCW) Tag Team Championship. The titles were vacated on some unknown date in 2001. On May 22, 2002, Bad Street Boys lost the MCW Tag Team Titles to Dino Divine and Chad Bowman.

On February 15, 2002, Bad Street Boys appeared at Pro-Pain Pro Wrestling (3PW) for the promotion's inaugural show. They teamed with Ric Blade against CM Punk, Colt Cabana and Paul E Normous in a Six-Man Tag Team Match. Bad Street Boys and Ric Blade won the match. Bad Street Boys continued to wrestle in 3PW as well as Ring of Honor (ROH). They appeared at the first weekly pay-per-view event of Total Nonstop Action (TNA) Wrestling on June 19, losing to The Dupps (Stan and Bo). Bad Street Boys wrestled in 3PW, ROH, TNA, World Wrestling Entertainment (WWE) and Xtreme Pro Wrestling (XPW) in 2002 and 2003.

Matthews was eventually signed to a WWE contract, ending the team. On September 29, 2007, Bad Street Boys reunited against The Murder City Machine Guns (Chris Sabin and Alex Shelley) in a losing effort at an All American Wrestling (AAW) event titled Rise of the Machine Guns. The team later returned to Maryland Championship Wrestling. On August 23, 2008, the team had their last match at an MCW event Summer Heat in which they were defeated by Derek Frazier and Ruckus.

== Championships and accomplishments ==
- Atlantic Terror Championship Wrestling
  - ATCW Tag Team Championship (1 time)
- Maryland Championship Wrestling
  - MCW Tag Team Championship (2 times)
- Mid-Eastern Wrestling Federation
  - MEWF Tag Team Championship (1 time)
- National Wrestling Alliance
  - NWA World Tag Team Championship (1 time)
- Steel City Wrestling
  - SCW Tag Team Championship (1 time)
- Virginia Championship Wrestling
  - VCW Tag Team Championship (1 time)
