= Dukes Dalton =

American professional wrestler (born 1976)

Personal information
- Born: James McCarthy; June 2, 1976 (age 50) Boston, Massachusetts, U.S.

Professional wrestling career
- Ring name: Dukes Dalton
- Billed height: 6 ft 3 in (1.91 m)
- Billed weight: 235 lb (107 kg)
- Billed from: Kansas City, Kansas
- Trained by: Killer Kowalski
- Debut: May 26, 1995

James "Jim" McCarthy (born June 2, 1976) is an American professional wrestler and trainer, best known by his ring name Dukes Dalton. He competes on the independent circuit in the Northeastern United States. He has wrestled for the Century Wrestling Alliance, the National Wrestling Alliance, and Chaotic Wrestling where he was inducted into its hall of fame in 2008. He also made brief appearances in the World Wrestling Federation in 1999 and 2001, both as a singles wrestler and with tag team partner Knuckles Nelson.

McCarthy was one of the founding members of Tony Rumble's The Brotherhood, a "heel" stable which dominated NWA New England during the late 1990s, with Nelson, Eric Sbraccia and Rick Fuller. When Sbraccia became injured shortly after winning the NWA World Tag Team Championship with Nelson in 1998, he and Fuller filled in to defend the title. He and Nelson also won the NWA New England Tag Team Championship and defended both tag team titles in their home promotion for nearly two years.

As an instructor with Mike Hollow at the Chaotic Training Center in North Andover, Massachusetts, he has been involved in training Chase Del Monte, Chris Harvard, Chad Dick and both Bryan & Matt Logan, the latter two a successful tag team in Chaotic Wrestling, the East Coast Wrestling Association and New England Championship Wrestling. Todd Sinclair, a senior official with Ring of Honor, received much of his professional knowledge and referee training from McCarthy and Hollow while a student there.

== Career ==
=== NWA New England (1998–2000) ===
After making his official debut on May 26, 1995, James McCarthy spent over two years on the independent circuit before entering NWA New England as Dukes Dalton. He immediately aligned himself with The Brotherhood, a newly formed "heel" stable under manager Tony Rumble, which then included Eric Sbraccia, Knuckles Nelson and Rick Fuller. In 1998, Sbraccia and Nelson won the NWA World Tag Team Championship at the NWA 50th Anniversary Show. When Sbraccia suffered an injury early into their title reign, McCarthy and Fuller filled for Sbraccia by helping Nelson defend the tag team titles both in NWA New England and occasionally in other NWA territories.

When a snowstorm forced Sbraccia and Nelson to cancel a scheduled title defense in North Richland Hills, Texas, on March 3, the titles were held up. Several days following this, McCarthy teamed with Knuckles Nelson to defeat Jason Rage & Slyk Wagner Brown at a house show in Southbridge, Massachusetts. Dalton would also gain an impressive singles victory over Trooper Gilmore, a one-time NWA New England Heavyweight Champion, at the Good Times Emporium in Somerville, Massachusetts on May 29.

The NWA World titles were returned to The Brotherhood on June 10 after a rematch in Dallas, Texas, but a week later Nelson and Rick Fuller lost the belts to The Public Enemy (Rocco Rock & Johnny Grunge) in Bolton, Massachusetts. On June 19, McCarthy and Nelson took back the titles in Dorchester. On July 12, they fought to a no-contest against Mike Hollow & "Mr. USA" Tony Atlas in Swansea, Massachusetts. He and Nelson also defeated The Arc Angels (Damon D'Arcangelo & Phoenix King) to win the NWA New England Tag Team titles in Somerville on August 22. would defend these titles, as well as the NWA World Tag Team titles, for another month. McCarthy and Nelson eventually lost the NWA World Tag Team titles to the New York Posse (Curtis Slamdawg & Jay Kobain) at the Good Time Emporium on September 22.

On September 25, he and Nelson lost the NWA World Tag Team titles to Team Extreme (Kit Carson & Khris Germany) at the NWA 51st Anniversary Show at the Grady Cole Center in Charlotte, North Carolina. Team Extreme had won a six-team tournament to earn a title shot at the world champions. He and Dalton would regain the belts a final time, beating the New York Posse in Thomaston, Connecticut, on October 2, and would continue to hold the belts until the stable split up early the next year. At the end of the month, McCarthy also made his first WWF appearance on WWF Jakked/Metal with Nelson against The Headbangers (Mosh & Thrasher).

McCarthy made a second WWF appearance when he and Nelson once again took on, and lost to, The Headbangers on the December 11th edition of WWF Jakked. On December 30, 1999, Dalton appeared at a special supercard promoted by Ultimate Professional Wrestling, Slam & Jam, which was the "grand finale" to the United States Marines "Toys for Tots" toy collection program during the Christmas holiday season. The event was broadcast worldwide and featured over 20 wrestlers from the World Wrestling Federation, World Championship Wrestling, Extreme Championship Wrestling and others. Also performing at the event were rock bands Riot Act and Motorplanet, both of which having been featured on MTV and ESPN. Dalton teamed with The Boston Brawler in an interpromotional match against WCW's The Power Company (Dave & Dean Power), a match which they lost.

=== Chaotic Wrestling (2001–2003) ===
Following the breakup of The Brotherhood, McCarthy left NWA New England in early 2000 and spent the next year in various independent promotions. On April 14, he made his third appearance on WWF Jakked wrestling Haku in the opening match. He had a brief stint in New England Championship Wrestling before joining Chaotic Wrestling in the summer of 2001. In one of his first matches, he teamed with Slyk Wagner Brown against "Babyface" Vince Vicallo & R. J. Brewer in Methuen, Massachusetts, on June 23. This match was later aired on the promotion's weekly television show Friday Night Chaos. Later that year, he wrestled The Boston Brawler in Lawrence, Massachusetts, on September 7. Both men were accompanied by valets Brittany Summer and The Boston Babe respectively.

On December 14, 2001, McCarthy beat "Intellectual" Arch Kincaid in Lawrence for the Chaotic Wrestling Light Heavyweight Championship. Less than two months later, he would defeat John Walters in Lowell, Massachusetts, to unify Chaotic Wrestling Light Heavyweight and Television Championship titles. Both titles would be retired when McCarthy won the Chaotic Wrestling New England Championship from "Latin Fury" Luis Ortiz in Revere, Massachusetts, on May 18, 2001. He lost the title back to Ortiz in Lawrence a week later.

McCarthy regained the title from John Walters in Lowell on February 16, 2002. He then began feuding with Billy Kryptonite, his valet Brittany Summer leaving him for Kryptonite, and held on to the title for over five months while enduring frequent outside interference from them during his matches. He finally agreed to meet them in a handicap match at the supercard Cold Fury 2: Last Call. According to Rich Palladino, longtime color commentator for Chaotic Wrestling, if either Billy Kryptonite or Brittany pinned the champion, the person who made a pinfall or submission would win the New England title. If McCarthy pinned either of his opponents, he too would win the match. The event was held on January 11, 2003, at a local middle school in North Andover, Massachusetts. During the match, McCarthy was able to put his ex-valet in a Death Valley driver but lost the title to Kryptonite.

Teaming with former rival Arch Kincaid, he made a failed effort to win the Chaotic Wrestling Tag Team Championship from Attrition (Studd and Angers) in Methuen, Massachusetts, on March 7. McCarthy started teaming with Tim McNeany as The Local Legends and, that June, were the sole survivors in an 8-man Survivor Series-rules tag team match held in Tewksbury, Massachusetts. He also briefly competed for Crimson Mask Wrestling, a short-lived wrestling promotion based in Waterbury, Connecticut, established by NWA New England wrestlers Jaime Pain and Nemesis.

=== Chaotic Training Center and semi-retirement (2004–) ===
Soon afterwards, McCarthy limited his in-ring schedule so he could spend more time as an instructor at the Chaotic Training Center in North Andover, Massachusetts, with Mike Hollow. During the next few years, he and Hollow would help train a number high-profile wrestlers including Chase Del Monte, Chris Harvard, Chad Dick and brothers Bryan & Matt Logan. On March 18, 2005, he and "Big Man on Campus" Craig Stratton wrestled the Logan Brothers losing to them at a house show at the Polish-American Veterans Club in Lowell.

On February 8, 2008, McCarthy and Arch Kincaid were inducted in a formal ceremony to the Chaotic Wrestling Hall of Fame. The ceremony was interrupted by Max Bauer whose tirade against the two veterans resulted in a brawl. On October 26, 2008, Dalton appeared at a wrestling memorial event dedicated to Killer Kowalski who had died the previous month. He was one of a number of Kowalski's former students who were in attendance and included Mike Hollow, Tony Roy, John Rodeo, Freightrain Dan, Zachary Springate, Vito "Scorch" Carlucci, Richard Byrn, Terry Allen, Frankie Kazarian and Johnny Fabulous. J. J. Dillon, Ox Baker, Doink the Clown, Justin Credible and Spike Dudley also appeared at the show. All proceeds from the event went to the Killer Kowalski Fund set up at the Citizens Bank in Malden, Massachusetts, which would help pay Kowalski's medical bills.

== Championships and accomplishments ==
- Chaotic Wrestling
  - Chaotic Wrestling New England Championship (2 times)
  - Chaotic Wrestling Television Championship (1 time)
  - Chaotic Wrestling Light Heavyweight Championship (1 time)
  - Chaotic Wrestling Hall of Fame (2008)
- National Wrestling Alliance
  - NWA World Tag Team Championship (1 time) – with Knuckles Nelson
- NWA New England
  - NWA New England Tag Team Championship (2 times) – with Knuckles Nelson
- Pro Wrestling Illustrated
  - PWI ranked him #454 of the 500 best singles wrestlers of the PWI 500 in 2003
