= IronGodz =

Professional wrestling tag team

Tag team
- Members: Jax Dane; Rob Conway
- Name(s): IronGodz; Jax Dane and Rob Conway
- Billed heights: 6 ft 4 in (1.93 m) - Dane; 6 ft 2 in (1.88 m) - Conway
- Combined billed weight: 514 lb (233 kg)
- Debut: January 19, 2013

The IronGodz was a professional wrestling tag team, consisting of Jax Dane and Rob Conway, who were aligned with the National Wrestling Alliance (NWA) where they are former one-time NWA World Tag Team Champions.

== History ==
=== National Wrestling Alliance (2013–2015) ===
On January 19, 2013, Dane and Conway made their debut together for the National Wrestling Alliance teaming with Chris Marval defeating Alex Reigns, Ricky Starks and Vince Vile at the NWA Branded Out Wrestling New Years Revolution event. On February 14, 2014, The IronGodz (Jax Dane and Rob Conway) successfully defended the NWA World Tag Team Championships against The Lords of KAos (Damien Wayne and Lance Erikson) for NWA Southern All-Star Wrestling. On March 29, 2014, The IronGodz again successfully defended the NWA World Tag Team Championships under the NWA Smoky Mountain promotion defeating The Illuminati (Chase Owens and Chris Richards) and The Lords Of Kaos in a three-way tag team match. On June 2, 2014, Conway defeated Satoshi Kojima in Las Vegas to regain the NWA World Heavyweight Championship.

=== New Japan Pro-Wrestling (2013–2014) ===
On November 9, 2013, Dane and Conway made their New Japan Pro-Wrestling debuts as a team at Power Struggle, defeating K.E.S. (Davey Boy Smith, Jr. and Lance Archer) and Tencozy (Hiroyoshi Tenzan and Satoshi Kojima) in the first fall of a two-fall three-way match to win the NWA World Tag Team Championship. From November 23 to December 7, Dane and Conway now known as The IronGodz took part in New Japan's 2013 World Tag League, where they finished with a record of ten wins and three losses, failing to advance to the semifinals. On January 5, 2014, The IronGodz (Jax Dane and Rob Conway) successfully defended the NWA World Tag Team Championships against Tencozy. The IronGodz returned to New Japan on April 6 at Invasion Attack 2014, where they lost the NWA World Tag Team Championship to Tencozy. The following week, The IronGodz failed in their attempt to regain the NWA World Tag Team Championships from Tencozy on April 13. The IronGodz returned to New Japan in November to take part in the 2014 World Tag League. The team finished second to last in their block with a record of three wins and four losses.

== Championships and accomplishments ==
- National Wrestling Alliance
  - NWA World Heavyweight Championship (2 time) – Rob Conway
  - NWA National Heavyweight Championship (1 time) – Jax Dane
  - NWA World Tag Team Championship (1 time)
