= Rob Conway =

American professional wrestler (born 1972)

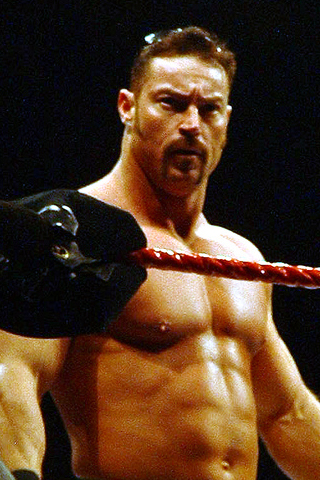
- Conway in 2006

Personal information
- Born: Robert Thomas Conway Jr. November 28, 1972 (age 53) Louisville, Kentucky, U.S.

Professional wrestling career
- Ring name(s): Conquistador Uno; Raging Robby; Rob Conway; Robért Conway
- Billed height: 6 ft 2 in (188 cm)
- Billed weight: 230 lb (104 kg)
- Billed from: New Albany, Indiana
- Trained by: Nightmare Danny Davis; Ohio Valley Wrestling
- Debut: 1997

Robert Thomas Conway Jr. (born November 28, 1972), is an American professional wrestler. He is best known for his work with World Wrestling Entertainment (WWE). Conway is also known for his work with the National Wrestling Alliance (NWA), where he is a former two-time NWA World Heavyweight Champion.

He is also a seven-time Tag Team Champion, becoming a three-time World Tag Team Champion with Sylvain Grenier as part of La Resistance in the WWE and four-time NWA World Tag Team Champion once as part of The IronGodz with Jax Dane and three-times as part of The Iron Empire with Matt Riviera in the NWA. He is currently the only wrestler to have held the NWA World Heavyweight and NWA World Tag Team Championships simultaneously.

== Professional wrestling career ==
=== Ohio Valley Wrestling (1997–2000) ===
Rob Conway began his career in Memphis Championship Wrestling (MCW) and Ohio Valley Wrestling (OVW), teaming with Nick Dinsmore under the names Limited Edition (MCW), the Borkcin Brothers, and the Lords of the Ring (OVW). While in OVW, he and Dinsmore were also members of Kenny Bolin's Bolin Services along with The Prototype, Bull Buchanan, and Mark Henry. As the Lords of the Ring, Conway and Dinsmore won the OVW Southern Tag Team Championship on 10 occasions and captured the MCW North American Tag Team Championship once. On April 28, 1999, Rob Conway defeated his partner Nick Dinsmore to win the OVW Heavyweight Championship, but lost it back to him the next week. Conway won the OVW Heavyweight Championship a second time on August 17, 1999, pinning Damaja. He lost the title to Rico Constantino on November 10, regaining it on September 6, 2000, with another victory over Dinsmore.

=== World Wrestling Federation/Entertainment ===
==== Early appearances (2000–2003) ====
Conway had dark matches previously with Kurt Angle and Headbanger Mosh, then known as Beaver Cleavage. Conway's TV debut in the World Wrestling Federation (WWF) was on the May 20, 2000, episode of Jakked, where he was defeated by Bull Buchanan. Over the next three years, Conway appeared in tryout matches on Velocity and Sunday Night Heat, losing to wrestlers such as A-Train, Randy Orton, and The Hurricane.

In a match taped for the July 17, 2003 episode of SmackDown!, Rob Conway and Nick Dinsmore appeared under masks as "Los Conquistadores", losing to Rey Mysterio and Billy Kidman. On July 27, at Vengeance, Conway once again competed as the masked Conquistador, this time with Johnny Jeter as his partner, as part of the APA Bar Room Brawl.

==== La Résistance (2003–2005) ====
Conway made his proper debut for the company on the August 18, 2003, episode of Raw, planted in the audience dressed as an American airman. After Conway was "harassed" by the heel tag team La Résistance (Sylvain Grenier and René Duprée), he was invited into the ring by The Dudley Boyz, who were then feuding with La Résistance. While "celebrating" with the Dudley Boyz and waving the American flag, Conway suddenly hit them both with the flagpole, revealing himself to be a member of La Résistance. The trio feuded with several tag teams, including the Dudley Boyz, Hurricane and Rosey, and Garrison Cade and Mark Jindrak. When Grenier suffered a back injury in October 2003, Dupree and Conway held the group together until the March 15, 2004 edition of Raw when Grenier returned. The trio did not last long after that, however, as Dupree was drafted to SmackDown! on March 22, 2004, during the Draft Lottery.

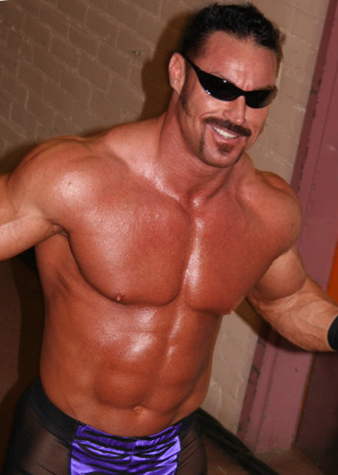
Conway making his entrance at a house show in 2005

Grenier and Conway, however, continued to team together as La Résistance on Raw. With American-Franco hostility subsiding, the WWE ceased billing the team as being from France and instead promoted them as being haughty French Canadians who carried the flag of Quebec to the ring, with Grenier often singing the Canadian national anthem and Conway becoming known as Robért Conway, the French version of his name. The team held the World Tag Team Championship three times. Their first title reign came when they defeated Chris Benoit and Edge on the May 31, 2004 edition of Raw in Grenier's home town of Montreal, Quebec. The team dropped the belts to the same team of Benoit and Edge at Taboo Tuesday on October 19 when, even though Edge walked out on Benoit, Benoit was able to defeat La Résistance by himself. It was not long before La Résistance reclaimed the tag team gold for the second time on the November 1 edition of Raw, defeating Chris Benoit after Edge walked out on Benoit again. This time La Résistance did not hold the title as long as their last reign; they lost the belts two weeks later on Raw when they faced the team of William Regal and Eugene as well as Tajiri and Rhyno.

In a 3-Way Elimination match, they dropped the title to Regal and Eugene. Their third, and final, Tag Team Title reign began at a Raw brand house show on January 16, 2005, in Winnipeg, Manitoba when they defeated Regal and Jonathan Coachman—Regal's actual partner, Eugene, had been injured and Coachman was selected to be his fill in partner, though Regal never tagged him in—to win the belts. La Résistance dropped the belts again a few weeks later on the February 7, edition of Raw, from Tokyo, Japan, to William Regal and his new tag team partner Tajiri.

La Résistance repeatedly attempted to regain the gold (mainly on Heat) from Regal and Tajiri in a number of different matches but fell just short each time. During their "last shot" the team thought they had won back the title only to have the decision reversed by referee Mike Chioda due to La Résistance not pinning the legal man. The match was restarted but La Résistance lost the match and their last chance against Regal and Tajiri in a normal tag team contest. The team was given one more chance at Regal and Tajiri, only this time during a Tag Team Turmoil match including five teams—La Résistance, Regal and Tajiri, The Heart Throbs (Romeo Roselli and Antonio Thomas), Simon Dean and Maven, and Rosey and The Hurricane, at Backlash. During the match La Résistance managed to eliminate the champions, but were defeated by the last remaining team (and winners of the match) Hurricane and Rosey.

==== Singles competition (2005–2006) ====
The team split in mid-May after repeatedly quarreling over which of them was the superior wrestler. Grenier and Conway went into singles competition with announcers claiming that the members of La Résistance were trying to "one up" each other in singles matches without the other man in their corner. This saw Conway defeat a jobber and Val Venis, while Grenier was defeated by both Venis and Chris Jericho. Both men competed in a triple threat match against Intercontinental Champion Shelton Benjamin for the title; Benjamin won the match not long after the La Résistance members began to argue and fight with each other. This altercation led to a main event match for the June 12 Heat (taped on June 6) in which Rob Conway portrayed the heel, and defeated Grenier. On June 30, 2005, Grenier was a last minute trade in the 2005 WWE Draft, sending him to SmackDown! while Conway stayed on the Raw brand. Conway then began wrestling in singles competition on both Heat and Raw.

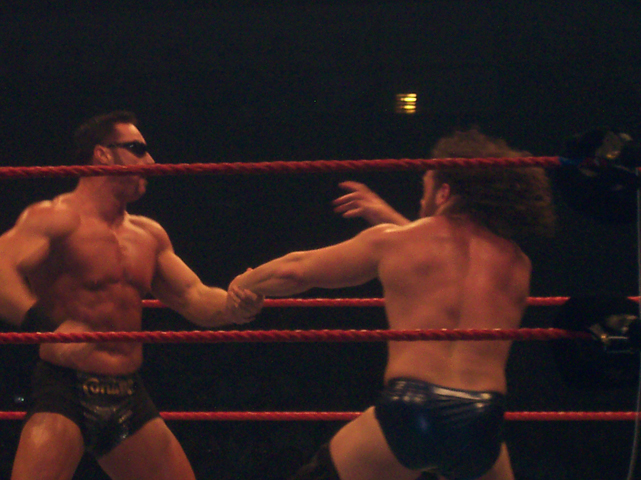
Conway wrestling Eugene in October 2005

On the July 17, 2005 edition of Heat Conway brought back his original identity of Rob Conway, making his new gimmick a narcissistic heel and developing a new appearance (similar to Buff Bagwell) including a biker hat, sunglasses, a mustache, see through tights, and a new haircut. He began referring to himself as "The Con-Man" Rob Conway. During the WWE Homecoming edition of Raw, Conway interrupted a segment involving a number of WWE Legends. After disrespecting the legends, they assaulted him. Conway, seeking retaliation, then went on to have matches against a number of legends, picking up wins over Doink the Clown, Greg Valentine (by disqualification), and Koko B. Ware.

During this time he would go on to begin feuding with Eugene, a big fan of the legends who stuck up for them. At the Taboo Tuesday pay-per-view, Conway teamed with Tomko to face Eugene and a legend (as voted for by the fans). Jimmy Snuka beat out Kamala and Jim Duggan in the voting to become Eugene's partner and picked up the win after a Superfly Splash ending Conway's winning streak. On the next Raw, Conway attempted to take the Intercontinental Championship from Ric Flair, but came up short when he was locked in Flair's figure four leglock.

After losing to Flair, Conway went on a long losing streak, losing almost every match he was in through the rest of the 2005 and the start of 2006. Conway went back to competing on Sunday Night Heat making few appearances on Raw and losing on every occasion. On the April 10, 2006 edition of Raw, Conway debuted a slightly changed look, including longer hair, no mustache, and blonde highlighted hair, in a loss to Rob Van Dam. Conway finally broke his losing streak for one night only on the May 12, 2006 edition of Heat when he won a mixed tag team match with Victoria against the team of Viscera and Torrie Wilson. It was short lived, however, as the next week he was defeated by Jim Duggan, restarting his losing streak but starting a short program with Duggan and his protege Eugene. At the start of August, Conway dropped the Con-Man Gimmick as he stopped wearing sunglasses and his ego dropped. From this point on, Conway was used as a tweener who was desperate to pick up a victory over anyone possible but failed every time he tried.

==== Return to OVW and Raw (2006–2007) ====
On the November 15 edition of Ohio Valley Wrestling (OVW), Conway made a surprise appearance, teaming with Sylvain Grenier to reform their old stable, La Résistance. The reformed team defeated Cody Runnels and Shawn Spears to earn a shot at the OVW Southern Tag Team Titles. The team, however, lost the title match.

After months of losing, Conway appeared on the January 1, 2007 edition of Raw. Conway proceeded to make a New Year's resolution and vowed that he would not lose another match and if he did he would quit Raw. His opponent was the Intercontinental Champion Jeff Hardy, but he was pinned after 21 seconds. After WWE Chairman Vince McMahon entered the ring and (instead of letting him quit Monday Night Raw) fired him. On May 11, 2007, WWE officially announced that Conway was released from his WWE contract.

=== Juggalo Championship Wrestling (2011) ===
Conway debuted in Juggalo Championship Wrestling at the event Hardcore Hell. Per storyline, he announced that he was a master of submissions and a wrestler for hire. That night, Conway submitted three different opponents to showcase his skills. Two weeks later, he was hired by Breyer Wellington to face JCW Heavyweight Champion Corporal Robinson, but was defeated. Conway then participated in Juggalo Championship Wrestling's first internet pay-per-view Hatchet Attacks, where he submitted Sal the Man of a Thousand Gimmicks. At Up in Smoke, Conway was hired by Sabu's manager Charlie Brown to attack 2 Tuff Tony. After Rhino scared off Sabu and Conway, a tag team match was scheduled between the two and Rhino and Tony at St. Andrews Brawl.

=== National Wrestling Alliance ===
==== NWA World Heavyweight Champion (2013–2015) ====
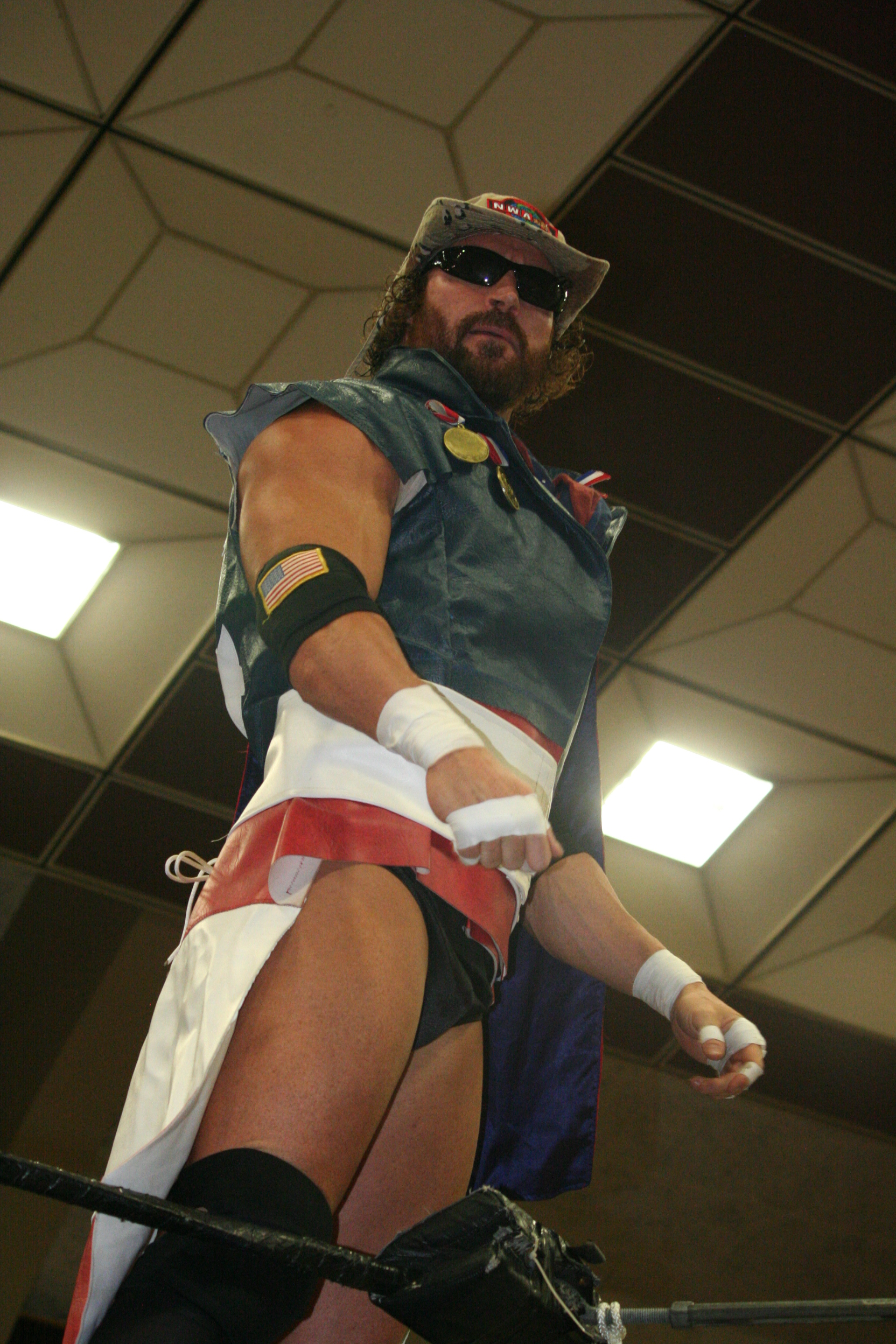
Conway during an event for New Japan Pro-Wrestling in May 2014

On March 16, 2013, Conway defeated Kahagas to win the National Wrestling Alliance (NWA) World Heavyweight Championship. Through NWA's working relationship with New Japan Pro-Wrestling, Conway appeared via video at New Japan's March 23 event announcing that he would be taking part in the promotion's April 7 Invasion Attack event. He was then challenged to a match for the NWA World Heavyweight Championship by Satoshi Kojima. Conway made his debut appearance for New Japan on April 5, when he, accompanied by NWA president Bruce Tharpe, had an in-ring confrontation with Kojima. Two days later, Conway defeated Kojima, following interference from Tharpe and fellow NWA wrestler Jax Dane, to retain the NWA World Heavyweight Championship. On April 20, Conway successfully defended the NWA World Heavyweight Championship against Chris Masters in Houston, Texas, after which he was presented a new title belt. On June 22, Conway returned to New Japan at Dominion 6.22, where he successfully defended the NWA World Heavyweight Championship against Manabu Nakanishi.

Conway would show up in a video on September 5, 2013, at NJPW IPPV at the Korauken Hall to challenge Jyushin Thunder Liger to a future title match. Liger came out after the video and accepted the challenge. On September 29 at Destruction, Conway defeated Liger to retain the NWA World Heavyweight Championship.

On November 9, Conway returned to NJPW at Power Struggle, where he and Jax Dane defeated K.E.S. (Davey Boy Smith Jr. and Lance Archer) and Tencozy (Hiroyoshi Tenzan and Satoshi Kojima) in the first fall of a two-fall three-way match to win the NWA World Tag Team Championship, making Conway a double champion and the first wrestler to simultaneously hold both the World Heavyweight and World Tag Team Championships. From November 23 to December 7, Dane and Conway took part in New Japan's 2013 World Tag League, where they finished with a record of three wins and three losses, failing to advance to the semifinals. Conway was pinned in only one of his team's three losses, which led to his defeater, Satoshi Kojima, challenging him to a rematch for the NWA World Heavyweight Championship.

On January 4, 2014, at Wrestle Kingdom 8 in Tokyo Dome, Conway lost the NWA World Heavyweight Championship to Kojima.

The following day, Conway pinned Kojima following a distraction from Bruce Tharpe and a low blow, when he and Dane successfully defended the NWA World Tag Team Championship against Tencozy. Conway and Dane returned to New Japan on April 6 at Invasion Attack 2014, where they lost the NWA World Tag Team Championship to Tencozy. On April 12, Conway received a rematch for the NWA World Heavyweight Championship during New Japan's trip to Taiwan, but he was again defeated by Kojima. The following day, Conway and Dane also failed in their attempt to regain the NWA World Tag Team Championship from Tencozy. Conway also failed to regain the title alongside Wes Brisco on May 25 at Back to the Yokohama Arena. On June 2, Conway defeated Satoshi Kojima in Las Vegas to regain the NWA World Heavyweight Championship. Conway and Dane returned to New Japan in November to take part in the 2014 World Tag League. The team finished second to last in their block with a record of three wins and four losses. Conway returned to NJPW on February 11, 2015, at The New Beginning in Osaka, where he and Chase Owens defeated Jyushin Thunder Liger and Hiroyoshi Tenzan in a tag team match. Three days later at The New Beginning in Sendai, Conway lost the NWA World Heavyweight Championship to Tenzan. Conway's profile has been removed from NJPW's official website.

==== Championship pursuits (2014–2017) ====
On February 22, 2014, Conway pinned Eric Draven in Madison, Indiana to win the NWA Supreme Heavyweight Championship. He would hold this title until May 9, 2014, when he was defeated by Draven in a rematch at Hanover College in Hanover, Indiana. On February 22, 2015, in Seymour Indiana Rob Conway defeated Eric Draven for the NWA Supreme Heavyweight Championship. On June 20, 2015, Conway defeated both Tim Storm and All That Alan Steele to become the NWA Mid-South Unified Heavyweight Champion.

On October 10, 2015, Conway was defeated by Greg Anthony in a double title match losing the NWA Mid-South Unified Heavyweight Championship. On December 4, 2015, Conway teamed with Matt Riviera teaming under the name The Iron Empire defeating The Heatseekers (Elliot Russell and Sigmon) to win the NWA World Tag Team Championships. On March 3, 2016, Rob Conway defeated Texas Outlaw to begin Conway's second reign as NWA Supreme Champion.

On September 9, 2016, The Iron Empire were defeated by The Heatseekers (Elliot Russell and Sigmon) losing the NWA World Tag Team Championships. The next day, on September 10, 2016, The Iron Empire regained to championship to become two time NWA World Tag Team Champions defeating The Heatseekers. They lost the title to Kazushi Miyamoto and Rob Terry in Tokyo, Japan on February 23, 2017. On May 12, 2017, Rob Conway defeated Josh Lewis (wrestler) to win his first NWA United States Championship in Hanover, Indiana at NWA Supreme Rebelution 2017. On May 27, 2017, Rob would lose the United States title to Josh Lewis in Madison Indiana.

On June 17, Rob Conway pinned Johnny Knockout in a 3 way Dance in West Harrison, Indiana. This victory made Conway the first ever "BOTB" Heavyweight Champion.

On July 14, Rob teamed up with Josh Lewis to win the NWA Mid-America Tag Team Championships from Custom Made (Eric Draven and Roger Malcolm) at NWA Supreme in Madison, Indiana. On August 18, 2017, Rob Conway and Josh Lewis lost the NWA Mid America tag team championship to Custom Made. When Eric Draven struck Josh Lewis with a chain.

=== Return to WWE (2018) ===
In September 2018, Conway started working at the WWE Performance Center as a guest trainer. His friendship with fellow OVW graduate Randy Orton helped get him the job.

=== Independent circuit (2017–present) ===
In 2020, he has wrestled significantly less than he has in past years. He has wrestled matches for AWA Supreme Wrestling and New Focus Wrestling.

== Personal life ==
Rob graduated from Indiana's New Albany High School in 1990 where he was a standout basketball player. He later played basketball at the now defunct Graceland College in New Albany. Following college, Rob sold fitness equipment and worked as a personal trainer in the Southern Indiana/Louisville area. He broke into wrestling after driving past the old Danny Davis arena in Jeffersonville, Indiana in 1997. After walking in and watching what he considered out of shape guys wrestle, he thought he would give it a try. Rob stated in a 2004 Indianapolis Monthly article that within five minutes of being in the ring, he knew this was what he wanted to do. Based on the appearance of the local wrestlers, he thought it would only take six months to make it to the WWE (then WWF); it eventually took him six years.

== Other media ==
Rob Conway appears as a playable character in WWE SmackDown! vs. Raw 2006.

== Championships and accomplishments ==
- All Star Wrestling
  - ASW Heavyweight Championship (1 time)
- Fortitude Wrestling Entertainment
  - FWE Tag Team Championship (1 time) – with Sylvian Grenier
- All Star Wrestling Alliance
  - AWA Central States Championship (3 times)
  - AWA United States Championship (1 time)
- Battle on the Border
  - BOTB Heavyweight Championship (1 time)
- Hoosier Pro Wrestling
  - HPW Tag Team Championship (1 time) – with TJ Kemp
- Indianapolis Championship Wrestling
  - ICW World Heavyweight Championship (1 time)
- Music City Wrestling
  - MCW North American Tag Team Championship (1 time) – with Nick Dinsmore
- Northern Championship Wrestling
  - NCW Tag Team Championship (1 time) – with Sylvain Grenier
- National Wrestling Alliance
  - NWA World Heavyweight Championship (2 times)
  - NWA World Tag Team Championship (4 times) – with Jax Dane (1) and Matt Riviera (3)
- NWA Mid-America
  - NWA Mid-America Tag Team Championship (1 time) – with Josh Lewis
- NWA Circle City Wrestling
  - NWA CCW Tag Team Championship (1 time) – with Sean Casey
- NWA Mid-South
  - NWA Mid-South Unified Heavyweight Championship (1 time)
- NWA Supreme Wrestling
  - NWA Supreme Heavyweight Championship (3 time)
  - NWA United States Championship (1 time)
  - NWA Tri-State Television Championship (1 time)
  - NWA Supreme Tag Team Championships (1 time) – with Josh Lewis
- New Focus Wrestling
  - NFW World Heavyweight championship (1 time)
  - NFW World Tag Team Championship (1 time) – with Josh Lewis
- Ohio Valley Wrestling
  - OVW Heavyweight Championship (5 times)
  - OVW Southern Tag Team Championship (11 times) – with Nick Dinsmore (10) and Pat Buck (1)
- Pro Wrestling Illustrated
  - Ranked No. 45 of the top 500 singles wrestlers in the PWI 500 in 2004
- Supreme Wrestling
  - Supreme Heavyweight Championship (2 times)
  - Supreme Central States Heavyweight Championship (1 time)
  - Supreme Mid America Heavyweight Championship (2 time, current)
- Top of the World Wrestling
  - TOW Tag Team Championship (1 time) – with Sylvain Grenier
- Universal Championship Wrestling
  - UCW Heavyweight Championship (1 time)
- World Wrestling Entertainment
  - World Tag Team Championship (3 times) – with Sylvain Grenier
- Wild Championship Wrestling Outlaws
  - WCWO Tag Team Championship (1 time) – with Josh Lewis
