= Tencozy =

Professional wrestling tag team

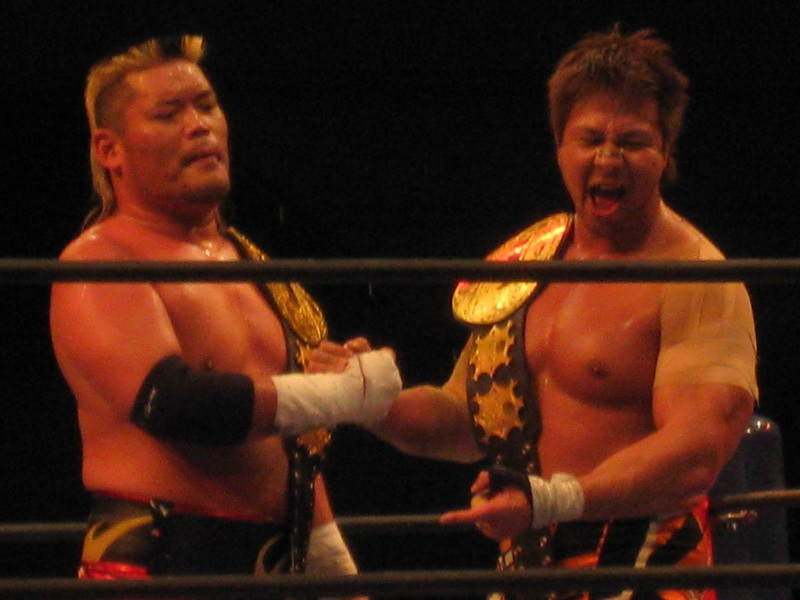
- Hiroyoshi Tenzan (left) and Satoshi Kojima (right) as the IWGP Tag Team Champions in February 2012

Tag team
- Members: Hiroyoshi Tenzan; Satoshi Kojima
- Name(s): Hiroyoshi Tenzan and Satoshi Kojima; Sekaiichi no Tag Team; Tencozy; Tencozy Keisatsu; Tencozy Police
- Billed heights: Tenzan: 1.83 m (6 ft 0 in); Kojima: 1.83 m (6 ft 0 in)
- Combined billed weight: 228 kg (503 lb)
- Debut: 1998
- Disbanded: 2026

Tencozy (Japanese: テンコジ, Hepburn: Tenkoji; occasionally spelled Ten-Koji) is a professional wrestling tag team that has competed in New Japan Pro-Wrestling and All Japan Pro Wrestling. Regarded as one of the greatest tag teams in New Japan history, They are seven-time tag team champions (six-time IWGP Tag Team Champions and one-time NWA World Tag Team Champions). In their history, Tencozy currently hold the third longest IWGP Tag Team Championship reign (430 days) and are currently the first and only team to have won both the G1 Tag League and World's Strongest Tag Determination League in general (2001, 2006 respectively) and in the same year (2008).

== History ==
=== First run (1999–2002) ===
Tencozy first began teaming up in 1998 after Tenzan's regular tag team partner Masahiro Chono was injured, and Keiji Mutoh recruited Kojima into nWo Japan. In their first shot, they defeated Genichiro Tenryu and Shiro Koshinaka at Wrestling World 1999 on January 4, 1999, to claim their first IWGP Tag Team Title. The team would make one successful title defense against Yuji Nagata and Manabu Nakanishi on February 5, 1999 before losing the titles to Koshinaka and Kensuke Sasaki on March 22, 1999.

Following the title loss, Tencozy largely spent most of 1999 representing nWo Japan against Masahiro Chono's new group: Team 2000. The feud eventually would end in January 2000 when Chono defeated Mutoh to dissolve nWo Japan once and for all and a few days later, Team 2000 had Tencozy joining them.

A few months later, Tencozy would defeat Yuji Nagata and Manabu Nakanishi on July 20, 2000, to win the Tag Team Championship for the second time. After winning the titles, Tencozy would have one of the most successful title reigns as they would hold the titles for a then record 430 Days (a record later broken by Cho-Ten who held the titles for 446). They would also make 6 successful title defenses also a then record (Cho-Ten also broke this record) fending off challenges from variations of Fighting Club G-EGGS (Yuji Nagata, Manabu Nakanishi, Brian Johnston and Yutaka Yoshie), fellow Team 2000 members: Chono and Tatsutoshi Goto, & BATT members: Taiyo Kea and Jinsei Shinzaki before eventually losing the titles on September 23, 2001, to Tatsumi Fujinami and Osamu Nishimura.

After the title loss, Tencozy began to show dissention with Chono and they finally split in October 2001, taking Hiro Saito, Tatsutoshi Goto, & Koji Kanemoto with them and splitting Team 2000. The team then entered the 2001 G1 Tag League, despite losing their first 3 matches, the team would eventually persevere and win the remainder of the tournament eventually defeating Mike Barton and Jim Steele to win the tournament and their first G1 Tag League.

=== Breakup (2002–2006) ===
In January 2002, Keiji Mutoh defected to All Japan Pro Wrestling and Kojima decided to follow with Tenzan deciding to remain in New Japan. Before leaving, Tencozy would wrestle one last match on January 24, 2002, where they defeated Kensuke Sasaki and Osamu Nishimura.

After breaking up, both Kojima and Tenzan would go on to success in their respective companies in both singles and tag divisions. One year after the breakup, Tencozy would reunite for one night as they defeated Chono and Nakanishi at Wrestling World 2003 on January 4, 2003. on February 20, 2005, Kojima and Tenzan would meet as opponents in a title vs. title match with Kojima defending the Triple Crown Heavyweight Championship and Tenzan defending the IWGP Heavyweight Championship. Kojima would win the match with 11 seconds left to win the IWGP Championship. The win made Kojima the first person to hold both titles simultaneously. The two would face each other again in a rematch at Nexess VI on May 14, 2005, with Tenzan regaining the IWGP Heavyweight Title.

=== Reunions (2006–2009, 2011–present) ===
In 2006, Tencozy would reunite and participate in All Japan's 2006 World's Strongest Tag Determination League. The team would make history eventually defeating Ro'Z and Suwama to win the tournament and became the first team in history to win both the G1 Tag League and the World's Strongest Tag Determination League. The team's next match would be a loss to their mentors: Masahiro Chono and Keiji Mutoh in the main event of Wrestle Kingdom in Tokyo Dome on January 4, 2007, after the loss Tencozy broke up again and returned to their companies.

In the summer of 2008, Tencozy would reunite again. First they defeated Togi Makabe and TARU at Pro Wrestling LOVE in Ryogoku Vol. 5 on August 31, 2008. Despite the win the team would see a setback as they failed to win the World Tag Team Championship from Taiyo Kea and Minoru Suzuki on October 11, 2008. In October, they entered the 2008 G1 Tag League, they would win their block, then defeated Manabu Nakanishi and Yutaka Yoshie in the semifinals, and then defeated Togi Makabe and Toru Yano to win their second G1 Tag League. In November, they entered the 2008 World's Strongest Tag Determination League and they would make history by winning their second World's Strongest Tag Determination League by defeating Suwama and Shuji Kondo. This win marked the first time a team won both tournaments in the same year.

On January 4, 2009, Tencozy were scheduled to take part in a 3 way for the IWGP Tag Titles against champions: Togi Makabe and Toru Yano and Team 3D, but the team was forced to pull out of the match due to Tenzan suffering an eye injury. Upon his return, Tencozy attempted a comeback as they took on Bad Intentions (Giant Bernard and Karl Anderson) in a #1 contendership match at Wrestling Dontaku 2009 on May 3, 2009, but they came up short. In August, Tenzan suffered an injury, which would sideline him for the next fifteen months.

Tencozy reunited on December 4, 2011, defeating the CHAOS tag team of Hideo Saito and Takashi Iizuka. On January 4, 2012, at Wrestle Kingdom VI in Tokyo Dome, Tencozy defeated Bad Intentions to win the IWGP Tag Team Championship for the third time. On May 3 at Wrestling Dontaku 2012, Tenzan and Kojima lost the title to Takashi Iizuka and Toru Yano in their third defense. On July 22, Tenzan and Kojima defeated Iizuka and Yano in a decision match to regain the newly vacated title. On October 8 at King of Pro-Wrestling, Tenzan and Kojima lost the title to K.E.S. (Davey Boy Smith, Jr. and Lance Archer). From November 20 to December 1, Tencozy took part in the round-robin portion of the 2012 World Tag League. The team finished with a record of four wins and two losses, winning their block and advancing to the semifinals of the tournament. On December 23, 2012, Tencozy made its debut for Dramatic Dream Team (DDT), teaming with Sanshiro Takagi in a three-on-four handicap match, where they defeated the Monster Army (Antonio Honda, Daisuke Sasaki, Hoshitango and Yuji Hino). On May 3, 2013, at Wrestling Dontaku 2013, Tencozy won the IWGP Tag Team Championship for the fifth time by winning a four-way match, which included defending champions K.E.S. as well as Takashi Iizuka and Toru Yano, and Manabu Nakanishi and Strong Man. They lost the title back to K.E.S. on November 9 at Power Struggle in a three-way match, which also included The IronGodz (Jax Dane and Rob Conway). In December, Tencozy made it to the finals of the 2013 World Tag League, defeating K.E.S. in the semifinals, before losing to Doc Gallows and Karl Anderson. On April 6, 2014, at Invasion Attack 2014, Tencozy defeated The IronGodz to win the NWA World Tag Team Championship. After four successful title defenses, they lost the title to K.E.S. on October 13 at King of Pro-Wrestling. The following month, Tencozy took part in the 2014 World Tag League, where they finished with a record of four wins and three losses, failing to advance to the finals.

On March 6, 2017, Tencozy defeated Tomohiro Ishii and Toru Yano to win the IWGP Tag Team Championship for the sixth time. They lost the title to War Machine (Hanson and Raymond Rowe) on April 9 at Sakura Genesis 2017. They attempted to regain the titles at Wrestling Dontaku 2017 in a 3-way tag team match also involving Guerrillas of Destiny (Tama Tonga & Tanga Loa), but came up short. Later that year, they took part in the 2017 World Tag League, finishing with three wins and four losses, failing to progress. The next year, Kojima would suffer an ACL injury, ruling him out for most of the year. The team reunited when Kojima recovered in September 2018, teaming with Yuji Nagata & Manabu Nakanishi to defeat Great Bash Heel (Togi Makabe & Tomoaki Honma) & FinJuice (Juice Robinson & David Finlay), after Kojima pinned Finlay.

== Championships and accomplishments ==
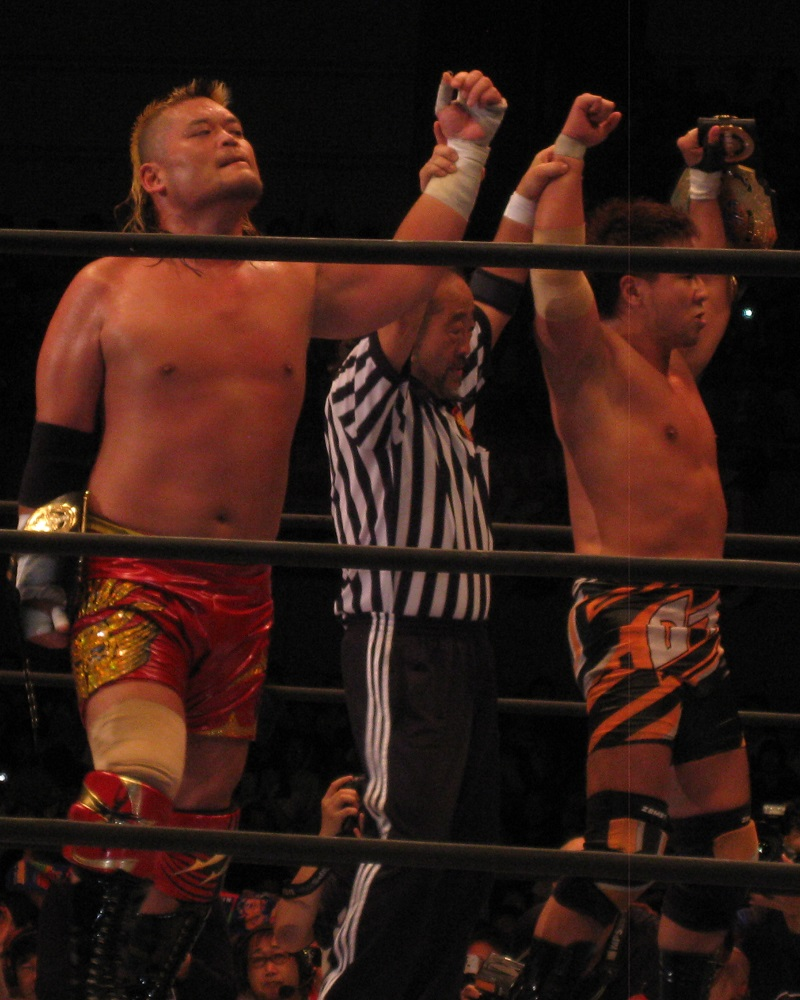
Tencozy as the NWA World Tag Team Champions in June 2014.

- All Japan Pro Wrestling
  - World's Strongest Tag Determination League (2006, 2008)
- National Wrestling Alliance
  - NWA World Tag Team Championship (1 time)
- New Japan Pro-Wrestling
  - IWGP Tag Team Championship (6 times)
  - G1 Tag League (2001, 2008)
  - Tag Team Best Bout (2000) vs. Manabu Nakanishi and Yuji Nagata on October 9
- Tokyo Sports
  - Tag Team of the Year (2000)
- Wrestling Observer Newsletter awards
  - Tag Team of the Year (2001)
