= Short Sleeve Sampson =

American professional wrestler (born 1973)

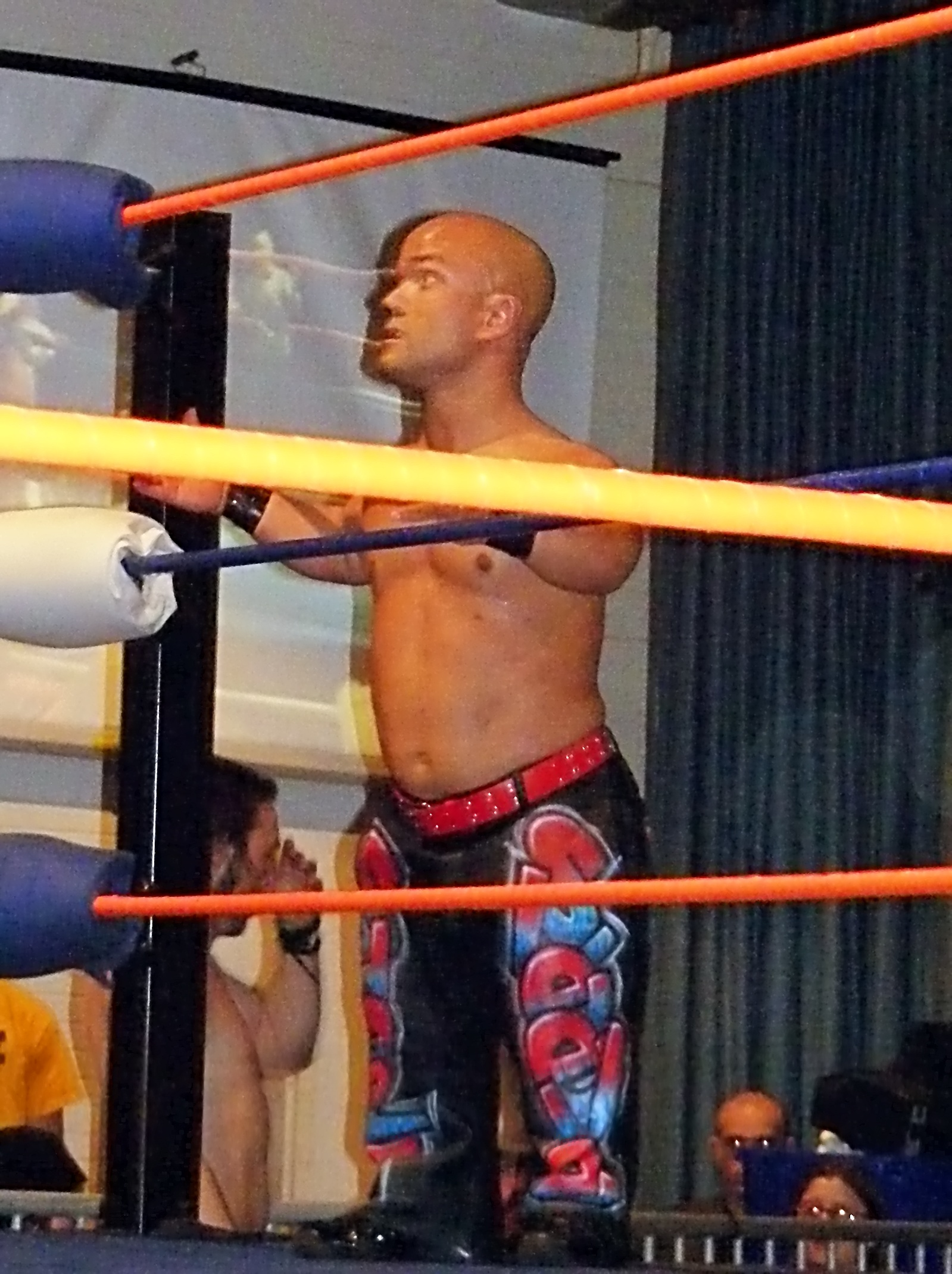

Personal information
- Born: Daniel DiLucchio; 1973 (age 52–53) Warwick, Rhode Island

Professional wrestling career
- Ring name(s): Jerry Smaller; Mini-Angle; Mini-Taker; Pocket Rocket; Short Sleeve Sampson; Short Sleeve Simpson
- Billed height: 4 ft 2 in (1.27 m)
- Billed weight: 120 lb (54 kg)
- Trained by: Ali Muhamad; Kyle Storm
- Debut: 1999

Daniel DiLucchio (born 1973) is an American Midget professional wrestler best known by his ring name Short Sleeve Sampson. Sampson works on the independent circuit, mainly for Micro Championship Wrestling, TNT Pro Wrestling, and Midget Wrestling Warriors. He has also occasionally made appearances with Total Nonstop Action Wrestling and World Wrestling Entertainment.

== Professional wrestling career ==
=== World Wrestling Entertainment ===
DiLucchio appeared in World Wrestling Entertainment (WWE) in promos on two occasions as miniature versions of larger wrestlers. In 2003, he appeared as Mini-Angle, performing a Kurt Angle-style ankle lock on Angle, who was posing as John Cena. The following year, he appeared as Mini-Taker and was about to be tombstoned by JBL before then being attacked by the real Undertaker.

Outside of the comic promos, DiLucchio competed in SmackDown!'s Juniors Division in 2005, participating in the first ever Juniors match against Pitbull Patterson. He also made an appearance on Raw as Pocket Rocket, the one night only tag team partner for The Heart Throbs in a match against Viscera and his mini version partner. Also in the WWE, he appeared as a member of D-Generation X's mini version of the Spirit Squad. In 2014 DiLucchio returned to WWE at Extreme Rules to announce for the weeLC match with Hornswoggle vs El Torito as "Jerry Smaller", a parody of Jerry "The King" Lawler.

=== Total Nonstop Action Wrestling ===
Sampson appeared at Total Nonstop Action Wrestling (TNA)'s 2006 Bound for Glory pay-per-view, competing in Kevin Nash's X Division Invitational. The following year, he returned to TNA in a segment where he portrayed Chris Sabin.

=== Micro Championship Wrestling and independent circuit ===
Sampson also stars on the TruTV original series Hulk Hogan's Micro Championship Wrestling.

Sampson is also employed by the Micro Wrestling Federation, where he has held the MCW Championship one time. In the company, he also appears as a fan favorite. He has previously appeared for National Wrestling Superstars, Ward Family Entertainment, Pro Wrestling Mid Atlantic, and Awesome Wrestling Entertainment, High Impact Wrestling, All Star Wrestling, Old School Wrestling, Big Time Wrestling.

=== Retirement ===
In August 2013, Sampson announced his decision to retire from pro wrestling. He would embark on a 40 stop "It's Midget Time" farewell tour. On night three of the High Impact Wrestling Canada's "Christmas Rampage Tour" at King's Challenge IV, Sampson was inducted into the HIW Hall of Fame. But in 2015, he postponed his retirement as he started Midget Wrestling Warriors.

== Personal life ==
DiLucchio is married and has a daughter.

== Championships and accomplishments ==
- Cauliflower Alley Club
  - Men's Wrestling Award (2014)
- Chaotic Wrestling
  - CW Midget Championship (1 time)
  - CW Light Heavyweight Championship (1 time)
- High Impact Wrestling Canada
  - Hall of Fame (2013)
- Micro Championship Wrestling
  - MCW World Heavyweight Championship (1 time, current)
- Micro Wrestling Federation
  - MWF Championship (1 time)
- Midge Wrestling Warriors
  - MWW Champion (1 time, first)
- New England Pro Wrestling Hall of Fame
  - Class of 2015
- Wisconsin Organized Wrestling
  - WOW Midget Championship (1 time)
