= NWA Wildside United States Heavyweight Championship =

Professional wrestling championship

Details
- Promotion: NWA Wildside
- Date established: June 9, 1995
- Date retired: March 2005

Other name(s)
- NCW United States Heavyweight Championship
Statistics
- First champion(s): Curtis Thompson
- Final champion(s): Rainman
- Most reigns: Jesse Taylor (3 reigns)

The NWA Wildside United States Heavyweight Championship was a title contested for in the National Wrestling Alliance-member promotion NWA Wildside.

The title was originally the NCW United States Heavyweight Championship from 1995 through 1999, when National Championship Wrestling became NWA Wildside. The championship lasted through November 2000 when it was unified with the NWA National Heavyweight Championship. Wildside revived the title in February 2004 and it remained until the promotion closed in April 2005.

== Title history ==
Silver areas in the history indicate periods of unknown lineage.

Wrestler:	Times:	Date:	Location:	Notes:
NCW United States Heavyweight Championship
Curtis Thompson	1	June 9, 1995	Sylva, North Carolina	Defeated Sam McGraw to become the first champion.
Shane Austin	1	December 1998		
Eddie Golden	1	December 19, 1998	Cornelia, Georgia	Defeated Austin and David Jericho in a three-way match.
Jesse Taylor	1	March 1999		
Romeo Bliss	1	June 1999		
Jesse Taylor	2	July 3, 1999	Cornelia, Georgia	
Romeo Bliss	2	October 30, 1999	Cornelia, Georgia	Title renamed NWA Wildside United States Heavyweight Championship on December 12, 1999.
NWA Wildside United States Heavyweight Championship
Terry Knight	1	January 11, 2000	Cornelia, Georgia	
Jesse Taylor	3	September 3, 2000	Toccoa, Georgia	
Terry Knight	2	November 18, 2000	Cornelia, Georgia	
Title retired		November 18, 2000	Cornelia, Georgia	Title unified with NWA National Heavyweight Championship.
NWA Wildside United States Heavyweight Championship
Todd Sexton	1	January 2004	Cornelia, Georgia	Title awarded
Rick Michaels	1	February 13, 2004	Cornelia, Georgia	Steel Cage Match.
Jason Blackmon	1	March 5, 2004	Cornelia, Georgia	
Rick Michaels	2	March 26, 2004	Cornelia, Georgia	
Adam Roberts	1	July 9, 2004	Cornelia, Georgia	
Skeeter Frost	1	September 10, 2004	Cornelia, Georgia	Won in a 3-Way Dance against Adam Roberts & Billy Buck.
Brent Silver	1	December 2004	Cornelia, Georgia	
Jay Fury	1	February 2005	Cornelia, Georgia	
Brent Silver	2	February 2005	Cornelia, Georgia	
Rainman	1	March 2005	Cornelia, Georgia	Title unification match with the NWA Wildside Heavyweight Championship also at stake. NWA Wildside U.S. Title retired.

== See also ==
- NWA Wildside
