= Matt Duffield =

American professional wrestler and politician

Matt Riviera
Personal information
- Born: Matthew Duffield; May 18, 1983 (age 43) Russellville, Arkansas, U.S.

Professional wrestling career
- Ring name: Matt Riviera
- Billed height: 6 ft 2 in (1.88 m)
- Billed weight: 269 lb (122 kg)
- Billed from: Hollywood, California; Russellville, Arkansas
- Trained by: Bill Ash; David Taylor "Nature Boy" Buddy Landell
- Debut: 2001

Matt Duffield

Member of the Arkansas House of Representatives from the 53rd district
- Incumbent
- Assumed office January 9, 2023

Personal details
- Party: Republican
- Education: Harding University

Matt Duffield (born May 18, 1983), also known as Matt Riviera (wrestling ring name), is an American politician and retired professional wrestler. He is formerly one half of the NWA World Tag Team Champions with Rob Conway as the tag team The Iron Empire. He also has promoted wrestling events. In addition to the wrestling business, he has also appeared in movies and television shows. He currently serves as a Republican member for the 53rd district of the Arkansas House of Representatives.

== Early life ==
Matt Riviera was born on May 18, 1983, in Russellville, Arkansas. At the age of 12 after coming across a television program, WCW Worldwide, Matt began his love for professional wrestling after watching Dick Slater wrestle. Pro wrestling's blend of physicality and theatrics appealed to him and he soon became passionate about professional wrestling. After being told at the age of 15 that he was too young to legally being training as a professional wrestler, Riviera began doing everything he could to get his foot in the door of the wrestling business such as creating wrestling programs. This included writing articles and taking photographs. He also began his first foray into promoting professional wrestling events at the age of 17 after meeting his mentor, wrestling trainer and promoter Bill Ash. He began promoting wrestling events under the name of Global Pro Wrestling. Once he finally began to train to become a Professional wrestler, he discovered that the physicality it takes to be a pro wrestler might be too much for him. He quit wrestling school on three occasions. However, at age 21, Riviera stuck with wrestling as he trained for six months as well as attended wrestling school for four months. Matt Riviera also obtained a college degree in broadcast journalism, graduating from Harding University out of Searcy, Arkansas in 2006.

== Professional wrestling career ==
Matt Riviera had his first professional wrestling match in 2001 for the Arkansas Association of Wrestling by teaming with Running Wolf to take on the team of Frank Thornton and "Big" Wes Jones. Matt would go on to wrestle for various promotions throughout Arkansas and expanded to many other states and promotions. While wrestling, he was still involved in promoting wrestling events, as well as beginning college. Riviera promoted Global Pro Wrestling, which after a name change, became Traditional Championship Wrestling. Traditional Championship Wrestling was able to secure a national cable deal in 2013 with Cox Sports Television that would allow people all over the country to see Riviera and other TCW stars perform weekly. After TCW folded in 2014, Matt would then move on to focus more on his own in-ring career.

In 2005, Matt Riviera won his first professional wrestling championship while competing for Arkansas Wrestling Entertainment (AWE) by winning the AWE International Heavyweight Championship. He won this title by winning a tournament, last defeating Frank Thornton.

In 2009, Matt Riviera further solidified his status as one of Arkansas' premier athletes when he won the Pro Wrestling Arkansas Heavyweight Championship. He would also go on to win the PWA Tag Team Championship the same year, with his partner Johnny Morton.

TCW is the promotion where Matt Riviera has wrestled, as well as promoted. Started as Global Pro Wrestling, it was renamed as Traditional Championship Wrestling in 2009. As a promoter, Riviera took a local wrestling show and expanded it to an hour long show that was available to watch throughout the United States. As a wrestler, Riviera has won the TCW Heavyweight Championship as well as multiple tag team championships with various partners such as Jeff Jett, as Reckage & Romance; with Tim Storm as the Natural State Connection; with Greg Anthony as The Empire; and with Jerry Lawler. However, as TCW folded, Riviera began to focus more on his in-ring career and less on promoting.

=== National Wrestling Alliance ===
==== Championship success ====
Matt Riviera has wrestled in multiple National Wrestling Alliance promotions including NWA Mid South, NWA IHWE-Texas (Iconic Heroes of Wrestling Excellence), NWA Lonestar, and NWA Universal. While wrestling for these NWA promotions, Riviera has also won several regional championships such as the IHWE Heavyweight championship, NWA Lonestar Tag Team championships with partner Greg Anthony, and twice holding the Western States Heritage title. He is also the current NWA Mid South Unified champion, a championship that was unified with the TCW Heavyweight title when Traditional Championship Wrestling folded in 2014.

==== The Iron Empire ====
In 2015, Matt Riviera decided to team up with former WWE star as well as 2 time National Wrestling Alliance World Heavyweight Champion Rob Conway. The two would become known as "The Iron Empire" after Rob's moniker, "The Ironman" and The Empire, a stable of wrestlers led by Matt Riviera. On December 4, 2015, The Iron Empire captured the coveted NWA World Tag Team Championships from The Heatseakers at an NWA Mid South event in Robinsonville, Mississippi. The team would go on to face the top teams in the NWA.

Matt Riviera debuted for Diamond Stars Wrestling on September 25. In the main event, he along with Iron Empire tag team partner Rob Conway, successfully defended the NWA World Tag Team Championship in a two out of three falls match against Rob Terry and Masakatsu Funaki. In the first fall, Conway pinned Funaki under a mask after hitting The Erotic City (Chokeslam/Belly to back suplex combo). In the second fall, Conway submitted to Funaki via a rear naked choke. In the third fall, Riviera was disqualified after hitting Terry with a chair.

The Iron Empire lost the NWA World Tag Team Championship to Kazushi Miyamoto and Rob Terry in Tokyo, Japan on February 23, 2017.

==== Feud With Jerry "The King" Lawler ====
On September 16, 2017, at CWA WrestleRaise III in Hot Springs, Arkansas, Matt Riviera interfered in the NWA Worlds Heavyweight Title match between NWA Worlds Heavyweight champion, Tim Storm and Jerry Lawler, subduing Lawler with an ether rag, and allowing Storm to pin Lawler to retain the title.

Matt Riviera and Jerry Lawler would face off in a match on May 17, 2018, at CWA WrestleRaise V in Hot Springs, Arkansas, with the stipulation that if Lawler lost, he would kiss Riviera's foot and if Riviera lost, Lawler would get 5 minutes in the ring with Riviera's manager, Boyd Bradford. Lawler's son, Brian "Christopher" Lawler would be in his corner. The match ended in DQ after Lawler shot a fireball in Riviera's face, causing Riviera to have to be rushed out of the arena before Lawler could kiss Riviera's foot.

Their next encounter would be at MSW: Legends of Wrestling on June 23, in Harrison, Arkansas. With referee James Beard down, Riviera would hit Lawler with an object and pin Lawler. After the bell, James Beard discovered the object & reversed the decision in favor of Lawler.

At a USA Championship Wrestling event in Jackson, Tennessee on July 7, Matt Riviera and Boyd Bradford would present "Superstar" Bill Dundee with a briefcase containing $100,000 if Dundee would agree to retire from wrestling. Dundee would accept the metal briefcase & then nail Riviera & Bradford with it before taking off with the money. On the July 14 episode of USA Championship Wrestling, Dundee would appear for an interview with the briefcase, before being confronted by Riviera. Jerry Lawler came to the aide of Dundee. Lawler and Dundee would attack Riviera before cutting Riviera's prized perm in the middle of the ring. This would lead to a televised match the next week on July 21 between Riviera and Lawler, which ended in a No Contest after interference from Dundee & "Dangerous" Doug Gilbert.

On January 5, 2019, at a USA Championship Wrestling event in Jackson, Tennessee, during a match between Lawler and "Wildfire" Tommy Rich, with the referee down & Lawler covering Rich, Riviera slid in the ring wearing a referee shirt, counted to 2 & stopped. Riviera then attacked Lawler, rolled Rich on top of Lawler and made the 3 count.

Riviera and Lawler would next meet on February 16 at USA Championship Wrestling's Thunderdome event in Jackson, TN in a Thunderdome Cage Match. The match would see Jerry Lawler unintentionally throw a fireball into the face of one referee & Riviera pile drive another referee. "Wildfire" Tommy Rich, wearing a referee shirt attempted to take the key from outside official, Jerry Calhoun, before being stopped by "Dangerous" Doug Gilbert. Jerry Calhoun would eventually unlock the cage door & count the pin for Lawler.

On March 9 at USA Championship Wrestling's "Hot Stuff" Eddie Gilbert Tribute Event in Jackson, Tennessee, a "Falls Count Anywhere in Madison County Match" took place, as Jerry Lawler and Doug Gilbert faced off against Matt Riviera & Tommy Rich. The match ended in a pinfall victory for Lawler & Gilbert after Gilbert pinned Tommy Rich.

On October 12 at CWA Lloyd's Rumble in Hot Springs, Arkansas, Matt Riviera would become the CWA's 1st Arkansas Heavyweight champion, winning the "Lloyd's Rumble Battle Royal" by last eliminating Tim Storm. Riviera had also picked up a victory in a match against Buff Bagwell, earlier in the evening, after Arn Anderson interfered in the match by delivering a Spinebuster to Bagwell, allowing Riviera to get the pin fall.

On January 18, 2020, at CWA No Surrender in North Little Rock, Arkansas, Matt Riviera put his newly won Arkansas Heavyweight Title on the line against Jerry Lawler's career in a "Title vs. Career Match". Lawler would pick up the pin fall victory after throwing a massive fireball in Riviera's face, making Lawler the new Arkansas Heavyweight champion.

At the Jerry Lawler 50th Anniversary Celebration at The Ballpark in Jackson, Tennessee on September 26, Jerry Lawler & The Rock N' Roll Express (w/ Jimmy Hart) faced Matt Riviera, "Wildfire" Tommy Rich, & "Dangerous" Doug Gilbert (w/ Ron Ratcatcher) in a Thunderdome Cage Match. Lawler would pin Riviera for the victory after hitting Riviera with Jimmy Hart's megaphone. Musical icon Kid Rock and golfer John Daly (golfer) were in attendance for the event.

Also during this period, Riviera was involved in angles & matches with Buff Bagwell, Bob Holly, Tony Atlas, & Tim Storm as well as various other wrestlers on the independent wrestling circuit.

==== Sheriff Buford Pusser Memorial Cup ====
On May 24, 2018, at the 30th Annual Sheriff Buford Pusser Festival in Adamsville, Tennessee, Matt Riviera won the 1st Annual Sheriff Buford Pusser Memorial Cup, presented by Bert Prentice's USA Championship Wrestling, in a battle royal by last eliminating "Superstar" Bill Dundee.

==== Retirement ====
On January 1, 2021, Matt Riviera officially announced his retirement from professional wrestling. Riviera stated in a press release:

"I seriously appreciate the support that I have received for the duration of my time as an active talent and promoter in pro wrestling. It is time to open a new chapter in my life by closing this one. I wish everyone the best."

=== AMP Article ===
Duffield's career journey from pro wrestling to politics was featured in an article in the January 2024 edition of Arkansas Money & Politics magazine entitled, "Russellville Representative Brings Unique Style to Statehouse".

== Other media ==
=== Movies ===
Besides professional wrestling, Matt Riviera has the passion for acting as well. He got his first chance to be featured in a movie in the 2009 thriller, Blood Forest. Riviera played a deputy in the film. In 2010, Riviera had a role in the drama, Step Away from the Stone. His latest appearance in a movie was in the 2011 thriller, Happy Hour.

=== Reality television ===
It was after VH1 producers saw Matt Riviera's acting in Happy Hour, as well as his in-ring career that they invited him to become a participant on a new reality show, Megan Wants a Millionaire. The show's premise was that reality show contestant, Megan Hauserman would eliminate contestants, one by one until she chose the winner, whom she would marry. Matt Riviera was on the show as his net worth was 5.5 million dollars. The show would only go on to air three episodes due to controversy surrounding one of the contestants. Riviera would appear in all three aired episodes. In 2013, he would appear on the Bravo TV network show Millionaire Matchmaker, Season 6 appearing in the episode titled, The Dancer and the Wrestler.

=== Podcast ===
On August 31, 2017, Matt Riviera launched "The Matt Riviera Show" Podcast.

==== Dave Palumbo WWE Wellness Policy Controversy ====
Episode 5 of The Matt Riviera Show featured an interview with former bodybuilder, Dave Palumbo. Palumbo is a noted "nutritionist" to such WWE performers as Steve Austin, Triple H & Stephanie McMahon.

During the interview, Riviera asked Palumbo repeatedly about the types of "supplements" that Triple H was taking, inferring that Triple H may have been using steroids. Palumbo vehemently denied that Triple H was taking steroids, because it would be a violation of WWE's Wellness Policy and went on to say that he was sure that Triple H would "love to" take steroids. However, Palumbo went on to state that WWE wrestlers were allowed to take growth hormones, such as HGH, which are banned substances in all professional sports in the United States.

Palumbo Quote-

"But the good thing about wrestling is it's not a professional sport per se, more entertainment, they are allowed to take hormone replacement. So they can go to HRT places, they can get testosterone, you know, 100 milligrams a week, whatever they prescribe nowadays, umm, they can get hCG, they can do, you know, hGH if they want. Those are acceptable, you know, and a lot of the wrestlers do do it, y'know, it's not for me to say who's using what, but they're very minimal doses."

This quote would cause the WWE to release a press statement attempting to clarify their Wellness Policy guidelines on growth hormone use:

"WWE's comprehensive Talent Wellness Policy, which is administered by an independent, third-party, clearly states hGH and hCG are among a long list of banned substances, however, due to certain medical conditions, there are a variety of therapeutic exemptions that account for approximately 7% of our contracted talent."

The story was picked up by numerous websites, including Forbes.com, Deadspin.com, & BleacherReport.com

=== Bobo Brazil Walk of Fame Induction ===
In May 2023, Duffield inducted fellow pro wrestler and Arkansan, Bobo Brazil into the Arkansas Walk of Fame.

=== Arkansas Traveler Award ===
In 2023, Duffield presented several famous musicians with the Arkansas Traveler Award, including Larry Dodson of the Bar-Kays, thrash metal band Exodus, and R&B icon Morris Day.

In April 2024, Duffield presented WWE Hall of Fame wrestler and legendary pro wrestling promoter, "Cowboy" Bill Watts with the Arkansas Traveler Award at Watt's home in Hollister, Missouri.

In November 2024, Duffield presented the Arkansas Traveler Award to iconic pro wrestler, Hulk Hogan.

== Music ==
On February 14, 2018, Matt Riviera made his hip hop music debut, releasing the song and music video for "Best Meat's in the Rump (Juicy)", a collaboration with DJ Mr. Mixx of controversial rap group, 2 Live Crew, & pro wrestling manager, Boyd Bradford. The song was released for iTunes, Google Play, Amazon, and multiple other music streaming services. The song features shout outs to WWE women wrestlers Ronda Rousey, Nikki Bella, Alexa Bliss, and Nia Jax.

=== Weight Lifting ===
Riviera is an avid gym goer boasting a bench press of 445 lbs. for 1 rep, 225 lbs. for 40 reps, and 380 lbs. for 3 reps in 2022. His best recorded deadlift is 520 lbs. His coach is Warren Martin owner of Sync Fitness in Conway, AR.

== Politics ==
In 2022, Duffield defeated Doug Skelton and David J. Howell in the Republican primary election for the 53rd district of the Arkansas House of Representatives. No candidate was nominated to challenge him in the general election. He assumed office in 2023.

As a freshman, Duffield sponsored various pieces of legislation which were signed into law, including the creation of a state sales tax exemption for the Disabled American Veterans organization, and an act to clarify the definition of a "Loaded Firearm" for the purpose of the state statute concerning the possession and use of a weapon.

On March 27, 2023, the Arkansas House passed a Duffield sponsored resolution to proclaim "The Right to Keep and Bear Arms Day" in the state of Arkansas.

On November 5, 2024, Duffield was re-elected to a 2nd term as State Representative for House District 53, defeating his Democrat challenger, Amie Gates, in the 2024 general election, earning 73.4% of the vote.

Duffield was featured in an article in the December 2024 issue of Arkansas Money & Politics magazine, which focused on the prospects of unity and bipartisanship amongst Arkansas legislators during the regular legislative session of the incoming 95th General Assembly.

"In my district, I was elected to represent and, in turn, work for 30,000 Arkansans. I do my best to communicate with everyone regardless of party affiliation. I try my best to get along with everybody, and as long as they are standing for the true wishes of their respective districts, I can understand and respect how they choose to vote," Duffield said in the article.

=== Arkansas FOIA Controversy ===
In September 2023, during a special legislative session, Duffield joined a bi-partisan majority of the Arkansas House in voting down efforts by Gov. Sarah Sanders to rush the passing of a controversial bill to massively overhaul the state's FOIA laws through the legislative process. Duffield said in a statement, "The House sent a clear message that in the absence of legislative hearings on major pieces of legislation we are, at a minimum, going to have a discussion about these bills in committee. That is what we are paid to do and it is an obligation we take seriously. We also have constituents who expect us to do our due diligence, and we've now said loud and clear we intend to." A scaled down version of the FOIA bill, limited to the Governor's security detail, would later pass during the special session.

=== Fundraising ===
The Arkansas Democrat Gazette reported in December 2023 that Duffield had raised $152,780.99 in campaign contributions through November and reported a balance of $157,992.41 on November 30, making him the top fundraiser in the Arkansas House for the year.

=== Crypto Mines ===
In December 2023, Duffield sent a letter to Gov. Sanders requesting a special session of the Arkansas Legislature for the purpose of repealing the recent Arkansas Data Centers Act of 2023, which limited the ability of local governments to regulate crypto mines. In the letter, Duffield cited environmental concerns, as well as the fact that many of the crypto mining companies operating in Arkansas had strong ties to the Chinese Communist Party. In an interview with KATV, Duffield said of his call for the repeal, "I hope that the governor's office reviews the letter that I respectfully sent to them and they will see the many negative potential consequences these facilities could have – not just in our district here in Russellville, but statewide – could be numerous. And I think we need to step in and repeal that legislation."

In May 2024, Duffield helped pass Senate Bill 79, which prohibits ownership of crypto mines in Arkansas by "prohibited foreign parties" and requires that all crypto mining operations receive a permit through the Oil and Gas Commission. The legislation was signed into law by Gov. Sanders on May 2.

=== Petition for FOIA Ballot Initiative ===
In March 2024, Duffield was the first Arkansas legislator to publicly sign and support petitions to place two proposed amendments on the November general election ballot that would seek to strengthen and enshrine Arkansas' Freedom of Information laws into the state constitution.

=== Malinowski Press Conference ===
On April 18, 2024, one month after a pre-dawn ATF raid on the West Little Rock home of Clinton National Airport Executive Director Bryan Malinowski ended in Malinowski's death, Duffield, joined by more than a dozen state legislators, led a press conference at the State Capitol to demand answers from the ATF about the incident.

"Did they knock? If they didn't, why? Did they clearly state who they were before they crashed through his door that morning? If not, why? Were they wearing the required body cameras? If not, why not, and where the hell is the footage," Duffield asked during the press conference.

The following day, US Senator Tom Cotton announced that the Bureau of Alcohol, Tobacco, Firearms and Explosives had informed him that the agents involved in the Malinowski incident were not wearing their required body cameras during the raid. This would lead to a public inquiry by the US House Judiciary Committee in May 2024.

=== Special Session: 2024 ===
During a June special session of the State Legislature, Duffield co-sponsored the "Homestead Act", raising Arkansas' homestead tax credit from $425 to $500. Duffield also supported legislation to reduce the state's top individual tax rate from 4.4% to 3.9% and to reduce the top corporate tax rate from 4.8% to 4.3%. These bills were signed into law by Gov. Sanders on June 19.

=== Legislation on Water Fluoridation ===
In November 2024, Duffield was the primary sponsor of a pair of bills filed in the State Senate, Senate Bill 2 and Senate Bill 4, both concerning the elimination of Arkansas' laws requiring the mandatory fluoridation of the state's drinking water. The story was picked up by several media outlets, including Newsweek.

"As a society, I believe people need to be more aware of what they are putting in their bodies and our water supply needs to be part of these considerations," Duffield stated in an article for the Arkansas Advocate.

Legislation of Water Fluoride Continued

Senate bill 2 failed by 1 vote in the senate public health committee. 5 votes are needed to pass the 8-member committee.

=== Fireworks Sales ===
In February 2025, Duffield championed HB1324, which became Act 108. The bill permits firework vendors more time to sale their products in the summer. The new on-sale date of June 13 increases the sale date by 7 days.

"I don't see any cons to this bill, in my opinion, only pros, for each of your districts as well," said Duffield in committee.

=== Legislation Protecting Children ===
In February 2025, Duffield was the lead sponsor of legislation that prevents registered sex offenders that are level 4 and 5 from going within 100 feet of water parks, swimming areas, and children's playgrounds of public parks.

=== The Individual Right to Keep and Bear Arms Constitutional Amendment Proposal ===
In April 2025, Duffield was the lead house sponsor on SJR1, which with 60 co-sponsors, passed unanimously and will appear on the 2026 November ballot. If passed, it will embed the individual right to keep in bear arms and accessories in the Arkansas state constitution.

"At the end of the day, the Second Amendment and our own right to keep and bear arms in the Arkansas Constitution is not about hunting, it's not about sport-shooting and it's not about self-protection," Duffield said. "It's about a citizen's last line of defense against tyranny, and it's part of our nation's DNA."[55]

=== The Dog and Cat Rescue Act ===
In April 2025, Duffield sponsored Daisy's Law, allowing law enforcement to temporarily secure abused dogs and cats so they can be transported to local animal shelters. The law was named after Duffield's rescue dog chihuahua Daisy that passed away.

=== Black History Month Honorees ===
Duffield honored African Americans blues singer Bobby Rush, DJ Broadway Joe, and basketball player Sidney Moncrief in the 2025 legislative session.

=== Most Conservative Arkansas House Member Honor ===
Duffield was named the most conservative member of the Arkansas House of Representatives by Arkansas 1st News.

=== AY Magazine Honor ===
Duffield was honored as a Man of Distinction in the July 2025 addition of About You magazine.

=== Prayer Vigil for Abused Children ===
In July 2025, Duffield hosted a prayer vigil with local advocate Carissa O'Bryant on the courthouse steps of Pope County to pray for 3 abused children from the area that were mistreated and tortured by their biological parents.

=== From Wrestling Heel to State Rep ===
On September 25, 2025, acclaimed journalist Steve Brauner wrote on article featuring Duffield’s transition from pro wrestling to politics. Duffield was quoted about running for office:

“The opportunity was there, and it sounds cliche, but I said, ‘You know, I really want to see if I can help people" Duffield said. “That’s really the bottom line of why I ran, and we ran a campaign. Two of my best friends who are wrestling promoters came to town. They helped me knock on doors. And once the dust settled, we’d won, and here I am about to file for my third term.”

=== Champion of Support for Suicide Month ===
Duffield called attention to National Suicide Prevention Month highlighting the urgent need for community-wide action to address a crisis that claims one Arkansas life every 14 hours.

“In 2023, we lost 615 lives to suicide-615 families forever changed, 615 futures cut short, and 615 reminders that mental health crises can touch anyone, anywhere, at any time”.

=== Uniting for Elders in their Golden Years ===
On December 19, 2025, Arkansas Money & Politics magazine interviewed Duffield for an article highlighting the struggles of senior citizens in Arkansas.

“We’ve got to get back,” Duffield said. “We’ve got to get back to the basics of just general human care and humanity and taking care of each other.”

=== 2nd Amendment State Ballot Initiative ===
As the lead sponsor of what would become known as Issue 2, Duffield once again proved his commitment to protecting the right to keep and bear arms. Issue 2 passed statewide by 70.80% on November, 3, 2026. The Right to Keep and Bear Arms Amendment changed the state Constitution to “provide a right to possess and use ammunition, firearm accessories, and firearm components without limitation. It also added language that the right to keep and bear arms is a “natural, fundamental, and individual right that shall not be infringed.”

=== Elected to a Third Term ===
Duffield was re-elected to the Arkansas House of Representatives on November 3, 2026 beating opponent Jennifer Lewter by 61%.

== Championships and accomplishments ==
- Arkansas Wrestling Entertainment
  - AWE International Heavyweight Championship (1 time)
- Championship Wrestling Of Arkansas
  - CWA Arkansas Heavyweight Championship (1 time, inaugural)
  - Lloyd's Rumble Battle Royal (2019)
- Cauliflower Alley Club
  - Men's Wrestling Award (2013)
- Insane Hardcore Wrestling Excellence
  - IHWE Heavyweight Championship (1 time)
- National Wrestling Alliance
  - NWA World Tag Team Championship (3 times) – with Rob Conway
- NWA Elite Championship Wrestling
  - NWA ECW Tag Team Championship (2 times) – with Greg Anthony (1) and Tim Storm (1)
- NWA Lonestar
  - NWA Lonestar Tag Team Championships (2 times) – with Greg Anthony
- NWA Mid South
  - NWA Mid-South Unified Heavyweight Championship (1 time)
  - NWA Western States Heritage Championship (2 times)
- Pro Wrestling Arkansas
  - PWA Heavyweight Championship (1 time)
  - PWA Tag Team Championship (1 time) – with Johnny Morton
- Pro Wrestling Illustrated
  - Ranked No. 146 of the top 500 singles wrestlers in the PWI 500 in 2016
- Traditional Championship Wrestling
  - TCW Heavyweight Championship (1 time)
  - TCW Tag Team Championship (5 times) – with Jeff Jett, Tim Storm, Greg Anthony, and Jerry Lawler
- USA Championship Wrestling
  - 1st Annual Buford Pusser Memorial Cup Championship (1 time)
