= Chaotic Wrestling Light Heavyweight Championship =

Professional wrestling championship

Details
- Promotion: Chaotic Wrestling
- Date established: April 21, 2001
- Date retired: February 16, 2002
Statistics
- First champion: Short Sleeve Sampson
- Final champion: Dukes Dalton
- Longest reign: Arch Kincaid (203 days)
- Shortest reign: Skunk O'Mally (<1 day)

The Chaotic Wrestling (CW) Light Heavyweight Championship was a professional wrestling title in American independent promotion Chaotic Wrestling. The title was first won by Short Sleeve Sampson in Andover, Massachusetts on April 21, 2001. There have been a total of 4 recognized individual champions, who have had a combined 4 official reigns. On February 16, 2002, after being unified with the CW Television Championship, Dukes Dalton retires both titles after winning the New England Championship.

== Title history ==
Key
No.	Overall reign number
Reign	Reign number for the specific champion
Days	Number of days held

No.	Champion	Championship change			Reign statistics		Notes	Ref.
No.	Champion	Date	Event	Location	Reign	Days	Notes	Ref.
1	Short Sleeve Sampson	April 21, 2001	N/A	Andover, Massachusetts	1	34	Awarded the title.	
2	Skunk O'Mally	May 25, 2001	N/A	Lawrence, Massachusetts	1	<1		
3	Arch Kincaid	May 25, 2001	N/A	Lawrence, Massachusetts	1	203		
4	Dukes Dalton	December 14, 2001	N/A	Lawrence, Massachusetts	1	64		
—	Unified	February 16, 2002	—	Lawrence, Massachusetts	—	—	Defeated R. J. Brewer to unify the title with the Television Championship and immediately both titles are retired after Dalton wins the New England Championship.	
