= Rick Michaels =

American professional wrestler (born 1974)

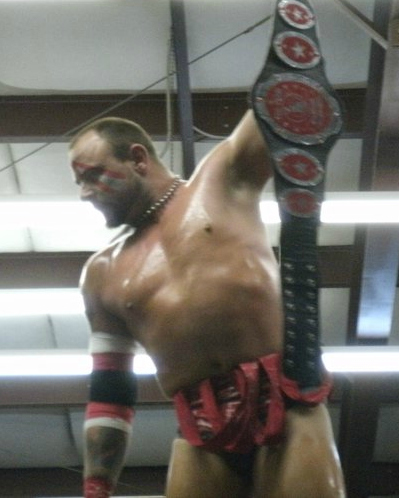
- Michaels holding a title

Personal information
- Born: September 8, 1974 (age 51) Atlanta, Georgia, U.S.

Professional wrestling career
- Ring name: Rick Michaels
- Billed height: 6 ft 0 in (1.83 m)
- Billed weight: 234 lb (106 kg)
- Trained by: Bobby Fulton; Ricky Morton; Ted Allen
- Debut: November 10, 1991
- Retired: 2012

Rick Michaels (born September 8, 1974) is an American retired professional wrestler.

== Professional wrestling career ==
=== Extreme Championship Wrestling (1992–1993) ===
Michaels debuted for Extreme Championship Wrestling on June 23, 1992, under the gimmick of "Super Ninja" and lost to Hurricane Curry. Throughout late 1992 and early 1993, Michaels would team up with various partners such as the Canadian Wolfman, Bay Ragni and The Samoan Warrior to take on the ECW Tag Team Champions. His last match in ECW, Michaels would lose to Tommy Cairo.

=== Pro Wrestling Federation (1993–1999) ===
On March 19, 1993, Michaels would debut for Pro Wrestling Federation, still using the Super Ninja gimmick but now called Super Ninja #1, and lost to Super Mario in his first match. For many months Michaels would job to other wrestlers such as Star Ryder and Jeff Victory however he would gain his first victory in October over Ravishing Randy.

On December 10, 1993, Michaels would form a tag team with called The Super Ninjas with Super Ninja #2. The team would find limited success thought 1994, losing almost all their matches and picking up their first victory as a team in January 1994 against Randy Sledge and Terry Austin. The Super Ninjas disbanded in late 1994

On December 14, 1997, Michaels would win the vacant PWF Junior Heavyweight Championship however just before his one hundredth day as champion he would lose it to The Flaming Youth on March 23, 1998. Three months later he would defeat the current champion Strutter and would lose it once again to Scotty Hotbody on September 16, 1998. From late 1998 to late 1999, Super Ninja would trade victories and the PWF Junior Heavyweight Championship with Handsome Stranger. Super Ninja lost the championship to Thunder Bright on October 30, 1999, which was also one of the last PWF shows.

=== National Championship Wrestling / NWA Wildside ===
After wrestling on the independent circuit, he co-founded National Championship Wrestling in 1997 and won the promotion's Television Championship in January 1997. After losing the title on June 5, Michaels reclaimed the title on July 24. He soon lost the title to Cham Pain and the title would ultimately be vacated until 1999, until Michaels defeated Scotty Wrenn to win the title in July 1999 before losing it for the final time to his student A.J. Styles the following month. Soon afterwards, NCW was turned into a National Wrestling Alliance territory and was renamed to NWA Wildside. Upon the renaming, Michaels went on to win the promotion's Heavyweight Championship in 1999 and 2001 and its United States Heavyweight Championship twice in 2004 before the territory folded in 2005.

==== Bad Attitude (1999–2001) ====
In addition to singles success, Michaels also found success as a tag team competitor upon forming a successful tag team with David Young called Bad Attitude. Together, they won the Tag Team Championship twice and would later win the NWA World Tag Team Championship three times before splitting in 2001 following a title loss. After splitting, Michaels feuded with Young and briefly formed a new team with Scottie Wrenn called the Union of Lost Souls to feud with Young. In response, Young allied himself with Terry Knight to form a "new" Bad Attitude. On July 7, Michaels and Young ended their feud when the Union of Lost Souls defeated the new Bad Attitude in an "Infernal Damnation" match.

=== World Wrestling Entertainment (2004–2005) ===
In late 2004, Michaels was hired by World Wrestling Entertainment as a tailor, but was released from his contract on September 29, 2005.

=== Hiatus and return (2007–2012) ===
After winning a Reunion Rumble on March 25, 2005, at NWA Wildside's event Hardcore Hell, Michaels took a hiatus from wrestling. On July 5, Michaels made his return to wrestling as he debuted in Deep South Wrestling in a tag team match, which he and his partner Tommy Too Much lost to Harley Crew (Brian Alexander and Pretty Boy Floyd). One week later, Michaels defeated DOG to enter a tournament to determine the promotion's new Heavyweight Champion. He then defeated Pretty Boy Floyd in the first round before losing to Murder-1 in the semi-finals. After defeating Scotty Blaze on July 19, Michaels wrestled his final match for the promotion on October 11 as he lost to Adrian Hawkins.

After leaving DSW, Michaels made sporadic appearances on the independent circuit. On March 27, 2008, Michaels debuted in NAWA Ring Champions one half of The Exotic Ones with Simon Sermon, where they were awarded the promotion's Tag Team Championship after defeating Kyle Matthews and Kid Ego. On January 9, 2009, The Exotic Ones lost to Micah Taylor and Tracy Taylor in the first round of a tournament to determine the new NWA Prime Time Tag Team Champions. After a hiatus, The Exotic Ones reunited on February 12.

== Championships and accomplishments ==
- National Championship Wrestling / NWA Wildside
  - NCW Heavyweight Championship (2 times)
  - NCW Tag Team Championship (1 time) – David Young
  - NCW Television Championship (3 times)
  - NWA Wildside Beat the Champ Championship (1 time)
  - NWA Wildside Heavyweight Championship (2 times)
  - NWA Wildside Tag Team Championship (2 times) – with David Young
  - NWA Wildside United States Heavyweight Championship (2 times)
- National Wrestling Alliance
  - NWA World Tag Team Championship (3 times) – with David Young
- NAWA Ring Champions
  - NAWA Ring Champions Tag Team Championship (1 time) – Simon Sermon
- Pro Wrestling Illustrated
  - Ranked No. 379 of the top 500 singles wrestlers in the PWI 500 in 2002
