= Bad Attitude (professional wrestling) =

Professional wrestling tag team

In professional wrestling, Bad Attitude has been used as a name for two tag teams. The first was a short-lived tag team of Bobby Eaton and Steve Keirn in World Championship Wrestling in 1994. The second was the team of David Young and Rick Michaels which wrestled in the independent circuit from 1999 to 2001.

== Bobby Eaton and Steve Keirn ==
Bad Attitude

Tag team
- Members: Bobby Eaton; Steve Keirn
- Name(s): Bad Attitude
- Billed heights: 6 ft 0 in (1.83 m) – Eaton; 6 ft 0 in (1.83 m) – Keirn
- Combined billed weight: 448 lb (203 kg)
- Debut: 1994
- Disbanded: 1994

Bobby Eaton and Steve Keirn formed a short-lived tag team in WCW during Keirn's brief career in WCW in 1994. Both men had formed successful tag teams with Stan Lane in their careers. The team was called Bad Attitude. The team found little success and had a short feud with Brian and Brad Armstrong, losing to them in dark matches before Bash at the Beach and Fall Brawl pay-per-views. Following the feud, Keirn remained in WCW for a short while before leaving WCW and ending Bad Attitude.

== David Young and Rick Michaels ==
Bad Attitude

Tag team
- Members: Rick Michaels; David Young
- Name(s): Bad Attitude
- Billed heights: 6 ft 0 in (1.83 m) – Michaels; 5 ft 11 in (1.80 m) – Young
- Combined billed weight: 472 lb (214 kg)
- Debut: 1999
- Disbanded: 2001

Bad Attitude was a tag team consisting of David Young and Rick Michaels. The team mainly wrestled in National Wrestling Alliance's NWA Wildside territory, winning the promotion's Wildside Tag Team Championship 2 times. Bad Attitude were also 3 time NWA World Tag Team Champions.

=== National Wrestling Alliance (1999–2001) ===
David Young and Rick Michaels formed their tag team Bad Attitude in National Championship Wrestling (NCW) in 1999. They won the NCW Tag Team Championship on October 30, defeating Boogaloo Crew (J.C. Dazz and Scottie Wrenn). On November 20, Bad Attitude lost the tag title to Road Hoggs (Joe Harley and Pan Head Nelson) in a unification match for the NCW Tag Team Championship and the NWA Georgia Tag Team Championship. NCW became NWA Wildside and Bad Attitude continued to team in the promotion.

They pursued the promotion's Wildside Tag Team Championship. On January 8, 2000, Bad Attitude defeated The Underdogs (Big Eddie Cool and Mark E. Mark) for their first tag title. Bad Attitude dropped the titles to The Rock 'n' Roll Express (Robert Gibson and Ricky Morton) on February 19. On June 17, Bad Attitude was booked to win their second Wildside Tag Team Title by defeating Rock 'n' Roll Express.

While continuing their NWA Wildside Tag Team Championship reign, Bad Attitude won their first NWA World Tag Team Championship by defeating xXx (Curtis Thompson and Jeff Justice) on August 15. As a result, they were stripped of the NWA Wildside Tag Team Title. Bad Attitude held on the NWA World Tag Team Title for 172 days, before losing the title to The Bad Street Boys (Joey Matthews and Christian York) on February 3, 2001. On February 17, Bad Attitude defeated Bad Street Boys for their second NWA World Tag Team Title. They lost the titles to David Flair and Dan Factor on March 22. On March 23, Badd Attitude won their third NWA World Tag Team Title by defeating Flair and Factor in a rematch. On April 24, Bad Attitude lost the titles to The New Heavenly Bodies (Chris Nelson and Vito DeNucci). Bad Attitude tried to regain the titles but could not win back the belts. The team eventually disbanded in 2001.

== Championships and accomplishments ==
- David Young and Rick Michaels
  - National Championship Wrestling
    - NCW Tag Team Championship (1 time)
  - National Wrestling Alliance
    - NWA World Tag Team Championship (3 times)
    - NWA Wildside Tag Team Championship (2 times)
