= Knuckles Nelson =

American professional wrestler (born 1963)

Personal information
- Born: Brendan Higgins; September 26, 1963 (age 62) Providence, Rhode Island, U.S.
- Website: Knuckles Nelson on Myspace

Professional wrestling career
- Ring name(s): Brendan Higgins; Knuckles Nelson; Super Destroyer; Tully McShane
- Billed height: 6 ft 3 in (1.91 m)
- Billed weight: 225 lb (102 kg)
- Billed from: Reno, Nevada
- Trained by: Bob Evans; Paul Lazon; Nick Steel; Brian Brieger
- Debut: 1994
- Retired: October 11, 2003

Brendan Higgins (born September 26, 1963), best known by his ring name Knuckles Nelson is a retired American professional wrestler, promoter and trainer who wrestled throughout the North American independent circuit during the 1990s and 2000s. He competed in several regional promotions such as the Century Wrestling Alliance, the National Wrestling Alliance and the United States Wrestling Association. He also briefly appeared in World Championship Wrestling and the World Wrestling Federation as well as touring Japan as Super Destroyer between 1997 and 1999.

He was a founding member of Tony Rumble's The Brotherhood, a "heel" stable which dominated NWA New England during the late 1990s, and which included Eric Sbraccia, Dukes Dalton and Rick Fuller. He and Sbraccia won the NWA World Tag Team Championship in 1998, and defended both the World and NWA New England titles with Sbraccia and other Brotherhood members in their home promotion for almost two years.

Following Rumble's death, Nelson helped run NWA New England for a time and later became a full-time booker and promoter for Wrestling Star Wars until his retirement in 2003. As head of "The Combat Zone" wrestling school, he was involved in training several independent wrestlers, most notably, Yankee Pro Wrestling veteran "Big Gun" Jim Sergeant.

== Biography ==
=== Early life and career ===
Born in Providence, Rhode Island. As a child, he often watched wrestling on Fox 25 Boston and was a fan of both World Class Championship Wrestling and the Von Erich family as well as a reader of wrestling newsletters The Torch and The Observer. As a young man, he decided to try his luck in the business after reading an article in the Warwick Beacon of a retired professional wrestler starting a local independent promotion. He and a friend visited a trainer at the promotion's headquarters, then occupying a rundown warehouse in Providence, and returned the following day to start their first training session. It was there that they met local independent wrestlers Bob Evans and Paul Lazon who invited them to their wrestling school in Freetown, Massachusetts.

Nelson took them up on their offer and soon began training at the Freetown facility. It was there that he met Nick Steel and Brian Brieger who, in addition to Evans and Lazon, became his principal trainers. One of his earliest matches was against his former trainer Bob Evans whom he defeated at a show in New Bedford, Massachusetts. He eventually made his debut in 1994, under the name Tully McShane, and spent some time in Coastal Pro Wrestling before meeting Tony Rumble who would bring him into his emerging Boston promotion, the Century Wrestling Alliance.

=== Century Wrestling Alliance (1995-1998) ===
Nelson's first match in the CWA was under a mask and against Rumble himself. He suffered a bloody mouth during the match and Rumble ended up beating him with a Boston crab submission hold. Rumble paid him $100 and booked for three more shows beginning the start of his long career in the promotion.

Rumble didn't like the "Tully McShane" name and began helping develop his later in-ring persona, Knuckles Nelson. On February 4, 1995, Nelson made a one-time appearance in the United States Wrestling Association where he teamed with The Shadow against PG-13 (J. C. Ice & Wolfie D). PG-13, then feuding with Tommy Rich and Doug Gilbert over the USWA Tag Team Championship, were attacked by their rivals during the post-match interview. Back in the CWA, he was initially paired with Sonny C as The Cash Money Boys but split up and feuded with each other during 1996. A top contender to the CWA Heavyweight Championship during this time, he was unable to take the title from then champion Kevin Sullivan. He did, however, win the CWA Television Championship from Vic Steamboat in Derry, New Hampshire, on July 6, 1996. Earlier that year, he had also appeared on the 1st annual Eddie Gilbert Memorial Show in Cherry Hill, New Jersey, defeating the Inferno Kid after hitting him with brass knuckles.

He was also a regular on the promotion's television show, Mass Madness. On one occasion, during a match against a young Steve Bradley, Nelson attempted to use his brass knuckles but lost them to Bradley. The referee, seeing the foreign object, immediately disqualified Bradley giving Nelson the win. It was also on the show that he started teaming with Erich Sbraccia.

On March 17, 1997, Knuckles Nelson appeared on Monday Night Nitro alongside longtime independent star T. Rantula to take on Lex Luger & The Giant in Savannah, Georgia. He and his tag team partner lost the match when The Giant pinned Nelson with a chokeslam and, following the match, Luger put T. Rantula in the "Torture Rack". On May 18, he faced another WCW tag team, The Power Company (Dave & Dean Power), whom he and partner Tre lost to. At the end of the night, Nelson and Tre took part in a 10-man tag team match with Tony Rumble, Waldo and Rick Fuller to beat Vic Steamboat, El Mascarado, Baby Black and the Power Company. Holding the CWA Television Championship for over a year and a half, Nelson lost the title back to Steamboat in Brattleboro, Vermont, on December 8, 1997.

=== NWA New England (1998-1999) ===
On January 24, 1998, Knuckle Nelson appeared at a CWA fundraising event, billed as "Killer Kowalski Night" held at the high school in Ridgefield, CT. Along with Killer Kowalski in attendance, other high-profile stars included Tony Rumble, King Kong Bundy, Tito Santana, Devon Storm and Johnny Grunge. That same night, the CWA announced that it would be joining the National Wrestling Alliance and changed its name to NWA New England. That same year, Rumble arranged for Nelson to tour Japan as Super Destroyer with Barry Darsow and Wild Bill Irwin, Irwin having once been a mainstay of World Class Championship Wrestling.

By early-1998, Nelson had formed a successful tag team with Erich Sbraccia as part of Tony Rumble's "heel" stable The Brotherhood. Two months before dropping the television title to Steamboat, they had won the CWA Tag Team Championship from The Extremists (Ace Darling & Devon Storm) and held the titles until the CWA became NWA New England. He and Sbraccia later represented NWA New England in an interpromotional match at the NWA 50th Anniversary Show where they faced NWA World Tag Team Champions The Border Patrol (Agent Gunn & Agent Maxx) from NWA All-Star Wrestling. This was a "Four Corners" match that included Team Extreme (Kit Carson & Khris Germany) from NWA Southwest and Barry Windham & Tully Blanchard, although Windham was later replaced with Dr. Tom Prichard. Together with manager Tony Rumble, The Brotherhood defeated The Border Patrol to win the titles.

Although the NWA wanted Nelson and Sbraccia to tour the various NWA territories to defend the championship, Rumble fought to keep the titles in New England. Their run as the tag team champions is considered one of the high points in NWA New England's history. On February 18, 1999, Knuckles Nelson also won the NWA New England Heavyweight Championship from Trooper Gilmore in Mansfield, Massachusetts.

Early in their title reign, Sbraccia was injured and other members of the stable often substituted for him. The titles were held up on March 3, 1999, when Nelson and his partner were forced to miss a scheduled title defense in North Richland Hills, Texas, due to heavy snow. Staying in NWA New England, he and Dukes Dalton defeated Jason Rage & Slyk Wagner Brown at a house show in Southbridge, Massachusetts, several days later. He and Sbraccia also made their first WWF appearances, though wrestling in separate singles matches, taking on Hardcore Holly and Mideon respectively in the opening matches of Shotgun Saturday Night.

The Brotherhood were given back the belts after a June 10 rematch in Dallas, Texas, winning via disqualification. He and Rick Fuller briefly lost the titles to The Public Enemy (Rocco Rock & Johnny Grunge) in Bolton, Massachusetts, on June 17, but regained them two days later with Dukes Dalton in Dorchester. He and Dalton also won the NWA Tag Team titles from The Arc Angels (Damon D'Arcangelo & Phoenix King) in Somerville on August 22 which, in addition to the NWA World Tag Team titles, they continued to defend for another month.

He made another WWF appearance on the September 11th edition of WWF Jakked against The Big Boss Man. He and Dukes lost the NWA New England titles almost two weeks later to the New York Posse (Curtis Slamdawg & Jay Kobain) in Somerville, Massachusetts, on September 22. He wrestled Slamdawg, who also succeeded him as heavyweight champion, in a singles match at Somerville's Good Time Emporium that same day. He would face him again at an event for Connecticut Championship Wrestling in East Haven, Connecticut, at the end of the year.

On September 25, he and Dukes Dalton, managed by Jeff Katz, lost the NWA World Tag Team titles to Team Extreme (Kit Carson & Khris Germany) at the NWA 51st Anniversary Show at the Grady Cole Center in Charlotte, North Carolina. On October 30, he made a second appearance on WWF Jakked with Dukes Dalton against The Headbangers (Mosh & Thrasher). He and Dalton would regain the belts a final time, beating the New York Posse in Thomaston, Connecticut, on October 2, and would continue to hold the belts until the stable split up early the next year.

When promoter Tony Rumble died of a heart attack in November 1999, he and Katz were chosen by his widow and co-owner Ellen Magliaro to take over running the promotion. Shortly thereafter, Nelson started his own promotion and Katz moved to Las Vegas to take over the morning drive show on that market's most successful talk radio station. After that, he and Katz were replaced by Jason Delgatta. Delgatta portrayed Tony Rumble's kayfabe son, "Boston Bad Boy" Jason Rumble who would remain the top star in the promotion.

=== Wrestling Star Wars and retirement (1999-2003) ===
Nelson founded Wrestling Star Wars, a regional promotion based in Salisbury Beach, Massachusetts, which he initially started in memory of Tony Rumble feeling it was his duty "to continue his work".

On October 11, 2003, Nelson retired from the business in favor of spending more time with his family. In August 2009, he gave an interview with longtime NWA commentator Brian Webster discussing his post-wrestling career and the current state of wrestling.

== Championships and accomplishments ==
- Century Wrestling Alliance

- CWA Television Championship (1 time)
- CWA Tag Team Championship (1 time) – with Eric Sbraccia

- National Wrestling Alliance

- NWA World Tag Team Championship (3 times) – with Erich Sbraccia, Dukes Dalton and Rick Fuller

- NWA New England

- NWA New England Heavyweight Championship (1 time)
- NWA New England Television Championship (1 time)
- NWA New England Tag Team Championship (2 times) – with Dukes Dalton

- New England Pro Wrestling Hall of Fame
  - Class of 2014
- Pro Wrestling Illustrated

- PWI ranked him #255 of the 500 best singles wrestlers of the PWI 500 in 1996.
