= IPW United States Heavyweight Championship =

Details
- Promotion: Innovate Pro Wrestling
- Date established: August 19, 2017
- Date retired: May 29, 2021

Other name(s)
- IPW United States Heavyweight Championship (2017-2021)
Statistics
- First champion(s): Devin Driscoll
- Final champion(s): Toby Farley
- Most reigns: Elliot Russell (2 times)
- Longest reign: Jordan Kage (558 days)
- Shortest reign: Toby Farley (2 days)
- Heaviest champion: Elliot Russell (240 lb (110 kg))
- Lightest champion: Axton Ray (167 lb (76 kg))

The IPW United States Heavyweight Championship was the top title in the American independent wrestling promotion Innovate Pro Wrestling. On August 19, 2017 at ReGenesis; promoter Tony Givens announced that NWA Smoky Mountain was leaving the National Wrestling Alliance and their name was changing to Innovate Wrestling. Toby Farley who was the reigning NWA Mountain Empire Champion defeated Tommy Lou Retton to become the interim IPW United States Heavyweight Champion with a pending match with Chase Owens upon his return. Devin Driscoll became the official championship on October 21, 2017 at Shocktober in a Four-way match when he defeated Chase Owens, Farley, and Jeff Connelly.

On May 29, 2021, Toby Farley defeated Chris Richards for the IPW Television Championship. Both titles were merged and the IPW Grand Championship was created. Farley became the inaugural champion as a result.

== Title history ==
=== Names ===
Name	Time of use
IPW United States Heavyweight Championship	August 19, 2017 – May 29, 2021

=== Reigns ===
Key
No.	Overall reign number
Reign	Reign number for the specific champion
Days	Number of days held

No.	Champion	Championship change			Reign statistics		Notes	Ref.
No.	Champion	Date	Event	Location	Reign	Days	Notes	Ref.
—	Toby Farley	August 19, 2017	ReGenesis	Kingsport, Tennessee	—	63	Farley who was the reigning NWA Mountain Empire Champion defeated Tommy Lou Retton to become the interim IPW United States Heavyweight Champion	
1	Devin Driscoll	October 21, 2017	Shocktober	Johnson City, Tennessee	1	217	Driscoll defeated Chase Owens, Toby Farley, and Jeff Connelly in a Four-way match to become the official IPW United States Heavyweight Champion.	
2	Elliott Russell	May 26, 2018	Collision Course XIV	Kingsport, Tennessee	1	84		
3	Jeff Connelly	August 18, 2018	Fire on the Mountain	Kingsport, Tennessee	1	105		
4	Elliot Russell	December 1, 2018	Seasons Beatings	Morristown, Tennessee	2	175		
5	Axton Ray	May 25, 2019	Collision Course XV	Kingsport, Tennessee	1	175		
6	Jordan Kage	November 16, 2019	House show	Kingsport, Tennessee	1	558	Kage cashed in his VIP Fast Pass on Ray to win the title.	
7	Toby Farley	May 27, 2021	House show	Kingsport, Tennessee	1	2		
—	Deactivated	May 29, 2021	House show	Kingsport, Tennessee	—	—	After defeating Chris Richards for the IPW Television Championship, the titles were merged and Farley became the first IPW Grand Champion.	

== Combined reigns ==
Rank	Champion	No. of reigns	Combined days
1	Jordan Kage	1	558
2	Elliot Russell	2	260
3	Devin Driscoll	1	217
4	Axton Ray	1	175
5	Jeff Connelly	1	105
6	Toby Farley	1	2
