= Jax Dane =

American professional wrestler (1981–2024)

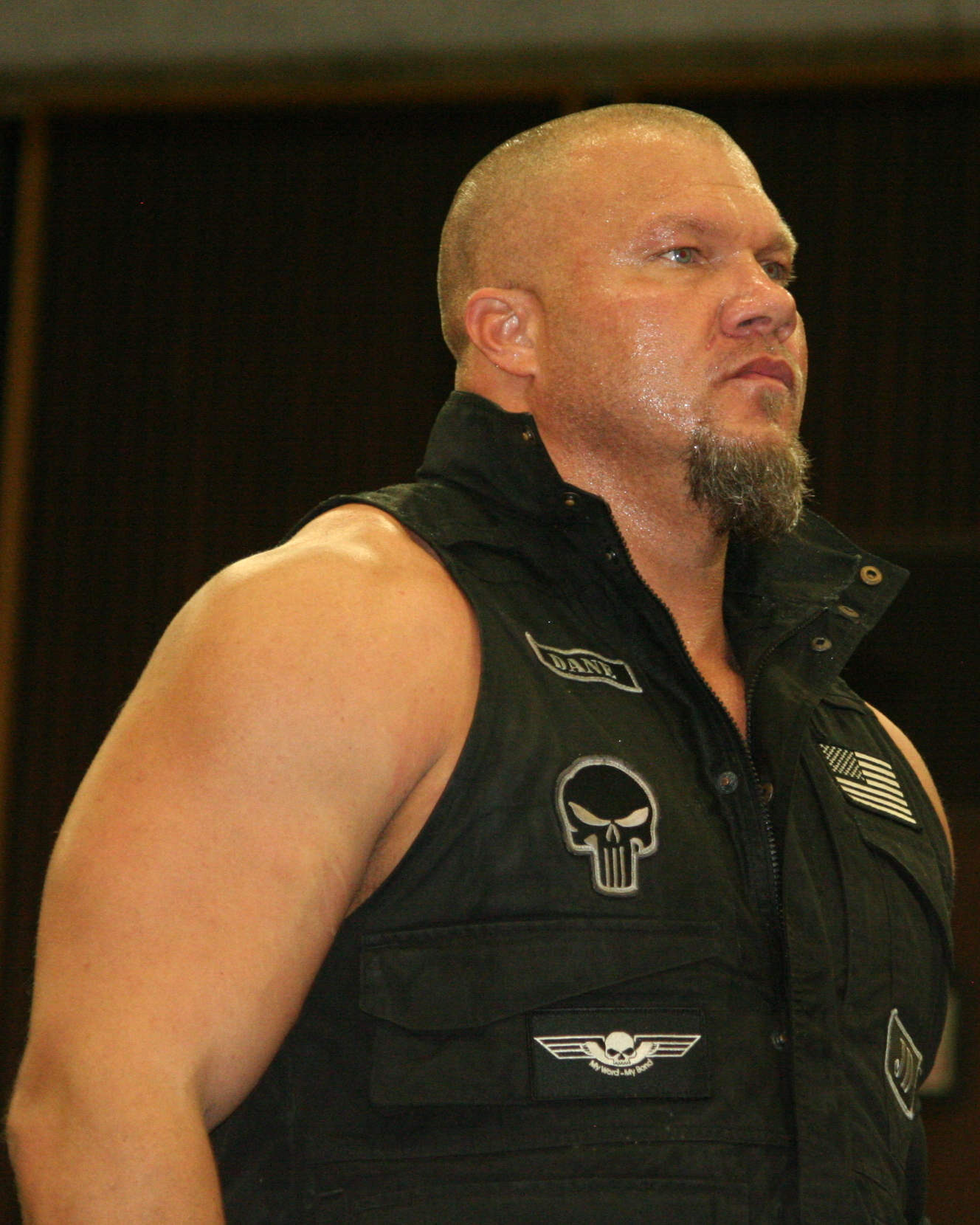
- Dane in 2014

Personal information
- Born: Jeremy Dane Laymon; March 10, 1976 Bakewell, Tennessee, U.S.
- Died: December 25, 2024 (aged 48)

Professional wrestling career
- Ring name(s): Jax Dane; Wilcox
- Billed height: 6 ft 4 in (1.93 m)
- Billed weight: 310 lb (140 kg)
- Billed from: Austin, Texas
- Trained by: Dr. Tom Prichard; Rip Rogers; Nick Dinsmore; Rob Conway
- Debut: 2009

Jeremy Dane Laymon (March 10, 1976 – December 25, 2024) was an American professional wrestler, better known by his ring name, Jax Dane. He was known for his tenure with various National Wrestling Alliance (NWA) member promotions. He was a former NWA World Heavyweight Champion, NWA National Heavyweight, NWA North American Heavyweight and NWA World Tag Team Champion. He was also known for his work for New Japan Pro-Wrestling (NJPW), Impact Wrestling, and Ring of Honor (ROH).

== Professional wrestling career ==
=== National Wrestling Alliance (2012–2016) ===
==== Early years (2012–2014) ====
After spending three years in the independent circuit, Dane began wrestling for NWA Houston in May 2012. On July 14, 2012, Dane and Raymond Rowe won the NWA Lone Star Tag Team Championship, defeating Austin Rhodes and Chaz Taylor. After only three successful title defences Dane and Rowe lost the Tag Team Championship to The Kingz of The Underground (Ryan Genesis and Scot Summers) on November 9, 2012 and were forced to disband as a tag team. December 14, 2012, Dane defeated Raymond Rowe, Ryan Genesis and Scot Summers in a fatal four way match for the NWA Lone Star Heavyweight Championship. Dane defended the title against former WWE and TNA superstars Scott Steiner and Lance Hoyt, before losing the Championship to Byron Wilcott on July 19, 2014. On August 17, 2014, Dane lost the NWA BOW Heavyweight Championship to Charlie Haas.

==== The IronGodz (2012–2014) ====
On November 9, Dane made his New Japan Pro-Wrestling in-ring debut at Power Struggle, where The IronGodz (Jax Dane and Rob Conway) defeated K.E.S. (Davey Boy Smith, Jr. and Lance Archer) and Tencozy (Hiroyoshi Tenzan and Satoshi Kojima) in the first fall of a two-fall three-way match to win the NWA World Tag Team Championship. From November 23 to December 7, Dane and Conway took part in New Japan's 2014 World Tag League, where they finished with a record of three wins and three losses, failing to advance to the semifinals. Dane wrestled another match for New Japan on January 5, 2014, when he and Conway successfully defended the NWA World Tag Team Championship against Tencozy. Dane and Conway returned to New Japan on April 6 at Invasion Attack 2014, where they lost the NWA World Tag Team Championship to Tencozy. The following week, Dane took part in New Japan's trip to Taiwan, defeating Hiroyoshi Tenzan in his first singles match for the promotion on April 12, before he and Conway failed in their attempt to regain the NWA World Tag Team Championship from Tencozy on April 14. Dane and Conway returned to New Japan in November to take part in the 2014 World Tag League. The team finished second to last in their block with a record of three wins and four losses.

==== Championship success (2015–2016) ====
On February 6, 2015, Dane defeated Lou Marconi to win the NWA National Heavyweight Championship. On April 12, Dane defeated Tim Storm to win the NWA North American Heavyweight Championship and unify it with NWA National Title. On April 17, Dane competed in NWA Smoky Mountain Wrestling's Smoky Mountain Cup, defeating Gavin Daring in the first round, and going on to defeat Shawn Shultz, Vince Brent, Chase Owens, Jason Kincaid, and Jeff Connelly in a six-way elimination match to win the 2015 Smoky Mountain Cup. On May 28, 2015, Dane vacated the National Heavyweight and the North American Heavyweight Championships due to an injury. On August 29, 2015, Dane defeated Hiroyoshi Tenzan to become the NWA World Heavyweight Champion and ending Tenzan's reign after nearly seven months. Dane would go on to hold the title for nearly fourteen months before finally losing it to Tim Storm on October 21, 2016.

=== Ring of Honor (2016–2017) ===
On October 24, 2016, it was announced that Dane would make his debut at Ring of Honor at the event Survival of the Fittest. After defeating Donovan Dijak in his first round match, Dane advanced to the six-way final match, which was won by Bobby Fish.

On February 3, 2017, Dane made his return to ROH teaming with War Machine in a losing effort to the then ROH World Six-Man Tag Team Champions, The Kingdom at the Undisputed Legacy show in San Antonio, Texas. The next night in Dallas, at the Honor Reigns Supreme event, Dane lost a Four Corner Survival match to Will Ferrara, Johnathan Gresham and Sho Tanaka were also in the match.

=== Impact Wrestling (2017) ===
Dane, under the name Wilcox, debuted on the April 20, 2017, episode of Impact Wrestling by joining forces with Mayweather as a tag team called V.o.W, "Veterans of War"; both defeated Fallah Bahh and Mario Bokara in their debut match. On November 14, 2017, his profile was officially removed from the Impact Wrestling website, confirming his departure from the company.

=== Ohio Valley Wrestling (2018–2024) ===
On the June 23, 2018, episode of OVW TV, Dane made his Ohio Valley Wrestling (OVW) debut as a member of the War Kings along with Crimson defeating OVW Southern Tag Team Champions The Bro Godz (Colton Cage and Dustin Jackson) in a non-title match. On August 4, 2018, at OVW Saturday Night Special, War Kings defeated The Bro Godz (Colton Cage and Dustin Jackson) to become the OVW Southern Tag Team Champions.

=== Return to NWA (2020–2024) ===
On the February 25, 2020, episode of NWA Powerrr, Dane appeared with Danny Deals to challenge Tim Storm.

Jax lost the NWA National Championship to Cyon at NWA 74 at The Chase Ballroom in St. Louis, MO on August 27, 2022.

He remained active in the NWA until his death. His final match, where he and Baron Von Storm defeated Jake Dumas and Zyon, took place at the NWA Samhain 2 taping and aired on December 17, 2024.

== Death ==
Following complications from a heart attack suffered in November, Dane died on December 25, 2024 at the age of 48. The National Wrestling Alliance issued a statement on his death on their website.

== Championships and accomplishments ==
- America's Most Liked Wrestling
  - Big Man Bash Tournament (2017)
  - Scott Eiland Memorial Rumble (2019)
- National Wrestling Alliance
  - NWA World Heavyweight Championship (1 time)
  - NWA North American Heavyweight Championship (1 time)
  - NWA National Heavyweight Championship (2 times)
  - NWA World Tag Team Championship (1 time) – with Rob Conway
  - NWA Champions Series Tournament (2021) – with Trevor Murdoch, Jennacide, The Masked Mystery Man, and Colby Corino
  - First Triple Crown Champion
- NWA Branded Outlaw Wrestling
  - NWA BOW Heavyweight Championship (1 time)
- NWA Houston
  - NWA Texas Heavyweight Championship (1 time)
  - NWA Lone Star Heavyweight Championship (1 time)
  - NWA Lone Star Tag Team Championship (1 time) – with Raymond Rowe
  - First NWA Triple Crown Champion
- NWA Smoky Mountain Wrestling
  - Smoky Mountain Cup (2015)
- Ohio Valley Wrestling
  - OVW Southern Tag Team Championship (2 times) – with Crimson
- Pro Wrestling Illustrated
  - Ranked No. 78 of the top 500 singles wrestlers in the PWI 500 in 2016
- River City Wrestling
  - RCW Tag Team Championship (1 time) – with Ryan Sorenson
- Southwest Wrestling Entertainment
  - SWE Texas Heavyweight Championship (1 time)
