= Smoky Mountain Cup =

Smoky Mountain Cup is a professional wrestling event held by Innovate Wrestling as a one-night tournament. It was first held on April 1, 2011.

== List of winners ==
Year	Wrestler(s)
2011	Chase Owens
2012	Sigmon
2013	Ricky Morton
2014	Jason Kincaid
2015	Jax Dane
2016	Jordan Kage
2017	Toby Farley
2018	Elliott Russell
2019	Axton Ray
2022	Chase Owens (x2)
2023	Jason Kincaid (x2)
2025	Axton Ray (x2)
2026	Toby Farley (x2)

== Results ==
=== Smoky Mountain Cup (2011) ===
The first Smoky Mountain Cup took place on April 1, 2011, in Kingsport, Tennessee.

No.	Semifinal Results
1.	Menace defeated Shawn Schultz
2.	Jeff Connelly defeated Frank Parker
3.	Jason Kincaid defeated Keith Knox
4.	Chase Owens defeated Eddie Golden
5.	Chance Prophet defeated Nick Hammonds
6.	Alyx Winters defeated Gavin Daring

No.	Final Results	Note
1.	Chase Owens defeated Alyx Winters and Chance Prophet and Jason Kincaid and Jeff Connelly and Menace	Six Way Elimination Match

=== Smoky Mountain Cup (2012) ===
The second Smoky Mountain Cup took place on March 30, 2012, in Kingsport, Tennessee.

No.	Semifinal Results
1.	Zac Vincent defeated Jeff Connelly
2.	Sigmon defeated Alyx Winters
3.	Shawn Shultz defeated Shane Andrews
4.	Menace defeated Lance Erickson
5.	Jason Kincaid defeated Eric Darkstorm
6.	Chase Owens defeated Matt Conard

No.	Final Results	Note
1.	Sigmon defeated Chase Owens and Jason Kincaid and Menace and Shawn Shultz and Zac Vincent	Six Way Elimination Match

=== Smoky Mountain Cup (2013) ===
The third Smoky Mountain Cup took place on April 26, 2013, in Kingsport, Tennessee.

No.	Semifinal Results	Time
1.	Sigmon defeated Jason Kincaid	16:10
2.	Ricky Morton defeated Tony Kozina	7:27
3.	Kyle O'Reilly defeated Menace	11:30
4.	Jeff Connelly defeated Zac Vincent	12:08
5.	Damien Wayne defeated Shane Williams	12:09
6.	Adam Pearce defeated Vince Brent	11:37

No.	Final Results	Note	Time
1.	Ricky Morton defeated Adam Pearce and Damien Wayne and Jeff Connelly and Kyle O'Reilly and Sigmon	Six Way Elimination #1 Contenders Match for the NWA World Heavyweight Championship	14:55

=== Smoky Mountain Cup (2014) ===
The fourth Smoky Mountain Cup took place on April 19, 2014, in Kingsport, Tennessee.

No.	Semifinal Results
1.	Sugar Dunkerton defeated ATL and Jimmy Nutts
2.	Zac Vincent defeated Ron Mathis
3.	Joe Black defeated Eric Darkstorm
4.	Jason Kincaid defeated Fred Yehi
5.	Chris Richards defeated Vince Brent
6.	Chase Owens defeated Facade

No.	Final Results	Note
1.	Jason Kincaid defeated Chase Owens and Chris Richards and Joe Black and Sugar Dunkerton and Zac Vincent	Six Way Elimination Match

=== Smoky Mountain Cup (2015) ===
The fifth Smoky Mountain Cup took place on April 17, 2015, in Kingsport, Tennessee.

No.	Semifinal Results
1.	Vince Brent defeated Jordan Kage
2.	Shawn Schultz defeated Skylar Kruze
3.	Jeff Connelly defeated Nick Hammonds
4.	Jax Dane defeated Gavin Daring
5.	Jason Kincaid defeated Chris Richards
6.	Chase Owens defeated Wayne Adkins

No.	Final Results	Note
1.	Jax Dane defeated Chase Owens and Jason Kincaid and Jeff Connelly and Shawn Shultz and Vince Brent	Six Way Elimination Match
