= Triple Crown (professional wrestling) =

Professional wrestling accomplishment

The Triple Crown is an accomplishment recognized by various professional wrestling promotions. It is a distinction made to a professional wrestler who has won three of a single promotion's championships; specifically, a world championship, another singles championship, and a tag team championship. Promotions to officially recognize Triple Crown winners include WWE, All Elite Wrestling (AEW), Total Nonstop Action Wrestling (TNA), Ring of Honor (ROH), and National Wrestling Alliance (NWA) as well as the defunct promotions World Championship Wrestling (WCW), Extreme Championship Wrestling (ECW), and Lucha Underground.

== National promotions ==
=== All Elite Wrestling ===
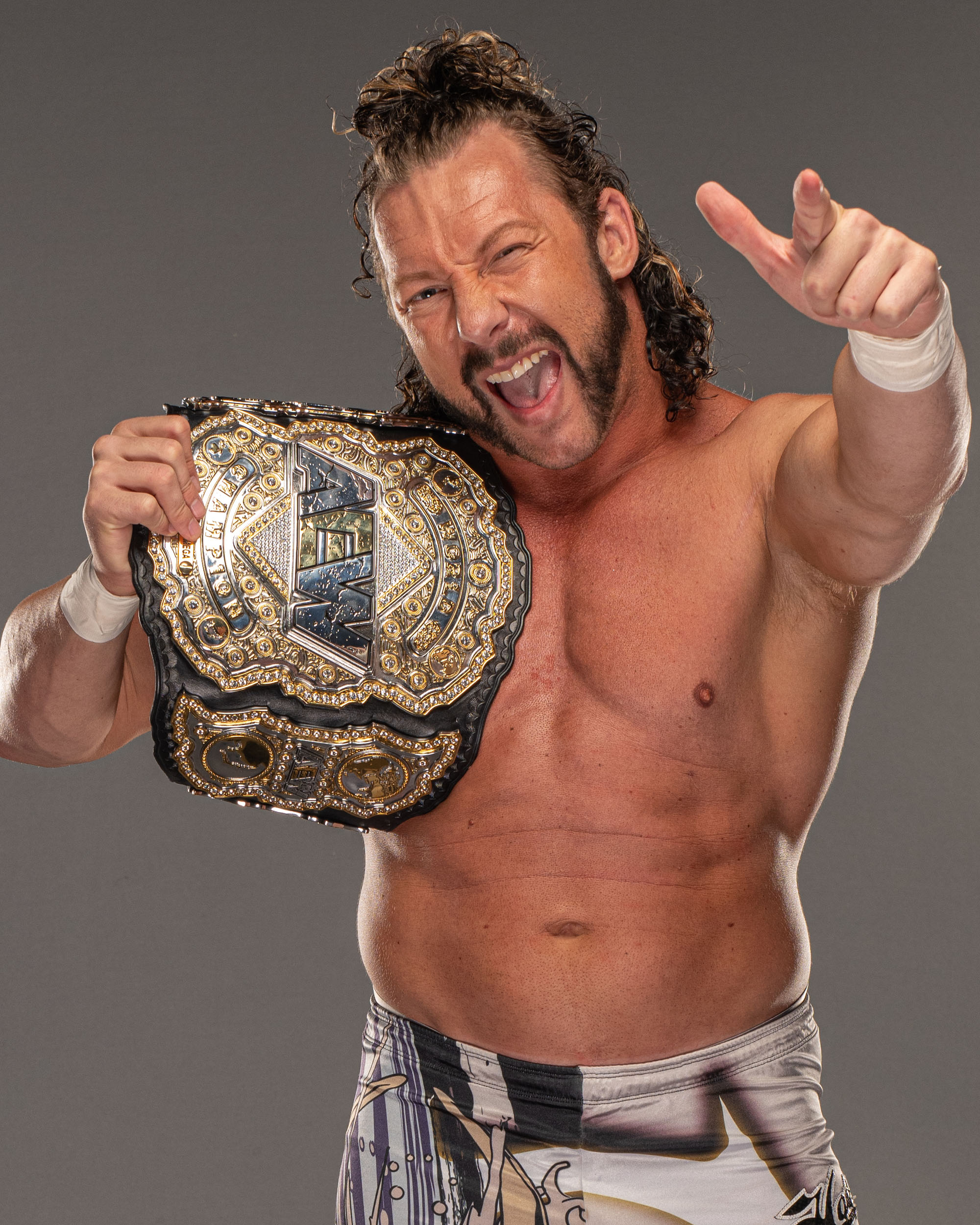
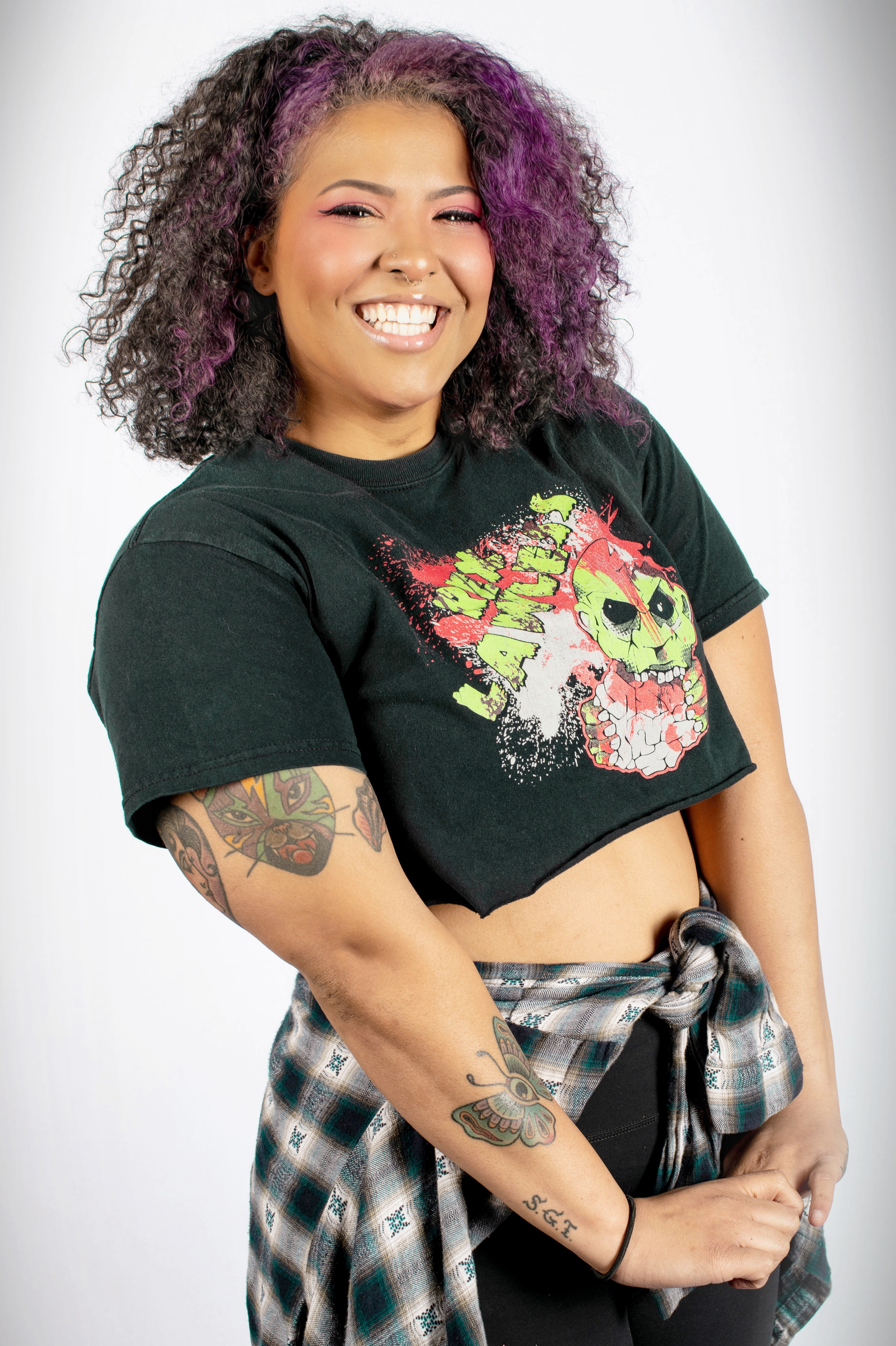
Kenny Omega and Willow Nightingale, AEW's first men's and women's Triple Crown winners.

The men's All Elite Wrestling (AEW) Triple Crown was established on September 4, 2022, defined by company CEO Tony Khan as consisting of the AEW World Championship, the AEW World Tag Team Championship, and the AEW World Trios Championship. Kenny Omega became the first men's Triple Crown winner after becoming part of inaugural Trios Championship team at All Out.

The AEW Women's Triple Crown was established on July 26, 2026, and consists of all three of AEW's women's championships: the AEW Women's World Championship, the AEW TBS Championship, and the AEW Women's World Tag Team Championship. Willow Nightingale became the inaugural Women's Triple Crown winner after winning the AEW Women's World Championship at Redemption.

==== List of AEW Triple Crown winners ====
Text
Dates in **bold**	The date the wrestler achieved the Triple Crown
Names in **bold**	Indicates the wrestler is also a Grand Slam Champion

Champion	Primary championship	Tag team championship	Trios championship
Champion	World	World Tag Team	World Trios
**Kenny Omega**	December 2, 2020	January 21, 2020 (with "Hangman" Adam Page)	**September 4, 2022** (with Matt Jackson and Nick Jackson)
"Hangman" Adam Page	November 13, 2021	January 21, 2020 (with Kenny Omega)	**January 14, 2026** (Note: AEW officially recognizes the date as January 17, 2026, due to the event airing on tape delay.) (with Mike Bailey and Kevin Knight)
Swerve Strickland	April 21, 2024	July 13, 2022 (with Keith Lee)	**August 30, 2026** (with Austin Creed and Kofi)

==== List of AEW Women's Triple Crown winners ====
Text
Dates in **bold**	The date the wrestler achieved the Triple Crown

Champion	Primary championship	Secondary championship	Tag team championship
Champion	World	TBS	World Tag
Willow Nightingale	**July 26, 2026**	April 21, 2024	December 10, 2025 (with Harley Cameron)
Kris Statlander	September 20, 2025	May 28, 2023	**November 14, 2026** (with Harley Cameron)

=== Extreme Championship Wrestling ===
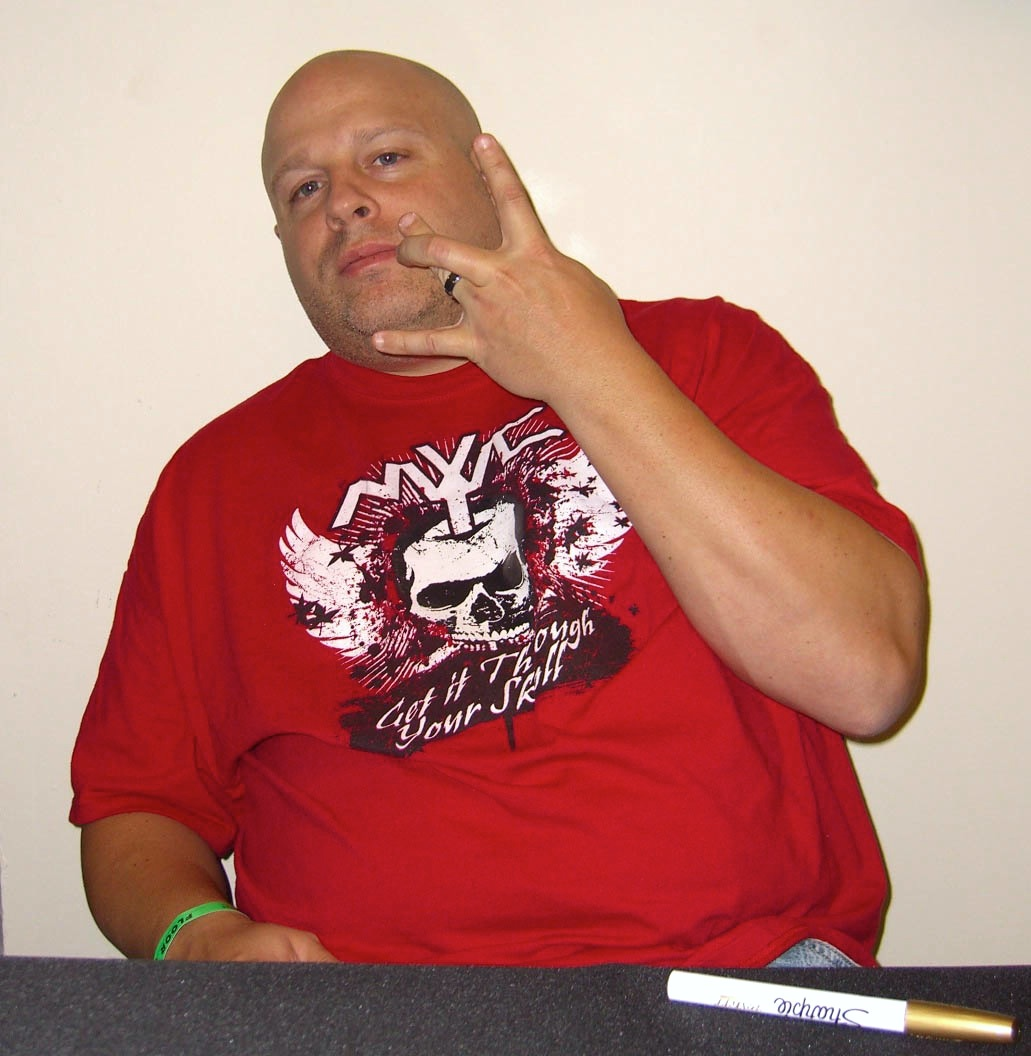
Mikey Whipwreck, the first ECW (post-"Extreme") Triple Crown winner

The Extreme Championship Wrestling (ECW) Triple Crown consisted of the ECW World Heavyweight Championship, the ECW World Television Championship and the ECW World Tag Team Championship.

ECW was founded in 1992 as Eastern Championship Wrestling until the name was changed to Extreme Championship Wrestling in 1994. Whilst Johnny Hotbody won all three titles before 1994, some websites consider Mikey Whipwreck the first Triple Crown Champion, due to the significance of the re-brand.

==== List of ECW Triple Crown winners ====
Text
Dates in **bold**	The date the wrestler achieved the Triple Crown

Champion	Primary championship	Secondary championship	Tag team championship
Champion	World Heavyweight	World Television	World Tag Team
Johnny Hotbody	April 26, 1992	August 12, 1992	**April 3, 1993** (with Chris Candido)
Mikey Whipwreck	**October 28, 1995**	May 13, 1994	August 27, 1994 (with Cactus Jack)
Sabu	**August 9, 1997**	November 13, 1993	February 4, 1995 (with Taz)
Taz	**January 10, 1999**	March 6, 1994	December 4, 1993 (with Kevin Sullivan)

=== Total Nonstop Action Wrestling ===
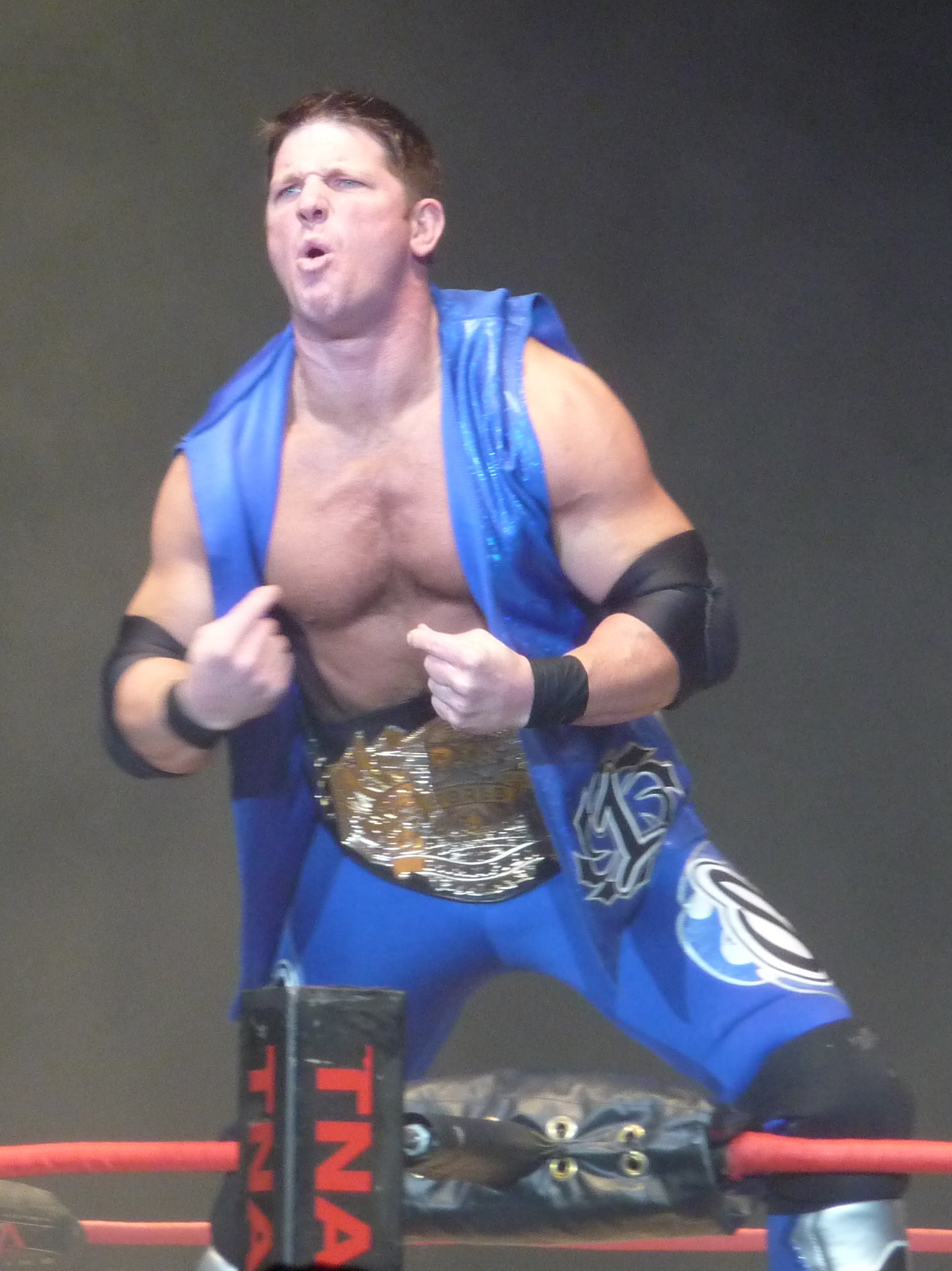
A.J. Styles, the first TNA Triple Crown winner

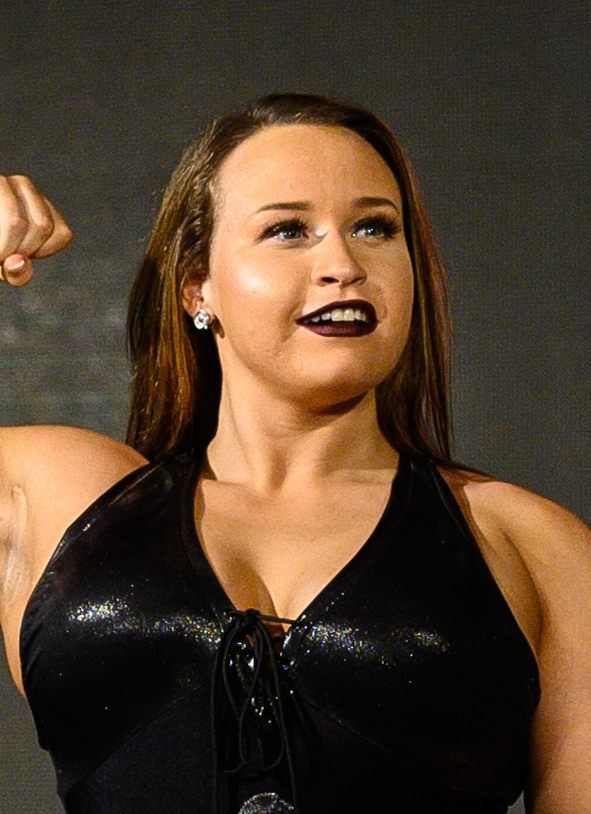
Jordynne Grace, the first TNA Knockouts Triple Crown winner

In Total Nonstop Action Wrestling (TNA – known as Impact Wrestling from 2017 to 2023), the Triple Crown was an accolade bestowed upon those who won (not necessarily concurrently) all three championships regularly contested in TNA between 2002 and 2007: the NWA World Heavyweight Championship, the TNA X Division Championship, and one-half of the NWA World Tag Team Championship. It was unknown whether or not those who won the NWA World Heavyweight and NWA World Tag Team Championships before or after TNA's acquisition and usage of the title belts would qualify for the Triple Crown.

In May 2007, TNA lost the rights to the NWA Worlds Heavyweight Championship and the NWA World Tag Team Championship and introduced the TNA World Heavyweight Championship and the TNA World Tag Team Championship. On July 8, 2007, Impact Wrestling (then known as TNA) stated that, should the then- X Division Champion Samoa Joe win the TNA World Tag Team Championship, this would leave him "just one step shy of becoming only the second Triple Crown Champion". This indicates that the TNA World Heavyweight Championship and the TNA World Tag Team Championship are part of the existing Triple Crown accolade.

==== List of TNA Triple Crown winners ====
The following is a list of TNA Triple Crown winners with dates indicating the wrestler's first reign with the respective championship. Under TNA's definition of the Triple Crown, wrestlers are eligible to win the Triple Crown each time they complete a new circuit.

To date, A.J. Styles and Eddie Edwards have won the TNA Triple Crown on more than one occasion, and Styles is the only wrestler to hold all of the eligible championships. Kurt Angle completed the Triple Crown the fastest, achieving it in a mere 92 days, between May and August 2007, and is the only wrestler to hold all the required championships at once.

Jordynne Grace became the first Knockouts Triple Crown winner after winning the TNA Knockouts World Championship, the TNA Knockouts World Tag Team Championship and the TNA Digital Media Championship - which is an open title for both male and female wrestlers. On March 29, 2025, authority figure Santino Marella retired the Digital Media Championship to replace it with the Knockouts Television Championship. Grace is the only Knockouts Triple Crown winner as of 2025.

Text
Dates in **bold**	The date the wrestler achieved the Triple Crown
Names in **bold**	Indicates the wrestler is also a Grand Slam Champion
Championships in italics	Indicates the title is an alternate title from the original definition of the Triple Crown
Dates in italics	The wrestler has won that title, but it does not contribute to their Triple Crown because they had already won the Triple Crown or they had already won a title at that same level
-	Indicates future reigns are impossible due to retirement or title(s) no longer being under Impact's control
Colors
	Won all Triple Crown eligible titles

Champion	Primary championships (either needed)		Secondary championship	Tag team championships (either needed)	
Champion	NWA World Heavyweight	TNA/Impact World	X Division	NWA World Tag Team	TNA/Impact World Tag Team
**A.J. Styles** (5 times)	**June 11, 2003**	September 20, 2009	June 19, 2002	July 3, 2002 (with Jerry Lynn)	October 14, 2007 (with Tomko)
Kurt Angle	-	May 13, 2007	**August 12, 2007**	-	**August 12, 2007** (No partner)
**Samoa Joe**	-	**April 13, 2008**	December 11, 2005	-	July 15, 2007 (No partner)
**Abyss**	November 19, 2006	-	**May 16, 2011**	February 4, 2004 (with A.J. Styles)	September 19, 2014 (with James Storm)
**Austin Aries**	-	July 8, 2012	September 11, 2011	-	**January 25, 2013** (with Bobby Roode)
Chris Sabin	-	**July 18, 2013**	May 14, 2003	-	July 11, 2010 (with Alex Shelley)
**Eric Young**	-	**April 10, 2014**	December 7, 2008	October 12, 2004 (with Bobby Roode)	April 15, 2008 (with Kaz)
Eddie Edwards (2 times)	-	**October 3, 2016**	June 12, 2016	-	February 23, 2014 (with Davey Richards)
Josh Alexander	-	**October 23, 2021**	April 25, 2021	-	July 5, 2019 (with Ethan Page)
Alex Shelley	-	**June 9, 2023**	January 11, 2009	-	July 11, 2010 (with Chris Sabin)
**Frankie Kazarian**	-	**November 13, 2025**	March 31, 2004	-	April 15, 2008 (with Eric Young)

==== List of TNA Knockouts Triple Crown winners ====
Text
Dates in **bold**	The date the wrestler achieved the Triple Crown

Champion	Primary championship	Secondary championships (either needed)		Tag team championship
Champion	Knockouts World	Digital Media	Knockouts Television	Knockouts World Tag Team
Jordynne Grace	January 18, 2020	**October 23, 2021**	N/A	April 25, 2021 (with Rachael Ellering)

=== Lucha Underground ===
Lucha Underground had three established titles in its promotion, the Lucha Underground Championship, the Gift of the Gods Championship and, uniquely, Trios Championship.

Johnny Mundo completed the Lucha Underground Triple Crown the fastest, achieving it in a mere 85 days between January and April 2016.

==== List of Lucha Underground Triple Crown winners ====
Text
Dates in **bold**	The date the wrestler achieved the Triple Crown

Champion	Primary championship	Secondary championship	Trios championship
Champion	Lucha Underground	Gift of the Gods	Trios
Fénix	November 22, 2015	April 19, 2015	**January 31, 2016** (with Aero Star and Drago)
Johnny Mundo	**April 10, 2016**	March 19, 2016	January 17, 2016 (with Jack Evans and P. J. Black)

=== National Wrestling Alliance ===
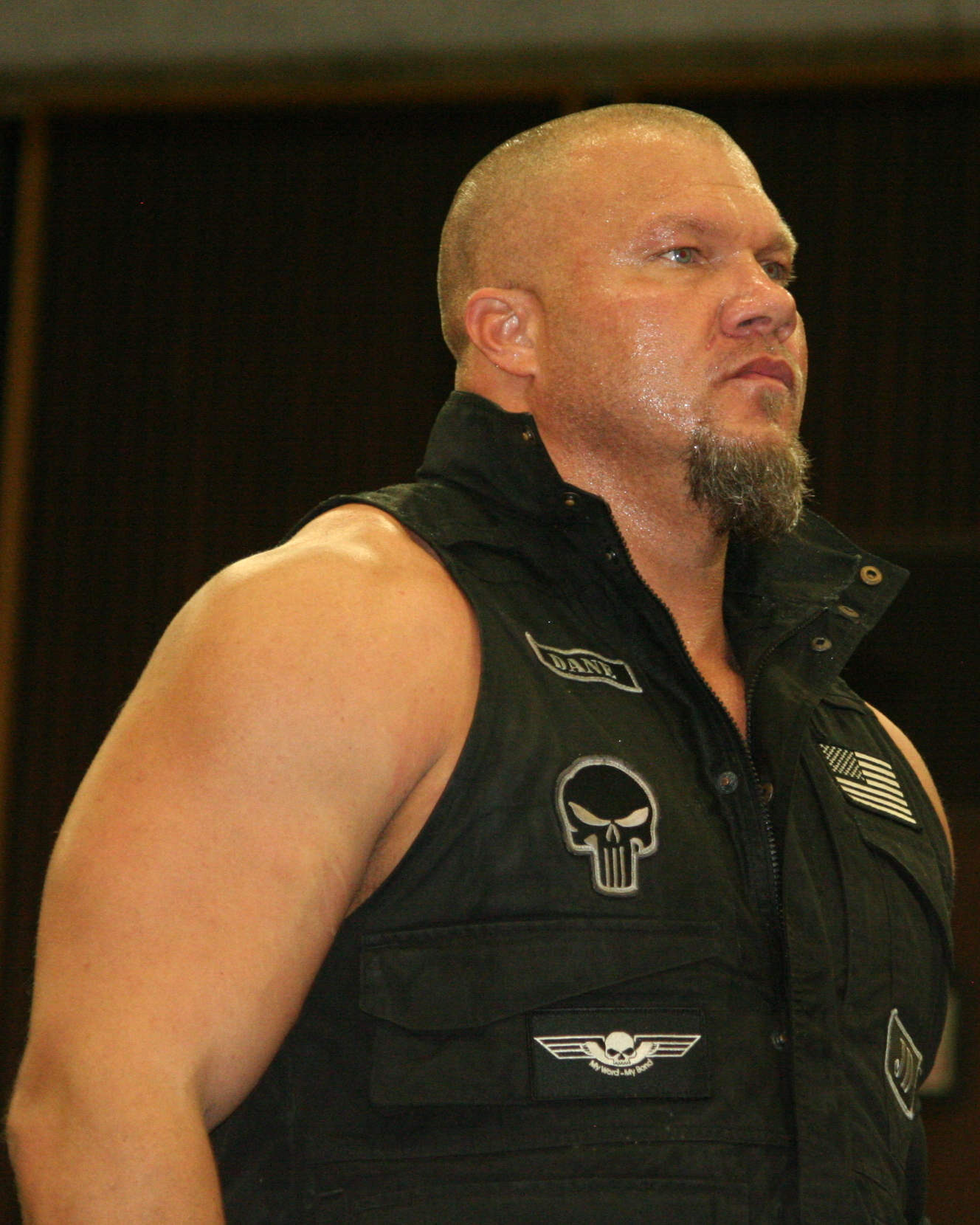
Jax Dane, the first NWA Triple Crown winner

The National Wrestling Alliance (NWA) Triple Crown consists of the NWA World's Heavyweight Championship, the NWA World Tag Team Championship, and the NWA National Heavyweight Championship. Jax Dane is recognized as the first ever NWA Triple Crown winner, holding the NWA World Heavyweight, National, and World Tag Team titles.

==== List of NWA Triple Crown winners ====
The following is a list of NWA Triple Crown winners with dates indicating the wrestler's first or only reign with the respective championship.

Text
Dates in **bold**	The date the wrestler achieved the Triple Crown

Champion	Primary championship	Secondary championship	Tag team championship
Champion	World's Heavyweight	National Heavyweight	World Tag Team
Jax Dane	**August 29, 2015**	February 6, 2015	November 9, 2013 (with Rob Conway)
Trevor Murdoch	August 29, 2021	September 29, 2020	**June 1, 2024** (with Knox)
Thom Latimer	**August 31, 2024**	March 2, 2024	September 7, 2019 (with Royce Isaacs)

==== List of NWA Women's Triple Crown winners ====
The National Wrestling Alliance (NWA) Women's Triple Crown consists of the NWA World Women's Championship, the NWA World Women's Tag Team Championship, and the NWA World Women's Television Championship. Kenzie Paige is the first NWA Women's Triple Crown Champion.

Text
Dates in **bold**	The date the wrestler achieved the Triple Crown

Champion	Primary championship	Secondary championship	Tag team championship
Champion	World Women's	World Women's Television	World Women's Tag Team
Kenzie Paige	**August 27, 2023**	April 7, 2023	June 11, 2022 (with Ella Envy)
Tiffany Nieves	**April 4, 2026**	February 2, 2025	March 22, 2025 (with Valentina Rossi)

=== New Japan Pro-Wrestling ===
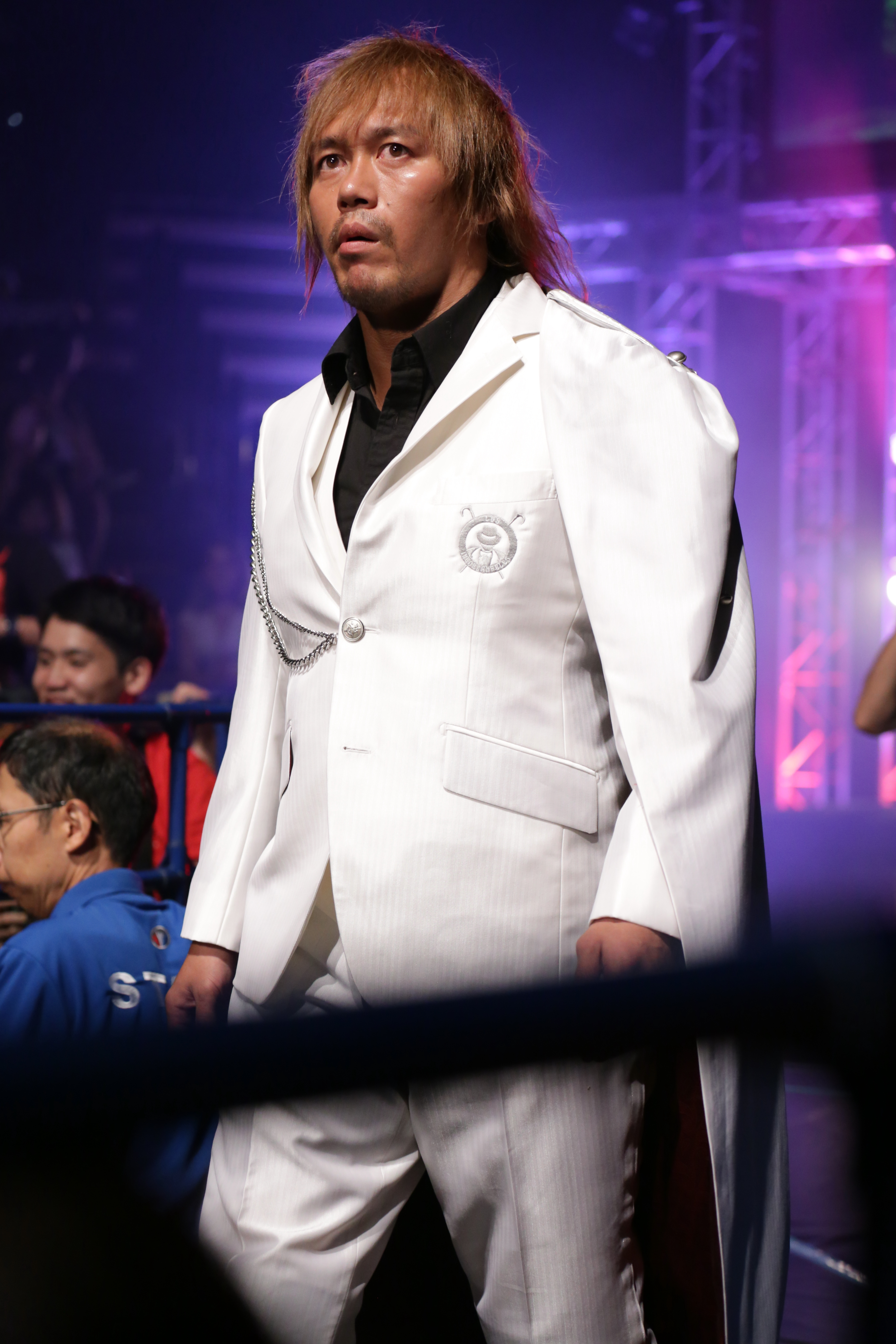
Tetsuya Naito, the first NJPW Triple Crown winner

The New Japan Pro-Wrestling Triple Crown consisted of the IWGP Heavyweight Championship, the IWGP Intercontinental Championship and the NEVER Openweight Championship. The NJPW Triple Crown is unique as it consists of three singles championships, instead of a tag team championship in addition to two singles.

The IWGP Heavyweight and Intercontinental championships were retired in 2021 to create the IWGP World Heavyweight Championship, although it was ultimately reverted into the Heavyweight title in 2026, with its champions retroactively being considered part of the original's lineage. It is unknown if NJPW considers the IWGP United States Heavyweight Championship as a part of the accolade (although it is considered part of their Grand Slam), or the IWGP Global Heavyweight Championship or NJPW World Television Championship that succeeded it.

==== List of New Japan Pro-Wrestling Triple Crown winners ====
Text
Dates in **bold**	The date the wrestler achieved the Triple Crown
Names in **bold**	Indicates the wrestler is also a Grand Slam Champion

Champion	Primary championship	Secondary championship	Tertiary championship
Champion	IWGP Heavyweight	IWGP Intercontinental	NEVER Openweight
Tetsuya Naito	April 10, 2016	**September 25, 2016**	September 29, 2013
Evil	**July 12, 2020**	**July 12, 2020**	November 5, 2016
Kota Ibushi	**January 4, 2021**	April 6, 2019	December 9, 2018
**Hiroshi Tanahashi**	July 17, 2006	January 4, 2014	**January 30, 2021**
**Will Ospreay**	**April 4, 2021**	**April 4, 2021**	January 4, 2019
**Jay White**	February 11, 2019	September 22, 2019	**May 3, 2021**
Shingo Takagi	**June 7, 2021**	**June 7, 2021**	February 1, 2020
Hirooki Goto	**February 11, 2025**	February 12, 2012	January 4, 2017
Konosuke Takeshita	**October 13, 2025**	**October 13, 2025**	January 4, 2025

=== Ring of Honor ===
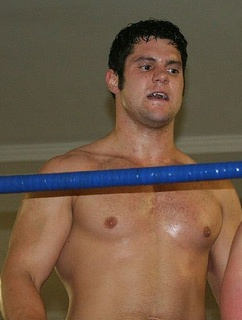
Eddie Edwards, the first ROH Triple Crown winner and the first wrestler to win both the ROH and TNA Triple Crown

The Ring of Honor (ROH) Triple Crown originally was defined as the ROH World Championship, the ROH World Tag Team Championship, and the ROH World Television Championship. It was later amended so that the World Championship and any combination of the Television, Tag Team or ROH Pure Championship would qualify. The ROH World Six Man Tag Team Championship is not part of the Triple Crown, but when added to the Triple Crown it forms the ROH Grand Slam.

Eddie Edwards completed the ROH Triple Crown the fastest, and Samoa Joe completed it in the longest amount of time. Edwards completed it in 709 days, between April 2009 and March 2011, while Samoa Joe completed it in 6,962 days (19 years and 22 days), first winning the ROH World Championship in March 2003, and finally winning the ROH World Television Championship in April 2022.

==== List of ROH Triple Crown winners ====
Text
Dates in **bold**	The date the wrestler achieved the Triple Crown
Names in **bold**	Indicates the wrestler is also a Grand Slam Champion
Dates in italics	The wrestler has won that title, but it does not contribute to their Triple Crown because they had already won the Triple Crown or they had already won a title at that same level
Colors
	Won all Triple Crown eligible titles

Champion	Primary championship	Secondary championship (with tag team or tertiary)	Tag team championship (with secondary or tertiary)	Tertiary championship (with secondary or tag team)
Champion	World	World Television	World Tag Team	Pure
Eddie Edwards	**March 19, 2011**	March 5, 2010	April 10, 2009 (with Davey Richards)	
Roderick Strong	September 11, 2010	**March 31, 2012**	December 12, 2005 (with Austin Aries)	
**Jay Lethal**	**June 19, 2015**	August 13, 2011	December 13, 2019 (with Jonathan Gresham)	March 5, 2005
**Christopher Daniels**	**March 10, 2017**	December 10, 2010	September 21, 2002 (with Donovan Morgan)	
**Matt Taven**	**April 6, 2019**	March 2, 2013	September 18, 2015 (with Michael Bennett)	
Jonathan Gresham	**December 11, 2021**		December 13, 2019 (with Jay Lethal)	October 30, 2020
Samoa Joe	March 22, 2003	**April 13, 2022**		May 7, 2005
Adam Cole	September 20, 2013	June 29, 2012	**August 27, 2023** (with MJF)	

=== World Championship Wrestling ===
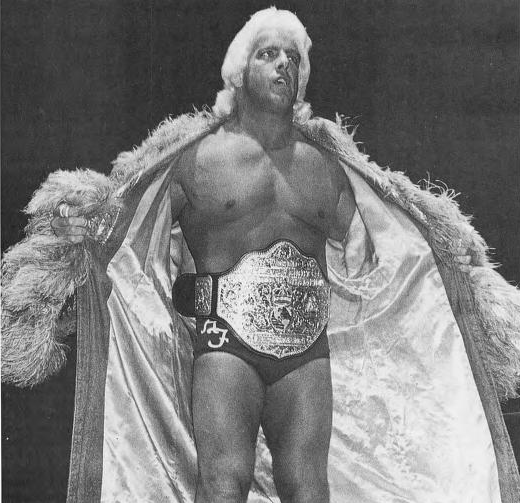
Ric Flair, the first WCW Triple Crown winner (also a WWE Triple Crown winner, one of four to have completed both).

The World Championship Wrestling (WCW) Triple Crown consisted of the WCW World Heavyweight Championship, the WCW United States Heavyweight Championship (now the WWE United States Championship) and the WCW World Tag Team Championship.

When Bret Hart and Goldberg won the WCW World Tag Team Championship, they both became Triple Crown winners at the same time. Chris Benoit completed the WCW Triple Crown the fastest, completing it in 309 days between March 1999 and January 2000.

==== List of WCW Triple Crown winners ====
Text
Dates in **bold**	The date the wrestler achieved the Triple Crown

Champion	Primary championship	Secondary championship	Tag team championship
Champion	World Heavyweight	United States Heavyweight	World Tag Team
Ric Flair	**January 11, 1991**	July 29, 1977	December 26, 1976 (with Greg Valentine)
Lex Luger	**July 14, 1991**	July 11, 1987	March 27, 1988 (with Barry Windham)
Sting	February 29, 1992	August 25, 1991	**January 22, 1996** (with Lex Luger)
Diamond Dallas Page	April 11, 1999	December 28, 1997	**May 31, 1999** (with Bam Bam Bigelow)
Goldberg	July 6, 1998	April 20, 1998	**December 7, 1999** (with Bret Hart)
Bret Hart	November 21, 1999	July 20, 1998	**December 7, 1999** (with Goldberg)
Chris Benoit	**January 16, 2000**	August 9, 1999	March 14, 1999 (with Dean Malenko)
Scott Steiner	**November 26, 2000**	April 11, 1999	November 1, 1989 (with Rick Steiner)
Booker T	July 9, 2000	**March 18, 2001**	May 3, 1995 (with Stevie Ray)

=== WWE ===
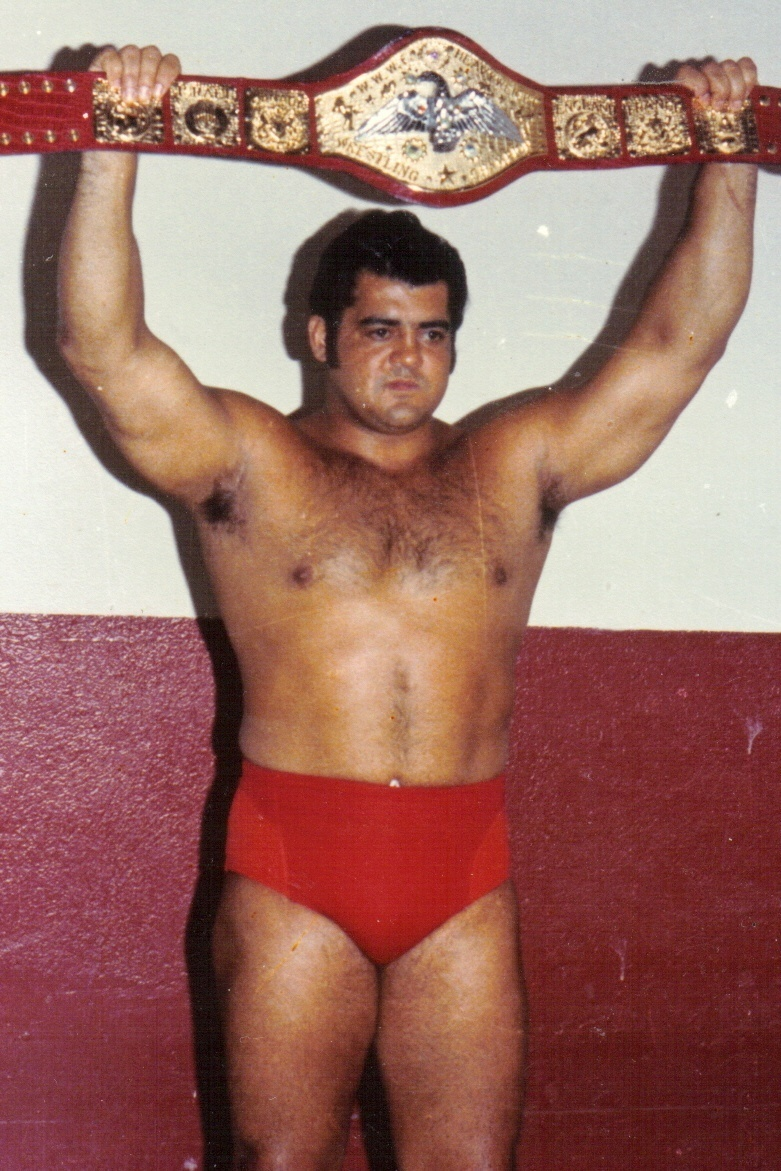
Pedro Morales, the first WWE Triple Crown winner

In WWE (formerly known as the World Wide Wrestling Federation/WWWF and World Wrestling Federation/WWF), the term Triple Crown Champion has traditionally been used to describe a wrestler who has won the WWE Championship, the Intercontinental Championship, and the original World Tag Team Championship. For a span of nearly 18 years, from 1979 up through 1997, these were the only three championships of the company, and a wrestler who won all three championships (not necessarily concurrently) was considered a "Triple Crown Champion". Until the 1990s, the accomplishment was extremely rare, with Pedro Morales remaining the sole Triple Crown winner for more than a decade.

Following the first brand extension between 2002 and 2011, the now defunct World Heavyweight Championship and the WWE Tag Team Championship became alternate titles that could compose part of WWE's Triple Crown. After the respective unifications of the two world championships and two tag team championships, the only three eligible Triple Crown championships of WWE became the WWE Championship, Intercontinental Championship, and WWE Tag Team Championship (later called the Raw Tag Team Championship, now the World Tag Team Championship). A total of nine men have won all five eligible championships; Shawn Michaels, Triple H, Kane, Chris Jericho, Edge, Randy Orton, Jeff Hardy, Big Show and John Cena.

In July 2016, a second brand extension period began and two new titles were introduced: the Universal Championship and the SmackDown Tag Team Championship (now known as the WWE Tag Team Championship). In January 2017, these were designated as acceptable substitutes for their counterpart titles in the Grand Slam, but they are not acceptable substitutes for the Triple Crown. At WrestleMania 36, Braun Strowman won the Universal Championship after previously holding the Intercontinental and Raw Tag Team Championships, but WWE did not recognize him as a Triple Crown winner. Since then, Kevin Owens and Finn Bálor have also completed WWE's Grand Slam with the Universal Championship, but neither are recognized as a Triple Crown winner.

In May 2023, WWE introduced a new version of the World Heavyweight Championship, the lineage of which does not share with the previous World Heavyweight Championship that was retired in 2013. It has not been confirmed if this title would serve as an acceptable substitute for the Triple Crown.

CM Punk holds the record for completing the Triple Crown in the shortest amount of time between the first and third title. It took him 203 days between June 2008 and January 2009. John Cena holds the record for the most time between the first and third title. It took him 7,526 days between April 3, 2005, and November 10, 2025.

==== List of WWE Triple Crown winners ====
The following is a list of WWE Triple Crown winners with dates indicating the wrestler's first or only reign with the respective championship.

Text
Dates in **bold**	The date the wrestler achieved the Triple Crown
Names in **bold**	Indicates the wrestler is also a Grand Slam Champion
Championships in italics	Indicates the title is an alternate title from the original definition of the Triple Crown
Dates in italics	The wrestler has won that title, but it does not contribute to their Triple Crown because they had already won the Triple Crown or they had already won a title at that same level
Names in italics	Indicates the wrestler is a Grand Slam Champion under both formats
-	Indicates future reigns are impossible due to retirement, death or title discontinuation
Colors
	Won all Triple Crown eligible titles
	Won title as a member of the Raw brand
	Won title as a member of the SmackDown brand
	Won title as a member of the ECW brand
	Won title before the brand extension, during its discontinuation or as a free agent

Champion	Primary championships (either needed)		Secondary championship	Tag team championships (either needed)	
Champion	WWE	World Heavyweight original	Intercontinental	World Tag Team original	WWE/Raw/World Tag Team current
Pedro Morales	February 8, 1971	-	**December 8, 1980**	August 9, 1980 (with Bob Backlund)	-
Bret Hart	**October 12, 1992**	-	August 26, 1991	January 26, 1987 (with Jim Neidhart)	-
Diesel	**November 26, 1994**	-	April 13, 1994	August 28, 1994 (with Shawn Michaels)	-
**Shawn Michaels**	**March 31, 1996**	November 17, 2002	October 27, 1992	August 28, 1994 (with Diesel)	December 13, 2009 (with Triple H)
Stone Cold Steve Austin	**March 29, 1998**	-	August 3, 1997	May 26, 1997 (with Shawn Michaels)	-
The Rock	November 15, 1998	-	February 13, 1997	**August 30, 1999** (with Mankind)	-
**Triple H**	August 23, 1999	September 2, 2002	October 21, 1996	**April 29, 2001** (with Stone Cold Steve Austin)	December 13, 2009 (with Shawn Michaels)
**Kane**	June 28, 1998	July 18, 2010	**May 20, 2001**	July 13, 1998 (with Mankind)	April 19, 2011 (with Big Show)
**Chris Jericho**	**December 9, 2001**	September 7, 2008	December 12, 1999	May 21, 2001 (with Chris Benoit)	June 28, 2009 (with Edge)
**Kurt Angle**	October 22, 2000	January 10, 2006	February 27, 2000	-	**October 20, 2002** (with Chris Benoit)
**Eddie Guerrero**	**February 15, 2004**	-	September 5, 2000	-	November 17, 2002 (with Chavo Guerrero Jr.)
Chris Benoit	-	**March 14, 2004**	April 2, 2000	May 21, 2001 (with Chris Jericho)	October 20, 2002 (with Kurt Angle)
Ric Flair	January 19, 1992	-	**September 18, 2005**	December 14, 2003 (with Batista)	-
**Edge**	**January 8, 2006**	May 8, 2007	July 24, 1999	April 2, 2000 (with Christian)	November 5, 2002 (with Rey Mysterio)
**Rob Van Dam**	**June 11, 2006**	-	March 17, 2002	March 31, 2003 (with Kane)	December 7, 2004 (with Rey Mysterio)
**Booker T**	-	**July 23, 2006**	July 7, 2003	November 1, 2001 (with Test)	-
**Randy Orton**	October 7, 2007	August 15, 2004	December 14, 2003	**November 13, 2006** (with Edge)	August 21, 2021 (with Riddle)
**Jeff Hardy**	**December 14, 2008**	June 7, 2009	April 10, 2001	June 29, 1999 (with Matt Hardy)	April 2, 2017 (with Matt Hardy)
CM Punk	July 17, 2011	June 30, 2008	**January 19, 2009**	October 27, 2008 (with Kofi Kingston)	
**John Bradshaw Layfield**	June 27, 2004	-	**March 9, 2009**	May 25, 1999 (with Faarooq)	-
**Rey Mysterio**	July 25, 2011	April 2, 2006	**April 5, 2009**	-	November 5, 2002 (with Edge)
Dolph Ziggler		**February 15, 2011**	July 28, 2010	April 3, 2006 (with The Spirit Squad)	September 3, 2018 (with Drew McIntyre)
**Christian**		**May 1, 2011**	September 23, 2001	April 2, 2000 (with Edge)	
**Big Show**	November 14, 1999	December 18, 2011	**April 1, 2012**	August 22, 1999 (with The Undertaker)	July 26, 2009 (with Chris Jericho)
**The Miz**	November 22, 2010	-	**July 23, 2012**	December 13, 2008 (with John Morrison)	November 16, 2007 (with John Morrison)
**Daniel Bryan**	August 18, 2013	December 18, 2011	**March 29, 2015**	-	September 16, 2012 (with Kane)
**Dean Ambrose**	June 19, 2016	-	December 13, 2015	-	**August 20, 2017** (with Seth Rollins)
**Roman Reigns**	November 22, 2015	-	**November 20, 2017**	-	May 19, 2013 (with Seth Rollins)
**Seth Rollins**	March 29, 2015	-	**April 8, 2018**	-	May 19, 2013 (with Roman Reigns)
**Kofi Kingston**	**April 7, 2019**	-	June 29, 2008	October 27, 2008 (with CM Punk)	August 22, 2011 (with Evan Bourne)
Drew McIntyre	**March 26, 2020**	-	December 13, 2009	-	September 19, 2010 (with Cody Rhodes)
**AJ Styles**	September 11, 2016	-	June 8, 2020	-	**April 10, 2021** (with Omos)
Big E	**September 13, 2021**	-	November 18, 2013	-	April 26, 2015 (with Kofi Kingston and Xavier Woods)
Cody Rhodes	**April 7, 2024**	-	August 9, 2011	December 10, 2007 (with Hardcore Holly)	September 19, 2010 (with Drew McIntyre)
**John Cena**	April 3, 2005	November 23, 2008	**November 10, 2025**	January 29, 2007 (with Shawn Michaels)	October 24, 2010 (with David Otunga)
**Sami Zayn**	**June 27, 2026**	-	March 8, 2020	-	April 1, 2023 (with Kevin Owens)

==== List of WWE Women's Triple Crown winners ====
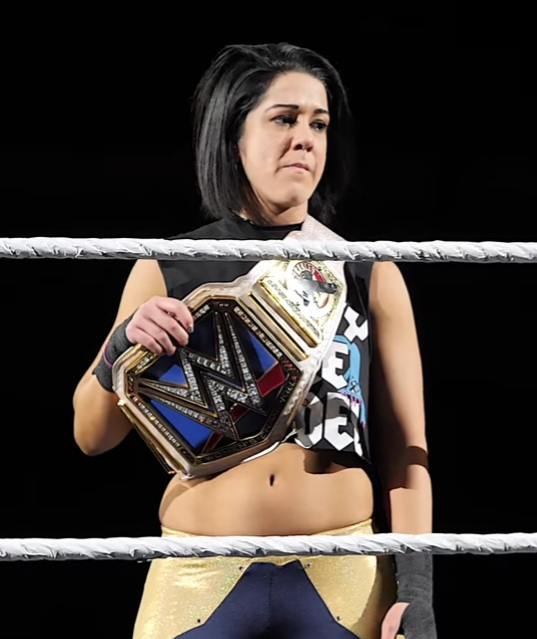
Bayley was the first Women's Triple Crown winner

On May 22, 2019, a women's Triple Crown was established, consisting of the WWE Women's Championship (previously known as the Raw Women's Championship), Women's World Championship (previously known as the SmackDown Women's Championship), and the WWE Women's Tag Team Championship. With the announcement, Bayley, who had won the SmackDown Women's Championship for the first time three days prior, was recognized as the inaugural WWE Women's Triple Crown Champion after having previously held the Raw Women's and Women's Tag Team championships.

In 2024, WWE created two women mid-card titles–the WWE Women's United States Championship and the WWE Women's Intercontinental Championship. WWE have yet to announce if the two titles will make the Triple Crown.

Bayley has been referred to as a Grand Slam Champion after her win, having also held the NXT Women's Championship. Asuka has to date completed the Women's Triple Crown the fastest, with 486 days between her first qualifying title win and Triple Crown achieving win.

Text
Dates in **bold**	The date the wrestler achieved the Triple Crown
Names in **bold**	Indicates the wrestler is also a Grand Slam Champion
Colors
	Won title as a member of the Raw brand
	Won title as a member of the SmackDown brand
	Won title when the brand extension was not in effect

Champion	Singles championships (both needed)		Tag team championship
Champion	Raw/WWE Women's	SmackDown/ Women's World	Women's Tag Team
**Bayley**	February 13, 2017	**May 19, 2019**	February 17, 2019 (with Sasha Banks)
Alexa Bliss	April 30, 2017	December 4, 2016	**August 5, 2019** (with Nikki Cross)
**Asuka**	**April 15, 2020**	December 16, 2018	October 6, 2019 (with Kairi Sane)
**Sasha Banks**	July 25, 2016	**October 25, 2020**	February 17, 2019 (with Bayley)
**Charlotte Flair**	April 3, 2016	November 14, 2017	**December 20, 2020** (with Asuka)
**Becky Lynch**	April 8, 2019	September 11, 2016	**February 27, 2023** (with Lita)
**Rhea Ripley**	April 11, 2021	**April 1, 2023**	September 20, 2021 (with Nikki A.S.H.)
Ronda Rousey	August 19, 2018	May 8, 2022	**May 29, 2023** (with Shayna Baszler)
Bianca Belair	April 2, 2022	April 10, 2021	**May 4, 2024** (with Jade Cargill)
**Iyo Sky**	August 5, 2023	**March 3, 2025**	September 12, 2022 (with Dakota Kai)

==== List of WWE Tag Team Triple Crown winners ====
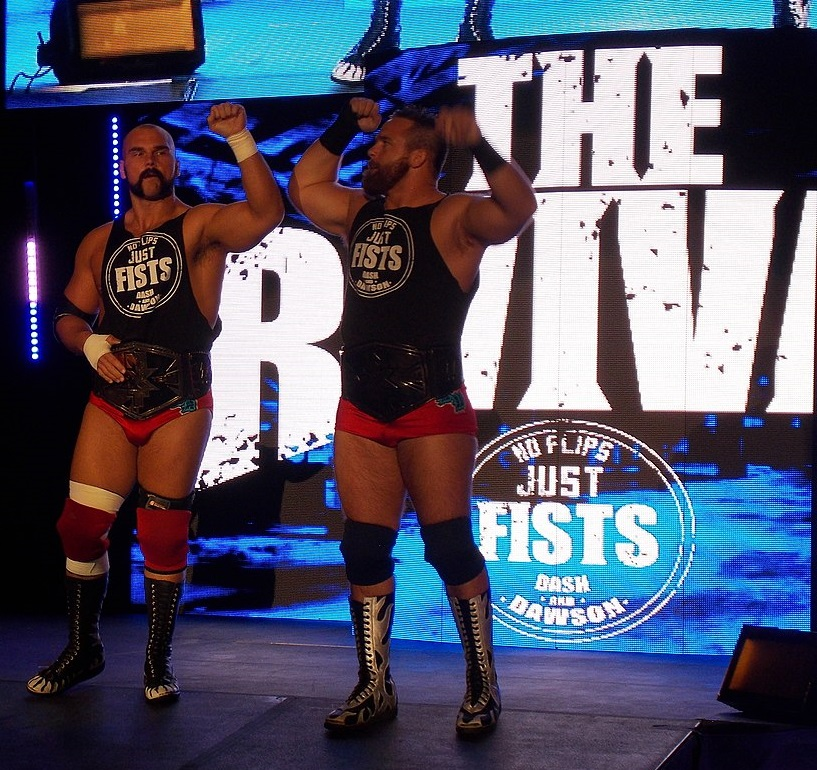
The Revival (Scott Dawson and Dash Wilder) are the first WWE Tag Team Triple Crown winners

Since 2019, WWE has recognized the winners of all three tag team championships currently available (WWE, World and, since 2013, NXT) as Tag Team Triple Crown winners.

The Revival were the first team to complete the Tag Team Triple crown by winning the SmackDown Tag Team Championships in September 2019. The Street Profits has to date completed the Men's Tag Team Triple Crown the fastest, with 499 days between their first qualifying title win and Triple Crown achieving win. The Hardy Boyz became the first tag team to complete the tag team version of the WWE Triple Crown while not being under contract with WWE, being a part of Total Nonstop Action Wrestling (TNA) at the time. However they also have the longest time between their first qualifying title win and Triple Crown achieving win at 3,110 days.

In the list below, dates indicate the wrestler's first reign with the respective championship. Only tag teams who have completed the triple crown are included. Individuals such as Jason Jordan and Chad Gable, who won the NXT and SmackDown Tag Team Championships together but won the Raw Tag Team Championship separately, are excluded.

Text
Dates in **bold**	The date the team achieved the Triple Crown
Names in italics	Indicates the wrestler is also a Triple Crown Champion as a singles wrestler
Colors
	Won title as members of the Raw brand
	Won title as members of the SmackDown brand
	Won title as members of the NXT brand
	Won title while not signed with WWE
	Won title when the brand extension was not in effect or when not affiliated with any brand

Champions	Tag team championships (all three needed)		
Champions	Raw/World Tag Team	SmackDown/WWE Tag Team	NXT
The Revival (Scott Dawson and Dash Wilder)	February 11, 2019	**September 15, 2019**	October 22, 2015
The Street Profits (Angelo Dawkins and Montez Ford)	March 2, 2020	**October 12, 2020**	June 1, 2019
The New Day (Kofi Kingston and Xavier Woods)	April 26, 2015 (with Big E)	July 23, 2017 (with Big E)	**December 10, 2022**
The Hardy Boyz (Matt Hardy and Jeff Hardy)	April 2, 2017	April 9, 2019	**October 7, 2025**

==== List of WWE NXT Triple Crown winners ====
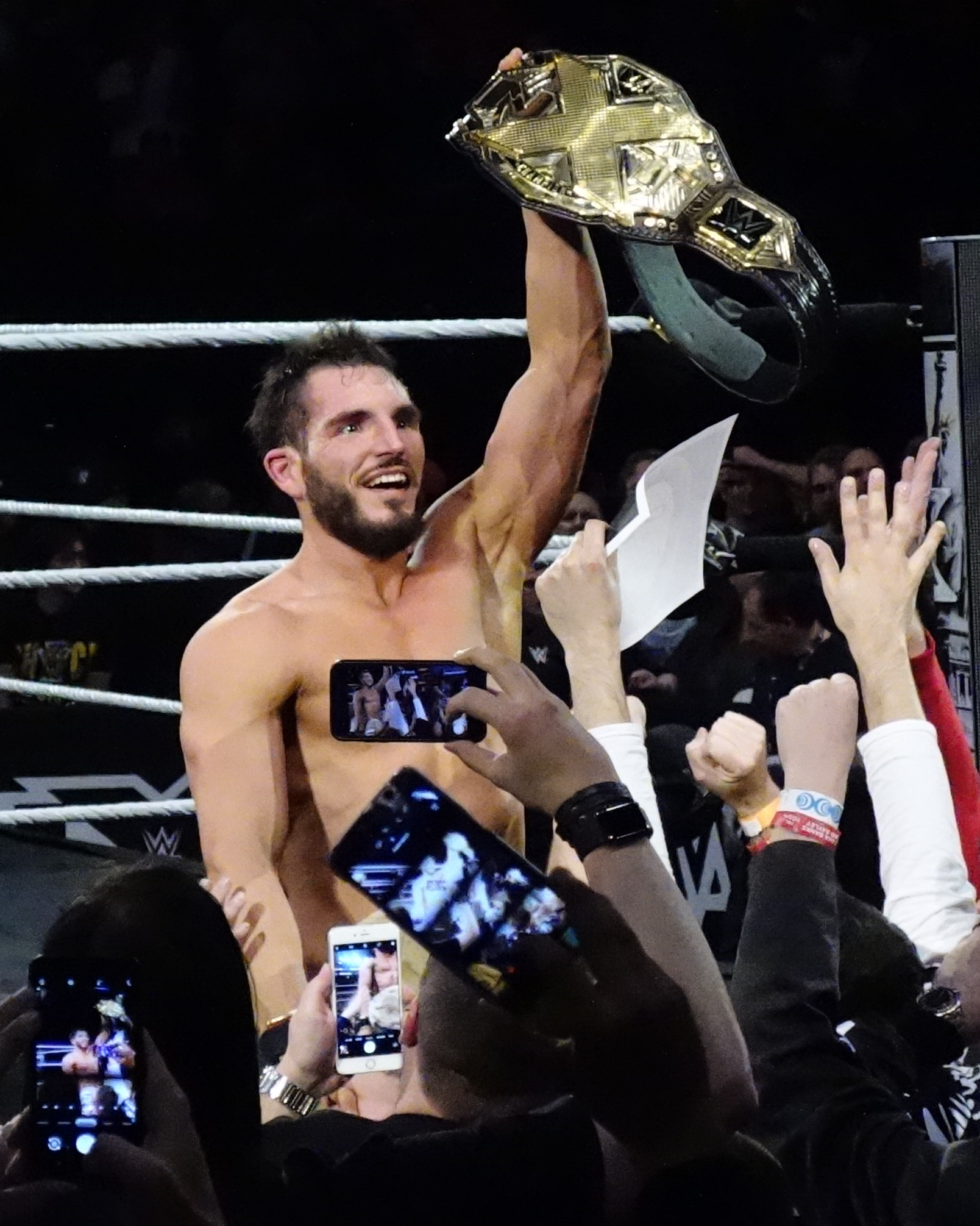
Gargano with the NXT Championship

WWE's NXT Triple Crown consists of the NXT Championship, NXT North American Championship, and NXT Tag Team Championship. The NXT brand was originally established as a developmental territory for WWE's main roster in 2012, was elevated to the third global brand in 2019, but after being rebooted as NXT 2.0 in 2021, was returned to its original status as a developmental brand.

Johnny Gargano became the first to be recognized as the NXT Triple Crown Champion, winning his first NXT Championship, and having previously held the NXT North American and NXT Tag Team championships.

Adam Cole has completed the NXT Triple Crown the fastest, doing so within 420 days, between April 2018 and June 2019.

Text
Dates in **bold**	The date the wrestler achieved the Triple Crown
Names in **bold**	Indicates the wrestler is also a Grand Slam Champion

Champion	Primary championship	Secondary championship	Tag team championship
Champion	NXT	North American	Tag Team
Johnny Gargano	**April 5, 2019**	January 26, 2019	November 19, 2016 (with Tommaso Ciampa)
Adam Cole	**June 1, 2019**	April 7, 2018	April 7, 2018 (with Bobby Fish, Kyle O'Reilly, and Roderick Strong) (Note: Fish and O'Reilly originally won the title as a duo, but Cole also became recognized as champion under the Freebird Rule after Fish suffered an injury. Cole became recognized as champion at NXT TakeOver: New Orleans when he defended the titles with O'Reilly. Strong was later also recognized as champion on April 11, 2018.)
**Tony D'Angelo**	**April 4, 2026**	October 8, 2024	July 30, 2023 (with Channing "Stacks" Lorenzo)

==== List of WWE NXT UK Triple Crown winners ====
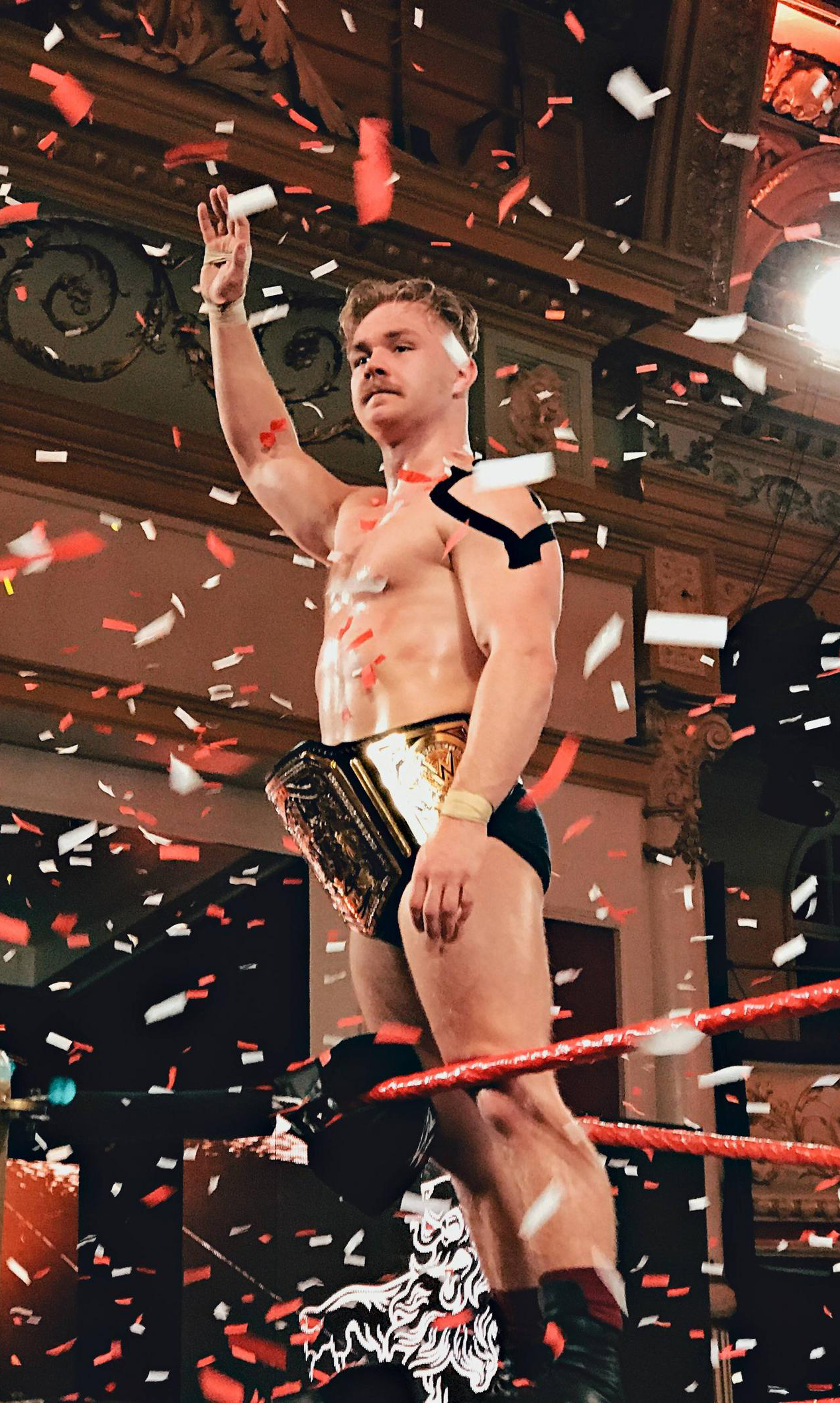
Bate is the only NXT UK Triple Crown winner

The NXT UK Triple Crown consisted of the NXT United Kingdom Championship, the NXT UK Heritage Cup, and the NXT UK Tag Team Championship. Due to the closure of NXT UK and the retirement of all but one of its titles in September 2022, Tyler Bate was the only wrestler to achieve the feat, completing it on December 9, 2021, after winning the tag team title with Trent Seven. He previously became the first UK Champion in 2017 (the title was then known as the WWE United Kingdom Championship) and later won the Heritage Cup in May 2021.

Text
Dates in **bold**	The date the wrestler achieved the Triple Crown

Champion	Primary championship	Secondary championship	Tag team championship
Champion	NXT UK	Heritage Cup	Tag Team
Tyler Bate	January 15, 2017	May 20, 2021	**December 9, 2021** (with Trent Seven)

== Regional/independent promotions ==
=== All American Wrestling ===
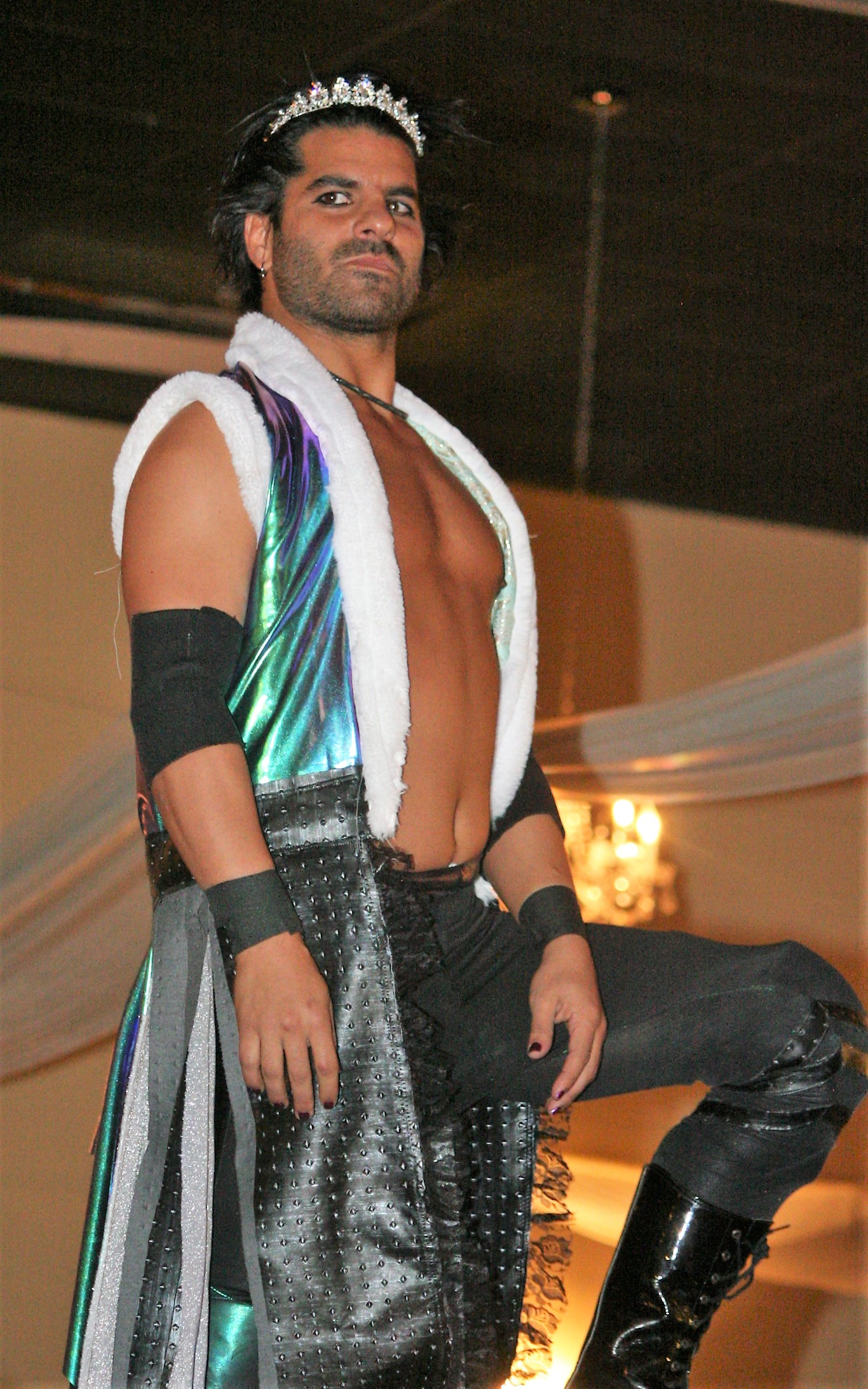
Jimmy Jacobs, the first AAW Triple Crown Champion

All American Wrestling (AAW) is an independent regional promotion. Their version consists of the AAW Heavyweight Championship, the AAW Heritage Championship and the AAW Tag Team Championship.

==== List of AAW Triple Crown winners ====
Text
Dates in **bold**	The date the wrestler achieved the Triple Crown

Champion	Primary championship	Secondary championship	Tag team championship
Champion	Heavyweight	Heritage	Tag Team
Jimmy Jacobs	September 5, 2009	September 23, 2006	**February 19, 2010** (with Tyler Black)
Shane Hollister	**June 28, 2013**	September 24, 2010	June 21, 2008 (with Bryce Benjamin)
Michael Elgin	September 21, 2012	October 28, 2011	**December 28, 2013** (with Ethan Page)
Penta el 0M	July 23, 2016	March 17, 2017	**February 8, 2019** (with Rey Fénix)
ACH	February 3, 2018	March 1, 2013	**July 15, 2022** (with Jah-C)
Jake Something	**September 1, 2022**	May 11, 2019	September 2, 2021 (with Stallion Rogers)
Trevor Lee	**August 9, 2025**	February 17, 2018	November 26, 2016 (with Andrew Everett)

=== Attack! Championship Wrestling ===
Attack! Pro Wrestling (ATTACK!) is a British wrestling promotion primarily based in Cardiff, Wales, but does events throughout England and Wales. Their version consists of the ATTACK! Championship, the ATTACK! Tag Team Championship, and ATTACK! 24/7 Championship.

==== List of Attack! Triple Crown winners ====
Text
Dates in **bold**	The date the wrestler achieved the Triple Crown

Champion	Primary championship	Secondary championship	Tag team championship
Champion	ATTACK! Championship	ATTACK! 24/7 Championship	ATTACK! Tag Team Championship
James Ellis	May 18, 2025	April 6, 2024	**September 5, 2026** (with Aaron McRae)

=== Chaotic Wrestling ===
Chaotic Wrestling is an independent regional promotion. Their version consists of the Chaotic Wrestling Heavyweight Championship, the Chaotic Wrestling New England Championship and the Chaotic Wrestling Tag Team Championship.

==== List of Chaotic Triple Crown winners ====
Text
Dates in **bold**	The date the wrestler achieved the Triple Crown

Champion	Primary championship	Secondary championship	Tag team championship
Champion	CW Heavyweight	CW New England	CW Tag Team
Luis Ortiz	**December 14, 2001**	February 23, 2001	August 10, 2001 (with Little Guido)
R. J. Brewer	**August 16, 2002**	September 7, 2001	December 14, 2001 (with Vince Vicallo)
Brian Black	**March 18, 2005**	April 30, 2004	August 23, 2003 (with The Mighty Mini)
Arch Kincaid	March 12, 2004	October 4, 2003	**December 9, 2005** (with Max Bauer)
Brian Milonas	**February 2, 2007**	October 29, 2004	December 5, 2003 (with Peter Mulloy)
Alex Arion	**June 6, 2008**	October 20, 2007	March 30, 2007 (with Max Bauer)
Mikaze	**September 9, 2011**	October 2, 2010	October 20, 2006 (with Jason Blade)
Brian Fury	**February 24, 2012**	February 23, 2007	February 6, 2009 (with Mikaze)
Julian Starr	**September 11, 2015**	March 12, 2010	November 12, 2010 (with Matt Logan)
Chase Del Monte	February 6, 2009	June 24, 2005	**January 13, 2017** (with Bryan Logan and Matt Logan)
Donovan Dijak	October 24, 2014	**August 4, 2017**	December 16, 2016 (with Mikey Webb)
Christian Casanova	**March 29, 2019**	March 17, 2017	March 16, 2018 (with Triplelicious)
Anthony Greene	**July 19, 2019**	August 3, 2018	March 17, 2017 (with Cam Zagami)
Mike Verna	December 30, 2020	February 3, 2017	**August 27, 2021** (with The Unit)

=== Combat Zone Wrestling ===
Combat Zone Wrestling (CZW) is an independent regional promotion. Their version consists of the CZW World Heavyweight Championship, the CZW World Tag Team Championship, CZW Wired Championship and CZW World Junior Heavyweight Championship.

==== List of CZW Triple Crown winners ====
Text
Dates in **bold**	The date the wrestler achieved the Triple Crown
-	Indicates future reigns are impossible due to retirement or title discontinuation

Champion	Primary championship	Secondary championships		Tag team championship
Champion	World Heavyweight	Wired	World Junior Heavyweight	World Tag Team
Justice Pain	**September 9, 2000**	-	April 3, 1999	November 11, 1999 (No partner)
Ruckus	**February 5, 2005**		February 12, 2001	June 12, 2004 (with Sabian)
Drake Younger	July 12, 2008	-	**May 5, 2012**	April 10, 2010 (with Eddie Kingston)
Scotty Vortekz	**February 4, 2012**		April 7, 2007	February 9, 2008 (with Dustin Lee)
Drew Gulak	**August 10, 2013**	April 10, 2010	-	September 8, 2007 (with Andy Sumner)
Devon Moore	April 9, 2011	**January 11, 2014**	-	August 11, 2012 (with Danny Havoc and Lucky 13)
Sozio	**October 18, 2014**	-	March 11, 2006	October 13, 2007 (with Derek Frazier)
BLK Jeez	**December 13, 2014**		April 2, 2005	June 12, 2004 (with Ruckus)

=== Explosive Pro Wrestling ===
Explosive Pro Wrestling (EPW) is an Australian independent regional promotion. Their version consists of the EPW Heavyweight Championship, the EPW Tag Team Championship, and the EPW Coastal Championship.

==== List of EPW Triple Crown winners ====
Text
Dates in **bold**	The date the wrestler achieved the Triple Crown
Names in **bold**	Indicates the wrestler is also a Grand Slam Champion

Champion	Primary championship	Secondary championship	Tag team championship
Champion	Heavyweight	Coastal	Tag Team
**Gavin McGavin**	**August 25, 2018**	November 19, 2016	March 7, 2015 (with Mike Massive)
Marcius Pitt	April 10, 2011	**May 25, 2019**	February 16, 2008 (with Michael Morleone)
Davis Storm	May 11, 2002	**March 7, 2020**	October 1, 2005 (with Nate Dooley)
Taylor King	**December 16, 2023**	June 11, 2022	December 5, 2020 (with Jack Edwards and Tipene)

=== Full Impact Pro ===
Full Impact Pro (FIP) is an independent regional promotion. Their version consists of the FIP World Heavyweight Championship, the FIP Florida Heritage Championship and the FIP Tag Team Championship.

==== List of FIP Triple Crown winners ====
Text
Dates in **bold**	The date the wrestler achieved the Triple Crown

Champion	Primary championship	Secondary championship	Tag team championship
Champion	World Heavyweight	Florida Heritage	Tag Team
Erick Stevens	December 30, 2007	March 10, 2007	**December 20, 2008** (with Roderick Strong)
Jon Davis	February 1, 2013	**April 2, 2017**	July 31, 2010 (with Kory Chavis)

=== Ice Ribbon ===
Ice Ribbon (アイスリボン, Aisuribon) is a joshi puroresu (women's professional wrestling) promotion. Their version consists of the ICE×60/ICE×∞ Championship, the International Ribbon Tag Team Championship and the Triangle Ribbon Championship.

==== List of Ice Ribbon Triple Crown winners ====
Text
Dates in **bold**	The date the wrestler achieved the Triple Crown
Names in **bold**	indicates the wrestler is also a Grand Slam Champion

Champion	Primary championship	Secondary championship	Tag team championship
Champion	ICE×60/ICE×∞	Triangle Ribbon	International Ribbon Tag Team
Riho	**April 3, 2010**	November 28, 2009	October 24, 2008 (with Yuki Sato)
Miyako Matsumoto	March 21, 2010	March 22, 2010	**May 3, 2010** (with Jun Kasai)
**Tsukasa Fujimoto**	January 4, 2010	December 11, 2010	**December 23, 2010** (with Hikaru Shida)
Maya Yukihi	December 31, 2018	**May 1, 2019**	October 29, 2017 (with Risa Sera)
Satsuki Totoro	**March 19, 2023**	August 9, 2021	May 4, 2022 (with Yuna Manase)
Makoto	August 23, 2009	**October 25, 2025**	February 1, 2008 (with Etsuko Mita)
**Hikari Minami**	July 19, 2010	July 26, 2026	**August 30, 2026** (with Manami Katsu)

=== Insane Championship Wrestling ===
Insane Championship Wrestling (ICW) is a British wrestling promotion based in Glasgow, Scotland. Their version consists of the ICW World Heavyweight Championship, the ICW Tag Team Championship, and ICW Zero-G Championship.

==== List of ICW Triple Crown winners ====
Text
Dates in **bold**	The date the wrestler achieved the Triple Crown

Champion	Primary championship	Secondary championship	Tag team championship
Champion	World Heavyweight	Zero-G	Tag Team
BT Gunn	June 5, 2010	**July 30, 2017**	October 23, 2013 (with Chris Renfrew)
Stevie Boy	**April 29, 2018**	April 19, 2015	March 3, 2013 (with Davey Boy)
Kez Evans	November 21, 2021	April 10, 2021	**March 23, 2026** (with BT Gunn)
Mark Coffey	**May 24, 2026**	September 7, 2013	November 2, 2014 (with Jackie Polo)

=== Melbourne City Wrestling ===
Melbourne City Wrestling (MCW) is an Australian independent professional wrestling promotion founded in October 2010, in Melbourne, Victoria, Australia. Their version consists of the MCW Heavyweight Championship, the MCW Tag Team Championship, and MCW Intercommonwealth Championship.

==== List of MCW Triple Crown winners ====
Text
Dates in **bold**	The date the wrestler achieved the Triple Crown

Champion	Primary championship	Secondary championship	Tag team championship
Champion	Heavyweight	Intercommonwealth	Tag Team
Dowie James	**December 2, 2016**	August 8, 2015	November 30, 2013 (with Adam Brooks)
Gino Gambino	**July 15, 2017**	August 13, 2016	March 12, 2016 (with JXT)
Jonah Rock	**August 5, 2017**	May 14, 2016	April 11, 2015 (with Hartley Jackson)
Slex	April 16, 2011	**February 24, 2018**	May 14, 2016 (with Marcius Pitt)
Adam Brooks	**November 9, 2019**	February 13, 2016	November 30, 2013 (with Dowie James)
Caveman Ugg	**December 8, 2024**	February 1, 2020	December 16, 2017 (with Syd Parker)

=== Ohio Valley Wrestling ===
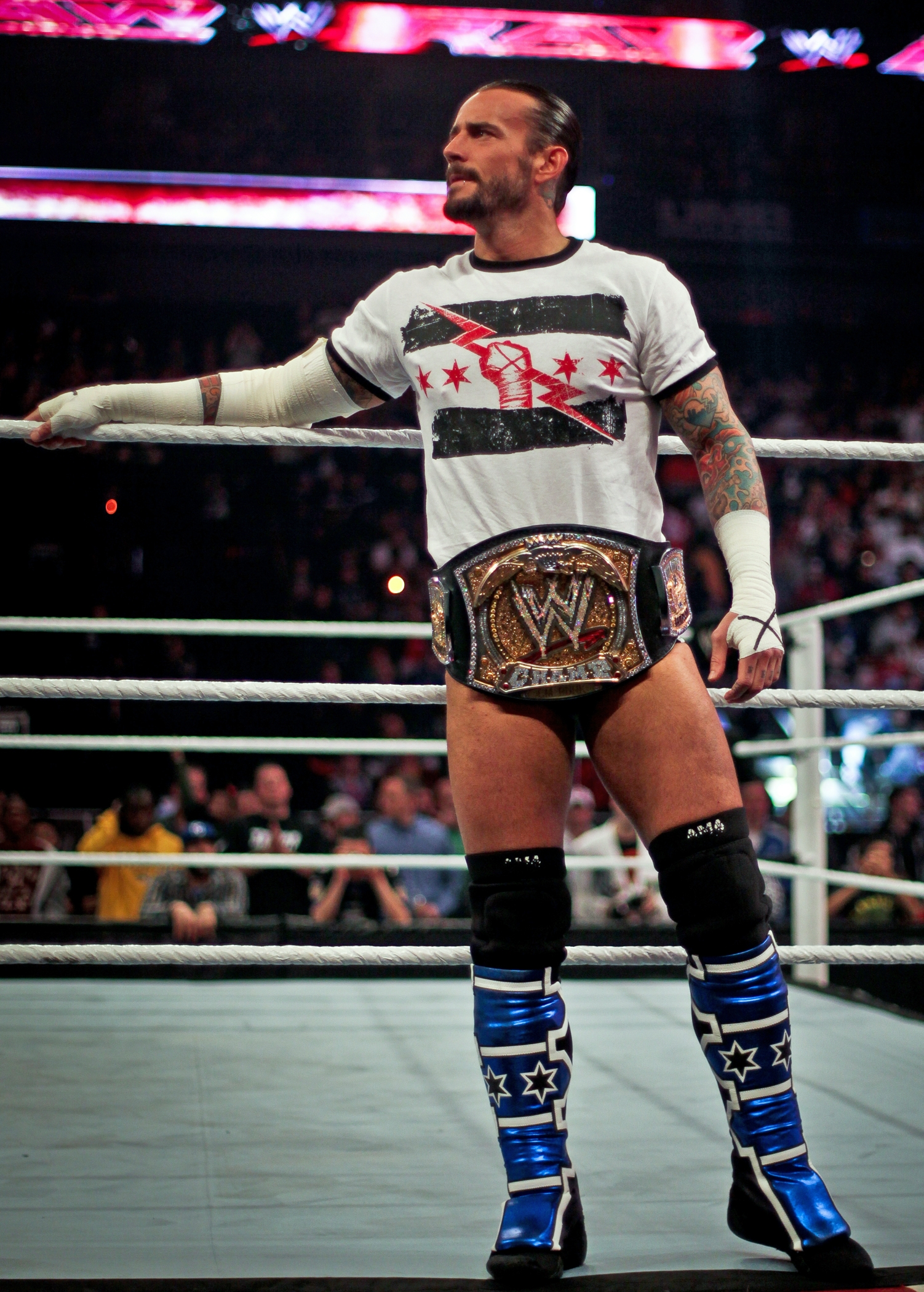
CM Punk, the first person to complete both the OVW and WWE Triple Crown

Ohio Valley Wrestling (OVW) is an independent regional promotion that at various points served as a developmental territory for WWE and Impact Wrestling (with whom OVW is once again currently affiliated). Their version consists of the OVW Heavyweight Championship, the OVW Television Championship and the OVW Southern Tag Team Championship.

==== List of OVW Triple Crown winners ====
Text
Dates in **bold**	The date the wrestler achieved the Triple Crown

Champion	Primary championship	Secondary championship	Tag team championship
Champion	Heavyweight	Television	Southern Tag Team
Brent Albright	**April 25, 2005**	January 5, 2005	March 31, 2004 (with Chris Masters)
CM Punk	May 3, 2006	November 9, 2005	**July 28, 2006** (with Seth Skyfire)
Idol Stevens	**March 14, 2007**	January 4, 2006	October 10, 2003 (with Nova)
Cody Runnels	February 17, 2007	**July 6, 2007**	October 18, 2006 (with Shawn Spears)
James "Moose" Thomas	**January 6, 2010**	September 9, 2009	September 27, 2009 (with Tilo)
Mike Mondo	**May 29, 2010**	February 4, 2009	November 11, 2009 (with Turcan Celik)
Rudy Switchblade	November 2, 2011	August 27, 2008	**February 22, 2012** (with Jessie Godderz and Rob Terry)
Rob Terry	**May 12, 2012**	April 21, 2012	February 22, 2012 (with Jessie Godderz and Rudy Switchblade)
Cliff Compton	January 8, 2011	**October 17, 2012**	March 19, 2006 (with Deuce)
Jason Wayne	July 1, 2011	September 21, 2011	**January 16, 2013** (with Crimson)
Jamin Olivencia	**April 10, 2013**	February 20, 2008	August 1, 2007 (with T.J. Dalton)
Flash Flanagan	November 26, 1999	**August 3, 2013**	August 1, 1997 (with Nick Dinsmore)
Adam Revolver	**December 6, 2014**	September 14, 2011	March 27, 2010 (with Ted McNaler)
Mohamad Ali Vaez	**February 7, 2015**	June 4, 2010	May 14, 2008 (with Omar Akbar)
Chris Silvio	**July 24, 2015**	December 21, 2011	December 10, 2008 (with Kamikaze Kid)
Elijah Burke	December 8, 2004	September 11, 2013	**December 5, 2015** (with Private Anthony)
Big Jon	**April 16, 2016**	March 5, 2016	July 5, 2014 (with The Bodyguy)
Rocco Bellagio	**May 14, 2016**	October 5, 2011	August 6, 2011 (with James "Moose" Thomas)
Devin Driscoll	March 19, 2016	October 11, 2006	**January 25, 2017** (with Tony Gunn)
Michael Hayes	**November 4, 2017**	August 2, 2014	June 26, 2013 (with Mohammed Ali Vaez)
Randy Royal	**February 14, 2018**	May 11, 2013	May 14, 2016 (with Shane Andrews)
Amon	**July 7, 2018**	March 4, 2017	February 10, 2016 (with Adam Revolver)
Tony Gunn	**January 30, 2019**	July 25, 2012	January 25, 2017 (with Devin Driscoll)
Justin Smooth	**April 24, 2019**	January 9, 2019	December 3, 2016 (with Big Jon)
Jay Bradley	June 1, 2007	July 31, 2019	**August 3, 2019** (with Big Zo, Ca$h Flo and Hy-Zaya)
Dimes	April 17, 2019	March 20, 2019	**November 12, 2019** (with Corey Storm)
Maximus Khan	**February 1, 2020**	August 21, 2019	April 6, 2019 (with Leonis Khan)
Dustin Jackson	**December 11, 2025**	November 21, 2018	February 3, 2018 (with Colton Cage)

=== Philippine Wrestling Revolution ===
Philippine Wrestling Revolution (PWR) is an independent promotion based in the Philippines. Their version consists of the PWR Championship, the PWR Tag Team Championship and the Philippine Excellence (PHX) Championship.

==== List of PWR Triple Crown winners ====
Text
Dates in **bold**	The date the wrestler achieved the Triple Crown

Champion	Primary championship	Secondary championship	Tag team championship
Champion	PWR	PHX	Tag Team
John Sebastian	November 13, 2016	**November 25, 2018**	March 11, 2018 (with Crystal)

=== Pro-Wrestling: EVE ===
Pro-Wrestling: EVE (EVE) is a British independent women's professional wrestling promotion. Their version consists of the Pro-Wrestling: EVE Championship, Pro-Wrestling: EVE International Championship, and the Pro-Wrestling: EVE Tag Team Championship.

==== List of Pro-Wrestling: EVE Triple Crown winners ====
Text
Dates in **bold**	The date the wrestler achieved the Triple Crown

Champion	Primary championship	Secondary championship	Tag team championship
Champion	Pro-Wrestling: EVE	International	Tag Team
Sammii Jayne	May 21, 2017	**February 1, 2020**	December 14, 2019 (with Gisele Shaw)

=== Revolution Pro Wrestling ===
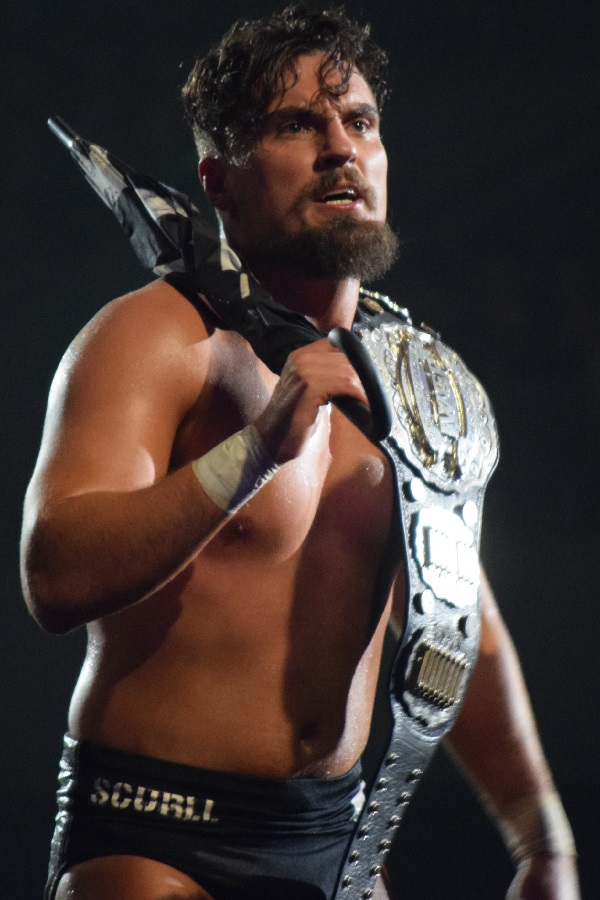
Marty Scurll is the first RevPro Triple Crown Champion

Revolution Pro Wrestling (RPW) is a United Kingdom based promotion. Their version consists of the British Heavyweight Championship, the Undisputed British Tag Team Championship and the British Cruiserweight Championship.

==== List of RPW Triple Crown winners ====
Text
Dates in **bold**	The date the wrestler achieved the Triple Crown

Champion	Primary championship	Secondary championship	Tag team championship
Champion	Undisputed British Heavyweight	Undisputed British Cruiserweight	Undisputed British Tag Team
Marty Scurll	**March 15, 2014**	October 13, 2012	May 4, 2009 (with Zack Sabre Jr.)
Will Ospreay	**February 14, 2020**	October 19, 2014	June 15, 2013 (with Paul Robinson)
Michael Oku	**July 9, 2023**	February 14, 2020	August 21, 2021 (with Connor Mills)
Luke Jacobs	August 24, 2024	July 23, 2022	**March 16, 2025** (with Ethan Allen)
Connor Mills	**August 29, 2026**	July 9, 2023	Augest 21,2021 (with Michael Oku)

== See also ==
- Championship unification – Combining two or more professional wrestling championships into a single championship
- Grand Slam (professional wrestling)
- Undisputed championship (professional wrestling) – Unquestioned top title in a promotion
