= IPW Television Championship =

Innovate Wrestling Television Championship

Details
- Promotion: Innovate Wrestling
- Date established: August 19, 2017
- Current champion(s): Tracer X
- Date won: December 29, 2018
Statistics
- First champion(s): Axton Ray
- Most reigns: Lenny Stratton and Sigmon (2)
- Longest reign: Lenny Stratton (193 days)
- Shortest reign: Sigmon (<1 day)

The Innovate Wrestling Television Championship is a secondary title in the American wrestling promotion Innovate Pro Wrestling. On August 19, 2017; promoter Tony Givens announced at ReGenesis that Smoky Mountain was pulling out of the NWA thus the promotion was changing names. Axton Ray was the reigning NWA Smoky Mountain Television Champion and was declared the Innovate Wrestling Television Champion as a result.

== Title history ==
As of March 14, 2025.

#	Numbers in bold indicate that a reign is current and changes daily
Reign	The reign number for the specific wrestler listed
+	Indicates the current reign is changing daily
—	Used for vacated reigns so as not to count it as an official reign
+	Indicates the current reign is changing daily
<1	The reign was less than a day

#	Champions	Reign	Date	Days held	Location	Event	Notes	Ref(s)
1	Axton Ray	1	August 19, 2017	21	Kingsport, Tennessee	ReGenesis	On August 19, 2017; promoter Tony Givens announced at ReGenesis that Smoky Mountain was pulling out of the NWA thus the promotion was changing names. Axton Ray was the reigning NWA Smoky Mountain Television Champion and was declared the Innovate Wrestling Television Champion as a result.	
2	Jeff Connelly	1	September 9, 2017	84	Bristol, Tennessee	Innovate Wrestling TV		
3	Lenny Stratton	1	December 12, 2017	193	Kingsport, Tennessee	Finale 2017		
4	Sigmon	1	June 23, 2018	70	Morristown, Tennessee	Summer Bash 2018		
5	Nicole Pain	1	September 1, 2018	35	Kingsport, Tennessee	Battle at the Bar		
6	Lenny Stratton	2	October 6, 2018	64	Kingsport, Tennessee	Fall Spectacular 2018		
7	Sigmon	2	December 29, 2018	<1	Kingsport, Tennessee, USA	Finale 2018		
8	Tracer X	1	December 29, 2018	2267+	Kingsport, Tennessee, USA	Finale 2018		

== Combined reigns ==
As of March 14, 2025.

†	Indicates the current champion

Rank	Champion	No. of reigns	Combined days
1	Tracer X†	1	2267+
2	Lenny Stratton	2	257
3	Jeff Connelly	1	84
4	Sigmon	2	70
5	Nicole Pain	1	35
6	Axton Ray	1	21
