= Jason Kincaid =

American professional wrestler

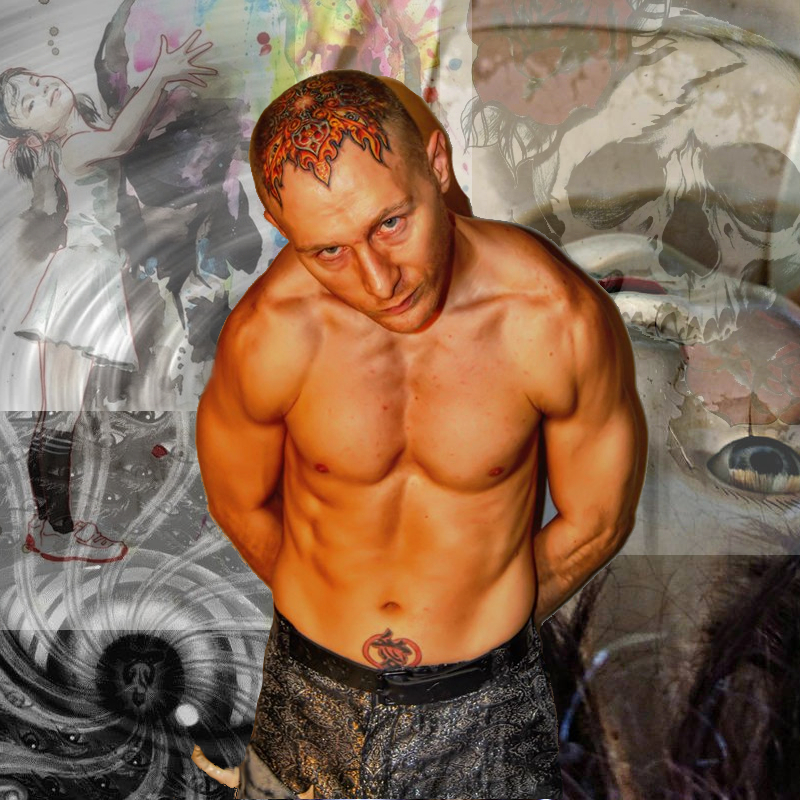
- Kincaid in 2018

Personal information
- Born: West Virginia, U.S.

Professional wrestling career
- Ring name(s): Jason Kincaid; Kincaid
- Billed height: 6 ft 0 in (1.83 m)
- Billed weight: 175 lb (79 kg)
- Billed from: Fayette County, West Virginia; Oak Hill, West Virginia
- Trained by: Bart Batten; Scotty Mckeever
- Debut: 2003

Jason "The Gift" Kincaid is an American retired professional wrestler. During his two-decade-long career, he was known for his time on the United States independent scene. He is best known for his time in Evolve, Dramatic Dream Team (DDT) in Japan, Ring of Honor (ROH), and the National Wrestling Alliance (NWA), where he is the former NWA World Junior Heavyweight Champion.

== Professional wrestling career ==
=== Independent circuit (2003–2026) ===
In 2003, Jason Kincaid began training as a wrestler under Scotty McKeever, but would start more hands-on training with The Batten Twins not long after, and debuted in May 2003, in Oak Hill, West Virginia, against TJ Phillips. During his first few years of active competition, Kincaid would travel across West Virginia, Ohio, Tennessee, North Carolina, and Pennsylvania wrestling for various independent promotions including Southern States Wrestling, George South's Exodus Wrestling Alliance, and Ted Dibiase's Power Wrestling Alliance. On August 8, 2007, he competed against AJ Styles in a losing effort in Dunbar, West Virginia on for Mega Pro Wrestling. At IWA East Coast's Stiff Competition 2 event, on July 12, 2011, in Nitro, West Virginia, he challenged heavyweight champion Chris Hero only to come up short after a Cyclone Kill kick to the head. On August 4, 2011, in Kingsport, Tennessee for NWA Smoky Mountain Kincaid defeated Kyle O'Reilly via pinfall after hitting the JK47. Two months later, at Remix Pro Wrestling's Throwdown For The Pound 4 event, on October 11, 2011, Kincaid pinned Jimmy Jacobs after hitting a piledriver. On New Year's Day 2012, Kincaid pinned Johnny Gargano with a victory roll at an American Pro Wrestling Alliance event in Clarksburg, West Virginia. Kincaid battled Davey Richards to a no contest, after members of Richard's Team Ambition interfered, on August 4, 2012, in Kingsport, Tennessee for NWA Smoky Mountain. Kincaid would go on to score a pinfall victory over Chuck Taylor in Corbin, Kentucky on April 20, 2013, for Pro Wrestling Freedom. Kincaid was able to pick up a pinfall victory over Matt Hardy in Summersville, West Virginia on June 2, 2013, for 304 Wrestling. On March 7, 2014, Kincaid defeated Lance Hoyt in Church Hill, Tennessee, to retain the NWA Smoky Mountain Championship.

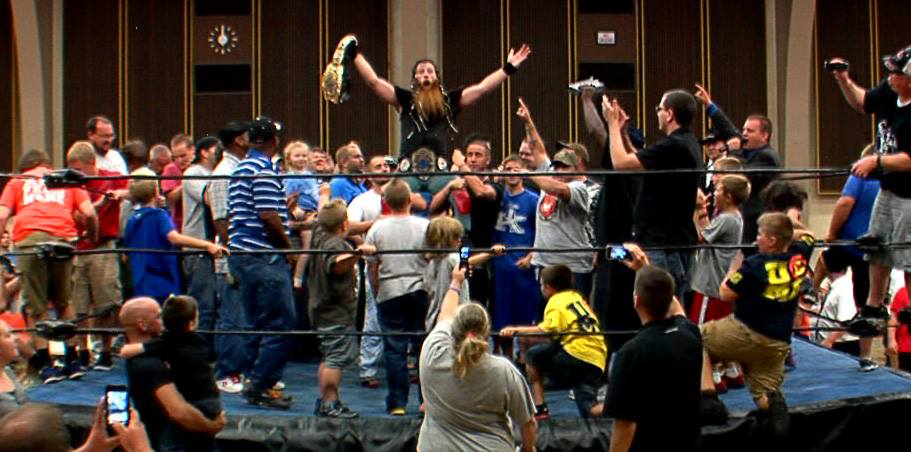
Jason "The Gift" Kincaid celebrates with fans after winning the NWA World Junior Heavyweight Championship

=== National Wrestling Alliance (2007–2017) ===
On October 11, 2011, in Kingsport, Tennessee Kincaid defeated Keith Knox to become the NWA Smoky Mountain champion and is currently the longest reigning champion in the National Wrestling Alliance.

After winning the opening match of a Remix Pro Wrestling event on October 6, 2012, in Marietta, Ohio, Kincaid was offered an NWA World Heavyweight Title match by champion Adam Pearce. Upon accepting the challenge Kincaid was attacked by Pearce and left lying in the ring after receiving a piledriver. That night, Kincaid would lose to Pearce via pinfall after taking a low blow and a second piledriver. On April 27, 2013, Kincaid would defeat (the now former NWA World Heavyweight Champion) Adam Pearce in a rematch via pinfall.

On August 10, 2013, at NWA Smoky Mountain's annual Fire On The Mountain event Kincaid won the NWA World Junior Heavyweight championship from Chase Owens in a Title vs Title match, with Kincaid putting the NWA Smoky Mountain Championship on the line, via pinfall. However, he lost the title on October 18, 2013.

On February 14, 2014, Kincaid defeated Chase Owens and Shawn Shultz in a Triple Title Turmoil match to become the NWA Southern Heavyweight Champion.

On December 9, 2014, Kincaid's NWA Smoky Mountain Championship was rechristened the NWA Southeastern Heavyweight Championship.

On December 27, 2014, Kincaid faced Rob Conway for the NWA World Heavyweight Title in a losing effort at the NWA Smoky Mountain Finale event. Earlier that same night he successfully defended his NWA Southern Heavyweight Championship in an impromptu match against long-standing rival Chase Owens.

On Saturday May 9, 2015, Jason Kincaid successfully defended his reign as NWA Southern Heavyweight Champion, against John Morrison at the main event of NWA Smokey Mountain's collision course in Kingsport, Tennessee.

On February 11, 2017, Kincaid's five-year reign as the NWA Southeastern Heavyweight Champion came to an end, when he lost the title to Chase Owens.

=== Mexico (2011) ===
During the fall and winter of 2011 Kincaid would travel to Mexico where he would compete in various trios (six man tag) matches. On December 18, 2011, he defeated veteran luchador Aztec to retain the NWA Smoky Mountain Championship at a Cajeme Lucha Libre event in Ciudad Obregón.

=== Total Nonstop Action Wrestling (2012, 2015) ===
On November 15, 2012 at Freedom Hall in Johnson City, Tennessee, Kincaid made his debut in Total Nonstop Action Wrestling, in a losing effort against Chase Owens. On September 15, 2015 at the Morgantown Event Center, in Morgantown, West Virginia, Kincaid returned to TNA in another losing effort to Chase Owens.

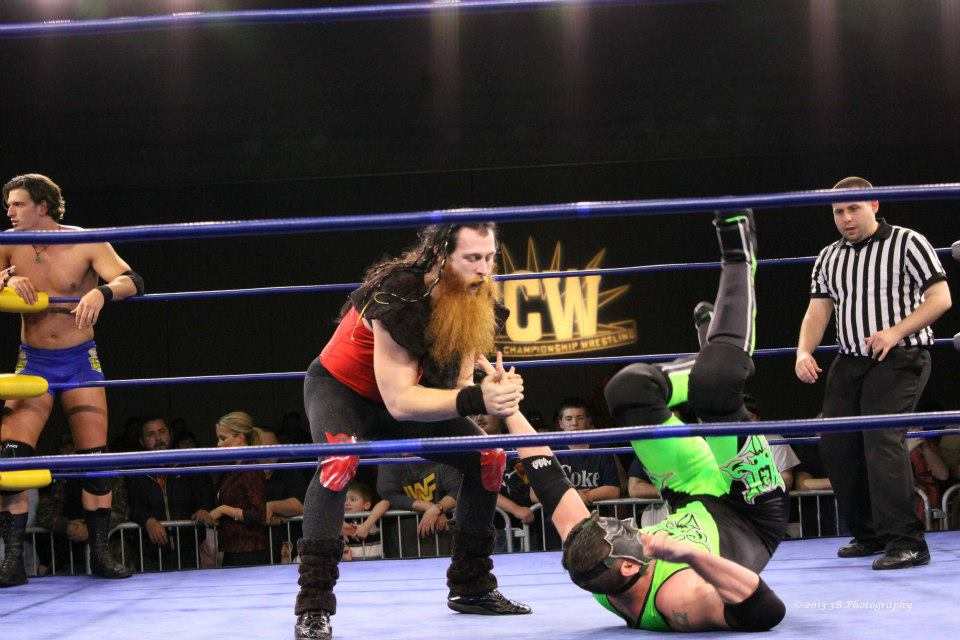
TCW Star Kincaid applies a wristlock to "Hurricane" Shane Helms

=== Traditional Championship Wrestling (2012–2014) ===
Kincaid made his debut for Traditional Championship Wrestling on August 11, 2012 in a losing effort to Sigmon. After picking up a few wins, Kincaid would go on to challenge and defeat X-Cal for the TCW Junior Heavyweight title, on September 15, 2012 in Memphis, Tennessee. At TCW's Missouri Madness Event, in Springfield, Missouri, Kincaid would lose the belt to John Saxon in a match that would spark a rivalry leading to a best of seven series. In match one of the best of seven series at TCW's Night Of The Champions event, Kincaid would defeat Saxon to regain the title and take a 1–0 series lead. On April 15, 2013 Kincaid successfully defended the TCW Junior Heavyweight Title against Brian Kendrick in Las Vegas at the Cauliflower Alley Club. One month later, at TCW's Mississippi Meltdown event John Saxon would defeat Kincaid to regain the title and tie the series 1–1. After going down 2–1 Kincaid would become a three-time TCW Junior Heavyweight Champion at TCW's Back To School Bash IV event in Fort Smith, Arkansas after a pinfall victory over Saxon. Kincaid would reclaim the TCW Junior Heavyweight Title from Americos at TCW's "Last Stand" event on November 16, 2013, in Fortsmith, Arkansas.

=== Canada (2014) ===
On May 7, 2014, Kincaid met Chris Hero in the first round of Canadian Wrestling's Elite's Elite 8 tournament, in Souris, Manitoba, in a losing effort. Kincaid scored a pinfall victory over Sonjay Dutt on October 19, 2014, in Morden, Manitoba.

=== Ring of Honor (2016) ===
On January 9, 2016, Kincaid made his debut for Ring of Honor during their Winter Warriors tour in a losing effort to Lio Rush as part of the company's annual Top Prospect Tournament. He would go on to compete for ROH several more times, that year, facing off against Donovan Dijak, A. C. H., Roderick Strong, Mark Briscoe, and others.

=== EVOLVE Wrestling (2016–2018) ===
On October 15, 2016, Kincaid debuted for EVOLVE. On December 16, 2016, EVOLVE's parent company WWNLive announced that they had signed Kincaid. As a core member of the EVOLVE roster, Kincaid has picked up wins against Caleb Konley, Sean Maluta, Dustin, and others.

==== WWE (2018) ====
Through the Evolve partnership, on May 4, 2018, Kincaid made his WWE debut at WrestleMania Axxess in New Orleans, Louisiana as an invitee in the NXT North American Title Invitational tournament, losing in the first round to Fabian Aichner.

=== Japan (2018-2019) ===
On April 29, 2018, Kincaid made his debut for Dramatic Dream Team at the promotion's Max Bump 2018 event, at Korakuen Hall, in Tokyo, Japan in a winning effort alongside Mizuki Watase in tag-team action. Kincaid and Watase would join leader Shigehiro Irie's faction The Renegades, which would later include Sammy Guevara and Facade. Kincaid has gone on to tour regularly for DDT, during which time he has picked up victories over the likes of Jun Kasai, Shuji Ishikawa, and Keisuke Ishii.

=== Final Matches and Retirement (2026) ===
On March 14, 2026, at Innovate Pro Wrestling's 24th Anniversary Show, Kincaid was inducted into the Innovate Hall of Heroes Class of 2026 alongside fellow wrestlers Nick Hammonds and "Big" Steve Fury, longtime NWA Smoky Mountain commentator Matt Rhodes, and Innovate's former rival promotion, Pro Wrestling Federation (PWF). During his speech, Kincaid announced that 2026 would be the final year of his pro wrestling career and that his last Innovate match would take place on April 11 at Innovate Wrestling's "One Final Gift" against current Innovate Grand Champion Andy Optimal.

At "One Final Gift", the match ended in a loss for Kincaid after Optimal hit Kincaid's signature move, Grave of the Fireflies, before beating him by pinfall. Following the match, Kincaid would be given a standing ovation before he gave a special speech to the fans, thanking Tony Givens and the Innovate Wrestling fans for his 23-year career. After his speech, Innovate wrestlers, notably Axton Ray, Toby Farley, Chainz, Brandon Hartsook, and Wayne Moxxi, would all come out to congratulate him as he left his boots in the ring.

On April 25, Kincaid would wrestle in his last match for Battleground Wrestling (BGW) in Putnam County, West Virginia, at "Operation Firestorm" against Sis Sisaki in a losing effort. Following the match, Kincaid would thank the crowd and embrace Sisaki, an opponent that he was always adamant about sharing the ring with.

On June 13, Kincaid would wrestle at "Bash in Beckley 6" for All Star Wrestling West Virginia in a triple threat match against "The 8-Bit Man" Huffmanly and "The Neon Ninja" Facade for the ASW Heavyweight Championship. He would ultimately win the title and said he "hopes to make it to December and retire as champion."

== Championships and accomplishments ==
- 304 Wrestling
  - 304 Wrestling Tag Team Championship (1 time) – with Chris Richards
- All Star Wrestling (West Virginia)
  - All Star Wrestling Tag Team Championship (1 time) – with Chris Richards
  - All Star Wrestling Heavyweight Champion (1 time)
- American Pro Wrestling Alliance
  - APWA Super Junior Championship (1 time)
  - APWA World Tag Team Championship (1 time) - with Smokey C
- AWA Apex
  - AWA Apex Shooting Star Championship (1 time)
  - AWA Apex Tag Team Championship (3 times) – with Danny Ray (1), Mr. Black (1), and Flex Tolley (1)
- East Coast Wrestling Association
  - ECWA Super 8 Tournament (2015)
- Glory Pro
  - Crown of Glory Championship (1 time, inaugural)
  - Crown of Glory Championship Tournament (2017)
- Modern Vintage Wrestling
  - MVW Heavyweight Championship (2 time, inaugural)
  - MVW Heavyweight Title Tournament (2016)
- National Wrestling Alliance
  - NWA World Junior Heavyweight Championship (1 time)
- NWA Mountain State
  - NWA Mountain State Feud Of The Year (2 times) – with Chuck Jones (1) and Kris King (1)
  - NWA Mountain State Heavyweight Championship (1 time)
  - NWA Mountain State Match Of The Year (2 time) – with Chuck Jones (1) and Kris King (1)
  - NWA Mountain State Tag Team Championship (1 time) – with Eric Darkstorm
  - King of West Virginia Tournament (2009)
- NWA Smoky Mountain Wrestling
  - NWA Southeastern Heavyweight Championship (1 time)
  - NWA Smoky Mountain Tag Team Championship (1 time) – with Chris Richards
  - NWA Smoky Mountain Championship (1 time)
  - Smoky Mountain Cup (2014)
  - Innovate Pro Wrestling Hall of Heroes (2026)
- NWA Southern All-Star Wrestling
  - NWA Southern Heavyweight Championship (1 time)
- Ohio Hatchet Wrestling
  - Ohio Hatchet Heavyweight Championship (1 time)
- Primal Conflict Wrestling
  - PCW Tag Team Championship (1 time) - with Matt Conard
  - Primal Conflict Wrestling Match of the Year (2012) – with Bobby Shields
- Pro Wrestling Illustrated
  - PWI ranked him #231 of the top 500 singles wrestlers in the PWI 500 in 2015
- Style Battle
  - Style Battle Tournament (2017)
- Canadian Wrestling's Elite
  - Elite 8 (2016)
- Supreme Wrestling
  - Supreme Heavyweight Championship (1 time)
  - Supreme Light Heavyweight Championship (1 time)
- Proving Ground Pro Wrestling
  - PGP Cutting Edge Championship (1 time)
- Appalachian Championship Wrestling
  - ACW International Championship (1 time)
- Southern States Wrestling
  - Southern States Wrestling Heritage Championship (1 time)
- Traditional Championship Wrestling
  - TCW Junior Heavyweight Championship (3 times)
