= Innovate Pro Wrestling =

American independent professional wrestling promotion

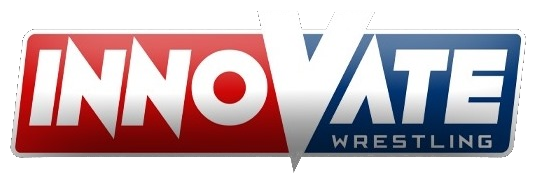
- Founded: 2004
- Style: Professional wrestling
- Headquarters: Kingsport, Tennessee
- Owner: Tony Givens
- Formerly: Championship Wrestling Alliance (2004-2011); NWA Smoky Mountain (2011-2017)
- Predecessor: Smoky Mountain Wrestling (unofficial)
- Website: innovatewrestling.com (defunct)

Innovate Pro Wrestling (formerly Championship Wrestling Alliance and NWA Smoky Mountain) is an American independent professional wrestling promotion based in Kingsport, Tennessee. The company was established in 2004 and until 2017 it was associated with the National Wrestling Alliance. During its time in the NWA, NWA Smoky Mountain Wrestling was considered the flagship promotion of the National Wrestling Alliance.

== History ==
Logo when the promotion was NWA Smoky Mountain

The promotion was founded by wrestler Tony Givens in 2004, as the Championship Wrestling Alliance, after breaking away from Southern States Wrestling. That same year, Championship Wrestling TV began airing locally on WCYB-DT2 and was later syndicated nationally on AMG-TV. It held weekly television tapings at the National Guard Armory in Morristown, Tennessee as well as house shows throughout East Tennessee. The promotion joined the National Wrestling Alliance as NWA Smoky Mountain Wrestling in early-2011. The announcement was made by CWA Commissioner Robbie Cassidy on the March 13th TV taping of Championship Wrestling TV in Gray, Tennessee. On July 7, 2012, an unidentified fan attacked Cassidy and Tony Givens at an interpromotional show co-hosted by the Pro Wrestling Federation. The fan was subdued by Cassidy and police escorted him out of the building.

On April 6, 2013, NWA Smoky Mountain drew its biggest crowd to date with 2,017 fans attending a NWA Smoky Mountain TV television taping at Elizabethton High School. In October 2013, Givens attempted to raise $15,000 on Kickstarter.com to improve the production values for NWA Smoky Mountain TV. The appeal raised only $1,485 before the 60-day deadline. The show became available on YouTube the following year.

NWA Smoky Mountain is advertised as a "spiritual successor" of the original Smoky Mountain Wrestling and has used a mix of SMW alumni and younger Southern independent wrestlers since its inception. Among the SMW talent to appear for the promotion include, most notably, Bunkhouse Buck, Eddie Golden, Tom Prichard, Tracy Smothers and Ricky Morton. On January 6, 2014, Morton defeated Chase Owens at an NWA Smoky Mountain show to win the NWA World Junior Heavyweight Championship.

A number of top NWA stars have also visited the promotion. In February 2015, Jason Kincaid was interviewed on Pipebomb Radio. He was billed as the longest-reigning NWA Southeastern Heavyweight Championship in the company's history. On April 17, 2015, Jax Dane won the Smoky Mountain Cup and earned a title shot for the NWA World Heavyweight Championship. He defeated then champion Hiroyoshi Tenzan for the title four months later. NWA Smoky Mountain's "Collision Course 10", held on May 9, 2015, nearly sold out the Civic Auditorium in Kingsport, Tennessee. Bobby Eaton also made a special appearance managing Eddie Golden against Jeff Tankersley on the undercard. Larry Goodman of GeorgiaWrestlingHistory.com claimed that the show, headlined by an A.J. Styles versus Chase Owens bout, "[shattered] the company's attendance and gate records". NWA President R. Bruce Tharpe visited Kingsport for the first time at this event.

On October 17, 2015, NWA Smoky Mountain held a special tribute show, "Enter the Dragon", for Ricky Steamboat. Steamboat served as Ricky Morton's cornerman in a "student vs. teacher" grudge match against Kid Kash as part of Kash's retirement tour. This turned a no-holds-barred grudge match after a falling out between the two during a tag team bout.

At ReGenesis on August 19, 2017; promoter Tony Givens announced that NWA Smoky Mountain Wrestling was leaving the NWA, and thus the promotion was changing their name to Innovate Wrestling.

By mid 2024, Innovate Wrestling had a permanent residency at "The Beautiful Bobby Eaton Arena" at NETPRO Studios Professional Wrestling School in Kingsport, Tennessee, where they continue to host monthly wrestling shows to this day.

On May 23rd, 2026, at Collision Course, Givens would announce an upcoming Innovate Expansion Draft that would split the Innovate Roster into two separate brands: Innovate Wrestling "Alliance" (inspired by the promotion's original name, Championship Wrestling Alliance) and Innovate Wrestling "Federation" (inspired by Innovate's former rival promotion, Pro Wrestling Federation (PWF) in nearby Rogersville). The draft, which took place on June 20th, was conducted with both Innovate and NETPRO Studios wrestlers eligible for the draft. On May 31st, the general managers for both brands were announced, with current Innovate Wrestling GM Truman Gorman as the GM for "Alliance", and former PWF promoter Josh Crawford as the GM for "Federation".

On October 21st, 2026, it was announced that the Innovate Wrestling Women's Champion, "Hardcore" Nicole Pain, had suffered a knee injury at home and would not be able to compete at the upcoming all-women's wrestling show at NETPRO Studios, Masquerade. Because of this, she would relinquish the title, and the event would be reorganized into the first-ever women's Smoky Mountain Cup tournament. Ultimately, at Masquerade on October 24th, "The Wicked Misfit" Shawna Reed would successfully win both her qualifying matchup and the five-woman elimination match finals to become a two-time Innovate Wrestling Women's Champion.

== Championships and Accomplishments ==
=== Current Champions ===
| Championship | Champion | Previous | Date won | Days held | Location |
|---|---|---|---|---|---|
| Innovate Grand Championship | Axton Ray | Andy Optimal | May 23rd, 2026 | 169+ | Kingsport, Tennessee (Innovate Wrestling's Collision Course) |
| Innovate American Championship | Wayne Moxxi | Bobby Mitchell | April 11th, 2026 | 211+ | Kingsport, Tennessee (Innovate Wrestling's One Final Gift) |
| Innovate Smoky Mountain Championship | Joe Briggs | N/A (Inaugural Champion) | August 8th, 2026 | 92+ | Kingsport, Tennessee (Innovate Wrestling Alliance's Fire On The Mountain) |
| Innovate Grand Tag Team Championship | The Adkins Boys (Ben and Alex Adkins) | Sin City (Axton Ray and Brandon Hartsook) | November 14th, 2026 | 1+ | Kingsport, Tennessee (Innovate Wrestling's November Reign) |
| Innovate Women's Championship | Shawna Reed | Nicole Pain (relinquished due to injury) | October 24th, 2026 | 15+ | Kingsport, Tennessee (NETPRO Studios Masquerade All Women's Show) |
| Baddest Motherf*cker (BMF) Championship | Chainz | N/A (First Champion) | May 23rd, 2026 | 169+ | Kingsport, Tennessee (Innovate Wrestling's Collision Course) |
| NETPRO Studios Heavyweight Championship | Nick Blackwell | Crazo | July 3rd, 2026 | 128+ | Kingsport, Tennessee (NETPRO Studios Battlegrounds) |

=== Retired Championships ===
| Championship | Final champion | Date retired | Notes |
|---|---|---|---|
| NWA Southeastern Heavyweight Championship | Chase Owens | August 19, 2017 | At ReGenesis, promoter Tony Givens announced that NWA Smoky Mountain Wrestling was leaving the NWA thus the promotion was changing their name to Innovate Wrestling and the NWA Southeastern Heavyweight Championship was officially retired as a result. |
| NWA United States Tag Team Championship | The Ugly Ducklings (Rob Killjoy, Coach Mikey, & Lance Lude) | August 19, 2017 | At ReGenesis, promoter Tony Givens announced that NWA Smoky Mountain Wrestling was leaving the NWA thus the promotion was changing their name to Innovate Wrestling and the NWA United States Tag Team Championship was officially retired as a result. |
| NWA Mountain Empire Championship | Toby Farley | August 19, 2017 | At ReGenesis, promoter Tony Givens announced that NWA Smoky Mountain Wrestling was leaving the NWA thus the promotion was changing their name to Innovate Wrestling and the NWA Mountain Empire Championship was officially retired as a result. Farley defeated Timmy Lou Retton to become the Interim Innovate United States Heavyweight Championship as a result. |
| NWA Smoky Mountain Television Championship | Chris Richards | August 19, 2017 | |
| AWA World Heavyweight Championship/CWA World Heavyweight Championship (American Wrestling Affiliates/Championship Wrestling Alliance) | Chris Richards | February 4, 2011 | |
| Innovate United States Heavyweight Championship | Toby Farley | May 29, 2021 | |
| Innovate United States Tag Team Championships | The Faction (Jeff Baker and Jeff Connelly) | June 20th, 2026 | At the Innovate Wrestling Expansion Draft show, Tony Givens announced that the U.S. Tag Titles were being retired and replaced with the Innovate Grand Tag Team Championships. The Faction would win the Triple Threat Tag Team match against the Cross Brothers and Alex and Ben Adkins to become the first Grand Tag Champs, essentially retiring the U.S. titles in the process. |

== See also ==
- List of National Wrestling Alliance territories
- List of independent wrestling promotions in the United States
