= Gino Martino =

American professional wrestler

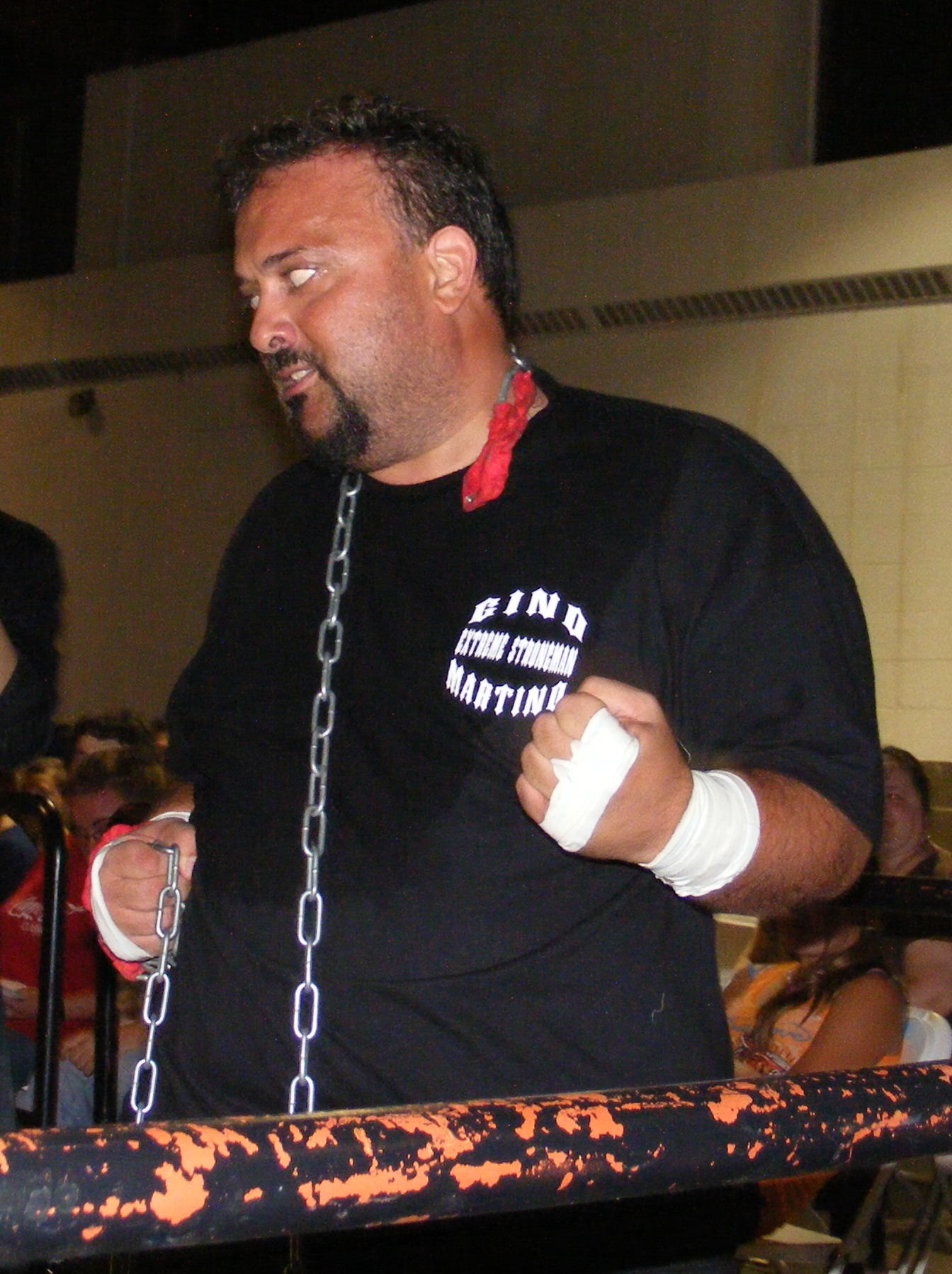
- Martino in September 2008

Personal information
- Born: John Ferraro; November 28, 1967 (age 58) Revere, Massachusetts, U.S.
- Website: Official website

Professional wrestling career
- Ring name(s): Gino Martino; Muscles Martino; Millinium Killa; The Golden Gorilla
- Billed height: 5 ft 10 in (178 cm)
- Billed weight: 280 lb (127 kg)
- Trained by: Bruiser Costa; Rip Morrison; Dan Petiglio; Paul Zine; Ox Baker; The Iron Sheik
- Debut: November 1996

John Ferraro (born November 28, 1967) is an American professional wrestler and strongman, best known by his ring name Gino Martino. He has wrestled for Chaotic Wrestling, the Millennium Wrestling Federation, New England Championship Wrestling, NWA New England, Ultimate Ring Wars and Paulie Gilmore's New World Wrestling. Although based in the Northeast, competing most often in the New England region, Ferraro has wrestled in other parts of the US as well as in Canada and Europe.

Ferraro has held championship titles in numerous promotions in his career. He is a former NWA New England Heavyweight Champion, NWA New England Colonial Heavyweight Champion, NWA New England Tag Team Champion (with Ali Mohammed), and winner of the 2004 Tony Rumble Memorial Rumble. He also feuded with "Big" Rick Fuller over the Chaotic Wrestling Heavyweight Championship during 2001, winning the belt twice. Nine years later, he was inducted into the promotion's hall of fame. He has been similarly honored by the New England Pro Wrestling Hall of Fame.

In addition to these championships Ferraro has won a number of brass knuckles and similar hardcore-themed titles, most notably, the AWA and NWA New England Brass Knuckles Championships; he is also only one of two men, along with Don Fargo, to hold brass knuckles titles recognized by both the American Wrestling Association and National Wrestling Alliance. He has been featured in New Wave Wrestling, Pro Wrestling Illustrated, WOW Magazine, and Wrestle America; one magazine ranked Ferraro #39 of the top 50 brawlers in pro wrestling history.

He has won numerous tag team titles as one-half of The Millenium Killaz with Ali Mohammed. He was also part of The Alliance of Violence with The Vachon Brothers in CWA Montreal, where he and Pierre Vachon became the promotion's first-ever tag team champions in 2006, and Demon Ortiz in Chaotic Wrestling several years later.

A legitimate strongman, Ferraro has performed feats of strength for numerous television and radio shows in New England, and at public events throughout the world. Often referred to as "Hammer Head" or "The Human Anvil", his specialty is breaking heavy objects such as concrete cinderblocks over his head. An assistant is generally used to drop bowling balls or operate a jackhammer or sledge. He has also encouraged 300 pound wrestlers to stand on his chest while lying on a bed of nails. In 2010, he was featured on Stan Lee's Superhumans. Less than a year later one of his demonstrations in Milan, Italy, aired on Lo show dei record, set the Guinness World Record for the most concrete blocks (45) broken on the head with a bowling ball.

== Early life ==
John Ferraro was born in Revere, Massachusetts. He was a fan of pro wrestling growing up and followed the World Wide Wrestling Federation during the late 1970s and early 80s. Superstar Billy Graham, The Samoans, and managers Freddie Blassie and The Grand Wizard were among his favorites. He started weightlifting during his teenage years and eventually became a collegiate Bench Press and olympic-style weightlifting champion. As a powerlifter he benched 565 lbs.and lift 350 lbs. in the behind the neck press. He also had a background in martial arts, namely judo, and was also a power breaking champion. Ferraro was later employed as director of sales and marketing at Patriot Plastics in Woburn, Massachusetts, and remained with the company throughout his pro wrestling career.

Ferraro eventually became interested in a pro wrestling career. He considered attending Killer Kowalski's wrestling school in Malden, Massachusetts but decided against it due to the high tuition fees. He was instead trained by Jeff "Bruiser" Costa, Rip Morrison, Dan Petiglio, and Paul Zine among others. Zine specifically helped develop his in-ring persona and getting him bookings in his early career. He also received additional training from Tony Rumble, Ox Baker, and The Iron Sheik and adopted versions of their finishers as homages to the latter two.

== Professional wrestling career ==
=== Early career in the New England independents (1996–1999) ===
Ferraro made his professional debut in November 1996 and wrestled for the first six months of his career as "The Golden Gorilla". He started his career in Jeff Costa's World Independent Wrestling promotion in New Hampshire twice winning the promotion's heavyweight title from Sonny Goodspeed and Bart Hart respectively. On December 13, 1998, he took part in Power League Wrestling's "Power-House Brawl", a benefit show for United States Marine Corps "Toys for Tots" program, at Johnson & Wales University in Providence, Rhode Island. Ferraro was the 17th entrant in the 23-man event and eliminated three wrestlers before he, the last participant, was eliminated by Derik Destiny. Four months later, he defeated Universal Soldier for the PLW Heavyweight Championship at St. Anthony's Parish Center in Pawtucket. Ferraro was subsequently stripped of the title after awarding it to his manager Scott Knight. That same year, he received an award for "Best Newcomer" (1998).

Over the next two years, he won titles in numerous promotions on the New England independent circuit. In 1999, he became the first wrestler to simultaneously hold the heavyweight titles of the top three independent promotions in Rhode Island at the time (Unified Championship Wrestling, Independent Wrestling Alliance, and Power League Wrestling). He also won multiple tag team titles with Ali Mohammed as The Millenium Killaz. In August 1999, the team won the UCW Tag Team Championship from Kyle Storm and Widowmaker in a Bed of Nails hardcore match. A year later, they also won the tag team titles in International Independent Wrestling and Primal Conflict Wrestling. Ferraro was also involved with Northeast Championship Wrestling in West Warwick, Rhode Island. Starting in 2000, he and Anthony "Troubleman" Rufo began training a select few of the NCW roster.

=== NWA New England (1999–2000) ===
It was during this period that Ferraro got his first big break wrestling for Tony Rumble and the NWA New England promotion in Boston, Massachusetts. He appeared on its inaugural event held at the Good Times Emporium in Somerville, Massachusetts where he teamed with Joel Davis and Trooper Gilmore in a 6-man tag team match against The NY Posse (Ron Zombie, Curtis Slamdawg, and Jay Kobain). He began competing regularly for the promotion the following year scoring victories over "Brutal" Bob Evans and Alex Arion in the fall of 1999.

On July 20, 2000, he and Ali Mohammed won the NWA New England Tag Team Championship from (Luis Ortiz, Slyk Wagner Brown, and Jason Rumble). They dropped the belts to Luis Ortiz and Jason Rumble a month later in Somerville; earlier in the show, Martino defeated Trooper Gilmore, Nemesis, Jaime Paine and Zach Mason in a five-way match to win the NWA New England Brass Knuckles Championship. Prior to losing the tag team belts, he was the first wrestler to hold both the NWA New England Tag Team and Brass Knuckles titles at the same time. At one point, he was managed The Pink Assassin and was walked to the ring with a dog collar.

Also that summer, a cage match between Ferraro and John Kronus ended in a no-contest. The two met again in September three months later for a UCW show at Johnson and Wales College. Their hardcore match went to a 20-min. draw before referees stopped the match. The infamous "Blood Bath Street Fight" became the "Most Requested Match of the Year" on Joe Bruins' Hardcore Wrestling show aired on Cox Cable in Rhode Island. The Millennium Killaz also defended the PCW Tag Team Championship against one-time ECW World Tag Team Champions The Pitbulls (Pitbull #1 and Pitbull #2), a bout which ended in a double-disqualification. At the end of the month, Martino faced his tag team partner in a three-way thumbtack match with Jamie Paine for the NWA New England Brass Knuckles title on September 28, 2000. That same year he was one of several wrestlers featured in the 2000 pro wrestling documentary "Ringmasters: Pro Wrestling in New England", a special presentation by New England Sports Network which later aired on Spike TV.

=== Chaotic Wrestling (2000–2001) ===
Ferraro began wrestling for Chaotic Wrestling in late 2000. On October 20, 2000, he defeated Jay Jaillette for the Chaotic Wrestling Heavyweight Championship in Worcester, Massachusetts. In his seven-month championship reign, Ferraro successfully defended the title against some of the top wrestlers in the Northeast. On January 12, 2001, he defeated John Kronus in a "Revere Street Fight" involving a bed of nails. He also faced El Mascarado (February 9), "Mr. USA" Tony Atlas (February 23), and Ronnie D. Lishus (April 6), the latter match being officiated by special guest referee Ricky "The Dragon" Steamboat. Another notable opponent was his tag team partner, Ali Mohammed, who he defeated in a Razor Chain match. Ferraro finally lost the belt to Rick Fuller at the Wonderland Greyhound Park in Revere on May 18. A few weeks later, he entered the 2001 King of Chaos tournament and made it to the finals where Ferraro lost to Ali Mohammed in a four-way match with Jamie Paine and Nemesis. This was the first-ever "hardcore" match held in New England to use a no-rope barbed wire ring, light tubes, fire, a bed of nails, thumbtacks, and foreign objects. On June 23, he also teamed with Short Sleeve Sampson in a losing effort against The One Night Stand at the Knights of Columbus Hall in Methuen, Massachusetts.

Ferraro regained the heavyweight title from Fuller in a Lights Out match on the July 13th edition of Friday Night Chaos. In August, the then reigning Chaotic Wrestling champion was interviewed by Boston Magazine in which he discussed the difficulties of being an independent wrestler. His second reign lasted for a little over two months before he was dethroned by The One Night Stand's Ronnie D. Lishus in Lawrence, Massachusetts on September 7, 2001; he had defeated Aaron Stevens in a match lasting 47 seconds earlier that same night. Two weeks later, Ferraro defeated Jimmy Cash in a Tables match. His last match was against Scarecrow on December 14, 2001, which ended in a disqualification. Suffering a serious neck injury in his bout with Ronnie D. Lishus, he took three months off to recuperate and lost 30 pounds by the time he returned to action early the next year.

=== Independent circuit (2002–2003) ===
Prior to the end of his first run with Chaotic Wrestling, Ferraro returned to Rhode Island where he and Ali Mohammed regained the PCW Tag Team Championship from The Mutilators on October 4, 2002. On January 18, 2003, in Ultimate Championship Wrestling, he also defeated Travis Funk in a Strap match to win the UCW Heavyweight Championship. A year later, The Millenium Killaz won the UCW Tag Team Championship as well. Ferraro also wrestled for Jaime Pain and Nemesis' Crimson Mask Wrestling, PWF Northeast, and Rocky Raymond's Empire Professional Wrestling, the latter running events at Whalom Park and Thompson Speedway. Although primarily based in the Northeast and New England region, Ferraro eventually wrestled in other parts the country, such as for Bill Behrens in Georgia and Bert Prentice in Tennessee, as well as in Canada and Europe.

=== Millennium Wrestling Federation (2003–2004) ===
In late 2003, Ferraro joined the Millennium Wrestling Federation. He was originally brought in by MWF Commissioner Dr. Von Johnson to take out Ralph Lano but later turned against him. At MWF's "Soul Survivor", he and Slyk Wagner Brown attacked Todd Hanson following his victory over D-Lo Brown, also cutting his hair and throwing it at Hanson's family members seated at ringside. Embarrassing Hanson in front of his hometown, their actions began a heated year-long feud between the two wrestlers. Later on in the show, in which Ferraro was scheduled to have a championship match, MWF Commissioner Dr. Von Johnson "screwed" him by ordering a gauntlet match instead. Ferraro defeated three other wrestlers to get to Todd Hanson and battled to a double-countout. He was later recruited by Ox Baker to join his stable, Ox Baker's Army. While managed by Baker, he used a variation of Baker's infamous heart punch, using a headbutt rather than a punch, called the "Baker Breaker". Soul Survivor 04' saw Ferraro team with Kamala the Ugandan Giant and The Executioner in a 6-man tag team match against Todd Hanson, Beau Douglas, and "Cowboy" Bob Orton. When Hanson pinned the Executioner, Ferraro was blamed for the loss since he was the team captain. He started trading blows with Kamala and his former stablemates turned against him. Eventually, Todd Hanson and his team returned to the ring on Ferraro's behalf. The show ended with Ferraro shaking hands with his long-time rival.

=== Return to NWA NE (2004–2005) ===
Ferraro returned to NWA New England in the summer of 2004. On June 4, he won a 12-man taped fist battle royal to regain the NWA New England Brass Knuckles Championship. He briefly lost the title to Osirus on August 4 but regained it six days later in a "Buxton Barroom Brawl" in Buxton, Maine. The bout was voted the best match of the year for New Wrestling Horizons by the Freaks of Wrestling website. Ferraro followed this up with successful title defenses against Johnny Curtis, Craig Stratton, Brian Black, and Jason Rumble.

In addition to the NWA New England-New Wrestling Horizons interpromotional shows, Ferraro also wrestled solely for NWH shows where he feuded with Larry Huntley. On September 28, Ferraro also pinned Jason Rumble in a match to decide the number one contender for the NWH Heavyweight Championship. He later teamed with Danny Dangerous to win the NWH Tag Team titles from The Elite (Larry Huntley and Sonny Roselli).

In October, Ferraro represented NWA New England at the 2-day NWA 56th Anniversary Show in Winnipeg, Manitoba; he and Larry Huntley lost to The Trailer Park Boyz (Matt Korn and Dave Drako) on the first night (October 15) while Ferraro defeated Dave Drako the second night (October 16). He also defended the title in New Wrestling Horizons and NWA Green Mountain that same month. On November 4, 2004, Ferraro won the 2nd annual Tony Rumble Memorial "Rumble" Battle Royal, co-promoted by NWA New England and Paulie Gilmore's New World Wrestling, and was awarded the NWA New England Colonial Heavyweight Championship; also during the show he successfully defended the NWA Brass Knuckles title in a Broken Glass Death match against Dave Donavan winning via submission. Two weeks later, Ferraro defeated Beau Douglas at NWA New England's 2004 Tony Rumble Memorial Show. He spent the rest of the year making Brass Knuckle title defenses in NWA Green Mountain, NWA USA Pro Wrestling, and NWA Wildside.

On February 4, 2005, Ferraro beat The Outpatient and Apocalypse in a Triple Threat match to win the NWA New England Heavyweight Championship. As a result of this victory, he became the only wrestler in NWA New England history to simultaneously hold the promotion's heavyweight, colonial, and bass knuckles championships.

One day after his victory, Ferraro defended the NWA New England Brass Knuckles title at New World Wrestling's "Extreme Revenge" against Pierre Vachon in a barbed-wire chain death match. On March 3, Ferraro won a hardcore battle royal in the All Star Wrestling Federation by pinning Jose Perez via a fireball. Two weeks later in NWA New England, he and the 7'2" 550 lbs. Bull Moose Calhoun fought to a no-contest in a Dog Collar match. On June 10, 2005, he defended the Brass Knuckles title against Pierre Vachon in a Fans Bring the Weapons match. He re-wrestled Vachon, this time in a three-way broken bottle death match with Dave Donavan, and won the ASWF Hardcore Championship.

=== Return to MWF (2005) ===
After leaving Ox Baker's Army, Ferraro began training with The Iron Sheik who eventually became his manager. Like Ox Baker, he started using his own version of The Iron Sheik's Camel clutch finisher called the "Iron Clutch". It was during this time that Ferraro started the so-called "Headbutt Challenge" offering $5,000 to anyone who could knock him out in a headbutting contest. No one was successful in collecting the money. This was initially done to promote himself as having "the hardest head in all pro wrestling", however, this was later incorporated into his legitimate strongman performances.

On August 5, 2005, he wrestled both Vachon Brothers in a single night, defeating Damian in the first match and Pierre Vachon in an Anything Goes match later on. On September 24, 2005, he won a "King of the Jungle" Death match against Kamala at "Road to the Gold" to win the AWA Brass Knuckles Championship. He defended the belt against The Outpatient in a Falls Count Anywhere match on October 22. Another title defense at MWF's "Soul Survivor III", against The Missing Link, ended in a no-contest. He has called this the most favorite match of his career. Ferraro continued feuding with Ox Baker's Army for the remainder of the year defeating The Outpatient in a Cape Cod Collision match on November 11 and Makua in Falls Count Anywhere match on December 4, 2005.

=== CWA Montreal (2006) ===
At the start of 2006, Ferraro traveled to Canada to join CWA Montreal, one of two Canadian affiliates for AWA Superstars. On January 16, 2006, he retained the AWA Brass Knuckles Championship in a Bloodbath match against Pierre "The Beast" Vachon, however, he soon allied with The Vachon Brothers (Pierre and Damien Vachon) to form The Alliance of Violence. He and Pierre Vachon entered a Tag Team Turmoil championship tournament; they defeated Karnage and Abdul Hannish in the opening round (March 5), The Hellraisers (Pain and Mizery) in the semi-finals (March 19), and Necro Butcher and SeXXXy Eddy in the finals (April 8) to become the first-ever CWA Montreal Tag Team Championship.

Ferraro briefly returned to New England where he was awarded the NWW Undisputed Brass Knuckles title on May 6, 2006. He also entered a championship tournament for the NWW U.S. Heavyweight Championship. He defeated Dave Showtime in the opening round (May 6) but was eliminated in the semi-finals (May 7) by Eric Shred via disqualification. He also teamed with Ron Zombie to defeat Justin Credible and The Sandman in a Beds of Nails Death match for Powerhouse Wrestling a week later. On July 22, a tag team match against Karnage and Abdul Hannish ended in a no-contest when Ferraro turned against his partner Brick Crawford. Feuding with the heavyweight champion, he defeated Crawford for the CWA Montreal Heavyweight title on August 19, 2006.

=== Return to the independent circuit (2006) ===
Back in New England, Ferraro continued wrestling for local promotions. On September 23, 2006, he wrestled Greg "The Hammer" Valentine in a Dog Collar match for Powerhouse Wrestling. He also defended the NWW Brass Knuckles Championship against Moondog Maximus, losing to Maximus in a non-title match on October 7, before dropping the belt to Headshrinker Samu at an October 28 Ultimate Ring Wars show. Two months later, Ferraro wrestled Doink the Clown for USWF Championship Wrestling at the Irish American Club in Malden, Massachusetts.

=== Ultimate Ring Wars (2006-2007) ===
During 2006 and 2007 Ferraro worked with and performed many strongman feats with URW in the New England area. He wrestled several times in hardcore matches with Pierre the Beast Vachon.

=== Big Time Wrestling (2006–2007) ===
At the end of 2006, Ferraro joined the then recently revived Big Time Wrestling under Terry Allen. On December 1, he defeated Mister T.A. at The Castle of Knights in Chicopee, Massachusetts for the BTW United States Heavyweight Championship. Ferraro was the first wrestler to hold the belt in nearly three decades.

During the next few months under manager Johnny Fabulous, he defended the title against Purty Kurty Adonis, Doink the Clown, Big Bear Matoush, and Malice. He also lost to Mr. T.A. in two separate Dog Collar matches, but retained the U.S. title in both encounters. The latter match, which took place on September 1, 2007, was for Terry Allen's BTW Dog Collar title.

=== Powerhouse Wrestling (2007–2009) ===
Ferraro and Johnny Fabulous also appeared for Powerhouse Wrestling during this time. In the spring of 2007, he wrestled "Superfly" Jimmy Snuka and Jake "The Snake" Roberts, losing both matches. That summer, Ferraro enjoyed a brief reunion with The Vachon Brothers in Ultimate Ring Wars Wrestling when he turned on his partner Crazy Chainsaw Bastard during a May 19 tag team match against The Vachons. He and Pierre Vachon faced each other in a special 4-man battle royal, with Paulie Gilmore and Kahuko, two months later in New World Wrestling. Ferraro eventually defeated CCB in a Casket match on September 15, 2007. Days later in Powerhouse Wrestling, a match between Ferraro and Abdullah the Butcher, involving broken bottles, a screw driver, a bed of nails, and Abdullah's infamous fork, ended in a no-contest.

During this period, Ferraro joined the Men of Business with Big Business, Jimmy "Jact" Cash, Rocky Badabino, and Paul E. Normus. On January 19, 2008, he and Big Business lost to Don and Savio Vega in a Street Fight match. That fall, he defeated Spike Dudley in a Chain match. On September 26, 2009, he wrestled both New Jack and Powerhouse Wrestling Heavyweight Champion "The Punisher" Don Vega in two Steel Cage matches in Worcester, Massachusetts.

=== Return to BTW (2009) ===
On March 27, 2009, Ferraro wrestled "Sweet" Scott Ashworth in the opening bout for BTW's "Danbury Mania" held at the Danbury Arena in Danbury, Connecticut; in the semi-main event, a 12-man Royal Rumble-style "Danbury Dungeon of Doom Match", he and Team Fuller (Rick Fuller, Jack Maverick, Benny Jux, Roberto Rush, and Mister T.A.) were defeated by Team Incredible (Justin Credible, Spike Dudley, Eddy DelFonzo, Tony DelFonzo, Malice, and Scott Ashworth). Ferraro also had a brief stint in Maine's NWA On Fire. He made his first appearance on the February 21st 2009 edition of "NWA On Fire TV" as a guest on "Tommy's Corner" with host Tom Savoldi. He wrestled two matches for NWA On Fire TV, against "Boston Bad Boy" Jason Rumble and "Jivin" Jimmy Capone respectively, and remained undefeated during his time in the promotion. On July 12, Ferraro was inducted into the 2009 New England Pro Wrestling Hall of Fame by his one-time tag team partner Anthony Rufo.

Ferraro formed a successful tag team with former rival "Mr. T.A." Terry Allen in late 2009. Together they defeated Bam Bam Delfonso and Scott Ashworth (October 14), Balls Mahoney and Scott Ashworth in a hardcore match (November 14), and were joined by A.J. Mitrano in a 6-man tag team match against "Superfly" Jimmy Snuka, Spike Dudley, and Lone Star (November 20). The following night, the two were defeated by Snuka and Doink the Clown in Palmer, Massachusetts. On January 23, 2010, Ferraro teamed with Jimmy Cash and Kurt Von Schmidt in a six-man tag match and were defeated by Hacksaw Jim Duggan, Nikolai Volkoff, and Jay Jaillette in Worcester, Massachusetts. A year later, he and Tommy Mack also won the promotion's tag team titles from The Untouchables.

=== Return to CW (2010) ===
At Chaotic Wrestling's "Cold Fury 9: The Never-ending Chase" Ferraro was inducted into the Chaotic Wrestling Hall of Fame. The following month at "Cold Fury: Fallout" he had an in-ring confrontation with fellow CW Hall of Famer Demon Ortiz which ended with Ferraro knocking Ortiz to the mat with a headbutt to the sternum. On April 30, he and Ortiz met in the opening rounds of Chaotic Wrestling's Tournament of Champions which saw Ferraro defeat Ortiz in a No Holds Barred match. He then defeated Elia Markopoulos in the second round (May 21) before being eliminated by Handsome Johnny in the semi-finals (June 18) at "Breaking Point". A week earlier he had also lost to "The Golden Greek" Alex Arion via disqualification. On July 16, he was scheduled to wrestle his old rival Rick Fuller at the Polish American Veterans Club in Lowell, Massachusetts, however, this match never took place due to the interference of Max Bauer. At the end of the month, he defeated Elia Markopoulos in a rematch at the Elks Lodge in Woburn.

Ferraro eventually joined Demon Ortiz to form a new version of The Alliance of Violence later that year. On October 1, Ortiz confronted him during a match against Vortex. This was Ortiz' first appearance in the promotion since being injured by Ferraro back in April. As the two stared each other down, in preparation for a fight, Ortiz inexplicably attacked Ferraro's opponent causing a disqualification and left the ring together. The next night in Lawrence, he and Ortiz interfered in a tag team match between four young trainees from the Chaotic Training Center (Vortex & “Western Dragon” Wesley Thomas vs. Alec the Alien & Dudley DL Dawson) causing a no-contest when they attacked all four participants and the referee. At CW's "Lowell Street Fight", they wrestled Julian Starr and Chase Del Monte. On November 12, Ferraro was in Ortiz' corner in his match against Rick Fuller. They challenged Julian Starr and Matt Logan for the Chaotic Wrestling Tag Team Championship in Hudson, Massachusetts the next day, but were unable to win the belts. On December 3, 2010, The Alliance of Violence and Chase Del Monte & Rick Fuller battled to a double-countout at CW's "Fan Appreciation Night" in Lowell, Massachusetts. At the end of the year he was interviewed by The Eagle-Tribune while performing at a benefit show Salem police and firefighters at Drew Estate Cigars. He was also a guest on the Canadian internet radio show Rope2Rope Radio where he discussed the independent scene in the Northeast, promoting Chaotic Wrestling and a few other New England promotions, as well as his own wrestling career.

=== Independent Wrestling Entertainment (2010) ===
Ferraro spent the winter of 2010 in Maine working for Independent Wrestling Entertainment where he formed Primer Inc. with Johnny Primer. On September 24, Ferraro and Primer defeated Jim Capone and The Ninja for the IWE Tag Team Championship. A month later, they suffered a disqualification loss to Larry and Kyle Huntley (with Miss Jenna) in Brewer, Maine, but retained the tag titles. On November 5, 2010, Ferraro joined Donny Rotten, Iron Eagle, and "Redneck" Randy Walker in an 8-man Survivor Series match against The Huntleys and Public Works ("Roadblock" Mark Mahoney and John Bryar). Ferraro eliminated John Bryar and Kyle Huntley via pinfall before he himself was pinned by Larry Huntley. Although Huntly ended up being the lone survivor, Ferraro hit his opponent in the face with a fireball after the match. The following night in Brewer, while gloating about burning Larry Huntly during an in-ring promo, IWE Executive Director Quentin Michaels came out and ordered Primer Inc. to defend the tag titles in a No Rules Texas Tornado match against Kyle Huntley and a partner of his choice (which was revealed to be John Bryar). Two weeks later, Ferraro (with Ox Baker) defeated Adam Hastey via disqualification for All Out Mayhem in South Portland, Maine. He was also scheduled to take part in the 2nd annual Al Biondi Memorial Tournament on December 11, 2010.

=== Second return to CW (2011–present) ===
On January 21, 2011, Ferraro defeated Psycho at "Rival's Choice" in Lowell, Massachusetts. A month later at "Cold Fury X", he was the first entrant in the Royal Rumble-style "Classic Chaotic Countdown" and the first to be eliminated. This was done via outside interference from color commentator Rick Fuller, who Ferraro had been taunting, by pulling down the top rope and allowing Elia Markopoulos, Kid USA and Donnie Rotten to throw him out of the ring. He and Ortiz also took on Chaotic Wrestling Tag Team Champions The Logan Brothers (Bryan and Matt Logan) at Cold Fury: Fallout on March 4. but lost the match.

Ferraro took a few months off for a knee injury before returning to action in the fall. On October 4, 2011, Ferraro was a guest on the AngryMarks.com podcast Ring the Bell hosted by "Killa Kev" Fields, Mike Poulin, and Seth Drakin. He promoted an upcoming interpromotional show for Independent Wrestling Entertainment and NWA on Fire during the show, where he was to face former tag team partner Johnny Primer, as well discussed his recent appearances on Italian television and Stan Lee's Superhumans on the History Channel. After a five-year absence, Ferraro was also ranked #500 of the top 500 singles wrestlers in the 2011 PWI 500.

In early 2012, Ferraro also wrestled shows for Powerhouse Wrestling and UFO Wrestling. On April 20, 2012, Ferraro (with B.A. Tatum) defeated "The Sure Thing" Mark Shurman at the Elks Lodge in Woburn, Massachusetts. The next night in Gray, Maine, he defeated Larry Zbyszko to win the All Out Mayhem Heavyweight Championship after interference from John Cena Sr.

== Strongman career ==
Outside of professional wrestling, Ferraro is a real-life performing strongman. His demonstrations have included bending steel bars and breaking iron bars over his head, and headbutting and snapping a Louisville slugger in half with his skull. His specialty, however, is using his head to break various hard or heavy objects. He has had cinder blocks jack-hammered off his head, concrete blocks set on fire and broken over the side of his head using a sledge hammer, and having 16lb bowling balls dropped on his head from heights up to 15 feet. Ferraro has also used his forehead to drive spikes through 2x4s wrapped in sheet metal. Ferraro first discovered this ability as a teenager when, while chasing younger brother around the house during an argument, crashed head first into a large oak door.

Ferraro first gained notice in the New England area appearing on numerous cable-access sports and pro wrestling television programs in the region. He was also invited on WROR's "Loren and Wally show" in Burlington, Massachusetts where he performed "Feats of Strength" for guests and listeners. This led to further work in commercials which aired in Massachusetts and Central New England and later CMT's Country Fried Home Videos. He was also part of the 1999 strongmen documentary "Beyond Pain" by James W Kent.

His strongman demonstrations have been covered by The Boston Globe (New Hampshire edition), The Daily Item, Revere Journal, Silver City Bulletin, and The Sun Chronicle. Among his most notable performances include:

- 1999: Performing in a strongman demo at the Attleboro Armory in Attleboro, Massachusetts (attn. 500+)
- 1999: Performing an extreme strongman demonstration at The Hot Dog Safari (Suffolk Downs) in Revere, Massachusetts. (attn. 5,000)
- 2000: Performing an extreme strongman exhibition at WAAF's Locobazooka concert in Green Hill Park. (attn. 4,000)
- 2004: Performing his "Iron Head" demo at the NWA 56th Anniversary Show in Winnipeg, Manitoba.
- 2005: Performing his "Iron Head" demo at an NWA Tri-State live event in Glenville, Virginia. (attn. 1000+)

Ferraro was featured on the August 19th 2010 edition of The History Channel's Stan Lee's Superhumans. The episode examined his hard skull as well as attempted to explain how he performed his pro wrestling and strongman stunts. Ferraro was studied by Harvard Medical School which determined through an MRI that his skull measured 16mm thick, over 2.3 times more than the average human skull, making it one of the thickest skulls ever x-rayed. The show's host, legendary Marvel comic book writer Stan Lee, nicknamed Ferraro the "Human Anvil" which he has since adopted for his strongman performances. In addition, the episode's title ("Hammerhead") was named after him.

On April 14, 2011, Ferraro set a Guinness World Record for having 45 concrete slabs (15 stacks of 3 with an estimated combined weight of 1125 lbs.) broken over his head using 16 lbs. bowling balls that were dropped from a height of over ten feet. The bowling balls were dropped onto to head continuously for over three minutes. This performance took place in Milan, Italy and later aired on Canale 5's Guinness World Records TV series Lo show dei record. He also won the Chinese Martian Arts Association Iron Skills title in Long Island, New York.

That same year, he added a new attraction to his strongman performance, the "$5,000 Headbutt Challenge" in which members of the public would be given the chance to trade headbutts with the strongman. If they were successful in knocking him out, Ferraro would pay the winner $5,000. This was borrowed from a similar concept used in his pro wrestling career. As of May 2011, Ferraro has knocked out 11 would-be challengers from around the world. In an interview later that year he revealed he has been in negotiations to perform in Europe (France, Germany, and Poland) and Southeast Asia (Malaysia) and was also considering putting together an act for America's Got Talent and The X-Factor.

== Championships and accomplishments ==
- All Star Wrestling Federation
  - ASWF Hardcore Championship (1 time)
- AWA Superstars
  - AWA Brass Knuckles Championship (1 time)
- Big Time Wrestling
  - BTW United States Championship (1 time)
- Chaotic Wrestling
  - Chaotic Wrestling Heavyweight Championship (2 times)
  - Chaotic Wrestling Tag Team Championship (1 time) - with Joe Poe
  - Chaotic Wrestling Hall of Fame (Class of 2010)
  - Feud of the Year (2000) The Millenium Killaz vs. One Night Stand
  - Match of the Year (2000) vs. Jay Jaillette
  - Wrestler of the Year (2001)
  - Best Moment of the Year (2001) King of Chaos
  - Match of the Year (2001) vs. Ali Mohammed, Jamie Paine, and Nemesis at King of Chaos
  - Best Theme Music (2001) GI-NO MAR-TINO
- CWA Montreal
  - CWA Montreal Heavyweight Championship (1 time)
  - CWA Montreal Tag Team Championship (1 time) – with Pierre Vachon
- International Independent Wrestling
  - IIW Street Fight Championship (1 time)
  - IIW Tag Team Championship (1 time) – with Ali Mohammed
  - IIW Tag Team of the Year (2000) – with Ali Mohammed
- Independent Wrestling Alliance
  - IWA Heavyweight Championship (1 time)
- Independent Wrestling Entertainment
  - IWE Tag Team Championship (1 time) – with Johnny Primer
  - IWE Heavyweight Champion (1 time)***
- New England Informer
  - Wrestler of the Month (November 2000)
- New England Pro Wrestling Hall of Fame
  - Class of 2009
- NWA New England
  - NWA New England Heavyweight Championship (1 time)
  - NWA New England Colonial Heavyweight Championship (1 time)
  - NWA New England Brass Knuckles Championship (3 times)
  - NWA New England Tag Team Championship (1 time) – with Ali Mohammed
  - Tony Rumble Memorial Rumble winner (2004) – co-winner with The Dungeon Master
- New World Wrestling
  - NWW Undisputed Brass Knuckles Championship (1 time)
  - NWW Tag Team Championship (1 time) – with Ali Mohammed
- New Wrestling Horizons
  - NWH Tag Team Championship (1 time) – with Danny Dangerous
- Powerhouse Wrestling
  - Powerhouse Wrestling Tag Team Championship (1 time) – with Tommy Mack
- Power League Wrestling
  - PLW Heavyweight Championship (1 time)
  - PLW Award for Best Newcomer (1998)
- Primal Conflict Wrestling
  - PCW Tag Team Championship (2 times) – with Ali Mohammed
- Pro Wrestling Illustrated
  - Ranked No. 460 of the top 500 wrestlers in the PWI 500 in 2002
- Ultimate Championship Wrestling
  - UCW Heavyweight Championship (1 time)
  - UCW Tag Team Championship (1 time) – with Ali Mohammed
- Unified Championship Wrestling
  - UCW Heavyweight Championship (1 time)
  - UCW Tag Team Championship (1 time) – with Ali Mohammed
- World Independent Wrestling
  - WIW Heavyweight Championship (2 times)
- Wrestling Attic
  - Most Dangerous Wrestler In New England
- Other titles
  - ASIATIC Heavyweight Championship (1 time)
  - AWF Hardcore Championship (1 time)
