= Vachon Brothers =

Professional wrestling tag team

Tag team
- Members: Pierre Vachon; Damien Vachon; Barry Ace (manager – NWA-NE); Julius Sweet (manager – ECCW); The Pink Assassin (manager – MWF)
- Name(s): Alliance of Violence; The Vachon Brothers
- Billed heights: Pierre: 6 ft 1 in (1.85 m); Damien: 5 ft 9 in (1.75 m)
- Combined billed weight: 600 lb (270 kg); Pierre: 390 lb (180 kg); Damien: 210 lb (95 kg)
- Billed from: Montreal, Quebec, Canada
- Former members: Gino Martino
- Debut: 2005
- Disbanded: 2007

The Vachon Brothers (sometimes simply billed as The Vachons) was a professional wrestling tag team composed of Pierre "The Beast" Vachon and Damien "The Pitbull" Vachon. They were one of the leading "heel" teams on the independent circuit during the mid-2000s and, at one point, held the tag team titles of seven different promotions in both eastern Canada and the Northeastern United States, most notably, twice winning the NWA New England Tag Team Championship in 2005 and 2006. Although both men have been reported as the real-life youngest sons of legendary Canadian wrestler Paul "The Butcher" Vachon, neither are near relations of the Vachon wrestling family.

They were occasionally joined by Gino Martino, and collectively known as the Alliance of Violence, in CWA Montreal, the official eastern Canada affiliate for AWA Superstars, and other promotions; Martino and Pierre Vachon were the promotion's first-ever tag team champions upon winning the belts in 2006. The Vachons also worked for East Coast Championship Wrestling, Great Canadian Wrestling, the Millennium Wrestling Federation, the National Wrestling Alliance, specifically NWA Green Mountain, NWA: Extreme Canadian Championship Wrestling, and NWA New England, and Paulie Gilmore's New World Wrestling.

== History ==
=== Early career ===
A native of Burlington, Vermont, Pierre Vachon (born Chad Peeters) made his pro debut in 2003. He met Damien Vachon while wrestling in NWA Green Mountain and, in early 2005, the two began teaming together as the Vachon Brothers. This was a homage to the original Vachon brothers, Paul "Butcher" Vachon and Maurice "Mad Dog" Vachon. They gained early notoriety as second-generation wrestlers of Paul Vachon.

=== NWA New England (2005) ===
While wrestling for NWA Green Mountain, The Vachons also competed for NWA New England in the Greater Boston area where they were managed by Barry Ace. On May 22, 2005, Pierre and Damian Vachon defeated NWA New England Tag Team Champions The Rough Ryders (Nyxx and Devin Raines) in Everett, Massachusetts, a three-way match also involving the Big Islanders (Makua and Ka Hoku).

Representing Green Mountain Wrestling at NWA Top Rope's "Road to the Convention", held at Nation Guard Armory in Lebanon, the Vachons challenged Really Sensational ("Real Deal" Jay Davis and "Sensational" Sean Reed) for the GMW Tag Team Championship; as a result of their victory over Davis and Reed, The Vachons became GMW's first-ever tag team champions in addition to holding the NWA New England titles. They lost the NWA New England tag titles to The Elite (Sonny Roselli and Larry Huntley) at the NWA 57th Annual Convention in Springfield, Tennessee the next day; this was also a three-way match with the Big Islanders.

That summer, The Vachons feuded with Gino Martino in NWA New England and various independents. On June 10, Pierre Vachon unsuccessfully challenged Martino in a Fans Bring the Weapons match for the NWA New England Heavyweight Championship; he had previously wrestled Martino for the title in a barbed-wire chain death match four months earlier. Pierre also lost to Martino and Dave Donavan in a three-way "broken bottle" death match to crown the first All Star Wrestling Federation Hardcore Champion on July 16, 2005. On August 5, The Vachons wrestled Martino (with The Iron Sheik) in separate singles matches at an event for the Millennium Wrestling Federation; Gino defeated Damian Vachon in a standard wrestling match and Pierre Vachon in an Anything Goes match.

=== Independent circuit (2005) ===
The Vachons continued to split their time between the independents in eastern Canada, specifically Ontario and Quebec, and the Northeastern United States. Pierre Vachon was also active on the New York independent circuit during this time. At a September 23 show for World Of Hurt Wrestling, he wrestled WOHW Hardcore Champion Punk in Hudson Falls, New York.

The Vachons lost the NWA Green Mountain Tag Team titles to Franz and Hanz Roddy in Hyde Park, Vermont on October 29, however, they continued to win titles in most of the promotions they worked in (often as the inaugural champions). At one point, they held the tag team belts of seven different promotions in Canada and the US including the All Star Wrestling Federation, CWA Montreal, East Coast Championship Wrestling, NWA Green Mountain, NWA New England, New World Wrestling, and Revival Championship Wrestling. The Vachons also wrestled in Millennium Wrestling Federation where they were members of Ox Baker's Army with The Outpatient and The Islanders. On November 5, Pierre Vachon and Ox Baker's Army lost to Todd Hanson, Beau Douglas, The Sandman, and Paulie Gilmore in a "Lynn Street Fight" match at MWF's "Soul Survivor III" in Lynn, Massachusetts; this match marked the official end to the two-year feud between Ox Baker's Army and Todd Hanson. At an RCW show the following night, The Vachons wrestled Makua of the Big Islanders (with Joe Rules) in a handicap match in Pawcatuck, Connecticut.

=== CWA Montreal (2005–2006) ===
At the end of 2005, The Vachon Brothers made their debut in Championship Wrestling Association, or CWA Montreal, one of two Canadian affiliates for AWA Superstars. On December 10, 2005, they defeated The Enforcer and "Asian Nightmare" Kwan Chang in a Street Fight match in Montreal, Quebec. It was in CWA Montreal that the Vachons resumed their feud with Gino Martino as, on January 16, 2006, Pierre wrestled their longtime rival in a Bloodbath match for the CWA Montreal Brass Knuckles Championship. Within two months, however, the Vachons unexpectedly joined Martino to form the "Alliance of Violence".

Pierre Vachon and Gino Martino entered a championship tournament together to decide the first CWA Montreal Tag Team Champions. They defeated Karnage and Abdul Hannish in the opening rounds (March 5), The Hellraisers (Pain & Mizery) in the semi-finals (March 19), and Necro Butcher and SeXXXy Eddy in the finals at CWA Montreal's "kNOw FEAR" (April 8). Meanwhile, both the Vachons also took part in the title tournament for the CWA Montreal Internet Championship; Damien Vachon defeated Osirus and Pierre Vachon beat "Iron" Mike Lyons in the opening rounds but were both eliminated in the semi-finals by Brick Crawford and Karnage (the latter in a Dog Collar match) respectively.

=== NWA New England (2006) ===
The Vachons returned to NWA New England in the summer of 2006. On May 11, they regained the NWA New England Tag Team titles by defeating 5–0 (Trooper Gilmore and Corporal Johnson) in Fall River, Massachusetts. They remained champions for over a month before dropping the belts to The Big Islanders (Makua and Kahoku) in Revere on June 24, 2006.

=== Independent circuit (2006–2007) ===
The Vachons spent the next year or so on the Ontario and New England independent circuits. They briefly returned to CWA Montreal, both largely in singles competition, with Damian Vachon feuding with CWA Montreal iTV Champion Karnage. Though he defeated Karnage, via countout and disqualification victories, he was unable to capture the title. They also appeared for NWA: Extreme Canadian Championship Wrestling in October and Mecca Pro Wrestling's "Redemption" in Cornwall, Ontario on November 11. A few weeks later, after a five-month title reign, The Vachons dropped the NWW Tag Team Championship to The Slaughterhouse (Outpatient and Crazy Chainsaw Bastard) in a "Christmas Carnage" hardcore match in Attleboro, Massachusetts. At the end of the month, they wrestled The HellRaisers (Payne and Myzery) at Great Canadian Wrestling's "Seasons Beatings" in Oshawa, Ontario.

At the beginning of 2007, The Vachons were back in the US. At a February 17 show for Grapple Masters Wrestling in Bristol, Vermont, The Vachons were supposed to appear for the show's opening promo. When the team was introduced, however, their rivals The Hellraisers come out instead. The Hellraisers began picking on a fan in the crowd, Albert, but then invited him to join them in the ring. They continued talking to Albert until the young man said he was a fan of The Vachons causing The Hellraisers to attack him. The Vachons then ran to the ring to chase off The Hellraisers setting up two singles matches between the four wrestlers later that night. The match series ended in a tie with Hellraiser Misery defeating Damien Vachon in a Tables match and Pierre Vachon winning a Thumbtacks match against Hellraiser Pain. Both teams were scheduled to meet in a Dog Collar match for the GMW Tag Team Championship on March 10.

On March 24, The Vachons were booked to face each other in a four-way Gladiator Scramble match, also involving Hybrid Rain and Professor Adib Monsour, for Elite Wrestling Action "Reckon This" in Cornwall, Ontario, its first show after a three-year absence. This was one of two scramble matches held to decide the opponents for the main event with the winner receiving the EWA Heavyweight Championship. The participants for both matches were changed prior to the event, however, which saw Soulrage pin Damien Vachon (also involving Dave Titan and Hellraizor Myzery) and Pierre Vachon pin "White Lion" Jim Tanner (also involving Prof. Adib Mansour and Hellraizor Payne). In the main event later that night, officiated by special guest referee Sakrilige, Soulrage ended up pinning Pierre Vachon to win the EWA Heavyweight Championship. A week later, Pierre Vachon lost to King Kong Bundy at a New World Wrestling event in East Sandwich, Massachusetts.

In the next few months, The Vachons also visited Great Canadian Wrestling, Powerhouse Wrestling, Tri-State Wrestling, and Ultimate Ring Wars Wrestling. It was at URWW's May 19 show "In Your Face!" in Somerset, Massachusetts that the "Alliance of Violence" was reformed when Gino Martino turned on his tag team partner Crazy Chainsaw Bastard during a tag team match against the Vachons. They also returned to East Coast Championship Wrestling where, under manager Julius Sweet, the Vachons unsuccessfully attempted to regain the ECCW Tag Team Championship from Nick Neighborhood and Chuck Deep. Both teams met at the Blackstone Valley Regional Vocational Technical High School in Upton, Massachusetts on June 2, and after losing to Neighborhood and Deep, attacked their opponents after the match.

=== Slam All-Star Wrestling (2007) ===
The Vachons spent their last months as a tag team in Slam All-Star Wrestling. Pierre Vachon had previously wrestled in a three-way tag match with Aftershock against Those 80's Guys (Vince and Reed) and TDS Inc. (Slick and Mackie Schrody) at their April 21 show "Intriguing Circumstances" in Highgate, Vermont. The Vachon Brothers made their SAW debut at the "Slam Summer Spectacular" on July 14, 2007, where they wrestled The Alden Brothers (Shane and Eric Alden) (with The Director) and Those 80's Guys for the SAW Tag Team Championship. This would end up being their last match together as Damien Vachon suddenly left the promotion. Left by himself, Pierre Vachon took on The Alden Brothers in a handicap match at "Franklin County Face Off" on August 4. Pierre quickly formed a new tag team, The New School Wrestling Crew, with Jim Tanner and together defeated SAW Tag Team Champions The Alden Brothers by disqualification at the "September Super Show" on September 8, 2007.

== Post-breakup ==
=== Pierre Vachon (2008–present) ===
After parting ways in SAW, Pierre Vachon began competing on the local independent circuit in Upstate New York. On April 4, 2008, he participated in an interpromotional show for ADK Wrestling and Top Rope Promotions, wrestling against Joe Sidusky, at Fort Edward High School. That summer, Vachon reformed the New School Wrestling Crew with Jim Tanner and wrestled shows at the Adirondack Sports Complex in Queensbury, New York for both ADK Wrestling and Continental Wrestling Promotions. He also made a brief return to SAW for its last show of the season, defeating "Shooter" Anthony Storm in a singles match, on September 27, 2008. He also made occasional returns to the New England area for Top Rope Promotions.

On May 9, 2009, Vachon took part in a special benefit show, "Reality Rumble III", co-hosted by South Atlantic Wrestling and Entertainers That Care. It was held at Louisa County High School in Mineral, Virginia to raise money for a 6-year-old boy suffering from eosinophilic esophagitis; his medical expenses had exceeded over $2 million. In addition to the many wrestling stars performing at the event, including Ring of Honor's Damien Wayne and WWE's Al Snow, a number of actors, fashion models, musicians, reality tv stars, and other celebrities were also in attendance; Ray and Deana Housteau from The Amazing Race 7, Team Kentucky from The Amazing Race 10, David and Mary Conley from The Amazing Race: All-Stars, Kim Fore from ABC's Dance Machine, Rebekah Cantrell from A Double Shot at Love, Roq M of From G’s to Gents, Steve "Chicken" Morris from Survivor: China, Billy Garcia and Cristina Coria from Survivor: Cook Islands, Jessica Kiper from Survivor: Gabon, Tracy Hughes-Wolf from Survivor: Micronesia, Jenna and Matsuflex from VH1's Tool Academy, and Ariel Tweto from ABC's Wipeout.

Vachon continued wrestling in the Northeast US wrestling for Slam All-Star Wrestling, where he won the SAW Heavyweight Championship in 2009, and New York's In Your Face Wrestling where he teamed with Jim Tanner and Vigo during 2010. He joined forces with Vigo while engaging in a two-on-one feud with then IYFW Tag Team Champions The International Ego Trip (The Northern Studd and Fronz Roddy). Vachon defeated both Roddy and The Northern Studd in singles matches at IYFW's "Hanging By A Thread" (February 6) and Unsportsmanlike Conduct! (March 20) respectively before challenging the two men to a title match at the next show. The New School Wrecking Crew were scheduled to wrestle IYFW Tag Team Champions The Grindhouse (Maxx Burton and CJ Scott) and The International Ego Trip (The Northern Studd and Fronz Roddy) in a three-way match at April 17 "Amsterdamage" show in Amsterdam, New York, however, both Vachon and Tanner were unable to wrestle due to injuries; it was during the match that The Northern Studd and Fronz Roddy won the tag titles. Vachon chose Vigo as his partner to wrestle the new tag team champions at the 2010 Coronation Cup tournament on June 12. Vachon and Vigo defeated Fronz Roddy and The Northern Studd via disqualification, however, the team retained the championship. Vachon, egged on by Maxx Burton, blamed Vigo for costing them their chance to win the belts and attacked his tag team partner after the match.

Pierre Vachon and Maxx Burton continued feuding with Vigo throughout the year. On December 11, 2010, he and Burton wrestled Vigo and Tito Santana at IYFW's "Controlled Chaos!" in Saratoga Springs, New York. They lost the bout when Santana made Burton submit to a figure four leglock. On January 14, 2012, Vachon defeated Drake Evans at an IYFW show in Ballston Spa, New York.

=== Damien Vachon (2009–present) ===
Damien Vachon returned to Canada and took a year off before resurfacing on the Ontario independents in late 2009. On November 13, 2009, he appeared at Stellar Wrestling Showcase's "November Reign" show in Prescott, Ontario where he and Portia Perez lost to Jaguar and Josianne The Pussycat (with special guest manager Persephene) in a mixed tag team match; after their loss, Vachon attacked Josianne and put the female wrestler in a piledriver. That same month, he wrestled Myzery The Barbarian in a "VIP dark match" at C*4's "Only The Best" in Ottawa and teamed with Bull McGuire against The Incredible Hunks (Cheeky and Deeno) at Ontario Championship Wrestling's "Wreckage" in Kingston, Ontario. He later interjected himself during the main event to rescue Myzery the Barbarian from a gang attack by "The Don" Sak Daddy and his allies.

The two men soon began teaming together as "The Barberians". On January 2, 2010, at OCW's "Hangover" show, he and Mysery were disqualified in their match against the 5th Avenue Mob. Vachon was similarly disqualified when he refused to release a chokehold on his opponent at Stellar Wrestling Showcase's March 20 show "Tik Tok" in Prescott. That same month, he and Mysery entered a championship tournament to crown the first OCW Tag Team Champions. At OCW's "Tag Team Turmoil" on March 27, the team defeated The Incredible Hunks (Cheeky and Deeno) in the semi-finals and Lonely At The Top (with Persephone Vice) in the tournament finals to win the belts. On May 29, Vachon wrestled at two shows on the same night; a tag team title defense against the 5ifth Avenue Mob (McGuire and Manson) (with Sak Daddy and Savannah) ended in a no-contest at OCW's "Aftermath" in Kingston and at "Eat This" for Mecca Pro Wrestling in Cornwall Vachon defeated "The Fabulous French Canadian" Eric Mastrocola.

On July 30, 2010, a reunion of sorts occurred at "Summer Bash" for Morrisburg Pro Wrestling when The Barbarians took part in a Triple Threat match against Pierre Vachon & Firestorm and The Incredible Hunks (Deeno & Cheeky) to earn a shot against Demolition (Demolition Ax and Demolition Smash) in the main event, a match with both Vachons lost. Also at the show were former World Wrestling Federation stars Brutus "The Barber" Beefcake, Doink the Clown, and Rick "The Model" Martel. The following night, Damien Vachon defeated Eric Mastrocola (with Frank Couture) at Mecca Pro Wrestling's "Damage Control" to become the first-ever MPW Heavyweight Champion. He defended the belt for almost five months, as well as wrestling for Ontario Championship Wrestling and Acclaim Pro Wrestling, until being stripped of the title by General Manager Nic Paterson at MPW's "Backfire" on November 20, 2010, when he was unable to compete due to injury.

== Championships and accomplishments ==
- All Star Wrestling Federation
  - ASWF Tag Team Championship (1 time)
- East Coast Championship Wrestling
  - ECCW Tag Team Championship (2 times)
- NWA Green Mountain
  - NWA Green Mountain Tag Team Championship (1 time)
- NWA New England
  - NWA New England Tag Team Championship (2 times)
- New World Wrestling
  - NWW Tag Team Championship (1 time)
- Revival Championship Wrestling
  - RCW Tag Team Championship (1 time)
- Other titles
  - ACW Tag Team Championship (1 time)

=== Alliance of Violence ===
- Championship Wrestling Association
  - CWA Montreal Tag Team Championship (1 time) – Pierre Vachon and Gino Martino

=== Damien Vachon ===
- New World Wrestling
  - NWW United States Championship (1 time)
- Ontario Championship Wrestling
  - OCW Tag Team Championship (1 time) – with Myzery

=== Pierre Vachon ===
- Mecca Pro Wrestling
  - MPW Heavyweight Championship (1 time)
- NWA Green Mountain
  - NWA Green Mountain Television Championship (1 time)
- Slam All-Star Wrestling
  - SAW Heavyweight Championship (1 time)
