= AWA Brass Knuckles Championship =

Professional wrestling championship

Details
- Promotion: American Wrestling Association (AWA)
- Date established: February 12, 1979
- Date retired: May 1981
Statistics
- First champion: Don Fargo
- Most reigns: N/A
- Longest reign: Don Fargo (595 days)
- Shortest reign: Gino Martino (176 days)

The AWA World Brass Knuckles Championship was a professional wrestling championship owned by the American Wrestling Association (AWA) promotion. The championship was introduced on February 12, 1979, at a Mid-South Coliseum live event. It was active until May 1981 when the title belt was abandoned after Crusher Lisowski left the promotion.

It debuted as a part of a storyline to introduce Don Fargo to the Memphis wrestling territory; this allowed Fargo to challenge various wrestlers in hardcore-themed matches. Like most professional wrestling "brass knuckle" championships, both wrestlers would heavily tape their fists to give the impression that each participant was wearing brass knuckles; the title was generally defended in no-disqualification matches and it was legal to punch an opponent. Fargo and Lisowski were the only champions.

== History ==
The AWA Brass Knuckles Championship was first defended on February 12, 1979, at the Mid-South Coliseum, in a match between Don Fargo and Robert Gibson. Fargo was billed by the promotion as the "World Brass Knuckles Champion", however, the title mostly defended in the Continental Wrestling Association. Together with manager Al Greene, Fargo would use the title to engage in wild brawls with other stars of the Memphis territory. During his 1979-80 run with the CWA and his brother Jackie Fargo were allies of Jerry "The King" Lawler; Fargo also formed tag teams Chris Colt, The Destroyer, and Dennis Condrey. One of his most notable matches as AWA Brass Knuckles Champion was against Jimmy Valiant on September 29, 1980, who defeated Fargo via disqualification. The title was abandoned after Fargo left the Memphis territory at the end of the month.

On October 20, 1980, Crusher Lisowski won the vacant title after defeating "Crusher" Jerry Blackwell in St. Paul, Minnesota. Lisowski defended the title in the American Wrestling Association for five months until leaving the promotion in the summer of 1981, after having suffered a career-ending injury at the hands of Jerry Blackwell, and the title became abandoned once again.

== Reigns ==
Don Fargo was the first champion in the title's history. He also held the record for longest reign at 595 days.

== Title history ==
Key
No.	Overall reign number
Reign	Reign number for the specific champion
Days	Number of days held

No.	Champion	Championship change			Reign statistics		Notes	Ref.
No.	Champion	Date	Event	Location	Reign	Days	Notes	Ref.
1	Don Fargo	February 12, 1979	Live event	Memphis, TN	1	595	Don Fargo is billed as champion upon entering the promotion.	
—	Deactivated	October 1980	—	—	—	—	The title is abandoned after Don Fargo leaves the Continental Wrestling Association.	
2	Crusher Lisowski	October 12, 1980	Live event	Saint Paul, MN	1			
—	Deactivated	May 1981	—	—	—	—	The title is abandoned after Crusher Lisowski leaves the American Wrestling Association.	
