= NWA Colonial Heavyweight Championship =

Professional wrestling championship

Details
- Promotion: NWA New England
- Date established: November 20, 2004
- Date retired: August 20, 2005.
Statistics
- First champion(s): Gino Martino
- Final champion(s): Dan Bidondi

The NWA New England Colonial Championship was a short-lived secondary singles wrestling title in the NWA New England. It was first won by Gino Martino, who was awarded the title after winning the annual Tony Rumble Memorial Battle Royal in Bellingham, Massachusetts on November 20, 2004. The title was co-promoted with a local promotion, New World Wrestling, and defended in both promotions during an eight-month period before being merged with the NWW Heavyweight Championship in August 2005.

== Title history ==
Silver areas in the history indicate periods of unknown lineage.

Wrestler:	Times:	Date:	Location:	Notes:
NWA New England Championship
Gino Martino	1	November 20, 2004	Bellingham, Massachusetts	Won the Tony Rumble Memorial Battle Royal and becomes the first NWA New England Colonial Heavyweight Champion.
Title is vacated on February 4, 2005, after Gino Martino wins the NWA New England Heavyweight Championship.
Dan Bidondi	1	February 5, 2005	Bellingham, Massachusetts	Defeats Donny Rotten, Don Vega, and Chris Blackheart in a Four Way match at Extreme Revenge to win vacant title.
Title is awarded to NWW Heavyweight Champion Beau Douglas when Bidondi failed to make a scheduled title defence at the Summer Blackout supercard in Attleboro, Massachusetts on August 20, 2005. NWA New England and New World Wrestling ended their association after this event and the title was eventually merged with the NWW Heavyweight Championship.
