= Tommaso Ciampa =

American professional wrestler (born 1985)

- Ciampa in 2025

Personal information
- Born: Tommaso Whitney; May 8, 1985 (age 41) Boston, Massachusetts, U.S.
- Spouse: Jessie Ward (m. 2013)
- Children: 1

Professional wrestling career
- Ring name(s): Ciampa; Demarso Whitney; Dr. Thomas; Prodigy; Thomas Penmanship; Thomas Whitney, Esq; Tommaso Ciampa; Tommy Penmanship
- Billed height: 5 ft 11 in (180 cm)
- Billed weight: 208 lb (94 kg)
- Billed from: Boston, Massachusetts
- Trained by: Killer Kowalski; Mike Hollow; Harley Race; Al Snow
- Debut: January 2005

Tommaso Whitney (born May 8, 1985), better known by the ring name Tommaso Ciampa (/ˈtʃɑːmpʌ/), is an American professional wrestler. As of January 2026, he is signed to All Elite Wrestling (AEW), where he is a former AEW National Champion and a former AEW TNT Champion.

Trained by Harley Race and Killer Kowalski, Whitney began his career in 2005, working on several independent promotions. He landed in Ring of Honor (ROH) in 2011, and soon became part of The Embassy. He won the ROH World Television Championship once while as a member. At this time, Ciampa also worked for several other independent promotions, including Beyond Wrestling, Chaotic Wrestling, Top Rope Promotions (TRP), and Pro Wrestling Guerrilla (PWG).

After his ROH contract expired, he later appeared on WWE in 2015 as part of the Dusty Rhodes Tag Team Classic. He formed a tag team, #DIY (Do It Yourself), with Johnny Gargano, whom he had wrestled against and with on the independent circuit numerous times. The following year, he signed a contract with WWE and participated in the Cruiserweight Classic, but Gargano defeated him in the first round. He was appointed to the developmental brand, NXT, and he and Gargano won the NXT Tag Team Championship by defeating The Revival in November 2016. After splitting from Gargano in 2017, he went on to become a two-time NXT Champion. In 2022, he was called up to main roster for the Raw brand and eventually reunited with Gargano in 2023, and went on to win the WWE Tag Team Championship twice in 2024 on SmackDown. After his WWE contract expired in January 2026, he signed with AEW that same month.

== Early life ==
Tommaso Whitney was born on May 8, 1985, in Boston, Massachusetts. He is of Sicilian descent.

== Professional wrestling career ==
=== Early career (2005–2007) ===
Whitney was trained by WWE Hall of Famer Killer Kowalski, and debuted in January 2005. He predominantly wrestled for independent promotions located in Massachusetts, most notably Chaotic Wrestling and Top Rope Promotions.

On May 22, 2005, he wrestled an IWF Junior Heavyweight Championship match against champion Sean Royal, but was unsuccessful. Later that day he also failed to win a battle royal to earn the number one contendership to the IWF Heavyweight Championship.

Whitney debuted in Chaotic Wrestling as "Tommy Penmanship" in 2005. On April 1, he lost a qualifying match for entry in the Chaotic Wrestling Heavyweight Championship Tournament to Fred Sampson. In June, Penmanship teamed with Arch Kincaid to unsuccessfully challenge the Logan Brothers for the Chaotic Wrestling Tag Team Championship. Penmanship won his first championship on August 8, by defeating Chase del Monte for the Chaotic Wrestling New England Championship. He held it for half a year, successfully defending it against former del Monte, Jason Blade, and Psycho, before eventually losing it to Psycho at Cold Fury 5.

Penmanship then spent a couple of months without winning a singles match losing to Matt Logan and Psycho, but alongside Psycho, he won a Lethal Lottery Tournament first round match. Penmanship and Psycho qualified for a battle royal to determine the number one contender to the CW Heavyweight Championship, but the match was won by Luis Ortiz. At Breaking Point 2006 Penmanship lost to Psycho once again in a Psycho Rules match with Tommy Dreamer as the special referee. On May 19, Penmanship defeated Handsome Johnny and became Chaotic Wrestling Heavyweight Champion. As the Chaotic Heavyweight champion Penmanship defeated Bryan Logan, del Monte and Max Bauer. He held the Championship until February 2007, when he lost it to Brian Milonas in a "Loser leaves CW" match.

=== WWE (2005–2007) ===
He appeared on the July 14, 2005, episode of SmackDown! as Thomas Whitney, ESQ, Muhammad Hassan's lawyer and confronted The Undertaker. Tommaso read a statement from Hassan before being attacked by The Undertaker. On the December 17 episode of Velocity, under the ring name Demarso Whitney, he was defeated by Jamie Noble. On the August 25, 2006, episode of Heat he and Kofi Kingston had a dark match against Lance Cade and Trevor Murdoch.

On February 4, 2007, it was announced that Whitney signed a developmental contract with WWE and was sent to Ohio Valley Wrestling. He debuted on February 21 and wrestled as Tommaso. After suffering an injury, he was forced to step away from in ring competition and became known as Dr. Thomas, Anger Management Specialist – during which time he managed Bolin Services (Charles Evans and Justin LaRouche), winning the OVW tag team titles. Dr Thomas would eventually make his in ring debut during a 6-man tag at Six Flags, tagging with Bolin Services to take on Elijah Burke and Cryme Tyme. On June 27, 2007, Whitney debuted a new gimmick when he began wrestling under a mask as Prodigy. On August 9, Whitney was released from his WWE developmental contract.

=== Independent circuit (2007–2016) ===
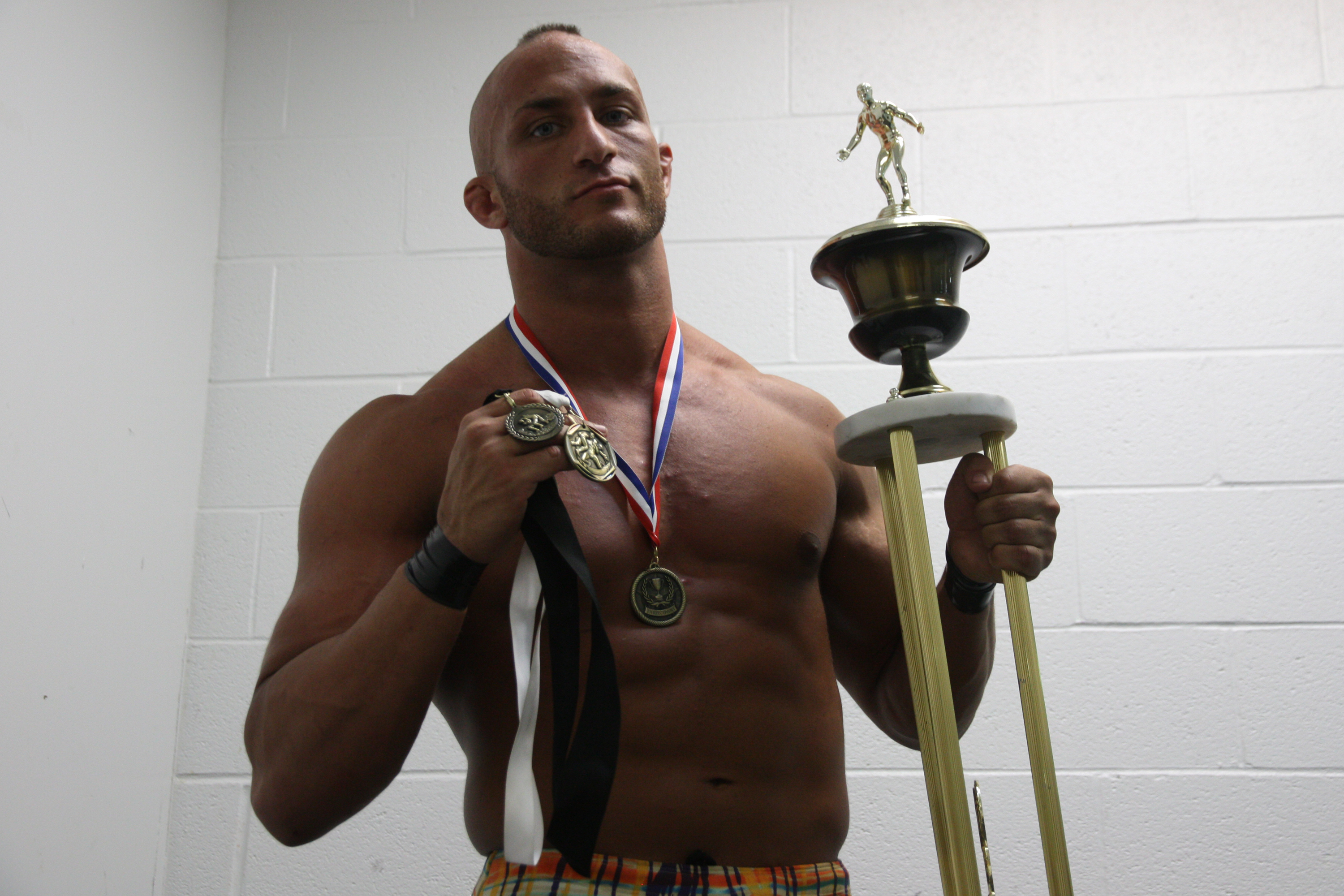
Ciampa holding the award for winning the ECWA Super 8 Tournament in 2011

In late 2007, he returned to the independent circuit. On September 29 Tommaso defeated A.J. Styles and Eddie Edwards to become the MWF Television Champion.

In September 2008 Ciampa debuted in Harley Race's World League Wrestling. In October he took part in Nine Man Battle Royal for the vacant WLW Heavyweight Championship, which was won by Go Shiozaki. Ciampa also unsuccessfully challenged WLW Tag Team Championship twice: on November 22, 2008, alongside Steve Anthony and on March 21, 2009, alongside Marc Godeker.

After returning to New England in 2008, Ciampa went on to compete in the ECWA Super 8 Tournament in 2009 and 2010 before finally winning the tournament in 2011 when he defeated Adam Cole.

On August 30, 2013, Ciampa made his debut for Pro Wrestling Guerrilla (PWG), when he entered the 2013 Battle of Los Angeles, losing to Brian Cage in his first round match.

=== Ring of Honor (2011–2015) ===
At Honor Reclaims Boston he, Alex Payne and Ernie Osiris lost a dark match to Bobby Dempsey, Grizzly Redwood and Rhett Titus. Ciampa appeared in dark matches for Ring of Honor in both 2007 and 2009.

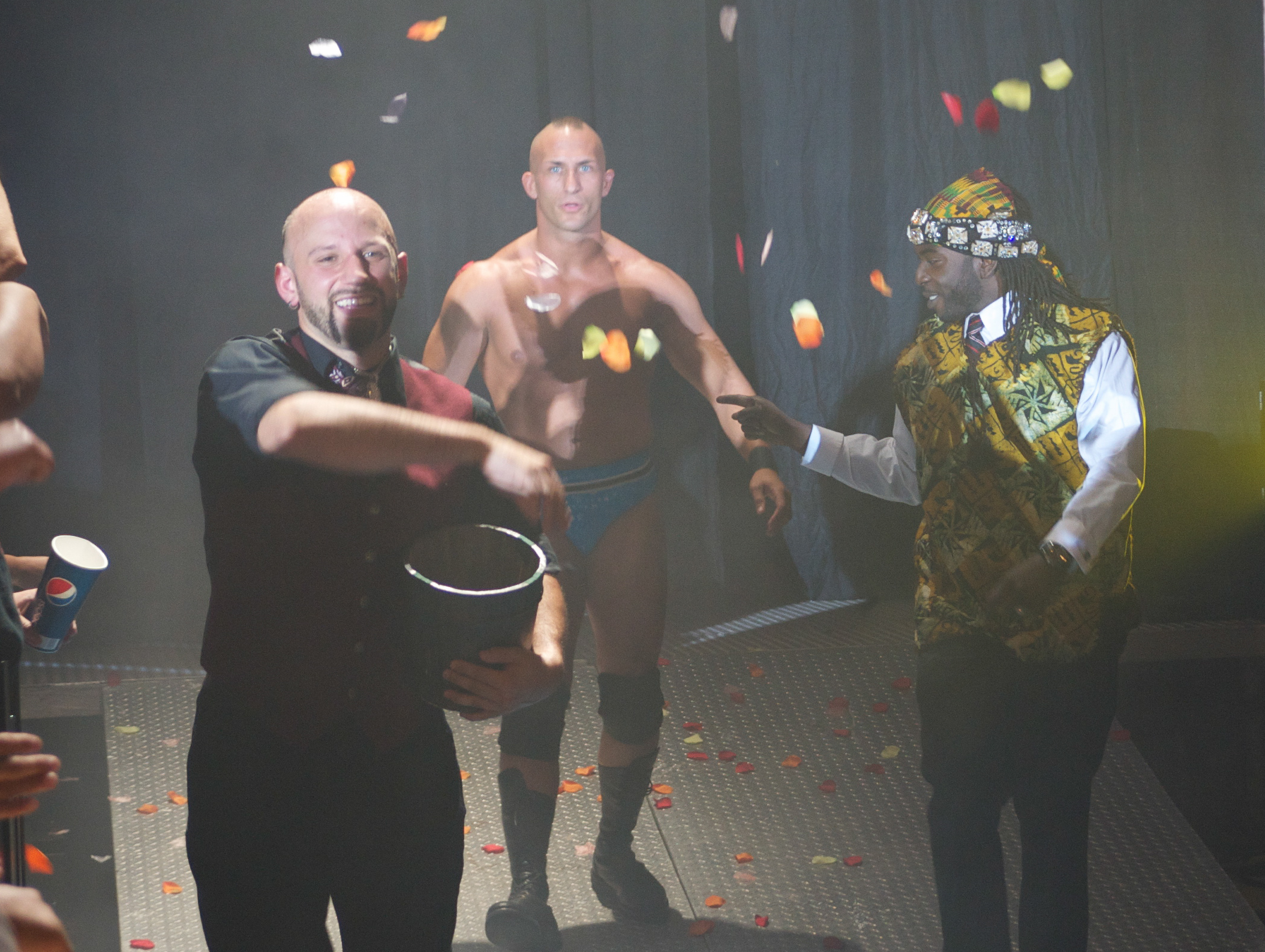
Ciampa (center) with Ernie Osiris (left) and Prince Nana (right) as part of The Embassy in 2011

In January 2011, Ciampa began working regularly for ROH. On the January 22 Ring of Honor Wrestling tapings, he defeated Mike Sydal. He joined Prince Nana in his heel stable The Embassy. He later defeated Adam Cole and Grizzly Redwood. On April 1 he debuted on internet pay-per-view at Honor Takes Center Stage Night One, taking part in a Four Corners match that was won by Homicide. Ciampa went on to defeat Homicide twice, once on the second show of Honor Takes Center Stage and again on May 6, at ROH Revolution: USA. The next day, at ROH Revolution: Canada, Ciampa was part of the first "Double Danger Scramble" match, which was won by Michael Elgin. On July 13, Ring of Honor announced that Ciampa had signed a contract with the promotion. On September 17 at Death Before Dishonor IX, Ciampa pinned Homicide in a tag team match, where he teamed with Rhino and Homicide with Jay Lethal.

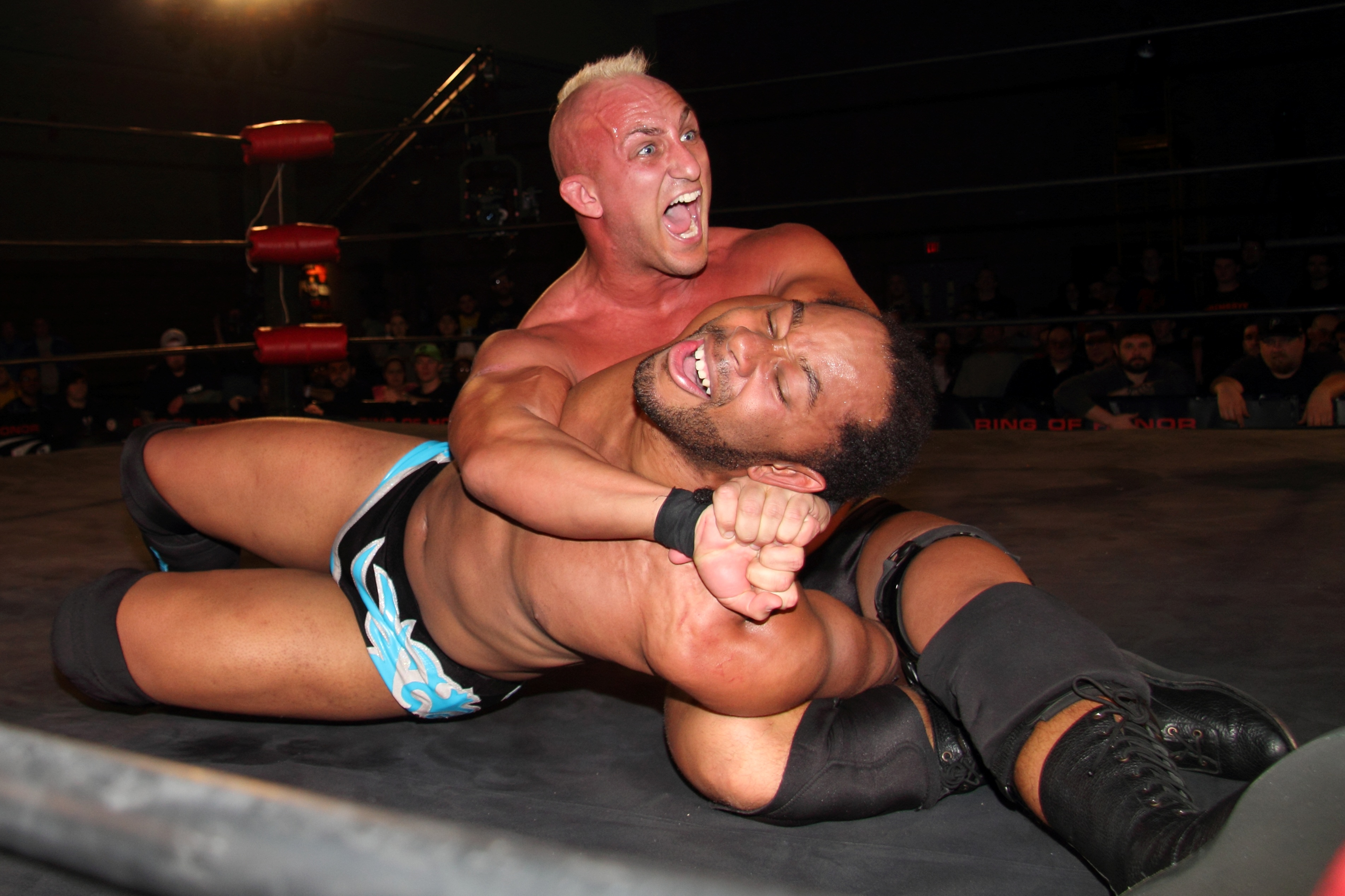
Tommaso Ciampa with Jay Lethal in a submission hold at a ROH show

At an ROH house show on January 21, 2012, Ciampa defeated ROH World Television Champion Jay Lethal in a Proving Ground Match to earn a future match for the ROH World Television Championship. On March 4 at the 10th Anniversary Show, Ciampa's match with Lethal for the ROH World Television Championship ended in a fifteen-minute time limit draw. Ciampa continued his feud with Lethal on March 31 at Showdown in the Sun, where he interfered in his match with Roderick Strong and cost him the title. On the April 7 episode of Ring of Honor Wrestling, Ciampa defeated Lethal, Adam Cole and Mike Bennett in a four-way final to win the 2012 March Mayhem tournament. On May 12 at Border Wars, Ciampa's undefeated streak was ended, when he was defeated by Lethal in a singles match. On June 24 at Best in the World 2012: Hostage Crisis, Ciampa received another shot at the ROH World Television Championship, but was defeated by Roderick Strong in a three-way elimination match, also involving Lethal, following interference from Prince Nana. Afterward, Ciampa turned on Nana, after it was revealed that he had struck a deal with Truth Martini to keep the Television Championship on Strong, broke away from The Embassy and adopted R.D. Evans as his new manager. The feud between Ciampa and Lethal culminated on August 11 at Boiling Point, where Lethal defeated Ciampa in a Two Out of Three Falls match. During the match Ciampa tore his anterior cruciate ligament, sidelining him indefinitely from in-ring action. On September 7, Ciampa announced that his injury required surgery, which would sideline him for a year. Ciampa made an appearance on December 16 at Final Battle 2012: Doomsday, trying to get his hands on R.D. Evans, after he had defeated Prince Nana in a match. Ciampa returned from his injury on May 4 at Border Wars 2013, chasing Evans and his new associate, Q.T. Marshall, out of the ring.

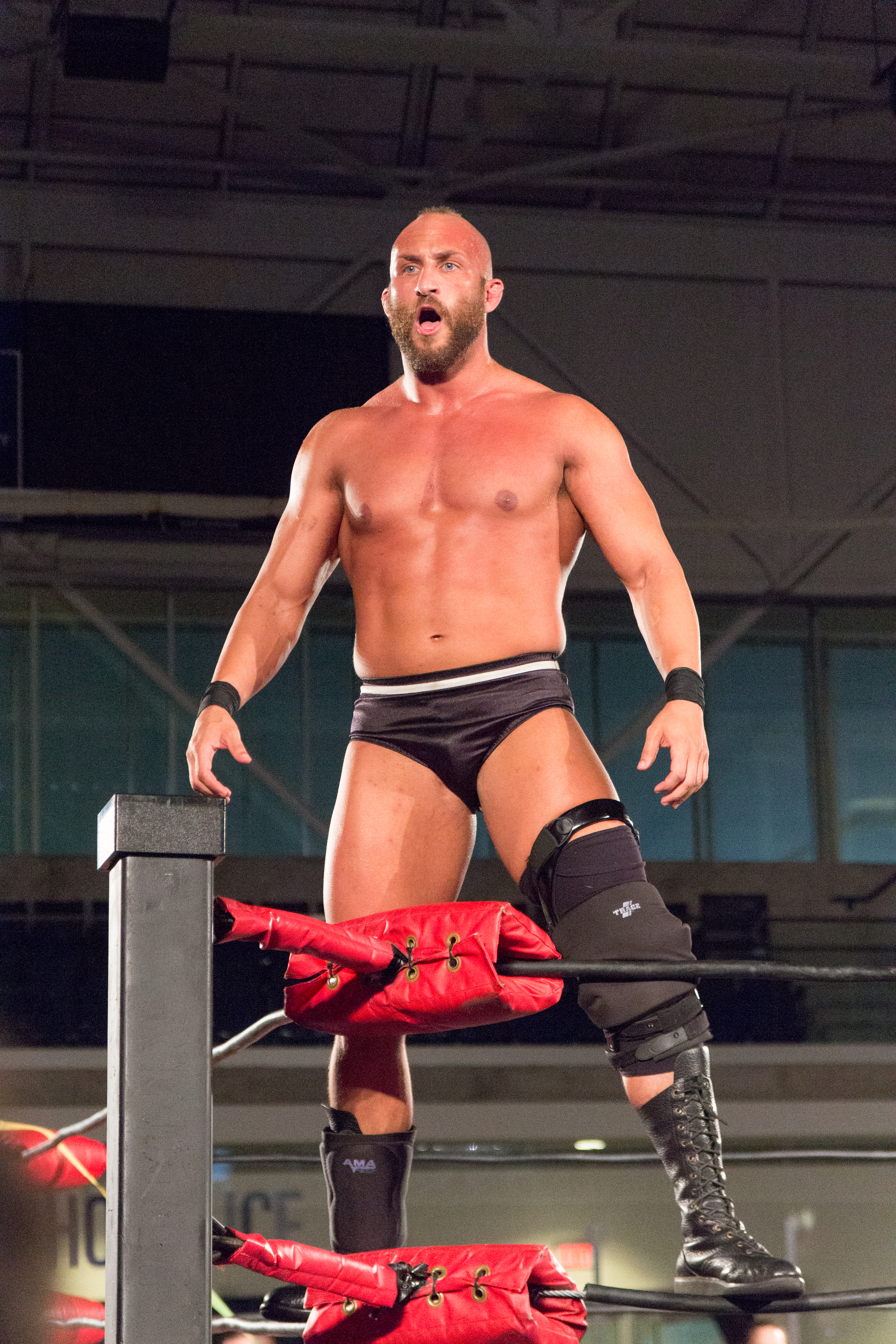
Ciampa in 2013 at a Ring of Honor show

On August 3, Ciampa entered a tournament to determine the new ROH World Champion, defeating Silas Young in his first round match. On August 17, Ciampa defeated Michael Bennett to advance to the semi-finals of the tournament. On September 20 at Death Before Dishonor XI, Ciampa was eliminated from the tournament by Adam Cole. At Final Battle 2013 on December 14, Ciampa began his first reign as ROH World Television Champion, when he defeated Matt Taven for the title. The following month Ciampa successfully defended the title against Taven and Jay Lethal in a three-way match. At the 12th Anniversary Show in February 2014, he retained the championship against Hanson. On April 4, at Supercard of Honor VIII, Ciampa lost the title to Jay Lethal following outside interference from Truth Martini.

After an extended period of absence, Ciampa returned on July 19 with a new look, having increased his muscle mass and sporting an untrimmed full beard. He promptly defeated Adam Page of The Decade, then followed it with a promo hinting at a heel turn stating that he felt under-appreciated and wanted a shot at the ROH World Championship before being interrupted by Silas Young. He followed this up on August 9 by losing to Rocky Romero by disqualification due to not releasing the Sicilian Stretch at the referee's count of five. After unsuccessfully challenging Michael Elgin for the ROH World Championship on August 23, Ciampa was (kayfabe) suspended indefinitely by ROH for attacking the ring crew and ring announcer Bobby Cruise, thus cementing his heel status.

At the ROH 13th Anniversary Show, Ciampa suffered two fractured ribs during his match, forcing him out of action. He later said he'd finished the match "on autopilot" as the pain was more intense than when he had torn his ACL. He missed several Ring of Honor shows before returning to action (albeit with taped ribs) at an independent show in Toronto. On March 29, 2015, Ciampa announced his departure from ROH. His final match was a failed effort to win the TV title from Jay Lethal who retained after delivering a low blow to Ciampa. Ciampa then attacked referee Todd Sinclair with a low blow as payback for not calling a DQ for the illegal move.

=== Total Nonstop Action Wrestling (2015) ===
Ciampa made an appearance for Total Nonstop Action Wrestling (TNA) on the September 30, 2015, episode of Impact Wrestling in a triple threat match also involving DJZ and Trevor Lee, which was won by Lee. Ciampa wrestled for TNA once again on the October 17, 2015, edition of Xplosion, defeating Crazzy Steve.

=== Return to WWE (2015–2026) ===
==== #DIY (2015–2017) ====
Although not re-signed to WWE, on September 2, 2015, Ciampa was announced as part of the NXT Dusty Rhodes Tag Team Classic tournament. On September 9, he successfully advanced in the first round of the tournament alongside his new partner Johnny Gargano, defeating the also newly formed duo of Tyler Breeze and Bull Dempsey. On the September 16 episode of NXT, Ciampa and Gargano lost to Baron Corbin and Rhyno thus eliminating them from the tournament. On the September 30 episode, Ciampa lost to Breeze in a singles match. He appeared on the December 2 episode of NXT, losing to Samoa Joe. Ciampa won a match against Danny Burch on the January 13, 2016, episode of NXT and defeated Bull Dempsey on the February 24, episode. On March 15 tapings, Ciampa scored another win, this time against Jesse Sorensen.

On April 2, it was confirmed that Ciampa had re-signed with WWE earlier in the week. Ciampa's NXT contract was a so-called "Tier 2" contract, which allowed him to continue working independent dates alongside his now regular NXT bookings. On June 23, Ciampa entered the Cruiserweight Classic tournament, losing to Johnny Gargano in his first round match. The following month, Ciampa announced that his final independent booking was set for September as he was entering a new exclusive NXT contract. On August 20 at NXT TakeOver: Brooklyn II, Ciampa and Gargano unsuccessfully challenged The Revival (Dash Wilder and Scott Dawson) for the NXT Tag Team Championship. Ciampa and Gargano, now collectively billed as "#DIY", received another title shot in a two out of three falls match on November 19 at NXT TakeOver: Toronto, where they defeated The Revival to become the new NXT Tag Team Champions.

DIY went on to successfully defend their championships against the team of Tajiri and Akira Tozawa and TM61 in Japan and Australia, respectively. They retained their titles against The Revival on the January 11, 2017, episode of NXT, but were attacked by The Authors of Pain (Akam and Rezar) afterwards. Ciampa and Gargano lost the championships to The Authors of Pain at NXT TakeOver: San Antonio. They would get their rematch on the March 1 episode of NXT, which ended in a no contest after The Revival interfered and attacked both teams. This led to NXT TakeOver: Orlando, a triple threat elimination match between all three teams for the titles, but DIY were unsuccessful after being the first team eliminated.

At NXT TakeOver: Chicago, DIY faced The Authors of Pain in the first-ever ladder match for the NXT Tag Team Championship, which they lost. After the match, Ciampa attacked Gargano, turning heel and disbanding #DIY. It was later revealed that Ciampa had suffered a ruptured ACL in his right knee during the ladder match and would await surgery in Birmingham, Alabama. In a further update, it was reported that his surgery was successful and the timetable for his return was estimated for early-to-mid 2018.

==== NXT Champion and injury (2018–2022) ====
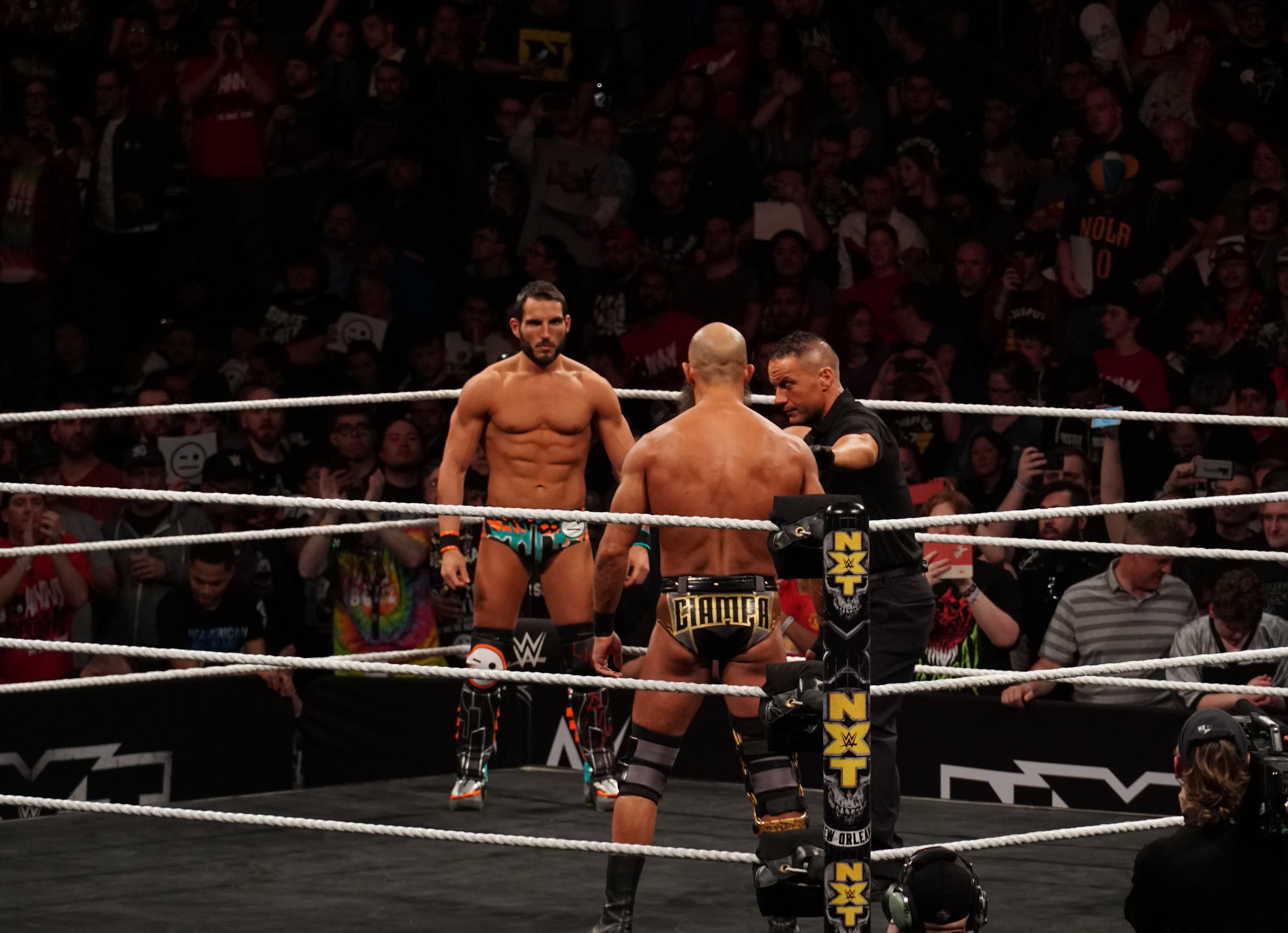
Ciampa (front) facing Johnny Gargano at NXT TakeOver: New Orleans in April 2018

On January 27, 2018, Ciampa returned at NXT TakeOver: Philadelphia, attacking Gargano with a crutch to close the show. He then cost Gargano his NXT Championship match against Andrade "Cien" Almas on the February 21 episode of NXT, forcing Gargano to leave NXT as per the pre-match stipulation. Ciampa made his in-ring return in the main event of NXT TakeOver: New Orleans, losing to Gargano in an unsanctioned match, resulting in Gargano being reinstated to NXT. Their feud would continue throughout the following weeks in which they attacked each other and interfered in each other's matches, leading to a Chicago Street Fight at NXT TakeOver: Chicago II, which Ciampa won.

On the July 18 tapings of the July 25 episode of NXT, Ciampa defeated Aleister Black to capture the NXT Championship after Gargano interfered and accidentally hit Black with the title belt. This made Ciampa only the second wrestler to hold both the NXT Championship and NXT Tag Team Championship, after Neville. At NXT TakeOver: Brooklyn IV, he was scheduled to defend the title against Black and Gargano in a triple threat match, but Black was removed from the match due to being ambushed in the arena parking lot by an unknown assailant (in reality, Black had suffered a legitimate groin injury). The match was changed to the first-ever Last Man Standing match for the NXT Championship between Ciampa and Gargano, where Ciampa retained his title. At NXT TakeOver: WarGames, Ciampa retained the championship against Velveteen Dream. Ciampa defended the title against Black at NXT TakeOver: Phoenix in a winning effort.

Ciampa debuted on Raw on February 18, 2019, with three other fellow NXT stars Johnny Gargano, Aleister Black and Ricochet. In his debut match on Raw, he and Gargano defeated former rivals Raw Tag Team Champions The Revival. The next night on SmackDown Live, Ciampa and Gargano defeated The Bar (Cesaro and Sheamus). On March 6, it was reported by Dave Meltzer of The Wrestling Observer that Ciampa would have to undergo neck surgery, as well as forcing him to vacate the NXT Championship and the injury would put him out of action for at least six months. At that point, he had not wrestled since February 19. WWE later confirmed the story saying he would undergo an anterior cervical fusion. Meltzer later reported that due to the injury, WWE had to cancel the main roster feud that was planned between Ciampa and Gargano. The two were also scheduled to face each other at NXT TakeOver: New York.

Ciampa relinquished his NXT Championship due to injury on the March 20, 2019, edition of NXT, ending his reign at 237 days. On April 1, he revealed that doctors had told him that he will be wrestling on "borrowed time" if he is even able to return to the ring at all. He made a surprise appearance at NXT TakeOver: New York on April 5 after Gargano defeated Adam Cole to win the NXT Championship, embracing Gargano to celebrate his victory and turning face in the process.

On the October 2 episode of NXT, Ciampa returned from injury, confronting Adam Cole, who had become the longest-reigning NXT Champion. After Ciampa saved Matt Riddle and Keith Lee from a beatdown at the hands of The Undisputed Era (Cole, Bobby Fish, Kyle O'Reilly, and Roderick Strong) on the October 30 episode of NXT, a WarGames match was scheduled between Ciampa's team against The Undisputed Era. At NXT TakeOver: WarGames on November 23, Team Ciampa (Ciampa, Lee, Dominik Dijakovic, and Kevin Owens) defeated The Undisputed Era. This led to a match between Ciampa and Cole at NXT TakeOver: Portland on February 16, 2020, for the NXT Championship, which Cole won after Gargano cost Ciampa the match, thus re-igniting their feud. On the April 8 episode of NXT, this culminated in a No Holds Barred match between Ciampa and Gargano, which Gargano won after interference from Candice LeRae.

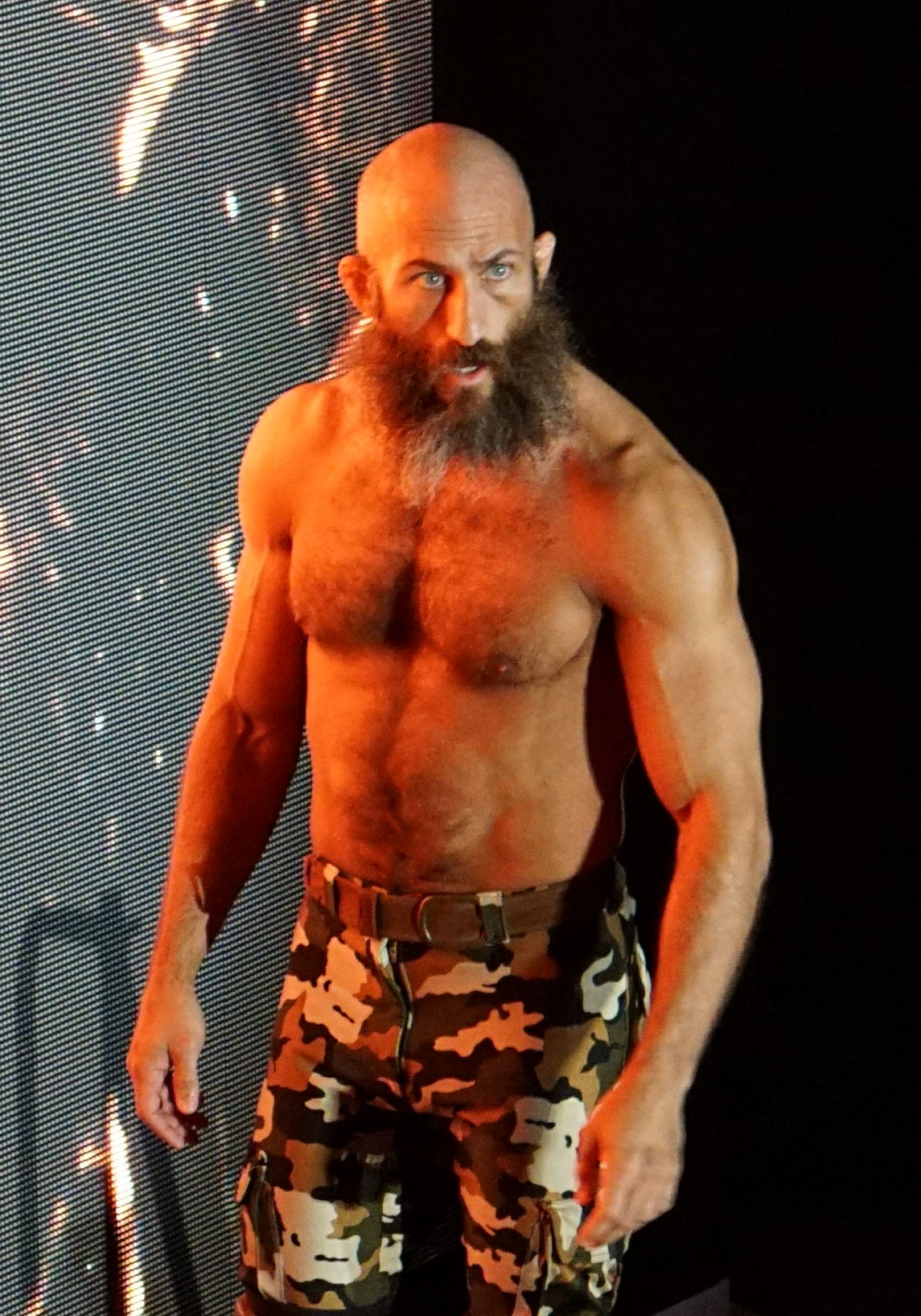
Ciampa in 2020

Ciampa then entered a feud with Karrion Kross, who attacked him backstage during an interview. At TakeOver: In Your House, Ciampa was quickly defeated by Kross. After a brief hiatus, Ciampa returned as a heel on the August 26 episode of NXT, where he defeated Jake Atlas and continued his post-match assault on Atlas. He would then compete in a losing effort in the fatal four-way 60 minute Iron Man match for the vacant NXT Championship, tying with Gargano at one fall a piece. Ciampa turned face again when he began a feud with Timothy Thatcher, leading to a match at NXT TakeOver: WarGames where Ciampa won. On the January 20, 2021, episode of NXT, Ciampa fought and lost to Thatcher in the Fight Pit. After the match, Thatcher and Ciampa showed respect to one another and Ciampa asked Thatcher to be his partner for the Dusty Rhodes Tag Team Classic which Thatcher accepted. They defeated Ariya Daivari and Tony Nese in the first round and The Undisputed Era (Adam Cole and Roderick Strong) in the quarter finals, before losing to the Grizzled Young Veterans in the semi-finals. At NXT TakeOver: Stand & Deliver, Ciampa was defeated by Walter for the NXT UK Championship. On the June 15 episode of NXT, Ciampa and Thatcher defeated the Grizzled Young Veterans in a tornado tag match to earn a future NXT Tag Team Championship match. They faced the champions, MSK on July 6 at The Great American Bash but were defeated. Thatcher was written off TV on August 24 due to a kayfabe throat injury from Ridge Holland, ending the team; this was his final appearance as he was eventually released from the company in January.

On the September 14 episode of NXT, Ciampa defeated L. A. Knight, Pete Dunne, and Von Wagner in a fatal 4-way match to win the vacant NXT Championship. At Halloween Havoc, Ciampa retained against Bron Breakker. At WarGames, Ciampa teamed with Johnny Gargano, L. A. Knight and Pete Dunne (as "Team Black & Gold") against Breakker, Carmelo Hayes, Grayson Waller, and Tony D'Angelo (as "Team 2.0"), but lost when Breakker pinned Ciampa. At New Year's Evil on January 4, 2022, Ciampa lost the title to Breakker in a rematch, ending his second reign at 112 days. They both appeared on the March 7 episode of Raw, where they defeated Dolph Ziggler and Robert Roode. On April 2 at NXT Stand & Deliver, Ciampa lost to Tony D'Angelo in his final match in NXT.

==== Main roster (2022–2023) ====
On the April 11 episode of Raw, Ciampa was officially called up to the brand while also participating in a backstage segment with Ezekiel and Kevin Owens. On the April 25 episode of Raw, now under the shortened ring name "Ciampa", he attacked Mustafa Ali after his match against The Miz, turning heel. On the July 4 episode of Raw, Ciampa aligned himself with Miz after helping him attack AJ Styles after their match. On the August 1 episode of Raw, he defeated Chad Gable and Dolph Ziggler in a triple threat match while also defeating Styles later that night to earn an opportunity to face Bobby Lashley for the United States Championship. Ciampa faced Lashley for the title the following week in a match dedicated to Harley Race, but lost. On the September 5 episode of Raw, his ring name was reverted to Tommaso Ciampa. Ciampa then suffered a hip injury in October.

==== #DIY reunion (2023–2026) ====
On the June 19, 2023 episode of Raw, Ciampa returned (with his iconic NXT theme, No One Will Survive) to answer The Miz's open challenge, which Ciampa won, thus ending their alliance and turning face once again. Ciampa soon after began a feud with Intercontinental Champion Gunther, losing a match for the title on the October 2 episode of Raw. Post-match, he would suffer a beatdown from Imperium until Johnny Gargano returned after a five-month hiatus and saved him, reforming DIY in the process. On the January 8 episode of RAW, Ciampa beat Finn Balor. Winning that match earned DIY a tag team title shot. They got the match on the January 29th episode of RAW but they were defeated by The Judgment Day. On the March 18 episode of RAW, DIY defeated the Creed Brothers to qualify for the Six Pack Ladder Match for the Tag Team Championship at WrestleMania XL, which they were unsuccessful. On the April 15 episode of Raw, DIY defeated The New Day and the Creed Brothers to face Awesome Truth (The Miz and R-Truth) for the renamed World Tag Team Championship, where Awesome Truth retained.

On night 2 of the 2024 WWE Draft, both Ciampa and Gargano were drafted to SmackDown. On the May 31 episode of SmackDown, Ciampa defeated one half of the WWE Tag Team Champions Austin Theory. On the July 5, 2024 episode of WWE SmackDown Ciampa and Gargano as #DIY defeated A-Town Down Under (Austin Theory and Grayson Waller) to become the new WWE Tag Team Champions. On the August 2 episode of SmackDown, DIY lost the titles to The Bloodline (Fatu and Tama Tonga) after interference from Solo Sikoa and Tonga Loa, ending their reign at 28 days.

Over the next few months, DIY vowed to win back the titles, but there were signs of dissension between Ciampa and Gargano as the former took on a more aggressive character. On the November 15 episode of SmackDown, Ciampa interrupted a title match between The Street Profits (Angelo Dawkins and Montez Ford) and defending champions Motor City Machine Guns (Alex Shelley and Chris Sabin), attacking both teams, but Gargano restrained him. On the December 6 episode of SmackDown, DIY defeated Motor City Machine Guns to win the titles for the second time after Gargano hit Sabin with a low blow, and subsequently revealing all the recent arguments to be a ruse, turning both Gargano and Ciampa heel.

At the Royal Rumble on February 1, DIY successfully defended the titles against Motor City Machine Guns in a 2 out of 3 falls match with interference from The Street Profits who attacked them after the match. On the March 14 episode of SmackDown, #DIY lost the titles to the Street Profits, ending their second reign at 98 days. On the April 25 episode of SmackDown, they lost to the Street Profits in a critically acclaimed tables, ladders, and chairs match also involving the Motor City Machine Guns, where the Street Profits retained. On the December 19 episode of SmackDown, DIY were defeated by Carmelo Hayes and Ilja Dragunov in what would be Ciampa's final match in WWE.

On January 21, 2026, Ciampa announced he would not be renewing his contract when it expires, thus ending his 10-year tenure with WWE.

=== All Elite Wrestling (2026–present) ===
On the January 28, 2026 episode of Dynamite, Ciampa made his All Elite Wrestling (AEW) debut as a face, answering Mark Briscoe's open challenge for the AEW TNT Championship and would go on to defeat Briscoe for the title on Collision three days later. As TNT Champion, Ciampa made one successful defense the following week on Collision against Claudio Castagnoli and Roderick Strong in three-way match before losing it to Kyle Fletcher three days later on Dynamite, ending his reign at 11 days. In the following months, Ciampa would turn heel and would go on the challenge for several titles including the AEW World Championship against Darby Allin. Starting in May 2026, Ciampa began a feud with Jericho and would go on to defeat him at Dynamite: Beach Break on July 8 but would lose to him in a No Holds Barred match at Redemption on July 26 to end the feud. On August 30 at All In, Ciampa competed in the Casino Gauntlet match for an AEW World Championship opportunity. On September 26 at All Out, Ciampa unsuccessfully challenged Kazuchika Okada for the AEW International Championship. On October 17 at WrestleDream, Ciampa unsuccessfully challenged Andrade El Idolo for the AEW National Championship but would defeat him for the title in a rematch at the Rock & Wrestling Rager special episode of Collision on November 7. His reign would only last a week as he would lose the title to Ilja Dragunov on November 14 at Full Gear.

== Other media ==
As Tommaso Ciampa, he made his video game debut as a playable character in WWE 2K18 and has since appeared in WWE 2K20, WWE 2K22, WWE 2K23, WWE 2K24, WWE 2K25 and WWE 2K26.

== Personal life ==
Whitney married former professional wrestler Jessie Ward in September 2013, having been introduced to her by their mutual friend Samoa Joe. They have one daughter together. Whitney held a part-time job managing a fitness studio until March 2014, when he left to focus on a full-time career in professional wrestling.

== Championships and accomplishments ==
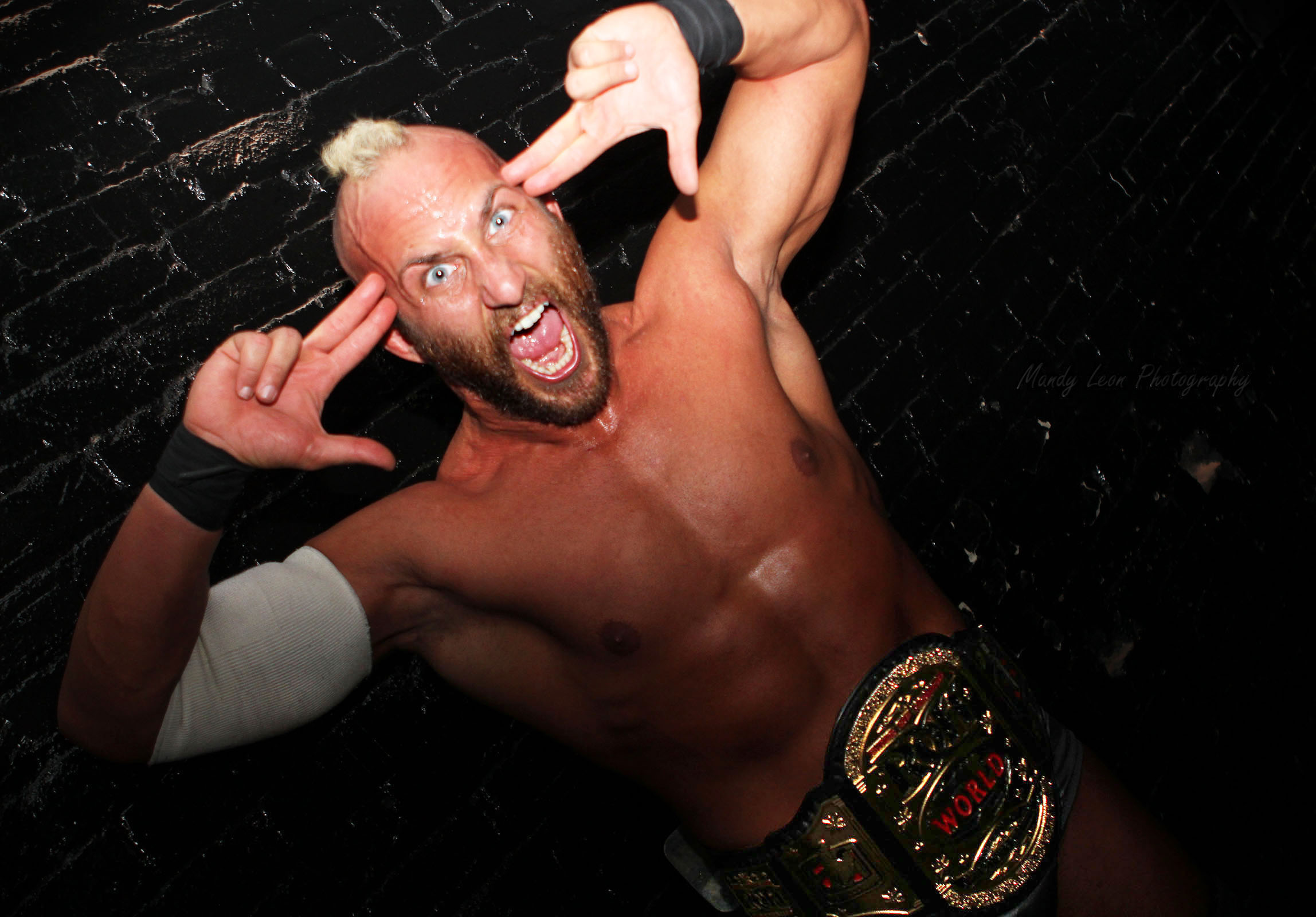
Ciampa is a former ROH World Television Champion.

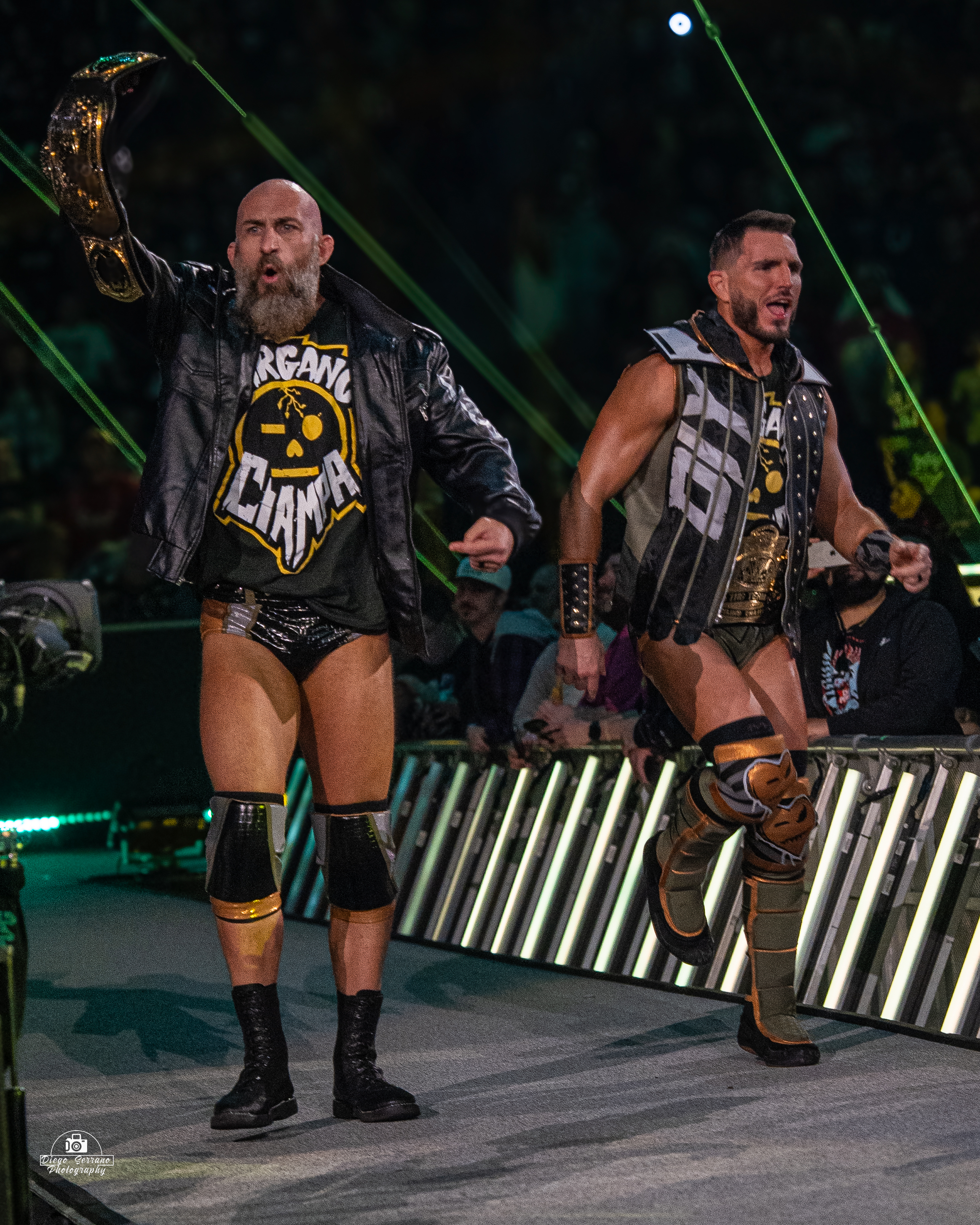
Ciampa (left) and Johnny Gargano as the WWE Tag Team Champions

- All Elite Wrestling
  - AEW National Championship (1 time)
  - AEW TNT Championship (1 time)
- CBS Sports
  - Feud of the Year (2018) vs. Johnny Gargano
- Chaotic Wrestling
  - Chaotic Wrestling Heavyweight Championship (1 time)
  - Chaotic Wrestling New England Championship (1 time)
- East Coast Wrestling Association
  - Super 8 Tournament (2011)
- Millennium Wrestling Federation
  - MWF Television Championship (1 time)
- Pro Wrestling Illustrated
  - Feud of the Year (2018) vs. Johnny Gargano
  - Ranked No. 13 of the top 500 singles wrestlers in the PWI 500 in 2019
- Ring of Honor
  - ROH World Television Championship (1 time)
  - March Mayhem Tournament (2012)
- Sports Illustrated
  - Ranked No. 9 of the top 10 men's wrestlers in 2018 – tied with Johnny Gargano
- UPW Pro Wrestling
  - UPW Heavyweight Championship (1 time)
- Wrestling Observer Newsletter
  - Feud of the Year (2018) vs. Johnny Gargano
- WWE
  - NXT Championship (2 times)
  - WWE Tag Team Championship (2 times) – with Johnny Gargano
  - NXT Tag Team Championship (1 time) – with Johnny Gargano
  - NXT Year-End Award (3 times)
    - Match of the Year (2016) with Johnny Gargano vs. The Revival (Dash Wilder and Scott Dawson) in a two-out-of-three falls match for the NXT Tag Team Championship at NXT TakeOver: Toronto
    - Male Competitor of the Year (2018)
    - Rivalry of the Year (2018) vs. Johnny Gargano
- Xtreme Wrestling Alliance
  - XWA Heavyweight Championship (1 time)
