= Jessie Ward =

American television producer and former wrestler

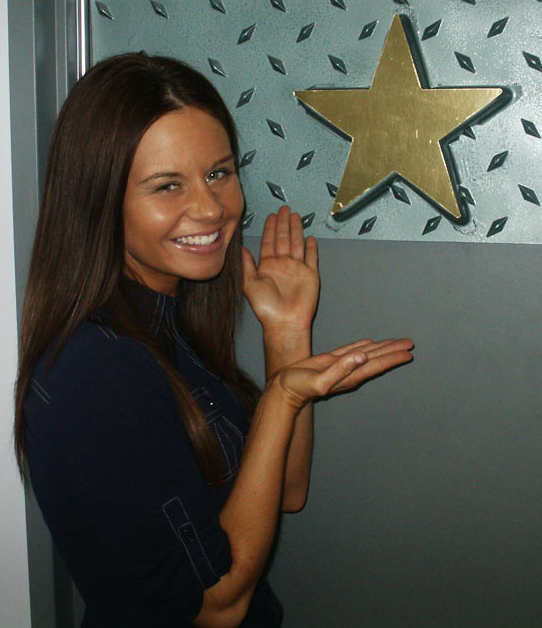
- Ward in 2006

Personal information
- Born: Jessie Lynn Ward; December 16, 1979 (age 46) West Allis, Wisconsin, U.S.
- Education: Emerson College
- Spouse: Tommaso Whitney (m. 2013)
- Children: 1

Professional wrestling career
- Ring name: Jessie
- Billed height: 5 ft 6 in (168 cm)
- Billed weight: 105 lb (48 kg)
- Trained by: Al Snow; Ivory; Tazz; Hardcore Holly; Chavo Guerrero Jr.
- Debut: 2002

Jessie Lynn Whitney (née Ward; born December 16, 1979) is an American television producer and retired professional wrestler.

== Professional wrestling career ==
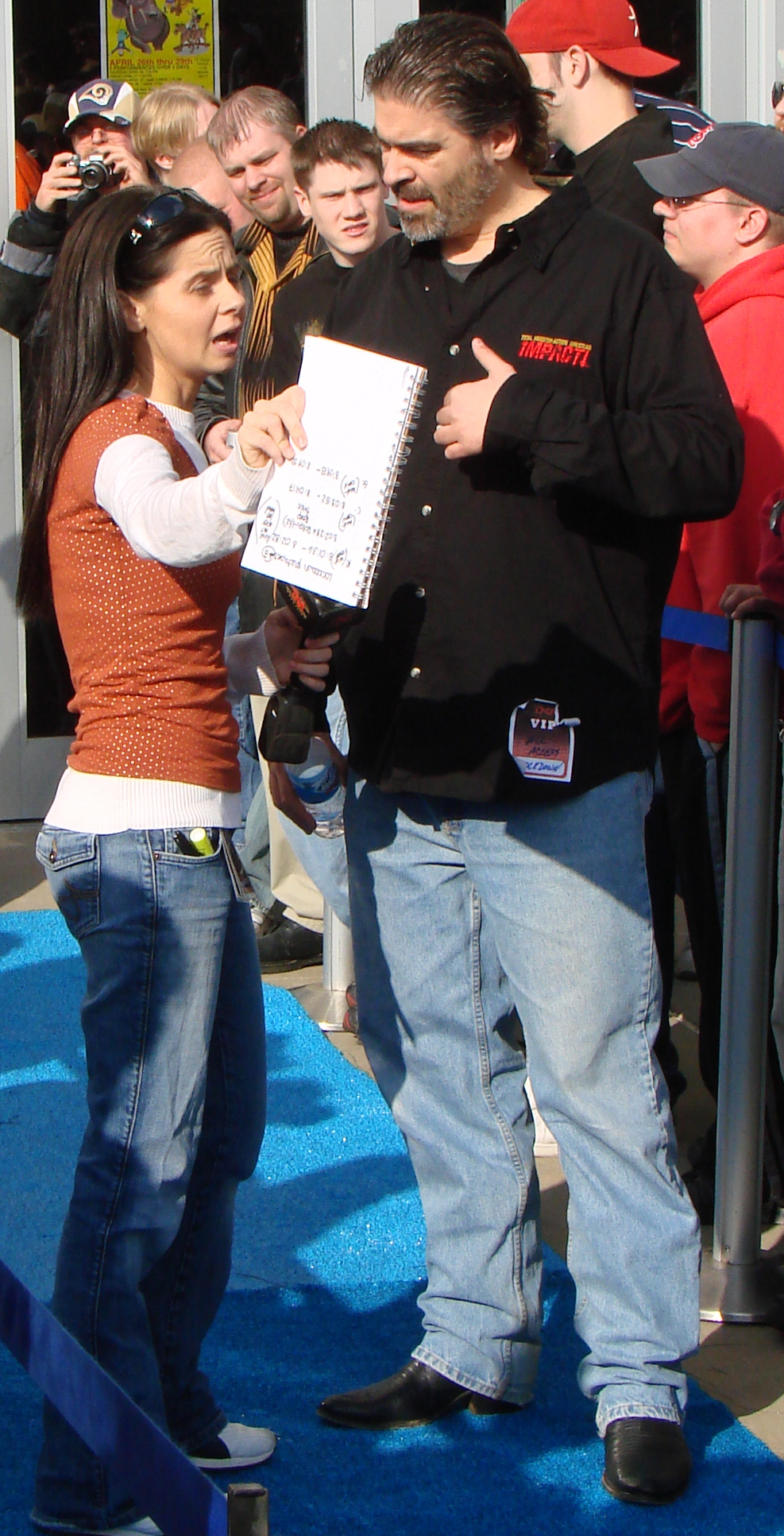
Ward with Vince Russo outside of the Family Arena in St. Charles, Missouri, on April 15, 2007

Ward was one of the contestants on the World Wrestling Federation reality television program Tough Enough II, wherein thirteen would-be wrestlers trained under WWF employees Al Snow, Ivory, Tazz, Hardcore Holly, Chavo Guerrero Jr. and John Gaburick for fourteen weeks. The trainers would select two winners by a process of elimination, and the winner would receive a WWF developmental contract. Ward joined the series at the outset in February 2002.

On the March 28, 2002 episode of Tough Enough, Ward's hands and legs went numb after she took a bump. She visited a doctor as a result, and was diagnosed with vasovagal syncope and given a heart rate monitor to wear throughout the following day. On the April 11 episode, she opted to leave the program as she was suffering from continuous pain and lethargy.

Over six months after dropping out of Tough Enough, Ward was hired by the WWE in October 2002 as a stage manager. She worked on Tough Enough III and travelled full-time with the RAW and SmackDown! rosters until February 2004 when she decided to go back to college to finish her degree.

== Television production career ==
Ward enrolled at Emerson College majoring in their visual media arts program with a concentration in television/video. While in school, Ward briefly worked for Total Nonstop Action Wrestling as an assistant director in September 2004 and returned to TNA on a full-time basis in July 2005 when she began working under head director David Sahadi. She stayed with TNA until May 2007, graduating cum laude that same year.

Ward produced an independent film, Thumbnail, in late 2007. She joined Powderhouse Productions in June 2008 producing shows such as The Works on The History Channel, Mega Engineering and Best in the Business on The Discovery Channel, Extreme Bathrooms and Extreme Houseboats on Travel Channel, Masters of Innovation on Plum TV, as well as the Animal Planet programs Dogs 101, Cats 101, America's Cutest Dog, America's Cutest Cat, Dogs vs Cats and Must Love Cats.

In November 2011, Ward left Powderhouse Productions and became a full-time freelance television producer. Since then, her credits have included Cajun Pawn Stars, North Woods Law, Big Brother and many other television programs.

== Personal life ==
Ward married professional wrestler Tommaso Whitney (best known as Tommaso Ciampa) in September 2013. They have a daughter named Willow.
