= New England Informer =

Monthly newsmagazine serving the African American community in New England

- November 2016 cover
- Type: News magazine
- Publisher: Doreen Wade
- Founded: 2000
- Headquarters: Cambridge, Massachusetts, U.S.
- ISSN: 1531-345X
- OCLC number: 44802370
- Website: New England Informer

The N. E. Informer (formerly the New England Informer) is an American monthly news magazine that serves the African American community, based in Massachusetts. It was founded in 2000, but folded shortly thereafter and was relaunched in 2006 by Doreen Wade.

Wade, who was nominated for Massachusetts Small Business Person of the Year in 2013 by the Small Business Administration, acts as publisher and CEO of the paper. She is also the founder of Salem United, a group seeking to preserve and restore the Salem Willows Black Picnic.

The paper seeks to publish information that will "uplift, educate and inform" communities of color. The news magazine's print edition was distributed when the Democratic National Convention was in Boston in 2004 which gave the Informer a much wider readership.
