= Millennium Wrestling Federation =

American independent professional wrestling promotion

- Acronym: MWF
- Founded: 2001
- Style: American Wrestling
- Headquarters: Melrose, Massachusetts
- Founder(s): Dan Mirade & Neil Manolian
- Owner(s): John Cena Sr. (2007-current); Dan Mirade (2001-2022); Neil Manolian (2001-2007)
- Parent: Fabulous Productions, Inc.
- Website: MWFProWrestling.com

The Millennium Wrestling Federation (MWF) was a New England independent professional wrestling promotion based in Melrose, Massachusetts, and founded in January 2001 by promoters Dan Mirade & Neil Manolian.

Among the wrestlers who appeared in the promotion were independent wrestlers Abyss, A.J. Styles, Kofi Kingston, Joey Mercury, Antonio Thomas, Chris Sabin, Alex Shelley, Rick Fuller, Homicide, and R. J. Brewer.

John Cena Sr., the father of John Cena, took control of the promotion in September 2007 after buying out Neil Manolian's partial stock in the company.

== History ==
The Millennium Wrestling Federation was founded by Dan Mirade and Neil Manolian in January 2001, partly founded in memory of longtime Boston promoter Tony Rumble and held their first show on September 28 of that year. Based in Melrose, Massachusetts, the promotion regularly began running shows in the greater Boston area for over a year before the debut of its weekly half-hour television program MWF Xtra on Labor Day weekend. The show was hosted by Dan Mirade and MWF on-air personalities The Jackal & Dr. Brad Von Johnson as well as special guest Tiger Mulligan, who would later win the promotion's Heavyweight Championship defeating "2Xtreme" John Brooks in the tournament finals of the "Soul Survivor" competition at the Soul Survivor I supercard to crown the first MWF Heavyweight Champion and was presented the championship belt by Bobby "The Brain" Heenan.

On October 5, 2002, Gary Michael Cappetta & Superstar Billy Graham appeared at a MWF benefit show at the America Civic Center in Wakefield, Massachusetts. The card also featured Road Dogg and the MWF debuts of "Die Hard" Eddie Edwards & Todd Hanson.

A second show, MWF ULTRA, was also introduced with its first episode on October 12, 2003, but eventually became a monthly, one-hour special in October 2004. Its guests included Johnny Fabulous, Karl Lauer, Scotty 2 Hotty, Demolition Smash, The Iron Sheik, Percy Pringle and actress Brigitte Nielsen. In addition to its wide use of regional cable TV throughout the New England area, the promotion also began broadcasting its shows via internet broadcast and in-demand in May 2005 and became available in over 60 countries. That same year, the two more championships were created with "Die Hard" Eddie Edwards winning a tournament for the MWF Television Championship and, at MWF Iron Sheik Appreciation Night, Todd Hanson and Beau Douglas won a Tag Team Royal Rumble eliminating The Islanders for the titles. The MWF Heavyweight Championship, which had become vacant, was won by Dylan Kage when he defeated Slyck Wagner Brown on the first episode of MWF ULTRA.

On November 11, 2005, the Soul Survivor III supercard featured MWF Heavyweight Champion Dylan Kage joining forces with Paul Bearer defeating Luis Ortiz, and MWF Television Champion Eddie Edwards defending his title against Fergal Devitt & John Walters in the main event in Lynn, Massachusetts. The show also featured Test, The Sandman, The Missing Link and Ox Baker . NWA Ireland wrestler Fergal Devitt appeared at several MWF events while in New England during his 2005-2006 US tour. Facing Eddie Edwards and John Walters in a triple treat for the MWF TV Title, the match ended after 15 minutes when Edwards pinned Walters for the title.

Involved in fundraising and other community projects, the Millennium Wrestling Federation's on-going Keep The Kids Off The Streets Campaign presented live wrestling events in inner city neighborhoods. Its efforts in fundraising activities has raised tens of thousands of dollars for a number of charities and non-profit organizations including the American Red Cross, the Special Olympics and received extensive press coverage from The Boston Globe, The Howard Stern Show, KISS 108 FM, the Eddie Andelman Show, CN8 Sports Pulse and ESPN Radio. The promotion was involved in promoting other non-wrestling events in Boston such as hosting the Boston premiere of The Condemned (including a Q&A with "Stone Cold" Steve Austin) and The Iron Sheik's appearance on Toronto's Hi-Fi Network and promoting the Wrestling's Living Legends reunion on the morning of WrestleMania 23 in Windsor, Ontario. The event also featured Demolition (Ax and Smash) in their first appearance in sixteen years.

In September 2007, MWF Chairman Neil Manolian sold his share of the promotion to John Cena Sr., giving him majority control of the company, and as a result, Cena was named MWF President three months later, replacing on-air personality The Jackal. During the first half of 2008, a number of wrestlers from Total Nonstop Action Wrestling appeared for the promotion. On March 29, the promotion held its first show in Nashua, New Hampshire at Live Free or Die.

On June 21, the MWF held the final professional wrestling event at the Good Time Emporium in Somerville, Massachusetts prior to its close at the end of the month. The "Night of Champions" supercard included MWF Heavyweight Champion Todd Hanson successfully defending his title against Abyss, Rick Fuller and Executioner Milonas in a Monster's Ball match. The undercard featured a lumberjack match between MWF Television Champion Tommaso Ciampa and Jay Lethal, MWF Tag Team Champions The Canadian Superstars against Beau Douglas and a mystery partner. The event also had the debut of Homicide and the return of Chris Sabin.

Dan Mirade died on March 7, 2022. He was 41 years old.

== Controversy ==
=== Iron Sheik ===
A regular on the independent circuit since the early 1990s, the Iron Sheik became associated with the MWF soon after its establishment and was later named the MWF Lt. Commissioner. On August 5, 2005, the Iron Sheik, Dan Mirade and MWF Commissioner Dr. Brad Von Johnson were involved in a serious car accident when they were hit head on by a drunk driver following an event, Iron Sheik Appreciation Night, in Blackstone, Massachusetts. The Iron Sheik caused a disturbance at the event earlier refusing to sign autographs or to actively participate in the show going on a drug induced episode in the parking lot locking himself in a wrestler's car. The three were later treated at a local hospital and the Iron Sheik later claimed he might never wrestle again.

In November 2004, during an MWF Studio shoot interview with Dan Mirade, the Iron Sheik went on a tirade when asked about his appearance at WrestleMania III with Nikolai Volkoff and their match against The Killer Bees (B. Brian Blair and Jim Brunzell) making several controversial and derogatory statements in reference to Brian Blair. This interview was later released on a three-hour DVD and has since become popular on websites such as YouTube and led to his appearances on Howard Stern. The video has been seen by over one and a half million fans. However, in 2005, the Iron Sheik was inducted into the WWE Hall of Fame.

In 2008, the MWF conducted another shoot interview with the Iron Sheik. Similarly released on DVD, the Sheik verbally attacked Hulk Hogan and The Ultimate Warrior, making remarks about what he'd do to the Warrior's daughter if she was 18. He later made a Christmas challenge to Kramer, footage from the infamous Iron Sheik Appreciation Night and a "drug induced" telephone interview. The Sheik was attacked by the MWF Stalker, claiming he had gotten alcohol poisoning when an MWF cameraman had given him beer in his hotel room.

== Tony Rumble Memorial Battle Royal ==
The Tony Rumble Memorial Battle Royal was a main event held at the semi-annual memorial show for the late Tony Rumble, a wrestler and longtime wrestling promoter in the New England area throughout the 1990s.

=== Winners ===
Year	Name	Date
2003	Todd Hanson	November 22, 2003
2004	Bull Montana	November 13, 2004
2005	Ox Baker	November 6, 2005
2007	Rick Fuller	August 4, 2007
2008	Chase Del Monte	November 15, 2008

== Championships ==
Championship	Last Holder:	Won From:	Date:	Location:
MWF Undisputed Championship	Carlito	First	March 9, 2013	Melrose, MA
MWF Television Championship	Brian Fury	Jay Lethal	November 15, 2008	Melrose, MA
MWF Southern Heavyweight Championship	Dylan Kage		November 13, 2010	Pembroke, NC
MWF Tag Team Championship	Brian Milonas & Rick Fuller	J-Busta & Antonio Thomas	March 1, 2011	Melrose, MA
Tony Rumble Memorial Battle Royal	Chase Del Monte		November 15, 2008	Melrose, MA

== MWF Undisputed Championship ==
The MWF Undisputed Championship was created when Low Ki was stripped from the MWF Heavyweight Championship. Carlito defeated Eddie Edwards, X-Pac, Luis Ortiz and Slyck Wagner Brown. The title was primarily defended in the greater Boston area as well as in southern New England.

Wrestlers:	Reign(s):	Location:	Date:	Notes:
Carlito	1	Melrose, MA	March 9, 2013	Defeated X-Pac, Slyck Wagner Brown, Luis Ortiz and Eddie Edwards to become the first champion.

== MWF Television Championship ==
The MWF Television Championship was created when Eddie Edwards defeated Jerelle Clark in the finals of a championship tournament to crown the first MWF Television Champion on February 5, 2003. The title was primarily defended in the Greater Boston Area and southern New England.

Won By:	Reigns:	Location:	Date:	Notes:
Eddie Edwards	1	Bellingham, MA	February 5, 2005	Defeated Jerelle Clark in a tournament final to become the first-ever MWF Television Champion.
Tommaso Ciampa	1	Somerville, MA	September 29, 2007	This was a Triple Threat Match, also involving A.J. Styles.
Jay Lethal	1	Somerville, MA	June 21, 2008	This was a Lumberjack Match.
Brian Fury	1	Melrose, MA	November 15, 2008	This was a 30 Minute Fatal Four Way Iron Man Match, also involving John Walters & Slyck Wagner Brown; Fury pinned Lethal in the only fall of the match.

== MWF Tag Team Championship ==
The MWF Tag Team Championship was created when Todd Hanson & Beau Douglas defeated The Islanders in a Texas Tornado match at Iron Sheik Appreciation Night in Blackstone, Massachusetts on August 5, 2003. The four had been the last remaining teams in a Royal Rumble along with nine other tag teams. The tag team titles were primarily defended in the greater Boston area and southern New England.

Wrestlers:	Reigns:	Location:	Date:	Notes:
Todd Hanson & Beau Douglas	1	Blackstone, MA	August 5, 2005	Defeated The Islanders in a Texas Tornado match.
The Canadian Superstars (J-Busta & Dave Cole)	1	Braintree, MA	May 20, 2006	
Beau Douglas & BG James	1	Somerville, MA	August 4, 2007	
The Canadian Superstars	2	Salem, MA	October 27, 2007	
Beau Douglas & Jackson Blue	1	Somerville, MA	June 21, 2008	MWF President John Cena Sr. declared that any two members of The Uprising could defend the MWF Tag Team Championship that night due to The Canadian Superstars constantly no-showing events to avoid losing their championship; J-Busta announced that Dave Cole was fired from The Uprising and selected Jason Rumble as his tag team partner.

== See also ==
- List of independent wrestling promotions in the United States
