= ROH Third Anniversary Celebration =

2005 Ring of Honor event

- Promotion: Ring of Honor
- Date: Night One: February 19, 2005; Night Two: February 25, 2005; Night Three: February 26, 2005
- City: Night One: Elizabeth, New Jersey; Night Two: Dayton, Ohio; Night Three: Chicago Ridge, Illinois
- Venue: Night One: Rex Plex; Night Two: Montgomery County Fairgrounds; Night Three: Frontier Fieldhouse
- Attendance: Night One: 1,100; Night Two: 700; Night Three: 1,000

ROH Anniversary Show chronology
← Previous; 2nd Anniversary	Next → 4th Anniversary

Event chronology
← Previous; It All Begins	Next → Do or Die IV (February 19); Trios Tournament (March 5)

Third Anniversary Celebration was the third Anniversary Show professional wrestling event produced by Ring of Honor (ROH). It was a three-day event which took place on February 19, 25 and 26, 2005 at different venues.

The February 19 show took place at Rex Plex in Elizabeth, New Jersey. The event was headlined by a Scramble match in which The Ring Crew Express (Dunn and Marcos) defeated Azrieal and Dixie, Generation Next (Jack Evans and Roderick Strong), Special K (Deranged and Izzy) and The Carnage Crew (DeVito and Loc). In other prominent matches on the card, Austin Aries defeated Colt Cabana in a steel cage match to retain the ROH World Championship, B. J. Whitmer and Dan Maff defeated The Havana Pitbulls (Ricky Reyes and Rocky Romero) to win the ROH Tag Team Championship, John Wwalters retained the ROH Pure Championship against Jay Lethal and Homicide defeated Bryan Danielson in a Taped Fist match, the second match of the Match 2 of the Best of Five Series between the two.

The February 25 show took place at the Montgomery County Fairgrounds in Dayton, Ohio. The event marked the return of A.J. Styles to ROH for the first time in over a year who last appeared for the promotion at At Our Best on March 13, 2004. He headlined the event against Jimmy Rave in a losing effort. In other prominent matches at the event, Bryan Danielson and Samoa Joe defeated Generation Next (Austin Aries and Jack Evans) in a tag team match and B. J. Whitmer and Dan Maff retained the ROH Tag Team Championship against Delirious and Jimmy Jacobs. The event also featured the ROH debut of James Gibson against Spanky.

The February 26 show emanated from the Frontier Fieldhouse in Chicago Ridge, Illinois. In the main event, Austin Aries retained the ROH World Championship against Samoa Joe. The undercard notably featured the third match in the Best of Five Series between Homicide and Bryan Danielson, a Falls Count Anywhere match which Danielson won. Also at the event, Jimmy Rave defeated CM Punk and the team of Colt Cabana and Nigel McGuinness defeated B. J. Whitmer and Dan Maff in a non-title tag team match.

== Storylines ==
=== Main event matches ===
At the second night of Death Before Dishonor II on July 24, 2004, The Second City Saints (Ace Steel and CM Punk) defeated B. J. Whitmer and Dan Maff in an Unsanctioned Chicago Street Fight. After the match, Generation Next attacked the Saints. At Scramble Cage Melee, Steel defeated Generation Next member Roderick Strong but was attacked by Generation Next after the match which led to Second City Saints member Colt Cabana making the save and setting up an impromptu match against Generation Next's Austin Aries. Aries injured Cabana by brutalizing him and making him pass out by injuring his arm in a post-match assault. Cabana returned to ROH at All Star Extravaganza 2 where he teamed with Jimmy Jacobs to rescue Bobby Heenan from Generation Next. After Aries won the ROH World Championship at Final Battle, Cabana challenged him for the title at It All Begins which Aries retained. After the match, Cabana challenged Aries to a steel cage match for the title at Third Anniversary Celebration.

At Final Battle, it was announced that AJ Styles would make his return to ROH at the Third Anniversary Celebration after a nearly one-year hiatus having last appeared at At Our Best on March 13, 2004. His opponent was announced to be Jimmy Rave.

At Final Battle, Austin Aries defeated Samoa Joe to win the ROH World Championship. It was later announced that Joe would receive his rematch for the title against Aries at night three of Third Anniversary Celebration.

=== Undercard matches ===
The feud between Bryan Danielson and Homicide dated back to Reborn: Stage Two on April 24, 2004 where Homicide cheated to defeat Danielson. A rematch took place between the two at All Star Extravaganza 2 which Danielson won but Danielson was attacked by Homicide's group The Rottweilers who went too far by attempting to rip off Danielson's eye. At Final Battle, it was announced that a Match 2 of the Best of Five Series would take place between the two. Later that night, Homicide interfered in Danielson's match with Rottweilers stablemate Low Ki and attacked Danielson by injuring his arm with a chair shot. The first match of the series between the two was a submission match which took place at It All Begins on January 15, 2005, which Homicide won with assistance by Julius Smokes. After the match, Rottweilers attacked Danielson but he fended off their assault and it was announced that the second match of the series between the two would be a Taped Fist match which would take place at the Third Anniversary Celebration.

At the second night of Weekend of Thunder on November 6, Mick Foley interrupted CM Punk after Punk and Ace Steel defeated Austin Aries and Roderick Strong in a no disqualification match and insulted ROH and targeted Samoa Joe by calling him "softcore". At It All Begins, Foley confronted Joe by allowing him a spot in the Royal Rumble match but Joe said that he only wanted to face one WWE wrestler and that was Foley which resulted in Foley hitting him with a microphone and an assisted chair shot. This would set up a match between the two at Third Anniversary Celebration.

At It All Begins, Havana Pitbulls were supposed to defend the ROH Tag Team Championship against The Carnage Crew, the team of CM Punk and Steve Corino and Generation Next's Roderick Strong and Jack Evans in an Ultimate Endurance match but Evans backed out of the match due to deciding to stay with either Strong or Austin Aries in Generation Next or side with former leader Alex Shelley. Strong instead defeated Punk and Corino's disciples in a gauntlet match and later attacked Corino during the Ultimate Endurance match, thus costing him the match. This led to a No Rules match between Corino and Strong at Third Anniversary Celebration.

At the night two of Weekend of Thunder, Prince Nana helped Jimmy Rave in beating Jay Lethal in a match. However, Lethal slapped Nana after the match and retreated from the ring to avoid being attacked by The Embassy. Lethal wrestled Embassy members in various matches, leading to a match between Lethal and Rave at Third Anniversary Celebration.

At Reborn: Stage Two, Alex Shelley walked out on Jimmy Jacobs after the two lost a Scramble match. Shelley would soon form the faction Generation Next. He wrestled Jacobs in various tag team matches and two singles matches including one grudge match at Death Before Dishonor II and an "I Quit" match at Joe vs. Punk II.

== Event ==
=== Night One ===
==== Undercard matches ====
The event kicked off with Jack Evans telling Alex Shelley that he would stay in Generation Next with Austin Aries and Roderick Strong.

The opening match took place between Steve Corino and Roderick Strong. Corino's ring announcer distracted the referee and Corino's students Alex Law and Ricky Landell interfered in the match by attacking Strong. Corino countered a powerbomb by Strong and hit a lariat for the win.

Next, Jay Lethal took on Jimmy Rave to determine the #1 contender for the Pure Championship. Lethal countered a Rave Clash by Rave into a dragon suplex to win the match and received an immediate title shot against Rave's Embassy stablemate John Walters for the Pure Championship. Walters countered a dragon suplex by Lethal into three double knee backbreakers and pinned him with a roll-up by using the ropes for leverage.

Next, Billy Ken Kid took on Ebessan. Kid performed a Firebird Splash for the win.

Next, Jimmy Jacobs took on Alex Shelley. Jacobs applied Shelley's own submission maneuver Border City Stretch on Shelley but Shelley reversed it and applied the Border City Stretch on Jacobs to make him submit to the hold. Shelley extended a handshake after the match to Jacobs but Jacobs attacked him by delivering a Contra Code to Shelley.

Next, CM Punk took on Spanky. Spanky targeted Punk's leg early in the match by ramming it in the steel ring post and that affected Punk's performance throughout the match. Punk's knee injury prevented him from hitting the spike DDT, allowing Spanky to deliver a Sliced Bread #2 off the second rope for the win. Prince Nana and The Outcast Killaz (Diablo Santiago and Oman Tortuga) came after the match to offer Spanky, a spot in The Embassy but Spanky refused and retreated before he could be attacked by Embassy. Nana mocked Punk and slapped him. Punk retaliated by attacking all three men.

Next, The Havana Pitbulls (Ricky Reyes and Rocky Romero) defended the Tag Team Championship against B. J. Whitmer and Dan Maff. Maff delivered a half nelson suplex and a Burning Hammer to Romero to win the titles. After the match, Allison Danger tried to prove it as a non-title match with a contract, but Whitmer and Maff forced her to tear up the contract. Whitmer then delivered an exploder suplex and a frog splash to Danger.

After the match, a special WWE challenge was scheduled to take place between Mick Foley and Samoa Joe, where Foley would bring out a WWE wrestler to compete against Joe. Foley said he was initially supposed to bring Test but Joe was too injured to wrestle him, so he got a replacement instead and then he introduced Vordell Walker, who had never competed in WWE. Joe knocked out Walker with a Coquina Clutch for the win. After the match, a hardcore match took place between Joe and Ebessan Jack. Foley interfered in the match on Jack's behalf but Joe hit Foley with a clothesline to Foley and delivered a STO to Jack. Joe then followed by delivering a muscle buster to Jack.

Next, a Taped Fist match took place between Bryan Danielson and Homicide. It was the second match in the best of five match series between the two. Rocky Romero distracted the referee, allowing Julius Smokes to tape Homicide's first with brass knuckles. Homicide then knocked Danielson off with the taped fist for the win, taking the lead in the series with 2-0. Danielson then demanded to fight Homicide in the parking lot after the match.

It was followed by the penultimate match. It was a steel cage match, in which Austin Aries defended the World Championship against Colt Cabana. Cabana tried to escape the steel cage by climbing the cage after knocking Aries down with a brainbuster. Aries tried to prevent Cabana to slow him down but Cabana tossed him onto the mat off the ropes. Cabana then climbed the cage and tried to escape it but Aries escaped the cage by getting out of the door and retained the title.

==== Main event match ====
The main event was a Scramble match between five teams where the winning team would get ten times their pay and the losing team would be suspended for 90 days. The teams that competed in the match were The Ring Crew Express (Dunn and Marcos), Azrieal and Dixie, Generation Next (Jack Evans and Roderick Strong), Special K (Deranged and Izzy) and The Carnage Crew (DeVito and Loc). Marcos put Loc on a table and Ring Crew Express knocked him through the table by performing a double senton from the cage. As a result, Ring Crew Express would get ten times their pay in storyline while Carnage Crew were suspended for ninety days.

Once the main event ended, Bryan Danielson and Homicide brawled with each other in the parking lot until the brawl was broken off by the security.

=== Night Two ===
==== Undercard matches ====
The second night of the event started with a match between Ring Crew Express and The Air Devils (Fast Eddie and Matt Sydal), marking Air Devils' first match as a team. Sydal knocked Marcos off the top rope by hitting a springboard dropkick. Eddie then followed it by delivering a fallaway slam to Marcos for the win. Eddie turned on Sydal by attacking him after the match. The Embassy came to the ring after the match and Eddie joined the faction. Prince Nana then ordered Jimmy Rave to deliver a Rave Clash to Sydal, sending a message to the returning A.J. Styles, who would face Rave later in the show.

Next, Puma made his return to ROH after a one-year absence, having last competed at the Final Battle Convention in 2003. Puma took on Homicide in his return match. Puma avoided a Cop Killer by Homicide but Homicide took him down and applied his rival Bryan Danielson's hold Cattle Mutilation on Puma to make him submit and send a message to Danielson. Homicide continued to attack Puma after the match until Danielson tried to make the save but the security prevented him from attacking Homicide.

Next, Nigel McGuinness took on Colt Cabana. McGuinness tried to apply a Thames Barrier on Cabana but Cabana countered with McGuinness' own Artful Dodger for the win.

Next, B.J. Whitmer and Dan Maff defended the Tag Team Championship against Jimmy Jacobs and Delirious. Whitmer and Maff knocked Jacobs out of the ring by ramming him with the guardrail and then Maff returned to the ring to deliver a Burning Hammer to Delirious to retain the titles.

Next, Spanky took on the debuting James Gibson. Gibson countered a clothesline by Spanky into a Paydirt and applied a Trailer Hitch on Spanky to make him submit for the win.

Next, a Four Corner Survival match took place between Allison Danger, Daizee Haze, Lacey and Tracy Brooks. Brooks and Danger brawled with each other to the backstage, leading Haze and Lacey in the ring. Haze delivered a big boot to Lacey for the win.

Next, CM Punk took on Alex Shelley. Punk reversed a Border City Stretch by Shelley into an anaconda vice and made Shelley submit to the hold for the win. The Embassy attacked Punk after the match but Shelley made the save and forced them to retreat. Shelley then apologized to Punk for his previous actions as part of Generation Next. Punk accepted the apology but refused to aid him from any future beatdowns.

Later, the penultimate match of the night took place as Austin Aries and Jack Evans represented Generation Next against Bryan Danielson and Samoa Joe. Joe applied an over-the-shoulder single leg Boston crab on Evans to make him submit for the hold. The Rottweilers attacked Danielson and Joe after the match. Danielson and Homicide brawled with each other through the crowd, while Joe brawled with the attacker to the back.

==== Main event match ====
A.J. Styles made his return to ROH after a ten-month absence against Jimmy Rave in the main event. Prince Nana distracted Styles, allowing Rave to blind him with an aerosol spray. Rave then rolled up Styles and pinned him for the win. Embassy attacked Styles after the match until CM Punk made the save. Styles then delivered a Styles Clash to Fast Eddie.

=== Night Three ===
==== Pre-show matches ====
Before the third night started, pre-show matches took place that would be included in the Do or Die IV disc. The first pre-show match was a Four Corner Survival rematch from night two between Allison Danger, Daizee Haze, Lacey and Traci Brooks. Lacey countered a lifting reverse STO by Danger and delivered an implant DDT to Danger for the win.

The next pre-show match was actually the third match on the card, in which The Ring Crew Express (Dunn and Marcos) took on Delirious and Golden Vampire XII. Marcos delivered an electric chair drop to Vampire for the win.

==== Undercard matches ====
The actual show opened with a match between Matt Sydal and Fast Eddie. Eddie was injured while delivering a fallaway slam to Sydal, allowing Sydal to capitalize. However, Prince Nana distracted Sydal, allowing Eddie to deliver a kneeling reverse piledriver to Sydal for the win.

Next, Alex Shelley took on Jack Evans. Shelley blocked a 630° senton by Evans with his knees and applied a single leg Boston crab on Evans to make him submit for the win. Austin Aries attacked Shelley after the match and hit a brainbuster. Aries then trapped Shelley's arm in chairs and Evans delivered a 630° senton to Shelley onto the chairs.

After the match, Colt Cabana hosted an edition of his talk show segment Good Times, Great Memories in which he interviewed Bobby Heenan. However, the interview was interrupted by Jim Cornette, who wanted to take revenge from Heenan for hitting him with the tennis racket at All Star Extravaganza 2. Cornette then brought out the Tag Team Champions B.J. Whitmer and Dan Maff to wrestle and challenged Heenan to bring out to wrestlers of his own. Heenan then announced that Cabana and Nigel McGuinness would wrestle for him and the match between the two teams began immediately. Cornette interfered in the match and accidentally hit Maff with the tennis racket. Heenan then knocked Cornette out with a pair of brass knuckles. Cabana then grabbed the tennis racket and hit Maff with it and pinned him with a roll-up for the win.

It was followed by a falls count anywhere match, the third match in the Best of Five Series between Bryan Danielson and Homicide. Homicide accidentally attacked Julius Smokes, allowing Danielson to deliver a snap cradle suplex to Homicide for the win, advancing in the series with 2-1.

After the match, a backstage confrontation took place between Jimmy Jacobs and Spanky, in which Jacobs tried to explain to Spanky that his Contra Code was different than Spanky's Sliced Bread #2. Spanky told Jacobs to show him respect and not to use the move again, leading to a match between the two. Spanky blocked a Contra Code by Jacobs by hitting him with a superkick and delivered a Sliced Bread #2 to Jacobs for the win.

Next, James Gibson took on Puma. Gibson blocked a knee strike by Puma and delivered a Paydirt to Puma. Gibson followed it up by applying a Trailer Hitch on Puma to make him submit to the hold.

It was followed by the penultimate match, in which CM Punk took on Jimmy Rave. Fast Eddie distracted the referee while Punk had applied an anaconda vice on Rave. Prince Nana slid the aerosol spray into the ring and Rave sprayed Punk in the eyes with it and pinned him with a roll-up for the win. Tracy Brooks slapped Rave after the match, leading to Nana attacking her from behind and Rave hitting a Rave Clash on Brooks. Colt Cabana then made the save for Punk and Brooks with a chair forcing Embassy to retreat.

==== Main event match ====
In the main event, Austin Aries defended the World Championship against Samoa Joe. Joe avoided a 450° splash by Aries and hit him with knee strikes before applying a Coquina Clutch on Aries. However, Joe fell down on his shoulders while trying to ground Aries on the mat but Aries got his shoulders up and pinned Joe to retain the title. After the match, Colt Cabana led the ROH locker room to the ring to thank the fans for their participation in the event. The Embassy leader Prince Nana then revealed that he had sprayed CM Punk in the eyes with a bug spray during Punk's match against Jimmy Rave, due to which Punk was unable to see.

== Aftermath ==
Jay Lethal continued his pursuit of the Pure Championship, as he defeated John Walters in a rematch to win the title, marking his first championship win in ROH at Trios Tournament.

Colt Cabana and Nigel McGuinness' non-title win over B.J. Whitmer and Dan Maff at Third Anniversary Celebration earned them a Tag Team Championship match against Whitmer and Maff at Back To Basics, which they failed to win.

The Best of Five Series continued between Bryan Danielson and Homicide, as Danielson defeated Homicide in a lumberjack match at Stalemate and a steel cage match at The Final Showdown to win the series with a lead of 2-3 and end the rivalry.

CM Punk continued his feud with Embassy, facing Jimmy Rave in a rematch under the dog collar match stipulations at Manhattan Mayhem, which Rave won with assistance by The Embassy. However, Punk defeated Rave in a steel cage match at Nowhere To Run to end the rivalry. Rave would then compete against AJ Styles in a rematch from Third Anniversary Celebration where if Styles won then he could continue to use Styles Clash and if Rave won then he would continue to use Rave Clash, and the loser would be no longer allowed to use that finisher. Styles won the match, thus preventing Rave from using Rave Clash in future.

Alex Shelley earned a World Championship match against Austin Aries by winning the second fall of a double stakes four corners survival match at Stalemate. Shelley would challenge Aries for the title at Manhattan Mayhem, but failed to win the title.

== Results ==
Night One (February 19)
No.	Results	Stipulations	Times
1	Steve Corino defeated Roderick Strong	Singles match	11:12
2	Jay Lethal defeated Jimmy Rave (with Prince Nana)	Singles match to determine the #1 contender for the ROH Pure Championship	10:55
3	John Walters (c) (with Prince Nana) defeated Jay Lethal	Singles match for the ROH Pure Championship	12:55
4	Billy Ken Kid defeated Ebessan	Singles match	7:26
5	Alex Shelley defeated Jimmy Jacobs	Singles match	13:05
6	Spanky defeated CM Punk	Singles match	14:41
7	B. J. Whitmer and Dan Maff defeated The Havana Pitbulls (Ricky Reyes and Rocky Romero) (c) (with Julius Smokes)	Tag team match for the ROH Tag Team Championship	10:35
8	Samoa Joe defeated Vordell Walker (with Mick Foley)	Singles match	4:05
9	Samoa Joe defeated Ebessan Jack (with Mick Foley)	Hardcore match	6:27
10	Homicide (with Julius Smokes) defeated Bryan Danielson	Taped Fist match Match 2 of the Best of Five Series	17:53
11	Austin Aries (c) defeated Colt Cabana	Steel cage match for the ROH World Championship	20:38
12	The Ring Crew Express (Dunn and Marcos) defeated Azrieal and Dixie, Generation Next (Jack Evans and Roderick Strong), Special K (Deranged and Izzy) and The Carnage Crew (DeVito and Loc)	Scramble match	10:31
(c) / – the champion(s) heading into the match

Night Two (February 25)
No.	Results	Stipulations	Times
1	The Air Devils (Fast Eddie and Matt Sydal) defeated The Ring Crew Express (Dunn and Marcos)	Tag team match	8:42
2	Homicide (with Julius Smokes) defeated Puma	Singles match	10:00
3	Colt Cabana defeated Nigel McGuinness	Singles match	12:08
4	B. J. Whitmer and Dan Maff (c) defeated Delirious and Jimmy Jacobs	Tag team match for the ROH Tag Team Championship	9:28
5	James Gibson defeated Spanky	Singles match	13:28
6	Daizee Haze defeated Allison Danger, Lacey and Tracy Brooks	Four Corner Survival match	6:20
7	CM Punk defeated Alex Shelley	Singles match	22:00
8	Bryan Danielson and Samoa Joe defeated Generation Next (Austin Aries and Jack Evans)	Tag team match	23:14
9	Jimmy Rave (with Prince Nana) defeated A.J. Styles	Singles match	22:07
(c) / – the champion(s) heading into the match

Night Three (February 26)
No.	Results	Stipulations	Times
1^{P}	Lacey defeated Daizee Haze, Allison Danger and Tracy Brooks	Four Corner Survival match	10:48
2^{P}	The Ring Crew Express (Dunn and Marcos) defeated Delirious and Golden Vampire XII	Tag team match	9:01
3	Fast Eddie (with Jimmy Rave and Prince Nana) defeated Matt Sydal	Singles match	10:09
4	Alex Shelley defeated Jack Evans	Singles match	13:48
5	Colt Cabana and Nigel McGuinness (with Bobby Heenan) defeated B. J. Whitmer and Dan Maff (with Jim Cornette)	Tag team match	16:34
6	Bryan Danielson defeated Homicide (with Julius Smokes)	Falls Count Anywhere match Match 3 of the Best of Five Series	19:36
7	Spanky defeated Jimmy Jacobs	Singles match	10:48
8	James Gibson defeated Puma	Singles match	12:58
9	Jimmy Rave (with Fast Eddie and Prince Nana) defeated CM Punk (with Davey Andrews and Tracy Brooks)	Singles match	19:43
10	Austin Aries (c) defeated Samoa Joe	Singles match for the ROH World Championship	17:13
(c) / – the champion(s) heading into the match; P / – the match was broadcast on the pre-show

== See also ==
- 2005 in professional wrestling
- List of Ring of Honor pay-per-view events
