= ROH The Fifth Year Festival =

2007 Ring of Honor event

ROH Fifth Year Anniversary Festival
- Promotion: Ring of Honor (ROH)
- Date: Night One: February 16, 2007; Night Two: February 17, 2007; Night Three: February 23, 2007; Night Four: February 24, 2007; Night Five: March 3, 2007; Night Six: March 4, 2007
- City: Night One: New York City; Night Two: Philadelphia; Night Three: Dayton, Ohio; Night Four: Chicago; Night Five: Liverpool, England; Night Six: Liverpool, England
- Venue: Night One: Manhattan Center; Night Two: Pennsylvania National Guard Armory; Night Three: Montgomery County Fairground Coliseum; Night Four: Windy City Fieldhouse; Night Five: Liverpool Olympia; Night Six: Liverpool Olympia
- Attendance: Night One: 1,200; Night Two: 800; Night Three: 700; Night Four: 950; Night Five: 1,300; Night Six: 1,250

ROH Anniversary Show chronology
← Previous; 4th Anniversary	Next → 6th Anniversary

Event chronology
← Previous; Battle of the Icons	Next → All Star Extravaganza III

ROH Fifth Year Anniversary Festival was the fifth Anniversary Show professional wrestling event produced by Ring of Honor (ROH). It was a 6-night event which took place on February 16, 17, 23, 24, March 3 and 4th of 2007 at different venues.

== Production ==
=== Storylines ===
Other on-screen personnel
Role	Name
Commentators	Dave Prazak
Commentators	Lenny Leonard

ROH Fifth Anniversary Festival featured fifty-three different professional wrestling matches in six separate nights that involved different wrestlers from pre-existing scripted feuds and storylines. Wrestlers were portrayed as either villains or heroes in the scripted events that built tension and culminated in a wrestling match involving.

== Results ==
Night One (February 16: New York)
No.	Results	Stipulations	Times
1	Takeshi Morishima defeated Pelle Primeau	Singles match	0:08
2	Delirious defeated Adam Pearce (with Shane Hagadorn)	Singles match Grudge Match	8:00
3	The Dangerous Angels (Sara Del Rey & Allison Danger) defeated Alexa Thatcher & Daizee Haze	Women of Honor Tag team match	3:16
4	Jack Evans defeated Jimmy Jacobs (with Lacey), Shingo and Xavier	4-Way Elimination match	9:50
5	BJ Whitmer defeated Brent Albright	Tables Are Legal Match	13:54
6	Christopher Daniels and Matt Sydal (c) (with Allison Danger) defeated Austin Aries and Roderick Strong	Tag team match for the ROH World Tag Team Championships	20:45
7	Colt Cabana and Nigel McGuinness defeated The Briscoes (Jay & Mark Briscoe)	Tag team match	14:34
8	Samoa Joe defeated Takeshi Morishima	Singles match	18:06
9	Homicide (c) (with Julius Smokes) defeated Jimmy Rave	Singles match for ROH World Championship	18:54
(c) / – the champion(s) heading into the match

Night Two (February 17: Philadelphia)
No.	Results	Stipulations	Times
1^{D}	Pelle Primeau & Rhett Titus defeated Alex Payne & Bobby Dempsey	Tag team match	—
2^{D}	Shane Hagadorn (c) defeated Alex Payne	Singles match for the ROH Top of the Class Trophy Championship	—
3^{D}	Sara Del Ray defeated Mitch Franklin	Intergender Singles match	—
4	Nigel McGuinness defeated TJ Perkins	Singles match	5:59
5	Austin Aries defeated Claudio Castagnoli	Singles match	9:00
6	BJ Whitmer, Colt Cabana & Daizee Haze defeated Adam Pearce, Jimmy Jacobs & Lacey	6-Man Mixed Tag Team Street Fight Match	13:31
7	The Briscoes (Jay & Mark Briscoe) defeated El Generico & Kevin Steen	Tag team match	18:02
8	Samoa Joe defeated Jimmy Rave	Singles match	16:09
9	Roderick Strong (c) defeated Delirious via Count-out	Singles match for the FIP Heavyweight Championship	9:18
10	Christopher Daniels and Matt Sydal (c) defeated Jack Evans and SHINGO	Tag team match for the ROH World Tag Team Championships	20:06
11	Takeshi Morishima defeated Homicide (c)	Singles match for the ROH World Championship	16:55
(c) / – the champion(s) heading into the match; D / – this was a dark match

Night Three (February 23: Dayton)
No.	Results	Stipulations	Times
1^{D}	Sara Del Ray defeated Josie	Women of Honor Singles match	2:45
2	Colt Cabana and Nigel McGuinness defeated Jimmy Jacobs and Brent Albright (with Lacey)	Tag team match	13:03
3	Jimmy Rave defeated Sterling James Keenan	Singles match	5:50
4	Lacey (with Jimmy Jacobs) defeated Daizee Haze	Women of Honor Singles match Grudge Match	8:17
5	Homicide defeated Christopher Daniels (with Allison Danger) and Jay Briscoe	Triple threat match	13:04
6	Matt Sydal (c) defeated Austin Aries	Singles match for the Open The Gate Championship	13:44
7	Tank Toland (with Larry Sweeney) defeated Mitch Franklin	Singles match	1:57
8	Claudio Castagnoli defeated Mark Briscoe, Matt Cross, Pelle Primeau, Roderick Strong and Shingo	Six-Man Mayhem match	15:34
9	Samoa Joe defeated Davey Richards	Singles match	19:43
10	Takeshi Morishima (c) defeated BJ Whitmer	Singles match for the ROH World Championship	14:10
(c) / – the champion(s) heading into the match; D / – this was a dark match

Night Four (February 24: Chicago)
No.	Results	Stipulations	Times
1	Brent Albright (with Larry Sweeney) defeated Claudio Castagnoli	Singles match	11:38
2	The Dangerous Angels (Sara Del Rey & Allison Danger) defeated MsChif & Serena Deeb	Women of Honor Tag team match	7:27
3	Matt Cross defeated CJ Otis, SHINGO and Trik Davis	Four Corner Survival match	11:03
4	Jimmy Rave defeated BJ Whitmer	Singles match	10:52
5	The Briscoes (Jay & Mark Briscoe) defeated Christopher Daniels and Matt Sydal (c) (with Allison Danger)	Tag team match for the ROH World Tag Team Championships	24:50
6	Austin Aries and Matt Cross defeated No Remorse Corps (Roderick Strong and Davey Richards)	Tag team match	14:35
7	Colt Cabana defeated Jimmy Jacobs (with Lacey)	Windy City Death Match	22:55
8	Takeshi Morishima and Nigel McGuinness defeated Samoa Joe and Homicide	Tag team match	23:10
(c) / – the champion(s) heading into the match

Night Five (March 3: Liverpool)
No.	Results	Stipulations	Times
1	Homicide (with Julius Smokes) defeated Davey Richards	Singles match	16:10
2	Sara Del Rey defeated Allison Danger	Women of Honor Singles match	8:29
3	Jimmy Jacobs and Jimmy Rave defeated BJ Whitmer and Colt Cabana	Tag team match Grudge Match	13:43
4	Matt Sydal defeated Delirious (2 to 1)	2 out of 3 Falls match	23:22
5	Roderick Strong (c) defeated PAC	Singles match for the FIP World Heavyweight Championship	18:09
6	Naruki Doi & Shingo defeated The Briscoes (Jay & Mark Briscoe) (c)	Tag team match for the ROH World Tag Team Championships	22:40
7	Samoa Joe defeated Nigel McGuinness	Singles match	22:53
(c) / – the champion(s) heading into the match

Night Six (March 4: Liverpool; Finale)
No.	Results	Stipulations	Times
1	Delirious defeated Colt Cabana	Singles match	11:43
2	The Dangerous Angels (Sara Del Rey & Allison Danger) defeated Jetta & Eden Black	Women of Honor Tag team match	6:28
3	BJ Whitmer defeated Jimmy Jacobs	Singles match	12:32
4	Matt Sydal defeated PAC	Singles match	11:25
5	Jay Briscoe vs. Mark Briscoe ended in a Draw via Double KO	Singles match	27:05
6	Naruki Doi & Shingo (c) defeated No Remorse Corps (Roderick Strong and Davey Richards)	Tag team match for the ROH World Tag Team Championships	19:34
7	Nigel McGuinness defeated Jimmy Rave	Fight Without Honor match	21:17
8	Samoa Joe defeated Homicide	Singles match	23:01
(c) / – the champion(s) heading into the match

== See also ==
- 2007 in professional wrestling
- List of Ring of Honor pay-per-view events
