= ROH Fourth Anniversary Show =

2006 Ring of Honor event

- Promotion: Ring of Honor
- Date: February 25, 2006
- City: Edison, New Jersey
- Venue: Inman Sports Club
- Attendance: 2,500

Pay-per-view chronology
← Previous; Unscripted II	Next → Best in the World

ROH Anniversary Show chronology
← Previous; 2005	Next → 2007

ROH Fourth Anniversary Show is a major professional wrestling event produced by Ring of Honor (ROH). It took place on February 25, 2006 from the Inman Sports Club in Edison, New Jersey.

This was the fourth annual event in the ROH Anniversary Show chronology, with the first taking place in 2003.

== Production ==
=== Storylines ===
Other on-screen personnel
Role	Name
Commentators	Dave Prazak
Commentators	Jimmy Bower
Commentators	Lenny Leonard

ROH Fourth Anniversary Show featured twelve different professional wrestling matches that involved different wrestlers from pre-existing scripted feuds and storylines. Wrestlers were portrayed as either villains or heroes in the scripted events that built tension and culminated in a wrestling match involving.

The shows main event is Generation Next (Austin Aries & Roderick Strong) vs. AJ Styles & Matt Sydal for the ROH World Tag Team Championship.

=== Background ===
It was also the fourth ROH Anniversary Show event in Ring of Honor history.

== Results ==
No.	Results	Stipulations	Times
1^{D}	Handsome Johnny defeated Pelle Primeau	Singles match	—
2^{D}	Derek Dempsey & Rhett Titus defeated Jason King & Smash Bradley	Tag team match	—
3^{D}	BJ Whitmer defeated Shane Hagadorn	Singles match	—
4	The Briscoes (Jay Briscoe & Mark Briscoe) defeated Jason Blade & Kid Mikaze and Sal Rinauro & Tony Mamaluke	Triple threat tag team match	6:46
5	Adam Pearce defeated Azrieal and Claudio Castagnoli and Jay Fury	Four corner survival match	11:20
6	Samoa Joe defeated Jay Lethal	Singles match	14:21
7	BJ Whitmer vs. Christopher Daniels (with Allison Danger & Lacey) ended in a no contest	Singles match	5:00
8	Homicide (with Julius Smokes) defeated Colt Cabana	Ghetto Street Fight	18:56
9	Bobby Dempsey defeated Mitch Franklin	Singles match	2:15
10	Bryan Danielson (c) defeated Jimmy Rave (with Prince Nana)	Singles match for the ROH World Championship	32:05
11	Ricky Reyes (with Julius Smokes) defeated Jack Evans	Singles match	7:57
12	Generation Next (Austin Aries & Roderick Strong) (c) defeated AJ Styles & Matt Sydal	Tag team match for the ROH World Tag Team Championship	23:11
(c) / – the champion(s) heading into the match; D / – this was a dark match

== See also ==
- List of Ring of Honor special events
- List of Ring of Honor pay-per-view events
