= Death Before Dishonor III =

2005 Ring of Honor event

- Promotion: Ring of Honor (ROH)
- Date: June 18, 2005
- City: Morristown, New Jersey
- Venue: Mennen Sports Arena
- Attendance: 900

Pay-per-view chronology
← Previous; 3rd Anniversary Show	Next → Night of Grudges II

Death Before Dishonor chronology
← Previous; 2004	Next → 2006

Death Before Dishonor III is a major professional wrestling event produced by Ring of Honor (ROH). It took place on June 18, 2005 from the Mennen Sports Arena in Morristown, New Jersey.

This was the third annual event in the Death Before Dishonor chronology, with the first taking place in 2003.

== Production ==
=== Storylines ===
Other on-screen personnel
Role	Name
Commentators	CM Punk
Commentators	Dave Prazak
Commentators	Jimmy Bower

Death Before Dishonor III featured nine different professional wrestling matches that involved different wrestlers from pre-existing scripted feuds and storylines. Wrestlers were portrayed as either villains or heroes in the scripted events that built tension and culminated in a wrestling match involving.

The shows main event is CM Punk vs. Austin Aries for the ROH World Championship.

=== Background ===
It was also the third Death Before Dishonor event in Ring of Honor history.

== Results ==
No.	Results	Stipulations	Times
1	BJ Whitmer & Jimmy Jacobs (c) defeated The Embassy (Fast Eddie & Jimmy Rave) (with Diablo Santiago, Jade Chung, Mike Kruel, Oman Tortuga & Prince Nana)	Tag team match for the ROH World Tag Team Championship	10:20
2	Lacey defeated Cidney Rogers	Women of Honor Singles match	—
3	The Carnage Crew (DeVito & Loc) defeated The Ring Crew Express (Dunn & Marcos)	Anything Goes Tag team match	8:35
4	Samoa Joe (c) defeated Colt Cabana	Singles match for the ROH Pure Championship	14:05
5	AJ Styles defeated Petey Williams (with Diablo Santiago, Fast Eddie, Jade Chung, Mike Kruel, Oman Tortuga & Prince Nana)	Singles match	16:35
6	Lacey's Angels (Deranged & Izzy) (with Cheech, Cloudy & Lacey) defeated Generation Next (Jack Evans & Roderick Strong)	Tag team match	12:31
7	Nigel McGuinness defeated Azrieal and Homicide (with Julius Smokes) and James Gibson	Four corner survival match	20:26
8	Jay Lethal vs. Low Ki (with Julius Smokes) ended in a no contest	Singles match	15:10
9	CM Punk defeated Austin Aries (c)	Singles match for the ROH World Championship	30:26
(c) / – the champion(s) heading into the match

== See also ==
- List of Ring of Honor special events
- List of Ring of Honor pay-per-view events
