= 2005 in professional wrestling =

2005 in professional wrestling describes the year's events in the world of professional wrestling.

== List of notable promotions ==
These promotions held notable events in 2005.

Promotion Name	Abbreviation	Notes
Consejo Mundial de Lucha Libre	CMLL	
Georgia Championship Wrestling	GCW	
Lucha Libre AAA Worldwide	AAA	The "AAA" abbreviation has been used since the mid-1990s and had previously stood for the promotion's original name Asistencia Asesoría y Administración.
New Breed Wrestling Association	NBWA	
New Japan Pro-Wrestling	NJPW	
Pro Wrestling Guerrilla	PWG	
Ring of Honor	ROH	
Total Nonstop Action Wrestling	TNA	
World Wrestling Council	WWC	
World Wrestling Entertainment	WWE	WWE divided its roster into two storyline divisions, Raw and SmackDown!, referred to as brands, where wrestlers exclusively performed on their respective weekly television programs.

== Calendar of notable shows ==
=== January ===
Date	Promotion(s)	Event	Location	Main event	Notes
4	NJPW	Toukon Festival: Wrestling World	Tokyo, Japan	Shinsuke Nakamura defeated Hiroshi Tanahashi (c) in a Singles match to win the IWGP U-30 Openweight Championship	
9	WWE: Raw	New Year's Revolution	San Juan, Puerto Rico	Triple H defeated Edge, Chris Benoit, Chris Jericho, Batista, and Randy Orton in an Elimination Chamber match to win the vacant World Heavyweight Championship with Shawn Michaels as special guest referee	
16	TNA	Final Resolution	Orlando	Jeff Jarrett (c) defeated Monty Brown in a Singles match to retain the NWA World Heavyweight Championship	
30	WWE: Raw; SmackDown!	Royal Rumble	Fresno, California	Batista won the 30-man Royal Rumble match by last eliminating John Cena to earn a world championship match at WrestleMania 21	Batista chose to challenge for the World Heavyweight Championship.
(c) – denotes defending champion(s)

=== February ===
Date	Promotion(s)	Event	Location	Main event
13	TNA	Against All Odds	Orlando	Jeff Jarrett (c) defeated Kevin Nash in a Singles match to retain the NWA World Heavyweight Championship
19	ROH	Third Anniversary Celebration: Part 1	Elizabeth, New Jersey	The Carnage Crew (H. C. Loc & Tony DeVito) vs. Generation Next (Roderick Strong & Jack Evans) vs. The Ring Crew Express (Dunn & Marcos) vs. Special K (Azrieal & Dixie) vs. Special K (Izzy & Deranged) in a Scramble Cage Match
20	WWE: SmackDown!	No Way Out	Pittsburgh, Pennsylvania	John "Bradshaw" Layfield (c) defeated Big Show in a Barbed Wired Steel Cage match to retain the WWE Championship
25	ROH	Third Anniversary Celebration: Part 2	Dayton, Ohio	Jimmy Rave defeated A.J. Styles in a Singles match
26	ROH	Third Anniversary Celebration: Part 3	Chicago Ridge, Illinois	Austin Aries (c) defeated Samoa Joe in a Singles match to retain the ROH World Championship
(c) – denotes defending champion(s)

=== March ===
Date	Promotion(s)	Event	Location	Main event
11	AAA	Rey de Reyes	Ciudad Madero, Mexico	Elimination match: finals of the 2005 Rey de Reyes tournament.
13	TNA	Destination X	Orlando	Jeff Jarrett (c) defeated Diamond Dallas Page in a Singles match to retain the NWA World Heavyweight Championship
18	NBWA	Mike Lockwood Memorial Tournament	South Bend, Indiana	B. J. Whitmer defeated Nigel McGuiness (c) in a Singles match for the NBWA Heavyweight Championship
(c) – denotes defending champion(s)

=== April ===
Date	Promotion(s)	Event	Location	Main event	Notes
3	WWE: Raw; SmackDown!	WrestleMania 21	Los Angeles, California	Batista defeated Triple H (c) in a Singles match to win the World Heavyweight Championship	The event also featured the return of Stone Cold Steve Austin who started his part-time appearances with WWE at this event. First event to feature the Money in the Bank ladder match
8	CMLL	49. Aniversario de Arena México	Mexico City, Mexico	Los Perros del Mal (Damián 666, Halloween and Pierroth) defeated Dr. Wagner Jr., Místico and Negro Casas by disqualification	
24	TNA	Lockdown	Orlando	A.J. Styles defeated Abyss in Six Sides of Steel match for an NWA World Heavyweight Championship match at Hard Justice	
(c) – denotes defending champion(s)

=== May ===
Date	Promotion(s)	Event	Location	Main event
1	WWE: Raw	Backlash	Manchester, New Hampshire	Batista (c) defeated Triple H in a Singles match to retain the World Heavyweight Championship
5	N/A	Mark Curtis Memorial Reunion	Johnson City, Tennessee	Mick Foley and Shane Douglas defeated Al Snow and D'Lo Brown
15	AAA	Triplemanía XIII	Guadalajara, Jalisco, Mexico	Latin Lover, La Parka and Octagón defeated Los Hell Brothers (Chessman and Cibernético) and Fuerza Guerrera
15	TNA	Hard Justice	Orlando	A.J. Styles defeated Jeff Jarrett (c) in a Singles match to win the NWA World Heavyweight Championship with Tito Ortiz as Special Guest Referee
22	WWE: SmackDown!	Judgment Day	Minneapolis, Minnesota	John Cena (c) defeated John "Bradshaw" Layfield in a "I Quit" match to retain the WWE Championship
(c) – denotes defending champion(s)

=== June ===
Date	Promotion(s)	Event	Location	Main event	Notes
12	WWE	ECW One Night Stand	New York City	The Dudley Boyz (Bubba Ray Dudley and D-Von Dudley) defeated Tommy Dreamer and The Sandman in a Tag team match	This event was The Dudley Boyz and Rhyno's last appearance in WWE until 2015; Last PPV appearance for many wrestlers including Mike Awesome; First event produced by WWE to promote the former Extreme Championship Wrestling promotion. This would be the genesis of the launch of the ECW brand the following year.
18	ROH	Death Before Dishonor III	Morristown, New Jersey	CM Punk defeated Austin Aries (c) in a Singles match to win the ROH World Championship	
19	TNA	Slammiversary	Orlando	Raven defeated A.J. Styles (c), Abyss, Monty Brown and Sean Waltman in the King of the Mountain match to win the NWA World Heavyweight Championship	This event was Samoa Joe's debut in TNA
26	WWE: Raw	Vengeance	Las Vegas, Nevada	Batista (c) defeated Triple H in a Hell in a Cell match to retain the World Heavyweight Championship	
(c) – denotes defending champion(s)

=== July ===
Date	Promotion(s)	Event	Location	Main event	Notes
17	TNA	No Surrender	Orlando	Raven (c) defeated Abyss in a Dog Collar match to retain the NWA World Heavyweight Championship	This event was Rhyno's debut in TNA
24	WWE: SmackDown!	The Great American Bash	Buffalo, New York	John "Bradshaw" Layfield defeated Batista (c) by disqualification in a Singles match for the World Heavyweight Championship	
(c) – denotes defending champion(s)

=== August ===
Date	Promotion(s)	Event	Location	Main event	Notes
4-14	NJPW	G1 Climax final	Tokyo	Masahiro Chono defeated Kazuyuki Fujita in a G1 Climax tournament	
6	GCW	Second Annual Fred Ward Memorial Show	Columbus, Georgia	David Young and Chris Stevens defeated Erik Watts and Sonny Siaki	
14	TNA	Sacrifice	Orlando	Jeff Jarrett and Rhino defeated Raven and Sabu in a Tag team match	
21	WWE: Raw; SmackDown!	SummerSlam	Washington, D.C.	Hulk Hogan defeated Shawn Michaels in a Singles match	Last PPV appearance of Chris Jericho in WWE until late 2007, he lost to John Cena on the following night's Raw in a Loser Leaves WWE match as his contract expired after.
(c) – denotes defending champion(s)

=== September ===
Date	Promotion(s)	Event	Location	Main event
3–4	PWG	Battle of Los Angeles	Los Angeles, California	Chris Bosh defeated A.J. Styles in a Battle of Los Angeles tournament
11	TNA	Unbreakable	Orlando	A.J. Styles defeated Christopher Daniels (c) and Samoa Joe in a Triple threat match to win the TNA X Division Championship
16	CMLL	CMLL 72nd Anniversary Show	Mexico City, Mexico	Héctor Garza lost to Perro Aguayo Jr. and Universo 2000 in a Lucha de Apuestas hair vs. hair vs. hair elimination match
17	ROH	Glory By Honor IV	Lake Grove, New York	A.J. Styles defeated Jimmy Rave in a Finishers match
18	AAA	Verano de Escándalo	Veracruz, Mexico	Electrified steel cage match "Loser has his head shaved" match.
18	WWE: Raw	Unforgiven	Oklahoma City, Oklahoma	Kurt Angle defeated John Cena (c) by disqualification in a Singles match for the WWE Championship
23	CMLL	International Gran Prix	Mexico City, Mexico	Místico defeated Último Guerrero by disqualification in a Best two-out-of-three falls match
(c) – denotes defending champion(s)

=== October ===
Date	Promotion(s)	Event	Location	Main event	Notes
9	WWE: SmackDown!	No Mercy	Houston, Texas	Batista (c) defeated Eddie Guerrero in a Singles match to retain the World Heavyweight Championship	Last PPV appearance for Eddie Guerrero before his death in November
23	TNA	Bound for Glory	Orlando	Rhino defeated Jeff Jarrett (c) in a Singles match to win the NWA World Heavyweight Championship with Tito Ortiz as special guest referee	The show was promoted as TNA's premiere PPV event and their equivalent to the rival WWE's WrestleMania.
(c) – denotes defending champion(s)

=== November ===
Date	Promotion(s)	Event	Location	Main event	Notes
1	WWE: Raw	Taboo Tuesday	San Diego, California	John Cena (c) defeated Kurt Angle and Shawn Michaels in a Triple threat match to retain the WWE Championship	Last PPV appearance of Christian in WWE until 2009. This event was also involved the SmackDown! roster.
5	WWC	32nd WWC Aniversario	Bayamón, Puerto Rico	Carlito defeated Shane	
13	TNA	Genesis	Orlando	Team 3D (Brother Ray and Brother Devon) and Rhino defeated America's Most Wanted (Chris Harris and James Storm) and Jeff Jarrett in a Six-man tag team match	This event was Christian (under new ring name Christian Cage)'s debut in TNA; It was also dedicated to WWE wrestler Eddie Guerrero, who died the day of the show. It was Team 3D's first PPV match in TNA
27	WWE: Raw; SmackDown!	Survivor Series	Detroit, Michigan	Team SmackDown! (Batista, Rey Mysterio, John "Bradshaw" Layfield, Bobby Lashley, and Randy Orton) defeated Team Raw (Shawn Michaels, Kane, Big Show, Carlito, and Chris Masters) in a 5-on-5 Survivor Series elimination match	Eddie Guerrero was booked to be the captain of Team SmackDown! before his death, after his death he was replaced by Batista
(c) – denotes defending champion(s)

=== December ===
Date	Promotion(s)	Event	Location	Main event
2	CMLL	Juicio Final	Mexico City, Mexico	Universo 2000 defeated Halloween in a Best two-out-of-three falls Lucha de Apuestas, hair vs. hair match
10	AAA	Guerra de Titanes	Guadalajara, Jalisco, Mexico	Abismo Negro, Latin Lover and La Parka, defeated La Secta Cibernetica (Cibernético, Dark Cuervo, and Dark Escoria)
11	TNA	Turning Point	Orlando	Jeff Jarrett (c) defeated Rhino in a Singles match to retain the NWA World Heavyweight Championship
17	ROH	Final Battle 2005	Edison, New Jersey	Kenta (c) defeated Low Ki to retain the GHC Junior Heavyweight Championship
18	WWE: SmackDown!	Armageddon	Providence, Rhode Island	The Undertaker defeated Randy Orton in Hell in a Cell match
19	WWE: Raw	Tribute to the Troops	Bagram, Afghanistan	Shawn Michaels defeated Triple H in a Boot Camp match
(c) – denotes defending champion(s)

== Accomplishments and tournaments ==
=== AAA ===
Accomplishment	Winner	Date won	Notes
Rey de Reyes	La Parka	March 11	

=== Ring of Honor ===
Accomplishment	Winner	Date won	Notes
Best of the American Super Juniors Tournament	Dragon Soldier B	April 2	

=== TNA ===
Accomplishment	Winner	Date won	Notes
2005 TNA Super X Cup Tournament	Samoa Joe	August 14	
Chris Candido Memorial Tag Team Tournament	Alex Shelley and Sean Waltman	August 16	

==== TNA Year End Awards ====
Poll	Winner(s)
Tag Team of the Year	Team 3D (Brother Devon and Brother Ray)
Knockout of the Year	Jackie Gayda
Finisher of the Year	The Canadian Destroyer
Who To Watch in 2006	Christian Cage
Memorable Moment of the Year	Christian Cage debuts at Genesis
X Division Star of the Year	A.J. Styles
Feud of the Year	A.J. Styles and Christopher Daniels
Match of the Year	Barbed Wire Massacre: Abyss vs. Sabu at Turning Point
Mr. TNA	A.J. Styles

=== WWE ===
Accomplishment	Winner	Date won	Notes
Royal Rumble	Batista	January 30	Winner received their choice of a championship match for either Raw's World Heavyweight Championship or SmackDown's WWE Championship at WrestleMania 21. Batista last eliminated John Cena to win and chose to challenge for his own brand's World Heavyweight Championship, which he subsequently won from Triple H.
Money in the Bank ladder match	Edge	April 3	This was the inaugural match. Edge defeated Chris Benoit, Chris Jericho, Christian, Kane, and Shelton Benjamin to win a world championship match contract. Edge cashed in the contract and won the WWE Championship from John Cena at the following year's New Year's Revolution after Cena had just retained the title in an Elimination Chamber match.
WWE Championship #1 Contender's Tournament	John Cena	February 20	Defeated Kurt Angle in the tournament final to win a WWE Championship match against John "Bradshaw" Layfield at WrestleMania 21, which Cena subsequently won.
WWE Championship #1 Contender's Tournament	John "Bradshaw" Layfield	April 26	Defeated Kurt Angle, Booker T, and Big Show in the tournament final to win a WWE Championship match against John Cena at Judgment Day. JBL, however, was unsuccessful in winning the title.
Gold Rush Tournament	Edge	May 16	Defeated Kane in the tournament final to win a World Heavyweight Championship match against Batista on the May 23 episode of Raw, but was unsuccessful in winning the title.

==== WWE Hall of Fame ====
Category	Inductee	Inducted by
Individual	Hulk Hogan	Sylvester Stallone
Individual	"Rowdy" Roddy Piper	Ric Flair
Individual	"Cowboy" Bob Orton Jr.	Randy Orton
Individual	Jimmy Hart	Jerry Lawler
Individual	"Mr. Wonderful" Paul Orndorff	Bobby Heenan
Individual	Nikolai Volkoff	Jim Ross
Individual	Iron Sheik	Sgt. Slaughter

== Awards and honors ==
=== Pro Wrestling Illustrated ===
Category	Winner
PWI Wrestler of the Year	Batista
PWI Tag Team of the Year	MNM (Joey Mercury and Johnny Nitro)
PWI Match of the Year	Shawn Michaels vs. Kurt Angle (WrestleMania 21)
PWI Feud of the Year	Matt Hardy vs. Edge and Lita
PWI Most Popular Wrestler of the Year	John Cena
PWI Most Hated Wrestler of the Year	Triple H
PWI Comeback of the Year	Road Warrior Animal
PWI Most Improved Wrestler of the Year	Batista
PWI Most Inspirational Wrestler of the Year	Chris Candido
PWI Rookie of the Year	Bobby Lashley
PWI Woman of the Year	Trish Stratus
PWI Lifetime Achievement	Eddie Guerrero

=== Wrestling Observer Newsletter ===
==== Wrestling Observer Newsletter Hall of Fame ====
Category	Inductee
Individual	Paul Heyman
Individual	Triple H
Group	The Fabulous Freebirds (Michael Hayes, Terry Gordy, and Buddy Roberts)

==== Wrestling Observer Newsletter awards ====
Category	Winner
Wrestler of the Year	Kenta Kobashi
Most Outstanding	Samoa Joe
Best Box Office Draw	Místico
Feud of the Year	Batista vs. Triple H
Tag Team of the Year	America's Most Wanted (Chris Harris and James Storm)
Most Improved	Roderick Strong
Best on Interviews	Eddie Guerrero

== Title changes ==
=== NJPW ===
IWGP Heavyweight Championship
Incoming champion – Hiroyoshi Tenzan
Date	Winner	Event/Show	Note(s)
February 20	Satoshi Kojima	New Year Gold Series	
May 14	Hiroyoshi Tenzan	Nexess VI	
July 18	Kazuyuki Fujita	Summer Fight Series	
October 8	Brock Lesnar	Toukon Souzou New Chapter	

IWGP Tag Team Championship
Incoming champions – Hiroshi Tanahashi and Shinsuke Nakamura
Date	Winner	Event/Show	Note(s)
October 30	Cho-Ten (Hiroyoshi Tenzan and Masahiro Chono)	Toukon Series	

IWGP Junior Heavyweight Championship
Incoming champion – Heat
Date	Winner	Event/Show	Note(s)
January 4	Tiger Mask IV	Toukon Festival: Wrestling World	
October 8	Black Tiger	Toukon Souzou New Chapter	

IWGP Junior Heavyweight Tag Team Championship
Incoming champions – Gedo and Jado
Date	Winner	Event/Show	Note(s)
March 4	American Dragon and Curry Man	Big Fight Series	
May 14	Hirooki Goto and Minoru	Nexess VI	

=== TNA ===
TNA X Division Championship
Incoming champion – Petey Williams
Date	Winner	Event/Show	Note(s)
January 16	A.J. Styles	Final Resolution	
March 13	Christopher Daniels	Destination X	
September 11	A.J. Styles	Unbreakable	
December 11	Samoa Joe	Turning Point	

=== WWE ===
– Raw
– SmackDown

Raw and SmackDown each had a world championship, a secondary championship, and a tag team championship for male wrestlers. SmackDown also had a title for their cruiserweight wrestlers. There was only one women's championship and it was exclusive to Raw.

World Heavyweight Championship
Incoming champion – Vacant
Date	Winner	Event/Show	Note(s)
January 9	Triple H	New Year's Revolution	Elimination Chamber match for the vacant title, also involving Chris Benoit, Chris Jericho, Randy Orton, Batista, and Edge. Shawn Michaels was the special guest referee.
April 3	Batista	WrestleMania 21	
The title became exclusive to the SmackDown! brand following the 2005 WWE draft lottery when Batista was drafted to SmackDown.

WWE Championship
Incoming champion – John "Bradshaw" Layfield
Date	Winner	Event/Show	Note(s)
April 3	John Cena	WrestleMania 21	
The title became exclusive to the Raw brand following the 2005 WWE draft lottery when John Cena was drafted to Raw.

WWE Intercontinental Championship
Incoming champion – Shelton Benjamin
Date	Winner	Event/Show	Note(s)
June 20	Carlito	Monday Night Raw	
September 18	Ric Flair	Unforgiven	

WWE United States Championship
Incoming champion – John Cena
Date	Winner	Event/Show	Note(s)
March 1 (aired March 3)	Orlando Jordan	SmackDown!	
August 21	Chris Benoit	SummerSlam	
October 18 (aired October 21)	Booker T	SmackDown!	
November 22 (aired November 25)	Vacated	SmackDown!	Vacated when Booker T's title defense against Chris Benoit ended in a double pinfall.

WWE Women's Championship
Incoming champion – Lita
Date	Winner	Event/Show	Note(s)
January 9	Trish Stratus	New Year's Revolution	

World Tag Team Championship
Incoming champions – Eugene and William Regal
Date	Winner	Event/Show	Note(s)
January 16	La Résistance (Robért Conway and Sylvain Grenier)	House show	Jonathan Coachman replaced Eugene in this match due to injury.
February 4 (aired February 7)	William Regal and Tajiri	Monday Night Raw	
May 1	The Hurricane and Rosey	Backlash	Tag team turmoil match, also involving The Heart Throbs, Simon Dean and Maven, and La Résistance.
September 18	Lance Cade and Trevor Murdoch	Unforgiven	
November 1	Kane and Big Show	Taboo Tuesday	Kane and Big Show were voted into this match as a result of neither winning the WWE Championship voting.

WWE Tag Team Championship
Incoming champions – Rey Mysterio and Rob Van Dam
Date	Winner	Event/Show	Note(s)
January 11 (aired January 13)	The Basham Brothers (Doug and Danny Basham)	SmackDown!	Fatal four-way tag team elimination match, also involving the teams of Mark Jindrak and Luther Reigns, and Booker T and Eddie Guerrero.
February 20	Eddie Guerrero and Rey Mysterio	No Way Out	
April 18 (aired April 21)	MNM (Joey Mercury and Johnny Nitro)	SmackDown!	
July 24	The Legion of Doom (Animal and Heidenreich)	The Great American Bash	
October 25 (aired October 28)	MNM (Joey Mercury and Johnny Nitro)	SmackDown!	Fatal four-way tag team match, also involving The Mexicools, and the team of Paul Burchill and William Regal.
December 13 (aired December 16)	Batista and Rey Mysterio	SmackDown!	
December 27 (aired December 30)	MNM (Joey Mercury and Johnny Nitro)	SmackDown!	

WWE Cruiserweight Championship
Incoming champion – Funaki
Date	Winner	Event/Show	Note(s)
February 20	Chavo Guerrero Jr.	No Way Out	Six-way Cruiserweight Open, also involving Paul London, Akio, Shannon Moore, and Spike Dudley.
March 29 (aired March 31)	Paul London	SmackDown!	Seven-man battle royal.
August 2	Nunzio	Velocity	
October 9	Juventud	No Mercy	
November 15	Nunzio	House show	
November 22 (aired November 25)	Juventud	SmackDown!	
December 18	Kid Kash	Armageddon	

== Births ==
- January 21 – Arisa Shinose
- January 26 – Honoka
- February 1 – Yuzuki
- August 3 – Van Vert Jack

== Debuts ==
- Uncertain debut date

- Ashley Massaro
- Epico Colón
- Fenix
- Killian Dain/Big Damo
- Paige
- Xavier Woods

- January - Tommaso Ciampa
- January 4 – Antonio Honda
- January 5 - Bobby Lashley
- March 5 - Jonathan Gresham
- March 6 – Ram Kaicho
- March 25 - Damian Priest
- March 31 - Akebono Tarō
- April 3 - Kamui
- April 16 - Drew Gulak
- April 19 - Rey Fenix
- May 1 – Aoi Kizuki
- May 15 – Violento Jack
- July 8 - Johnny Gargano
- July 14 - Gran Metalik
- July 15 - Brian Cage
- August 14 – Guanchulo
- September 20 – Dark Sheik
- September 23 - Tony Nese
- October 5 - Yūki Ōno
- October 30 - El Phantasmo
- November 4 – Serena
- November 6 - The Beast Mortos
- November 19 - Gunther (wrestler)
- December 3 – Takoyakida
- December 23 – Kankuro Hoshino
- December 25 - Akihiko Ito (Noah)

== Retirements ==
- Wendi Richter (1979–2005)
- Joy Giovanni (2004–2005)
- Metal Maniac (November 1991 – 2005)
- Ron Reis (1994-2005)
- Rochelle Loewen (2003-2005)
- Lauren Jones (2004-2005)
- Nathan Jones (11 October 1997 – 2005)
- Nidia (2001–2005)
- Tony Anthony (1980-2005)
- Psycho Sam Cody (1980-2005)
- Colonel DeBeers (1972-January 29, 2005)
- Amy Weber (November 18, 2004 – February 2005)
- Molly Holly (August 2, 1997 – April 14, 2005) (since then has made occasional appearances)
- Rico Constantino (1998 – July 2005) (although he had been fully inactive from in-ring competition since 2005, he briefly returned to have his full retirement match in 2012)
- Chris Jericho (October 2, 1990 – August 27, 2005) (He retired because he wanted to focus on his music career with his band Fozzy. He returned to wrestling in 2007)
- Muhammad Hassan (2002 – September 21, 2005, he returned for a match in 2018)

== Deaths ==
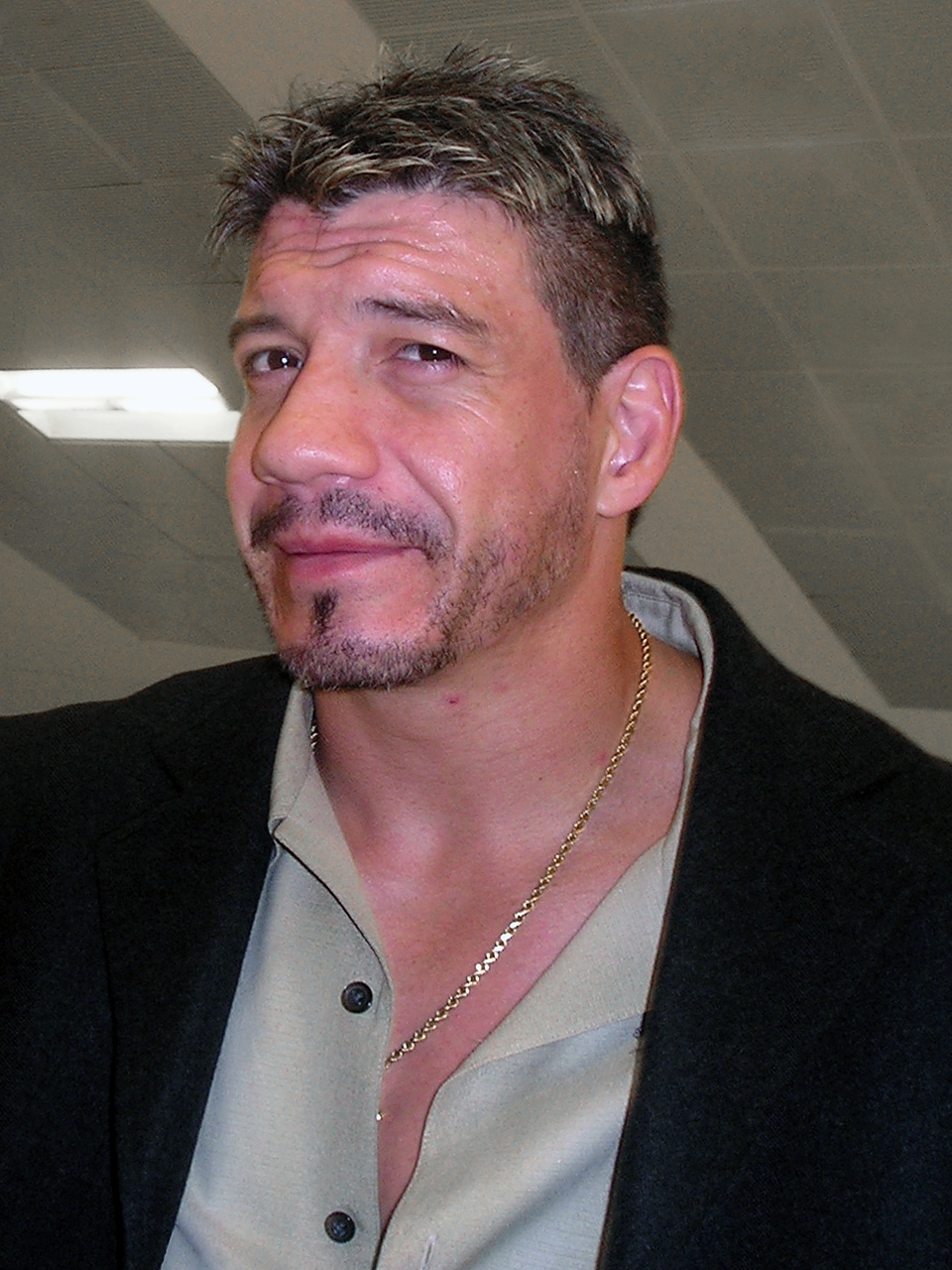
Eddie Guerrero

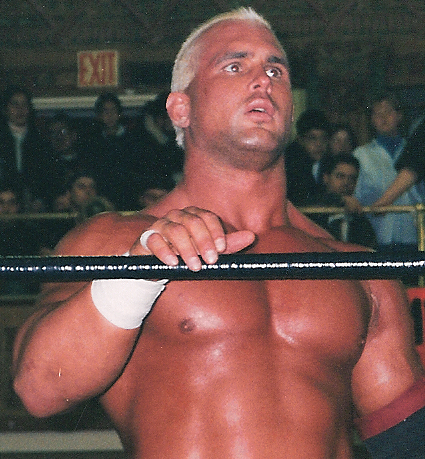
Chris Candido

- January 18 – Pez Whatley, 54
- January 20 - Tony Lanza, 84
- April 21 – Black Angus Campbell, 70
- April 28 – Chris Candido, 33
- May 12 – The Matador, 76
- May 28 – Daniel Quirk, 22
- July 11 – Shinya Hashimoto, 40
- July 16
  - Miguel Pérez (wrestler), 68
  - Rod Trongard, 72
- July 21 – Lord Alfred Hayes, 76
- August 8 – Dean Rockwell, 93
- August 13 – Chris Tolos, 75
- August 15 – Peter Smit, 43
- August 18 – Chri$ Ca$h, 23
- August 26 – Sailor White, 56
- September 9 – Tarzan Taborda, 70
- September 23 – Gene Stanlee, 88
- October 22 –
  - The Crusher, 79
  - Franky Gee, 43
- November 13 – Eddie Guerrero, 38

== See also ==
- List of TNA pay-per-view events
- List of WWE pay-per-view events
