= Wrestle-1 Grand Prix 2005 =

2005 professional wrestling tournament

- Promotion(s): Big Mouth; Fighting and Entertainment Group
- Date: August 4, 2005; October 2, 2005
- City: Tokyo, Japan
- Venue: Ryōgoku Kokugikan; Yoyogi National Stadium
- Attendance: Night 1: 10,500; Night 2: 8,012; Combined: 18,512
- Tagline: A Tournament to Determine the No. 1 in Professional Wrestling (Note: Japanese: プロレス界のNo.1を決めるトーナメント, Hepburn: Puroresu-kai no nanbā wan o kimeru tōnamento)

Wrestle-1 chronology
← Previous; Fantasy Fight Wrestle-1	Next → —

The Wrestle-1 Grand Prix 2005 was an incomplete professional wrestling tournament held over two events produced by Fumihiko Uwai's Big Mouth company in partnership with Fighting and Entertainment Group, the parent company of the K-1 kickboxing promotion. The opening round took place on August 4, 2005 at the Ryōgoku Kokugikan and the second round took place on October 2 at the Yoyogi National Stadium, both in Tokyo, Japan. Due to financial difficulties and numerous disagreements between the stakeholders, the joint venture closed without concluding the tournament.

In the main event of the opening round, The Great Muta defeated Akebono, who was making his wrestling debut in Japan, to qualify to the second round. In other prominent matches, Jun Akiyama defeated Katsuyori Shibata in the first round of the tournament, Kaz Hayashi defeated AJ Styles in a special singles match, and Mil Máscaras teamed with Terry Funk to defeat the team of Tomoaki Honma and Katsuhiko Nakajima in the opening match. The event also notably featured a ceremony in honor of Shinya Hashimoto, who died on July 11, 2005. In the main event of the second round, Bob Sapp defeated Jun Akiyama to qualify to the semi-finals. In other prominent matches, Mitsuharu Misawa and Yoshinari Ogawa defeated Akebono and Scorpio, Team 3D (Bubba Ray and D-Von) defeated Voodoo Murders (Johnny Stamboli and Chuck Palumbo), Giant Bernard and The Predator defeated Sam Greco and Jan "The Giant" Nortje, and Abdullah the Butcher and Giant Kimala defeated Dory Funk Jr. and Katsuhiko Nakajima.

== Background ==
Wrestle-1 had originally been a professional wrestling project backed by K-1 that fell through in 2003 amid the rivalry between K-1 and Pride Fighting Championships. In 2004, Fumihiko Uwai, a New Japan Pro-Wrestling (NJPW) executive and matchmaker, left the company after clashing with newly appointed president Seiichi Kusama. Sadaharu Tanikawa, head of K-1 promoter Fighting and Entertainment Group (FEG), with whom Uwai had grown close during NJPW's move toward mixed martial arts under Antonio Inoki, then asked him to produce a professional wrestling event. Uwai founded Big Mouth, a company funded by FEG, and recruited Akira Maeda as its supervisor. At a January 2005 press conference they pledged to "revive true Strong Style," and Wrestle-1 was announced for the end of March. Uwai secured the cooperation of All Japan Pro Wrestling (AJPW) and Pro Wrestling Noah and signed freelancers such as Katsuyori Shibata and Kazunari Murakami. However, FEG then enlisted Maeda as supervisor of its new MMA promotion Hero's, and the March date was postponed, as was a planned April show at Yokohama Arena. Uwai resigned as Hero's producer to pursue the event. FEG ultimately required that it be held as a tournament, in order to differentiate it from Dream Stage Entertainment's Hustle, and the event was finally scheduled for August 4, 2005 at Ryōgoku Kokugikan.

== Event ==
=== Opening Round ===
==== Preliminary matches ====
The opening contest featured Mil Máscaras teaming up with Terry Funk to take on Kensuke Office affiliates Tomoaki Honma and Katsuhiko Nakajima. In the end, while Funk kept Honma in a toe hold, Mil Máscaras hit a top rope crossbody on Nakajima for a pinfall victory.

Next, AJPW's Kaz Hayashi faced Total Nonstop Action Wrestling's AJ Styles in a special singles bout. In the end, Hayashi delivered the ""Final Cut" to pick up the victory.

The remaining six matches were all first round bouts of the Wrestle-1 Grand Prix 2005 tournament, starting with Ultimate Pro Wrestling's The Predator taking on AJPW rookie Kohei Suwama. In the end, Suwama dodged a big boot and countered with a backdrop suplex to get a pinfall victory.

Next up was Genichiro Tenryu against Big Mouth's Kazunari Murakami. Murakami made his entrance accompanied by the veteran Yoshiaki Fujiwara, carrying two beer bottles wrapped in tape. He began attacking Tenryu before the ring announcer had finished introducing the competitors. After Tenryu took control of the match, putting Murakami in a couple of submission holds and delivering kicks to his face while he was on the ground, Murakami grabbed one of the beer bottles and pushed the referee aside. He attacked Tenryu, who grabbed the second bottle. They clashed, sending glass shards towards Tenryu's face. When the referee tried to separate them, Murakami hit him with the sharp bottle neck that he was still holding, resulting in his immediate disqualification. Fujiwara then entered the ring and slapped Murakami in the face.

In the fifth match, Bob Sapp faced Giant Bernard who was accompanied by Taru and represented the Voodoo-Murders stable. In the closing moments, Taru distracted Sapp by hitting him with a metal pipe. Sapp grabbed Taru by the hair, but Bernard rescued his stablemate, holding Sapp from behind so that Taru could hit him again. Sapp avoided the shot, however, and Bernard got hit instead, allowing Sapp to perform a roll-up pinfall. After the match, a frustrated Bernard hit Taru with the "Bernard Bomb".

Next was a memorial ceremony for Shinya Hashimoto who had passed away from a sudden brain aneurysm on July 11, 2005. As part of the ceremony, Akira Maeda held up a portrait of the late wrestler for the duration of the ten-bell salute.

The sixth match saw Riki Choshu face Kensuke Sasaki, with both representing their own recently founded promotions, Riki Pro and Kensuke Office respectively. In the end, Sasaki hit Choshu with a flying lariat from the top rope, followed by a "Northern Lights Bomb" to win the match.

Next, Pro Wrestling Noah's Jun Akiyama faced Big Mouth's Katsuyori Shibata. The match started with Shibata hitting Akiyama with a backdrop suplex immediately followed by two stiff kicks to the face, busting Akiyama's forehead open. As a receipt, Akiyama brought the action to the outside where he unleashed a flurry of strikes and chair shots on Shibata. A hard fought bout ensued which ended with Akiyama performing the "Exploder '98" and pinning Shibata for the win.

==== Main event ====
The main event was former sumo wrestler, 64th yokozuna and kickboxer Akebono making his wrestling debut in Japan against The Great Muta. Muta controlled most of the bout and won the match after hitting a moonsault press from the top rope.

== Results ==
Opening Round (August 4)
No.	Results	Stipulations	Times
1	Mil Máscaras and Terry Funk defeated Tomoaki Honma and Katsuhiko Nakajima by pinfall	Tag team match	10:49
2	Kaz Hayashi defeated AJ Styles by pinfall	Singles match	14:38
3	Kohei Suwama defeated The Predator by pinfall	Wrestle-1 Grand Prix 2005 first round match	7:36
4	Genichiro Tenryu defeated Kazunari Murakami (with Yoshiaki Fujiwara) by disqualification	Wrestle-1 Grand Prix 2005 first round match	7:29
5	Bob Sapp defeated Giant Bernard (with Taru) by pinfall	Wrestle-1 Grand Prix 2005 first round match	5:30
6	Kensuke Sasaki defeated Riki Choshu by pinfall	Wrestle-1 Grand Prix 2005 first round match	6:10
7	Jun Akiyama defeated Katsuyori Shibata by pinfall	Wrestle-1 Grand Prix 2005 first round match	10:46
8	The Great Muta defeated Akebono by pinfall	Wrestle-1 Grand Prix 2005 first round match	10:08

Second Round (October 2)
No.	Results	Stipulations	Times
1	Abdullah the Butcher and Giant Kimala defeated Dory Funk Jr. and Katsuhiko Nakajima by pinfall	Tag team match	10:16
2	Giant Bernard and The Predator defeated Sam Greco and Jan "The Giant" Nortje by pinfall	Tag team match	12:20
3	Team 3D (Bubba Ray and D-Von) defeated Voodoo Murders (Johnny Stamboli and Chuck Palumbo) by pinfall	Tag team match	14:19
4	Minoru Suzuki defeated Kohei Suwama by technical knockout	Wrestle-1 Grand Prix 2005 second round match	17:00
5	Jamal (with Taka Michinoku) defeated Don Frye by pinfall	Wrestle-1 Grand Prix 2005 second round match	8:16
6	Mitsuharu Misawa and Yoshinari Ogawa defeated Akebono and Scorpio by pinfall	Tag team match	14:51
7	The Great Muta defeated Kensuke Sasaki by pinfall	Wrestle-1 Grand Prix 2005 second round match	13:34
8	Bob Sapp defeated Jun Akiyama by pinfall	Wrestle-1 Grand Prix 2005 second round match	7:22

=== Wrestle-1 Grand Prix 2005 bracket ===
Round 1 August 4
Genichiro Tenryu	DQ
Kazunari Murakami	7:29
Kohei Suwama	Pin
The Predator	7:36
The Great Muta	Pin
Akebono	10:08
Riki Choshu	6:10
Kensuke Sasaki	Pin
Bob Sapp	Pin
Giant Bernard	5:30
Jun Akiyama	Pin
Katsuyori Shibata	10:46

Round 2 October 2
Jamal	Pin
Don Frye	8:16
Minoru Suzuki (Note: Suzuki replaced Genichiro Tenryu.)	TKO
Kohei Suwama	17:00
The Great Muta	Pin
Kensuke Sasaki	13:34
Bob Sapp	Pin
Jun Akiyama	7:22

== See also ==
- 2005 in professional wrestling
