= Death Before Dishonor IV =

2006 Ring of Honor event

- Promotion: Ring of Honor
- Date: July 15, 2006
- City: Philadelphia, Pennsylvania
- Venue: Pennsylvania National Guard Armory
- Attendance: 1,100

Pay-per-view chronology
← Previous; The 100th Show	Next → Unified

Death Before Dishonor chronology
← Previous; 2005	Next → 2007

Death Before Dishonor IV is a major professional wrestling event produced by Ring of Honor (ROH). It took place on July 15, 2006 from the Pennsylvania National Guard Armory in Philadelphia, Pennsylvania.

This was the fourth annual event in the Death Before Dishonor chronology, with the first taking place in 2003.

== Production ==
=== Storylines ===
Other on-screen personnel
Role	Name
Commentators	Dave Prazak
Commentators	Jared David

Death Before Dishonor IV featured seven different professional wrestling matches that involved different wrestlers from pre-existing scripted feuds and storylines. Wrestlers were portrayed as either villains or heroes in the scripted events that built tension and culminated in a wrestling match involving.

The shows main event is Team ROH (Ace Steel, Adam Pearce, BJ Whitmer, Bryan Danielson, Homicide & Samoa Joe) (with JJ Dillon) vs. Team CZW (Chris Hero, Claudio Castagnoli, Eddie Kingston, Nate Webb & Necro Butcher) in 12-Man Cage of Death match.

=== Background ===
It was also the fourth Death Before Dishonor event in Ring of Honor history.

== Results ==
No.	Results	Stipulations	Times
1	Delirious defeated Seth Delay	Singles match	4:48
2	The Embassy (Jimmy Rave & Sal Rinauro) (with Prince Nana) defeated Colt Cabana & Jay Lethal	Tag team match	11:38
3	Nigel McGuinness (c) defeated Roderick Strong via Countout	Singles match for the ROH Pure Championship	15:45
4	The Briscoes (Jay Briscoe & Mark Briscoe) defeated Irish Airborne (Dave Crist & Jake Crist)	Tag team match	15:09
5	AJ Styles defeated Davey Richards	Singles match	17:03
6	Bryan Danielson (c) defeated Sonjay Dutt by referee's decision	Singles match for the ROH World Championship	18:48
7	Team ROH (Ace Steel, Adam Pearce, BJ Whitmer, Bryan Danielson, Homicide & Samoa Joe) (with JJ Dillon) defeated Team CZW (Chris Hero, Claudio Castagnoli, Eddie Kingston, Nate Webb & Necro Butcher)	12-Man Cage of Death match	40:38
(c) / – the champion(s) heading into the match

== See also ==
- List of Ring of Honor special events
- List of Ring of Honor pay-per-view events
