= Alex Payne =

British television presenter

- Born: June 1980 (age 46)
- Education: Sandroyd School, Eton College and Edinburgh University
- Occupations: Sports and television presenter

Alex Payne (born June 1980 ) is a British sports presenter.

== Early life and education ==
Payne attended Sandroyd School, Eton College and Edinburgh University.

== Career ==
Until 2018 he spent much of his career presenting live coverage of rugby union on Sky Sports, where he also hosted the Rugby Club. Payne was one of the youngest presenters on the channel when he started, and became the lead presenter of their coverage of English and European Rugby, and hosted coverage of England's Internationals.

He now hosts the podcast The Good, The Bad & The Rugby, which debuted at no.1 in the Apple charts before releasing its first episode.

== Personal life ==
Payne is married with two children, the elder of which was born prematurely at 29 weeks into pregnancy.

== Bibliography ==
- Payne, Alex; Haskell, James; Tindall, Mike (2024). The Good, the Bad & the Rugby – Unleashed. HarperCollins UK. ISBN 9780008712709.
