= Daizee Haze =

American professional wrestler

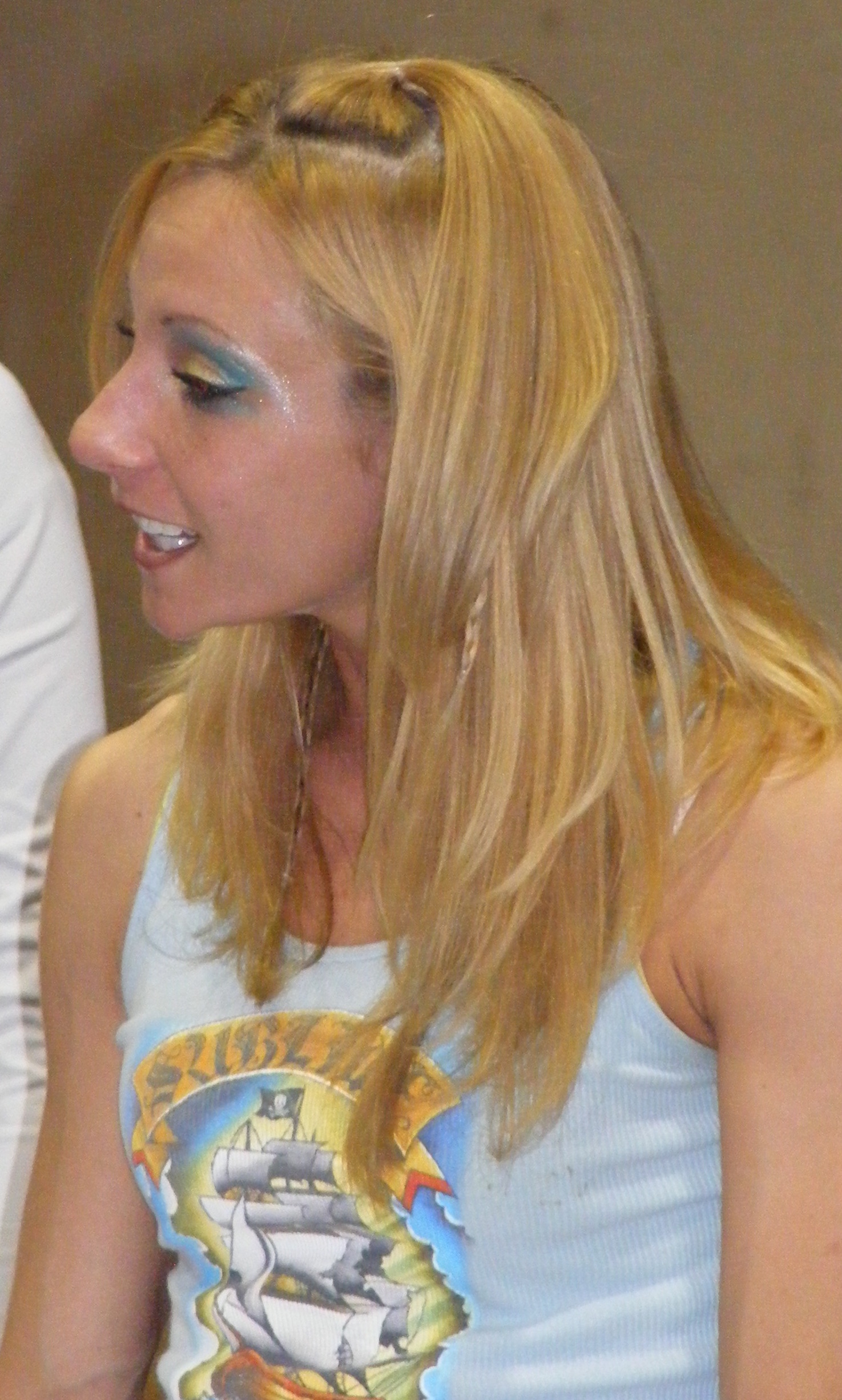
- Haze in 2009

Personal information
- Born: Emily Sharp; May 11, 1983 (age 43) Cape Girardeau, Missouri, U.S.

Professional wrestling career
- Ring name(s): Daizee Haze; Marley; Marley Sebastian; Shelirious
- Billed height: 5 ft 3 in (1.60 m)
- Billed weight: 115 lb (52 kg)
- Billed from: Forest Park, Illinois; San Francisco, California
- Trained by: Delirious; Kid Kash
- Debut: March 29, 2002
- Retired: October 1, 2011

Emily Sharp (born May 11, 1983) is an American former professional wrestler known under the ring name Daizee Haze. She is best known for her time on the independent circuit, where she performed for numerous promotions such as Chikara, Ring of Honor and Shimmer Women Athletes, where she was a one-time Shimmer Tag Team Champion.

== Professional wrestling career ==
=== Debut and Gateway Championship Wrestling (2002) ===
Sharp was trained by Kid Kash and Delirious. She honors her mentors, especially Delirious, in the ring by imitating some of their mannerisms, particularly Delirious' incoherent speech and performing some of their trademark wrestling moves. In March 2002 she made her professional debut for Gateway Championship Wrestling based out of Missouri using a hippie stoner gimmick. The gimmick is a tribute to her father, who was a hippie, and died when she was fifteen, and the ring name Daizee Haze is the product of her sister's imagination, after she wanted to change her name legally to Daisy Hayes after Savage Garden singer Darren Hayes. Around the same time MsChif began working for the same promotion and the two began to work together inside the ring. Haze also began working for IWA Mid-South as the valet of Matt Sydal, and then went on to compete in the women's division.

=== Independent Wrestling Association Mid-South (2003–2008) ===
Haze made her IWA Mid-South debut in 2003, as the manager of Matt Sydal, but was soon wrestling in the newly created women's division. Her first match was against Mickie Knuckles at the Revenge Served Cold event on October 23. In May 2004 the NWA Midwest Women's Championship was introduced, and a tournament was set up at the Volcano Girls show to determine the inaugural champion. Haze defeated Sumie Sakai in the first round and Rain in the second, but lost in a three-way final, when Lacey beat her and Mercedes Martinez.

The NWA Midwest Women's Championship and IWA Mid-South Women's Championship were merged early in 2005, and Haze won the Championship from Ariel in a six-pack challenge at the Givin Em Da Bizness event on February 12, 2005. After three months, however, Haze dropped the championship to MsChif on May 7. Haze continued making sporadic appearances in IWA Mid-South, at one point donning Delirious style attire and dubbing herself Shelirious in a match against Mickie Knuckles on July 9, 2005. On May 2, 2008, Haze captured the Championship for a second time after defeating the defending champion Knuckles and Sara Del Rey in a three-way match. Haze competed in the Volcano Girls 2 tournament but was eliminated in the semi-finals by Knuckles. The winner of the tournament, Rachel Summerlyn, earned a title shot against Haze at King of the Deathmatches. Summerlyn did not get her championship match, however, and at the end of 2008 the championship was deactivated.

=== Ring of Honor (2004–2011) ===
Around the same time as her debut in IWA Mid-South, Haze and Sydal debuted in Ring of Honor (ROH) in early 2004. At the time women's wrestling was not common practice for the promotion, but Haze engaged in an in-ring program with Allison Danger, who was spending time away from The Prophecy. Soon after Haze became a member of Generation Next when Sydal joined the faction. In November 2005 at ROH's Vendetta show she managed Generation Next and A.J. Styles (who replaced Roderick Strong) in an eight-man war against The Embassy. Haze was joined by Jade Chung who had broken free of the mental abuse at the hands of The Embassy since becoming the kayfabe girlfriend of Strong. During the eight-man war Prince Nana, of The Embassy, dragged Haze into the ring by her hair. Austin Aries and Sydal made the save only to have Haze turn on them as she low-blowed both men and proceeded to deliver a Mind Trip to Jade Chung before siding with Prince Nana. She remained with the stable until it was disbanded in September 2006, after which she turned into a fan favorite and aligned herself with B. J. Whitmer and Colt Cabana in their war with Lacey, Jimmy Jacobs and Brent Albright.

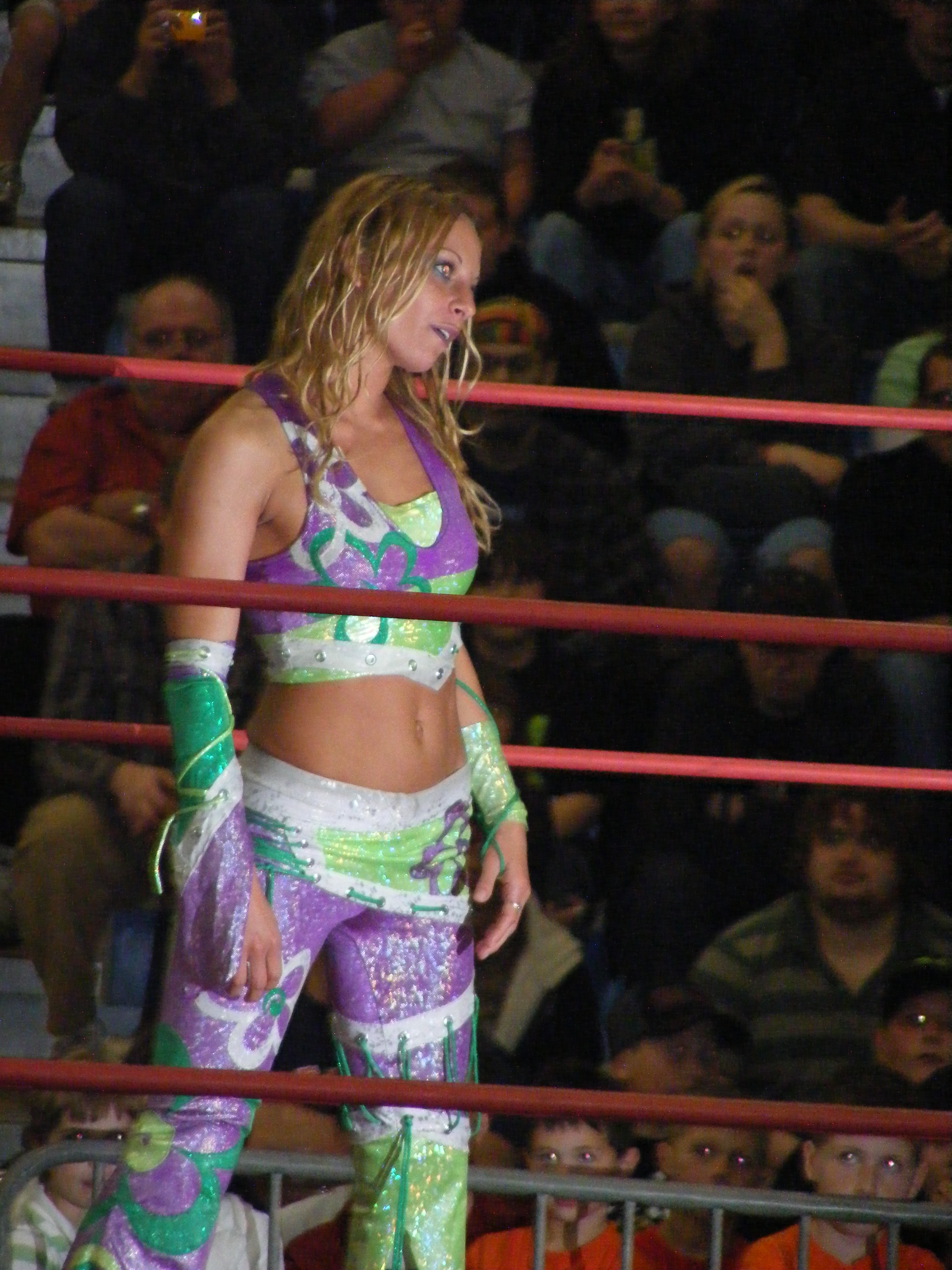
Haze in the ring in 2008

Outside of the promotion Haze had an ongoing rivalry with Lacey which was carried over into Ring of Honor. At the Dedicated show in January 2007, Haze teamed with Whitmer and Cabana in six-person tag match against Lacey, Jacobs and Albright. Jacobs, Lacey and Albright won the match after Jacobs put Haze through a table. The feud continued on over the course of Ring of Honor's Fifth Year Festival. In a re-match from the Dedicated show, except with Adam Pearce replacing Albright, Haze and her team won a street fight. Six days later, however, Haze was beaten in a singles match by Lacey, after Jacobs interfered.

In the summer of 2007 Haze began feuding with Sara Del Rey who was the reigning Shimmer Champion. The two fought on many occasions, typically with the Championship not on the line. Haze's first Championship match came in 2008 at the Ring of Honor's 6th Anniversary Show, where Del Rey retained the championship. The feud with Del Rey expanded to include Sweet and Sour, Inc, the faction of which Del Rey was a member, and as a result, Delirious came to aid Haze. Haze's rivalry with Lacey, who had become part of The Age of the Fall, reignited. Delirious began revealing romantic intentions towards Haze, but she rejected him, prompting Rhett Titus to claim that he had slept with Haze, who denied it. After seeing footage of Haze and Tius together, however, Delirious joined The Age of the Fall, although he left shortly afterwards when Jacobs attempted to spike Haze, but Delirious turned on his stablemates and saved Haze.

In 2009, ROH signed a television deal with HDNet for a weekly episodic wrestling show Ring of Honor Wrestling, beginning on March 21, 2009. Haze wrestled on the second show, which aired on March 28, where she lost to Del Rey after a Royal Butterfly. On the fourth show, which aired on April 11, she teamed up with Nevaeh to defeat Del Rey and Sassy Stephie. On the 8th episode of ROH on HDNet, which aired on May 9, Daizee Haze teamed with Delirious to take on the Shimmer Champion MsChif and her tag team partner Jimmy Jacobs in a match where Haze pinned the Shimmer Champion with a Mind Trip. As part of the 11th episode, which aired on May 30, she took part in a 3-way match against the former SHIMMER Champion Sara Del Rey and the current Shimmer Champion MsChif. This match was eventually won by MsChif who pinned Haze with the Desecrator. She came back in the 17th episode, which aired on July 11, in which she teamed once again with Nevaeh losing to the team of MsChif and Sara Del Rey. Since 2009, she is one of the two head trainers of the ROH Wrestling Academy, the other head trainer being Delirious. She has not made an appearance for ROH since April 2, 2011.

=== Chikara (2005–2011) ===
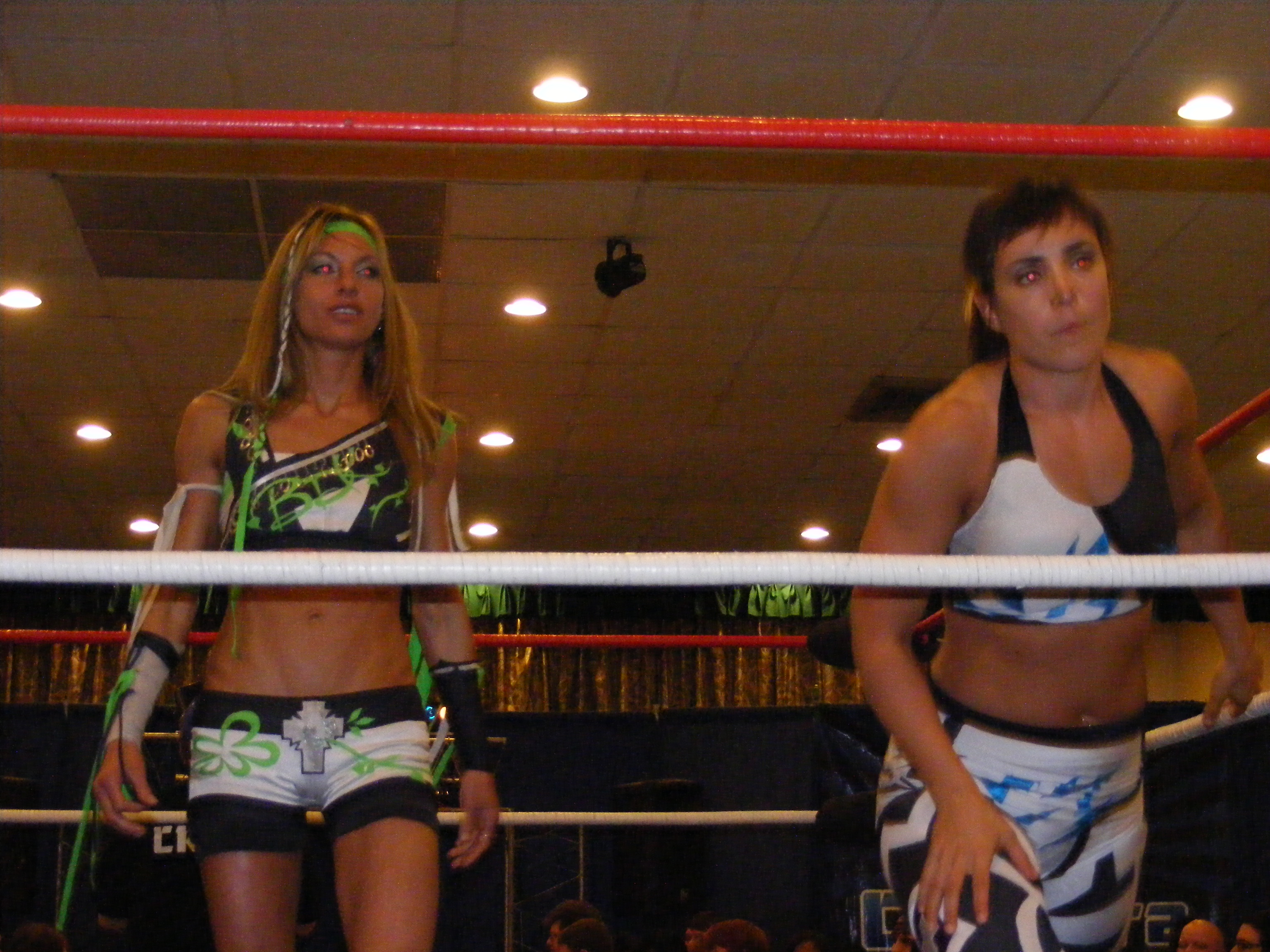
Haze (left) and Sara Del Rey in October 2010

Haze began wrestling for the Philadelphia–based Chikara in 2005. In November 2009 she was placed in her first major storyline in the company, when she aligned herself with Claudio Castagnoli, Ares, Pinkie Sanchez, Sara Del Rey, Tim Donst and Tursas to form the heel stable Bruderschaft des Kreuzes (BDK). The stable has since been joined by Lince Dorado and Delirious. While in BDK Haze began regularly teaming with Del Rey and together the two of them picked up victories over tag teams such as The Osirian Portal (Amasis and Ophidian), Los Ice Creams (El Hijo del Ice Cream and Ice Cream, Jr.), The Throwbacks (Dasher Hatfield and Sugar Dunkerton), Amazing Kong and Raisha Saeed, and Mike Quackenbush and Jigsaw. On September 18, 2010, Haze wrestled Japanese joshi legend Manami Toyota in her first match on American soil, in a losing effort. On October 23 Haze represented BDK in the torneo cibernetico match, where they faced a team composed of Chikara originals. She was eliminated from the match by Eddie Kingston. The following day Haze and Del Rey defeated the Super Smash Bros. (Player Uno and Player Dos) in a tag team match to pick up their third straight victory and, as the first all–female tag team, earn the right to challenge for the Chikara Campeonatos de Parejas (tag team championship), at the time held by their stablemates Ares and Claudio Castagnoli. However, Haze and Del Rey never got to cash in their points as Ares and Castagnoli ordered them to defend them in a four–way elimination match on November 21, where they ended up being eliminated by Mike Quackenbush and Jigsaw and losing all of their points. On July 31, 2011, Castagnoli turned first on Del Rey, after losing to her in a singles match, and then Haze, as she was standing up for her regular tag team partner. The following week, Del Rey quit BDK, while Chikara announced that Haze would be taking a leave of absence from the promotion after suffering a storyline injury at the hands of Castagnoli.

=== Shimmer Women Athletes (2005–2011) ===
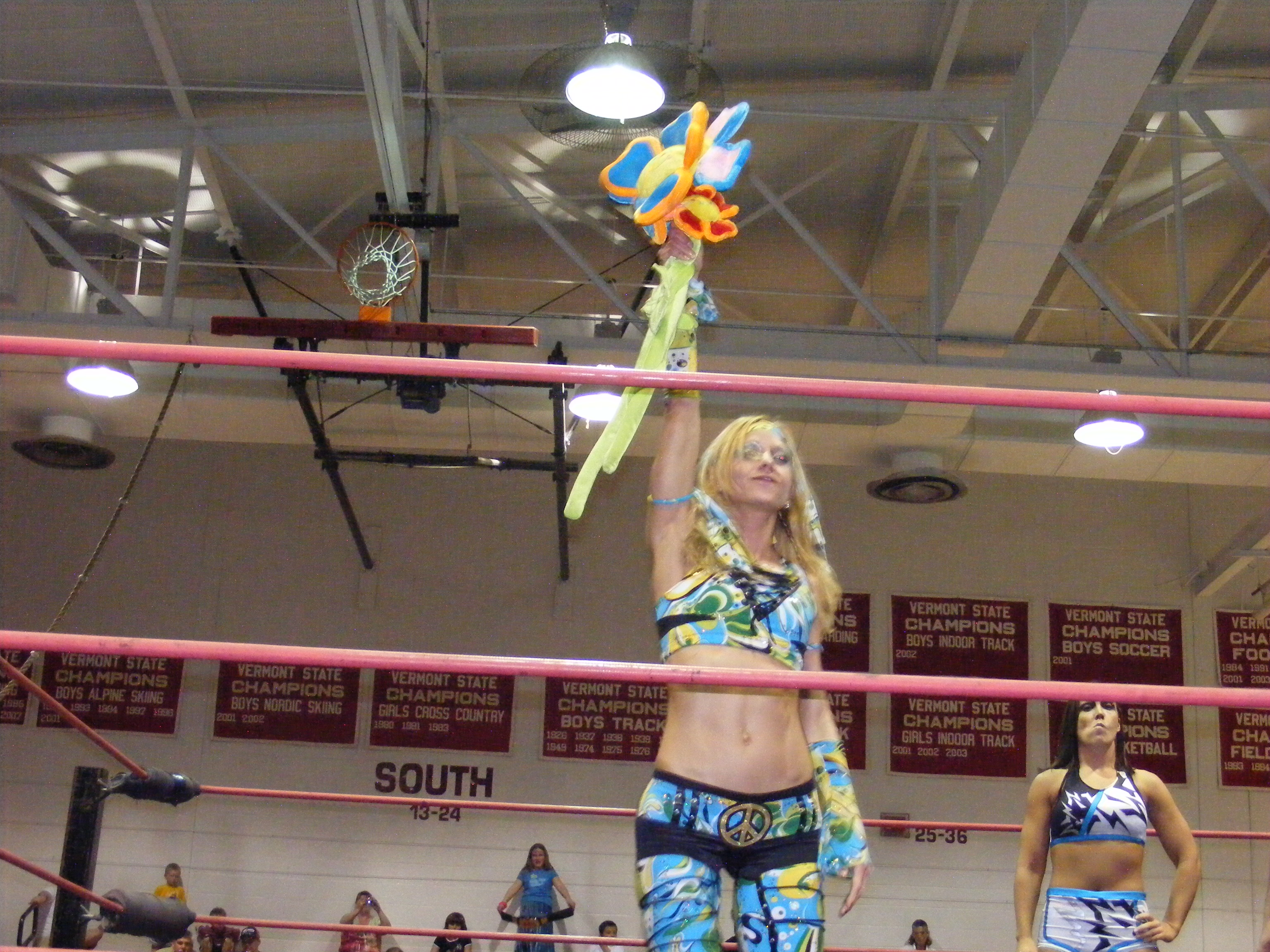
Haze with her signature plastic daisy

Daizee also wrestles regularly in ROH's sister promotion, Shimmer Women Athletes, an all-female wrestling promotion based out of Chicago. Haze was in the main event of their first four shows, which are released on DVD as "volumes". At the Volume 1 taping on November 5, 2005, Haze defeated Lacey with the Mind Trip in a twenty-five-minute match. On Volume 2, Del Rey pinned Haze with the Royal Butterfly to win a four-way elimination main event which also involved Lacey and Mercedes Martinez. Haze lost to Del Rey again on Volume 3, and on Volume 4 Haze defeated Rebecca Knox.

Haze's first real feud in Shimmer was against Knox, who was angry after her loss on Volume 4, leading to a two out of three falls match being booked for Volume 5, which Haze ended up losing, two falls to one. On Volume 6, however, Haze gained a victory over Nikita. Haze and Knox were set to end their feud in a 60-minute Ironwoman match on Volume 7 on October 22, 2006, but the idea was scrapped after Knox suffered an injury while wrestling in Europe.

Instead, Haze faced Cheerleader Melissa in the main event where Melissa came out victorious. On Volume 8 Haze regained some momentum when she defeated Tiana Ringer, and on Volume 9 she continued her winning streak by pinning Amber O'Neal, although she lost to Awesome Kong at the Volume 10 tapings.

A two-day tournament, taped June 1 and 2, 2007, was held to crown the first Shimmer Champion over the course of Volumes 11 and 12. Haze made it to semi-finals, defeating Portia Perez and Malia Hosaka en route, but lost to Lacey. Volume 13 was also taped which allowed Haze to have her first match against Sarah Stock, which Haze ultimately lost. On Volume 14, Haze and MsChif had their first match against each other for Shimmer (though the two had wrestled in a "bonus Shimmer attraction match" before in AAW) which Haze was able to win. Haze wrestled Stock in a number one contender's match on Volume 15, but lost after she was pinned with a Victory roll. On the last Volume of 2007, Volume 16, taped on October 15, Haze joined forces with MsChif and Eden Black to face The International Home Wrecking Crew, consisting of Jetta, Lacey and Rain. Haze pinned Jetta to pick up the win for her team.

Haze defeated Cindy Rogers on Volume 17 and Jetta on Volume 18 respectively, both taped on April 26, 2008. Due to a back injury, Haze did not compete on Volumes 19 or 20, although she was interviewed by Rebecca Bayless on Volume 19.

On September 8, 2008, Haze was named as the trainer of Shimmer wrestling school's first training course which started on October 27, 2008. Haze made her return to in-ring action at the October 19, 2008 tapings of Volume 21 where she was defeated by the Shimmer champion MsChif in a title match. On Volume 22, taped that same night, she defeated Miss Natural.

On May 2, 2009, at the tapings of Volume 23 she fought Nicole Matthews to a 20-minute time limit draw, the second ever after the one between Mercedes Martinez and Sara Del Rey as part of Volume 1. On Volume 24, taped that same night, Haze defeated Matthews in a "no time limit" rematch with the Mind Trip. The following night on Volume 25 Haze teamed with Allison Danger to defeat Matthews and Portia Perez in a tag team match and on Volume 26 she defeated her student and the first graduate of the Shimmer Wrestling School Rayna Von Tash in a singles match.

On November 8, 2009, at the tapings of Volumes 27 and 28 Haze, due to an injury, assumed the role of a referee for matches between Cat Power and Ariel, Amazing Kong and LuFisto and Nicole Matthews and Allison Danger.

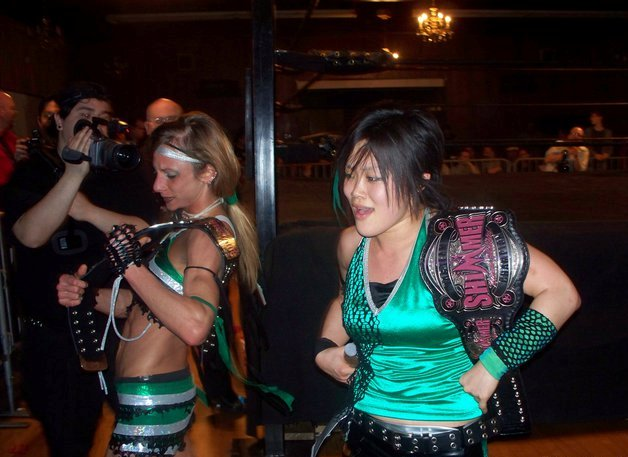
Haze (left) and Tomoka Nakagawa after winning the Shimmer Tag Team Championship

Haze returned to a wrestling role on April 10 at the tapings of Volumes 29 and 30. On Volume 29 she was defeated by Misaki Ohata and afterwards turned heel and attacked her. On Volume 30 Haze and Tomoka Nakagawa defeated Ohata and Jamilia Craft, another one of Haze's students from the Shimmer Wrestling School, in a tag team match. The following day at the tapings of Volumes 31 and 32, Haze lost to Ayako Hamada and defeated Ayumi Kurihara via countout in singles matches. On September 11, 2010, at the tapings of Volume 33 Haze was defeated by Kurihara in a rematch. Later that day in a match taped for Volume 34, Haze suffered an upset loss against Tenille. The following day Haze re–formed her team with Tomoka Nakagawa, when the two of them defeated Pretty Bitchin' (Nikki Roxx and Ariel) in a match taped for Volume 35. On Volume 36 Haze took part in an eight-woman elimination tag team match, where she, Nakagawa, Sara Del Rey and Madison Eagles were defeated by Ayako Hamada, Ayumi Kurihara, Cheerleader Melissa and Serena Deeb. On March 26, 2011, Haze was defeated by Serena Deeb on Volume 37 and defeated Courtney Rush as part of the tapings of Volume 38, before reaffirming her partnership with Tomoka Nakagawa by pointing out that they were undefeated in tag team matches. The following day, at the tapings of Volume 40, Haze and Nakagawa defeated the Seven Star Sisters (Hiroyo Matsumoto and Misaki Ohata) to win the Shimmer Tag Team Championship. Haze and Nakagawa lost the title to Ayako Hamada and Ayumi Kurihara on October 1 at Volume 41. After the loss, Haze announced that she was quitting the promotion. On October 11, 2015, Haze made a one-night return to wrestling during Shimmer's tenth anniversary weekend, when she took part in Portia Perez's retirement match, where she, Kellie Skater, Lexie Fyfe and Madison Eagles defeated Perez, Kimber Lee, Lacey and Nicole Matthews.

=== Other promotions (2003–2011) ===
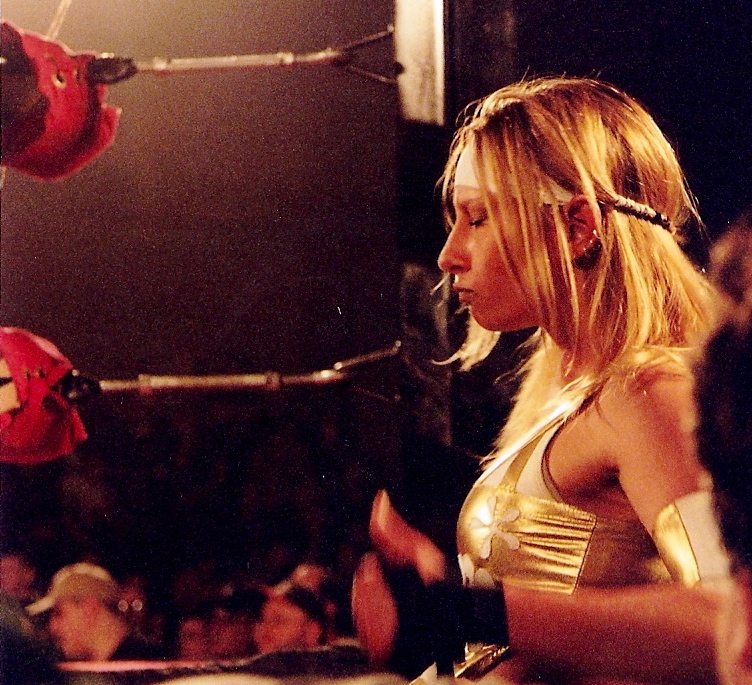
Haze at an ROH event in 2006

When Total Nonstop Action Wrestling (TNA) appeared on weekly pay-per-view Haze was booked to make several appearances. Her first came on February 22, 2003, for syndicated television show Xplosion where she wrestled MsChif. Haze continued making appearances as the valet and occasional tag team partner of Matt Sydal. On the July 2, 2003 episode of Xplosion, Haze and Sydal were defeated in a mixed tag team match by Julio Dinero and Alexis Laree, and on the February 4, 2004, episode Haze was defeated by Trinity in a singles match. She also lost a match to Nurse Veronica, which saw Veronica humiliate Haze by diapering her after securing the victory.

Haze participated in two ChickFight tournaments. Her first came in September 2006 at ChickFight VI in 2006 in which Haze faced the defending champion Cheerleader Melissa in the first round. The two wrestled to a thirty-five-minute draw, which mean that they both advanced to the second round, where they had a three-way match, also involving Allison Danger. Haze won the match, and then defeated KAORU in the finals to win the ChickFight VI tournament. The following year, Haze was in the tournament again, and defeated Skye in the first round, before losing to Eden Black in the semi-finals.

On the May 1, 2008, episode of TNA Impact! Haze made her return to TNA, using the alternate spelling of "Daisy Haze", in a losing effort to Cheerleader Melissa. Haze was also interviewed by Jeremy Borash on the May 1, 2008 edition of TNA Today.

In early 2009 Haze, under the ring name Marley Sebastian, took part in the tapings of the new all women wrestling show Wrestlicious, which premiered on MavTV and BiteTV on March 1, 2010. Her ring name was shortened to just Marley upon her debut on the fourth episode on March 24, in which she was defeated by Sierra Sheraton.

On June 21, 2009, Haze defeated Portia Perez, Jessica James and Sara Del Rey to win Anarchy Championship Wrestling's first annual American Joshi Queen of Queens tournament.

Haze appeared on Dragon Gate USA's first pay-per-view Enter the Dragon, which was taped on July 25, 2009, and aired on September 4, accompanying BxB Hulk to the ring.

=== Retirement ===
Following her loss of the Shimmer Tag Team Championship on October 1, 2011, Haze retired from professional wrestling. On November 29, 2012, Haze made a one-night return as she accompanied MsChif for her match against Sean Vincent at a Dynamo Pro Wrestling event.

== Personal life ==
Sharp studied Exercise Science in college. She also designs and sews wrestling apparel.

== Championships and accomplishments ==
- All Pro Wrestling
  - APW Future Legend Championship (1 time)
  - American Joshi Queen of Queens (2009)
- ChickFight
  - ChickFight VI
- Independent Wrestling Association Mid-South
  - IWA Mid-South Women's Championship (2 times)
- NWA Midwest
  - NWA Midwest Women's Championship (2 times)
- Pro Wrestling Illustrated
  - Ranked No. 15 of the top 50 female wrestlers in the PWI Female 50 in 2008
- Shimmer Women Athletes
  - Shimmer Tag Team Championship (1 time) – with Tomoka Nakagawa
