= Ricky Reyes =

Professional wrestler

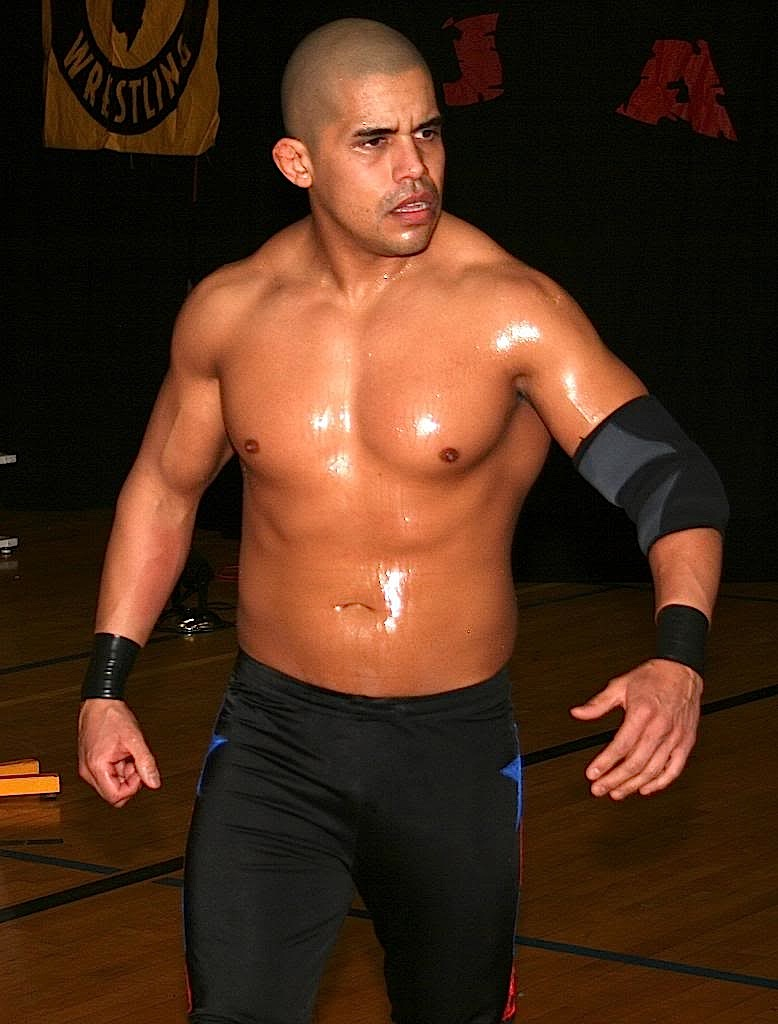
- Reyes at JAPW in 2012

Personal information
- Born: Richard Diaz; August 21, 1978 (age 48) San Bernardino, California, U.S.

Professional wrestling career
- Ring name(s): Brian Edwards; Cortez Castro; Ricky Reyes; Veneno; Monster Soldier 001; Monster Soldier 002
- Billed height: 5 ft 9 in (1.75 m)
- Billed weight: 192 lb (87 kg)
- Billed from: Havana, Cuba; The Streets (LU)
- Trained by: Antonio Inoki; Kevin Quinn; Shinya Makabe; Negro Casas
- Debut: 1997
- Retired: March 17, 2023

Reyes Nunez (born August 21, 1978), better known by the ring name Ricky Reyes, is a Cuban-American retired professional wrestler. He is known for his appearances in Ring of Honor, Pro Wrestling Guerrilla, World Wrestling Council, Lucha Underground and various other independent promotions.

== Professional wrestling career ==
=== Ring of Honor (2002–2006) ===
Reyes is one half of the Havana Pitbulls with Rocky Romero. At Ring of Honor (ROH)'s Reborn: Stage One, the Havana Pitbulls made their ROH debut against then tag champions The Briscoe Brothers in a non title match, which they lost. They later joined Homicide's alliance, The Rottweilers. The group also featured Julius Smokes, who would manage Reyes along with the rest of the members.

Reyes and Romero wrestled for the ROH Tag Team Championship at Testing The Limit against the champions CM Punk and Colt Cabana. They won the match and became the new champions. They eventually lost the title to Maff and Whitmer.

Reyes took part in the Trios Tournament in 2005 with partners Romero and Homicide. They won the tournament defeating Generation Next in the final match. The three winners of this tournament got to choose any match they wanted. While Homicide and Romero went after the World Title, Reyes wanted a tag title shot against Tony Mamaluke and Sal Rinauro. He picked Homicide as his partner, but they did not win.

In late 2005, Reyes began fighting students from the ROH Wrestling School. They were no challenge for him, and he defeated them all quickly. He claimed that no one could escape his Dragon Sleeper. These actions angered then head trainer Austin Aries of Generation Next.

At Hell Freezes Over, Austin Aries of Generation Next challenged Reyes to a match. After Aries pinned Reyes, Reyes would not release a sleeper hold and Roderick Strong, a fellow Generation Next member, came out to break things up. A return match was held at Best in the World. The feud came to an end at the 100th Show when Aries and Strong defeated Reyes and Homicide to retain the tag title.

=== HUSTLE (2004-2005) ===
On December 23, 2004, Reyes wrestled his first match for Japanese wrestling promotion HUSTLE at night one of that year's HUSTLE Christmas Special. Reyes adopted by masked persona of Monster Solider 002 and participated in a six-man tag team match. The next night on the second half of the HUSTLE Christmas Special, Reyes again appeared as Monster Solider 002 in a six-on-five handicap match. After several months away, Reyes returned to HUSTLE on March 18, 2005's HUSTLE 8 show where he changed ring names and became Monster Solider 001, where he was in a five-on-four handicap match.

=== Combat Zone Wrestling (2006) ===
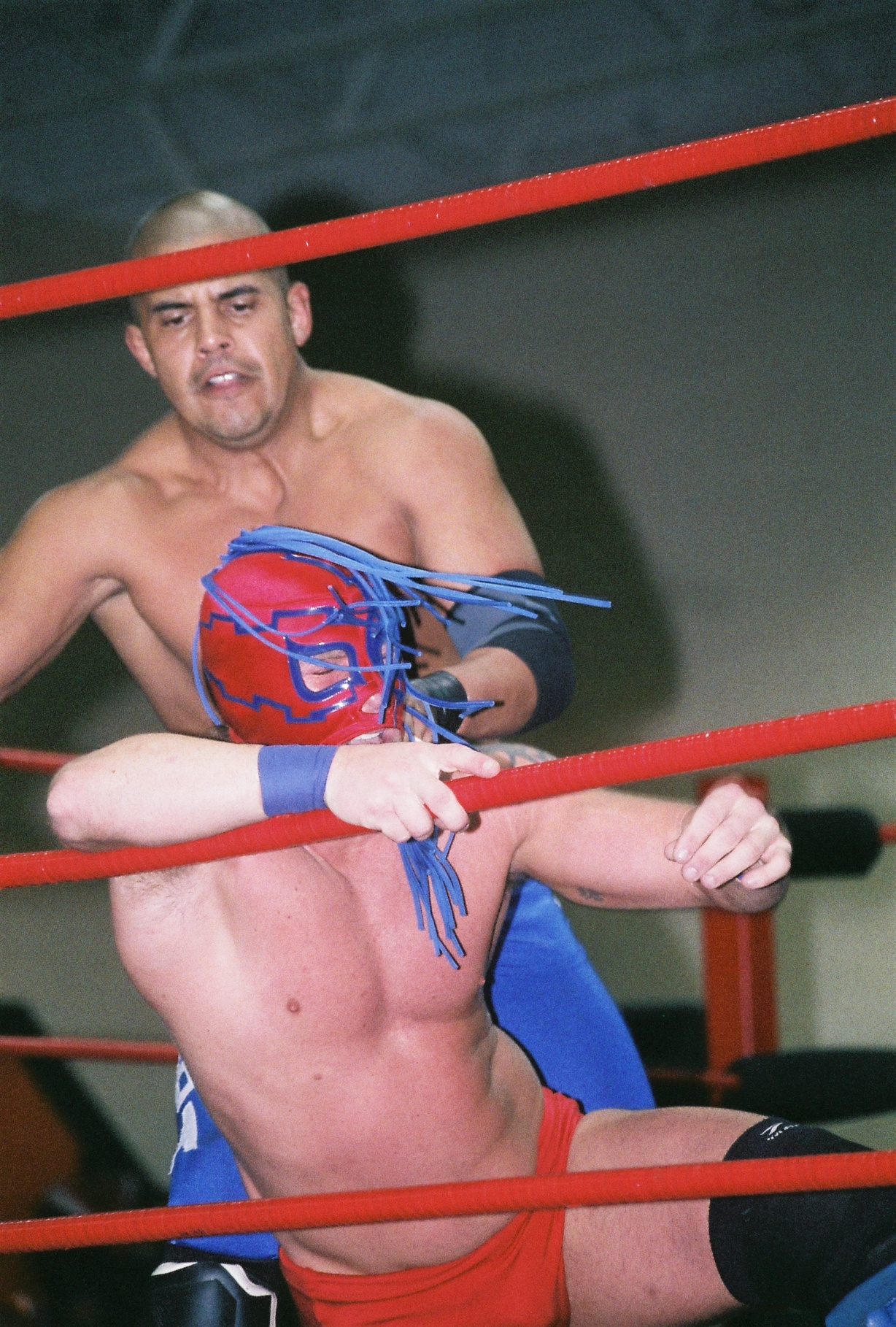
Reyes wrestling against Super Hentai.

On September 9, 2006, Reyes debuted in Combat Zone Wrestling (CZW) and joined The Blackout by helping Eddie Kingston win the CZW World Heavyweight Championship. Reyes left CZW on October 21, 2006 to join Pro Wrestling Unplugged, teaming with Joker at the Pitbull/Public Enemy Tag Team Memorial Cup.

=== World Wrestling Council (2007–2013) ===
He won the WWC World Junior Heavyweight Championship winning an X match against Hiram Tua, Tommy Diablo, Carlitos, Johnny Styles and Angel. He lost the title to Angel on April 18, 2009.

=== Victory Pro Wrestling (2005-2017) ===
Reyes has been competing in New York's Victory Pro Wrestling based out of Long Island, New York. Reyes has been the head training in the promotion and has faced some of Pro Wrestling's finest such as A.J. Styles, and Chris Hero, as well as becoming a grand slam Champion.

He led the group Confluxx, who’s members included EJ Risk, Jay Delta, and Xander Page

=== WWE (2012) ===
On the May 25, 2012 episode of WWE SmackDown, Reyes competed in a handicapped match along with Kevin Bendl on the losing end of a two-man team versus Ryback. Reyes competed under the name Brian Edwards.

=== Lucha Underground (2014–2019) ===
In September 2014, it was reported that Diaz had signed with El Rey network's new show Lucha Underground, that began airing on October 29. He worked the tapings under the ring name Cortez Castro. In Season 2 it was revealed that Castro is an Undercover Los Angeles Police Officer named Reyes, he is also part of a special task force along with Joey Ryan, both on a mission to bring down Dario Cueto. However, Ryan betrayed him and revealed his identity. Castro returned to the Temple as the masked wrestler Veneno, but was discovered by Ryan. On Episode 34, season 03, Castro defeated Joey Ryan to win an Aztec Medallion. On episode 5 of season 04, Castro was killed by Matanza (Jeff Cobb) in a Sacrifice to the Gods match.

== Championships and accomplishments ==
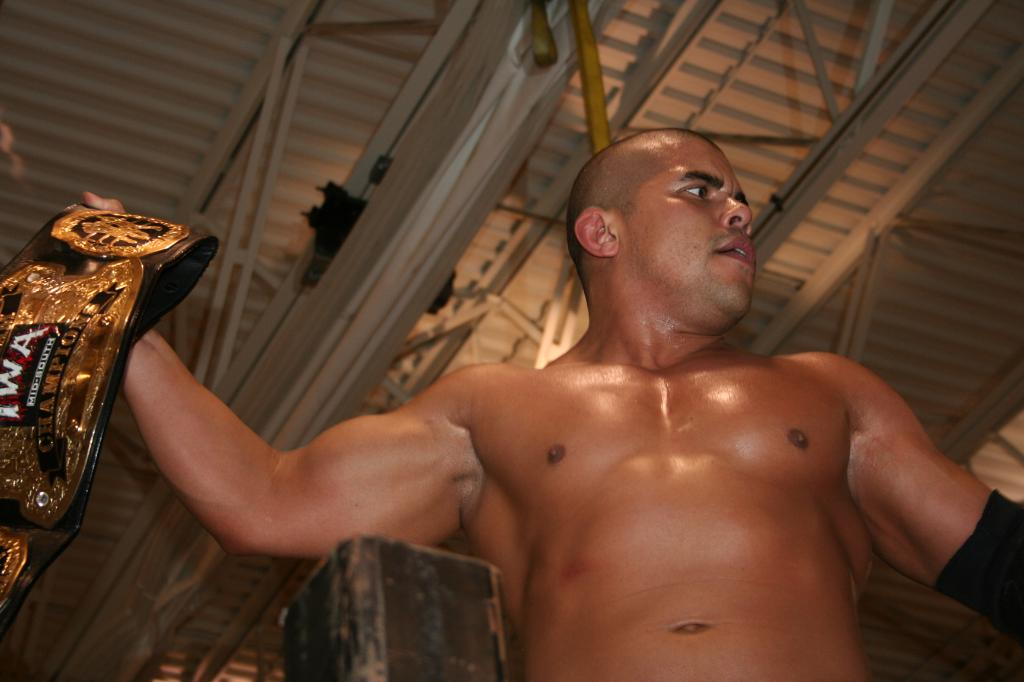
Reyes as IWA Mid-South Tag Team Champion

- 302 Professional Wrestling
  - 302 Cruiserweight Championship (2 times)
- 3KWrestling Fighting Athletes
  - 3KWrestling Openweight Championship (1 time)
  - Shinya Hashimoto Memorial Tournament (2008)
- 3L! Lucha Libre Live
  - 3L! Lucha Libre Live Championship (1 time)
- American Championship Entertainment
  - ACE Fight or Flight Championship (1 time)
  - ACE Diamond Championship (1 time)
- American Pro Wrestling Alliance
  - APWA World Super Junior Championship (2 times)
- Blackball'd Wrestling Organization
  - BWO Heavyweight Championship (1 time)
- Carolina Wrestling Showcase
  - CWS Legacy Championship (1 time)
- Eastern Pennsylvania Wrestling Entertainment
  - EPWE World Heavyweight Championship (1 time)
  - EPWE Underground Championship (1 time)
  - EPWE Underground Title Tournament (2013)
- Empire Wrestling Federation
  - EWF Heavyweight Championship (1 time)
  - EWF Tag Team Championship (5 times) – with Rocky Romero
- Funkdafied Wrestling Federation
  - FWF Tag Team Championship (1 time) – with Johnny Gunn
- Independent Wrestling Association Mid-South
  - IWA Mid-South Tag Team Championship (1 time) - with Joker
- International Wrestling Cartel
  - IWC World Heavyweight Championship (1 time)
  - IWC World Heavyweight Title Tournament (2006)
- National Championship Wrestling
  - NCW Heavyweight Championship (1 time)
- North American Wrestling Allegiance
  - NAWA Cruiserweight Championship (1 time, final)
- Outbreak Wrestling
  - OutBreak Championship (1 time)
- Pro Wrestling Illustrated
  - PWI ranked him #177 of the top 500 singles wrestlers in the PWI 500 in 2005
- Pro Wrestling Unplugged
  - PWU Tag Team Championship (1 time) – with Joker
- Ring of Honor
  - ROH Tag Team Championship (1 time) – with Rocky Romero
  - Trios Tournament (2005) – with Rocky Romero and Homicide
- SoCal Uncensored
  - Tag Team of the Year (2001) with Rocky Romero
- Monster Factory Pro Wrestling
  - MFPW Supersonic Championship (2 time)
- Susquehanna Wrestling Organization
  - SWO Uprising Championship (1 time)
- Deep South Championship Wrestling
  - DSCW Cruiserweight Championship (1 time)
- Ultimate Pro Wrestling
  - UPW Lightweight Championship (1 time)
  - UPW Tag Team Championship (1 time) – with Rocky Romero
- United Pro Wrestling Association
  - UPWA Cruiserweight Championship (1 time)
- Victory Pro Wrestling
  - VPW Heavyweight Championship (1 time)
  - VPW New York State Championship (1 time)
  - VPW Tag Team Championship (1 time) – with E.J. Risk
  - Gold Rush Rumble (2010)
- World Wrestling Council
  - WWC World Junior Heavyweight Championship (2 times)
- Other promotions
  - Southern states Championship (1 time)
  - NMRW Championship (1 time)
