= The Rottweilers =

Professional wrestling stable

Stable
- Members: Homicide; Ricky Reyes; Julius Smokes; Low Ki; Rocky Romero; Grim Reefer; Slugger; Benny Blanco; Bison
- Debut: 2003
- Disbanded: 2007

The Rottweilers were a professional wrestling stable in Ring of Honor led by Homicide. The Rottweilers were known for their disrespect towards the Code of Honor and often used cheap tactics to win matches.

== History ==
The Rottweilers started out as a stable to help Homicide feud with Steve Corino's stable, The Group. Initially, The Rottweilers were Homicide, Julius Smokes, Slugger, Grim Reefer, Bison, and Benny Blanco. However, this version of the stable gradually dwindled down to only Homicide and Smokes.

At Reborn: Stage One, Homicide challenged Samoa Joe for the ROH World Championship. During the match, the lights in the arena went out and Homicide threw a fireball at Joe, getting himself disqualified. It was revealed that Ricky Reyes was responsible, and that he and Rocky Romero (together known as the Havana Pitbulls) were the newest members of The Rottweilers. Homicide continued to feud with Joe, and at Reborn: Completion a six man tag match was held with The Rottweilers taking on Joe and The Briscoe Brothers. After the match, Low Ki returned to ROH and attacked Samoa Joe to become a member of The Rottweilers.

The feuds against Samoa Joe and the Briscoe Brothers continued. Homicide would challenge Joe again for the title at Death before Dishonor II: Part One, and the next night, Homicide and Low Ki won singles matches against Jay and Mark Briscoe. The Briscoes would defeat Homicide and Low Ki at Testing The Limit in a tag team match. That same night, Rocky Romero and Ricky Reyes won the ROH Tag Team Titles.

In late 2004, Bryan Danielson began feuding with The Rottweilers. He defeated Homicide and Low Ki at two consecutive shows, and then began a best of five series with Homicide, with each match having a stipulation. Homicide won the first two matches (Submission match, Taped Fist match), but Danielson was able to win three in a row (Falls Count Anywhere, Lumberjack, Steel Cage), thus winning the series.

At Trios Tournament 2005, The Rottweilers won the Trios Tournament by defeating Generation Next in the final round, giving all three men any match they wanted. Homicide used this match to challenge ROH World Champion Austin Aries (the man Homicide pinned to win the tournament). Ricky Reyes went after the Tag Titles with Homicide against Tony Mamaluke and Sal Rinauro, and Rocky Romero challenged Bryan Danielson for the World Title. All three men lost their matches. After losing to Danielson, Romero left Ring of Honor.

The Rottweilers were still feuding with Samoa Joe, and this time Joe's protégé Jay Lethal became involved. At Manhattan Mayhem, Low Ki and Homicide beat Joe and Lethal. That night, Lethal was the victim of a Cop Killa / Ghetto Stomp combination that injured his neck and put him out of action. When Lethal returned, he wrestled singles matches against Homicide and Low Ki respectively, but couldn't beat either man. At The Homecoming, Homicide, Low Ki, and Ricky Reyes defeated Samoa Joe, Jay Lethal, and James Gibson in a six man tag match. It looked like Lethal was going to pin Low Ki, but the Rottweilers cheated to win. Lethal finally beat Low Ki at Glory By Honor IV.

After the feud with Joe and Lethal, Homicide began a bitter rivalry with Colt Cabana. This rivalry saw Homicide attempt to kill Cabana by pouring Drāno down his throat. Homicide also tried to cut Cabana's tongue out. Even Homicide's enemy Steve Corino returned to help Cabana. After many months, the feud ended when Cabana beat Homicide in a Chicago Street Fight. After the match, Homicide showed a rare display of respect when he hugged Cabana.

In February 2006, ROH Commissioner Jim Cornette suspended Low Ki indefinitely for knocking out his tooth (in reality, Low Ki left over a dispute about travel arrangements with ROH). After Homicide became ROH's savior in the Cage of Death match against Combat Zone Wrestling at Death Before Dishonor IV, Cornette said he would grant him three requests. Homicide said he wanted a match with Steve Corino, a shot at the ROH World Championship, and the reinstatement of Low Ki. Cornette granted the first to but refused to allow Low Ki back, infuriating Homicide. Homicide spit in Cornette's face, but was then attacked by Adam Pearce. After being sprayed in the eyes with mace, Homicide was handcuffed to the ringpost, allowing Cornette to whip him with his belt.

Despite being in a feud with him, Jim Cornette was true to his word. He booked a match between Homicide and Steve Corino, and he did give Homicide (who vowed to quit ROH if he didn't win the ROH World Championship by the end of the year) a title shot at Final Battle 2006, but he was going to do everything he could to insure Homicide would fail. Around this time, Cornette also stopped booking Ricky Reyes in matches. Cornette sent The Briscoe Brothers and Adam Pearce after Homicide, who, along with Samoa Joe, was able to fight them off.

Homicide was set to face Corino in a Fight Without Honor on November 4, but Cornette would not allow a fair match. Cornette stated that while Corino could do anything he wanted to in the match, if Homicide used any weapons he would be disqualified and lose his title shot at Final Battle. Homicide had anticipated this, and brought Konnan, his partner from The Latin American Xchange stable in Total Nonstop Action Wrestling (who got booed out of Ring of Honor in 2002), to ROH to deal with Cornette. Konnan came out and, after starting in on Cornette, wanted to know why Ricky Reyes was no longer getting booked in ROH. He demanded a match between Reyes and Shane Hagadorn, one of Cornette's lackeys. Hagadorn's defeat enraged Cornette, who came out later in the show and fired Homicide from Ring of Honor. The Rottweilers and Konnan hit the ring again, and Konnan announced that the ROH promoters decided the fans would get to choose who would be fired: Homicide or Jim Cornette. In a unanimous decision, the fans fired Cornette, who was then dragged out of the building by ROH security, giving Homicide a fair fight against Steve Corino. Four years and one month after their feud began at Glory by Honor, Homicide defeated Steve Corino in a Fight Without Honor. After the match, Corino said that even though he still hated him, he respected Homicide.

Homicide then set his sights on winning the ROH World Championship, but he had to deal with Adam Pearce (angry over Cornette's release) and ROH Champion Bryan Danielson (who didn't want to lose his title). On December 8, Homicide wrestled ROH newcomer Brent Albright in a singles match. During the match, Albright caught Homicide in a Fujiware armbar, but after Homicide reached the ropes, he refused to break the hold, causing a disqualification. Albright kept the hold on him, injuring his shoulder. After finally breaking the hold, Bryan Danielson emerged from the locker room and paid Albright for the attack.

At Final Battle 2006, Homicide got his title shot for the ROH World Championship and would have to win or he would quit Ring of Honor. Earlier in the evening, Adam Pearce, still angry over Jim Cornette being fired, vowed to prevent Homicide from winning the world title. During his match, Pearce ran in and attacked Homicide in an effort to stop the match, but the referee refused to call for a disqualification. Later, Danielson caught Homicide in a submission, and after Homicide reached the ropes he refused to break the hold, but again the referee refused to call for a disqualification. Homicide then hit Danielson with a Cop-Killa, but Danielson got his foot on the rope to break the pinfall. Homicide then hit a lariat on Danielson and scored the pinfall, winning the ROH World Championship in his hometown of New York City.

On May 3, 2007, Total Nonstop Action Wrestling pulled Homicide from future Ring of Honor shows when ROH announced they would start to run pay-per-views, effectively disbanding the Rottweilers.

=== Members ===
- Version 1
  - Homicide
  - Slugger
  - Bison
  - Benny Blanco
  - Grim Reefer
  - Julius Smokes
- Version 2
  - Homicide
  - Low Ki
  - Ricky Reyes
  - Rocky Romero
  - Julius Smokes
- Version 3
  - Homicide
  - Ricky Reyes
  - Julius Smokes
- Outside members
  - B-Boy – Dubbed "The Westcoast Rottweiler", B-Boy was brought in at "This Means War" to face Colt Cabana, who was feuding with Homicide.
  - Joker – Joined The Rottweilers in their attempts to win The Pitbull/Public Enemy Tag Team Tournament Trophy in Pro Wrestling Unplugged and was named The Rottweilers assassin by Homicide. After the event, he continued to team with Ricky Reyes in Pro Wrestling Unplugged under The Rottweilers' name.
  - Monsta Mack – Made multiple appearances in ROH with The Rottweilers. Mack's name was never given, and instead commentators simply referred to him as "one of Homicide's thugs."

== Championships and accomplishments ==
- Ring of Honor
  - ROH World Championship (1 time) – Homicide
  - ROH Tag Team Championship (1 time) – Reyes and Romero
  - Trios Tournament (2005) – Homicide, Reyes and Romero
