= Generation Next (professional wrestling) =

Professional wrestling stable

Stable
- Members: Alex Shelley; Austin Aries; Jack Evans; Matt Sydal; Roderick Strong
- Name(s): Generation Next; GenNext
- Debut: May 22, 2004
- Disbanded: June 3, 2006

Generation Next (simply stylized as GenNext) was a professional wrestling stable in the Ring of Honor (ROH) promotion. Formed in Philadelphia, Pennsylvania, at the event Generation Next, on May 22, 2004, by Alex Shelley, the original Generation Next consisted of Shelley, Austin Aries, Roderick Strong and Jack Evans. Shelley was eventually kicked out of the group and replaced by Aries as the leader, who would later add Matt Sydal to the faction in the summer of 2005. On June 3, 2006 at Destiny, Aries officially disbanded Generation Next, with the four wrestling as a faction for one last time on July 29, 2006 at Generation Now.

== History ==
=== Ring of Honor ===
Generation Next made its debut on May 22, 2004 during Ring of Honor (ROH)'s Generation Next show as a villainous faction. The event was originally going to partly consist of matches between up-and-comers in the ROH roster, and the wrestlers in these matches were to be voted on by those in attendance. The first match on the card was originally going to be a triple threat tag team match between the Christopher Street Connection, The Ring Crew Express and Special K when Alex Shelley, Roderick Strong, Austin Aries, and Jack Evans ran-in and broke the match up, declaring themselves "The Best that Ring of Honor has to offer" and trashing the ballots. Aries, Evans, and Strong then went on to challenge and defeat the aforementioned Special K in a six man tag team match while Shelley defeated another Special K member, Hydro, in a singles match afterwards. Later in the night, all four defeated The Briscoe Brothers, Jimmy Rave, and R. J. Brewer in an eight man tag team match.

On July 17, 2004, Generation Next attacked Ricky Steamboat while Steamboat was facing CM Punk. CM Punk saved Steamboat from this beating, completing his turn into a fan favorite. This incident led to the feud between Generation Next and Steamboat/Second City Saints. On October 2, 2004, Generation Next defeated "Team Steamboat" (CM Punk, Ace Steel, R. J. Brewer and Jimmy Jacobs) in an eight-man elimination match, with Aries and Shelley being the sole survivors. During October 2004, Strong and Evans formed a regular tag team, Shelley was feuding with his longtime foe and former tag team partner Jimmy Jacobs, and Aries was rising in the ranks, eventually challenging then ROH World Champion, Samoa Joe. On December 26, 2004 during ROH's Final Battle 2004 show, Aries wanted Alex Shelley to step down as the leader of Generation Next. Before Shelley could give him his answer, Aries and Strong turned on him, kicking him out of the faction. Later that night, Aries defeated Samoa Joe to become the new ROH World Champion, ending Joe's reign of 21 months.

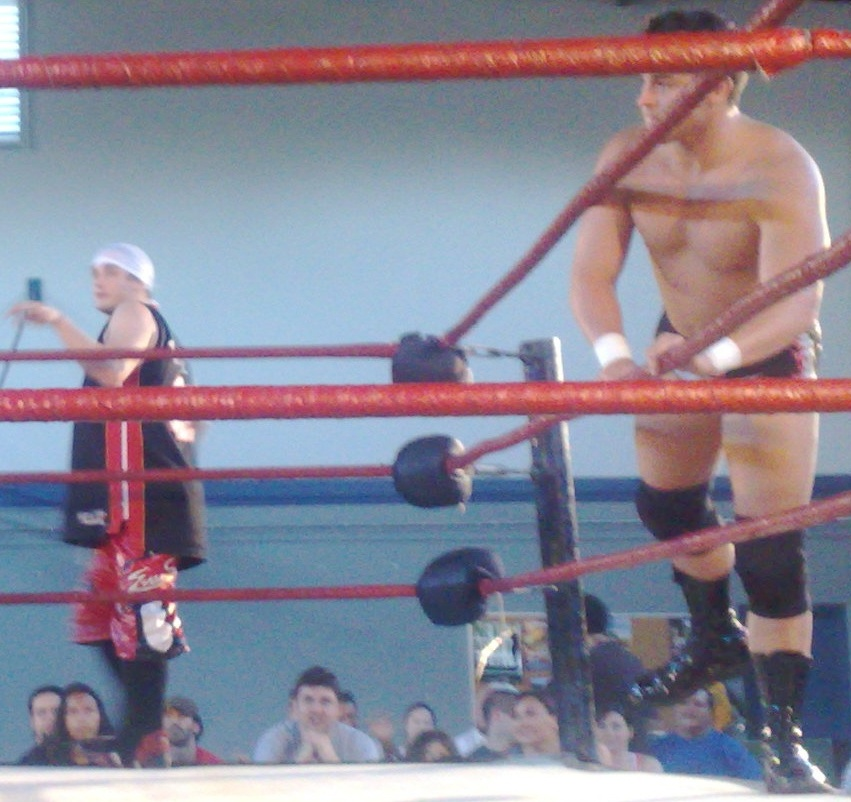
Jack Evans (left) and Roderick Strong (right) entering the ring.

On March 5, 2005, Generation Next participated in the Trios Tournament, but was defeated in the finals by The Rottweilers when Aries was pinned by Homicide. Homicide challenged Aries for the ROH World Championship, but was defeated during ROH's "Best of the American Super Juniors" tournament on April 2, 2005. Former Generation Next leader Alex Shelley, now a fan favorite, also challenged for the title during ROH's Manhattan Mayhem show, but also failed to win. On June 4, 2005, Aries and Strong attacked Shelley so brutally that Shelley had to be aided out. On June 18, 2005, Aries lost his title to CM Punk during ROH's Death Before Dishonor III show. On July 23, 2005, Alex Shelley officially became a new member of The Embassy, becoming a villain again. This caused Generation Next to become fan favorites and begin the Generation Next-Embassy feud. Aries and Strong, along with new member Matt Sydal, defeated Shelley, Jimmy Rave and Abyss (representing the Embassy) on August 12, 2005. Aries and Strong scored another victory over Embassy on August 20. After the match, The Embassy attempted to attack Mick Foley, but Generation Next fought them off. On December 3, 2005 Generation Next ended their feud with The Embassy by defeating them in the first ever Steel Cage Warfare match.

During ROH's Final Battle 2005 show on December 17, Aries and Strong defeated Sal Rinauro and Tony Mamaluke to win the ROH Tag Team Championship. Generation Next then stated that they planned to elevate the tag team title to the main event scene in ROH. As part of this process, they defended the title in Japan, giving the championship world title status. On June 3, 2006 during ROH's Destiny show, Austin Aries declared that, with Evans and Sydal wrestling in Japan for Dragon Gate, and that they had already established themselves as the top wrestlers in ROH, there was no longer any need for the Generation Next stable. At ROH's Generation Now show in July, the four members that made up Generation Next (Aries, Evans, Strong, and Sydal) teamed for one last time. They faced off against Davey Richards, Jerrelle Clark, Dave Crist and Jake Crist. After losing the match, the group disbanded, and the members went their separate ways.

=== No Remorse Corps and The Resilience ===
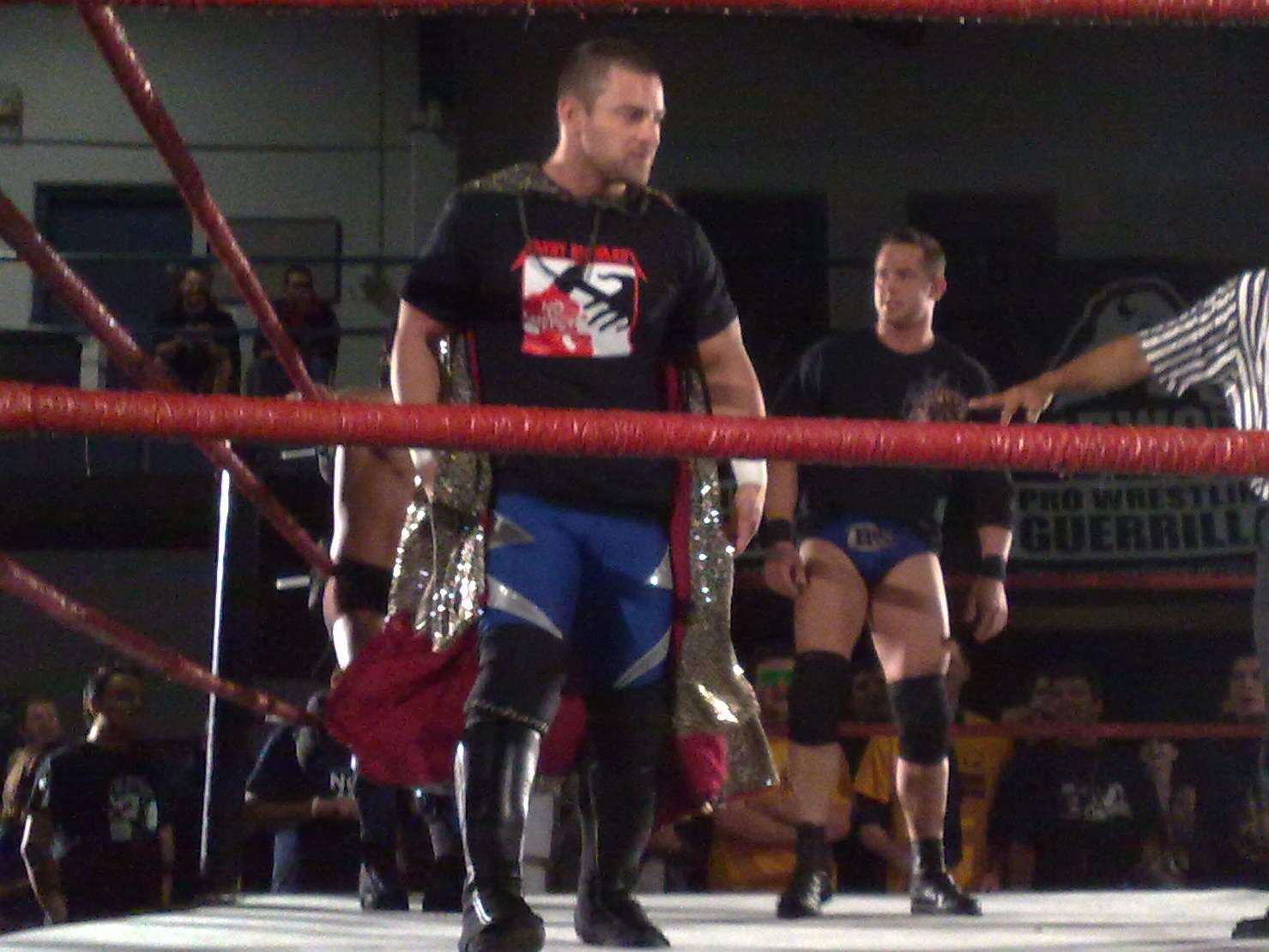
No Remorse Corps members Strong (right) and Richards (left).

At Battle of the Icons on January 27, 2007, Austin Aries and Roderick Strong teamed up with Jack Evans to defeat SHINGO, Davey Richards, and Delirious. What looked to be a Generation Next reunion of sorts was short-lived. At the first show of the Fifth Year Festival, Aries and Strong challenged Matt Sydal and Christopher Daniels for the ROH World Tag Team Championship. Midway through the match, Aries suffered a knee injury and was barely able to stand. After losing, Strong turned on Aries and began to attack him. Davey Richards came down and announced the two had formed a new tag team called No Remorse Corps. Jack Evans ran down to help Aries, but would not fight Strong, saying they were both his friends. Aries then enlisted Matt Cross, while Rocky Romero joined Strong and Richards in the No Remorse Corps.

On June 6, 2008 Strong and Richards participated in ROH's one night tournament to crown new World Tag Team Champions. They were eliminated in the first round by Austin Aries and Bryan Danielson. The next night, after Strong defeated Erick Stevens in a Fight Without Honor, he was courted by Larry Sweeney to join Sweet N'Sour Inc. He refused only to be beaten down by Richards who tore off his No Remorse Corps shirt to reveal he was wearing an S&S Inc one underneath.

=== Total Nonstop Action Wrestling / Impact Wrestling ===
In January 2006, Aries, Shelley and Strong were reunited in Total Nonstop Action Wrestling (TNA), where they formed a short-lived stable with a similar agenda as Generation Next's. The trio antagonized road agent Jerry Lynn, demanding opportunities to advance in the company. They effectively defeated all the major faces in the X Division in tag team matches, defeating A.J. Styles, Christopher Daniels and Chris Sabin in a tag match. At the following pay-per-view, they defeated the team of Sabin, Sonjay Dutt and Matt Bentley. Aries and Strong also competed in a tag team tournament, defeating The Naturals in tag team competition before losing to the team of Dutt and Sabin. The trio was unofficially disbanded in light of Aries and Strong's indefinite suspension from the company due to them showing up late to the Against All Odds pay per view. Strong was never brought back to TNA, and in 2006, Shelley went on to create Paparazzi Productions with Kevin Nash and Johnny Devine.

At Bound for Glory, Aries returned as "Austin Starr" and won the "Kevin Nash Open Invitational X Division Gauntlet Battle Royal" and presented a bowling trophy to Starr for winning the match. Starr went on to join Nash and Shelley as part of Paparazzi Productions, much to the dismay of Shelley.

Later in the year, Starr was released and soon re-joined ROH, whilst Shelley and Sabin introduced The Motor City Machine Guns to TNA. It could be said the Paparazzis had officially broken up as of April 26, therefore the same date could be said to be the end of Generation Next's association in TNA.

=== Pro Wrestling Guerrilla ===
On May 27, 2011, Generation Next reunited at Pro Wrestling Guerrilla (PWG) event All Star Weekend 8 – Night 1, when Alex Shelley saved Austin Aries and Roderick Strong from an attack by The Young Bucks (Nick and Matt Jackson) and challenged them to find a partner for a six man tag team match. The following day Aries and Strong unsuccessfully challenged The Young Bucks for the PWG World Tag Team Championship. On July 23, at PWG's eighth anniversary show, Shelley and Strong defeated El Generico and Ricochet in a tag team match.

=== 2015 WrestleCon Reunion ===
It was announced in early February 2015, that Austin Aries had been added to the WWNLive Supershow at WrestleCon. It was then revealed that Austin Aries would reunite with Roderick Strong as Generation Next for the first time in almost four years to battle Ricochet and Uhaa Nation in a tag team match.

=== WWE NXT (2016) ===
Roderick Strong made his NXT debut as Austin Aries' partner in the second annual Dusty Rhodes Tag Team Classic Tournament, defeating the team Heavy Machinery (Tucker Knight and Otis Dozovic). On October 27, Aries suffered a large orbital fracture during a live event at Fresno, California making him unable to continue to compete in the Dusty Rhodes Tag Team Classic Tournament. NXT General Manager, William Regal later announced that because of Austin Aries' injury he and Roderick Strong's quarter-final round match's winner would be determined by a singles match pitting Roderick Strong vs. Shane Thorne which Shane Thorne went on to win.

== Championships and accomplishments ==
- Ring of Honor
  - ROH World Championship (1 time) – Aries
  - ROH Tag Team Championship (1 time) – Aries and Strong
  - Survival of the Fittest (2005) – Strong
- Wrestling Observer Newsletter
  - Most Improved Wrestler (2005) – Strong

== Media ==
- Our Time is Now: The Best of Generation Next – ROH DVD
- Wrestling Machine: The Best of Austin Aries – ROH DVD
- Suffering is Inevitable: The Best of Roderick Strong – ROH DVD
- Defying Gravity: The Best of Jack Evans – ROH DVD
- The Rise of Generation Next – ROH DVD
