= List of Ring of Honor special events =

List of Non pay-per-view events/episodes & Special events produced by Ring of Honor

This is a list of special events & list of Non pay-per-view events promoted by Ring of Honor (ROH). This includes non-televised events & Non pay-per-view along with events that were televised as special episodes for Ring of Honor Wrestling.

== Past events ==
=== 2002 ===
Date	Event	Venue	Location	Main event	Notes	Ref
February 23	The Era of Honor Begins	Murphy Recreation Center	Philadelphia, Pennsylvania	Low Ki vs. Christopher Daniels vs. American Dragon		
March 30	The Round Robin Challenge	Murphy Recreation Center	Philadelphia, Pennsylvania	American Dragon vs. Low Ki		
April 27	Night of Appreciation	Murphy Recreation Center	Philadelphia, Pennsylvania	Eddy Guerrero & Amazing Red vs. The SAT (Jose & Joel Maximo)		
June 22	Road to the Title	Murphy Recreation Center	Philadelphia, Pennsylvania	Chris Daniels vs. Spanky vs. Low Ki vs. Doug Williams		
July 27	Crowning a Champion	Murphy Recreation Center	Philadelphia, Pennsylvania	Low Ki vs. Chris Daniels (with Simply Lucious) vs. Spanky vs. Doug Williams for the inaugural ROH Championship		
August 24	Honor Comes To Boston	Americal Civic Center	Wakefield, Massachusetts	Low Ki (c) vs. AJ Styles for the ROH Championship		
September 21	Unscripted	Murphy Recreation Center	Philadelphia, Pennsylvania	Christopher Daniels & Donovan Morgan vs. American Dragon & Mike Modest (for the inaugural ROH Tag Team Championship)		
October 5	Glory By Honor	Murphy Recreation Center	Philadelphia, Pennsylvania	Christopher Daniels (with Simply Lucious) vs Doug Williams		
November 9	All Star Extravaganza	Murphy Recreation Center	Philadelphia, Pennsylvania	Shinjiro Otani & Masato Tanaka vs. Steve Corino & Low Ki		
November 16	Scramble Madness	Americal Civic Center	Wakefield, Massachusetts	American Dragon vs. Doug Williams		
December 7	Night of the Butcher	Murphy Recreation Center	Philadelphia, Pennsylvania	Homicide & Abdullah the Butcher vs. The Carnage Crew (Loc & DeVito)		
December 28	Final Battle	Murphy Recreation Center	Philadelphia, Pennsylvania	American Dragon vs. Low Ki vs. Samoa Joe vs. Homicide in a #1 Contender 4-Way match for the ROH Championship		
(c) – refers to the champion(s) heading into the match

=== 2003 ===
Date	Event	Venue	Location	Main event	Notes	Ref
January 11	Revenge of the Prophecy	CCAC South Campus	West Mifflin, Pennsylvania	A.J. Styles & Low Ki vs Christopher Daniels & Xavier		
February 8	1st Anniversary Show	Elks Lodge	Queens, New York	Team ROH (Los Maximos & Devine Storm & Da Hit Squad & Mikey Whipwreck) (w/Trinity) vs. Special K (Jody Fleisch, Izzy, Dixie, Slim J, Deranged, Angel Dust, Hydro, Yeyo, Slugger)		
March 15	Expect the Unexpected	Cambridge National Guard Armory	Cambridge, Massachusetts	AJ Styles & Amazing Red vs. Christopher Daniels & Xavier (c) for the ROH Tag Team Championship's		
March 22	Night of Champions	Murphy Recreation Center	Philadelphia, Pennsylvania	Samoa Joe vs. Xavier (c) for the ROH World Championship		
April 12	Epic Encounter	Murphy Recreation Center	Philadelphia, Pennsylvania	Homicide, J-Train, Louie Ramos, Iceberg & Dusty Rhodes vs. Jack Victory, CW Anderson, David Young & Tank in an I Quit Bunkhouse Riot Match		
April 26	Round Robin Challenge II	Murphy Recreation Center	Philadelphia, Pennsylvania	Samoa Joe (c) vs. Doug Williams for the ROH Championship		
May 17	Frontiers of Honor	York Hall	London, England	Christopher Daniels vs. Jody Fleisch	Co-produced with Frontier Wrestling Alliance	
May 3	Do or Die	Murphy Recreation Center	Philadelphia, Pennsylvania	Samoa Joe (c) vs. Homicide (with Julius Smokes) for the ROH World Championship		
June 14	Night Of The Grudges	Cambridge National Guard Armory	Cambridge, Massachusetts	The Prophecy (Christopher Daniels & Dan Maff & Donovan Morgan) vs. The Group (Samoa Joe & CW Anderson & Michael Shane)		
June 28	WrestleRave	Murphy Recreation Center	Philadelphia, Pennsylvania	Trent Acid vs. Homicide in a Tables and Ladders match		
July 19	Death Before Dishonor	RexPlex	Elizabeth, New Jersey	Samoa Joe (c) vs. Paul London for the ROH World Championship		
August 9	Wrath of the Racket	Montgomery County Fairgrounds	Dayton, Ohio	AJ Styles & Homicide (c) (with Julius Smokes) vs. Chris Daniels & Danny Maff (w/Jim Cornette & Allison Danger) for the ROH Tag Team Championship's		
August 16	Bitter Friends, Stiffer Enemies	Sacred Heart University	Fairfield, Connecticut	Danny Maff vs. Low Ki		
September 6	Beating the Odds	Charbonneau Field House	Wakefield, Massachusetts	Raven vs. C.M. Punk in a Clockwork Orange House of Fun steel cage match		
September 20	Glory By Honor II	Murphy Recreation Center	Philadelphia, Pennsylvania	Samoa Joe (c) vs. Christopher Daniels for the ROH World Championship		
October 16	Tradition Continues	Michaels 8th Ave	Glen Burnie, Maryland	Samoa Joe (c) vs. Jay Briscoe (with Mark Briscoe) for the ROH World Championship		
October 25	Empire State Showdown	Salmon Creek Country Club	Spencerport, New York	Homicide (w/Julius Smokes) vs. Samoa Joe (c) in a No holds barred non-title match		
November 1	Main Event Spectacles	RexPlex	Elizabeth, New Jersey	AJ Styles vs. American Dragon		
November 28	The Conclusion	Sacred Heart University	Fairfield, Connecticut	CM Punk vs. Raven in a Steel cage match		
November 29	War of the Wire	Framingham State College	Framingham, Massachusetts	Steve Corino (with Guillotine LeGrande) vs. Homicide (with Julius Smokes) in a no ropes No Holds Barred match		
December 27	Final Battle	Pennsylvania National Guard Armory	Philadelphia, Pennsylvania	The Great Muta & Arashi (c) vs. Christopher Daniels & Danny Maff for the AJPW World Tag Team Championship		
(c) – refers to the champion(s) heading into the match

=== 2004 ===
Date	Event	Venue	Location	Main event	Notes	Ref
February 14, 2004	ROH 2nd Anniversary Show	Braintree National Guard Armory	Braintree, Massachusetts	A.J. Styles vs. CM Punk for the inaugural ROH Pure Wrestling Championship		
September 15	Glory By Honor III	Sports World	East Windsor, Connecticut	KENTA and Naomichi Marufuji vs. The Briscoe Brothers (Mark Briscoe and Jay Briscoe)		
September 16	Glory By Honor III	Manhattan Center	New York City, New York	American Dragon (c) vs. KENTA for the ROH World Championship		
October 6	Survival of the Fittest	Cleveland Grays Armory	Cleveland, Ohio	Delirious vs. Austin Aries vs. Jay Briscoe vs. Mark Briscoe vs. Matt Sydal in a Survival of the Fittest 5-Way Elimination Match		
December 23	Final Battle	Manhattan Center	New York City, New York	Samoa Joe (c) vs. Austin Aries for the ROH World Championship		
(c) – refers to the champion(s) heading into the match

=== 2005 ===
Date	Event	Venue	Location	Main event	Notes	Ref
January 15	It All Begins	Cambridge National Guard Armory	Cambridge, Massachusetts	Austin Aries (c) vs. Colt Cabana for the ROH World Championship		
February 19	Third Anniversary Celebration	Rex Plex	Elizabeth, New Jersey	The Ring Crew Express vs. Carnage Crew vs. Izzy & Deranged vs. Azrieal & Dixie vs. Jack Evans & Roderick Strong in a Scramble cage match		
February 25	Third Anniversary Celebration	Montgomery County Fairgrounds	Dayton, Ohio	Jimmy Rave (with Prince Nana) vs. AJ Styles		
February 25	Third Anniversary Celebration	Frontier Fieldhouse	Chicago Ridge, Illinois	Austin Aries (c) vs. Samoa Joe for the ROH World Championship		
June 18	Death Before Dishonor III	Mennen Sports Arena	Morristown, New Jersey	CM Punk vs. Austin Aries (c) for the ROH World Championship		
August 20	Night of Grudges II	Mennen Sports Arena	Morristown, New Jersey	James Gibson (c) vs. Spanky for the ROH World Championship		
September 17	Glory By Honor IV	Sports Plus Entertainment Center	Lake Grove, New York	AJ Styles (with Mick Foley) vs. Jimmy Rave (with Prince Nana)		
September 24	Survival of the Fittest	Dorchester National Guard Armory	Dorchester, Massachusetts	Roderick Strong vs. Austin Aries vs. Colt Cabana vs. Jay Lethal vs. Chris Daniels vs. Samoa Joe in a Survival of the Fittest Finals six-way match		
November 4	Showdown in Motown	Michigan State Fairgrounds & Expo Center	Detroit, Michigan	American Dragon (c) vs. Chris Sabin for the ROH World Championship		
December 17	Final Battle	Inman Sports Center	Edison, New Jersey	KENTA (c) vs. Low Ki for the GHC Junior Championship		
(c) – refers to the champion(s) heading into the match

=== 2006 ===
Date	Event	Venue	Location	Main event	Notes	Ref
August 12	Unified	Liverpool Olympia	Liverpool, England	American Dragon (c) (ROH World Champion) vs. Nigel McGuinness (c) (Pure Champion) in a title unification match		
January 14	Hell Freezes Over	Pennsylvania National Guard Armory	Philadelphia, Pennsylvania	American Dragon (c) vs. Chris Hero for the ROH World Championship		
January 26	Tag Wars 2006	Montgomery County Fairgrounds	Dayton, Ohio	Austin Aries & Roderick Strong (c) vs. American Dragon & Jay Lethal for the ROH Tag Team Championship's		
February 11	Unscripted II	Sports Plus Entertainment Center	Lake Grove, New York	American Dragon & C.M. Punk vs. The Embassy (Jimmy Rave & Adam Pearce)		
February 25	4th Anniversary Show	Inman Sports Club	Edison, New Jersey	Austin Aries & Roderick Strong (c) vs. A.J. Styles & Matt Sydal for the ROH Tag Team Championship's		
March 25	Best In The World	Basketball City	New York City, New York	KENTA & Naomichi Marufuji vs. American Dragon & Samoa Joe		
March 30	Dragon Gate Challenge	Michigan State Fairgrounds & Expo Center	Detroit, Michigan	Christopher Daniels vs. Samoa Joe		
March 31	Supercard of Honor	Frontier Fieldhouse	Chicago Ridge, Illinois	American Dragon (c) vs. Roderick Strong for the ROH World Championship		
April 22	The 100th Show	Pennsylvania National Guard Armory	Philadelphia, Pennsylvania	Team CZW (Combat Zone Wrestling) (Chris Hero, Necro Butcher, & Super Dragon) vs. Team ROH (Ring of Honor) (Samoa Joe, B. J. Whitmer, and Adam Pearce)		
July 15	Death Before Dishonor IV	Pennsylvania National Guard Armory	Philadelphia, Pennsylvania	Team Ring of Honor (Samoa Joe, Adam Pearce, B. J. Whitmer, Ace Steel, and American Dragon) vs. Team Combat Zone Wrestling (Chris Hero, Necro Butcher, Nate Webb, Claudio Castagnoli, and Eddie Kingston)		
August 12	Unified	Liverpool Olympia	Liverpool, England	American Dragon (c) (ROH World Champion) vs. Nigel McGuinness (c) (Pure Champion) in a title unification match		
September 15	Glory By Honor V	Sports World	East Windsor, Connecticut	KENTA & Naomichi Marufuji vs. The Briscoe Brothers		
September 16	Glory By Honor V	Manhattan Center	New York City, New York	American Dragon (c) vs. KENTA for the ROH World Championship		
October 6	Survival of the Fittest	Cleveland Grays Armory	Cleveland, Ohio	Delirious vs. Austin Aries vs. Jay Briscoe vs. Mark Briscoe vs. Matt Sydal in a Survival of the Fittest five-way elimination match		
December 23	Final Battle 2006	Manhattan Center	New York City, New York	Homicide vs. American Dragon (c) for the ROH World Championship		
(c) – refers to the champion(s) heading into the match

=== 2007 ===
Date	Event	Venue	Location	Main event	Notes	Ref
January 26	Dedicated	Braintree National Guard Armory	Braintree, Massachusetts	The Briscoes (Jay Briscoe and Mark Briscoe) vs. Austin Aries and Roderick Strong in a best two out of three falls tag team match		
January 27	Battle of the Icons	Inman Sports Club	Edison, New Jersey	Homicide (with Julius Smokes) (c) vs. Samoa Joe for the ROH World Championship		
February 16	Fifth Year Festival	Manhattan Center	New York City, New York	Homicide (c) vs. Jimmy Rave for the ROH World Championship		
February 17	Fifth Year Festival	Pennsylvania National Guard Armory	Philadelphia, Pennsylvania	Homicide (c) vs. Takeshi Morishima for the ROH World Championship		
February 23	Fifth Year Festival	Montgomery County Fairgrounds Coliseum	Dayton, Ohio	Takeshi Morishima (c) vs. B. J. Whitmer for the ROH World Championship		
February 24	Fifth Year Festival	Windy City Fieldhouse	Chicago, Illinois	Takeshi Morishima and Nigel McGuinness vs. Samoa Joe and Homicide		
March 3	Fifth Year Festival	Liverpool Olympia	Liverpool, England	Samoa Joe vs. Nigel McGuinness		
March 4	Fifth Year Festival	Liverpool Olympia	Liverpool, England	Samoa Joe vs. Homicide		
March 30	All Star Extravaganza III	Michigan State Fairgrounds & Expo Center	Detroit, Michigan	Team Dragon Gate (Cima, Dragon Kid, Ryo Saito and Susumu Yokosuka) vs. Team ROH (Austin Aries, Claudio Castagnoli, Delirious and Rocky Romero)		
March 31	Supercard of Honor II	Michigan State Fairgrounds & Expo Center	Detroit, Michigan	Typhoon (Cima and Susumu Yokosuka) and Shingo vs. Typhoon (Dragon Kid and Ryo Saito) and Masaaki Mochizuki in a Dragon Gate rules match		
Apri 13	This Means War II	Sports Plus Entertainment Center	Lake Grove, New York	Nigel McGuinness and Doug Williams vs. Chris Hero and Takeshi Morishima		
April 14	Fighting Spirit	Inman Sports Club	Edison, New Jersey	Takeshi Morishima (c) vs. Nigel McGuinness for the ROH World Championship		
April 27	The Battle Of St. Paul	St. Paul Armory	St. Paul, Minnesota	Takeshi Morishima (c) vs. Austin Aries for the ROH World Championship		
April 28	Good Times, Great Memories	Frontier Fieldhouse	Chicago Ridge, Illinois	Colt Cabana vs. Adam Pearce		
May 11	Reborn Again	Connecticut Convention Center	Hartford, Connecticut	The Briscoes (Jay Briscoe and Mark Briscoe) (c) vs. B. J. Whitmer and Takeshi Morishima for the ROH World Tag Team Championship		
June 8	A Fight at the Roxbury	Reggie Lewis Track & Athletic Center	Boston, Massachusetts	Takeshi Morishima (c) vs. Jay Briscoe for the ROH World Championship		
June 9	Domination	Pennsylvania National Guard Armory	Philadelphia, Pennsylvania	Takeshi Morishima (c) vs. Roderick Strong (with Rocky Romero) for the ROH World Championship		
June 22	United We Stand	Montgomery County Fairgrounds Coliseum	Dayton, Ohio	The Briscoes (Jay Briscoe and Mark Briscoe) (c) vs. Claudio Castagnoli and Matt Sydal in a best two out of three falls match for the ROH World Tag Team Championship		
July 16 (aired July 22)	Live In Tokyo	Differ Ariake	Tokyo, Japan	Takeshi Morishima (c) vs. Nigel McGuinness for the ROH World Championship	Co-produced with Pro Wrestling NOAH	
July 17 (aired August 9)	Live in Osaka	Osaka Prefectural Gymnasium	Osaka, Japan	Bryan Danielson, CIMA, and Naomichi Marufuji vs. No Remorse Corps (Davey Richards and Rocky Romero) and Masaaki Mochizuki (with Roderick Strong)	Co-produced with Pro Wrestling NOAH	
July 27	Race to the Top Tournament	Deer Park Community Center	Deer Park, New York	The Briscoes (Jay Briscoe and Mark Briscoe) (c) vs. Bryan Danielson and Nigel McGuinness for the ROH World Tag Team Championship		
July 28	Race to the Top Tournament	Inman Sports Club	Edison, New Jersey	Claudio Castagnoli vs. El Generico in the Race To The Top Tournament Final		
August 10	Death Before Dishonor V	Roxbury Community College	Boston, Massachusetts	The Briscoes (Jay Briscoe and Mark Briscoe) vs. Kevin Steen and El Generico in a Boston Street Fight		
August 11	Death Before Dishonor V	Pennsylvania National Guard Armory	Philadelphia, Pennsylvania	The Resilience (Austin Aries, Matt Cross and Erick Stevens) and Delirious vs. No Remorse Corps (Roderick Strong, Davey Richards and Rocky Romero) and Matt Sydal in a Philadelphia Street Fight		
August 24	Caged Rage	Connecticut Convention Center	Hartford, Connecticut	The Briscoes (Jay Briscoe and Mark Briscoe) (c) vs. Kevin Steen and El Generico in a Steel cage match for the ROH World Tag Team Championship		
August 25	Manhattan Mayhem II	Manhattan Center	New York City, New York	The Briscoes (Jay Briscoe and Mark Briscoe) (c) vs. Kevin Steen and El Generico in a best two out of three falls tag team match for the ROH World Tag Team Championship		
September 14	Motor City Madness	Michigan State Fairgrounds & Expo Center	Detroit, Michigan	The Briscoes (Jay Briscoe and Mark Briscoe) (c) vs. The Resilience (Austin Aries and Matt Cross) for the ROH World Tag Team Championship		
October 5	Honor Nation	Roxbury Community College	Boston, Massachusetts	Takeshi Morishima (c) vs. Kevin Steen for the ROH World Championship		
October 19	Survival of the Fittest	Empire Ballroom	Las Vegas, Nevada	Austin Aries vs. Chris Hero vs. Delirious vs. Human Tornado vs. Rocky Romero vs. Roderick Strong in a Survival of the Fittest Finals six-way match		
October 21	Chaos at the Cow Palace	Cow Palace	Daly City, California	Nigel McGuinness (c) vs. Jay Briscoe for the ROH World Championship		
November 2	Glory by Honor VI	Pennsylvania National Guard Armory	Philadelphia, Pennsylvania	Mitsuharu Misawa and KENTA vs. Takeshi Morishima and Naomichi Marufuji		
November 3	Glory by Honor VI	Manhattan Center	New York City, New York	The Briscoes (Jay Briscoe and Mark Briscoe) (c) vs. The Age of the Fall (Jimmy Jacobs and Necro Butcher) in a Street Fight for the ROH World Tag Team Championship		
November 30	Reckless Abandon	Montgomery County Fairgrounds Coliseum	Dayton, Ohio	The Briscoes (Jay Briscoe and Mark Briscoe) vs. The Vulture Squad (Jack Evans and Jigsaw) vs. The Age Of The Fall (Jimmy Jacobs and Tyler Black) vs. The Hangmen Three (B. J. Whitmer and Brent Albright) in a four-way tag team scramble match		
December 1	Unscripted III	Frontier Fieldhouse	Chicago Ridge, Illinois	Erick Stevens and The Briscoes (Jay Briscoe and Mark Briscoe) vs. No Remorse Corps (Davey Richards, Rocky Romero and Roderick Strong)		
December 30	Final Battle	Manhattan Center	New York City, New York	The Briscoe Brothers (Jay Briscoe and Mark Briscoe) (c) vs. The Age of the Fall (Jimmy Jacobs and Tyler Black) for the ROH World Tag Team Championship		
(c) – refers to the champion(s) heading into the match

=== 2008 ===
Date	Event	Venue	Location	Main event	Notes	Ref
January 11	Proving Ground	Boston University	Boston, Massachusetts	The Age Of The Fall (Jimmy Jacobs and Tyler Black) (with Lacey) (c) vs. The Briscoes (Jay Briscoe and Mark Briscoe) vs. The Hangmen Three (B. J. Whitmer and Brent Albright) (with Shane Hagadorn) vs. The Vulture Squad (Jack Evans and Jigsaw) (with Mercedes Martinez) in an Ultimate Endurance match for the ROH World Tag Team Championship		
March 29	Supercard of Honor III	Orlando Downtown Recreation Complex	Orlando, Florida	Typhoon (Cima, Susumu Yokosuka and Ryo Saito) (Naruki Doi, Masato Yoshino and Genki Horiguchi) in a Dragon Gate rules match		
August 2	Death Before Dishonor VI	Hammerstein Ballroom	New York City, New York	Nigel McGuinness (c) vs. Bryan Danielson vs. Claudio Castagnoli vs. Tyler Black in a Four-Way Elimination match for the ROH World Championship		
September 13	Battle of the Best	Differ Ariake	Tokyo, Japan	Age of the Fall (Jimmy Jacobs and Tyler Black) (c) vs. The Briscoes (Jay Briscoe and Mark Briscoe) for the ROH World Tag Team Championship		
September 14	The Tokyo Summit	Differ Ariake	Tokyo, Japan	Nigel McGuinness (c) vs. Jimmy Jacobs for the ROH World Championship		
December 6	Southern Hostility	Vanderbilt University Memorial Gym	Nashville, Tennessee	Nigel McGuinness (c) vs. Jerry Lynn for the ROH World Championship		
December 27	Final Battle	Hammerstein Ballroom	New York City, New York	Bryan Danielson vs. Takeshi Morishima in a fight without honor match		
(c) – refers to the champion(s) heading into the match

=== 2009 ===
Date	Event	Venue	Location	Main event	Notes	Ref
January 16	Full Circle	Sports Network and Fitness	Manassas, Virginia	Tyler Black vs. Nigel McGuinness		
April 3	Supercard of Honor IV	George R. Brown Convention Center	Houston, Texas	Nigel McGuinness (c) vs. Jerry Lynn for the ROH World Championship		
July 24, 2009	Death Before Dishonor VII	Ted Reeve Arena	Toronto, Ontario	Austin Aries (c) vs. Jerry Lynn vs. Nigel McGuinness vs. Tyler Black in a Four Corner Survival match for the ROH World Championship	This was a 2-night event	
July 25, 2009	Death Before Dishonor VII	Ted Reeve Arena	Toronto, Ontario	Chris Hero vs. Lance Storm	This was a 2-night event	
November 13	Aries Vs. Richards	Rock Financial Showplace	Novi, Michigan	Austin Aries (c) vs. Davey Richards (with Shane Hagadorn) for the ROH World Championship		
(c) – refers to the champion(s) heading into the match

=== 2010 ===
Date	Event	Venue	Location	Main event	Notes	Ref
January 29	SoCal Showdown	Hilton Los Angeles Airport Hotel	Los Angeles, California	The American Wolves (Davey Richards and Eddie Edwards) and The Kings of Wrestling (Chris Hero and Claudio Castagnoli) vs. The Briscoes (Jay Briscoe and Mark Briscoe) and The Young Bucks (Matt Jackson and Nick Jackson) in an eight man tag team war	Held in conjunction with WrestleReunion 4	
February 13	8th Anniversary Show	Manhattan Center	New York City, New York	Austin Aries (c) vs. Tyler Black for the ROH World Championship		
March 19	Gold Rush	Ford Community & Performing Arts Center	Dearborn, Michigan	The Briscoes (Jay Briscoe and Mark Briscoe) and Tyler Black vs. Chris Hero and The American Wolves (Davey Richards and Eddie Edwards) in a six-man tag team match		
March 20	Epic Encounter III	International Centre	Mississauga, Ontario, Canada	Davey Richards vs. Kenny Omega		
March 26	From The Ashes	Phoenix College	Phoenix, Arizona	The Briscoes (Jay Briscoe and Mark Briscoe) (c) vs. The American Wolves (Davey Richards and Eddie Edwards) for the ROH World Tag Team Championship		
March 27	Phoenix Rising	Phoenix College	Phoenix, Arizona	Tyler Black (c) vs. Austin Aries vs. Roderick Strong in a three-way match for the ROH World Championship		
April 23	Pick Your Poison	Montgomery County Fairgrounds Coliseum	Dayton, Ohio	Tyler Black (c) vs. Kenny King for the ROH World Championship		
April 24	Bitter Friends, Stiffer Enemies 2	Frontier Fieldhouse	Chicago Ridge, Illinois	Colt Cabana and El Generico vs. Kevin Steen and Steve Corino in a Chicago Street Fight		
May 7	Civil Warfare	Sports Network & Fitness	Manassas, Virginia	Delirious and Tyler Black (w/Daizee Haze) vs. Austin Aries and Rhett Titus		
May 8	Supercard of Honor V	Manhattan Center	New York City, New York	Tyler Black (c) vs. Roderick Strong for the ROH World Championship		
June 18	Buffalo Stampede II	Erie County Fairgrounds	Hamburg, New York	Tyler Black (c) vs. Steve Corino in a Non-title match		
June 19, 2010	Death Before Dishonor VIII	Ted Reeve Arena	Toronto, Ontario	Tyler Black (c) vs.Davey Richards for the ROH World Championship		
July 22	Bluegrass Brawl	Davis Arena	Louisville, Kentucky	The Briscoes (Jay Briscoe and Mark Briscoe) vs. The American Wolves (Davey Richards and Eddie Edwards)		
July 23	Hate: Chapter II	Gateway Center	Collinsville, Illinois	Amazing Kong and The Briscoes (Jay Briscoe and Mark Briscoe) vs. Sara Del Rey and The Kings of Wrestling (Chris Hero and Claudio Castagnoli) in a mixed six wrestler tag team match		
August 27	Champions Challenge	Richmond International Raceway	Richmond, Virginia	Tyler Black vs. Eddie Edwards in a non-title match		
August 29	Tag Wars	Metrolina Expo Center	Charlotte, North Carolina	The Kings of Wrestling (Chris Hero and Claudio Castagnoli) (w/Shane Hagadorn) (c) vs. The All-Night Express (Kenny King and Rhett Titus) vs. The Briscoes (Jay Briscoe and Mark Briscoe) vs. The Dark City Fight Club (Jon Davis and Kory Chavis) in a Tag Wars Final Ultimate Endurance Match for the ROH World Tag Team Championship		
September 10	Fade To Black	Plymouth Memorial Hall	Plymouth, Massachusetts	Christopher Daniels vs. Tyler Black in a non-title match		
October 15	Allied Forces	Montgomery County Fairgrounds Coliseum	Dayton, Ohio	The Kings of Wrestling (Chris Hero and Claudio Castagnoli) (w/Shane Hagadorn) (c) vs. Christopher Daniels and Davey Richards for the ROH World Tag Team Championship		
October 16	Richards vs. Daniels	Frontier Fieldhouse	Chicago Ridge, Illinois	Davey Richards vs. Christopher Daniels		
November 12	Survival of the Fittest	Ford Community & Performing Arts Center	Dearborn, Michigan	Eddie Edwards vs. Adam Cole vs. Claudio Castagnoli vs. Kenny King vs. Kevin Steen vs. Rhett Titus in a Survival of the Fittest final six-way elimination match		
November 13	Fate of an Angel II	International Centre	Mississauga, Ontario, Canada	Roderick Strong (w/Truth Martini) (c) vs. Christopher Daniels for the ROH World Championship		
December 17	Tag Title Classic II	Plymouth Memorial Hall	Plymouth, Massachusetts	The Kings of Wrestling (Chris Hero and Claudio Castagnoli) (w/Sara Del Rey and Shane Hagadorn) (c) vs. The American Wolves (Davey Richards and Eddie Edwards) for the ROH World Tag Team Championship		
(c) – refers to the champion(s) heading into the match

=== 2011 ===
Date	Event	Venue	Location	Main event	Notes	Ref
January 14	Champions vs. All Stars	Richmond International Raceway	Richmond, Virginia	Davey Richards, El Generico, and The Briscoes (Jay Briscoe and Mark Briscoe) vs. Christopher Daniels, Roderick Strong, and The Kings of Wrestling (Chris Hero and Claudio Castagnoli) (w/Shane Hagadorn) in an eight man tag team match		
January 15	Only The Strong Survive	Metrolina Tradeshow Expo	Charlotte, North Carolina	Roderick Strong (c) vs. Jay Briscoe for the ROH World Championship		
January 28	SoCal Showdown II	Hilton Los Angeles Airport Hotel	Los Angeles, California	Roderick Strong (c) vs. El Generico for the ROH World Championship		
February 25	World's Greatest	Montgomery County Fairgrounds Coliseum	Dayton, Ohio	Davey Richards and Wrestling's Greatest Tag Team (Charlie Haas and Shelton Benjamin) vs. Roderick Strong and The Kings of Wrestling (Chris Hero and Claudio Castagnoli) in a six man tag team match		
March 18	Defy or Deny	Plymouth Memorial Hall	Plymouth, Massachusetts	Roderick Strong vs. El Generico vs. Homicide vs. Jay Briscoe in a four way Defy or Deny elimination match		
March 19	Manhattan Mayhem IV	Manhattan Center	New York City, New York	Roderick Strong (c) vs. Eddie Edwards for the ROH World Championship		
May 6	Revolution: USA	Ford Community & Performing Arts Center	Dearborn, Michigan	The Kings of Wrestling (Chris Hero and Claudio Castagnoli) vs. The American Wolves (Davey Richards and Eddie Edwards)		
May 7	Revolution: Canada	Ted Reeve Arena	Toronto, Ontario, Canada	Eddie Edwards (c) vs. Chris Hero for the ROH World Championship		
May 21	Supercard of Honor VI	Frontier Fieldhouse	Chicago Ridge, Illinois	Eddie Edwards (c) vs. Roderick Strong for the ROH World Championship		
July 8	Tag Team Turmoil	Richmond International Raceway	Richmond, Virginia	The American Wolves (Davey Richards and Eddie Edwards) vs. The House of Truth (Michael Elgin and Roderick Strong)		
July 9	No Escape	Metrolina Tradeshow Expo	Charlotte, North Carolina	El Generico vs. Roderick Strong		
November 6	Gateway to Honor	Gateway Center	Collinsville, Illinois	The All-Night Express (Kenny King and Rhett Titus) vs. The American Wolves (Davey Richards and Eddie Edwards)		
November 18	Survival of the Fittest	Montgomery County Fairgrounds Coliseum	Dayton, Ohio	Michael Elgin vs. Eddie Edwards vs. Jay Briscoe and Kyle O'Reilly vs. Mark Briscoe vs. Roderick Strong in a Survival of the Fittest 2011 final six way elimination match		
November 19	Glory by Honor X	Frontier Fieldhouse	Chicago Ridge, Illinois	Davey Richards (c) vs. El Generico for the ROH World Championship		
December 3	Southern Defiance	Spartanburg Memorial Auditorium	Spartanburg, South Carolina	Jay Lethal vs. Adam Cole vs. Caprice Coleman vs. Cedric Alexander vs. Charlie Haas vs. Eddie Edwards vs. El Generico vs. Grizzly Redwood vs. Harlem Bravado vs. Jay Briscoe vs. Kenny King vs. Lancelot Bravado vs. Mark Briscoe vs. Matt Jackson and Michael Elgin vs. Mike Bennett vs. Nick Jackson vs. Rhett Titus vs. Roderick Strong vs. Shelton Benjamin		
December 4	Northern Aggression	Greensboro Coliseum	Greensboro, North Carolina	Eddie Edwards, El Generico, and Wrestling's Greatest Tag Team (Charlie Haas and Shelton Benjamin) vs. The Briscoes (Jay Briscoe and Mark Briscoe) and The House of Truth (Michael Elgin and Roderick Strong) in an eight man tag team match		
(c) – refers to the champion(s) heading into the match

=== 2012 ===
Date	Event	Venue	Location	Main event	Notes	Ref
January 20	The Homecoming	Pennsylvania National Guard Armory	Philadelphia, Pennsylvania	Davey Richards (c) vs. Jay Lethal for the ROH World Championship		
January 21	Underground	Norfolk Scope	Norfolk, Virginia	Team Ambition (Davey Richards and Kyle O'Reilly) vs. The House Of Truth (Michael Elgin and Roderick Strong) (w/Truth Martini) in an ROH World Tag Team Championship #1 contendership match		
April 28	Unity	Frontier Fieldhouse	Chicago Ridge, Illinois	The Briscoes (Jay Briscoe and Mark Briscoe) (c) vs. Hallowicked and Jigsaw for the ROH World Tag Team Championship		
April 29	Rising Above	Hara Arena	Dayton, Ohio	Davey Richards (c) vs. Adam Cole for the ROH World Championship		
May 19	The Battle of Richmond	Greater Richond Convention Center	Richmond, Virginia	Charlie Haas vs. Jay Briscoe in an unsanctioned match		
June 15 (aired June 30 and July 7)	The Nightmare Begins	Charleston Civic Center	Charleston, West Virginia	Jay Briscoe vs. Charlie Haas in a Texas death match		
June 30	Live Strong	Rostraver Ice Garden	Belle Vernon, Pennsylvania	Kevin Steen (w/Jimmy Jacobs) (c) vs. Roderick Strong (w/Truth Martini) for the ROH World Championship		
July 14	Brew City Beatdown	Turner Hall Ballroom	Milwaukee, Wisconsin	The Briscoes (Jay Briscoe and Mark Briscoe) vs. Jimmy Jacobs and Kevin Steen in an anything goes tag team match		
September 8	Caged Hostility	Metrolina Tradeshow Expo	Charlotte, North Carolina	Rhett Titus and The Briscoes (Jay Briscoe and Mark Briscoe) vs. SCUM (Jimmy Jacobs, Kevin Steen, and Steve Corino) in a steel cage six man tag team match		
October 13	Killer Instinct	International Centre	Mississauga, Ontario, Canada	Kevin Steen (c) vs. Jay Lethal for the ROH World Championship		
(c) – refers to the champion(s) heading into the match

=== 2013 ===
Date	Event	Venue	Location	Main event	Notes	Ref
January 18	The Hunt for Gold	Ford Community & Performing Arts Center	Dearborn, Michigan			
January 19	Defy or Deny 2	Turner Hall Ballroom	Milwaukee, Wisconsin			
February 16	Honor vs. Evil	Cincinnati Masonic Center	Cincinnati, Ohio			
March 30	War	WNC Agriculture Center	Asheville, North Carolina			
May 11	Dragon's Reign	Rostraver Ice Gardens	Belle Vernon, Pennsylvania			
May 18 (aired June 15)	Relentless	Greater Richmond Convention Center	Richmond, Virginia			
June 1	Honor in the Heart of Texas	San Antonio Shrine Auditorium	San Antonio, Texas			
June 8	Live and Let Die	Ohio Expo Center	Columbus, Ohio			
July 11	A Night of Hoopla	115 Bourbon Street	Chicago, Illinois	B. J. Whitmer, Michael Elgin and MsChif vs. Adrenaline Rush (A.C.H. and TaDarius Thomas) and Athena		
July 12	Reclamation	Turner Hall Ballroom	Milwaukee, Wisconsin			
July 13	Reclamation	Ford Community & Performing Arts Center	Dearborn, Michigan			
August 3	All Star Extravaganza V	Mattamy Athletic Centre	Toronto, Ontario, Canada			
August 17	Manhattan Mayhem V	Hammerstein Ballroom	New York City, New York			
September 6	Road to Greatness	Camp Jordan Arena	East Ridge, Tennessee			
September 7	Road to Greatness	Boutwell Auditorium	Birmingham, Alabama			
September 28	A New Dawn	Hopkins Eisenhower Community Center	Hopkins, Minnesota			
October 5	Charm City Challenge	Du Burns Arena	Baltimore, Maryland			
October 26	Glory By Honor XII	Frontier Fieldhouse	Chicago Ridge, Illinois	Michael Elgin, Jay Lethal, Caprice Coleman and Cedric Alexander vs. Adam Cole, Bobby Fish, Kyle O'Reilly and Matt Taven (with Truth Martini)		
November 2	The Golden Dream	Cincinnati Masonic Center	Cincinnati, Ohio	Jay Briscoe vs. Kevin Steen in an ROH World Championship #1 contendership match		
November 15	Pursuit	Ford Community & Performing Arts Center	Dearborn, Michigan			
November 16	Pursuit	Ohio Expo Center	Columbus, Ohio			
December 14	Final Battle	Hammerstein Ballroom	New York City, New York	Adam Cole (c) vs. Michael Elgin vs. Jay Briscoe for the ROH World Championship		
(c) – refers to the champion(s) heading into the match

=== 2014 ===
Date	Event	Venue	Location	Main event	Notes	Ref
January 25 (aired February 8, 15, and 22)	Wrestling's Finest	David L. Lawrence Convention Center	Pittsburgh, Pennsylvania			
March 7	Raising The Bar	Turner Hall	Milwaukee, Wisconsin			
March 8 (aired April 5)	Raising The Bar	Frontier Fieldhouse	Chicago Ridge, Illinois			
March 22	Flyin' High	Montgomery County Fairgrounds Coliseum	Dayton, Ohio			
April 4 (aired April 12 and 19)	Supercard of Honor VIII	Alario Center	Westwego, Louisiana	Adam Cole (c) vs. Jay Briscoe in a ladder war for the ROH World Championship		
June 6	Road to Best in the World	SIU Student Center	Carbondale, Illinois			
June 7	Road to Best in the World	Gateway Center	Collinsville, Illinois			
June 12	Summer Heat Tour	Hopkins Eisenhower Community Center	Hopkins, Minnesota			
June 18	Summer Heat Tour	Cincinnati Masonic Center	Cincinnati, Ohio			
August 15	Field of Honor	MCU Park	Brooklyn, New York	Michael Elgin (c) vs. Jay Briscoe vs. AJ Styles vs. Adam Cole in a 4 way match for the ROH World Championship		
August 22 (aired September 13 and 20)	Death Before Dishonor XII	Turner Hall	Milwaukee, Wisconsin	Michael Elgin (c) vs. Silas Young for the ROH World Championship		
August 23 (aired September 27 and October 4)	Death Before Dishonor XII	Frontier Fieldhouse	Chicago Ridge, Illinois	The Young Bucks (Matt Jackson and Nick Jackson) and reDRagon (Bobby Fish and Kyle O'Reilly) vs. The Addiction (Christopher Daniels and Frankie Kazarian) and The Briscoes (Jay Briscoe and Mark Briscoe) in an eight-man tag team match		
October 9	Michael Bennett's Bachelor Party Hosted by Adam Cole	115 Bourbon Street	Merrionette Park, Illinois			
October 11	Champions vs. All Stars	Wings Stadium	Kalamazoo, Michigan			
November 7	Survival of the Fittest	Ohio Expo Center and State Fairgrounds	Columbus, Ohio			
November 8	Survival of the Fittest	SeaGate Convention Centre	Toledo, Ohio			
November 15	Glory By Honor XIII	San Antonio Shrine Auditorim	San Antonio, Texas	Jay Briscoe (c) vs. A. C. H. for the ROH World Championship		
(c) – refers to the champion(s) heading into the match

=== 2015 ===
Date	Event	Venue	Location	Main event	Notes	Ref
January 30	Winter Warriors Tour	Ford Community & Performing Arts Center	Dearborn, Michigan	Jay Lethal (w/J. Diesel and Truth Martini) (c) vs. Roderick Strong for the ROH World Television Championship		
January 31	Winter Warriors Tour	Montgomery County Fairgrounds Coliseum	Dayton, Ohio			
February 21	Winter Warriors Tour	North Atlanta Trade Center	Norcross, Georgia			
March 13	Conquest Tour	Turner Hall	Milwaukee, Wisconsin			
March 14	Conquest Tour	Frontier Fieldhouse	Chicago Ridge, Illinois			
May 12 (aired June 27)	War of the Worlds	2300 Arena	Philadelphia, Pennsylvania	reDRagon (Bobby Fish and Kyle O'Reilly) vs, Hiroshi Tanahashi and Jyushin Thunder Liger	Co-produced with New Japan Pro-Wrestling	
May 13 (aired May 30, June 6, June 13, and June 20)	War of the Worlds	2300 Arena	Philadelphia, Pennsylvania	The Kingdom (Adam Cole, Matt Taven, and Michael Bennett) (w/Maria Kanellis) vs. Bullet Club (AJ Styles, Matt Jackson, and Nick Jackson) in a six man tag team match	Co-produced with New Japan Pro-Wrestling	
May 16	Global Wars	Ted Reeve Arena	Toronto, Ontario, Canada	Bullet Club (AJ Styles, Matt Jackson, and Nick Jackson) vs. Chaos (Beretta, Kazuchika Okada and Rocky Romero) in a six man tag team match		
July 16	Aftershock	Hopkins Eisenhower Community Center	Hopkins, Minnesota			
July 17	Aftershock	Sam's Town Hotel & Gambling Hall	Las Vegas, Nevada			
October 23 (aired November 7, 14, 21, and 28)	Glory By Honor XIV	Wings Event Center	Kalamazoo, Michigan	The Kingdom (Adam Cole, Matt Taven and Michael Bennett) (with Maria Kanellis) vs. Dalton Castle and War Machine (Hanson and Raymond Rowe)	Was a 2-night event First night was a television taping for Ring of Honor Wrestling	
October 24	Glory By Honor XIV	Montgomery County Fairgrounds Coliseum	Dayton, Ohio	ROH Champions (Jay Lethal (World), Roderick Strong (TV) and The Kingdom (Matt Taven and Michael Bennett) (with Truth Martini and Maria Kanellis) (Tag Team) vs. ROH All-Stars (Moose, The Addiction (Christopher Daniels and Frankie Kazarian) and Dalton Castle) (with Stokley Hathaway and Chris Sabin)	Was a 2-night event First night was a television taping for Ring of Honor Wrestling	
November 13	Survival of the Fittest	Turner Hall Ballroom	Milwaukee, Wisconsin	Bullet Club (A.J. Styles and The Young Bucks (Matt Jackson and Nick Jackson)) vs. The House of Truth (Jay Lethal, Donovan Dijak and Joey Daddiego) (with Truth Martini and Taeler Hendrix)	Was a 2-night event.	
November 14	Survival of the Fittest	Hopkins Eisenhower Community Center	Hopkins, Minnesota	Michael Elgin vs. Jay Briscoe vs. Christopher Daniels vs. A. C. H. vs. Silas Young (with Beer City Bruiser); Winner received an ROH World Championship match	Was a 2-night event.	
November 27	SuperShow of Honor 2	Evoque	Preston, England	Jay Lethal (c) vs. Noam Dar for the ROH World Championship	Co-produced with Preston City Wrestling	
November 28	SuperShow of Honor 2	Evoque	Preston, England	Jay Lethal (c) vs. Doug Williams for the ROH World Championship	Co-produced with Preston City Wrestling	
November 28	SuperShow of Honor 2	Evoque	Preston, England	Dave Mastiff (c) vs. Adam Cole in a 30 minute iron man match for the PCW Championship	Co-produced with Preston City Wrestling	
November 29	SuperShow of Honor 2	Evoque	Preston, England	Roderick Strong vs. Jay Lethal	Co-produced with Preston City Wrestling	
December 5	Road to Final Battle	Fort Lauderdale War Memorial Auditorium	Fort Lauderdale, Florida	The Young Bucks (Matt Jackson and Nick Jackson defeat The House of Truth (Donovan Dijak and Jay Lethal) (w/Truth Martini)		
(c) – refers to the champion(s) heading into the match

=== 2016 ===
Date	Event	Venue	Location	Main event	Notes	Ref
November 3	Survival of the Fittest	Arlington Convention Center	Arlington, Texas	The Briscoes (Jay Briscoe and Mark Briscoe) vs. War Machine (Hanson and Raymond Rowe) vs Keith Lee and Shane Taylor	Was a 2-night event.	
November 4	Survival of the Fittest	San Antonio Shrine Auditorium	San Antonio, Texas	Bobby Fish vs Lio Rush vs. Punishment Martinez vs. Jax Dane vs. Dalton Castle vs. The Panther Survival of the Fittest tournament final Six-way elimination match Winner received an ROH World Championship match	Was a 2-night event.	
November 18 (aired December 24)	Reach for the Sky	Liverpool Olympia	Liverpool, England	The Briscoes (Jay Briscoe & Mark Briscoe) & Kyle O'Reilly vs. The Bullet Club (Adam Cole & The Young Bucks (Matt Jackson and Nick Jackson))		
November 19	Reach for the Sky	Leicester Community Sports Arena	Leicester, England	Marty Scurll and Will Ospreay vs. The Young Bucks (Matt Jackson and Nick Jackson) (c) for the ROH World Tag Team Championship		
November 20	Reach for the Sky	York Hall	London, England	Jay Lethal vs. Adam Cole (c) for the ROH World Championship		
(c) – refers to the champion(s) heading into the match

=== 2017 ===
Date	Event	Venue	Location	Main event	Notes	Ref
February 3	Undisputed Legacy	Austin Highway Event Center	San Antonio, Texas	BULLET CLUB (Adam Cole, Hangman Page, Matt Jackson, and Nick Jackson) vs. Jay White, Lio Rush, and the Motor City Machine Guns (Alex Shelley and Chris Sabin) in an eight man tag team match		
February 4	Honor Reigns Supreme	Gilley's Dallas	Dallas, Texas	The Young Bucks (Matt Jackson and Nick Jackson) (c) vs. The Briscoes (Jay Briscoe and Mark Briscoe) in a best two out of three falls match for the ROH World Tag Team Championship		
February 12	The Experience	Express Live!	Columbus, Ohio	Lio Rush vs. Marty Scurll in a ROH World Television Championship Proving Ground best two out of three falls match		
March 4	Manhattan Mayhem	Hammerstein Ballroom	New York City, New York			
April 28	Unauthorized	Turner Hall Ballroom	Milwaukee, Wisconsin	Adam Cole vs. Jay White		
April 29	Masters of the Craft	Hopkins Eisenhower Community Center	Hopkins, Minnesota			
May 7	War of the Worlds	Ted Reeve Arena	Toronto, Ontario, Canada		Co-produced with New Japan Pro-Wrestling	
May 10	War of the Worlds	Ford Community & Performing Arts Center	Dearborn, Michigan		Co-produced with New Japan Pro-Wrestling	
May 14	War of the Worlds	2300 Arena	Philadelphia, Pennsylvania		Co-produced with New Japan Pro-Wrestling	
October 28	Soaring Eagle Cup	Soaring Eagle Casino & Resort	Mount Pleasant, Michigan	Dalton Castle vs. Frankie Kazarian vs. Matt Taven vs. Silas Young in a Soaring Eagle Cup final four-way elimination match		
August 18	War of the Worlds UK: London	York Hall	London, England	Los Ingobernables de Japón (Bushi, Evil, Hiromu Takahashi, Sanada, and Tetsuya Naito) vs. Bullet Club (Cody, Hangman Page, Marty Scurll, Matt Jackson and Nick Jackson)	Co-produced with New Japan Pro-Wrestling, Consejo Mundial de Lucha Libre, and Revolution Pro Wrestling	
August 20	War of the Worlds UK: Edinburgh	Edinburgh Corn Exchange	Edinburgh, Scotland	Silas Young vs. Jay Lethal in a Street fight	Co-produced with New Japan Pro-Wrestling, Consejo Mundial de Lucha Libre, and Revolution Pro Wrestling	
November 17	Survival of the Fittest	Austin Highway Event Center	San Antonio, Texas			
November 18	Survival of the Fittest	Gilley's Dallas	Dallas, Texas			
November 19	Survival of the Fittest	Cox Convention Center	Oklahoma City, Oklahoma			
(c) – refers to the champion(s) heading into the match

=== 2019 ===
Date	Event	Venue	Location	Main event	Notes	Ref
March 16 (aired March 29, April 5, April 12, and April 19)	17th Anniversary Show	Sam's Town Hotel and Gambling Hall	Sunrise Manor, Nevada	Dalton Castle and The Boys (Boy #1 and Boy #2) vs. The Young Lions (Clark Conners, Karl Fredericks, and Alex Coughlin) in a six man tag team match	Aired as special episodes of Ring of Honor Wrestling	
August 16	Future of Honor	MCW Arena	Joppa, Maryland	Dante Caballero (c) vs. Brandon Scott for the MCW Heavyweight Championship	Co-produced with MCW Pro Wrestling	
August 21	Future of Honor: Honor Games	MCW Arena	Joppa, Maryland	Dante Caballero (c) vs. Rhett Titus vs. Austin Gunn vs. Brian Johnson vs. Greg Excellent vs. Joe Keys vs. Ken Dixon in a seven way scramble match for the MCW Heavyweight Championship	Co-produced with MCW Pro Wrestling	
December 14	Future of Honor	MCW Arena	Joppa, Maryland	Rhett Titus (c) vs. Jonathan Gresham for the MCW Heavyweight Championship	Co-produced with MCW Pro Wrestling	
(c) – refers to the champion(s) heading into the match

=== 2023 ===
Date	Event	Venue	Location	Main event	Notes	Ref
January 18 (aired January 26)	Jay Briscoe Celebration of Life	Save Mart Center	Fresno, California	Claudio Castagnoli (c) vs. Christopher Daniels for the ROH World Championship		
(c) – refers to the champion(s) heading into the match

=== 2024 ===
Date	Event	Venue	Location	Main event	Notes	Ref
December 21 (aired December 26)	Boxing Day Brawl	Hammerstein Ballroom	New York City, New York	Komander (with Alex Abrahantes) (c) vs. Johnny TV for the ROH World Television Championship		
(c) – refers to the champion(s) heading into the match

=== 2025 ===
Date	Event	Venue	Location	Main event	Notes	Ref
January 31 – February 3 (aired February 13)	Chris Jericho's Rock 'N' Wrestling Rager at Sea	Norwegian Pearl	Miami, Florida to Puerto Plata, Dominican Republic	Komander (c) vs. Nick Wayne for the ROH World Television Championship		
June 18 (aired June 26)	Global Wars Mexico	Arena Mexico	Mexico City, Mexico	Lee Moriarty (with Carlie Bravo, Shane Taylor and Shawn Dean) vs. Blue Panther	Co-produced with Consejo Mundial de Lucha Libre	
November 15 (aired November 28)	Black Friday	Erie Insurance Arena	Erie, Pennsylvania	Komander vs. Mansoor		
December 13 and 17 (aired December 18)	Global Wars United Kingdom	Utilita Arena Cardiff (1st taping); Co-op Live (2nd taping)	Cardiff, Wales (1st taping); Manchester, England (2nd taping)	Wheeler Yuta vs. Nigel McGuinness		
December 20 (aired December 26)	Boxing Day Brawl	Hammerstein Ballroom	New York City, New York	Lee Moriarty (c) vs. Komander for the ROH Pure Championship		
(c) – refers to the champion(s) heading into the match

=== 2026 ===
Date	Event	Venue	Location	Main event	Notes	Ref
January 31 (aired February 5)	ROH x Metroplex Global Wars	Esports Stadium Arlington	Arlington, Texas	Deonna Purrazzo, Maya World, and Hyan vs. M.I.T. (Athena, Billie Starkz, and Diamanté)	Co-produced with Metroplex Wrestling	
May 9 (aired May 14)	Supercard Showdown	SoFi Center	Palm Beach Gardens, Florida	Bandido [c] vs. Action Andretti in an ROH World Championship Proving Ground match		
June 10–11 (aired June 18 and 26)	ROH x CMLL x Stardom Global Wars	Andrew J. Brady Music Center	Cincinnati, Ohio	Mike Bailey, Místico, and The Outrunners (Turbo Floyd and Truth Magnum) vs. RPG Vice (Rocky Romero and Trent Beretta) and The Lethal Twist (Jay Lethal and Blake Christian) in an eight-man tag team match	Co-produced with Consejo Mundial de Lucha Libre and World Wonder Ring Stardom	
June 10–11 (aired June 18 and 26)	ROH x CMLL x Stardom Global Wars	Andrew J. Brady Music Center	Cincinnati, Ohio	AR Fox (c) vs. Lio Rush vs. Action Andretti in a three way match for the ROH World Television Championship	Co-produced with Consejo Mundial de Lucha Libre and World Wonder Ring Stardom	
July 16, 2026 (aired July 21, 2026)	Beantown Beatdown	MGM Music Hall at Fenway	Boston, Massachusetts	Mark Davis (c) vs. Dezmond Xavier for the AEW National Championship		
August 4 (aired August 13)	Global Wars Mexico	Arena Mexico	Mexico City, Mexico	Kyle Fletcher vs. Mascara Dorada	Co-produced with Consejo Mundial de Lucha Libre	
August 5 (aired June 18 and 26)	Global Wars Mexico	Arena Mexico	Mexico City, Mexico	Hikaru Shida, Marina Shafir, and Skye Blue vs. Hyan, Maya World, and Thunder Rosa in a six-woman tag team match	Co-produced with Consejo Mundial de Lucha Libre	
August 19, 2026 (aired August 20)	Duel to the Death Before Dishonor	Chesapeake Employers Insurance Arena	Baltimore, Maryland	Marina Shafir and Skye Blue vs. Red Velvet and Zayda Steel (w/Christopher Daniels) in a tornado tag team match		
(c) – refers to the champion(s) heading into the match

== Upcoming shows ==
=== 2026 ===
Date	Event	Venue	Location	Main event	Notes	Ref
(c) – refers to the champion(s) heading into the match

== See also ==
- List of Ring of Honor pay-per-view and livestreaming events
- Category:Ring of Honor pay-per-view and livestreaming events
- Category:Ring of Honor pay-per-view and livestreaming events by year
- List of Ring of Honor tournaments
