= Severance Hall =

Concert hall in Cleveland, Ohio, US

Severance Music Center
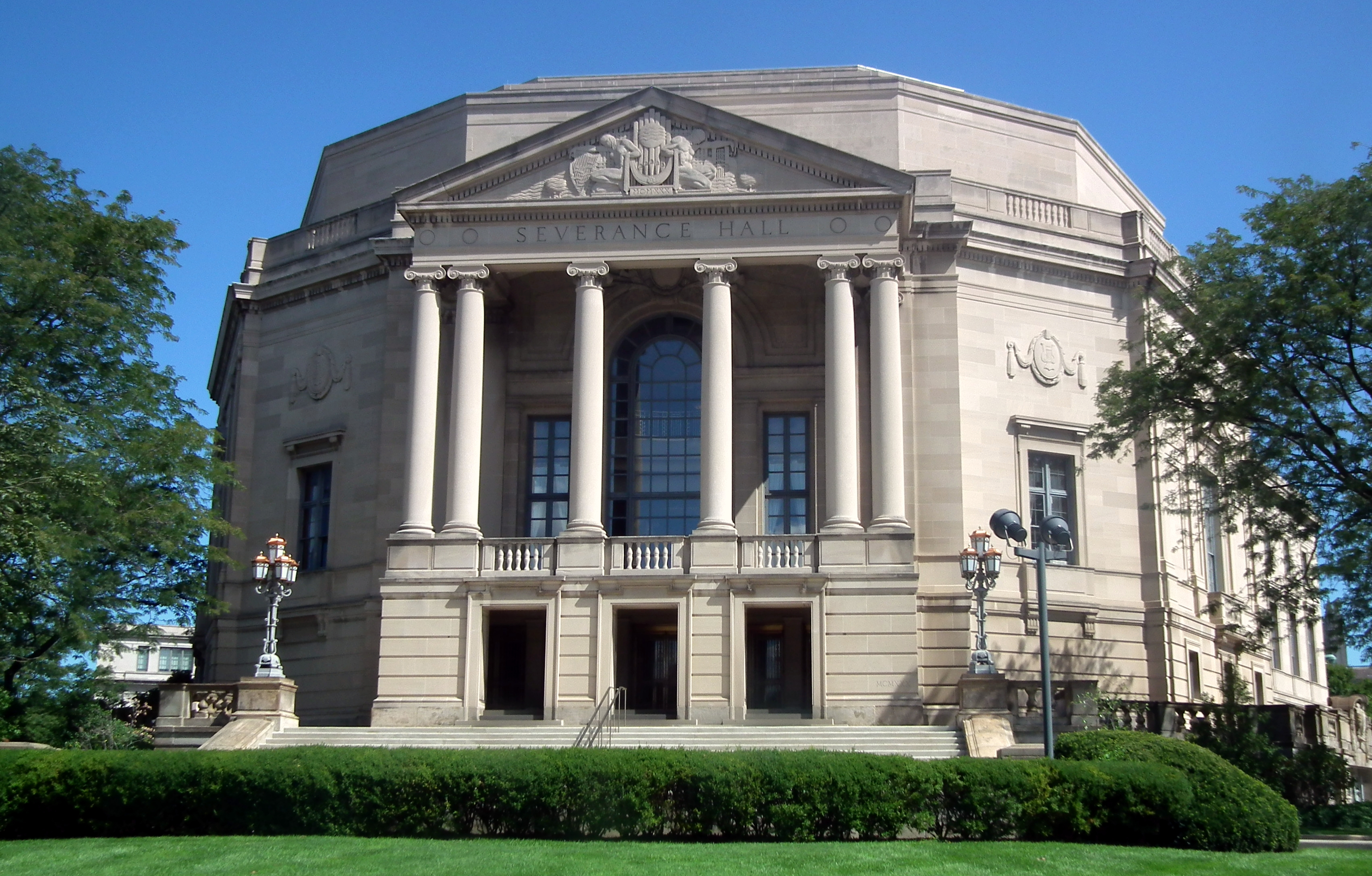
- Interactive map of Severance Music Center
- Address: 11001 Euclid Avenue; Cleveland, Ohio; United States
- Coordinates: 41°30′23″N 81°36′34″W
- Owner: Musical Arts Association
- Operator: Cleveland Orchestra
- Capacity: Concert hall: 2,000; Reinberger Chamber Hall: 402

Construction
- Opened: February 5, 1931
- Reopened: 2000
- Architect: Walker and Weeks

Website
- clevelandorchestra.com

Severance Hall, also known as Severance Music Center, is a concert hall in the University Circle neighborhood of Cleveland, Ohio, home to the Cleveland Orchestra. Opened in 1931 to give the orchestra a permanent home, the building is named for patrons John L. Severance and his wife, Elisabeth Huntingdon DeWitt Severance. It is listed on the National Register of Historic Places as part of Cleveland's Wade Park District.

In addition to serving as the Cleveland Orchestra's home and as a commencement site for Case Western Reserve University, Severance Hall is available to rent for concerts, weddings, corporate events, and receptions. On Severance Hall's ground floor is Reinberger Chamber Hall, a separate 402-seat auditorium that is frequently used for more intimate performances and pre-concert lectures.

== History ==
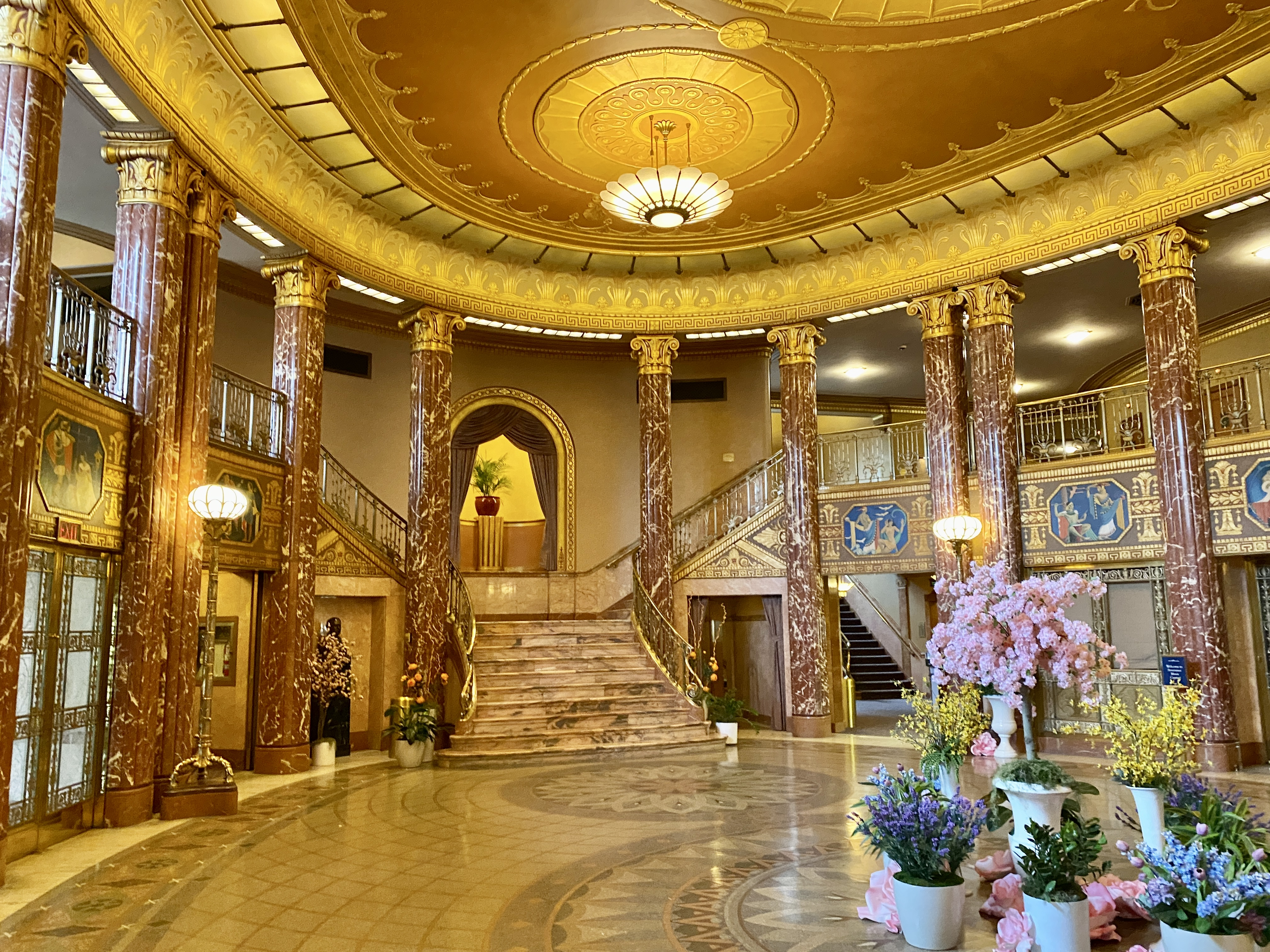
Grand Foyer

Founded in 1918, the Cleveland Orchestra first performed at Grays Armory in downtown Cleveland and moved to the Masonic Auditorium for concerts during the 1920s. But both buildings also hosted other types of events that occasionally created scheduling conflicts for the orchestra, including, most famously, twice when the ensemble had to find an alternate location because of a poultry exhibition. The orchestra's administration soon came to realize the advantages that having a permanent concert hall would bring to the ensemble's performances, rehearsals, and radio broadcasts.

After encouragement from Cleveland Orchestra founder Adella Prentiss Hughes and music director Nikolai Sokoloff, plans for Severance Hall began to emerge based on a plot of land offered by Western Reserve University (now Case Western Reserve University) at a leasing cost of $1.00 per year and potential funds contributed by the general public and local philanthropists. During a gala concert celebrating the orchestra's tenth anniversary, Dudley Blossom, an early benefactor, announced that John L. Severance, president of the Musical Arts Association, and his wife, Elisabeth, had pledged $1 million to the construction of a new hall. In support of an associated fundraising campaign, Blossom and his wife donated $750,000 the following day. Though Elisabeth Severance died in 1929, John Severance was determined to see the project through to its completion and intended for the concert hall to serve as a de facto memorial to his late wife. Despite a collapse of the United States’ economy in 1929, the groundbreaking for Severance Hall was held on November 14, 1929, and Severance's contribution eventually ballooned to more than $2.6 million. The concert hall was designed by the Cleveland firm of Walker & Weeks, which had also built Cleveland's Federal Reserve Bank and Public Library. Severance Hall opened on February 5, 1931, hosting a gala concert broadcast live across the radio to mark the occasion.

=== Renovations ===
As the use of taxis and chauffeured vehicles declined, Severance Hall's tiled drive-through entrance was closed in 1970. A dining area was created in the resulting space. Later, one of the access corridors on the ground floor was converted into a dressing room for female orchestra members (harpist Alice Chalifoux had used her instrument case to dress in the late 1930s and early 1940s, when she was one of the few women in the ensemble).

Beginning in 1998, Severance Hall underwent an extensive two-year, $36 million restoration and expansion led by architect David M. Schwarz. The renovated building reopened in January 2000, winning a National Preservation Honor Award. The most significant aesthetic change was the replacement of the “Szell Shell” with a new shell that combined the acoustics of the old model with a decorative style in harmony with the rest of the hall. The stage included a place for the relocation of the orchestra's newly-restored Ernest M. Skinner organ. The project also created a street-level lobby, a new restaurant, and additional offices for the orchestra's administrative staff.

On September 30, 2021, the Cleveland Orchestra and Musical Arts Association announced that it would rename the venue Severance Music Center.

== Architecture ==
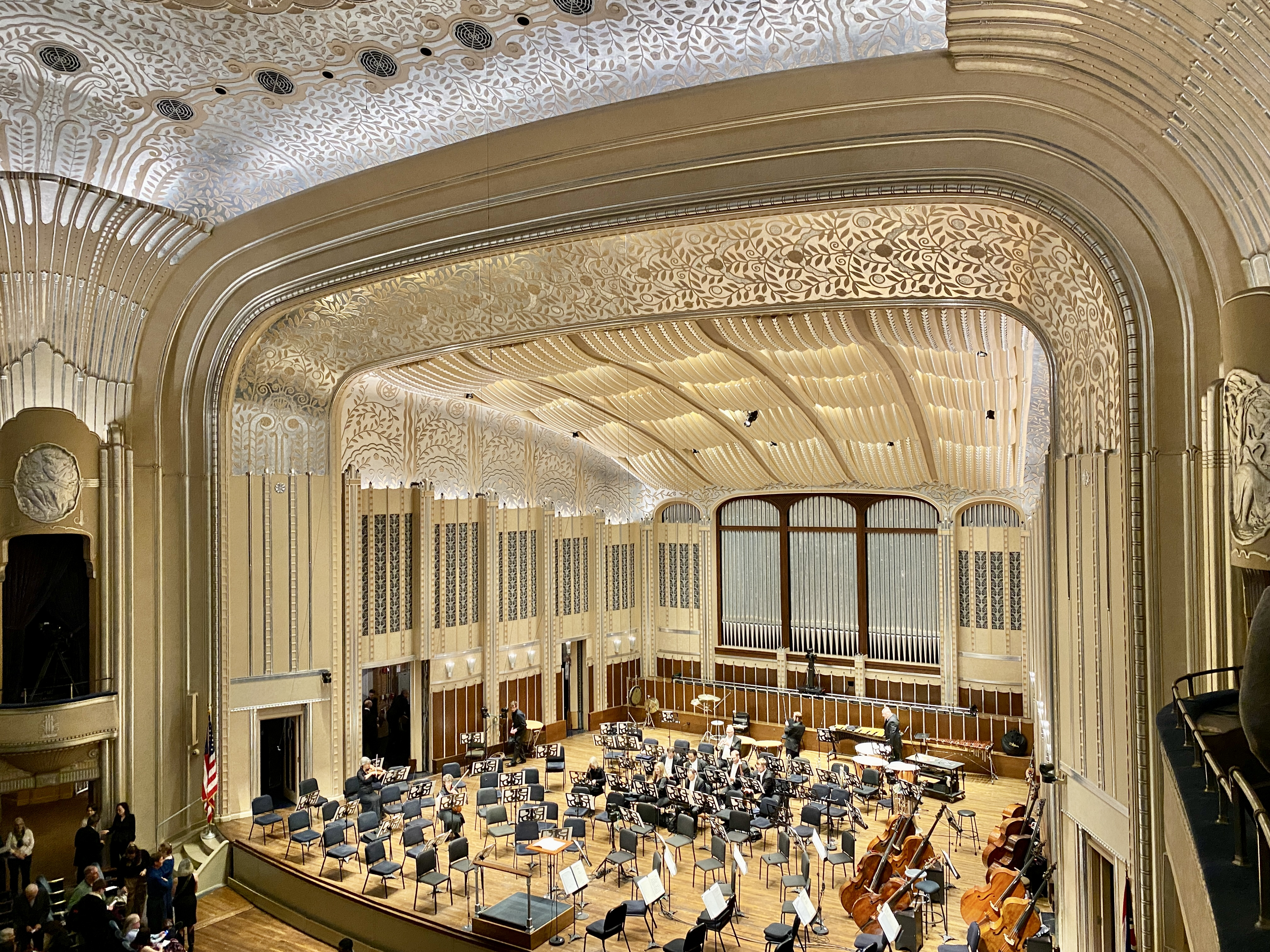
Concert stage of Severance Hall

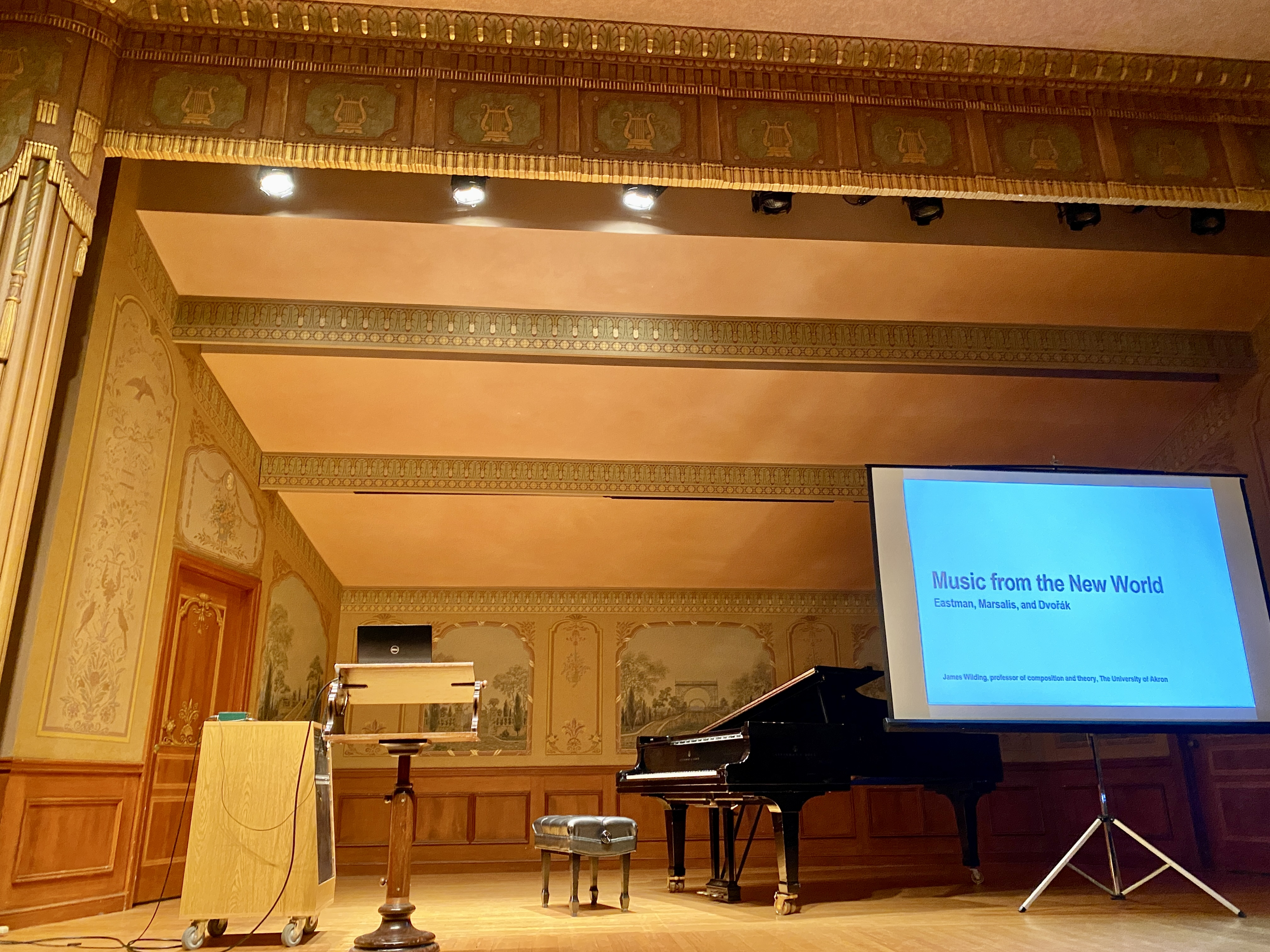
Stage of Reinberger Chamber Hall

Designed by Cleveland firm Walker and Weeks, Severance Music Center is located at the intersection of Euclid Avenue and East Boulevard. The front entrance features a grand lobby in the form of a domed rotunda, with the main auditorium and various service spaces spread out in a conjoined fan. The building's exterior was designed to complement the nearby Cleveland Museum of Art, featuring a neoclassical portico and an Art Deco relief by New York sculptor Henry Hering.

The interior of Severance Hall features a variety of architectural styles, including Art Deco and elements of Egyptian Revival. The Grand Foyer is surrounded by marble columns and decorated with papyrus and lotus flower patterns that are used in a number of places. The main concert hall features a silvery aluminum leaf ceiling with designs based on 18th-century English point lace.

== Acoustics ==
Shortly after the opening of Severance Hall, several acoustic problems were noted. These were attributed to the use of velvet curtains in audience boxes, thick carpet across much of the hall, and a large, sound-absorbing fly space located above the stage. In addition, removable shells created for the orchestra were constructed of materials that didn't reflect sound. Finally, the 6,025-pipe Ernest M. Skinner organ could be heard, but its positioning outside the auditorium itself was experimental and limited the options for addressing the auditorium's dry acoustics.

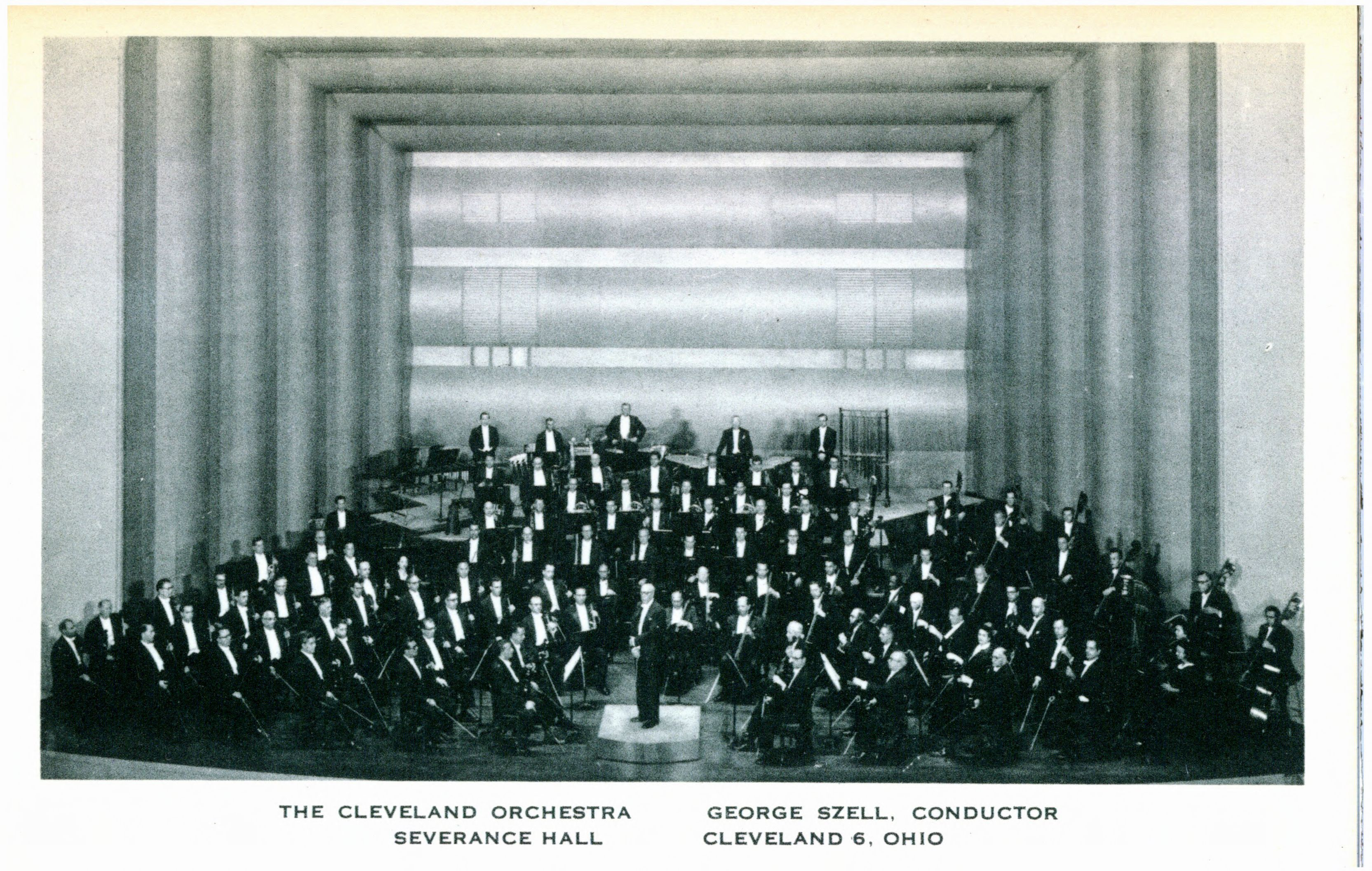
"The Szell Shell" photographed at the end of construction in 1958

In 1958, at the prompting of music director George Szell, an acoustical redesign of the hall was undertaken. To make the auditorium more resonant, the original proscenium and blue velvet curtains were removed and the use of carpet was reduced to a minimum. On the stage, a permanent acoustical shell was built — affectionately known as “The Szell Shell” — which consisted of thick wooden walls formed in a series of convex curves. To make the walls less absorbent and more reflective of sound, they were filled with sand. The result was a more vibrant-sounding space which complemented the orchestra's tone under Szell's direction.

Visually, though, the new Modernist stage clashed with the elegant Art Deco design of the concert hall. In addition, the organ's pipe chambers were effectively sealed off from the auditorium by the new shell — rendering the organ non-functional unless its sound was transmitted into the auditorium through microphones and speakers.

== Use in film ==
Severance Hall was featured in the 1997 Harrison Ford film Air Force One. The scene during the opening credits shows a night-time military raid on the presidential palace of the leader of Kazakhstan. Severance Hall's roof, with additional architectural elements added as set-dressing, was chosen to depict the palace.

A segment of the Cirque du Soleil film, The Journey of Man, was filmed in the main lobby. Shot in 1999 in IMAX, the segment Banquine, utilized the 40 foot ceilings in the Bogomolny-Kozerefski Grand Foyer.

== See also ==
- List of concert halls
