= John L. Severance =

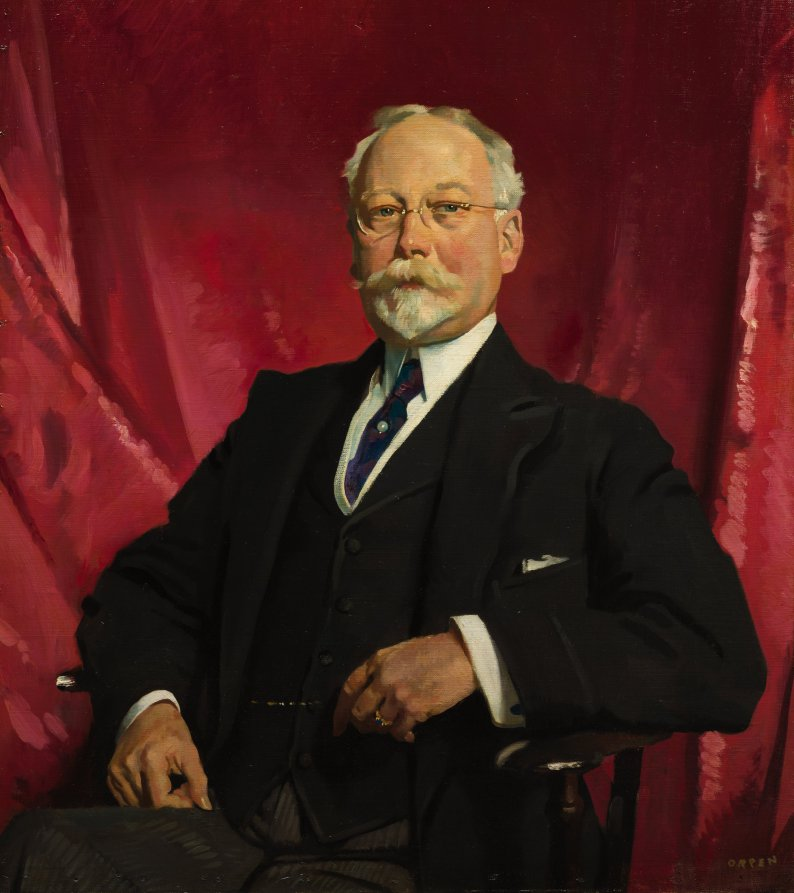
- Portrait by William Orpen, 1922, Cleveland Museum of Art
- Born: John Long Severance; 8 May 1863; Cleveland, Ohio, US
- Died: 16 January 1936 (aged 72)
- Education: Oberlin College
- Occupation: Businessman
- Spouse: Elisabeth Huntington DeWitt
- Parent(s): Louis Severance; Fannie Buckingham Benedict

John Long Severance (May 8, 1863 – January 16, 1936) was a businessman and philanthropist in Cleveland, Ohio.

== Biography ==
He was born in Cleveland, Ohio to Louis Severance (1838–1913) and Fannie Buckingham Benedict (1839–1874). Louis was a founding member of the Standard Oil Trust and the first treasurer of Standard Oil, which was established in 1870 by John D. Rockefeller and Henry Flagler.

Shortly after John L. Severance graduated from Oberlin College in 1885, he began working for the Standard Oil Co. in Cleveland. He married Elisabeth Huntingdon DeWitt (1865–1929) in 1891.

When Severance left Standard Oil in 1892, he joined the Cleveland Linseed Oil Company, which specialized in paint and varnish, and would go on to found the American Linseed Oil Company in 1899. Two years later, Severance became president of Colonial Salt Co., and continued to expand his business activities in Cleveland and Youngstown. Severance's wealth made him instrumental in the support of The Cleveland Orchestra during its creation by Adella Prentiss Hughes and Nikolai Sokoloff. Beginning in 1921, Severance would serve as president of the Musical Arts Association, the board of trustees that oversaw the orchestra's founding – a collaboration that continues to this day. He also became president of the Cleveland Museum of Art in 1926, stating "things that are beautiful and also helpful to the cultural life of a community" were an "outstanding pleasure" in his life. At the time of his death, in 1936, Severance would leave the museum nearly $3 million worth of artwork for its collection.

As The Cleveland Orchestra gained notoriety during its early years under Hughes's and Sokoloff's leadership, it became apparent that the ensemble was in desperate need of a permanent concert hall: the orchestra had been playing at Grays Armory, Masonic Hall, and Public Hall in downtown Cleveland. Scheduling performances at the three venues was sometimes difficult and the orchestra had to deal with a variety of conflicts, including the occasional poultry show. The Musical Arts Association also recognized that many of its subscribers lived in Cleveland's University Circle area. Although Severance and other benefactors, including Dudley Blossom, had been helping to cover deficits from the orchestra's first few seasons, the breakthrough came during a gala concert at Public Hall on December 11, 1928, the ten-year anniversary of the orchestra's first performance. Before intermission, Blossom walked on stage and announced that John and Elisabeth Severance had pledged $1 million toward the construction of a new concert hall. The next day, Blossom and his wife, Elisabeth, pledged $750,000.

A month later, Elisabeth Severance died after sustaining a stroke on the day before her 64th birthday. As a result, the new concert hall became John Severance's de facto memorial to his late wife. Despite the stock market crash of October 29, 1929, known as “Black Tuesday,” Severance remained committed to seeing the project through to its completion: his original $1 million pledge eventually ballooned to more than $2.6 million. On November 14, 1929, Severance made the ceremonial first push of the shovel during the concert hall's groundbreaking at the corner of Euclid Avenue and East Boulevard. Composer, conductor, and piano virtuoso Sergei Rachmaninoff, who had given a recital the night before at Public Hall, shared Severance's box at Severance Hall's opening-night concert on February 5, 1931. Severance continued to serve as president of the Musical Arts Association into the tenure of the orchestra's second music director, Artur Rodzinski. On January 16, 1936, Severance died at the age of 72 and was buried in Cleveland's Lakeview Cemetery, his memory living on in the hall that bears his name.
