= Nikolai Sokoloff =

American conductor (1886–1965)

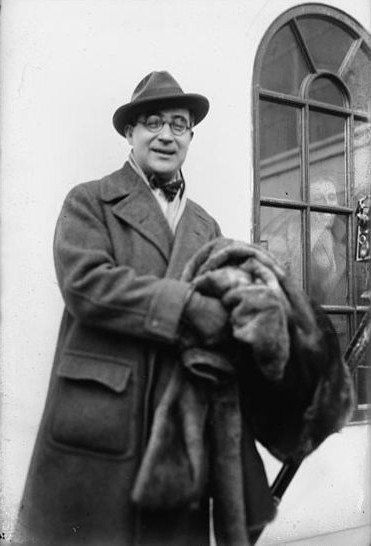
Nikolai Sokoloff

Nikolai Grigoryevich Sokoloff (28 May 1886 – 25 September 1965) was a Russian and American conductor and violinist.

== Biography ==
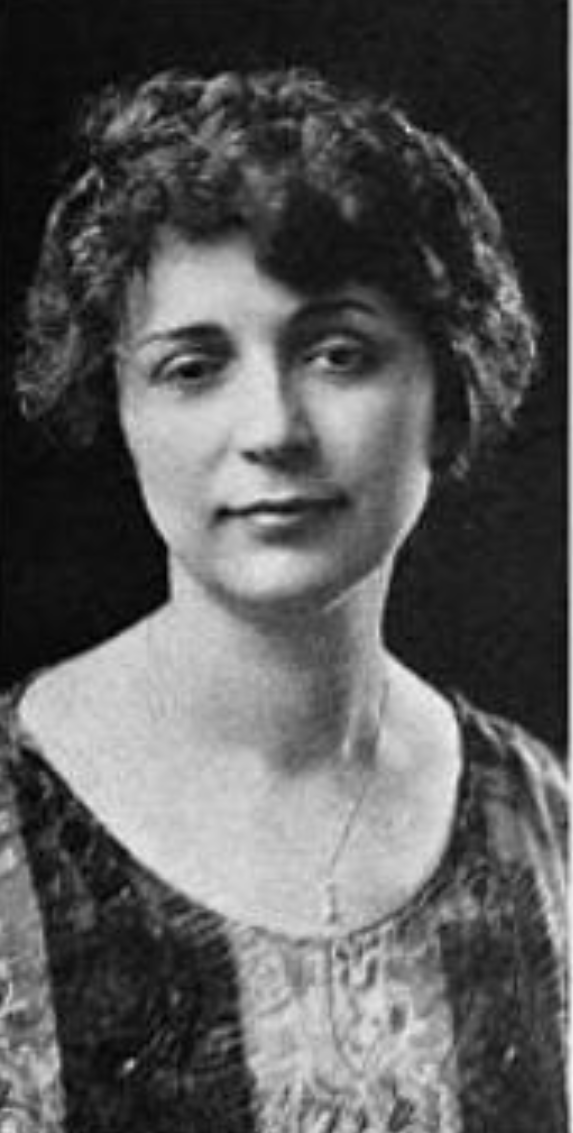
Ruth Haller Ottaway

External audio
- You may hear Nikolai Sokoloff performing the overture to Otto Nicolai's opera The Merry Wives of Windsor with the Cleveland Orchestra in 1927 Here on archive.org

Sokoloff was born in Kiev to a Jewish family that emigrated to the United States when he was 13 years old. He studied music at Yale University under Charles Martin Loeffler. After studying at Yale University, he gave concerts in France and England as a violinist. From 1916 to 1917 he was musical director of the San Francisco People's Philharmonic Orchestra, where he insisted on including women in his orchestra and paying them the same salaries as men received. Before being appointed as the first music director of Cleveland Orchestra, Sokoloff served as a violinist in the Boston Symphony Orchestra and as concertmaster in the Russian Symphony Orchestra, which at the time was based in New York. He played recitals for American troops in Europe during World War I, and later met Adella Prentiss Hughes in New York City, who encouraged him to play a recital in Cleveland in February 1918. After Hughes heard Sokoloff speaking about the need for public school children to be exposed to professional orchestras, she encouraged him to move to Cleveland. At first, his role was to survey music education within Cleveland's public schools. Soon, however, Hughes and Sokoloff, along with John L. Severance, vice-president of the Musical Arts Association (founded by Hughes in 1915), sought to establish a permanent orchestra in Cleveland.

As a result, the Cleveland Symphony Orchestra (later renamed the Cleveland Orchestra) was formed and the ensemble gave its first concert on December 11, 1918, at Cleveland's Grays Armory. Sokoloff served as the orchestra's music director for another 14 years, until his departure in 1932. During his tenure in Cleveland, Sokoloff expanded both the number of musicians in the Orchestra and the number of programs in its season concert series; he also took the Orchestra on tours across the country. Additionally, Sokoloff led the orchestra in its first recording project — a 1924 performance of Tchaikovsky’s 1812 Overture, on the Brunswick Label.

In the Orchestra’s second season, the ensemble moved to the Masonic Auditorium, which remained its home until the completion of Severance Hall in 1931. Under Sokoloff’s musical leadership, the city had an established orchestra of its own. Although the end of Sokoloff’s time in Cleveland was spoiled by negative press about his personality, conducting style, and lack of cordiality, he made a point to depart on a positive note. When Sokoloff was asked if he “had anything to say to Cleveland before leaving,” Sokoloff remarked, “Tell them good luck, and that I’ve had a good time."

Between 1935 and 1938 he directed the Federal Music Project, a New Deal program that employed musicians to educate the public about music. From 1938 to 1941 he directed the Seattle Symphony Orchestra and in 1941 founded the Chamber Music Society (now known as the La Jolla Music Society) in La Jolla, California.

In 1937 Nikolai married Ruth Haller Ottaway, second wife of Elmer James Ottaway, publisher of Port Huron Record newspaper, who died in 1934. Ruth Haller Ottaway is mother of James Haller Ottaway, founder of Ottaway Newspapers-Radio Inc that published many local newspapers and was purchased by Dow Jones Inc in 1970.

== Notable recording premieres ==
- Rachmaninoff, Symphony No. 2, Cleveland Orchestra, 1928

== Bibliography ==
- Gibbs, Jason (Fall 2002). "The Best Music at the Lowest Price: People's Music in San Francisco". Music Library Association Northern California Chapter. 17 (1).
- NAOSMM (28 November 2006). "Famous People with a Cleveland Connection". National Association of Scientific Materials. Archived from the original on 10 May 2009.
- Rosenberg, Donald. The Cleveland Orchestra Story: "Second to None." Cleveland: Gray & Company, 2000.
