= Adella Prentiss Hughes =

American pianist and impresario (1869–1950)

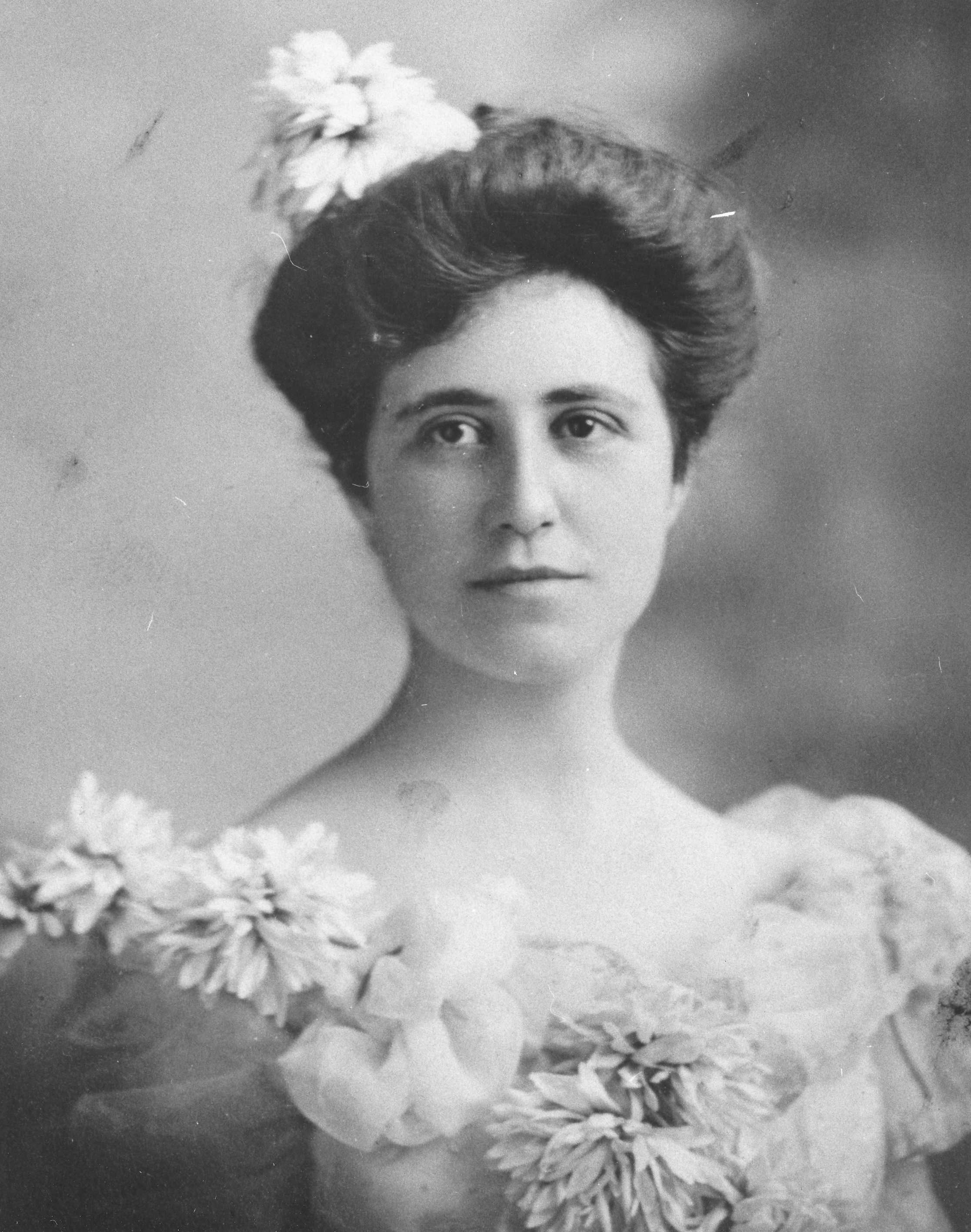
Adella Prentiss Hughes as a student at Vassar College; photographer unknown, use courtesy of The Cleveland Orchestra Archives

Adella Prentiss Hughes (November 29, 1869 – August 23, 1950) was an American pianist and impresario. She was based in Cleveland, Ohio. She is best known for founding The Cleveland Orchestra.

== Early life ==
Born in Cleveland in 1869, Adella Prentiss Hughes had deep connections that traced back to the city's origin. Her paternal grandfather, Moses Warren (for whom the Warren and Warrensville areas are named), was part of Moses Cleaveland’s original survey team along the Cuyahoga River, and her maternal grandparents were friends of other pioneering families in the area, most notably the Severances. Hughes began taking piano lessons at a young age, establishing a life-long relationship with music. After attending Miss Fisher’s School for Girls (today known as Hathaway Brown), she enrolled at Vassar College, where some of her early experiences in leadership occurred.

While majoring in music at Vassar, Hughes was part of the glee club, founded the banjo club, and organized events for both groups. These were important steps in her career in arts management. At Vassar, Hughes also became friends with Elisabeth Rockefeller and their relationship, based on a shared love of music, would lead to more important connections down the road. Hughes graduated in 1890 with the distinction of Phi Beta Kappa and set out with her mother on a tour of Europe. Although a professor with whom Hughes was close, Lucy M. Salmon, encouraged her to pursue a Ph.D. in history, Hughes instead sought to further her musical enrichment by engaging in a type of “coming of age” journey mirroring Mozart’s Great Western Tour. She and her mother traveled to Europe's renowned concert halls, and spent a lengthy period in Berlin. While there, Hughes continued to study piano before returning to the United States in 1891. During the ensuing decade, she worked as a professional accompanist and became a member of Cleveland's Fortnightly Music Club.

== Career ==
In 1898, Hughes organized her first professional engagement as a concert manager with a local performance of Liza Lehmann’s song-cycle In a Persian Garden, which she took “on tour” to Toledo, Columbus, Detroit, Ann Arbor, and Chicago. During this time, Hughes saw several orchestras fail in Cleveland — in most cases due to a lack of funding. As early as 1901, Hughes began inviting orchestras to perform concerts in the area, beginning with the Pittsburgh Symphony Orchestra in a series sponsored by the Fortnightly Music Club. Three years later, Adella Prentiss married singer Felix Hughes, whom she’d met during his visit to the city. In 1904, she brought Richard Strauss to Cleveland as guest-conductor with the Pittsburgh Symphony Orchestra, an engagement which set in motion more than a decade of performances in a series known as the Symphony Orchestra Concerts, featuring top conductors paired with top orchestras, including Leopold Stokowski with the Cincinnati Orchestra and Gustav Mahler with the New York Philharmonic, along with the Boston Symphony Orchestra and the Chicago Symphony Orchestra.

In 1912, she assisted a singing teacher, Almeda Adams, in founding the Cleveland Music School Settlement for children. By the 1914–1915 season, Hughes received word of a possible visit to Cleveland by Sergei Diaghilev’s Ballets Russes and called a meeting of wealthy businessmen to lobby for the creation of an organization to secure funding and support for musical presentations — establishing the Musical Arts Association in the summer of 1915.

By the following spring, Clevelanders were treated to several performances of Ballets Russes at the Hippodrome Theatre. Dhiagilev’s troupe performed nearly a dozen works, including Igor Stravinsky’s The Firebird and Petrushka conducted by Ernest Ansermet. Buoyed by a positive response, Hughes assembled a presentation of Richard Wagner’s opera Siegfried to be led by Artur Bodanzky, conductor of the Metropolitan Opera, at League Park, then-home of the Cleveland Indians, on June 19, 1916. The program drew a large crowd and helped inspire Hughes to begin establishing a permanent orchestra for Cleveland.

After meeting Hughes in New York, conductor and violinist Nikolai Sokoloff agreed to visit Cleveland to survey the level of music education in local public schools. Despite roadblocks caused by World War I and an outbreak of Influenza, Sokoloff, Hughes, music critic Archie Bell, and Father John Powers of St. Ann’s Parish in Cleveland Heights signed a contract for a concert by the newly-formed Cleveland Symphony Orchestra to be performed on December 11, 1918. Over the next fifteen seasons, Hughes worked as the Orchestra’s general manager.

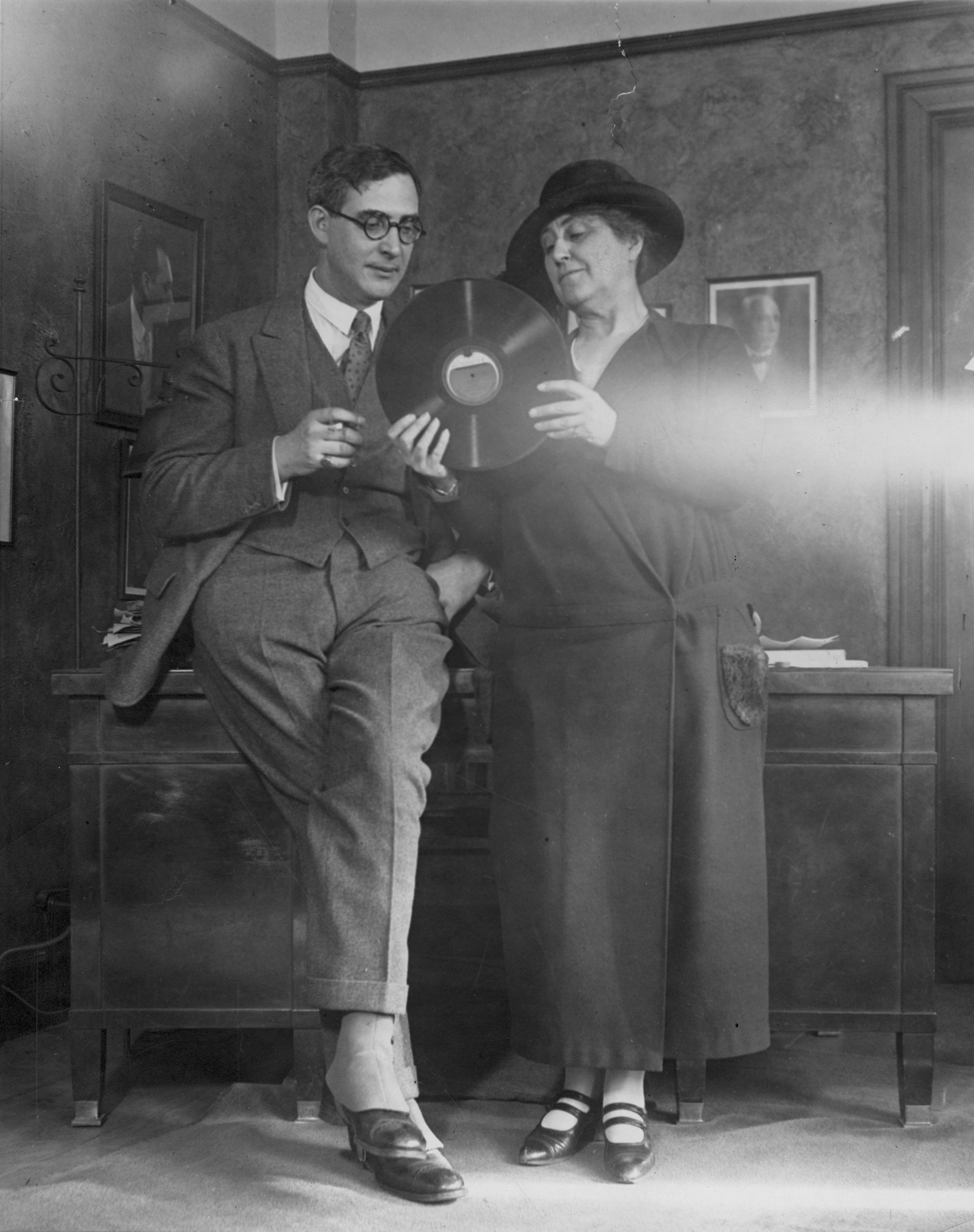
Adella inspecting The Cleveland Orchestra's first recording with Music Director Nikolai Sokoloff; photo by Wide World Photos, use courtesy of The Cleveland Orchestra Archives

Driven by Sokoloff’s direction and Hughes’s determination, the Orchestra expanded in programming and size: Its first education concert for children was performed in 1921 and Hughes founded the Women’s Committee of The Cleveland Orchestra, which focused on the musical growth of local children and collaborated with education consultant Lillian Baldwin, who helped implement the famed “Cleveland Plan” — a future model for national music education programs.

During the following seasons, the orchestra continued to achieve a number of professional milestones: a concert at the Hippodrome Theatre in New York (1921), tours across Ohio and Michigan, a first concert at Carnegie Hall (1922), and a first recording, of Tchaikovsky’s 1812 Overture, on the Brunswick label (1924). By the end of the decade, Hughes became preoccupied with the construction of a permanent home for the orchestra. For years, the ensemble's concerts had been performed at Grays Armory, Masonic Auditorium, and Public Hall. But now Hughes was soliciting funds from public guarantors and members of the Musical Arts Association to support the construction of a new hall for The Cleveland Orchestra. Eventually, in a surprise announcement at a concert in 1928, John L. Severance and his wife, Elisabeth, pledged $1 million toward the building.

On February 5, 1931, a gala concert was held on Severance Hall’s opening night. Two years later, Hughes retired from an official administrative position with the Musical Arts Association, though she continued to serve as a volunteer vice president and secretary — remaining an active voice in matters of the orchestra's future. Until her death on August 23, 1950, she was steadfastly committed to her original mission of educating and inspiring people from across the region — and around the world — through the power and passion of music.

Hughes was buried in Cleveland's Lake View Cemetery.
