= ROH Epic Encounter III =

2010 Ring of Honor event

Epic Encounter III
- Promotion: Ring of Honor
- Date: March 20, 2010
- City: Mississauga, Ontario, Canada
- Venue: International Centre
- Attendance: 800

Pay-per-view chronology
← Previous; Gold Rush	Next → From the Ashes

Epic Encounter event chronology
← Previous; Epic Encounter II	Next → Epic Encounter IV

Epic Encounter III was a professional wrestling pay-per-view event produced by Ring of Honor (ROH). It took place on March 20, 2010 from the International Centre in Mississauga, Ontario, Canada. Seven matches composed the card of the show. It was the third event in the Epic Encounter chronology.

== Production ==
=== Storylines ===
Epic Encounter III featured 10 different multiple professional wrestling matches that involved different wrestlers from pre-existing scripted feuds and storylines. Wrestlers were portrayed as either villains or heroes in the scripted events that built tension and culminated in a wrestling match.

The events main event is Davey Richards (with Shane Hagadorn) vs Kenny Omega.

== Results ==
No.	Results	Stipulations	Times
1^{D}	The Bravado Brothers (Harlem Bravado & Lance Bravado) defeated Mike Rollins & Rip Impact	Tag team match	—
2^{D}	Pee Wee defeated Michael Von Payton	Singles match	—
3^{D}	Bobby Dempsey defeated Danny Duggan and Hornet and Kevin Nemesis and Lou Crank and Rahim Ali and RJ City	Gauntlet match	5:21
4	The House of Truth (Christin Able & Josh Raymond) (with Truth Martini) defeated The Flatliners (Asylum & Matt Burns) via pinfall	Tag team match	11:48
5	Kevin Steen defeated Player Dos (w/ Player Uno) via pinfall	Singles match	10:33
6	Eddie Edwards (with Shane Hagadorn) (c) defeated Petey Williams via submission	Singles match for the ROH World Television Championship	15:23
7	Jay Briscoe, Rasche Brown, Tyler Black & Tyson Dux defeated Adam Pearce, Austin Aries, Kenny King & Rhett Titus via pinfall	Eight man tag team match	16:20
8	Colt Cabana defeated Steve Corino by disqualification	Singles match	11:11
9	Chris Hero (with Shane Hagadorn) defeated El Generico via TKO	Pick-6 Series match	20:05
10	Davey Richards (with Shane Hagadorn) defeated Kenny Omega via submission	Singles match	23:52
(c) / – the champion(s) heading into the match; D / – this was a dark match
