= ROH Chaos At The Cow Palace =

2007 Ring of Honor event

- Promotion: Ring of Honor
- Date: October 21, 2007
- City: San Francisco, California
- Venue: Cow Palace
- Attendance: 350

Pay-per-view chronology
← Previous; Survival of the Fittest	Next → Glory by Honor VI

On October 21, 2007 Ring Of Honor (ROH) Chaos At The Cow Palace took place at the Cow Palace in San Francisco California.

This was a Ring of Honor special event that took place on On October 21, 2007.

== Production ==
Other on-screen personnel
Role	Name
Commentators	Dave Prazak
Commentators	Lenny Leonard

=== Storylines ===
Chaos At The Cow Palace featured eight different professional wrestling matches that involved different wrestlers from pre-existing scripted feuds and storylines. Wrestlers were portrayed as either villains or heroes in the scripted events that built tension and culminated in a wrestling match involving.

== Results ==
No.	Results	Stipulations	Times
1	Chris Hero (with Larry Sweeney) defeated Human Tornado	Singles match	12:56
2	Roderick Strong (c) defeated Claudio Castagnoli	Singles match for the FIP Heavyweight Championship	13:31
3	Adam Pearce defeated Karl Anderson	Singles match	7:35
4	Brent Albright defeated Delirious	Grudge match	8:12
5	No Remorse Corps (Rocky Romero and Davey Richards) defeated Tony Kozina and TJ Perkins	Tag team match	10:38
6	The Age of the Fall (Necro Butcher and Jimmy Jacobs) defeated No Remorse Corpse (Rocky Romero and Davey Richards)	Singles match	12:13
7	Bryan Danielson defeated Austin Aries	Best of 3 Series Match	18:47
8	Nigel McGuinness (c) defeated Jay Briscoe	Singles match for the ROH World Championship	18:52
(c) / – the champion(s) heading into the match
