= Almeda C. Adams =

American musician, teacher and author

Almeda Adams
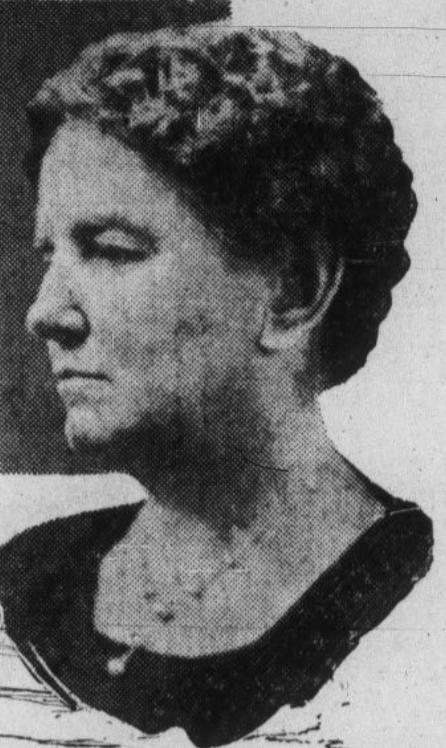
- Almeda C. Adams, from a 1927 newspaper
- Born: February 26, 1865; Meadville, Pennsylvania, US
- Died: September 8, 1949 (aged 84)
- Education: New England Conservatory

Almeda C. Adams (February 26, 1865 – September 8, 1949) was a musician, teacher, and author who, with the assistance of Adelle Prentiss Hughes, founded the Cleveland Music School Settlement.

== Biography ==
Adams was born on February 26, 1865, in Meadville, Pennsylvania to James Adams, an itinerant preacher, and Katherine Adams (née Ketchum). As an infant, Almeda lost her eyesight and was blind the rest of her life. Her family lived in many places in Ohio, and Almeda attended the State School for the Blind in Columbus, Ohio. She sold 2000 subscriptions to the Ladies Home Journal to earn a scholarship to the New England Conservatory of Music. After graduation, she taught for a period in Nebraska at Lincoln Normal University and Nebraska School for the Blind, eventually returned to New York city for further study, and finally settled in Cleveland, Ohio.

In Cleveland, Adams pursued many musical endeavors including teaching at several settlement houses. Inspired by the creation of music settlement houses in New York City and encouraged by her father, she approached Adella Prentiss Hughes, who founded The Cleveland Orchestra, for assistance in establishing a music settlement house in Cleveland. In 1912, Adams, with the assistance of Hughes, established the Cleveland Music School Settlement with a $1000 donation from the Fortnightly Musical Club and support from other notable Cleveland families. The Cleveland Music School Settlement, which continues to operate today as The Music Settlement, grew to include music instruction, music therapy, and other services at both its main location and several outreach sites. Adams was dedicated to making music instruction available to children and adults and focused on making lessons and other services accessible to underprivileged individuals. From its inception, The Cleveland Music Settlement School provided free and low-cost instruction to better serve the community.

Along with the establishment of the Cleveland Music School Settlement, Adams also directed the Schumann Society from 1918 to 1931, which was a choral group for working girls. Adams published Seeing Europe Through Sightless Eyes in 1929. In this book, Adams described her personal reactions to art she was able to experience in Europe either through the descriptions of the voice student she was chaperoning or through touch.

She continued to teach until 1948 and died a year later on September 8, 1949, at the age of 84. Adams was interred with her family in Lakeview Cemetery.
