= Memorial Hall (Plymouth, Massachusetts) =

Coordinates: 41°57′35.0″N 70°40′7.6″W

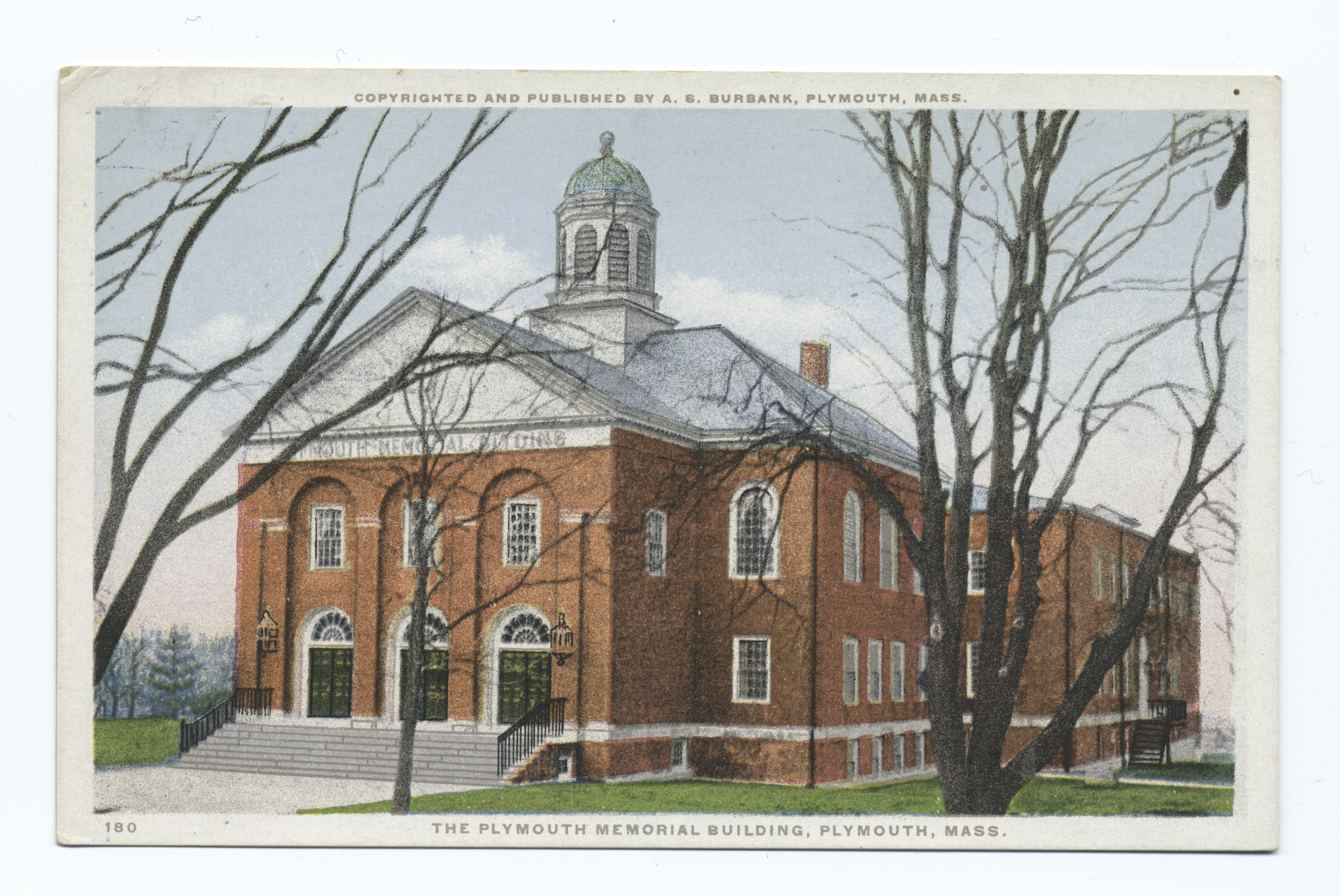
- Interactive map of Memorial Hall
- Location: 83 Court Street; Plymouth, Massachusetts
- Capacity: Main Auditorium: 2,550 seats

Construction
- Opened: 1926
- Renovated: 2004

Tenants
- Plymouth Philharmonic

Website
- www.memorialhall.com

Memorial Hall is a concert hall and general entertainment venue, located in Plymouth, Massachusetts.
