= International Centre =

The International Centre
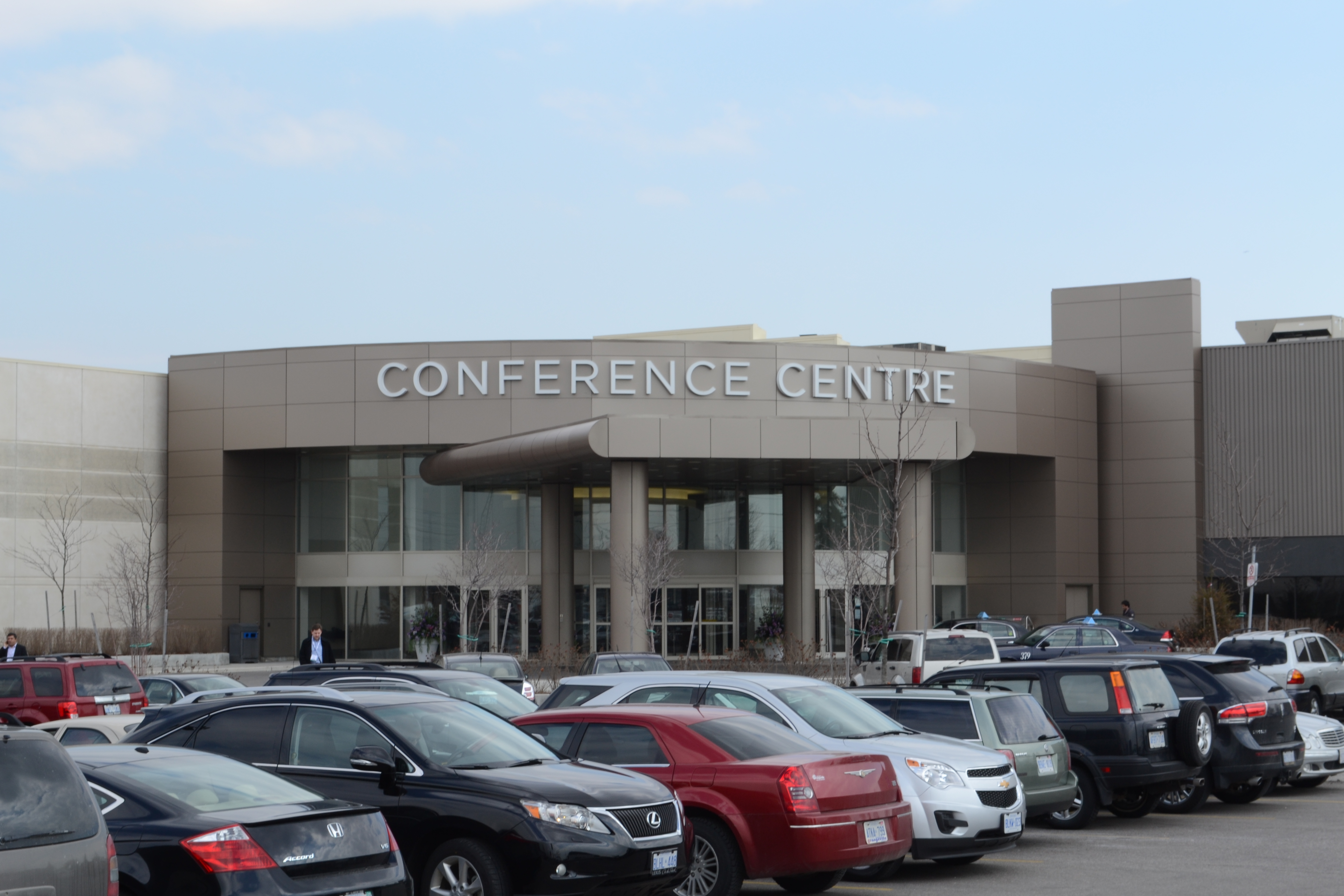

- Location outside Toronto
- Address: 6900 Airport Road
- Location: Mississauga, Ontario, Canada
- Coordinates: 43.703152°N 79.636745°W

Construction
- Opened: 1972; 54 years ago
- Renovated: 2002; 24 years ago

Website
- www.internationalcentre.com

The International Centre is a multi-purpose convention centre in Mississauga, Ontario, Canada, located near Toronto Pearson International Airport. The International Centre is privately owned and hosts over 450 shows and events each year.

== History ==
Opened in 1972, the centre's exhibit space nearly doubled from the original 260,000 square feet (24,000 m^{2}) following a major expansion and renovation in 2002. The centre now features over 548,000 square feet (50,900 m^{2}) of exhibit and meeting space and approximately one million square feet (93,000 m^{2}) floor area which includes exhibit, meeting, office and retail space.

The International Centre is closely linked to Canada's aviation history. During the 1950s, the site was the home of Orenda Engines Limited and was used in the development of the Iroquois jet engine for the Avro Arrow fighter aircraft. The site was purchased by a group of private investors from DeHavilland in 1971, which led to the development of its present use today, as a major multi-purpose facility.

The Canadian International AutoShow was held at the International Centre from 1974 to 1985.

== Images ==
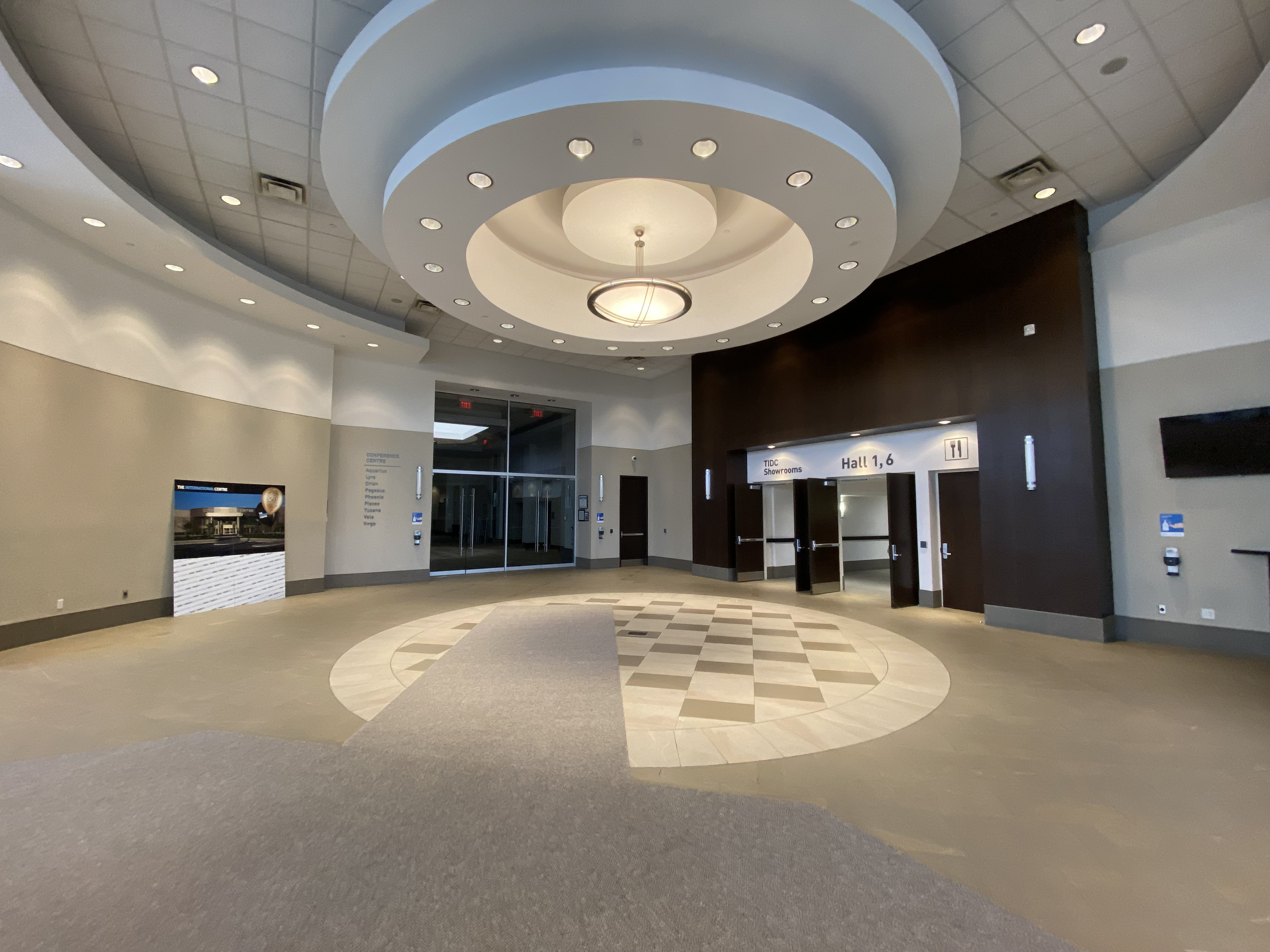
Entrance Lobby

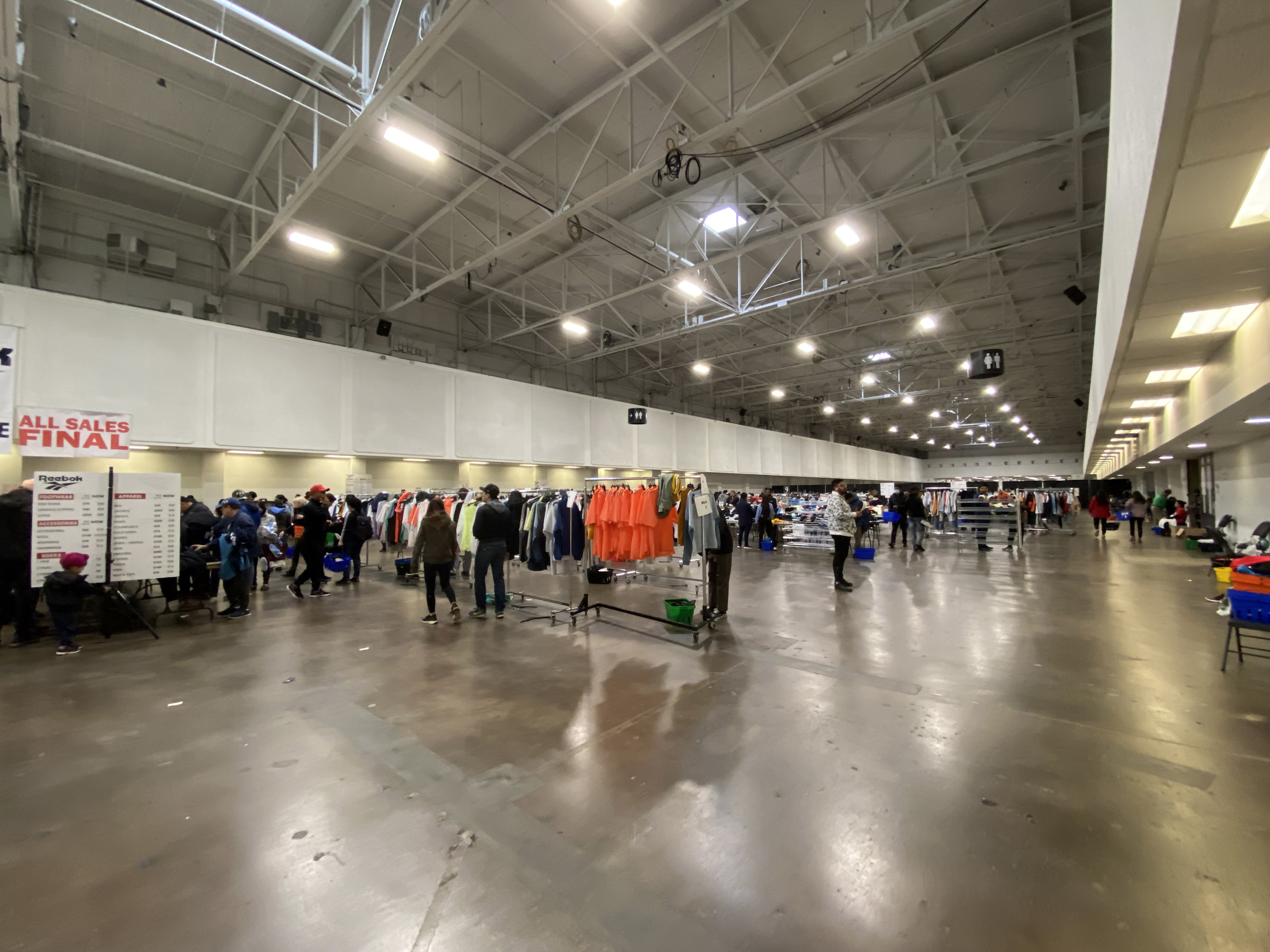
Hall 1 interior

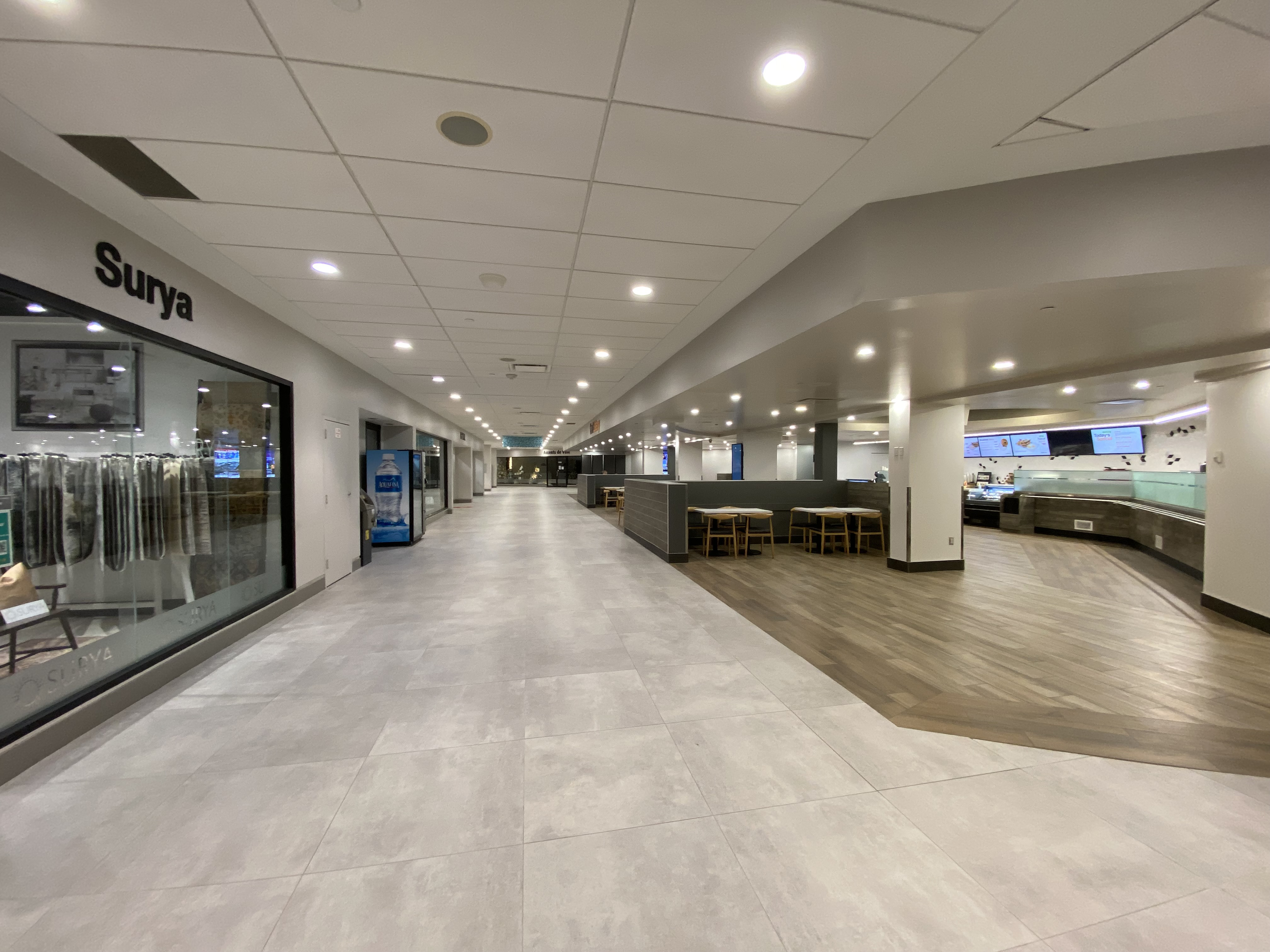
Toronto Interion Design Centre (TIDC) inside the centre

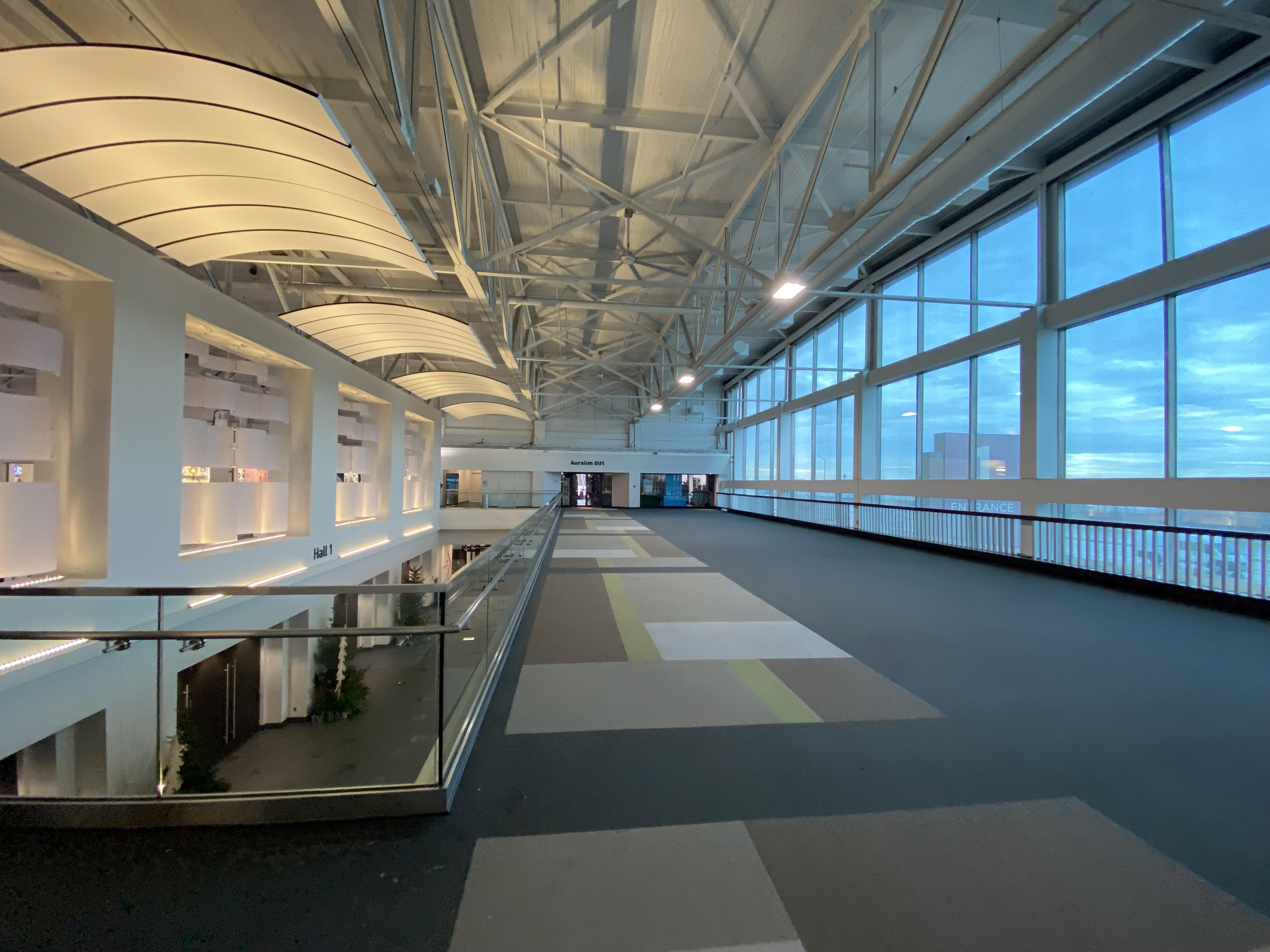
Level 2 Deck

== See also ==
- Enercare Centre
- Metro Toronto Convention Centre
- Toronto Congress Centre
