= Grays Armory =

- Cleveland Grays Armory Museum
- U.S. National Register of Historic Places
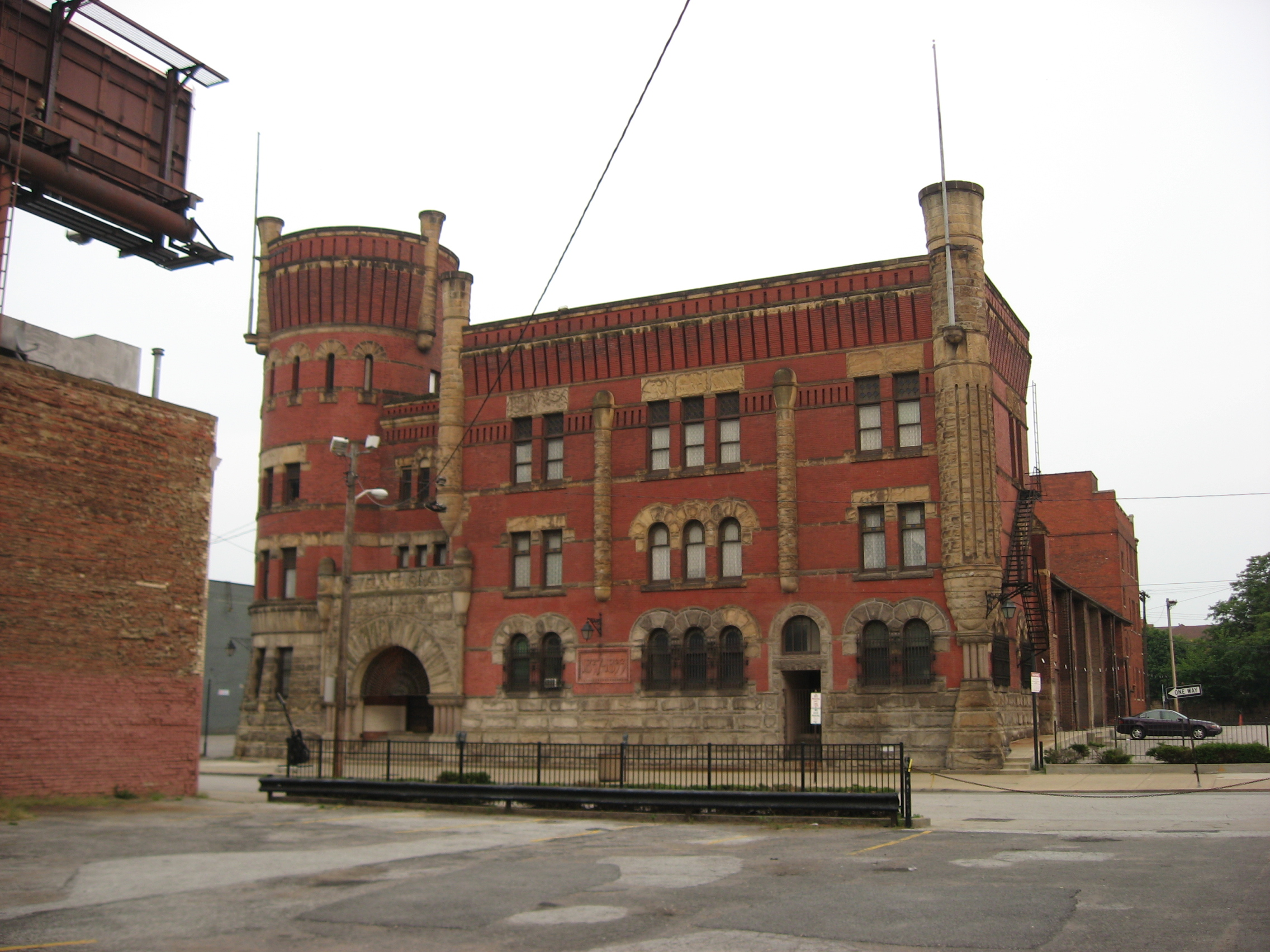
- Grays Armory

- Location within Cleveland Location within Ohio Location within the United States
- Location: 1234 Bolivar Rd., Cleveland, Ohio
- Coordinates: 41°29′56″N 81°40′56″W
- Area: 0.5 acres (0.20 ha)
- Built: 1894
- Architect: Bate, Fenimore C.
- Architectural style: Romanesque, Richardsonian Romanesque
- NRHP reference No.: 73001409
- Added to NRHP: March 28, 1973

Grays Armory is a historic building in Cleveland, Ohio. It was built by the Cleveland Grays, a private military company which was founded in 1837. This is one of the oldest standing buildings in downtown Cleveland located at 1234 Bolivar Rd.

== The Cleveland Grays ==
The Cleveland Grays is a social organization devoted to the promotion of patriotism and the preservation of the military heritage of Greater Cleveland. It was founded as a volunteer private military company at a time when the common or constitutional militia languished due to uninterest and neglect by state politicians.

The unit's original purpose was twofold: to provide assistance and support to the local law enforcement authorities of the time as well as to provide a first line of defense for the city in the event that the fighting in Canada's Rebellions of 1837 spilled over the border and into the United States resulting in a third war with the United Kingdom in less than a century. The unit's motto is Semper Paratus (from the Latin: "Always Ready").

The first organizational meeting was held on August 28, 1837, and on September 18, seventy-eight men joined the active company. At the time of its founding, the unit was called The Cleveland City Guards but within the next year the membership decided that their organization would be known by reference to the gray color of their uniforms. On November 29, 1838 the Grays made one of the first of their many parade appearances fully dressed in their distinctive gray uniforms and tall black bearskin caps. As the years passed, those who had earned the status of "Pioneer" for their membership of twenty-five or more years were entitled to add leather aprons to their uniforms and to carry axes when on parade.

The Grays saw military service as a unit during the Civil War and the Spanish–American War. Reforms of the country's militia system which began with the Militia Act of 1903 and continued with subsequent legislation at the state and federal levels meant that the era of private military companies' official participation in national military affairs had come to an end and while the Grays, under the leadership of Ludwig S. Connelly, were able to enlist in the Ohio National Guard (ONG) for duty during the Mexican Punitive Expedition, they essentially did so as a group of private citizens enlisting en masse and not as a private military company. Their participation in World War I, which began immediately upon their ONG unit's release from duty on the Mexican border, was the last conflict in which the Grays saw active service even as a group of enlistees. Individual members have served in subsequent conflicts.

== Building ==
The Grays made their home in several different places from the time of their founding until the completion of their own building on Bolivar Road. The Grays' first armory was located on the fourth floor of the Mechanics Block, newly erected in 1838 at the southeast corner of Ontario Street and Prospect Street. In 1870, they moved into a building which had once served as a fire station on Frankfort Street. By March 20, 1880 the Grays had moved into the new City Armory on Long Street and used that facility as its headquarters along with the 5th Regiment, Ohio National Guard until December 8, 1892 when fire destroyed the building and much of its contents including equipment and guns belonging to the Grays. Major Otto Schade and several of his men were able to save a few items without any cost to their health or their lives. The unit was able to recover very quickly and funds were soon amassed for the purpose of building a new armory. Until construction was completed in 1893, the company found a temporary home at the Gatling Gun Battery Armory on Sibley Street.

=== After the fire ===
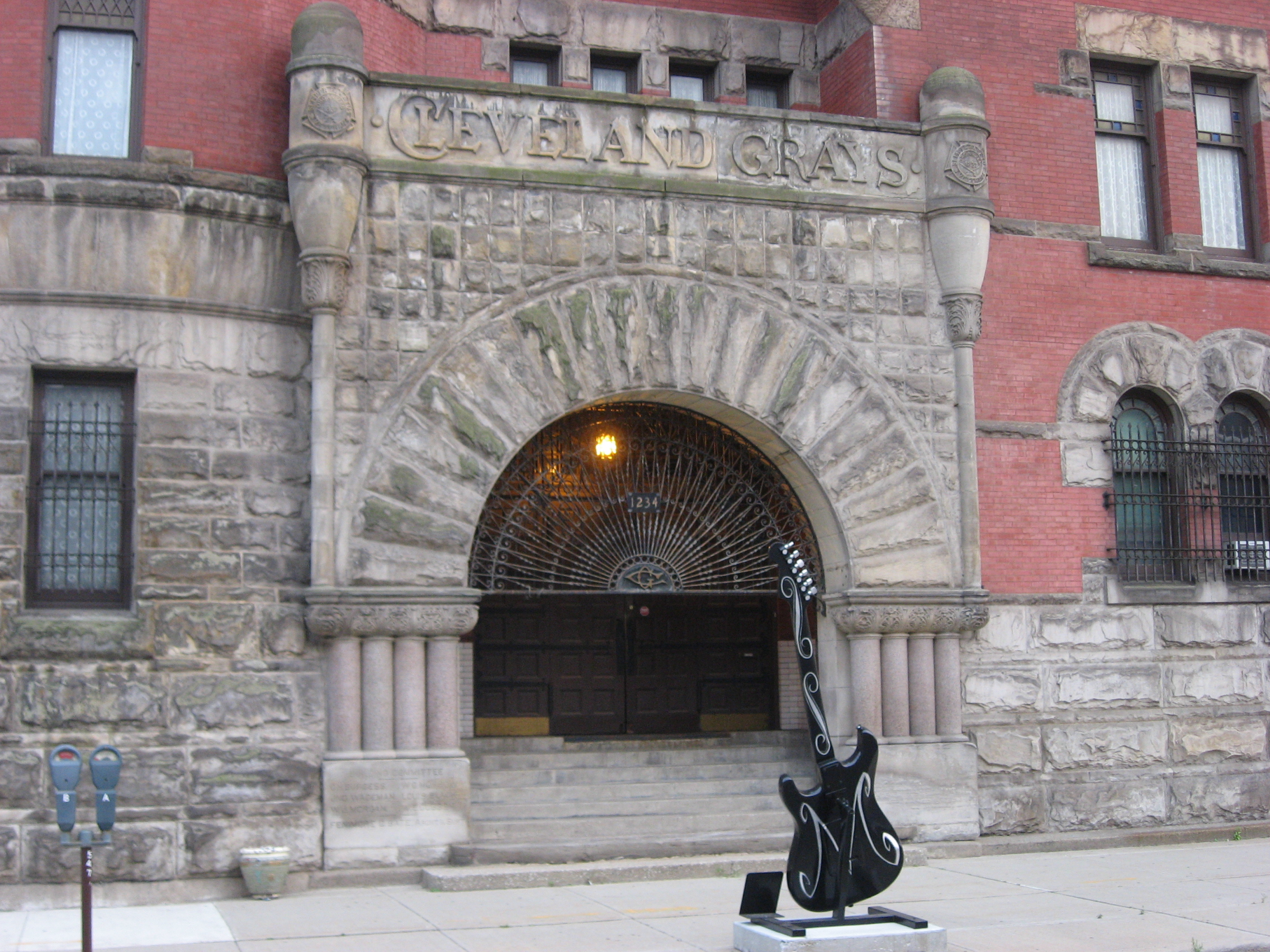
The armory's entrance

On May 30, 1893, a three-ton Berea sandstone foundation block was put in place by Colonel John Frazee. The main portion of the building is four stories high, and the most notable feature is the five-story tower on the northeast corner of the building. The tower has '3 x 5' foundation blocks, the main entrance corners and the front window lintels are all of solid rough-hewn sandstone. The main entry arch rests on top of polished granite columns that rise from each cornerstone. Positioned above is a black iron drop-gate, and a gothic barrier between the front steps and the colossal oak doors. There were also pointed iron rods bolted to the scarlet brick walls that make up the window protectors on the first floor. The effect is a splendid mix of color and texture in materials. The overall design effectively conveys that this is an urban fortress.

The Cleveland Grays Armory has been long known for hosting the city's premier social events. Grays Armory earned repute as an exclusive venue right from the beginning during the celebrations for Cleveland's Centennial (1896). The Grays Armory events went way beyond the customary military balls and band concerts typical during that era. This building was originally built to house weapons and provides a drill hall for the militia; this edifice quickly evolved into a vital community center for the turn-of-the-century Clevelanders.

The Grays Armory Museum is dedicated to preserving and presenting the historical and cultural significance of its institution and associated traditions. In addition to maintaining the historic building and conserving its collection of artifacts, the museum focuses on documenting and interpreting the heritage of individuals who have served in the military and in public service.

The museum supports this mission through the curation and exhibition of materials related to the military history of the United States. It engages with the Greater Cleveland community by organizing public events, including open houses designed to attract a broad and diverse audience. Annually, the museum hosts a Veterans Day program that combines cultural and educational elements to recognize military service. Past events have featured patriotic orchestral performances and traveling exhibitions.

== Organ ==
In July, 1970 the 3 manual 17 rank pipe organ was installed. The organ originates from the Warner Theater in Erie, Pennsylvania. Three or four concerts per year are given on this organ, sponsored by the Western Reserve Theater Organ Society.
