= Jack Gallagher (composer) =

American composer and Professor (born 1947)

Jack Gallagher (born June 27, 1947) is an American composer and retired professor of music at The College of Wooster in Wooster, Ohio. His compositions include orchestral, chamber, piano, wind ensemble, solo, and choral works. He has written three symphonies and one sinfonietta for string orchestra, three of which have been recorded by the London Symphony Orchestra.

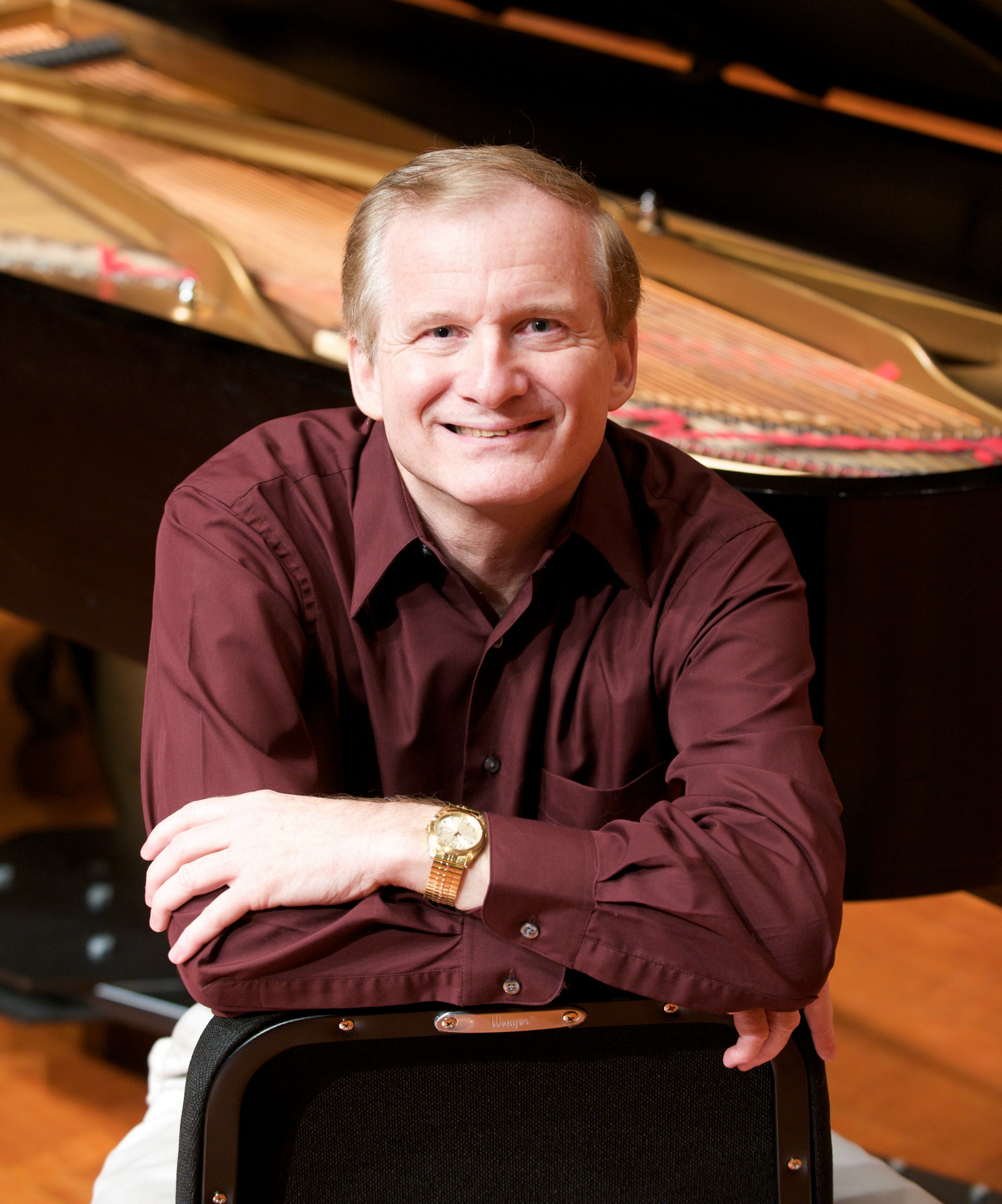
Jack Gallagher at Gault Recital Hall, The College of Wooster, 2008.

== Life and career ==
Gallagher was born in Brooklyn, New York to John J. and Ethel L. Schaffeld Gallagher and raised, until age six, in Glendale, Queens, New York. In 1953, he moved with his family to Plainview, New York, where he studied music in the public schools and, privately, accordion and trumpet. He earned the Bachelor of Arts degree cum laude from Hofstra University and Master of Fine Arts and Doctor of Musical Arts degrees from Cornell University.

Gallagher's principal composition teachers were Elie Siegmeister, Robert Palmer, and Burrill Phillips; he studied conducting with Charles Gouse and Herbert Beattie; his piano teachers were Lawrence Schubert, Malcolm Bilson and Noël Lee; his trumpet teachers included Charles Gouse and Allan Dean. Gallagher was the Olive Williams Kettering Professor of Music at The College of Wooster in Wooster, Ohio, where he was appointed to the faculty in 1977. He was Music Director of the Wooster Symphony Orchestra in 1985-86.

== Performances, Recordings and Broadcasts ==
Gallagher's works have been performed or recorded by orchestras including the London Symphony Orchestra, Buffalo Philharmonic Orchestra, Virginia Symphony Orchestra, Omaha Symphony Orchestra, Charleston Symphony Orchestra, Cleveland Chamber Symphony, Polish Radio and Television Symphony Orchestra of Kraków, Kyiv Philharmonic (National Philharmonic of Ukraine), Cleveland Institute of Music Orchestra, South African National Youth String Orchestra, United States Marine Band String Orchestra, U.S. Air Force Band of Flight, University of Cincinnati College-Conservatory of Music Wind Ensemble, Indiana University Wind Ensemble, the Albany Pro Musica Chorus, GRAMMY®-winning pianist Angelin Chang, Trio Terzetto, and performers including pianist Frank Huang and former Cincinnati Symphony Orchestra Principal Trumpet Robert Sullivan. The Naxos recording titled Orchestral Music was awarded five-star reviews by Anthony Burton of BBC Music Magazine in 2010 and by Steven Ritter of Audiophile Audition online magazine in 2011. The recording of Symphony No. 2 ‘Ascendant’ also was awarded five stars by Audiophile Audition in March 2015.

Gallagher's print editions are published by Editions Marc Reift (Crans-Montana, Switzerland), Kalmus Masters Music Publications, Lawson-Gould, Manduca Music, The Brass Press, and The Piano Teachers' Press. His compositions, included on 19 published compact discs on the Naxos Records, Centaur Records, Musical Heritage Society, Vienna Modern Masters, ERMMedia, Summit Records, Capstone Records, Altissimo, Promuse, Aliud, Musician's Showcase Recordings, and Beauport Classical labels, have been broadcast by more than 120 classical radio stations in the U.S., Canada, Australia, New Zealand, the United Kingdom, the Netherlands, and Vienna, Austria.

From 1977 until 2019 Gallagher taught composition, orchestration, counterpoint, 20th-century music theory and, until 2012, trumpet, at The College of Wooster. His composition students include 2013 International Alliance for Women in Music Ellen Taaffe Zwilich Prize-winner Cara Haxo; 2012 National Federation of Music Clubs Young Composers Award-winner Frederick Evans; 2011 McKnight Foundation Fellowship-winner Elizabeth Alexander; Michael Hennagin Prize-winner Christopher Palestrant; six-time ASCAP Morton Gould Young Composer Award-winner and 2009 Charles Ives Prize-winner awarded by the American Academy of Arts and Letters Ryan Gallagher; Marshall Scholarship-winner Rachel Kincaid; S. Alexander Reed, Professor of Music at Ithaca College and author of Assimilate: A Critical History of Industrial Music; James May, 2018 Mitchell Scholarship-winner and co-winner of the 2017 San Francisco Choral Artists “New Voices” project; 2018 Hackler Composition Prize-winner and former Composer in-Residence with the Dallas Chamber Symphony, Douglas Buchanan; Jung Yoon Wie, a 2017 winner of the American Composer's Forum CONNECT Project Competition with the Pittsburgh New Music Ensemble and 2016 winner of the Princeton University Edward T. Cone Institute New Jersey Symphony readings with conductor David Robertson; Parma Recordings composition contest grand-prize winner Quinn Dizon; Matthew Herman, Associate Professor of Music Theory at Western Kentucky University; and Emily Schwitzgebel, Assistant Professor of Music and Artificial Intelligence (AI) at The University of South Carolina School of Music.

Gallagher's trumpet students include Amanda Bekeny, trumpet teacher at Cleveland State University and Kent State University; Zachary Lyman, Professor of Trumpet at Pacific Lutheran University; John Schuesselin, Associate Professor of Trumpet at the University of Mississippi; Brian McCreath, former Principal Trumpet, Milwaukee Ballet; Susan Sievert Messersmith, formerly of the Charleston Symphony Orchestra; Eric Knorr, Lecturer in Trumpet at the University of Dayton and former Principal Trumpet of the Air Force Band of Flight; and Timothy McCoul of the Illinois Symphony Orchestra.

== Personal life ==
Gallagher's wife, April, taught at The College of Wooster, Ohio, Nursery School from 2000 to 2012 and piano in her home studio from 1977 until 2012; his daughter, Kelly, Pharm.D. from the University of Pittsburgh, is Director of Field Medical Outcomes and Analytics at Pfizer; his son, Ryan, a graduate of The Juilliard School and Cornell University, is a composer and served previously as a member of the visiting faculties at Southeast Missouri State University and Western Oregon University. Gallagher's twin grandsons, Jack and Thomas, and his granddaughter, Grace, live in Pittsburgh, PA.

== Compositions ==
=== Orchestral ===
- Symphony No. 3: Prelude, Canto, and Finale (2017-2025)
- Symphony No. 2 “Ascendant” (2010-2013)
- Sinfonietta for string orchestra (1990/2008)
- Quiet Reflections (1996)
- The Persistence of Memory (In Memoriam: Brian Israel) (1995)
- Symphony in One Movement: Threnody (1991)
- Diversions Overture (1986)
- Berceuse (1977)

=== Wind Ensemble ===
- A Psalm of Life (1997/2008)
- Proteus Rising from the Sea (1994)
- The Persistence of Memory (In Memoriam: Brian Israel) (1989)
- Diversions: Triptych for symphonic band (1985)
- Mist-Covered Mountain (Fantasy for Symphonic Band on a Scottish Pipe Tune) (1982)

=== Choral ===
- A Song of Joys [Whitman], (2016/2022), for a cappella S.A.T.B. chorus
- Dance No More [Chatterton], (2005), for a cappella S.A.T.B. chorus
- Springsong [Shakespeare], (2004), for S.S.A. chorus and piano
- Song of the Daffodils [Wordsworth], (1998), for unison treble chorus and piano
- To Those Who've Fail'd [Whitman], (1983), for a cappella S.A.T.B. chorus
- Three Wordsworth Poems (1982), for S.A.T.B. chorus and piano
- Elegy [Wordsworth], (1981), for a cappella S.A.T.B chorus
- Invocation [Shelley], (1980), for a cappella S.A.T.B. chorus

=== Chamber ===
- Cantus Lyricus (2022/2023) for trumpet in C and piano
- Elegy for Four Cellos (2015)
- Danse Ancienne (2011) for flute, viola and double bass
- Remembrance of Robin (2008/2010) for trumpet in C and piano
- Twin Spirits (2009) for two trumpets in B-flat and piano
- Intimations of Finzi (2004/2022) for clarinet in B-flat and piano
- Duo for Two Cellos (2004/2023)
- Exotic Dances (1996) for violin and piano
- Stanfare (1996) for eight trumpets in B-flat and timpani
- Heritage Music (1988) for violin, cello, piano and horn
- Celebration and Reflection (1987) for brass quintet
- Capriccio for Two Trumpets in B-flat (1984)
- Resonances (1983) for four trumpets in B-flat
- Variations for Cello and Piano (1973)
- Ancient Evenings and Distant Music (1971) for woodwind quintet
- Toccata for Brass Quintet (1970)

=== Vocal ===
- Let Me Make Songs [Harper], (2007), for soprano, trumpet, and piano; also version for mezzo-soprano and piano
- Darest Thou Now, O Soul [Whitman], (1983), for soprano, cello and piano
- Three Songs of Love, Joy and the Beauty of Night [Moore, Browning, and Southey] (1975), for high or low voice and piano.

=== Solo ===
- Souvenirs de Charlier (2020) for trumpet in C or B-flat, unaccompanied
- Aflame (2010), for viola
- Malambo Nouveau (2000/2009), for piano
- Sonata Breve (1981/99), for trumpet in B-flat, unaccompanied
- Evening Music (1998), for piano
- Six Pieces for Kelly (1989), for piano
- Three Little Waltzes and Pastorale (1984), for piano
- Sonata Breve (1981) for tuba, unaccompanied
- Sonata (1979), for trumpet in B-flat, unaccompanied
- Six Bagatelles (1978), for piano
- Happy Birthday, April (1976/2014), for piano
- Nocturne (1976/2008), for piano
- Sonatina (1976/2008), for piano
- Sonata (1973/2008), for piano

== Selected discography ==
- Piano Music of Jack Gallagher, Frank Huang, pianist. Jack Gallagher, producer; Joshua Sauvageau, engineer. Recorded at WFMT Studios, Chicago, Illinois, August 8-9, 2014, Centaur compact disc CRC 3522, 2016.
- Symphony No. 2 ‘Ascendant’ and Quiet Reflections, London Symphony Orchestra, JoAnn Falletta, conductor. Tim Handley, producer; Phillip Rowlands, engineer. Recorded at Blackheath Concert Halls, London, UK, September 2 & 3, 2013, Naxos compact disc 8.559768, January 2015.
- Jack Gallagher: Orchestral Music, London Symphony Orchestra, JoAnn Falletta, conductor. Michael Fine, producer; Wolf-Dieter Karwatky, engineer. Recorded at Abbey Road Studio One, London, UK, January 5 & 6 2009, Naxos compact disc 8.559652, 2010.
- Celebration and Reflection, Bala Brass, Revealed, Beauport Classics compact disc, BC 41420, 2014.
- Toccata for Brass Quintet, U.S. Air Force Heartland of America Brass Quintet, Kiss My Brass, Altissimo Recordings compact disc, 2011.
- Nocturne, Jeri-Mae Astolfi, pianist, Sonance: New Music for Piano, Capstone Records compact disc CPS-8777, 2007.
- Diversions Overture, Kyiv Philharmonic, Robert Ian Winstin, conductor, Masterworks of the New Era, vol. 7, ERMMedia compact disc ERM-6709, 2005.
- The Persistence of Memory (In Memoriam: Brian Israel), Ruse Philharmonic Orchestra, Bulgaria, Tsanko Delibozov, conductor, Vienna, Austria: Vienna Modern Masters compact disc VMM 3036, 1996.
- Proteus Rising from the Sea, Air Force Band of Flight, Lt. Col. Richard A. Shelton, Commander and Conductor, Images, U.S. Air Force compact disc, 1996.
- Berceuse, Polish Radio and Television Symphony Orchestra of Kraków, Szymon Kawalla, conductor. Vienna, Austria: Vienna Modern Masters compact disc VMM 3030, 1995.
- Symphony in One Movement: Threnody, Koszalin Philharmonic Orchestra, Szymon Kawalla, conductor. Vienna, Austria: Vienna Modern Masters compact disc VMM 3028, 1995.
- Toccata for Brass Quintet, U.S. Air Force Heartland of America Brass Quintet, Windswept, Altissimo Recordings, 2007.
- Ancient Evenings and Distant Music, Solaris Wind Quintet, American Quintets, Capstone Records compact disc CPS-8677, 2000.
- Toccata for Brass Quintet, Galliard Brass Ensemble, recorded at Hill Auditorium, University of Michigan. Ocean, New Jersey: Musical Heritage Society, Inc. compact disc MHS 513534T, 1994.
- Capriccio for Two Trumpets, Robert Sullivan and Ken DeCarlo, trumpets, Treasures for Trumpet, Summit Records DCD 319, 2002.

== Selected Videos ==
•Symphony No. 2 ‘Ascendant’ movement II: “Playfully” (excerpt), London Symphony Orchestra, JoAnn Falletta, conductor, Blackheath Halls, London, September 2013

•Symphony No. 2 “Ascendant,” movement IV: “Slowly—Energetically” (excerpt), London Symphony Orchestra, JoAnn Falletta, conductor, Blackheath Halls, London, September 2013

•Symphony No. 2 “Ascendant,” movement IV: “Fast” (excerpt), London Symphony Orchestra, JoAnn Falletta, conductor, Blackheath Halls, London, September 2013

•Remembrance of Robin (part one), Robert Sullivan, trumpet, Julie Spangler, piano; Yamaha Artist Services, New York City, February 2010

•Remembrance of Robin (part two), Robert Sullivan, trumpet, Julie Spangler, piano; Yamaha Artist Services, New York City, February 2010

== Awards ==
- 2016: Ohio Arts Council Individual Excellence Award for Symphony No. 2 "Ascendant"
- 2007: Producer for TNC Records' Grammy Award-winning recording of Olivier Messiaen's Oiseaux exotiques
- 2005: College of Wooster Henry Luce III Award for Distinguished Scholarship
- 1999: Featured guest composer, 37th Annual Contemporary Music Festival, Sam Houston State University, Huntsville, Texas
- 1997: Exotic Dances for violin and piano nominated by editor of American Music magazine for the Pulitzer Prize in music
- 1996: Ohio Music Teachers Association "Composer of the Year"
- 1996: Composer Residency, Charles Ives Center for American Music
- 1995: Ohio Arts Council Individual Artist Fellowship
- 1988: Meet the Composer grant.
- 1987: First Prize, Virginia chapter, College Band Directors National Association Symposium for New Band Music.
- 1994: Associate Fellow, Atlantic Center for the Arts
- 1984: Composer Residency, the Yaddo Corporation
- 1983: Composer Residency, Virginia Center for the Creative Arts
