= Cleveland Orchestra discography =

The Cleveland Orchestra, which was founded in 1918, was first recorded in 1924. Most of the orchestra's recordings have been made either in its concert home, Severance Hall, or in nearby Masonic Auditorium.

== Record labels ==
The Cleveland Orchestra's first recording, of Tchaikovsky's 1812 Overture, was made for the Brunswick label with its first music director, Nikolai Sokoloff.

The Cleveland Orchestra began a long-running association with the Columbia Masterworks label under conductor Artur Rodziński. Successors Erich Leinsdorf, George Szell, and Lorin Maazel all recorded for Columbia, with some early Szell records being assigned to Columbia's budget sub-label, Epic. Szell's recordings with Cleveland in particular have remained steadily in print. In the 1990s the Columbia catalogue was acquired by Sony Classics, which continues to issue the recordings.

The Cleveland Orchestra was one of the first to find new audiences via digital recording technology thanks to its collaboration with the locally based audiophile label Telarc. This association, as well as one with Decca, began under Maazel and continued under his successor Christoph von Dohnányi. The orchestra's cycle of the complete Beethoven symphonies with Dohnányi was one of the first digitally recorded cycles by a major orchestra. The orchestra has also been recorded with a number of guest conductors, including Vladimir Ashkenazy, Riccardo Chailly and Pierre Boulez, who was musical advisor to the orchestra from 1970 to 1972.

The pace of the orchestra's recording activity slowed in the late 1990s when market demand dropped for new CDs. A project to record Wagner's complete Ring cycle with Dohnányi for Decca was left unfinished. Despite the many changes facing commercial record labels at the turn of the century, the orchestra continues to be featured in new releases. In 2007 the orchestra recorded Beethoven's Ninth Symphony under Franz Welser-Möst for Deutsche Grammophon. Pianist Mitsuko Uchida has begun a series of Mozart piano concertos with the orchestra for the Decca label.

In 2020, The Cleveland Orchestra announced they had started their own recording label, self-titled as The Cleveland Orchestra.

== Premiere recordings ==
The Cleveland Orchestra has long been known for performing newer music. Some notable world premiere recordings include:

- Sergei Rachmaninoff: Symphony No. 2 (abridged) (Nikolai Sokoloff, conductor)
- Alban Berg: Violin Concerto (Artur Rodziński, conductor/Louis Krasner, violin)
- John Adams: Century Rolls (Christoph von Dohnányi, conductor/Emanuel Ax, pianist)
- Harrison Birtwistle: Sonance Severance 2000 (Christoph von Dohnányi, conductor)

== Discography ==
The discography below is not comprehensive, but rather representative. The listing only contains Compact Disc releases and does not contain 78 rpm, LP, cassette, or 8-track tape releases. In addition to recordings issued on major labels, it includes limited edition releases on the orchestra's private label. The Cleveland Orchestra's complete discography up to 2000 can be found in Donald Rosenberg's book, The Cleveland Orchestra Story – Second to None.

Title/program	Conductor	Year(s) of recording	Record label
The Cleveland Orchestra 75th anniversary (10-CD set): Rachmaninoff: Symphony No. 2* (World Premiere recording); Shostavokich: Symphony No. 1+; Debussy: Pelléas and Mélisande: Preludes and interludes^; Rimsky-Korsakov: Scheherazade+; Sibelius: Symphonies 2~ & 3~; Wagner: Siegfried Idyll~; Mozart: Requiem, K. 626~; Schumann: Introduction and allegro, Op. 92~; Strauss: Burger als Edelmann Suite~; Ravel: Tombeau de Couperin~ / Daphnis and Chloe, Suite No. 2`; Prokofiev: Classical symphony, Op. 25~ / Scythian suite`; Mahler: Das Lied von der Erde~ / Five Ruckert songs#; Stravinsky: Chant du Rossignol`; Messiaen: Oiseaux exotiques; Druckman: Windows=; Tchaikovsky: Manfred Symphony, Op. 58=; Schubert: Symphony no. 10, D. 936a: Andante#; Weill - Brecht: The Seven Deadly Sins#; Beethoven: Grosse Fuge, Op. 133#; Ruggles: Sun-Treader#; Brahms: Piano Quartet in G minor, Op. 25 (arr. Schoenberg)#	Nicolai Sokoloff*, Artur Rodziński+, Erich Leinsdorf^, George Szell~, Pierre Boulez`, Lorin Maazel=, Christoph von Dohnányi#	1928–1992	Cleveland Orchestra
Mahler: Des Knaben Wunderhorn; Christian Gerhaher, baritone; Magdalena Kožená, mezzo-soprano; Symphony No. 10 in F sharp minor/major: Adagio	Pierre Boulez	2010	Deutsche Grammophon
Wagner: Wesendonck Lieder; Measha Brueggergosman, soprano; Die Meistersinger von Nürnberg: Act 1 Prelude; Rienzi: Overture; Lohengrin: Act 1 & Act 3 Preludes; Tristan und Isolde: Prelude and Liebestod; Die Walküre: Ride of the Valkyries	Franz Welser-Möst	2009	Deutsche Grammophon
Ravel: Piano Concerto for the Left Hand; Piano Concerto in G; Miroirs (piano solo); Pierre-Laurent Aimard, pianist	Pierre Boulez	2010	Deutsche Grammophon
Beethoven: Symphony No. 9: Measha Brueggergosman, soprano; Kelley O'Connor, mezzo-soprano; Frank Lopardo, Tenor; René Pape, bass; The Cleveland Orchestra Chorus	Franz Welser-Möst	2007	Deutsche Grammophon
Mozart: Piano Concertos 23 & 24: Piano Concerto in A major, K. 488; Piano Concerto in C minor, K. 491	Mitsuko Uchida (also pianist)	2008	Decca
Busoni: Piano Concerto: Garrick Ohlsson, pianist; The Cleveland Orchestra Chorus	Christoph von Dohnányi	1990	Telarc
John Adams: Century Rolls: Emanuel Ax, pianist	Christoph von Dohnányi	1999	Nonesuch
Brahms: Piano Concerto in B-flat major, Op. 83: Rudolf Serkin, pianist; Also includes Four pieces for solo piano, Op. 119	George Szell	1966–1979	Sony Classical
Beethoven & Mozart Piano Concertos: Beethoven: Piano Concerto in G Major, Op. 58; Mozart: Piano Concerto in C major, K. 503; Leon Fleisher, pianist	George Szell		Columbia Masterworks Great Performances
Beethoven/Dvořák: Beethoven: Piano Concerto in E-flat major, Op. 73 / Variations C minor on an Original Theme, WoO 80 / Variations A major on a theme of Wranitzky, WoO 71 / Variations on an Original Theme in D major, Op. 76; Emil Gilels, pianist; Dvořák: Symphony in G major, Op. 88/B 163 / Slavonic Dance, Op. 72/B 147: No. 2 in E minor / Slavonic Dance, Op. 46/B 83: No. 3 in A-flat major	George Szell	1968 & 1970	Angel/EMI
Beethoven: Piano Concertos 1-4: Beethoven: Piano Concerto in C major, Op. 15 / Piano Concerto in B-flat major, 19 / Piano Concerto in C minor, Op. 37 / Piano Concerto in G major, Op. 58; Emil Gilels, pianist	George Szell	1968	Angel/EMI
Beethoven: Piano Concertos 3 & 4: Beethoven: Piano Concerto in C minor, Op. 37 / Piano Concerto in G major, Op. 58; Leon Fleisher, pianist	George Szell	1959 & 1961	Sony Classical
Brahms: Piano Concerto No. 1 / Handel Variations: Brahms: Piano Concerto in D minor, Op. 15 / Variations and Fugue on a theme by Handel, Op. 24; Rudolf Serkin, pianist	George Szell	1968–1979	Sony Classical
Berlioz: Roméo Et Juliette, Les Nuits D'été: Berlioz: Roméo et Juliette, Op. 17 / Les nuits d'été, Op. 7; Melanie Diener, soprano; Kenneth Tarver, tenor; Denis Sedov, bass; Cleveland Orchestra Chorus	Pierre Boulez	2000	Deutsche Grammophon
Berlioz: Symphonie Fantastique: Berlioz: Symphonie Fantastique, Op. 14 / Tristia, Op. 18*; Cleveland Orchestra Chorus*	Pierre Boulez	1996	Deutsche Grammophon
Boulez Conducts Stravinsky: Stravinsky: Chant du rossignol / Scherzo fantastique, Op. 3 / Le roi des étoiles / L'histoire du soldat: Suite for Chamber Ensemble	Pierre Boulez	1994–1996	Deutsche Grammophon
Debussy: Images: Debussy: Images for Orchestra / Prélude à l'après-midi d'un faune / Printemps	Pierre Boulez	1991	Deutsche Grammophon
Mahler: Symphony No. 7	Pierre Boulez	1994	Deutsche Grammophon
Debussy: La Mer: Debussy: Three Nocturnes for Orchestra* / Jeux / La mer / Première Rhapsodie for Clarinet and Orchestra+; Cleveland Orchestra Chorus*; Franklin Cohen, clarinet+	Pierre Boulez	1991–1993	Deutsche Grammophon
Mahler: Symphony No. 4: William Preucil, violin; Juliane Banse, soprano	Pierre Boulez	1998	Deutsche Grammophon
Messiaen: Et Exspecto Resurrectionem Mortuorum: Messiaen: Chronochromie / La ville d'en haut / Et exspecto resurrectionem mortuorum	Pierre Boulez	1993	Deutsche Grammophon
Messiaen: Poèmes pour Mi, 7 Haïkaï: Messiaen: Poèmes pour Mi / Réveil des Oiseaux / Haïkaï (7)	Pierre Boulez	1994–1996	Deutsche Grammophon
Schoenberg: Piano Concerto: Schoenberg: Concerto for Piano, Op. 42+ / Pieces for Piano, Op. 11 / Little Pieces for Piano, Op. 19; Berg: Sonata for Piano, Op. 1; Variations for Piano, Op. 27; Mitsuko Uchida, piano; The orchestra only performs in the Concerto+	Pierre Boulez	1998 & 2000	Philips
Ravel, Debussy: Ravel: Shéhérazade* / Le tombeau de Couperin / Pavane pour une infante défunte / Menuet antique; Debussy: Danse sacrée et danse profane+ / Poèmes (5) de Baudelaire: no 3, Le jet d'eau^ / Ballades (3) de François Villon^; Anne Sofie von Otter, mezzo-soprano*; Lisa Wellbaum, harp+; Alison Hagley, soprano^	Pierre Boulez	1999	Deutsche Grammophon
Stravinsky: Pétrouchka, Le Sacre Du Printemps	Pierre Boulez	1991	Deutsche Grammophon
Bartók, Lutoslawski: Concertos For Orchestra: Bartók: Concerto for Orchestra, Sz 116; Lutoskawski: Concerto for Orchestra	Christoph von Dohnányi	1988–1989	Decca
Beethoven: Complete Symphonies (5-CD set): Beethoven: Symphonies 1-9 / Leonore Overture, No. 3 Op. 72a; Carol Vaness, soprano; Janice Taylor, mezzo-soprano; Siegfried Jerusalem, tenor; Robert Lloyd, bass; Cleveland Orchestra Chorus	Christoph von Dohnányi	1983–1988	Telarc
Berlioz: Symphonie Fantastique: Berlioz: Symphonie fantastique, Op. 14; Weber: Invitation to the Dance, Op. 65	Christoph von Dohnányi	1989	Decca
Brahms: Symphonies, Overtures & Violin Concerto (4-CD set): Brahms: Symphonies 1 – 4 / Concerto for Violin in D major, Op. 77 / Academic Festival Overture, Op. 80 / Tragic Overture, Op. 81; Thomas Zehetmair, violin	Christoph von Dohnányi		Warner Classics
Bruckner: Symphonies 3 & 8: Bruckner: Symphony No. 3 in D minor, WAB 103 / Symphony no 8 in C minor, WAB 108	Christoph von Dohnányi	1989	Decca
Bruckner: Symphony No. 4: Bruckner: Symphony No. 4 in E flat major, WAB 104 "Romantic"	Christoph von Dohnányi		Decca
Bruckner: Symphony No. 5: Bruckner: Symphony No. 5 in B flat major, WAB 105	Christoph von Dohnányi	1991	Decca
Bruckner: Symphony No. 6: Bruckner: Symphony No. 6 in A major, WAB 106; J. S. Bach: Musikalisches Opfer, BWV 1079: No. 8, Ricercar a 6	Christoph von Dohnányi	1991 & 1993	Decca
Bruckner: Symphony No. 7: Bruckner: Symphony No. 7 in E major, WAB 107	Christoph von Dohnányi		Decca
Bruckner: Symphony No. 9: Bruckner: Symphony No. 9 in D minor, WAB 109	Christoph von Dohnányi		Decca
Schubert: Symphonies Nos. 8 & 9: Schubert: Symphony No. 8 in B minor, D 759 "Unfinished" / Symphony No. 9 in C major, D 944 "Great"	Christoph von Dohnányi		Telarc
Mendelssohn: Symphony No. 3: Mendelssohn: Symphony No. 3 in A minor, Op. 56 "Scottish" / Die erste Walpurgisnacht, Op. 60	Christoph von Dohnányi	1988	Telarc
Tchaikovsky: Symphony No. 6: Tchaikovsky: Symphony No 6 in B minor, Op. 74 "Pathétique" / Eugene Onegin, Op. 24: Polonaise	Christoph von Dohnányi	1986	Telarc
Dvořák: Slavonic Dances: Dvořák: Eight Slavonic Dances, Op. 46/B 83 / Eight Slavonic Dances, Op. 72/B 147	Christoph von Dohnányi		Decca
Dvořák: Symphonies 7, 8 & 9: Dvořák: Symphony No. 7 in D minor, Op. 70/B 141 / Symphony No. 8 in G major, Op. 88/B 163 / Symphony No. 9 in E minor, Op. 95/B 178 "From the New World" / Scherzo capriccioso, Op. 66/B 131	Christoph von Dohnányi		Decca
Dvořák: Symphony No. 6 / Janáček: Taras Bulba: Dvořák: Symphony No. 6 in D major, Op. 60/B 112; Janáček: Taras Bulba	Christoph von Dohnányi	1989	Decca
Ives: Symphony No. 4: Ives: Symphony No. 4* / The Unanswered Question No. 2; Varèse: Amériques; The Cleveland Orchestra Chorus*	Christoph von Dohnányi	1991–1994	Decca
Ives / Ruggles: Ives: First Orchestral Set "Three Places in New England" / Set No. 2 for Small Orchestra*; Ruggles: Men and Mountains / Sun-treader; Seeger: Andante for Strings; The Cleveland Orchestra Chorus*	Christoph von Dohnányi	1993–1994	Decca
Mahler: Symphony No. 1: Mahler: Symphony No. 1 in D major "Titan"	Christoph von Dohnányi		Decca
Mahler: Symphony No. 4: Mahler: Symphony No. 4 in G major; Daniel Majeske, violin; Dawn Upshaw, soprano	Christoph von Dohnányi	1992	Decca
Mahler: Symphony No. 5: Mahler: Symphony No. 5 in C sharp minor	Christoph von Dohnányi		Decca
Mahler: Symphony No. 6 / Schoenberg / Webern: Mahler: Symphony No. 6 in A minor "Tragic"; Webern: Im Sommerwind; Schoenberg: Five Pieces for Orchestra, Op. 16	Christoph von Dohnányi	1991	Decca
Mahler: Symphony No. 9: Mahler: Symphony No. 9 in D major; Hartmann: Symphony No. 2 "Adagio"	Christoph von Dohnányi	1994 & 1997	Decca
Mozart: Concertos: Concerto for Clarinet in A major, K 622; Franklin Cohen, clarinet; Concerto for Oboe in C major, K 314; John Mack, oboe; Concerto for Bassoon in B flat major, K 191; David McGill, Bassoon	Christoph von Dohnányi		Decca
Mozart: Eine Kleine Nachtmusik: Serenade in G major, K 525 "Eine kleine Nachtmusik"; Concerto for Flute and Harp in C major, K 299; Lisa Bellbaum, harp; Joshua Smith, flute; Sinfonia concertante for Violin and Viola in E flat major, K 364; Daniel Majeske, Violin; Robert Vernon, viola	Christoph von Dohnányi	1991 & 1993	Decca
Mozart: Symphonies Nos. 35-41 / Webern: Orchestra works (3-CD set): Mozart: Symphony No. 35 in D major, K 385 "Haffner" / Symphony No. 36 in C major, K 425 "Linz" / Symphony No. 38 in D major, K 504 "Prague" / Symphony No. 39 in E flat major, K 543 / Symphony No. 40 in G minor, K 550 / Symphony No. 41 in C major, K 551 "Jupiter"; Webern: Passacaglia for Orchestra, Op. 1 / Six Pieces for Orchestra, Op. 6 / Five Pieces for Orchestra, Op. 10 / Symphony, Op. 21	Christoph von Dohnányi		Decca
Norton Memorial Organ: Strauss: Also sprach Zarathustra; Saint-Saëns: Symphony No. 3 ("Organ")	Sir Andrew Davis, Jahja Ling	2001	Cleveland Orchestra
Mussorgsky: Pictures at an Exhibition (orch. Ravel) / Night on the Bare Mountain	Christoph von Dohnányi		Teldec
Ravel: Boléro / La valse / Miroirs: Alborada del gracioso / Daphnis et Chloé Suite no 2	Christoph von Dohnányi	1989 & 1991	Teldec
Schumann: The Symphonies (2-CD set)	Christoph von Dohnányi		Decca
Smetana: Má vlast: Moldau, T 111 / Libuse, T 107: Overture / The two widows, T 109: Overture / The kiss, T 115: Overture / Bartered Bride, B 143/T 93: Overture; Polka; Furiant; Dance of the Comedians	Christoph von Dohnányi		Decca
R. Strauss: Ein Heldenleben, Op. 40 / Till Eulenspiegels lustige Streiche, Op. 28	Christoph von Dohnányi		Decca
The Joshua Bell Edition Vol. 3 ( 2-CD set): Tchaikovsky: Concerto for Violin in D major, Op. 35*; Wieniawski: Concerto for Violin no 2 in D minor, Op. 22*; Brahms: Concerto for Violin in D major, Op. 77; Schumann: Concerto for Violin in D minor; Joshua Bell, violin	Christoph von Dohnányi, Vladimir Ashkenazy*	1988 & 1994	Decca
Wagner: Das Rheingold (2-CD set): Iidiko Komlósi, mezzo-soprano; Gabriele Fontana, soprano; Walter Fink, bass; Jan-Hendrik Rootering, bass; Elena Zaremba, mezzo-soprano; Eike Wilm Schulte, baritone; Thomas Sunnegardh, tenor; Franz Josef Kapellmann, bass; Peter Schreier, tenor; Kim Begley, tenor; Nancy Gustafson, soprano; Hanna Schwarz, mezzo-soprano; Robert Hale (bass-baritone); Margaretha Hintermeier, alto	Christoph von Dohnányi	1993	Decca
Wagner: Die Walküre: Poul Elming; Alessandra Marc; Alfred Muff; Robert Hale; Gabriele Schnaut; Anja Silja	Christoph von Dohnányi	1992	Decca
Stravinsky: The Fairy's Kiss: Faun and shepherdess, Op. 2 / The Fairy's Kiss / Ode	Oliver Knussen		Deutsche Grammophon
The Original Jacket Collection – Mozart (10-CD set): Symphonies: Symphony No. 28 in C major, K 200 / Symphony No. 33 in B flat major, K 319 / Symphony No. 35 in D major, K 385 "Haffner" / Symphony No. 39 in E flat major, K 543 (two recordings) / Symphony No. 40 in G minor, K 550 (two recordings) / Symphony No. 41 in C major, K 551 "Jupiter" (two recordings); Le nozze di Figaro, K 492: Overture / Der Schauspieldirektor, K 486: Overture; Divertimento for Flute, Oboe, Bassoon, 4 Horns and Strings in D major, K 131; Sinfonia concertante for Violin and Viola in E flat major, K 364 (320d); Rafael Druian, violin; Abraham Skernick, viola; Exsultate jubilate, K 165; Judith Raskin, soprano; Serenade in G major, K 525 "Eine kleine Nachtmusik"; Serenade in D major, K 320 "Posthorn"; Bernard Adelstein, posthorn; Divertimento for 2 Horns and Strings in D major, K 334+; Requiem in D minor, K 626: Lacrymosa^; Minuet in C major, K 409~; Concerto for Clarinet in A major, K 622; Robert Marcellus, clarinet; Concerto for Piano in C major, K 503; Leon Fleisher, piano; Sonata for Violin and Piano in F major, K 376 / Sonata for Violin and Piano in G major, K 301 / Sonata for Violin and Piano in E minor, K 304 / Sonata for Violin and Piano in C major, K 296; George Szell, piano; Rafael Druian, violin; Quartet for Piano and Strings in G minor, K 478 / Quartet for Piano and Strings in E flat major, K 493; George Szell, piano; Budapest String Quartet	George Szell, Louis Lane+, Robert Shaw,^ Erich Leinsdorf~		Sony Classical
Prokofiev: Romeo & Juliet - Excerpts	Yoel Levi	1983	Telarc
Sibelius: Finlandia, Op. 26 / Symphony No. 2 in D major, Op. 43	Yoel Levi	1984	Telarc
Beethoven: Symphony No. 9: Symphony No. 9 in D minor, Op. 125 "Choral"; Lucia Popp, soprano; Elena Obraztsova, mezzo-soprano; Jon Vickers, tenor; Martti Talvela, bass; The Cleveland Orchestra Chorus; Egmont, Op. 84: Overture	Lorin Maazel	1978	Sony Classical
Berlioz / Tchaikovsky: Berlioz: Symphonie fantastique, Op. 14; Tchaikovsky: Nutcracker Suite, Op. 71a	Lorin Maazel	1981–1982	Telarc
Gershwin: Porgy & Bess (3-CD set): François Clemmons, tenor; Arthur Thompson, baritone; Barbara Conrad, alto; Barbara Hendricks, soprano; Florence Quivar, mezzo-soprano; McHenry Boatwright, baritone; Leona Mitchell, soprano; Willard White, baritone; Cleveland Orchestra Chorus	Lorin Maazel		Decca
Mussorgsky: Pictures at an Exhibition (orch. Ravel) / Night on Bare Mountain	Lorin Maazel	1978	Telarc
Prokofiev: Romeo and Juliet (2-CD set): Romeo and Juliet, Op. 64 (complete ballet)	Lorin Maazel	1973	Decca
Respighi / Rimsky-Korsakov: Respighi: Pines of Rome / Roman Festivals; Rimsky-Korsakov: Golden Cockerel: Suite	Lorin Maazel		Decca
Shostakovich / Tchaikovsky: Shostakovich: Symphony No. 5 in D minor, Op. 47; Tchaikovsky: Romeo and Juliet Overture	Lorin Maazel	1981	Telarc
Stravinsky / Tchaikovsky: Stravinsky: The Rite of Spring; Tchaikovsky: Symphony No. 4 in F minor, Op. 36	Lorin Maazel	1980	Telarc
Saint-Saëns / Schumann: Cello Concertos: Saint-Saëns: Concerto for Cello in A minor, Op. 33; Schumann: Concerto for Cello in A minor, Op. 129; Lynn Harrell, cello	Sir Neville Marriner		Decca
Shostakovich: Symphony No. 15: Shostakovich: Symphony No. 15 in A major, Op. 141	Kurt Sanderling	1991	Erato
The Original Jacket Collection – The Complete Beethoven Symphonies (10-CD set): Beethoven: Symphonies 1-9 / Egmont Overture / Coriolanus Overture, Op. 62 / King Stephen Overture / Leonore Overtures 1-3 / Fidelio Overture / The Creatures of Prometheus, complete ballet, Op. 43*; Mozart: Symphony No. 41 in C major, K. 551 "Jupiter"	George Szell, Louis Lane*		Sony Classical
Beethoven: The Five Piano Concertos (3-CD set): Beethoven: Piano Concertos 1–5; Mozart: Piano Concerto No. 25 in C major, K. 503; Leon Fleisher, piano	George Szell		Columbia Masterworks
Brahms: Piano Concertos (2-CD set): Brahms: Piano Concerto No. 1 in D minor, Op. 15 / Piano Concerto No. 2 in B flat major, Op. 83 / Variations and Fugue on a theme by Handel, Op. 24 / Waltzes, Op. 39; Leon Fleisher, piano	George Szell	1956–1962	Sony Classical Masterworks Heritage
Brahms: Violin Concerto: Brahms: Violin Concerto in D major, Op. 77 / Sonata for Violin and Piano in D minor, Op. 108*; David Oistrakh, violin; Vladimir Yampolsky*, piano	George Szell		EMI Classics
Brahms: Symphonies Nos. 2 & 3: Brahms: Symphony No. 2 in D major, Op. 73 / Symphony No. 3 in F major, Op. 90	George Szell	1964–1967	Sony ClassicalEssential Classics
Brahms: Symphony No. 4: Brahms: Symphony No. 4 in E minor, Op. 98 / Academic Festival Overture, Op. 80 / Tragic Overture, Op. 81	George Szell		Sony ClassicalEssential Classics
Dvořák: Slavonic Dances (complete): Dvořák: Slavonic Dances for Orchestra, Op. 46/B 83 / Slavonic Dances for Orchestra, Op. 72/B 147	George Szell	1962–1965	Sony ClassicalEssential Classics
Dvořák: Three Great Symphonies (2-CD set): Dvořák: Symphony No. 7 in D minor, Op. 70 / Symphony No. 8 in G major, Op. 88 / Symphony no. 9 in E minor, Op. 95 "From the New World" / Carnival Overture, Op. 92; Smetana: Overture to the Bartered Bride / String Quartet in E minor "From My Life" (orch. Szell)	George Szell	1962–1965	Sony Classical Masterworks Heritage
Franck / Rachmaninoff: Franck: Symphonic Variations for Piano and Orchestra, M 46; Rachmaninoff: Rhapsody on a theme of Paganini, Op. 43; Miroirs: Alborada del gracioso; Leon Fleisher, piano	George Szell		Columbia Masterworks Great Performances
Mussorgsky / Rimsky-Korsakov: Mussorgsky: Pictures at an Exhibition / Khovanshchina: Act 1 Prelude "Dawn on the Moscow River"; Rimsky-Korsakov: Capriccio espagnol, Op. 34; Liadov: The enchanted lake, Op. 62; Borodin: Prince Igor: Polovtsian Dances	George Szell		Sony Classical
Grieg / Schumann: Piano Concertos: Grieg: Piano Concerto in A minor, Op. 16; Schumann: Piano Concerto in A minor, Op. 54; Leon Fleisher, piano	George Szell		Columbia Masterworks Great Performances
Haydn: Early London Symphonies (2-CD set): Symphony Nn. 93 in D major / Symphony No 94 in G major, "Surprise" / Symphony No. 95 in C minor / Symphony No. 96 in D major "Miracle" / Symphony No. 97 in C major / Symphony No. 98 in B flat major	George Szell		Sony Classical
Kodály / Prokofiev: Kodály: Háry János, Op. 15: Suite; Prokofiev: Lieutenant Kijé Suite, Op. 60	George Szell		Columbia Masterworks Great Performances
Prokofiev / Bartók: Prokofiev: Symphony No. 5 in B flat major, Op. 100; Bartók: Concerto for Orchestra, Sz 116	George Szell	1959 & 1965	Sony Classical Masterworks Heritage
Schumann: The Four Symphonies (2-CD set): Schumann: Symphonies 1-4 / Manfred Overture, Op. 115	George Szell	1958–1960	Sony Classical Masterworks Heritage
Mahler / Mozart (2-CD set): Mahler: Symphony No. 4 in G major; Mozart: Exsultate jubilate, K 165 (158a); Judith Raskin, soprano	George Szell		CBS Masterworks
Mahler: Symphony No. 6: Mahler: Symphony No. 6 in A minor "Tragic"	George Szell		Sony Classical Great Performances
Mendelssohn: "Italian" Symphony: Mendelssohn: Symphony No. 4 in A major, Op. 90 "Italian" / Midsummer Night's Dream, Op. 61 / Hebrides Overture, in B minor Op. 26 "Fingal's Cave"; SACD disc only playable on Super Audio CD Players	George Szell	1962–1967	Sony Classical
Mozart: Piano Concertos 21 & 26: Mozart: Piano Concerto No. 21 in C major, K 467 / Piano Concerto No. 26 in D major, K 537 "Coronation"* / Variations (12) for Piano in C major on "Ah vous dirai-je maman", K 265+; For contractual reasons, the Cleveland Orchestra was billed as the Columbia Symphony Orchestra on this recording.*; Robert Casadesus, piano; André Previn+, piano	George Szell		Sony Classical Essential Classics
Mozart: Piano Concertos 21 & 24: Mozart: Piano Concerto No. 21 in C major, K 467 / Piano Concerto No. 24 in C minor, K. 491; Robert Casadesus, piano	George Szell		CBS Masterworks Great Performances
Prokofiev: Piano Concertos 1 & 3: Prokofiev: Piano Concerto No. 1 in D-flat major, Op. 10 / Piano Concerto No. 3 in C major, Op. 26 / Piano Sonata No. 2 in D minor, Op. 14 / Piano Sonata No. 3 in A minor, Op. 28; Gary Graffman, piano; The Sonatas are works for solo piano and do not include the orchestra	George Szell	1962–1966	Sony Classical Great Performances
Schubert: Symphonies 8 & 9: Schubert: Symphony No. 8 in B minor, D. 759 / Symphony No. 9 in C major, D 944 "Great"	George Szell		Sony Classical Essential Classics
R. Strauss Tone Poems: R. Strauss: Don Juan, Op. 20 / Till Eulenspiegel's Merry Pranks, Op. 28 / Death and Transfiguration, Op. 24	George Szell		CBS Masterworks Great Performances
Strauss Waltzes: Johann Strauss, Jr: On the Beautiful, Blue Danube, Op. 314 / Frühlingsstimmen, Op. 410 / Perpetuum mobile, Op. 257 / Die Fledermaus: Overture / Pizzicato Polka; Josef Strauss: Delirien, Op. 212 / Dorfschwalben aus Österreich, Op. 164; SACD disc only playable on Super Audio CD Players	George Szell	1958 & 1962	Sony Classical
Tchaikovsky: Piano Concerto No. 1: Tchaikovsky: Piano Concerto No. 1 in B flat minor, Op.; Rachmaninoff: Prelude in G minor, Op. 23, No. 5 / Prelude in G-sharp minor, Op. 32, No. 12 / Prelude in A minor, Op. 32, No. 8; Gary Graffman, piano; The Rachmaninoff works are for solo piano and do not include the orchestra.	George Szell	1969	CBS Masterworks Great Performances
Tchaikovsky: Symphony No. 5: Tchaikovsky: Symphony No. 5 in E minor, Op. 64 / Capriccio italien, Op. 45	George Szell	1958 & 1959	Sony Classical Great Performances
Orff: Carmina Burana: Kenneth Riegel, tenor; Judith Blegen, soprano; Peter Binder, baritone	Michael Tilson Thomas	1974	Sony Classical Great Performances
Live in Tokyo (2-CD set): Weber: Overture to Oberon; Mozart: Symphony No. 40 in G Minor, K. 550; Sibelius: Symphony No. 2 in D Major, Op. 43; Berlioz: Rákóczy March; Interview with Pierre Boulez	George Szell	1970	Cleveland Orchestra
Beethoven: The Five Piano Concertos: Beethoven: Piano Concertos 1 – 5 / Choral Fantasy, Op. 80; Vladimir Ashkenazy	Vladimir Ashkenazy		Decca
Severance Hall reopening concert: Smith: The Star Spangled Banner; Birtwistle: Sonance Severance 2000 (World Premiere); Ligeti: Atmospheres; Prokofiev: Classical Symphony; Ravel: Daphnis & Chloe Suite No. 2; Wagner: Overture to "Die Meistersinger von Nürnberg"	Christoph von Dohnányi	2000	Cleveland Orchestra
The Cleveland Sound: Bruckner: Symphonies Nos. 3, 4, 5, 7, 8, 9; Mahler: Symphonies Nos. 1, 4, 5, 6	Christoph von Dohnányi	2000	Decca
A New Century: Beethoven: String Quartet in A minor, Op. 132 (arr. Franz Welser-Möst); Varèse: Amériques; Staud: Stromab; R. Strauss: Aus Italien, Op. 16; Deutsch: Okeanos (Paul Jacobs, organ); Prokofiev: Symphony No. 3 in C minor, Op. 44	Franz Welser-Möst	2020	Cleveland Orchestra
Schubert and Křenek: Schubert: Symphony in C Major ("The Great"); Křenek: Static and Ecstatic, Op. 214	Franz Welser-Möst	2020	Cleveland Orchestra
Schnittke and Prokofiev: Schnittke: Concerto for Piano and Strings; Prokofiev: Symphony No. 2 in D minor, Op. 40	Franz Welser-Möst	2021	Cleveland Orchestra`
Strauss: Three Tone Poems: Macbeth; Don Juan; Till Eulenspiegel's Merry Pranks	Franz Welser-Möst	2021	Cleveland Orchestra
George Walker: Antifonys (for string orchestra); Sinfonia No. 4, “Threads”; Lilacs (for voice and orchestra); Sinfonia No. 5, “Visions”	Franz Welser-Möst	2022	Cleveland Orchestra
Prokofiev: Symphony No. 5: Prokofiev: Symphony No. 5 in B-Flat Major, Op. 100	Franz Welser-Möst	2023	Cleveland Orchestra
Berg: Three Pieces from Lyric Suite - Strauss: Suite from Der Rosenkavalier: Berg: Three Pieces from Lyric Suite (for string orchestra); Richard Strauss: Suite from "Der Rosenkavalier," Op. 59, TrV 227 (Arranged by Franz Welser-Möst)	Franz Welser-Möst	2023	Cleveland Orchestra
Schubert: Mass No. 6 in E-Flat Major: Schubert: Mass No. 6 in E-flat major, D. 950	Franz Welser-Möst	2023	Cleveland Orchestra
Tchaikovsky: Symphony No. 4: Tchaikovsky: Symphony No. 4 in F Minor, Op. 36	Franz Welser-Möst	2023	Cleveland Orchestra
Prokofiev: Symphony No. 6: Prokofiev: Symphony No. 6 in E-Flat Minor, Op. 111	Franz Welser-Möst	2024	Cleveland Orchestra
Bartók: String Quartet No. 3 & Suite from The Miraculous Mandarin: Bartók: String Quartet No. 3, Sz. 85, BB 93 (Arranged by Stanley Konopka for double string orchestra); Bartók: Suite from "The Miraculous Mandarin," Op. 19, Sz. 73, BB 82	Franz Welser-Möst	2024	Cleveland Orchestra
Bruckner: Symphony No. 4 "Romantic": Bruckner: Symphony No. 4 in E-Flat major, WAB 4 "Romantic" (1878/80 version)	Franz Welser-Möst	2024	Cleveland Orchestra
Berlioz: Symphonie Fantastique: Berlioz: "Symphonie Fantastique," Op. 14	Franz Welser-Möst	2024	Cleveland Orchestra
Eastman: Symphony No. 2 - Tchaikovsky: Symphony No. 2: Eastman: Symphony No. 2 "The Faithful Friend: The Lover Friend's Love for the Beloved"; Tchaikovsky: Symphony No. 2 in C Minor, Op. 27 "Little Russian/Ukrainian"	Franz Welser-Möst	2024	Cleveland Orchestra
Mozart: Piano Concerto No. 27 & Symphony No. 29: Mozart: Piano Concerto No. 27 in B-Flat Major, K. 595 (Garrick Ohlsson, Piano); Mozart: Symphony No. 29 in A Major, K. 201	Franz Welser-Möst	2025	Cleveland Orchestra
