= Hyman Schandler =

American violinist and conductor

Hyman Schandler (August 11, 1900 – September 3, 1990) was a violinist, teacher, and conductor. He was the founder and conductor of the Cleveland Women's Orchestra, the oldest women's orchestra in the world.

== Early life ==
Schandler was born in Riga, Latvia. He emigrated to Cleveland at the age of three with his mother and three sisters. His father, a tailor, had arrived two years earlier. At the age of nine, Schandler began his studies at Bailey's Music School, which later became the Cleveland Music School Settlement. He went to Central High School and West High School. At the age of 18, Schandler began conducting instrumental groups and teaching the violin at the settlement.

== Career ==
In 1927, Schandler auditioned for conductor Nikolai Sokoloff of the Cleveland Orchestra and became second violinist. He soon became principal second violinist, a position he held for 35 years. He performed with the orchestra for 48 years. In 1931, Schandler traveled to Salzburg, Austria, to study violin with Theodore Mueller and conducting with Herbert von Karajan. There, he performed with the Salzburg Festival Orchestra and Salzburg Mozarteum.

In 1935, Schandler formed the Cleveland Women's Orchestra, an orchestra composed primarily of 60 women musicians, ranging from sixteen to seventy-five years old. Their first concert was on November 17, 1936, at Severance Hall. Since then, the orchestra has played annual concerts at Severance Hall as well as several concerts in nursing homes, hospitals, and other outreach programs. Schandler remained as the orchestra's conductor for 55 years until his death in 1990. He was succeeded by Robert Cronquist as musical director.

Following his retirement in 1975, Schandler played for two seasons in the Dallas Symphony Orchestra as principal guest conductor, which was then led by Louis Lane. During this time, he commuted back to Cleveland to continue conducting the Cleveland Women's Orchestra.

== Personal life ==
In 1926, Schandler married Rebecca White, a pianist and faculty colleague. Their ceremony was performed at the Cleveland Music School Settlement. They had two daughters, Dorothy and Linda.
