= John McLaughlin Williams =

- Born: 1957 (age 68–69); North Carolina, U.S.
- Genre: Classical
- Occupations: Conductor, performer
- Instrument: Violin

John McLaughlin Williams (born 1957) is a Grammy award-winning American orchestral conductor and violinist.

Williams, who is of African American heritage, was born in Greensboro, North Carolina. He attended the Boston University School of Music, the New England Conservatory and is a graduate of The Cleveland Institute of Music. His violin studies were with Dorothy DeLay, conducting with Carl Topilow and composition with Donald Erb and Margaret Brouwer.

He has appeared as a guest conductor with the Novaya Russiya, Detroit Symphony Orchestra, National Symphony Orchestra of Ukraine, Classic FM Symphony Orchestra (Sofia), the Colorado Symphony Orchestra, the Chicago Sinfonietta, and many other ensembles. He has recorded several CDs for the Naxos Records label, all in their American Classics series, where he has shown a remarkable ability to uncover lost gems by American composers of the first half of the 20th century (such as Henry Hadley and John Alden Carpenter), and bring them vividly to life with the National Symphony Orchestra of Ukraine and the National Radio Symphony Orchestra of Ukraine. The resurgence of interest in western American composer George Frederick McKay (1899-1970) can be attributed to William's pioneering Naxos recordings of McKay's music. He was awarded a Grammy in 2007 for his recording of Olivier Messiaen's Oiseaux exotiques, in which he conducted the Cleveland Chamber Symphony with pianist Angelin Chang, who also received a Grammy. Williams has received a total of four Grammy nominations. Williams has also served as assistant conductor of the Britt Festival in Oregon. As a violinist, he has appeared as a soloist around the United States and was an active freelancer in the Boston area, where he was assistant concertmaster of the Boston Pops Esplanade Orchestra and played as a substitute with the Boston Symphony. Williams was also a member of the Houston Symphony, and was concertmaster of the Virginia Symphony.

He is based in Ann Arbor, Michigan.

== Awards and recognitions ==
- 2010 Grammy Nomination for Best Chamber Music Performance 2010 Grammy.com Classical Nominees
- 2010 Grammy Nomination for Best Instrumental Soloist(s) Performance (with orchestra) 2010 Grammy.com Classical Nominees
- 2008 Grammy Nomination for Best Instrumental Soloist(s) Performance (with orchestra)
- 2007 Grammy Award for Best Instrumental Soloist(s) Performance (with orchestra)
- 2006 Grammy Nomination for Best Instrumental Soloist(s) Performance (with orchestra)

== Discography ==
As a conductor:

- Deon Nielsen Price : Yellow Jade Banquet and other Orchestral Works
- Ernest Bloch; Violin Concerto, Benjamin Lees: Violin Concerto (2008 Grammy Nominee)
- Nicolas Flagello : Missa Sinfonico, Arnold Rosner: Symphony No.5 Missa sine Cantoribus super Salve Regina
- Olivier Messiaen : Oiseaux Exotiques (2007 Grammy Winner)
- Nicolas Flagello : Violin Concerto / Orchestral Excerpts from the Operas / Orchestral Songs
- John Alden Carpenter : Adventures in a Perambulator / Symphonies Nos. 1 and 2
- Nicolas Flagello : Piano Concerto No. 1 / Dante's Farewell / Concerto Sinfonico
- Henry Kimball Hadley: Symphony No. 4 / The Ocean / The Culprit Fay
- George Frederick McKay : From a Moonlit Ceremony / Harbor Narrative
- George Frederick McKay : Violin Concerto / Sinfonietta No. 4 / Song Over the Great Plains
- Quincy Porter : Viola Concerto (2010 Grammy Nominee)
- Corentin Boissier : Glamour Concerto / Philip Marlowe Concerto

As a violinist:

- Samuel Coleridge-Taylor : Chamber Music; Nonet, Fantasiestucke, Five Negro Melodies for Piano Trio
- Chevalier de Saint-Georges : Six String Quartets
