= Red (an orchestra) =

American chamber orchestra

Red {an orchestra}, 2007

Red {an orchestra} was an American chamber orchestra based in Cleveland, Ohio.

Established in 2001, its artistic director and conductor was Jonathan Sheffer. The orchestra's repertoire spanned the work of Renaissance composers including Heinrich Schütz to contemporary classical composers including Frank Zappa, John Corigliano, and Sheffer himself. Red also engaged in innovative multimedia collaborations with film, puppetry, visual art, narration, and other art forms.

Red {an orchestra} received reviews in The Plain Dealer and the Akron Beacon Journal.

The orchestra suspended operations in March 2008 due to financial difficulties.

== See also ==
- Cleveland Chamber Symphony
- CityMusic Cleveland
- Cleveland Orchestra
- Cleveland Philharmonic
- Cleveland Women's Orchestra
