= Cleveland Philharmonic Orchestra =

American orchestra in Cleveland, Ohio, US

The Cleveland Philharmonic Orchestra (also called Cleveland Philharmonic) is an American orchestra based in Cleveland, Ohio. It was founded in 1938, and its current music director is Dean Buck.

The Cleveland Philharmonic Orchestra is a full symphony orchestra which was founded in 1938 by three Cleveland area musicians — bass clarinetist Alfred Zetzer, oboist Robert Zupnik, and cellist Irving Klein — who all went on to professional careers. Initially, the orchestra was formed as a young people's symphony, to give concerts and to serve as a training ground for those who were interested in professional careers as orchestra musicians.

The orchestra comprises about 60 musicians and performs 4 different programs at venues in greater Cleveland.

The Cleveland Philharmonic's current acting music director, Dean Buck, took over in the fall of 2025.

The philharmonic has traditionally presented outstanding Cleveland area musicians as well as members of the world renowned Cleveland Orchestra as soloists. Annually, since 1973, the philharmonic has sponsored the Frieda Schumacher Young Artist Competition. This statewide competition is open to music students of high school age who audition for a cash award and the opportunity of performing a full length concerto with the orchestra at one of its regular season concerts. Some recent winners are:

2026 - Nicholas Jacques, cello 2025 – James Carson, piano 2024 – Louis Wang, piano 2023 – Marina Ziegler, violin 2022 – Moshi Tang, violin 2021 – No competition held 2020 – Ania Lewis, cello 2019 – Christina Nam, violin 2018 – Abhik Mazumder, piano 2017 – Celina Bethoux, violin 2016 – Henry Shapard, cello

Over the years, Cleveland, American, and world premieres of new music have been presented by the Cleveland Philharmonic Orchestra.

Beyond the regular season, the philharmonic has become involved in various community activities. It was the first symphonic group in Cleveland to honor Martin Luther King Jr. This annual concert was a tradition at Cuyahoga Community College attracting capacity audiences for many years until being discontinued by Cuyahoga Community College.

SYMPHONIC JOURNEY, Con Amore, a History of the Cleveland Philharmonic Orchestra was published in 2003. It was written by Robert Finn, former music critic of The Plain Dealer, freelance writer, teacher, lecturer and arts advocate. The book recounts the orchestra's 1938 founding and history in detail and contains many photographs and reproductions of early philharmonic programs and newspaper reviews. There are extensive appendices that list players, conductors, repertory and winners of the orchestra's Young Artist Competition through the years.

The Cleveland Philharmonic Orchestra mission statement reads as follows:

- To provide amateur and professional musicians the means and opportunity to explore, learn and perform symphonic music.
- To regularly feature renowned professional and outstanding student musicians as soloists in collaboration with the orchestra.
- To perform concerts which make musical enrichment accessible to all in the Greater Cleveland area.

== Music directors ==
- F. Karl Grossman (1938–1963)
- George Cleve (1964–1965)
- Zoltán Rozsnyai (1965–1968)
- José Serebrier (1968–1971)
- Robert Marcellus (1971–1977)
- John Ross (1977–1979)
- William B. Slocum (1981–2007), Director Emeritus (2007 – 2015 )
- Victor H. Liva (2007–2025)
- Dean Buck (2025 - 2026) Music Director

== See also ==
- Cleveland Orchestra
- Cleveland Women's Orchestra
- CityMusic Cleveland
- Cleveland Chamber Symphony
- Red (an orchestra)
