= Amit Peled =

Israeli-American musician

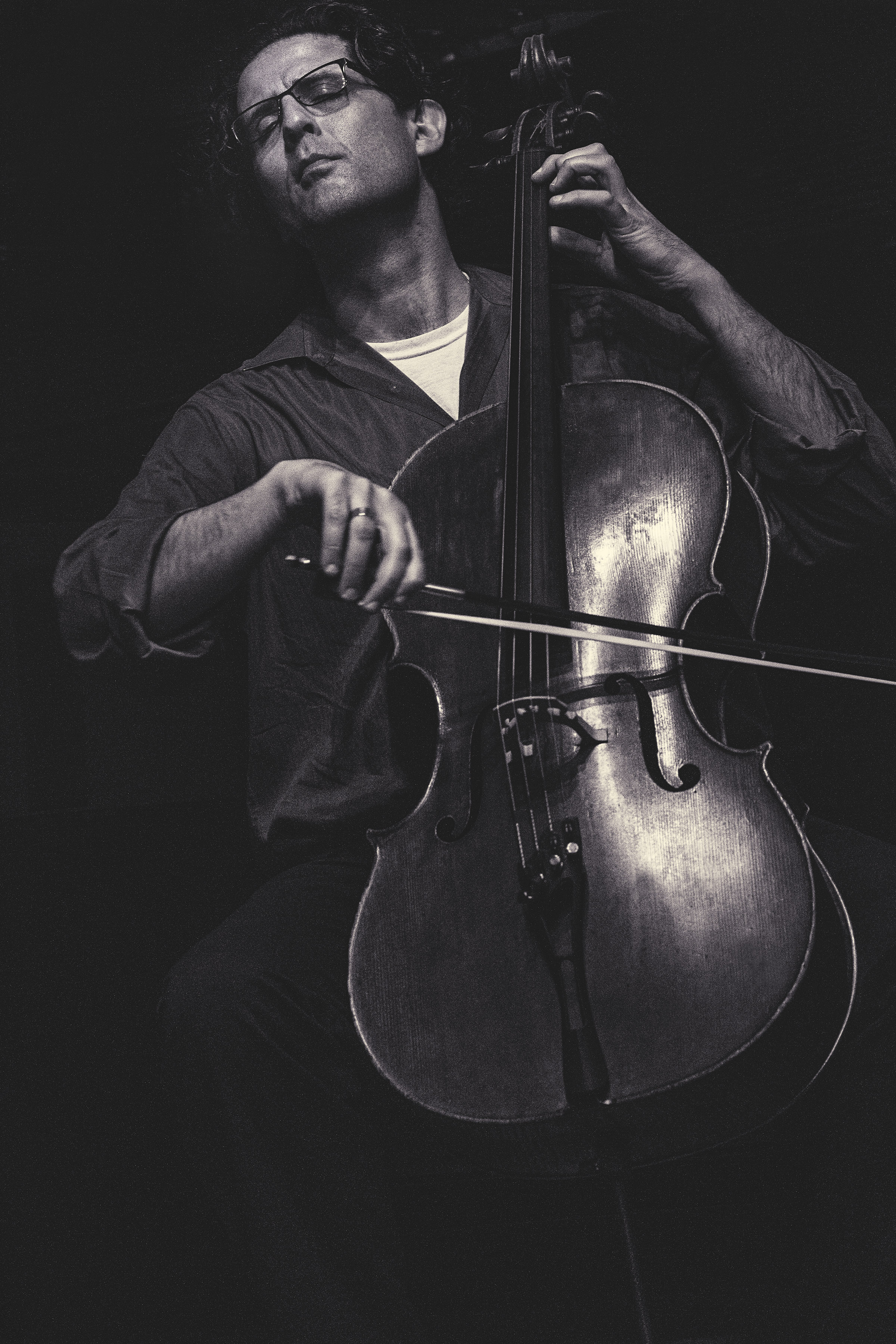
Amit Peled, Cellist

Amit Peled (born 1973) is an Israeli-American cellist, conductor, and pedagogue. He plays a ca. 1695 Grancino cello on loan from the Roux Family Foundation. From 2012-2018 he played Pablo Casals's 1733 Matteo Goffriller cello. Prior to Casals's cello, Peled played a 1689 Andrea Guarneri cello.

Amit Peled's two critically acclaimed CDs The Jewish Soul and Cellobration were released under the Centaur Records label. His third CD with Centaur Records, Reflections, was released in September 2012.

He released recordings of five of Bach's Cello Suites on the albums Bach Suites 1–3 (2018) and Solus et Una (2022) and Brahms' Cello Sonatas on To Brahms, with Love: From the Cello of Pablo Casals (2018).

At a height of 6'5”, Peled started out as a basketball player and was called "larger than life" when he enveloped his Guarneri cello and "Jacqueline du Pré in a farmer's body." Peled often surprises audiences with the ways he breaks down barriers between performers and the public, making classical music more accessible to wider audiences through explanations, jokes, and even with a basketball game challenge.

Peled was a student of Bernard Greenhouse and is now a sought-after pedagogue of cello at Peabody Institute. When he began there, he was the youngest professor at a top musical institution.

Amit Peled is Online Master Teacher at iClassical Academy with whom he has recorded several online Masterclasses.

Peled also collaborates with pianist Alon Goldstein and clarinetist Alexander Fiterstein in the Goldstein-Peled-Fiterstein Trio as well as with pianist Alon Goldstein and violinist Ilya Kaler in the Tempest Trio.

He also has been named Music Director for CityMusic Cleveland for the 2019-2020 season. His students include Frances G. Borowsky.
