= George Frederick McKay =

American composer

George Frederick McKay (June 11, 1899 – October 4, 1970) was a prolific modern American composer.

== Biography ==
McKay was born in the small frontier wheat farming town of Harrington, Washington. His family later moved to Spokane, where he attended school up to his college years. He was attracted to American folk-song, including jazz and blues and Native American themes, and to a great degree, his music contains a poignant evocation of the West Coast American spirit, including glimpses of a populist era of street marches, honky-tonk dance halls and social chaos along with a recognition of the great natural beauty of his home region and the vitality of its people (i.e. Harbor Narrative-1934). He admired composers who involved national folk-culture in their music, e.g. Heitor Villa-Lobos, Carlos Chávez, William Grant Still, Antonín Dvořák and Béla Bartók. Many of McKay's symphonic works center on folk themes and include pieces dedicated to Native American music.

He was famous for his intellectual and moral support of young composers who studied with him in Seattle, such as William Bolcom, Goddard Lieberson and Earl Robinson.

He also founded the Composition Department at the University of Washington, where he was a professor of music for more than 40 years.

He composed works in various styles, including 70 orchestral works and nearly 1,000 musical titles, including songs, chamber works, romantic violin and cello sonatas, "ultramodern" dance music, jazzy piano pieces, band rhapsodies, string quartets, light opera tunes, folk music suites for string orchestra, large choral works, organ pieces and American symphonies. He composed several volumes of music for children and was a serious advocate for music education in the United States. He continued actively composing during his retirement years at Lake Tahoe, Nev. and also wrote some pieces influenced by travel to Japan in the 1960s. Some of his early orchestral works attracted conductors such as Leopold Stokowski, Sir Thomas Beecham, Arthur Benjamin, Karl Krueger, Fabien Sevitsky and Howard Hanson for live performances in the 1930s and 1940s. His music has recently been recorded by performers such as William Bolcom and John McLaughlin Williams with the NRCU Symphony Orchestra and now is being heard worldwide via radio broadcasts and international performances. McKay also conducted the Seattle Symphony on several occasions.

McKay wrote a number of papers and books on musical technique, including "Creative Orchestration," "The Technique of Modern Harmony" and "Creative Harmony."

== Education ==
George Frederick McKay was the first graduate in composition studies at the Eastman School of Music in Rochester, N.Y., in 1923, where he studied under Christian Sinding and Selim Palmgren. McKay attributed his appreciation of pure melody and the importance of folk culture to his association with Sinding, with whom he corresponded over several decades until Sinding's death. McKay later authored a poignant article concerning Sinding's time in America for Etude Magazine (November 1944 issue). Palmgren nominated McKay's violin sonata, composed at Eastman, for the Pulitzer Prize. Howard Hanson invited McKay back to Eastman many times between 1925 and 1960 for performances of the composer's music. McKay's "From the Black Hills" was performed by the Eastman Symphony and conducted by Hanson in the first American Composers Festival at Eastman in 1925, along with an early work by Aaron Copland and music of other contemporary composers. McKay's initial college studies began in accounting at Washington State University, and continued in music at the University of Washington under Carl Paige Wood. In his early student days in Seattle, the young composer experimented with jazz, ragtime and romantic art songs.

== Work at the University of Washington ==
In 1927, Carl Paige Wood brought McKay back to the University of Washington as a new faculty member. McKay began a four-decade tenure of composing, teaching and leading performing groups in concerts of contemporary and American works in the Seattle metropolitan area. His compositions were performed by orchestras in Philadelphia, Boston, Indianapolis, Rochester, Washington D.C. (Smithsonian), Vancouver, B.C. (CBR Radio), New York (NBC Radio) and Los Angeles over the years, and the Seattle Symphony premiered several of his works, between 1930 and 1970, with the composer conducting in some performances. In 1952, McKay was commissioned by the Seattle Symphony to compose the city's Centennial Symphony, now known as "Evocation Symphony" or "Symphony for Seattle". This work has been professionally recorded by the National Symphony of Ukraine with John McLaughlin Williams conducting. Williams has been a strong advocate for McKay's orchestral music and has recorded seven of McKay symphonies, including the lively Native-American-influenced piece "From A Moonlit Ceremony" (premiered by Leopold Stokowski in 1946) and "Harbor Narrative", a portrayal of the Northwest Maritime scene from the early 20th century.

== Significant students ==
McKay's students at the University of Washington included future winners of the Pulitzer Prize, Academy Award, Guggenheim Grant and Grammy Award. These students include William Bolcom, Goddard Lieberson, Earl Robinson, Ken Benshoof, and Gerald Kechley. McKay himself was awarded a Guggenheim Grant to study in Europe in the 1920s but turned it down to stay in touch with his American musical roots and to care for his growing young family. His early teaching assignments took him to North Carolina, South Dakota and Missouri before he finally settled in Seattle; and he composed music celebrating all these locations. Music related to the Dakotas by McKay is still in publication.

== Professional recordings ==
McKay's music is currently recorded professionally by NAXOS on four albums, including two symphonic CDs conducted by John McLaughlin Williams. More symphonic works were issued in 2008, including his hour-length American Dance Symphony, "Epoch", which celebrates four American poets (Poe, Lanier, Whitman, and Sandburg) and their place in history. "Epoch" was recently recorded by the University of Kentucky Symphony Orchestra conducted by John Nardolillo. William Bolcom, McKay's former student at the University of Washington, has recorded several early McKay jazz-influenced works and art songs on the piano. Brian Reagin has recorded McKay's violin concerto for an album that also includes "Suite on 16th Century Hymn Tunes," which demonstrates McKay's mastery of string music and love of melodic themes. McKay's prize-winning suite, "Medieval Dances for Flute and Harp", was released on Cantilena Records, performed by Laurel Zucker, on the flute, and Susan Jolles, harp. This work has been performed widely in concert, including at the World Harp Conference venue. For Abraham Lincoln’s bicentennial, Leonard Slatkin performed and recorded McKay's "To A Liberator (A Lincoln Portrait)” with the Nashville Symphony on NAXOS Records (February 2009).

== Significant performances ==
Important historic performances of McKay's music have been presented by Leopold Stokowski with the Hollywood Bowl Orchestra, Howard Hanson with the Eastman/Rochester Symphony, Frederick Fennell at Eastman, Arthur Fiedler with the Boston Civic Orchestra, Sir Thomas Beecham, Karl Krueger, and Milton Katims with the Seattle Symphony, Richard Hickox at Seattle Symphony, Arthur Benjamin with the CBC Symphony in Vancouver, British Columbia, Canada, Carmen Dragon with Los Angeles and San Francisco Symphony players, and Fabien Sevitzky with the Indianapolis Symphony and Boston Civic Symphony.

McKay's orchestral music was first broadcast in 1929 on NBC in a performance of his Caricature Dance Suite by Nat Shilkret's Orchestra. In following decades, live performances of his music were heard on virtually all the national radio networks, including his string quartet No. 1, which was presented in the 1930s by the Kreiner Quartet on NBC. The players in this quartet were from Arturo Toscanini's radio symphony of the time. Also notable are several performances of McKay's folk music by the National Gallery of Art Symphony, under the direction of Richard Bales. Many of these concerts were broadcast and took place from the 1940s to the 1960s. McKay's symphonic music was also performed by the National Symphony Orchestra in Washington, D. C. during the 1940s.

His organ sonata No. 1 was the National Prize Winner for 1939 and received a performance at the American Guild of Organists meeting the same year. McKay's symphonic work "From the Black Hills" was conducted by Howard Hanson at the First American Composers Festival in 1925 in Rochester, N.Y.

== Work elsewhere ==
McKay held the Alchin Chair of Music at the University of Southern California in the summer of 1939, succeeding Arnold Schoenberg and Howard Hanson in that capacity, and returned to teach at USC for two more visiting sessions in later years. He also had visiting professorships at Oregon, Michigan and Drake. He was concerned with environmental and humanitarian issues throughout his life and especially the cause of world peace. His music evidences a sensitivity to the beauty of nature and the spiritual side of mankind.

== Work with the Seattle Symphony ==
The composer also conducted several premieres of his works with the Seattle Symphony and was a guest conductor with the CBC Orchestra in Vancouver. He led a community chamber orchestra in Seattle in the 1930s and occasionally conducted the University of Washington Symphony during his tenure at the School of Music (1927–1968).
