= Frances G. Borowsky =

American cellist (born 1992)

Frances Grace Borowsky
- Born: 5 July 1992 (age 32); Baltimore, Maryland
- Occupation: Cellist
- Mother: Cecylia Barczyk

Frances Grace Borowsky (born 5 July 1992) is an American cellist. She has performed as a soloist in over thirty countries, including some of the world's leading concert venues. She made her debut at Carnegie Hall in 2004. Borowsky won the Erick Friedman Prize for Outstanding Young Musicians in 2004 and has received several other awards. She is also known for her cooperation with her siblings, violinist Emmanuel Borowsky and pianist Elizabeth Borowsky, in The Borowsky Trio. She is a daughter of the noted Polish-born cellist Cecylia Barczyk who defected to the United States in 1981. Borowsky began performing professionally before the age of 10. She studied with Cecylia Barczyk, Amit Peled, Eric Kutz and Alexander Huelshoff, and earned a doctorate of musical arts at the University of Maryland in 2019.

== Awards ==
- Erick Friedman Prize for Outstanding Young Musicians, 2004
- Grace Clagett Ranney Prize for Excellence in Chamber Music, 2013
- Runner up of the 2018–2019 UMD Symphony Orchestra Concerto Competition
