= Cecylia Barczyk =

American cellist

- Born: Cecylia Barczyk
- Origin: Bytom, Poland
- Occupation: Cellist
- Instrument: Cello
- Website: CecyliaBarczyk.com

Cecylia Barczyk is an American cellist based in Baltimore, Maryland.

== Education and early life ==
Barczyk was born in Bytom, Poland and began studying cello at a young age. She studied at the Chopin Academy of Music (Warsaw), Moscow Conservatory of Music.

In 1977, she went to study at Yale School of Music and in 1981 applied for political asylum in the United States saying that

I can't live in a country without democracy. My hopes have been with the Solidarity movement. To this end I have given many concerts in its support. And I want to continue my mission to assist the people of Poland in their struggle.

Three months later, the U.S. Government granted her asylum.

== Awards and prizes ==
Barczyk won prizes at the Danczowski Cello Competition (Poznań), Pablo Casals Cello Competition (Budapest), Tchaikovsky Competition (Moscow), Aldo Parisot International Cello Competition (Brazil), J.S. Bach International Competition (Leipzig), Cassado International Cello Competition (Florence), and W.C. Byrd Young Artists Competition (Michigan).

The Maryland Chapter of the American String Teachers Association twice voted her "Teacher of the Year" (1995 and 2004). The Tianjin Conservatory of Music (China) named her a "Distinguished Honorary Professor." The International Friends of the Cello Association honored her with the "Award for Great Achievements in Cello Music." The International Music Tribute to Paderewski Committee honored her with the "Paderewki Award for Contributions to Society and Culture." The Minister of Culture of the Republic of Poland presented her with a medal of recognition for outstanding musical achievement.

== Teaching ==
Since 1983, she has been Professor of Cello at Towson University (Maryland). Several of her students have received top prizes in national/international music competitions (including the Kumho International Competition in Helsinki, the Young Concert Artists Auditions of New York, and the Corpus Christi Young Artists Competition). She is a frequent adjudicator of international music competitions, and a regular faculty member of advanced summer music courses in the US and Europe. In 2003 she was appointed artistic director of the International Music Institute and Festival USA.

== International Cello festivals ==
In 1986, Barczyk founded the International Cello Festival at Towson University. As Director of this festival, she has organized this festival on an annual basis, inviting renowned guest artists as well as talented young cellists. Recent festivals have had themed concerts, such as "Music for the Mind, Feet, and Soul," "Music from Vietnam," "Music from Iceland," and "Music for Peace in the Middle East." The 2006 festival included the world premiere of a composition by the American composer Jody Nagel for two cellos and orchestra (performed together with her daughter, Frances Borowsky). Barczyk has also been among the organizers of the World Cello Congresses in St. Petersburg and Baltimore. She also serves as a co-chair for the 2010 American Tribute to Chopin.

== Personal life ==
Barczyk married social scientist Dr. Charles Karol H. Borowsky, President of Intermuse Performing Artists Bureau. Borowsky has organized many international conferences and festivals dedicated to the promotion of music as a tool for cultural, social, and economic progress. He also plays the harmonica and occasionally performs together with his family. They have three children, all of who are professional musicians, among them Frances G. Borowsky. In a 2012 profile for The Catholic Review, Barczyk noted the ties between her family's music and their Catholic faith.
