= CityMusic Cleveland =

American chamber orchestra

- Chamber orchestra
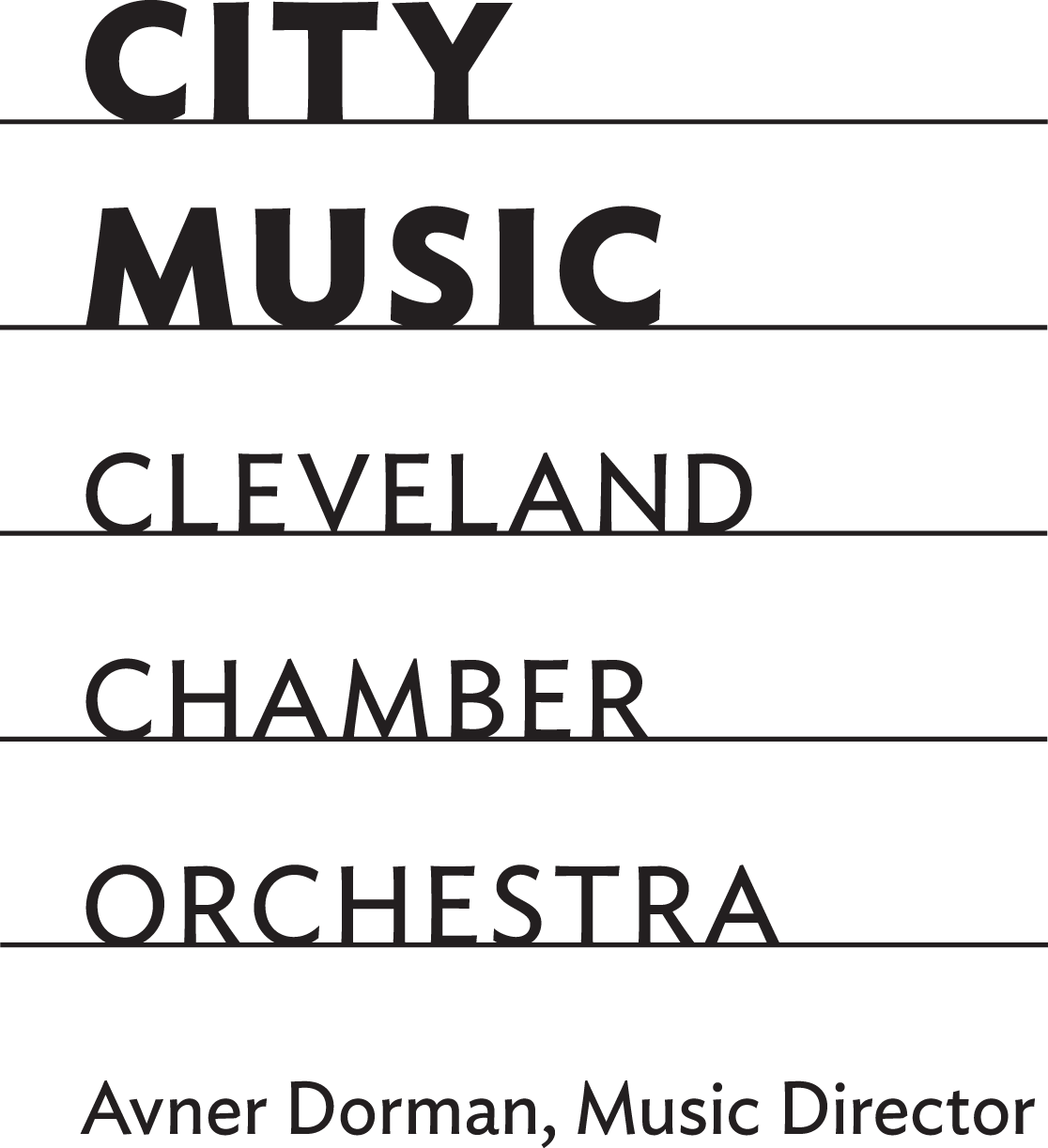
- Official logo
- Founded: 2004
- Principal conductor: Amit Peled
- Website: www.citymusiccleveland.org

CityMusic Cleveland is an American chamber orchestra based in Cleveland, Ohio. It was founded in the summer of 2004 to give free concerts throughout the Northeast Ohio area. Composed of professional free-lance musicians from the Cleveland area and beyond, the orchestra partners with community leaders, mayors, council members, and local civic organizations, to expand the audience for cultural events. Concerts are accompanied, occasionally, by art exhibits, featuring local and regional artists.

James Gaffigan was the orchestra's music director in July 2005 till January 2010. Avner Dorman, well-known composer, was appointed music director in July, 2013. The orchestra's flexible membership ranges between 34 and 44 performers.

Posted Oct 21, 2019, cellist-conductor Amit Peled has begun his tenure as music director of CityMusic Cleveland.

CityMusic Cleveland has been reviewed and/or featured in The Plain Dealer, "Symphony Magazine", Gramophone, Northern Ohio Live, and the Continental Airlines magazine, among other publications.

== Recordings ==
- Mostly Mozart (CMC1) featuring guest conductor Andrea Raffanini and violin soloist Kyung Sun Lee: a live recording of the début concert (October 24, 2004), including Wolfgang Amadeus Mozart's Violin Concerto No. 5 in A Major (K. 219) and Symphony #40 in G Minor (K. 550), plus Brian Suit's arrangement and variations on George Gershwin's "I've Got Rhythm."
- Beethoven • Respighi • Rossini • Mascagni (CMC2) featuring music director James Gaffigan: excerpts recorded live in concert during 2005 and 2006, including Gioachino Rossini's Overture to The Barber of Seville; Ludwig van Beethoven's Triple Concerto in C Major (Op. 56) with violinist Kyung Sun Lee, cellist Edward Arron, and pianist Daniel Shapiro; Pietro Mascagni's Intermezzo sinfonico from Cavalleria rusticana; and Ottorino Respighi's Trittico Botticelliano.
- On the Move (CMC3), featuring music director James Gaffigan: excerpts recorded live in concert during 2005 and 2006, including Giuseppe Verdi's Prelude to Act I of La traviata; Franz Schubert's Overture in C Major (D.591); Ermanno Wolf-Ferrari's Intermezzo #1 from The Jewels of the Madonna; Joseph Haydn's Symphony #49 in F Minor; Franz Schubert's Symphony #5 in B-flat Major (D. 485); Jean Sibelius's incidental music for Pelléas et Mélisande; and Gioachino Rossini's Overture to L'italiana in Algeri.
- CityMusic LIVE (CMC4), featuring music director James Gaffigan and concertmaster Michi Wiancko: recorded live in concert during May 2007, featuring the world premiere of Margaret Brouwer's Concerto for Violin and Chamber Orchestra, commissioned by CityMusic Cleveland; Igor Stravinsky's Danses concertantes; and Wolfgang Amadeus Mozart's Symphony no. 39 in E-flat Major (K. 543).

== See also ==
- Cleveland Chamber Symphony
- Red (an orchestra)
- Cleveland Orchestra
- Cleveland Philharmonic
- Cleveland Women's Orchestra
