= Cleveland Women's Orchestra =

American female orchestra in Ohio, founded 1935

The Cleveland Women's Orchestra is an American orchestra made up entirely of female musicians, based in Cleveland, Ohio. It was founded in 1935 and performed its first concert in 1936. It is one of the oldest women's orchestra in the world after the Orchestre féminin de Paris (founded in 1930).

The orchestra's music director from its founding was Hyman Schandler. Schandler, also a violinist in the Cleveland Orchestra, continued as conductor into the 1980s. He was followed by Robert Cronquist, and Jungho Kim. The current music director is Eric Benjamin.

== See also ==
- Cleveland Orchestra
- Cleveland Philharmonic Orchestra
- Cleveland Chamber Symphony
- CityMusic Cleveland
- Red {an orchestra}
