= Angelin Chang =

American lawyer

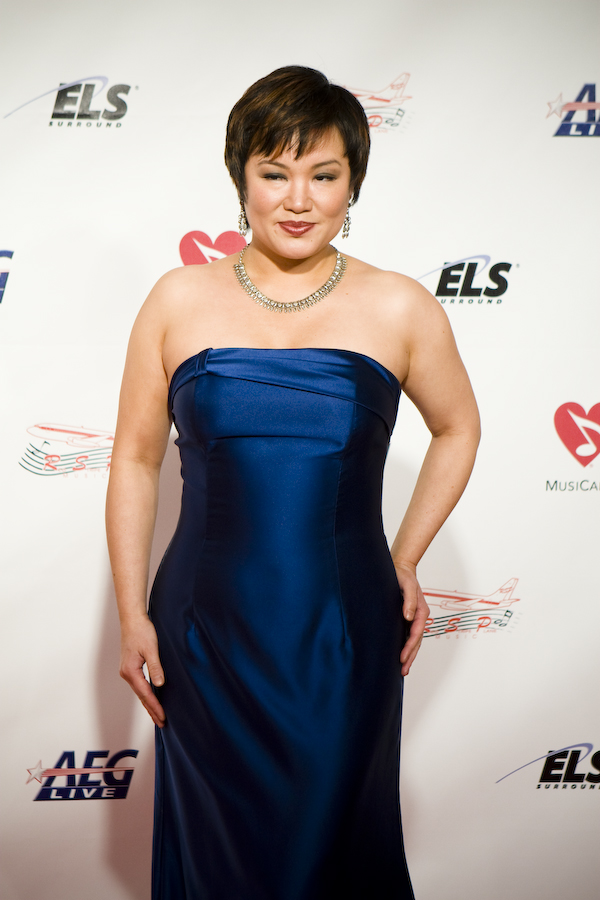
- Chang in 2009
- Born: Muncie, Indiana
- Education: Ball State University (BM, BA); Indiana University Bloomington (MM); Johns Hopkins University (DMA); Cleveland State University (JD)
- Occupations: Professor, Pianist
- Known for: First American awarded Premier Prix Piano and Premier Prix Musique de Chambre

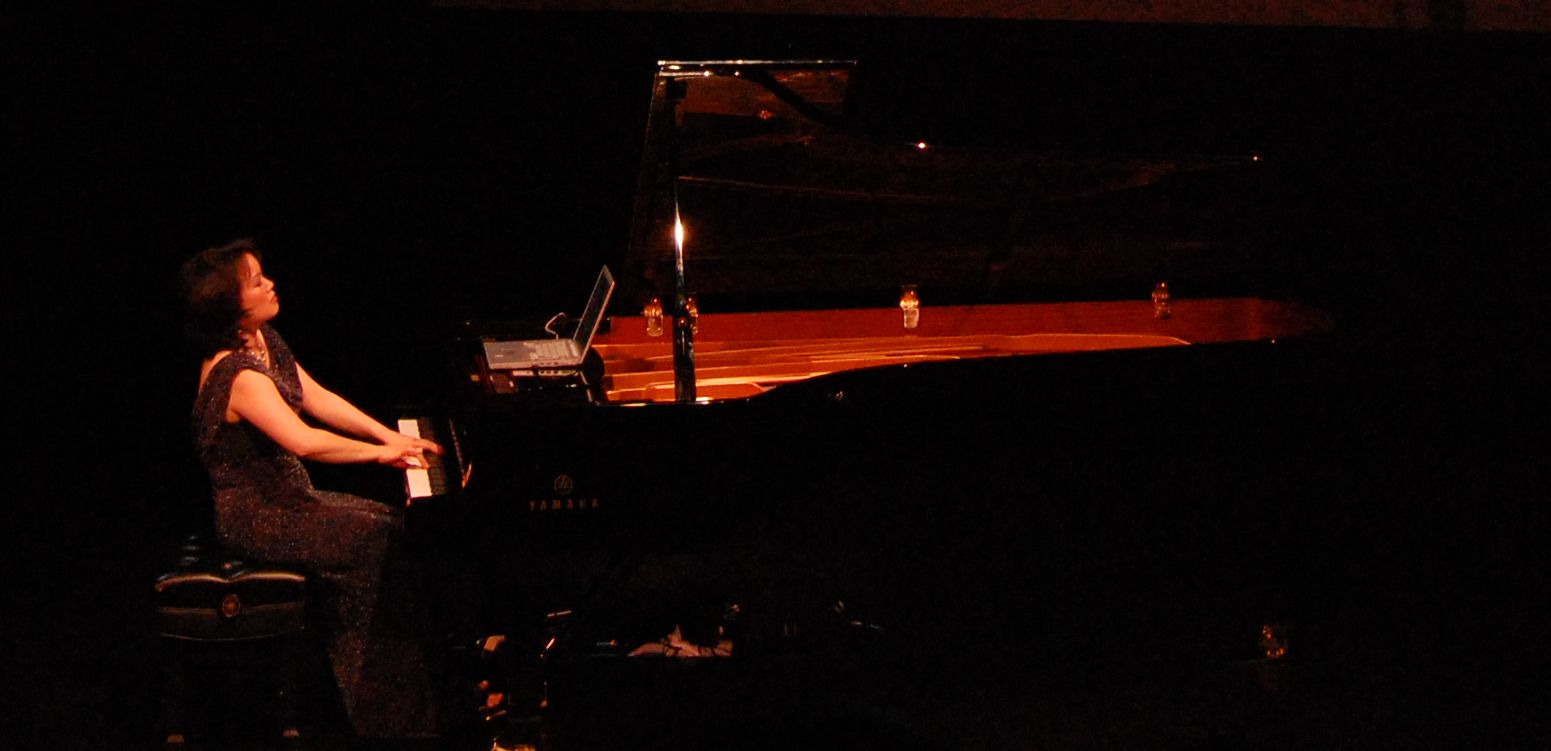
Angelin Chang performing, July 25, 2008.

Angelin Chang (張安麟, Chinese: 张安麟; pinyin: Zhāng Ānlín; Korean: 장 安 린) is a classical pianist and professor of music at Cleveland State University. She heads the university's keyboard studies program coordinates the university's chamber music program, and teaches music and law. Prior to joining Cleveland State, she was a faculty member at Rutgers University.

Chang's debut performance as a piano soloist was with the Muncie Symphony Orchestra, at age 12. She is the first Artist-in-residence at the Kennedy Center in Washington D.C., and the first Academic Performing Artist for Yamaha Corporation of America.

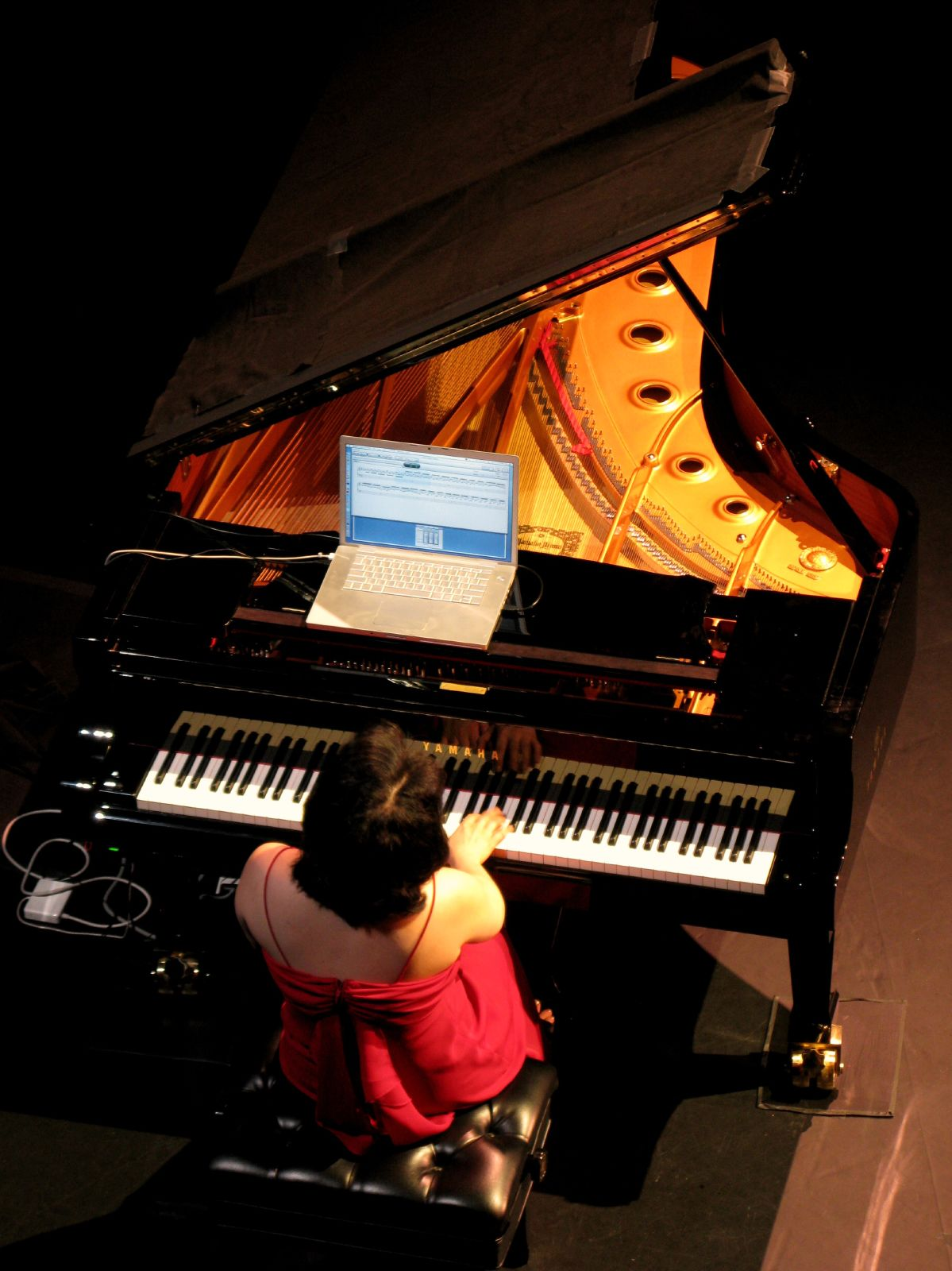
Angelin Chang performing, July 26, 2008.

Chang performed on and produced two of her CDs: Soaring Spirit (2004) and Angelín (2007). In 2007, she won the Grammy Award for Best Instrumental Soloist Performance with Orchestra for her recording of Olivier Messiaen's Oiseaux exotiques (Exotic Birds) with the Cleveland Chamber Symphony, conducted by John McLaughlin Williams. She is the first female American classical pianist and the first pianist of Asian descent to win a Grammy.

Chang was born in Muncie, Indiana, and attended Burris Laboratory School there. Chang graduated with top honors from the Interlochen Arts Academy and received a Bachelor of Music from Ball State University, and a Master of Music degree, along with a distinguished Performer's Certificate, from the Jacobs School of Music at Indiana University Bloomington. She earned a Doctor of Musical Arts degree at Peabody Conservatory, at Johns Hopkins University. She is the first American awarded Premier Prix diploma Piano and Premier Prix diploma Musique de Chambre in the same year from the Conservatoire National Supérieur de Musique de Paris (France).

In addition to her musical degrees, Chang has a Bachelor of Arts degree in French from Ball State University and a Juris Doctor from the Cleveland State University College of Law. Chang is vice president and on the Board of Governors of The Recording Academy Chicago Chapter, serving as Chair of the Education Committee and Classical Task Force.
