= Cleveland Chamber Symphony =

American chamber orchestra in Cleveland, Ohio

- Orchestra
- Short name: CCS
- Founded: 1980
- Concert hall: Gamble Auditorium, Baldwin-Wallace University
- Music director: Steven Smith
- Website: ClevelandChamberSymphony.org

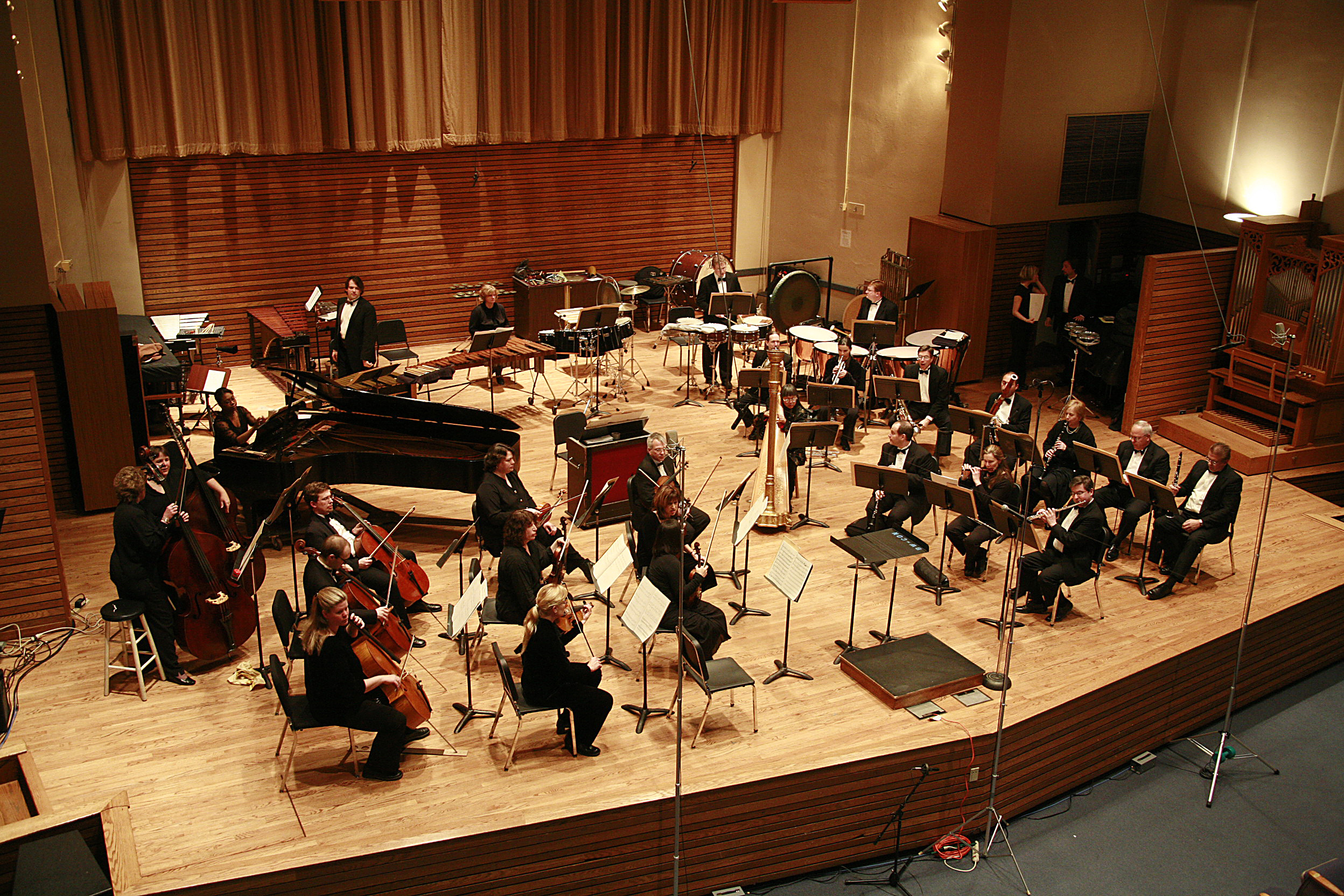
The Cleveland Chamber Symphony preparing to perform.

The Cleveland Chamber Symphony (CCS) is an American chamber orchestra based in Cleveland, Ohio, specializing in the performance of contemporary classical music. Since its founding, the CCS has premiered more than 200 works. The ensemble is affiliated with the Baldwin Wallace Conservatory of Music.

== History ==
The Cleveland Chamber Symphony was founded in 1980 by composer Edwin London. Under his direction, the ensemble performed, recorded, and commissioned contemporary orchestral works, primarily by American composers.

Performances by the Cleveland Chamber Symphony have taken place at Cleveland State University, the Cleveland Museum of Art, Trinity Cathedral, Public Hall, Karamu House, Liberty Hill Baptist Church, Old Stone Church, and John Carroll University. The ensemble also performed in communities adjacent to Cuyahoga County and throughout the Midwest.

The CCS has commissioned and performed works by national and international composers, who have often been invited to serve as guest conductors and educators. Following a national tour, the CCS performed Bernard Rands' Canti Trilogy at Harvard University.

In 2007, the group won a Grammy Award for Best Instrumental Soloist(s) Performance for its recording of Olivier Messiaen's Oiseaux exotiques, conducted by John McLaughlin Williams with pianist Angelin Chang.

The current music director of the Cleveland Chamber Symphony is Steven Smith, who has served as the symphony's director since 2004.

Originally formed at Cleveland State University, the CCS is now based at the Cleveland Music School Settlement. The ensemble sponsors an annual concert highlighting student compositions, titled the "Young and Emerging Composers Concert."

== Select recordings ==
Sound Encounters I (GM 2039)

1. Libby Larsen: What the Monster Saw
2. Salvatore Martirano: LON/dons - Howie Smith, saxophone
3. Bernard Rands: London Serenade
4. Roger Reynolds: The Dream of the Infinite Rooms - Regina Mushabac, cello

The New American Scene (Albany Records, Troy 298)

1. Ronald Perera: Music for Flute and Orchestra - William Wittig, flute
2. Howie Smith: Songs for the Children - Howie Smith, wind controller/alto saxophone
3. Edwin London: Una Novella Della Sera Primavera - Harry Sargous, oboe
4. John Eaton: Songs of Desperation & Comfort - Nelda Nelson, mezzo-soprano

Cleveland Chamber Symphony Vol 6 (TNC CD 1515)

1. Danceanu: Chinonic, Op. 67
2. Messiaen: Oiseaux Exotiques (Exotic Birds)- Angelin Chang- piano
3. Ligeti: Chamber Concerto for 13 Instrumentalists
4. Shostakovich: Concerto no. 1 for Piano and Orchestra, Op. 35- Angelin Chang, piano

== See also ==
- City Music Cleveland
- Cleveland Orchestra
- Cleveland Philharmonic
- Cleveland Women's Orchestra
