= Cleveland Orchestra =

American symphony orchestra in Cleveland, Ohio

- Orchestra
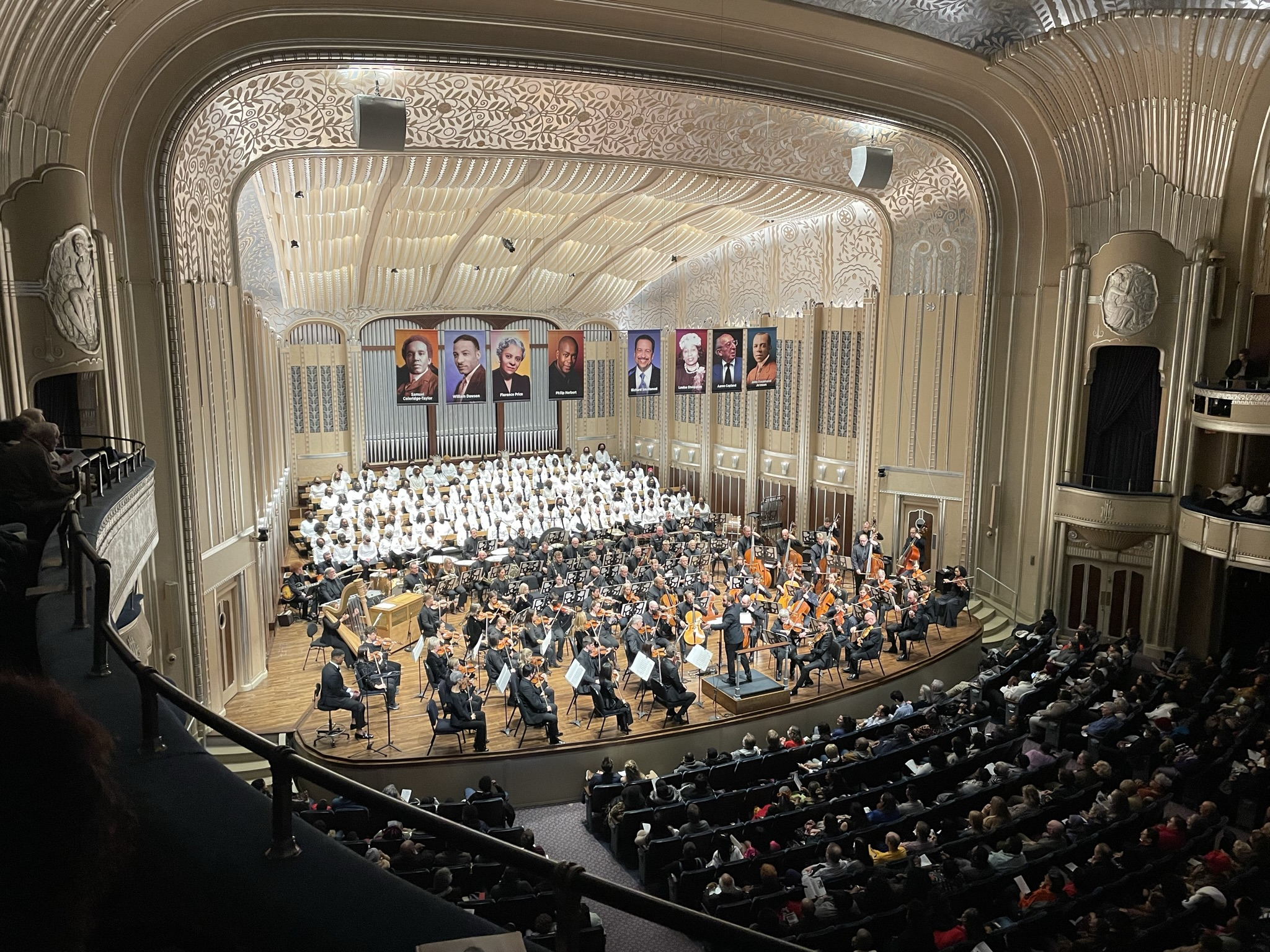
- The Cleveland Orchestra performs at Severance Hall in 2023
- Founded: 1918; 108 years ago
- Location: Cleveland, Ohio, United States
- Concert hall: Severance Hall
- Music director: Franz Welser-Möst
- Website: clevelandorchestra.com
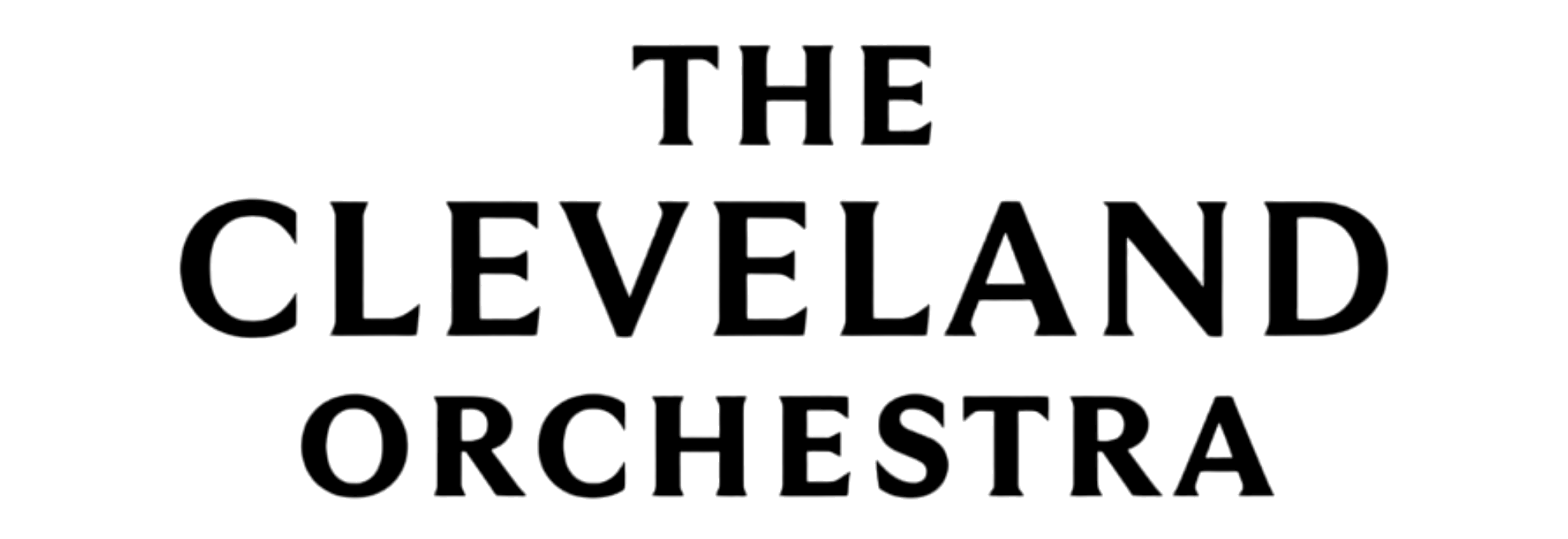

The Cleveland Orchestra is an American orchestra based in Cleveland, Ohio, United States. Founded in 1918 by the pianist and impresario Adella Prentiss Hughes, the orchestra is one of the five American orchestras informally referred to as the "Big Five". The orchestra plays most of its concerts at Severance Music Center. Its music director is Franz Welser-Möst.

== History ==
=== Founding and early history (1918–1945) ===
The Cleveland Orchestra was founded in 1918 by music-aficionado Adella Prentiss Hughes, businessman John L. Severance, Father John Powers, music critic Archie Bell, and Russian-American violinist and conductor Nikolai Sokoloff, who became the orchestra's first music director. A former pianist, Hughes served as a local music promoter and sponsored a series of "Symphony Orchestra Concerts" designed to bring top-notch orchestral music to Cleveland. In 1915, she helped found the Musical Arts Association, which presented Cleveland performances of the Ballets Russes in 1916 and Richard Wagner's Siegfried at the Cleveland Indians' League Park a few months later After a great deal of planning and fundraising, The Cleveland Orchestra's inaugural concert was performed on December 11, 1918, at Grays Armory.

Three events occurred in 1921 that proved significant in the orchestra's early development:

- The ensemble presented its inaugural children's concert, which began a long-standing tradition of performing for young people from local schools.
- The Women's Committee of The Cleveland Orchestra was founded, a group which focused largely on internal affairs, including organization and branding; the Women's Committee was also the driving force behind the creation of the orchestra's education-oriented Key Concerts series decades later.
- The orchestra performed its first concert in New York City that year, at the Hippodrome Theatre, a demonstration that the orchestra was committed to embarking on major activities from early in its existence.

In 1922, the orchestra again traveled to New York for its first concert at Carnegie Hall. Later that year, the orchestra performed its first radio broadcast and, in 1924, issued its first recording — a shortened version of Tchaikovsky's 1812 Overture for the Brunswick label under Sokoloff's direction. By the end of the 1920s, the Musical Arts Association began planning for a permanent concert hall for the orchestra. Board president John L. Severance and his wife, Elisabeth, pledged $1 million(equivalent to $18,750,000 in 2025) toward the construction of a new hall, and the groundbreaking ceremony took place in November 1929, a few months after Mrs. Severance's death. On February 5, 1931, the orchestra performed its inaugural concert at Severance Hall. Also that year, Lillian Baldwin created what became known as the "Cleveland Plan," an initiative designed to build upon the orchestra's earlier children's concerts and create a program that taught classical music to young people before experiencing live performances.

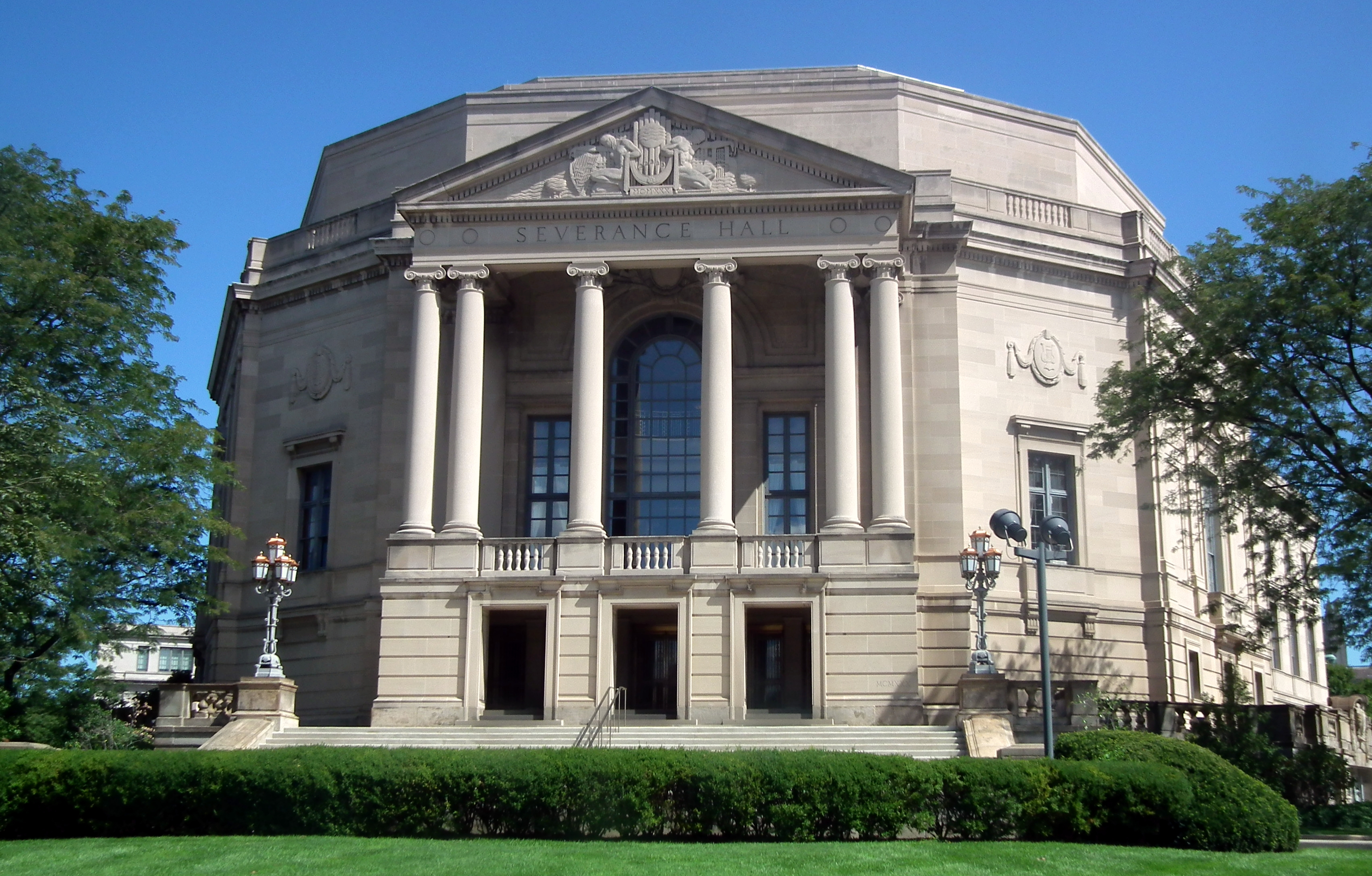
Severance Hall, the orchestra's home since 1931.

In 1933, Sokoloff stood down as the orchestra's music director, succeeded by Artur Rodziński. During his decade-long Cleveland tenure, Rodzinski advocated for the inclusion of staged opera at Severance Hall. The first of these productions was featured during the 1933–34 season, when the orchestra performed Wagner's Tristan und Isolde. In 1935, the orchestra presented the United States' premiere of Dmitri Shostakovich's Lady Macbeth of the Mtsensk District at Severance Hall and, later in the season, took the production to New York's Metropolitan Opera. Four years later, in 1939, the orchestra established the Cleveland Summer Orchestra and began to perform 'pops' concerts at Cleveland's Public Hall. On December 11, 1939, The Cleveland Orchestra celebrated the anniversary of its founding by releasing its first recording on the Columbia label.

Rodzinski departed Cleveland in 1943, succeeded by Erich Leinsdorf. However, Leinsdorf's Cleveland tenure was brief, as he was drafted into the United States Armed Forces shortly after his appointment, which diminished his artistic control. Although Leinsdorf was honorably discharged from the military in September 1944, his time away from the podium had required the Musical Arts Association to employ a number of guest conductors from 1943 until 1945, including George Szell, who had impressed audiences at Severance Hall during two weeks of performances. Leinsdorf lost much of his public support and, though still under contract, submitted his resignation in December 1945.

=== George Szell (1946–1970) ===
In 1946, Szell was appointed as the orchestra's fourth music director. From the start of his tenure, Szell's intention was to transform the orchestra into "America's finest" symphonic ensemble and developing an orchestra that was "second to none." He spent much of his early time in Cleveland changing personnel in an effort to find musicians who were capable of creating his ideal orchestral sound. Szell's stringent standards and expectations for musical precision were reflected in his contract with the Musical Arts Association, which gave him complete artistic control over programming, scheduling, personnel, and recording.

In the 1950s and 1960s, Szell was instrumental in the achievement of several orchestra milestones:

- He led the orchestra on its first European tour, in 1957, across Europe and behind the Iron Curtain.
- Szell pushed to change Severance Hall's acoustic properties, which he considered to be too "dry." Major renovations were made during the 1958–59 season, including the construction of the "Szell Shell", which was designed to project the orchestra's sound in a manner that created better balance among musicians and a clearer string section.

A second European tour took place in 1965, and included a significant tour of the Soviet Union, with performances in Moscow, Kiev, Tbilisi, Yerevan, Sochi, and Leningrad. Two years later, the orchestra became the first American orchestra to be invited to three premiere festivals, in Salzburg, Lucerne, and Edinburgh, in the same summer. Szell also oversaw the opening of the orchestra's summer home, Blossom Music Center, in 1968, which provided the ensemble's musicians with year-round employment. In 1970, after a tenure of 24 years, shortly after a tour of the Far East during the spring of 1970, which included stops in Japan, Korea, and Alaska, Szell died.

Two days after Szell's death, the orchestra played its scheduled program at Blossom Music Center with Aaron Copland taking the podium as guest conductor. Louis Lane, one of Szell's assistant conductors, was appointed resident conductor. Pierre Boulez, who had been named the orchestra's principal guest conductor in 1969, was appointed musical advisor.

=== Lorin Maazel (1972–1982) ===
The board selected Lorin Maazel as the orchestra's fifth music director. His tenure began in 1972. Maazel had first conducted the orchestra at age 13 in 1943, in a concert at Public Hall. During Maazel's tenure, many critics were initially unimpressed with his musical interpretations, which they believed were too emotionally charged to follow Szell's razor-crisp style. But soon Maazel was lifted by an endorsement from Philadelphia Orchestra conductor Eugene Ormandy and the promise of a new collaboration with Decca Records on Prokofiev's Romeo and Juliet, which proved to be the spark Maazel needed to jumpstart his Cleveland Orchestra career. During the 1973–74 season, Maazel led the orchestra on a tour of Australia and New Zealand, joined by guest conductors Stanislaw Skrowaczewski and Erich Leinsdorf. The orchestra also played a series of concerts in Japan. During the following season, the orchestra released its first commercial recording of an opera, George Gershwin's Porgy and Bess, which was also Decca's first opera recording in the United States. Maazel left the orchestra after the 1981–82 season, to take over the directorship of the Vienna State Opera. Before his departure, however, Maazel helped to introduce the orchestra's landmark Martin Luther King Jr. Celebration Concerts in January 1980, which remain an annual tradition to this day. On May 15, 1982, Maazel conducted his final performance at Severance Hall followed by a short tour of New York and New Haven, where he led concerts featuring Giuseppe Verdi's Requiem, which had been his debut piece with the orchestra in 1972.

=== Christoph von Dohnányi (1984–2002) ===
Christoph von Dohnányi first guest-conducted the orchestra in December 1981. In 1982, the orchestra named Dohnányi its music director-designate in 1982. He officially became music director in 1984. During the pair of seasons between Maazel and Dohnányi, various guest conductors conducted the orchestra, including Erich Leinsdorf, who labeled himself the "bridge between the regimes."

Because of Dohnányi's connections with Teldec, Decca/London, and Telarc, his Cleveland Orchestra tenure began with the promise of more recording projects. He also staged a large production of Mozart's The Magic Flute at Blossom Music Center in 1985, which was lauded as "the Ohio musical event of the summer" by The Columbus Dispatch. In addition, Dohnányi oversaw the hiring of Jahja Ling, who would lead the newly established Cleveland Orchestra Youth Orchestra. International touring continued under Dohnányi with visits to Asia and Europe, including the development of a long-standing relationship with the Salzburg Festival beginning in 1990.

To celebrate The Cleveland Orchestra's 75th anniversary, Dohnányi led performances of Wagner's Der Ring des Nibelungen at Severance Hall across the 1992–93 and 1993–94 seasons, and a subsequent recording project of Wagner's Das Rheingold and Die Walküre. The orchestra also began a fundraising campaign for the renovation of Severance Hall, which included the removal of the "Szell Shell," a return of the ensemble's E.M. Skinner organ to the stage, and a facilities expansion designed to enhance the experience of concertgoers. During these renovations, the orchestra performed concerts for its hometown audiences at the Allen Theatre in Cleveland's Playhouse Square. On January 8, 2000, Dohnányi led a gala concert celebrating the re-opening of Severance Hall that was broadcast live on local television by Cleveland's WVIZ.

It was during Dohnányi's tenure that Time magazine called the orchestra the best in the United States.

At the conclusion of Dohnányi's contract, in 2002, he took the title of music director laureate.

=== Franz Welser-Möst (2002–present) ===
Franz Welser-Möst became the orchestra's seventh music director in 2002. Welser-Möst and the Musical Arts Association have extended his contract several times, with his most recent contract keeping him on the podium until 2027, which will make him the orchestra's longest-serving music director. During his tenure, Welser-Möst has overseen many of the orchestra's residencies, outreach programs, and expansion activities. He leads the orchestra's ongoing residencies at the Musikverein in Vienna and at the Lucerne Festival, both of which began with Welser-Möst's first European tour in 2003. In addition, Welser-Möst and the orchestra began an annual residency at Miami's Carnival Center for the Performing Arts (later renamed the Adrienne Arsht Center for the Performing Arts) in 2007. The orchestra has continued to present operas and a selection of film screenings with live musical accompaniment. On September 29, 2018, Welser-Möst led the ensemble in a gala concert at Severance Hall celebrating the orchestra's 100th anniversary, a concert later featured on the American arts television series Great Performances during an exclusive U.S. broadcast on PBS.

In early 2020, the orchestra suspended a planned tour of Europe and Abu Dhabi, and live concerts at Severance Hall and Blossom Music Center due to the COVID-19 pandemic. That October, the orchestra launched the Adella App, a streaming service including historical and newly created content. Access to the service was free to season subscribers and $35 per month for non-subscribers. In 2020, The Cleveland Orchestra announced they had started their own recording label, self-titled as The Cleveland Orchestra. A limited in-person return to concerts was announced for Blossom Music Center for the summer of 2021, with a return to Severance Hall planned for October. In September 2021, the orchestra announced the planned donation of US$50M by the Jack, Joseph and Morton Mandel Foundation, as a result of which Severance Hall was renamed the Jack, Joseph and Morton Mandel Concert Hall, and the overall performance space was renamed Severance Music Center.

In October 2023, Welser-Möst underwent surgery for the removal of a cancerous tumor, and announced curtailment of his performances during the remainder of 2023. In January 2024, the orchestra announced that Welser-Möst is to conclude his tenure as its music director at the close of the 2026–2027 season.

=== Additional history ===
In addition to a vast catalog of recordings created with the ensemble's music directors, the orchestra has made many recordings with guest conductors Vladimir Ashkenazy, Oliver Knussen, Kurt Sanderling, Yoel Levi, Riccardo Chailly, George Benjamin, Roberto Carnevale, Riccardo Muti, Michael Tilson Thomas, and Louis Lane (the orchestra's longtime associate conductor). Past assistant conductors of the Cleveland Orchestra include Matthias Bamert, James Levine, Alan Gilbert, James Judd and Michael Stern.

== Music directors ==
- Nikolai Sokoloff (1918–1933)
- Artur Rodziński (1933–1943)
- Erich Leinsdorf (1943–1946)
- George Szell (1946–1970)
- Lorin Maazel (1972–1982)
- Christoph von Dohnányi (1984–2002)
- Franz Welser-Möst (2002–present)

=== Music directors laureate ===
- Christoph von Dohnányi (2002)

== Daniel R. Lewis Composer Fellows ==
- Marc-André Dalbavie (1999–2000)
- Matthias Pintscher (2001–2003)
- Susan Botti (2003–2005)
- Julian Anderson (2005–2007)
- Johannes Maria Staud (2007–2009)
- Jörg Widmann (2009–2011)
- Sean Shepherd (2011–2013)
- Ryan Wigglesworth (2013–2015)
- Anthony Cheung (2015–2017)
- Bernd Richard Deutsch (2018–2020)
- Allison Loggins-Hull (2021–2025)
- Tyler Taylor (2025–present)

== Honors and awards ==
Grammy Award for Best Orchestral Performance:

- 1970 Boulez: Debussy: Images Pour Orchestre
- 1971 Boulez: Stravinsky: Le Sacre Du Printemps
- 1996 Boulez: Debussy: La Mer (Debussy)
- 1998 Boulez: Berlioz: Symphonie Fantastique; Tristia

Grammy Award for Best Classical Album :

- 1996 Boulez: Debussy: La Mer; Nocturnes; Jeux Etc.

Grammy Award for Best Instrumental Soloist(s) Performance (with orchestra):

- 2011 Uchida: Mozart: Piano Concerto No. 23 (Mozart) & Piano Concerto No. 24 (Mozart)

Grammy Award for Best Engineered Album, Classical:

- 1971 Boulez: Stravinsky: Le Sacre du Printemps

== See also ==
- Cleveland Orchestra discography
- Cleveland Orchestra Youth Orchestra
- Cleveland Philharmonic Orchestra
- Cleveland Women's Orchestra
- Cleveland Chamber Symphony
- CityMusic Cleveland
- Red (an orchestra)
- The Contemporary Youth Orchestra
