= Ronald Perera =

Ronald Christopher Perera (December 25, 1941 - August 4, 2023) was an American composer and professor of music.

== Life and career ==
Born in Boston, Perera attended Groton School; he then studied under Leon Kirchner at Harvard University, earning his BA in 1963 and his MA in 1967. He also had lessons with Randall Thompson, in choral music, and Mario Davidovsky, in electronic music. At the electronic music studio of the University of Utrecht in 1968, he undertook lessons with Gottfried Michael Koenig. His interest in electronic music continued, and in 1975 he collaborated with Jon Appleton to publish The Development and Practice of Electronic Music. From 1968 until 1970 he was on the faculty of Syracuse University, and in the latter year he taught at Dartmouth College. In 1971 he took a position at Smith College, eventually rising to become the Elsie Irwin Sweeney Chair of Music; he retired from the school in 2002. Diagnosed with lung cancer, he died in Yarmouth Port, Massachusetts. In 1967 Perera married Judith Weed, with whom he had three daughters; all four survived him.

During his career Perera received five residencies from the MacDowell Colony, in 1974, 1978, 1981, 1983, and 1988. Beginning in 1972 he received annual ASCAP grants; in 1978 and 1988 he received grants from the National Endowment for the Arts, and in 1997 he gained a permanent fellowship in the Bogliasco Foundation for the Arts and Letters.

Perera's music is diverse in its influences, both musical and otherwise. His 1971 score Alternate Routes for the Dartmouth Dance Company, for instance, investigates sound through the consideration of its physical properties; by contrast, his settings of poetry by Günter Grass, from 1974, combine such diverse quotations as fragments of jazz, march music, and a Strauss waltz. Much of his output is text-oriented, and his sensitivity and responsiveness to his source material has often been noted.

== Selected works ==
Adapted from

=== Stage ===
- Alternate Routes, dance score, electronics (1971)
- The Yellow Wallpaper, opera after Charlotte Perkins Gilman, to a libretto by Constance Congdon (1989)
- S., opera after John Updike, to a libretto by Constance Congdon (1995)
- The Araboolies of Liberty Street, children's opera after Sam Swope, to a libretto by Constance Congdon (2001)

=== Orchestral ===
- Chanteys (1976)
- The White Whale (1981)
- Music for flute and orchestra (1990)

=== Instrumental ===
- Suite for piano (1966)
- Improvisation for Loudspeakers, tape (1969)
- Reverberations, organ and tape (1970)
- Reflex, viola and tape (1975)
- Fantasy Variations, piano and electronics (1976)
- Bright Angels, organ, percussion, and tape (1977)
- Tolling, two pianos and tape (1979)
- Sonatina for viola and piano (1986)
- Sun's Rising, organ (1986)
- Fanfare for viola and piano (1987)
- Out of Shadow, organ (1987)
- Triptych, organ (1997)

=== Choral ===
- Mass, solo voices, chorus, orchestra (1967)
- Did you hear the angels sing?, Soprano, SATB, organ (1968)
- 3 Night Pieces, S, A, SSAA, cello, percussion, piano (1974)
- Everything that has Breath, male/female/mixed two voices, tape (1976)
- The Canticle of the Sun, SATB, narrator (1984)
- The Golden Door, SATB, narrator (1998)

=== Solo vocal ===
- Dove sta amore (Lawrence Ferlinghetti), soprano, tape (1969)
- 5 Summer Songs (Emily Dickinson), soprano, piano (1972)
- Apollo Circling (James Dickey), soprano, piano (1972)
- 3 Poems of Günter Grass, mezzo-soprano, chamber ensemble, tape (1974)
- Children of the Sun (Robert Louis Stevenson), soprano, horn, piano (1979)
- The White Whale (Herman Melville), baritone, orchestra (1981)
