= Louis Lane =

American conductor (1923–2016)

Louis Gardner Lane (December 25, 1923 – February 15, 2016) was an American conductor. Born in Eagle Pass, Texas, Lane studied composition with Kent Kennan at the University of Texas at Austin where he earned his bachelor's in music degree in 1943, and with Bohuslav Martinů at the Tanglewood Music Center (summer 1946), and with Bernard Rogers at the Eastman School of Music (master's degree in music, 1947). He also studied opera with Sarah Caldwell (1950).

He was apprentice conductor to George Szell and the Cleveland Orchestra in 1947. He became assistant conductor there 1955-1960 and associate conductor 1960-1970 and resident conductor 1970-1973. A comment made by George Szell to Lane in 1957 about the eccentric pianist Glenn Gould became quite famous: "That nut's a genius". Gould requested Lane to accompany his subsequent performances in Cleveland, and Lane's Canadian conducting debut was made in 1960 at the Vancouver Festival with Gould.

Lane's programming with the Cleveland Orchestra led to his receiving two major awards, the Mahler Medal in 1971 and the Ditson Conductor's Award in 1972.

He was music director of the Akron Symphony Orchestra 1959-1983 (later becoming their conductor emeritus) and the Lake Erie Opera Theatre 1964-1972. He was principal guest conductor of the Dallas Symphony Orchestra and held other positions with that group 1973-1978. He is given credit for developing that orchestra into a full-time group with a 52-week contract.

He was co-conductor of the Atlanta Symphony Orchestra 1977-1983. He was also principal guest conductor 1982-1983 and principal conductor 1984-1985 of the National Symphony Orchestra of the South African Broadcasting Corporation based in Johannesburg.

He was adjunct professor at the University of Akron 1969-1983 and a visiting professor at the University of Cincinnati 1973-1975. Lane served as artistic adviser and conductor at the Cleveland Institute of Music for over 20 years from 1982 through 2004 after which he served as faculty emeritus. He received an honorary doctorate from the same institution in 1995.

He was also director of orchestra studies at Oberlin College 1995-1998 and at The University of Texas at Austin 1989-1992. He made his first recording for Epic Records (subsidiary of Columbia Records) in 1958 and between Epic and Columbia made fourteen recordings, all of which have been issued in a box set from Sony that came out in July 2024.

== Awards ==
- Mahler Medal, 1971
- Ditson Conductor's Award, 1972
- Chevalier de l'Ordre des Arts et des Lettres of France, 1979.
- Grammy Award 1989

== Bibliography ==
- Baker's Biographical Dictionary of Musicians. 2001. OCLC 607142582.
- Bazanna, Kevin (2005). Wondrous Stage: The Life and Art of Glenn Gould. Oxford University Press. pp. 158–159. ISBN 978-0195182460.
- "Celebrated musicians' concert tours of Southern Africa 1953 -1978: Louis Lane, American Conductor". Classicalmusicianstoza.blogspot.ca. June 21, 2014.
- Texas Birth Index, 1903–1997
