= Oiseaux exotiques =

Composition by Olivier Messiaen

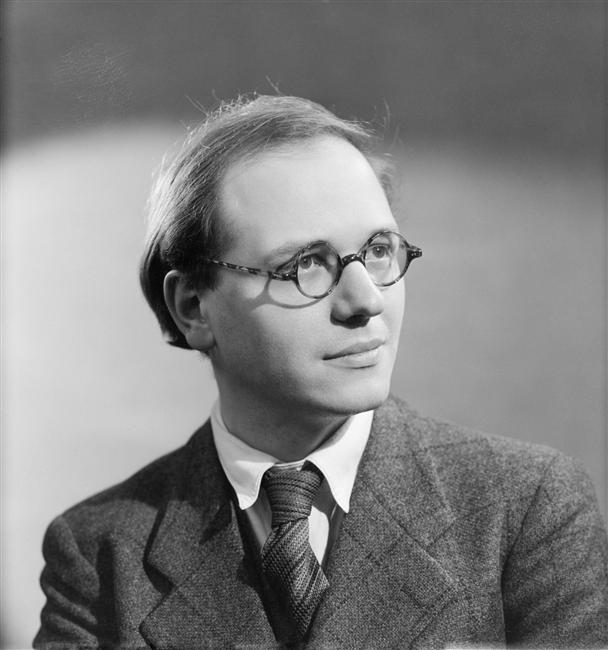
Olivier Messiaen in 1937

Oiseaux exotiques (Exotic birds) is a piece for piano and small orchestra by Olivier Messiaen. It was written between 5 October 1953 and 3 January 1956 and was commissioned by Pierre Boulez. It is dedicated to the pianist Yvonne Loriod, who later became the composer's wife.

== Premiere ==
This piece was first performed at the Théâtre du Petit Marigny by Yvonne Loriod and the ensemble Domaine musical, conducted by Rudolf Alberth.

== Orchestral setting ==
Piano, piccolo, 2 flutes, oboe, 2 B♭ clarinets, clarinet in E♭, bass clarinet, bassoon, 2 horns, trumpet, and 6 percussionists playing glockenspiel, xylophone, chimes, cowbell, three gongs, snare drum, tam-tam, temple blocks, and wood block.

== The work ==
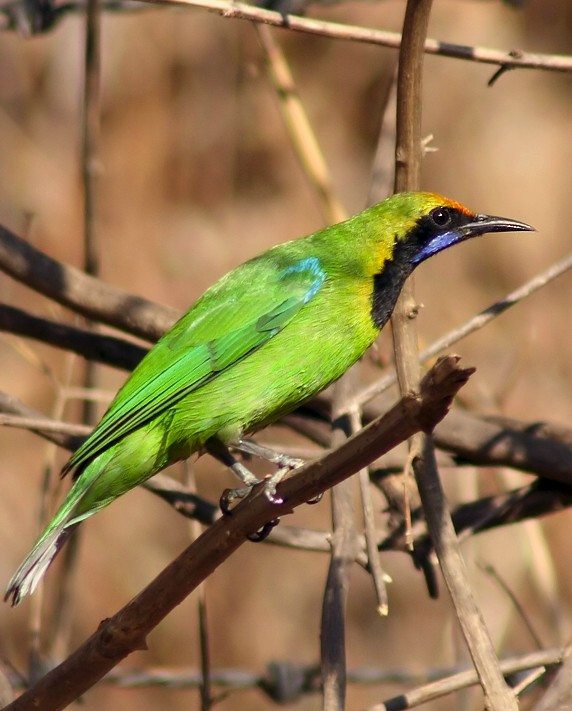
Golden-fronted leafbird (Chloropsis aurifrons)

The birdsongs in this piece are from Asia and the Americas: the southern hill myna, the golden-fronted leafbird, the Baltimore oriole, the greater prairie chicken, the northern mockingbird, the catbird, the Indian robin, the white-crested laughingthrush, the american robin (played by the two clarinets), the Swainson's thrush, the hermit thrush, the red-whiskered bulbul and the wood thrush.

=== Hindu rhythms ===
Decî-Tâlas of ancient India, Cârngadeva system: Nihcankalîla, Gajalîla, Laksmîca, Caccarî, Candrakâla, Dhenkî, Gajajhampa, and karnâtic theory: Matsya-Sankirna, Triputa-Miśra, Matsya-Tiśra, Atatâla-Cundh.

=== Greek rhythms ===
Composed feet by the metre: Typistlo-Epitrite; verses by the metre: lambelegiac, logaedic verses: Asclepiad, Saphique, Glyconic, Aristophanian, Phalaean, Peregrinean.

== Duration ==
The piece lasts about 16 minutes.

== Recording ==
Michael Thompson (French horn), London Sinfonietta (Orchestra), Paul Crossley (piano) (+ Des Canyons aux étoiles..., Couleurs de la Cité céleste) CBS Records, 1989, Angelin Chang (piano) and Cleveland Chamber Symphony) New European Recordings, won the 2007 GRAMMY for Best Instrumental Soloist(s) Performance (with orchestra).
