= IWC Super Indy Championship =

Professional wrestling championship

Details
- Promotion: International Wrestling Cartel
- Date established: March 22, 2002
- Current champions: Ganon Jones, Jr.
- Date won: December 2, 2023
Statistics
- First champion: Super Hentai
- Longest reign: Super Hentai (357 days)
- Shortest reign: Jason Gory, Jonathan Gresham, David Starr, Sam Adonis, Ganon Jones, Jr. (<1 day)
- Heaviest champion: Sam Adonis (255 lb (116 kg))
- Lightest champion: John McChesney, Shiima Xion (169 lb (77 kg))

The IWC Super Indy Championship is a professional wrestling championship in the wrestling promotion International Wrestling Cartel. The championship was first awarded on March 22, 2002, when Super Hentai defeated Christopher Daniels in the finals of the first Super Indy tournament.

There have been 58 reigns among 33 wrestlers with 18 vacancies. Most of the vacancies came due to the Super Indy Tournament. The inaugural champion was Super Hentai. John McChesney has the most reigns at seven. Super Hentai has the longest singular reign at 357 days. He accomplished this in two separate reigns. Jason Gory, Jonathan Gresham, David Starr, Sam Adonis, and Ganon Jones, Jr. have the shortest reigns at less than one day. Super Hentai has the longest combined reign at 826 days.

Ganon Jones, Jr. is the current champion. He defeated Anthony Catena at the 6th Annual IWC Pittsburgh Classic on December 2, 2023.

== Title history ==
As of 5 December 2023

=== Names ===
Name	Time of use
IWC Super Indy Championship	March 22, 2002 – present

=== Reigns ===
Key
No.	Overall reign number
Reign	Reign number for the specific champion
Days	Number of days held
<1	Reign lasted less than a day
+	Current reign is changing daily

No.	Champion	Championship change			Reign statistics		Notes	Ref.
No.	Champion	Date	Event	Location	Reign	Days	Notes	Ref.
1	Super Hentai	March 22, 2002	Super Indy	Monroeville, Pennsylvania	1	357	Defeated Christopher Daniels in the finals of the Super Indy tournament to become the first champion.	
2	AJ Styles	March 14, 2003	House show	Penn Hills, Pennsylvania	1	57		
—	Vacated	May 10, 2003	—	–	—	—		
3	Colt Cabana	May 10, 2003	Super Indy II	Penn Hills, Pennsylvania	1	315	Defeated Matt Stryker in the finals of the Super Indy tournament.	
4	AJ Styles	March 20, 2004	Super Indy Showdown	White Oak, Pennsylvania	2	49	Defeated Cabana in the finals of the Super Indy Survivor Showdown tournament.	
—	Vacated	May 8, 2004	Super Indy III	West Mifflin, Pennsylvania	—	—	Styles relinquished title after a successful final defense against Christopher Daniels.	
5	Chris Sabin	May 8, 2004	Super Indy III	West Mifflin, Pennsylvania	1	211	Defeated Alex Shelley in the finals of the Super Indy tournament.	
—	Vacated	December 5, 2004	–	–	—	—	Sabin relinquished title due to sustaining an injury.	
6	Sterling James Keenan	December 11, 2004	Call to Arms 2	Wilmerding, Pennsylvania	1	139	This was a four-way match also involving Alex Shelley, Josh Prohibition, and John McChesney.	
—	Vacated	April 29, 2005	Super Indy IV	McKeesport, Pennsylvania	—	—	Kennan relinquished title for the purposes of the Super Indy tournament.	
7	John McChesney	April 29, 2005	Super Indy IV	Wilmerding, Pennsylvania	1	113	Defeated Low Ki in the finals of the Super Indy tournament.	
8	Sterling James Keenan	August 20, 2005	ROH Do or Die V	Philadelphia, Pennsylvania	2	6		
9	John McChesney	August 26, 2005	Summer Sizzler 2	Philadelphia, Pennsylvania	2	204		
10	Low Ki	March 18, 2006	The Road to Super Indy V	Philadelphia, Pennsylvania	1	28		
—	Vacated	April 15, 2006	Super Indy V	Elizabeth, Pennsylvania	—	—	Low Ki relinquished title for the purposes of the Super Indy tournament.	
11	Delirious	April 15, 2006	Super Indy V	Elizabeth, Pennsylvania	1	210	Defeated Troy Lords in the finals of the Super Indy tournament.	
12	John McChesney	November 11, 2006	November Pain	Elizabeth, Pennsylvania	3	69	Daizee Haze was banned from ringside.	
13	Troy Lords	January 19, 2007	A New Beginning Too	Elizabeth, Pennsylvania	1	112		
14	Jason Gory	May 11, 2007	Super Indy VI	McKeesport, Pennsylvania	1	<1	It was a Four corners elimination match that also included Eric Young and John McChesney.	
—	Vacated	May 11, 2007	Super Indy VI	McKeesport, Pennsylvania	—	—	Gory relinquished title for the purposes of the Super Indy tournament finals.	
15	Larry Sweeney	May 11, 2007	Super Indy VI	McKeesport, Pennsylvania	1	57		
16	John McChesney	July 7, 2007	Summer Sizzler 4: Checkmate	Elizabeth, Pennsylvania	4	196		
17	Larry Sweeney	January 19, 2008	A New Beginning 2008	Elizabeth, Pennsylvania	2	119	This was a Texarkana deathmatch.	
18	Jerry Lynn	May 17, 2008	Hell Hath No Fury 3	Elizabeth, Pennsylvania	1	119	Lynn won the Super Indy VII tournament, but refused the title. He wanted to prove he could pin then-champion Larry Sweeney.	
19	Johnny Gargano	September 13, 2008	Boiling Point 3	Elizabeth, Pennsylvania	1	42	This was a three-way elimination match which also included Super Hentai	
—	Vacated	October 25, 2008	—	Cheswick, Pennsylvania	—	—	Gargano relinquished title due to sustaining an injury.	
20	Delirious	October 26, 2008	Promotional Consideration Paid for by the Following...: Night 2	Cheswick, Pennsylvania	1	201		
—	Vacated	May 15, 2009	Super Indy VIII: Night 1	Elizabeth, Pennsylvania	—	—	Delirious relinquished the title for the purposes of the Super Indy tournament. Event took place at Steel City Con.	
21	Super Hentai	May 16, 2009	Super Indy VIII: Night 2	Elizabeth, Pennsylvania	2	357		
—	Vacated	May 8, 2010	Super Indy IX	Elizabeth, Pennsylvania	—	—	Super Hentai relinquished the title for the purposes of the Super Indy tournament.	
22	Shiima Xion	May 8, 2010	Super Indy IX	Elizabeth, Pennsylvania	1	266	This was a three-way elimination match also involving Azrieal and Johnny Gargano in the finals of the Super Indy tournament.	
23	Super Hentai	January 29, 2011	A.D. After DeMarco	Elizabeth, Pennsylvania	3	49		
24	Matthew Justice	March 19, 2011	Combat in Clearfield	Clearfield, Pennsylvania	1	28		
25	Super Hentai	April 16, 2011	Night of Legends	Franklin, Pennsylvania	4	63		
—	Vacated	June 18, 2011	Super Indy X	Elizabeth, Pennsylvania	—	—	Super Hentai relinquished the title for the purposes of the Super Indy tournament.	
26	Egotistico Fantastico	June 18, 2011	Super Indy X	Elizabeth, Pennsylvania	1	41	This was a three-way elimination match which also in the finals of the Super Indy tournament. It involved El Generico and Super Hentai.	
—	Vacated	July 29, 2011	–	–	—	—	Vacated for undocumented reasons.	
27	Michael Facade	June 18, 2011	Winner Takes All	Elizabeth, Pennsylvania	1	255	This was a ladder match in the finals of the Super Indy tournament. It involved Hallowicked, Logan Shulo, and Matt Cross.	
28	Sami Callihan	June 23, 2012	Super Indy XI	Elizabeth, Pennsylvania	1	119	Defeated previous champion in the finals of the Super Indy tournament.	
29	Facade	October 20, 2012	Super Indy XI	Elizabeth, Pennsylvania	1	56	This was a three-way match also involving Rich Swann.	
30	Logan Shulo	December 15, 2012	Winner Takes All	Elizabeth, Pennsylvania	1	42	This was a title vs. title match where the IWC World Heavyweight Championship was also on-the-line.	
31	Anthony Nese	January 26, 2013	Payback	Elizabeth, Pennsylvania	1	140	Defeated previous champion in the finals of the Super Indy tournament.	
32	Facade	June 15, 2013	Super Indy XII	Elizabeth, Pennsylvania	3	126	This was a three-way elimination match in the finals of the Super Indy tournament also involving Gory.	
33	Shiima Xion	October 19, 2013	Retro Reunion	Elizabeth, Pennsylvania	2	56		
34	RJ City	December 14, 2013	Winner Takes All	Elizabeth, Pennsylvania	1	308		
35	Andrew Palace	October 18, 2014	Retro Reunion 200: IWC's 200th Show	Elizabeth, Pennsylvania	1	238		
—	Vacated	June 13, 2015	Super Indy XIV	Elizabeth, Pennsylvania	—	—	Palace relinquished the title for the purposes of the Super Indy tournament.	
36	Dylan Bostic	June 13, 2015	Super Indy XIV	Elizabeth, Pennsylvania	1	182	This was a three-way match in the finals of the Super Indy tournament also involving Raymond Rowe and Alex Daniels.	
37	Andrew Palace	December 12, 2015	Winner Takes All	Elizabeth, Pennsylvania	2	182	This was a hair vs. title match.	
—	Vacated	June 11, 2016	Super Indy 15	Elizabeth, Pennsylvania	—	—	Palace relinquished the title for the purposes of the Super Indy tournament.	
38	Josh Alexander	June 11, 2016	Super Indy 15	Elizabeth, Pennsylvania	1	122		
—	Vacated	October 11, 2016	–	Elizabeth, Pennsylvania	—	—	Alexander relinquished the title due to being unable to defend it.	
39	Chris LeRusso	October 15, 2016	IWC/HOH XX	Elizabeth, Pennsylvania	1	175	Defeated Facade to win the vacant title.	
40	John McCheseny	October 15, 2016	A Night of Superstars 6	Meadville, Pennsylvania	5	35	Ricky Steamboat was the special referee.	
41	Chris LeRusso	May 13, 2017	Aftershock Vol. 2: The Road to Super Indy	Elizabeth, Pennsylvania	2	28	This was a Two out of Three falls match.	
42	Jonathan Gresham	June 10, 2017	Super Indy 16	Elizabeth, Pennsylvania	1	<1	This was a Super Indy semi-final match.	
43	Adam Cole	June 10, 2017	Super Indy 16	Elizabeth, Pennsylvania	1	42	Cole won the title in the finals of Super Indy tournament.	
44	John McChesney	July 22, 2017	Threat Level Midnight	Elizabeth, Pennsylvania	6	28		
—	Vacated	August 19, 2017	–	Elizabeth, Pennsylvania	—	—	McChesney relinquished the title due to sustaining a shoulder injury.	
45	Gory	August 19, 2017	Caged Fury	Elizabeth, Pennsylvania	2	294	This was a four-way match also involving Anthony Henry, Joey Janela, and Suge D.	
46	David Starr	June 9, 2018	Super Indy 17	Elizabeth, Pennsylvania	1	<1	This was a Super Indy semi-final match.	
47	Jonathan Gresham	June 9, 2018	Super Indy 17	Elizabeth, Pennsylvania	2	224	This was the finals of the Super Indy tournament.	
48	John McChesney	January 19, 2019	Reloaded 5.0	Elizabeth, Pennsylvania	7	56		
49	Wardlow	March 16, 2019	Eighteen	Elizabeth, Pennsylvania	1	147		
50	Josh Alexander	August 10, 2019	Caged Fury	Elizabeth, Pennsylvania	2	56	This was a steel cage match.	
51	Johnny Patch	October 5, 2019	Unbreakable	Elizabeth, Pennsylvania	1	343		
52	Sam Adonis	September 12, 2020	Super Indy 19	Washington, Pennsylvania	1	<1		
53	Brian Pillman Jr.	September 12, 2020	Super Indy 19	Washington, Pennsylvania	1	161		
54	Bill Collier	February 20, 2021	Kickoff	Elizabeth, Pennsylvania	1	147		
55	Matthew Justice	July 17, 2021	Fight Night	Elizabeth, Pennsylvania	1	29	This was a No Disqualification match.	
56	Bill Collier	August 15, 2021	Caged Fury	Elizabeth, Pennsylvania	2	62	This was a steel cage match.	
—	Vacated	October 16, 2021	Super Indy 20	Elizabeth, Pennsylvania	—	—	Collier relinquished the title for the purposes of the Super Indy tournament.	
57	Cole Karter	October 16, 2021	Super Indy 20	Elizabeth, Pennsylvania	1	98	Defeated Anthony Greene in the finals of the Super Indy tournament.	
—	Vacated	January 22, 2022	Reloaded 8.0	Elizabeth, Pennsylvania	—	—	Karter relinquished the title due to signing with WWE.	
58	Derek Dillinger	January 22, 2022	Reloaded 8.0	Elizabeth, Pennsylvania	1	259	This was a four-way match involving Jaxon Argos, Anthony Young, and Andrew Palace.	
59	Cole Karter	October 8, 2022	Super Indy 21	Elizabeth, Pennsylvania	2	238	Defeated Derek Dilinger in the finals of the Super Indy tournament..	
60	Jock Samson	June 3, 2023	PlummerSlam	Elizabeth, Pennsylvania	1	35		
—	Vacated	July 8, 2023	Threat Level Midnight V	Elizabeth, Pennsylvania	—	—	Jock Samson relinquished the title for the purpose to face Justin Plummer at Caged Fury 2023.	
61	Duke Davis	October 7, 2023	Super Indy 22	Elizabeth, Pennsylvania	1	28	Defeated Anthony Catena in the finals of the Super Indy tournament..	
62	Ganon Jones, Jr.	November 4, 2023	Winner Takes All	Elizabeth, Pennsylvania	1	<1		
63	Anthony Catena	November 4, 2023	Winner Takes All	Elizabeth, Pennsylvania	1	28	Following the Ganon Jones, Jr. and Duke Davis match, Justin Plummer called an impromptu title match for Anthony Catena.	
64	Ganon Jones, Jr.	December 2, 2023	6th Annual Pittsburgh Classic	Elizabeth, Pennsylvania	2	980+	This was a Lumberjack Match.	
