= IWC Heavyweight Championship =

Professional wrestling championship

IWC World Heavyweight Championship

Details
- Promotion: International Wrestling Cartel
- Date established: March 17, 2001
- Current champion: Jami Jameson
- Date won: December 6, 2025

Other name
- IWC Heavyweight Championship
Statistics
- First champion: Powerhouse Hughes
- Most reigns: Dennis Gregory (5 reigns)
- Longest reign: Shirley Doe (545 days)
- Shortest reign: Dennis Gregory, RJ City, and Bill Collier (<1 day)
- Heaviest champion: Balls Mahoney (304 lb (138 kg))
- Lightest champion: John McChesney (169 lb (77 kg))

The IWC World Heavyweight Championship is a professional wrestling heavyweight championship in the wrestling promotion, International Wrestling Cartel. The championship was first awarded March 17, 2001 when Powerhouse Hughes defeated Bubba the Bulldog, Guido Corleone, Homicyde, Orion, and Paul Atlas in a six-way elimination match last eliminating Orion. During Hughes' reign, the title was defended on Championship Wrestling Federation shows as Hughes was the owner of the promotion.

As of March 9, 2022, there are 44 reigns among 28 wrestlers with five vacancies. The inaugural champion was Powerhouse Hughes. Dennis Gregory has the most reigns at five. Shirley Doe has the longest singular reign at 545 days. Dennis Gregory, RJ City, and DJZ have the shortest singular reign at less than one day. John McChesney has the longest combined reign at 805 days.

Jami Jameson is the current champion in his first reign. He defeated Duke Davis at the 8th Annual Pittsburgh Classic on December 6, 2025.

== Title history ==
As of March 17, 2026.

=== Names ===
Name	Time of use
IWC World Heavyweight Championship	March 17, 2001 – present

=== Reigns ===
Key
No.	Overall reign number
Reign	Reign number for the specific champion
Days	Number of days held
N/A	Unknown information
<1	Reign lasted less than a day
+	Current reign is changing daily

No.	Champion	Championship change			Reign statistics		Notes	Ref.
No.	Champion	Date	Event	Location	Reign	Days	Notes	Ref.
1	Powerhouse Hughes	March 17, 2001	House show	McKees Rocks, Pennsylvania	1	(Note: The exact length of Hughes reign is unknown. It may have lasted between 83 and 560 days.)	Hughes defeated Bubba the Bulldog, Guido Corleone, Homicyde, Orion, and Paul Atlas in a six-way elimination match. He last eliminated Orion to become the inaugural champion. During his reign, the title was defended on Championship Wrestling Federation shows as Hughes was the owner of the promotion.	
—	Vacated	N/A	—	–	—	—	Hughes relinquished the title due to sustaining an injury.	
2	Orion	September 29, 2001	House show	McKees Rocks, Pennsylvania	1	154		
3	Jimmy Vegas	March 2, 2002	House show	West Mifflin, Pennsylvania	1	42		
4	CM Punk	April 13, 2002	House show	Monroeville, Pennsylvania	1	(Note: The exact length of CM Punk's reign is unknown. It may have lasted between 12 and 97 days.)		
—	Vacated	N/A	—	–	—	—	CM Punk relinquished the title due to sustaining an injury.	
5	Colt Cabana	July 7, 2002	House show	Canonsburg, Pennsylvania	1	152	Defeated Shirley Doe in the finals of a tournament to win the vacant title.	
6	Dennis Gregory	December 6, 2002	House show	Canonsburg, Pennsylvania	1	<1		
7	Jimmy Vegas	December 6, 2002	House show	Canonsburg, Pennsylvania	2	204		
8	Dennis Gregory	June 28, 2003	Big Butler Fair 2003	Prospect, Pennsylvania	2	136		
9	Sterling James Keenan	November 1, 2003	November Pain	West Mifflin, Pennsylvania	1	140		
10	Dean Radford	March 20, 2004	Super Indy Showdown	West Mifflin, Pennsylvania	1	49		
11	Eric Xctasy	May 8, 2004	Super Indy III	West Mifflin, Pennsylvania	1	140		
12	Shirley Doe	September 25, 2004	Boiling Point	Monroeville, Pennsylvania	1	49	This was a no disqualification match. Special referees were Mick Foley and Chris Wood.	
13	Balls Mahoney	November 13, 2004	Accept No Limitations	Wilmerding, Pennsylvania	1	28		
14	Shirley Doe	December 11, 2004	A Call to Arms 2	Wilmerding, Pennsylvania	2	545	This was a street fight.	
15	Dennis Gregory	June 9, 2006	Summer Sizzler III	Elizabeth, Pennsylvania	3	71		
—	Vacated	August 19, 2006	—	–	—	—	Gregory was stripped of the title due to using a sword during a WarGames match.	
16	Ricky Reyes	September 16, 2006	Boiling Point 2	Elizabeth, Pennsylvania	1	237	Defeated Low Ki in the finals of a tournament.	
17	Dennis Gregory	May 11, 2007	Super Indy VI	McKeesport, Pennsylvania	4	93	This was a three-way match which included Brent Albright.	
18	The Sandman	December 8, 2007	A Call to Arms 4: Controlled Chaos	Elizabeth, Pennsylvania	1	139	This was a steel cage match.	
19	Dennis Gregory	April 25, 2008	Super Indy VII	Elizabeth, Pennsylvania	5	119		
—	Vacated	August 22, 2008	—	–	—	—	Gregory was stripped of the title due to assaulting IWC officials and personnel.	
20	Shiima Xion	October 26, 2008	Promotional Consideration Paid for by the Following...: Night 2	Cheswick, Pennsylvania	1	90	Xion defeated Jimmy DeMarco in the finals of a tournament at Steel City Con.	
21	Raymond Rowe	January 24, 2009	A New Beginning Wooooo!	Elizabeth, Pennsylvania	1	42		
22	Shiima Xion	March 7, 2009	Accept No Limitations 5	Elizabeth, Pennsylvania	2	280		
23	Jimmy DeMarco	December 12, 2009	A Call to Arms 2009: Full Circle	Elizabeth, Pennsylvania	1	343		
24	John McChesney	November 20, 2010	Winner Takes All	Elizabeth, Pennsylvania	1	385	This was a title vs. career match last man standing match.	
25	Jimmy DeMarco	December 10, 2011	Winner Takes All	Elizabeth, Pennsylvania	2	91	This was a three-way match which included Shiima Xion.	
26	Logan Shulo	March 10, 2012	The Road to Super Indy XI	Elizabeth, Pennsylvania	1	280		
27	John McChesney	December 15, 2012	Winner Takes All	Elizabeth, Pennsylvania	2	364	The special referee was Jimmy DeMarco.	
28	Dalton Castle	December 14, 2013	Winner Takes All	Elizabeth, Pennsylvania	1	406	The special referee was Norm Connors.	
29	RJ City	January 24, 2015	Reloaded	Elizabeth, Pennsylvania	1	<1		
30	Tommy Dreamer	January 24, 2015	Reloaded	Elizabeth, Pennsylvania	1	210		
31	Rhino	August 22, 2015	Caged Fury	Elizabeth, Pennsylvania	1	56	This was a steel cage match.	
32	John McChesney	October 17, 2015	Unbreakable	Elizabeth, Pennsylvania	3	56	This was a three-way match that included Jimmy Nutts.	
33	Jimmy Nutts	December 12, 2015	Winner Takes All	Elizabeth, Pennsylvania	1	91	This was a ladder match.	
34	DJZ	March 12, 2016	Fifteen	Elizabeth, Pennsylvania	3	273		
—	Vacated	December 10, 2016	Winner Takes All	Elizabeth, Pennsylvania	—	—	DJZ relinquished the title due to sustaining an injury.	
35	Wardlow	December 10, 2016	Winner Takes All	Elizabeth, Pennsylvania	1	364	Wardlow defeated RJ City to win the vacant title.	
36	Andrew Palace	December 9, 2017	Winner Takes All	Elizabeth, Pennsylvania	1	98		
37	Wardlow	March 17, 2018	Seventeen	Elizabeth, Pennsylvania	2	147		
38	Jack Pollock	August 11, 2018	Caged Fury	Elizabeth, Pennsylvania	1	119		
39	Wardlow	December 8, 2018	Pittsburgh Classic	Elizabeth, Pennsylvania	3	189	This was a two out of three falls match.	
40	Jaxon Argos	June 15, 2019	Super Indy 18	Elizabeth, Pennsylvania	1	175	Argos activated the reset button following the Super Indy tournament.	
41	Jack Pollock	December 7, 2019	2nd Annual Pittsburgh Classic	Elizabeth, Pennsylvania	2	98	This was a no count-out and no disqualification match.	
42	Jimmy Vegas	March 14, 2020	Nineteen	Elizabeth, Pennsylvania	3	182	This was a title vs. career match	
43	Jock Samson	September 12, 2020	Super Indy 19	Washington, Pennsylvania	1	85	This was a three-way match which also included Jack Pollock.	
44	Andrew Palace	December 5, 2020	3rd Annual Pittsburgh Classic	Elizabeth, Pennsylvania	2	274	This was a three-way match which also included Bill Collier.	
45	Bulk Nasty	September 5, 2021	Unbreakable	Elizabeth, Pennsylvania	1	286	This was a three-way match which also included Spencer Slade.	
46	Bill Collier	June 18, 2022	Aftershock	Elizabeth, Pennsylvania	1	<1		
47	Elijah Dean	June 18, 2022	Aftershock	Elizabeth, Pennsylvania	1	168	Lebanon Don and Tito Oric attacked Collier after the match. This allowed Dean to activate the Reset Button and pin Collier to win the title.	
48	Bill Collier	December 3, 2022	5th Annual Pittsburgh Classic	Elizabeth, Pennsylvania	2	931		
49	Duke Davis	June 21, 2025	The Last Stand	Elizabeth, Pennsylvania	1	168	Steel Cage Match	
50	Jami Jameson	December 6, 2025	The 8th Annual Pittsburgh Classic	Elizabeth, Pennsylvania	1	101+		

== Reigns by combined length ==
As of March 17, 2026.

Key

†	Indicates the current champion
<1	Indicates reign lasted less than one day
+	Indicates the combined reign is changing daily
¤	The exact length of at least one title reign is uncertain, so the shortest possible length is used.

Rank	Wrestler	No. of reigns	Combined days
1	John McChesney	3	805
2	Bill Collier	2	931
3	Wardlow	3	700
4	Shirley Doe	2	594
5	Dennis Gregory	5	563
6	Jimmy DeMarco	2	434
7	Jimmy Vegas	3	428
8	Dalton Castle	1	406
9	Andrew Palace	2	372
10	Shiima Zion/DJZ	3	370
11	Bulk Nasty	1	286
12	Logan Shulo	1	280
13	Ricky Reyes	1	237
14	Jack Pollock	2	217
15	Tommy Dreamer	1	210
16	Jaxon Argos	1	175
17	Elijah Dean	1	168
18	Orion	1	154
19	Colt Cabana	1	152
20	The Sandman	1	139
21	Sterling James Keenan	1	140
21	Eric Xctasy	1	140
23	Jimmy Nutts	1	91
24	Jock Samson	1	85
25	Powerhouse Hughes	1	83¤
26	Rhino	1	56
27	Dean Radford	1	49
28	Raymond Rowe	1	42
29	CM Punk	1	12¤
30	Jami Jameson+	1	101+
31	RJ City	1	<1
