= Cole Karter =

American professional wrestler (born 2000)

- Karter in 2025

Personal information
- Born: Cole McKinney; May 30, 2000 (age 26) Charleston, West Virginia

Professional wrestling career
- Ring name(s): Cole Karter; Troy Donovan; Troy "Two Dimes" Donovan
- Billed height: 6 ft 2 in (1.88 m)
- Billed weight: 238 lb (108 kg)
- Debut: August 8, 2020

Cole McKinney (born May 30, 2000) is an American professional wrestler. He is best known for his time in All Elite Wrestling (AEW) and Ring of Honor (ROH), where he performed under the ring name Cole Karter. He is also known for his time in WWE, where he performed under the ring name Troy "Two Dimes" Donovan.

== Professional wrestling career ==
=== Independent circuit (2020–present) ===
McKinney, under the ring name Cole Karter, made his professional wrestling debut on August 8, 2020, at an event held by International Wrestling Cartel (IWC). On October 16, 2021, Karter defeated Anthony Greene in the finals of the Super Indy 20 to win the IWC Super Indy Championship. Three months later on January 22, 2022, Karter vacated the title after signing with WWE.

=== WWE (2022) ===
On March 17, 2022, McKinney was announced among a class of recruits who reported to the WWE Performance Center to begin training with WWE. On the April 8, 2022 episode of NXT Level Up, he made his debut under the ring name Troy Donovan, teaming with Channing Lauren in a losing effort to Andre Chase and Bodhi Hayward. On the April 26 episode of NXT, Donovan and Lauren were introduced as the henchmen of Tony D'Angelo, under the modified ring names of Troy "Two Dimes" Donovan and Channing "Stacks" Lorenzo, forming a stable known as The D'Angelo Family. On the May 24 episode of NXT, Donovan and Lorenzo earned their first win as a team when they defeated Edris Enofé and Malik Blade. At NXT In Your House, The D'Angelo Family defeated Legado Del Fantasma in a match where the losing team had to join the winning team's stable, thus forcing Legado Del Fantasma to join The Family.

On June 11, Donovan was released from his WWE contract due to a policy issue. His last appearance was on the June 14 episode of NXT (taped on June 8) where he teamed with Lorenzo in a losing effort to Carmelo Hayes and Trick Williams. On the June 28 episode of NXT, to explain his departure, D'Angelo and Lorenzo were shown standing near a bridge and looking down at the river with D'Angelo claiming that he had taken care of a traitor within his group (referring to Donovan) by "making him sleep with the fishes".

=== All Elite Wrestling / Ring of Honor (2022–2026) ===
In 2021, Karter made several appearances for All Elite Wrestling (AEW) on Dark and Dark: Elevation, with his most notable appearance being on the April 14, 2021, episode of Dynamite, losing to Anthony Ogogo.

Shortly after his release from WWE, McKinney, under his previous ring name Cole Karter, appeared on the July 16, 2022 episode of Dark (aired July 26), defeating Mike Orlando. At Dynamite: Fyter Fest on July 20, Karter challenged Ricky Starks for the FTW Championship in a losing effort. Following this, it was announced that Karter had signed with the company. On the August 1 episode of Dark: Elevation, Karter joined The Factory alongside QT Marshall, Aaron Solo, Anthony Ogogo, and Nick Comoroto. On the November 2 episode of Dynamite, Karter (disguised as Sting) cost Darby Allin his match against Jay Lethal, which was revealed to be a deal made between Lethal and The Factory. During Full Gear's pre-show Zero Hour, Karter teamed with Marshall, Solo, Comoroto, and Lee Johnson, losing to Best Friends (Chuck Taylor and Trent Beretta), Orange Cassidy, Rocky Romero, and Danhausen.

Heading into 2023, The Factory quietly disbanded as Karter began appearing more frequently in AEW's sister promotion Ring of Honor (ROH). Karter would begin a winning streak on ROH on Honor Club, which gained the attention of Maria Kanellis, who offered him her managerial services which Karter accepted. Soon after, Karter and Maria recruited Griff Garrison to join them as Karter and Garrison began teaming up. On the September 28 episode of Honor Club, Karter and Garrison, now managed by Maria, won their first match as a team wherr they defeated Shawn Dean and Carlie Bravo of The Infantry.

In February 2025, Karter and Garrison formed a stable, the "Frat House", with Preston Vance and Jacked Jameson. In November 2026, it was reported by Fightful Select that Karter was released from his AEW contract after reportedly providing false information to excuse himself from a ROH taping.

== Championships and accomplishments ==
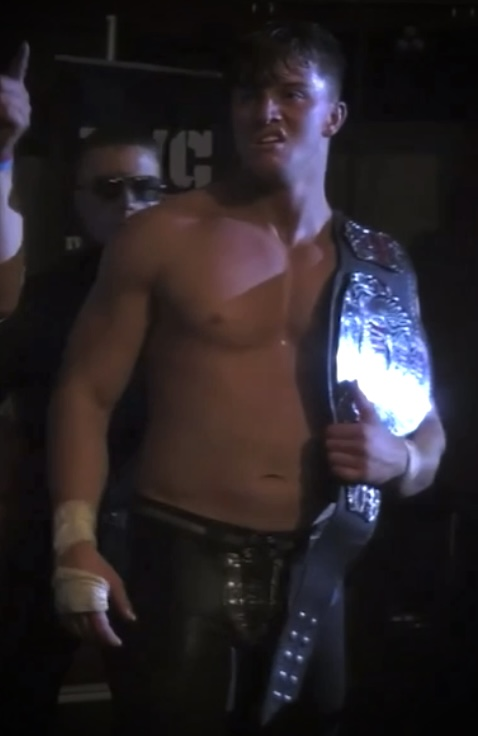
Karter is a former one-time IWC Super Indy Champion.

- International Wrestling Cartel
  - IWC Super Indy Championship (2 times)
  - IWC Super Indy Tournament (2021, 2022)
- LDN Wrestling
  - LDN World Championship (1 time)
  - Maximum Air Tournament (2021)
- Pro Wrestling Conquest
  - Pro Wrestling Conquest Imperial Championship (1 time)
- Other championships
  - Bull of the Woods Championship (1 time)
