= IWC Women's Championship =

Professional wrestling championship

Details
- Promotion: International Wrestling Cartel
- Date established: December 10, 2016
- Current champion(s): Milla Moore
- Date won: November 2, 2024
Statistics
- First champion(s): Britt Baker
- Most reigns: Katie Arquette (4 reigns)
- Longest reign: Ray Lyn (456 days)
- Shortest reign: Madison Rayne (28 days)

The IWC Women's Championship is a professional wrestling women's championship in the wrestling promotion International Wrestling Cartel. The title was first awarded on December 10, 2016, when Britt Baker defeated Marti Belle, April Sera, and Sonya Strong in a four-way elimination match by last eliminating Sera.

As of November 2, 2024, there have been fourteen reigns among nine wrestlers. The inaugural champion was Britt Baker. Katie Arquette has the most reigns at four. Ray Lyn has the longest singular reign at 456 days. Madison Rayne has the shortest singular reign at 28 days.

The current champion is Milla Moore. She defeated Lexus Synn at the Winner Take All 2024 on November 2, 2024 after Katie Arquette was forced to vacate the title due to injury.

== Title history ==
=== Names ===
Name	Time of use
IWC Women's Championship	December 10, 2016 – present

=== Reigns ===
Key
No.	Overall reign number
Reign	Reign number for the specific champion
Days	Number of days held
+	Current reign is changing daily

No.	Champion	Championship change			Reign statistics		Notes	Ref.
No.	Champion	Date	Event	Location	Reign	Days	Notes	Ref.
1	Britt Baker	December 10, 2016	Winner Takes All	Elizabeth, Pennsylvania	1	224	Baker defeated Marti Belle, April Sera, and Sonya Strong in a four-way elimination match by last eliminating Sera.	
2	LuFisto	July 22, 2017	Threat Level Midnight	Elizabeth, Pennsylvania	1	84		
3	Britt Baker	October 14, 2017	Unbreakable	Elizabeth, Pennsylvania	2	393	This was a three-way match that included Ray Lyn.	
4	Katie Arquette	November 11, 2018	Winner Takes All	Elizabeth, Pennsylvania	1	98		
5	Madison Rayne	February 16, 2019	Cold Blooded	Elizabeth, Pennsylvania	1	28		
6	Katie Arquette	March 16, 2019	Eighteen	Elizabeth, Pennsylvania	2	147		
7	Ray Lyn	August 10, 2019	Caged Fury	Elizabeth, Pennsylvania	1	456		
8	Katie Arquette	November 7, 2020	Homecoming	Elizabeth, Pennsylvania	3	392		
9	Ella Shae	December 4, 2021	4th Annual Pittsburgh Classic	Elizabeth, Pennsylvania	1	441		
10	Ashley D'Amboise	January 22, 2022	Reloaded 8.0	Elizabeth, Pennsylvania	1	315		
11	Ray Lyn	December 3, 2022	5th Annual Pittsburgh Classic	Elizabeth, Pennsylvania	2	182		
12	Holidead	June 3, 2023	PlummerSlam	Elizabeth, Pennsylvania	1	182		
13	Katie Arquette	December 2, 2023	6th Annual Pittsburgh Classic	Elizabeth, Pennsylvania	4	336		
14	Milla Moore	November 2, 2024	Winner Take All	Elizabeth, Pennsylvania	1	137+	IWC Women’s Champion Katie Arquette was forced to vacate the title due to injury.	

== Reigns by combined length ==
Key

†	Indicates the current champion
+	Indicates the combined reign is changing daily

Rank	Wrestler	No. of reigns	Combined days
1	Katie Arquette	4	973
2	Ray Lyn	2	686
3	Britt Baker	2	617
4	Ella Shae	1	441
5	Ashley D'Amboise	1	315
6	Holidead	1	182
7	LuFisto	1	84
8	Milla Moore†	1	137+
9	Madison Rayne	1	28
