= RJ City =

Canadian professional wrestling broadcaster

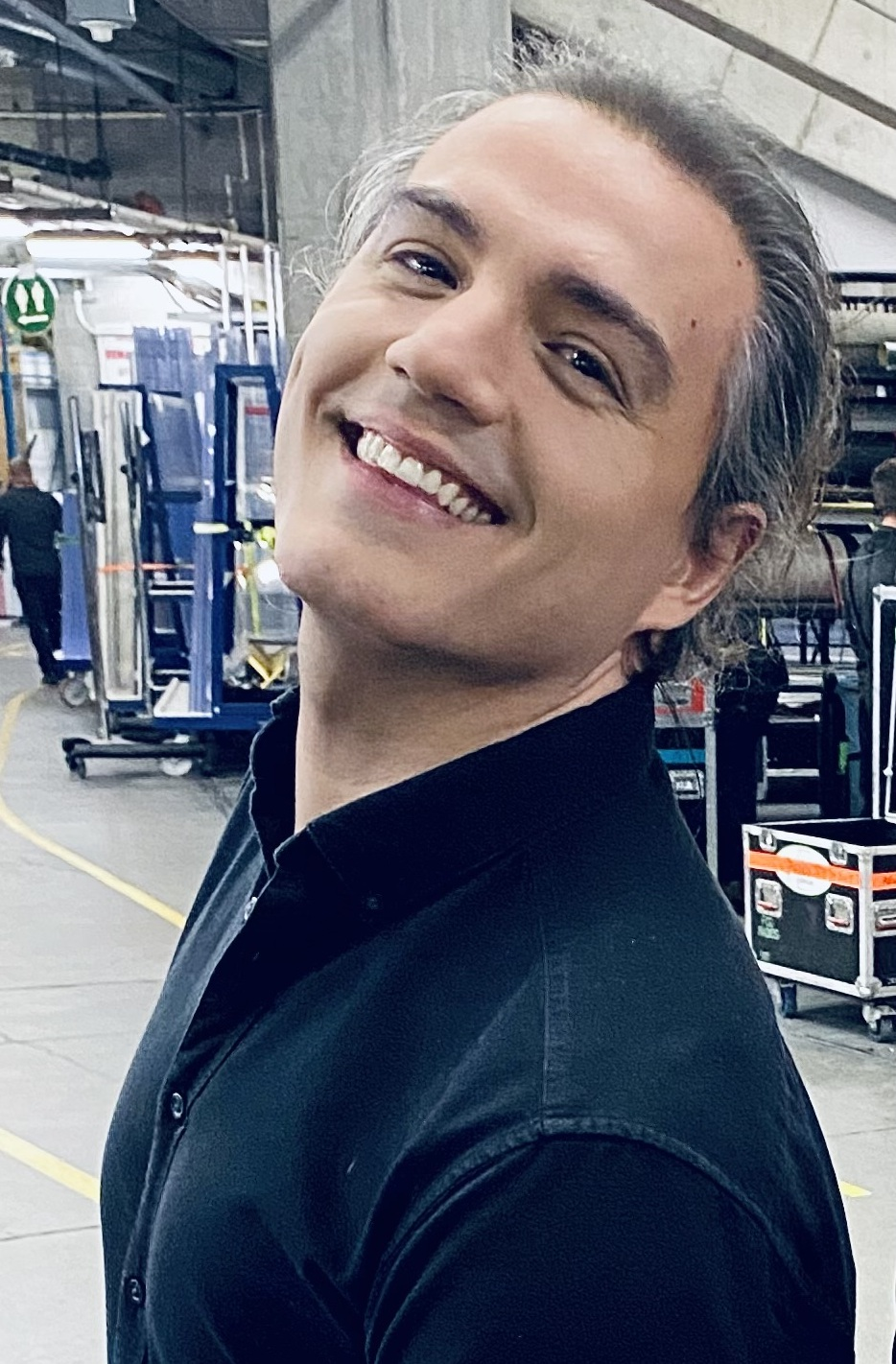
- RJ City in March 2024

Personal information
- Born: RJ Skinner; July 18, 1988 (age 38) Richmond Hill, Ontario, Canada

Professional wrestling career
- Ring name(s): RJ City; RJ Metropolis
- Billed height: 6 ft 2 in (188 cm)
- Billed weight: 210 lb (95 kg)
- Debut: 2006
- Retired: 2026

RJ Skinner (born July 18, 1988), better known by his ring name RJ City, is a Canadian-American former professional wrestler. He is signed to All Elite Wrestling (AEW), where he is a writer, occasional on-screen interviewer, host of AEW's YouTube series Hey!(EW), and co-host of Meal & A Match alongside Renee Paquette on the TBS YouTube channel. He previously wrestled on the independent circuit.

RJ City began hosting pre-show segments alongside Renee Paquette on June 25, 2023, at the Forbidden Door pay-per-view. He also hosts several shows on AEW's YouTube channel including Hey! (EW), which was awarded Best Talent Media of the Year by Fightful in 2023.

== Professional wrestling career ==
=== Independent circuit (2006–2022) ===
Skinner began training to be a professional wrestler after graduating high school. His trainers were John Rambo and Johnny Wave. His first match was an unpaid dark match against Joey Valentyne on August 19, 2006. Skinner was an active in-ring competitor on the independent wrestling circuit. He has also wrestled matches in IWC, Impact, and Ring of Honor. He notably appeared on Impact Wrestling in 2018, teaming with David Arquette. In late 2018, Arquette had expressed an interest in making an in-ring wrestling return and began training with Peter Avalon. Arquette's wrestling comeback was documented in You Cannot Kill David Arquette. Skinner slapped Arquette at the red carpet premier for 350 Days, further publicizing their ongoing feud. Behind the scenes, Skinner helped train and mentor Arquette and the two became close friends. On July 15, 2018, the two faced off in a match for the promotion Championship Wrestling From Hollywood (CWFH) with Skinner taking the win. The two then wrestled as a tag team, sometimes referred to as Arquette City, until their final match together on New Year's Day 2020, which resulted in a win for the duo.

=== All Elite Wrestling (2023–present) ===
In 2023, RJ City began working for All Elite Wrestling (AEW) as a writer, on-screen interviewer, and host of the pre-show panels for pay-per-view events alongside Renee Paquette while also hosting his own show "Hey! (EW)" on AEW's YouTube channel. When asked about his current professional wrestling career status in an interview with Fightful, Skinner has stated that he is not retired.

RJ City worked closely with AEW owner and President Tony Khan to produce the yearlong story between "Timeless" Toni Storm and Mariah May, with Khan describing him as his "right hand" in the writing process.

== Championships and accomplishments ==
- Conflict Wrestling
  - CW Heavyweight Championship (1 time)
- Destiny World Wrestling
  - Destiny World Championship (1 time)
- Empire State Wrestling
  - ESW Heavyweight Championship (1 time)
  - ESW Interstate Championship (1 time)
  - ESW Tag Team Championship (1 time) - with Gregory Iron
- Great Canadian Wrestling
  - GCW Canadian National Championship (1 time)
  - GCW Ontario Independent Championship (1 time)
- Greektown Pro Wrestling
  - Greektown Wrestling Championship (1 time)
- International Wrestling Cartel
  - IWC Super Indy Championship (1 time)
  - IWC World Heavyweight Championship (1 time)

== Other media ==
Skinner hosted a weekly YouTube series called RJ Makes Coffee in his Underwear.

In Season 7 Episode 7 of Celebrity Family Feud, Skinner competed as part of Team Arquette, which also consisted of professional wrestlers David Arquette, Jack Perry, Peter Avalon, and Dalton Castle.

=== WWE Digital Content ===
Skinner also produced various digital content for WWE from 2020-2021, appearing primarily as a host and interviewer. Skinner participated in pay-per-view watch alongs and wrote sketches for WrestleMania After Dark with RJ City, which premiered on WWE's YouTube channel immediately following WrestleMania 37. He also made regular appearances on The Bump, where he had a recurring segment called Wednesday Morning Wake-Up, where he interviewed WWE Superstars and celebrities. Skinner engaged with WWE Superstars in humorous and entertaining interviews, adding a unique flair by providing a blend of comedy and insight, making his segments popular among fans.

Skinner played a significant supporting role in the 2020 documentary You Cannot Kill David Arquette as David Arquette's friend and wrestling partner.

== Filmography ==
In addition to appearing in multiple professional wrestling promotions online and on television, Skinner has acted in series and films. Skinner is an ACTRA union member. In 2014, Skinner won the Canadian Screen Award for Best Children's Nonfiction for his role as Gildar in Splatalot!.

Year	Title	Role
2021	RJ City: Wrestling Raconteur	Self/RJ City
2020	You Cannot Kill David Arquette	Self/RJ City
2016	The Masked Saint	Iceman
2015	Murdoch Mysteries (1 episode)	The Gladiator
2013	Club Utopia	Steve (Bouncer #1)
2012	My Babysitter's a Vampire (1 episode)	Egyptian Guard #1
2011	The Big Smoke	Wrestler
2011	Monster Brawl	Mummy & Werewolf
2011-2013	Splatalot! (series regular)	Gildar
