= Larry Sweeney =

American professional wrestler and professional wrestling manager (1981 – 2011)

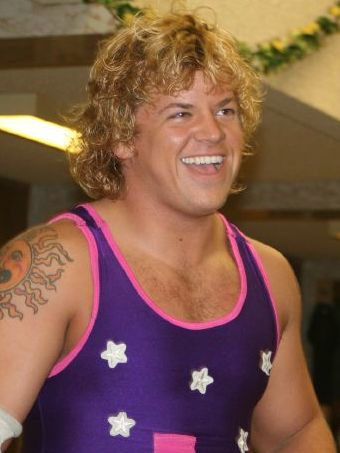
- Sweeney in 2008

Personal information
- Born: Alexander K. Whybrow; February 18, 1981 Chicago, Illinois, U.S.
- Died: April 11, 2011 (aged 30) Lake Charles, Louisiana, U.S.
- Cause of death: Suicide by hanging

Professional wrestling career
- Ring name(s): Larry Sweeney; Vökoder
- Billed height: 5 ft 9 in (1.75 m)
- Billed weight: 183 lb (83 kg)
- Trained by: Mike Quackenbush; Chris Hero; Buddy Rose; Colonel DeBeers; Skayde
- Debut: May 1, 2004

Alexander K. Whybrow (February 18, 1981 – April 11, 2011) was an American professional wrestler and manager, better known by his ring name Larry Sweeney. He performed primarily on the American independent circuit, but also competed in Canada, Mexico, Japan and Europe.

== Professional wrestling career ==
Sweeney's first professional match took place at the Windy City Pro Wrestling Battle of the Belts 2000 on May 20, 2000, at the Hammond Civic Center in Hammond, Indiana. He wrestled under the ring name 'El Zapatista' and participated in a three-ring, 120-man battle royale. He did not decide to pursue a career in professional wrestling until 2002, when he was living in India and training in amateur wrestling at the Sri Satpal Pehlewan Akhara at the Chattrasol Stadium in Model Town, Delhi, India. After returning to the states and completing his studies, he enrolled in the Chikara Wrestle Factory in Allentown, Pennsylvania, in September 2003, under head trainer Mike Quackenbush and co-instructors Chris Hero and Skayde. Sweeney also received training from Buddy Rose and Colonel DeBeers in Portland, Oregon, before debuting on May 1, 2004, in Ludlow, Massachusetts.

On June 16, 2005, he defeated veteran wrestler Glen Osbourne for the PWE Heavyweight Championship in Mechanicsburg, Pennsylvania. He went on to hold the title for 11 months before losing it to Mike Quackenbush in May 2006; in the meantime he had become a regular for many of the larger independent wrestling companies in the US. In July 2006, he represented Chikara at MXW's InterPromotional Incident. On July 31, 2006, Sweeney made an appearance on Raw, broadcast live from the Meadowlands Arena in New Jersey, where he played an imposter Nick Hogan in a segment titled "Orton Knows Best". Later that year, he was the subject of the 'Introducing' feature article in the national magazine The Wrestler.

2007 saw him go on to a feud with Bryan Alvarez over the ICW/ICWA Texarkana Television Championship. On May 11, 2007, in McKeesport, Pennsylvania, he won the IWC Super Indy Title after defeating "Black Machismo" Jay Lethal, Azrieal, and Shiima Xion in a one-night tournament. He went on to feud for the title with "Fabulous" John McChesney, who defeated him for the title on July 7. After chasing McChesney for over six months, Sweeney regained the title on January 19, 2008, after winning a Texarkana Death Match. On July 20, 2007, Sweeney was crowned the first CWE Undisputed Champion after defeating Eddie Kingston and Chris Hero in separate matches in Youngstown, Ohio.

He competed in a War Games match for the NWA Upstate promotion in Rochester, New York, in April 2007, after successfully defending the ICW/ICWA title against Eddie Kingston in a strap match the night before at Colgate University. On May 18, 2007, he lost to wrestling legend Kamala at Women's Superstar United in New York City. Sweeney made his debut with the Hawaii-based promotion Action Zone Wrestling on January 7, 2008, facing CIMA at their event Battleclash III, a match billed on his 'ain't no doubt about it' DVD as the 66th Pearl Harbor anniversary showdown. He also participated in a Boxer vs Wrestler match against Larry Barnes (44–3–0, 17 KO's) on April 5, 2008, in New Rochelle, New York, at New Rochelle High School for the New York State Wrestling Federation.

In November 2008 he announced the formation of his own company, Bad Brothers of Wrestling (BBOW). Sweeney promoted two shows, in April 2007 and October 2008, at Colgate University and announced plans to run shows at schools and carnivals, primarily in the Midwest.

=== Chikara (2004–2009) ===
After being trained at the Chikara Wrestle Factory, Sweeney made his debut for the promotion on July 10, 2004, at the second annual Young Lions Cup, as the leader of Sweet 'n' Sour International, a stable of wrestlers who had been denied wildcard spots in the tournament. Throughout the tournament Sweeney's stable mates interfered in his matches and in the end he defeated Jigsaw to win the Chikara Young Lions Cup in only his seventh professional match. Jigsaw was looking for a rematch with Sweeney, but he was more interested in the bigger Chikara names, such as Chris Hero and Mike Quackenbush. On October 30, 2004, Sweeney's stable met a group led by Jigsaw in an eight on eight torneo cibernetico match. Sweeney was pinned by Jigsaw, after his stable mate Spyrazul turned on him and then unmasked himself as Quackenbush. On November 19 Sweeney lost the Young Lions Cup to Jigsaw in his first defense.

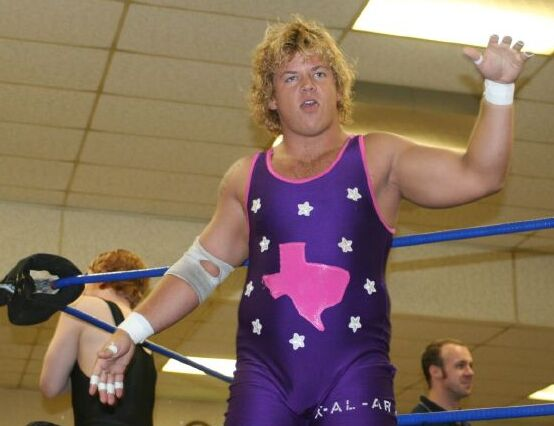
Sweeney in 2008

Sweeney entered the 2005 Tag World Grand Prix with Share Cropper, but they were eliminated from the tournament in the first round by Shane Storm and Mister ZERO. On May 20 Sweeney and Cropper were defeated by Jolly Roger and Lance Steel in a "Crybaby/Slave for a Month" match and as a result the entire Sweet 'n' Sour International were forced to wear diapers the following night. Sweeney refused to do this and after Crossbones pulled off his towel to reveal the diaper, Sweeney fired all of his stable mates and disbanded Sweet 'n' Sour International.

The following month Sweeney brought his ICW-ICWA Texarkana Television Championship to Chikara and debuted his new bodyguard, Mana the Polynesian Warrior. On March 31 Sweeney lost the Texarkana Television title to Milano Collection A.T. and after Sweeney and Mana were defeated on April 21 by Lance Steel and Lance Steel, Mana turned on Sweeney. The following month Sweeney debuted his new talk show segment, Winner's Circle, and then cleanly defeated Mana before regaining the Texarkana title from Milano Collection A.T. Sweeney then started a feud with Eddie Kingston, to whom he would lose the Texarkana title on July 22. During the feud Sweeney and Kingston performed an angle, where Sweeney ran over Kingston with a car. Sweeney recaptured the Texarkana title in Canada, but on November 18, 2006, at Talent Borrows, Genius Steals Kingston defeated him in a "Yellow Belly Strap match" to win the feud.

In 2007 Sweeney's Ring of Honor relationship with Chris Hero entered Chikara, when on April 22 he helped Hero defeat Claudio Castagnoli and thus force him back into The Kings of Wrestling. The following month Hero, Sweeney and Castagnoli joined forces with Team F.I.S.T. (Icarus, Gran Akuma and Chuck Taylor) to form the Kings of Wrestling superstable. The stable was later joined by Mitch Ryder, Shayne Hawke and Max Boyer. On December 9 Castagnoli defeated Hero, who afterwards left Chikara for good, thus disbanding the Kings of Wrestling. Sweeney continued to team with Mitch Ryder and Shayne Hawke as the Fabulous Three and together they made it to the quarter-finals of the 2008 King of Trios tournament, before losing to the Golden Trio of Delirious, Hallowicked and Helios. After a series of trios losses, Ryder fired Sweeney from the group on June 15, 2008, after which Sweeney turned tecnico for the first time in his Chikara career. After months of trying to earn the trust of former Kings of Wrestling stable mate Claudio Castagnoli, he finally agreed to team with Sweeney on December 14. However, in the match against the Fabulous Two Sweeney turned on Castagnoli by hitting him with brass knucks and re-joined Ryder and Hawke.

On January 25, 2009, at Revelation X Sweeney called out Castagnoli, despite knowing that he was at the time wrestling in Japan for Pro Wrestling Noah. Chikara Director of Fun Leonard F. Chikarason came out and announced that since Shayne Hawke was unable to make it to the show, the Fabulous Three were taken out of the 2009 King of Trios. That same night Sweeney and Ryder defeated Los Ice Creams (El Hijo del Ice Cream and Ice Cream, Jr.), but this would end up being Sweeney's final appearance for the company for the time being, as afterwards Ryder left the company and the Fabulous Three quietly disbanded.

=== Ring of Honor (2006–2009) ===
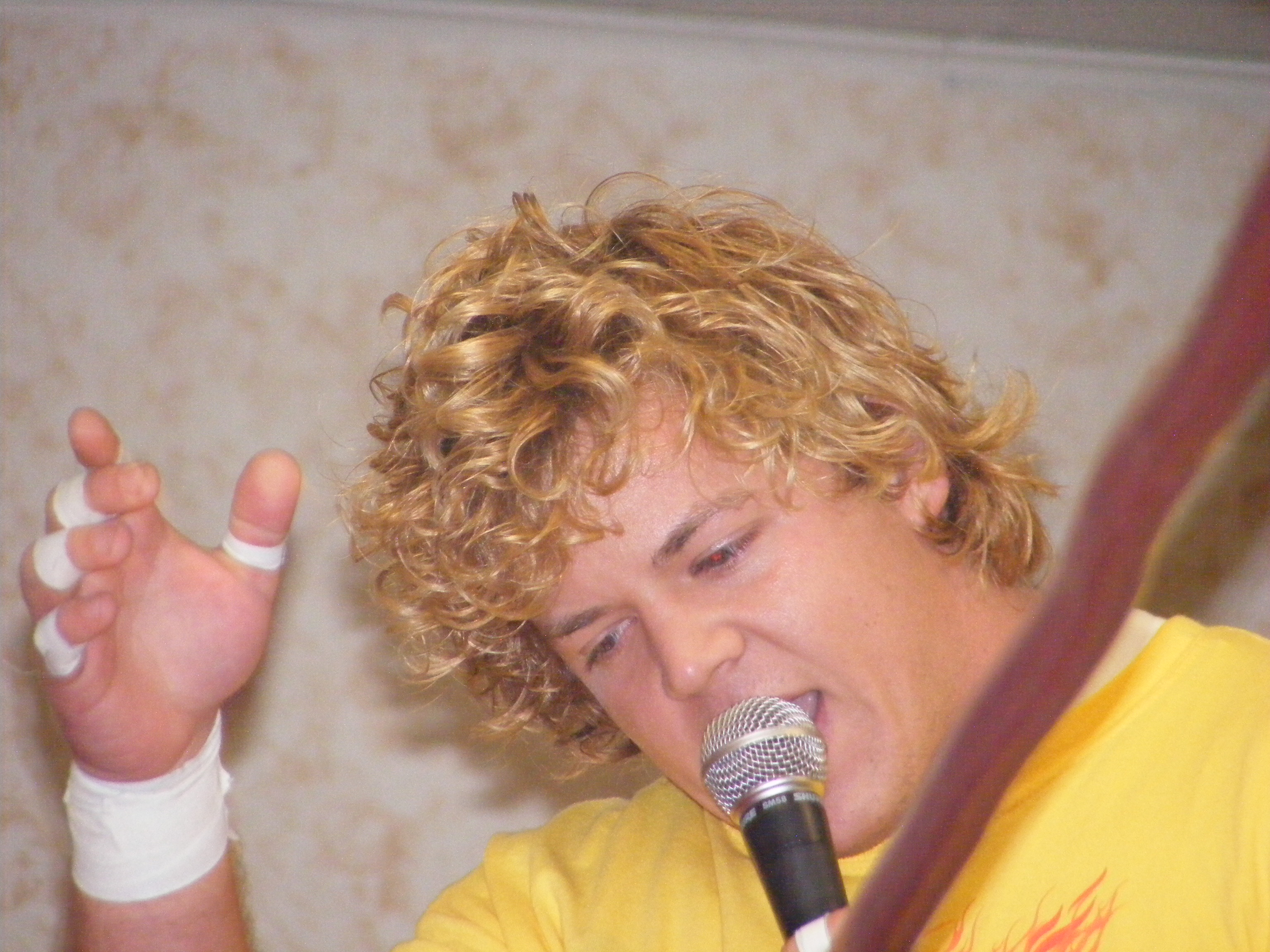
Sweeney cutting a promo in 2008

On December 23, 2006, Sweeney made his debut in Ring of Honor (ROH), interfering on behalf of the Kings of Wrestling (Chris Hero and Claudio Castagnoli) in their win against the Briscoe Brothers. The following night, Hero announced that Sweeney was in ROH as his new agent. Sweeney went on to form Sweet 'n' Sour Inc., an agency consisting of Sweeney's "clients": Chris Hero, Sara Del Rey, personal trainer Tank Toland, and Bobby Dempsey. Matt Sydal was briefly a part of Sweet & Sour Inc. during the summer of 2007, but left when Sweeney signed him to a developmental contract with World Wrestling Entertainment. Daniel Puder was also briefly part of the stable in January 2008 but later quietly departed ROH. In February 2008 he declared a hostile takeover attempt of ROH and signed Adam Pearce, Brent Albright, and Shane Hagadorn in the wake of this declaration. On April 11, 2008, he recruited Eddie Edwards into the group as well.

On May 10, 2008, Brent Albright quit the group following a loss where he and Chris Hero lost a scramble match to Delirious and Pelle Primeau (also included were Jack Evans and Ruckus). Sweeney ordered him to beat down Bobby Dempsey with the rest of the group but instead he delivered suplexes to every member aside from Sweeney, who escaped from the ring. On June 6, Sweeney made an offer to No Remorse Corps leader Roderick Strong to join him in his stable. Strong declined as he had done in the past only to find himself attacked and beaten down by his NRC stable mate Davey Richards. Richards proceeded to tear away his NRC T-shirt to reveal he was wearing a Sweet N' Sour, Inc. shirt underneath, joining the stable. On June 28, 2008, in Chicago Ridge, Illinois, Sweeney proudly welcomed the newest member of Sweet N' Sour, Inc., Go Shiozaki, into the fold as well as welcome back returning member Tank Toland.

During his time in ROH, Sweeney wrestled only four matches for the promotion; he defeated Claudio Castagnoli in a singles match at Final Battle 2007, competed in a six-man tag team match in spring 2008, defeated Roderick Strong in a gauntlet match in August 2008 and wrestled in a tag team match with Davey Richards in December 2008. His largely non-wrestling role in ROH earned him the Wrestling Observer Newsletter award for "Best Non-Wrestler" in 2007 and 2008.

On October 19, 2008, Sweeney made an appearance at Shimmer Women Athletes taping, the sister promotion of ROH. He cut a promo about how his client in ROH Sara Del Rey would get her Shimmer Championship rematch in ROH. Later in the evening he would pull Del Rey out of the ring to save her from MsChif and Serena Deeb. On April 20, 2009, Sweeney announced on his official MySpace page that he had quit ROH over monetary issues. On December 19, 2009, at Final Battle 2009, ROH's first live pay-per-view, Sweeney returned to the company as a color commentator, but did not make any appearances after that.

=== Hiatus and return (2010) ===
On August 14, 2010, Sweeney wrestled his first match after a 14-month hiatus, losing to Dan Lawrence at an AAW Wrestling event.

On July 26, 2010, Sweeney returned to Chikara at Chikarasaurus Rex: King of Show, where he, disguised as Vökoder, a cyborg, previously portrayed by Tim Donst, stared down his Bruderschaft des Kreuzes partner Pinkie Sanchez. Vökoder made his next appearance on August 29, eliminating Sanchez from The Countdown Showdown battle royal. While it was at this point still a mystery who was portraying Vökoder, Sweeney went public with his hatred for Sanchez on the In Your Head radio show. On October 19 it was announced that Vökoder would take the final open spot on UltraMantis Black's Team Chikara in the torneo cibernetico match, where they would face BDK. During the torneo cibernetico match on October 23, Vökoder was unmasked as Sweeney. He managed to eliminate Sanchez from the match, before being eliminated himself by Claudio Castagnoli. Sweeney posted a blog entry on Chikara's official site on December 29, 2010, where he announced he would return to the promotion in 2011, but he died before doing so.

During the first night of Chikara's 2011 King of Trios tournament on April 15, a memorial service was held in Sweeney's memory before the show. Many of Sweeney's fellow wrestlers also wrestled with a pink and purple armband, while Mike Quackenbush and Jigsaw used his signature moves to win their match. Eddie Kingston also used the song "Highwayman" by The Highwaymen, which was one of Sweeney's favorite songs, as his entrance theme on the second night. Shortly afterwards, Chikara named the tournament to crown the first ever Chikara Grand Champion, the 12 Large: Summit in memory of Whybrow. At the finals of the tournament on November 13, 2011, at High Noon, Whybrow's brother Oliver presented tournament winner Eddie Kingston with the championship belt.

== Personal life ==
Whybrow was born in Chicago, Illinois, and was raised in Wilmette, Illinois, with two siblings. He graduated from New Trier High School and Oberlin College. As a junior at Oberlin, he travelled to India for a study-abroad program, and became interested in wrestling after seeing it there. He later moved to and resided in Pennsylvania. Whybrow suffered from bipolar disorder and had a mental breakdown in 2009, which he called "the absolute worst event" of his life at the time.

Prior to becoming a professional wrestler, Whybrow worked as a house painter, blacksmith's apprentice, traveling carny and Kaplan tutor.

== Death ==
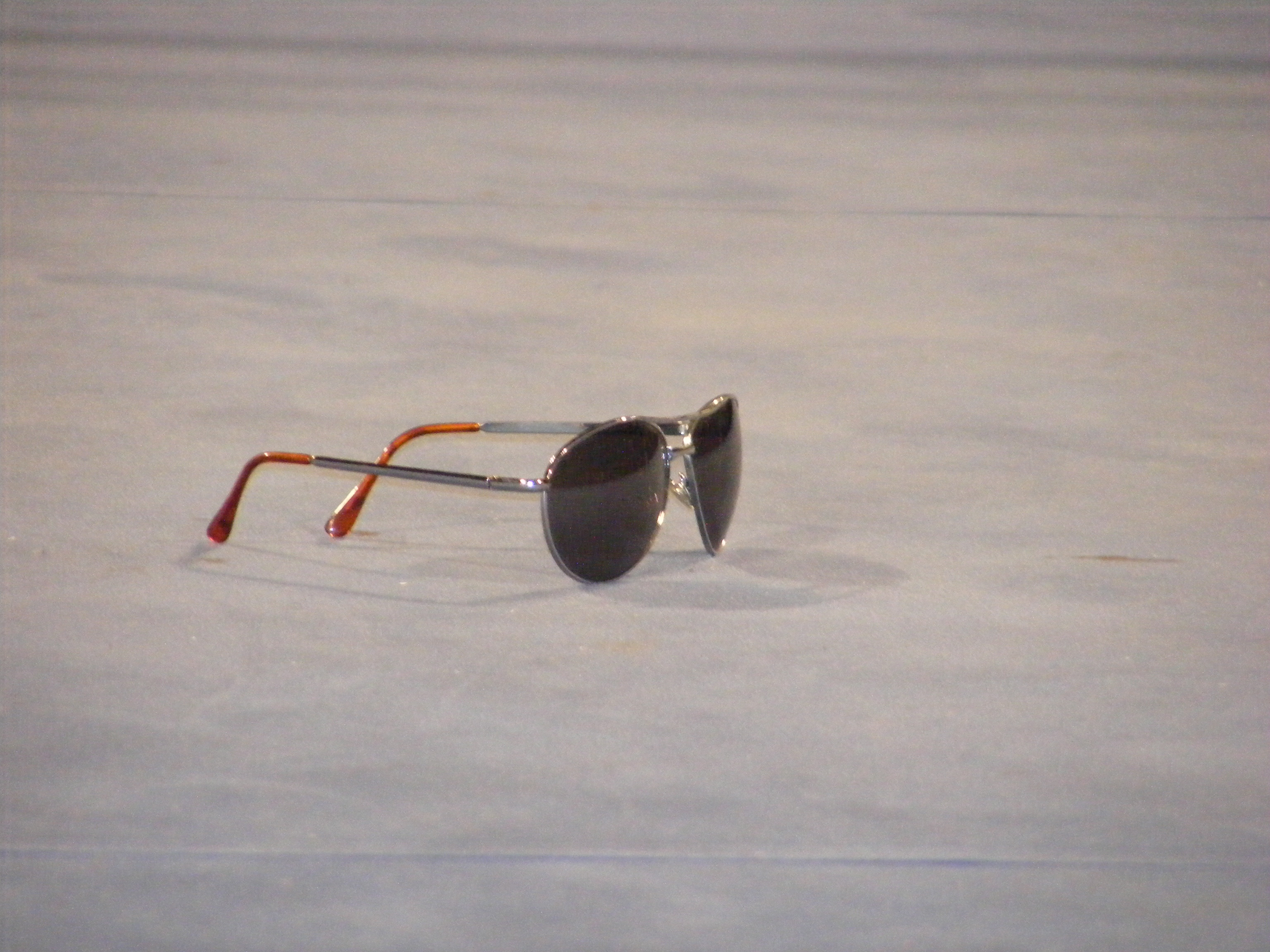
Chikara paying tribute to Whybrow on April 15, 2011

Whybrow was found dead on the morning of April 11, 2011, at the age of 30, after he died by suicide by hanging himself from a turnbuckle post at a Lake Charles, Louisiana wrestling school.

== Championships and accomplishments ==
- Chikara
  - Young Lions Cup II
- Championship Wrestling Experience
  - CWE Undisputed Championship (1 time)
- International Wrestling Cartel
  - IWC Super Indy Championship (2 times)
  - Super Indy VI tournament (2007)
- Pro Wrestling Entertainment
  - PWE Heavyweight Championship (1 time)
- Pro Wrestling WORLD-1
  - WORLD-1 Tag Team Championship (1 time) – with King Kaluha
- Ring of Honor
  - ROH Year-End Award
    - Best Talker Award (2007)
- Ultimate Championship Wrestling
  - UCW Heavyweight Championship (1 time)
- Wrestling Observer Newsletter
  - Best Non-Wrestler (2007, 2008)

== See also ==
- List of premature professional wrestling deaths
