= Wardlow (wrestler) =

American professional wrestler (born 1988)

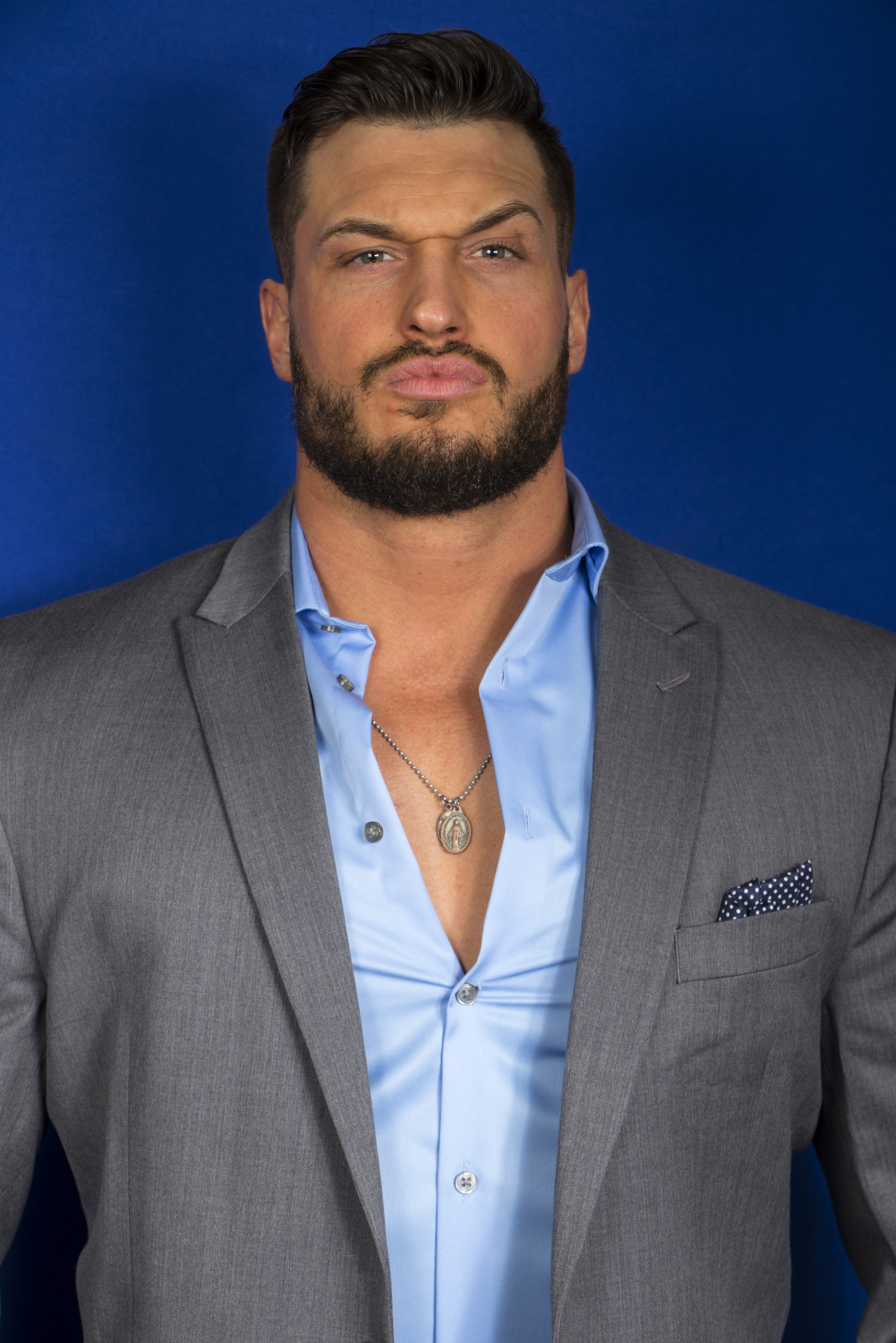
- Wardlow in 2018

Personal information
- Born: Michael Austin Wardlow; January 19, 1988 (age 38) Middlefield, Ohio, U.S.

Professional wrestling career
- Ring name(s): Michael Wardlow; Wardlow
- Billed height: 6 ft 3 in (191 cm)
- Billed weight: 266 lb (121 kg)
- Billed from: Cleveland, Ohio
- Trained by: Josh Emanuel; Lou Gotti
- Debut: 2014

Michael Austin Wardlow (born January 19, 1988) is an American professional wrestler. He is signed to All Elite Wrestling (AEW), where he performs under the mononymous ring name Wardlow and is a member of the Don Callis Family. He is a former three-time AEW TNT Champion.

== Early life ==
Michael Wardlow was born in Middlefield, Ohio. He was raised by a single mother and has two older sisters. He has a background in boxing and jujitsu.

== Professional wrestling career ==
=== Early career (2014–2019) ===
Wardlow made his professional wrestling debut on March 15, 2014, for the independent promotion, American Revolution Wrestling, where he was defeated by Nickie Valentino. In the following years, Wardlow began to wrestle in other promotions, including the International Wrestling Cartel (IWC). In December 2016, Wardlow won his first championship by way of defeating RJ City to capture the vacant IWC Heavyweight Championship. He would win the title on two further occasions. Also around this time, Wardlow had a try out to earn a developmental contract with WWE, but was not offered a position. Shortly after, he started training with Kurt Angle. He then spent another year on the indies winning titles. In March 2019, he won the IWC Super Indy Championship, but lost it to Josh Alexander in August. Also in 2019, Wardlow won the Revenge Pro Wrestling World Title.

=== All Elite Wrestling (2019–present) ===
==== Bodyguard of MJF and The Pinnacle (2019–2022) ====
At All Elite Wrestling (AEW)'s All Out pay-per-view on August 31, 2019, a video package aired, promoting Wardlow's impending debut. Wardlow made his debut for AEW on the November 13 episode of Dynamite, attacking Cody. He would then align himself with Cody's rival MJF and became his bodyguard. Wardlow wrestled his AEW debut match on the February 19, 2020, episode of Dynamite, where he lost to Cody in a steel cage match. In October, Wardlow would participate in a tournament to determine the number one contender for the AEW World Championship, defeating Jungle Boy in the first round before ultimately being eliminated by Adam Page in the semi-finals. Following this, Wardlow and MJF would join The Inner Circle faction, also consisting of Chris Jericho, Sammy Guevara, Jake Hager, Santana, and Ortiz. However, after months of tension within the group, Wardlow and MJF separated from The Inner Circle in March 2021 to form a new group called The Pinnacle, also made up of Shawn Spears and FTR (Cash Wheeler and Dax Harwood), sparking a feud between the two groups. At the Blood and Guts event on May 5, The Pinnacle defeated The Inner Circle in the inaugural Blood and Guts match. At the Double or Nothing pay-per-view later that month, The Pinnacle were defeated by The Inner Circle in a Stadium Stampede match. On the June 18 episode of Dynamite, Wardlow was defeated by Hager in a MMA rules cage match. On the August 11 episode, Wardlow faced Jericho, but was unsuccessful. On the December 8 episode, Wardlow competed in the Dynamite Dozen Battle Royale, but he was inadvertently eliminated by MJF, thus beginning to tease a face turn due to growing dissension with MJF. Over the following weeks, the tension would continue to grow as Wardlow came into conflict with Shawn Spears, MJF, and other members of The Pinnacle, culminating in the March 2, 2022, episode, where MJF slapped Wardlow in a heated confrontation.

On March 6, 2022, Wardlow won the "Face of the Revolution" ladder match at the Revolution pay-per-view, guaranteeing him a future match for the AEW TNT Championship. Later that same evening, Wardlow would help CM Punk defeat MJF (after helping MJF cheat his previous victory against Punk) during their Dog Collar match by handing him the AEW Dynamite Diamond Ring, thus turning face. On the following episode of Dynamite, Wardlow cemented his turn in a promo, declaring that he was no longer MJF's bodyguard and no longer a member of The Pinnacle. On the March 16, 2022, episode, Wardlow would lose his TNT Championship match to reigning champion Scorpio Sky following interference from MJF and Shawn Spears. Wardlow also had a confrontation with Austin Vanderford, who later assisted MJF and Spears in attacking him after the match ended. Within storyline, Wardlow was not employed by AEW but by MJF, who could forbid him from wrestling him or for AEW altogether. MJF set up stipulations under which he would let him out of the contract, such as being lashed 10 times. On the May 25 episode, Wardlow completed the final stipulation by defeating Spears in a steel cage match, with MJF serving unsuccessfully as the special guest referee. This guaranteed him a match with MJF at the Double or Nothing pay-per-view, where if Wardlow won, he would officially be released from his contract with MJF, but if he lost, he would be banned from obtaining a new AEW contract and would be required to remain under MJF's employment. At the event, Wardlow defeated MJF after hitting him with ten consecutive powerbombs to win the match and was freed of his contract; as a result, Wardlow also earned a new AEW contract which in storyline made him an official member of the AEW roster. On the June 1, 2022, episode of Dynamite, Wardlow wrestled in his first match as an official member of the AEW roster, defeating J.D. Drake.

==== TNT Champion (2022–2023) ====
On the July 6 episode of Dynamite, Wardlow defeated Scorpio Sky in a street fight to win the TNT Championship, his first championship in AEW. Wardlow's first defense of the title was against Orange Cassidy on the first night of the Fyter Fest event on July 13, 2022. Wardlow beat Cassidy with his powerbomb finishing move, after catching the challenger midair. On the July 29, 2022, episode of Rampage, Wardlow intervened to save Cassidy from an attack by Jay Lethal. On the following episode of Dynamite, Lethal's manager, Sonjay Dutt, challenged Wardlow to defend his TNT Championship against his client. Wardlow accepted the challenge, and retained the title against Lethal at the Battle of the Belts III event on August 6, winning with a head butt and powerbomb finish. He then lost the title to Samoa Joe on November 19 at the Full Gear pay-per-view, ending his first TNT Championship reign at 136 days.

Wardlow regained the title from Joe at Revolution, on March 5, 2023, but his reign was cut short as 2023 Face of the Revolution ladder match winner Powerhouse Hobbs defeated Wardlow for the title by technical knockout in a Falls Count Anywhere match on the March 8 episode of Dynamite, ending his second reign at just three days. Wardlow would then defeat Hobbs in a rematch on the April 19 episode to win back the title, becoming a record-tying three-time TNT Champion. On June 17 at the premiere episode of Collision, Wardlow lost the TNT Championship title to Luchasaurus, ending his third reign at 59 days.

==== Undisputed Kingdom (2023–2024) ====
On the October 4 episode of Dynamite, Wardlow returned as a heel and defeated Griff Garrison after 5 consecutive Powerbombs. Wardlow defeated Matt Sydal on the October 10 episode of Dynamite by referee stoppage. He then defeated Ryan Nemeth on the October 18 episode of Dynamite. After the match, he motioned that he would be coming after AEW World Champion MJF. On December 30 at Worlds End, Wardlow revealed himself as one of The Devil's Masked Men, along with Roderick Strong, Matt Taven and Mike Bennett attacked MJF, with Adam Cole revealing himself as the Devil.

On the January 3, 2024 episode of Dynamite, Cole announced that the stable would be called The Undisputed Kingdom and laid out their goals, which included Wardlow capturing the AEW World Championship to give it to Cole. On March 3, 2024 at Revolution, Wardlow won an All-Star Scramble match where he received a future AEW World Championship match. On the following episode of Dynamite, Wardlow was scheduled to receive his AEW World Championship match against Samoa Joe the following week at Dynamite: Big Business, where Joe retained. In September 2024, fellow Undisputed Kingdom member Matt Taven, revealed that Wardlow, who went on hiatus in late April, had suffered a knee injury. During his hiatus, Wardlow was quietly removed from The Undisputed Kingdom.

==== Don Callis Family (2025–present) ====
On August 24, 2025 at Forbidden Door, Wardlow returned after a year-long hiatus, where he attacked Prince Nana and joined the Don Callis Family. On September 8, it was reported that Wardlow suffered a torn pectoral muscle during his return segment and would be out indefinitely.

On September 26, 2026 at All Out, a vignette aired that teased Wardlow's return after over a year on hiatus. He made his return on the September 30 Tribute to Pac memorial, where he teamed with his fellow Don Callis Family members Lance Archer, Jake Doyle, Josh Alexander, and Mark Davis in a losing effort against the Death Riders (Bryan Danielson, Claudio Castagnoli, Wheeler Yuta, Daniel Garcia, and Gabe Kidd). On November 4, Wardlow and his stablemates competed in a Blood and Guts match at the namesake event, where they were victorious. Following the match, Wardlow threw Darby Allin off the top of the cage.

== Championships and accomplishments ==
- All Elite Wrestling
  - AEW TNT Championship (3 times)
  - Face of the Revolution Ladder Match (2022)
- International Wrestling Cartel
  - IWC Super Indy Championship (1 time)
  - IWC World Heavyweight Championship (3 times)
  - Super 18 Tournament (2019)
- Pro Wrestling Illustrated
  - Faction of the Year (2021) – with The Inner Circle
  - Faction of the Year (2025) – with the Don Callis Family
  - Ranked No. 67 of the top 500 singles wrestlers in the PWI 500 in 2022
- Revenge Pro Wrestling
  - Revenge Pro World Championship (1 time)
