= Delirious (wrestler) =

American professional wrestler

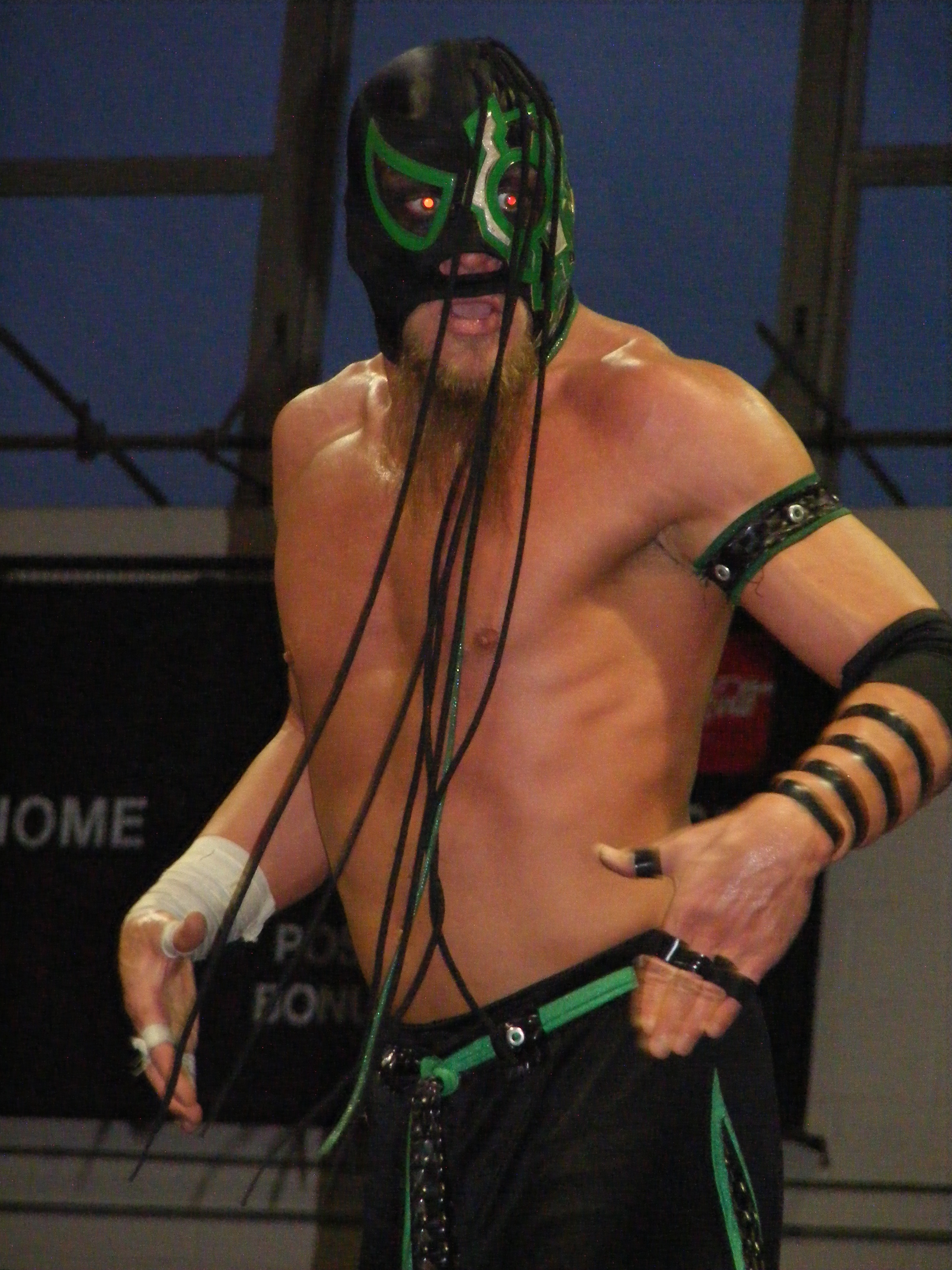
- Delirious in 2009

Personal information
- Born: Hunter Johnston; December 19, 1980 (age 45) Cairo, Illinois, U.S.
- Spouse: Mandy Leon (m. 2023)
- Children: 1

Professional wrestling career
- Ring name: Delirious
- Billed height: 5 ft 10 in (178 cm)
- Billed weight: 201 lb (91 kg)
- Billed from: "Dante's Inferno" "The Edge of Sanity" "The Swamps of Florida"
- Trained by: Gateway Championship Wrestling
- Debut: July 19, 2001

Hunter Johnston (born December 19, 1980) is an American professional wrestler, better known by his ring name Delirious. He is currently signed to Total Nonstop Action Wrestling (TNA) as an executive producer/head booker. He is known for his outrageous antics, such as running around aimlessly and screaming wildly when the opening ring bell sounds, and speaking in a rambling and mostly incoherent fashion. Delirious has competed internationally in Japan, Mexico, Austria, Germany and the United Kingdom. He is a former head booker of Ring of Honor and was an executive producer of the company's flagship television program, producing and writing over 500 episodes of weekly television along with producing and writing hundreds of live events in the 2010s. He also started as the head trainer for the company's wrestling school, the ROH Dojo in 2007.

== Professional wrestling career ==
=== Early career (2001–2003) ===
Delirious started his career in Gateway Championship Wrestling, an independent wrestling promotion based out of St. Louis, Missouri while also working at his local Best Buy. He trained Daizee Haze as a wrestler while they were both in Southeast Missouri State University.

=== IWA Mid-South (2003–2006) ===
Delirious started working for Ian Rotten and IWA Mid-South during the latter part of 2003. In November, he wrestled Matt Sydal, a fellow St. Louis wrestler, in Sydal's first IWA match. The two quickly developed a rivalry, wrestling several times over the next few months. Eventually, Delirious was able to beat Sydal at the second night of the 2004 King of the Death Match Tournament and won the IWA-MS Light Heavyweight Championship.

After that, Delirious began a feud with Jimmy Jacobs. The two exchanged in several matches with the title trading hands. Jimmy won the belt in early August on a Coliseum Championship Wrestling event in Evansville, Indiana. Two weeks later in Highland, Indiana, they wrestled to a double pin for the title. The belt was declared vacant. On the first night of the 2004 Ted Petty Invitational weekend, Jacobs won a Ladder match to win the vacant title. After that, Delirious went to Japan for a tour. When he returned, he won the belt on December 12. Delirious then finished the feud with a win in a Steel Cage match in Valparaiso, Indiana, on February 4, 2005.

Delirious held the Light Heavyweight title until June 11, when he lost it to Josh Abercrombie in Philadelphia. Delirious then wrestled several matches over the fall, against the likes of Roderick Strong, Ace Steel, and Brandon Thomaselli. He also formed a team with old rival Sydal. They challenged The Iron Saints for the IWA-MS Tag Team Championships on a couple of occasions, but could not win the belts.

Delirious started to appear less in 2006, but he defeated fellow masked wrestler El Generico in April.

=== Total Nonstop Action Wrestling (2003–2005) ===
Delirious made his debut on TNA (while TNA was associated with NWA) on the February 22, 2003, episode of TNA Xplosion losing to Shark Boy in a singles match. On the September 24 episode of TNA Xplosion, Delirious and Curt Daniels lost to Abyss in a Handicap match. On the October 8 episode of TNA Xplosion, Delirious and Sebastian lost to The Gathering (CM Punk and Julio Dinero). On the December 3 episode of TNA Xplosion, Delirious lost to Shark Boy. On the January 14, 2004, episode of TNA Xplosion, Delirious, Dylan Kage and Vordell Walker lost to 3Live Kru. On the January 21 episode of TNA Xplosion, Delirious, Jared Steele and Masada lost to 3Live Kru. On the February 4 episode of TNA Xplosion, Delirious and Shadow lost to America's Most Wanted (Chris Harris and James Storm). On the July 14 episode of TNA Xplosion, Delirious and Sebastian lost to D-Ray 3000 and Shark Boy. On September 8. 2004, NWATNA, Delirious and Jerrelle Clark competed in a Six Way X-Division Dominance Tag Team Elimination Battle Royal which was won by Kazarian and Mikey Batts. At Slammiversary, Delirious competed in a X Division Six-way match which was won by Shark Boy. His last match in the promotion was in a losing effort to Samoa Joe on the June 24, 2005, episode of iMPACT!.

=== Ring of Honor (2004–2022) ===
Delirious debuted in the Philadelphia-based promotion Ring of Honor at Reborn: Stage One on April 23, 2004, in a losing effort against rival Matt Sydal. Delirious continued to work for Ring of Honor sporadically throughout the next few years, gaining a cult following despite never winning a match. At Better Than Our Best on April 1, 2006, ROH's commissioner Jim Cornette said that he would face a wrestler of his choosing and if he did not win, he would be dropped from the roster. Delirious chose and defeated Ricky Reyes with the Cobra Stretch, retaining his spot on the roster.

The following show, Delirious defeated Jimmy Rave, Jimmy Yang and Jimmy Jacobs in a Four Corner Survival. Later in the show, Bryan Danielson granted Delirious a shot at the ROH World Championship after Danielson had retained it in five minutes against Colt Cabana. Danielson retained the belt when the referee stopped the match; Delirious' hand was also sliced on the ring post and his mask was torn by Danielson during the match.

Delirious would get a second shot at the ROH World Championship in a losing effort against Bryan Danielson on May 13. Delirious went on to earn a shot at the ROH Pure Championship against Nigel McGuinness, but subsequently lost. Throughout the rest of the year, Delirious continued to impress with matches against Matt Sydal and McGuinness. On October 6, Delirious defeated Jimmy Rave, qualifying for the 2006 Survival of the Fittest final later on in the evening. Austin Aries was the first eliminated in the finals leaving The Briscoe Brothers (Jay and Mark), Delirious and Matt Sydal. Sydal and Delirious worked together to eliminate the Briscoes. They put on a tough performance, with Delirious eventually coming out on top.

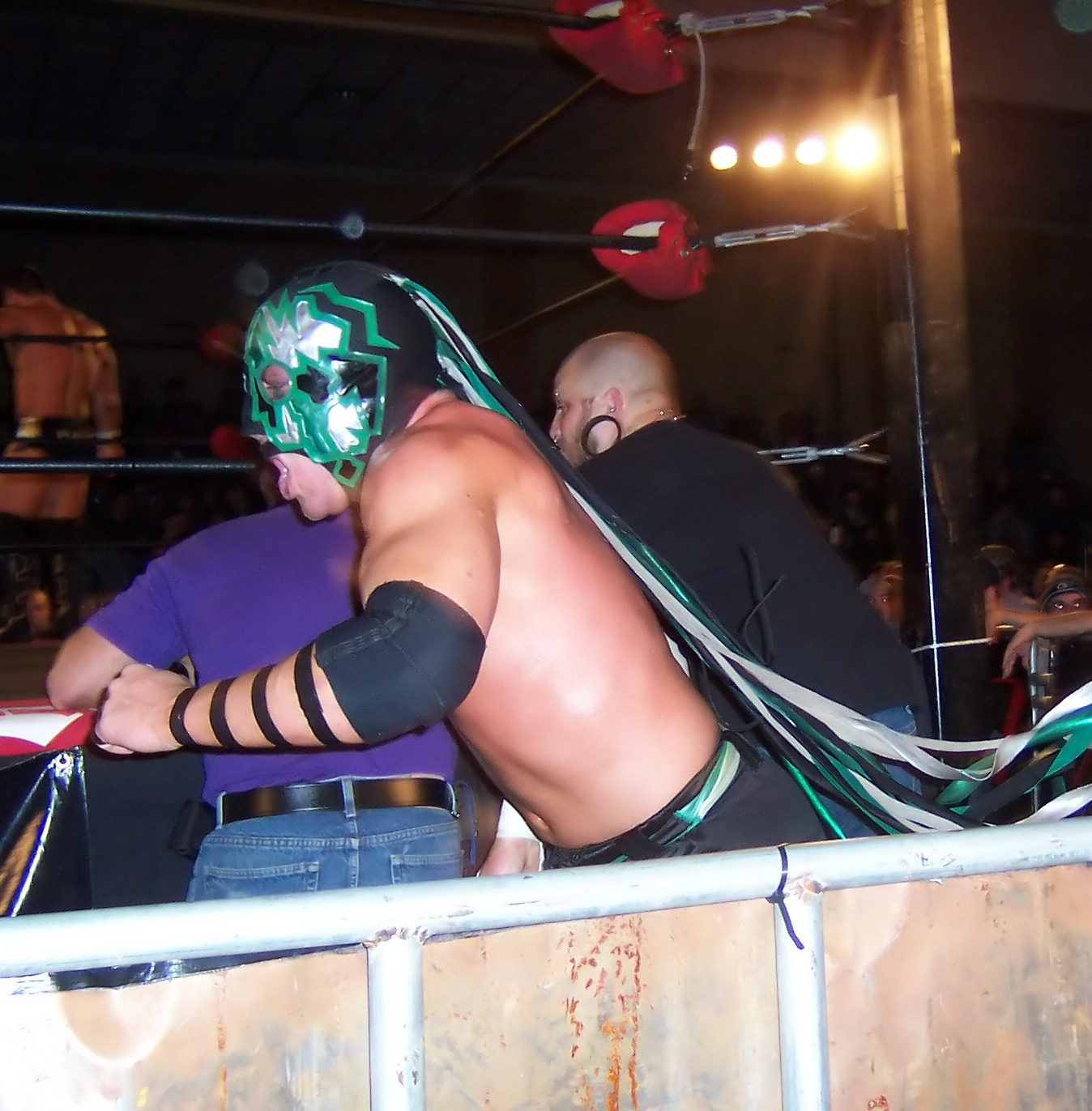
Delirious in 2006

His victory meant he'd receive his third shot at the ROH World Championship against Bryan Danielson. On November 3 the match took place, and once again Danielson retained despite Delirious' best efforts.

Delirious then teamed with Davey Richards, challenging eventual Tag Team Champions Matt Sydal and Christopher Daniels in a Number One Contenders match.

Following his loss, Sydal and Daniels went on to feud with Adam Pearce. Pearce defeated Delirious earlier on in the year with help from Shane Hagadorn. His first match in this new feud saw Delirious team with Ace Steel to take on Hagadorn and Pearce, Delirious and Steel came out on top, but this feud was far from over. The following night, Delirious put his problems with Pearce aside to challenge Danielson. The two captains put a team of four together for an eight-man elimination tag match. Delirious chose Nigel McGuinness, Colt Cabana and B. J. Whitmer as his partners to face the team of Danielson, Jimmy Rave, Jimmy Jacobs and Shingo. Delirious was the sole survivor for his team, winning the match when he made Danielson tap to the Cobra Stretch.

Delirious lost to Adam Pearce on December 22, as well as losing the following night in a Dragon Gate rules match against CIMA, Shingo and Matt Sydal. Delirious continued his feud with Pearce into 2007, defeating him in the first of six Fifth Year Festival events. He won via pinfall after placing brass knuckles in his mask and headbutting Pearce. The following night, the newly turned heel Roderick Strong destroyed Delirious after shoving him off the ropes. Delirious' head smacked against the mat and he appeared to be unconscious. Strong took advantage of Delirious' condition, hitting him with a Gibson Driver both in the ring and on a barricade at ringside. Strong looked to do more damage but Roderick's former tag team partner Austin Aries ran him off.

On August 3, 2007, Delirious was announced as the new head trainer of the ROH Wrestling Academy.

Delirious became more peculiar during his feud with Adam Pearce's stable, The Hangmen 3. After they stapled his mask to his face back in 2007, he began using violent tactics to defeat them such as using weapons and spitting mist into their faces. He also changed his usual green and black attire to "Red Poison", a red and black version, at Rising Above on December 29, 2007, to reflect his newly violent tactics.

Delirious later attempted to gain the attention of Daizee Haze only to be interrupted and overshadowed by Rhett Titus. After seeing footage of Titus and Haze together, he turned heel and joined up with Jimmy Jacobs and his Age of the Fall stable and began wearing a black version of his attire. On March 13 in Collinsville, Illinois, after Jacobs hit Haze with his spike, Delirious turned on him and broke away from the Age of the Fall. Delirious then started a feud with Sonjay Dutt, which ended rather quickly. Delirious later feuded with Austin Aries, starting on the May 3, 2010, edition of Ring of Honor Wrestling, when Aries kicked Delirious in the throat mid-match, causing a disqualification, followed by a beat down of both Delirious and his valet, Daizee Haze by Aries, Kenny King, and Rhett Titus. He teamed with Jerry Lynn to feud with them.

On August 15, 2010, Johnston replaced Adam Pearce as the head booker of Ring of Honor. Since this change, Delirious has wrestled only sporadically for the promotion, when he ended his feud with Aries by defeating him in a steel cage match on the September 20 episode of Ring of Honor Wrestling. Delirious made his return to a Ring of Honor ring on May 7 in Toronto, when he wrestled Colt Cabana in a Larry Sweeney tribute match.

In 2014, he began to increase his appearances in Ring of Honor more, mainly in their Illinois-based shows. On May 19, 2018, he became one of the trainers at the Baltimore Dojo.

=== International Wrestling Cartel (2005–2009) ===
Delirious and Matt Sydal debuted at No Excuses 2005 against each other with Delirious picking up the victory with the Chemical Imbalance II. He won IWC's biggest event of the year, the Super Indy 5 tournament, when he defeated Glen Spectre in the first round, Matt Sydal in the second and "Balls Hott" Troy Lords in the finals. He then went on to successfully defend his Super Indy title against Lords by making him tap out to a leglock submission at Summer Sizzler 3.

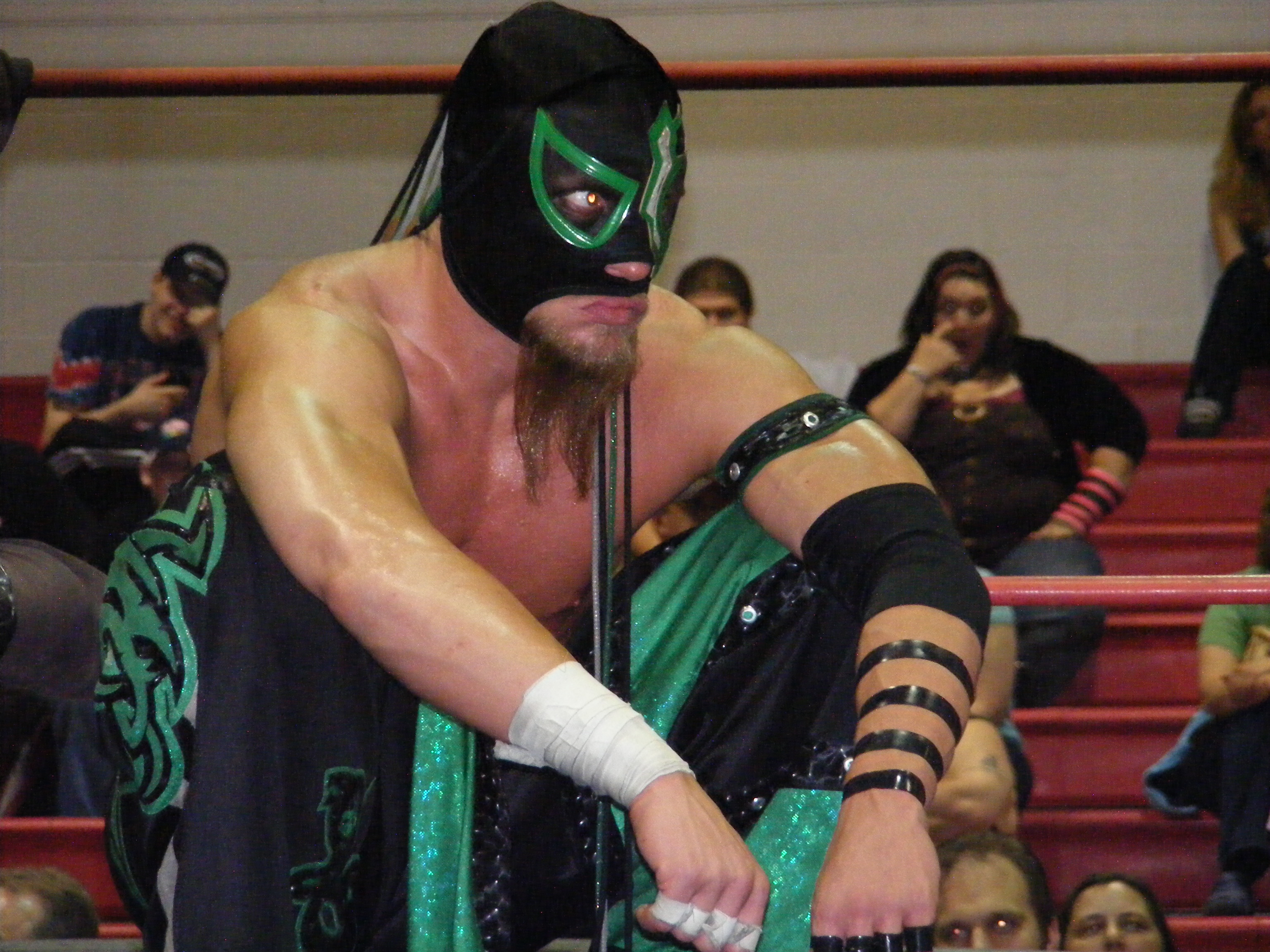
Delirious in the ring in 2009

He then started to be accompanied by women's wrestler Daizee Haze at ring side. He successfully defended his title against "The Fallen Angel" Christopher Daniels at Uncaged Fury. At No Excuses 2, Delirious began a feud with "The Fabulous" John McChesney. Haze distracted McChesney enough for Delirious to roll him up and grab his tights for the win to retain his title. At Reveangence 3 Delirious defeated McChesney again with some help from Daizee Haze. At November Pain 2, Delirious faced McChesney once again, but this time Haze was barred from ringside. Daizee disguised herself as a wrestling fan but McChesney caught on before she could intervene, resulting in McChesney powerbombing Daizee onto Delirious to get the win. At New Beginning 2, Delirious faced Sterling James Keenan to try to stop Keenan's road to the title. He was not successful, as Keenan hit the MK Ultra for the victory. He then took a break from IWC and did not return until several months later. He returned at November Pain 3 as he was scheduled to be partners with Super Hentai to face "The Shooter" Brent Albright and Sebastian Dark but it ended up being a 6-man tag team match after Shirly Doe and Delirious' rival John McChesney was added to the match. Shirly Doe picked up the victory by pinning Sebastian Dark after an over the shoulder back to belly piledriver to pick up the win for himself, Delirious, and Super Hentai. Delirious appeared at IWC's 100th show Call to Arms 4 on December 8, 2007, and defeated Eric Young. Throughout the spring and summer of 2008, he unsuccessfully went for the Super Indy title against Larry Sweeney and the IWC Championship against Dennis Gregory. Along with this, Gregory began making chauvinistic threats to Daizee Haze. This eventually climaxed with Delirious and Haze defeating Gregory and Sara Del Rey at Boiling Point 3. Two months later, at Promotional Consideration Paid For By the Following: Day 2, Delirious finally regained the Super Indy title, pinning Jason Gory in a Fatal Four Way match that also involved Super HENTAI and Larry Sweeney.

=== Chikara (2005–2014) ===
==== Incoherence (2005–2009) ====
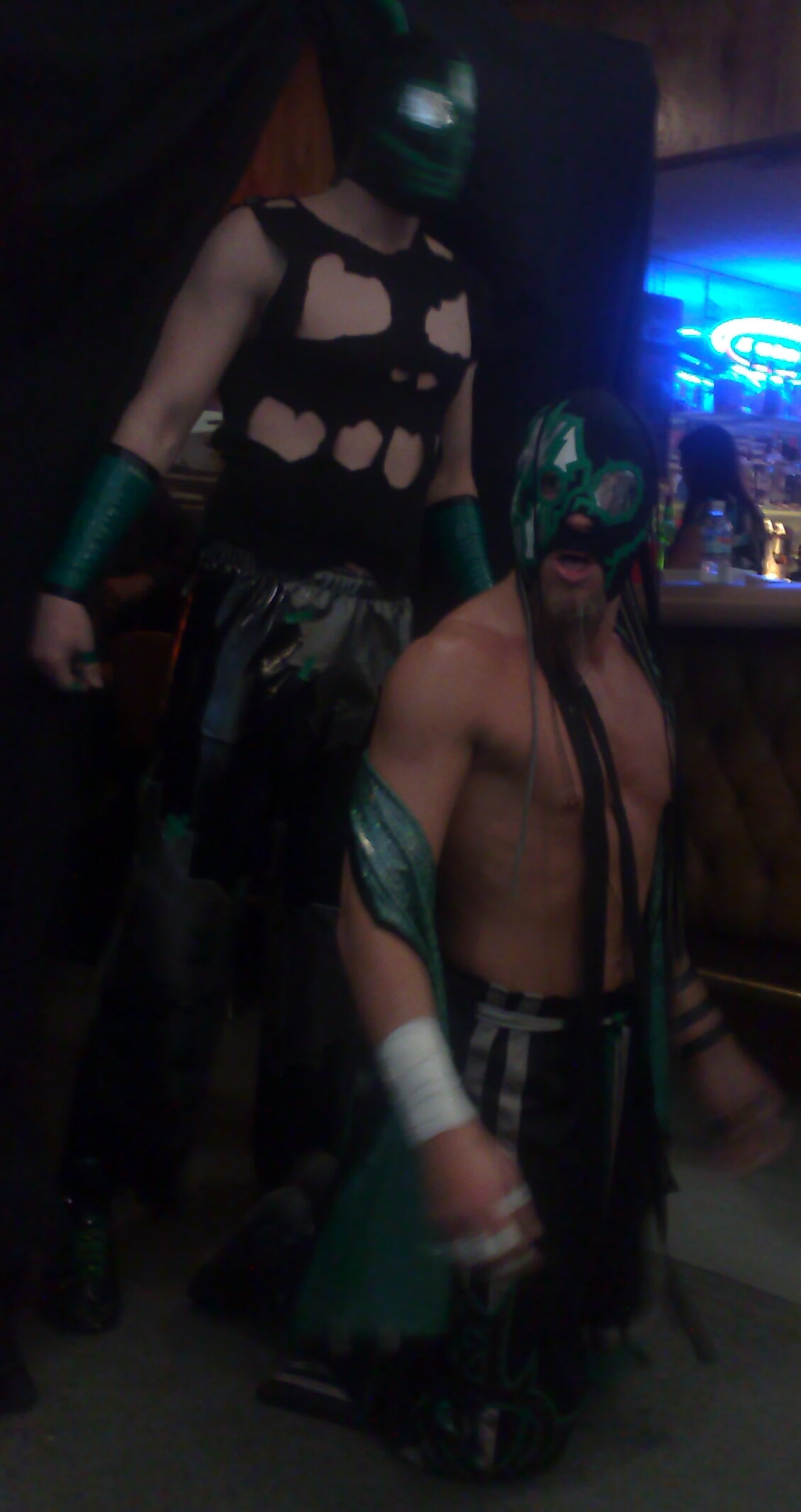
Incoherence making their entrance at Pro Wrestling Guerrilla's ¡Dia de los Dangerous! event

In Chikara, Delirious teamed with Hallowicked throughout 2006 under the team moniker Incoherence (also nicknamed Halirious by the fans). The team came about at Chikara's Tag World Grand Prix in 2006 when Hallowicked's original partner, UltraMantis Black, was unable to compete due to injury. A random draw to determine Hallowicked's partner took place and Delirious was the first chosen wrestler to be present, after The Rockin' Rebel and Roderick Strong. After defeating the team of Rorschach and Crossbones, Up in Smoke (Cheech and Cloudy), and Team DDT (KUDO and MIKAMI), the team went on to the semi-finals in the tournament, where they lost to The Kings of Wrestling (Chris Hero and Claudio Castagnoli). The team won the Chikara Campeonatos de Parejas on October 26 at Bruised. Delirious and Hallowicked have also taken to teaming with Cheech and Cloudy (aliases: Deliriouscito and Hallowickedcito) in 3 and 4-man tag team matches. The duo set a record for the most number of successful title defenses of the Campeonatos De Parejas, including a rematch against the former champions, F.I.S.T. On September 21, 2008, Incoherence lost the titles to the Super Smash Bros. (Player Uno and Player Dos) in Cleveland, Ohio at Laying in the Gutter, Looking at the Stars.

In March 2009, Incoherence was expanded to a three man stable with the addition of Frightmare. Incoherence continued to team together until April 2009.

==== The Order of the Neo-Solar Temple (2009–2010) ====
In May 2009, Delirious was revealed as the new third member of the rudo (heel) stable The Order of the Neo-Solar Temple, joining UltraMantis Black and Crossbones, after having been abducted by them a month earlier. He was under the influence of UltraMantis' Eye of Tyr, a mysterious jewel that had the ability to control the mind of anyone, so long as it was touched on their foreheads. He came out wearing the colors of the Order and did not run around and scream at the opening bell. He defeated Arik Cannon that night, using UltraMantis Black's Praying Mantis Bomb finisher. The next night, he and the Order defeated the Super Smash Bros. and Create-A-Wrestler, Delirious again using the Praying Mantis Bomb to pick up the win. On November 22, 2009, at Season 8 finale Three-Fisted Tales Delirious and UltraMantis Black defeated Delirious' former team mates Hallowicked and Frightmare to earn their third point, which means that they can now challenge for the Campeonatos de Parejas. However, that same night UltraMantis lost possession of the Eye of Tyr to Tim Donst and the rudo stable Bruderschaft des Kreuzes, led by Ares and Claudio Castagnoli. Delirious and UltraMantis Black used their three points to get a match for the Campeonatos de Parejas on February 28, 2010, at A World of Comforting Illusions, but were defeated by the defending champions The Colony (Fire Ant and Soldier Ant), after Ares came out and used the Eye of Tyr to release Delirious from under the influence of UltraMantis, at which point he went crazy and ran out of the arena.

==== Bruderschaft des Kreuzes (2010–2014) ====
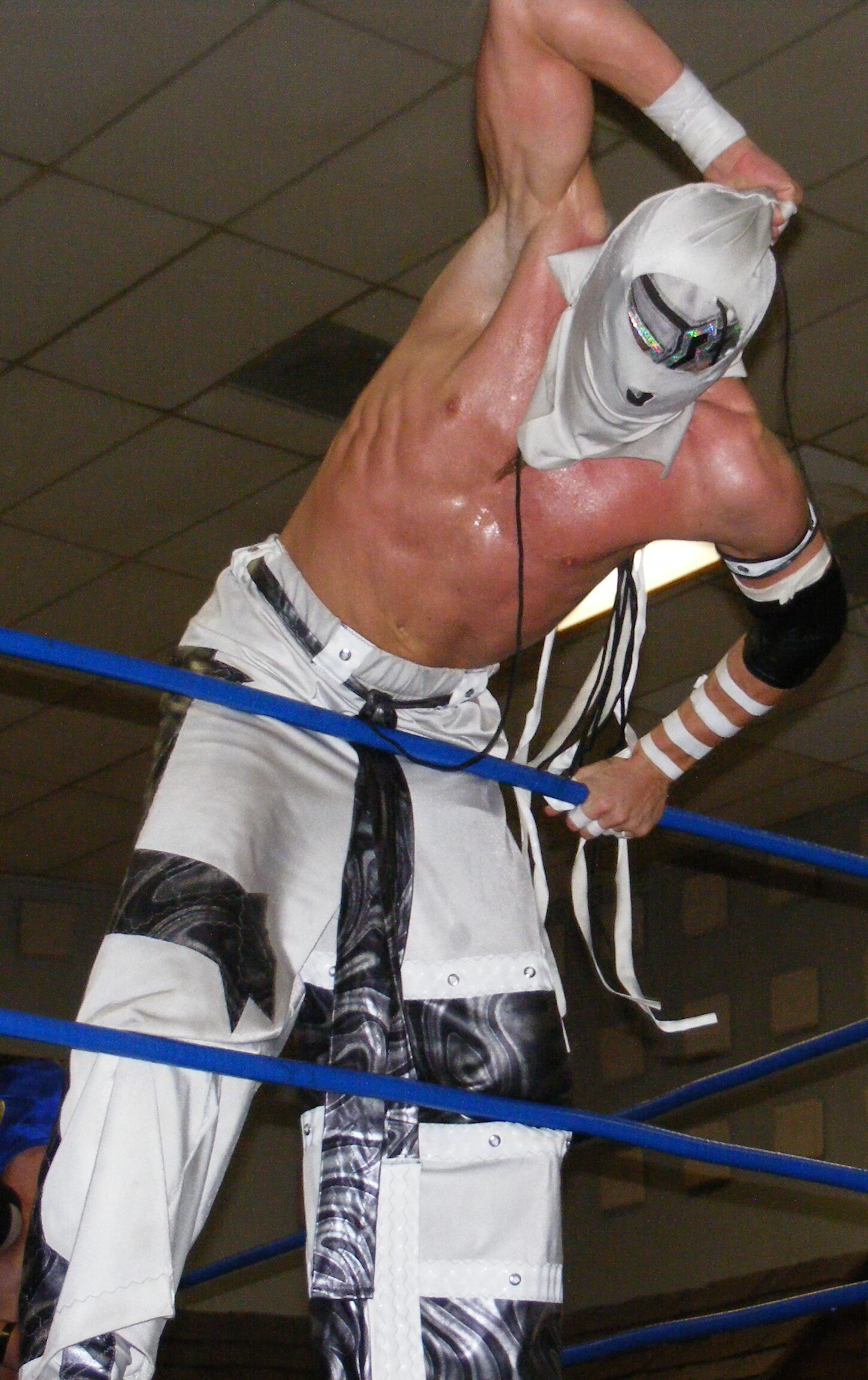
Delirious in his BDK attire in August 2010

Delirious returned to Chikara in May 2010 at Aniversario Zehn, revealing himself as the newest member of Bruderschaft des Kreuzes and helping Ares defeat UltraMantis Black in a singles match. The following day at Aniversario Elf Delirious was instrumental in helping Castagnoli and Ares retain the Campeonatos de Parejas against his former Incoherence team mates Hallowicked and Frightmare. At the following show, We Must Eat Michigan's Brain, on June 26, Delirious was defeated by UltraMantis Black in a singles match. On October 23 Delirious represented BDK in the torneo cibernetico match, where they faced a team composed of Chikara originals. He was eliminated from the match by UltraMantis Black. In April 2011, Delirious represented BDK in the 2011 King of Trios, alongside Tim Donst and Jakob Hammermeier. After defeating Da Soul Touchaz in the first round, the team was eliminated from the tournament in the quarterfinals by The Colony (Fire Ant, Green Ant and Soldier Ant). During the tournament the BDK representatives were confronted by Delirious' former partners Hallowicked, Frightmare and UltraMantis Black, the last of whom had announced his intention of righting his past wrongs, namely his manipulation of Delirious. Delirious, seemingly remembering his past, ran out of the arena, while the rest of BDK began brawling with the trio also known as the Spectral Envoy. UltraMantis Black eventually recovered the Eye of Tyr on November 13, 2011, at High Noon and in January 2012 used it to release Delirious from BDK. However, on February 25, 2012, Delirious attacked UltraMantis in the middle of Spectral Envoy's match against F.I.S.T. for the Campeonatos de Parejas, resulting in F.I.S.T. retaining their title. The next night, Delirious, now able to speak in a coherent, intelligible manner due to smashing the Eye of Tyr, cut a promo stating that he remembered everything he had suffered while under the control of the Eye of Tyr and its holders, and he vowed to make UltraMantis suffer until 2014 as revenge for the two years that he had lost since UltraMantis first used the Eye of Tyr on him. On June 2 at Chikarasaurus Rex: How to Hatch a Dinosaur, Delirious formed a new alliance with Kobald, Kodama and Obariyon of The Batiri. At the following pay-per-view, Under the Hood on December 2, Delirious, Kobald, Kodama, Obariyon and Ophidian were defeated in a ten-man tag team match by UltraMantis Black, Frightmare, Hallowicked, Blind Rage and Crossbones, with Delirious being pinned by UltraMantis for the win.

After Chikara's one-year hiatus, Delirious returned to the promotion, re-joining BDK on October 26, 2014. On December 6 at Tomorrow Never Dies, Delirious was defeated by UltraMantis Black and was, as a result, forced to leave the promotion. After the match, Delirious used the Eye of Tyr to turn Hallowicked and Frightmare against UltraMantis.

=== Pro Wrestling Noah (2009–2011) ===
In late 2009 Delirious began working for Japanese wrestling promotion Pro Wrestling Noah, making his debut on October 15 in a tag team match, where he and Keith Walker defeated Makoto Hashi and Yoshinari Ogawa. The following day he entered the round robin stage of the 2009 Junior Heavyweight League, losing to Katsuhiko Nakajima in his first match in the tournament. On October 18 Delirious scored a major upset victory in his second match in the tournament, by defeating former three-time GHC Junior Heavyweight Champion Kenta and followed that up with another victory over Ricky Marvin on October 22. Despite losing his fourth match in the tournament to Kotaro Suzuki, Delirious made it to the semifinals of the tournament, where he was defeated by Jushin Thunder Liger on October 31. Delirious returned to Noah in April 2010 and on April 25 he received a shot at the GHC Junior Heavyweight Championship, but was defeated by the defending champion Yoshinobu Kanemaru. In July 2011, Delirious and fellow ROH performer, Eddie Edwards, took part in Noah's 2011 Nippon TV Cup Jr. Heavyweight Tag League. After two wins and two losses, Delirious and Edwards finished third in their block, missing the finals of the tournament.

=== Return to Impact Wrestling / TNA (2022–2023) ===
On September 23, 2022, Delirious made his return at Victory Road, where he was defeated by Mike Bailey for the Impact X Division Championship. on the September 29, 2022 episode of the Impact Wrestling, Delirious lost to Black Taurus. on the November 24, 2022 episode of Impact Wrestling Before The Impact, Delirious and Yuya Uemura lost to Raj Singh (wrestler), and Mahabali Shera. on the December 15 episode of the Impact Wrestling, Delirious lost to Eddie Edwards. At Hard To Kill, Delirious competed in a Six-way match which was won by Kushida. On the January 19 episode of Impact Wrestling Before The Impact, Delirious and Yuya Uemura lost to Violent by Design (Kon and Angels).

=== Major League Wrestling (2022) ===
On October 30, 2022, Delirious made his Major League Wrestling Debut at Fightland, teaming with Mini Abismo Negro he was defeated by Microman and Lince Dorado.

== Personal life ==
On November 14, 2023, Johnston married former ROH Women of Honor competitor Mandy Leon. On July 18, 2024 it was announced that Delirious & his wife Mandy Leon are expecting a baby. Their daughter was born in August 31, 2024.

== Championships and accomplishments ==
- Action Packed Wrestling
  - APW Championship (1 time)
- Central States Wrestling
  - CSW Cruiserweight Championship (1 time)
- Chikara
  - Campeonatos de Parejas (1 time) – with Hallowicked
- Independent Wrestling Association Mid-South
  - IWA Mid-South Light Heavyweight Championship (2 times)
  - ICW/ICWA Tex-Arkana Television Championship (5 times^{1})
- International Wrestling Cartel
  - IWC Super Indy Championship (2 times)
  - IWC Super Indy Tournament (2006)
- NWA Midwest
  - NWA Midwest X Division Championship (1 time)
- NWA Wildside
  - Super Indy Tournament (2004)
- Pro Wrestling Illustrated
  - Ranked No. 88 of the 500 top wrestlers in the PWI 500 in 2007
- Pro Wrestling Noah
  - NTV G+ Cup Jr. Heavyweight Tag League Fighting Spirit Award (2011) – with Eddie Edwards
- Ring of Honor
  - ROH Survival of the Fittest (2006)

^{1}This was a "gimmick" title that was defended under the "24/7 rule" by Larry Sweeney in a number of independent and regional promotions. Both Delirious and Colt Cabana held the title multiple times during a 3-Way Dance against Sweeney at an IWA Mid-South show on December 30, 2005.
