= Special referee =

In law, a special referee acts as a judge on matters of fact only.

In many instances, the interpretation of the specific statutes or case law relevant to a dispute is absolutely clear. The uncertainty between the parties lies in the facts. Hence, a special referee is an expert in the factual topic, whether it be shipping, civil engineering, accounting, etc. The special referee hears evidence and makes factual findings which bind the parties. This will usually be sufficient for the parties to resolve the dispute since the law can now be applied.

If the parties still cannot agree, they may initiate proceedings for arbitration or litigation but, on an inter partes basis, the facts are conclusively determined by the judgment of the special referee and only questions of law may be argued before the new forum. Thus, the use of a special referee provides a relatively swift and cost-effective mechanism for dispute resolution if only because the procedure is less formal than in a court and the referee's existing expertise reduces the need to continually explain complex technical and factual matters to a judge who has only legal expertise.

== Scope ==
The parties may anticipate the possibility of a dispute and nominate a special referee as the most appropriate form of dispute resolution (see forum selection clause). Such clauses cannot limit or deny the right of either party to refer the matter to a court (whether in the state nominated or, if the contract does not specify a state, in any court prepared to accept jurisdiction subject to the rules on forum shopping).

If there is no anticipatory provision in the contract, the parties may, of their own initiative, seek out a person qualified to act as a special referee and submit the factual case to him or her for resolution. Although costs will be involved in legal representation, fees to witnesses, and in the fee to the special referee, the expenditure will be a fraction of the costs of full-scale litigation.

If there is no agreement between the parties, the civil procedure of many states allows the court to refer the matter to a special referee when this will both provide expertise on the facts, and enable the legal case to be disposed of in a more timely fashion. For example, in Canada, the Arbitration Act provides:

14. (1) Subject to rules of court and to any right to have particular cases tried by a jury, the court or a judge may refer any question arising in any cause or matter, other than a criminal proceeding by the Crown, to an official or special referee for inquiry or report.
(2) The report of an official or special referee may be adopted wholly or partially by the court or a judge, and if so adopted may be enforced as a judgment or order to the same effect.

In the New York State Unified Court System, a special referee may be appointed, but not in matrimonial cases nor if both parties object, nor if the proposed referee has certain conflicts of interest.

As with most legal terminology, there is some variation by jurisdictions in the precise nomenclature used: in some jurisdictions a special referee is known as a "master", "special master", "monitor", or "auditor".

== See also ==
- Arbitration
- Fiduciary
- Law clerk
- Matter of law
- Mediation
- Settlement conference
