= International Wrestling Cartel =

Professional wrestling promotion

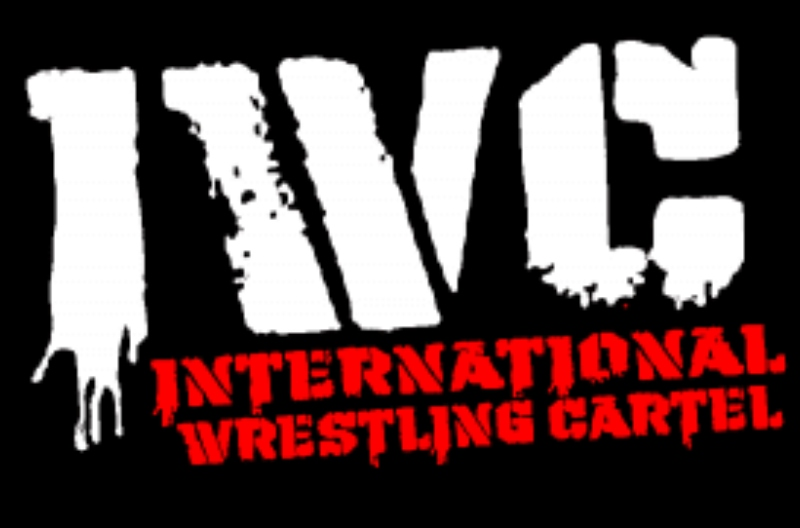
- Logo since August 2015
- Acronym: IWC
- Founded: 2001
- Style: American Wrestling
- Headquarters: West Mifflin, Pennsylvania
- Founder(s): Bubba the Bulldog; Norm Connors
- Owner(s): Bubba the Bulldog (2001); Norm Connors (2001–2009); Chuck Roberts (2009–2014); Justin Plummer (2014–present)
- Website: iwcwrestling.com

International Wrestling Cartel is an American professional wrestling promotion based in Pittsburgh, Pennsylvania. It is owned and operated by Justin Plummer, who has become the longest tenured owner.

Norm Connors ran the promotion for 9 years until he handed the reins to then announcer Chuck Roberts. Roberts owned the International Wrestling Cartel till 2015 before being sold to Justin Plummer. IWC holds live events and pay-per-views now exclusively on their streaming network, the IWC Network. Annual PPV events include Winner Takes All, Caged Fury, Reloaded, Night of the Superstars, and the long lasting Super Indy Tournament. IWC aired 56 episodes of a weekly television show called IWC Ignition.

In 2019, the promotion unveiled the IWC Network, which allowed streaming of live events and a back-catalog of past events as far back as 2002. Produced by 2:1 Media, events began streaming live for IWC Network subscribers or available as one-time purchases. The IWC is best known for their annual Super Indy Tournament. This tournament has featured many participants and winners who have gone on to become major television stars, and is often considered to be a launching pad into professional wrestling success. The local wrestlers would refer to popular, well known wrestlers as "Super Indy" and the tournament was born.

IWC's Iron City Wrestling Academy is responsible for the training of Britt Baker, Wardlow, and Logan Shulo (Elias).

== Championships ==
=== Current championships ===
Championship	Current champion(s)	Reign	Date won	Days held	Location	Event	Previous champion(s)
IWC World Heavyweight Championship	Bill Collier	2	December 3, 2022	1,396+	Elizabeth, Pennsylvania	IWC 5th Annual Pittsburgh Classic	Elijah Dean
IWC Women's Championship	Katie Arquette	4	December 2, 2023	1,032+	Elizabeth, Pennsylvania	IWC 6th Annual Pittsburgh Classic	Holidead
IWC Tag Team Championship	Tommy Dreamer & Channing Decker	1	April 27, 2024	885+	Belle Vernon, Pennsylvania	SuperStar Showdown V	The Frontline (Tito Oric & Mambo Italiano)
IWC Super Indy Championship	Sam Holloway	1	October 5, 2024	724+	Elizabeth, Pennsylvania	Super Indy 23	Ganon Jones Jr
IWC High Stakes Championship	Sam Handeman	1	December 2, 2023	1,032+	Elizabeth, Pennsylvania	IWC 6th Annual Pittsburgh Classic	Spencer Slade

=== Super Indy Tournament ===
Tournament	Winner	Date won	Location	Event
Super Indy Tournament	Duke Davis	October 7, 2023	Elizabeth, Pennsylvania	Super Indy 22
Super Indy Tournament	Cole Karter	October 8, 2022	Elizabeth, Pennsylvania	Super Indy 21
Super Indy Tournament	Cole Karter	October 16, 2021	Elizabeth, Pennsylvania	Super Indy 20
Super Indy Tournament	Brian Pillman Jr.	September 12, 2020	Washington, Pennsylvania	Super Indy 19
Super Indy Tournament	Wardlow	June 15, 2019	Elizabeth, Pennsylvania	Super Indy 18
Super Indy Tournament	Jonathan Gresham	June 9, 2018	Elizabeth, Pennsylvania	Super Indy 17
Super Indy Tournament	Adam Cole	June 10, 2017	Elizabeth, Pennsylvania	Super Indy 16
Super Indy Tournament	Josh Alexander	June 11, 2016	Elizabeth, Pennsylvania	Super Indy 15
Super Indy Tournament	Dylan Bostic	June 13, 2015	Elizabeth, Pennsylvania	Super Indy 14
Super Indy Tournament	R.J. City	June 14, 2014	Elizabeth, Pennsylvania	Super Indy 13
Super Indy Tournament	Facade	June 15, 2013	Elizabeth, Pennsylvania	Super Indy 12
Super Indy Tournament	Sami Callihan	June 23, 2012	Elizabeth, Pennsylvania	Super Indy 11
Super Indy Tournament	Egotistico Fantastico	June 18, 2011	Elizabeth, Pennsylvania	Super Indy 10
Super Indy Tournament	Shima Xion	May 8, 2010	Elizabeth, Pennsylvania	Super Indy 9
Super Indy Tournament	Super Hentai	May 15 & 16, 2009	Elizabeth, Pennsylvania	Super Indy 8
Super Indy Tournament	Jerry Lynn	May 11, 2008	Elizabeth, Pennsylvania	Super Indy 7
Super Indy Tournament	Larry Sweeney	May 11, 2007	McKeesport, Pennsylvania	Super Indy 6
Super Indy Tournament	Delirious	April 15, 2006	Elizabeth, Pennsylvania	Super Indy 5
Super Indy Tournament	John McChesney	April 29, 2005	McKeesport, Pennsylvania	Super Indy 4
Super Indy Tournament	Chris Sabin	May 8, 2004	West Mifflin, Pennsylvania	Super Indy 3
Super Indy Tournament	Colt Cabana	May 10, 2003	White Oak, Pennsylvania	Super Indy 2
Super Indy Tournament	Super Hentai	May 22, 2002	Monroeville, Pennsylvania	Super Indy
