= Elizabeth, Pennsylvania =

Borough in Pennsylvania, US

- Borough
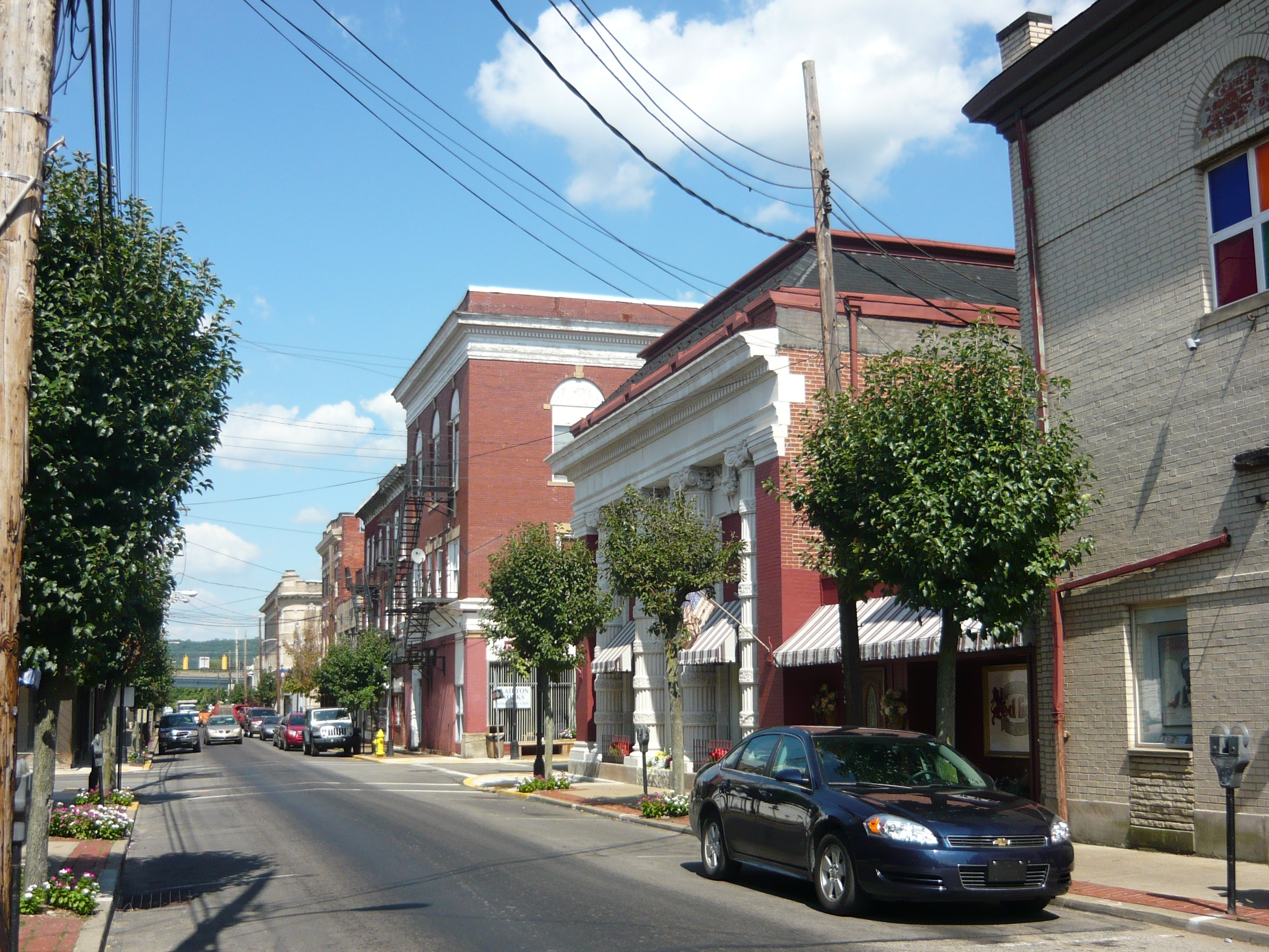
- Second Avenue

- Location in Allegheny County and the U.S. state of Pennsylvania.
- Coordinates: 40°16′16″N 79°53′11″W
- Country: United States
- State: Pennsylvania
- County: Allegheny

Area
  - Total: 0.41 sq mi (1.07 km^{2})
  - Land: 0.34 sq mi (0.89 km^{2})
  - Water: 0.073 sq mi (0.19 km^{2})

Population (2020)
  - Total: 1,398
  - Density: 4,077.3/sq mi (1,574.26/km^{2})
- Time zone: UTC-5 (Eastern (EST))
  - Summer (DST): UTC-4 (EDT)
- ZIP codes: 15037
- Area code: 412
- FIPS code: 42-22992
- Website: elizabethpa.net

Pennsylvania Historical Marker
- Designated: December 20, 1946

Elizabeth is a borough in Allegheny County, Pennsylvania, United States, on the east bank of the Monongahela River, where Pennsylvania Route 51 crosses. The town is 15 miles (24 km) upstream (south) of Pittsburgh and close to the county line and has population was 1,398 at the 2020 census. The borough of Elizabeth is entirely contained within the 15037 USPS ZIP code. The local school district is the Elizabeth Forward School District. The borough is home to neighborhoods Walker Heights and Town Hill.

== Geography ==
Elizabeth is located at 40°16′16″N 79°53′11″W (40.271189, -79.886347).

According to the United States Census Bureau, the borough has a total area of 0.4 square miles (1.0 km^{2}), of which 0.3 square miles (0.78 km^{2}) is land and 0.1 square miles (0.26 km^{2}), or 14.63%, is water.

== Surrounding neighborhoods ==
Elizabeth has two land borders with the townships of Elizabeth, to the east and northeast, and of Forward to the south and the southeast. Across the Monongahela River, Elizabeth runs adjacent with West Elizabeth and Jefferson Hills, the former with a direct connector via Malady Bridge.

== Demographics ==
Historical population
| Census | Pop. | Note | %± |
|---|---|---|---|
| 1850 | 1,120 | | — |
| 1860 | 975 | | −12.9% |
| 1870 | 1,196 | | 22.7% |
| 1880 | 1,810 | | 51.3% |
| 1890 | 1,804 | | −0.3% |
| 1900 | 1,866 | | 3.4% |
| 1910 | 2,311 | | 23.8% |
| 1920 | 2,703 | | 17.0% |
| 1930 | 2,939 | | 8.7% |
| 1940 | 2,976 | | 1.3% |
| 1950 | 2,615 | | −12.1% |
| 1960 | 2,597 | | −0.7% |
| 1970 | 2,273 | | −12.5% |
| 1980 | 1,892 | | −16.8% |
| 1990 | 1,610 | | −14.9% |
| 2000 | 1,609 | | −0.1% |
| 2010 | 1,493 | | −7.2% |
| 2020 | 1,398 | | −6.4% |

As of the 2000 census, there were 1,609 people, 681 households, and 422 families residing in the borough. The population density was 4,544.8 inhabitants per square mile (1,754.8/km^{2}). There were 758 housing units at an average density of 2,141.1 units per square mile (826.7 units/km^{2}). The racial makeup of the borough was 94.84% White, 3.60% African American, 0.37% Native American, 0.19% Asian, and 0.99% from two or more races. Hispanic or Latino of any race were 0.25% of the population.

Households: There were 681 households, out of which 26.9% had children under the age of 18 living with them, 44.6% were married couples living together, 11.9% had a female householder with no husband present, and 37.9% were non-families. 33.0% of all households were made up of individuals, and 17.8% had someone living alone who was 65 years or older. The average household size was 2.34 and the average family size was 2.98.

Age distribution: The population was spread out, with 22.9% under the age of 18, 6.5% from 18 to 24, 28.5% from 25 to 44, 21.0% from 45 to 64, and 21.1% who were 65 or older. The median age was 40. For every 100 females, there were 82.2 males; for every 100 females age 18 and over, there were 79.1 males.

Income: The median income for a household in the borough was $30,556, and the median income for a family was $36,607. Males had a median income of $28,088 versus $22,350 for females. The per capita income for the borough was $17,618. About 7.3% of families and 10.2% of the population were below the poverty line, including 17.5% of those under age 18 and 8.8% of those age 65 or over.

== Government and politics ==
Presidential elections results
| Year | Republican | Democratic | Third parties |
|---|---|---|---|
| 2020 | 58% 398 | 39% 273 | 1% 12 |
| 2016 | 61% 384 | 36% 225 | 3% 17 |
| 2012 | 56% 346 | 44% 274 | 1% 9 |

Mayor: Barry Boucher

== History ==
Sketch of Elizabeth and West Elizabeth, circa 1897

Elizabeth Town was founded in 1787 by Samuel Mackay, Colonel Stephen Bayard and his wife Elizabeth Mackay Bayard (for whom the town was named). Elizabeth was one of the first seven townships organized by Allegheny County the following year; the others being Moon, St. Clair, Mifflin, Versailles, Plum, and Pitt. The original Elizabeth Township comprised the entire triangle of land between the Monongahela and Youghiogheny Rivers. In addition to present-day Elizabeth Borough and Elizabeth Township, this also included areas which are now Forward Township, Lincoln Borough, Port Vue Borough, Liberty Borough, the City of Glassport, and the Tenth Ward of the City of McKeesport.

In 1803, the keelboat used for the first stages of the Lewis and Clark Expedition was built in Elizabeth. (This claim is disputed by the city of Pittsburgh, which makes a similar claim. See references below.) On April 2, 1834, a charter was issued to incorporate the Town of Elizabeth as a borough.

In 1869, Forward Township and Lincoln Township were separated from Elizabeth Township.

=== Early industry ===
Among the earliest industries of Elizabeth were glass making, safe making, steamboat building, and ship building. Steamboats were built and repaired at O'Neil & Company from as early as 1895, and the Elizabeth Marine Ways operated between at least 1898 to 1925. The town had two coal inclines in 1876, the O'Neil and Company Coal Incline on pool 1, and the Lobb's Run Incline on pool 2.

=== Nike missile site ===
From 1956 to 1963, Elizabeth was the location of a Nike anti-aircraft missile site (40°15′17″N 79°57′59″W).

=== Churches ===
- Allen Chapel A.M.E. Church
- Bethesda United Presbyterian Church Of Elizabeth
- Elizabeth Baptist Church
- Elizabeth United Methodist Church
- Elizabeth Wesleyan Church
- First Presbyterian Church Of Elizabeth – founded 1851

== Old Graveyard ==
The Oldest Cemetery, known as "The Old Graveyard", is located on Bayard Street in Elizabeth. The cemetery contains the remains of Elizabeth Mackay Bayard, for whom the town is named. The cemetery has its first burial dating to 1774.
